= Metro Iloilo–Guimaras =

Metropolitan area in the Philippines

Metro Iloilo–Guimaras Kaulohan nga Iloilo–Guimaras Kalakhang Iloilo–Guimaras
- Metropolitan area
- Metropolitan Iloilo–Guimaras
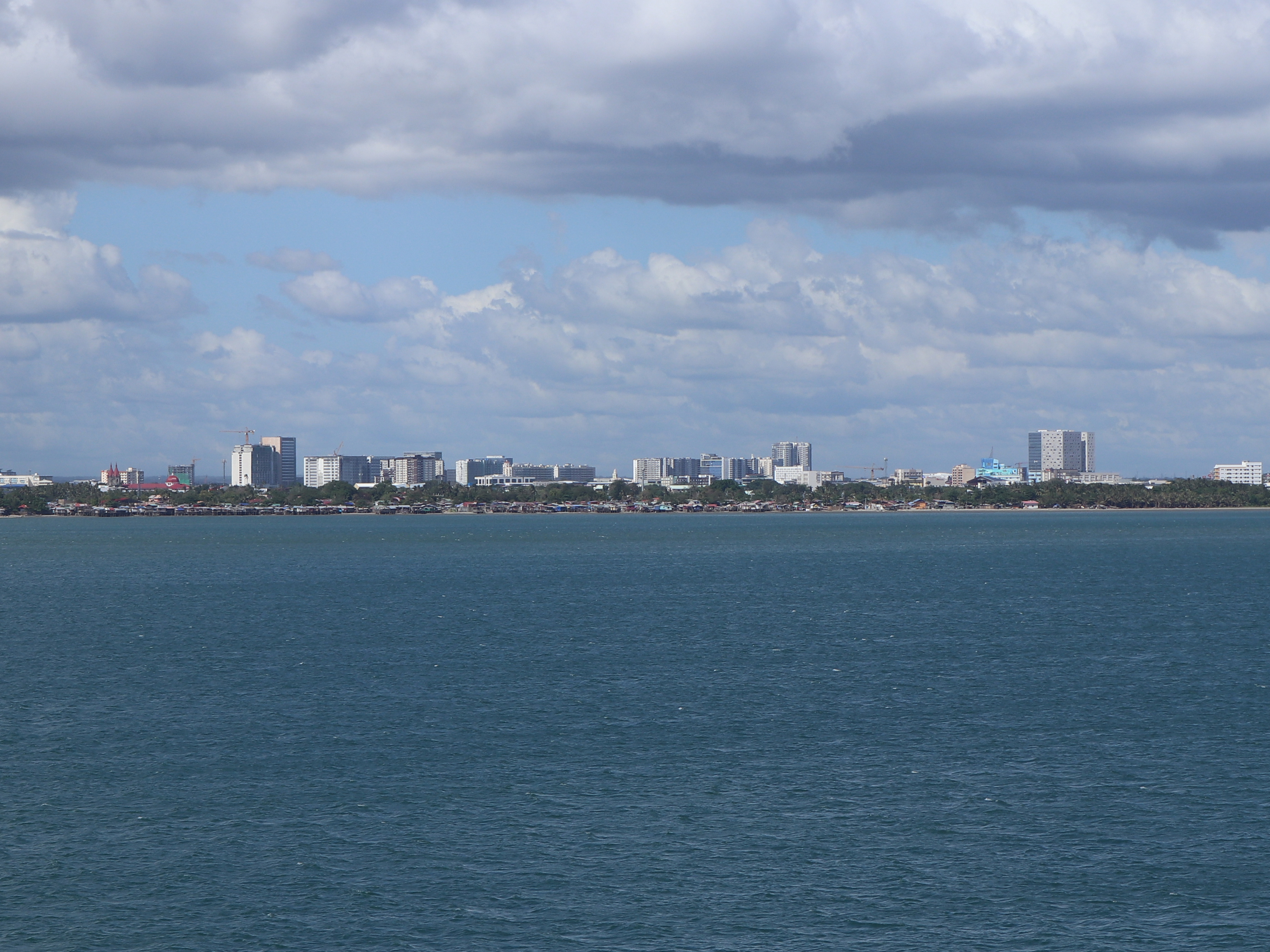
- Skyline of Metro Iloilo in 2024

- Seal
- Nickname: MIG
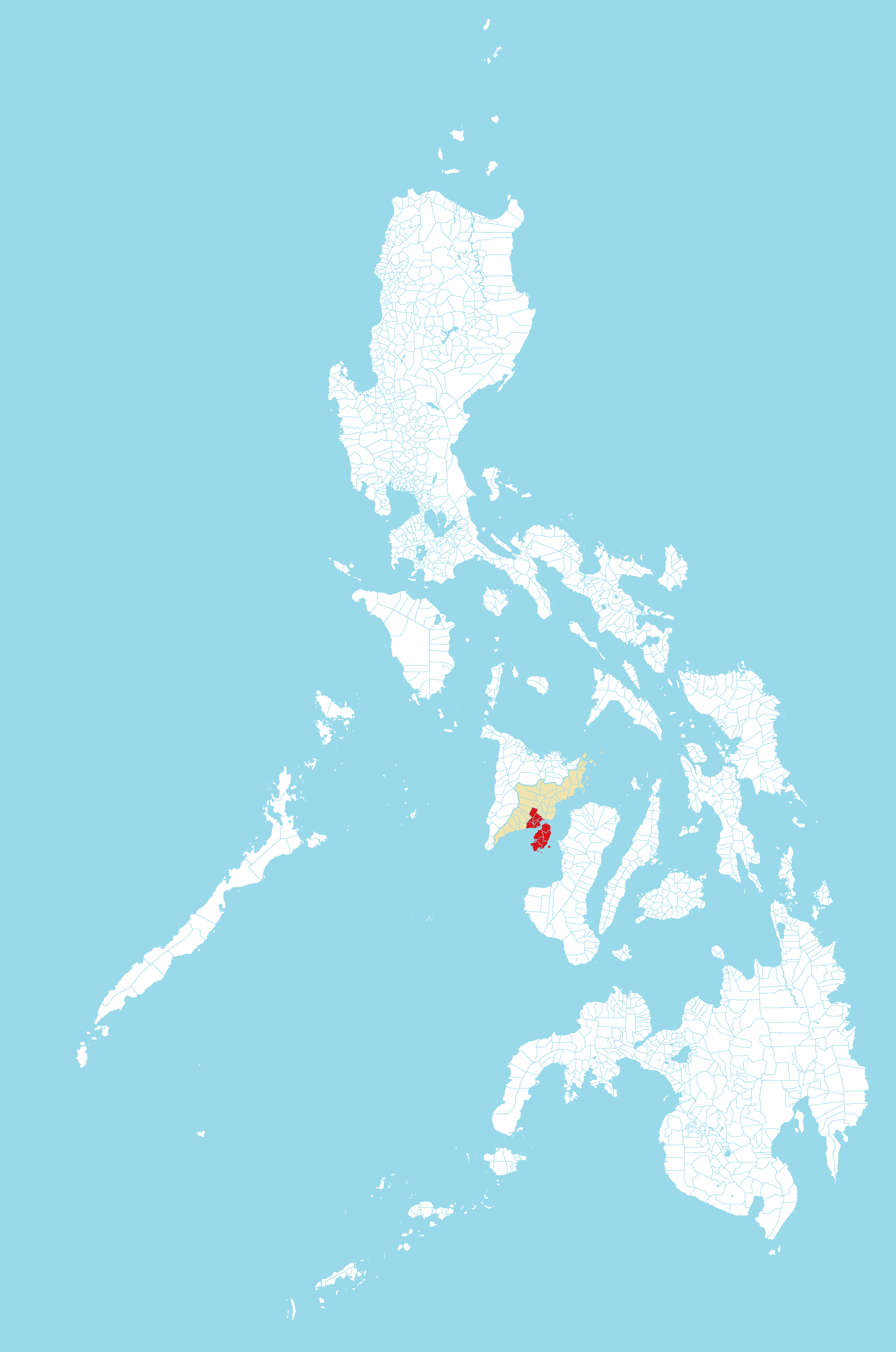
- Map of Metro Iloilo–Guimaras (in red) including the province of Iloilo highlighted in light orange.
- Interactive map of Metro Iloilo–Guimaras
- Coordinates: 10°42′N 122°34′E
- Country: Philippines
- Region: Western Visayas (Region VI)
- Province: Iloilo; Guimaras
- Managing entity: Metro Iloilo–Guimaras Economic Development Council
- Established: February 9, 2001 (as Metro Iloilo); May 22, 2005 (Iloilo City–Guimaras Alliance); August 28, 2006 (as Metro Iloilo–Guimaras)
- Cities and Municipalities: 12: Iloilo City; Cabatuan; Leganes; Oton; Pavia; San Miguel; Santa Barbara; Buenavista; Jordan; Nueva Valencia; San Lorenzo; Sibunag

Government
  - Type: Metropolitan government
  - Body: Metro Iloilo–Guimaras Economic Development Council
  - MIGEDC Chairman: Raisa Treñas (Mayor of Iloilo City)
  - Executive Director: Velma Jane Lao

Area
  - Total: 1,105.53 km^{2} (426.85 sq mi)

Population (2024 census)
  - Total: 1,039,935
  - Density: 940.666/km^{2} (2,436.31/sq mi)
- Time zone: UTC+8 (PST)
- Area code: +63 (0)33
- Languages: Hiligaynon, Kinaray-a, English
- Website: metroiloiloguimaras.org

Metropolitan Iloilo–Guimaras (Hiligaynon: Kaulohan nga Iloílo–Guimarás; Filipino: Kalakhang Iloílo–Guimarás), also shortened as Metro Iloilo–Guimaras or Metro Iloilo, or simply MIG, is a metropolitan area in Western Visayas in the Philippines. It is located on the southeastern coast of Panay, including the nearby island province of Guimaras, and is surrounded by the Iloilo and Guimaras straits.

The metropolitan area comprises the highly urbanized Iloilo City; the regional agro-industrial center of Pavia; the municipalities of Cabatuan, Leganes, Oton, San Miguel, and Santa Barbara; and the island province of Guimaras, which includes its five municipalities: Jordan, Buenavista, Nueva Valencia, San Lorenzo, and Sibunag. It is the second-largest metropolitan area in the Visayas after Metro Cebu and serves as the center of trade and commerce in the region. According to the 2020 census, it has a total population of 1,007,945 people and a land area of 1,105.53 square kilometres (426.85 sq mi).

The Metro Iloilo–Guimaras Economic Development Council (MIGEDC) is the agency responsible for planning and implementing economic growth and development initiatives for Metro Iloilo and the province of Guimaras. It was established through Executive Order No. 559, signed by President Gloria Macapagal-Arroyo on August 28, 2006.

== History ==
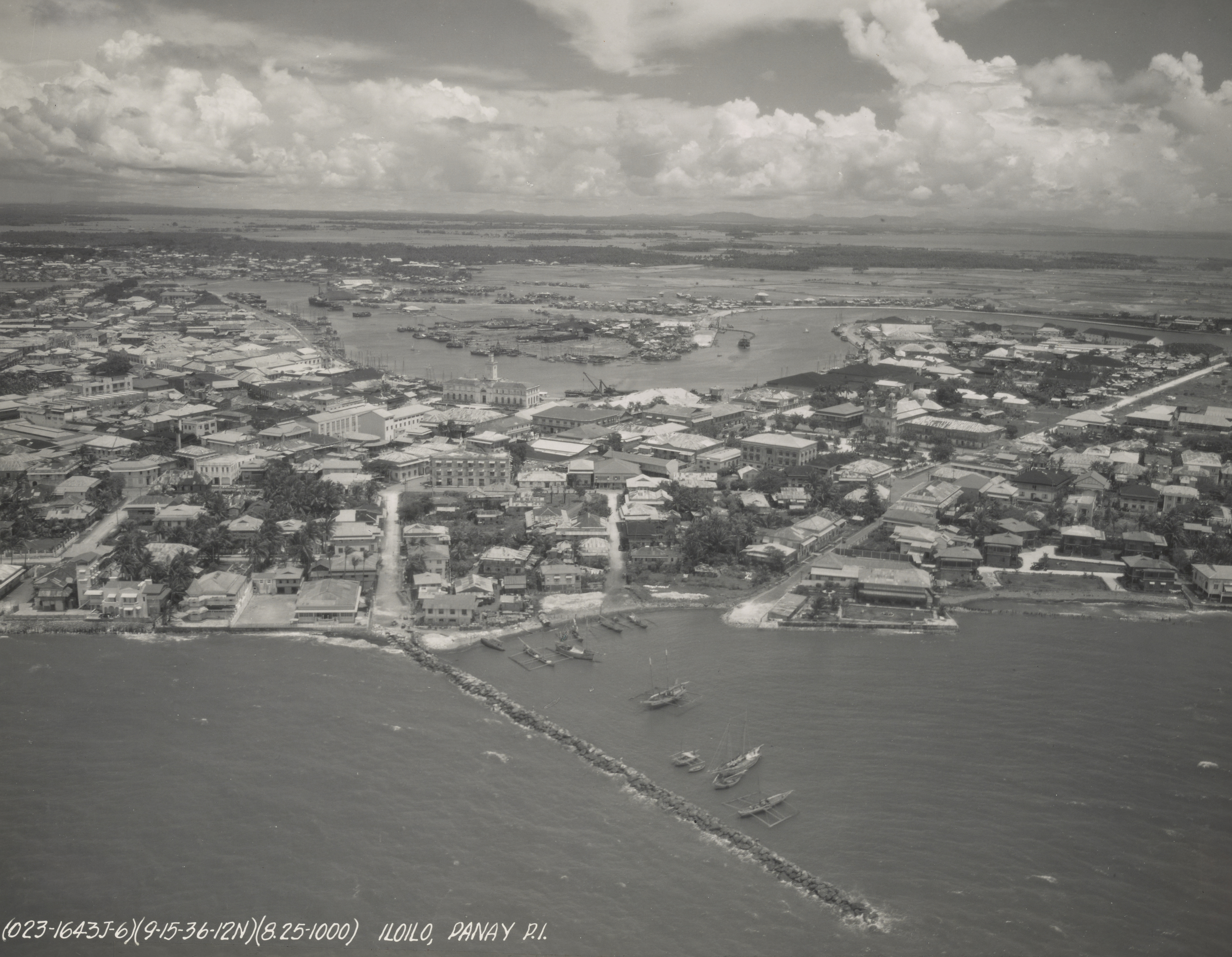
Aerial view of Iloilo City in 1936

Iloilo City was established in the 16th century and is one of the oldest urban centers in the Philippines. Originally a small port town during the early Spanish era, it later rose to become the country’s second most important city, after Manila, during the late Spanish and American colonial periods. As the city’s importance increased, several surrounding municipalities of Arevalo, Jaro, La Paz, Mandurriao, and Molo, were eventually merged into its jurisdiction. The former towns now function as administrative districts, with the City Proper remaining the political and governance center of both the city and the entire province of Iloilo.

By the late 1980s, as urbanization and economic activities in Iloilo City and its neighboring towns expanded, business leaders and local officials began discussions on forming a metropolitan alliance to coordinate regional development efforts. In 1995, the Department of the Interior and Local Government (DILG), in partnership with the Local Government Support Program (LGSP), formally proposed the establishment of a metropolitan alliance involving Iloilo City and the municipalities of Leganes, Oton, Pavia, and San Miguel. The initiative led to the formal creation of the Metropolitan Iloilo Development Council (MIDC) through a Memorandum of Agreement (MOA) on February 9, 2001.

Guimaras, known for its mangoes and scenic island landscapes, was formerly a sub-province of Iloilo before becoming a full-fledged province on May 22, 1992, by virtue of Republic Act No. 7160 and a plebiscite held that same year. Its close geographic and economic ties to Iloilo City led to the formation of the Guimaras–Iloilo City Alliance (GICA) through a MOA on May 22, 2005, focusing on mutually beneficial economic development, particularly in tourism and infrastructure.

The Metro Iloilo–Guimaras Economic Development Council (MIGEDC) was created on August 28, 2006, through Executive Order No. 559 signed by President Gloria Macapagal-Arroyo. Iloilo City serves as the central core, with member areas including the municipalities of Oton, San Miguel, Pavia, Leganes, and the Province of Guimaras. The same executive order also marked the official inclusion of Santa Barbara, which hosts the entrance to the new Iloilo International Airport, into the council. The municipality of Cabatuan, where the airport is located, officially joined the metropolitan alliance in April 2012.

MIGEDC currently serves as the governing body of the Metro Iloilo–Guimaras area. The initiative supports the National Government’s Mega-Region Economic Development Strategy.

== Economy ==
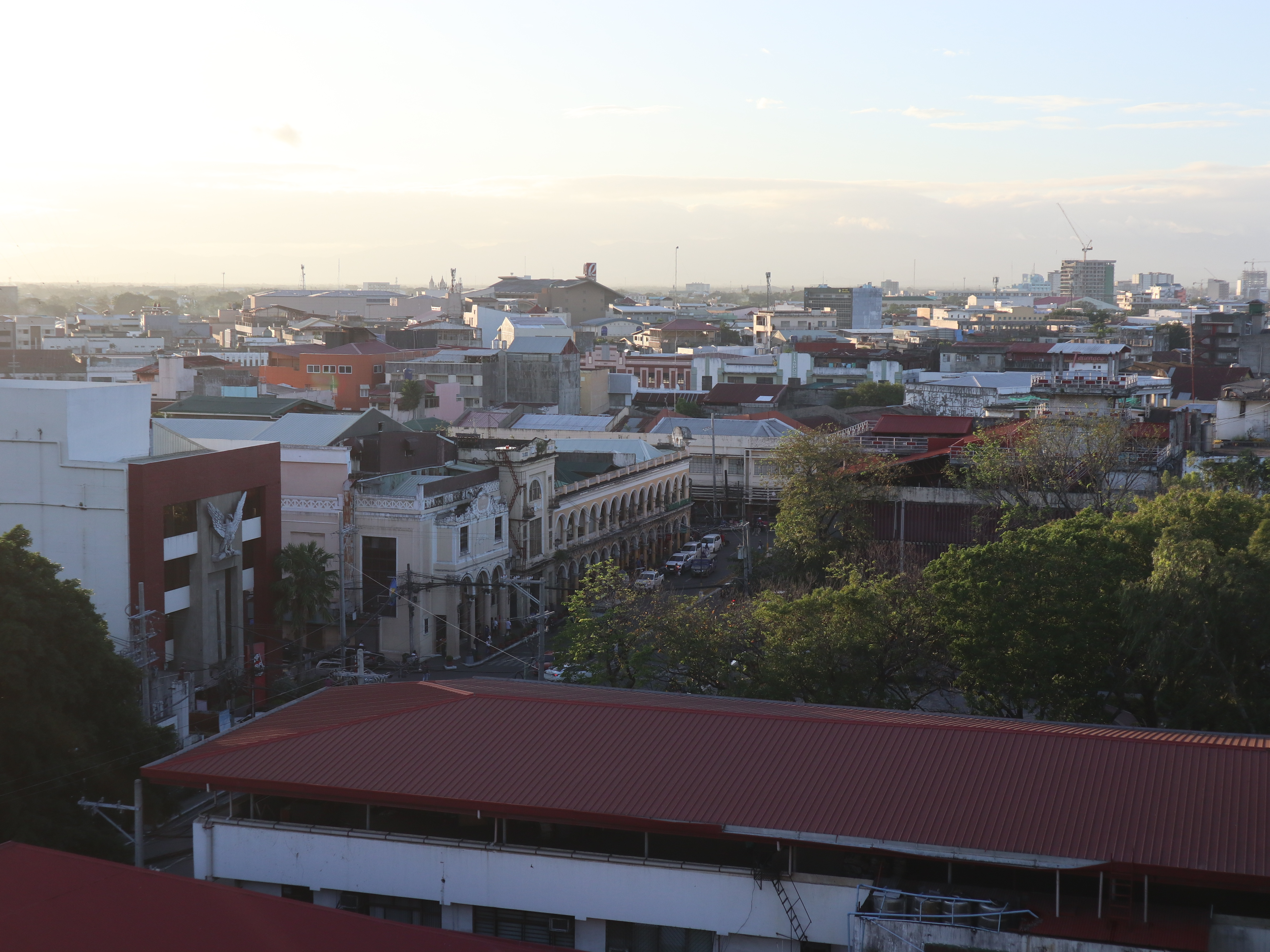
Iloilo Central Business District

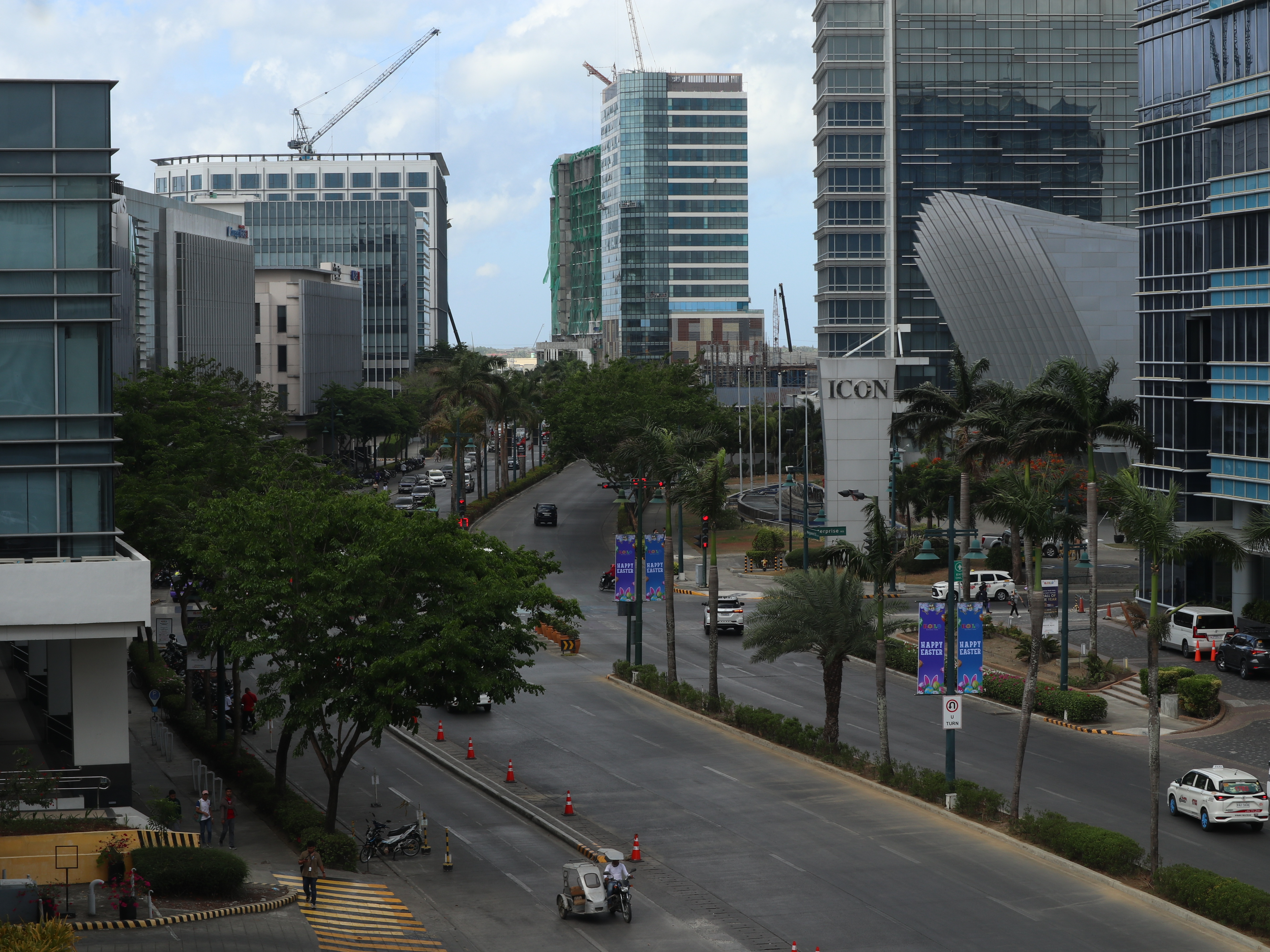
Iloilo Business Park

Metro Iloilo–Guimaras is one of the largest economic centers in the country, with Iloilo City at its core serving as the primary hub for trade, commerce, finance, technology, medical tourism, hospitality, real estate, tourism, education, and manufacturing. Key industries in the metropolitan area include port facility management, telecommunications infrastructure, utilities, agriculture, banking and finance, retail trading, real estate, tourism, and business process outsourcing (BPO).

Beyond the core city of Iloilo, Pavia stands out as the agro-industrial center of the region, with a robust manufacturing sector. It houses 39 manufacturing establishments producing a wide range of products for both domestic and export markets. Notable products include farm implements, milled rice, poultry and livestock feeds, noodles, soft drinks, dressed chicken, cooking oil, furniture, concrete products, polyurethane foam, and industrial and medical gases. Major manufacturing companies in Pavia include Coca-Cola Bottlers, Phils., Vitarich Corporation, Pryce Gases, Inc., Mandaue Foam Industries, Panay Tropical Grains Milling Corp., and Jaspe Light Steel Indus.

Guimaras, a province within the metropolitan area, thrives on its agricultural sector, with major products such as mangoes, palay, coconuts, livestock, poultry, and fish. The province also engages in tourism, fruit processing, coconut processing, fish farming, handicrafts, mining, quarrying, and lime production. Additionally, Metro Iloilo–Guimaras has a growing number of banks, contributing to its ranking as the third-largest area in the Philippines for bank savings deposits and accounts.

== Infrastructure developments ==
=== Roads ===
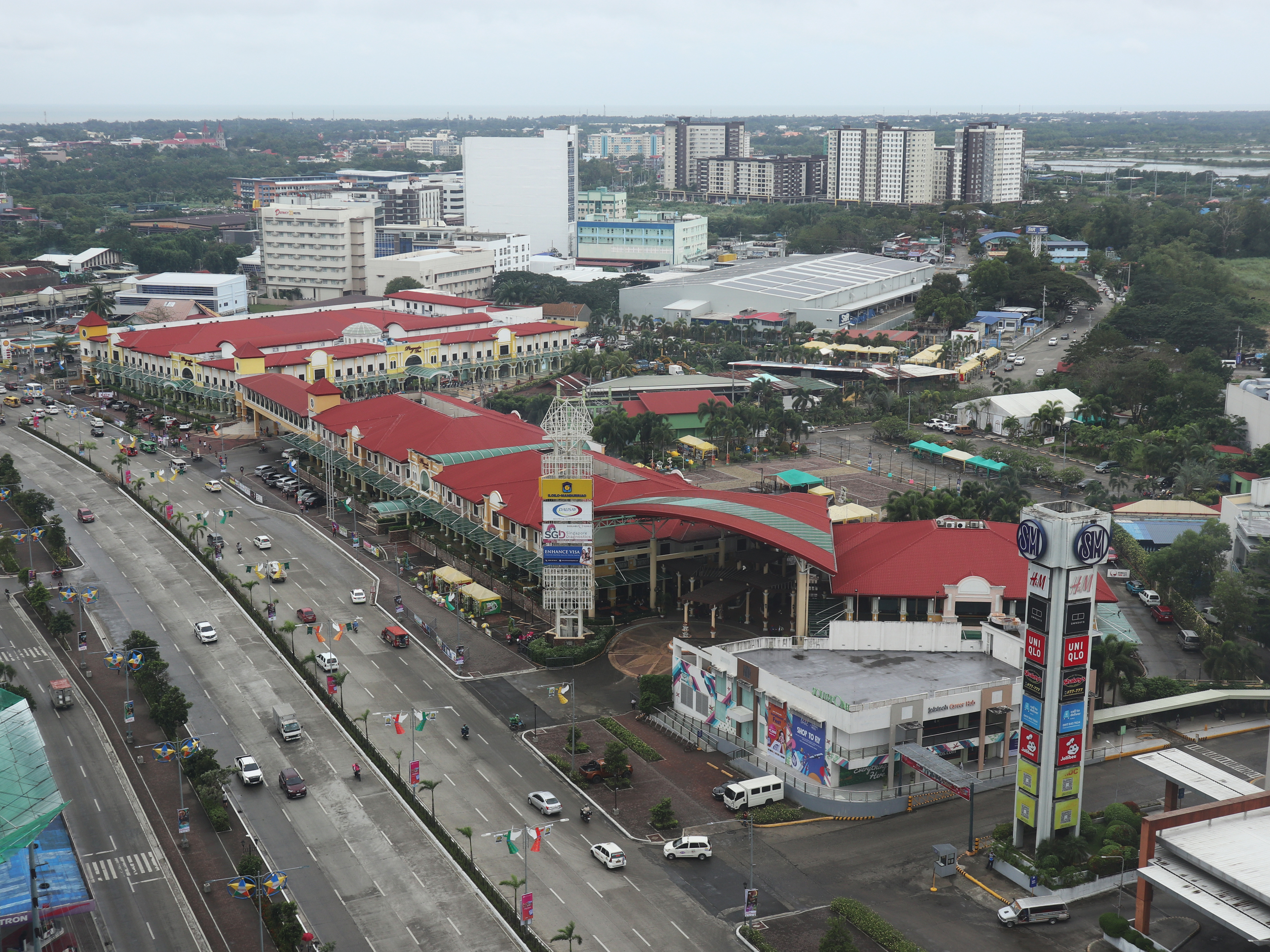
Iloilo Diversion Road, formally known as Sen. Benigno S. Aquino Jr. Avenue, a major highway traversing cities in the metro area

Sen. Benigno S. Aquino Jr. Avenue, commonly referred to as Diversion Road, is the busiest and most significant thoroughfare in Metro Iloilo. It is an 8-lane main road with a protected bike lane and a 2-lane service road, connecting Iloilo City, Pavia, Santa Barbara, and the Iloilo International Airport. Other major roads in the metropolitan area include McArthur Drive, Cong. Narciso Monfort Boulevard, General Luna Street, CJ Ramon Avancena Street, E. Lopez Street, Pres. Corazon C. Aquino Avenue (Circumferential Road 1 or C1), Iznart Street, and Muelle Loney Street.

To address traffic congestion, the area features several vehicular overpasses or flyovers, such as the Infante Flyover and Jalandoni Flyover along General Luna Street in Iloilo City Proper, the Ungka and Aganan Flyovers in Pavia, and the Hibao-an and Buhang Flyovers along the Iloilo Circumferential Road. Aside from the existing Circumferential Road 1 which stretches from Balabago, Jaro, to San Jose, Arevalo, in Iloilo City, three new circumferential roads are also under construction: Circumferential Road 2, connecting Leganes to Pavia and Oton; Circumferential Road 3, linking Zarraga to Santa Barbara; and Circumferential Road 4, extending from Barotac Nuevo to Southern Iloilo.

A major ongoing infrastructure project is the Iloilo–Guimaras Bridge, part of the Panay-Guimaras-Negros Bridge, which will connect Metro Iloilo with the island of Guimaras.

=== Airport ===
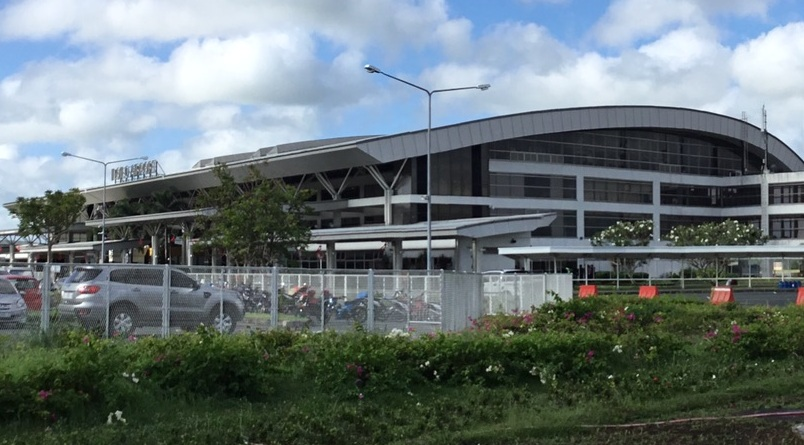
Passenger terminal of Iloilo International Airport in Cabatuan, Iloilo

The Iloilo International Airport serves the general area of Metro Iloilo–Guimaras. Located in the municipality of Cabatuan, specifically in Barangays Tabucan, Gaub, Duyan-Duyan, and Manguna, the airport is accessible via Sen. Benigno S. Aquino Jr. Avenue. The airport complex includes a single runway, administrative and maintenance buildings, waste sorting and water treatment facilities, a power generating station, a cargo terminal, and a main passenger terminal.

Situated along the Tomas Confesor Highway, a major thoroughfare traversing Panay, the airport is easily accessible by road from all parts of Iloilo and the island. Its proximity to the currently defunct Panay Railways network also presents the potential for future rail connectivity, linking the airport to other areas of Panay.

=== Seaport ===
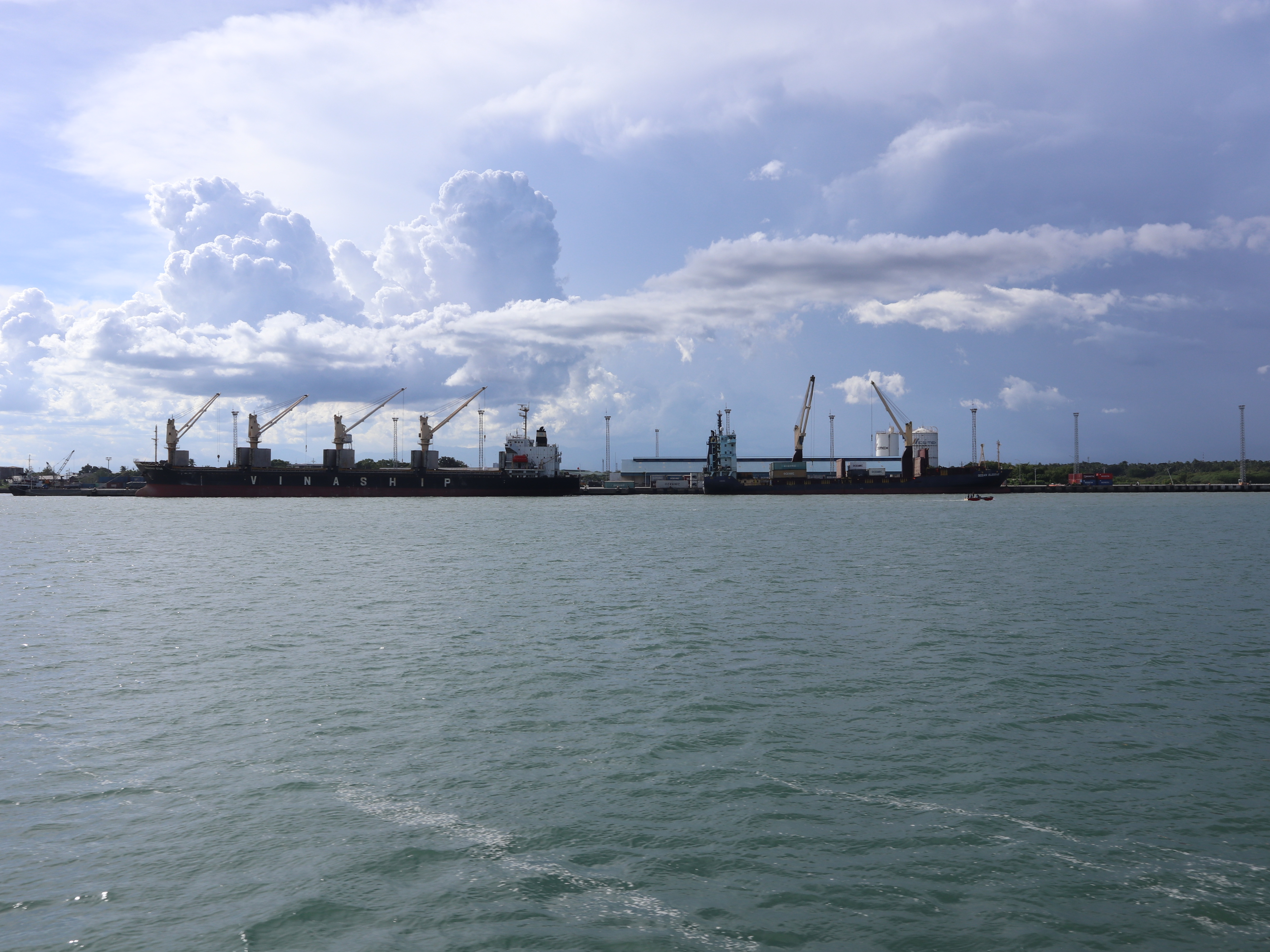
Iloilo International Port, third busiest port in the Philippines by number of ships

The Port of Iloilo serves the general area of Iloilo, the rest of Panay Island, and Guimaras Island. There are five seaports in Metro Iloilo: the Iloilo Ferry Port and Terminal Complex, Iloilo River Port and Terminal Complex, Iloilo Domestic Port and Terminal Complex, Dumangas Ro-Ro Port and Terminal Complex, and the Iloilo Commercial Port Complex. The Iloilo Commercial Port Complex, now known as Visayas Container Terminal, located on 20.8 hectares (51 acres) of reclaimed land, features facilities such as an open operational space, cranes, rails, roll-on/roll-off support, a freight station, and a passenger shed.

Additionally, the Iloilo Fish Port Complex, the only fishing port complex in the Visayas, is located at the mouth of the Batiano River on a reclaimed 20.5-hectare (51-acre) land. The facility supports the region’s fishing industry and serves as a hub for fish trading and distribution.

Several shipping companies operate at the Port of Iloilo, including 2GO Travel, Cokaliong Shipping Lines, and Trans-Asia Shipping Lines. Fast ferries provide eight daily trips on the Iloilo-Bacolod route, while 2GO offer routes connecting Iloilo to other parts of the country.

=== Public-transport terminals ===
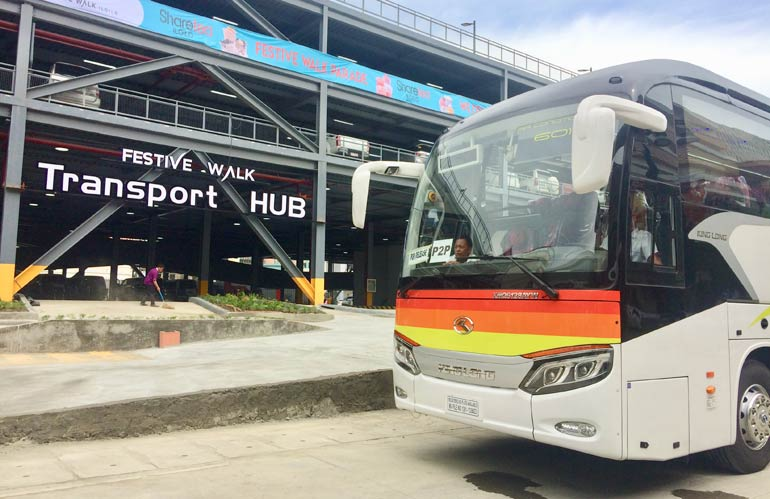
Festive Walk Transport Hub in Iloilo Business Park includes a Premium Point-to-Point (P2P) Bus service, providing transportation from Iloilo City to Iloilo International Airport and various other destinations across Panay

Iloilo City has six integrated transport terminals. These include:

1. Northern Iloilo Integrated Jeepney and Bus Terminal in Tagbac, Jaro
2. Central Line Jeepney and Bus Terminal in Ungka, Jaro
3. Upland Jeepney and Bus Terminal in Hibao-an, Mandurriao
4. Southern Coast Jeepney and Bus Terminal in Mohon, Arévalo
5. North Coastal Jeepney and Bus Terminal in Ingore, La Paz
6. Festive Walk Transport Hub in Iloilo Business Park, Mandurriao

=== Railway ===
There is a proposed revival of the currently defunct Panay Railways, which aims to reconnect Iloilo City to Santa Barbara. Santa Barbara, which has an existing railway station, is also home to the entrance of the Iloilo International Airport in Cabatuan.

== Government ==
The Metro Iloilo–Guimaras Economic Development Council is made up of 12 local government units (LGUs), including Iloilo City, which serves as the metropolitan's central core, and six municipalities in Iloilo Province and five municipalities in Guimaras Province.

=== Component local government units ===
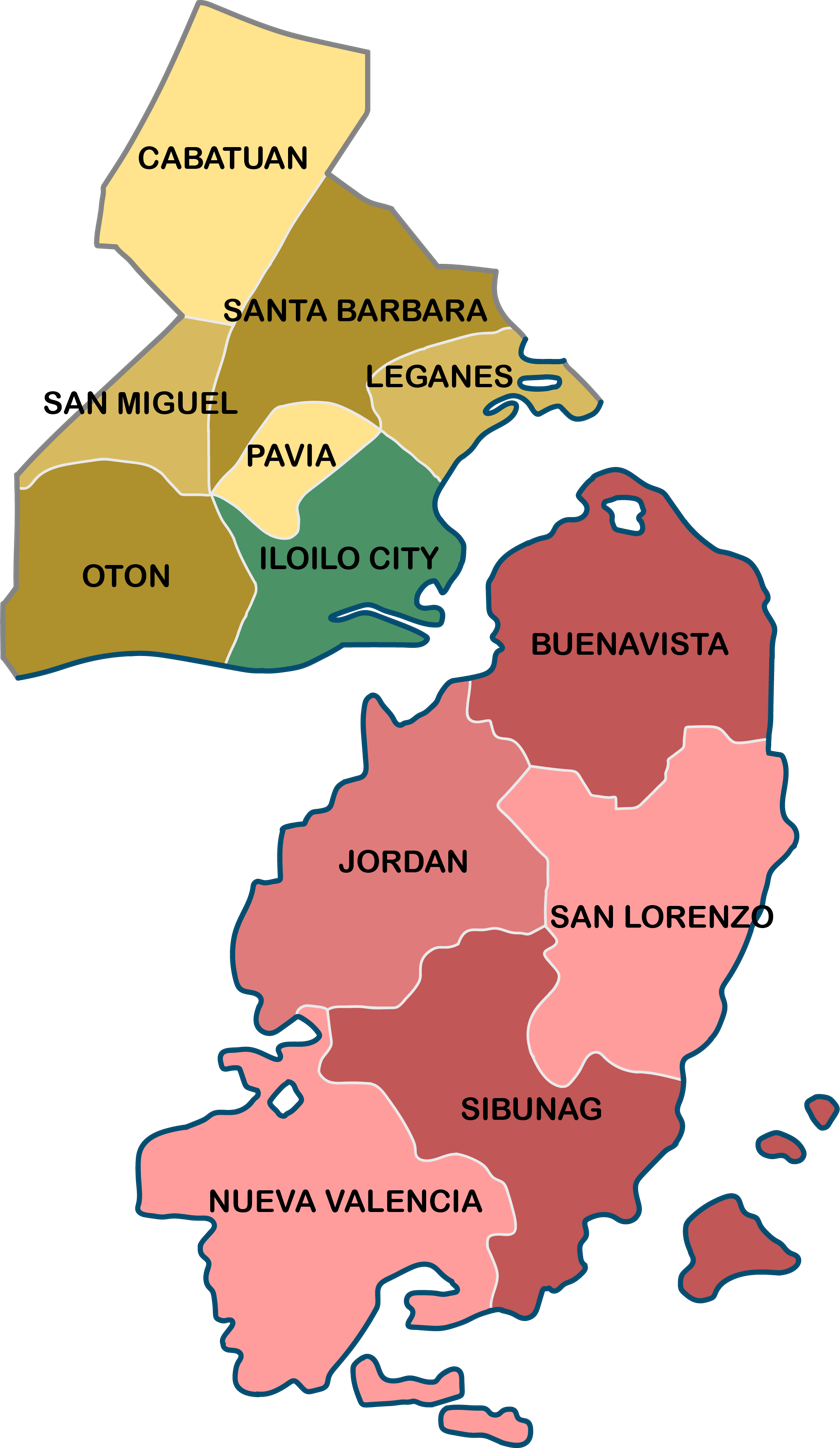
Map of Metro Iloilo–Guimaras, highlighting Iloilo City (green) and municipalities from Iloilo province (yellow) and Guimaras (red)

City or Municipality	Province	Population (2020)	Area		Density	
City or Municipality	Province	Population (2020)	km²	sq mi	/km^{2}	/sq mi
Cabatuan	Iloilo	61,110	112.90	43.59	540	1,400
† Iloilo City	Iloilo (geographically only)	457,626	78.34	30.25	5,800	15,000
Leganes	Iloilo	34,725	32.20	12.43	1,100	2,800
Oton	Iloilo	98,509	86.44	33.37	1,100	3,000
Pavia	Iloilo	70,388	27.15	10.48	2,600	6,700
San Miguel	Iloilo	30,115	31.97	12.34	940	2,400
Santa Barbara	Iloilo	67,630	131.96	50.95	510	1,300
Buenavista	Guimaras	52,899	128.26	49.52	410	1,100
Jordan	Guimaras	39,566	126.11	48.69	310	810
Nueva Valencia	Guimaras	42,771	137.12	52.94	310	810
San Lorenzo	Guimaras	29,444	93.04	35.92	320	820
Sibunag	Guimaras	23,162	120.04	46.35	190	500
Total		1,007,945	1,105.53	426.85	910	2,400

== Education ==
Metro Iloilo–Guimaras is recognized as a prominent educational hub in the Philippines, with a total of nine universities. The following list represents some of the notable institutions in the metro:

- ACSI College Iloilo
- Central Philippine University
- Colegio de San Jose
- Colegio del Sagrado Corazon de Jesus
- Guimaras State University
- Hua Siong College of Iloilo
- Iloilo Doctors' College
- Iloilo Science and Technology University
- John B. Lacson Foundation Maritime University
- St. Paul University Iloilo
- St. Therese – MTC colleges
- University of Iloilo
- University of San Agustin
- University of the Philippines Visayas
- West Visayas State University
- Western Institute of Technology

Two new universities are also expected to expand in the area, the University of St. La Salle in Pavia and National University in Mandurriao, Iloilo City.

== Metro Iloilo–Guimaras Economic Development Council ==
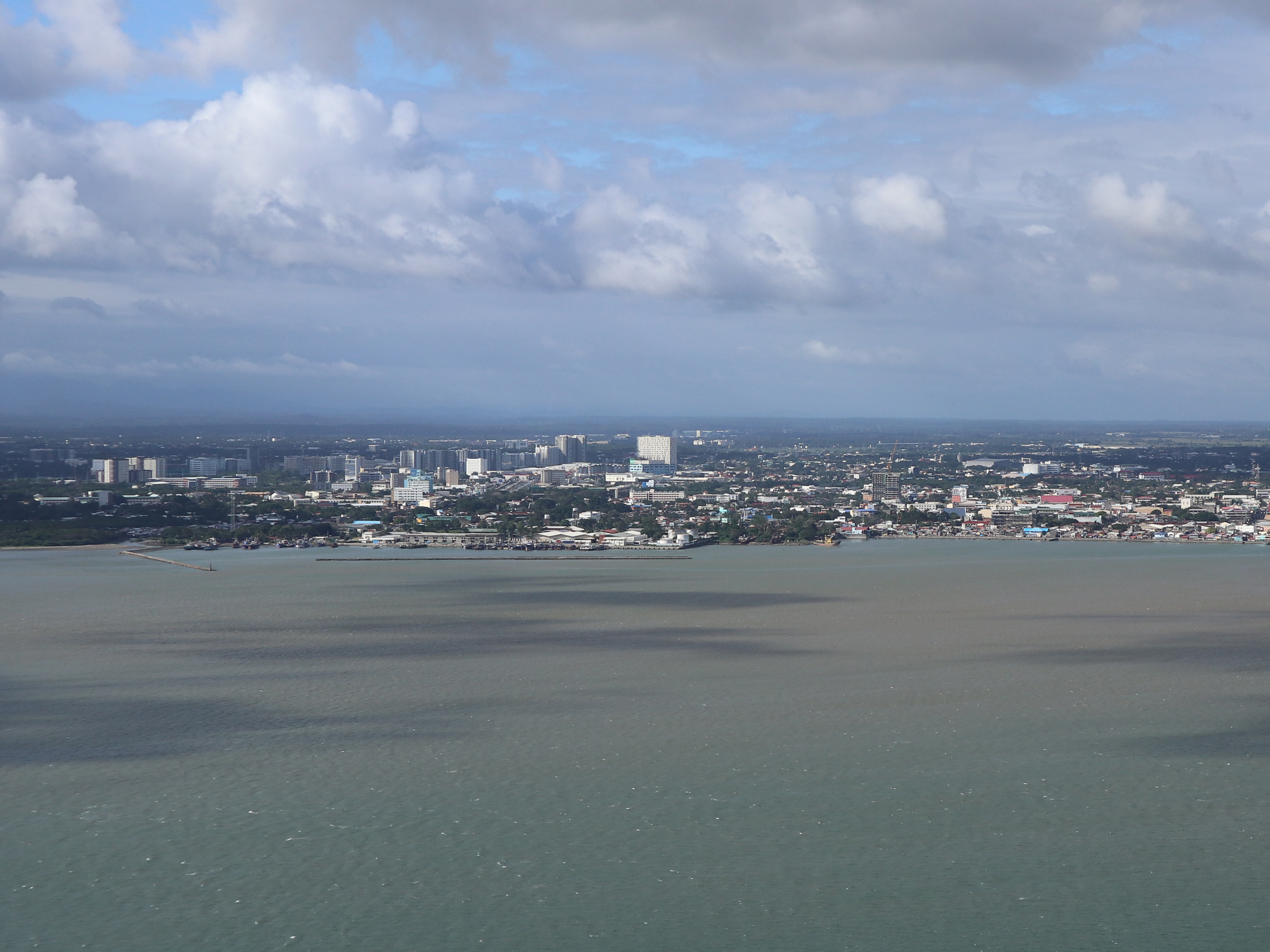
View of Metro Iloilo, seen from Balaan Bukid in Guimaras

The Metro Iloilo–Guimaras Economic Development Council, or MIGEDC, was formally established by President Gloria Macapagal-Arroyo through Executive Order No. 559, signed on August 28, 2006. It evolved from the Metro Iloilo Development Council (MIDC) that was earlier established by the City of Iloilo and four neighboring municipalities of Leganes, Oton, Pavia, and San Miguel on February 9, 2001, and the Guimaras–Iloilo City Alliance (GICA) that was similarly established on May 22, 2005. Through Executive Order No. 559, the municipality of Santa Barbara became an addition together with the province of Guimaras. After the opening of the new Iloilo International Airport in the municipality of Cabatuan in 2007, the town was also added to the metropolitan.

During the MIGEDC press conference in March 2022, Iloilo City Mayor and MIGEDC Chairman Jerry P. Treñas revealed that the municipalities of Dumangas and Zarraga had expressed their intention to join the MIGEDC in the near future. Velma Jane Lao, MIGEDC Executive Director, is also on the work on the expansion of the council and will be confirming if the other municipalities that have long signified to join are still interested.

As a strengthened task group, the MIGEDC formulates, implements, coordinates, and monitors programs, projects, and activities that support the Mega-Region Economic Development Strategic Framework of the National Government. It was designed to help address the area’s emerging problems brought about by rapid urbanization and the spatial development challenges of tourism and economic development. The MIGEDC is gearing up to become a Smart Metropolitan.

The MIGEDC is composed of the following:

- Mayor, Iloilo City as Chairperson
- Provincial Governor, Province of Guimaras as Co-Chairperson
- Mayor, Municipality of Pavia, Iloilo
- Mayor, Municipality of San Miguel, Iloilo
- Mayor, Municipality of Oton, Iloilo
- Mayor, Municipality of Leganes, Iloilo
- Mayor, Municipality of Sta. Barbara, Iloilo
- Mayor, Municipality of Cabatuan, Iloilo
- President, League of Municipalities, Province of Guimaras

== See also ==
- Metro Manila
- Metro Cebu
