= Panay–Guimaras–Negros Island Bridges =

- Crosses: Iloilo Strait; Guimaras Strait

Characteristics
- Total length: 32.47 km (20.18 mi)
- No. of spans: 2
- First section length: 4.97 km (3.09 mi)
- Second section length: 13.11 km (8.15 mi)

History
- Construction start: 2027 (projected)
- Construction cost: ₱189 billion

The Panay–Guimaras–Negros (PGN) Island Bridges is a planned network of bridges in the Visayas in the Philippines connecting the islands of Panay, Guimaras, and Negros.

== History ==
=== Earlier proposals ===
There were several proposals to build bridges linking the islands in Visayas. Plans to connect Guimaras and Panay was proposed as early as the president Corazon Aquino's administration of 1986 to 1992. In 1999, the Japan International Cooperation Agency created a master plan for two bridges connecting Panay, Guimaras, and Negros; the first bridge, spanning 20.6 kilometers (12.8 mi), was planned to link Leganes, Iloilo to Buenavista, Guimaras, while the second bridge also measuring 20.6 kilometers (12.8 mi) was meant to connect San Lorenzo, Guimaras to Pulupandan, Negros Occidental. The Department of Public Works and Highways conducted a study on building bridges that would connect Panay, Guimaras, and Negros which were projected to require a ₱28.5 billion budget if the bridges are to be built.

In 2013, Governors Arthur Defensor Sr. of Iloilo and Alfredo Marañón Jr. of Negros Occidental made an alternative proposal that would bypass Guimaras and directly link Banate (in Iloilo) and E.B. Magalona (in Negros Occidental) via a 14.5 kilometers (9.0 mi) bridge.

=== Chinese-funded proposal ===
The PGN Island Bridges is part of the Philippine government's National Islands-Link Projects. The project which was tagged part of President Rodrigo Duterte's Build! Build! Build! program consist of two bridges the 2.7 km (1.7 mi) Panay–Guimaras Bridge (Phase I) and the 4.8 km (3.0 mi) Panay–Guimaras Bridge (Phase II). A third phase connecting Negros and Cebu islands with a 8 km (5.0 mi) was also earlier proposed. Construction was project to start early 2019 and was to be funded by the Chinese government through a grant. The Chinese investors reportedly lost interest in 2020.

=== Current project ===
By May 2022, the local Philippine governments are now negotiating an alternative proposal from South Korean government for the PGN Island Bridges. The project was inherited by president Bongbong Marcos's administration. The project, with funding from the Export–Import Bank of Korea underwent another feasibility study involving Yooshin Engineering with Kyong-Ho Engineering and Architects, Dohwa Engineering, Soosung Engineering and Dasan Consultants in 2024.

The Section A or the Panay–Guimaras portion's construction was to start in mid-2025 and finished by the end of June 2028. Section B or the Guimaras–Negros portion is scheduled for completion by 2030. The whole project including the connecting roads is estimated to cost ₱189 billion. However, in September 2025, President of South Korea Lee Jae Myung announced that project financing had been suspected due to corruption concerns. Philippine Department of Economy, Planning, and Development representatives later stated that the funds suspended were "related to a different project...a project that did not even materialize" and that the bridge would proceed as planned. After the Philippine News Agency announced that the project was set to begin in July 2026, the start date was later pushed back to 2027 due to engineering changes related to seabed foundation for the Panay-Guimaras segment of the bridge.

== Specification ==
The whole Panay–Guimaras–Negros Island Bridges network, including connecting in-land roads, will be 32-kilometer (20 mi) long. It has two sections.

Portion	Length		Connects	
Portion	Sea-crossing bridge	Total	Connects	
Section A (Panay–Guimaras)	4.97 km (3.09 mi)	13 km (8.1 mi)	Leganes, Iloilo	Buenavista, Guimaras
Section B (Guimaras–Negros)	13.11 km (8.15 mi)	19.47 km (12.10 mi)	San Lorenzo, Guimaras	Pulupandan, Negros Occidental

== See also ==
- Cebu–Bohol Bridge
- Mindoro–Batangas Super Bridge
- San Juanico Bridge
