= Pavia, Iloilo =

Municipality in Iloilo, Philippines

Pavia
- Municipality
- Municipality of Pavia
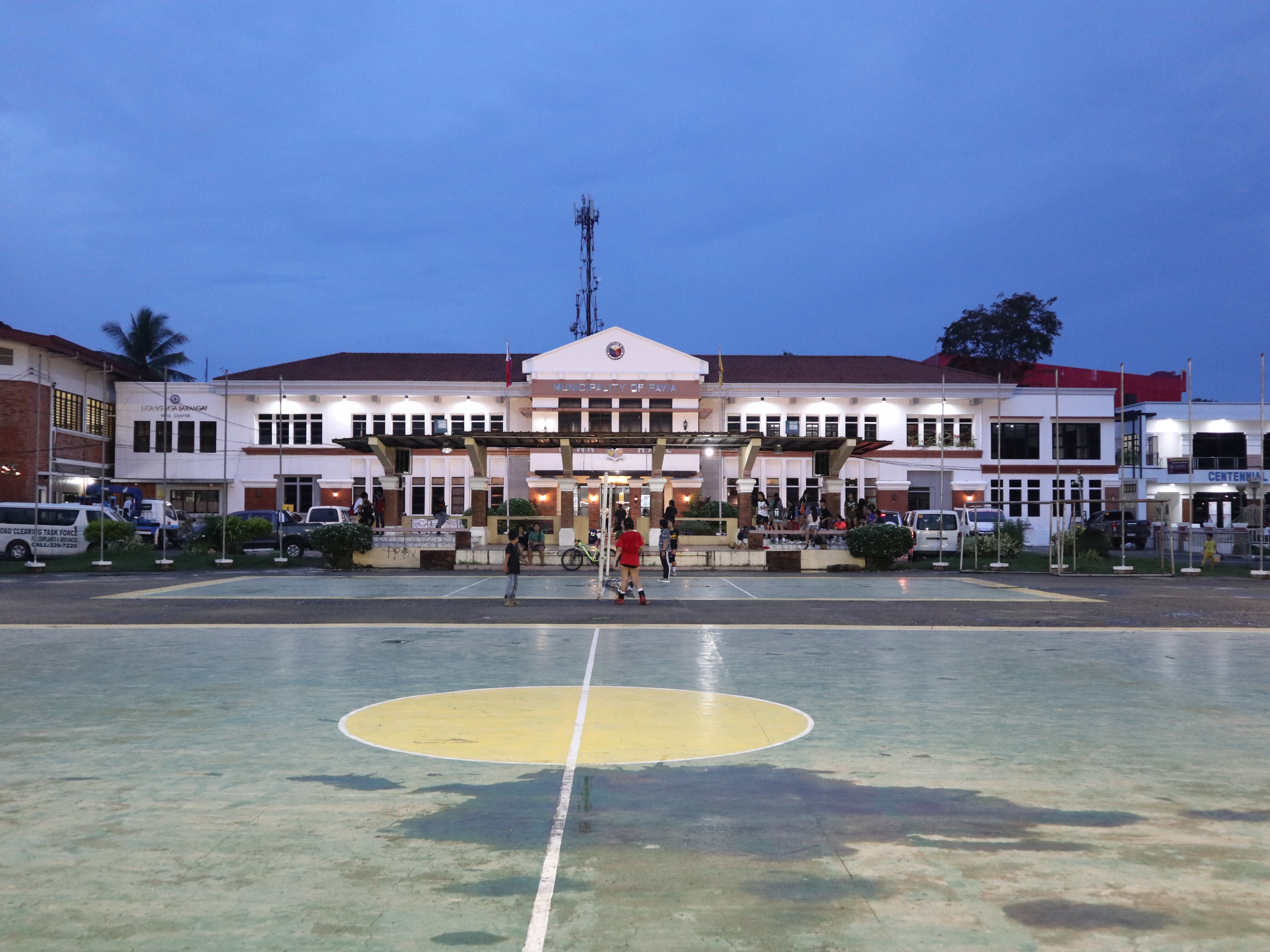
- Pavia Municipal Hall

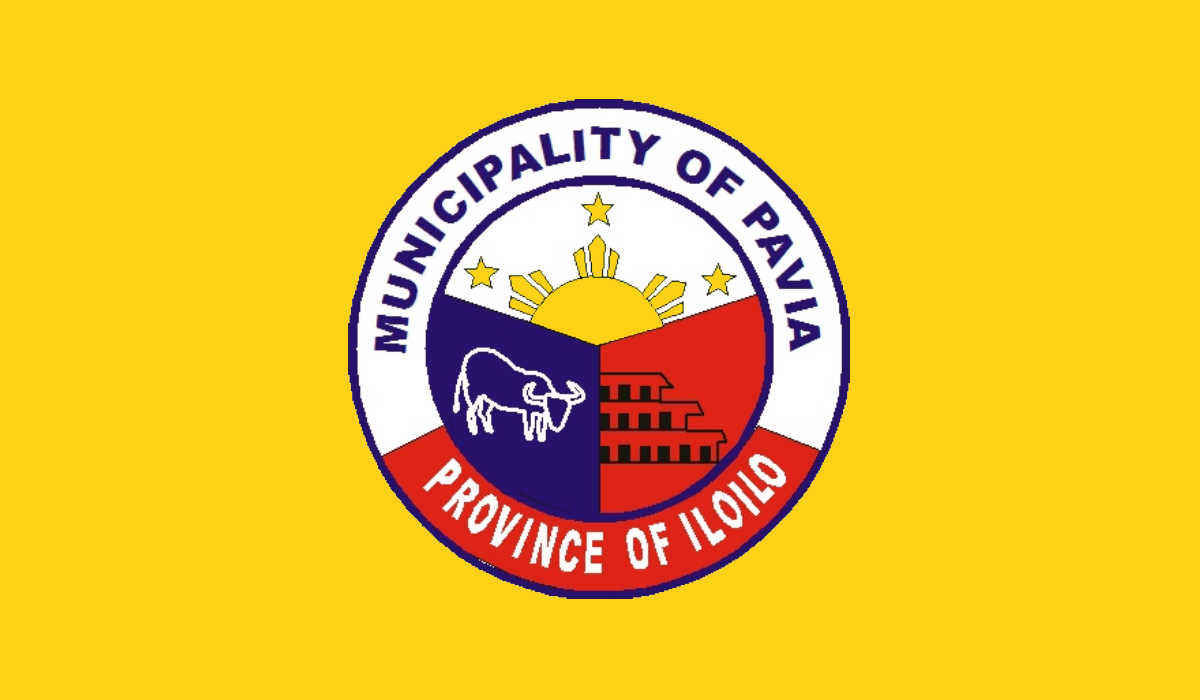
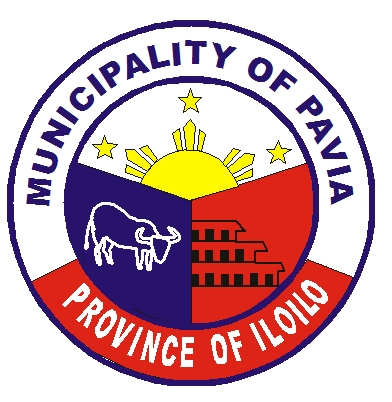
- Flag Seal
- Nickname: Regional Agro-Industrial Center for Western Visayas
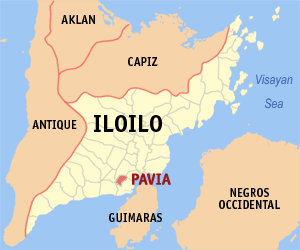
- Map of Iloilo with Pavia highlighted
- Interactive map of Pavia
- Location within the Philippines
- Coordinates: 10°46′30″N 122°32′30″E
- Country: Philippines
- Region: Western Visayas
- Province: Iloilo
- District: 2nd district
- Founded: 1848
- Barangays: 18 (see Barangays)

Government
  - Type: Sangguniang Bayan
  - Mayor: Laurence Anthony G. Gorriceta (Nacionalista)
  - Vice Mayor: Edsel G. Gerochi (Nacionalista)
  - Representative: Kathryn Joyce F. Gorriceta (Lakas)
  - Municipal Council: Members: Leonardo L. Belasa (Ind); Joshua Philippe B. Gumban (PFP); Jo Jan Paul J. Peñol (Nacionalista); Ariel B. Gerada (Nacionalista); Daniel S. Fajardo, II (PFP); Kervin Matthew G. Zaldarriaga (Nacionalista); Joefritz C. Collado (Ind); Rhia B. Sotomil (Nacionalista); Ludovico S. Alfaro ^{‡}; Gerard Peter G. Zaldarriaga ^{◌}; ‡ ex officio ABC president; ◌ ex officio SK chairman
  - Electorate: 39,701 voters (2025)

Area
  - Total: 27.15 km^{2} (10.48 sq mi)
- Elevation: 15 m (49 ft)
- Highest elevation: 51 m (167 ft)
- Lowest elevation: 1 m (3.3 ft)

Population (2024 census)
  - Total: 74,594
  - Density: 2,747/km^{2} (7,116/sq mi)
  - Households: 17,177
- Demonym: Pavianhon

Economy
  - Income class: 1st municipal income class
  - Poverty incidence: 3.48% (2023)
  - Revenue: ₱ 417.6 million (2024)
  - Assets: ₱ 1,612 million (2024)
  - Expenditure: ₱ 190.2 million (2024)
  - Liabilities: ₱ 399 million (2024)

Service provider
  - Electricity: Iloilo 1 Electric Cooperative (ILECO 1)
- Time zone: UTC+8 (PST)
- ZIP code: 5001
- PSGC: 063036000
- IDD : area code: +63 (0)33
- Native languages: Hiligaynon; Karay-a; Tagalog
- Website: www.pavia-iloilo.gov.ph

Pavia, officially the Municipality of Pavia ([paˈvia], Hiligaynon: Banwa sang Pavia, Tagalog: Bayan ng Pavia), is a municipality in the province of Iloilo, Philippines. According to the 2024 census, it has a population of 74,594 people.

The town is known as the regional agro-industrial center, home to numerous manufacturing companies. It is 10 kilometres (6.2 mi) north of Iloilo City and is part of the Metro Iloilo–Guimaras area.

== Etymology ==
How the town got its name is unclear, and has long been disputed. One theory has it that the name came from a certain Colonel Pavia of the Spanish garrison in Iloilo who was supposedly responsible for initially establishing a Spanish presence in the area. Others believe that the name is a Spanish corruption of the Hiligaynon word biya-biya, as the area was originally considered a neglected patch of land that served mostly as a camping ground for city sophisticates and absentee landlords. Others claim that the town was named after a Spanish governor-general, Manuel Pavia y Lay, Marquis of Novaliches, who eventually became a priest after his short tenure in the Philippines from 1853 to 1854. However, the more credible theory seems to be the overlooked fact that the town's religious well-being was placed under the jurisdiction and supervision of the friars of the Augustinian Order, and they simply named the place in honor of the town of Pavia, Italy, where the founder of their order, Saint Augustine, was buried.

The last theory seems to be supported by circumstantial historical evidence: it was also in 1862 that an independent parish dedicated to Saint Monica was established by an Augustinian friar, Policarpio Minayo. But it was only in 1889 when construction of the famous brick church—as it now stands—began. It was envisioned and built in the Byzantine style, with Romanesque design elements. Two Greek crosses dominate the facade, and the transept is round set against the rear wall. It is unique in the whole of Panay Island, as it is the only church built entirely of red brick, inside and out. Quite significantly, the church design was apparently inspired by the ancient royal arched basilica of San Michele Maggiore in Pavia, Italy—minus the front columns.

== History ==
Pavia was initially settled by primitive Malays, followed by the arrival of Chinese immigrants between the 15th and 16th centuries. Archaeological excavations at a Chinese burial ground in Cabugao Sur have provided evidence of these early settlements, suggesting a population of around 200 to 400.

During the Spanish Colonial Era, Pavia officially separated from the town of Jaro and was established as an independent entity in 1848. Thirteen landowners came together to transform what was once a "camping place," a "settlement place," or an "abandoned place" into a thriving community.

Over time, Pavia experienced changes in its administrative status. It became part of Santa Barbara in 1901 and then joined Iloilo City in 1904. However, in 1907, Pavia, along with Leganes and Jaro, seceded from Iloilo City to form the suburb of Jaro. Petronilo Gumban served as the leader of Pavia from 1916 until his election as Presidente Municipal of Jaro in 1920. In 1921, under the leadership of Delfin Gumban, Pavia regained its status as an independent municipality.

In the 21st century, Pavia has rapidly emerged as one of the most populous suburban areas within the Iloilo metropolitan area. Once known primarily as a hub for the province's agricultural industry, the town has steadily transformed into a thriving center of commerce, largely influenced by its proximity to Iloilo City. Major developers such as Sta. Lucia Land, Robinsons Land, and International Builders Corporation have invested in the area.

== Geography ==
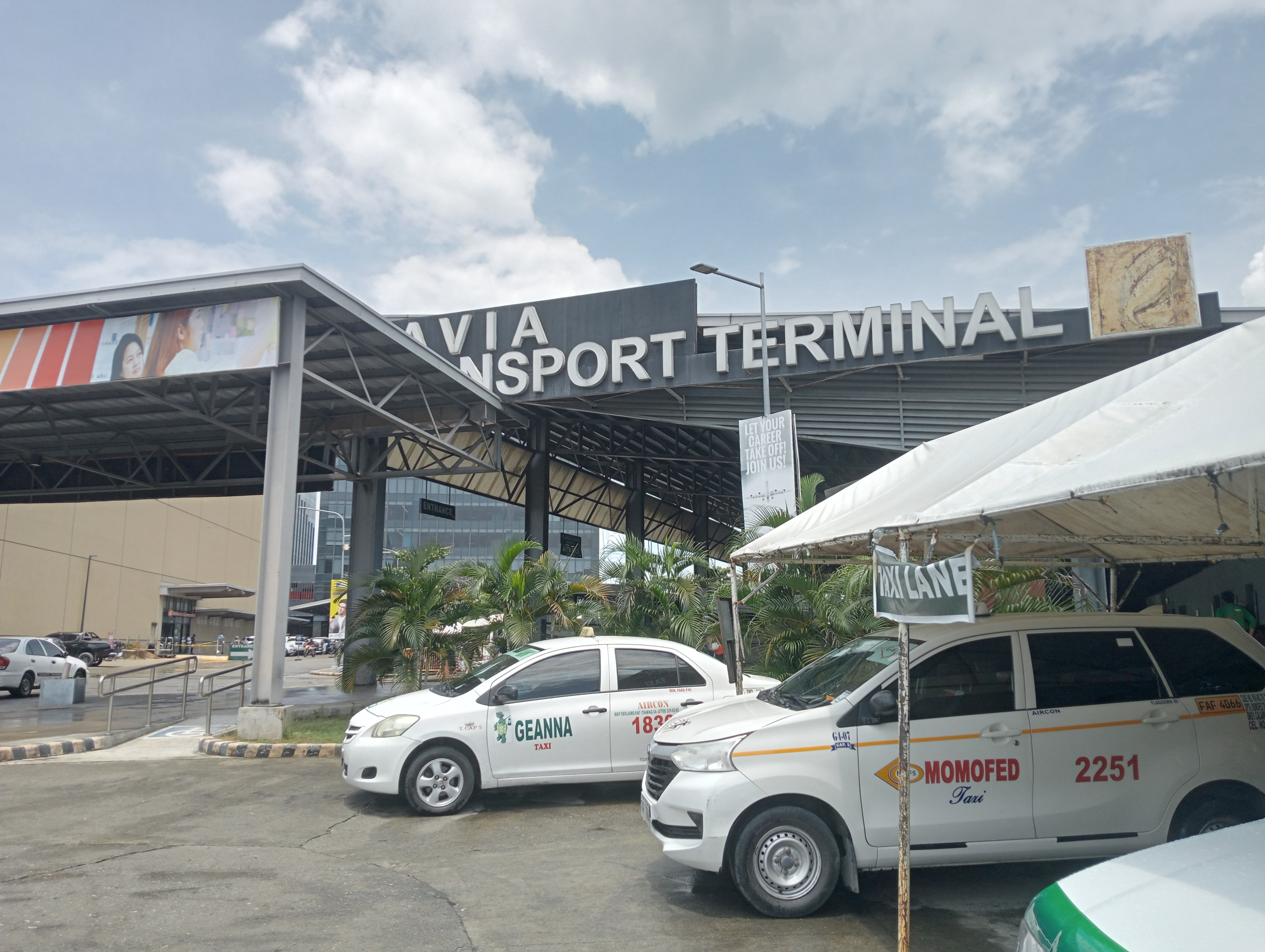
Pavia Transport Terminal

Pavia is 10 kilometres (6.2 mi) north of Iloilo City. It is bordered by the Iloilo City districts of Jaro and Mandurriao to the east and south, respectively; the towns of Leganes to the northeast; Santa Barbara to the north; San Miguel to the west; and Oton to the southwest. Pavia is a part of Metro Iloilo-Guimaras area. Due to its close proximity to the urban core of the metropolitan area, it is one of the most urbanized towns in the province.

Pavia is the smallest municipality in terms of area in Iloilo, covering only 2,715 hectares (6,710 acres). The municipality is the Regional Agro-Industrial Center for Western Visayas.

=== Barangays ===
Pavia is politically subdivided into 18 barangays. Each barangay consists of puroks and some have sitios.

- Aganan
- Amparo
- Anilao
- Balabag
- Purok I (Poblacion)
- Purok II (Poblacion)
- Purok III (Poblacion)
- Purok IV (Poblacion)
- Cabugao Norte
- Cabugao Sur
- Jibao-an
- Mali-ao
- Pagsanga-an
- Pal-agon
- Pandac
- Tigum
- Ungka I
- Ungka II

=== Climate ===
Climate data for Iloilo, Philippines (1961–1990, extremes 1903–2012)
Month	Jan	Feb	Mar	Apr	May	Jun	Jul	Aug	Sep	Oct	Nov	Dec	Year
Record high °C (°F)	34.7 (94.5)	35.5 (95.9)	39.0 (102.2)	37.5 (99.5)	37.8 (100.0)	37.5 (99.5)	35.2 (95.4)	34.8 (94.6)	37.8 (100.0)	35.4 (95.7)	34.8 (94.6)	34.5 (94.1)	39.0 (102.2)
Mean daily maximum °C (°F)	29.7 (85.5)	30.2 (86.4)	31.7 (89.1)	33.1 (91.6)	33.1 (91.6)	31.6 (88.9)	30.7 (87.3)	30.4 (86.7)	30.8 (87.4)	31.1 (88.0)	30.9 (87.6)	30.2 (86.4)	31.1 (88.0)
Daily mean °C (°F)	26.1 (79.0)	26.5 (79.7)	27.6 (81.7)	28.9 (84.0)	29.1 (84.4)	28.1 (82.6)	27.6 (81.7)	27.5 (81.5)	27.6 (81.7)	27.7 (81.9)	27.5 (81.5)	26.8 (80.2)	27.6 (81.7)
Mean daily minimum °C (°F)	22.7 (72.9)	22.7 (72.9)	23.5 (74.3)	24.6 (76.3)	25.1 (77.2)	24.7 (76.5)	24.4 (75.9)	24.5 (76.1)	24.4 (75.9)	24.2 (75.6)	24.0 (75.2)	23.4 (74.1)	24.0 (75.2)
Record low °C (°F)	16.5 (61.7)	16.7 (62.1)	18.6 (65.5)	20.0 (68.0)	20.2 (68.4)	21.0 (69.8)	19.5 (67.1)	20.0 (68.0)	19.8 (67.6)	19.2 (66.6)	19.4 (66.9)	18.3 (64.9)	16.5 (61.7)
Average rainfall mm (inches)	39.9 (1.57)	19.1 (0.75)	27.1 (1.07)	47.7 (1.88)	117.9 (4.64)	255.2 (10.05)	313.2 (12.33)	363.7 (14.32)	266.8 (10.50)	264.1 (10.40)	174.8 (6.88)	64.2 (2.53)	1,953.7 (76.92)
Average rainy days (≥ 0.1 mm)	11	7	7	6	14	18	21	20	19	18	15	14	170
Average relative humidity (%)	82	80	75	73	77	82	85	85	85	84	84	83	81
Source 1: Climate Charts
Source 2: Deutscher Wetterdienst (rainy days), PAGASA (records)

== Demographics ==
Population census of Pavia
Year	Pop.	±% p.a.
1903	5,700	—
1939	8,918	+1.25%
1948	9,637	+0.87%
1960	11,258	+1.30%
1970	13,745	+2.01%
1975	15,180	+2.01%
1980	17,330	+2.68%
1990	23,814	+3.23%
1995	26,756	+2.21%
2000	32,824	+4.48%
2007	39,275	+2.51%
2010	43,614	+3.89%
2015	55,603	+4.73%
2020	70,388	+5.09%
2024	74,594	+1.40%
Source: Philippine Statistics Authority

Pavia is the fastest-growing municipality in the province, both in terms of economy and population.

In the 2024 census, the population of Pavia was 74,594 people, with a density of 2,700 inhabitants per square kilometre or 7,000 inhabitants per square mile.

=== Languages ===
Pavia, being a suburb of Iloilo City, Hiligaynon is also the most dominant language used by its residents. Karay-a is also being spoken, as well as Tagalog and English.

=== Religion ===
Roman Catholicism is the most dominant religion in this municipality.

== Economy ==
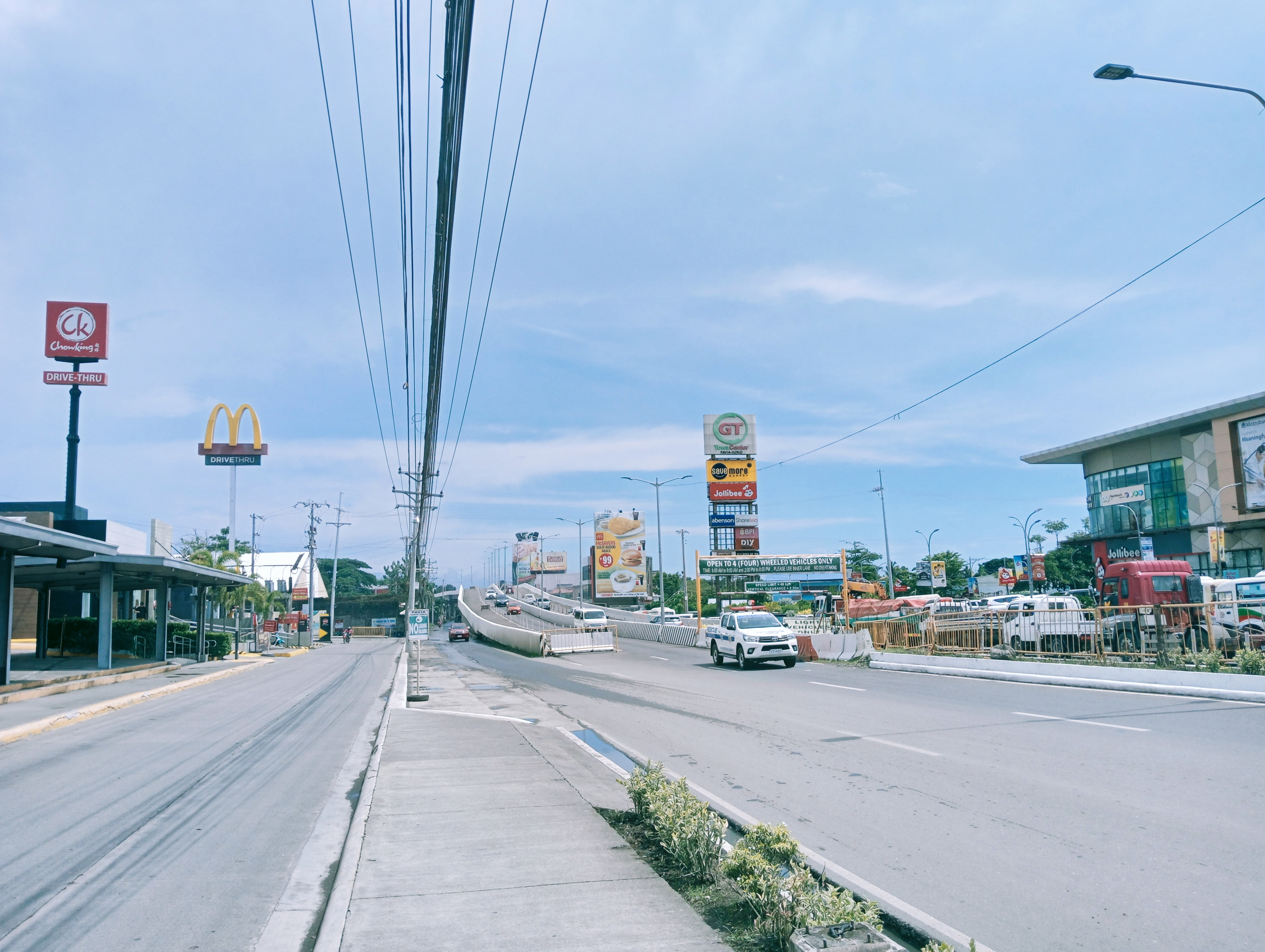
Sen. Benigno S. Aquino Jr. Avenue, a national highway that traverses Pavia, where major developments are mostly happening within the town

Poverty incidence of Pavia (%)

Source: Philippine Statistics Authority

Pavia has become one of the fastest-growing economies in Iloilo, with a mix of industries and developments. It serves as an agricultural-industrial center, hosting companies such as Vitarich Corporation and New Panay Agri-Ventures in Cabugao Sur. The town has developed into a commuter area with suburban neighborhoods including Green Meadows, Providence, Centro Verde, Parc Regency, Centennial Homes, and Deca Homes. Commercial establishments in Pavia include Mandaue Foam, CityMall, Puregold, GT Town Center, and Robinsons Place Pavia. It is also home to Panay News, a regional news media outlet.

Hotels in the town include Gateway Hotel, Sotogrande Hotel, and JECA MJC Hotel & Event Center. Healthcare services are available through facilities like Holy Mary Women and Children's Hospital. Major companies operating in Pavia include Robinsons Builders, Coca-Cola Bottling Company, and Taytay sa Kauswagan. One of the major developments in Pavia is the Hacienda Verde township by Sta. Lucia Land, Inc.

Pavia is known for baye baye, a delicacy made from young coconut meat, sugar, and pinipig. The town also has a pottery industry in Barangays Pandac and Jibao-an, producing clay pots, stoves, jars, and containers using open pit firing methods.

Attractions and shopping centers in Pavia

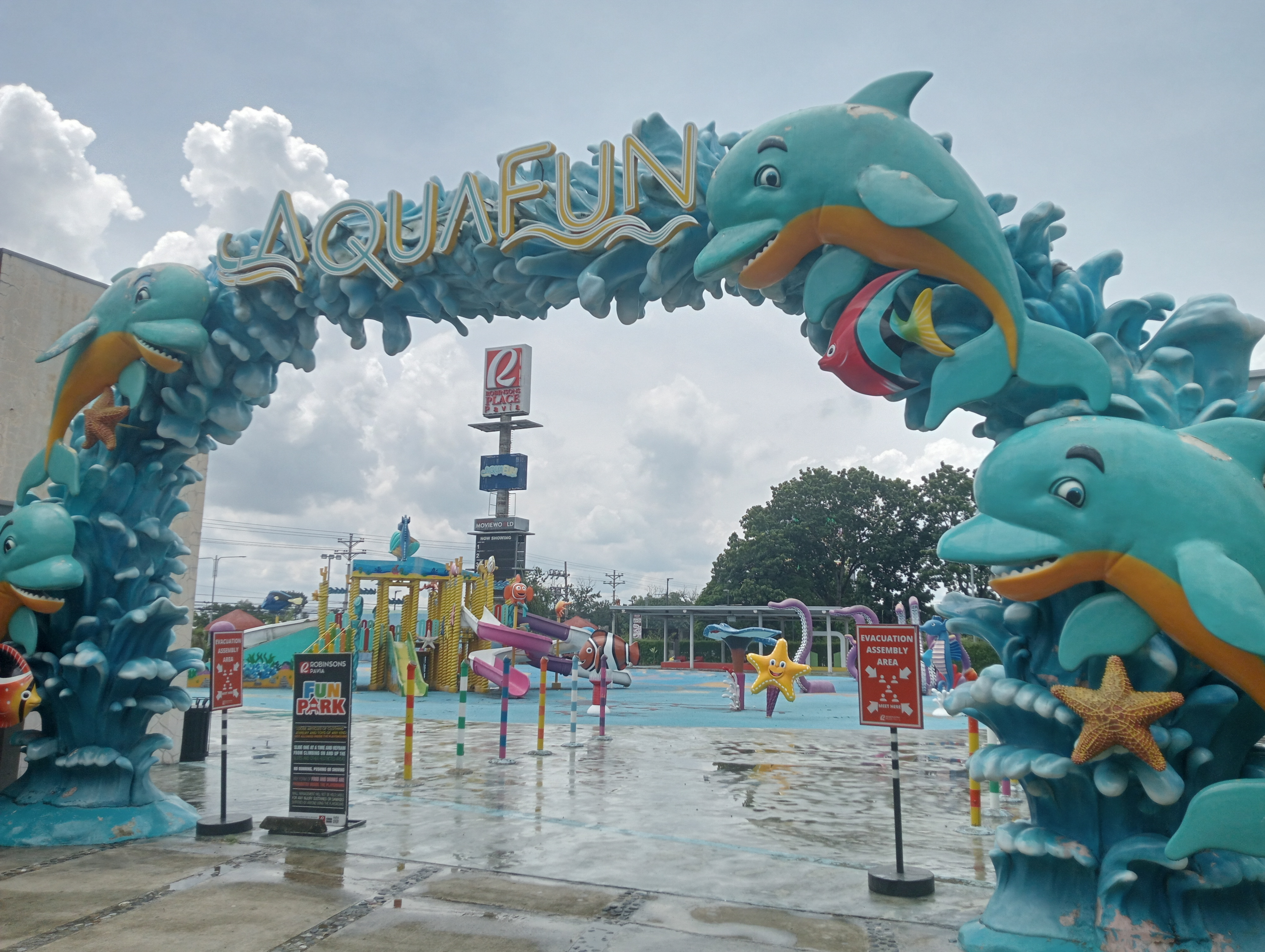
AquaFun Pavia

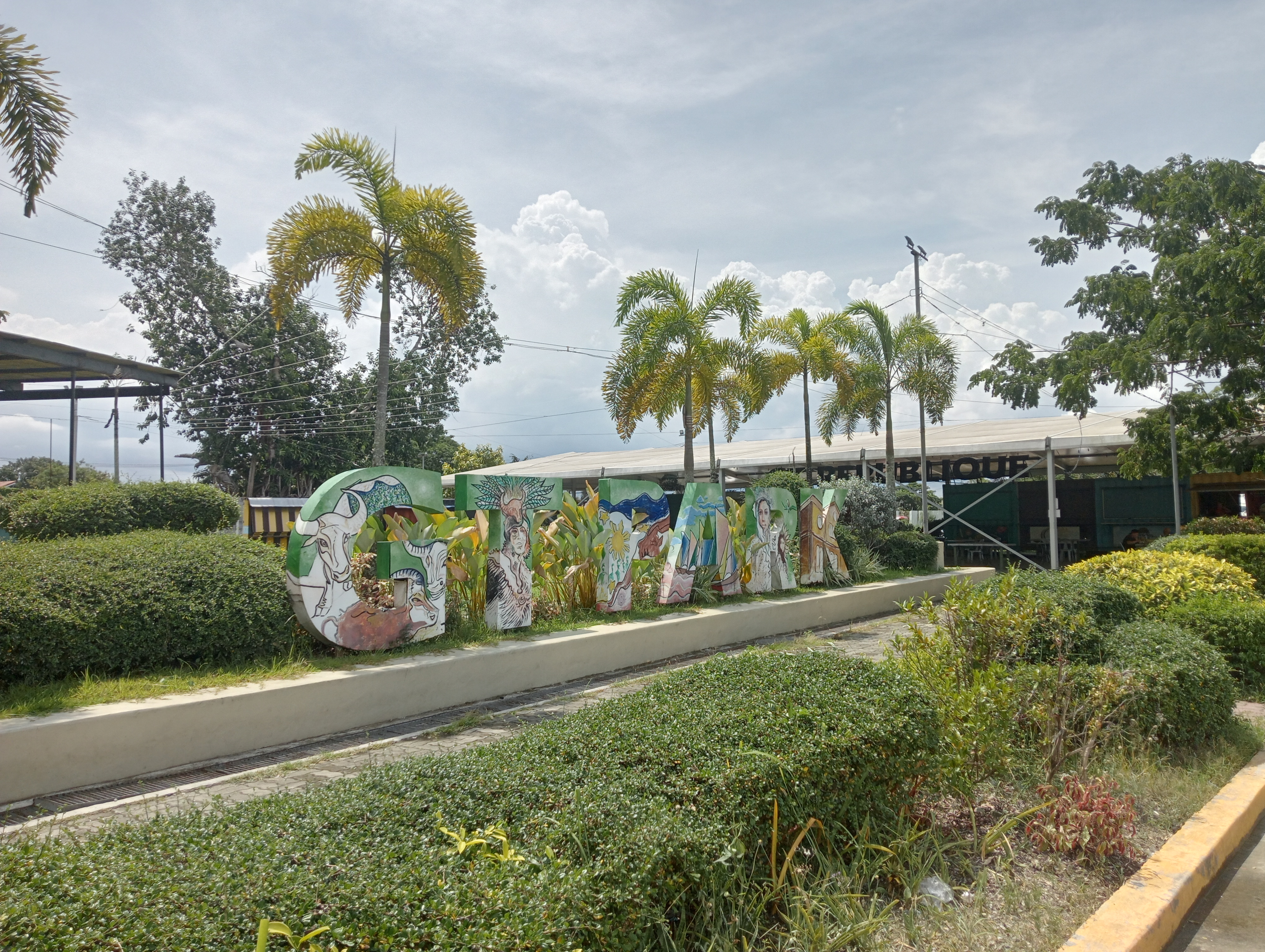
GT Park

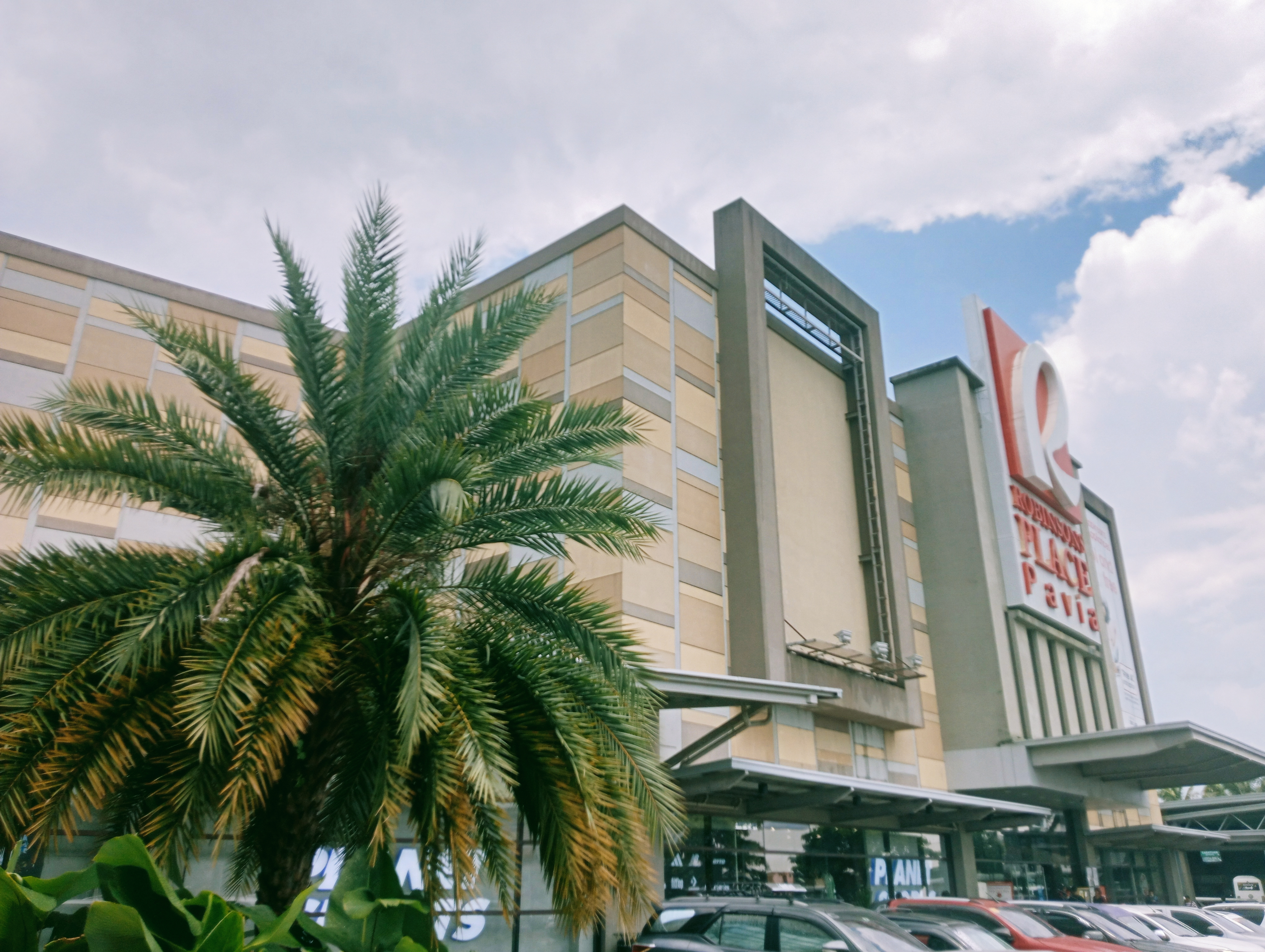
Robinsons Place Pavia

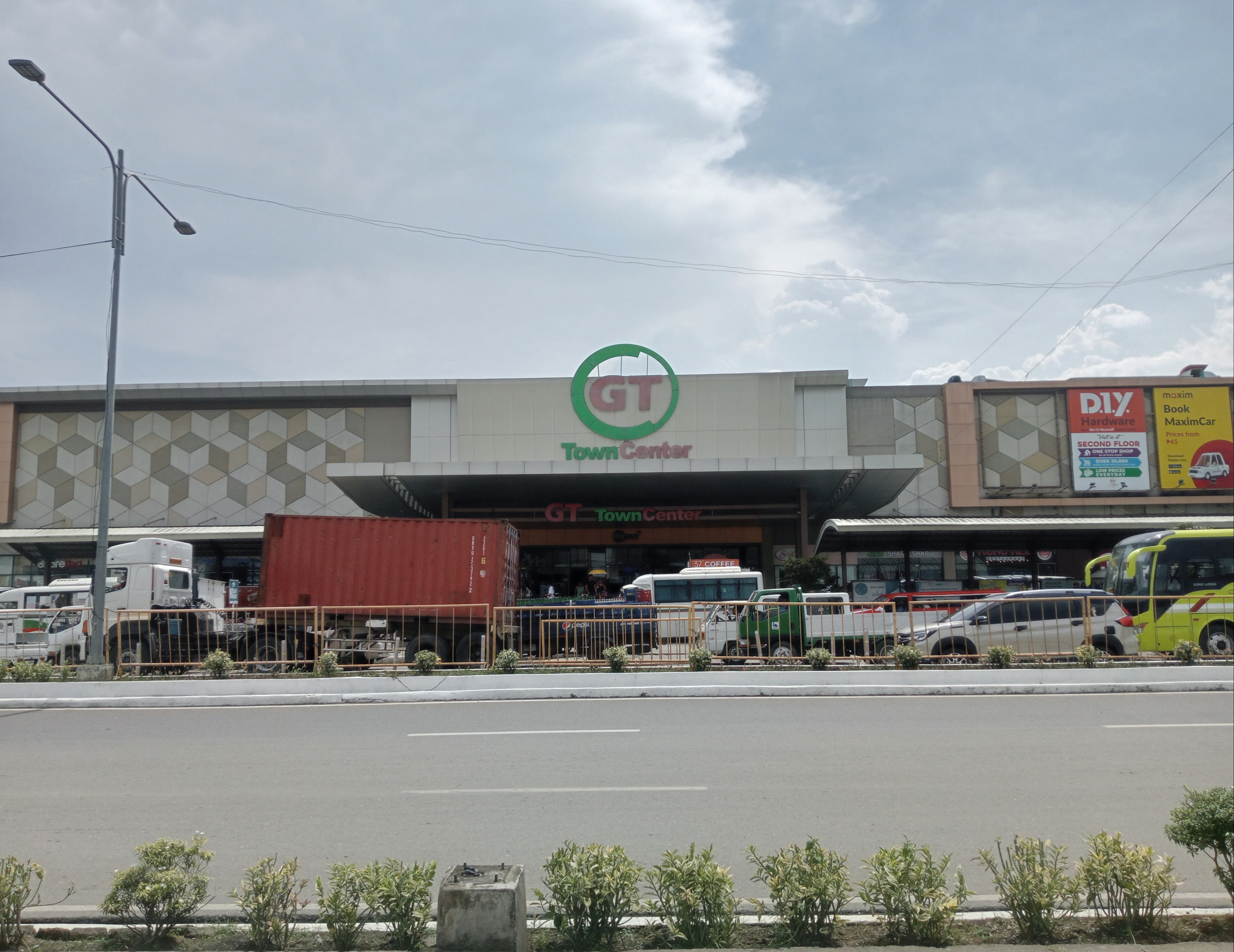
GT Town Center

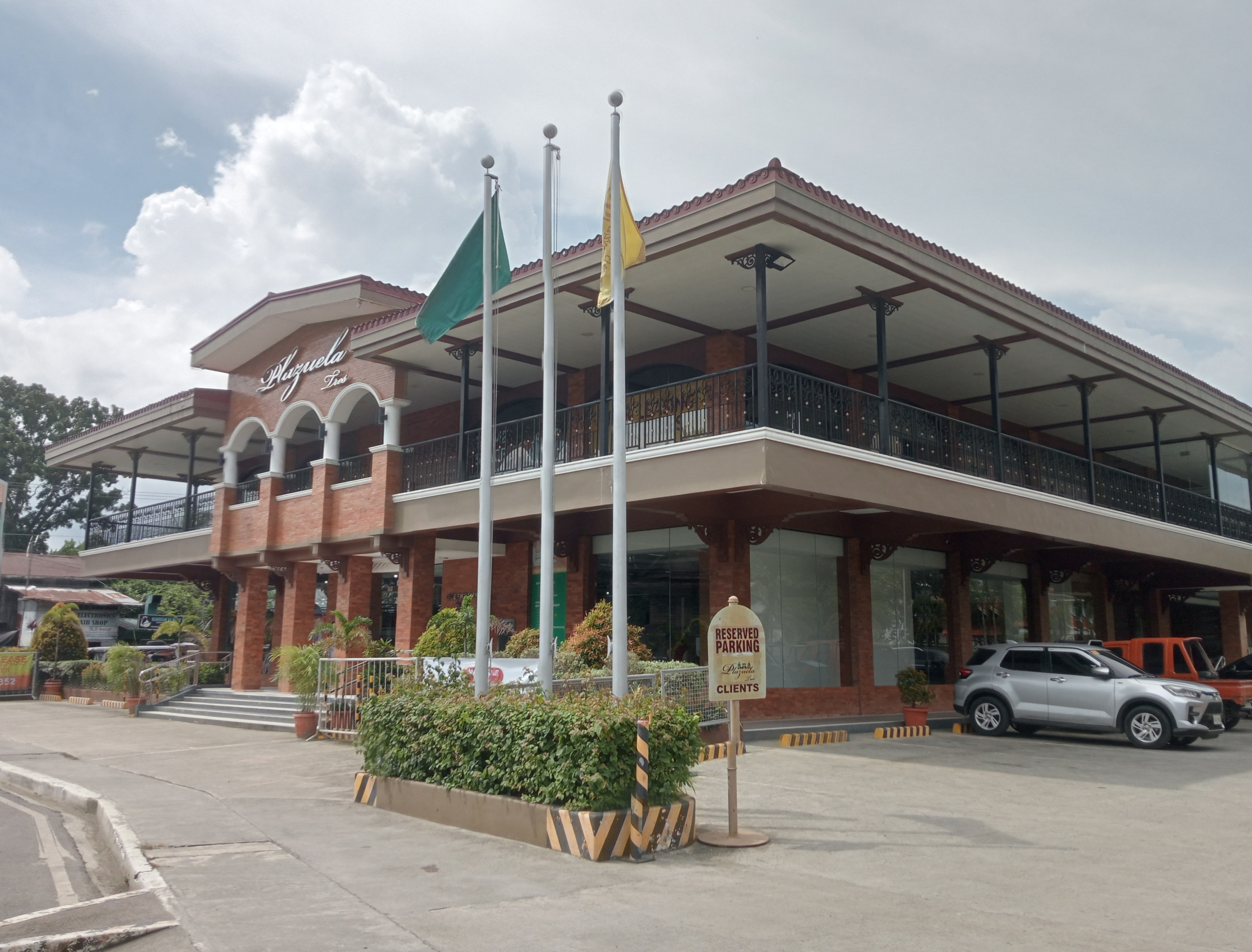
Plazuela Tres

== Government ==
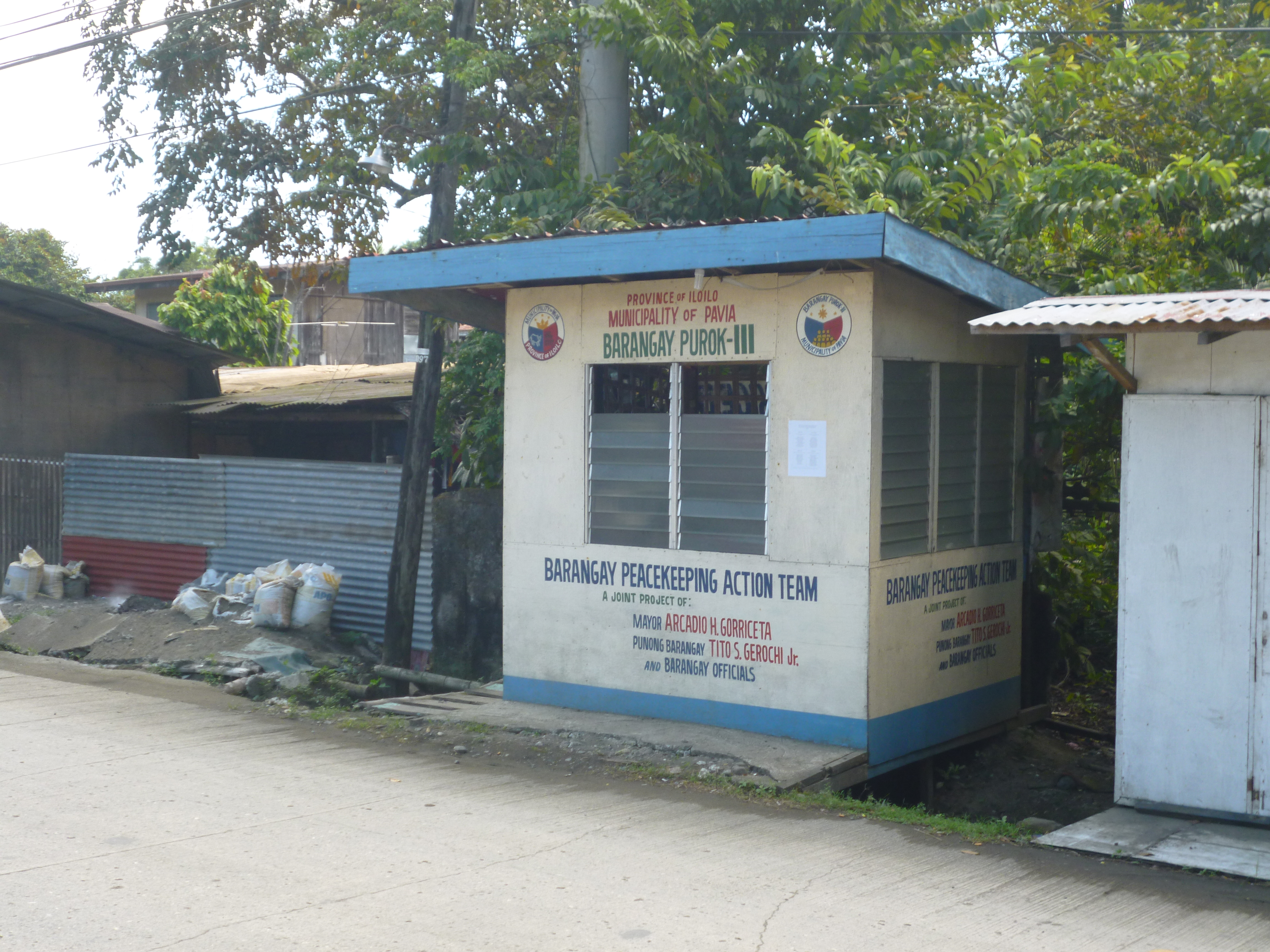
A Barangay Outpost in Pavia

Laurence Anthony G. Gorriceta is the incumbent mayor of Pavia.

=== List of former chief executives ===
The different Presidente Municipal (equivalent to Municipal Mayor now) who had served Pavia.

- Delfin Gumban (1901–1924) – known to be Pavia's Father of Independence
- Domingo Guillem (1924–1927)
- Simplicio Hechanova (1927–1934)
- Pacifico Jabonillo (1934–1942)
- Buenaventura Gumban (1942–1945) Resistance Civil Government
- Cornelio Gumban (1942–1945) Japanese Government
- Juan de Dios Gonzaga (1945–1946)
- Luzon Gumban (1946–1952)
- Vicente Gerochi (1952–1955)
- Florencio Hisole (1956–1959)
- Gerardo Gumban (1960–1971)
- Nelson Gumban (1972–1986)
- Luzon Gumban Jr. (1986–1994)
- Rogelio Trimañez (1994–1995) serving the unexpired term of Mayor Gorriceta
- Felix Caronongan, Jr. (March – June 1995)
- Ervin G. Gerochi (1995–2004)
- Arcadio H. Gorriceta (2004–2013)
- Michael B. Gorriceta (2013–2019)
- Laurence Anthony G. Gorriceta (2019–present)

== Culture ==
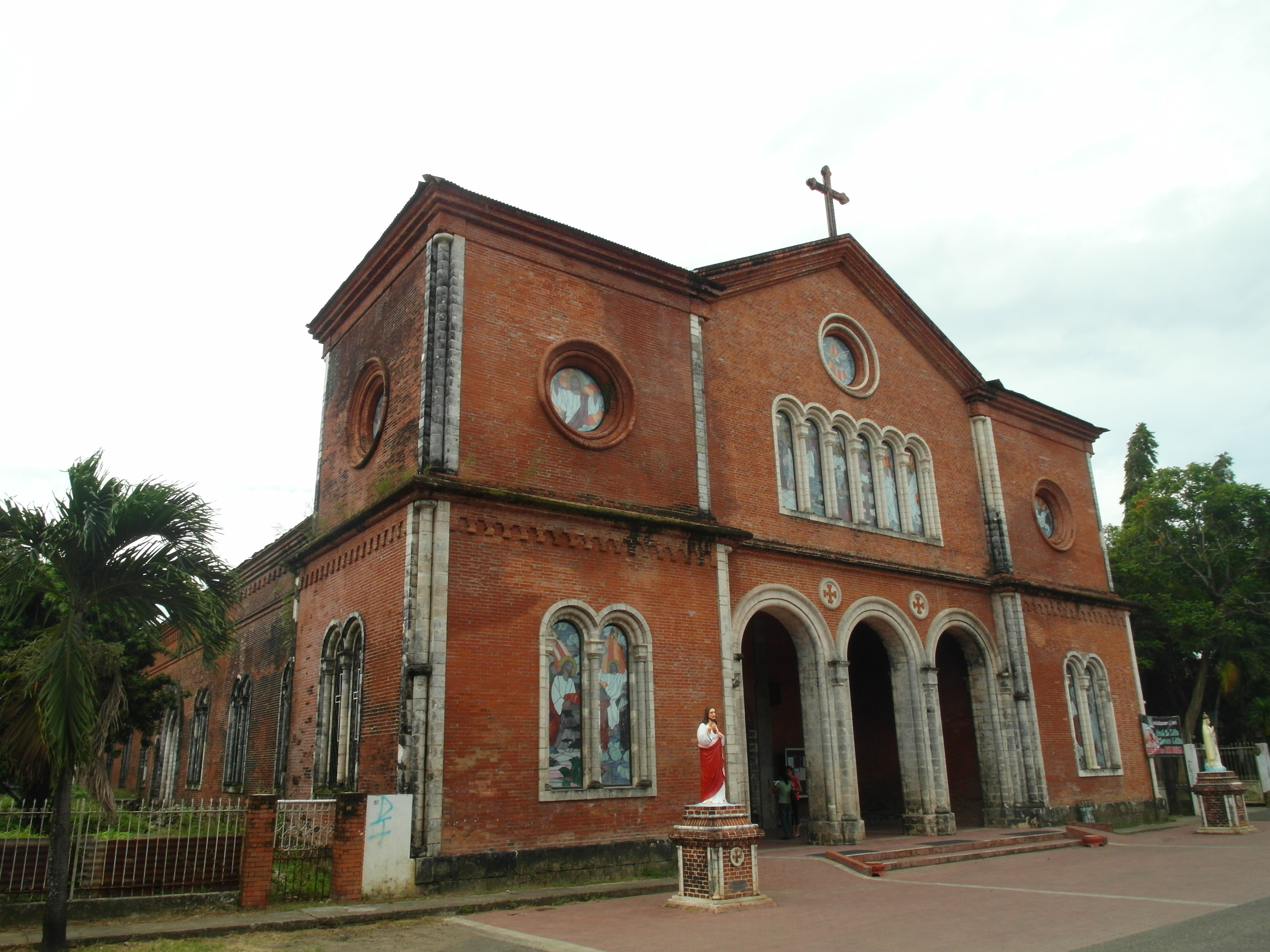
Sta. Monica Parish Church

=== Carabao-Carroza Race ===
Pavia, since 1973, holds the Carabao-Carroza Race Festival every 3 May. The Carabao is made the "king" for a day, and the race features carabaos each pulling a bamboo sled or "carrosa" on a 400-meter course. Carrozas with native designs are also paraded as part of festivities.

=== Tigkaralag Festival ===
The Tigkaralag festival is celebrated in consonance with All Souls' Day. The term "Tigkaralag" comes from the Ilonggo words, "tig," which means "season of," and "kalag," which means "soul". Participants from the municipality's 18 barangays wear costumes and parade themselves from Barangay Aganan to the town's plaza for a dance-drama competition with a storyline reflective of Tigkaralag. Held every 30th day of October, the festival was conceived by Cecilia H. Capadosa in 1992. Recently, Baye-baye night was included as a side event of the festival in celebration on one of the town's industry, the Baye-baye.

=== Pavia Parish Church ===
Pavia Parish Church, popularly known as Santa Monica Parish Church is a century-old church built by the Spanish Augustinian Fathers sometime in 1862. Its interior and exterior walls are made entirely of red-bricks, making it the only existing brick-constructed church in the island of Panay. This church is similar to the church of the town's namesake, Pavia in Italy.

== Education ==
Pavia has several academic institutions offering programs from preschool to senior high school. On October 7, 2024, the University of St. La Salle (USLS) announced its expansion in Pavia.
