= Buenavista, Guimaras =

Municipality in Guimaras, Philippines

Buenavista
- Municipality
- Municipality of Buenavista
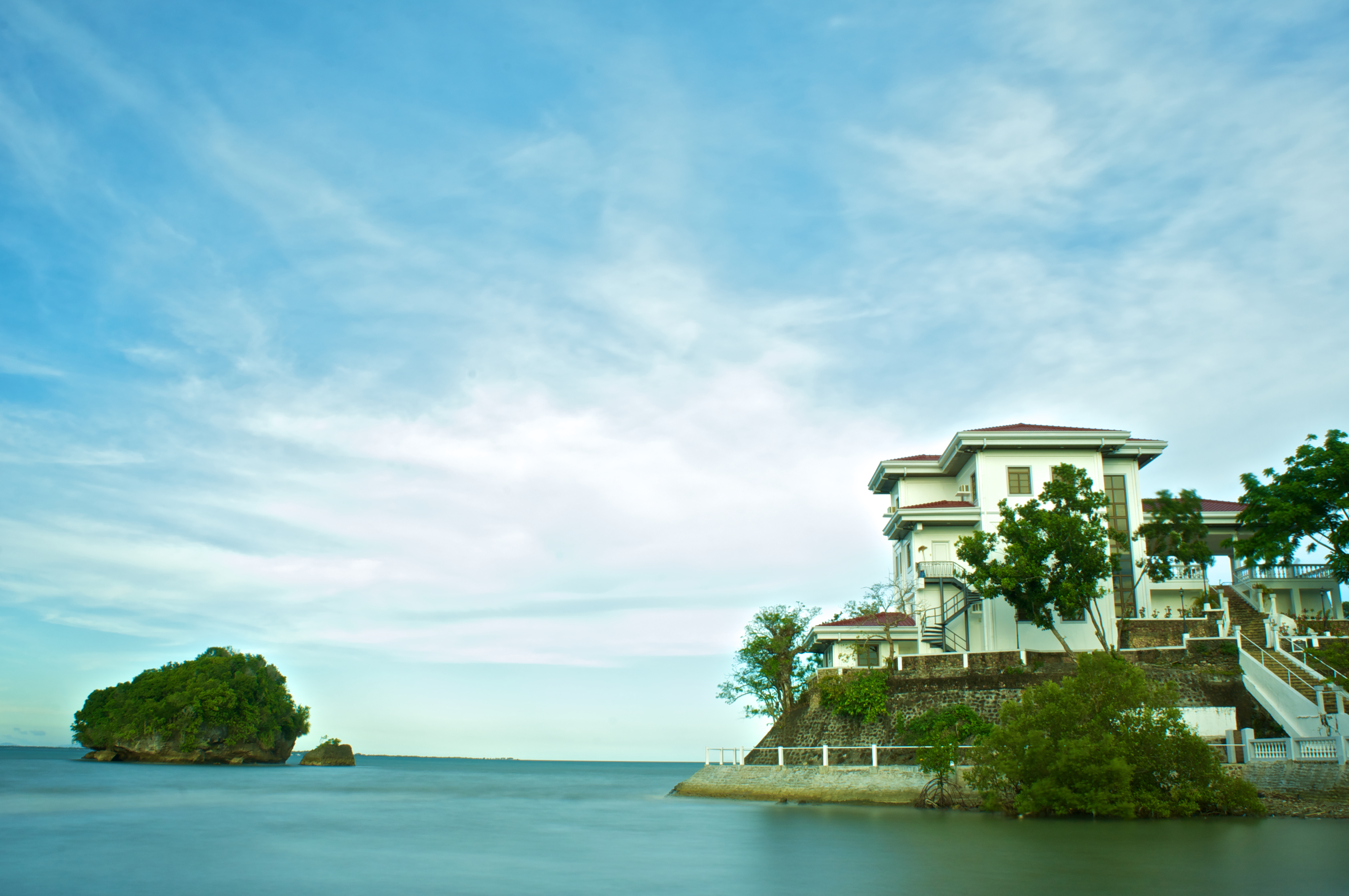
- Roca Encantada House

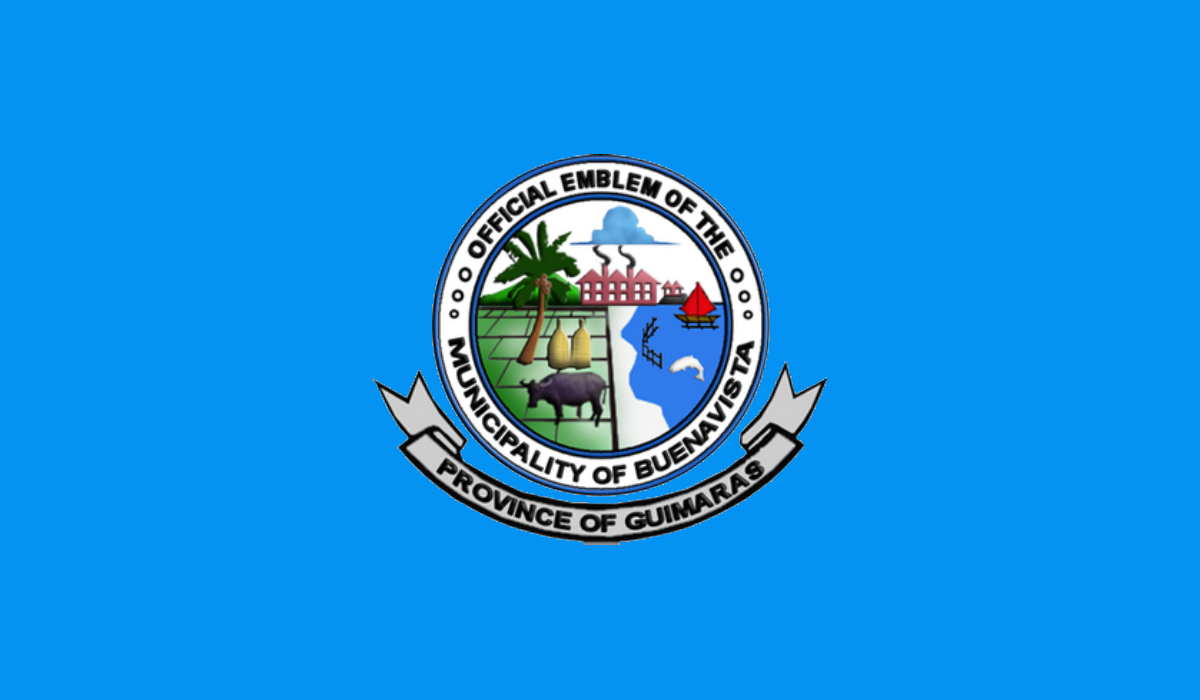
- Flag
- Interactive map of Buenavista
- Location within the Philippines
- Coordinates: 10°41′49″N 122°38′53″E
- Country: Philippines
- Region: Western Visayas
- Province: Guimaras
- District: Lone district
- Founded: 1775
- Barangays: 36 (see Barangays)

Government
  - Type: Sangguniang Bayan
  - Mayor: Samuel T. Gumarin (NUP)
  - Vice Mayor: Cyril C. Beltran (NUP)
  - Representative: JC Rahman Nava (NUP)
  - Municipal Council: Members: Paul C. Esmaya; Aurelio G. Tionado; Feonabelle G. Davis; Sean Aldrin L. Gatinao; Rex G. Fernandez; Rodney C. Zaragoza; Rubin Z. Magno; Valentin P. Talabero
  - Electorate: 36,823 voters (2025)

Area
  - Total: 128.26 km^{2} (49.52 sq mi)
- Elevation: 53 m (174 ft)
- Highest elevation: 133 m (436 ft)
- Lowest elevation: 0 m (0 ft)

Population (2024 census)
  - Total: 54,352
  - Density: 423.76/km^{2} (1,097.5/sq mi)
  - Households: 13,730

Economy
  - Income class: 1st municipal income class
  - Poverty incidence: 7.13% (2023)
  - Revenue: ₱ 226.5 million (2024)
  - Assets: ₱ 538.7 million (2024)
  - Expenditure: ₱ 116.2 million (2024)
  - Liabilities: ₱ 105 million (2024)

Service provider
  - Electricity: Guimaras Electric Cooperative (GUIMELCO)
- Time zone: UTC+8 (PST)
- ZIP code: 5044
- PSGC: 0607901000
- IDD : area code: +63 (0)33
- Native languages: Hiligaynon; Ati; Tagalog
- Website: buenavistaguimaras.gov.ph

Buenavista, officially the Municipality of Buenavista (Hiligaynon: Banwa sang Buenavista; Tagalog: Bayan ng Buenavista), is a municipality and the largest settlement in the province of Guimaras, Philippines. According to the 2024 census, it has a population of 54,352 people.

It is one of the five towns known for producing Guimaras mangoes, along with Jordan, San Lorenzo, Sibunag, and Nueva Valencia. The Guimaras mango, known for its sweetness, became the first product in the Philippines to receive geographical indication status.

== History ==
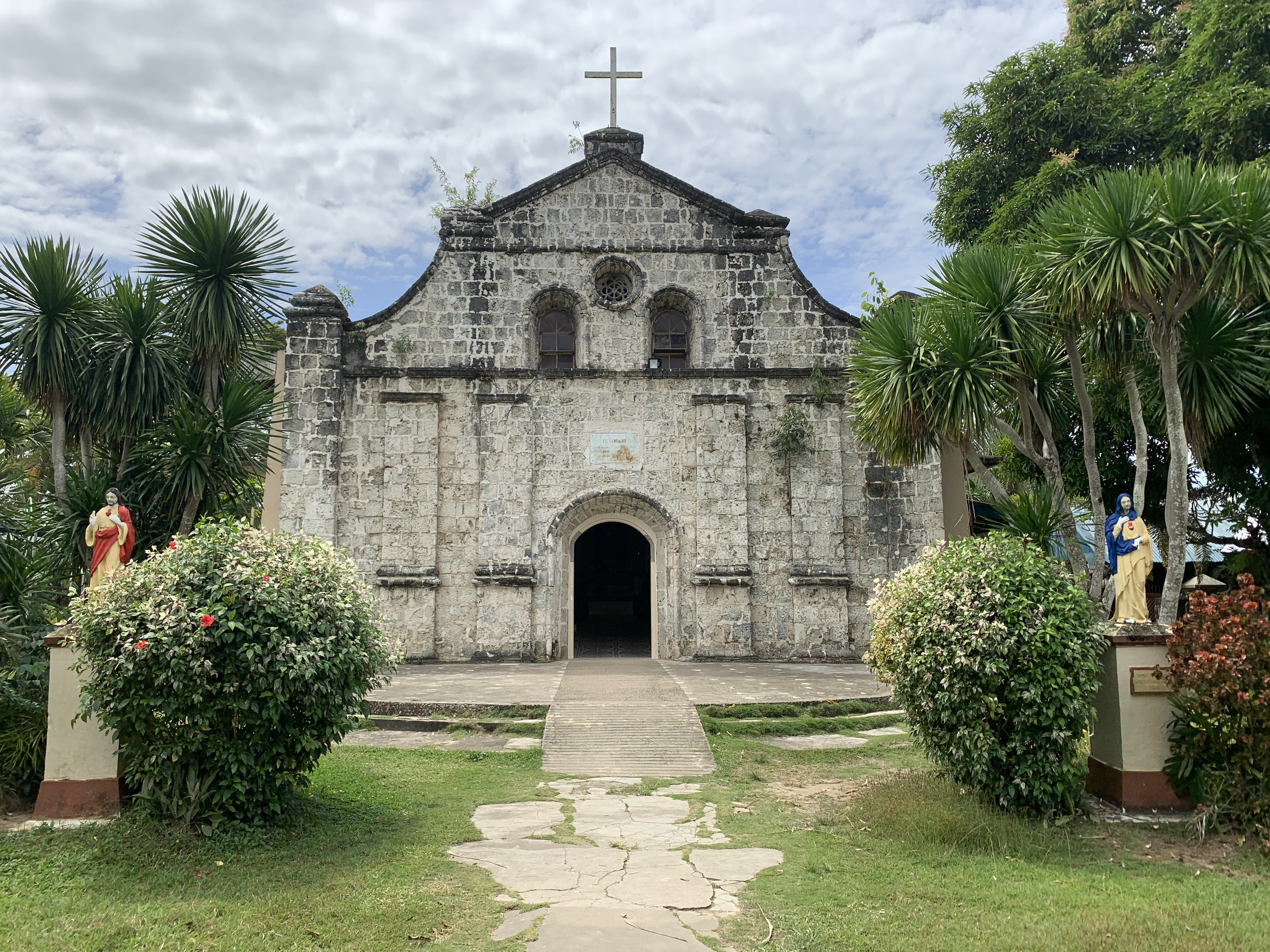
Navalas Church, the oldest Roman Catholic church in Guimaras

Buenavista is the oldest municipality on Guimaras. It was established in 1775, during the Spanish colonial period. A Spanish governor general was reputedly impressed by the scenery of the location, and called the place Buenavista, Spanish for "beautiful view".

Santo Rosario was formerly known as Baybay, while Salvacion's old name was Ambulong, and furthermore Old Poblacion's name was Daan Banwa.

== Geography ==
Buenavista is located at the northern tip of Guimaras Island. The northern and north-west part of the town overlooks Panay and the north-east portion faces Negros. Iloilo Strait lies between the town and Panay, and Guimaras Strait lies between the town and Negros. Buenavista is 17 kilometres (11 mi) from Jordan. Buenavista is a part of the Metro Iloilo–Guimaras area, centered on Iloilo City.

MacArthur's Wharf serves as the municipal wharf for Buenavista and part of San Lorenzo is used by passengers from Panay to Negros and vice versa. This transportation route serves as a cheaper link, rather than taking a ship.

Buenavista's terrain ranges from plains (nearly level in the central and north-west coastal areas) to mountains (north-western part).

=== Climate ===
Climate data for Buenavista, Guimaras
Month	Jan	Feb	Mar	Apr	May	Jun	Jul	Aug	Sep	Oct	Nov	Dec	Year
Mean daily maximum °C (°F)	30 (86)	31 (88)	32 (90)	33 (91)	32 (90)	30 (86)	29 (84)	29 (84)	28 (82)	29 (84)	30 (86)	30 (86)	30 (86)
Mean daily minimum °C (°F)	21 (70)	21 (70)	21 (70)	23 (73)	24 (75)	24 (75)	24 (75)	24 (75)	24 (75)	24 (75)	22 (72)	21 (70)	23 (73)
Average precipitation mm (inches)	19 (0.7)	17 (0.7)	26 (1.0)	37 (1.5)	119 (4.7)	191 (7.5)	258 (10.2)	260 (10.2)	248 (9.8)	196 (7.7)	97 (3.8)	39 (1.5)	1,507 (59.3)
Average rainy days	7.2	5.2	8.3	11.9	22.3	26.5	28.3	28.2	27.3	26.4	18.7	11.8	222.1
Source: Meteoblue

The climate is mild and cool, due to its being bounded by the sea on the three directions.

=== Barangays ===
Buenavista is politically subdivided into 36 barangays. Each barangay consists of puroks and some have sitios.

- Agsanayan
- Avila
- Banban
- Bacjao (Calumingan)
- Cansilayan
- Dagsaan
- Daragan
- East Valencia (Mantangingi)
- Getulio (Ili)
- Mabini
- Magsaysay
- McLain
- Montpiller
- Navalas
- Nazaret
- New Poblacion (Calingao)
- Old Poblacion (Daan Banwa)
- Piña
- Rizal
- Salvacion (Ambulong)
- San Fernando
- San Isidro
- San Miguel
- San Nicolas (Tabao)
- San Pedro (Bating)
- San Roque
- Santo Rosario
- Sawang
- Supang
- Tacay
- Taminla (Sambag)
- Tanag
- Tastasan
- Tinadtaran
- Umilig
- Zaldivar

== Demographics ==
Population census of Buenavista
Year	Pop.	±% p.a.
1903	10,533	—
1918	11,847	+0.79%
1939	15,494	+1.29%
1948	15,548	+0.04%
1960	22,587	+3.16%
1970	26,692	+1.68%
1975	30,154	+2.48%
1980	31,921	+1.15%
1990	41,435	+2.64%
1995	37,681	−1.76%
2000	41,717	+2.21%
2007	43,817	+0.68%
2010	46,703	+2.35%
2015	50,437	+1.48%
2020	52,899	+1.01%
2024	54,352	+0.65%
Source: Philippine Statistics Authority

In the 2024 census, the population of Buenavista was 54,352 people, with a density of 420 inhabitants per square kilometre or 1,100 inhabitants per square mile.

== Economy ==
Poverty incidence of Buenavista (%)

Source: Philippine Statistics Authority

== Transportation ==
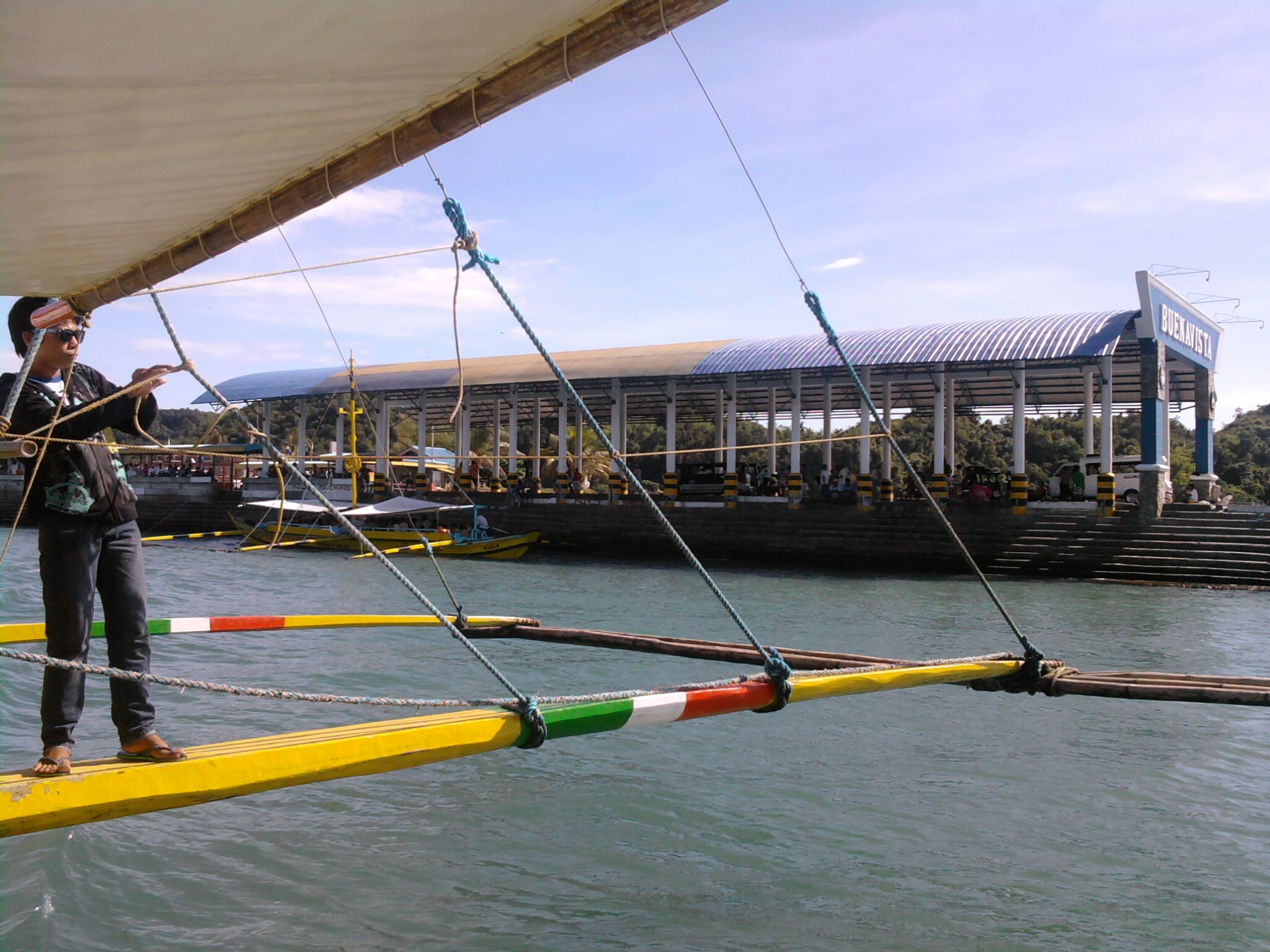
Buenavista, Guimaras ferry terminal for pump boats

There are passenger ferries, utilizing pump boats to Iloilo City. The ferry terminal in Iloilo is on the Iloilo River.

== Education ==
Buenavista is the center of higher education. The municipality has 19 public elementary schools, 5 public high schools, and 1 vocational technical school. It has a literacy rate of 98.4%, the highest in the whole of Guimaras.

There are two schools district offices which govern all educational institutions within the municipality. They oversee the management and operations of all private and public, from primary to secondary schools. These are the:

- Buenavista I Schools District
- Buenavista II Schools District

Primary and elementary schools

- Agsanayan Elementary School
- Avila Elementary School
- Buenavista SDA Elementary School
- Buenavista Central School
- Buenavista Lighthouse Christian Academy
- Cansilayan Elementary School
- Dagsaan Elementary School
- Daragan Elementary School
- East Valencia Elementary School
- Getulio Elementary School
- Grace Baptist Academy
- Good Shepherd's Fold
- Immaculate Heart of Mary Academy
- Mabini Primary School
- Navalas Elementary School
- Nazaret Elementary School
- Old Poblacion Elementary School
- Paaralan ng Buhay ng Calumingan
- Paaralan ng Buhay ng Montpiller
- Paaralan ng Buhay ng Sawang
- Paaralan ng Buhay ng Tacay
- Paaralan ng Buhay ng Tanag
- Piña Elementary School
- Rizal Primary School
- Salvacion Elementary School
- San Isidro Elementary School
- San Nicolas Primary School
- San Roque-Tastasan Elementary School
- Sto. Niño Catholic School
- Supang Central School
- Taminla Elementary School
- Tinadtaran Elementary School
- Triumph Baptist Christian Academy
- Umilig Primary School
- Zaldivar Elementary School

Secondary schools

- Agsanayan National High School
- Buenavista National High School
- East Valencia National High School
- Getulio National High School
- Philippine College of Business and Accountancy
- Supang National High School

Higher educational institution

- Guimaras State University (Main)
