= Guimaras State University =

Public university in Guimaras, Philippines

- Former names: Buenavista Vocational School (1964–1995); Guimaras Polytechnic College (1995–2001); Guimaras State College (2001–2019)
- Type: Public/State Nonsectarian Coeducational higher education institution
- Established: 1964; 62 years ago
- Academic affiliations: Accrediting Agency for Chartered Colleges and Universities in the Philippines
- Chairman: Dr. J. Prospero de Vera III
- President: Dr. Lilian Diana B. Parreño
- Vice-president: Dr. Erly M. Martir (VP for Academic Affairs); Dr. Julius T. Vergara (VP for Research, Extension, Training & Innovation); Janet R. Aleman (VP for Administration & Finance)
- Dean: List: Dr. Erly M. Martir (Graduate School); Dr. Bernardo G. Cagasan (Arts & Sciences); Dr. Adrian J. Forca (Science & Technology); Dr. Jasmin T. Gadian (Teacher Education); Engr. Conrado S. Calumpita (Engineering & Industrial Technology); Dr. Rome B. Moralista (Business & Management); Dr. Rhea Joy D. Flora (Agriculture Sciences); Dr. Jasmin L. Parreño (Criminal Justice Education)
- Location: Buenavista, Guimaras, 5044, Philippines; 10°41′57″N 122°39′04″E
- Campus: Main: Salvador Campus 5 hectares (50,000 m^{2}) External: Mosqueda Campus and Baterna Campus
- Colors
- Website: www.gsu.edu.ph
- Location in the Visayas Location in the Philippines

Guimaras State University (GSU) is a public university in the island province of Guimaras, Philippines. It is mandated to provide advance education, higher technological, professional instruction and training in the fields of education, technology, agriculture, fisheries, engineering, arts and sciences, forestry, business administration, hotel and restaurant management, tourism, health sciences, computer technology, criminology, maritime and aviation education, and other related fields of study. It consists of three campuses: the Salvador Campus, Mosqueda Campus, and Baterna Campus.

== History ==
The Buenavista Vocational School, around which the Guimaras State University eventually grew, was founded under the provision of Republic Act 3933 in 1964 with Representative Rodolfo Tiamson Ganzon of the Second District of Iloilo as the leading sponsor of the bill.

The hard work of many local officials starting with Hon. Tomas Junco, who backed a resolution to persuade the legislature to establish a vocational school in Buenavista, led up to the creation of BVS when RA 3933 was passed on June 18, 1964. Representative Fermin “Nene” Zarandin Caram of the Lone District of Iloilo City made an effort for the implementation of the law. Four years later, through the efforts of lawyer Ernesto G. Gaduyon and Iloilo governor Abelardo D. Javellana, the philanthropist-lawyer Juan Z. Salvador, Jr. bestowed a 12.36-acre lot taken away from his lands in Barangay McLain, Buenavista, Guimaras, to be the school site. This significant bequest led the school to honor him by taking his name to refer to the main University grounds.

In 1980, the school was approved of offering post-secondary courses. The two-year trade technical and technology courses opened the door to the offering of higher education courses, which are either terminal or ladderized (a new system of education in the Philippines that allows learners to progress between Technical Vocational Education and Training (TVET) and college, and vice versa). In 1992, the year Guimaras was proclaimed as a regular and full-fledged province, the Sangguniang Bayan (municipal council) of Buenavista passed a resolution requesting Representative Alberto “Albertito” Javellana Lopez of the Second District of Iloilo to put his back for the conversion of BVS to Guimaras Polytechnic College.

In July 1994, Representative Lopez filed House Bill 6252, in Congress, seeking the conversion of the BVS into a polytechnic college. On March 3, 1995, President Fidel V. Ramos signed Republic Act 7944 into law, showing out the conversion of Buenavista Vocational School into Guimaras Polytechnic College, which would offer general secondary curriculum, professional, technological courses.

In June 2000, a consultation and public hearing on House Bills 7382 and 5807 sponsored by Representative Emily Relucio-Lopez of the Lone District of Guimaras was organized at the GPC Function Room. With 179 listed participants from public and private sectors in attendance, all sectoral representatives expressed full support for the conversion of GPC, Buenavista and Western Visayas College of Science and Technology (WVCST)–Guimaras Extension in the Municipality of Jordan, into a state college.

Then, in the first regular session of the Eleventh Congress, Representative Dante Ventura Liban and Representative Emily Relucio-Lopez filed House Bill 12358 (in substitution for House Bills 5807 & 7382). On June 8, 2001, President Gloria Macapagal-Arroyo signed Republic Act 9138 into law. The law established the Guimaras State College, merging the Guimaras Polytechnic College in the Municipality of Buenavista and the Western Visayas College of Science and Technology–Guimaras Extension in the Municipality of Jordan. The GSC in Buenavista was the main college grounds of the college and referred to as GSC Salvador while the one in Jordan was referred to as GSC Mosqueda Annex; [and the one in San Lorenzo was referred to as GSC Baterna Annex—an expansion during Dr. Rogelio T. Artajo's presidency].

GSU has had a mandate, from its very inception, to offer undergraduate and graduate courses in technology education, agriculture, fisheries, engineering, arts and sciences, forestry, business, health, computer, criminology, nautical and short-term vocational-technical and other continuing courses that may be found to be needed and relevant. It has promoted research, advanced studies, extension work and progressive leadership in each area of specialization ever since its beginning. Too, it has provided primary consideration through the integration of research/studies for the development of the Province of Guimaras.

For the next five decades, a principal, five administrators, an acting administrator, and an SUC president would take the helm and lead the school to its current level of excellence: Jose E. Esquera, Florencio D. Doromal, Cerilo P. Tamayo, Arthur Clemente, Mercedes R. Regalado, Teodoro B. Alenton, Hector G. Zamora, and Dr. Sofronio D. Dignomo.

Over 50 years later after its founding, the Philippine Congress approved GSC's conversion to University status by way of RA 11335, and President Rodrigo Roa Duterte signed it into law on April 26, 2019.

Today, having been the first state college in the whole Philippines to be Institutionally Accredited (IA) by Accrediting Agency for Chartered Colleges and Universities in the Philippines, the Guimaras State University awards 58 bachelor's, 8 master's, and 4 doctorate degrees.

Having been the first state college in the whole Philippines to be included in the group of 11 state universities and college by Commission on Higher Education (CHED) for its Internationalization Network Program, the university is positioned in research, teaching, and public engagement on the island, in the West Visayas, and beyond.

== External Campuses ==
The Guimaras State University has two external campuses: Mosqueda Campus in Alaguisoc, Jordan, Guimaras and the Baterna Campus in Constancia, San Lorenzo, Guimaras.

Mosqueda Campus was created by virtue of Republic Act 9138, the Western Visayas College of Science and Technology (WVCST) - Guimaras Extension Campus in Alaguisoc, Jordan was officially turned over to the Guimaras State College during the celebration of the annual Manggahan Festival in May 2002.

The Mosqueda Campus has 2 colleges:

- College of Science and Technology (CST) which offers:
  - Bachelor of Science in Information Technology
  - Bachelor of Science in Computer Science
  - Bachelor of Science in Information System
  - Bachelor of Science in Entertainment and Multimedia Computing
  - Bachelor of Library and Information Science
- College of Business and Management (CBM) which offers:
  - Bachelor of Science in Business Administration
  - Bachelor of Science in Real Estate Management
  - Bachelor of Science in Entrepreneurship

The Baterna Campus has 1 college:

- College of Agricultural Sciences (CAgS) which offers:
  - Bachelor of Science in Agriculture
  - Bachelor of Science in Fisheries
  - Bachelor of Science in Food Technology

== Location ==
Guimaras State University is situated in the island province of Guimaras in the Philippines. The university operates across three campuses, each located in a different municipality of the province.

The main campus, known as the Salvador Campus, is located in McLain, Buenavista—the most populous municipality of Guimaras—and occupies an area of 5 hectares. The Mosqueda Campus is situated in Alaguisoc, Jordan, also covering 5 hectares. Meanwhile, the Baterna Campus is located in Constancia, San Lorenzo, with a land area of 2 hectares.

== Curricular Offerings ==
The university offers degree programs which are relevant to the development needs of several sectors.

1. College of Teacher Education
•Bachelor of Elementary Education major in General Education
•Bachelor of Secondary Education
majors in English, Filipino, Mathematics, and Social Studies
•Diploma in Teaching
•Bachelor of Technology and Livelihood Education Major in Home Economics and Livelihood Education

2. College of Arts & Sciences
•Bachelor of Arts in English Language Studies
•Bachelor of Public Administration

3. College of Business Administration
•Bachelor of Science in Business Administration
major in Financial Management,
major in Marketing Management
major in Human Resource Management
•Bachelor of Science in Hospitality Management
•Bachelor of Science in Entrepreneurship
•Bachelor of Science in Real Estate Management

4. College of Science and Technology
•Bachelor of Science in Computer Science
•Bachelor of Science in Information Technology
•Bachelor of Science in Food Technology
•Bachelor of Science in Information System

5. College of Engineering and Industrial Technology
•Bachelor of Industrial Technology
•Bachelor of Science in Mechanical Engineering
•Bachelor of Science in Electrical Engineering

6. College of Criminal Justice Education
•Bachelor of Science in Criminology

7. College of Agriculture and Fisheries (Baterna Campus)
•Bachelor of Science in Agriculture
•Bachelor of Science in Fisheries

8. Graduate School
•Doctor of Philosophy (Ph.D.) major in Educational Management
•Doctor of Education (Ed.D.) major in Curriculum Instruction
•Doctor in Management (D.M.)
major in Business Administration
major in Human Resource Management

•Master in Education (M.Ed.) major in Educational Management
•Master of Art in Teaching Mathematics (M.A.T.)
•Master in Public Administration (MPA)
•Master in Business Administration (MBA)
