= San Lorenzo, Guimaras =

Municipality in Guimaras, Philippines

San Lorenzo
- Municipality
- Municipality of San Lorenzo
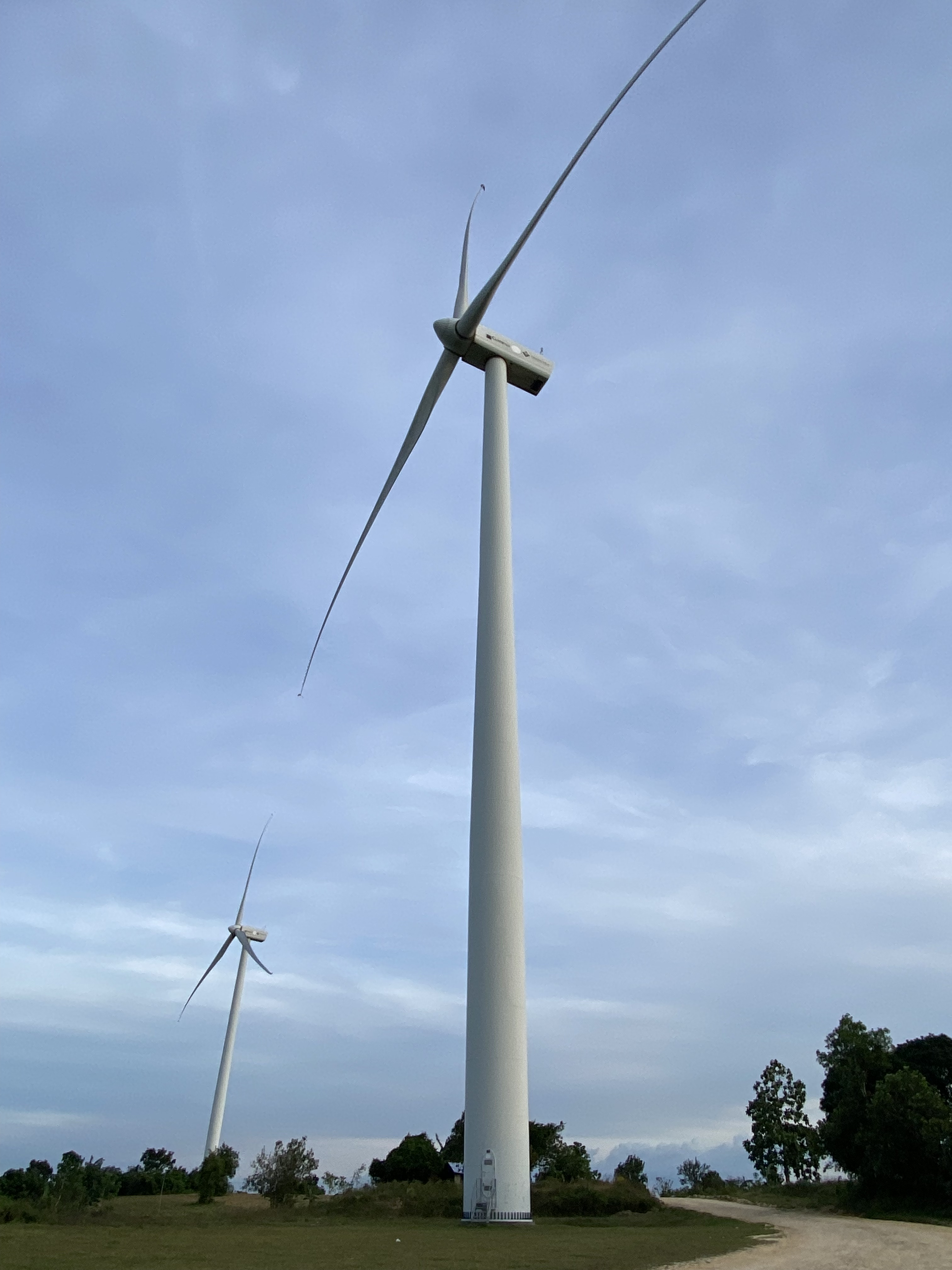
- San Lorenzo Wind Farm

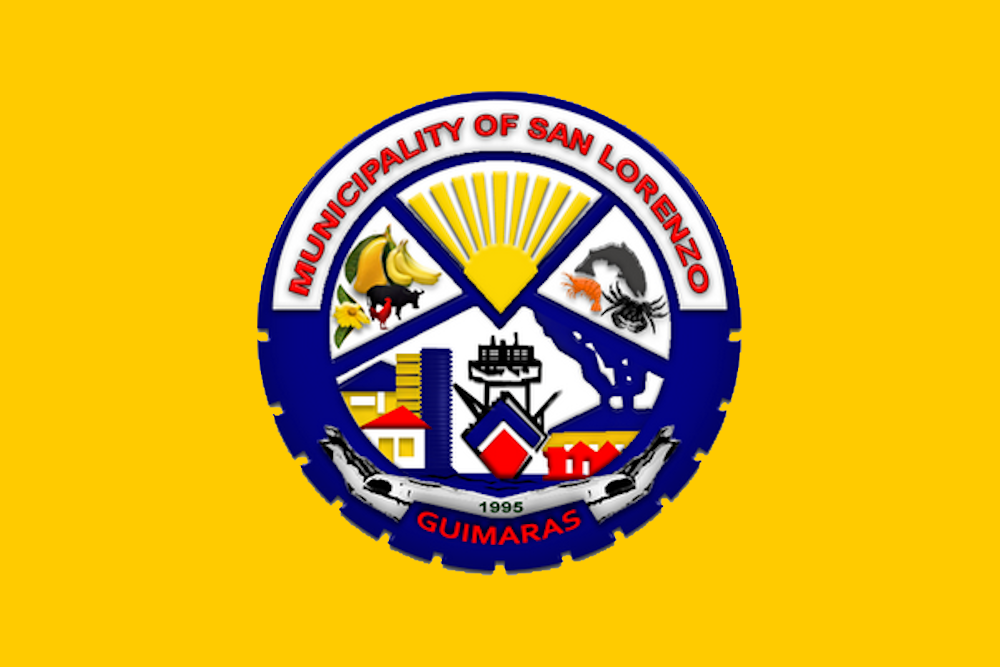
- Flag
- Interactive map of San Lorenzo
- Location within the Philippines
- Coordinates: 10°35′17″N 122°42′07″E
- Country: Philippines
- Region: Western Visayas
- Province: Guimaras
- District: Lone district
- Founded: May 8, 1995
- Named for: Saint Lorenzo Ruiz of Manila
- Barangays: 12 (see Barangays)

Government
  - Type: Sangguniang Bayan
  - Mayor: Jimmy O. Gajo (NUP)
  - Vice Mayor: Constantino T. Cordero, Jr. (NUP)
  - Representative: JC Rahman Nava (NUP)
  - Municipal Council: Members: Ma. Juliet Tamayor-Romero; Ercedita M. Espago; Jose Rolly T. Ramos; Romulo A. Galfo; John G. Garganera; Alex S. Garganera; Jimmy G. Gallego; Lino R. Galea
  - Electorate: 18,931 voters (2025)

Area
  - Total: 93.04 km^{2} (35.92 sq mi)
- Elevation: 30 m (98 ft)
- Highest elevation: 202 m (663 ft)
- Lowest elevation: 0 m (0 ft)

Population (2024 census)
  - Total: 30,266
  - Density: 325.3/km^{2} (842.5/sq mi)
  - Households: 7,130

Economy
  - Income class: 3rd municipal income class
  - Poverty incidence: 9.84% (2023)
  - Revenue: ₱ 169.2 million (2024)
  - Assets: ₱ 411.1 million (2024)
  - Expenditure: ₱ 79.85 million (2024)
  - Liabilities: ₱ 79.49 million (2024)

Service provider
  - Electricity: Guimaras Electric Cooperative (GUIMELCO)
- Time zone: UTC+8 (PST)
- ZIP code: 5047
- PSGC: 0607904000
- IDD : area code: +63 (0)33
- Native languages: Hiligaynon; Tagalog
- Website: sanlorenzoguimaras.gov.ph

San Lorenzo, officially the Municipality of San Lorenzo (Hiligaynon: Banwa sang San Lorenzo; Tagalog: Bayan ng San Lorenzo), is a municipality in the province of Guimaras, Philippines. According to the 2024 census, it has a population of 30,266 people.

== History ==
San Lorenzo was created by virtue of Republic Act No. 7897 out of Jordan, Guimaras on February 20, 1995. It is known for its wind farms. In addition, San Lorenzo celebrates Foundation Day for its creation every February.

== Geography ==
San Lorenzo is a part of the Metro Iloilo–Guimaras area, centered on Iloilo City. It is 21 kilometres (13 mi) from Jordan.

=== Barangays ===
San Lorenzo is politically subdivided into 12 barangays. Each barangay consists of puroks and some have sitios.

- Aguilar
- Cabano (Poblacion)
- Cabungahan
- Constancia
- Gaban
- Igcawayan
- M. Chavez
- San Enrique (Lebas)
- Sapal
- Sebario
- Suclaran
- Tamborong

=== Climate ===
Climate data for San Lorenzo, Guimaras
Month	Jan	Feb	Mar	Apr	May	Jun	Jul	Aug	Sep	Oct	Nov	Dec	Year
Mean daily maximum °C (°F)	30 (86)	31 (88)	32 (90)	33 (91)	32 (90)	30 (86)	29 (84)	29 (84)	28 (82)	29 (84)	30 (86)	30 (86)	30 (86)
Mean daily minimum °C (°F)	21 (70)	21 (70)	22 (72)	23 (73)	24 (75)	24 (75)	24 (75)	24 (75)	24 (75)	24 (75)	23 (73)	22 (72)	23 (73)
Average precipitation mm (inches)	19 (0.7)	17 (0.7)	26 (1.0)	37 (1.5)	119 (4.7)	191 (7.5)	258 (10.2)	260 (10.2)	248 (9.8)	196 (7.7)	97 (3.8)	39 (1.5)	1,507 (59.3)
Average rainy days	7.2	5.2	8.3	11.9	22.3	26.5	28.3	28.2	27.3	26.4	18.7	11.8	222.1
Source: Meteoblue

== Demographics ==
Population census of San Lorenzo
Year	Pop.	±% p.a.
1995	18,537	—
2000	20,168	+1.82%
2007	22,319	+1.41%
2010	24,032	+2.73%
2015	26,112	+1.59%
2020	29,444	+2.56%
2024	30,266	+0.66%
Source: Philippine Statistics Authority

In the 2024 census, the population of San Lorenzo was 30,266 people, with a density of 330 inhabitants per square kilometre or 850 inhabitants per square mile.

== Economy ==
Poverty incidence of San Lorenzo (%)

Source: Philippine Statistics Authority

== Education ==
The San Lorenzo (Buenavista III) Schools District Office governs all educational institutions within the municipality. It oversees the management and operations of all private and public, from primary to secondary schools.

Primary and elementary schools

- Aguilar Elementary School
- Cabungahan Elementary School
- Calvary Baptist Christian Academy
- Claire Marie Parker Christian Academy
- Constancia Elementary School
- Doña Lucia C. Locsin Memorial School
- Fiscal Jose M. Zambarrano, Sr. Memorial School
- M. Chavez Elementary School
- Miagos Primary School
- San Enrique Elementary School
- Sapal Elementary School
- Sebario Elementary School
- Silvestra Galarpe Melgar Memorial School
- Suclaran Central School
- Tangaw Primary School

Secondary schools

- Dr. Catalino Gallego Nava Memorial High School
- Remedios E. Vilches-San Lorenzo National High School
