= Unisan Island =

Island in the Philippines

- Location within Philippines

Geography
- Coordinates: 10°20′2″N 122°35′17″E
- Adjacent to: Guimaras Strait; Panay Gulf

Administration
- Philippines
- Region: Western Visayas
- Province: Guimaras
- Municipality: Nueva Valencia

Unisan Island is a small island located in southernmost part of Nueva Valencia, Guimaras and beside Malingin Island in the Philippines. It is the largest island in the Unisan Islets.

== Guimaras Oil Spill ==
In August 2006, the Guimaras oil spill occurred. The 988-ton M/T Solar 1, chartered by Petron (the Philippines’ largest oil refinery), was carrying 2.41 million litres of bunker fuel sank 17 kilometres (11 mi) off the island's southern coast, contaminating 24 square kilometres (9.3 sq mi). The Philippine Coast Guard called this the worst oil spill in the country's history. According to officials, 1,000 hectares (2,500 acres) of mangroves were affected, including parts of the Taklong Island National Marine Reserve.

== See also ==
- List of islands of the Philippines
