= Malingin Island =

Islet in Guimaras, Philippines

- Location within Visayas, Philippines Location within Philippines

Geography
- Coordinates: 10°19′50″N 122°35′57″E
- Adjacent to: Guimaras Strait; Panay Gulf

Administration
- Philippines
- Region: Western Visayas
- Province: Guimaras

Malingin Island is a small island located in southernmost part of Nueva Valencia, Guimaras in the Philippines, situated beside Unisan Island.

== Guimaras Oil Spill ==
In August 2006, the Guimaras oil spill occurred. The 998-ton M/T Solar 1, chartered by Petron (the Philippines’ largest oil refiner), was carrying 2.4 million litres of bunker fuel sank 17 kilometres (11 mi) off the island's southern coast, contaminating 24 km^{2}. The Philippine Coast Guard called this the worst oil spill in the country's history. According to officials, 1,000 hectares (2,500 acres) of mangroves were affected, including parts of the Taklong Island National Marine Reserve.

== See also ==
- List of islands of the Philippines
