= Guiuanon Island =

Island in the Philippines

- Location within Philippines

Geography
- Coordinates: 10°23′30″N 122°36′34″E
- Adjacent to: Guimaras Strait; Panay Gulf

Administration
- Philippines
- Region: Western Visayas
- Province: Guimaras

Guiuanon Island (or Guiwanon Island) is an island barangay located beside Panubulon Island southeast of Nueva Valencia, Guimaras in the Philippines. The island was affected by an oil spill on August 11, 2006.

== See also ==
- List of islands of the Philippines
