= Panubulon Island =

Island in the Philippines

- Location within Philippines

Geography
- Coordinates: 10°24′20″N 122°34′39″E
- Adjacent to: Guimaras Strait; Panay Gulf

Administration
- Philippines
- Region: Western Visayas
- Province: Guimaras
- Municipality: Nueva Valencia

Panubulon Island (or Panobolon Island) is an island barangay located southeast of Nueva Valencia, Guimaras in the Philippines. Beside Panubulon is Guiuanon Island. This island was affected by an oil spill last August 11, 2006.

== See also ==
- List of islands of the Philippines
