= Yeto Island =

Island in the Philippines

- Interactive map of Yeto Island
- Other names: Yato Island, Isla ni Yeto

Geography
- Location: Panay Gulf, Visayan Sea
- Archipelago: Guimaras

Administration
- Philippines
- Province: Guimaras
- Municipality: Nueva Valencia

Yeto Island or Yato Island is a tropical island in the Panay Gulf of the Visayan Sea. It lies between Cabalagnan and Panubolon Island, located in the southern portion of the province of Guimaras, Philippines.

== Background ==
The island was named after Lieutenant Pedro Brancia Yeto (March 3, 1917 - March 1, 2004). Yeto was assigned to the U.S. Signal Corps during World War II, and he set up a wireless radio relay station on the island. It served the purpose of relaying messages to American submarines nearby for rescuing downed American pilots. During this time, the natives began to call it "isla ni Yeto," referring to the place used by soldiers under Yeto's command as they fought against Japanese invaders at that time.

After the war, Yeto studied to become a marine engineer in the Philippines. He later worked as a board examiner for engine officers in the Professional Regulation Commission.

The island was labeled in the United States Army Map Service in 1954. Further research about Spanish Era maps came up with no name for the island during the Spanish colonization of the Philippines.

== See also ==
- United States Army Forces in the Far East (USAFFE)
- Philippines campaign (1941–1942)
