= Ave Maria Island =

Island in Guimaras, Philippines

- Location within Philippines

Geography
- Coordinates: 10°32′45″N 122°31′5″E
- Adjacent to: Panay Gulf

Administration
- Philippines
- Region: Western Visayas
- Province: Guimaras
- Municipality: Jordan
- Barangay: Lawi

Ave Maria Island is an island located in Brgy. Lawi, Jordan, Guimaras in the Philippines. The island can be seen from Alubihod Beach resort in Nueva Valencia, Guimaras.

== See also ==
- List of islands of the Philippines
