= Sibunag =

Municipality in Guimaras, Philippines

- Municipality
- Municipality of Sibunag
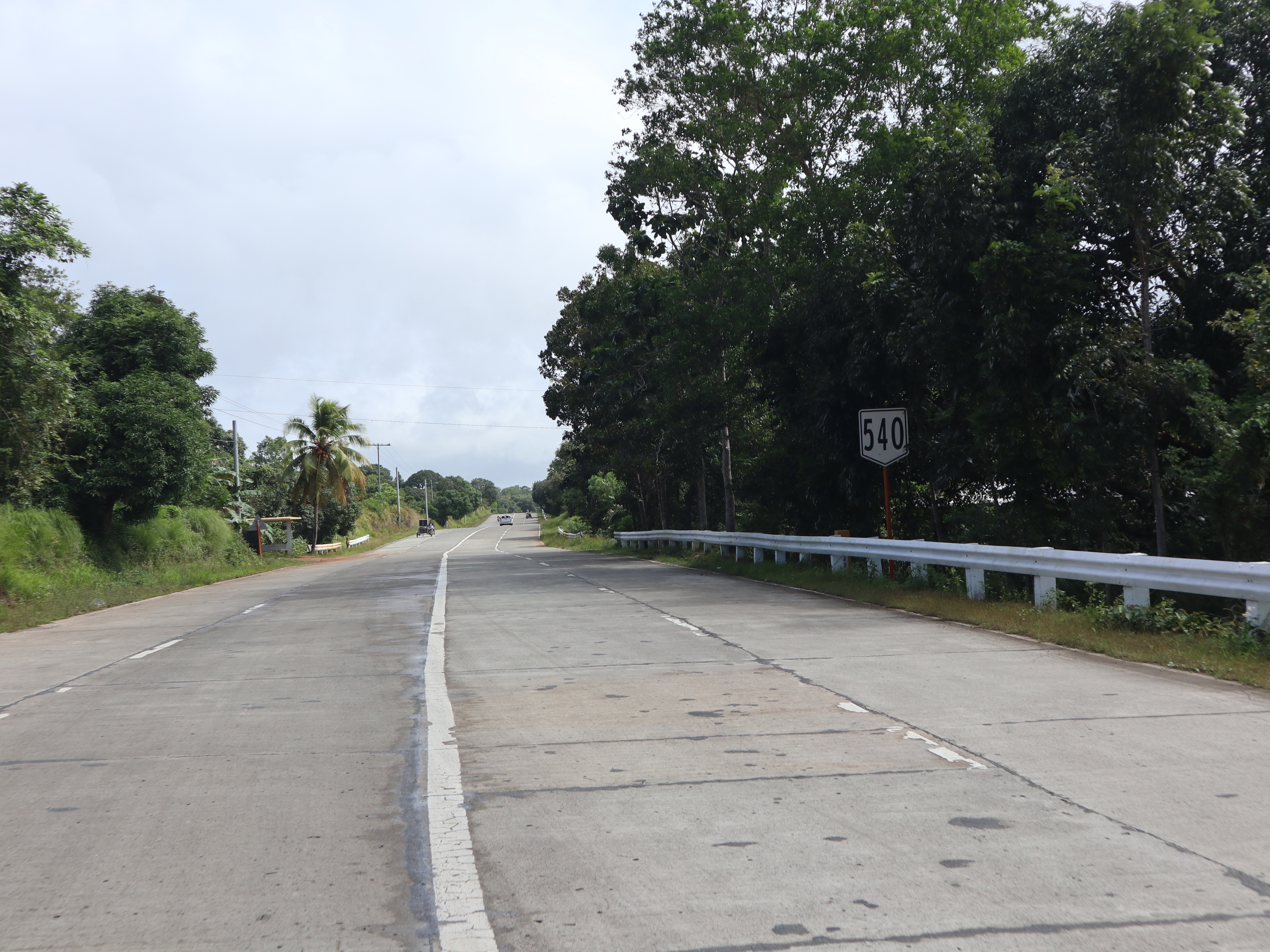
- Guimaras Circumferential Road

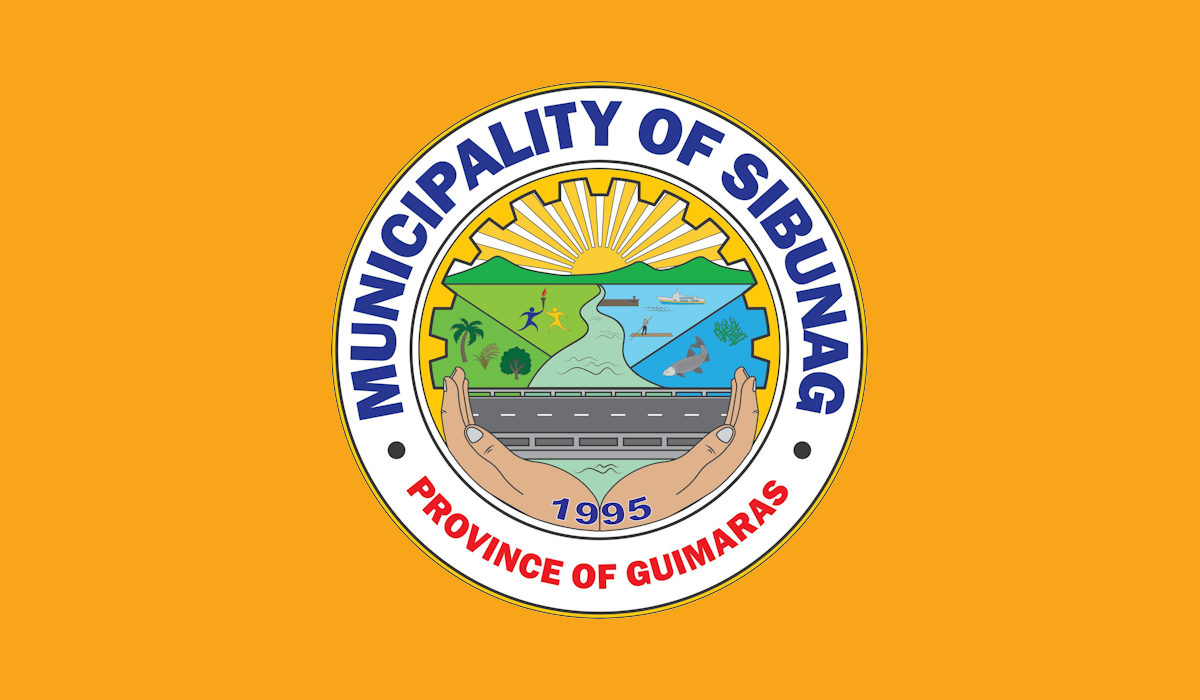
- Flag

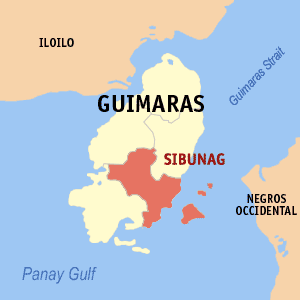
- Map of Guimaras with Sibunag highlighted
- Interactive map of Sibunag
- Location within the Philippines
- Coordinates: 10°30′14″N 122°37′55″E
- Country: Philippines
- Region: Western Visayas
- Province: Guimaras
- District: Lone district
- Founded: May 8, 1995
- Barangays: 14 (see Barangays)

Government
  - Type: Sangguniang Bayan
  - Mayor: Luben G. Vilches (Ind)
  - Vice Mayor: Reynaldo G. Segovia (Ind)
  - Representative: JC Rahman Nava (NUP)
  - Municipal Council: Members: Luvynne Gale Vilches-Casco; Desiderio T. Gange; Mervin V. Infante; Renan B. Gallego; Jomel E. Galvez; Nilo M. Solis; Joel G. Maestral; Rolly F. Gamarcha
  - Electorate: 15,430 voters (2025)

Area
  - Total: 120.04 km^{2} (46.35 sq mi)
- Elevation: 65 m (213 ft)
- Highest elevation: 198 m (650 ft)
- Lowest elevation: 0 m (0 ft)

Population (2024 census)
  - Total: 23,787
  - Density: 198.16/km^{2} (513.23/sq mi)
  - Households: 5,787

Economy
  - Income class: 3rd municipal income class
  - Poverty incidence: 10.14% (2023)
  - Revenue: ₱ 140 million (2024)
  - Assets: ₱ 491.3 million (2024)
  - Expenditure: ₱ 56.76 million (2024)
  - Liabilities: ₱ 112.1 million (2024)

Service provider
  - Electricity: Guimaras Electric Cooperative (GUIMELCO)
- Time zone: UTC+8 (PST)
- ZIP code: 5048
- PSGC: 0607905000
- IDD : area code: +63 (0)33
- Native languages: Hiligaynon; Ati; Tagalog

Sibunag, officially the Municipality of Sibunag (Hiligaynon: Banwa sang Sibunag; Tagalog: Bayan ng Sibunag), is a municipality in the province of Guimaras, Philippines. According to the 2024 census, it has a population of 23,787 people.

== History ==
Sibunag was created by virtue of Republic Act No. 7896 on February 20, 1995.

== Geography ==
Sibunag is a part of the Metro Iloilo–Guimaras area, centered on Iloilo City. It is 52 kilometres (32 mi) from Jordan. Its territory includes the islands of Inampulugan, Natugna, and several other minor islets in the Guimaras Strait.

=== Barangays ===
Sibunag is administratively subdivided into 14 barangays. Each barangay consists of puroks and some have sitios.

- Alegria
- Ayangan
- Bubog
- Concordia
- Dasal (Poblacion)
- Inampulugan
- Maabay
- Millan
- Oracon
- Ravina
- Sabang
- San Isidro
- Sebaste
- Tanglad

=== Climate ===
Climate data for Sibunag, Guimaras
Month	Jan	Feb	Mar	Apr	May	Jun	Jul	Aug	Sep	Oct	Nov	Dec	Year
Mean daily maximum °C (°F)	30 (86)	31 (88)	32 (90)	33 (91)	32 (90)	30 (86)	29 (84)	29 (84)	28 (82)	29 (84)	30 (86)	30 (86)	30 (86)
Mean daily minimum °C (°F)	21 (70)	21 (70)	22 (72)	23 (73)	24 (75)	24 (75)	24 (75)	24 (75)	24 (75)	24 (75)	23 (73)	22 (72)	23 (73)
Average precipitation mm (inches)	19 (0.7)	17 (0.7)	26 (1.0)	37 (1.5)	119 (4.7)	191 (7.5)	258 (10.2)	260 (10.2)	248 (9.8)	196 (7.7)	97 (3.8)	39 (1.5)	1,507 (59.3)
Average rainy days	7.2	5.2	8.3	11.9	22.3	26.5	28.3	28.2	27.3	26.4	18.7	11.8	222.1
Source: Meteoblue

== Demographics ==
Population census of Sibunag
Year	Pop.	±% p.a.
1995	17,773	—
2000	20,104	+2.68%
2007	17,552	−1.85%
2010	19,565	+4.03%
2015	22,158	+2.40%
2020	23,162	+0.94%
2024	23,787	+0.64%
Source: Philippine Statistics Authority

At the 2024 census, the population of Sibunag was 23,787 people, with a density of 200 inhabitants per square kilometre or 520 inhabitants per square mile.

== Economy ==
Poverty incidence of Sibunag (%)

Source: Philippine Statistics Authority

== Education ==
The Sibunag (Jordan III) 115876 Schools District Office governs all educational institutions within the municipality. It oversees the management and operations of all private and public, from primary to secondary schools.

Primary and elementary schools

- Alegria Elementary School
- Ayangan Elementary School
- Casilan Elementary School
- Dasal Elementary School
- Liningwan Central School
- Millan Elementary School
- Notre Dame Academy
- Paaralan Buhay ng Ravina Sur
- Paaralan ng Buhay ng Atgang
- Paaralan ng Buhay ng Maabay
- Paaralan ng Buhay ng Naoway
- Sabang Elementary School
- San Isidro Elementary School
- Sebaste Bubog Elementary School
- Sebaste Fundacion Elementary School
- Tanglad Elementary School

Secondary schools

- Alegria National High School
- Ayangan National High School
- Desiderio C. Gange National High School
