= Our Lady of the Philippines Trappist Monastery =

Roman Catholic monastery in Guimaras, Philippines

Our Lady of the Philippines Abbey
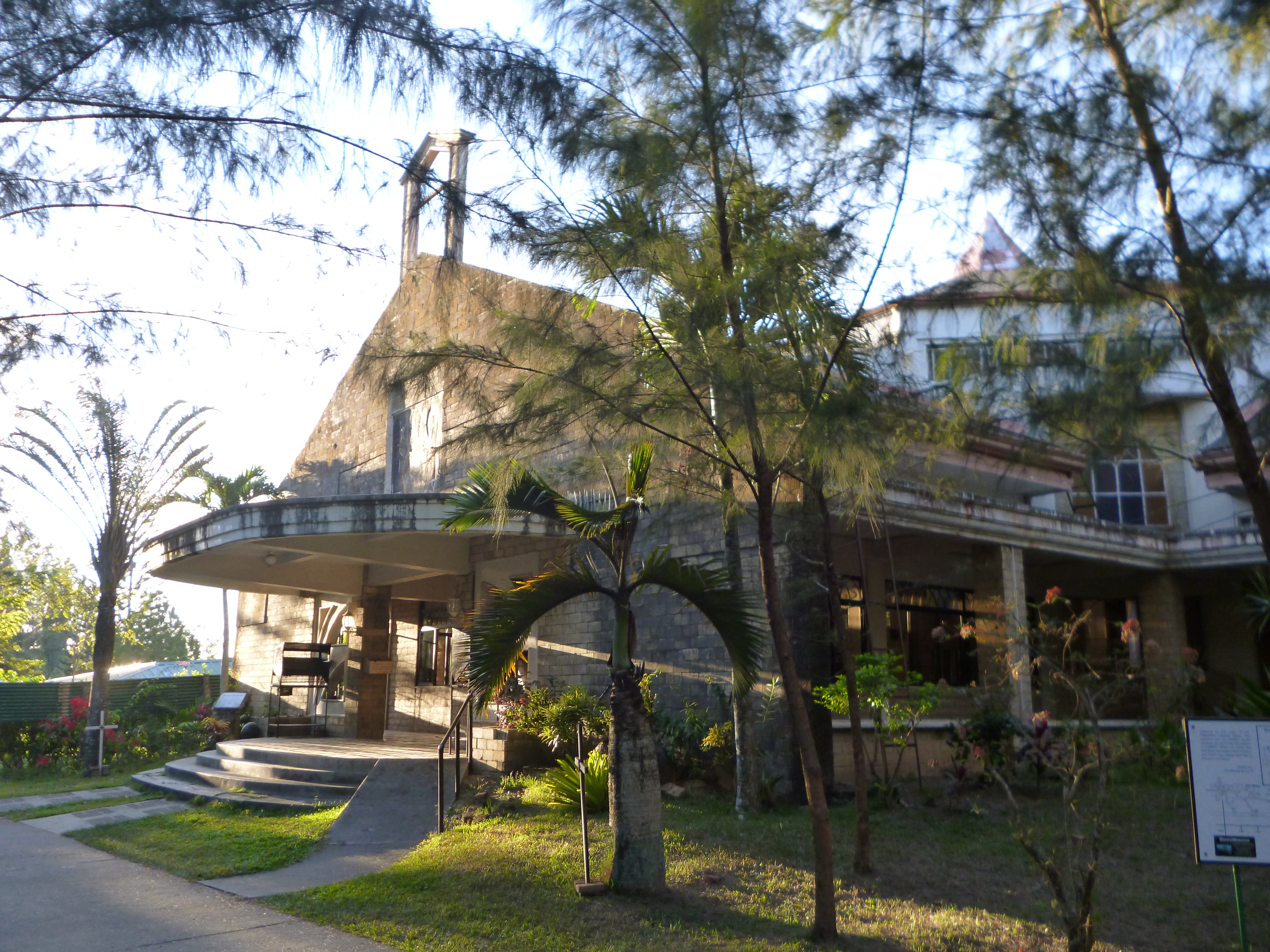
- Church at Trappist Monastery, Guimaras

- Location within Visayas Location within Philippines

Monastery information
- Full name: Our Lady of the Philippines Trappist Abbey
- Order: Cistercian Order (Trappist)
- Established: 1972
- Diocese: Archdiocese of Jaro

People
- Abbot: Dom Kevin Lipasan, OCSO
- Archbishop: Most Rev. Midyphil Billones, D.D.

Site
- Location: San Miguel, Jordan, Guimaras, Philippines
- Coordinates: 10°34′51″N 122°34′37″E
- Website: www.olpabbey.org

The Our Lady of the Philippines Abbey is a Catholic Trappist Abbey on Jordan, Guimaras, Philippines and is the one of the only two Trappist monasteries in the country. It was founded in 31 August 1972 by members of the US Region of Trappists. It became a priory on 20 May 1982 and was raised into abbey in 29 October 1990. They produce a number of products, selling under the brand Trappist Monastic Products, including pineapple and mango jams, which can be found in local stores and at their shop. The monastery is also available for retreats. It is a popular stop for tourists visiting Guimaras.

The current abbot is Dom Kevin Lipasan, OCSO.
