= Balaan bukid =

Mountain in Guimaras, Philippines

Bala-an bukid
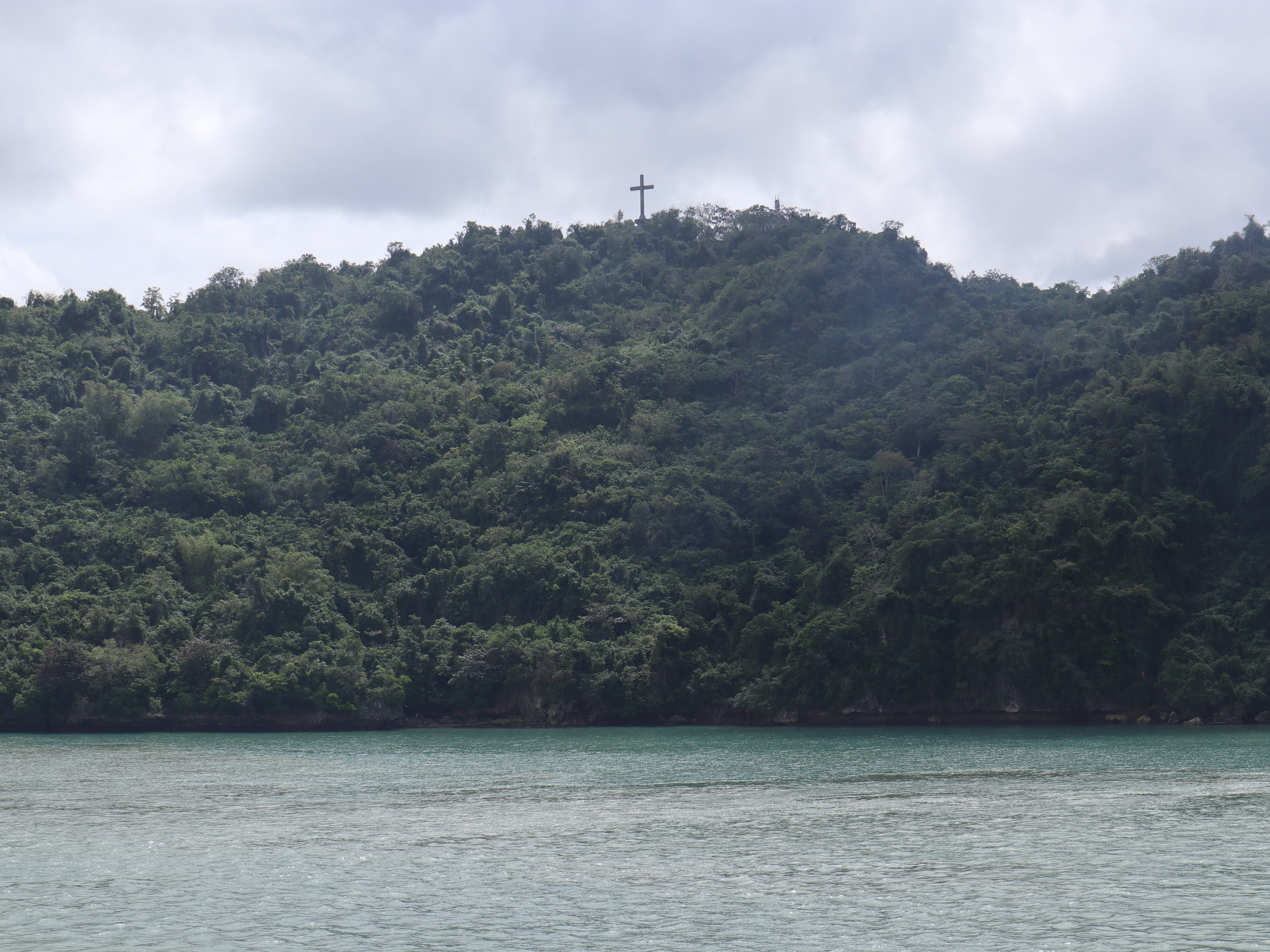
- Balaan bukid with a large cross on its summit

Highest point
- Elevation: 558 ft (170 m)
- Prominence: 310 ft (94 m)
- Coordinates: 10°39′48″N 122°33′59″E

Geography
- Country: Philippines
- Region: Western Visayas

Climbing
- Easiest route: Balcon Melliza trail

Balaan bukid (English: Holy mountain; Filipino: Banal na bundok) is a 558 feet (170 meters) mountain, located in Barangay Balcon Melliza, Jordan, Guimaras in the Philippines. This site has a church and a huge cross which can be seen from Iloilo City coast and known for being a pilgrimage site of Catholic devotees especially during the Holy Week.

It has also a lighthouse serve as a navigational aid for boats and ships. Alongside the trail to the top are 14 stations called "Way of the Cross", which depicts significant events in the life of Jesus Christ. Catholics visit Balaan Bukid to be reminded of the suffering Jesus gone through to save mankind.

== History ==
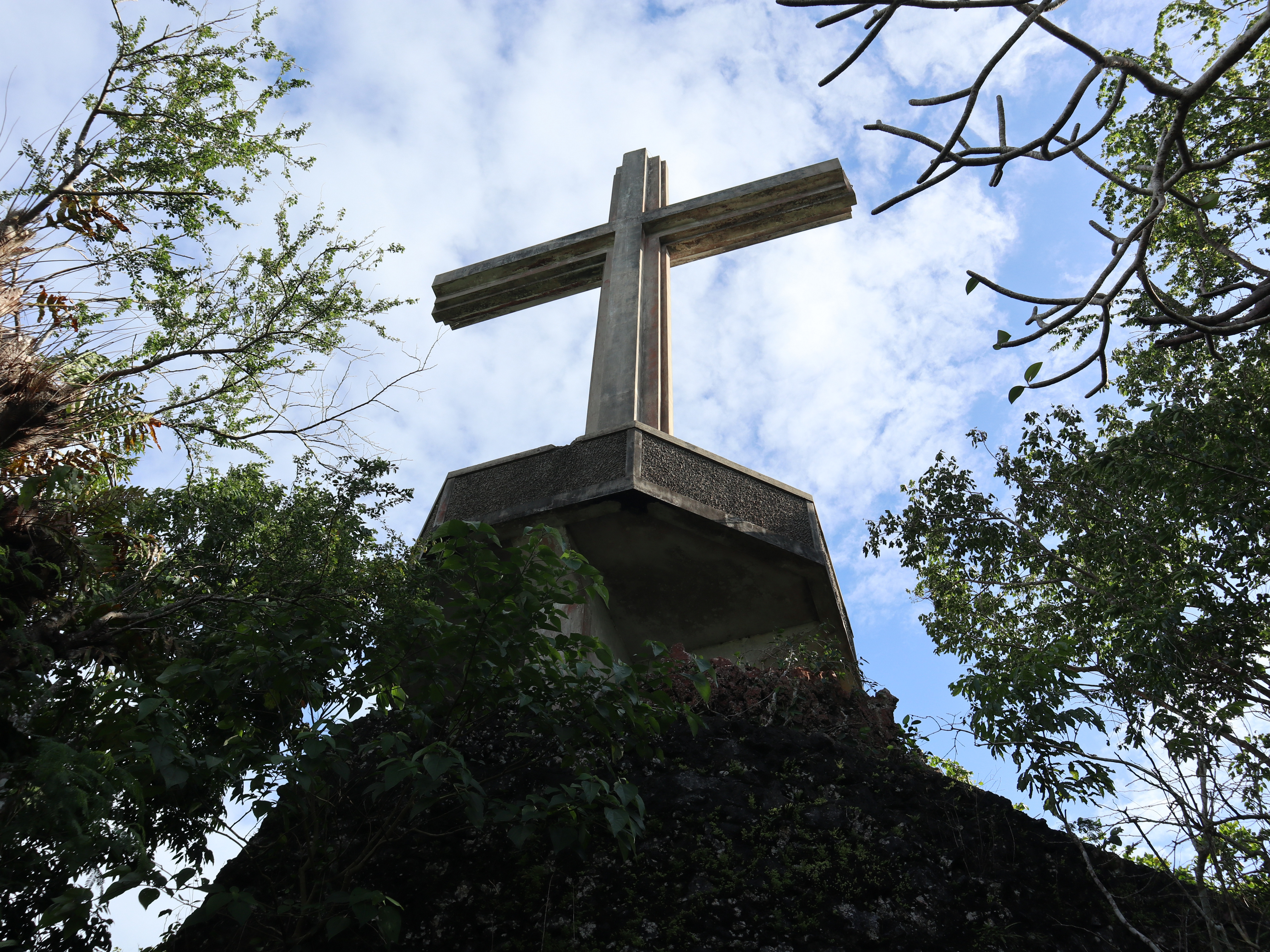
A large cross on the summit of the Balaan bukid

The Ave Maria Shrine in Jordan, Guimaras is popularly known as the Bala-an Bukid, the highest elevation of the headland called by navigators as the Bondolan Point. The shrine includes a chapel and a concrete cross both erected in 1954 during the Marian year celebration on a property donated by the heirs of Don Raymundo Melliza y Angulo, Iloilo's second governor.

The construction of the chapel and the cross was financed by Ana Ledesma vda de Lopez and her children Victoria, Eduardo and Cesar "in gratitude for Our Lady's protection during the last war."

The chapel overlooks the whole of Guimaras and the south eastern coast of Panay. Opposite it is a 60-foot cross erected on a narrow circular gallery that can accommodate about five persons at a time.

The shrine, completed in 1956, provides a panoramic view of Jordan and Buenavista, and of Iloilo City across the strait.

The Marian year celebration commemorated the 100th anniversary of the Catholic Church's pronouncement of the Virgin Mary's immaculate conception, a dogma proclaimed by Pope Pius IX on 8 December 1854.

The shrine was conceived by Mill Hill missionary Virgil Pixner, an Irish priest and chaplain of the Knights of Columbus Iloilo Council No. 3346.

Before leaving Panay for another assignment, he entrusted his plan to lawyer Jose Maria Lopez Vito who, along with then Jaro Archbishop Jose Maria Cuenco, looked for donors for the project.

Governor Melliza owned a lot of properties in Jordan, particularly in the northern part of Barrio Balcon which was later divided into Balcon Melliza and Balcon Maravilla where the Maravilla family owned most of the land in the south. Bala-an Bukid is in Balcon Melliza.

== Accessibility ==
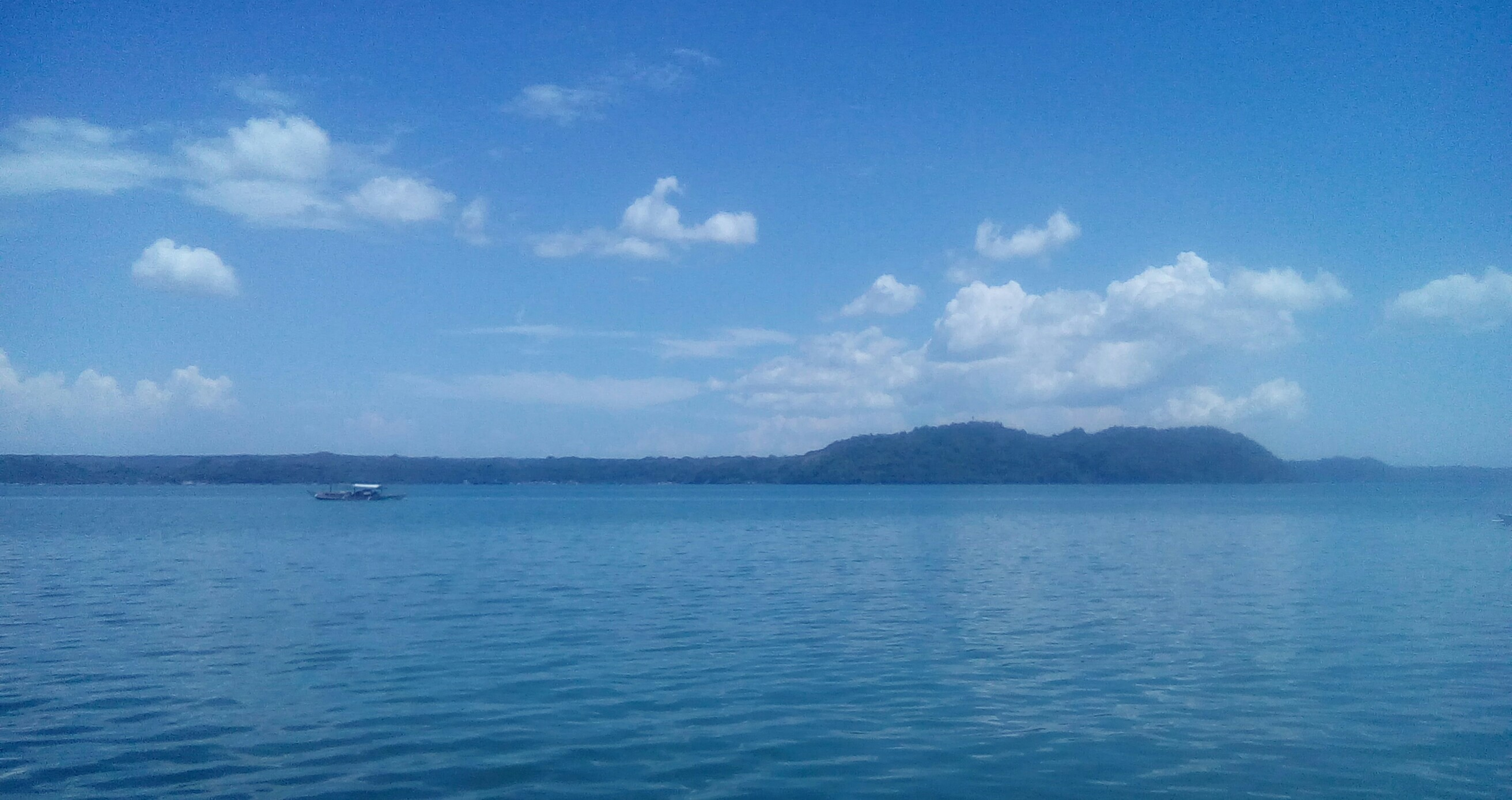
Balaan bukid, as seen from Iloilo City

On regular days, Balaan Bukid can be accessed by riding a ferry boat bound for Jordan Wharf in Parola Port in Iloilo City. From Jordan Wharf, take a tricycle ride to the foot of Balaan Bukid, where you will start your 30min – 45 min hike to the top. During the holy week, there are special trips that transport visitors directly to the foot of Balaan Bukid.
