= Taklong Island =

Island in the Philippines

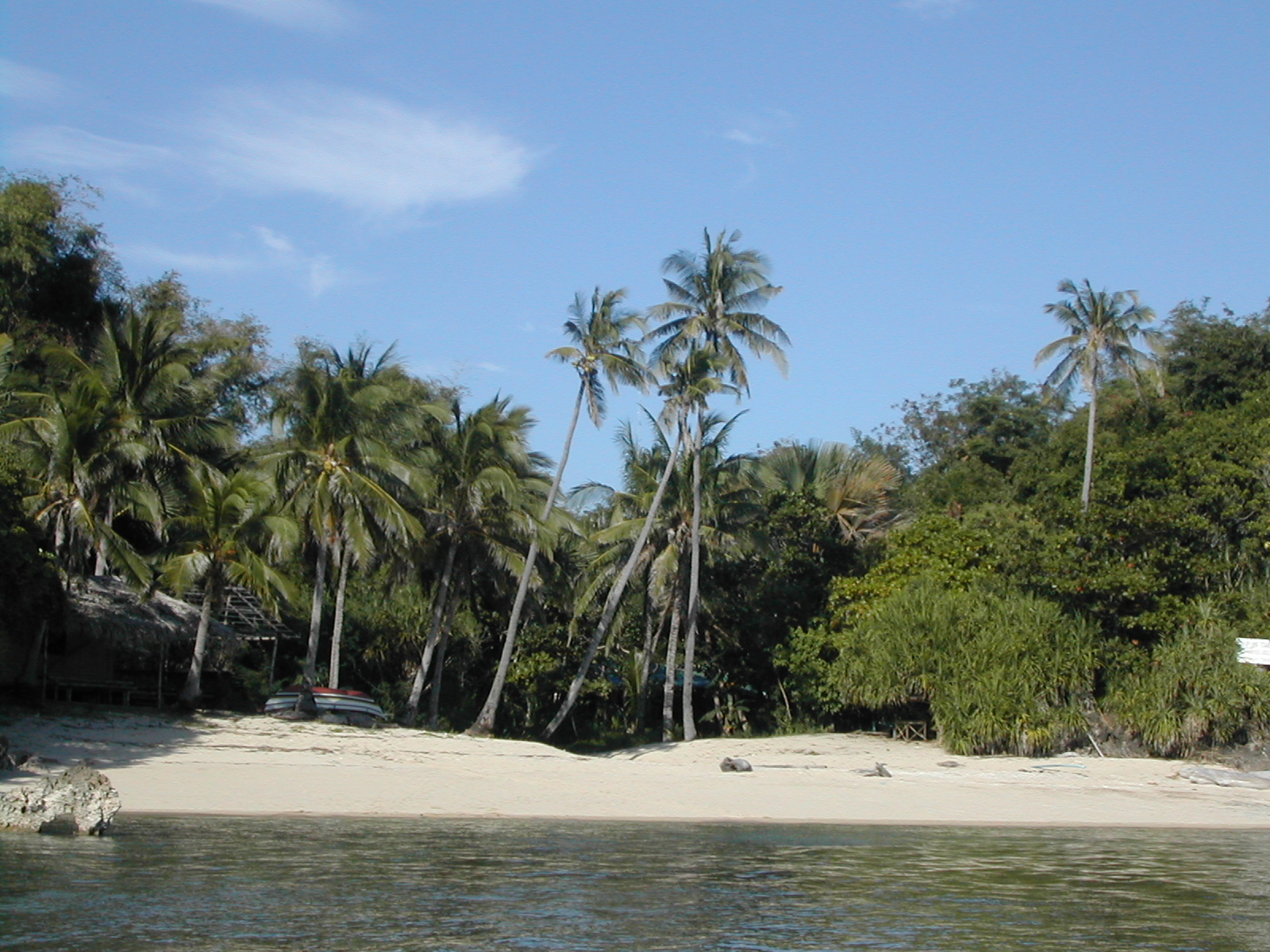
- Beach on Taklong Island

- Location within Philippines

Geography
- Coordinates: 10°24′16″N 122°30′43″E
- Adjacent to: Panay Gulf

Administration
- Philippines
- Region: Western Visayas
- Province: Guimaras
- Municipality: Nueva Valencia

Taklong Island is an island located in Nueva Valencia, Guimaras, off the southern end of the island of Guimaras, in the Western Visayas region of the Philippines. It is the main island of the Taklong and Tandog Group of Islands Natural Park, formerly known as the Taklong Island National Marine Reserve.

The island and nearby vicinity was declared as a national marine reserve by President Corazon Aquino in 1990. In 2025, Republic Act No. 12225 was signed by President Bongbong Marcos converting the marine reserve to a natural park.

A marine biological station run by the University of the Philippines Visayas (UPV) of nearby Iloilo Province is located on this island. The one-storey station established in 1977 and renovated twice (in 1987 and in 2008) sits on a 1.64 hectares parcel of land donated to UP in 1964, with Carlos P. Romulo as then University President. Donors included the family of the first lieutenant governor of then sub-province of Guimaras, the late Antonio Ortiz.

When proclaimed as a national marine reserve in Feb. 8, 1990 by then President Corazon C. Aquino, there was only one family residing in the island, the family of Vicente Basco, the only recognized tenured migrant when Taklong Island became part of the national marine reserve. Mr. Basco was employed by UPV as caretaker of its station in Taklong Island from the 1970s until his retirement. There are UPV staff, including security guards stationed in the island.

Takong Island was affected by the Guimaras Oil Spill of 2006 with 90% of its mangrove forest being coated with the oil sludge. Rehabilitation efforts in the area was started in 2007. It has fully recovered.

== Gallery ==
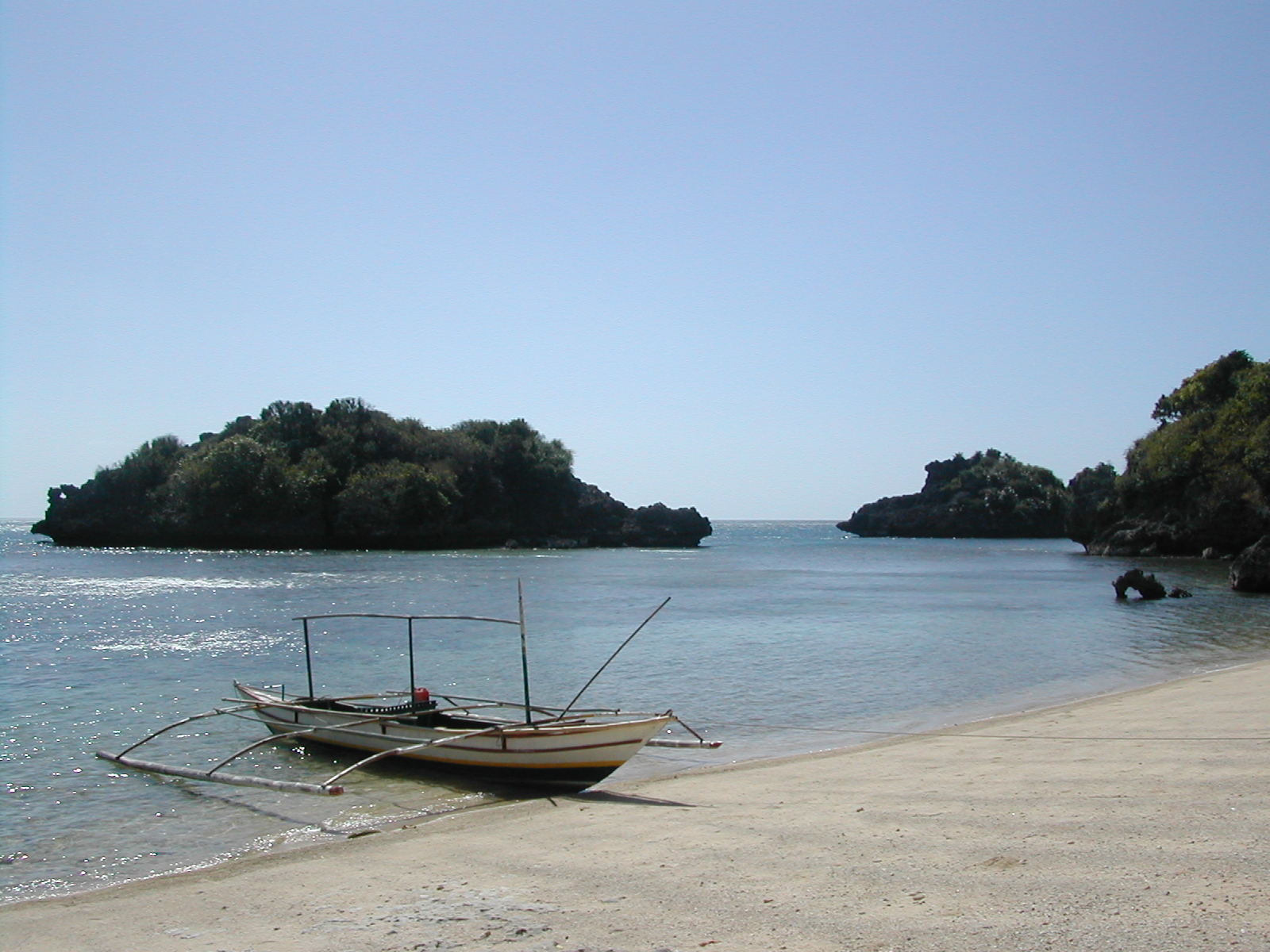
Beach on Taklong Island with pump boat and rock outcropping

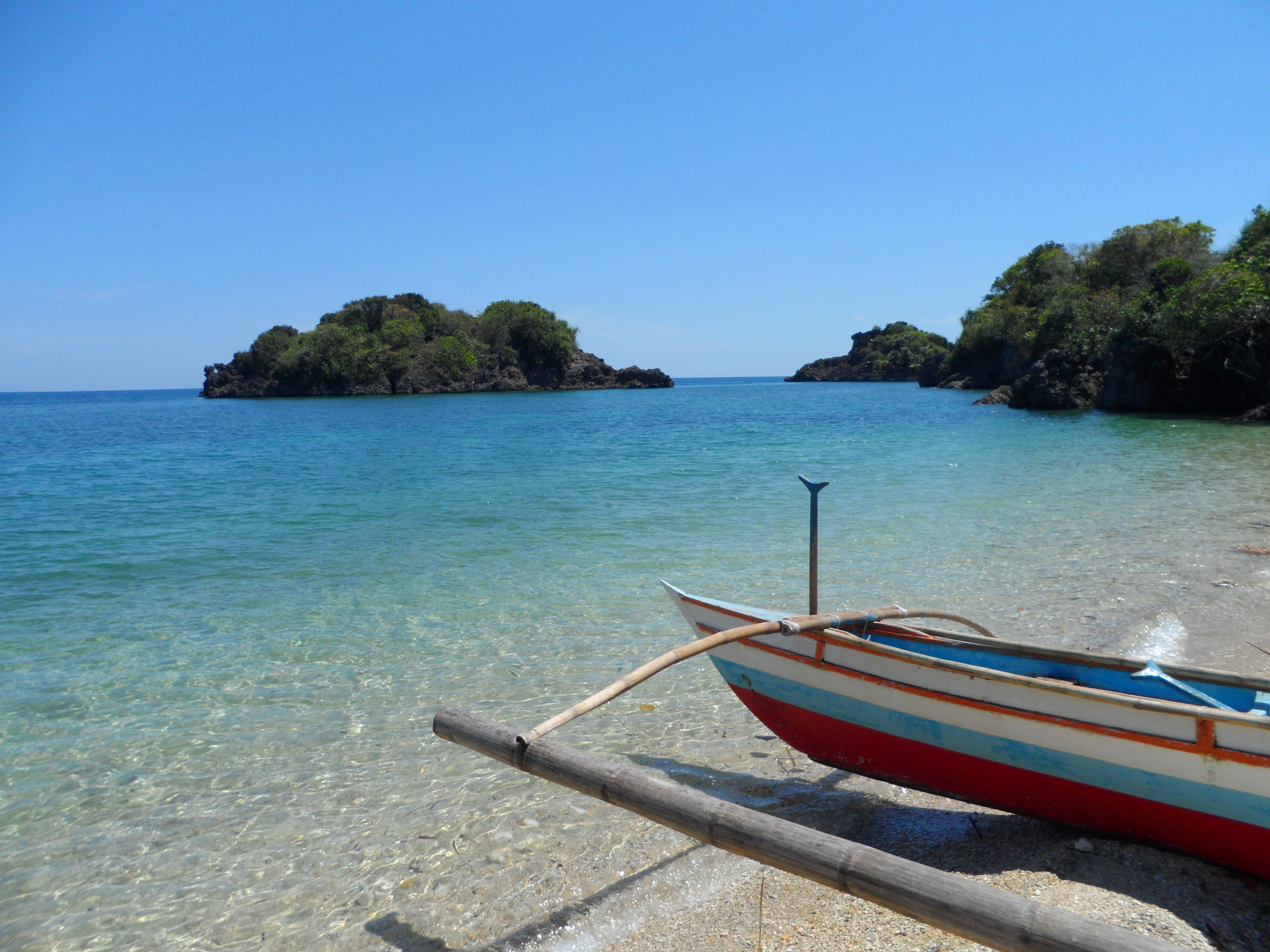
View from the front beach

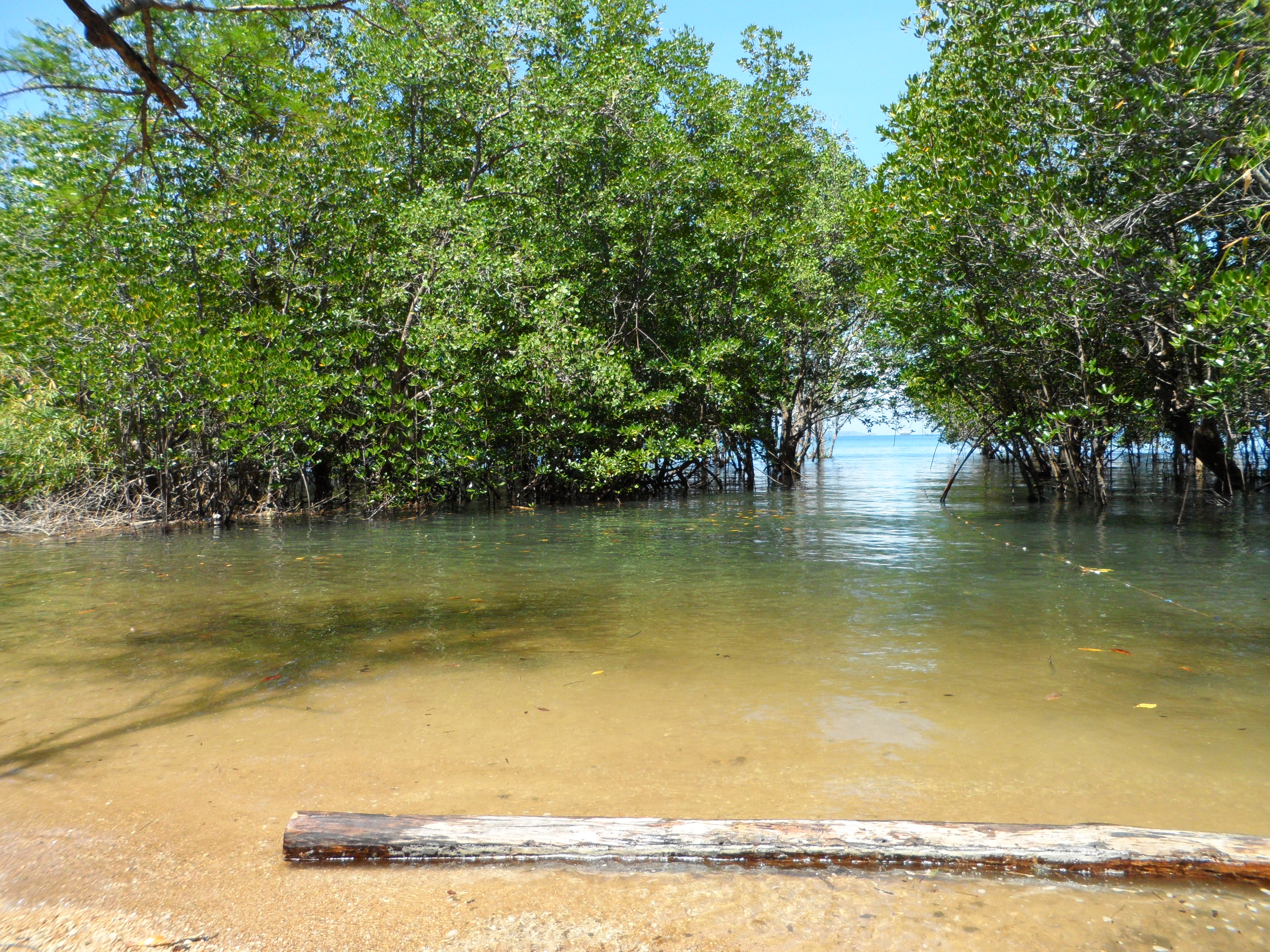
The dock through the mangroves at the back of the island. This is the preferred dock when the sea is rough.

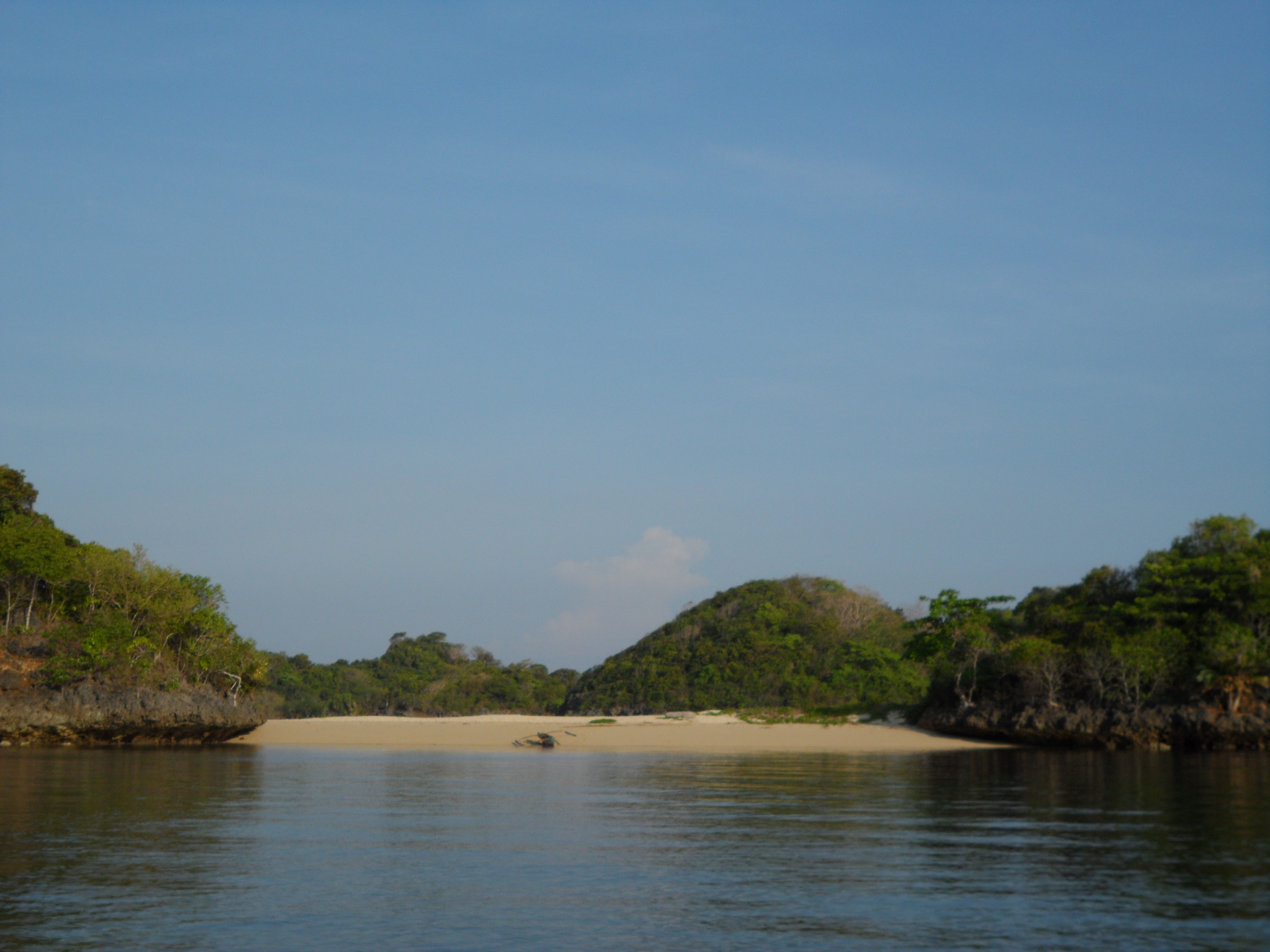
Banago area sandbar, one of two in Taklong island that connects two adjacent islands or islets
