= Guimaras oil spill =

2006 environmental disaster in Panay Gulf, Philippines

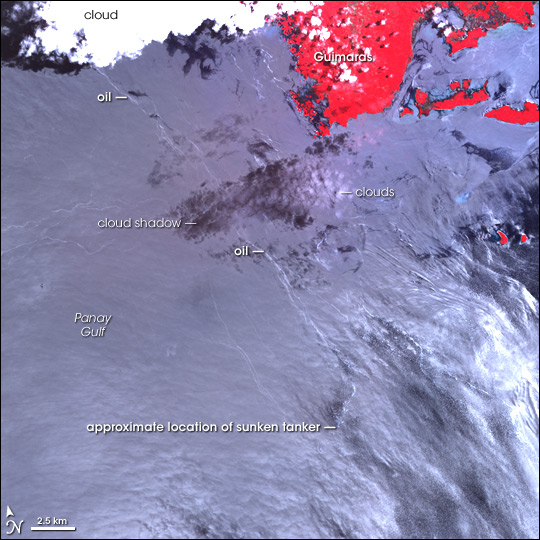
- A map showing the extent of the Guimaras oil spill.
- Interactive map of Guimaras oil spill
- Location: Guimaras Strait, Philippines
- Coordinates: 10°13′N 122°30′E
- Date: 11 August 2006

Cause
- Cause: Sinking of MT Solar 1 during storm
- Casualties: 1 dead, 2 missing
- Operator: Sunshine Maritime Development Corporation, Petron Corporation

Spill characteristics
- Volume: 500,000 litres (110,000 imp gal; 130,000 US gal)

On August 11, 2006, an oil spill occurred in Panay Gulf when the oil tanker, MT Solar 1, sank off the coasts of Guimaras and Negros in the Philippines, causing what is considered to be the worst oil spill in the country's history.

== Background ==
The MT Solar 1, carrying more than two million liters of bunker fuel, sank during a violent storm approximately 20.5 kilometres (12.7 mi) off the southern coast of Guimaras around midnight on August 11, 2006, causing an unknown amount of oil to pour into the gulf, that traveled up through the Guimaras Strait and Iloilo Strait. Only 9000 L of oil was siphoned from the sunken tanker, at a depth of more than 600 metres (2,000 ft), in March 2007.

The oil spill adversely affected marine sanctuaries and mangrove reserves in three out of five municipalities in Guimaras Island and reached the shores of Iloilo and Negros Occidental. The oil spill occurred in the Guimaras Strait that connects the Visayan Sea with the Sulu Sea, and is considered a rich fishing ground that supplies most of the demand for the entire country. (NDCC, August 2006)

Haribon sent two biologists to Guimaras to assess the damage and talk to the affected communities regarding their immediate needs. Haribon provided assistance particularly for the long-term rehabilitation of the area. The government evacuated the affected families who had been exposed to the toxic elements of the crude oil. According to reports gathered in the field, people contracted skin diseases associated with these elements.

== Causes ==
Several causes for the oil spill have been cited, including bad weather and human error. Allegations have been made that the tanker only had a capacity of 1.2 million liters, implying the possibility of overloading. Other investigations have claimed that the ship's captain was not qualified to sail the vessel.

== Effects ==
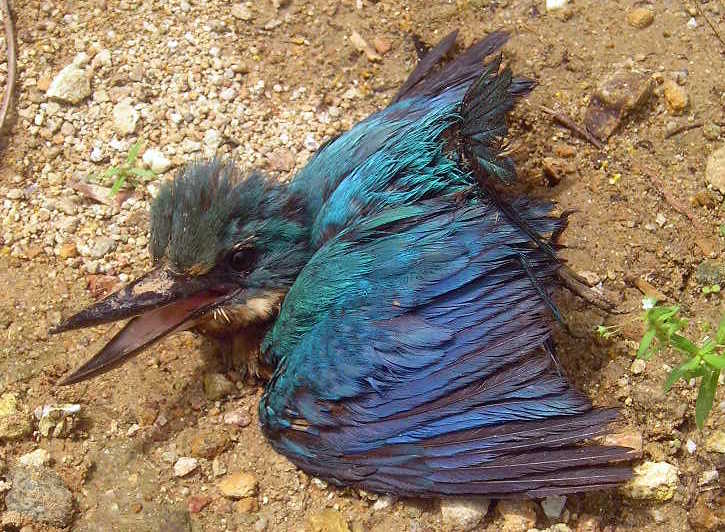
The Taklong Island National Marine Reserve was severely damaged. This bird was rescued in one of the mangroves being cleaned up.

The spill damaged Taklong Island National Marine Reserve, a marine sanctuary for feeding and breeding ground for fish and other species. The oil slick also posed a threat to the blue crab industry in the municipality of Enrique B. Magalona in Negros Occidental.

Dr. Jose Ingles, eco-region coordinator of the World Wide Fund for Nature in the Philippines, Indonesia and Malaysia, said that the damage may be felt by at least two generations. He warned that the disaster may have damaged the reefs and mangroves, scarring the ecosystem and causing seafood yields to significantly decrease. According to him, the worst hit would be the shorelines, the coasts and the swamplands with mangroves. This will greatly impact the livelihood of the fisherfolk, mostly living in poor conditions.

In the south-southeast of the spill site is located the Sulu Sea, a deep-water area frequented by commercially valued fish such as blue marlin and the yellowfin tuna, prized by the towns of southern Negros Occidental province as an important source of income for the communities. The oil slick may damage this thriving local industry.

On August 22, 2006, the Philippine Coast Guard stated that the spill has affected 20 communities in 4 municipalities in Guimaras. It also threatened 27 communities in Iloilo province and 17 others in Negros Occidental.

== Casualties ==
A villager from Barangay Lapaz, Nueva Valencia, Guimaras, became the first casualty directly affected by the spill. He died after inhaling the fumes of the oil sludge caused him to contract cardio-respiratory disease. Two sailors from the ship were also reported missing.

== Legal Case ==
In June 2009, nearly 1000 victims, supported by activists and civil society organizations, filed a P291 million-damage class suit against Petron Corporation and the Sunshine Maritime Development Corp. which owned the Solar I, as well as International Oil Pollution Compensation (IOPC) Fund. The trial on the case started in 2014 and was still ongoing as of 2025, although the claimants lost a petition for partial judgement to expedite the case since the court ruled that the evidence presented by the victims was still "subject to rebuttal evidence", and that the case would thus have to continue.

== Response ==
Due to the extent of the disaster, the cleanup was expected to reach three years.

=== Local response ===
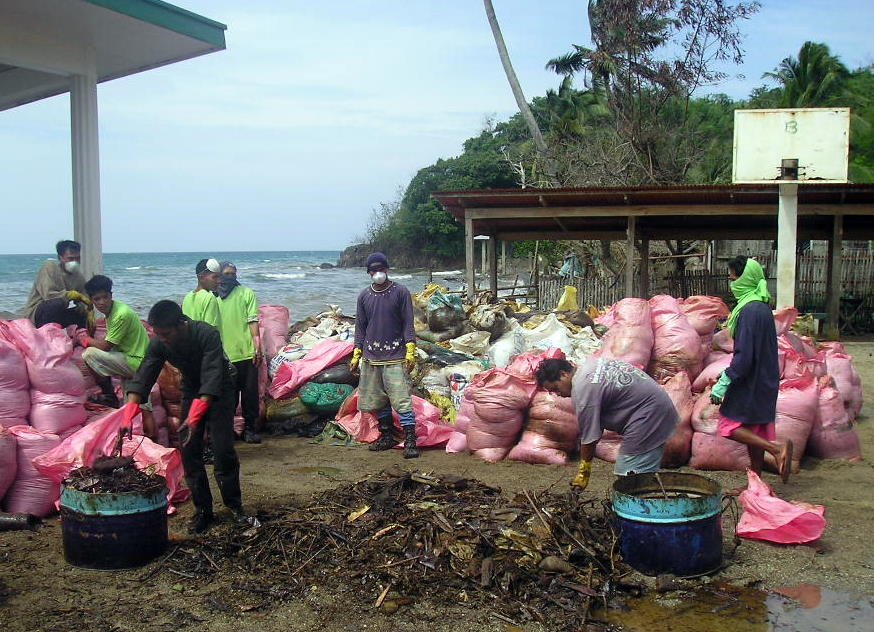
Cleanup in Barangay La Paz, Nueva Valencia, Guimaras

On August 19, the Philippine government has asked the governments of Indonesia, Japan and the United States to help assist with the cleanup.

President Gloria Macapagal Arroyo created Task Force Guimaras on August 22 in order to oversee both the cleanup of the oil spill and the retrieval of the 1.5 million liters of fuel oil still remaining inside the tanker. The government also ordered the creation of the Special Board of Marine Inquiry to determine who and what caused the spill.

Guimaras Governor JC Rahman Nava has objected to the proposal of disposing the oil wastes within the province.

Clemente Cancio, President of Sunshine Maritime Development Corporation (SMDC), the company which owned MT Solar I, said that their foreign insurer was willing to pay the cost of damage brought about by the oil spill.

President Gloria Arroyo ordered a full investigation into the country's worst oil spill that devastated marine ecosystems in the central Philippines. Arroyo also ordered the Justice Department to join a special task force heading an investigation and cleanup on the island of Guimaras, where some 300 kilometers (190 mi) of coastline, including stretches of pristine beaches, had been affected by the oil slick from the sunken tanker. "We shall do everything in our power to right the wrongs caused by this unfortunate incident," Arroyo said after visiting the island, adding that she was deeply pained by the disaster that she declared a "national calamity".

=== International response ===
On August 17, British oil experts, sent by SMDC's foreign insurer, arrived in Guimaras to assess the situation. SMDC stated that the experts will check the extent of the oil pollution. The Britons conducted an aerial survey over Guimaras Island and made recommendations based on their findings.

A four-man team from the U.S. Coast Guard arrived on August 23 to assist in determining the exact location of the tanker.

== See also ==
- List of maritime disasters in the Philippines
- Oriental Mindoro oil spill
