= Guimaras Strait =

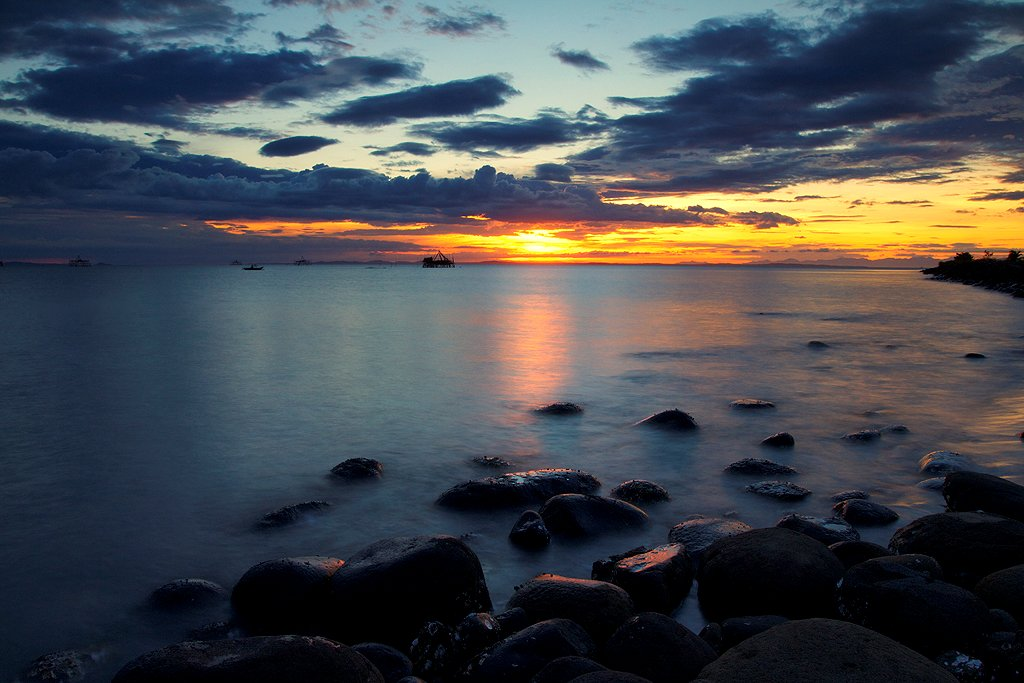
- Guimaras Strait at Bacolod

- Location within the Philippines

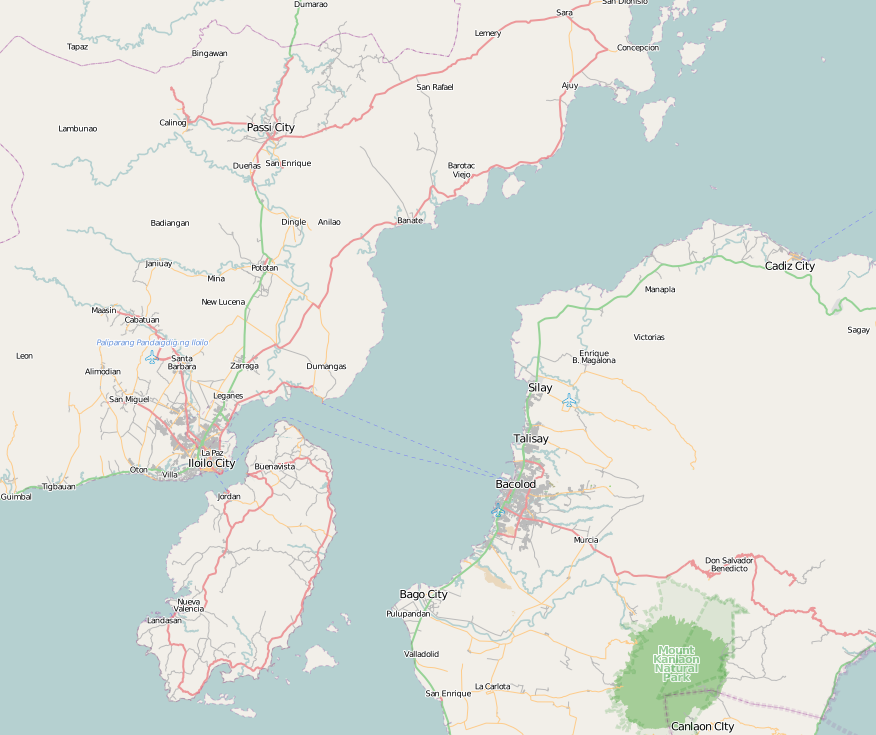
- Location: Western Visayas
- Coordinates: 10°42′N 122°49′E
- Type: strait
- Basin countries: Philippines
- Max. length: 95 km (59 mi), N-S
- Islands: Guimaras, Pan de Azucar
- Settlements: Bacolod

Guimaras Strait is a strait in the Western Visayas region of the Philippines, connecting the Visayan Sea with Panay Gulf and the Sulu Sea beyond. To the north and west are Panay and Guimaras Islands, while Negros Island is to the south and east. Bacolod City is a major seaport on the strait, which also provides access to the Port of Iloilo City via the Iloilo Strait.

== Marine species ==
The Guimaras Strait is an important fishing ground in the Philippines, having an average of annual fish production of 50,000 metric tons. The northern part is particularly known for blue crab, a top export commodity.

Other species present in the strait include barracuda, cavalla, clams, cockles, crevalle, dolphin, flounders, flying fish, fusiliers, glassfish, goatfish, goby, grouper, jacks, jelly fish, lizard fish, marine turtle, milkfish, mojarra, moonfish, moray, mullets, mussels, scallops, oysters, perchlet, scads, sea bass, sea catfish, sea cucumber, sea perches, sea urchins, seaweeds, shads, sicklefish, siganids, sillago, slipmouth, snappers, spadefish, sponges, surgeon fish, threadfin, and wrasses.

== Environmental issues ==
The Guimaras oil spill, that occurred in Panay Gulf on August 11, 2006, has severely affected the fishing industry. During this spill, considered Philippines' worst, the oil tanker M/T Solar 1 sank during a violent storm, spilling some 500,000 litres (110,000 imp gal; 130,000 US gal) of oil which formed an oil slick that drifted through the strait. This spill followed another one in December 2005, when a passenger ship ran aground in the strait. It spilled 360,000 litres (79,000 imp gal; 95,000 US gal) of fuel oil, polluting some 40 kilometres (25 mi) of coastline and 230 hectares (570 acres) of virgin mangrove forests.

Besides these oil spills, the ecosystems of the Guimaras Strait also suffer from rapid coastal development and overfishing. Increased urban populations and transportation are causing anthropogenic pressures, while gillnet fishing has exceeded the maximum sustainable yield since 1999.
