= Guimaras =

- Province
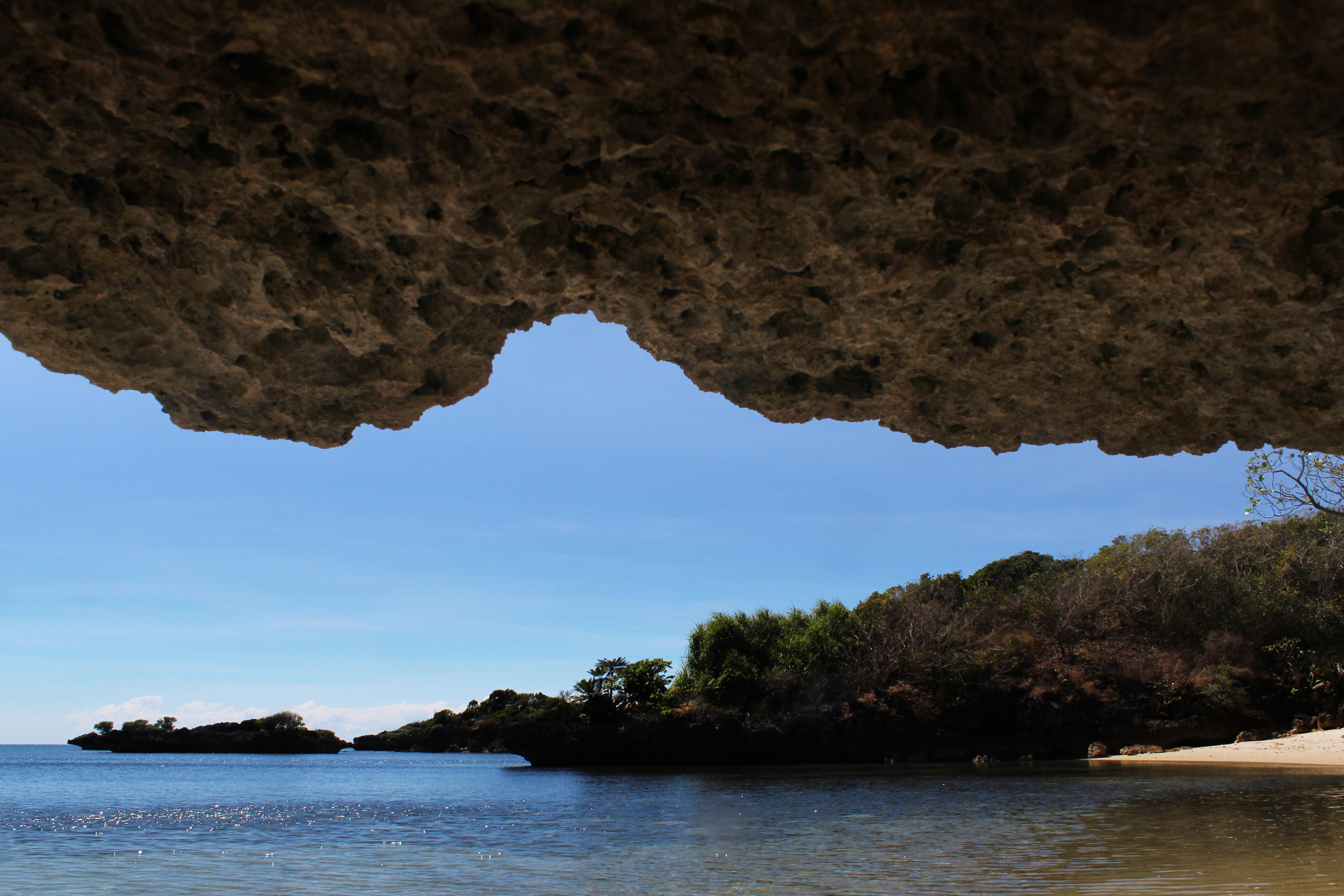
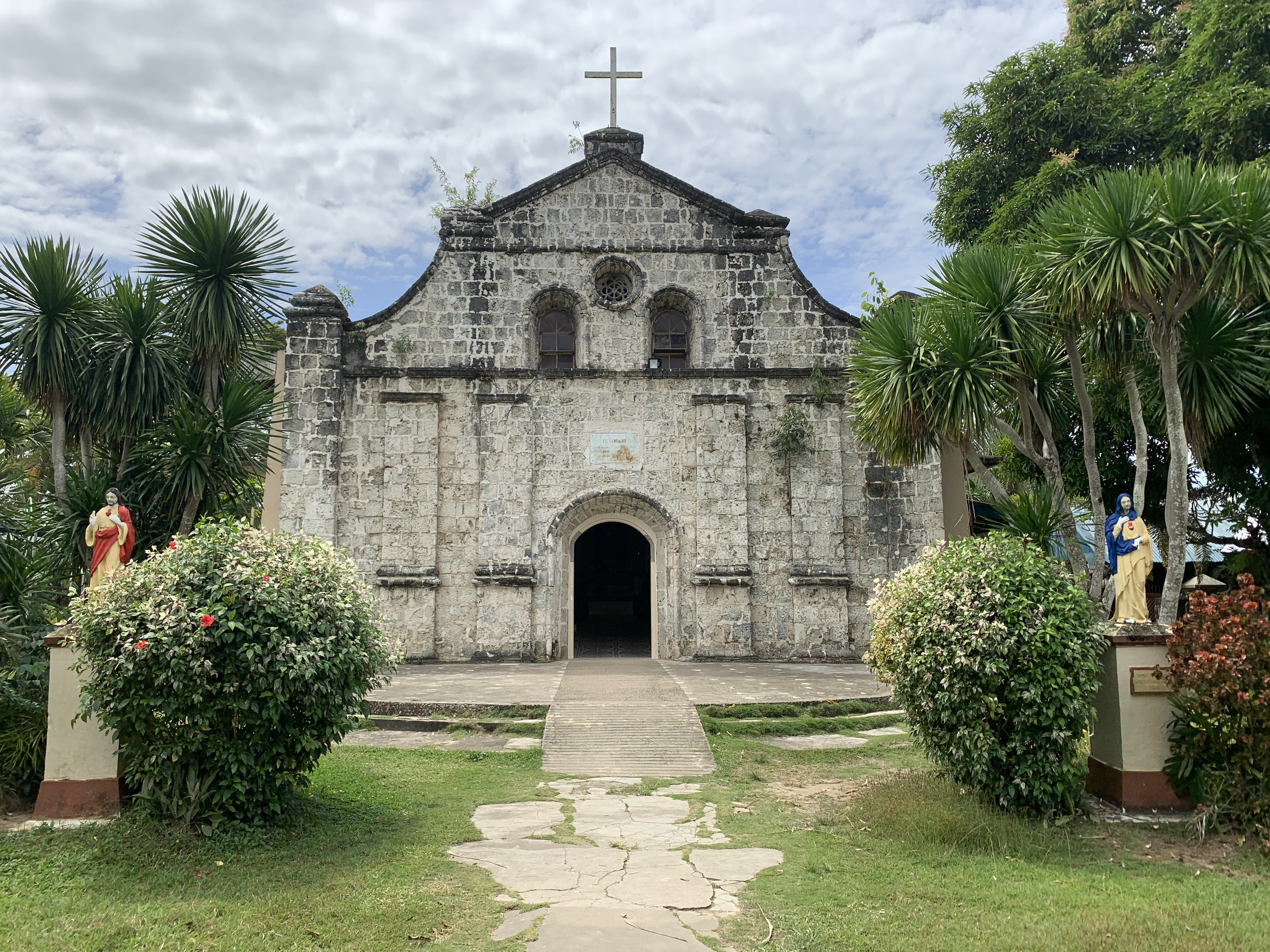
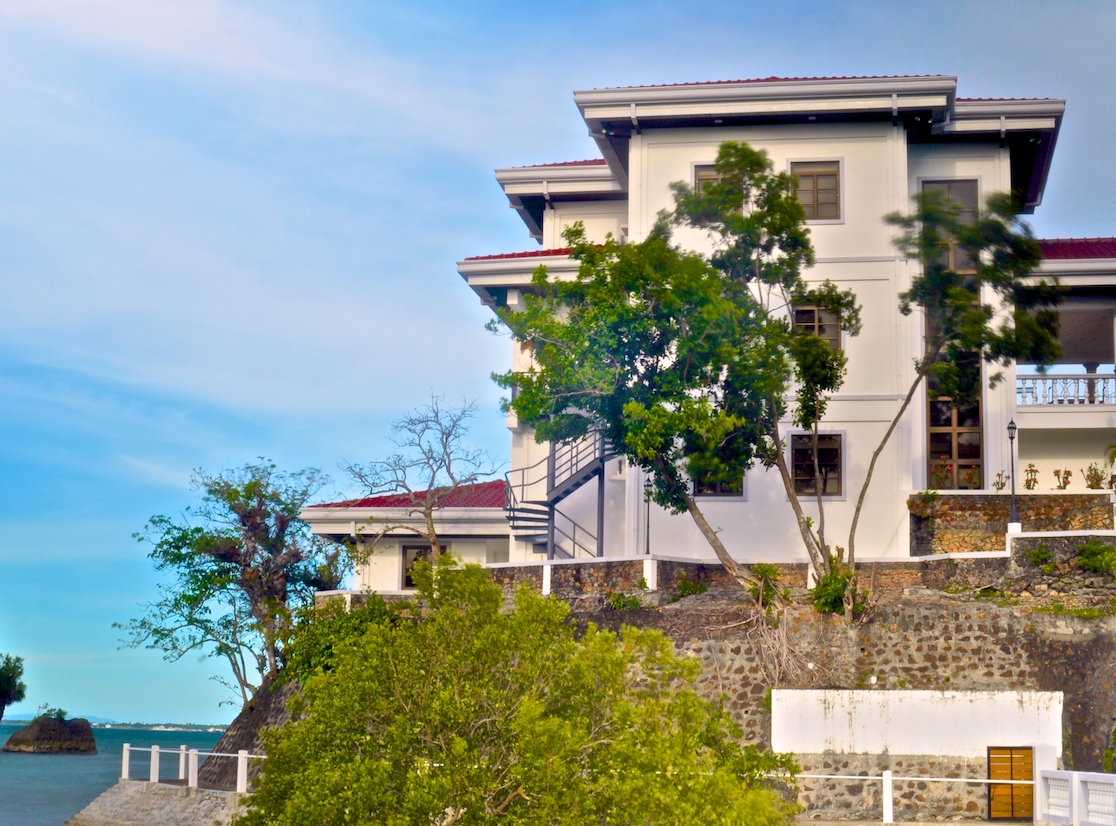
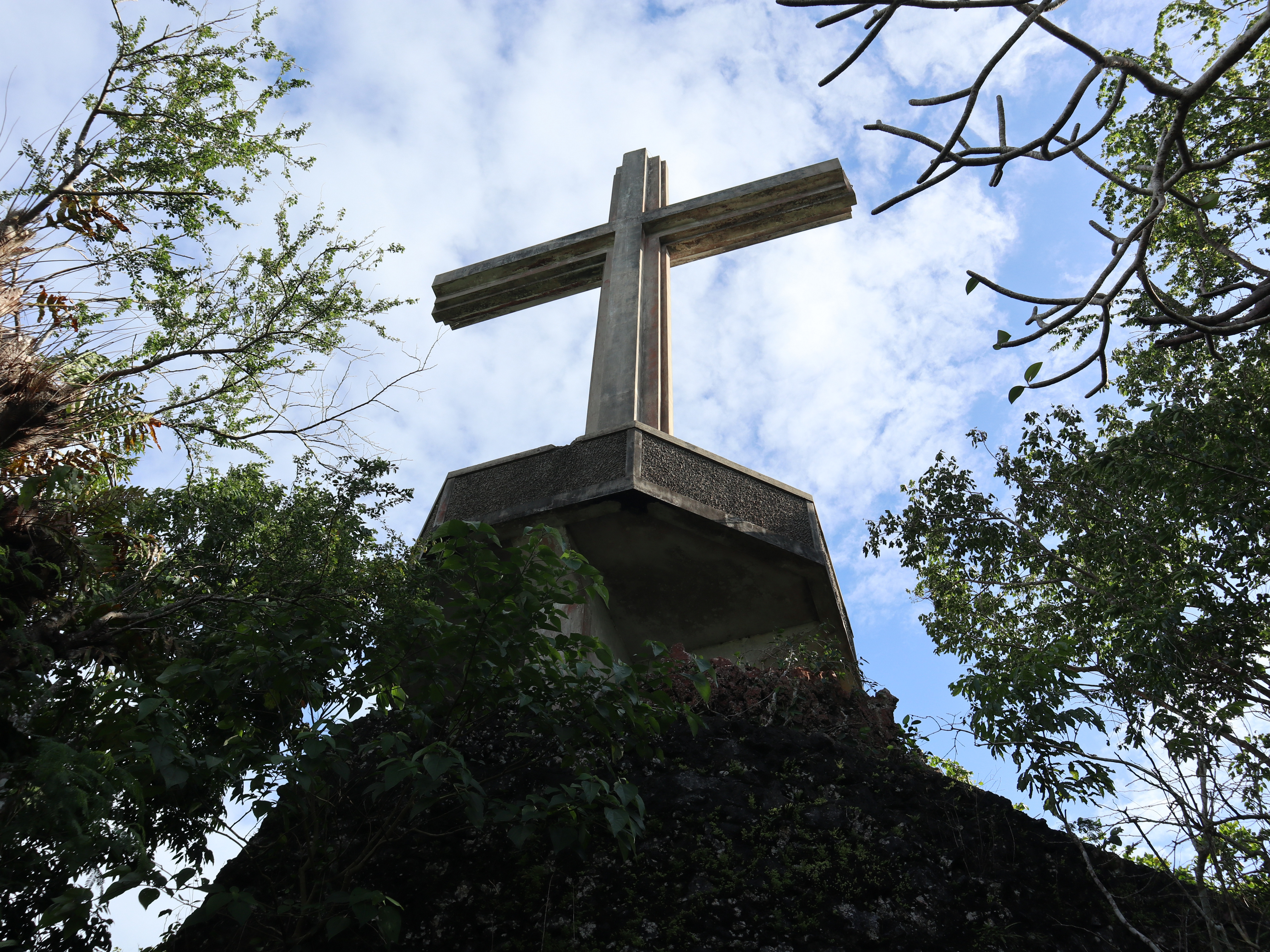
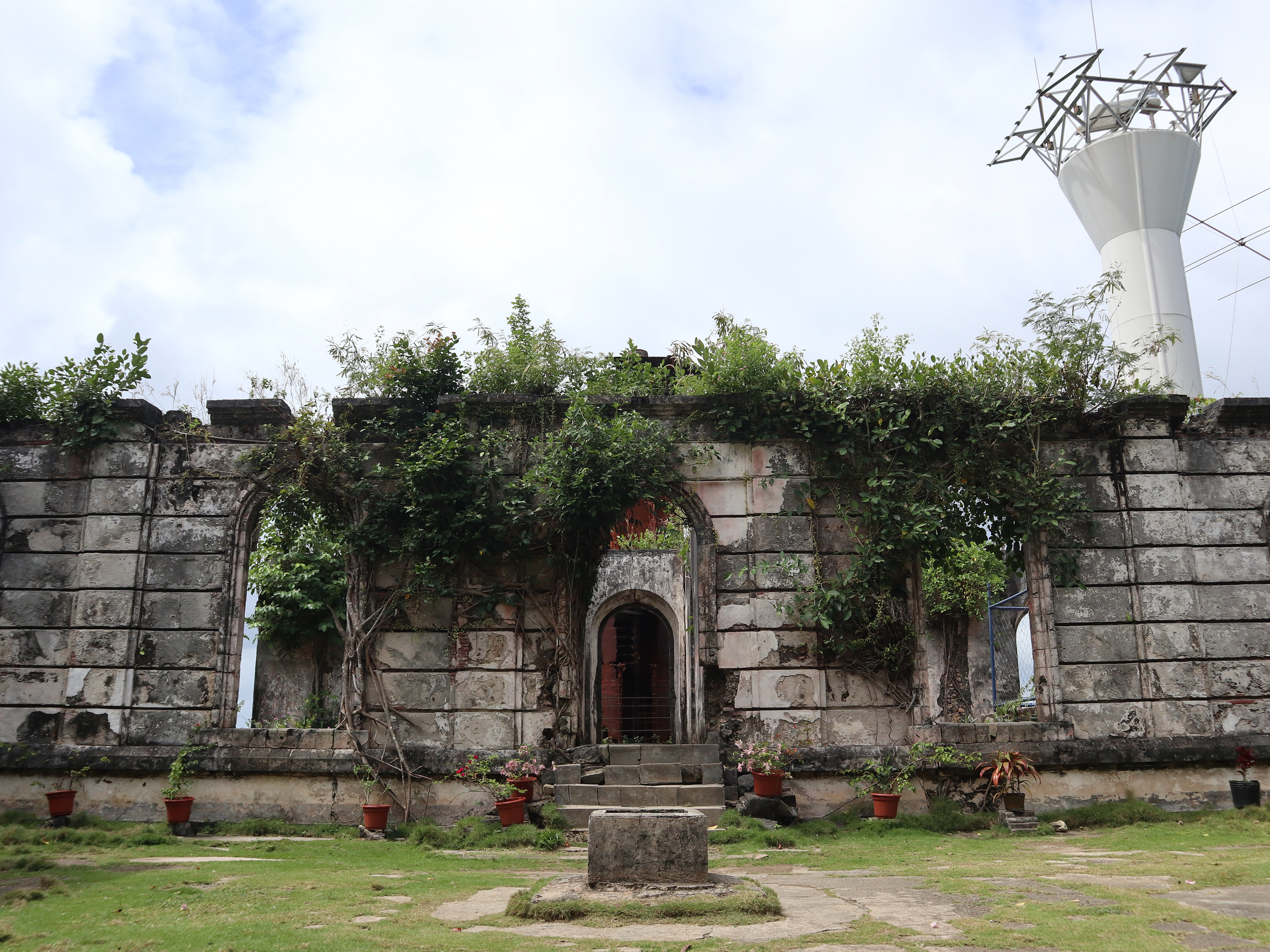
- (clockwise from top) Taklong Island, Roca Encantada, Guisi Lighthouse ruins, Balaan Bukid Cross, and Navalas Church

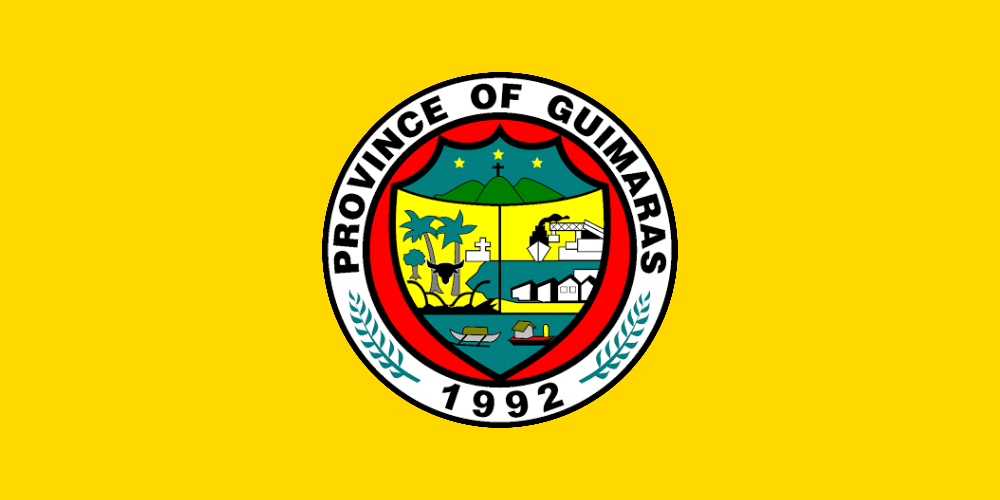
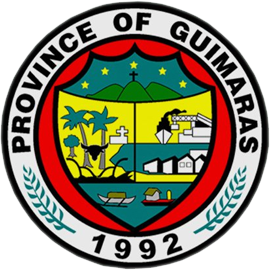
- Flag Seal
- Nickname: Mango Capital of the Philippines
- Location in the Philippines
- Interactive map of Guimaras
- Coordinates: 10°34′N 122°35′E
- Country: Philippines
- Region: Western Visayas
- Spanish Settlement: 1581
- Founded: May 22, 1992
- Capital: Jordan
- Largest Municipality: Buenavista

Government
  - Type: Sangguniang Panlalawigan
  - Governor: Ma. Lucille L Nava (NUP)
  - Vice Governor: Cecile C. Gumarin (NUP)
  - Representative: Joaquin Carlos Rahman A. Nava (NUP)
  - Legislature: Guimaras Provincial Board
  - Electorate: 124,930 voters (2025)

Area
  - Total: 604.57 km^{2} (233.43 sq mi)
  - Rank: 77th out of 82
- Highest elevation (Mount Bontoc): 272 m (892 ft)

Population (2024 census)
  - Total: 192,874
  - Rank: 74th out of 82
  - Density: 319.03/km^{2} (826.28/sq mi)
  - Rank: 28th out of 82
  - Households: 40,497
- Demonym: Guimarasnon

Divisions
  - Independent cities: 0
  - Component cities: 0
  - Municipalities: 5: Buenavista; Jordan; Nueva Valencia; San Lorenzo; Sibunag
  - Barangays: 98
  - Districts: Legislative district of Guimaras

Economy
  - Income class: 2nd provincial income class
  - Poverty incidence: 3.8% (2023)
  - Revenue: ₱ 1,223 million (2024)
  - Assets: ₱ 4,397 million (2024)
  - Expenditure: ₱ 1,133 million (2024)
  - Liabilities: ₱ 793.2 million (2024)
  - GDP: ₱16.13 billion $275.2 million
- Time zone: UTC+8 (PHT)
- PSGC: 067900000
- IDD : area code: +63 (0)33
- ISO 3166 code: PH-GUI
- Spoken languages: Hiligaynon; Kinaray-a; Ati; Filipino; English
- Website: guimaras.gov.ph

Guimaras ([ɡimaˈɾas]), officially the Province of Guimaras (Hiligaynon: Kapuoran sang Guimaras; Tagalog: Lalawigan ng Guimaras), is an island province in the Philippines located in the Western Visayas region. The capital is Jordan, while the largest local government unit is the municipality of Buenavista. The province is situated in Panay Gulf, between the islands of Panay and Negros. To the northwest is the city and province of Iloilo and to the southeast is Negros Occidental. The whole island is part of the Metro Iloilo–Guimaras, one of the twelve metropolitan areas of the Philippines.

The province consists primarily of Guimaras Island, and also includes Inampulugan, Guiwanon (or Guiuanon), Panobolon, Natunga, Nadulao, and many surrounding islets.

Guimaras, formerly known as Himal-os, was a sub-province of Iloilo until it was made an independent province on May 22, 1992.

== History ==
=== Spanish colonial era ===
About 1581, Gonzalo Ronquillo de Peñalosa, Spanish governor and Captain-General of the Philippine Islands, established a settlement in Guimaras for the purpose of Christianizing the island's natives. He and his subordinates organized the pueblicitos or villages of Nayup under the patronage of Saint Peter the Apostle, and Igang with Saint Anne as patroness.

Evangelization of Guimaras occurred around the same time the friars were making inroads in Panay. The Augustinians established the visitas (chapelries) of Nayup and Igang as subordinate to Oton, Iloilo. Gómez Pérez Dasmariñas, the 7th Spanish Governor-General, noted in a June 20, 1591, report to King Philip II that the friars of Oton made regular visits to the island.

In 1742, the island came under the jurisdiction of Dumangas – now known as Iloilo, until 1751 when the Augustinian Order was replaced by the Jesuits, after which the Dominican order took over Guimaras. The Jesuits, who had established a school in Iloilo and had missions in Molo and Arevalo, took charge of the island. By 1755, it was organized into a regular parish. When the population increased considerably, the island was given its municipal status with a seat of government at Tilad (today Buenavista).

=== American colonial era ===
Under American rule, the Guimarasnons were given the opportunity to elect their municipal president in 1908.

Douglas MacArthur, a fresh graduate from West Point as a Second Lieutenant at the age of 23, came to Iloilo as the head of the company of U.S. Army Corps of Engineers. They constructed roads and the Santo Rosario Wharf, presently named MacArthur's Wharf, which are still in use today. In November 1903, while working on Guimaras, he was ambushed by a pair of Filipino brigands or guerrillas; he shot and killed both with his pistol.

=== Japanese occupation ===
In 1942, Japanese Imperial forces landed on Guimaras Island as the Empire of Japan began its occupation of the country during the Second World War. The Japanese controlled almost every island between the Philippines and Hawaii. The U.S. Forces needed these islands to run aircraft to and from the Philippines, while denying Japan usage. The U.S. Army and Navy planned indirect attacks that would eventually lead them to Luzon.

In 1945, the combined United States and Philippine Commonwealth forces landed on Guimaras Island and Inampulungan Island on 19 March, attacking the Japanese and defeating them in the Battle of Guimaras, which led to the liberation of the island.

=== Postwar Era ===
Guimaras gained its status as a sub-province of Iloilo through Republic Act 4667, which was enacted by Congress on June 18, 1966.

=== Martial law era ===
The beginning months of the 1970s had marked a period of turmoil and change in the Philippines, as well as in Guimaras. During his bid to be the first Philippine president to be re-elected for a second term, Ferdinand Marcos launched an unprecedented number of foreign debt-funded public works projects. This caused the Philippine economy to take a sudden downwards turn known as the 1969 Philippine balance of payments crisis, which led to a period of economic difficulty and a significant rise of social unrest. With only a year left in his last constitutionally allowed term as president, Ferdinand Marcos placed the Philippines under Martial Law in September 1972 and thus retained the position for fourteen more years. This period in Philippine history is remembered for the Marcos administration's record of human rights abuses, particularly targeting political opponents, student activists, journalists, religious workers, farmers, and others who fought against the Marcos dictatorship.

A number of prominent Guimaras natives played an active role in the resistance to the dictatorship, and have since been recognized by having their names inscribed on the wall of remembrance of the Philippines' Bantayog ng mga Bayani memorial, which honors the martyrs and heroes that fought the regime. Among these were activist Maria Luisa “Luing” Posa-Dominado who became well known for escaping from detention soon after every time she was caught; and Nueva Valencia Municipal Councilor 2Lt Pablo G. Fernandez, who refused to be activated as a Philippine Army Reservist if it meant implementing Martial Law, and was detained and summarily executed as a result. There was also Alpha Phi Omega fraternity Grand Chancellor Edgardo Dojillo, whose family hailed from Guimaras, who led is fraternity in protesting the administration and was targeted and killed in an ambush by the 332nd Philippine Constabulary Company just a few weeks after the martial law declaration.

Many of those caught (labelled political detainees) because no actual cases were filed against them, were detained in Camp Martin Delgado in Iloilo, the nearest major facility under the Regional Command for the Administration III (RECAD III) in the Visayas.

=== Provincial Status ===
Guimaras was proclaimed as a regular and full-fledged province on May 11, 1992, after a plebiscite was conducted to ratify the approval of its conversion pursuant to Section 462 of R.A. 7160.

Shortly after Guimaras acquired its provincial status, President Fidel V. Ramos appointed Emily Relucio-López as its first Governor.

The province of Guimaras was originally composed of three municipalities: Buenavista, Jordan, and Nueva Valencia. In 1995, through Republic Act No. 7896 and Republic Act No. 7897, the municipalities of Sibunag and San Lorenzo were created. The two new municipalities officially acquired their municipal status after the May 8, 1995, plebiscite held simultaneously with the local election.

Ernesto L. Gedalanga was the first appointed mayor of Sibunag and Arsenio Zambarrano was also appointed mayor of San Lorenzo. The temporary seat of government of the Municipality of Sibunag is at Barangay Dasal while the temporary seat of Government of the Municipality of San Lorenzo is at Barangay Cabano.

=== Contemporary ===
==== Guimaras oil spill ====
In August 2006, the Guimaras oil spill occurred. The 998-ton MT Solar 1, chartered by Petron (the Philippines' largest oil refiner), carrying 2.4 million litres of bunker fuel, sank 17 kilometres (11 mi) off the island's southern coast, contaminating 24 square kilometres (9.3 sq mi). The Philippine Coast Guard called this the worst oil spill in the country's history. According to officials, 1,100 hectares (2,700 acres) of mangroves were affected, including parts of the Taklong Island National Marine Reserve.

== Geography ==
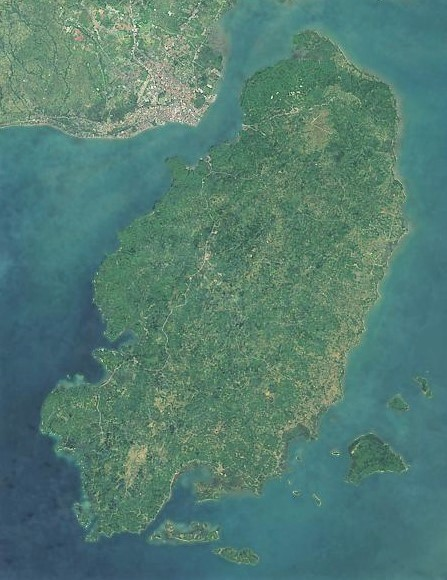
Guimaras island satellite image

Guimaras comprises primarily of Guimaras Island, and numerous minor islets, prominent among which are Inampulugan, Guiwanon (or Guiuanon), Panobolon, Natunga and Nadulao. The province covers a total area of 604.57 square kilometres (233.43 sq mi) occupying the southeastern section of the Western Visayas region.

Sibunag River is the longest river in Guimaras with a total length of 28.8 km (17.9 mi) in municipality of Sibunag, followed by Cabano River 23.7 km (14.7 mi) long in San Lorenzo, Mantangingi River 17.4 km in Buenavista.

Mount Bontoc is the highest point in the province of Guimaras with an elevation of 892 ft (272 m) above sea level, located in municipality of Sibunag. Mount Dinulman is the second highest mountain with an elevation of 879 ft (268 m) also located in Sibunag.

The province has 5 municipalities. There is only one legislative district of Guimaras which encompasses all five towns.

Municipality (Note: The globe icon marks the town center.)		Population			±% p.a.	Area		Density		Barangay
		(2020)		(2015)		km^{2}	sq mi	/km^{2}	/sq mi	
Buenavista		28.2%	52,899	50,437	+0.91%	115.60	44.63	460	1,200	36
Jordan	†	21.1%	39,566	36,096	+1.76%	126.11	48.69	310	800	14
Nueva Valencia		22.8%	42,771	39,810	+1.38%	137.12	52.94	310	800	22
San Lorenzo		15.7%	29,444	26,112	+2.31%	106.23	41.02	280	730	12
Sibunag		12.3%	23,162	22,158	+0.85%	126.81	48.96	180	470	14
Total			187,842	174,613	+1.40%	611.87	236.24	310	800	98
	† Provincial capital					Municipality				

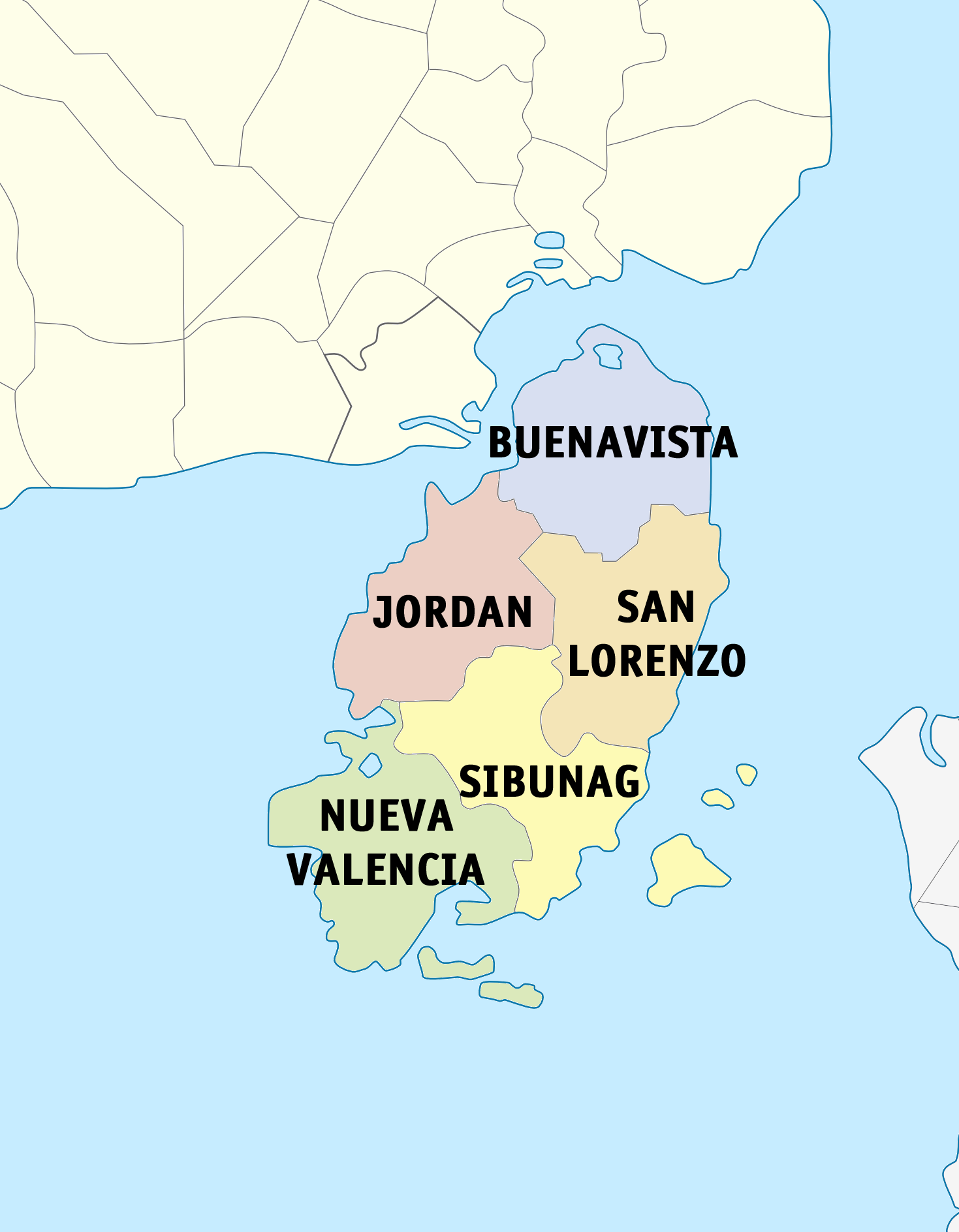
Administrative divisions of Guimaras

== Demographics ==
New Guimaras Capitol Building under construction

Population census of Guimaras
Year	Pop.	±% p.a.
1903	21,467	—
1918	27,170	+1.58%
1939	38,547	+1.68%
1948	40,697	+0.60%
1960	57,560	+2.93%
1970	73,014	+2.40%
1975	84,515	+2.98%
1980	92,382	+1.80%
1990	117,990	+2.48%
1995	126,470	+1.31%
2000	141,450	+2.43%
2007	151,238	+0.93%
2010	162,943	+2.75%
2015	174,613	+1.33%
2020	187,842	+1.55%
2024	192,874	+0.64%
Source: Philippine Statistics Authority

The population of Guimaras in the 2024 census was 192,874 people, with a density of 320 inhabitants per square kilometre or 830 inhabitants per square mile.

=== Language ===
The people of the province, called Guimarasnon, speak Hiligaynon as the primary language, as it was once a sub-province of Iloilo. Filipino and English are widely spoken and understood.

=== Religion ===
==== Catholicism ====
The two predominant religions in the municipality are the Roman Catholic Church and the Iglesia Filipina Independiente (Philippine Independent Church). The St. Paul's Theological Seminary (SPTS) in Jordan is the regional seminary of the Philippine Independent Church serving its Visayas and Mindanao dioceses.

== Economy ==
Poverty incidence of Guimaras (%)

Source: Philippine Statistics Authority

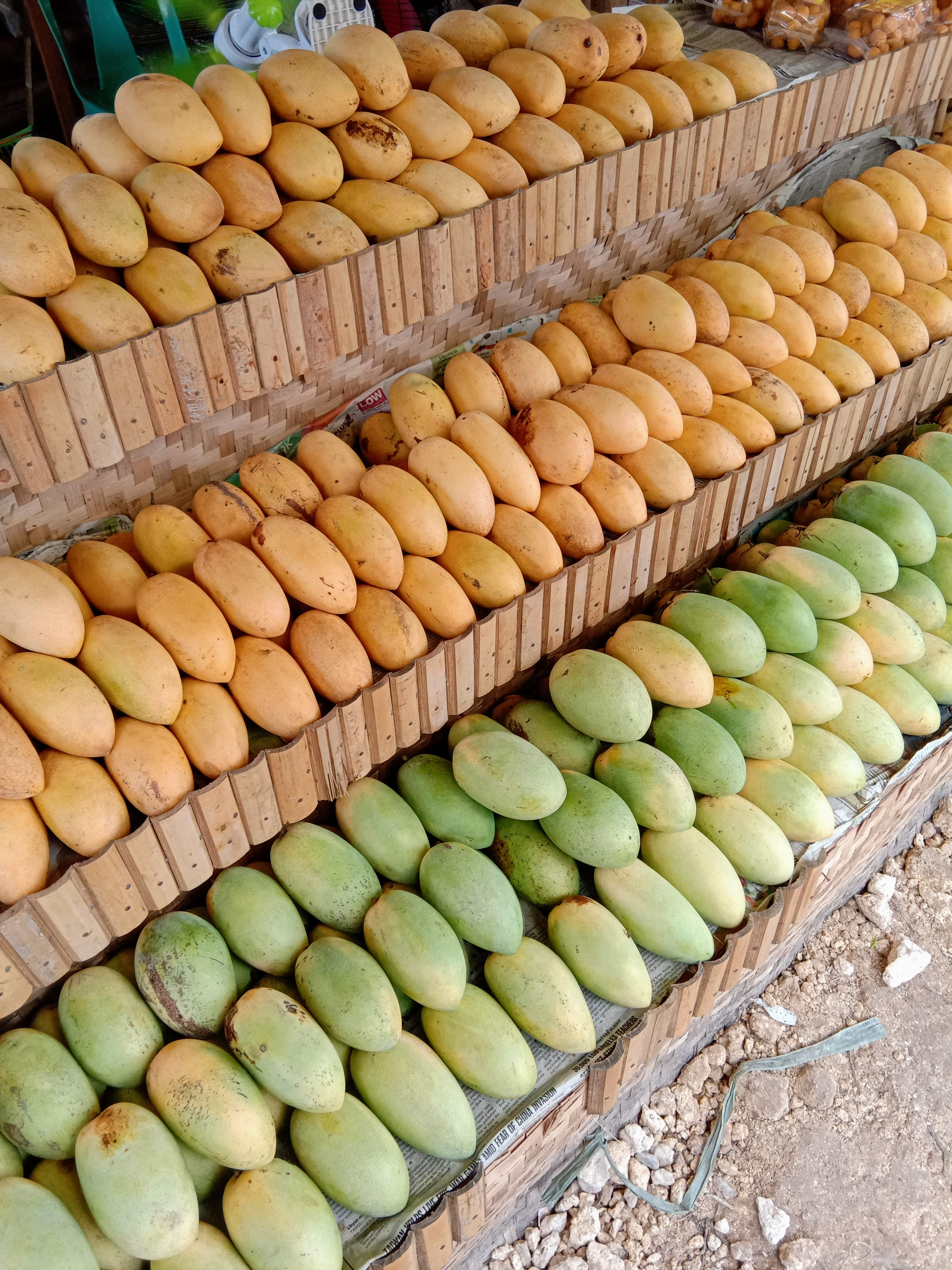
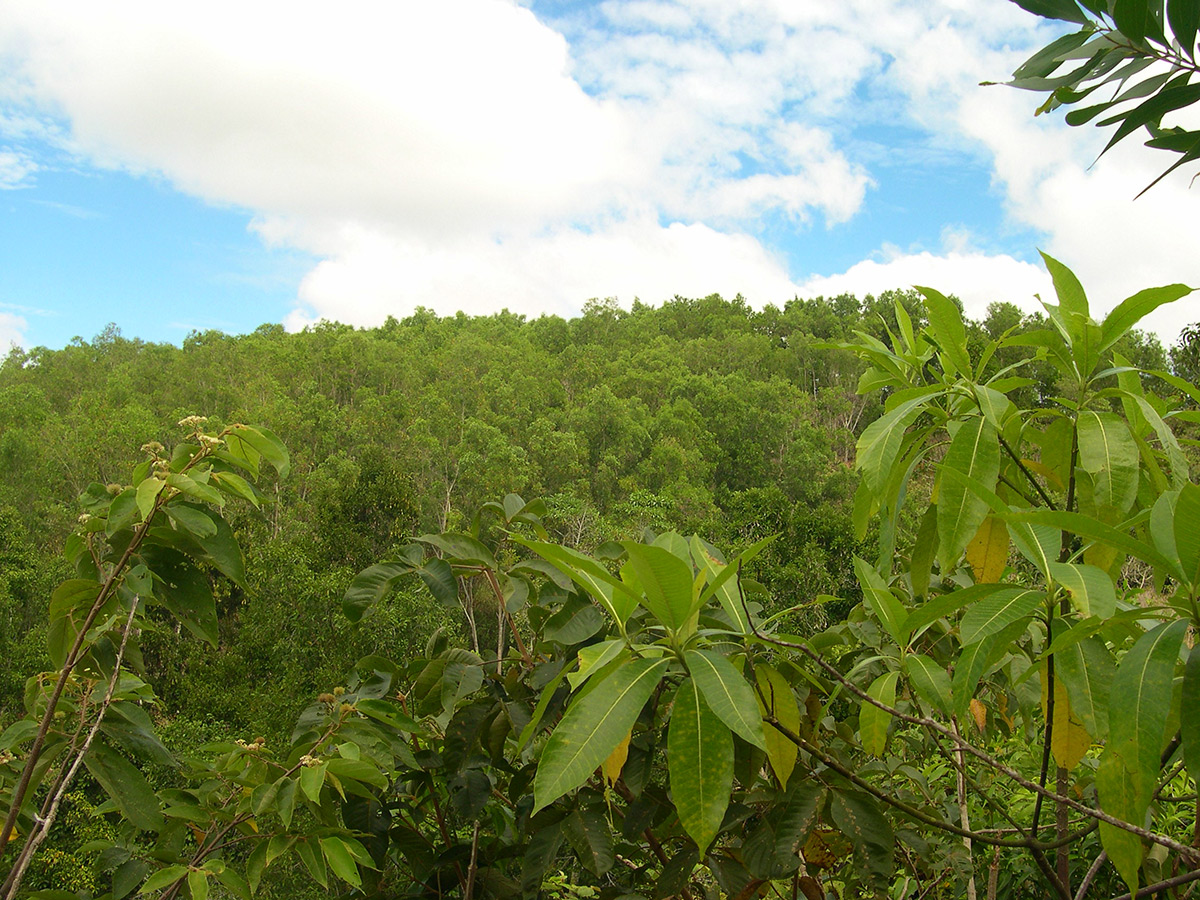
Mangoes on display in the market (left); plantations (right)

The sectors having the most potential to support Guimaras's economic development are mangoes, tourism, cashew cultivation, and food processing. Another expanding sector is fishery, which includes growing seaweed. Infrastructure, capacity-building initiatives, more favorable legislation, and higher investments are just a few examples of local variables that have boosted the potential growth of these industries.

Guimaras is well known for its agricultural crops, particularly the mangoes, half of all exported mangoes come from this island. The island province is famous for producing one of the sweetest mangoes in the world, thus earning the nickname "Mango Capital of the Philippines" from local and foreign tourists. Guimaras mangoes are reportedly served at the White House and Buckingham Palace. Guimaras's largest event of the year is the Manggahan Festival (the Mango Festival). The variety of mangoes produced are also best for making dried mangoes, jam and other special delicacies. They also produce other fruits and vegetables such as bananas, tomatoes, and eggplants among others.

== Transportation ==
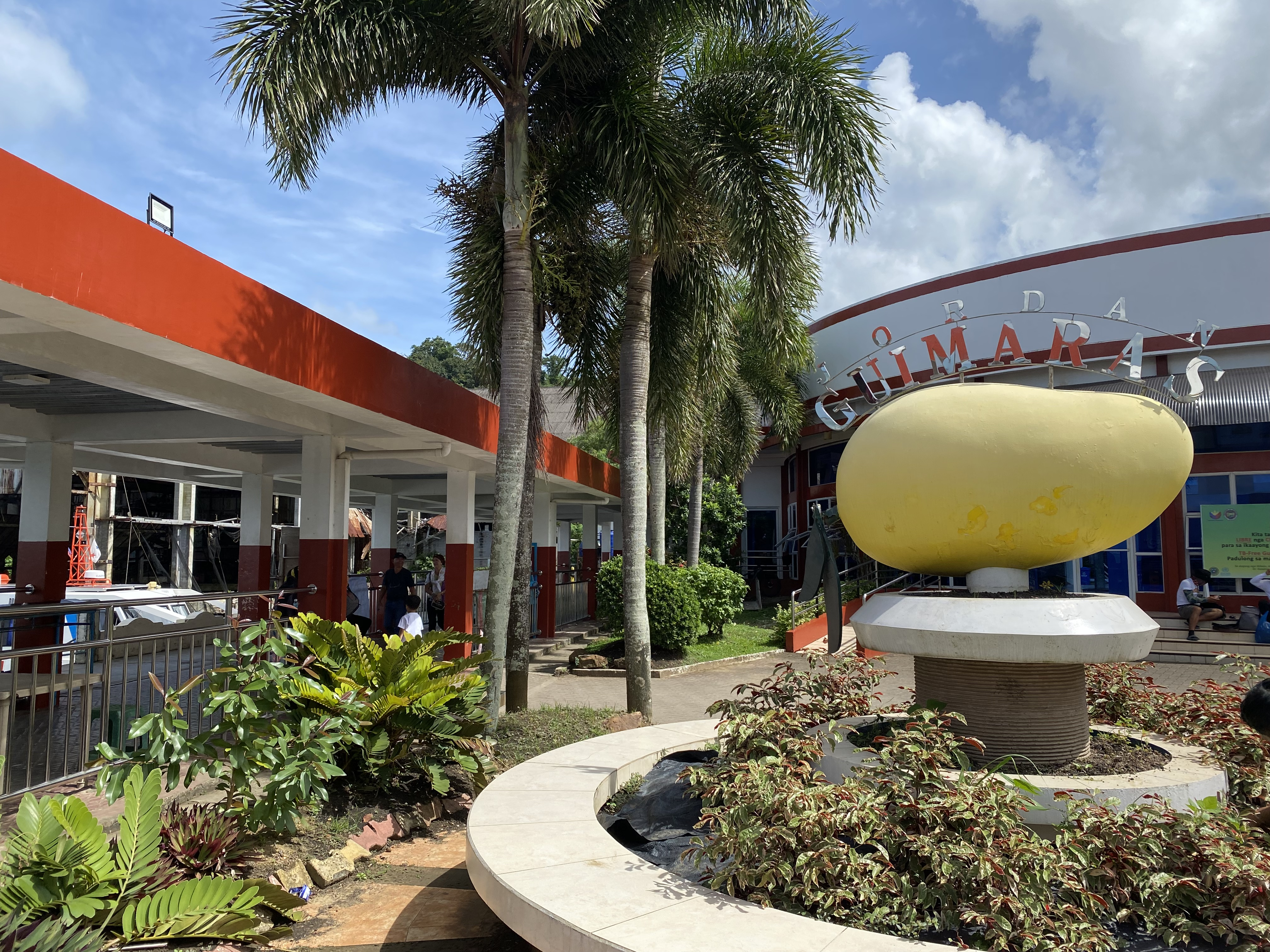
Jordan Port with welcome sign

Steel or Fiberglass Ferry boats ply regularly from Iloilo-Guimaras Ferry Terminal in Iloilo City Proper to Jordan, Guimaras and Buenavista, Guimaras, taking about 15 to 20 minutes per journey. RORO or roll-on/roll-off vessels sail from Lapuz, Iloilo City to Jordan Port in Jordan, Guimaras, every 30 minutes to one hour starting at 4:30AM to 6:30PM, taking about 30mins per way.

There is also a Ferry plying from Sibunag Port to Pulupandan in Negros Occidental.

== Government ==
The Governor of Guimaras is Ma. Lucille L. Nava, of the National Unity Party. The province's Vice Governor is Cecile Gumarin, a member of National Unity Party. Guimaras is represented in the Philippine House of Representatives by Joaquin Carlos Rahman A. Nava, also a member of National Unity Party.

== Tourism ==
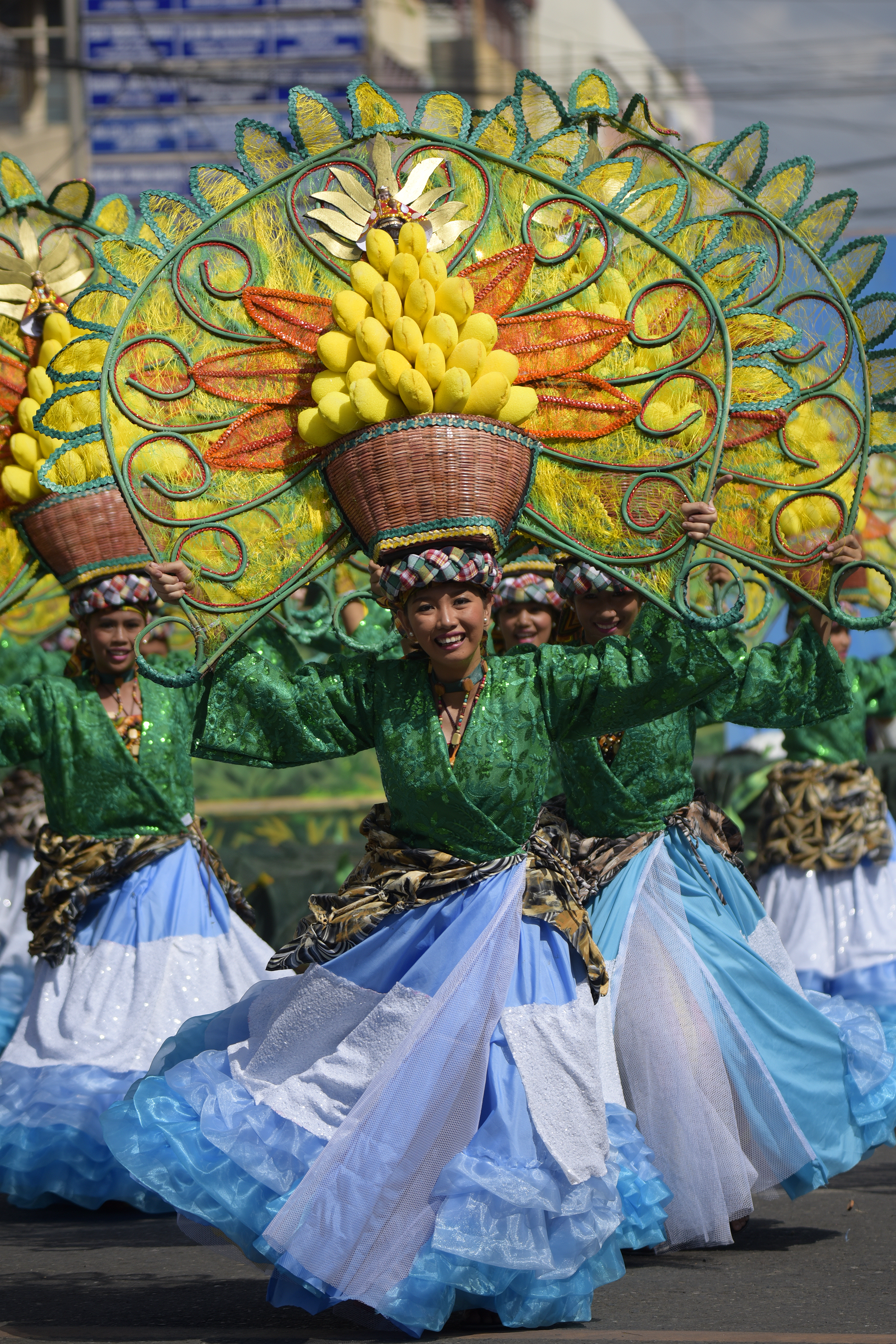
Hubon Guimarasnon of Manggahan Festival, declared champion in Kasadyahan Festival 2018 in Iloilo City

Guimaras attracts tourists particularly in May, when the Manggahan Festival takes place. In the festival, locals wear mango-inspired costumes and design mango-themed floats in a parade that makes its way around the island. Pastries and confectionery with mango ingredients, as well unprepared mangoes, are also sold in relatively large quantities. Tourism also includes visits to agricultural areas across the island, such as the Oro Verde Mango Plantation.

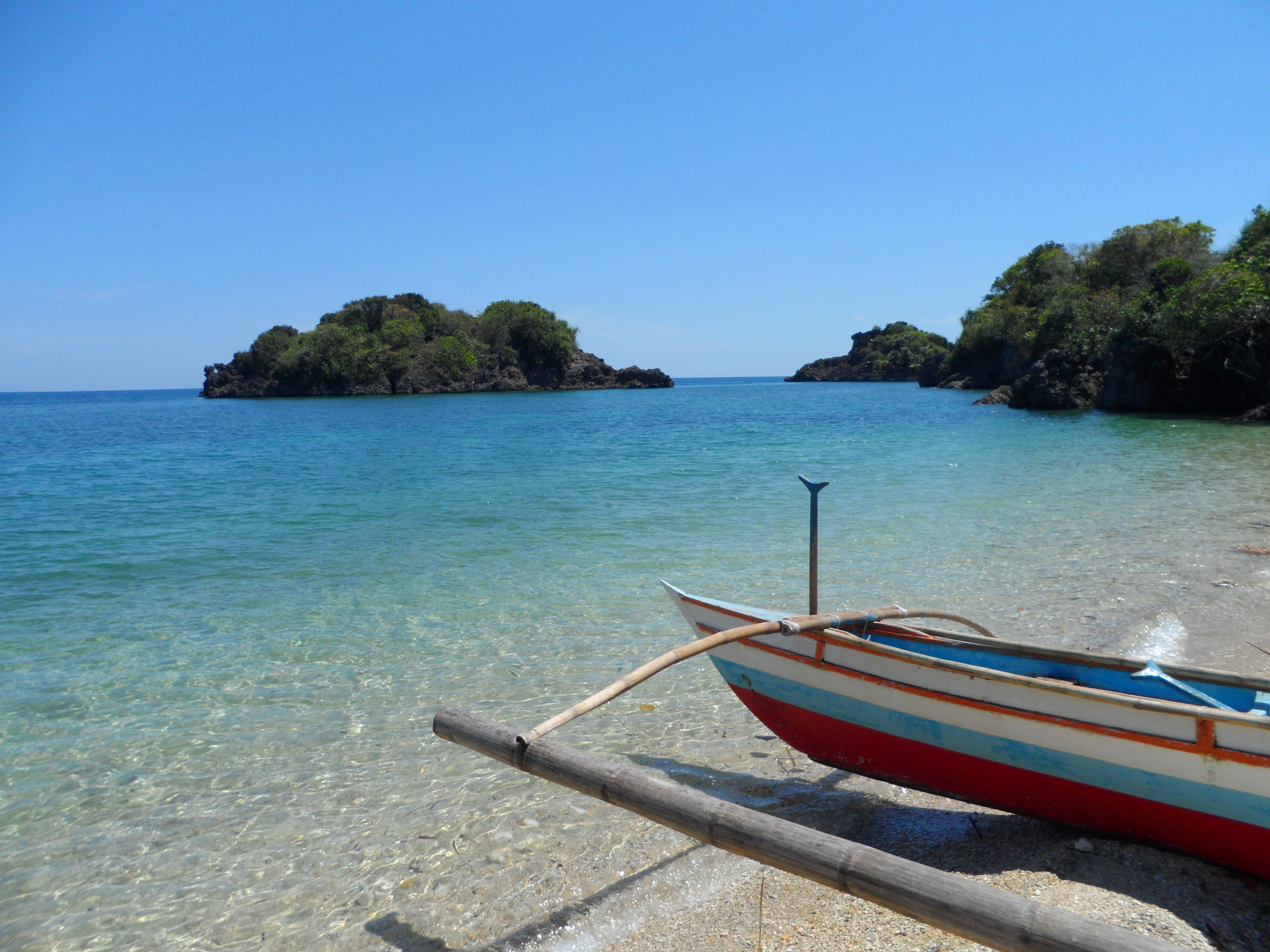
Taklong Island Beach

The island is also a growing destination for ecotourism. Talkong Island, off Guimaras's south coast, is an area of natural beauty recognized by the Philippine government. Tourists frequently visit areas such as the Guisi, Alubihod, Tatlong Pulo, and Natago beaches. Ave Maria Island is another ecological destination near Jordan. Some tourists also choose to visit the San Lorenzo Wind Farm, a series of turbines located near the island's eastern coast.

Guimaras is also a site for religious tourism. The Balaan Bukid Shrine hosts twelve markers of the Way of the Cross as individuals make an ascent towards a hilltop where the main shrine rests. Navalas Church, built between 1880 and 1885, bears one of the few remaining sites of Roman Catholic Spanish heritage on the island. The Trappist Monastery is located near the center of the island, providing a retreat center for visitors in addition to selling various mango-based foodstuffs to help support the monks of the monastery.

== Notable people ==
- Chrisanta Seboc - Child hero who saved two of her younger siblings from a fire at home in July 1996.

== See also ==
- List of islands of the Philippines
- Taklong Island National Marine Reserve
