= Panay Gulf =

Arm of the Sulu Sea between the Philippine islands of Panay and Negros

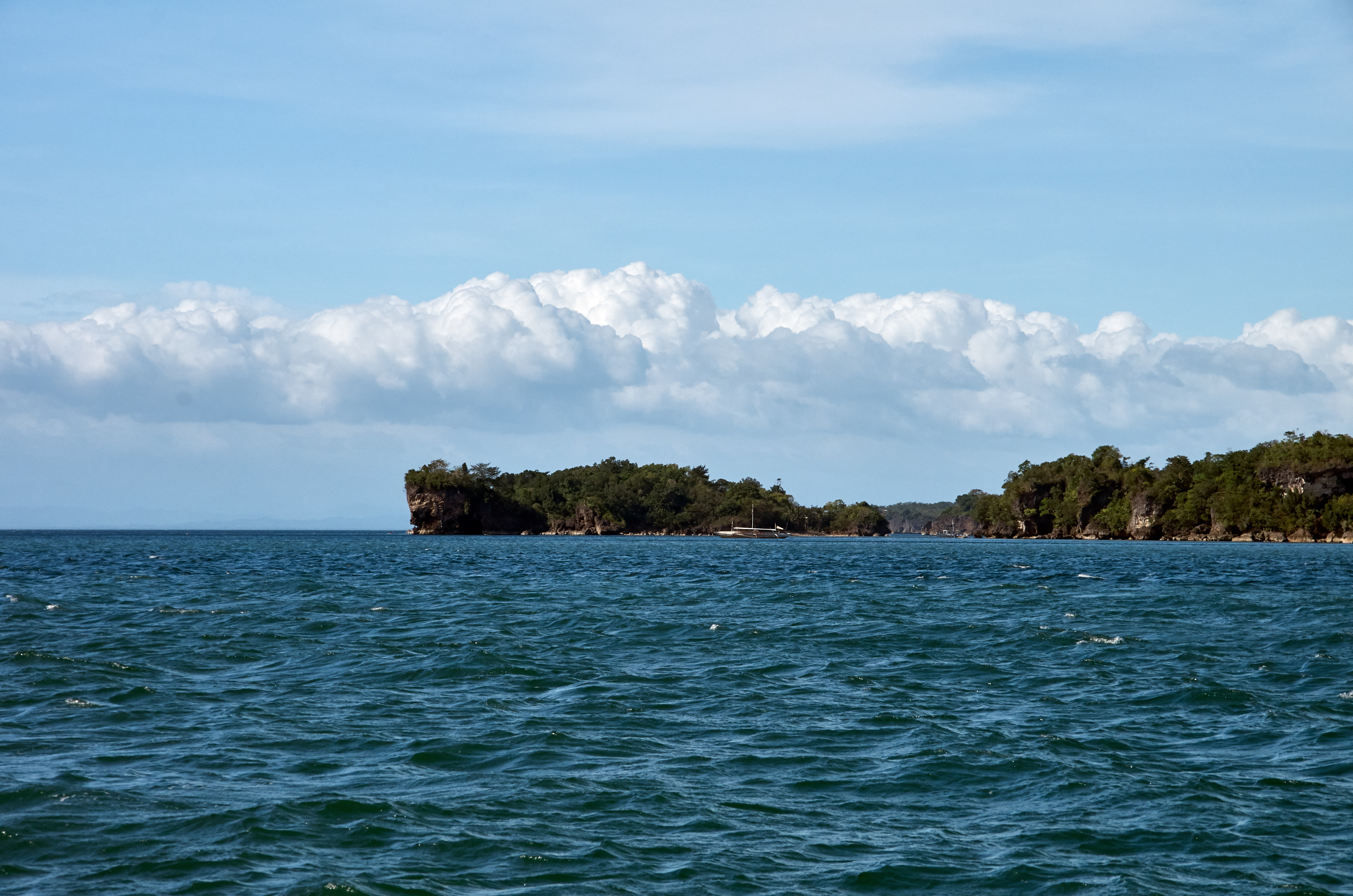
- Guimaras' small islands in Panay Gulf

- Location within the Philippines Panay Gulf (Philippines)
- Location: Western Visayas; Negros Island Region
- Coordinates: 10°15′00″N 122°14′55″E
- Type: gulf
- Etymology: Panay
- Part of: Sulu Sea
- Settlements: Anini-y; Binalbagan; Cauayan; Guimbal; Himamaylan; Hinigaran; Ilog; Iloilo City; Jordan; Kabankalan; Miagao; Nueva Valencia; Oton; Pontevedra; Pulupandan; San Enrique; San Joaquin; Sibunag; Tigbauan; Valladolid

Panay Gulf (Hiligaynon: Gulpo sang Panay; Filipino: Golpo/Look ng Panay) is an extension of the Sulu Sea, reaching between the islands of Panay and Negros in the Philippines. The gulf contains the island-province of Guimaras and extends into the Iloilo Strait, between Panay and Guimaras, and into Guimaras Strait, between Guimaras and Negros. Guimaras Strait connects Panay Gulf with the Visayan Sea.

The Port of Iloilo is the busiest port on the gulf, which is a major route used by ships plying the areas between Iloilo City, Bacolod, and Zamboanga further to the south.

The Panay Landing during World War II occurred in Panay Gulf.
