= Nueva Valencia =

Municipality in Guimaras, Philippines

- Municipality
- Municipality of Nueva Valencia
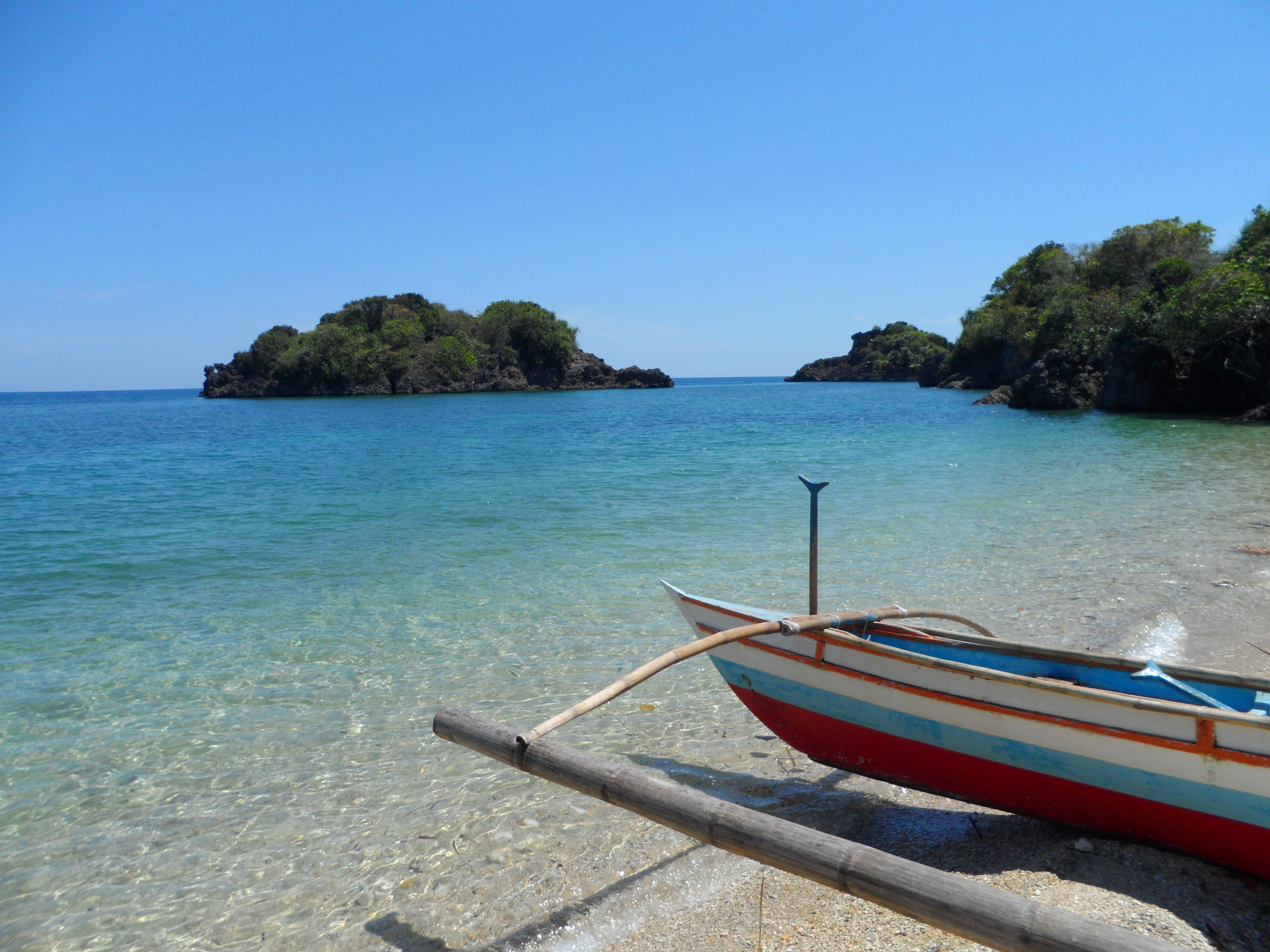
- Taklong Island

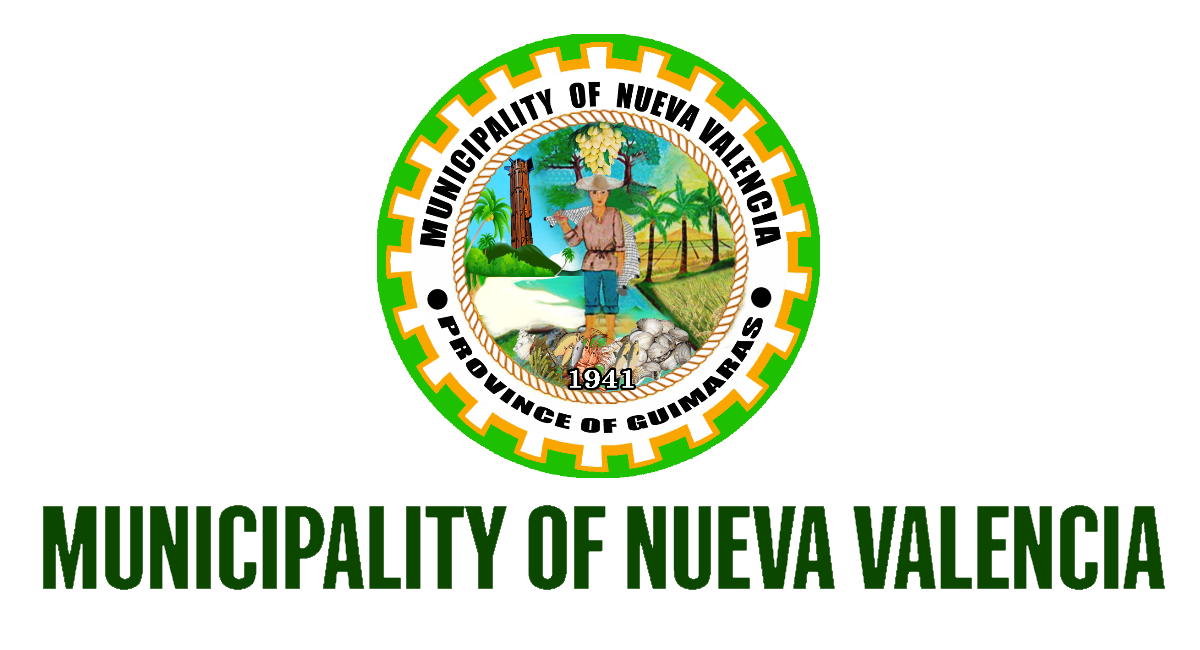
- Flag

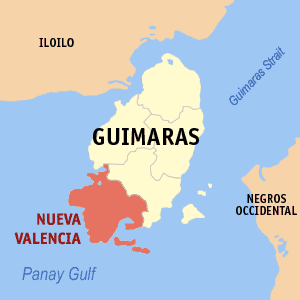
- Map of Guimaras with Nueva Valencia highlighted
- Interactive map of Nueva Valencia
- Location within the Philippines
- Coordinates: 10°31′34″N 122°32′24″E
- Country: Philippines
- Region: Western Visayas
- Province: Guimaras
- District: Lone district
- Founded: January 1, 1941
- Barangays: 22 (see Barangays)

Government
  - Type: Sangguniang Bayan
  - Mayor: Emmanuel D. Galila (NUP)
  - Vice Mayor: Ma. Luz G. Gambalan (NUP)
  - Representative: JC Rahman Nava (NUP)
  - Municipal Council: Members: Jun Cesar E. Galila; Marilou S. Delumpa; Jason E. Javier; Antonio D. Delumpa; Rofel G. Geonanga; Rex G. Geraldoy; Felix G. Servando; Primitivo T. Gallego
  - Electorate: 27,118 voters (2025)

Area
  - Total: 137.12 km^{2} (52.94 sq mi)
- Elevation: 13 m (43 ft)
- Highest elevation: 1,064 m (3,491 ft)
- Lowest elevation: 0 m (0 ft)

Population (2024 census)
  - Total: 43,822
  - Density: 319.59/km^{2} (827.73/sq mi)
  - Households: 10,903

Economy
  - Income class: 2nd municipal income class
  - Poverty incidence: 11.73% (2023)
  - Revenue: ₱ 202.7 million (2024)
  - Assets: ₱ 628.2 million (2024)
  - Expenditure: ₱ 110.4 million (2024)
  - Liabilities: ₱ 168.1 million (2024)

Service provider
  - Electricity: Guimaras Electric Cooperative (GUIMELCO)
- Time zone: UTC+8 (PST)
- ZIP code: 5046
- PSGC: 0607903000
- IDD : area code: +63 (0)33
- Native languages: Hiligaynon; Ati; Tagalog
- Website: nuevavalencia.gov.ph

Nueva Valencia, officially the Municipality of Nueva Valencia (Hiligaynon: Banwa sang Nueva Valencia; Tagalog: Bayan ng Nueva Valencia), is a municipality in the province of Guimaras, Philippines. According to the 2024 census, it has a population of 43,822 people.

The town is known for its numerous white sand beaches, including the popular Alubihod Beach and Taklong Island Beach, as well as islets such as the islands of Guiwanon (or Guiuanon), Panobolon, among others.

== Etymology ==
Nueva Valencia derives its name from the Spanish period, when the area near present-day Guisi was selected as the site for a lighthouse to guide ships through the Iloilo Strait. The nearby settlement was initially called Santa Ana, after the patron saint believed to provide protection from storms. As the population increased, Spanish authorities established the town and named it Valencia, after a town in Spain with the same patron saint. When the municipal seat later moved to Barrio Igang, the town was renamed Nueva Valencia, meaning “New Valencia,” while the former center became a barrio known as Santa Ana.

== History ==
It was the site of the Guimaras oil spill in August 2006, when the oil tanker MT Solar 1 sank a few kilometers from Nueva Valencia.

Also, the town of Nueva Valencia is a part of the Metro Iloilo–Guimaras area, centered on Iloilo City.

== Geography ==
Nueva Valencia is 13 kilometres (8.1 mi) from Jordan.

=== Barangays ===
Nueva Valencia is politically subdivided into 22 barangays. Each barangay consists of puroks and some have sitios.

- Cabalagnan
- Calaya
- Canhawan
- Concordia Sur
- Dolores
- Guiwanon
- Igang
- Igdarapdap
- La Paz
- Lanipe
- Lucmayan
- Magamay
- Napandong
- Oracon Sur
- Pandaraonan
- Panobolon
- Poblacion
- Salvacion
- San Antonio
- San Roque
- Santo Domingo
- Tando

=== Climate ===
Climate data for Nueva Valencia, Guimaras
Month	Jan	Feb	Mar	Apr	May	Jun	Jul	Aug	Sep	Oct	Nov	Dec	Year
Mean daily maximum °C (°F)	30 (86)	31 (88)	32 (90)	33 (91)	32 (90)	30 (86)	29 (84)	29 (84)	28 (82)	29 (84)	30 (86)	30 (86)	30 (86)
Mean daily minimum °C (°F)	21 (70)	21 (70)	22 (72)	23 (73)	24 (75)	24 (75)	24 (75)	24 (75)	24 (75)	24 (75)	23 (73)	22 (72)	23 (73)
Average precipitation mm (inches)	19 (0.7)	17 (0.7)	26 (1.0)	37 (1.5)	119 (4.7)	191 (7.5)	258 (10.2)	260 (10.2)	248 (9.8)	196 (7.7)	97 (3.8)	39 (1.5)	1,507 (59.3)
Average rainy days	7.2	5.2	8.3	11.9	22.3	26.5	28.3	28.2	27.3	26.4	18.7	11.8	222.1
Source: Meteoblue

== Demographics ==
Nueva Valencia Municipal Hall

Population census of Nueva Valencia
Year	Pop.	±% p.a.
1903	3,459	—
1948	9,472	+2.26%
1960	14,398	+3.55%
1970	19,306	+2.97%
1975	21,887	+2.55%
1980	24,447	+2.24%
1990	30,703	+2.31%
1995	27,158	−2.27%
2000	30,716	+2.67%
2007	35,026	+1.83%
2010	37,852	+2.86%
2015	39,810	+0.97%
2020	42,771	+1.52%
2024	43,822	+0.58%
Source: Philippine Statistics Authority

In the 2024 census, the population of Nueva Valencia was 43,822 people, with a density of 320 inhabitants per square kilometre or 830 inhabitants per square mile.

== Economy ==
Poverty incidence of Nueva Valencia (%)

Source: Philippine Statistics Authority

== Tourism ==
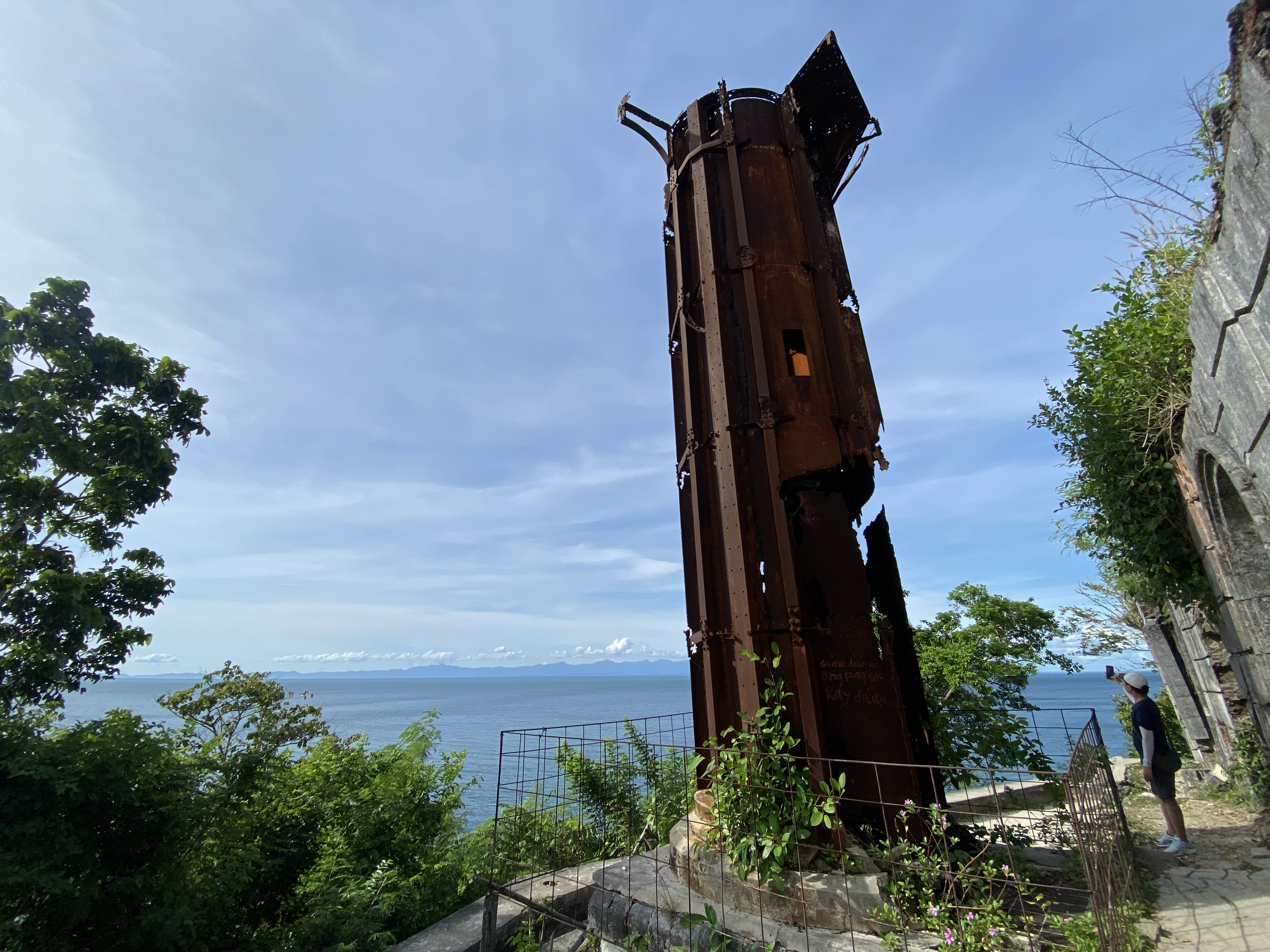
Ruins of the Guisi Lighthouse at Barangay Dolores

The Guisi Lighthouse, considered the second oldest lighthouse in the Philippines, is also one of the attractions in the municipality.

== Education ==
There are two schools district offices which govern all educational institutions within the municipality. They oversee the management and operations of all private and public, from primary to secondary schools. These are the:

- Nueva Valencia North Schools District
- Nueva Valencia South Schools District

Primary and elementary schools

- Bahandi Kiddy School
- Cabalagnan Elementary School
- Calaya Elementary School
- Concordia Elementary School
- Dolores Elementary School
- Guiwanon Elementary School
- Holy Rosary Academy
- Igang Elementary School
- Igdarapdap Elementary School
- La Paz Elementary School
- Lanipe Elementary School
- Lucmayan Elementary School
- Magamay Elementary School
- Napandong Elementary School
- Nueva Valencia Central School
- Oracon Elementary School
- Paaralan ng Buhay ng Canhawan
- Paaralan ng Buhay ng Don Domingo Granada
- Paaralan ng Buhay ng La Orca
- Paaralan ng Buhay ng Pandaraonan
- Paaralan ng Buhay ng Tando
- Paaralan ng Buhay ng Taras
- Panobolon Primary School
- Rock Learning School
- Salvacion Central School
- San Antonio Elementary School
- San Roque Elementary School
- Unisan Multigrade School

Secondary schools

- Cabalagnan National High School
- Calaya National High School
- Nueva Valencia National High School
- Salvacion National High School
- Simeon J. Jabasa National High School
