= List of ship types =

This is a list of historical ship types, which includes any classification of ship that has ever been used, excluding smaller vessels considered to be boats. The classifications are not all mutually exclusive; a vessel may be both a full-rigged ship by description, and a collier or frigate by function.

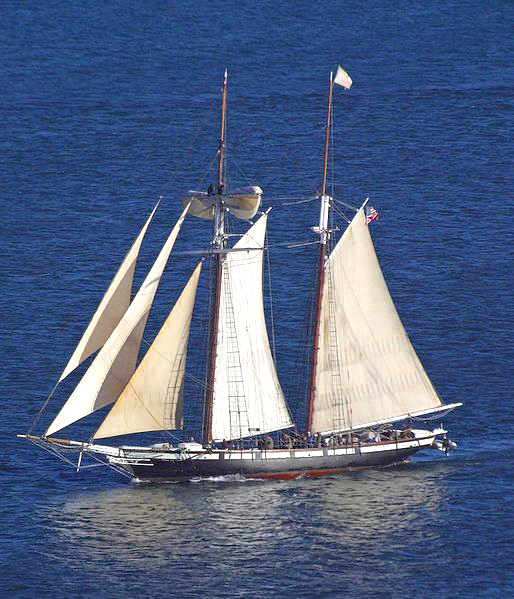
A two-masted schooner

Aircraft carrier
Naval vessel able to launch and retrieve airplanes
Amphibious warfare ship
vessels of various sizes for landing personnel and vehicles
Aviso
(Spanish, French or Portuguese) Originally a dispatch boat, later applied to ships equivalent to the Royal Navy sloop
Barque
A sailing vessel with three or more masts, fore-and-aft rigged on only the aftermost
Barquentine
A sailing vessel with three or more masts, square-rigged only on the foremast
Battlecruiser
A heavily armed cruiser similar to a battleship but possessing less armor
Battleship
A large, heavily armored and heavily gunned powered warship
Bilander
A ship or brig with a lug-rigged mizzen sail
Bireme
An ancient vessel, propelled by two banks of oars
Birlinn
(Scots) Clinker-built vessel, single-masted with a square sail also capable of being rowed
Blockade runner
A ship whose current business is to slip past a blockade
Boita
A cargo vessel used for trade between Eastern India and Indochina
Brig
A two-masted, square-rigged vessel
Brigantine
A two-masted vessel, square-rigged on the foremast and fore-and-aft rigged on the main
Caravel
(Portuguese) A much smaller, two, sometimes three-masted ship
Carrack
Three or four masted ship, square-rigged forward, lateen-rigged aft; 14th–16th century successor to the cog
Cartel
A small boat used to negotiate between enemies
Catamaran
A ship (or boat) with two parallel hulls of equal size
Catboat
A sailing vessel characterized by a single mast carried well forward (i.e., near the bow of the boat)
Clipper
A fast multiple-masted sailing ship, generally used by merchants because of their speed capabilities
Coastal defense ship
A vessel built for coastal defense
Cog
Plank built, one mast, square rigged, 12th to 14th century, superseded the longship
Collier
A vessel designed for the coal trade
Corvette
A small, maneuverable, lightly armed warship, generally smaller than a frigate
Cruise ship
A ship used for carrying passengers on pleasure cruises
Cruiser
A warship that is generally larger than a destroyer, but smaller than a battleship
Destroyer
A warship mainly used for anti-submarine warfare
Destroyer escort
A lighter destroyer intended primarily for escort duties
Dhow
traditional sailing vessels with one or more masts with settee or sometimes lateen sails, used in the Red Sea and Indian Ocean region
Dreadnought
An early twentieth century type of battleship characterized by an "all big gun" armament

Pre-dreadnought
Battleships predating the dreadnought, characterized by having an offensive battery of mixed calibers

Drekar
A Viking longship with sails and oars
Dromons
Ancient precursors to galleys
East Indiaman
An armed merchantman belonging to one of the East India companies
Felucca
A traditional Arab type of sailing vessel
Fire ship
A vessel of any sort, set on fire and sent forth to cause consternation and destruction, rendering an enemy vulnerable
Floating fuel station
A fuel dispensing vessel
Fluyt
A Dutch-made vessel from the Golden Age of Sail, with multiple decks and two or three square-rigged masts, usually used for merchant purposes

Flüte (French
en flûte, "as a fluyt"): A sailing warship used as a transport, with a reduced armament

Frigate
A term used for warships of many sizes and roles over the past few centuries
Galleass
A sailing and rowing warship, equally well suited to sailing and rowing
Galleon
A sixteenth century sailing warship
Galley
A warship propelled by oars with a sail for use in a favourable wind
Galliot
Name refers to several types of sailing vessel, usually two-masted
Gunboat
Various small armed vessels, originally sail and later powered
Hydrofoil
A ship whose hull is fitted underneath with shaped vanes (foils) which lift the hull out of the water at speed.
Ironclad
A wooden warship with external iron plating
Junk
A Chinese sailing ship that widely used in ancient far east and South China sea which includes many variants such as Fu Ship, Kwong Ship.
Karve
A small type of Viking longship
Ketch
A two-masted, fore-and-aft rigged sailing boat with a mizzenmast stepped forward of the rudder and smaller than its foremast.
Knarr
A large type of Viking cargo ship, fit for Atlantic crossings
Lorcha
A sailing ship with mixed Chinese (rig) and western design (hull) that used since 16th century in far east.
Landing Ship, Tank
Military ship for landing troops and vehicles
Liberty ship

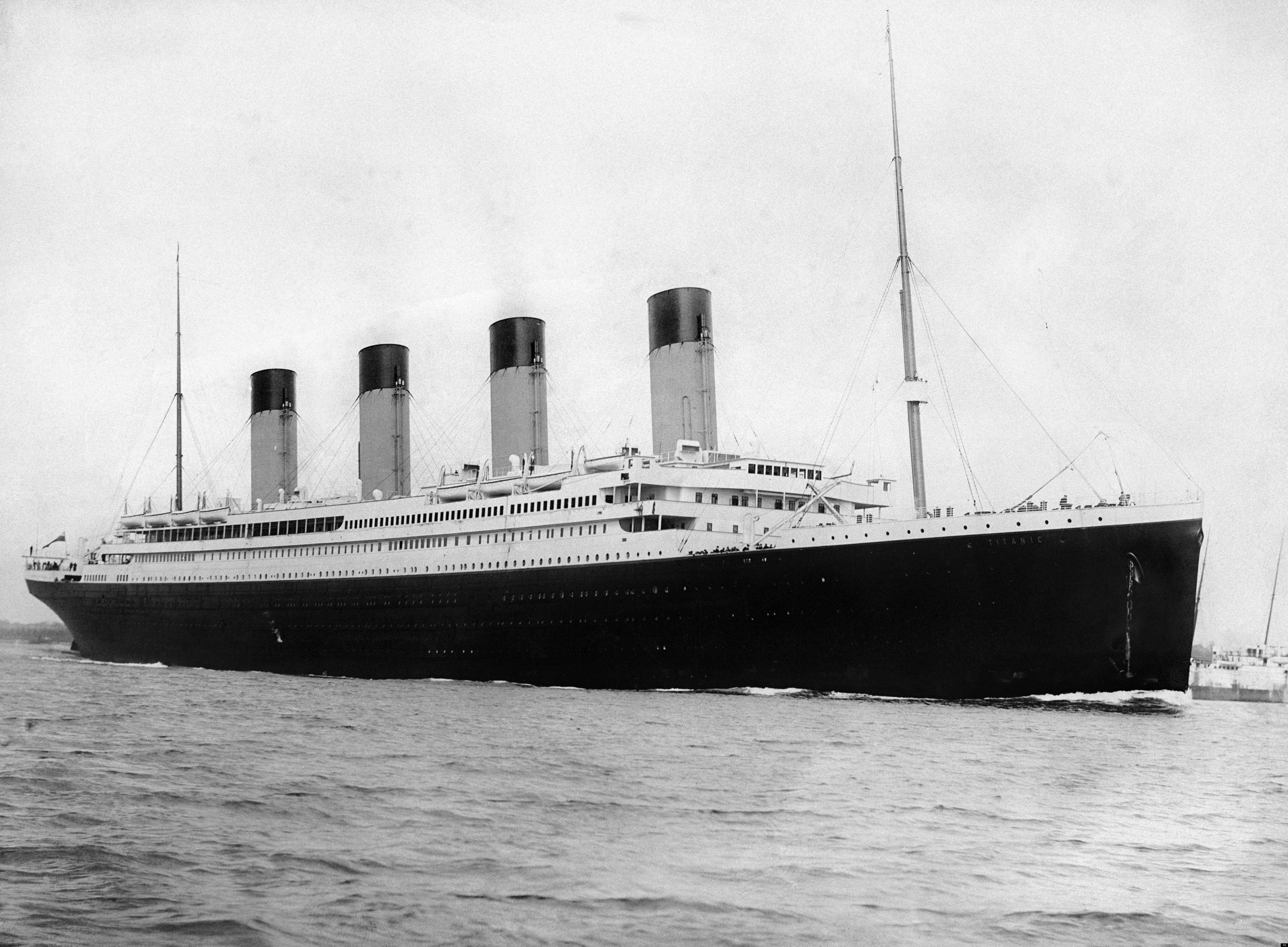
The RMS Titanic was the most famous ocean liner in the world

A type of welded American merchant ship of the late Second World War period, designed for rapid construction in large quantity
Liner or ocean liner
A large passenger ship, usually running on a regular schedule. The same vessel may be used as a cruise ship
Littoral combat ship (LCS)
US warship intermediate in size between a corvette and a frigate, similar to a sloop
Longship
A Viking raiding ship
Man-of-war
A heavily armed sailing warship
Merchantman
A trading vessel

Armed merchantman
A trading vessel possessing weapons for self-defense
Merchant aircraft carrier
A merchant vessel capable of launching aircraft
Merchant raider
An armed vessel used for raiding disguised as a merchant vessel

Mistico
Small, fast two or three-masted Mediterranean sailing vessel
Monitor
A small, very heavily gunned warship with shallow draft, designed for coastal operations
Motor ship or motor vessel
A vessel powered by a non-steam engine, typically diesel. Ship prefix MS or MV
Nef
A large medieval sailing ship
Oil Tanker
A large ship designed for the bulk transport of oil or its products.
Packet
A sailing ship that carried mail, passengers and freight
Paddle steamer
A steam-propelled, paddle-driven vessel
Pantserschepen (Dutch) or Pansarskepp (Swedish)
Types of ironclad, heavy gunboats designed for coastal or colonial service
Penteconter
An ancient warship propelled by 50 oars, 25 on each side
Pinisi (or Phinisi)
A fast, two-masted ship traditionally used by the Bugis of Eastern Indonesia
Pinnace
Although usually defined as a type of tender carried by another ship, it was also a term in the 16th century for a ship up to 50 or more tons capable of trans-oceanic voyages. Referenced in the 16th century tome "The Strange Adventures of Andrew Battell..." who sailed from England to explore Africa.
Polyreme
A generic modern term for ancient warships propelled by two or three banks of oarsmen, with three or more files of men per side, sometimes with more than one man per oar, and named after the number of files. Polyremes comprise the trireme (3 files), quadrireme, quinquereme, hexareme or sexireme (probably a trireme with two rowers per oar), septireme, octeres, enneres, deceres, and larger polyremes up to a "forty", with 40 files of oarsmen, 130m long, carrying 7,250 rowers, other crew, and marines
Pram (ship)
A pram or pramm is a type of shallow-draught flat-bottomed ship. There is also a type of boat called Pram
Q-ship
A heavily armed vessel disguised as a merchantman to lure submarines into attacking
Quinquereme
An ancient warship propelled by three banks of oars; respectively the top, middle, and lower banks had two, two, and one (i.e., 5 total) men per oar
Royal Mail Ship
Any ship carrying mail for the British Royal Mail, allocated ship prefix RMS while doing so. Typically a fast liner carrying passengers.
Schooner
A fore and aft-rigged vessel with two or more masts of which the foremast is shorter than the main
Settee
Single-decked, single or double-masted Mediterranean cargo vessel carrying a settee sail
Shallop
A large, heavily built, sixteenth-century boat which is fore-and-aft rigged; more recently a poetically frail open boat
Ship or full-rigged ship
Historically a sailing vessel with three or more full-rigged masts. "Ship" is now used for any large watercraft
Ship of the line [of battle]
A sailing warship generally of first, second or third rate, i.e., with 64 or more guns; until the mid eighteenth century fourth rates (50-60 guns) also served in the line of battle. Succeeded by the powered battleship
Slave ship
A cargo vessel specially converted to transport slaves
Sloop
A fore-and-aft rigged sailing vessel with a single mast; later a powered warship intermediate in size between a corvette and a frigate
Small-waterplane-area twin hull (SWATH)
A modern design built for stability in rough seas; predominantly used for research vessels
Snow
A small sailing ship, with a foremast, a mainmast and a trysail mast behind the main; sometimes armed as a warship with two to ten guns
Steamship
A ship propelled by a steam engine; includes steam frigates. Ship prefix SS for merchant vessels
Tartane or tartan
A single-masted ship used for fishing and coastal trading in the Mediterranean from the 17th to the late 19th century, usually rigged with a large lateen sail, and a fore-sail to the bowsprit.
Trabaccolo
A type of Mediterranean coastal sailing vessel
Tramp steamer
A steamer which takes on cargo when and where it can find it
Trireme
An ancient warship propelled by three banks of oars per side
Troopship
A ship used for transporting troops. Large ocean liners, fast enough to outrun warships, were often used for this purpose during wartime
Victory ship
Mass-produced cargo ship of the Second World War as a successor to the Liberty ship
Xebec
A Mediterranean sailing ship, typically three-masted, lateen-rigged and powered also by oars, with a characteristic overhanging bow and stern
Yacht
A recreational boat or ship, sail or powered
Yawl
A yawl is a two masted, fore and aft rigged sailing vessel with the mizzen mast positioned abaft (behind) the rudder stock

== See also ==
- Lists of watercraft types
