= Arevalo, Iloilo City =

District of Iloilo City, Philippines

Arevalo La Villa Rica de Arévalo
- District of Iloilo City
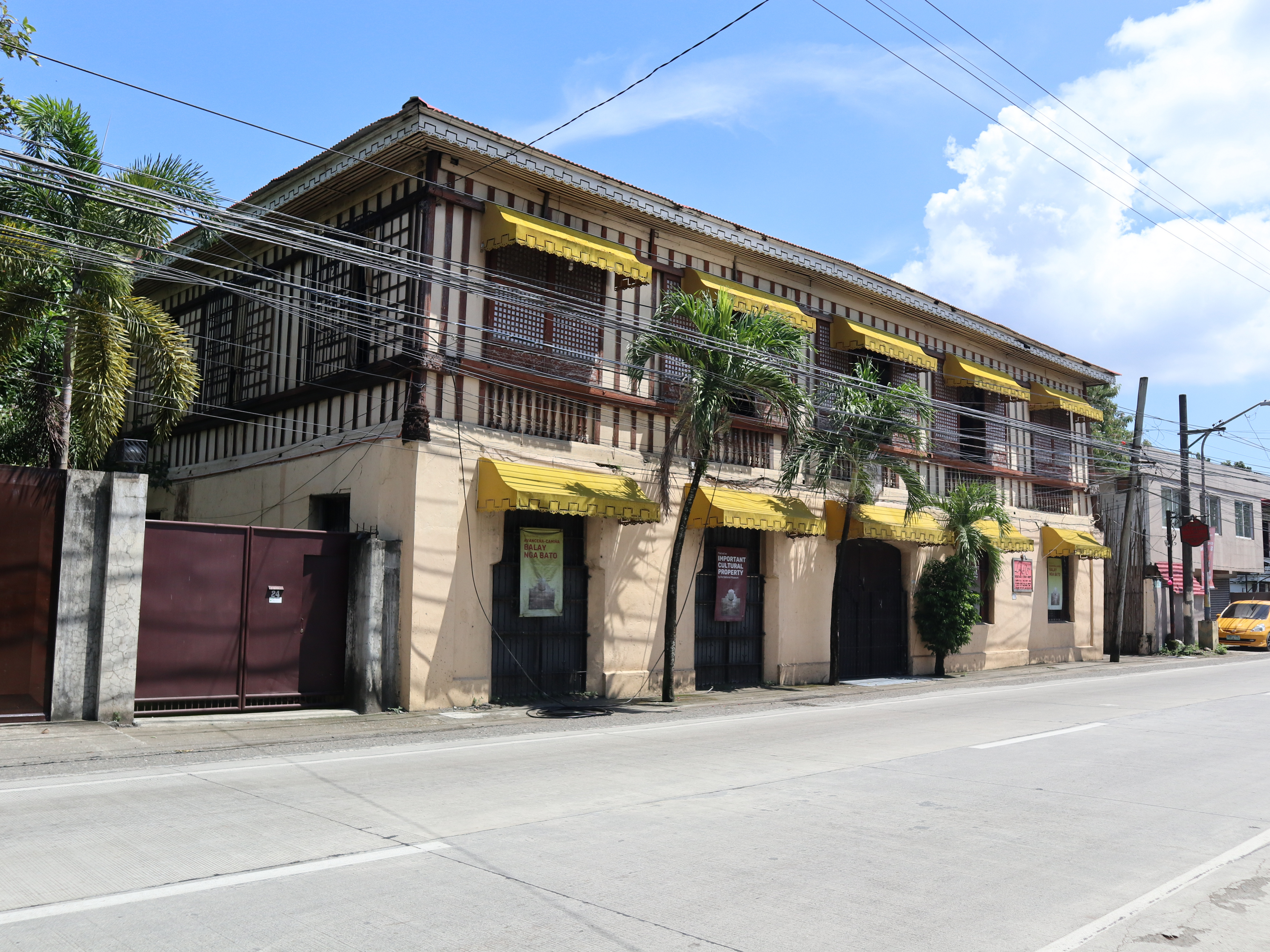
- Camiña Balay Nga Bato
- Nickname: Flower Capital of Iloilo
- Interactive map of Arevalo
- Location in the Philippines Arevalo (Philippines)
- Coordinates: 10°41′09″N 122°30′42″E
- Country: Philippines
- Region: Western Visayas (Region VI)
- Province: Iloilo (geographically only)
- City: Iloilo City
- Congressional District: Lone district of Iloilo City
- Founded: 1566 (Settlement); 1581 (Formally established)
- Merged into city: August 25, 1937
- Founded by: Gonzalo Ronquillo de Peñalosa
- Barangays: 13 (see Barangays)

Government
  - District ABC President: Rico Francis Acap

Area
  - Total: 7.58 km^{2} (2.93 sq mi)

Population (2024 census)
  - Total: 57,265
  - Density: 7,550/km^{2} (19,600/sq mi)
- Demonym(s): Arevaleño; Villahanon
- Time zone: UTC+8 (Philippine Standard Time)
- ZIP code: 5000
- Area code: 33
- Festival(s): Paraw Regatta Festival – Third weekend of February
- Patron saint: Santo Niño de Arévalo
- Feast day: Third Sunday of January
- Native languages: Hiligaynon

Villa de Arevalo ([ˈbiʝa ðe aˈɾeβalo]; [ˈbiːljɐ dɛ ʔɐˌɾɛːbɐˈlo]), commonly known as simply Villa or Arevalo, is a district in Iloilo City, Philippines. It is the westernmost district of Iloilo City and shares its border with Oton to the west, in the province of Iloilo, on the island of Panay in the Western Visayas region. According to the 2024 census, it has a population of 57,265 people.

The district is known for its heritage and cultural landmarks, including the Camiña Balay nga Bato, a 19th-century heritage house, and Villa Beach, which features several resorts and popular local restaurants and bars.

Notable landmarks in Arevalo include the Archdiocesan Shrine of Santo Niño de Arevalo, which houses the Santo Niño de Arévalo, the third oldest Santo Niño (Infant Jesus) image in the Philippines. Arevalo is often referred to as the "Flower Capital of Iloilo" due to the abundance of potted plants, flowers, bouquets, and wreaths sold in the district. The district is also renowned for its firecrackers and fireworks.

== History ==
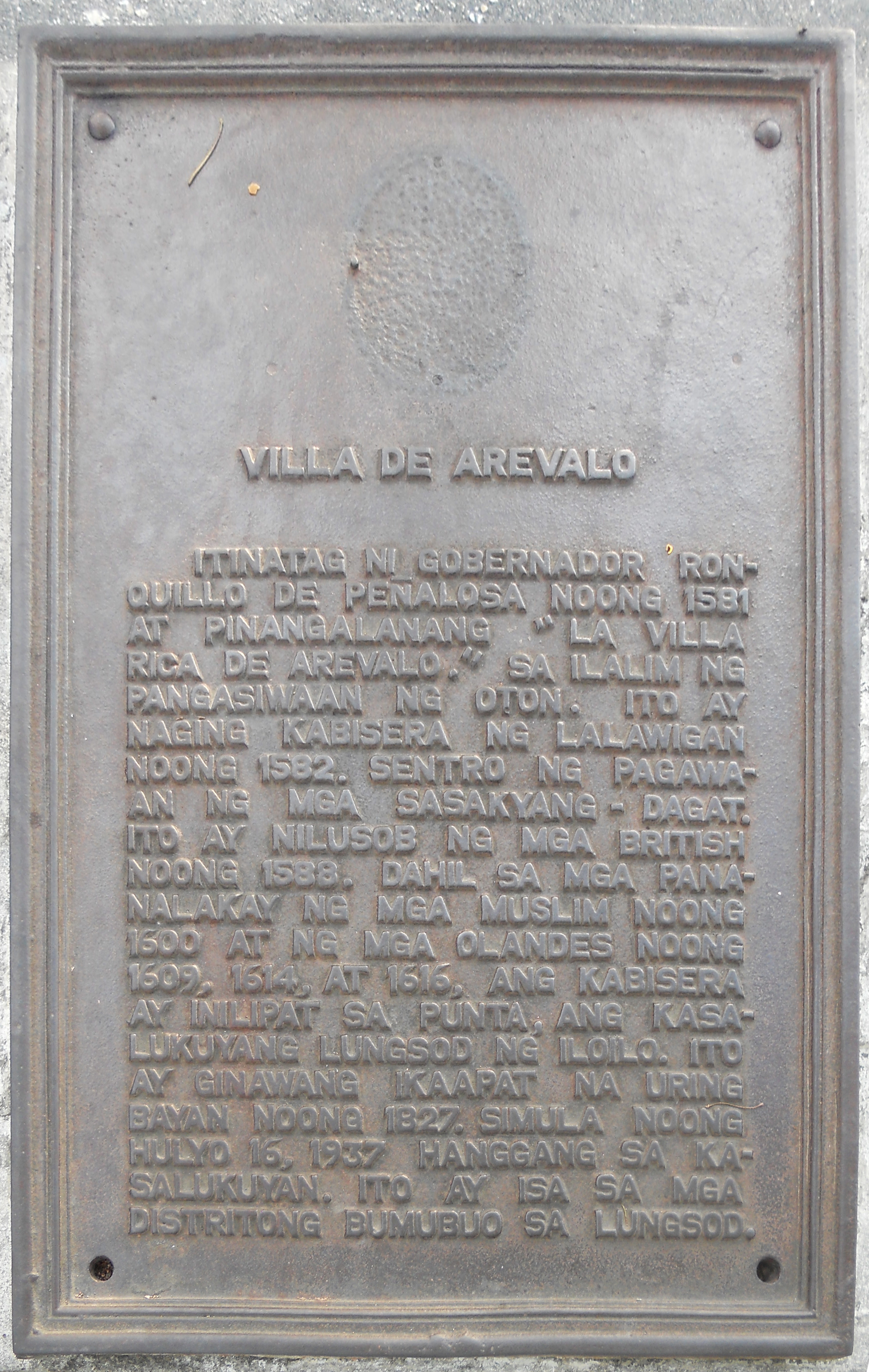
Villa de Arevalo historical marker

A Spanish settlement was established in 1566 when Spanish conquerors settled in the area between Villa de Arevalo and the neighboring town of Oton. Villa de Arevalo was formally founded as La Villa Rica de Arévalo by Gobernador Gonzalo Ronquillo de Peñalosa in 1581. The name Arévalo was derived from his hometown in Spain, making it one of the first places in the Philippines to be named in Spanish.

The initial population of Villa de Arevalo comprised 80 European colonists of pure Spanish descent who set up new families, It became the capital of the province's settlement in 1582. In 1586, it welcomed an additional 20 Spanish Households and the garrison was reinforced by 30 Spanish and/or Mexican soldiers. However, the town faced numerous challenges throughout its history. It was invaded by the British in 1588, followed by raids by Moro pirates in 1600, and further attacks by the Dutch in 1609, 1614, and 1616. These constant threats led to the relocation of the capital near the mouth of the Iloilo River, in La Punta, present-day location of Iloilo City Proper, in 1700. The Spanish and Mexican families in Arevalo were further reinforced by a consecutive number of 66, 50, 169, and then another 169 Mexican soldiers and colonists from Latin America during the years 1603, 1636, 1670, and 1672 who also married locals and made new families and spread out across the province of Iloilo. Later in the 1700s, Arevalo and Iloilo was home to 166 Spanish Filipino families and 29,723 native families the Mexican Filipinos who were larger in number than the Spanish Filipinos, where often uncounted though; as both Filipinos and Mexicans were considered native "Indios" and equivalent in the census, despite the Mexicans also possessing partial Spanish ancestry.

On July 16, 1937, Villa de Arevalo, along with the towns of Mandurriao, La Paz, and Molo, was legally annexed into Iloilo City, which was formally inaugurated on August 25, 1937.

== Geography ==
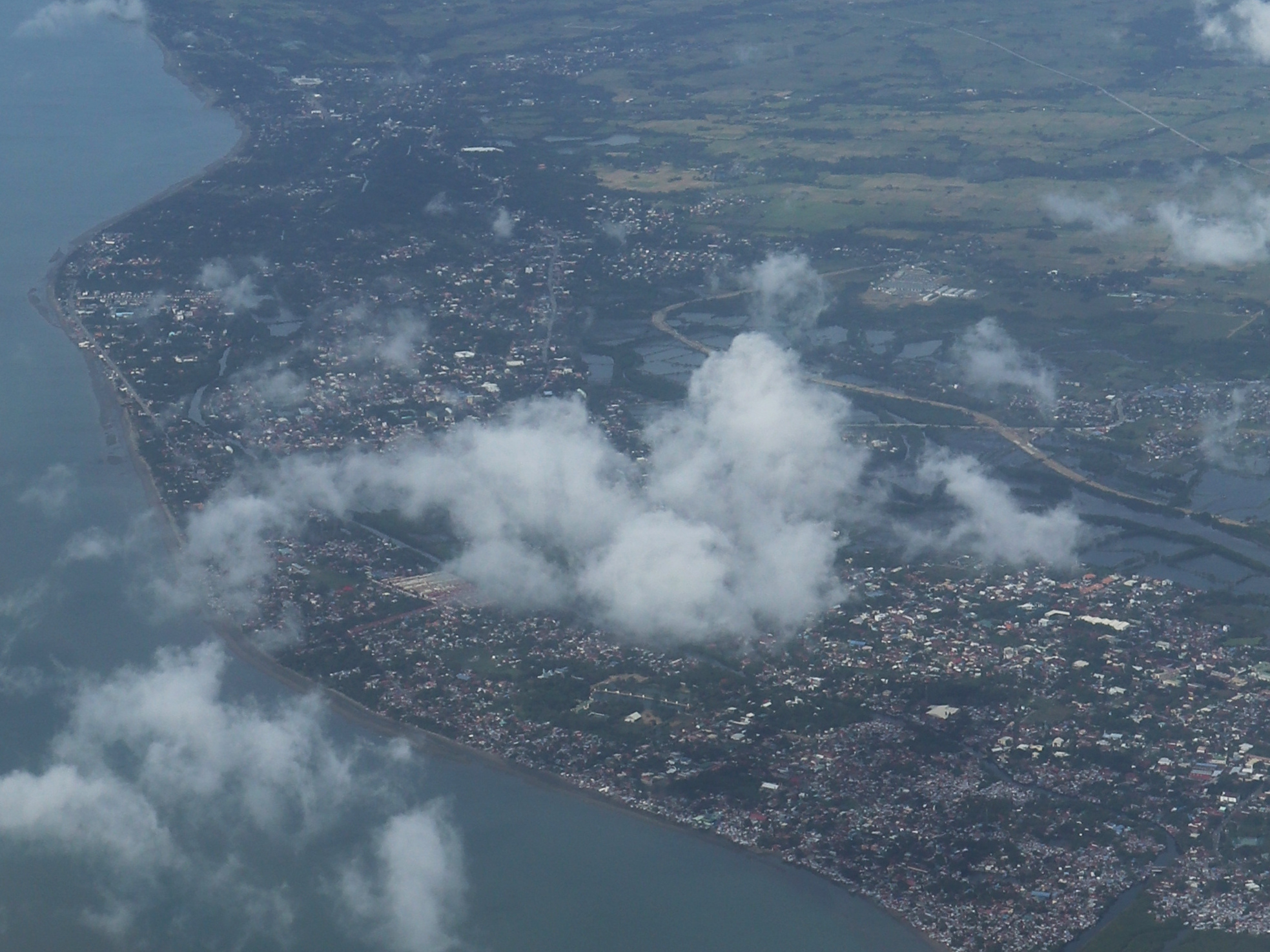
Arevalo aerial view

Arevalo is the furthest district to the west in Iloilo City. It is located 6.29 kilometres (3.91 mi) away from Iloilo City Proper. It shares its borders with the districts of Molo to the east, Mandurriao to the northeast, and the municipality of Oton to the north and west. To the south, the Iloilo Strait and Villa Beach provide natural boundaries. Traversing the district are the rivers of Iloilo and Batiano.

=== Barangays ===
The district of Arevalo has a total of 13 barangays.

- Bonifacio
- Calaparan
- Dulonan
- Mohon
- Quezon
- San José
- Santa Cruz
- Santa Filomina
- Santo Domingo
- Santo Niño Norte
- Santo Niño Sur
- Sooc
- Yulo Drive

== Education ==
- Melchor L. Nava National High School, named after Melchor Nava the former barangay captain of Calaparan.
- Ramon Avanceña National High School, named after Ramon Avanceña the former Chief Justice.
- John B. Lacson Foundation Maritime University-Arevalo campus, formerly known as Iloilo Maritime Academy.

== Culture ==
=== Archdiocesan Shrine of Santo Niño de Arevalo ===
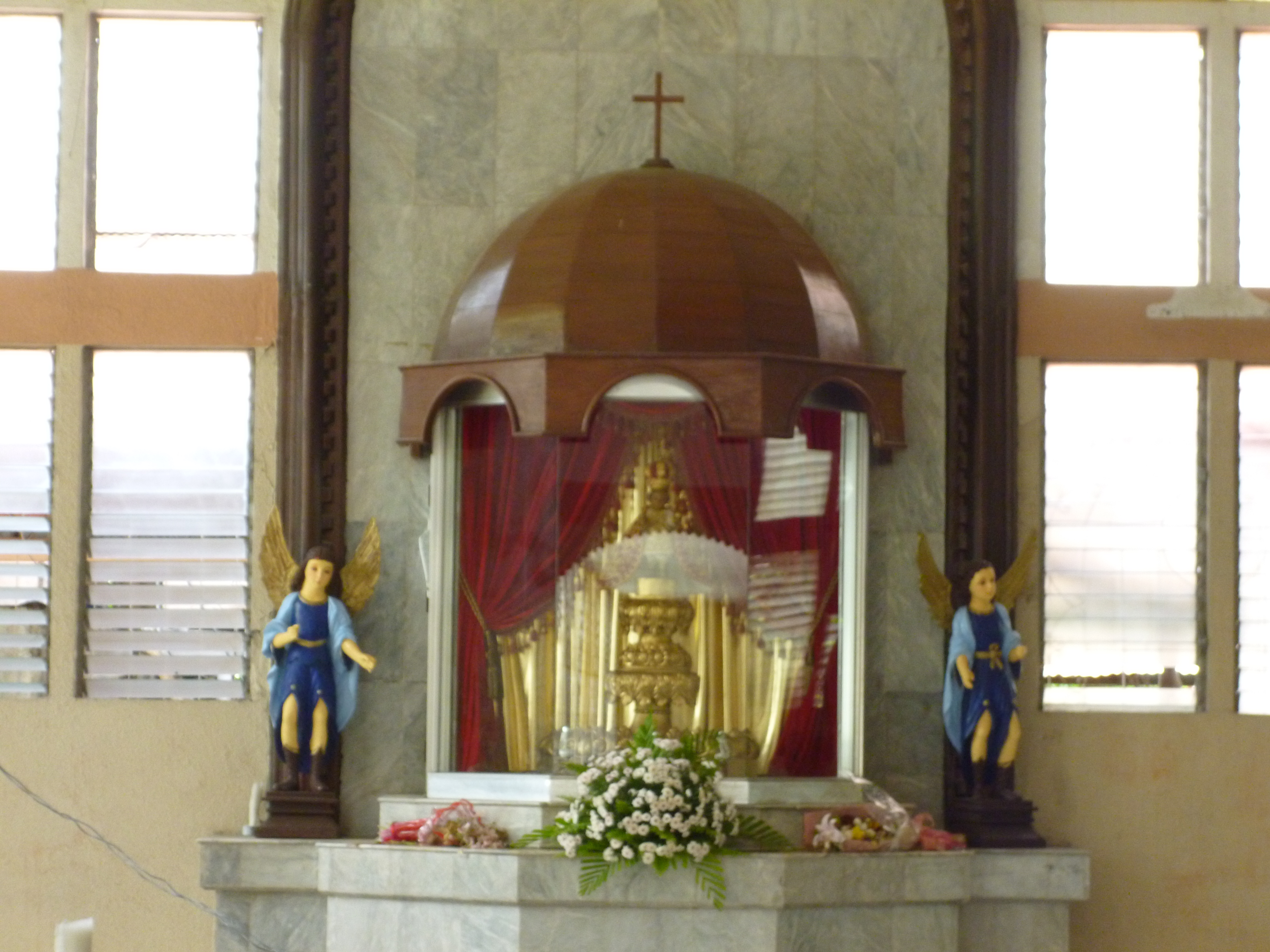
Santo Niño de Arévalo, third oldest Holy Child image in the Philippines.

The district's parish, the Santo Niño de Arevalo Parish, is home to the Santo Niño de Arévalo, third oldest Santo Niño figure in the Philippines. The church, located on Arevalo Plaza, was built in such a way that when seen from above it is shaped like a cross. Adjacent to the church is the Arevalo Convent, a heritage building in a Spanish colonial design. Residing parish priest is Rev. Fr. Jose Gerardo Classico Nufable.

=== Arevalo Town Fiesta ===
In January, Arevalo celebrates its town fiesta in honor of the Santo Niño. The festivities take place during the month of January, Fiesta day is held every 3rd Sunday of January. During Fiesta Day households open their doors and prepare food for fiesta goers, friends, visitors, and distant relatives. A fireworks display contest is one of the highlights of the celebration held on the night of the town fiesta.

=== Paraw Regatta Festival ===
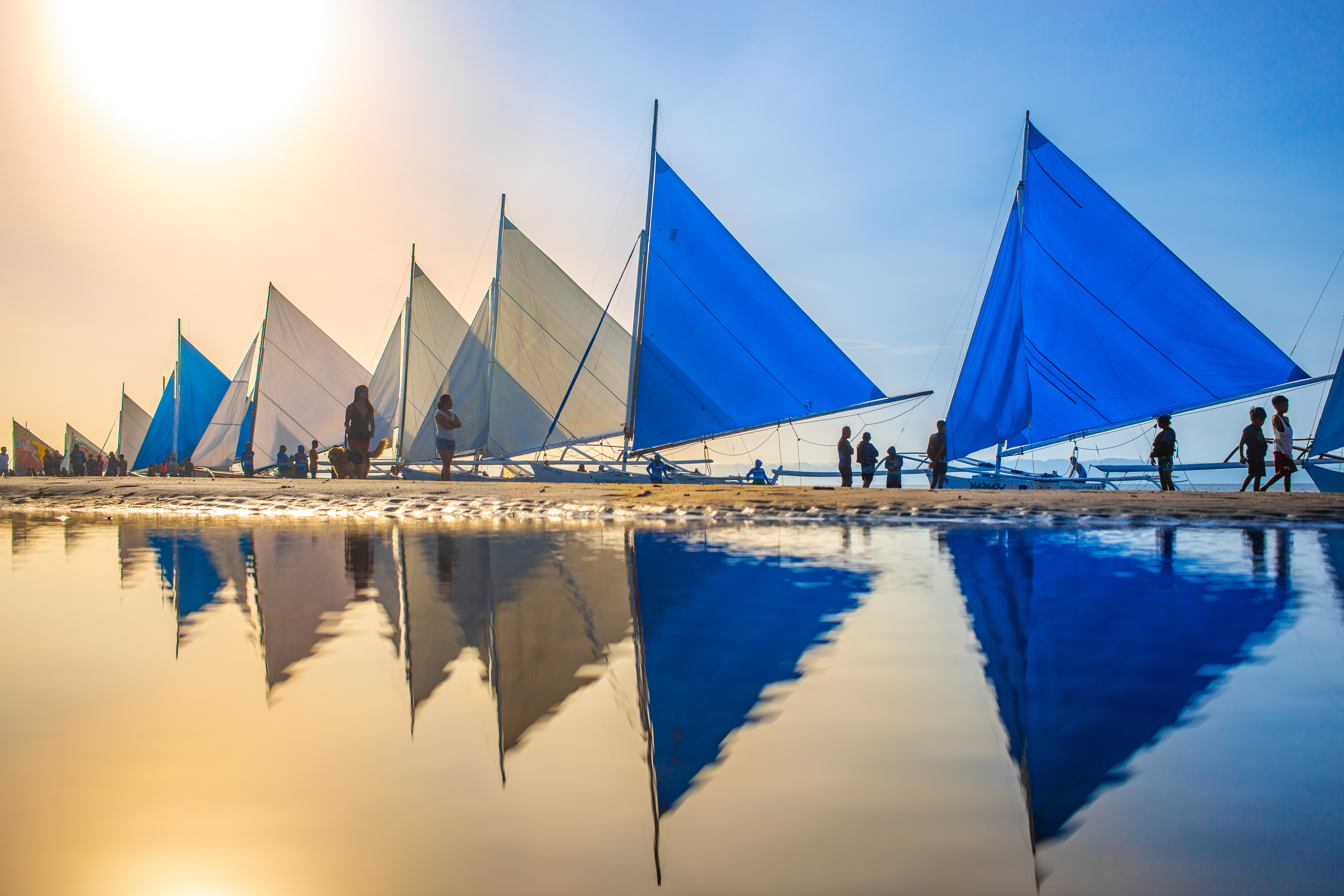
Villa Beach, during the Paraw Regatta Festival

Arevalo hosts the annual Paraw Regatta, which is the oldest traditional craft event in Asia, and the largest sailing event in the Philippines. A paraw is a Filipino double-outrigger sailboat much like a pump boat which was used for transportation and fishing and still is in limited areas.

The main event is the paraw boat race along Iloilo Strait and also showcases Pinta Layag, a sail painting contest; Porma Balas, sand sculpting; Pintawo, a body painting contest; Miss Paraw Regatta, a local beauty pageant; Samba De Regatta, music & Mardi Gras contest; Luces by the Sea, a pyrotechnic exhibition; beach volleyball; and photo competition.

== Transportation ==
Transportation is mainly by jeepney which serves the district to the Iloilo City Proper. Metered taxi cabs also serve the traveling public. Tricycles and trisikads operate within the district. The Don Benito Acap Southern Iloilo Line Jeepney Terminal (Mohon Terminal) in the district serves the routes to and from southern Iloilo towns and the province of Antique.

== See also ==
- Santo Niño de Arévalo
- Paraw Regatta
- Villa Beach

Preceded by Oton	Capital of Iloilo; 1581–1700	Succeeded by Iloilo City
