= List of Philippine boats and ships =

The following types of boats and ships are native to the Philippines:

- Balangay
- Paraw
- Vinta
- Karakoa
- Bangka
- Falua

== Sources ==
- Clariza, Elena. "Research Guides: Philippines: Philippine Boats & Navigation". University of Hawaiʻi at Mānoa Library. Archived from the original on February 15, 2017.

== See also ==
- List of boat types
- Lists of watercraft types
