= Villa Beach =

Beach in Iloilo City, Philippines

Villa Beach Villa Baybay (Hiligaynon) Playa de Villa de Arevalo
- Beach
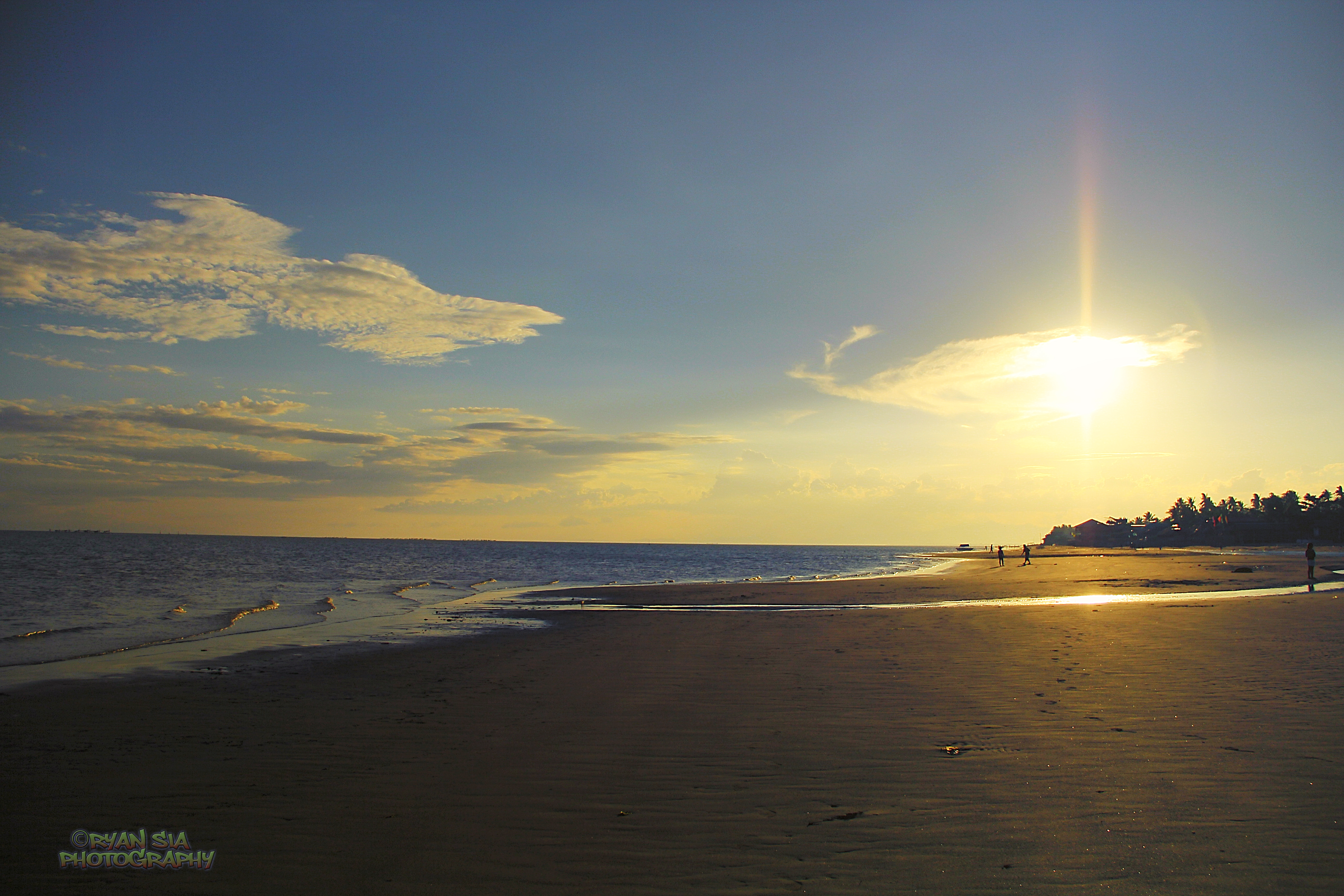
- Sunset at Villa Beach

- Coordinates: 10°40′47.2″N 122°30′36.8″E
- Location: Arevalo, Iloilo City, Philippines
- Offshore water bodies: Iloilo Strait

Villa Beach (Playa de Villa de Arevalo), also locally known as Villa Baybay, is an urban long gray sand beach located in the district of Villa de Arevalo on the southern coast of Iloilo City, Philippines.

Villa Beach is home to several popular local restaurants, including Tatoy's and Breakthrough Restaurant, known for serving seafood. The beach also home to many resorts.

== Paraw Regatta Festival ==
The Paraw Regatta Festival is an event held annually at Villa Beach, typically during February. This festival features a race among local seafarers on colorful sailboats called paraw, which navigate the straits between Guimaras Island and the City of Iloilo.
