= Parkland Legacy =

Floating fuel station in Vancouver, Canada

- Parkland Legacy moored in Coal Harbour

History
- Name: Chevron Legacy
- Operator: Chevron Corporation
- Port of registry: Vancouver, British Columbia
- Builder: Alaska Ship & Drydock, Inc
- Completed: 11 December 2009
- In service: January 2010
- Status: Purchased by Parkland Corporation in 2017

History
- Name: Parkland Legacy
- Operator: Parkland Corporation
- Port of registry: Vancouver, British Columbia
- Acquired: 2017
- Identification: ON: 834113
- Status: in service

General characteristics
- Type: Barge/floating fuel station
- Tonnage: 1,020 GT; 409 NT
- Length: 35.40 m (116 ft 2 in)
- Beam: 18.00 m (59 ft 1 in)
- Depth: 4.50 m (14 ft 9 in)
- Propulsion: None
- Crew: 1-3

Parkland Legacy, formerly known as Chevron Legacy, is a floating fuel station moored at Coal Harbour in Vancouver, British Columbia. It has fuel pumps with marine diesel and gasoline, a small convenience store, and a crew rest area. Unlike many other floating fuel stations, which pump fuel from an onshore fuel tank, Parkland Legacy stores its fuel on the barge itself.

== History ==
Chevron Legacy was constructed by Alaska Ship & Drydock, Inc, being completed in December 2009 and entering operation in January 2010. It replaced S.O.B.C No. 5, a similar Chevron branded floating fuel station which had been in operation since 1959. Chevron is the only marine fuel barge in Coal Harbour following the closure of an Esso barge in 2007.

In 2017 Parkland Corporation bought Chevron Canada's operations, which included 129 gas stations in British Columbia, one of which was Chevron Legacy. It was subsequently renamed to Parkland Legacy and retained the Chevron branding.

As of 2022, the barge has been incident free.
