= Paraw Regatta =

Annual maritime festival in Iloilo City, Philippines

Paraw Regatta Festival
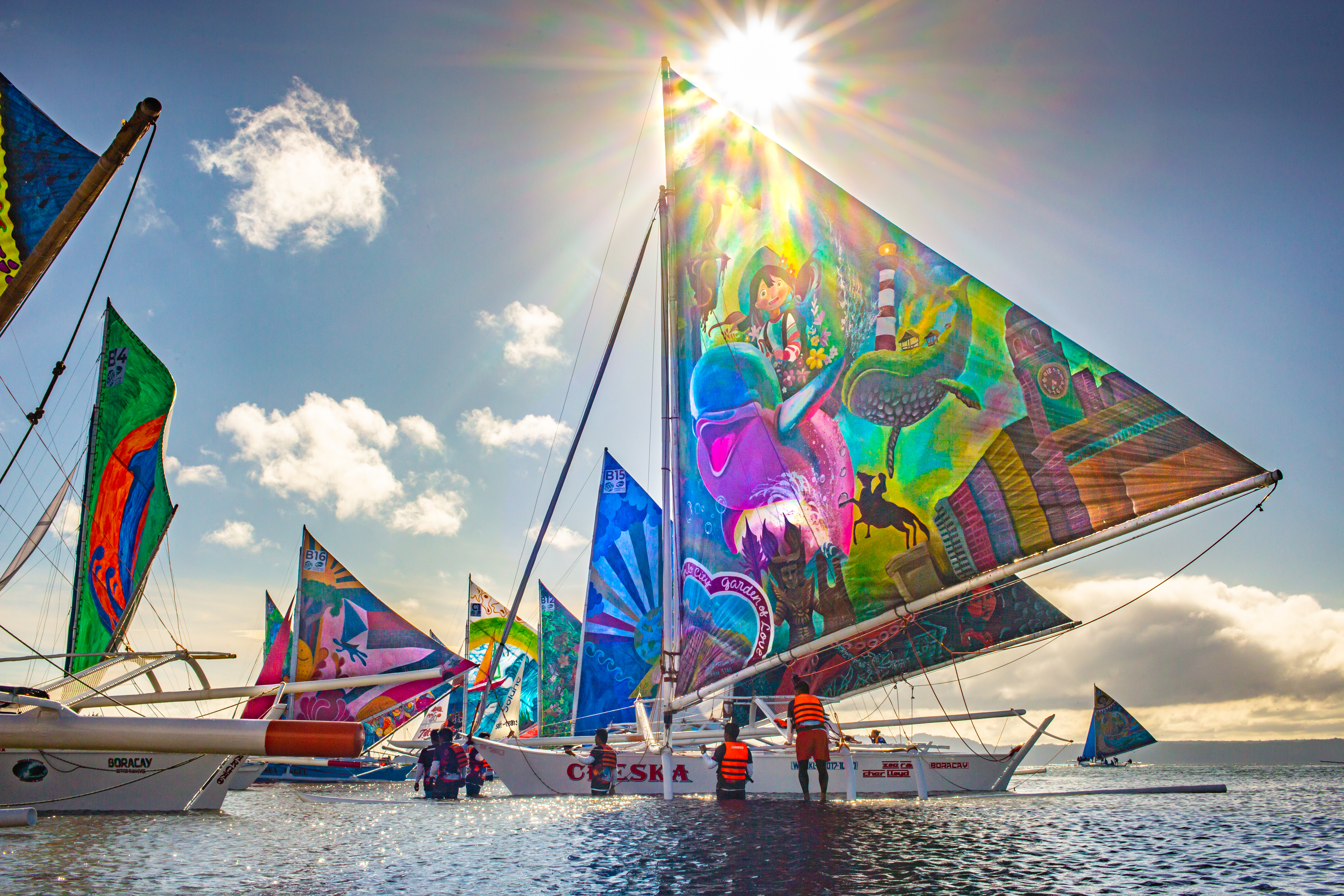
- Paraws during the sailing event
- Date: Third Weekend of February
- Frequency: annually
- Venue: Villa Beach
- Location: Arevalo, Iloilo City
- Country: Philippines
- Inaugurated: 1973; 53 years ago

The Paraw Regatta Festival, officially known as the Iloilo–Guimaras Paraw Regatta Festival, is an annual maritime festival held every third weekend of February in the Arevalo district of Iloilo City, Philippines, particularly along Villa Beach. Its main event is a traditional sailboat race across the Iloilo Strait, featuring the paraw, a native Visayan double-outrigger sailboat. The festival is regarded as the oldest traditional craft sailing event in Asia and the largest sailing event in the Philippines.

The festival is one of Iloilo City's major tourism events, alongside the Dinagyang Festival, Kasadyahan Festival, Chinese New Year celebrations, and the Jaro Fiesta.

== History ==
The first Paraw Regatta was organized in 1973 by local sailing enthusiasts and cultural advocates, with support from the Department of Tourism, in cooperation with the local governments of Iloilo City and the municipality of Oton, as well as the municipalities of Jordan and Buenavista in Guimaras. The event was initiated to preserve the traditional paraw and promote Iloilo's maritime heritage. At the time, the paraw, once widely used for fishing and inter-island transport, was gradually being replaced by motorized boats.

The inaugural race was a half-day sailing competition, primarily participated in by fishermen from coastal communities in Iloilo and Guimaras. Over the years, increasing public interest and support from local government units and tourism organizations transformed the event into a multi-day festival incorporating cultural, artistic, culinary, and various side events.

The Iloilo Festivals Foundation, Inc. (IFFI) currently manages and organizes the festival. They took over the responsibility from the Iloilo Paraw Regatta Foundation Inc. (IPRFI) in 2023 and also manage other major festivals in Iloilo, including the Dinagyang and Kasadyahan.

== Events ==
=== Main sailing event ===
The paraw race course covers approximately 30 kilometres (19 mi). It begins at Villa Beach in Arevalo, proceeds northward along the coast of mainland Panay, crosses the Iloilo Strait toward Guimaras Island, follows part of Guimaras' coastline, and then returns to Villa Beach as the finish point. The course is known for its challenging wind conditions and tidal patterns, testing the seamanship and sailing skills of participating crews.

==== Boat classes and classification ====
Participating paraws are classified based on waterline length and sail type. Boats are further grouped into painted and unpainted sail categories. Painted sails are traditionally adorned with colorful artistic designs, making them a distinctive visual feature of the festival.

Racing is divided into two primary classes:

- Paraws measuring 16 ft and below, which must be constructed using strictly traditional materials and methods
- Paraws measuring 16 ft 1 inch to 22 ft, where a broader range of construction materials is permitted

=== Side events ===
- Sinamba sa Regatta – A cultural dance and music competition performed during the festival that showcases choreography inspired by Iloilo's maritime traditions.
- Iloilo Paraw Slalom – A maneuvering race where participating paraws navigate a short, winding course near the shore to test sailing skills and handling ability.
- Pinta de Layag – A sail painting contest in which artists decorate paraw sails with creative designs before the main race.
- Pinta Tawo – A creative body-painting event that celebrates art and expression during the festival.
- Miniature Paraw Race – A race featuring small-scale model paraws competing in their own categories.
- Rowing and Paddling Competition – A side sporting event where participants compete in rowing or paddling races separate from the main sailboat race.
- Lechon Contest – A competition to showcase the best lechon or roasted pigs from different local establishments, judged on taste and presentation, with free tastings for the public.
- Governor's Cup Fishing Competition – A fishing competition typically organized as part of festival activities.
- Beach Football Tournament
- Beach Volleyball Tournament
- Beach Ultimate Frisbee Tournament

== Gallery ==
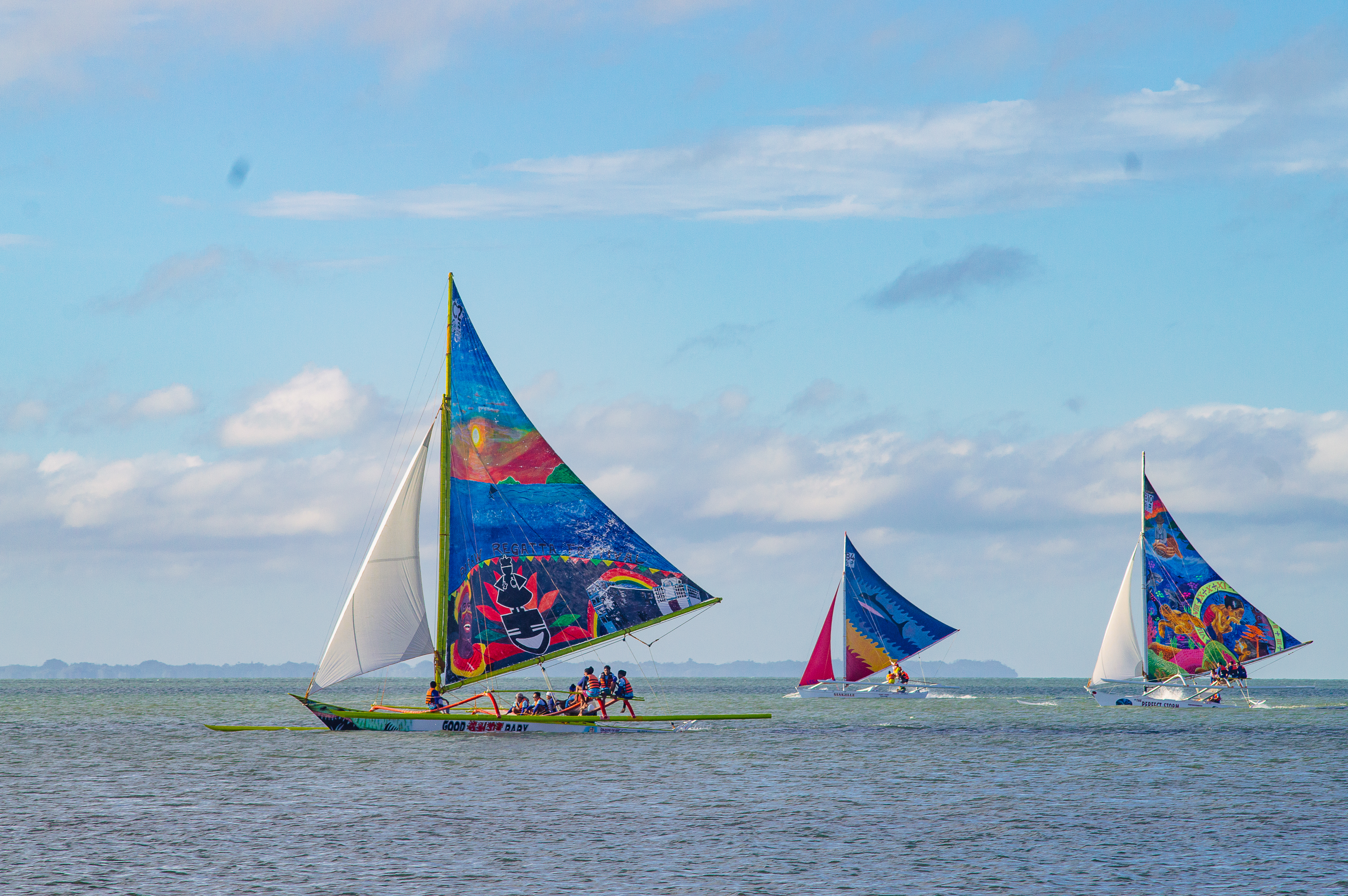
Painted paraws sailing across the Iloilo Strait

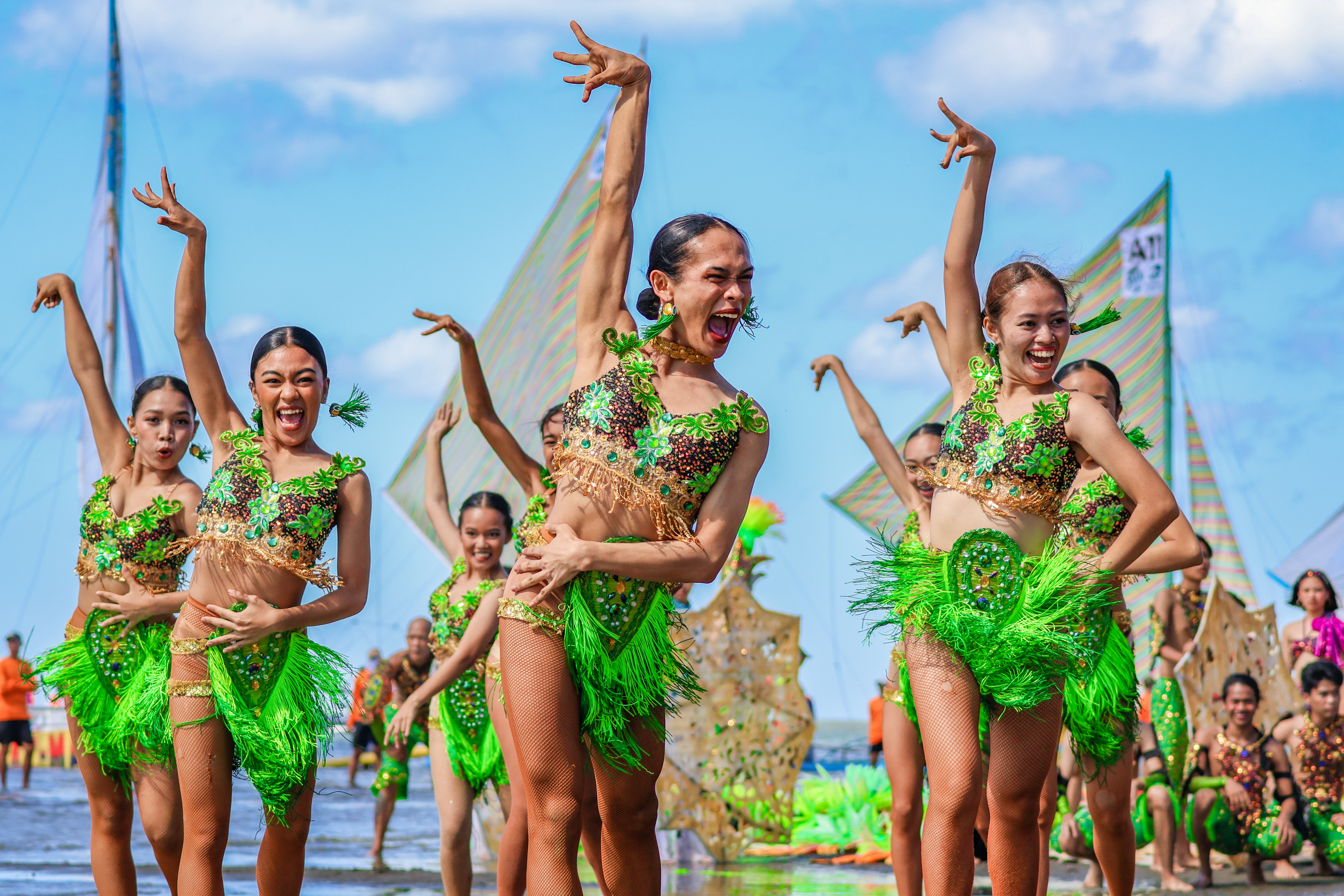
Daytime performance of Sinamba sa Regatta

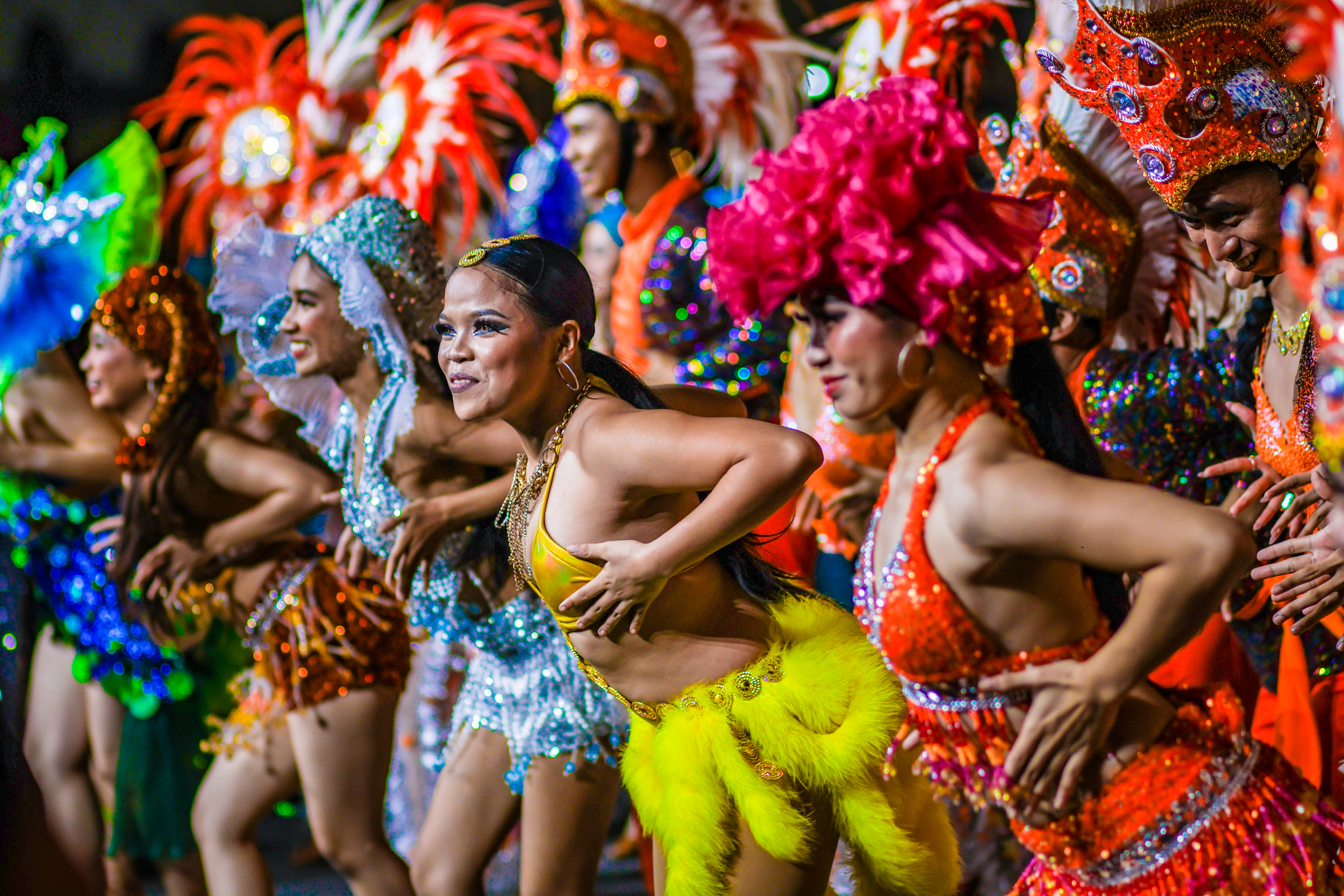
Nighttime staging of the Sinamba sa Regatta

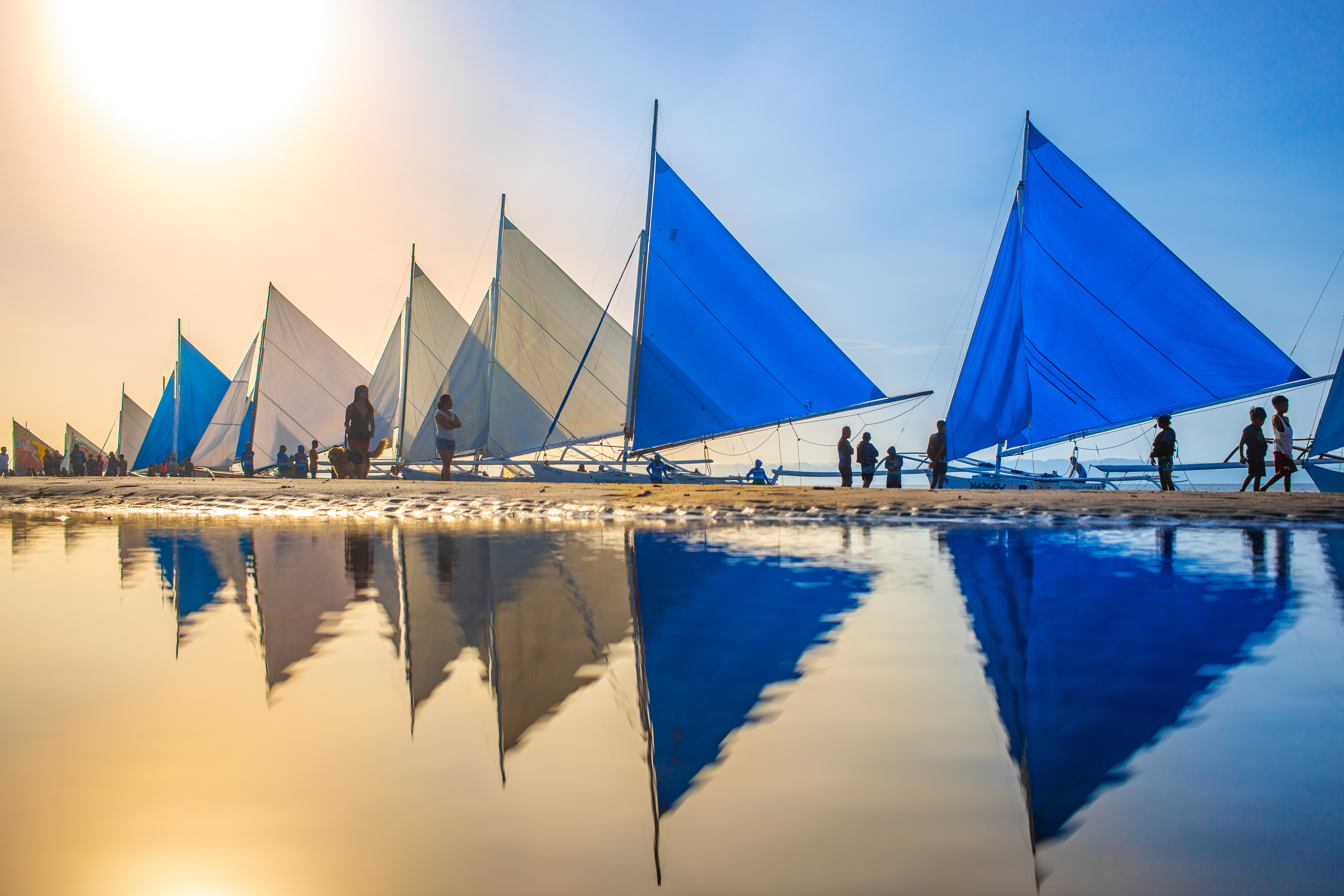
Unpainted paraws lined up along Villa Beach
