= Paraw =

Sail boat type (Philippines)

Paraw under sail in Boracay

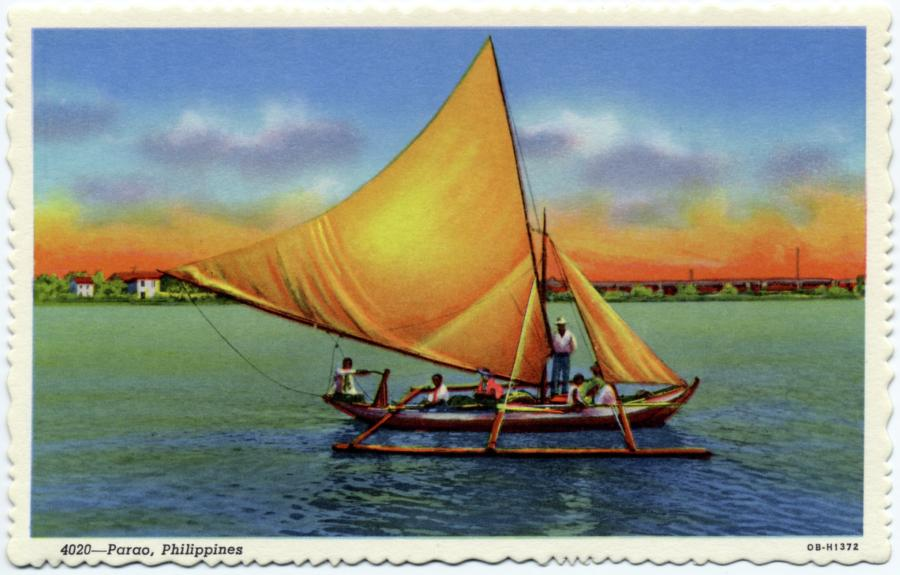
A paraw on a Philippine postcard (c.1940)

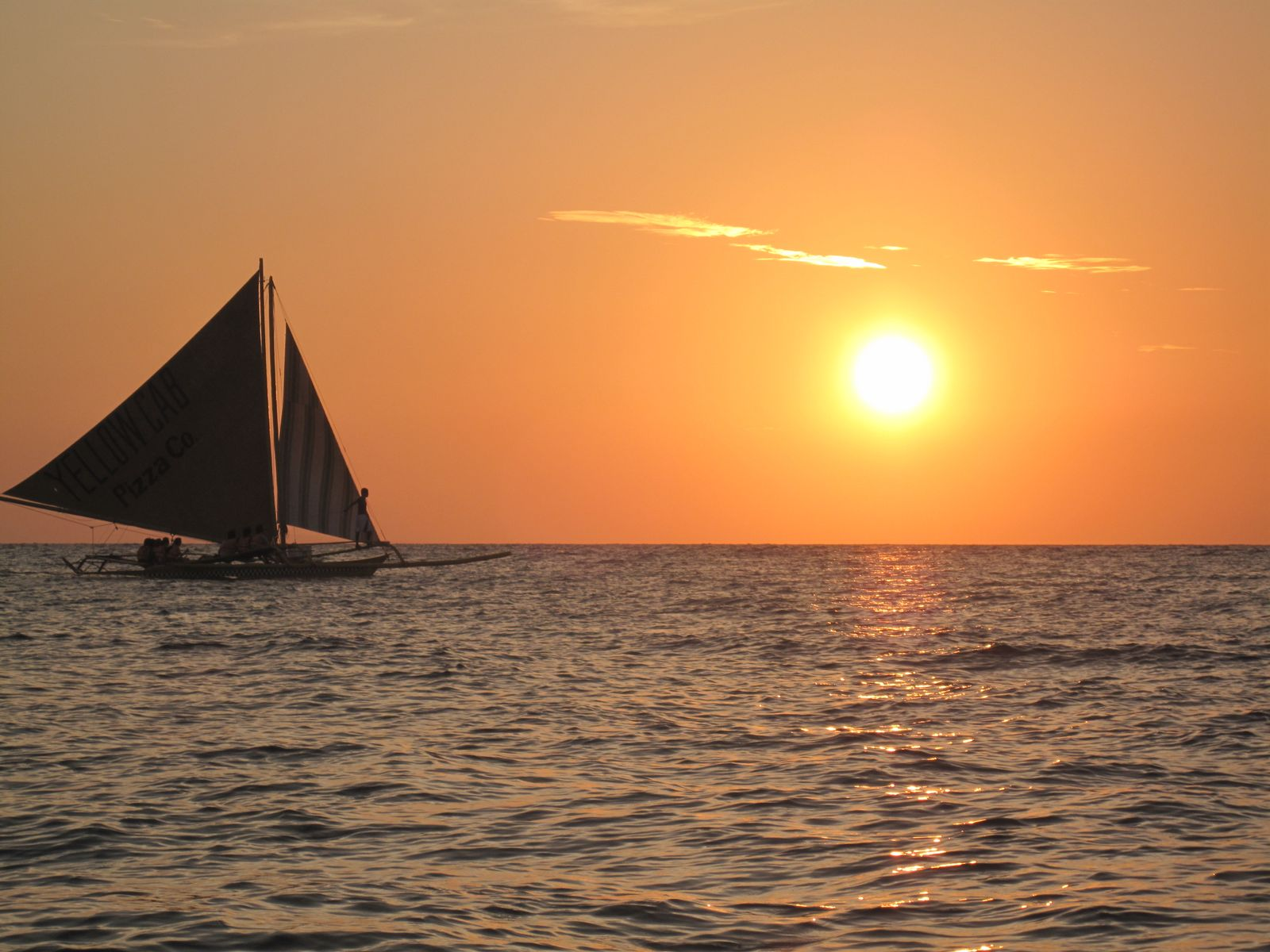
A paraw sailing on Boracay Island

Paraw (also spelled parao) are various double outrigger sail boats in the Philippines. It is a general term (similar to the term bangka) and thus can refer to a range of ship types, from small fishing canoes to large merchant lashed-lug plank boats (balangay or baloto) with two outriggers (katig) propelled by sails (usually a large crab-claw sail opposite a smaller triangular foresail)

== Etymology ==
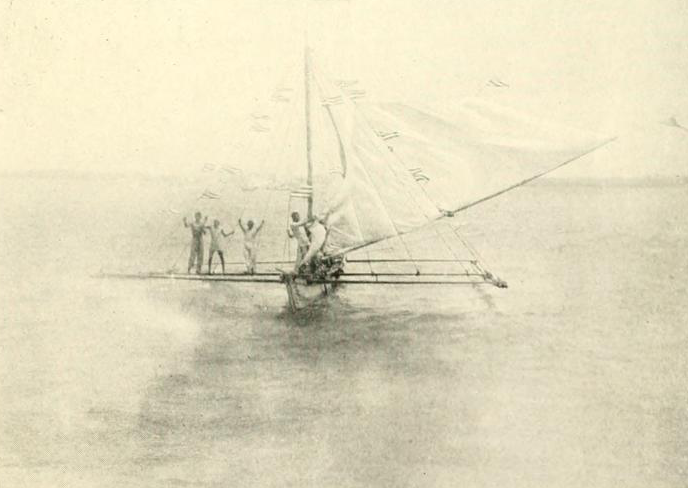
1913 photograph of a paraw off Bacolod, Negros with traditional Austronesian crab claw sails

The word paraw (also spelled parao) is a cognate of the terms proa of the Pacific Islands, and perahu or prau of Malay-Indonesia. It is likely ultimately derived from the Proto-Western-Malayo-Polynesian doublets *parahu and *padaw (the former derived from Proto-Malayo-Polynesian *paraqu), both meaning "sailboat". It refers to outrigger boats propelled by sails (layag). It is a type of bangka, the wider term used for boats (with or without outriggers) in the Philippines.

== Characteristics ==
The paraw has three major elements that make it a paraw: the bangka (canoe or main hull), the katig (outriggers), and the layag (sails). Motorized versions of bangkas (with outriggers) are commonly known as pump boats and are used for inter-island travel.

Paraws can sail between 11 and 17 knots (20~31 km/h). The outriggers (ama), or katig, are made of wood or bamboo, and may be straight or curved upward much like skis.

== Construction ==
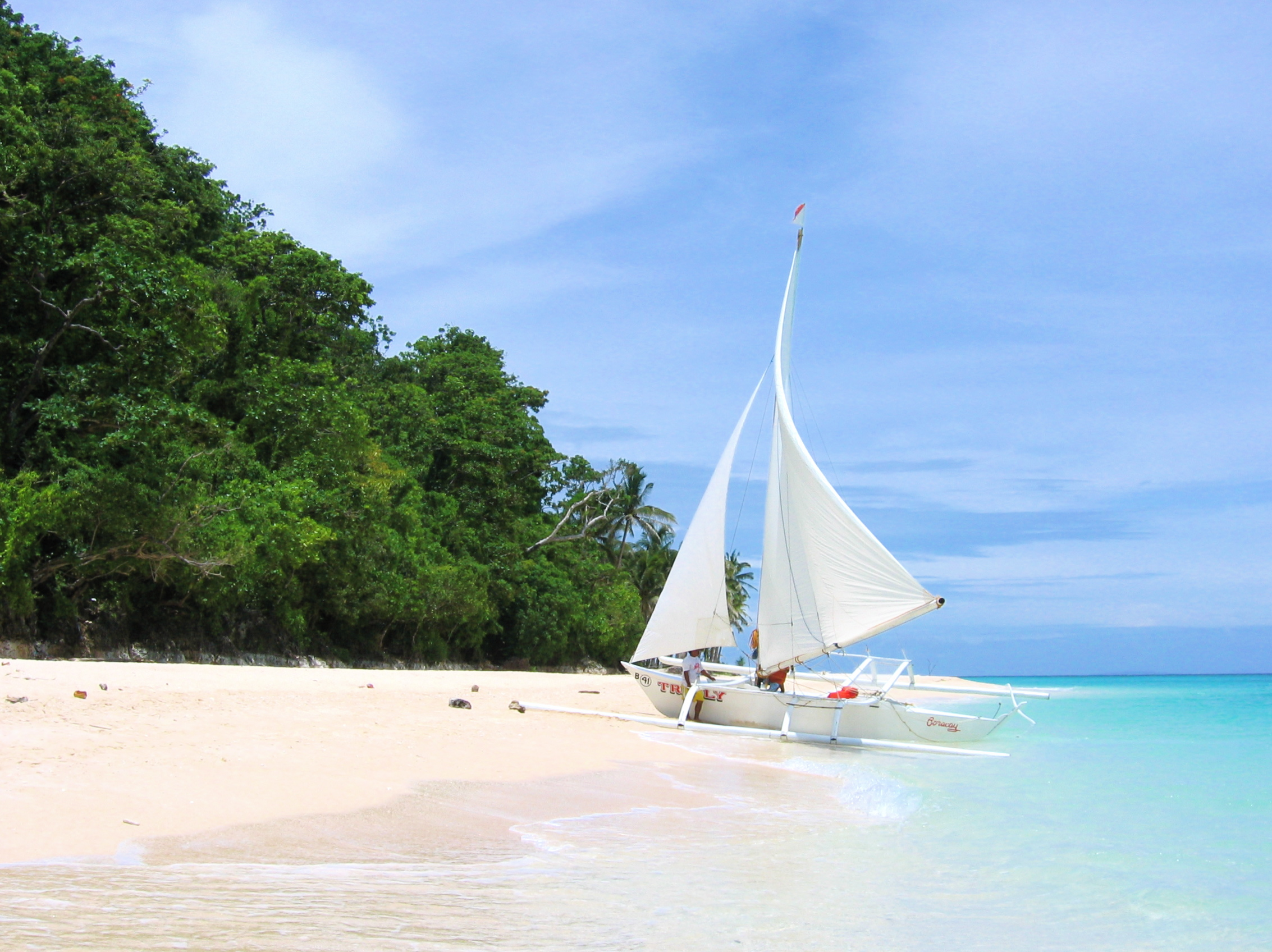
A paraw sailboat on a beach

Traditionally, these boats have been made from dungon, guisoc, ipil, duca, baslayan, obacya, bayog, Philippine mahogany (lawaan), basa and molave. Modern versions use plywood. The ropes of the boats are traditionally made from abaca (Manila hemp), but are now often synthetic rope.

The main hull (excluding outriggers) is called a bangka for dugout canoes or baloto (also balangay, baroto, biroko, biray, etc.) for hulls made of planks secured with lashed lugs. The boat itself may be classified by passenger capacity as isahan ('for one [person]') or duwahan ('for two [persons]'), but the paraw usually has capacity for more than two people, leading to its use in ferrying small groups of passengers and goods between islands. The narrow cross-sections of the main hull and outriggers make them sleek, slicing through water without a lot of drag.

The two katig (outriggers) were usually made from bamboo or various kinds of wood and served as counterpoise so that the boat would not easily overturn. They are attached to the boat via tarik (akas). The presence of the outriggers negates the need for a heavy keel and therefore reduces the overall weight of the paraw without sacrificing stability.

The layag or main sail may be made of anything, including woven mats, cloth, canvas, and even sack cloth. Traditionally, the main sail is similar to a lateen rig or a crabclaw sail and is attached to two spars, one vertical and one horizontal. The sail differs from a traditional lateen rig in that the vertical spar is parallel to the mast and does not suffer from bad tack. The sail's spar may be as long as the mast, and may appear to be longer than the mast when attached to it. There are no guidelines as to how the main sail is shaped, but it may approximate an equilateral triangle. The paraw is also equipped with a foresail or jib and adds to the overall surface area and generated thrust derived from the wind. A variation of the paraw with rectangular sails is the vinta.

The mast, commonly made of bamboo, is secured by lines attached to, among other things, the outriggers, the fore (and sometimes, the aft) and various parts of the boat. Historically, the mast of smaller paraws was a spear or bangkaw and was a useful part of the ship when conducting raids against other seaside villages.

== Current uses ==
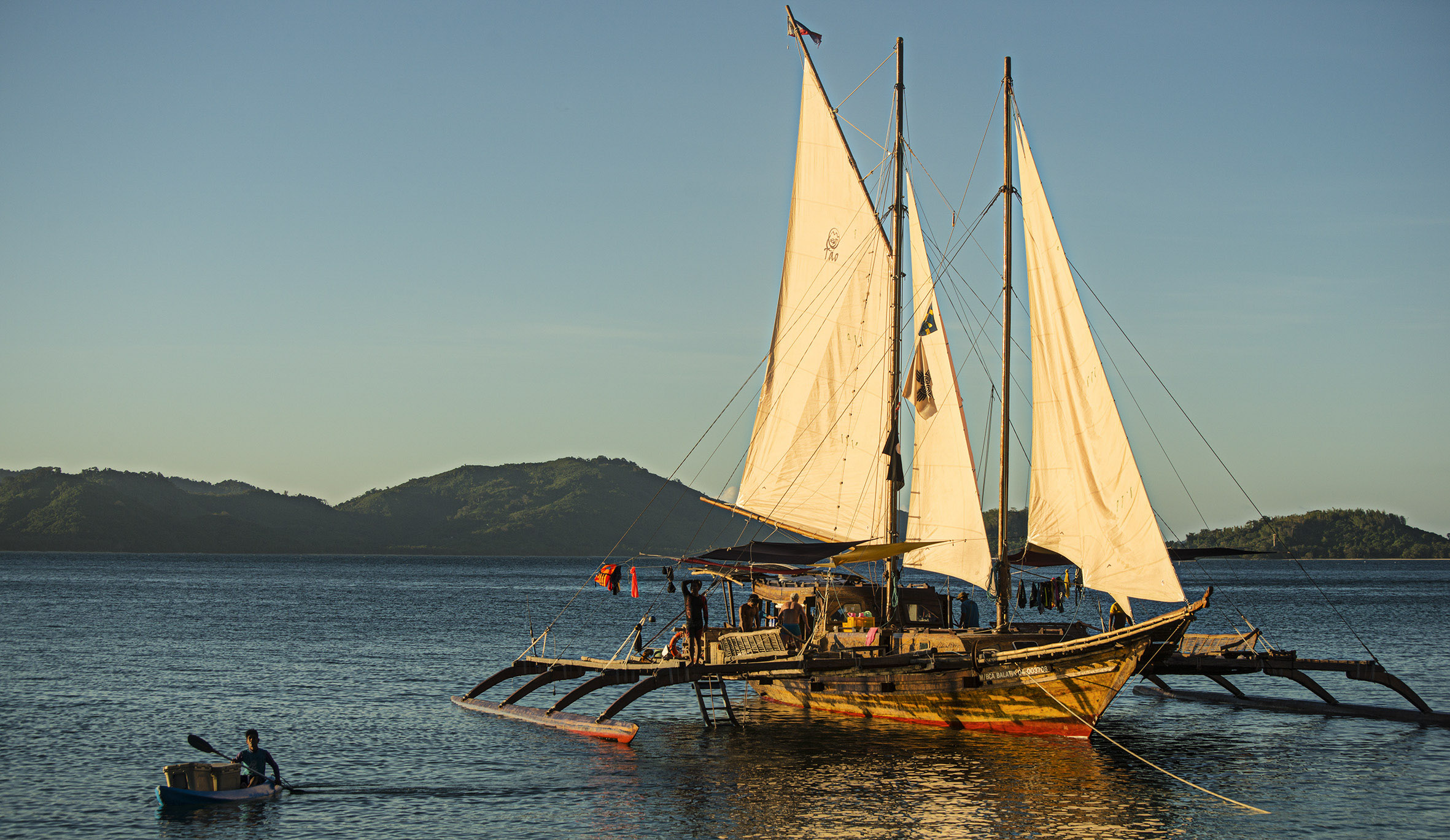
The Balatik, a 74 ft (23 m) sailing paraw used by Tao Philippines in Coron, Palawan

=== Balatik ===
In November 2012, a team led by the artisan Gener Paduga, along with the Tao Philippines organization, started building a full-sized paraw sailboat in Palawan. Paduga originally envisioned the project while crewing a sailing yacht from Palawan to Africa. After having witnessed the thriving native sailing traditions in the Indian Ocean, he decided to revive the almost extinct native boat-building and sailing traditions of the Philippines. Sailing ships, which were once used throughout the islands, were in steep decline after engines became widely available in the 1970s.

The team consisted of several traditional boat carpenters from the islands of Cagayancillo and Romblon. The boat was constructed entirely using native techniques and also featured intricate designs by two master carvers of the native Palaw'an people. The boat was completed in March 2014 and was officially named the Balatik, after a traditional Filipino constellation (equivalent to Orion's Belt) named after a hunter's trapping device. It is 74 ft (23 m) long and 9 ft (2.7 m) at the widest point of the hull. It has two masts with four sails and could be crewed by three or four people. The boat is currently used both for tourism and for educational and social welfare projects of the Tao Kalahi Foundation in Palawan.

=== Paraw Regatta Festival ===
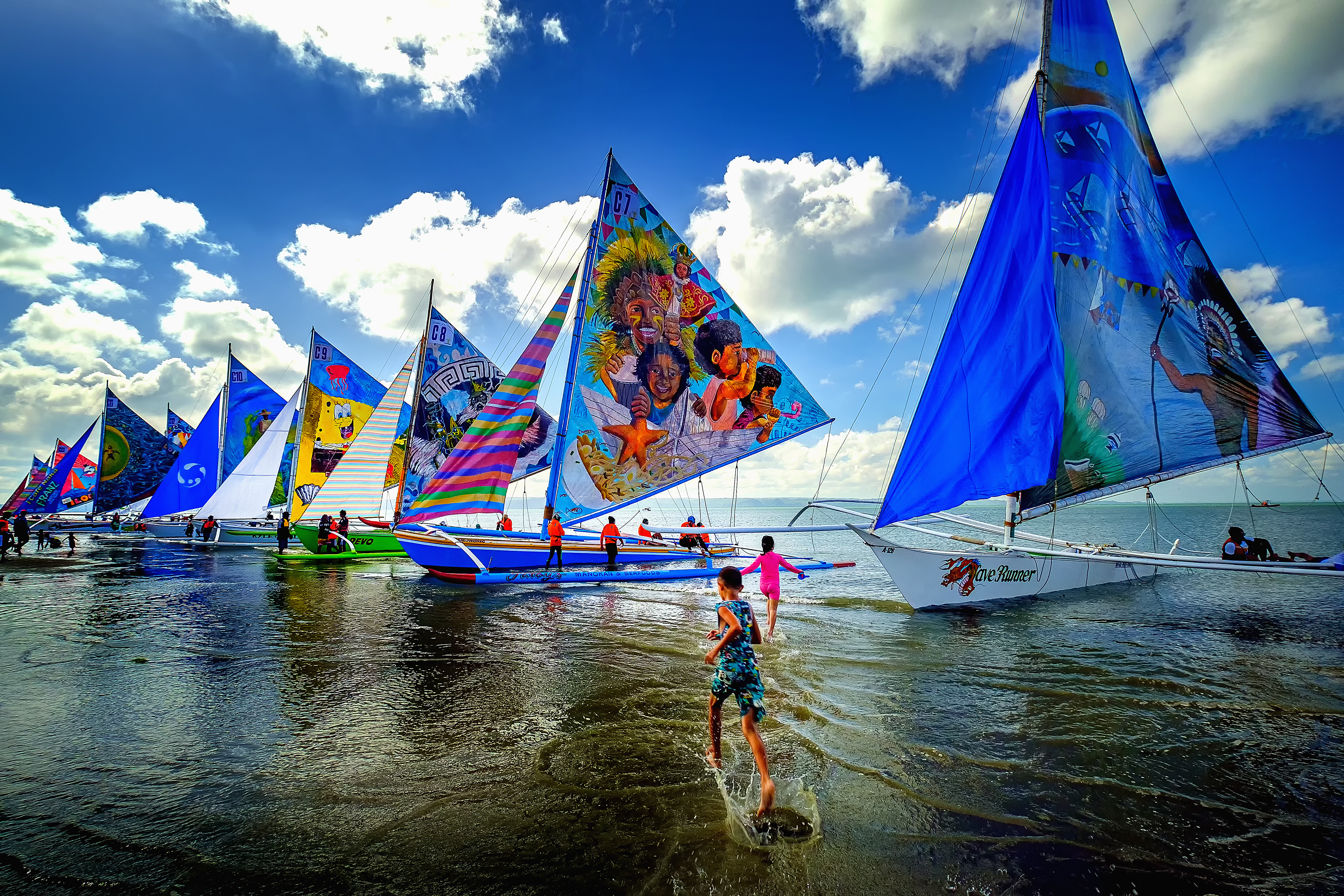
Painted paraws line the Villa Beach during the Paraw Regatta Festival in Iloilo City

The Paraw Regatta Festival, the largest sailboat race in the Philippines and the oldest in Asia, has been held annually since 1973. The race covers approximately 36.5 kilometers, starting in Villa Beach in the Arevalo district of Iloilo City and crossing the Iloilo Strait to Guimaras Island. The course is known for its challenging wind conditions and tidal patterns, which test the seamanship and sailing skills of participating crews.

Paraws of different classes compete, some built strictly according to traditional boat-building methods, while others incorporate modern materials. The sails are typically decorated with colorful artistic designs as part of the Pinta de Layag competition during the festival.

=== Paraw sailing Boracay Island ===
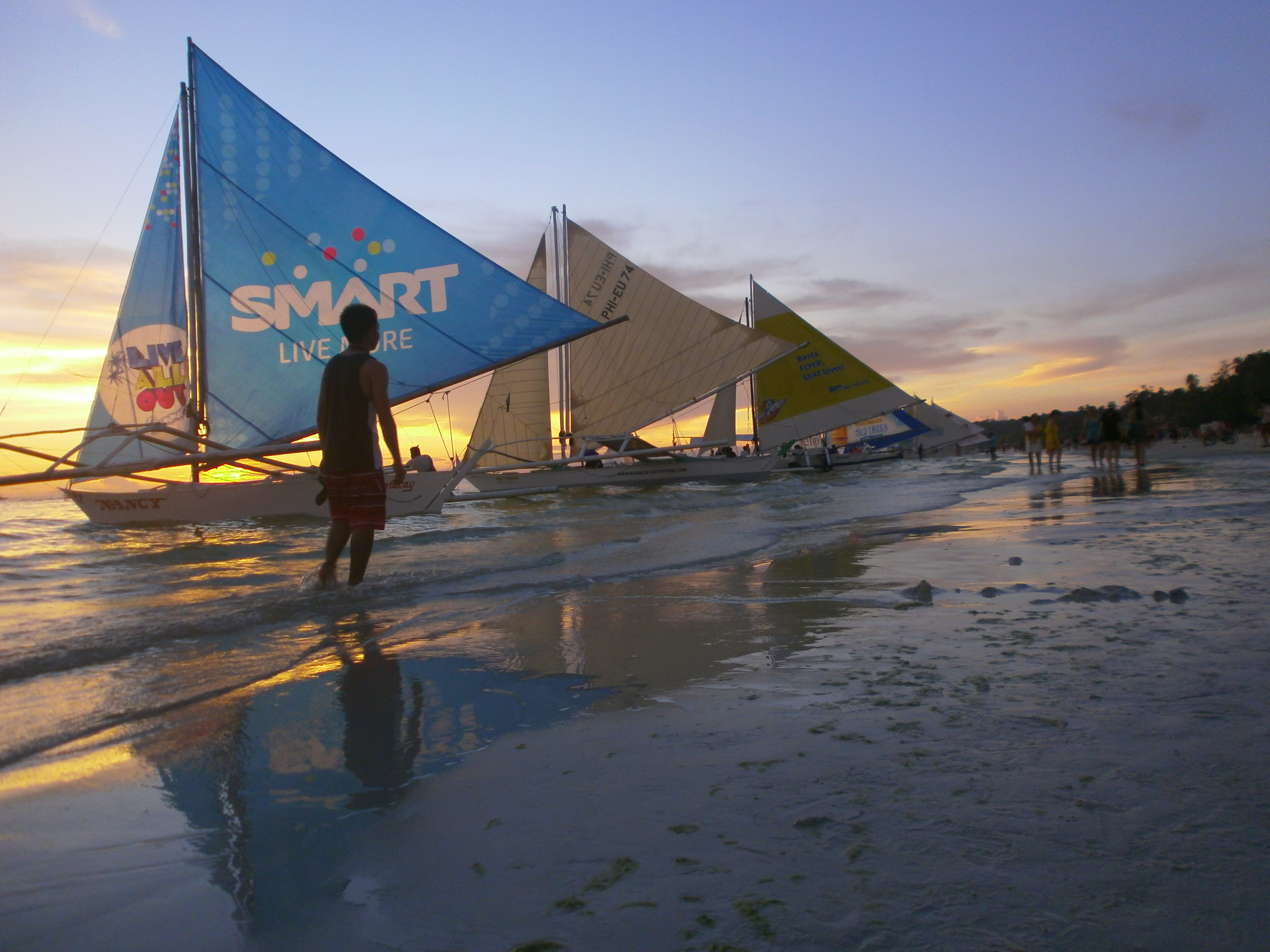
Paraws for rent in the tourist island of Boracay

Before Boracay Island became a tourist spot, paraws were used for fishing and transportation of people as well as goods. Paraw sailing these days is a major tourist attraction. Local sailors offer their paraws for island hopping and sunset sailing for a fairly small rental fee.

== See also ==
- Balangay
- Bigiw
- Karakoa
- Pinisi
- Vinta
