= Lists of watercraft types =

Wikipedia includes several lists of watercraft types. Note that "type" may refer to the physical characteristics or the intended purpose of the vessel. This is distinct from a "class", where all the vessels share the same design.

- List of boat types
  - List of Philippine boats and ships
  - List of the types of canal craft in the United Kingdom
  - List of sailing boat types
- List of types of naval vessels
- List of ship types

== See also ==
- List of naval ship classes in service
- List of submarine classes in service
- List of auxiliary ship classes in service
