= Camiña Balay Nga Bato =

Historic house in Iloilo, Philippines

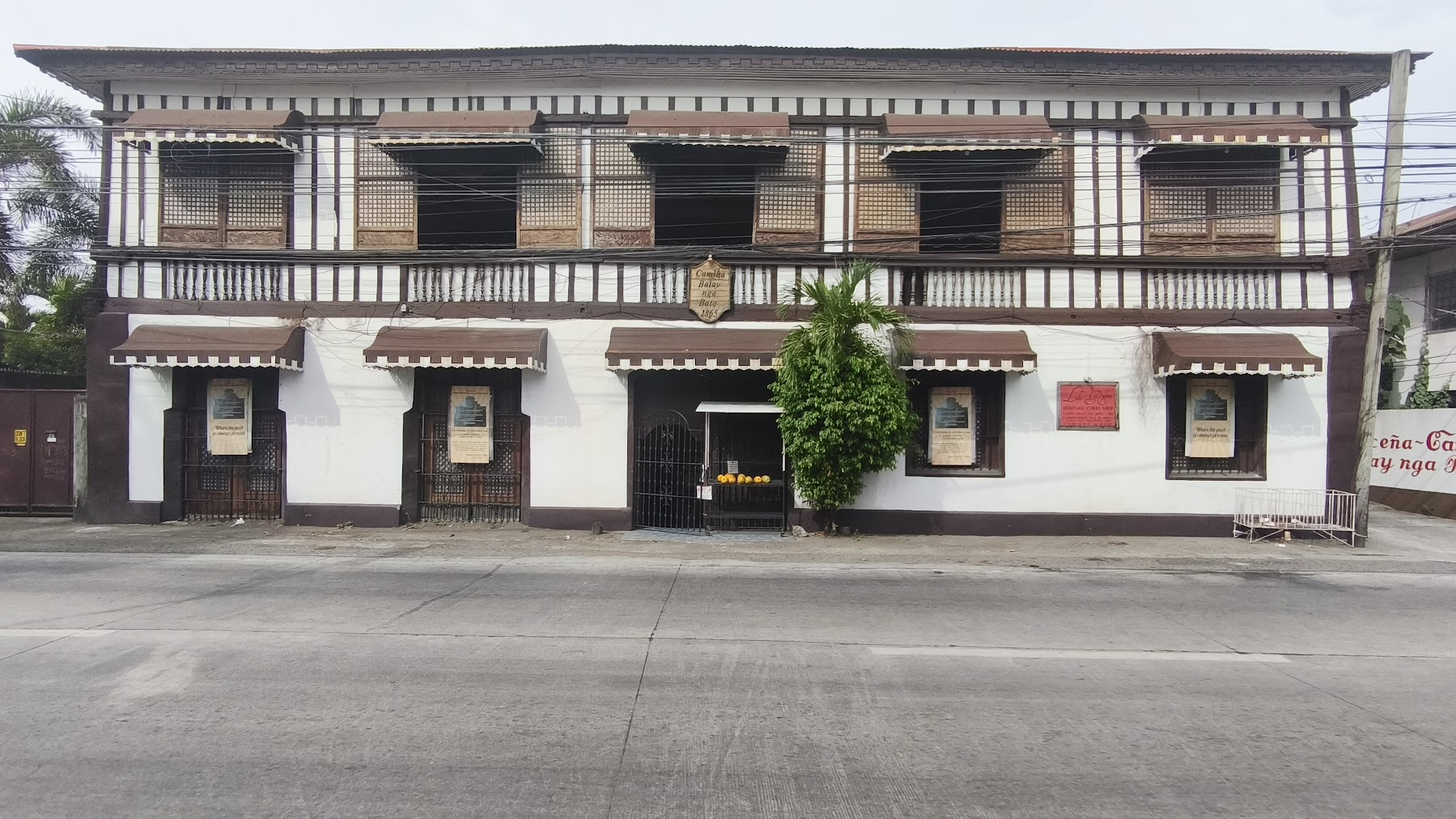
- Interactive map of the Camiña Balay Nga Bato area

General information
- Location: 20 Osmeña Street, Arevalo, Iloilo City, Philippines
- Coordinates: 10°41′23″N 122°30′54″E
- Year built: 1865

Technical details
- Floor count: 2

Design and construction
- Architect: Anselmo Avanceña

Avanceña–Camiña Balay Nga Bato (lit. 'Avanceña–Camiña Stone House'), also known simply as Camiña Balay Nga Bato, is a 161-year-old bahay na bato in the Arevalo district, Iloilo City, Philippines. It was built in 1865 and was designed by the first parish priest of Molo, Anselmo Avanceña, for Don Fernando Avanceña and his wife, Eulalia Abaja. It was then passed on from one family to another until it came under the Camiñas family.^{[1]} It is now owned by the fourth generation of the original owners, Gerard Camiña, former director of the Land Transportation Office in Western Visayas, and his wife, Luth Camiña. The ancestral house was declared as an Important Cultural Property by the National Museum of the Philippines (NMP) in 2015.

The heritage house is also now a heritage museum and a restaurant, serving a variety of Ilonggo delicacies and its well-known homemade tsokolate tablea (chocolate tablets).

== History ==
The house was once the home of Fernando Avancena and his wife, Eulalia Abaja, and was built in the 1860s. The structure of the house was patterned after the bahay kubo, or "cube house." It was made of strong and natural materials—the roof was made of bamboo and nipa; the floors were made of narra and ivory. The foundation was supported by 24 tree trunks. The business of the family was hablon weaving. A hablon is a handmade cloth with intricate designs. The family's hablon business is still active today and is led by current owners, Gerard Camiña and wife, Luth Camiña. In 2010, the owners made the ancestral house open to the public as a heritage museum and as a restaurant.

On December 23, 2015, it was declared as an important cultural property by the National Museum by virtue of Resolution No. 23-2015 and Republic Act 10066 (National Cultural Heritage Act of 2009).

== Gallery ==
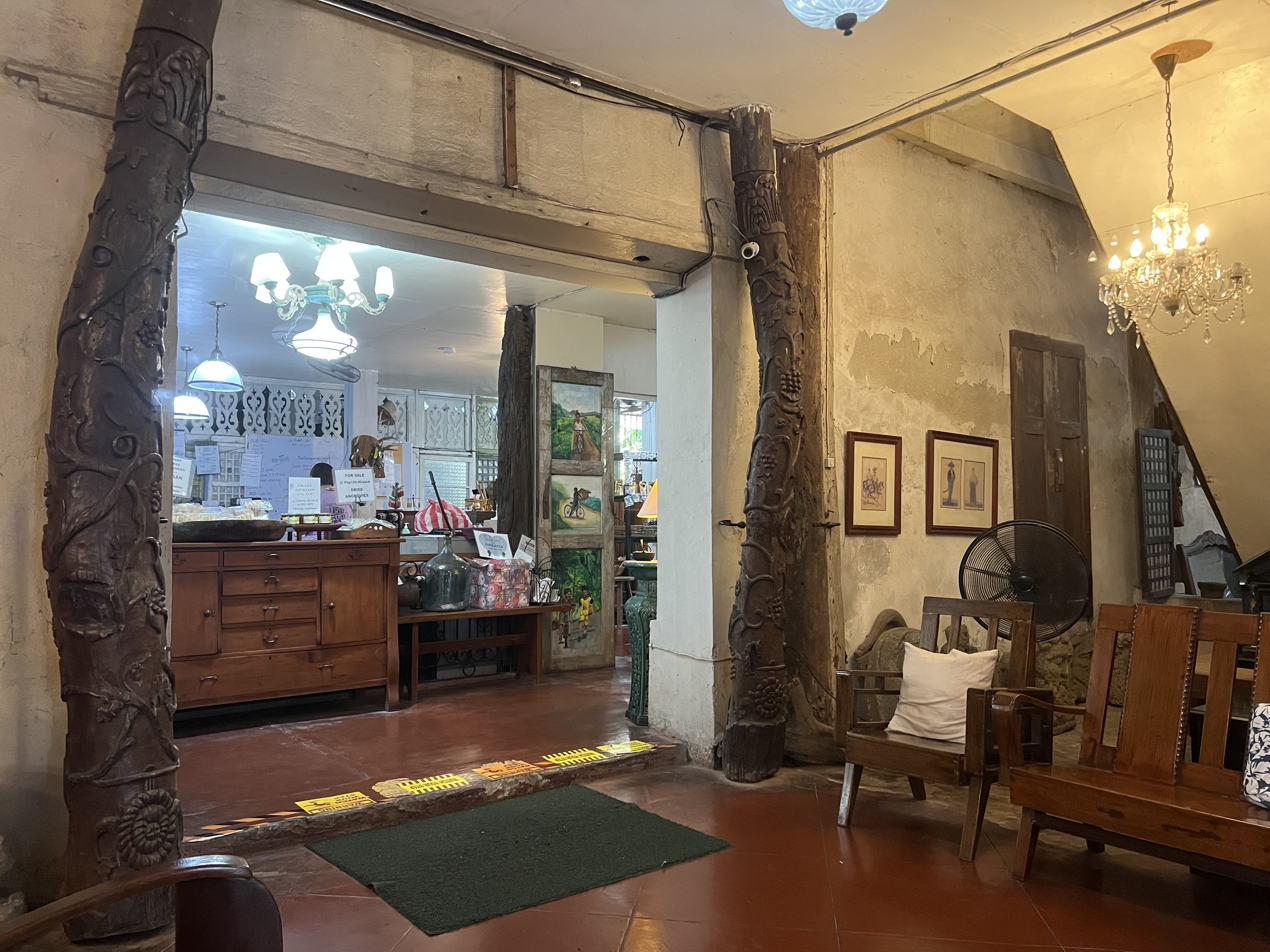
Ground floor with carved tree trunks supporting the second floor

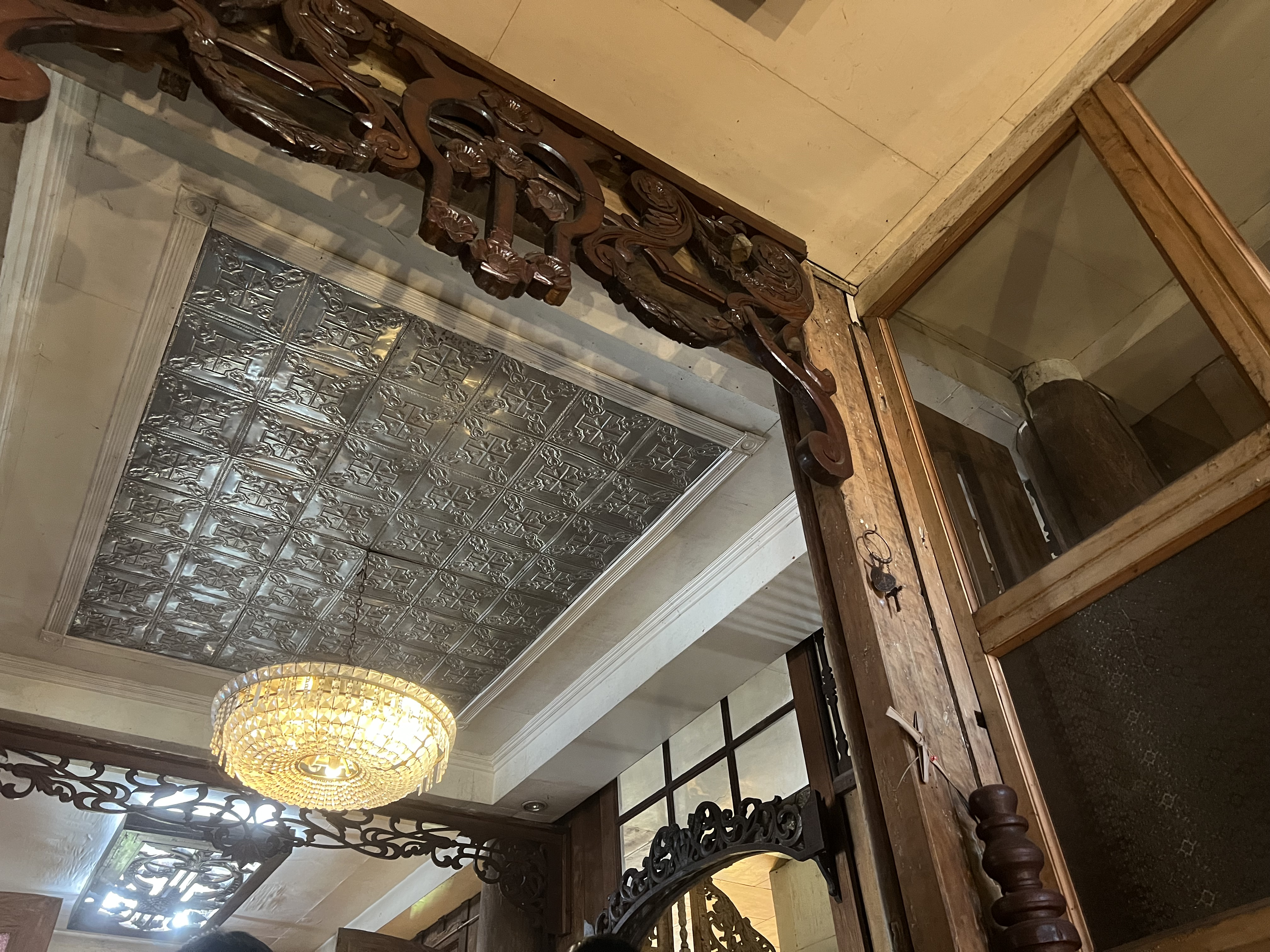
Second floor with stamped metal ceiling

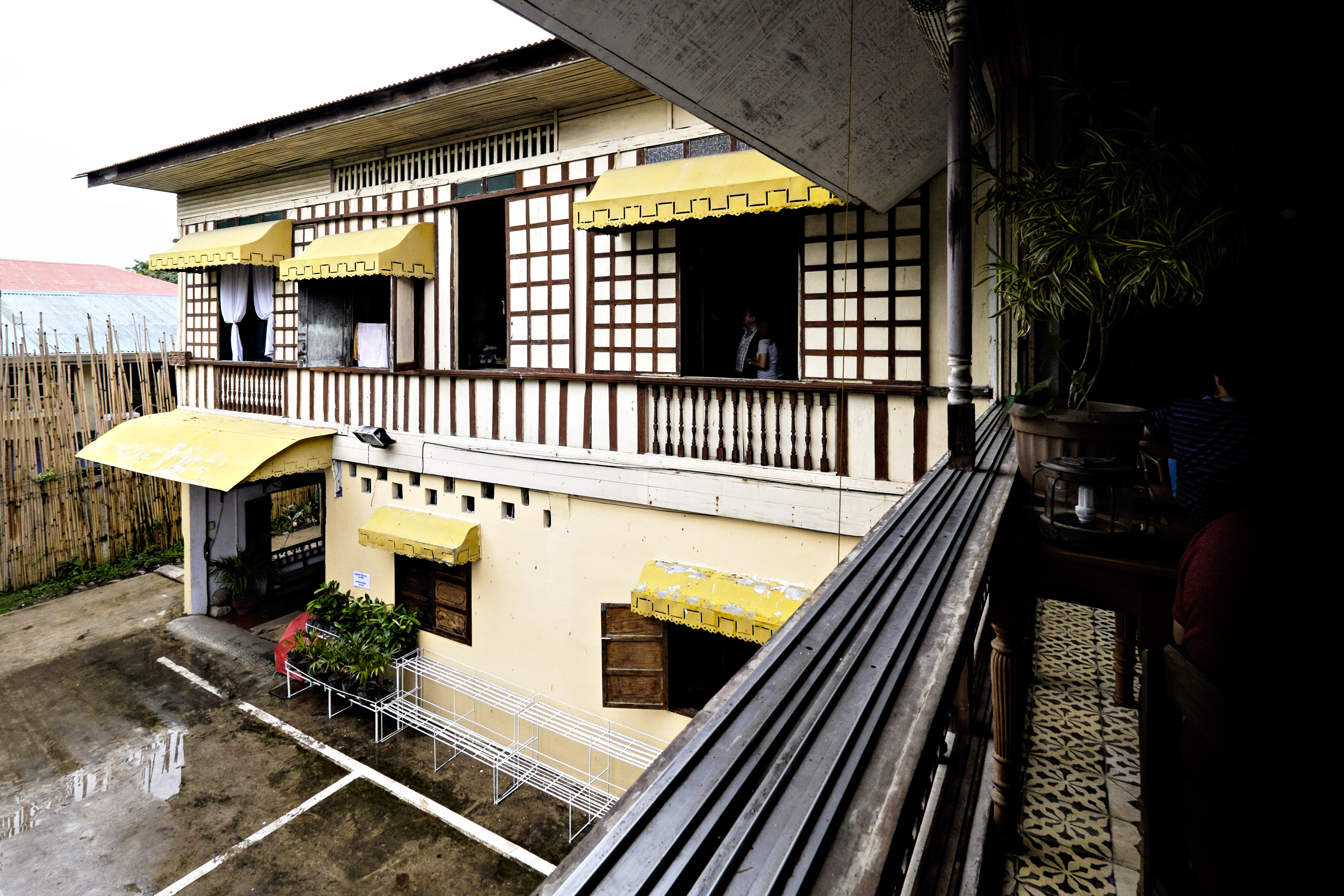
As viewed from the restaurant extension
