= Siete Pecados =

Coordinates: 10°46′N 122°41′E

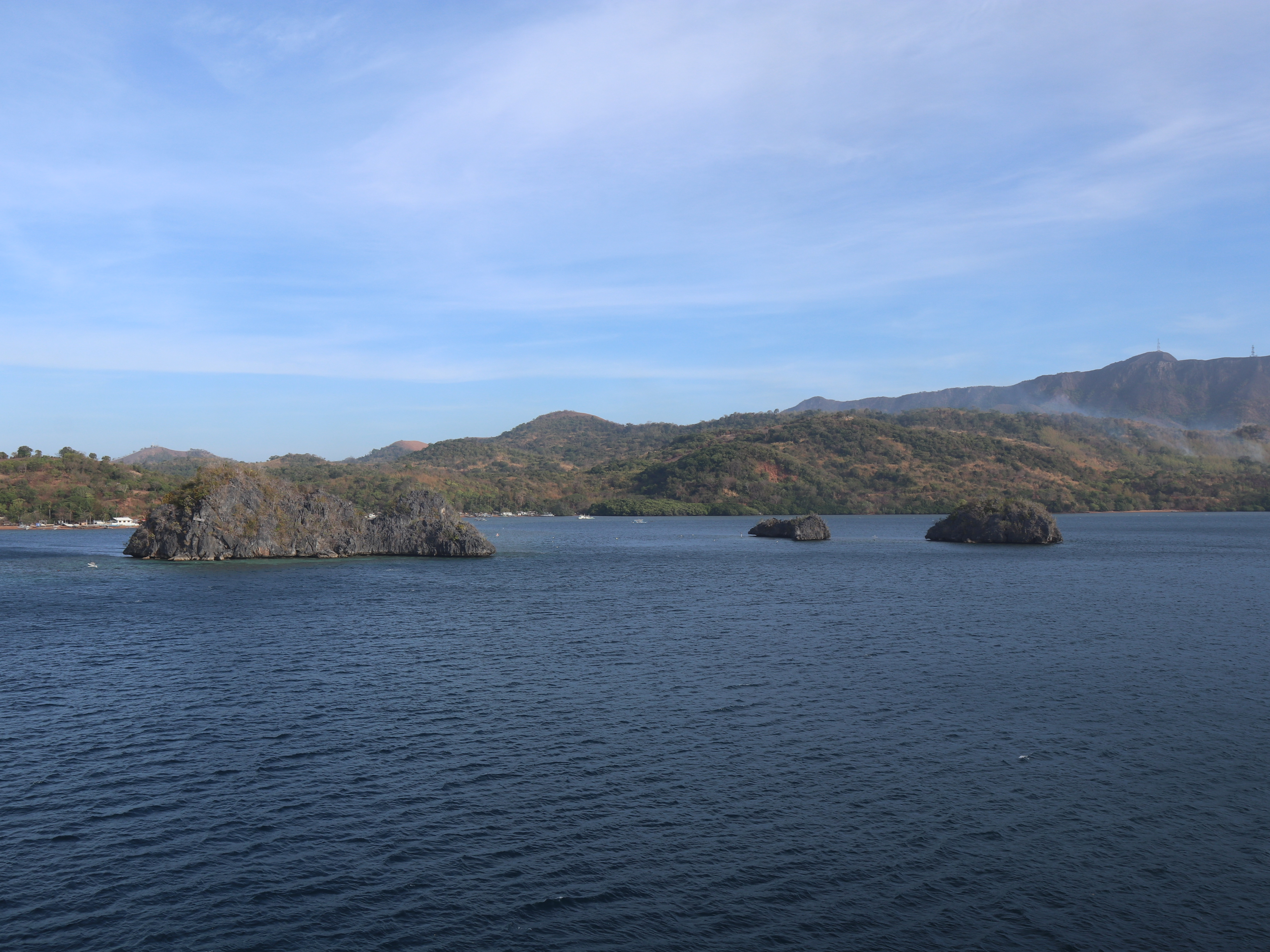
Siete Pecados in Coron, Palawan

Isles of the Seven Sins, more commonly known as Siete Pecados, may refer to either of two unrelated groups of seven rocky islets in the Philippines. One group is located in the Iloilo Strait between the municipalities of Buenavista, Guimaras, and Dumangas, Iloilo, while the other comprises the islets of the Siete Pecados Marine Park in the Calamian Islands off the coast of Coron, Palawan. Both groups are recognized local landmarks and tourist attractions.

== Guimaras and Iloilo ==
The Siete Pecados of Guimaras is a group of seven rocky islets situated in the Iloilo Strait between the municipalities of Buenavista, Guimaras, and Dumangas, Iloilo. With a maximum elevation of only 8 metres (26 ft), the islets form part of a coastal tourist area that includes the nearby islet of Roca Encantada (Enchanted Rock) off the coast of Buenavista.

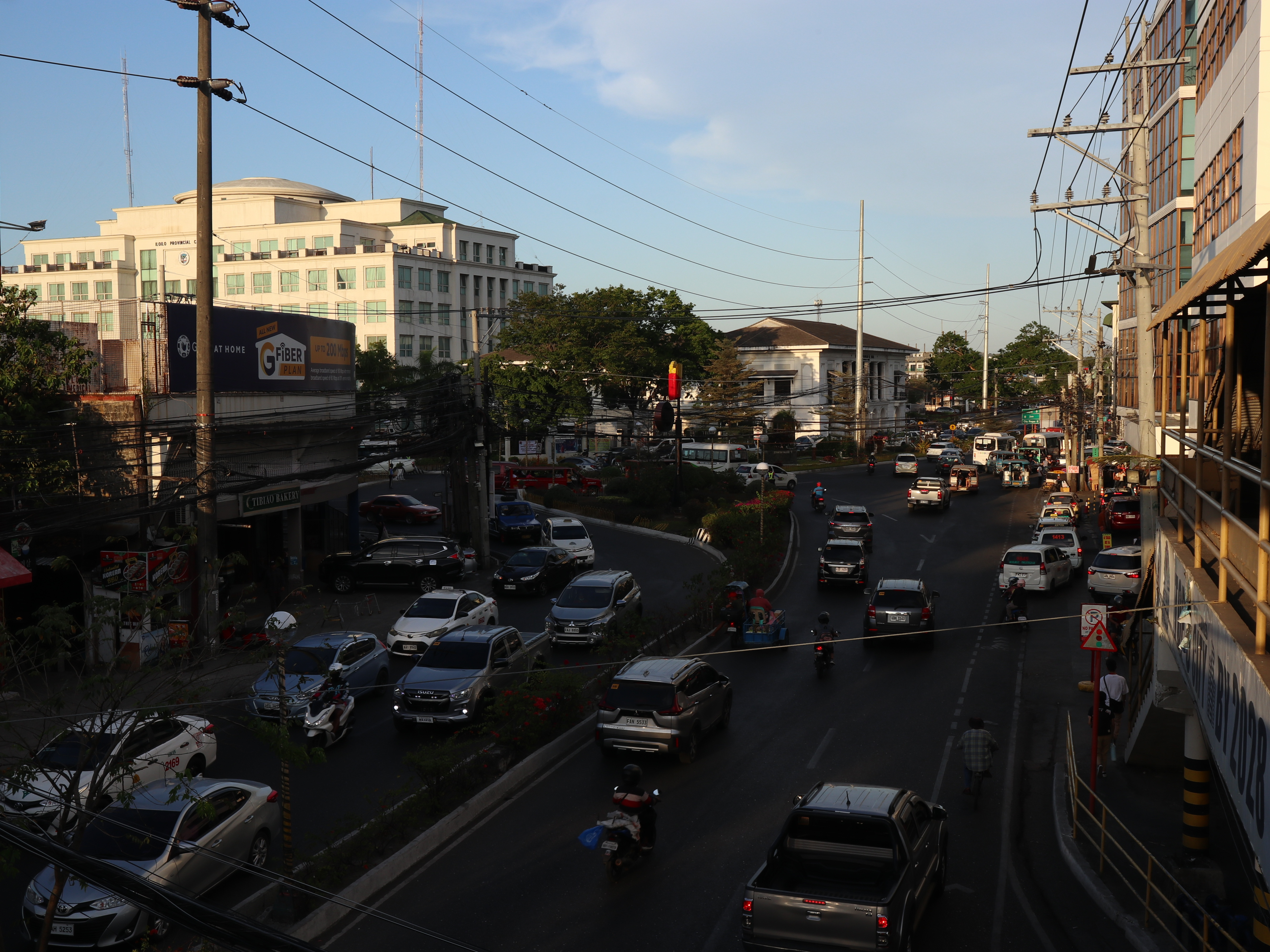
Siete Pecados traffic islands in Iloilo City

The name Siete Pecados is also used colloquially for a triangular traffic island and intersection in Iloilo City, situated in between the Iloilo Provincial Capitol, the Atrium Mall, and the Arroyo Fountain. It was built in the 1950s and was inspired by the islets in Guimaras.

== Siete Pecados Marine Park ==
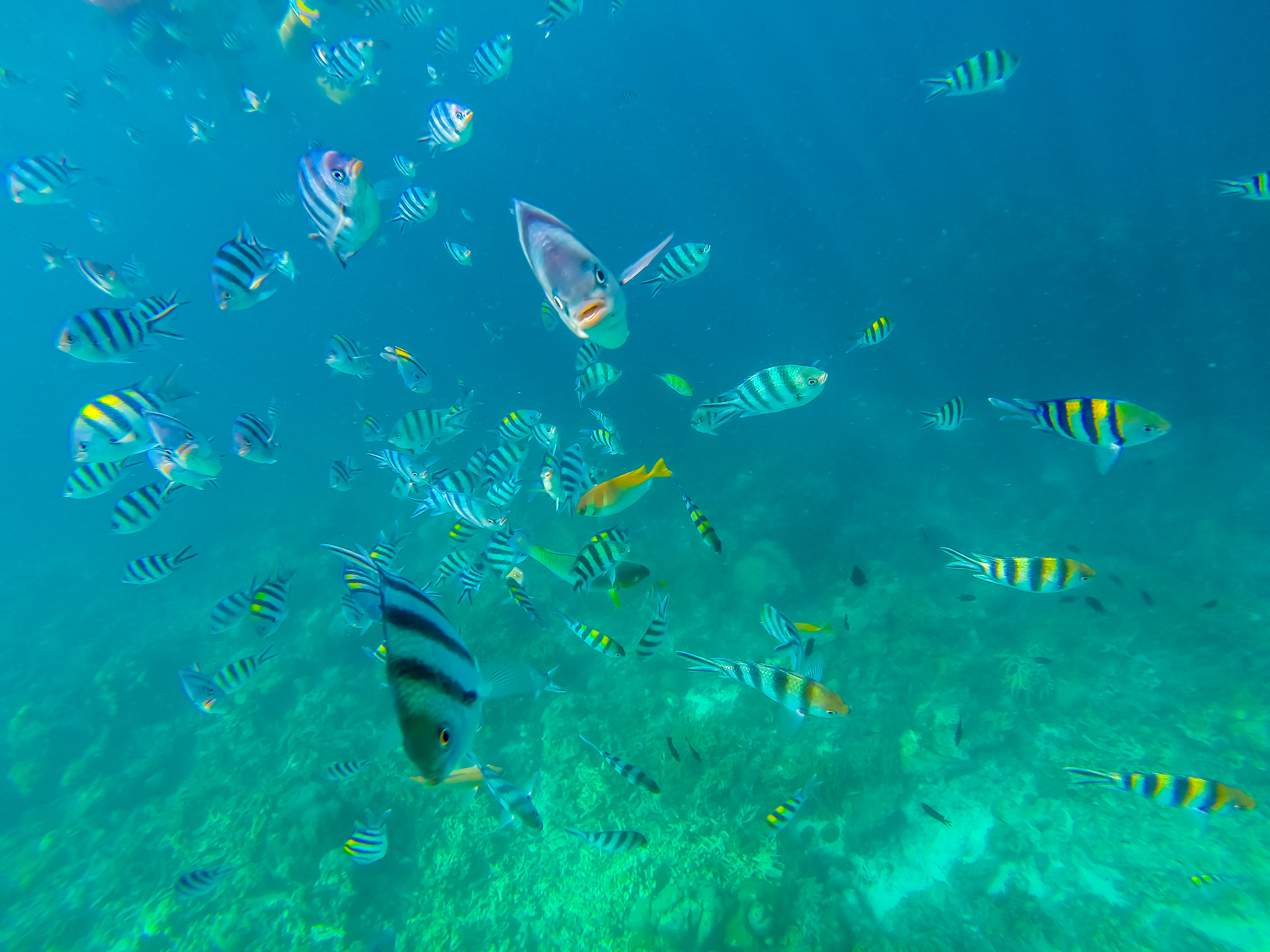
Marine life and coral reef ecosystem in Siete Pecados Marine Park

Siete Pecados Marine Park is a marine protected area in the Calamian Islands off the coast of Coron, Palawan. Established in 2005 with support from the United States Agency for International Development (USAID), the park is known for its coral reefs, marine biodiversity, and community-based conservation initiatives. Called the "Crown Jewel of Coron," it is popular with tourists for snorkeling due to its clear blue waters, vibrant coral gardens, and marine life.

On 17 April 2024, the marine park received a Blue Park Award from the Marine Conservation Institute during the 9th Our Ocean Conference in Athens, Greece. It was one of three marine protected areas recognized for excellence in marine biodiversity conservation.

== In popular culture ==
Several legends have been associated with the origin of the name Siete Pecados. According to one legend, seven sisters went swimming against their mother's wishes and drowned. In another version, the sisters drowned after attending a dance despite being forbidden to do so. In both accounts, seven rocks emerged from the sea the following day.

Another legend tells of a benevolent chieftain who asked God for a way to remember his seven daughters. His wish was granted when seven islets rose from the sea.
