= Pinnace =

Pinnace may refer to:

- Pinnace (ship's boat), a small vessel used as a tender to larger vessels among other things
- Full-rigged pinnace, a ship-rigged vessel popular in northern waters during the 17th through 19th centuries
