= Pump boat =

Outrigger canoe powered by a small gasoline or diesel engine

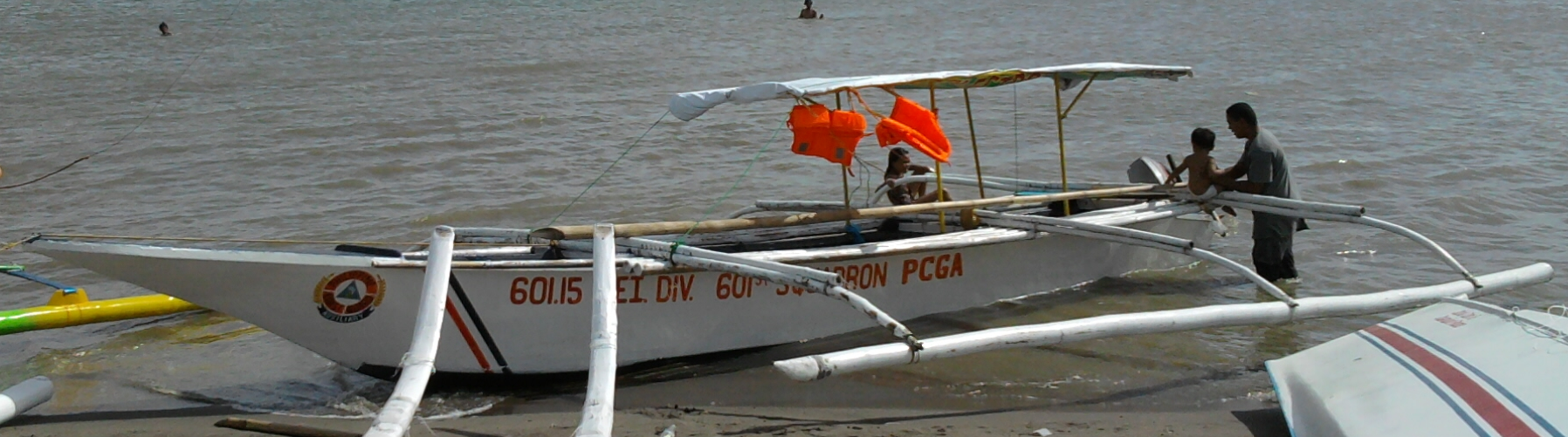
A pump boat used by the Philippine Coast Guard Auxiliary in Iloilo City

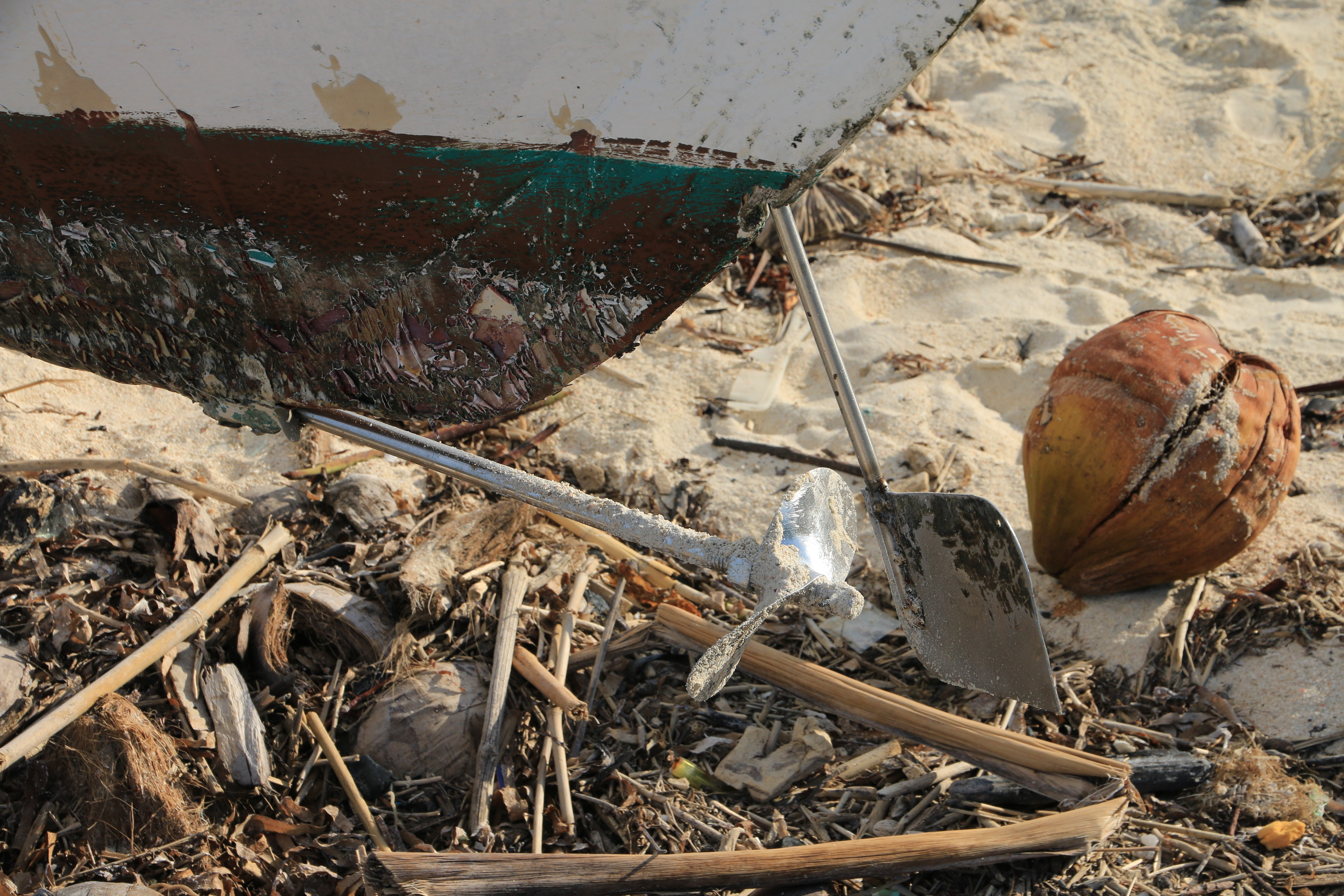
A pump boat propeller and rudder

A pump boat (usually variation as pambot in local languages) is an outrigger canoe (bangka 'boat') native to Southeast Asia powered by a small gasoline or diesel engine. Smaller pump boats might be powered by the sort of small single-cylinder engine used to drive a water pump. Larger ones are often powered by recycled automobile engines.

Pump boats are utility boats in the Philippines, used for nearly everything from inter-island transportation to fishing and even the Philippine Coast Guard. Pump boats are also used by Sama-Bajau migrants and refugees in Sabah, Malaysia and eastern Indonesia (where it is known as pombot).

== See also ==
- Paraw
- Basnigan
- Lepa (ship)
- Balangay
- Traditional fishing boat
- List of boat types
