= Floating fuel station =

Floating fuel station is a vessel, built under recognized Classification Society. The floating fuel station renders refueling services for yachts, boats, vessels, planes, cars, trucks and other vehicles. The station must have all the vessel Classification documents issued by the Classification Society. There are the stations, built for the oceans, the seas, the lakes and the rivers as well. You can find the floating fuel stations all over the world: in the United States, Canada, UK, Latvia, Ukraine, Russia, Brazil, Bangladesh and other countries. In Commonwealth of Independent States (CIS) the river floating fuel stations started their operation in the beginning of the 2000s. The first model of the floating fuel station was designed and built in Latvia. The first CIS marine floating fuel station was built by the Latvian shipbuilding company for Ukraine in 2005. The stations carry the following fuel types: petrol, gas oil, bunker fuel and diesel.

A concept has been developed for a station that produces clean fuel (likely green ammonia) using 75 large wind turbines per hub.
