= Iloilo Strait =

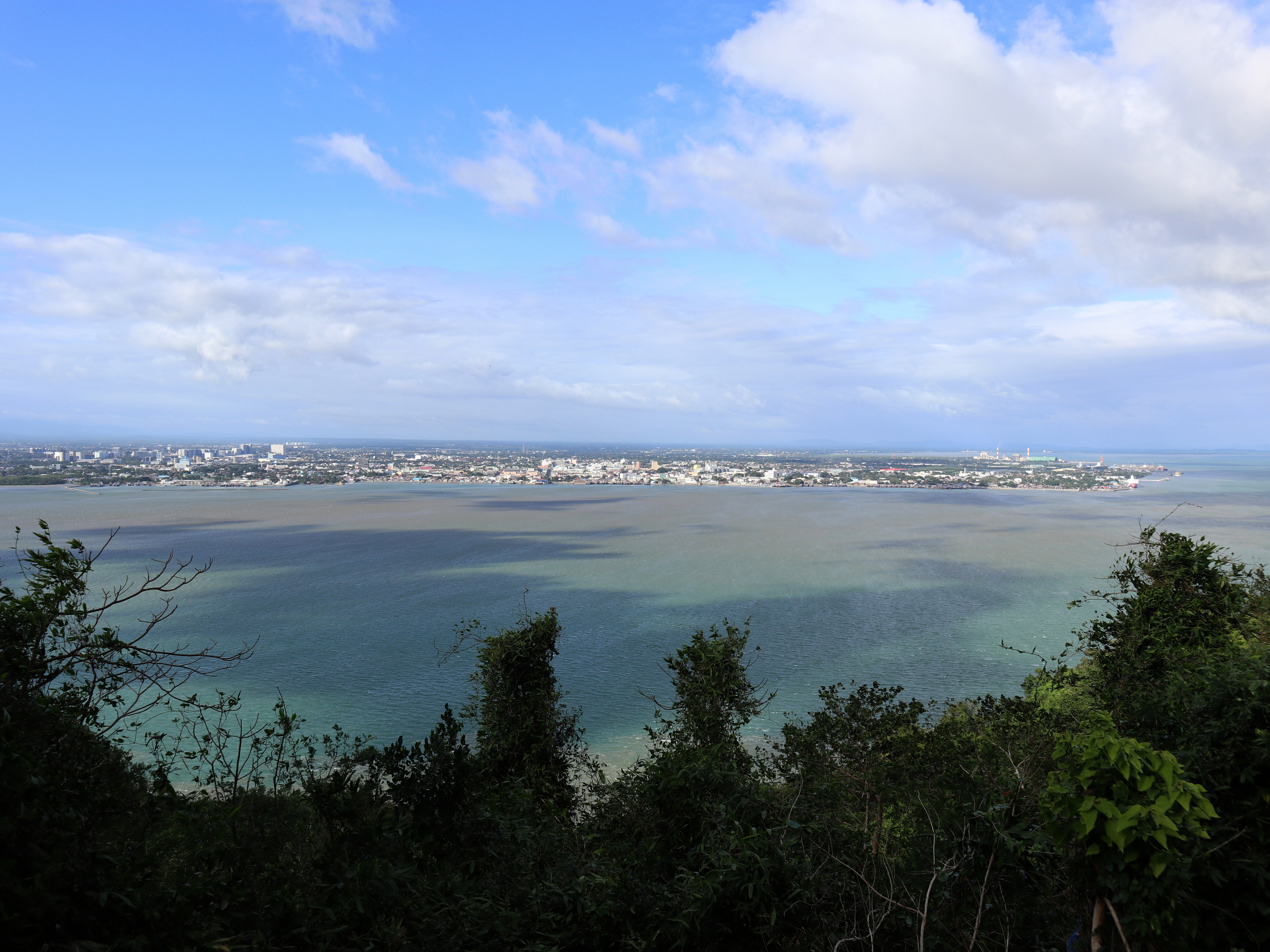
- Aerial view of the strait from Balaan bukid in Guimaras with Iloilo City in the background

- Location within the Visayas Iloilo Strait (Philippines)

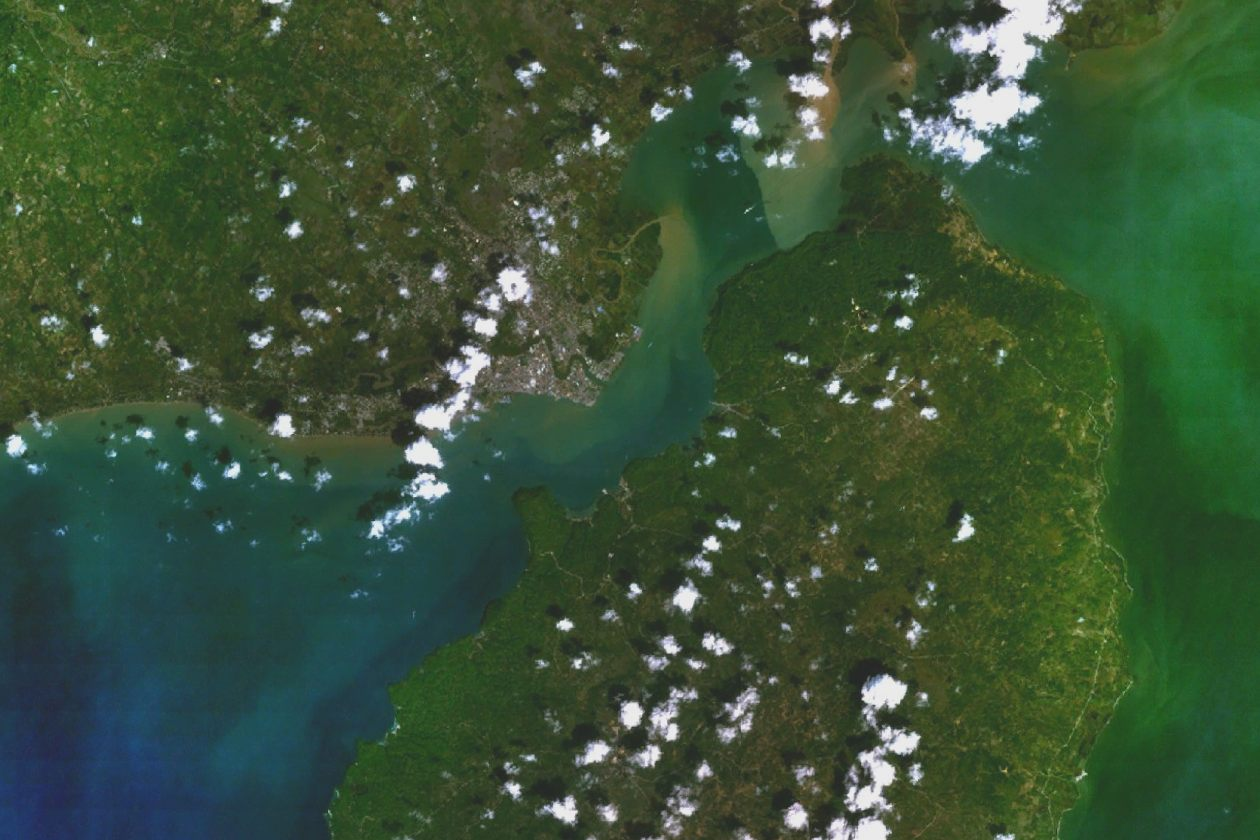
- NASA satellite image taken before May 2007
- Location: Western Visayas
- Coordinates: 10°41′07″N 122°35′21″E
- Type: strait
- Etymology: Iloilo
- Part of: Sulu Sea
- Max. length: 25 km (16 mi), NE-SW
- Settlements: Iloilo City

The Iloilo Strait is a strait in the Philippines that separates the islands of Panay and Guimaras in the Visayas, and connects Panay Gulf with the Guimaras Strait. It is the location of the Port of Iloilo, the third-busiest of the ports in the Philippines in number of ships. Iloilo City on Panay is the major city located on the strait with Buenavista and Jordan, both on Guimaras, immediately across the strait from the city. The Iloilo River empties into the strait.

Pump boat ferries cross every few minutes from Iloilo City to Guimaras and vice versa. Ships doing business with the Port of Iloilo often moor in the strait.

== History ==
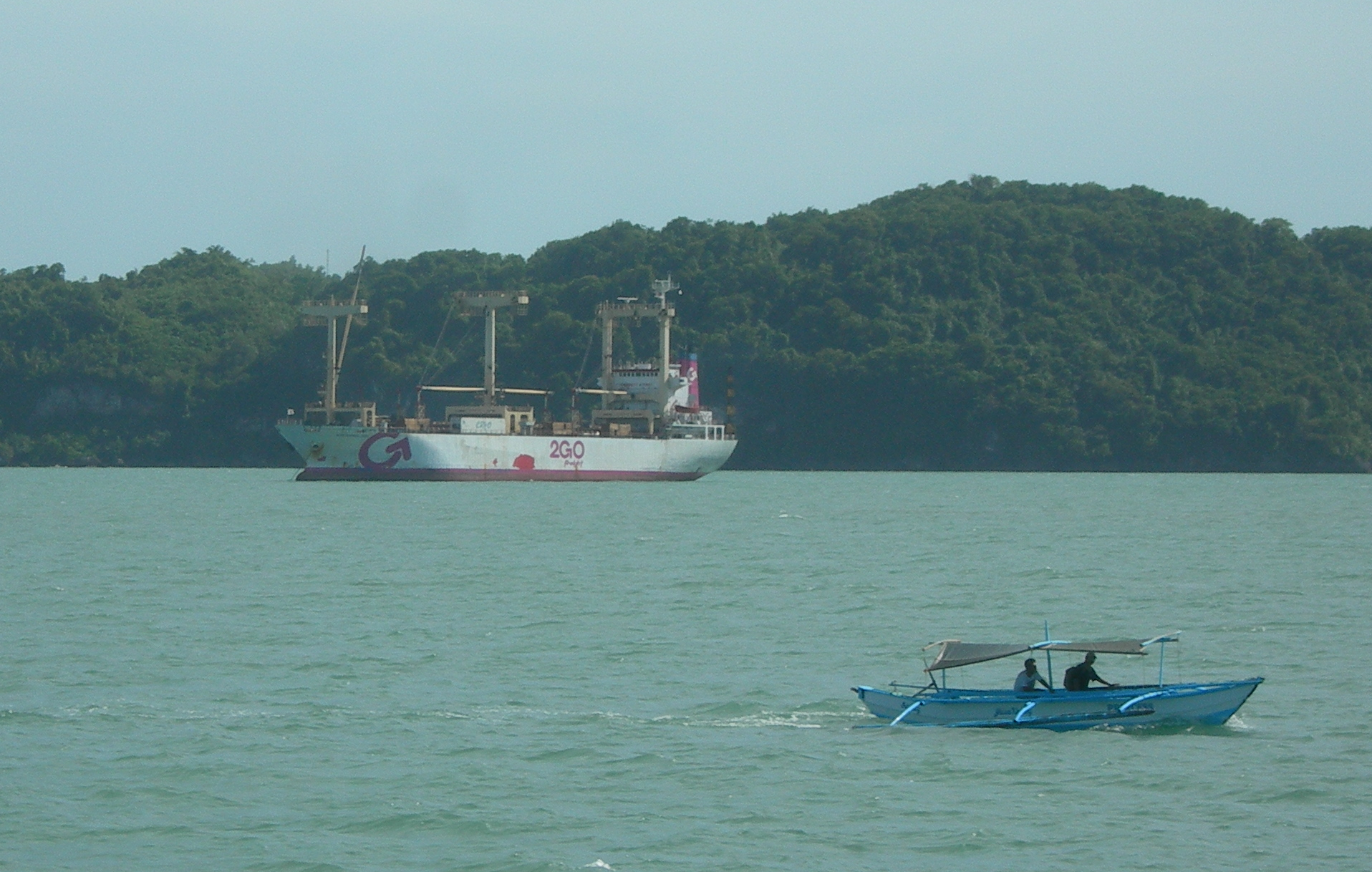
A cargo ship of 2GO Freight in the Iloilo Strait, with a pump boat and Guimaras Island in the background.

The Port of Iloilo was opened for international trade in 1855 and the coming of British Vice-consul Nicholas Loney, a year later, led to the fast development of the sugar industry in the region.

=== Incidents ===
2GO Travel's ferry St. Gregory The Great nearly capsized on 15 June 2013, when it struck rocks under the water near the Siete Picados Islands.

=== Iloilo Strait sinkings ===
On August 3, 2019, two motor boats "Chi-chi" and "Keziah 2" bound for Jordan, Guimaras capsized due to strong southwest monsoon winds enhanced by Typhoon Lekima (Hanna). Hours later, the motorboat "Jenny Vince" bound for Buenavista, Guimaras, also capsized due to strong winds. Thirty-one passengers died.

=== 2020 Oil Spill ===
On July 3, 2020, a power barge of the National Power Corporation (NAPOCOR) exploded, spilling an estimated 251,000 liters of fuel. About 400 residents were evacuated. Some 179,300 liters of bunker fuel were collected from the water's surface on Sunday, according to a report by the Coast Guard station in Iloilo.

== See also ==
- List of East Asian ports
