= 2022 Philippine local elections in Western Visayas =

- May 9, 2022
- Gubernatorial elections
- 6 provincial governors and 2 city mayors
Party	Seats	+/–
NUP	4	+2
PDP–Laban	2	−1
Lakas	1	+1
NPC	1	−1
This lists parties that won seats. See the complete results below.
- Vice gubernatorial elections
- 6 provincial vice governors and 2 city vice mayors
Party	Seats	+/–
Nacionalista	3	+1
NUP	2	0
Lakas	1	+1
NPC	1	0
PDP–Laban	1	0
This lists parties that won seats. See the complete results below.
- Provincial Board elections
- 60 provincial board members and 24 city councilors
Party	Seats	+/–
PDP–Laban	19	+2
NUP	16	+2
NPC	15	−4
Nacionalista	12	−2
Lakas	7	+7
Liberal	5	−3
Aksyon	2	New
PROMDI	2	New
UNegA	2	−1
LDP	1	New
Independent	3	−5
This lists parties that won seats. See the complete results below.

The 2022 Philippine local elections in Western Visayas were held on May 9, 2022.

== Summary ==
=== Governors ===
Province/city	Incumbent	Incumbent's party	Winner	Winner's party	Winning margin
Aklan	Florencio Miraflores	PDP–Laban	Jose Enrique Miraflores	PDP–Laban	27.14%
Antique	Rhodora Cadiao	NUP	Rhodora Cadiao	NUP	52.58%
Bacolod (HUC)	Evelio Leonardia	Nacionalista	Albee Benitez	PDP–Laban	23.08%
Capiz	Esteban Evan Contreras	PDP–Laban	Fredenil Castro	Lakas	25.02%
Guimaras	Samuel Gumarin	PDP–Laban	JC Rahman Nava	NUP	93.20%
Iloilo	Arthur Defensor Jr.	NUP	Arthur Defensor Jr.	NUP	94.36%
Iloilo City (HUC)	Jerry Treñas	NUP	Jerry Treñas	NUP	54.78%
Negros Occidental	Bong Lacson	NPC	Bong Lacson	NPC	86.90%

=== Vice governors ===
Province/city	Incumbent	Incumbent's party	Winner	Winner's party	Winning margin
Aklan	Boy Quimpo	Nacionalista	Boy Quimpo	Nacionalista	17.47%
Antique	Edgar Denosta	NPC	Edgar Denosta	NPC	13.66%
Bacolod (HUC)	El Cid Familiaran	Nacionalista	El Cid Familiaran	Nacionalista	9.71%
Capiz	Jaime Magbanua	Lakas	Jaime Magbanua	Lakas	17.65%
Guimaras	Edward Gando	PDP–Laban	Edward Gando	PDP–Laban	26.82%
Iloilo	Tingting Garin	Nacionalista	Tingting Garin	Nacionalista	Unopposed
Iloilo City (HUC)	Jeffrey Ganzon	NUP	Jeffrey Ganzon	NUP	59.60%
Negros Occidental	Jeffrey Ferrer	NUP	Jeffrey Ferrer	NUP	84.12%

=== Provincial boards ===
Province/city	Seats	Party control		Composition
Province/city	Seats	Previous	Result	Composition
Aklan	10 elected 3 ex-officio	PDP–Laban	No majority	Nacionalista (4); PDP–Laban (4); NPC (2)
Antique	10 elected 3 ex-officio	No majority	No majority	NPC (4); PDP–Laban (3); Aksyon (1); Lakas (1); Independent (1)
Bacolod (HUC)	12 elected 2 ex-officio	No majority	No majority	Nacionalista (4); PDP–Laban (3); NPC (2); PROMDI (1); Lakas (1); Independent (1)
Capiz	10 elected 3 ex-officio	Liberal	No majority	Liberal (4); PDP–Laban (3); Lakas (3)
Guimaras	8 elected 3 ex-officio	PDP–Laban	No majority	PDP–Laban (5); NUP (3)
Iloilo	10 elected 3 ex-officio	Nacionalista	No majority	Nacionalista (4); NUP (2); Lakas (2); Liberal (1); Aksyon (1)
Iloilo City (HUC)	12 elected 2 ex-officio	No majority	NUP	NUP (10); PROMDI (1); LDP (1)
Negros Occidental	12 elected 3 ex-officio	No majority	No majority	NPC (7); UNegA (2); PDP–Laban (1); NUP (1); Independent (1)

== Aklan ==
=== Governor ===
Incumbent Governor Florencio Miraflores of PDP–Laban was term-limited.

PDP–Laban nominated Miraflores' son, Ibajay mayor Jose Enrique Miraflores, who won against former Kalibo mayor William Lachica (Kilusang Bagong Lipunan) and two other candidates.

Candidate	Party	Votes	%
Jose Enrique Miraflores	PDP–Laban	196,897	62.97
William Lachica	Kilusang Bagong Lipunan	112,053	35.83
Willie Tolentino	Independent	2,759	0.88
Rayam Torres	Independent	992	0.32
Total		312,701	100.00
Total votes		353,272	–
Registered voters/turnout		409,938	86.18
PDP–Laban hold			
Source: Commission on Elections

=== Vice Governor ===
Incumbent Vice Governor Boy Quimpo of the Nacionalista Party ran for a third term.

Quimpo won re-election against Jonathan Cabrera (People's Reform Party) and provincial board member Nolly Sodusta (Partido para sa Demokratikong Reporma).

Candidate	Party	Votes	%
Boy Quimpo (incumbent)	Nacionalista Party	143,761	48.63
Jonathan Cabrera	People's Reform Party	92,127	31.16
Nolly Sodusta	Partido para sa Demokratikong Reporma	59,746	20.21
Total		295,634	100.00
Total votes		353,272	–
Registered voters/turnout		409,938	86.18
Nacionalista hold			
Source: Commission on Elections

=== Provincial Board ===
The Aklan Provincial Board is composed of 13 board members, 10 of whom are elected.

The Nacionalista Party tied with PDP–Laban at four seats each.

Party	Votes	%	Seats	+/–
Nacionalista Party	326,903	29.46	4	+3
PDP–Laban	300,654	27.09	4	–3
Nationalist People's Coalition	136,887	12.33	2	0
Aksyon Demokratiko	98,280	8.86	0	New
Kilusang Bagong Lipunan	53,969	4.86	0	New
PROMDI	46,645	4.20	0	New
People's Reform Party	34,470	3.11	0	New
National Unity Party	30,147	2.72	0	New
Partido para sa Demokratikong Reporma	16,175	1.46	0	New
Partido Pederal ng Maharlika	2,774	0.25	0	New
Independent	62,850	5.66	0	0
Total	1,109,754	100.00	10	0
Total votes	353,272	–		
Registered voters/turnout	409,938	86.18		

==== 1st district ====
Aklan's 1st provincial district consists of the same area as Aklan's 1st legislative district. Five board members are elected from this provincial district.

15 candidates were included in the ballot.

Candidate	Party	Votes	%
Ampod Neron (incumbent)	Nationalist People's Coalition	87,724	15.01
Mark Quimpo	Nacionalista Party	87,302	14.94
Mark Ace Bautista	Nacionalista Party	84,070	14.39
Teddy Tupas	PDP–Laban	57,594	9.86
Apol Cleope	Nationalist People's Coalition	49,163	8.41
Raul Sucgang	Aksyon Demokratiko	35,857	6.14
Axel Gonzalez	People's Reform Party	34,470	5.90
Ramy Panagsagan	Aksyon Demokratiko	34,362	5.88
Chito Peralta	Kilusang Bagong Lipunan	28,661	4.91
Pier Teodosio	Aksyon Demokratiko	28,061	4.80
Conrad Indelible	Independent	25,063	4.29
Jun Agravante	Independent	19,748	3.38
Jethro Laserna	Independent	5,938	1.02
Boyblas Carrillo	Independent	3,502	0.60
Geraldo Meduranda	Partido Pederal ng Maharlika	2,774	0.47
Total		584,289	100.00
Total votes		180,243	–
Registered voters/turnout		209,315	86.11
Source: Commission on Elections

==== 2nd district ====
Aklan's 2nd provincial district consists of the same area as Aklan's 2nd legislative district. Five board members are elected from this provincial district.

10 candidates were included in the ballot.

Candidate	Party	Votes	%
Jay Tejada (incumbent)	PDP–Laban	97,017	18.46
Lolong Dalisay	Nacionalista Party	81,725	15.55
Jupiter Gallenero	PDP–Laban	78,267	14.89
Jojo Cordova	Nacionalista Party	73,806	14.05
Larry Solidum	PDP–Laban	67,776	12.90
Jun Garcia	PROMDI	46,645	8.88
Royden Perlas	National Unity Party	30,147	5.74
Lucita de Asis-Necor	Kilusang Bagong Lipunan	25,308	4.82
Jun Tanumtanum	Partido para sa Demokratikong Reporma	16,175	3.08
Reynaldo Emperado	Independent	8,599	1.64
Total		525,465	100.00
Total votes		173,029	–
Registered voters/turnout		200,623	86.25
Source: Commission on Elections

== Antique ==
=== Governor ===
Incumbent Governor Rhodora Cadiao of the National Unity Party ran for a third term.

Cadiao won re-election against two other candidates.

Candidate	Party	Votes	%
Rhodora Cadiao (incumbent)	National Unity Party	217,573	75.58
Vic Fedelicio	PDP–Laban	66,207	23.00
Mayong Petinglay	Independent	4,085	1.42
Total		287,865	100.00
Total votes		338,242	–
Registered voters/turnout		387,998	87.18
NUP hold			
Source: Commission on Elections

=== Vice Governor ===
Incumbent Vice Governor Edgar Denosta of the Nationalist People's Coalition ran for a third term.

Denosta won re-election against Nonoy Tajanlangit (PDP–Laban) and provincial board member Vincent Piccio III (Aksyon Demokratiko).

Candidate	Party	Votes	%
Edgar Denosta (incumbent)	Nationalist People's Coalition	135,955	49.16
Nonoy Tajanlangit	PDP–Laban	98,163	35.50
Vincent Piccio III	Aksyon Demokratiko	42,425	15.34
Total		276,543	100.00
Total votes		338,242	–
Registered voters/turnout		387,998	87.18
NPC hold			
Source: Commission on Elections

=== Provincial Board ===
The Antique Provincial Board is composed of 13 board members, 10 of whom are elected.

The Nationalist People's Coalition won four seats, remaining as the largest party in the provincial board.

Party	Votes	%	Seats	+/–
Nationalist People's Coalition	367,498	35.59	4	0
PDP–Laban	306,145	29.65	3	+3
Aksyon Demokratiko	79,637	7.71	1	New
Lakas–CMD	63,270	6.13	1	New
Partido Federal ng Pilipinas	45,398	4.40	0	New
People's Reform Party	13,503	1.31	0	New
Independent	157,244	15.23	1	–1
Total	1,032,695	100.00	10	0
Total votes	338,242	–		
Registered voters/turnout	387,998	87.18		

==== 1st district ====
Antique's 1st provincial district consists of the municipalities of Anini-y, Belison, Hamtic, San Jose de Buenavista, San Remigio, Sibalom,Tobias Fornier and Valderrama. Five board members are elected from this provincial district.

13 candidates were included in the ballot.

Candidate	Party	Votes	%
Nene Maye Plameras (incumbent)	Aksyon Demokratiko	79,637	14.84
Rony Molina	PDP–Laban	79,427	14.80
Dante Beriong	Independent	69,810	13.00
Dondon Odango Niquia (incumbent)	Nationalist People's Coalition	64,484	12.01
Pio Sumande (incumbent)	Nationalist People's Coalition	61,272	11.41
Fernando Corvera Sr. (incumbent)	Nationalist People's Coalition	56,128	10.46
Eduardo Fortaleza	PDP–Laban	35,204	6.56
Felix Saldajeno	PDP–Laban	25,931	4.83
Grande Orquia	PDP–Laban	18,190	3.39
Robin Rubinos	Independent	17,482	3.26
Melmar Ovivir	Independent	15,307	2.85
Joseph Ortega	Independent	11,214	2.09
Junie Loquinario	Independent	2,731	0.51
Total		536,817	100.00
Total votes		165,348	–
Registered voters/turnout		188,573	87.68
Source: Commission on Elections

==== 2nd district ====
Antique's 2nd provincial district consists of the municipalities of Barbaza, Bugasong, Caluya, Culasi, Laua-an, Libertad, Pandan, Patnongon, Sebaste and Tibiao. Five board members are elected from this provincial district.

12 candidates were included in the ballot.

Candidate	Party	Votes	%
Victor Condez (incumbent)	Nationalist People's Coalition	72,285	14.58
Noel Alamis (incumbent)	Nationalist People's Coalition	71,451	14.41
Milay Dimamay (incumbent)	PDP–Laban	70,585	14.23
Sueki Palacios (incumbent)	Lakas–CMD	63,270	12.76
Egidio Elio	PDP–Laban	52,570	10.60
Kapnonong Alojipan	Partido Federal ng Pilipinas	45,398	9.16
Gigi Bautista-Dioso	Nationalist People's Coalition	41,878	8.45
Toto Hec Frangue	Independent	33,609	6.78
Berting Raymundo	PDP–Laban	14,594	2.94
Nervin Dioso	People's Reform Party	13,503	2.72
Nenebelen dela Torre	PDP–Laban	9,644	1.94
Hagibis Pacheco	Independent	7,091	1.43
Total		495,878	100.00
Total votes		172,894	–
Registered voters/turnout		199,425	86.70
Source: Commission on Elections

== Bacolod ==
=== Mayor ===
Incumbent Mayor Evelio Leonardia of the Nacionalista Party ran for a third term. He was previously affiliated with the Nationalist People's Coalition.

Leonardia was defeated by former Negros Occidental's 3rd district representative Albee Benitez of PDP–Laban.

Candidate	Party	Votes	%
Albee Benitez	PDP–Laban	171,893	61.54
Evelio Leonardia (incumbent)	Nacionalista Party	107,447	38.46
Total		279,340	100.00
Total votes		290,202	–
Registered voters/turnout		327,403	88.64
PDP–Laban gain from Nacionalista			
Source: Commission on Elections

=== Vice Mayor ===
Incumbent Vice Mayor El Cid Familiaran of the Nacionalista Party ran for a third term. He was previously an independent.

Familiaran won re-election against former city councilor Caesar Distrito (PDP–Laban) and city councilor Wilson Gamboa Jr. (Independent).

Candidate	Party	Votes	%
El Cid Familiaran (incumbent)	Nacionalista Party	128,893	48.79
Caesar Distrito	PDP–Laban	103,236	39.08
Wilson Gamboa Jr.	Independent	32,033	12.13
Total		264,162	100.00
Total votes		290,202	–
Registered voters/turnout		327,403	88.64
Nacionalista hold			
Source: Commission on Elections

=== City Council ===
The Bacolod City Council consists of 14 councilors, 12 of whom are elected.

38 candidates were included in the ballot.

The Nacionalista Party won four seats, becoming the largest party in the city council.

Party	Votes	%	Seats	+/–
Nacionalista Party	925,081	35.31	4	+2
PDP–Laban	634,331	24.21	3	New
Nationalist People's Coalition	334,316	12.76	2	–3
PROMDI	203,395	7.76	1	New
Lakas–CMD	111,027	4.24	1	+1
United Negros Alliance	87,873	3.35	0	New
Aksyon Demokratiko	68,915	2.63	0	New
Partido Pederal ng Maharlika	19,249	0.73	0	New
People's Reform Party	10,458	0.40	0	New
Independent	224,942	8.59	1	–3
Total	2,619,587	100.00	12	0
Total votes	290,202	–		
Registered voters/turnout	327,403	88.64		

Candidate	Party	Votes	%
Thaddy Sayson	PDP–Laban	134,635	5.14
Israel Salanga (incumbent)	Nacionalista Party	123,237	4.70
Cindy Rojas (incumbent)	Nacionalista Party	122,629	4.68
Em Ang	Nacionalista Party	116,953	4.46
Al Espino (incumbent)	Nationalist People's Coalition	115,197	4.40
Vladi Gonzalez	PDP–Laban	113,145	4.32
Renecito Novero (incumbent)	Nacionalista Party	113,046	4.32
Jason Villarosa	Lakas–CMD	111,027	4.24
Kalaw Puentevella	PROMDI	108,950	4.16
Simple Distrito (incumbent)	PDP–Laban	107,030	4.09
Celia Flor	Independent	103,768	3.96
Pao Sy (incumbent)	Nationalist People's Coalition	98,978	3.78
Archie Baribar (incumbent)	PROMDI	94,445	3.61
Bart Orola (incumbent)	PDP–Laban	94,230	3.60
Homer Bais	PDP–Laban	94,030	3.59
Dindo Ramos (incumbent)	Nacionalista Party	94,026	3.59
Patrick Lacson	PDP–Laban	91,261	3.48
Sonya Verdeflor	United Negros Alliance	87,873	3.35
Carl Lopez (incumbent)	Nacionalista Party	83,226	3.18
Marlon Solidum	Nationalist People's Coalition	81,793	3.12
Chris Sorongon	Nacionalista Party	81,548	3.11
Cash Montalvo	Nacionalista Party	70,472	2.69
Ricardo Tan	Aksyon Demokratiko	68,915	2.63
Ed Guillem	Nacionalista Party	65,300	2.49
Jonathan Diaz Jr.	Nacionalista Party	54,644	2.09
Mark Steven Mayo	Nationalist People's Coalition	38,348	1.46
Cesar Beloria Jr.	Independent	28,855	1.10
Rico Villafuerte	Independent	20,075	0.77
Eduardo Padios	Partido Pederal ng Maharlika	19,249	0.73
Alan Arroyo	Independent	15,264	0.58
Christian Weber	Independent	12,523	0.48
Bong Hermosura	Independent	10,917	0.42
LR Contreras	People's Reform Party	10,458	0.40
Vic Gico	Independent	8,373	0.32
Jiffy Jauod	Independent	7,096	0.27
Kenneth Ian Belario	Independent	6,878	0.26
Fermin Nacionales	Independent	5,986	0.23
Joel Aujero	Independent	5,207	0.20
Total		2,619,587	100.00
Total votes		290,202	–
Registered voters/turnout		327,403	88.64
Source: Commission on Elections

== Capiz ==
=== Governor ===
Incumbent Governor Esteban Evan Contreras of PDP–Laban ran for a second term. He was previously an independent.

Contreras was defeated by representative Fredenil Castro of Lakas–CMD. Elmer Villasis (Partido Federal ng Pilipinas) also ran for governor.

Candidate	Party	Votes	%
Fredenil Castro	Lakas–CMD	253,074	62.18
Esteban Evan Contreras (incumbent)	PDP–Laban	151,218	37.16
Elmer Villasis	Partido Federal ng Pilipinas	2,695	0.66
Total		406,987	100.00
Total votes		456,474	–
Registered voters/turnout		529,079	86.28
Lakas gain from PDP–Laban			
Source: Commission on Elections

=== Vice Governor ===
Incumbent Vice Governor Jaime Magbanua of Lakas–CMD ran for a second term. He was previously affiliated with the National Unity Party.

Magbanua won re-election against former governor Vic Tanco (PDP–Laban) and two other candidates.

Candidate	Party	Votes	%
Jaime Magbanua (incumbent)	Lakas–CMD	204,413	57.24
Vic Tanco	PDP–Laban	141,377	39.59
Reymar Xavier Pimentel	Independent	6,929	1.94
Ricardo Bascos	Partido Federal ng Pilipinas	4,397	1.23
Total		357,116	100.00
Total votes		456,474	–
Registered voters/turnout		529,079	86.28
Lakas hold			
Source: Commission on Elections

=== Provincial Board ===
The Capiz Provincial Board is composed of 13 board members, 10 of whom are elected.

The Liberal Party remained as the largest party in the provincial board with four seats, but lost its majority.

Party	Votes	%	Seats	+/–
PDP–Laban	524,046	37.87	3	New
Liberal Party	387,553	28.01	4	–4
Lakas–CMD	296,982	21.46	3	+3
United Nationalist Alliance	21,155	1.53	0	New
People's Reform Party	14,441	1.04	0	New
Pederalismo ng Dugong Dakilang Samahan	11,698	0.85	0	0
Partido Federal ng Pilipinas	10,617	0.77	0	0
Partido Pederal ng Maharlika	6,292	0.45	0	New
Independent	110,893	8.01	0	0
Total	1,383,677	100.00	10	0
Total votes	456,474	–		
Registered voters/turnout	529,079	86.28		

==== 1st district ====
Capiz's 1st provincial district consists of the same area as Capiz's 1st legislative district. Five board members are elected from this provincial district.

15 candidates were included in the ballot.

Candidate	Party	Votes	%
Pepe del Rosario	Liberal Party	102,600	13.18
Sonny Besa (incumbent)	Liberal Party	87,613	11.25
Gingging Almalbis	PDP–Laban	87,210	11.20
Thea Faith Reyes (incumbent)	Liberal Party	73,109	9.39
Trina Marie Ignacio	Liberal Party	66,576	8.55
Gualberto Bernas III	PDP–Laban	63,350	8.14
Cesar Yap Jr.	Independent	59,263	7.61
Tambol Apolinario (incumbent)	Liberal Party	57,655	7.41
Remia Fuentes-Bartolome	Independent	46,328	5.95
Eduardo Magallanes	PDP–Laban	45,958	5.90
Byron Delfin	PDP–Laban	38,625	4.96
Ting Borda	PDP–Laban	24,267	3.12
Pancho dela Cruz	People's Reform Party	14,441	1.85
Doming Belonio	Partido Pederal ng Maharlika	6,292	0.81
Ruel Diaz	Independent	5,302	0.68
Total		778,589	100.00
Total votes		242,273	–
Registered voters/turnout		280,436	86.39
Source: Commission on Elections

==== 2nd district ====
Capiz's 2nd provincial district consists of the same area as Capiz's 2nd legislative district. Five board members are elected from this provincial district.

15 candidates were included in the ballot.

Candidate	Party	Votes	%
Nonoy Arevalo (incumbent)	Lakas–CMD	91,136	15.06
Gilbert Ardivilla	Lakas–CMD	77,643	12.83
Aldwin Cruz-Am	PDP–Laban	68,580	11.33
Inday San Felix	PDP–Laban	67,823	11.21
Celio Fecundo	Lakas–CMD	64,269	10.62
Baden Cantiller	Lakas–CMD	63,934	10.57
Bord Layo	PDP–Laban	56,652	9.36
Julz Gustilo	PDP–Laban	40,598	6.71
Bugs Baguio	PDP–Laban	30,983	5.12
Mimi Ardivilla	United Nationalist Alliance	21,155	3.50
Eleazar Dile	Partido Federal ng Pilipinas	5,978	0.99
Bayani Sera Jose	Partido Federal ng Pilipinas	4,639	0.77
Nilo Esporma	Pederalismo ng Dugong Dakilang Samahan	4,215	0.70
Doydo Ortencio	Pederalismo ng Dugong Dakilang Samahan	4,181	0.69
Vicente Nabor	Pederalismo ng Dugong Dakilang Samahan	3,302	0.55
Total		605,088	100.00
Total votes		214,201	–
Registered voters/turnout		248,643	86.15
Source: Commission on Elections

== Guimaras ==
=== Governor ===
Term-limited incumbent Governor Samuel Gumarin of PDP–Laban ran for mayor of Buenavista.

Gumarin endorsed former representative JC Rahman Nava (National Unity Party), who won the election against Jose Ramon Cacho (Kilusang Bagong Lipunan).

Candidate	Party	Votes	%
JC Rahman Nava (incumbent)	National Unity Party	92,570	96.60
Jose Ramon Cacho	Kilusang Bagong Lipunan	3,262	3.40
Total		95,832	100.00
Total votes		107,885	–
Registered voters/turnout		124,076	86.95
NUP gain PDP–Laban			
Source: Commission on Elections

=== Vice Governor ===
Incumbent Vice Governor Edward Gando of PDP–Laban ran for a third term.

Gando won re-election against former Guimaras vice governor Etik de Asis (Partido Federal ng Pilipinas).

Candidate	Party	Votes	%
Edward Gando (incumbent)	PDP–Laban	57,746	63.41
Etik de Asis	Partido Federal ng Pilipinas	33,319	36.59
Total		91,065	100.00
Total votes		107,885	–
Registered voters/turnout		124,076	86.95
PDP–Laban hold			
Source: Commission on Elections

=== Provincial Board ===
The Guimaras Provincial Board is composed of 11 board members, eight of whom are elected.

PDP–Laban remained as the largest party in the provincial board with five seats, but lost its majority.

Party	Votes	%	Seats	+/–
PDP–Laban	140,161	50.25	5	–3
National Unity Party	117,536	42.14	3	New
Partido Federal ng Pilipinas	17,507	6.28	0	0
PROMDI	3,736	1.34	0	New
Total	278,940	100.00	8	0
Total votes	107,885	–		
Registered voters/turnout	124,076	86.95		

==== 1st district ====
Guimaras' 1st provincial district consists of the municipalities of Buenavista and San Lorenzo. Four board members are elected from this provincial district.

Six candidates were included in the ballot.

Candidate	Party	Votes	%
Cecile Gumarin	PDP–Laban	35,927	28.99
Apoy Tionado (incumbent)	PDP–Laban	28,951	23.36
Boking Habaña	PDP–Laban	22,295	17.99
Raymond Gavileño (incumbent)	PDP–Laban	19,250	15.53
Roger Artajo	Partido Federal ng Pilipinas	12,118	9.78
Pykes Talabero	Partido Federal ng Pilipinas	5,389	4.35
Total		123,930	100.00
Total votes		48,220	–
Registered voters/turnout		55,065	87.57
Source: Commission on Elections

==== 2nd district ====
Guimaras' 2nd provincial district consists of the municipalities of Jordan, Nueva Valencia and Sibunag. Four board members are elected from this provincial district.

Five candidates were included in the ballot.

Candidate	Party	Votes	%
Nene Nava	National Unity Party	49,004	31.61
Alex Araneta	National Unity Party	36,149	23.32
Luben Vilches (incumbent)	PDP–Laban	33,738	21.77
Lynlyn Edang	National Unity Party	32,383	20.89
Boy Callado	PROMDI	3,736	2.41
Total		155,010	100.00
Total votes		59,665	–
Registered voters/turnout		69,011	86.46
Source: Commission on Elections

== Iloilo ==
=== Governor ===
Incumbent Governor Arthur Defensor Jr. of the National Unity Party ran for a second term. He was previously affiliated with PDP–Laban.

Defensor won re-election against Noli Gil (Independent).

Candidate	Party	Votes	%
Arthur Defensor Jr. (incumbent)	National Unity Party	891,980	97.18
Noli Gil	Independent	25,919	2.82
Total		917,899	100.00
Total votes		1,122,301	–
Registered voters/turnout		1,298,282	86.45
NUP hold			
Source: Commission on Elections

=== Vice Governor ===
Incumbent Vice Governor Tingting Garin of the Nacionalista Party won re-election for a third term unopposed.

Candidate	Party	Votes	%
Tingting Garin (incumbent)	Nacionalista	725,282	100.00
Total		725,282	100.00
Total votes		1,122,301	–
Registered voters/turnout		1,298,282	86.45
Nacionalista hold			
Source: Commission on Elections

=== Provincial Board ===
The Iloilo Provincial Board is composed of 13 board members, 10 of whom are elected.

The Nacionalista Party remained as the largest party with four seats, but lost its majority.

Party	Votes	%	Seats	+/–
Nacionalista Party	518,213	41.08	4	–3
National Unity Party	288,003	22.83	2	New
Lakas–CMD	184,743	14.64	2	New
Liberal Party	109,790	8.70	1	+1
Aksyon Demokratiko	99,585	7.89	1	New
Partido Federal ng Pilipinas	43,326	3.43	0	New
Independent	17,965	1.42	0	–1
Total	1,261,625	100.00	10	0
Total votes	1,122,301	–		
Registered voters/turnout	1,298,282	86.45		
Source: Commission on Elections

==== 1st district ====
Iloilo's 1st provincial district consists of the same area as Iloilo's 1st legislative district. Two board members are elected from this provincial district.

Four candidates were included in the ballot.

Candidate	Party	Votes	%
Val Serag (incumbent)	Lakas–CMD	93,741	36.15
Carmelo Nochete	Lakas–CMD	91,002	35.10
Dennis Valencia	National Unity Party	56,579	21.82
Elston Saquian	Independent	17,965	6.93
Total		259,287	100.00
Total votes		199,035	–
Registered voters/turnout		228,690	87.03
Source: Commission on Elections

==== 2nd district ====
Iloilo's 2nd provincial district consists of the same area as Iloilo's 2nd legislative district. Two board members are elected from this provincial district.

Two candidates were included in the ballot.

Candidate	Party	Votes	%
June Mondejar (incumbent)	National Unity Party	111,048	59.01
Rolito Cajilig (incumbent)	Nacionalista Party	77,130	40.99
Total		188,178	100.00
Total votes		195,525	–
Registered voters/turnout		222,230	87.98
Source: Commission on Elections

==== 3rd district ====
Iloilo's 3rd provincial district consists of the same area as Iloilo's 3rd legislative district. Two board members are elected from this provincial district.

Two candidates were included in the ballot.

Candidate	Party	Votes	%
Matt Palabrica (incumbent)	National Unity Party	120,376	52.30
Jason Gonzales (incumbent)	Liberal Party	109,790	47.70
Total		230,166	100.00
Total votes		232,766	–
Registered voters/turnout		273,797	85.01
Source: Commission on Elections

==== 4th district ====
Iloilo's 4th provincial district consists of the same area as Iloilo's 4th legislative district. Two board members are elected from this provincial district.

Two candidates were included in the ballot.

Candidate	Party	Votes	%
Domingo Oso Jr. (incumbent)	Nacionalista Party	116,325	51.19
Rolly Distura (incumbent)	Nacionalista Party	110,909	48.81
Total		227,234	100.00
Total votes		227,756	–
Registered voters/turnout		261,174	87.20
Source: Commission on Elections

==== 5th district ====
Iloilo's 5th provincial district consists of the same area as Iloilo's 5th legislative district. Two board members are elected from this provincial district.

Four candidates were included in the ballot.

Candidate	Party	Votes	%
Binky Tupas	Nacionalista Party	147,642	41.38
Carol V Espinosa-Diaz (incumbent)	Aksyon Demokratiko	99,585	27.91
Aris Tedoco	Nacionalista Party	66,207	18.56
Tweety Tupas	Partido Federal ng Pilipinas	43,326	12.14
Total		356,760	100.00
Total votes		267,219	–
Registered voters/turnout		312,391	85.54
Source: Commission on Elections

== Iloilo City ==
=== Mayor ===
Incumbent Mayor Jerry Treñas of the National Unity Party ran for a second term.

Treñas won re-election against two other candidates.

Candidate	Party	Votes	%
Jerry Treñas (incumbent)	National Unity Party	187,691	77.23
Jun Capulot	People's Reform Party	54,552	22.45
Vicente Ang	Independent	789	0.32
Total		243,032	100.00
Total votes		259,575	–
Registered voters/turnout		330,470	78.55
NUP hold			
Source: Commission on Elections

=== Vice Mayor ===
Incumbent Vice Mayor Jeffrey Ganzon of the National Unity Party ran for a second term. He was previously an independent.

Ganzon won re-election against Kayser Jadulos (People's Reform Party).

Candidate	Party	Votes	%
Jeffrey Ganzon (incumbent)	National Unity Party	164,570	79.80
Kayser Jadulos	People's Reform Party	41,667	20.20
Total		206,237	100.00
Total votes		259,575	–
Registered voters/turnout		330,470	78.55

=== City Council ===
The Iloilo City Council is composed of 14 councilors, 12 of whom are elected.

28 candidates were included in the ballot.

The National Unity Party won 10 seats, gaining a majority in the city council.

Party	Votes	%	Seats	+/–
National Unity Party	1,358,786	66.78	10	+3
Partido Federal ng Pilipinas	117,985	5.80	0	0
PROMDI	117,708	5.79	1	New
Laban ng Demokratikong Pilipino	106,523	5.24	1	New
Nacionalista Party	88,689	4.36	0	–4
Uswag Ilonggo	84,345	4.15	0	New
Independent	160,632	7.89	0	–1
Total	2,034,668	100.00	12	0
Total votes	259,575	–		
Registered voters/turnout	330,470	78.55		
Source: Commission on Elections

Candidate	Party	Votes	%
Sedfrey Cabaluna	National Unity Party	144,328	7.09
Miguel Treñas	National Unity Party	131,882	6.48
Alan Zaldivar (incumbent)	National Unity Party	129,615	6.37
Frances Grace Parcon	National Unity Party	128,463	6.31
Nick Baronda	National Unity Party	122,359	6.01
Rudolph Ganzon (incumbent)	National Unity Party	115,445	5.67
Rex Sarabia	National Unity Party	111,852	5.50
Candice Tupas (incumbent)	Laban ng Demokratikong Pilipino	106,523	5.24
Johnny Young	National Unity Party	105,844	5.20
Romel Duron (incumbent)	National Unity Party	103,674	5.10
Ely Estante Jr. (incumbent)	National Unity Party	102,928	5.06
Plaridel Nava	PROMDI	101,105	4.97
Joshua Alim	Partido Federal ng Pilipinas	92,724	4.56
Jojo Javellana (incumbent)	National Unity Party	91,725	4.51
Mandrie Malabor (incumbent)	Uswag Ilonggo	84,345	4.15
Lyndon Acap (incumbent)	Nacionalista Party	73,981	3.64
John Eric David	National Unity Party	70,671	3.47
Nene dela Llana	Independent	55,456	2.73
Mor Espinosa	Independent	34,594	1.70
Mel Carreon	Independent	27,514	1.35
Peter Abadiano	Independent	26,570	1.31
Ed Pama	PROMDI	16,603	0.82
Romel Flogen	Nacionalista Party	14,708	0.72
Rovelson Bagares	Independent	11,236	0.55
Philip Cendaña	Partido Federal ng Pilipinas	9,111	0.45
Rich Piad	Partido Federal ng Pilipinas	8,823	0.43
Efren Gimeo	Partido Federal ng Pilipinas	7,327	0.36
Vic Anoche	Independent	5,262	0.26
Total		2,034,668	100.00
Total votes		259,575	–
Registered voters/turnout		330,470	78.55
Source: Commission on Elections

== Negros Occidental ==
=== Governor ===
Incumbent Governor Bong Lacson of the Nationalist People's Coalition ran for a second term.

Lacson won re-election against two other candidates.

Candidate	Party	Votes	%
Bong Lacson (incumbent)	Nationalist People's Coalition	935,079	92.63
Juan Orola Jr.	Pederalismo ng Dugong Dakilang Samahan	57,845	5.73
Maria Socorro Sibulan	Independent	16,579	1.64
Total		1,009,503	100.00
Total votes		1,354,305	–
Registered voters/turnout		1,619,236	83.64
NPC hold			
Source: Commission on Elections

=== Vice Governor ===
Incumbent Vice Governor Jeffrey Ferrer of the National Unity Party ran for a second term.

Ferrer won re-election against Jonry Gargarita (Independent).

Candidate	Party	Votes	%
Jeffrey Ferrer (incumbent)	National Unity Party	818,245	92.06
Jonry Gargarita	Independent	70,531	7.94
Total		888,776	100.00
Total votes		1,354,305	–
Registered voters/turnout		1,619,236	83.64
NUP hold			
Source: Commission on Elections

=== Provincial Board ===
The Negros Occidental Provincial Board is composed of 15 board members, 12 of whom are elected.

The Nationalist People's Coalition remained as the largest party in the provincial board with seven seats.

Party	Votes	%	Seats	+/–
Nationalist People's Coalition	760,063	54.99	7	0
United Negros Alliance	168,385	12.18	2	–1
PDP–Laban	118,874	8.60	1	0
National Unity Party	101,271	7.33	1	0
Lakas–CMD	48,943	3.54	0	New
Pederalismo ng Dugong Dakilang Samahan	43,700	3.16	0	New
Independent	140,825	10.19	1	+1
Total	1,382,061	100.00	12	0
Total votes	1,354,305	–		
Registered voters/turnout	1,619,236	83.64		

==== 1st district ====
Negros Occidental's 1st provincial district consists of the same area as Negros Occidental's 1st legislative district. Two board members are elected from this provincial district.

Two candidates were included in the ballot.

Candidate	Party	Votes	%
Momoy Debulgado (incumbent)	Nationalist People's Coalition	106,921	56.06
Araceli Somosa (incumbent)	Nationalist People's Coalition	83,810	43.94
Total		190,731	100.00
Total votes		216,109	–
Registered voters/turnout		251,754	85.84
Source: Commission on Elections

==== 2nd district ====
Negros Occidental's 2nd provincial district consists of the same area as Negros Occidental's 2nd legislative district. Two board members are elected from this provincial district.

Two candidates were included in the ballot.

Candidate	Party	Votes	%
Pal Guanzon (incumbent)	United Negros Alliance	81,186	51.62
Jongben Mirhan (incumbent)	Nationalist People's Coalition	76,100	48.38
Total		157,286	100.00
Total votes		170,653	–
Registered voters/turnout		214,284	79.64
Source: Commission on Elections

==== 3rd district ====
Negros Occidental's 3rd provincial district consists of the same area as Negros Occidental's 3rd legislative district. Two board members are elected from this provincial district.

Four candidates were included in the ballot.

Candidate	Party	Votes	%
Manman Ko (incumbent)	Nationalist People's Coalition	140,400	48.95
Andrew Montelibano (incumbent)	PDP–Laban	118,874	41.44
Antonio Barello Jr.	Independent	22,790	7.95
Tukoy Occida	Independent	4,761	1.66
Total		286,825	100.00
Total votes		269,810	–
Registered voters/turnout		313,671	86.02
Source: Commission on Elections

==== 4th district ====
Negros Occidental's 4th provincial district consists of the same area as Negros Occidental's 4th legislative district. Two board members are elected from this provincial district.

Three candidates were included in the ballot.

Candidate	Party	Votes	%
Joeben Alonso (incumbent)	National Unity Party	101,271	44.11
Andrew Martin Torres	Nationalist People's Coalition	88,379	38.50
Cleo Gaudite	Pederalismo ng Dugong Dakilang Samahan	39,923	17.39
Total		229,573	100.00
Total votes		205,966	–
Registered voters/turnout		241,130	85.42
Source: Commission on Elections

==== 5th district ====
Negros Occidental's 5th provincial district consists of the same area as Negros Occidental's 5th legislative district. Two board members are elected from this provincial district.

Six candidates were included in the ballot.

Candidate	Party	Votes	%
Rita Gatuslao (incumbent)	United Negros Alliance	87,199	28.50
Anton Occeño	Independent	65,079	21.27
Hernan Emmanuel Gatuslao	Nationalist People's Coalition	52,721	17.23
Boyet Espinosa	Lakas–CMD	48,943	16.00
Patrick Miguel Montilla	Independent	48,195	15.75
Pete Bolaño	Pederalismo ng Dugong Dakilang Samahan	3,777	1.23
Total		305,914	100.00
Total votes		246,545	–
Registered voters/turnout		291,349	84.62
Source: Commission on Elections

==== 6th district ====
Negros Occidental's 6th provincial district consists of the same area as Negros Occidental's 6th legislative district. Two board members are elected from this provincial district.

Two candidates were included in the ballot.

Candidate	Party	Votes	%
Jeffrey Tubola (incumbent)	Nationalist People's Coalition	115,630	54.61
Macho Alonso (incumbent)	Nationalist People's Coalition	96,102	45.39
Total		211,732	100.00
Total votes		245,222	–
Registered voters/turnout		307,048	79.86
Source: Commission on Elections
