= 2025 Philippine House of Representatives elections in Western Visayas =

- May 12, 2025
- All 12 Western Visayas seats in the House of Representatives
Party	Seats	+/–
Lakas	5	+4
NPC	3	−2
NUP	2	−3
Nacionalista	1	−3
Independent	1	+1
This lists parties that won seats. See the complete results below.

The 2025 Philippine House of Representatives elections in Western Visayas were held on May 12, 2025, as part of the 2025 Philippine general election.

== Summary ==
Congressional district	Incumbent	Incumbent's party	Winner	Winner's party	Winning margin
Aklan–1st	Carlito Marquez	NPC	Jess Marquez	NPC	7.82%
Aklan–2nd	Teodorico Haresco Jr.	Nacionalista	Florencio Miraflores	NPC	2.03%
Antique	Antonio Legarda Jr.	NPC	Antonio Legarda Jr.	NPC	27.17%
Capiz–1st	Tawi Billones	Liberal	Howard Guintu	Independent	9.26%
Capiz–2nd	Jane Castro	Lakas	Jane Castro	Lakas	Unopposed
Guimaras	Lucille Nava	NUP	JC Rahman Nava	NUP	79.70%
Iloilo–1st	Janette Garin	Lakas	Janette Garin	Lakas	75.40%
Iloilo–2nd	Michael Gorriceta	Nacionalista	Kathy Gorriceta	Lakas	Unopposed
Iloilo–3rd	Lorenz Defensor	NUP	Lorenz Defensor	NUP	97.28%
Iloilo–4th	Ferjenel Biron	Nacionalista	Ferjenel Biron	Nacionalista	27.46%
Iloilo–5th	Raul Tupas	Lakas	Binky Tupas	Lakas	12.36%
Iloilo City	Julienne Baronda	Lakas	Julienne Baronda	Lakas	58.42%

== Aklan ==
=== 1st district ===
Incumbent Carlito Marquez of the Nationalist People's Coalition (NPC) was term-limited.

The NPC nominated Marquez' son, Jess Marquez, who won the election against former Batan mayor Rodell Ramos (Aksyon Demokratiko).

Candidate	Party	Votes	%
Jess Marquez	Nationalist People's Coalition	88,054	53.91
Rodell Ramos	Aksyon Demokratiko	75,286	46.09
Total		163,340	100.00
Valid votes		163,340	91.06
Invalid/blank votes		16,041	8.94
Total votes		179,381	100.00
Registered voters/turnout		209,532	85.61
NPC hold			
Source: Commission on Elections

=== 2nd district ===
Incumbent Teodorico Haresco Jr. of the Nacionalista Party ran for a third term.

Haresco was defeated by former Aklan governor Florencio Miraflores of the Nationalist People's Coalition. Jun Tanumtanum (Independent) also ran for representative.

Candidate	Party	Votes	%
Florencio Miraflores	Nationalist People's Coalition	88,795	50.82
Teodorico Haresco Jr. (incumbent)	Nacionalista Party	85,253	48.79
Jun Tanumtanum	Independent	685	0.39
Total		174,733	100.00
Valid votes		174,733	96.12
Invalid/blank votes		7,049	3.88
Total votes		181,782	100.00
Registered voters/turnout		205,358	88.52
NPC gain from Nacionalista			
Source: Commission on Elections

== Antique ==
Incumbent Antonio Legarda Jr. of the Nationalist People's Coalition ran for a second term.

Legarda won re-election against outgoing Antique governor Rhodora Cadiao (National Unity Party) and two other candidates.

Candidate	Party	Votes	%
Antonio Legarda Jr. (incumbent)	Nationalist People's Coalition	210,491	63.33
Rhodora Cadiao	National Unity Party	120,203	36.16
Toto Abiog	Partido para sa Demokratikong Reporma	1,002	0.30
Mayong Petinglay	Independent	690	0.21
Total		332,386	100.00
Valid votes		332,386	94.84
Invalid/blank votes		18,076	5.16
Total votes		350,462	100.00
Registered voters/turnout		399,553	87.71
NPC hold			
Source: Commission on Elections

== Capiz ==
=== 1st district ===
Incumbent Tawi Billones of the Liberal Party was term-limited.

Billones endorsed Paolo Roxas of One Capiz, son of former Secretary of the Interior and Local Government Mar Roxas, who was defeated by Pinuno party-list representative Howard Guinto, who ran as an independent.

Candidate	Party	Votes	%
Howard Guintu	Independent	131,545	54.63
Paolo Roxas	One Capiz	109,249	45.37
Total		240,794	100.00
Valid votes		240,794	96.44
Invalid/blank votes		8,894	3.56
Total votes		249,688	100.00
Registered voters/turnout		286,934	87.02
Independent gain from One Capiz			
Source: Commission on Elections

=== 2nd district ===
Incumbent Jane Castro of Lakas–CMD won re-election for a second term unopposed.

Candidate	Party	Votes	%
Jane Castro (incumbent)	Lakas–CMD	157,199	100.00
Total		157,199	100.00
Valid votes		157,199	73.39
Invalid/blank votes		56,999	26.61
Total votes		214,198	100.00
Registered voters/turnout		252,525	84.82
Lakas hold			
Source: Commission on Elections

== Guimaras ==
Incumbent Lucille Nava of the National Unity Party (NUP) retired to run for governor of Guimaras. She was previously affiliated with PDP–Laban.

The NUP nominated Nava's husband, Guimaras governor JC Rahman Nava, who won the election against Vicente de Asis (Independent).

Candidate	Party	Votes	%
JC Rahman Nava	National Unity Party	91,194	89.85
Vicente de Asis	Independent	10,305	10.15
Total		101,499	100.00
Valid votes		101,499	92.99
Invalid/blank votes		7,649	7.01
Total votes		109,148	100.00
Registered voters/turnout		124,930	87.37
NUP hold			
Source: Commission on Elections

== Iloilo ==
=== 1st district ===
Incumbent Janette Garin of Lakas–CMD ran for a third term. She was previously affiliated with the National Unity Party.

Garin won re-election against former Tubungan mayor Victor Tabaquirao (PDP–Laban) and Rosendo Langusta (Independent).

Candidate	Party	Votes	%
Janette Garin (incumbent)	Lakas–CMD	154,031	86.60
Victor Tabaquirao	PDP–Laban	19,929	11.20
Rosendo Langusta	Independent	3,900	2.19
Total		177,860	100.00
Valid votes		177,860	87.56
Invalid/blank votes		25,275	12.44
Total votes		203,135	100.00
Registered voters/turnout		234,519	86.62
Lakas hold			
Source: Commission on Elections

=== 2nd district ===
Incumbent Michael Gorriceta of the Nacionalista Party retired.

Gorriceta endorsed his wife, Kathryn Joyce Gorriceta (Lakas–CMD), who won the election unopposed.

Candidate	Party	Votes	%
Kathryn Joyce Gorriceta	Lakas–CMD	143,184	100.00
Total		143,184	100.00
Valid votes		143,184	74.12
Invalid/blank votes		50,003	25.88
Total votes		193,187	100.00
Registered voters/turnout		223,656	86.38
Lakas gain from Nacionalista			
Source: Commission on Elections

=== 3rd district ===
Incumbent Lorenz Defensor of the National Unity Party ran for a third term.

Defensor won re-election against Thelma Langusta (Independent).

Candidate	Party	Votes	%
Lorenz Defensor (incumbent)	National Unity Party	194,791	98.64
Thelma Langusta	Independent	2,679	1.36
Total		197,470	100.00
Valid votes		197,470	85.51
Invalid/blank votes		33,472	14.49
Total votes		230,942	100.00
Registered voters/turnout		275,733	83.76
NUP hold			
Source: Commission on Elections

=== 4th district ===
Incumbent Ferjenel Biron of the Nacionalista Party ran for a second term.

Biron won re-election against Charlie Sustento Jr. (Reform PH Party).

Candidate	Party	Votes	%
Ferjenel Biron (incumbent)	Nacionalista Party	139,202	63.73
Charlie Sustento Jr.	Reform PH Party	79,236	36.27
Total		218,438	100.00
Valid votes		218,438	93.58
Invalid/blank votes		14,981	6.42
Total votes		233,419	100.00
Registered voters/turnout		266,462	87.60
Nacionalista hold			
Source: Commission on Elections

=== 5th district ===
Term-limited incumbent Raul Tupas of Lakas–CMD ran for vice governor of Iloilo.

Lakas–CMD nominated Tupas' wife, provincial board member Binky Tupas, who won the election against former representative Niel Tupas Jr. (Nationalist People's Coalition).

Candidate	Party	Votes	%
Binky Tupas	Lakas–CMD	145,283	56.18
Niel Tupas Jr.	Nationalist People's Coalition	113,313	43.82
Total		258,596	100.00
Valid votes		258,596	94.03
Invalid/blank votes		16,430	5.97
Total votes		275,026	100.00
Registered voters/turnout		318,739	86.29
Lakas hold			
Source: Commission on Elections

== Iloilo City ==
Incumbent Julienne Baronda of Lakas–CMD ran for a third term. She was previously affiliated with the National Unity Party.

Baronda ran against perennial candidate Camelo Carreon (Independent) and Danilo Purzuelo (Independent).

Candidate	Party	Votes	%
Julienne Baronda (incumbent)	Lakas–CMD	178,056	78.13
Carmelo Carreon	Independent	44,913	19.71
Danilo Purzuelo	Independent	4,940	2.17
Total		227,909	100.00
Valid votes		227,909	85.73
Invalid/blank votes		37,939	14.27
Total votes		265,848	100.00
Registered voters/turnout		330,621	80.41
Lakas hold			
Source: Commission on Elections
