= Howard Guintu =

Filipino politician and businessman

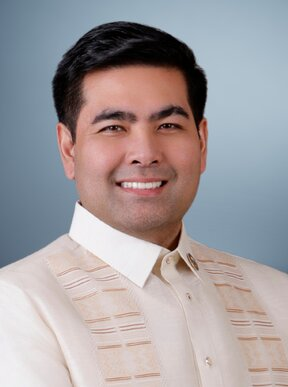
- Official portrait, 2025

Member of the Philippine House of Representatives from Capiz's 1st congressional district
- Incumbent
- Assumed office June 30, 2025
- Preceded by: Tawi Billones

Member of the Philippine House of Representatives for Pinuno Partylist
- In office June 30, 2022 – June 30, 2025

Personal details
- Born: Ivan Howard Abendaño Guintu; April 27, 1988 (age 38) Angeles City, Philippines
- Party: Independent (2024–present)
- Other political affiliations: Pinuno Partylist (2022–2025)
- Education: University of San Francisco (BA)
- Occupation: Politician, businessman

Ivan Howard Abendaño Guintu (born April 27, 1988), commonly known as Howard Guintu, is a Filipino politician and businessman currently serving as the Representative of Capiz’s 1st congressional district since 2025. He served as party-list representative for Pinuno Partylist from 2022 to 2025, he was elected as district congressman in May 2025, defeating Paolo Roxas.

== Early life and business career ==
Guintu was born on April 27, 1988 in Angeles City. He is the son of Ida Andrada Abendaño of Roxas City and Engr. Homer Sonza Guintu of Masantol. He is a nephew of Masantol Mayor Danilo Sonza Guintu. He is also a nephew of former Roxas City Mayor and Capiz Governor Antonio Andrada Del Rosario and Panay Mayor Sonny B. Besa. He is a cousin of Capiz 1st District Board Member Jose Fulgencio A. del Rosario. Guintu earned a Bachelor of Arts in Entrepreneurship and Administration from the University of San Francisco. He then held executive roles—including CEO, COO, and President—in the housing and real estate industry, working notably for Golden Home Realty Development Inc.. He was recognized as a Top 10 PAG-IBIG Developer in NCR in 2017 and Top 7 in 2018.

== Political career ==
=== PINUNO Party-list (2022–2025) ===
In 2022, Guintu was elected to the House of Representatives as the sole representative of the Pinuno Partylist, serving in the 19th Congress.

=== Congressional campaign and win in Capiz ===
In the 2025 elections, Guintu ran for Capiz’s 1st congressional district as an independent candidate, challenging Paolo Roxas, the son of former Secretary of the Interior and Local Government Mar Roxas. He won by a margin of over 22,000 votes—130,545 for Guintu versus 108,249 for Roxas—dominating several municipalities including Pontevedra, Pilar, Panay, Maayon, and President Roxas. He officially took his oath of office on June 30, 2025.

=== District representation (2025–present) ===
With his election, Guintu succeeded Tawi Billones, ending a long-standing Liberal Party hold on the district.

== Legislative priorities ==
Guintu’s 2025 campaign emphasized infrastructure development, economic revitalization and community-focused programs. He supported upgrading the Roxas City port and modernizing Roxas Airport, and pledged more efficient public service and projects in Capiz’s 1st District.

== Electoral history ==
Electoral history of Howard Guintu
Year	Office	Party	Votes received				Result
Year	Office	Party	Total	%	P.	Swing	Result
2022	Representative (Party-list)	Pinuno	299,990	0.82%	39th	—N/a	Won
2025	Representative (Capiz–1st)	Independent	131,545	54.63%	1st	—N/a	Won
