= List of vice presidents of the Philippines by other offices held =

This is a list of vice presidents of the Philippines by offices held before their vice presidency (either elected or appointed).

== Executive branch ==
=== Cabinet secretaries (as full-time) ===
The following list includes only cabinet secretaries who served full-time. Vice presidents who served concurrently as cabinet secretaries and their post-vice presidency positions are not included. For the list of concurrent appointments, see Vice President of the Philippines § Cabinet member.

Secretary	Office	President served under	Year(s) served
Elpidio Quirino	Secretary of Finance	Manuel Quezon	1934–1936
Elpidio Quirino	Secretary of Interior	Manuel Quezon	1935–1938
Teofisto Guingona Jr.	Secretary of Justice	Fidel V. Ramos	1995–1998

=== Other positions (full-time) ===
Name	Office	President served under	Year(s) served
Teofisto Guingona	Chairman of the Commission on Audit	Corazon Aquino	1986–1987
Teofisto Guingona	Executive Secretary of the Philippines	Fidel V. Ramos	1993–1995
Gloria Macapagal Arroyo	Undersecretary of the Department of Trade and Industry	Corazon Aquino	1987–1992
Jejomar Binay	Chairman of the Metropolitan Manila Development Authority	Corazon Aquino	1990–1991
Jejomar Binay	Chairman of the Metropolitan Manila Development Authority	Joseph Estrada	1999–2001

== Legislative ==
=== Senators ===
Senator	District	Year(s) served	Notes
Sergio Osmeña	10th	1922–1935	First vice president to have served as president pro tempore (1922–1934)
Elpidio Quirino	1st	1925–1935; 1945–1946	Second vice president to have served as president pro tempore (1945–1946)
Elpidio Quirino	At-large	1925–1935; 1945–1946	Second vice president to have served as president pro tempore (1945–1946)
Fernando Lopez	At-large	1947–1949	As a Liberal
Fernando Lopez	At-large	1953–1965	As a Democrat and Nacionalista; third vice president to have served as president pro tempore (1958–1965); only former vice president to be elected again in the same position
Carlos P. Garcia	At-large	1945–1953	First vice president to have served as the minority floor leader (1946–1953)
Emmanuel Pelaez	At-large	1953–1959; 1967–1972	Only former vice president elected in the Senate
Salvador Laurel	At-large	1967–1972	Did not finish term due to the declaration of martial law
Joseph Estrada	At-large	1987–1992	
Gloria Macapagal Arroyo	At-large	1992–1998	First term lasted for only three years; did not finish second term, won vice presidency
Teofisto Guingona Jr.	At-large	1987–1993	Second vice president to have served as president pro tempore (1987–1990); Only vice president to have served as the majority floor leader (1990–1991); did not finish second term after being appointed as the executive secretary
Teofisto Guingona Jr.	At-large	1998–2001	Second and last vice president to be the minority floor leader, 1998–2001; Did not finish term, appointed to the vice presidency
Noli De Castro	At-large	2001–2004	Did not finish term, won vice presidency

=== Members of a lower (or sole) legislative house ===
Legislator	Constituency	Name of lower house	Year(s) served	Notes
Sergio Osmeña	Cebu–2nd	Philippine Assembly	1907–1916	First vice president to have served as speaker (1907–1916)
Sergio Osmeña	Cebu–2nd	House of Representatives	1916–1922	First vice president to have served as speaker (1907–1916)
Elpidio Quirino	Ilocos Sur–1st	House of Representatives	1919–1925	
Carlos P. Garcia	Bohol–3rd	House of Representatives	1925–1931	
Diosdado Macapagal	Pampanga–1st	House of Representatives	1949–1957	
Salvador Laurel	Region IV-A	Interim Batasang Pambansa	1978–1983	Resigned in 1983
Leni Robredo	Camarines Sur–3rd	House of Representatives	2013– 2016	Only one-term representative to win the vice presidency

== Local government ==
=== Governors ===
Governor	Province	Year(s) served	Notes
Sergio Osmeña	Cebu	1904–1907	
Carlos P. Garcia	Bohol	1933–1941	
Jejomar Binay	Metro Manila	1987–1988	Acting/interim basis

=== Mayors ===
Mayor	City/municipality	Year(s) served	Notes
Fernando Lopez	Iloilo	1945–1947	Appointed
Joseph Estrada	San Juan	1969–1986	Only former vice president to previously serve as mayor and only former vice president to serve as mayor in another city after his term (Manila, 2013–2019)
Jejomar Binay	Makati	1986–1987	As officer-in-charge
Jejomar Binay	Makati	1988–1998	Elected; first vice president without congressional experience
Jejomar Binay	Makati	2001–2010	Elected; first vice president without congressional experience
Sara Duterte	Davao City	2010–2013; 2016–2022	Only vice president to have served as vice mayor (2007–2010); Second vice president without congressional experience

== See also ==
- List of presidents of the Philippines by other offices held
