= Trinidad V. Canja - Sta. Teresa National High School =

Public high school in Guimaras, Philippines

Location
- Barangay Sta. Teresa; Jordan, Guimaras; Philippines
- Coordinates: 10°35′33″N 122°33′39″E

Information
- Type: Public High School
- Established: 1966
- School district: Jordan II

Trinidad V. Canja - Sta. Teresa National High School (abbreviated as TVC - STNHS or Trinidad V. Canja - Sta. Teresa Nat'l High School) is a public high school located in Jordan, Guimaras.

== History ==
Sta. Teresa Barrio High School was opened in June, 1966 on the old site of Sta. Teresa Elementary School. The Canja family donated a lot of 2 hectares (4.9 acres) for the school.

The high school's first principal was Pedro Alamigo. Faculty and staff included Dominador Gange, N. Hechanova, Clarita Gabasa, E. Gonzales and Elsie Ganancial. Initially, six teachers taught thirty-nine students, with one section for each level.

It was first named Sta. Teresa Barrio High School, then Sta. Teresa Barangay High School, for it accepted only enrollees from this barangay. The school became a Nationalized High School in 1989. It was later named Trinidad V. Canja – Sta. Teresa National High School.

== Development ==
At present, thousands of students study there from various barangays – San Miguel, Lawi, Buluangan, Sinapsapan, Espinosa, Ravina. Past graduates include teachers, seamen, nurses, doctors, engineers and lawyers.
