= List of presidents of the Philippines by other offices held =

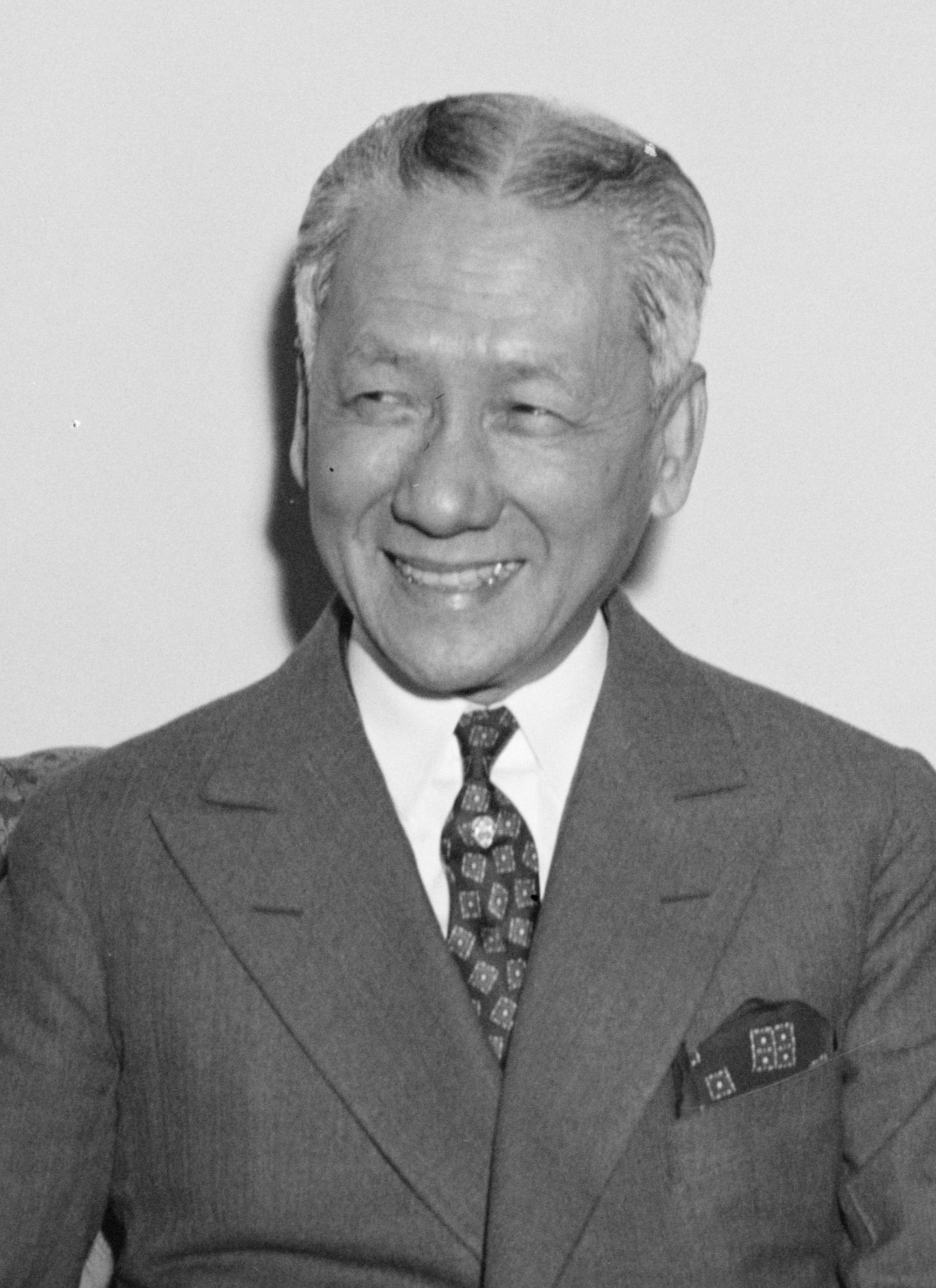
Sergio Osmeña was the first vice president of the Philippines to serve as president.

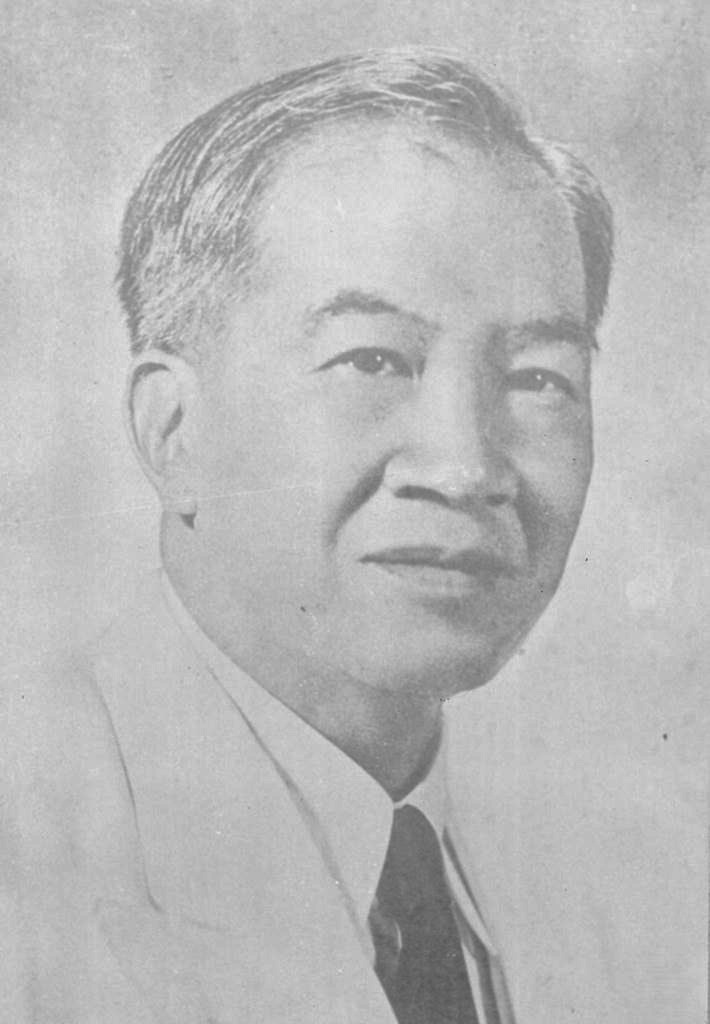
Jose P. Laurel was the only president to have served in both the legislative and judicial branches of government prior to his presidency.

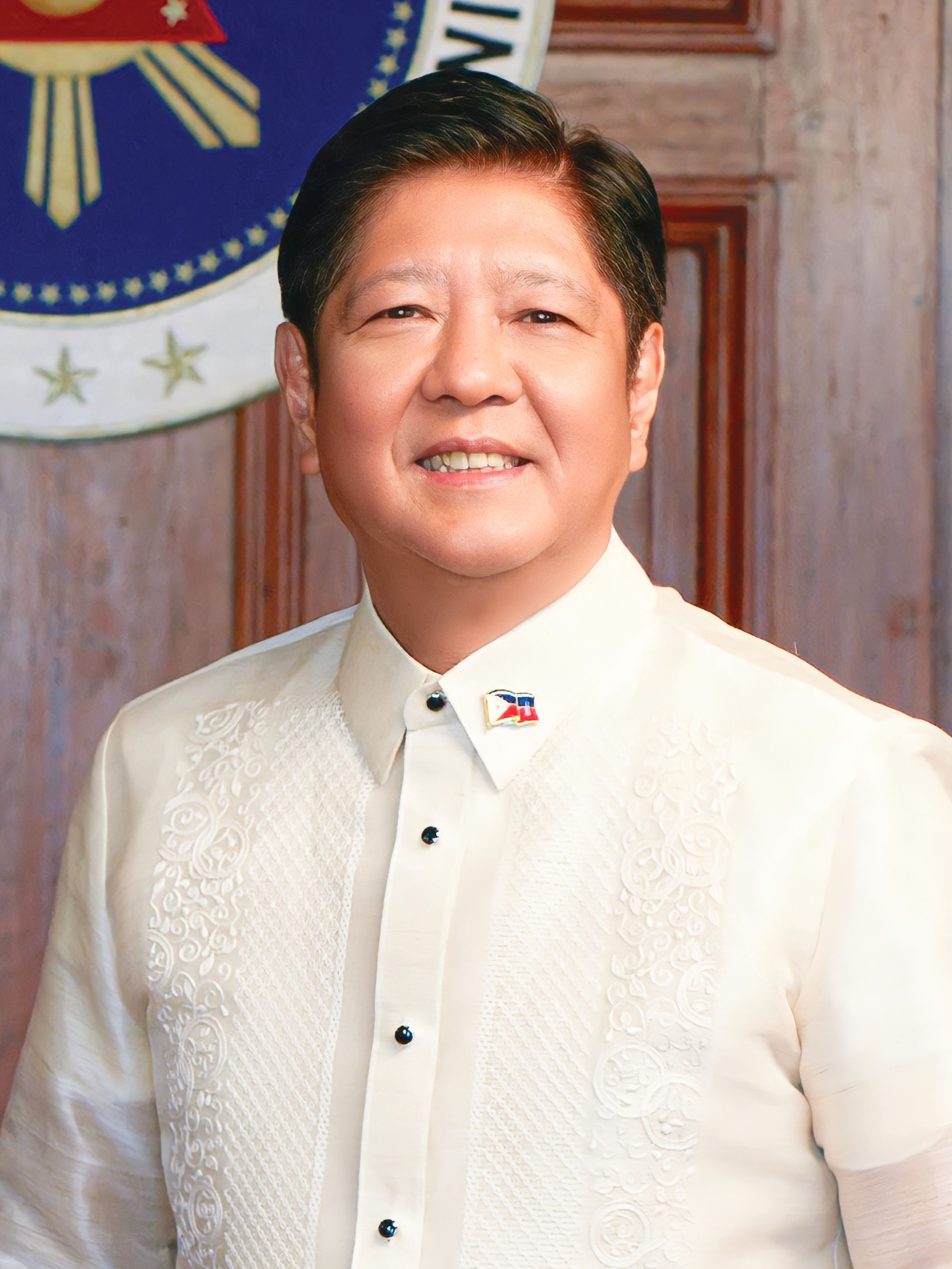
Bongbong Marcos is the most recent president to have served in both houses of Congress.

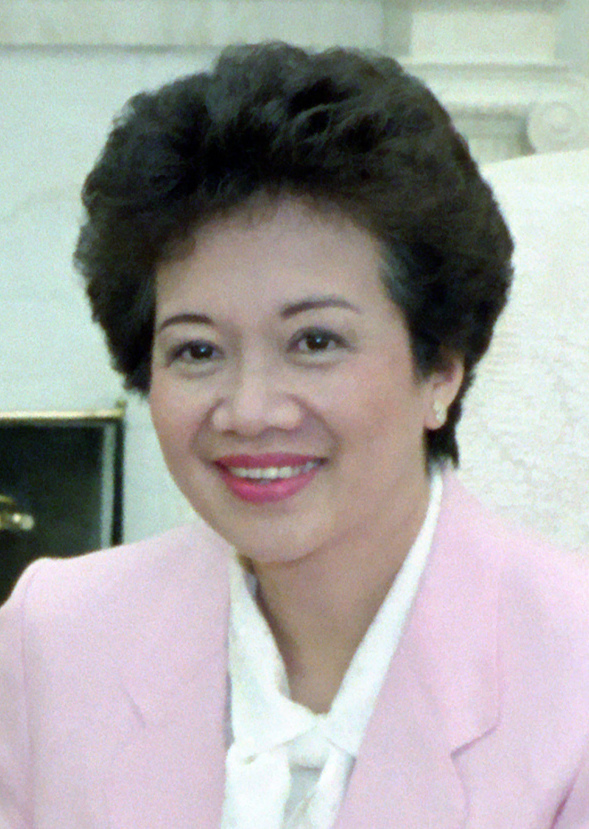
Corazon Aquino is the only president without prior government or military experience before assuming the presidency.

This is a list of presidents of the Philippines by offices held before their presidency (either elected or appointed).

Every president except Corazon Aquino has served as at least one of the following:

- a vice president of the Philippines
- a member of the presidential cabinet
- a member of Congress (either a Philippine senator or representative)
- a provincial governor
- a military general

== Executive branch ==
=== Presidents ===
This list only counts unrecognized governments prior to the establishment of the First Philippine Republic.

President	Government	Year(s) served	Notes
Emilio Aguinaldo	Tejeros Revolutionary Government	1897	
Emilio Aguinaldo	Biak-na-Bato Republic	1897	
Emilio Aguinaldo	Dictatorial Government	1898	
Emilio Aguinaldo	Revolutionary Government	1898–1899	

=== Vice presidents ===
Vice President	President served under	Year(s) served	Notes
Sergio Osmeña	Manuel L. Quezon	1935–1944	Osmeña succeeded Quezon, after the latter's death
Elpidio Quirino	Manuel Roxas	1946–1948	Quirino succeeded Roxas, after the latter's death; ran and won a full term in 1949
Carlos P. Garcia	Ramon Magsaysay	1953–1957	Garcia succeeded Magsaysay, after the latter's death; ran and won a full term in 1957
Diosdado Macapagal	Carlos P. Garcia	1957–1961	Macapagal defeated Garcia in 1961
Joseph Estrada	Fidel V. Ramos	1992–1998	Estrada ran for a full term in 1998
Gloria Macapagal Arroyo	Joseph Estrada	1998–2001	Arroyo succeeded Estrada, after the latter's resignation; ran and won a full term in 2004

3 other former vice presidents (Salvador Laurel, Jejomar Binay, and Leni Robredo) all made unsuccessful runs for the presidency.

=== Cabinet secretaries ===
The following list includes only cabinet secretaries who served full-time. Vice presidents who served concurrently as cabinet secretaries are not included. For the list of concurrent appointments, see Vice President of the Philippines § Cabinet member.

Secretary	Office	President served under	Year(s) served
Elpidio Quirino	Secretary of Finance	Manuel Quezon	1934– 1936
Elpidio Quirino	Secretary of Interior	Manuel Quezon	1935–1938
Manuel Roxas	Secretary of Interior	Manuel Quezon	1941
Ramon Magsaysay	Secretary of National Defense	Elpidio Quirino	1935–1944
Fidel V. Ramos	Secretary of National Defense	Corazon Aquino	1988–1991

=== Other positions ===
Name	Office	President served under	Year(s) served
Gloria Macapagal Arroyo	Undersecretary of the Department of Trade and Industry	Corazon Aquino	1987–1992

== Legislative ==
=== Senators ===
Senator	District	Year(s) served	Notes
Manuel L. Quezon	5th	1916–1935	First president to have served as Senate president (1916–1935)
Jose P. Laurel	5th	1925–1931	Only former president to have served as senator (1951–1957); Only senator to have served as majority floor leader (1925–1931)
Sergio Osmeña	10th	1922–1935	First president to have served as president pro tempore (1922–1934)
Manuel Roxas	At-large	1945–1946	Second president to have served as Senate president (1916–1935)
Elpidio Quirino	1st	1925–1935	Second and last president to have served as president pro tempore (1945–1946)
Elpidio Quirino	At-large	1945–1946	Second and last president to have served as president pro tempore (1945–1946)
Carlos P. Garcia	At-large	1945–1953	First president to have served as minority floor leader (1946–1953)
Ferdinand E. Marcos	At-large	1959–1965	Second and last president to have served as minority floor leader (1960–1962); Third and last president to have served as Senate president (1963–1965)
Joseph Estrada	At-large	1987–1992	
Gloria Macapagal Arroyo	At-large	1992–1998	
Benigno Aquino III	At-large	2007–2010	Did not finish term due to winning the presidency
Bongbong Marcos	At-large	2010–2016	

=== Members of a lower (or sole) legislative house ===
Legislator	District	Name of lower (or sole) house	Year(s) served	Notes
Manuel L. Quezon	Tayabas–1st	Philippine Assembly	1907–1909	First president to have served as majority floor leader (1907–1909)
Sergio Osmeña	Cebu–2nd	Philippine Assembly	1907–1916	First president to have served as speaker (1907–1916)
Sergio Osmeña	Cebu–2nd	House of Representatives	1916–1922	First president to have served as speaker (1907–1916)
Manuel Roxas	Capiz–1st	House of Representatives	1922–1935	Second president to have served as majority floor leader Second president to have served as speaker (1922–1934)
Manuel Roxas	Capiz–1st	National Assembly	1935–1938	Second president to have served as majority floor leader Second president to have served as speaker (1922–1934)
Elpidio Quirino	Ilocos Sur–1st	House of Representatives	1919–1925	
Ramon Magsaysay	Zambales at-large	House of Representatives	1946–1950	
Carlos P. Garcia	Bohol–3rd	House of Representatives	1925–1931	
Diosdado Macapagal	Pampanga–1st	House of Representatives	1949–1957	
Ferdinand E. Marcos	Ilocos Norte–2nd	House of Representatives	1949–1959	
Benigno Aquino III	Tarlac–2nd	House of Representatives	1998–2007	Only president to have served as deputy speaker (2004–2006)
Rodrigo Duterte	Davao City–1st	House of Representatives	1998–2001	
Bongbong Marcos	Ilocos Norte–2nd	House of Representatives	1992–1995; 2007– 2010	

== Local government ==
=== Governors ===
Governor	Province	Year(s) served	Notes
Manuel Quezon	Tayabas	1906–1907	
Sergio Osmeña	Cebu	1904–1907	
Manuel Roxas	Capiz	1919–1922	
Carlos P. Garcia	Bohol	1933–1941	
Ramon Magsaysay	Zambales	1945	As military governor
Bongbong Marcos	Ilocos Norte	1983–1986; 1998–2007	Only president to have served as vice governor (1980–1983)

=== Mayors ===
Mayor	City/municipality	Year(s) served	Notes
Joseph Estrada	San Juan	1969–1986	First former president to serve as mayor (2013–2019)
Rodrigo Duterte	Davao City	1988–1998; 2001–2010; 2013–2016	Only president to have served as vice mayor (1986–1987; 2010–2013); Second former president elected as mayor (2025)

=== Municipal/city councilors ===
Name	City/municipality	Province	Year(s) served
Manuel Quezon	Lucena	Tayabas	1906
Manuel Roxas	Capiz	Capiz	1917–1919

== Judiciary ==
Name	Position	Year(s) served	President	Notes
Jose P. Laurel	Associate Justice of the Supreme Court	1936–1942	Manuel Quezon	Only president to have served on the Supreme Court

== International affairs-related ==
Name	Office	President served under	Year(s) served
Manuel Quezon	Resident Commissioner of the Philippines	None (Under American rule)	1909–1916

== Presidents who had not previously held elective office ==
=== Without previous experience in government, but served in the military ===
Name	Year(s) served
Emilio Aguinaldo	1899–1901

=== Without previous experience in government or in the military ===
Name	Year(s) served
Corazon Aquino	1986–1992

== See also ==
- List of former presidents of the Philippines who pursued public office
