= Guimaras Provincial Board =

Legislative body of the province of Guimaras, Philippines

Guimaras Provincial Board Sangguniang Panlalawigan ng Guimaras

Type
- Type: Unicameral
- Term limits: 3 terms (9 years)

Leadership
- Presiding Officer: Cecile C. Gamarin, NUP since June 30, 2025

Structure
- Seats: 13 board members 1 ex officio presiding officer
- Political groups: NUP (7) PFP (2) Independent (1) TBD (1) Nonpartisan (2)
- Length of term: 3 years
- Authority: Local Government Code of the Philippines

Elections
- Voting system: Multiple non-transferable vote (regular members); Indirect election (ex officio members)
- Last election: May 12, 2025
- Next election: May 15, 2028

Meeting place
- Guimaras Provincial Capitol, Jordan

The Guimaras Provincial Board is the Sangguniang Panlalawigan (provincial legislature) of the Philippine province of Guimaras.

The members are elected via plurality-at-large voting: the province is divided into two districts, each having four seats. A voter votes up to four names, with the top four candidates per district being elected. The vice governor is the ex officio presiding officer, and only votes to break ties. The vice governor is elected via the plurality voting system province-wide.

The districts used in appropriation of members is not coextensive with the legislative district of Guimaras; unlike congressional representation which is at-large, Guimaras is divided into two districts for representation in the Sangguniang Panlalawigan.

Aside from the regular members, the board also includes the provincial federation presidents of the Liga ng mga Barangay (ABC, from its old name "Association of Barangay Captains"), the Sangguniang Kabataan (SK, youth councils) and the Philippine Councilors League (PCL).

== Apportionment ==
Elections	Seats per district		Ex officio seats	Total seats
Elections	1st	2nd	Ex officio seats	Total seats
2010–2025	4	4	3	11
2025–present	4	6	3	13

== List of members ==
=== Current members ===
These are the members after the 2025 local elections and 2023 barangay and SK elections:

- Vice Governor: Cecile C. Gamarin (NUP)

Seat	Board member	Party	Start of term	End of term
1st district	Ariel C. Zambarrano	NUP	June 30, 2025	June 30, 2028
1st district	Rommel John G. Edang	Independent	June 30, 2025	June 30, 2028
1st district	Arthur A. Cartel Jr.	NUP	June 30, 2025	June 30, 2028
1st district	Raymond H. Gavileño	NUP	June 30, 2019	June 30, 2028
2nd district	Felipe Hilan A. Nava	NUP	June 30, 2022	June 30, 2028
2nd district	Alejandro D. Araneta	NUP	June 30, 2022	June 30, 2028
2nd district	Paul Vincent G. De la Cruz	NUP	June 30, 2025	June 30, 2028
2nd district	Marilyn G. Edang	NUP	June 30, 2022	June 30, 2028
2nd district	Eros E. Elevencione	PFP	June 30, 2025	June 30, 2028
2nd district	Joel G. Tanaleon	PFP	June 30, 2025	June 30, 2028
ABC	Marilou Delumpa	Nonpartisan	July 30, 2018	January 1, 2023
PCL	TBD			June 30, 2028
SK	Karren Gadnanan	Nonpartisan	June 8, 2018	January 1, 2023

=== Vice Governor ===
Election year	Name	Party	Ref.
2016	John Edward G. Gando	Liberal	
2019	John Edward G. Gando	PDP–Laban	
2022	John Edward G. Gando	PDP–Laban	
2025	Cecile C. Gamarin	NUP	

=== 1st District ===
- Population (2024):

Election year	Member (party)	Member (party)	Member (party)	Member (party)	Ref.
2016	Cyril C. Beltran (Liberal)	Rex G. Fernandez (Liberal)	Dan Elby C. Habaña (Liberal)	Aurelio G. Tionado (Independent)	
2019	Cyril C. Beltran (PDP–Laban)	Rex G. Fernandez (PDP–Laban)	Raymond H. Gavileño (PDP–Laban)	Aurelio G. Tionado (PDP–Laban)	
2022	Cecile C. Gumarin (PDP–Laban)	Perfecto G. Habaña (PDP–Laban)	Raymond H. Gavileño (PDP–Laban)	Aurelio G. Tionado (PDP–Laban)	
2025	Ariel C. Zambarrano (NUP)	Arthur A. Cartel, Jr. (NUP)	Raymond H. Gavileño (NUP)	Rommel John G. Edang (Independent)	

=== 2nd District ===
- Population (2024):

Election year	Member (party)	Member (party)	Member (party)	Ref.
2016	David G. Gano (Liberal)	Crisente P. Chavez, Jr. (Liberal)	—	
2016	Diosdado G. Gonzaga (Liberal)	Josefina G. dela Cruz (Liberal)	—	
2019	David G. Gano (PDP–Laban)	Luben G. Vilches (PDP–Laban)	—	
2019	Diosdado G. Gonzaga (PDP–Laban)	Josefina G. dela Cruz (PDP–Laban)	—	
2022	Felipe Hilan A. Nava (NUP)	Luben G. Vilches (PDP–Laban)	—	
2022	Alejandro D. Araneta (NUP)	Marilyn G. Edang (NUP)	—	
2025	Felipe Hilan A. Nava (NUP)	Paul Vincent G. De la Cruz (NUP)	Eros E. Elevencione (PFP)	
2025	Alejandro D. Araneta (NUP)	Marilyn G. Edang (NUP)	Joel G. Tanaleon (PFP)	
