= Legislative districts of Guimaras =

Districts of Philippine province

The legislative districts of Guimaras are the representations of the province of Guimaras in the various national legislatures of the Philippines. The province is currently represented in the lower house of the Congress of the Philippines through its lone congressional district.

== History ==
Prior to gaining its separate representation, Guimaras was a sub-province of Iloilo and was last represented as part of Iloilo's 2nd district in the House of Representatives from 1987 to 1995 and in earlier national legislatures from 1907 to 1972. It was also formerly included in the multi-member Iloilo's at-large district for the Malolos Congress from 1898 to 1899 and for the Regular Batasang Pambansa from 1984 to 1986 and the multi-member Region VI's at-large district for the Interim Batasang Pambansa from 1978 to 1984.

Guimaras was given its own representation ahead of the 1995 Philippine House of Representatives elections following its conversion into a regular province under the 1991 Local Government Code (Republic Act No. 7160) which was ratified in a 1992 plebiscite concurrent with that year's general election.

== Current districts ==
Legislative Districts and Congressional Representatives of Guimaras
District	Current Representative	Party	Population (2020)	Area
Lone	Joaquin Carlos Rahman A. Nava (since 2025); Jordan	NUP	187,842	604.57 km^{2}

== See also ==
- Legislative districts of Iloilo
