= Tawi Billones =

Filipino politician

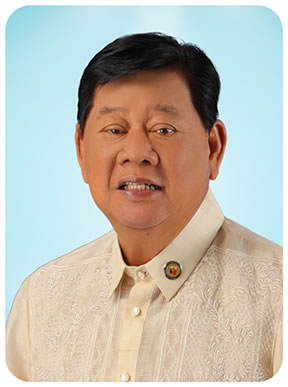
- Official portrait, 2022

Member of the Philippine House of Representatives from the 1st district of Capiz
- In office June 30, 2016 – June 30, 2025
- Preceded by: Antonio del Rosario
- Succeeded by: Howard Guintu

Personal details
- Born: Emmanuel Acuña Billones; April 11, 1946 (age 80)
- Party: Liberal (2015–present); One Capiz (local party; 2024–present)
- Profession: Politician

Emmanuel "Tawi" Acuña Billones (born April 14, 1946) is a Filipino politician. A member of the Liberal Party, he served as a member of the Philippine House of Representatives representing the 1st District of Capiz from 2016 to 2025.

== Political career ==
In 2016, Billones was elected member of the Philippine House of Representatives representing the 1st District of Capiz. He was re-elected in 2019 and in 2022.

=== Congressional career ===
During the 17th Congress, Billones along with other congressional Liberals joined the minority bloc under the leadership of Rep. Miro Quimbo after the ouster of PDP-Laban House Speaker Pantaleon Alvarez. In February 2025, Billones was among the 240 members who voted to impeach vice president Sara Duterte.

House of Representatives of the Philippines
Preceded by Antonio del Rosario	Member of the House of Representatives from Capiz's 1st district 2016–2025	Succeeded by Howard Guintu
