= Fredenil Castro =

Filipino politician (born 1951)

Fredenil H. Castro
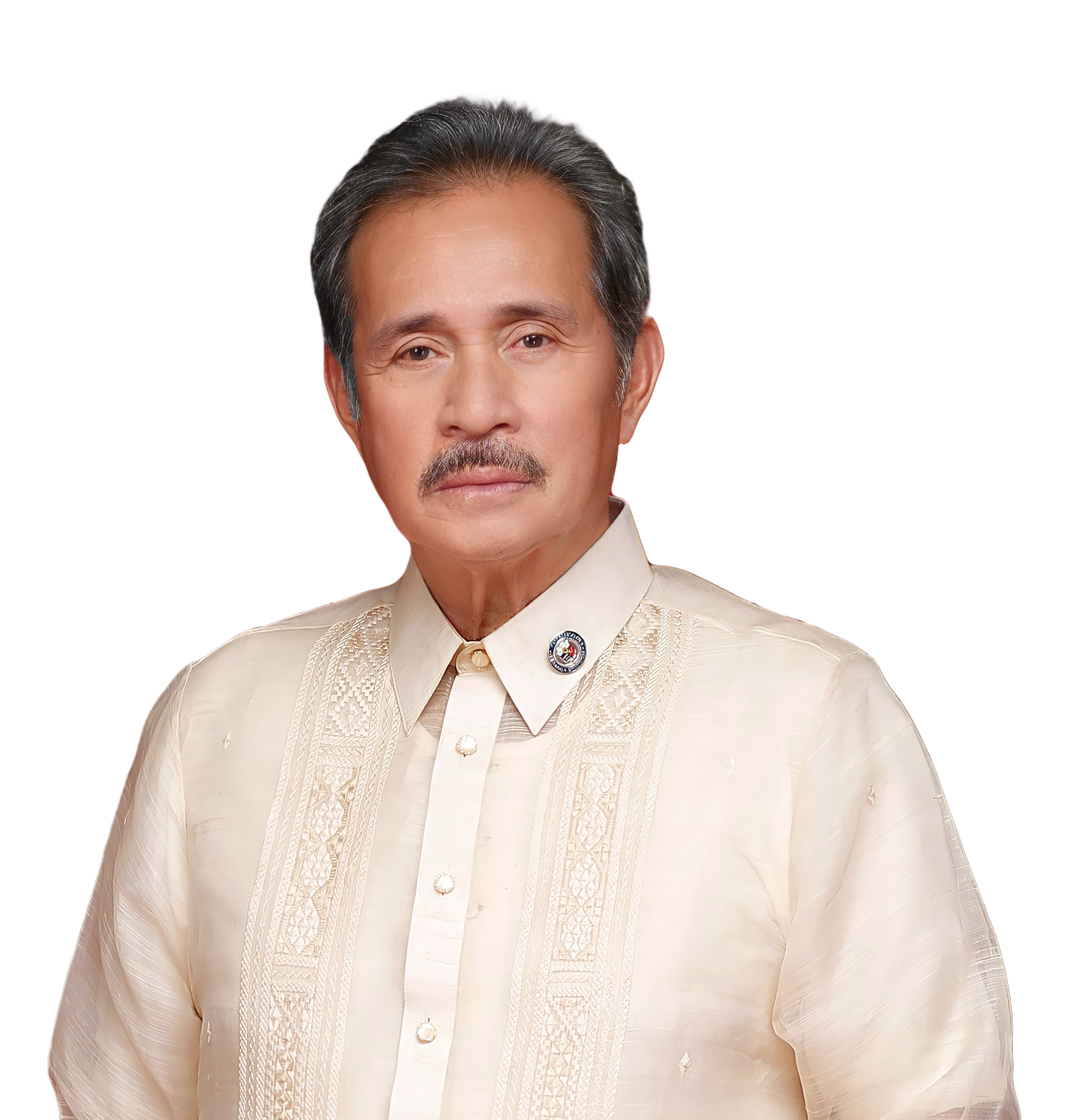
- Official portrait, 2024

24th Governor of Capiz
- Incumbent
- Assumed office June 30, 2022
- Vice Governor: Jaime Magbanua
- Preceded by: Esteban Evan Contreras II

Deputy Speaker of the House of Representatives
- In office October 2, 2020 – November 18, 2020 Serving with several others
- House Speaker: Alan Peter Cayetano; Lord Allan Velasco
- Preceded by: Mikee Romero
- Succeeded by: Rufus Rodriguez
- In office July 25, 2016 – January 21, 2019 Serving with several others
- House Speaker: Pantaleon Alvarez; Gloria Macapagal Arroyo
- Preceded by: Sergio Apostol

House Majority Leader
- In office January 21, 2019 – June 30, 2019
- Preceded by: Rolando Andaya Jr.
- Succeeded by: Martin Romualdez
- In office July 23, 2018 – July 30, 2018
- Preceded by: Rodolfo Fariñas
- Succeeded by: Rolando Andaya Jr.

Member of the Philippine House of Representatives from Capiz's 2nd congressional district
- In office June 30, 2013 – June 30, 2022
- Preceded by: Jane T. Castro
- Succeeded by: Jane T. Castro
- In office June 30, 2001 – June 30, 2010
- Preceded by: Vicente J. Andaya, Jr.
- Succeeded by: Jane T. Castro

Personal details
- Born: Fredenil Hernaez Castro; April 27, 1951 (age 75) Dumalag, Capiz, Philippines
- Party: Lakas (2007–2011, 2018–present); One Capiz (local party; 2024–present)
- Other political affiliations: Liberal (2001–2007); NUP (2011–2018)
- Spouse: Jane Tan
- Education: Colegio de la Purisima Concepcion (BA); San Beda College (LL.B)
- Profession: Lawyer, politician

Fredenil Hernaez Castro (born April 27, 1951), also known as Oto Castro, is a Filipino lawyer and politician serving as the Governor of Capiz since 2022. He was the Representative of Capiz's 2nd district from 2001 to 2010 and from 2013 to 2022. He had served as a House Deputy Speaker and as the House Majority Leader.

== Political career ==
Castro was first elected to the House of Representatives in 2001, representing the 2nd district of Capiz. He was re-elected in 2004 and 2007, thus reaching the limit of three consecutive terms in 2010. During his first two terms in the House, Castro was a member of the Liberal Party and an ally of fellow Capiznon Mar Roxas (who at that time was trade secretary and later a senator). In the 2007 elections, he ran under Lakas–CMD, the party supporting then-President Gloria Macapagal Arroyo. He also served as the chairman of the party's Capiz chapter.

In 2009, Castro also chaired the Capiz-based local party Ugyon Kita Capiz (UKC). With UKC, his wife Jane Tan-Castro was elected to the position he vacated. Jane served as the 2nd district's representative from 2010 to 2013. The Castros also allied themselves with former agriculture undersecretary Jocelyn Bolante, who was facing allegations of plunder. Bolante was UKC's vice-chairman who unsuccessfully ran for governor in 2010.

Castro successfully returned to the House in 2013. Running under the National Unity Party (NUP; formed by disgruntled Lakas members), he defeated Maria Andaya of the Liberal Party. He then became chair of the House Committee on Suffrage and Electoral Reforms in the 16th Congress.

In November 2013, Castro's committee unanimously approved House Bill 3587 or the Anti-Political Dynasty Act of 2013, which aims to prohibit relatives up to the second degree of consanguinity to hold or run for public offices in successive, simultaneous, or overlapping terms. It was the first time since 1988 that an anti-political dynasty bill passed the committee level. Castro then delivered the bill's sponsorship speech in May 2014, calling on his colleagues to "place the interest of the country ahead of personal interest".

Castro was unopposed in the 2016 elections. In the 17th Congress, he was elected by the House as one of the deputy speakers under Speaker Pantaleon Alvarez.

Before they were elected to their leadership posts, Castro and Alvarez co-authored House Bill No. 1 which aimed to restore capital punishment. The bill proposed lethal injection for crimes such as human trafficking, plunder, treason, parricide, infanticide, rape, piracy, bribery, kidnapping, illegal detention, robbery, car theft, destructive arson, terrorism, and drug-related cases.

Castro voted for the abolition of capital punishment back in 2006, but has changed his mind, explaining that he "could not accept the way crimes are being committed" in the country. The bill was approved by the House on its third and final reading on March 7, 2017. However, numerous amendments transformed it into House Bill No. 4727 with only drug-related crimes as capital offenses, in support of President Rodrigo Duterte's war on drugs.

Castro and Alvarez also co-authored House Bill No. 2 which aims to lower the age of criminal responsibility to 9 years old. Their joint statement reasoned that youth offenders "commit crimes knowing they can get away with it" and that adult criminals "knowingly and purposely make use of youth below 15 years old to commit crimes… aware that they cannot be held criminally liable." The bill was criticized by child rights advocates, the Commission on Human Rights (CHR), the Catholic Bishops' Conference of the Philippines (CBCP), and opposition legislators. On January 28, 2019 the House approved on the third and final reading House Bill No. 8858, which aimed to set the age of criminal responsibility at 12 years old instead. He also served as Majority Floor Leader of the House during the 17th Congress.

In 2022, Castro was elected Governor of Capiz. In September 2024, ahead of his 2025 reelection bid, Castro founded the One Capiz local party.

== Personal life ==
He took up a Bachelor of Arts at Colegio de la Purisima Concepcion, graduating in 1971, and he attained a Bachelor of Laws in San Beda College in 1975. He is a member of the Legal Management Council of the Philippines and the Association of Bank Lawyers of the Philippines.

He is married to Jane Tan. The couple reportedly became parents to twins through a Russian surrogate mother.

House of Representatives of the Philippines
Preceded by Vicente Andaya Jr.	Member of the House of Representatives from Capiz's 2nd district 2001–2010	Succeeded by Jane Tan Castro
Preceded by Jane Tan Castro	Member of the House of Representatives from Capiz's 2nd district 2013–2022	Succeeded by Jane Tan Castro
Preceded by Rolando Andaya Jr.	House Majority Leader; 2019	Succeeded by Martin Romualdez
Political offices
Preceded by Esteban Evan Contreras II	Governor of Capiz; 2022–present	Incumbent
Party political offices
New political party	Chairperson of One Capiz; 2024–present	Incumbent
