= Lucille Nava =

Filipino politician

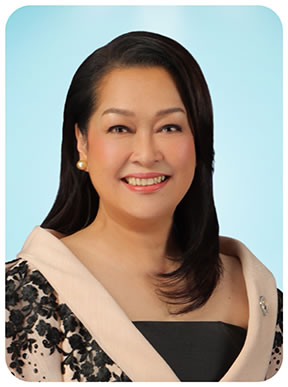
- Official portrait, 2022

6th Governor of Guimaras
- Incumbent
- Assumed office June 30, 2025
- Vice Governor: Cecile Gumarin
- Preceded by: JC Rahman Nava

Member of the House of Representatives of the Philippines
- In office June 30, 2016 – June 30, 2025
- Constituency: Guimaras's at-large congressional district

Personal details
- Born: September 21, 1966 (age 60) Saravia, Negros Occidental, Philippines
- Party: NUP (2022–present)
- Other political affiliations: PDP-Laban (2016–2022); Liberal (2015–2016)
- Spouse: JC Rahman Nava
- Education: University of the Philippines Visayas (BS)

Ma. Lucille Ledesma Nava (born September 21, 1966) is a Filipino politician who is currently serving as the governor of Guimaras since 2025. She previously served as a member of the House of Representatives from 2016 to 2025, representing Guimaras's at-large congressional district.

Nava is a physician by profession.

== Education ==
Nava earned a Bachelor of Science degree in biology from the University of the Philippines Visayas in 1988. She later obtained her medical degree from the Iloilo Doctors' College of Medicine and later completed a fellowship in infectious diseases at St. Luke's Medical Center.

== Political career ==
=== House of Representatives (2016–2025) ===
Nava was elected representative of Guimaras's lone district under the Liberal Party in the 2016 elections, defeating Henry Babiera; she succeeded her husband JC Rahman Nava, who ran for governor of Guimaras in 2016. Soon after her election, Nava left the Liberal Party to join PDP-Laban.

During the COVID-19 pandemic, Nava called for the rebuilding of Guimaras' health systems. In October 2020, Nava briefly held the position of chairperson of the House Committee on Health for a week during a speakership dispute between Lord Allan Velasco and Alan Peter Cayetano. Nava ultimately served three terms in Congress.

=== Governor of Guimaras ===
In 2025, Nava was elected governor of Guimaras under the National Unity Party (NUP), defeating independent candidate Maggie Cacho in a landslide. As governor, Nava worked alongside the Philippine Tuberculosis Society Inc. (PTSI) in initiating the Tuberculosis-Free Guimaras Island Initiative, a screening and treatment program in the province that aims to eradicate the disease from Guimaras within four to five years. American author and vlogger John Green visiting the province in October 2025 to assist in the program alongside Partners in Health after USAID, which had previously provided partial funding for the project, was largely dismantled.

== See also ==
- List of female members of the House of Representatives of the Philippines
- 17th Congress of the Philippines
- 18th Congress of the Philippines
- 19th Congress of the Philippines
