= Esteban Evan Contreras =

Filipino politician

The Honorable Esteban Evan Contreras
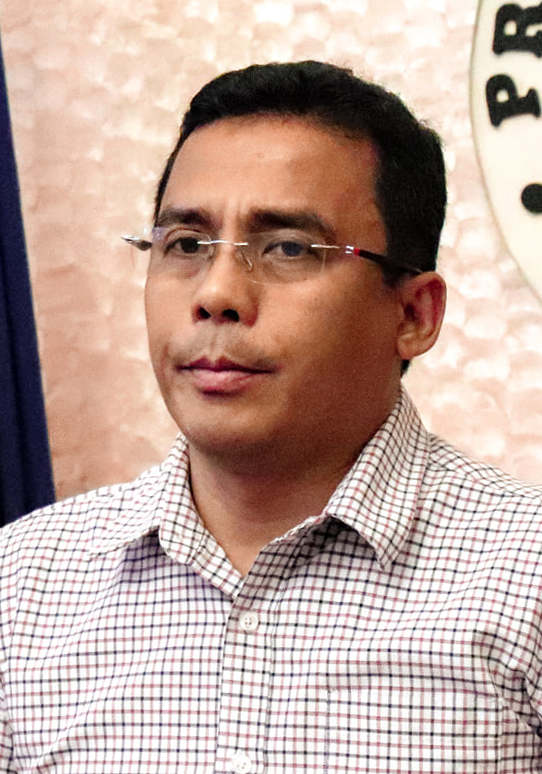
- Contreras in 2019

23rd Governor of Capiz
- In office June 30, 2019 – June 30, 2022
- Vice Governor: Jaime Magbanua
- Preceded by: Antonio del Rosario
- Succeeded by: Fredenil Castro

Vice Governor of Capiz
- In office June 30, 2010 – June 30, 2019
- Governor: Victor Tanco (until 2016); Antonio del Rosario (2016–2019)
- Preceded by: Felipe Barredo
- Succeeded by: Jaime Magbanua

Member of the Capiz Provincial Board from the 1st District
- In office June 30, 2004 – June 30, 2010

Personal details
- Born: Esteban Evan Bacero Contreras II; November 6, 1969 (age 56) Sampaloc, Manila, Philippines
- Party: Independent (2018–2021; 2024–present)
- Other political affiliations: PDP–Laban (2021–2024); Liberal (until 2018)
- Relations: Esteban Evan Espiñosa Contreras (father); Rosela Ingan Bacero (mother); Jose Contreras (brother)
- Education: University of San Agustin
- Occupation: Medical technologist, politician

Esteban Evan Bacero Contreras II (born November 6, 1969) is a Filipino politician from the province of Capiz in the Philippines. He served as Governor of Capiz from 2019 until his re-election loss in 2022. He was the Vice Governor of the province from 2010 to 2019 and he was first elected as Governor of the province in 2019. He is the son of Esteban Evan E. Contreras, who also served as the governor of Capiz from 1992 to 1998.

Political offices
Preceded by Antonio del Rosario	Governor of Capiz; 2019–2022	Succeeded by Fredenil Castro
Preceded by Felipe Barredo	Vice Governor of Capiz; 2010–2019	Succeeded by Jaime Magbanua
