= Pinuno Partylist =

Political party in the Philippines

Pinuno
- — Philippine partylist —
- Full name: Pinatatag na Ugnayan para sa mga Oportunidad sa Pabahay ng Masa
- Colors: Blue, Red
- Slogan: Pabahay para sa Masa (transl. Housing for the Masses)

Current representation (20th Congress)
- Seats in the House of Representatives: 0 / 3 (Out of 63 party-list seats)

Website
- pinunopartylist.com

The Pinatatag na Ugnayan para sa mga Oportunidad sa Pabahay ng Masa (lit. 'Strengthened Relations for Mass Housing Opportunities') more commonly known as the Pinuno Partylist (also stylized as PINUNO) is an organization with party-list representation in the House of Representatives of the Philippines.

== History ==
The Pinuno Partylist was established in 2019 as a civic, non-profit, and non-governmental organization which advocates for viable housing and livelihood programs. The abbreviation of the group is a reference to actor-politician Lito Lapid's moniker of pinuno or leader from his role in the television action drama series, Ang Probinsyano.

It sought party-list representation in the House of Representatives for the first time in the 2022 election. The launch for its first ever electoral bid was held in San Jose Del Monte, Bulacan.

Pinuno won a seat with Ivan Howard Guintu becoming the group's sole representative. Guintu was also the CEO of the real estate firm HG-III Construction and Development Corporation.

For the 2025 election, Guinto ran for Capiz's 1st district representative. Pinuno lost its representation after achieving 181,066 votes, or 0.43% of the vote, while Guinto, won as Capiz's 1st district representative.

== Electoral history ==
=== Electoral performance ===
Election	Votes	%	Party-list seats
2022	299,990	0.82%	1 / 63
2025	181,066	0.43%	0 / 63

== Representatives to Congress ==
Period	Representative
19th Congress; 2022–2025	Howard Guintu
Note: A party-list group, can win a maximum of three seats in the House of Representatives.
