= Guimaras's at-large congressional district =

House of Representatives of the Philippines legislative district

- Constituency for the House of Representatives of the Philippines
- Location of Guimaras within the Philippines
- Province: Guimaras
- Region: Western Visayas
- Population: 187,842 (2020)
- Electorate: 124,076 (2022)
- Area: 604.57 km^{2} (233.43 sq mi)

Current constituency
- Created: 1991
- Representative: JC Rahman Nava
- Political party: NUP
- Congressional bloc: Majority

Guimaras's at-large congressional district is the provincewide electoral district in Guimaras, Philippines. It was created ahead of the 1995 Philippine House of Representatives elections following its conversion into a regular province under the 1991 Local Government Code (Republic Act No. 7160) which was ratified in a 1992 plebiscite concurrent with that year's general election. Guimaras had been a sub-province of Iloilo since 1966 and was last represented as part of Iloilo's 2nd district in the House of Representatives from 1987 to 1995 and in earlier national legislatures from 1907 to 1972. It was also formerly included in the multi-member Region VI's at-large district for the Interim Batasang Pambansa from 1978 to 1984 and the multi-member Iloilo's at-large district for the Malolos Congress from 1898 to 1899 and for the Regular Batasang Pambansa from 1984 to 1986. The district is currently represented in the 20th Congress by JC Rahman Nava of the National Unity Party (NUP).

== Representation history ==
#	Image	Member	Term of office		Congress	Party	Electoral history
#	Image	Member	Start	End	Congress	Party	Electoral history
=== Guimaras's at-large district for the House of Representatives of the Philippines ===
District created October 10, 1991 from Iloilo's 2nd district.
1		Catalino G. Nava	June 30, 1995	December 3, 1995	10th	Lakas	Elected in 1995. Died in office.
—	vacant	December 3, 1995	June 30, 1998	–	10th	No special election held to fill vacancy.	
2		Emily R. Lopez	June 30, 1998	June 30, 2001	11th	LAMMP	Elected in 1998.
3		Edgar T. Espinosa	June 30, 2001	June 30, 2007	12th	Lakas	Elected in 2001.
3		Edgar T. Espinosa	June 30, 2001	June 30, 2007	13th	KAMPI	Re-elected in 2004.
4		JC Rahman Nava	June 30, 2007	June 30, 2016	14th	Lakas	Elected in 2007.
4		JC Rahman Nava	June 30, 2007	June 30, 2016	15th	Liberal	Re-elected in 2010.
4		JC Rahman Nava	June 30, 2007	June 30, 2016	16th	Liberal	Re-elected in 2013.
5		Lucille Nava	June 30, 2016	June 30, 2025	17th	PDP–Laban	Elected in 2016.
5		Lucille Nava	June 30, 2016	June 30, 2025	18th	PDP–Laban	Re-elected in 2019.
5		Lucille Nava	June 30, 2016	June 30, 2025	19th	NUP	Re-elected in 2022.
(4)		JC Rahman Nava	June 30, 2025	Incumbent	20th	NUP	Elected in 2025.

== Election results ==
=== 2022 ===
2022 Philippine House of Representatives elections
Party	Candidate	Votes	%
PDP–Laban	Lucille Marie Nava	93,994	97.22
KBL	Dado Veloso	2,684	2.78
Total votes		96,678	100.00
PDP–Laban hold			

== See also ==
- Legislative districts of Guimaras
