= Jordan, Guimaras =

Capital of Guimaras, Philippines

Jordan
- Municipality
- Municipality of Jordan
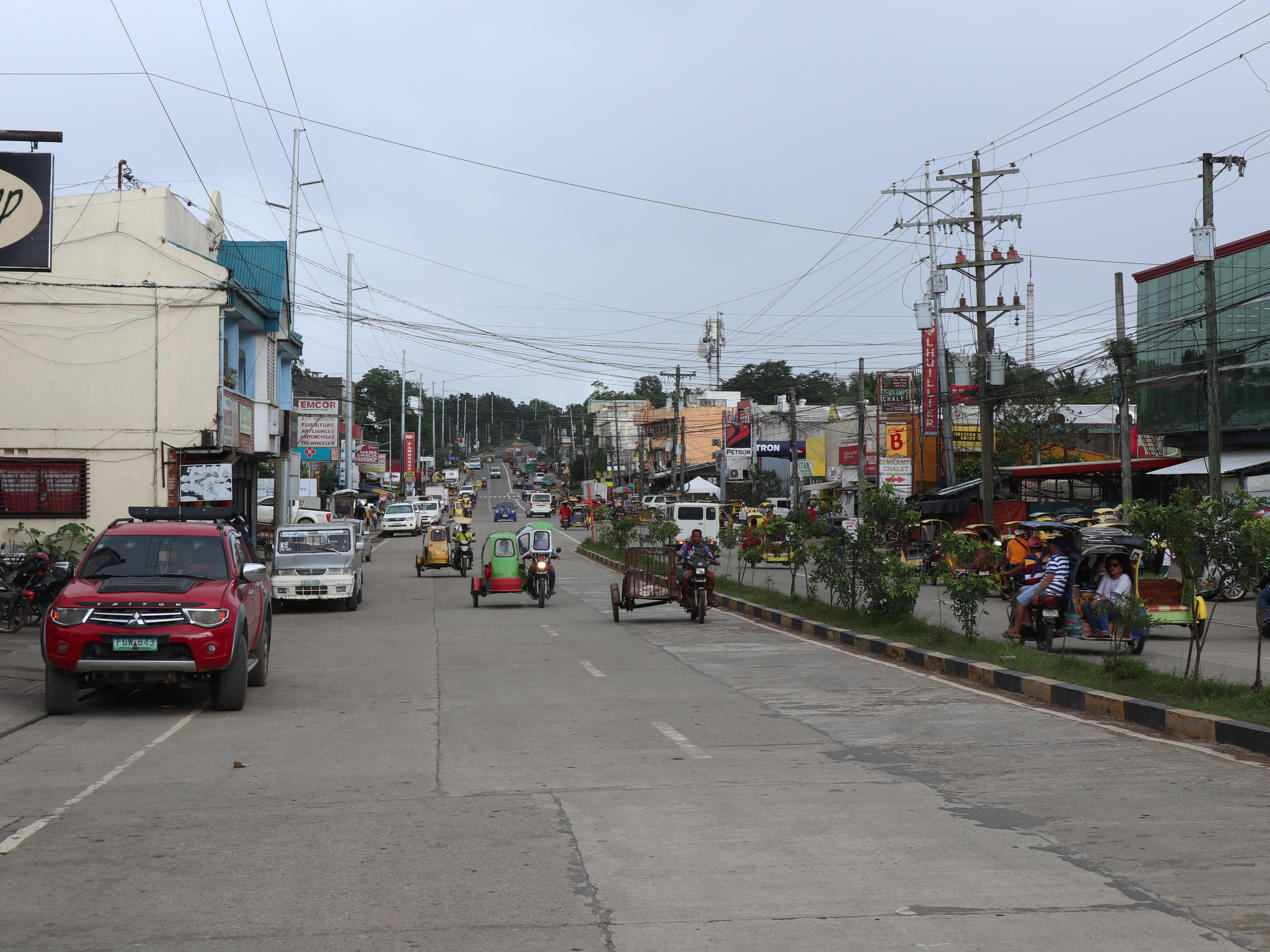
- San Miguel, the town centre of Jordan

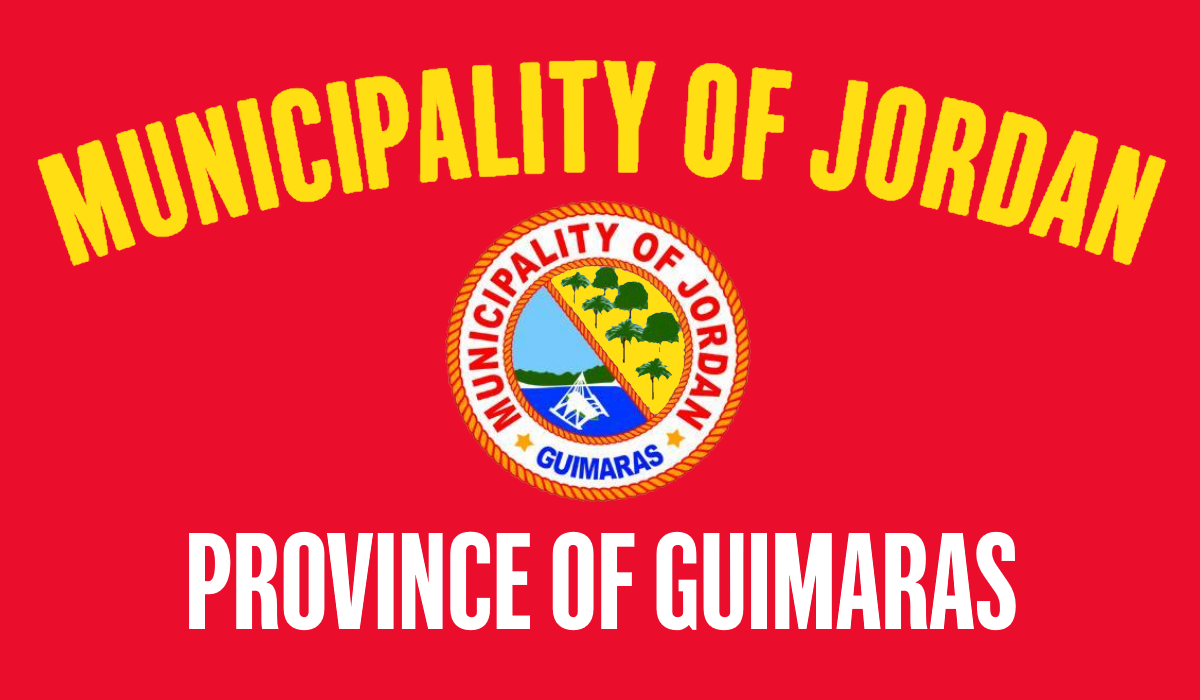
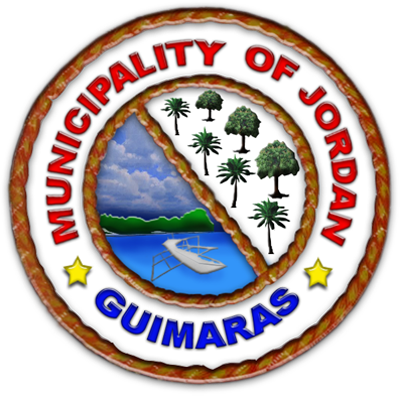
- Flag Seal

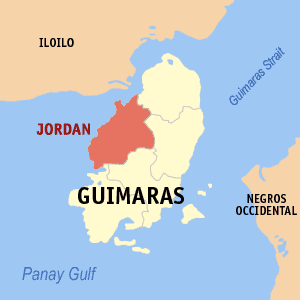
- Map of Guimaras with Jordan highlighted
- Interactive map of Jordan
- Location within the Philippines
- Coordinates: 10°35′46″N 122°35′16″E
- Country: Philippines
- Region: Western Visayas
- Province: Guimaras
- District: Lone district
- Founded: 1918
- Barangays: 14 (see Barangays)

Government
  - Type: Sangguniang Bayan
  - Mayor: John Edward G. Gando (NUP)
  - Vice Mayor: Ana Philippa G. Nava (NUP)
  - Congressman: JC Rahman Nava (NUP)
  - Municipal Council: Members: Katya J Anjella D. Delgado; Gerardo Z. Gaitan; Jovito R. Atienza; Francis Louis E. Corpuz; Ma. Sheila G. Gange; Christian G. Infante; Raymond I. Cruz; Rolyn Faith C. Dellavan
  - Electorate: 26,628 voters (2025)

Area
  - Total: 126.11 km^{2} (48.69 sq mi)

Population (2024 census)
  - Total: 40,647
  - Density: 322.31/km^{2} (834.79/sq mi)

Economy
  - Income class: 2nd municipal income class
  - Poverty incidence: 19.34% (2015)
  - Revenue (₱): ₱ 208.5 million (2024)
  - Assets (₱): ₱ 432 million (2024)
  - Liabilities (₱): ₱ 124.7 million (2024)
  - Expenditure (₱): ₱ 104.7 million (2024)
- Time zone: UTC+8 (PST)
- ZIP code: 5045
- PSGC: 0607902000
- IDD : area code: +63 (0)33
- Native languages: Hiligaynon; Ati; Tagalog
- Website: jordan.gov.ph

Jordan ([hɔ̝ɾdɐn]), officially the Municipality of Jordan (Hiligaynon: Banwa sang Jordan; Tagalog: Bayan ng Jordan), is a municipality and capital of the province of Guimaras, Philippines. According to the 2024 census, it has a population of 40,647 people.

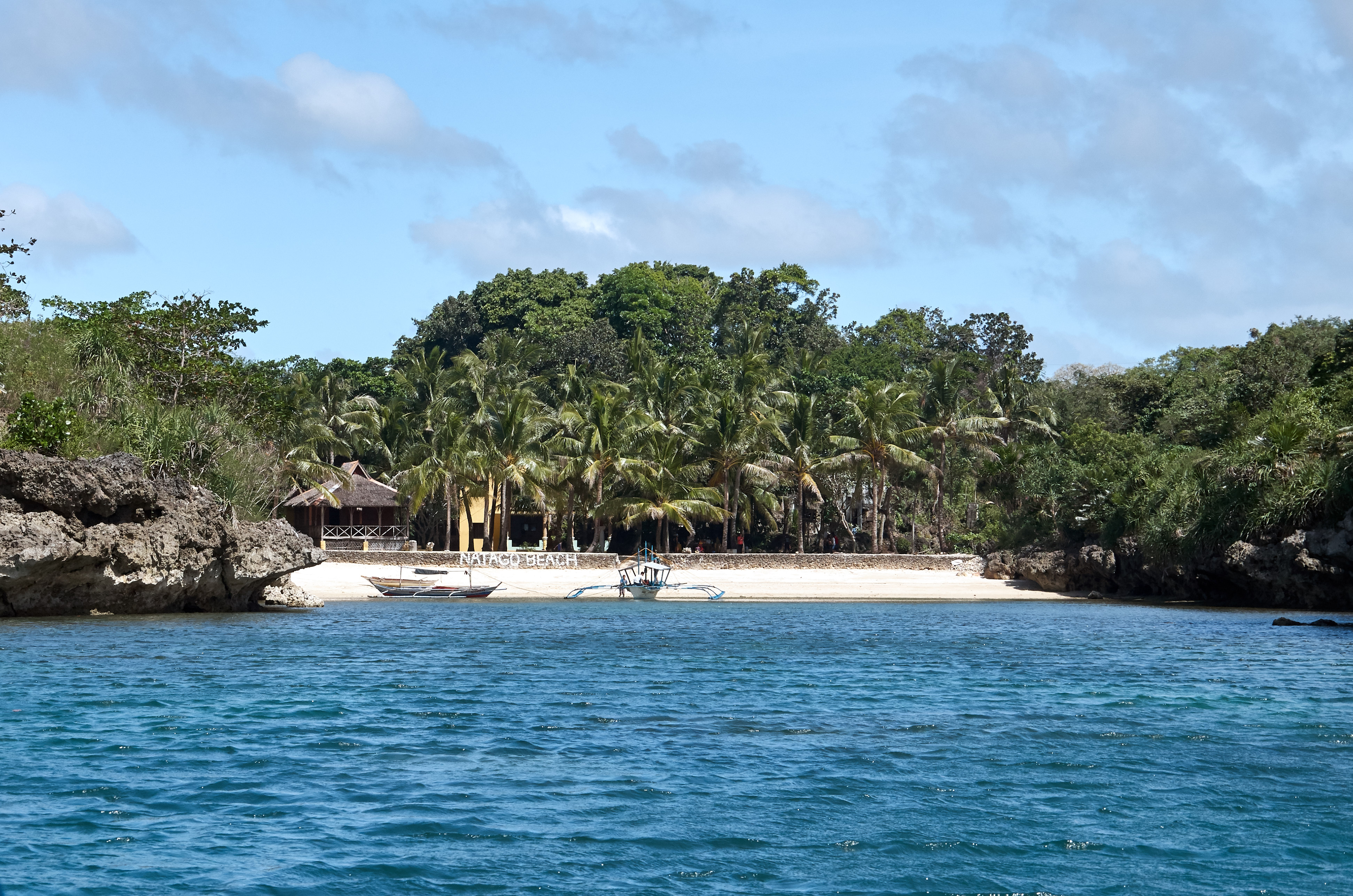
Natago Beach, a sandbar beach that connects two small islands

It is the home of Ang Pagtaltal sa Bulaan Bukid, a reenactment during lenten season that strengthens the local economy and tourism.

== History ==
The name of the town used to be Nagaba but was changed in 1902 to Jordan. The name Jordán, the Spanish name for the Jordan River, was chosen by the residents in honor of John the Baptist, their patron saint. According to local folklore, he saved the inhabitants from slaughter during the Moro raid in the Spanish era.

In 1918, the municipality was formed when it separated from Buenavista, with Valeriano Villanueva as the first appointed Presidente Municipal. After elections in 1919, Hugo Chávez became the next mayor, followed by Licerio Segovia (1921-1923), Alberto Gonzaga (1923-1925), Feliz Ronzales (1925-1928), Hilario Nava (1929-1932), again Hugo Chávez (1932-1938), and Leodegario Galarpe (1939-1941).

Nueva Valencia was established as a separate municipality in 1941. In July 1995 San Lorenzo and Sibunag were created, leaving Jordan with only 14 barangays. Before these two towns was created, Jordan was composed of 33 barangays.

== Geography ==
Jordan is bounded by the three municipalities of the province, Buenavista to the north, San Lorenzo to the east, and Sibunag to the south. Before founding of the five towns, the whole island of Guimaras was called "Himal-us". Across the Iloilo Strait from Jordan is Iloilo City on the island of Panay. Jordan is a part of the Metro Iloilo–Guimaras area, centered on Iloilo City.

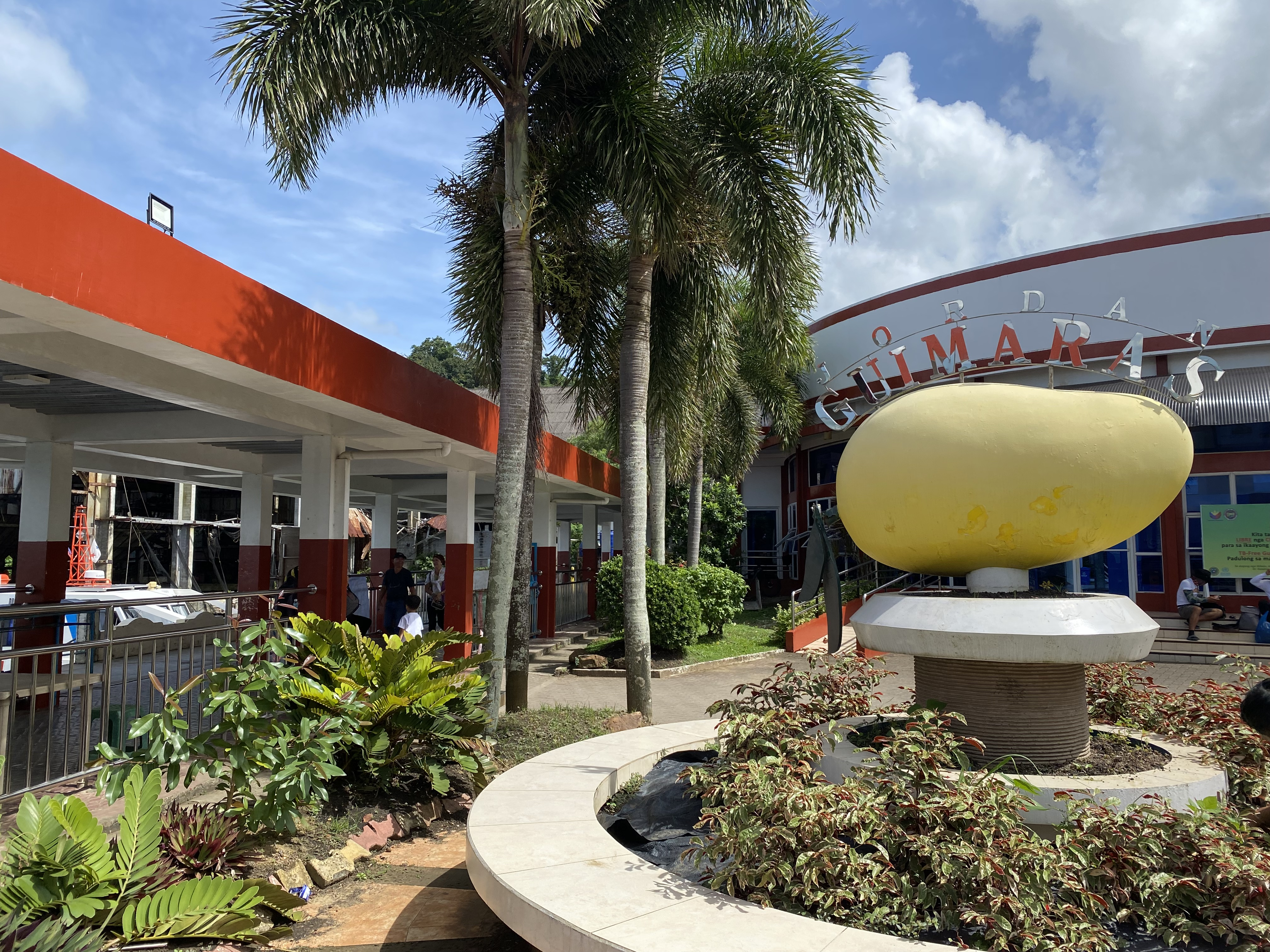
Wharf with mango welcome sign

With a wharf closest to Iloilo City and a central location, Jordan is also the commercial center of the island.

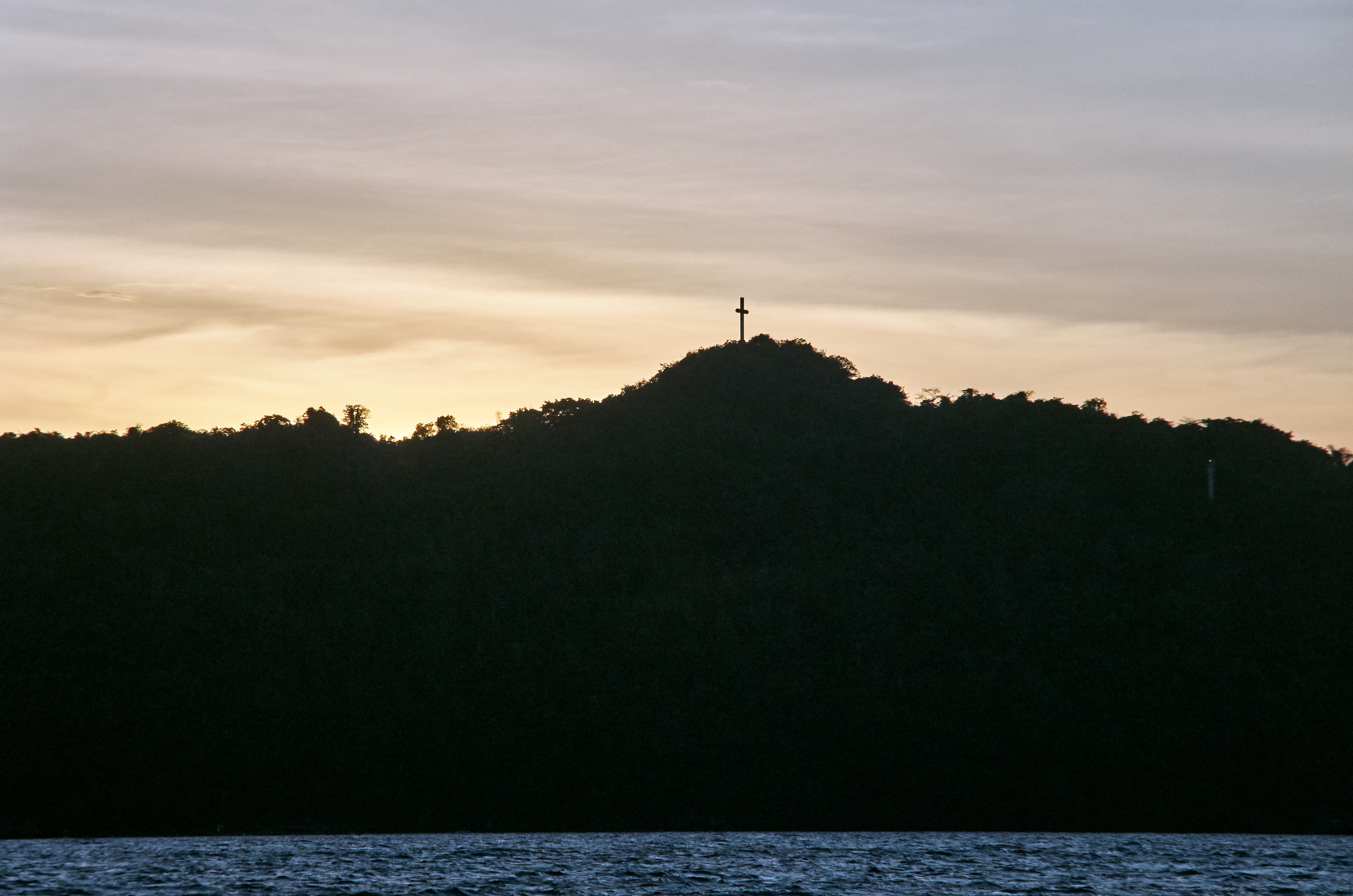
Balaan bukid and the huge holy cross

The Balaan bukid is a 558 feet (170 meters) mountain, located in Barangay Balcon Melliza.

=== Barangays ===
Jordan is subdivided into 14 barangays. Each barangay consists of puroks and some have sitios.

- Alaguisoc
- Balcon Maravilla
- Balcon Melliza
- Bugnay
- Buluangan
- Espinosa
- Hoskyn
- Lawi
- Morobuan
- Poblacion
- Rizal
- San Miguel
- Sinapsapan
- Santa Teresa

=== Climate ===
Climate data for Jordan, Guimaras
Month	Jan	Feb	Mar	Apr	May	Jun	Jul	Aug	Sep	Oct	Nov	Dec	Year
Mean daily maximum °C (°F)	30 (86)	31 (88)	32 (90)	33 (91)	32 (90)	30 (86)	29 (84)	29 (84)	28 (82)	29 (84)	30 (86)	30 (86)	30 (86)
Mean daily minimum °C (°F)	21 (70)	21 (70)	22 (72)	23 (73)	24 (75)	24 (75)	24 (75)	24 (75)	24 (75)	24 (75)	23 (73)	22 (72)	23 (73)
Average precipitation mm (inches)	19 (0.7)	17 (0.7)	26 (1.0)	37 (1.5)	119 (4.7)	191 (7.5)	258 (10.2)	260 (10.2)	248 (9.8)	196 (7.7)	97 (3.8)	39 (1.5)	1,507 (59.3)
Average rainy days	7.2	5.2	8.3	11.9	22.3	26.5	28.3	28.2	27.3	26.4	18.7	11.8	222.1
Source: Meteoblue

== Demographics ==
Jordan Municipal Hall

Population census of Jordan
Year	Pop.	±% p.a.
1903	7,475	—
1918	15,323	+4.90%
1939	23,053	+1.96%
1948	15,677	−4.19%
1960	20,575	+2.29%
1970	27,016	+2.76%
1975	32,474	+3.76%
1980	36,014	+2.09%
1990	45,852	+2.44%
1995	25,321	−10.53%
2000	28,745	+2.76%
2007	32,524	+1.72%
2010	34,791	+2.48%
2015	36,096	+0.70%
2020	39,566	+1.95%
2024	40,647	+0.65%
Source: Philippine Statistics Authority

In the 2024 census, the population of Jordan was 40,647 people, with a density of 320 inhabitants per square kilometre or 830 inhabitants per square mile.

In the 2000 census, in an area of 126 km^{2}., it had a population of 28,745 people in 5,397 households, and in 2007, 32,525 people. In the 2010 census, its population had increased to 34,791 persons.

== Economy ==
Poverty incidence of Jordan (%)

Source: Philippine Statistics Authority

== Education ==
There are three schools district offices which govern all educational institutions within the municipality. They oversee the management and operations of all private and public, from primary to secondary schools. These are the:

- Jordan I Schools District
- Jordan II Schools District
- Sibunag (Jordan III) Schools District

Primary and elementary schools

- Agape Dream Christian Academy
- Alaguisoc Elementary School
- Alejandro Heights Christian School
- Balcon Melliza Elementary School
- Bugnay Elementary School
- Buluangan Elementary School
- Don Pedro Vasquez Memorial School
- Espinosa Elementary School
- Guimaras Baptist Academy
- Guimaras Joyful Pre-school
- History Makers Learning Center
- Hoskyn Elementary School
- Jordan Central School
- Lawi Elementary School
- Manuel Maravilla Memorial School
- Morubuan Elementary School
- Paaralan ng Buhay ng Tamborong
- Ravina Elementary School
- San Miguel Central School
- Seed Park Academy
- Sinapsapan Elementary School
- St. Joseph School-Hijas de Jesus
- Sta. Teresa Elementary School

Secondary schools

- Jordan National High School
- Trinidad V. Canja - Sta. Teresa National High School
