= Antonio del Rosario =

Filipino politician (born 1946)

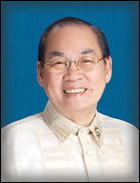
- Official portrait, 2013

22nd Governor of Capiz
- In office June 30, 2016 – June 30, 2019
- Vice Governor: Esteban Evan Contreras II
- Preceded by: Victor Tanco
- Succeeded by: Esteban Evan Contreras II

Member of the Philippine House of Representatives from Capiz's 1st district
- In office June 30, 2007 – June 30, 2016
- Preceded by: Rodriguez Dadivas
- Succeeded by: Tawi Billones

Mayor of Roxas City
- In office June 30, 1998 – June 30, 2007

Personal details
- Born: April 13, 1946 (age 80) Roxas, Capiz, Philippines
- Party: PFP (2024–present)
- Other political affiliations: Liberal (1986–2024)
- Spouse: Suzette Atienza del Rosario
- Children: Michelle, Suzzane, Let-let, Marcu and Pepe
- Occupation: Businessman
- Profession: Politician

Antonio Andrada del Rosario (born April 13, 1946) is a Filipino politician from Capiz. A member of the Liberal Party, he served as governor of Capiz from 2016 to 2019, and was the representative of the 1st district of Capiz from 2007 to 2016. He served three terms as mayor of Roxas City from 1998 to 2007.

== Notes ==
Political offices
Preceded by Victor Tanco Sr.	Governor of Capiz; 2016–2019	Succeeded by Esteban Evan Contreras II
House of Representatives of the Philippines
Preceded by Rodriguez Dadivas	Member of the House of Representatives from Capiz's 1st district 2017–2016	Succeeded by Tawi Billones
