= Samuel Gumarin =

Filipino politician

The Honorable Samuel Gumarin

4th Governor of Guimaras
- In office June 30, 2013 – June 30, 2022
- Preceded by: Felipe Hilian Nava
- Succeeded by: Joaquin Carlos Rahman A. Nava

Mayor of Buenavista, Guimaras
- Incumbent
- Assumed office June 30, 2022
- In office June 30, 2004 – June 30, 2013

Personal details
- Born: June 26, 1962 (age 64) Buenavista, Iloilo Philippines
- Party: NUP (2024–present)
- Other political affiliations: PDP–Laban (2018–2024); Liberal (2010–2018); Lakas (2008–2010); KAMPI (until 2008)
- Education: West Visayas State University
- Occupation: physician

Samuel Tayo Gumarin is a Filipino physician and politician from the province of Guimaras in the Philippines. He previously serving as a Governor of Guimaras from 2013 to 2022. He was first elected as Governor of the province in 2013 and was re-elected in 2016 and 2019 running as a re-electionist under the PDP–Laban party in the May 13, 2019 election.

Political offices
Preceded by Felipe Hilian Nava	Governor of Guimaras; 2013–2022	Succeeded by Joaquin Carlos Nava
