= Governor of Capiz =

- Punong Lalawigan ng Capiz
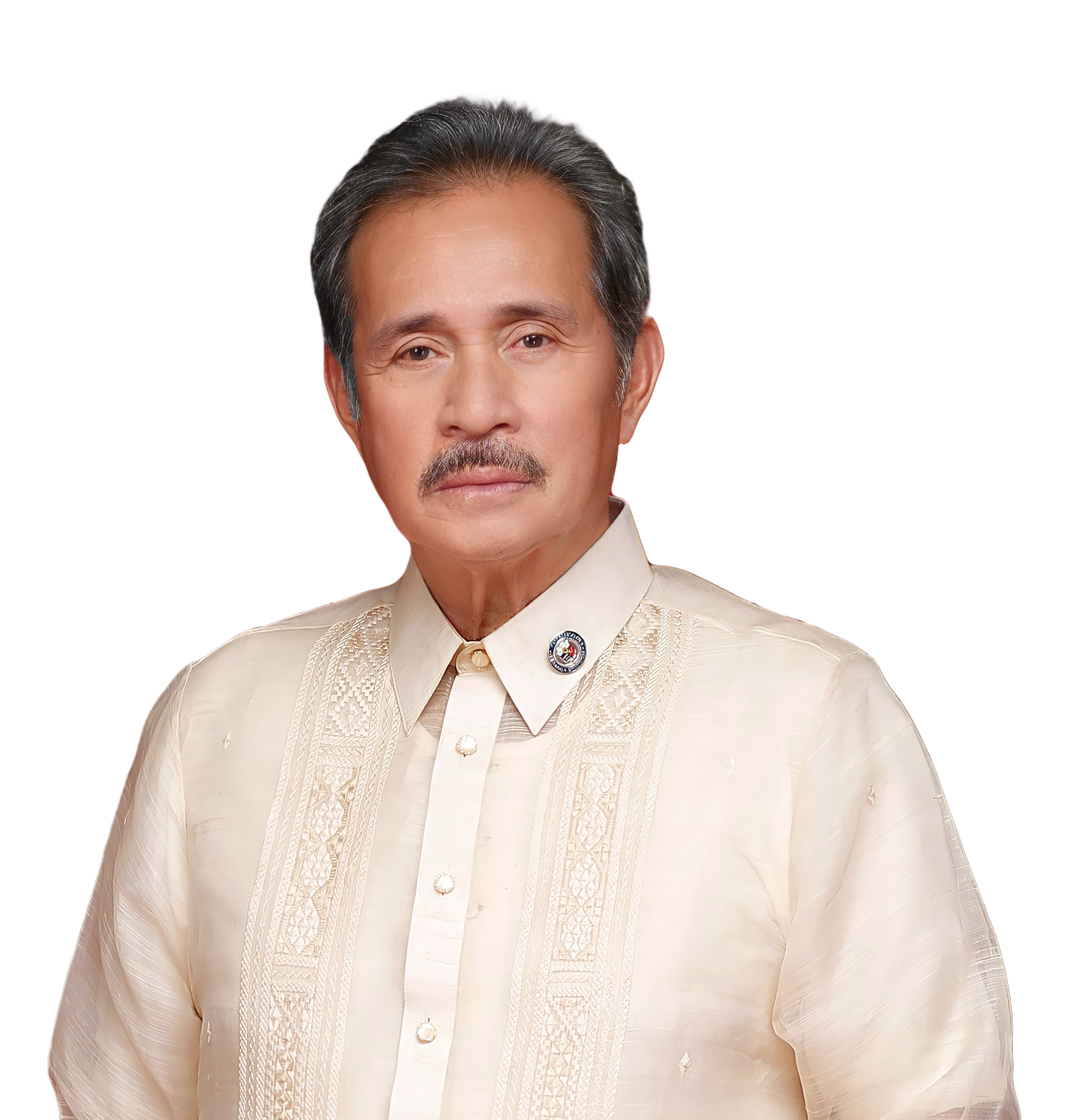
- Incumbent; Fredenil H. Castro since June 30, 2022
- Style: The Honorable
- Residence: Governor's Mansion
- Seat: Capiz Provincial Capitol
- Appointer: Direct popular vote
- Term length: 3 years, not eligible for re-election immediately after three consecutive terms
- Constituting instrument: Philippine Commission Act No. 83; Republic Act No. 7160
- Inaugural holder: Simplicio Jugo Vidal
- Formation: April 15, 1901
- Salary: ₱185,695.00 - ₱207,978.00 (monthly; Salary Grade 30 as of January 1, 2022)

The governor of Capiz is the chief executive of the provincial government of Capiz, Philippines.

The provincial government of Capiz had jurisdiction over Romblon from 1907 to 1917 and Aklan from 1901 to 1956.

The current governor is Fredenil H. Castro of One Capiz.

== Governors of Capiz ==
No.	Name	Portrait	Term of Office	Place of origin
1	Simplicio Jugo Vidal		1901-1903	Capiz (Renamed Roxas City in 1951)
2	Simeon Mobo Reyes		1904-1906	Lezo (now part of Aklan)
	Emiliano Baltazar Acevedo (Acting Governor)		1906-1907	Kalibo (now part of Aklan)
3	Antonio Habana		1907-1910	Cuartero
4	Jose Altavas		1910-1916	Balete (now part of Aklan)
5	Jose Hontiveros		1916-1919	Tangalan (now part of Aklan)
6	Manuel Roxas		1919-1922	Capiz
7	Rafael Acuña		1922-1932	Capiz
8	Gabriel Hernandez		1932-1942	Capiz
9	Cornelio Villareal		1942-1945	Mambusao
10	Alfredo V. Jacinto (Acting Governor)		January 21, 1944 – December 20, 1944	
11	Ludovico Hidrosollo		1947-1951	Dumarao
12	Eduardo Abalo		1952-1956	
13	Jose Dinglasan		1956-1959	Capiz
14	Atila Balgos		1960-1962	
15	Filomeno Villanueva		1962-1965	
16	Antonio Reyes, Sr.		1965-1967	Sigma
17	Cornelio Villareal, Jr.		1968-1987	Mambusao
18	Jose Borda		1988-1992	
19	Esteban Evan E. Contreras		1992-1998	Pontevedra
20	Vicente Bermejo		1998-2007	Panay
21	Victor Tanco		2007-2016	Dumarao
22	Antonio del Rosario		2016-2019	Roxas City
23	Esteban Evan B. Contreras II		2019-2022	Pontevedra
24	Fredenil H. Castro		Incumbent	Dumalag
