= Governor of Guimaras =

Local chief executive

Provincial Governor of Guimaras
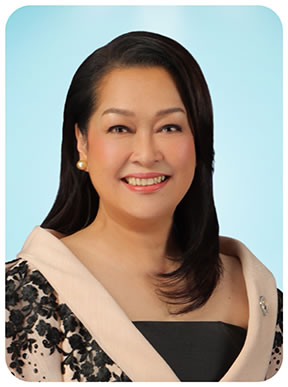
- Incumbent; Lucille Nava since June 30, 2025
- Appointer: Elected via popular vote
- Term length: 3 years
- Inaugural holder: Emily Lopez
- Formation: 1992
- Website: https://guimaras.gov.ph/governor/

The governor of Guimaras (Filipino: Punong Panlalawigan ng Guimaras), is the chief executive of the provincial government of Guimaras.

== Governors of the Sub-province of Guimaras (1966–1992) ==
No.	Image	Governor	Term
1		Antonio G. Ortiz	1966–1984
2		Conrado J. Norada	1984
3		Leopoldo H. Locsin	1984–1986
4		Catalino G. Nava	1986
5		Abelardo D. Javellana	1986–1988
(4)		Catalino G. Nava	1988–1992

== Provincial Governors (1992–present) ==
No.	Image	Governor	Term
1		Emily R. Lopez	1992–1998
2		Joaquin Carlos Rahman A. Nava	1998–2007
3		Felipe Hilan A. Nava	2007–2013
4		Samuel T. Gumarin	2013–2022
5		Joaquin Carlos Rahman A. Nava	2022–2025
6		Lucille Nava	2025–present
