= JC Rahman Nava =

Filipino politician & physician (born 1962)

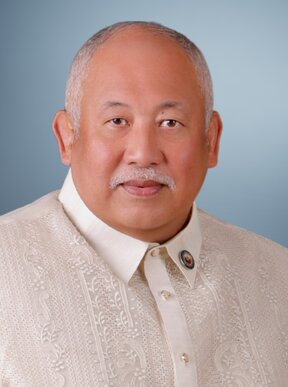
- Official portrait, 2025

Member of the House of Representatives from Guimaras's Lone District
- Incumbent
- Assumed office June 30, 2025
- Preceded by: Ma. Lucille Nava
- In office June 30, 2007 – June 30, 2016
- Preceded by: Edgar Espinosa
- Succeeded by: Ma. Lucille Nava

2nd & 5th Governor of Guimaras
- In office June 30, 2022 – June 30, 2025
- Preceded by: Samuel Gumarin
- Succeeded by: Lucille Nava
- In office June 30, 1998 – June 30, 2007
- Preceded by: Emily Lopez
- Succeeded by: Felipe Nava

Personal details
- Born: Joaquin Carlos Rahman Araño Nava; November 19, 1962 (age 63)
- Party: NUP (2021–present)
- Other political affiliations: PDP–Laban (2016–2021); Liberal (2004–2007; 2010–2016); Lakas (2007–2010); LDP (2001–2004); LAMMP (1998–2001)
- Spouse: Ma. Lucille Nava
- Education: West Visayas State University (MD)
- Occupation: Politician
- Profession: Physician

Joaquin Carlos "JC" Rahman Araño Nava (born November 19, 1962) is a Filipino politician and physician who serves as representative for the lone district of Guimaras. He previously served as Governor of Guimaras from 2022 to 2025.

== Education ==
Nava completed his elementary education at Colegio del Sagrado Corazon de Jesus and his secondary education at University of San Agustin. He obtained his Doctor of Medicine degree at West Visayas State University.

== Career ==
Nava entered government when he served as a legislative staff officer of the Guimaras Lone District, which was then represented by Edgar Espinosa during the 10th Congress of the Philippines.

Nava was governor of the province of Guimaras from 1998 to 2007. He later served as representative of Guimaras from 2007 to 2016. He returned as Guimaras governor after winning in the 2022 election.

== Personal life ==
Nava is part of a political family. He is married to Maria Lucille Nava who serves as Guimaras' representative in the House of Representatives since 2016, while his brother Felipe "Nene" Nava is a provincial board member of the same province.
