= Iloilo (disambiguation) =

Iloilo is a province of the Philippines located in the Western Visayas region.

Iloilo may also refer to:

== Places ==
- Iloilo City, a highly urbanized city and capital of Iloilo but independent from the provincial government
  - Iloilo City Proper, an administrative district of Iloilo City
  - Iloilo Central Business District, a historic commercial district in Iloilo City
  - Iloilo Business Park, a central business district in Iloilo City
- Metro Iloilo–Guimaras or Iloilo–Guimaras Metropolitan Area, a metropolitan area centered on Iloilo City

=== Rivers and geographical features ===
- Iloilo River
- Iloilo Strait

== Schools ==
- University of Iloilo, a private university in Iloilo City
- Iloilo Science and Technology University, a public university in Iloilo City
- Iloilo Doctors' College, a private college in Iloilo City
- Northern Iloilo State University, a public university in Estancia, Iloilo
- Iloilo State University of Fisheries Science and Technology, a public university in Barotac Nuevo, Iloilo
- Iloilo City National High School, a public high school in Iloilo City

== Transportation ==
- Iloilo International Airport, an international airport in Cabatuan, Iloilo, that serves the metropolitan area of Iloilo City
- Port of Iloilo, a seaport in Iloilo City
- Iloilo Fish Port Complex, a fishing port in Iloilo City
- Iloilo Bridge, a bridge in Iloilo City

== People ==
- Josefa Iloilo (1920–2011), Fijian politician and President of Fiji (2000–2006; 2007–2009)
- Kavu Iloilo (née Salaseini Kavunono; 1952–2020), First Lady of Fiji and fourth wife of Josefa Iloilo, better known as Adi Kavu

== Other ==
- Iloilo tree or Aglaia argentea, a species of tree native to Iloilo province
- BRP Iloilo (PS-32), a Philippine Navy corvette
- Ilo Ilo, a 2013 Singaporean film
- Iloilo-Negros Air Express, an airline company based in the Philippines

== See also ==
- Hiligaynon (disambiguation)
