= List of Dinagyang Tribes Competition winners =

Winners of Philippines annual competition

The complete list of winners of the Dinagyang Tribes Competition, also known as the Ati Tribes Competition or the Ati-atihan Contest, during the Dinagyang Festival, held annually on the fourth Sunday of January at the Iloilo Freedom Grandstand in Iloilo City, Philippines.

The annual winner of the competition receives a cash prize and a trophy. They also gets a chance to perform at the year’s Philippine Independence Day rites in New York City. They will also represent Dinagyang in the Aliwan Fiesta held annually in the Star City Complex in Pasay, Metro Manila, where they will compete in the dance competition category against other winning groups from festivals across the country.

== Winners by year ==
Winners of the Dinagyang Tribes Competition
Year	Winner	Representing	Location	Ref.
2026	Tribu Salognon	Jaro National High School	Jaro, Iloilo City	
2025	Tribu Paghidaet	La Paz National High School	La Paz, Iloilo City	
2024	Tribu Pan-ay	Fort San Pedro National High School	Iloilo City Proper	
2023	Tribu Parianon	District of Molo	Molo, Iloilo City	
2022	Tribu La Paz	District of La Paz	La Paz, Iloilo City	
2021	No specific winner			
2020	Tribu Paghidaet	La Paz National High School	La Paz, Iloilo City	
2019	Tribu Ilonganon	Jalandoni Memorial National High School	Lapuz, Iloilo City	
2018	Tribu Panayanon	Iloilo City National High School	Molo, Iloilo City	
2017	Tribu Salognon	Jaro National High School	Jaro, Iloilo City	
2016	Tribu Salognon	Jaro National High School	Jaro, Iloilo City	
2015	Tribu Panayanon	Iloilo City National High School	Molo, Iloilo City	
2014	Tribu Panayanon	Iloilo City National High School	Molo, Iloilo City	
2013	Tribu Panayanon	Iloilo City National High School	Molo, Iloilo City	
2012	Tribu Pan-ay	Fort San Pedro National High School	Iloilo City Proper	
2011	Tribu Pan-ay	Fort San Pedro National High School	Iloilo City Proper	
2010	Tribu Paghidaet	La Paz National High School	La Paz, Iloilo City	
2009	Tribu Paghidaet	La Paz National High School	La Paz, Iloilo City	
2008	Tribu Paghidaet	La Paz National High School	La Paz, Iloilo City	
2007	Tribu Ilonganon	Jalandoni Memorial National High School	Lapuz, Iloilo City	
2006	Tribu Ilonganon	Jalandoni Memorial National High School	Lapuz, Iloilo City	
2005	Tribu Pag-asa (Barangay Category)	Barangay Pale Benedicto Rizal	Mandurriao, Iloilo City	
2005	Tribu Silak (Open Category)	Iloilo City National High School	Molo, Iloilo City	
2004	Tribu Atub-atub (Barangay Category)	Barangay Veterans Village	Iloilo City Proper	
2004	Tribu Bola-bola (Open Category)	Iloilo National High School	La Paz, Iloilo City	
2003	Tribu Atub-atub (Barangay Category)	Barangay Veterans Village	Iloilo City Proper	
2003	Tribu Paghidaet (Open Category)	La Paz National High School	La Paz, Iloilo City	
2002	Tribu Molave (Barangay Category)	Barangay Rizal Estanzuela	Iloilo City Proper	
2002	Tribu Paghidaet (Open Category)	La Paz National High School	La Paz, Iloilo City	
2001	Tribu Molave (Barangay Category)	Barangay Rizal Estanzuela	Iloilo City Proper	
2001	Tribu Bola-bola (Open Category)	Iloilo National High School	La Paz, Iloilo City	
2000	Tribu Atub-atub (Barangay Category)	Barangay Veterans Village	Iloilo City Proper	
2000	Tribu Bola-bola (Open Category)	Iloilo National High School	La Paz, Iloilo City	
1999	Tribu Panaad (Barangay Category)	Ortiz Street	Iloilo City Proper	
1999	Tribu Bola-bola (Open Category)	Iloilo National High School	La Paz, Iloilo City	
1998	Tribu Hamili (Barangay Category)	Barangay General Hughes-Montes	Iloilo City Proper	
1998	Tribu Bola-bola (Open Category)	Iloilo National High School	La Paz, Iloilo City	
1997	Tribu Bola-bola	Iloilo National High School	La Paz, Iloilo City	
1996	Tribu Bola-bola	Iloilo National High School	La Paz, Iloilo City	
1995	Tribu Binirayan	Province of Antique	Antique	
1994	Tribu Bola-bola	Iloilo National High School	La Paz, Iloilo City	
1993	Tribu Panaad	Ortiz Street	Iloilo City Proper	
1992	Tribu Sagasa	Sagasa Street, Barangay Santo Rosario-Duran	Iloilo City Proper	
1991	Tribu Sagasa	Sagasa Street, Barangay Santo Rosario-Duran	Iloilo City Proper	
1990	Tribu Sagasa	Sagasa Street, Barangay Santo Rosario-Duran	Iloilo City Proper	
1989	Tribu Binirayan	Province of Antique	Antique	
1988	Tribu Kongo	Barangay Pale Benedicto Rizal	Mandurriao, Iloilo City	
1987	Tribu Guimbal	Municipality of Guimbal	Guimbal, Iloilo	
1986	Tribu Kongo	Barangay Pale Benedicto Rizal	Mandurriao, Iloilo City	
1985	Tribu Kongo	Barangay Pale Benedicto Rizal	Mandurriao, Iloilo City	
1984	Tribu Atub-atub	Barangay Veterans Village	Iloilo City Proper	
1983	Tribu Binirayan	Province of Antique	Antique	
1982	Tribu Atub-atub	Barangay Veterans Village	Iloilo City Proper	
1981	Tribu Molave	Barangay Veterans Village	Iloilo City Proper	
1980	Tribu Himaya	Barangay General Hughes-Montes	Iloilo City Proper	
1979	No specific winner			
1978	Tribu Atub-atub	Barangay Veterans Village	Iloilo City Proper	
1977	No competition held			
1976	Tribu Hamili	Barangay General Hughes-Montes	Iloilo City Proper	
1975	Tribu Hamili	Barangay General Hughes-Montes	Iloilo City Proper	
1974	Last Warriors	Panaderia de Molo	Molo, Iloilo City	
1973	Mamau Tribe	Negros Navigation	NHA Mandurriao, Iloilo City	
1972	Mamau Tribe	Negros Navigation	NHA Mandurriao, Iloilo City	
1971	Mamau Tribe	Negros Navigation	NHA Mandurriao, Iloilo City	
1970	Madjapahit Tribe	Compania Maritima	Legaspi dela Rama, Iloilo City Proper	

== Tribes with multiple wins ==
=== By tribes ===
The following tribes have won the Dinagyang Tribes Competition more than once. The list does not consolidate the different names of a tribe used by the same organization or institution when they won in different years.

Tribes with multiple Dinagyang Tribes Competition wins
Wins	Name	Years
8	Tribu Bola-bola	1994, 1996, 1997, 1998, 1999, 2000, 2001, 2004
7	Tribu Paghidaet	2002, 2003, 2008, 2009, 2010, 2020, 2025
6	Tribu Atub-atub	1978, 1982, 1984, 2000, 2003, 2004
4	Tribu Panayanon	2013, 2014, 2015, 2018
3	Mamau Tribe	1971, 1972, 1973
3	Tribu Hamili	1975, 1976, 1998
3	Tribu Molave	1981, 2001, 2002
3	Tribu Binirayan	1983, 1989, 1995
3	Tribu Kongo	1985, 1986, 1988
3	Tribu Sagasa	1990, 1991, 1992
3	Tribu Ilonganon	2006, 2007, 2019
3	Tribu Pan-ay	2011, 2012, 2024
3	Tribu Salognon	2016, 2017, 2026
2	Tribu Panaad	1993, 1999

=== By organizations or institutions ===
The following list is sorted based on the organizations or institutions whose tribes, with different names under them, have won the competition more than once.

Organizations or institutions with multiple Dinagyang Tribes Competition wins
Wins	Name	Tribe(s)	Year(s)
8	Iloilo National High School	Tribu Bola-bola	1994, 1996, 1997, 1998, 1999, 2000, 2001, 2004
7	Barangay Veterans Village	Tribu Atub-atub	1978, 1982, 1984, 2000, 2003, 2004
7	Barangay Veterans Village	Tribu Molave	1981
7	La Paz National High School	Tribu Paghidaet	2002, 2003, 2008, 2009, 2010, 2020, 2025
5	Iloilo City National High School	Tribu Silak	2005
5	Iloilo City National High School	Tribu Panayanon	2013, 2014, 2015, 2018
4	Barangay General Hughes-Montes	Tribu Hamili	1975, 1976, 1998
4	Barangay General Hughes-Montes	Tribu Himaya	1980
4	Barangay Pale Benedicto Rizal	Tribu Kongo	1985, 1986, 1988
4	Barangay Pale Benedicto Rizal	Tribu Pag-asa	2005
3	Negros Navigation	Mamau Tribe	1971, 1972, 1973
3	Province of Antique	Tribu Binirayan	1983, 1989, 1995
3	Sagasa Street, Barangay Santo Rosario-Duran	Tribu Sagasa	1990, 1991, 1992
3	Jalandoni Memorial National High School	Tribu Ilonganon	2006, 2007, 2019
3	Fort San Pedro National High School	Tribu Pan-ay	2011, 2012, 2024
3	Jaro National High School	Tribu Salognon	2016, 2017, 2026
2	Ortiz Street	Tribu Panaad	1993, 1999
2	Barangay Rizal Estanzuela	Tribu Molave	2001, 2002

== Other tribes competitions ==
The following lists are of the annual winners of newly added tribes competitions, namely ILOmination and Sadsad sa Calle Real.

Winners of the ILOmination Tribes Competition
Year	Winner	Representing	Location	Ref.
2026	Bana-ag Festival	Municipality of Anilao	Anilao, Iloilo	
2025	Bailes de Luces	Municipality of La Castellana	La Castellana, Negros Occidental	
2024	Tribu Sidlangan	District of Lapuz	Lapuz, Iloilo City	
2023	Tribu La Paz	District of La Paz	La Paz, Iloilo City	

Winners of the Sadsad sa Calle Real Tribes Competition
Year	Winner	Representing	Location	Ref.
2026	Tribu Parianon	District of Molo	Molo, Iloilo City	
2025	Tribu Familia Sagasa	District of City Proper	Iloilo City Proper	
2024	Tribu Molave	District of Mandurriao	Mandurriao, Iloilo City	

== See also ==
- Kasadyahan Festival winners

== Enternal links ==
- Dinagyang Festival
- Iloilo Festivals Foundation, Inc.
