= Molo Plaza =

Public plaza in Molo, Iloilo City

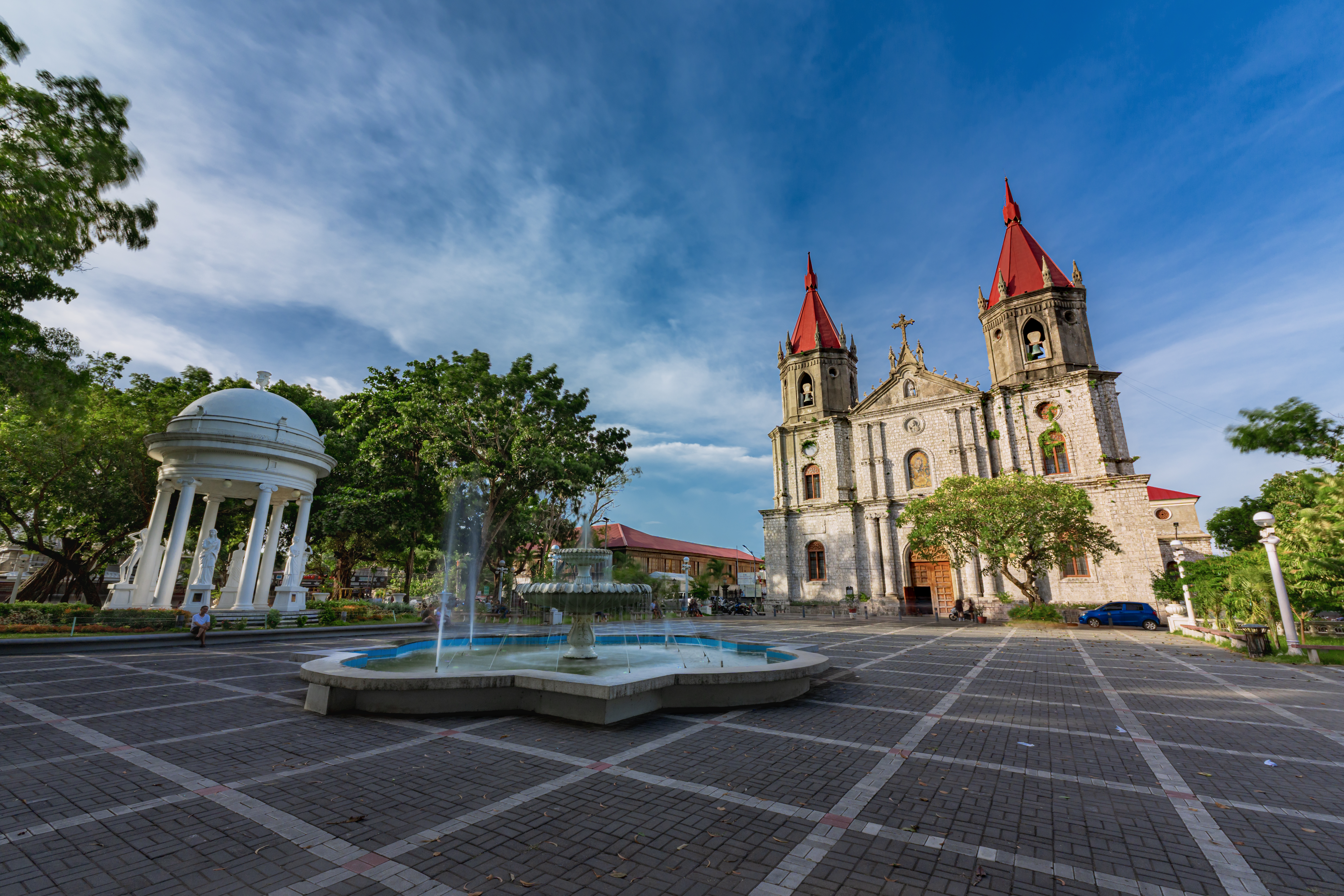
- Molo Plaza with the Molo Church in the background
- Interactive map of Molo Plaza
- Type: Urban park, town square
- Location: Molo, Iloilo City, Philippines
- Coordinates: 10°41′49″N 122°32′39″E
- Area: 1.06 hectares (2.6 acres)
- Established: 1920s
- Operator: Iloilo City Government

Molo Plaza is an urban park and town square located in the district of Molo in Iloilo City, Philippines. It is one of the six district plazas in Iloilo City.

The plaza features statues of Greek goddesses and the monument of Maria Clara. A fountain was also installed to break the monotony of the artworks during the rehabilitation in August 2022.

Molo Plaza was constructed in the 1920s as the town square of the then-independent municipality of Molo. Under the 1939 Code of Ordinances of the City of Iloilo, the park was officially designated as Plaza Melliza. It is surrounded by popular landmarks such as Molo Mansion and St. Anne Parish Church, also known as Molo Church.

== Rehabilitation ==
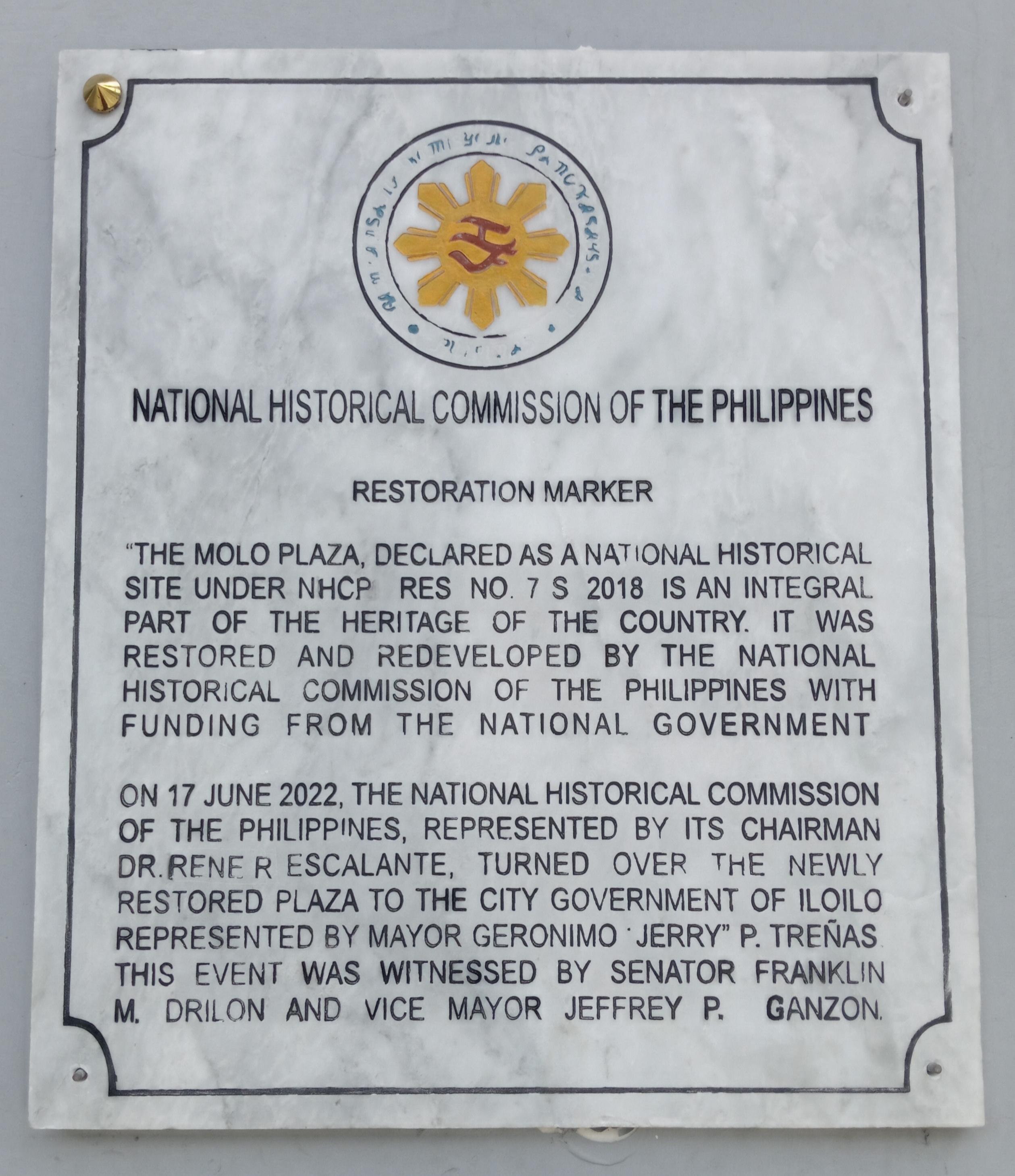
Restoration Marker

On June 17, 2022, the National Historical Commission of the Philippines (NHCP) formally turned over the newly restored Molo Plaza after months of rehabilitation. Among the PHP20 million restoration at the plaza are the statues of Greek goddesses and the monument of Maria Clara. A fountain was also installed.

Molo Plaza was one of the six district plazas in the city to have undergone a yearlong rehabilitation.

== Gallery ==
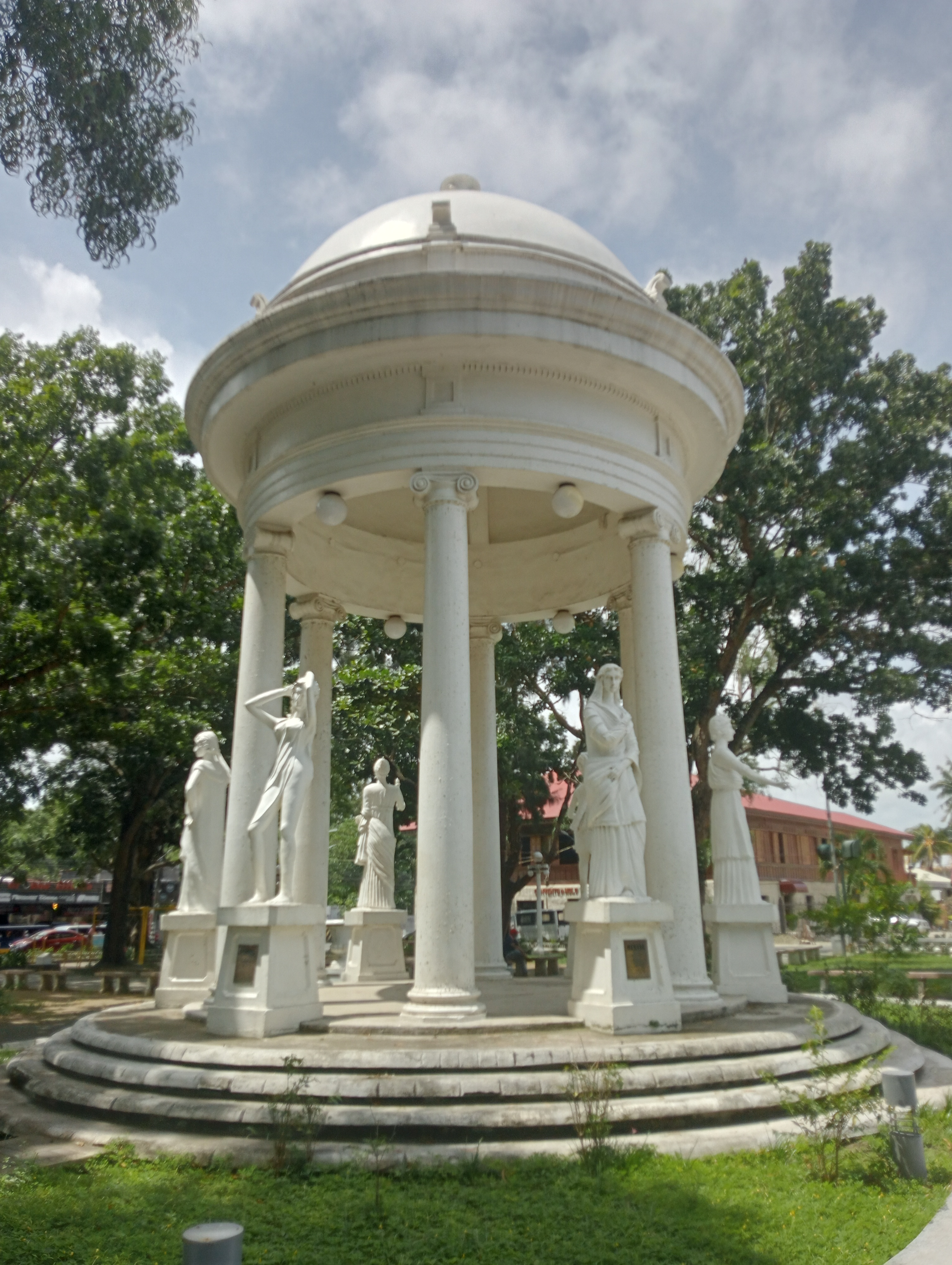
Bandstand

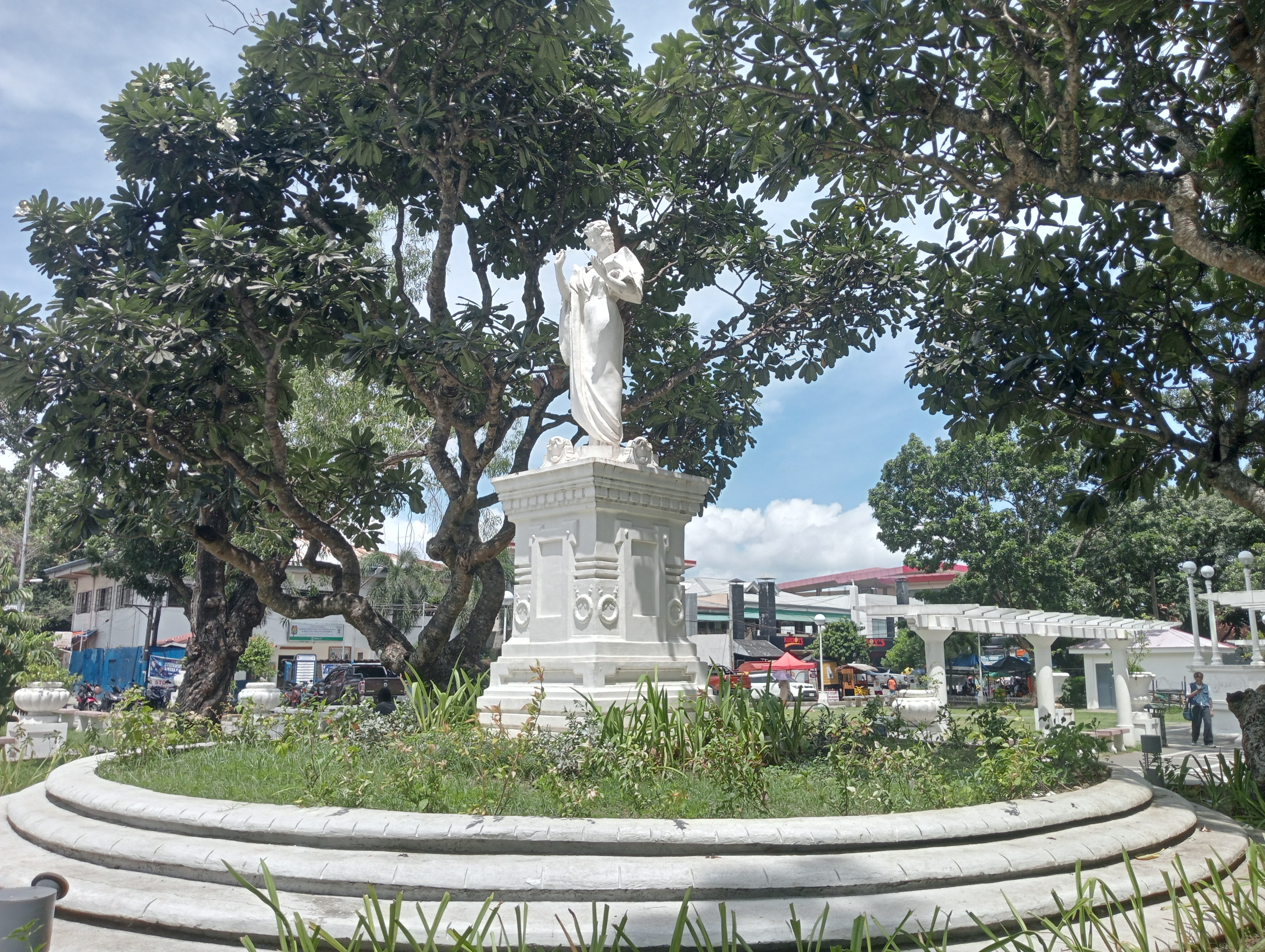
Maria Clara Statue

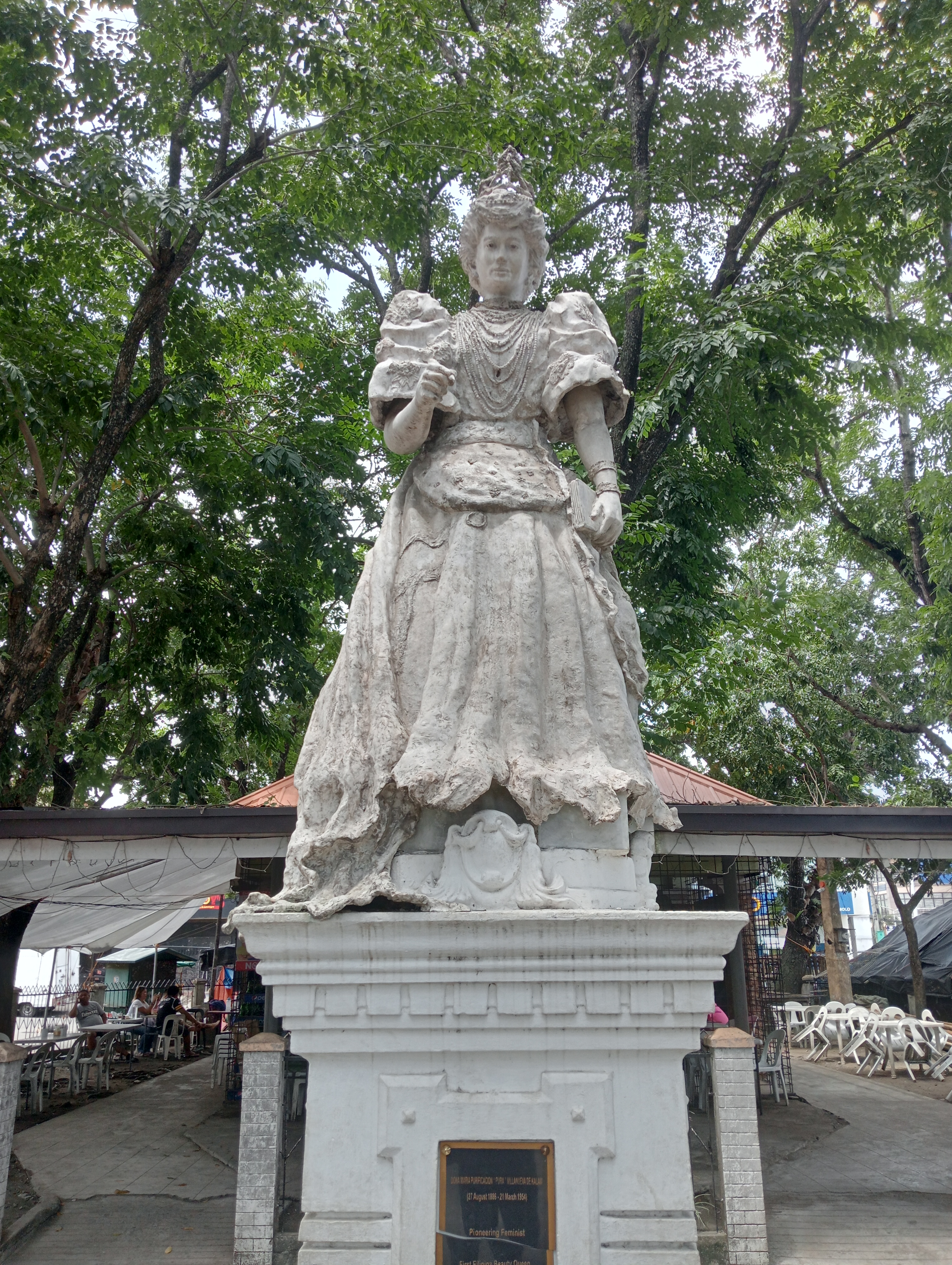
Doña Pura Villanueva de Kalaw Monument

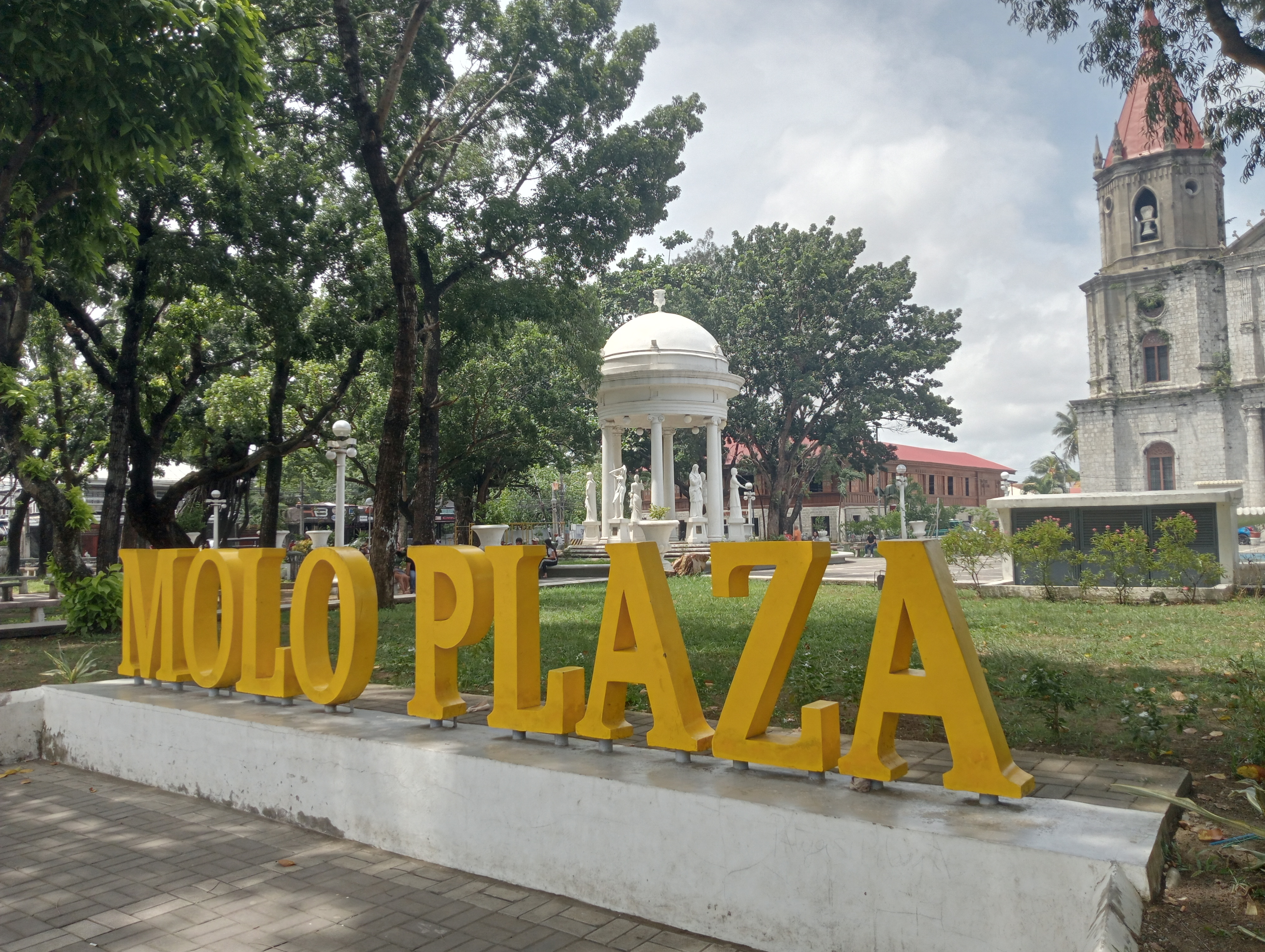
Molo Plaza signage

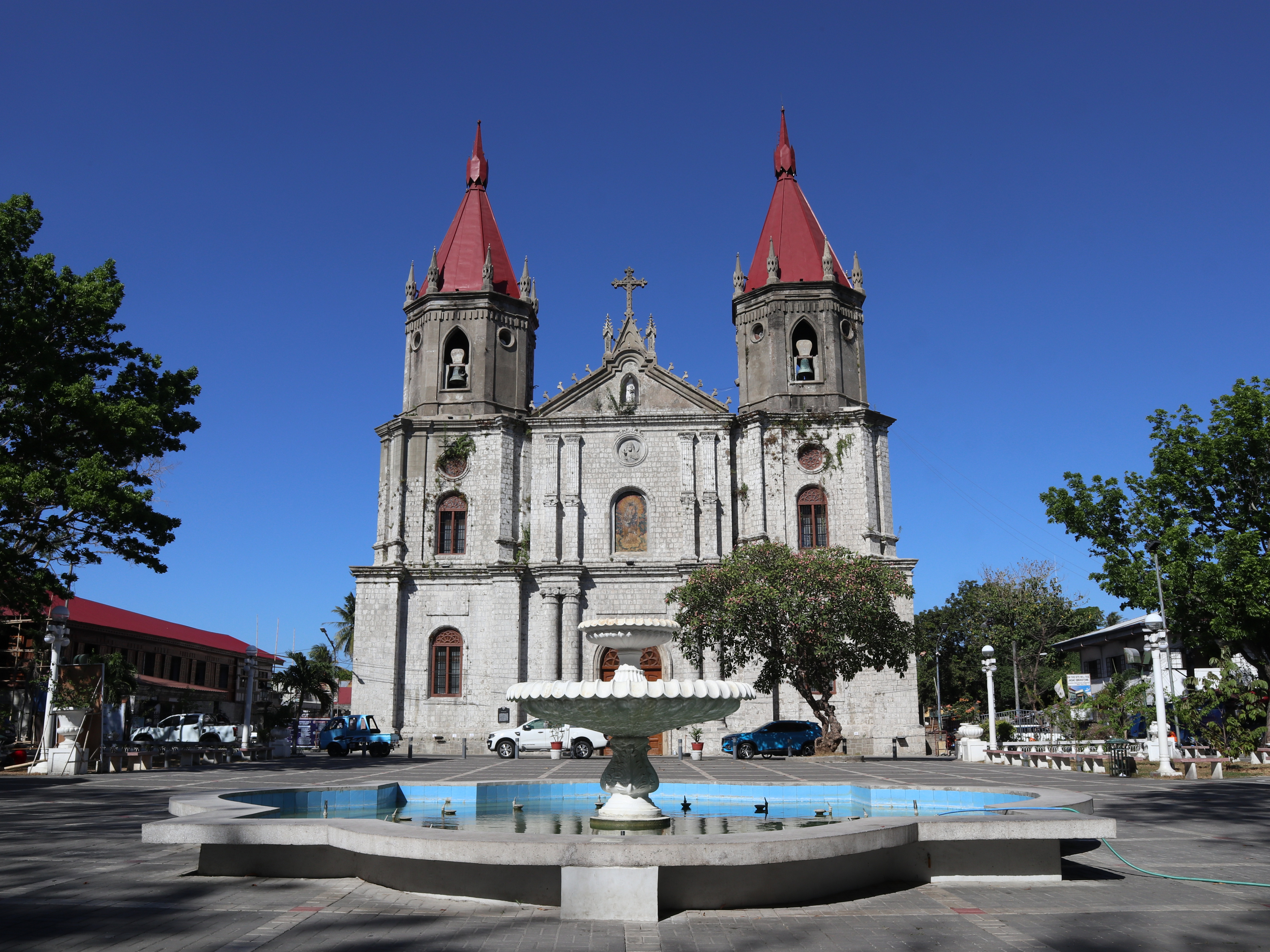
Fountain
