= Molo Mansion =

Historic house in the Philippines

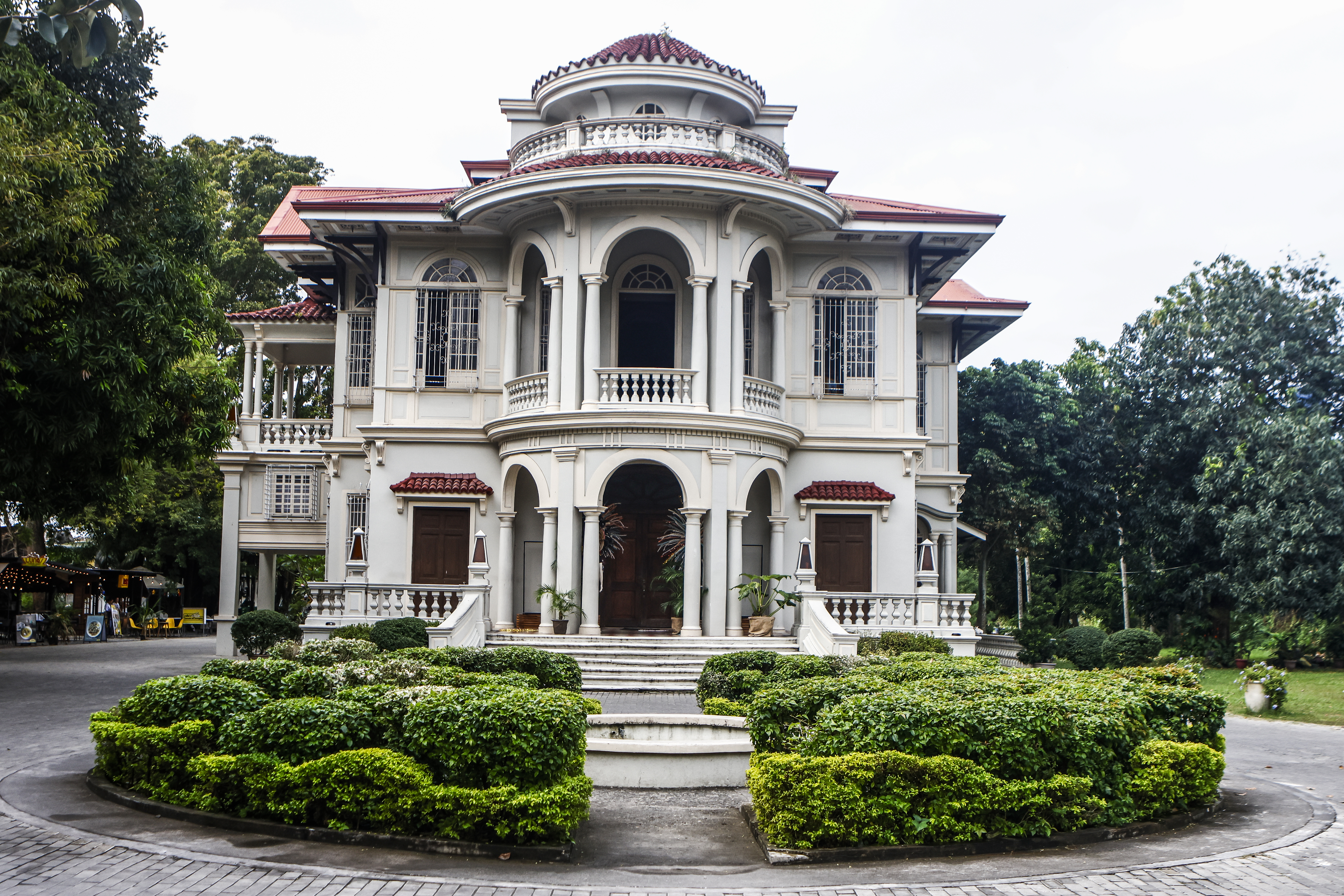
- Façade of the mansion
- Interactive map of the Molo Mansion area
- Former names: Lacson–Yusay Ancestral House
- Alternative names: Yusay–Consing Ancestral House

General information
- Architectural style: Neoclassical / Art Deco
- Location: Molo, Iloilo City, Philippines
- Coordinates: 10°41′47″N 122°32′36″E
- Completed: 1926
- Renovated: 2014
- Owner: SM Group

The Yusay-Consing Ancestral House, originally known as the Lacson-Yusay Ancestral House, and now popularly known as the Molo Mansion, is a neoclassical-art deco heritage house located in the district of Molo, Iloilo City, Philippines. It is located in front of the Molo Plaza and Molo Church. Built in 1926, it has neoclassical and subtle art deco features.

The property, including the mansion, is now owned by the SM Group, which now houses several souvenir shops that sell local products and delicacies, namely Kultura, Sabor Ilonggo, and Plantopia, as well as several coffee shops and restaurants.

== History ==
The mansion was built in 1926 by the couple Doña Petra Lacson, a matron of the Lacson clan, and Estanislao Yulo Yusay, a prominent lawyer and judge from Molo. They had ten children together. In 1940, Estanislao died, and Rosario Yusay, one of the couple's ten children, inherited the house. Rosario lived with her husband, Timoteo Consing Sr., who served as Iloilo governor from 1934 to 1937.

The property was handed down to the governor's son, Timoteo Consing Jr., and spouse, Nieva Ramirez-Consing, one of the owners of the sugar mill company Passi Sugar Central (acquired by the Universal Robina Corporation in 2007).

The Consing family sold the property to SM Group in 2014.

== Gallery ==
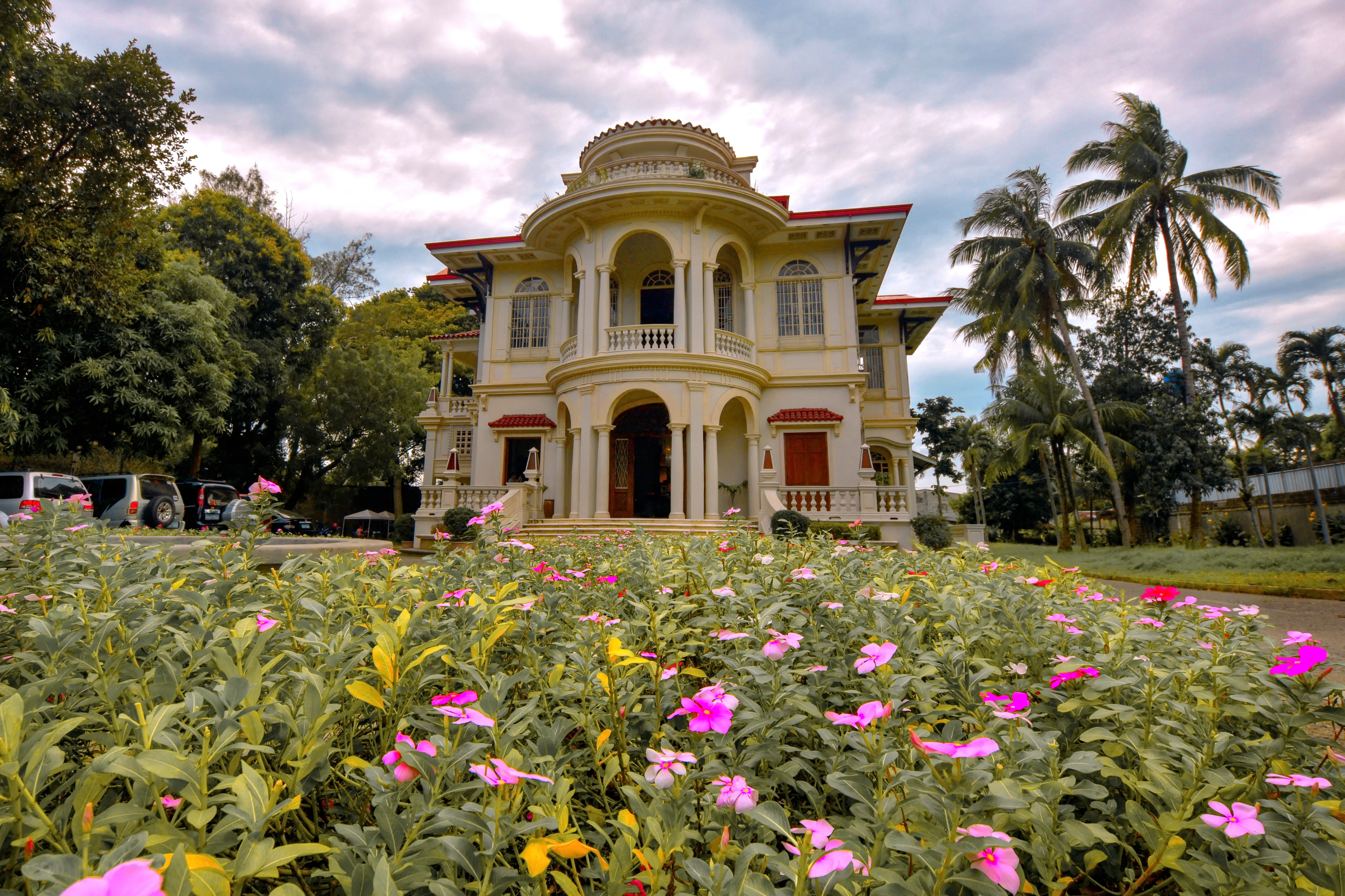
Façade of the Molo Mansion

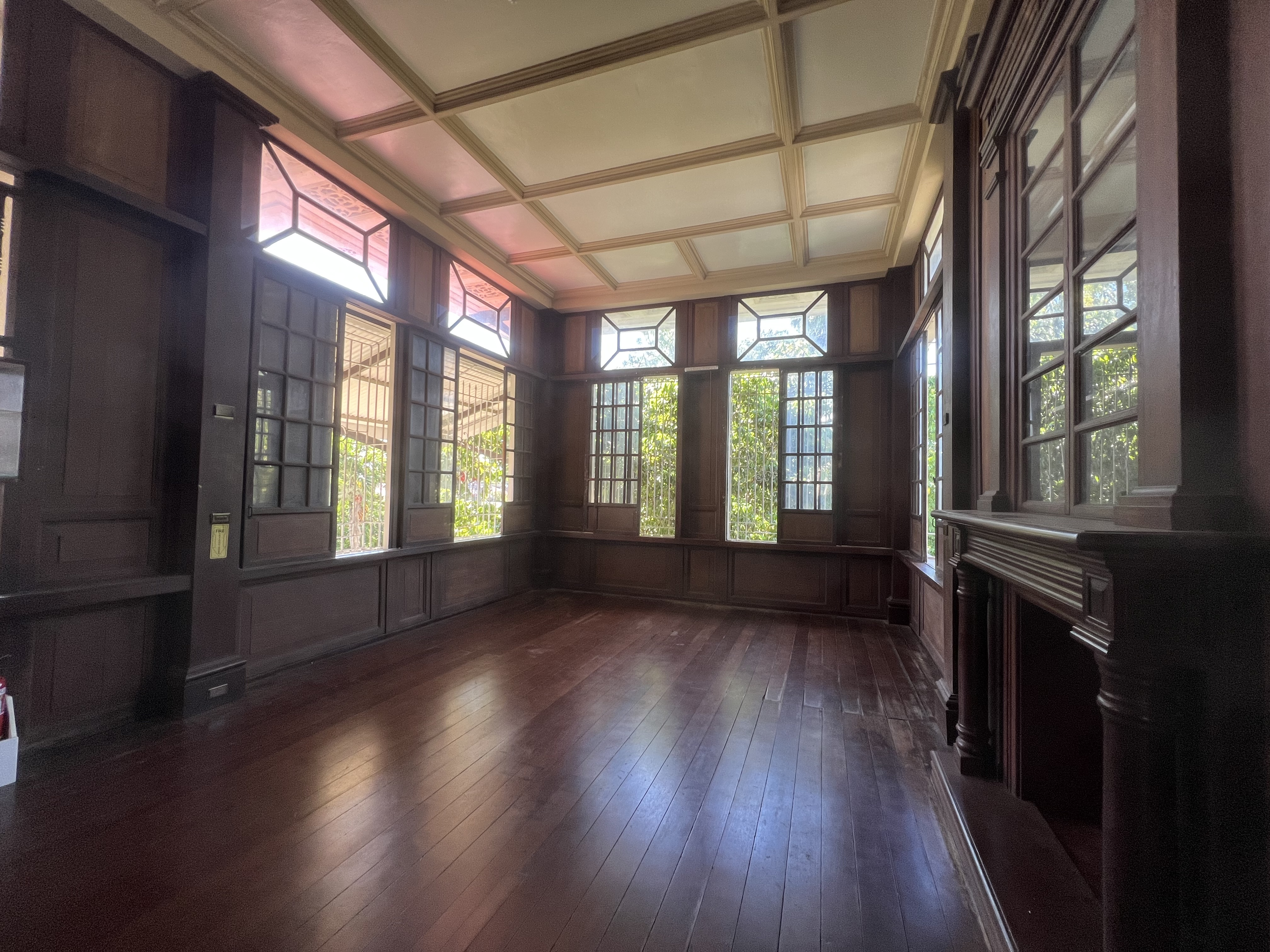
Second floor room

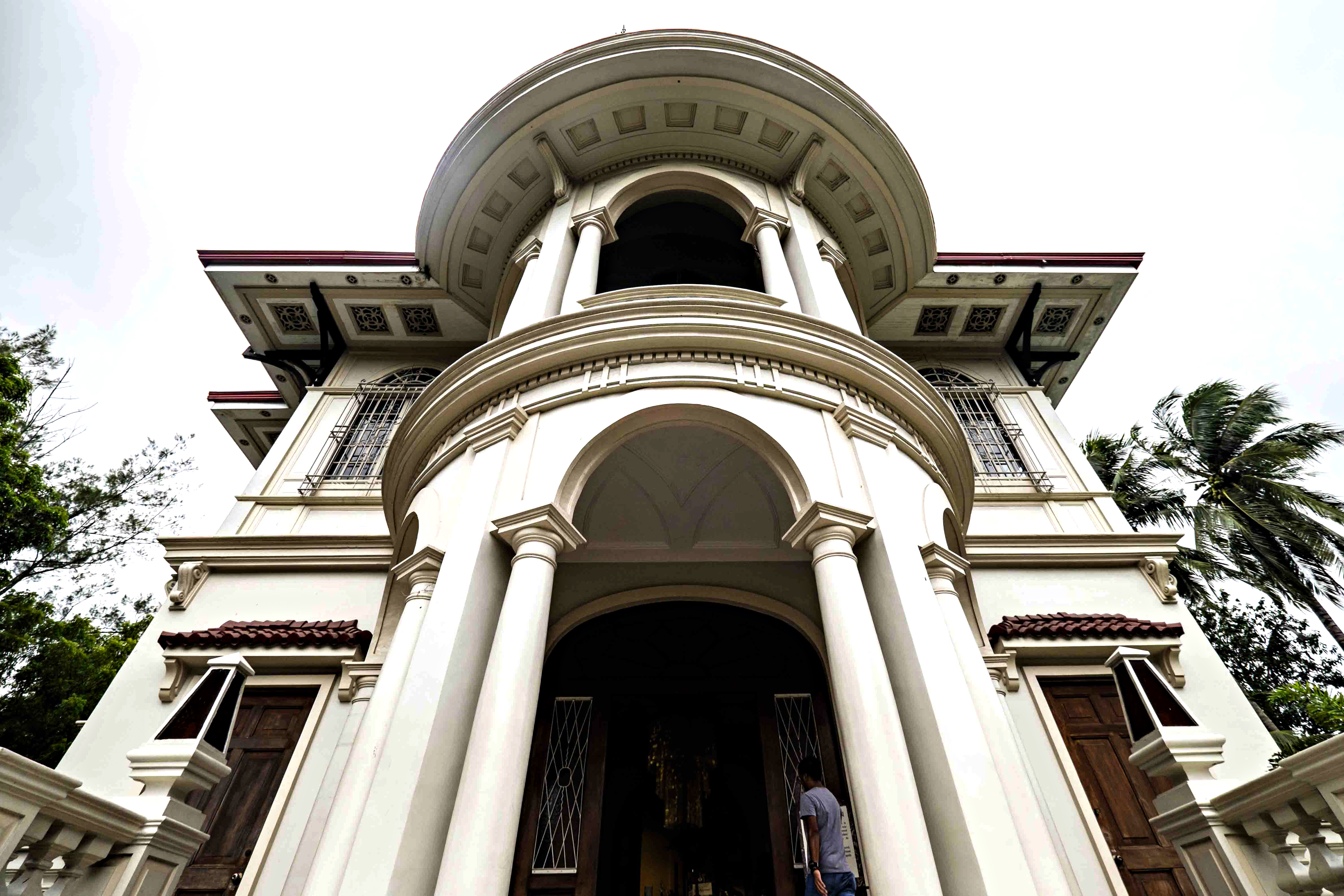
Lookup view of the mansion

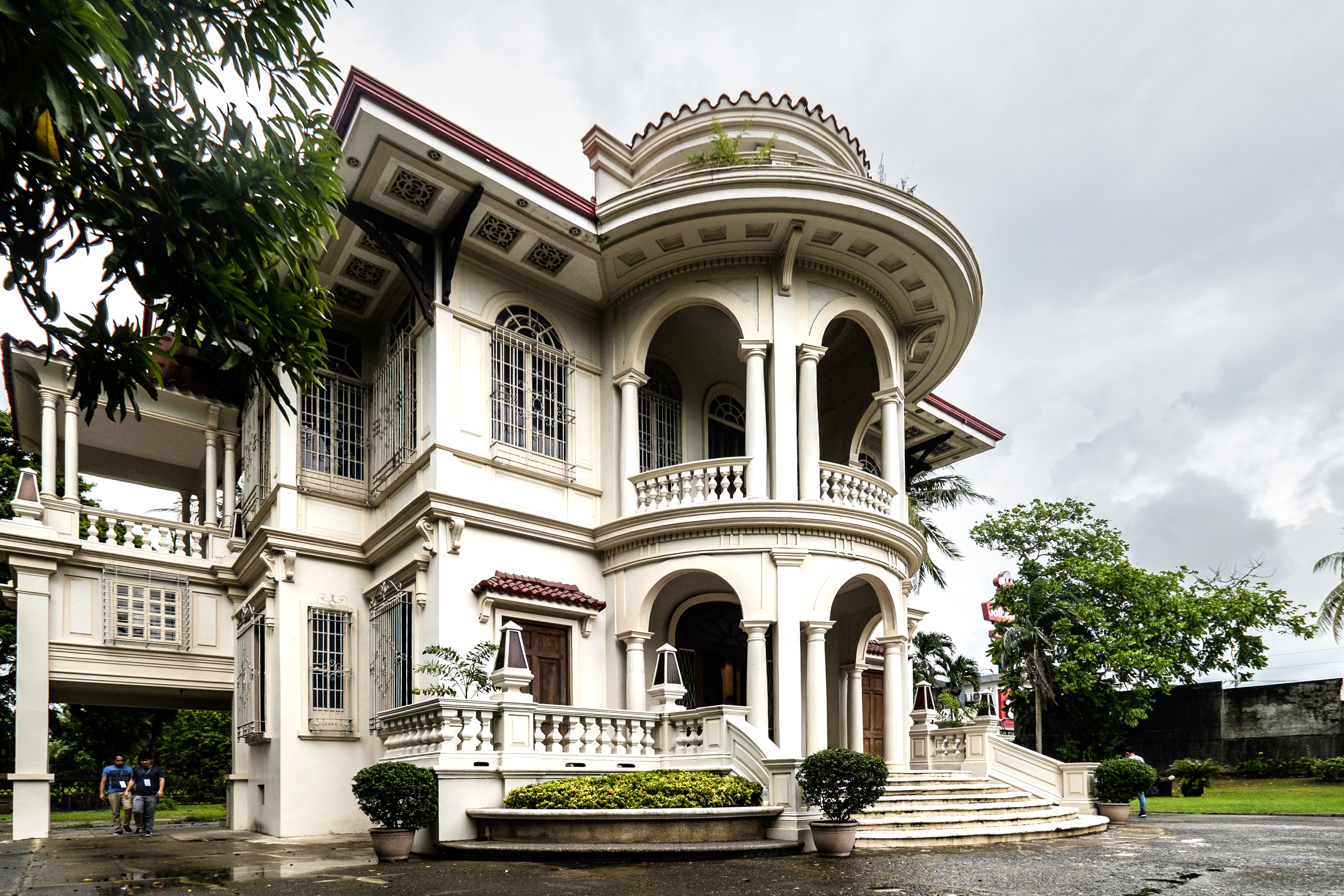
Front and left side view of the mansion

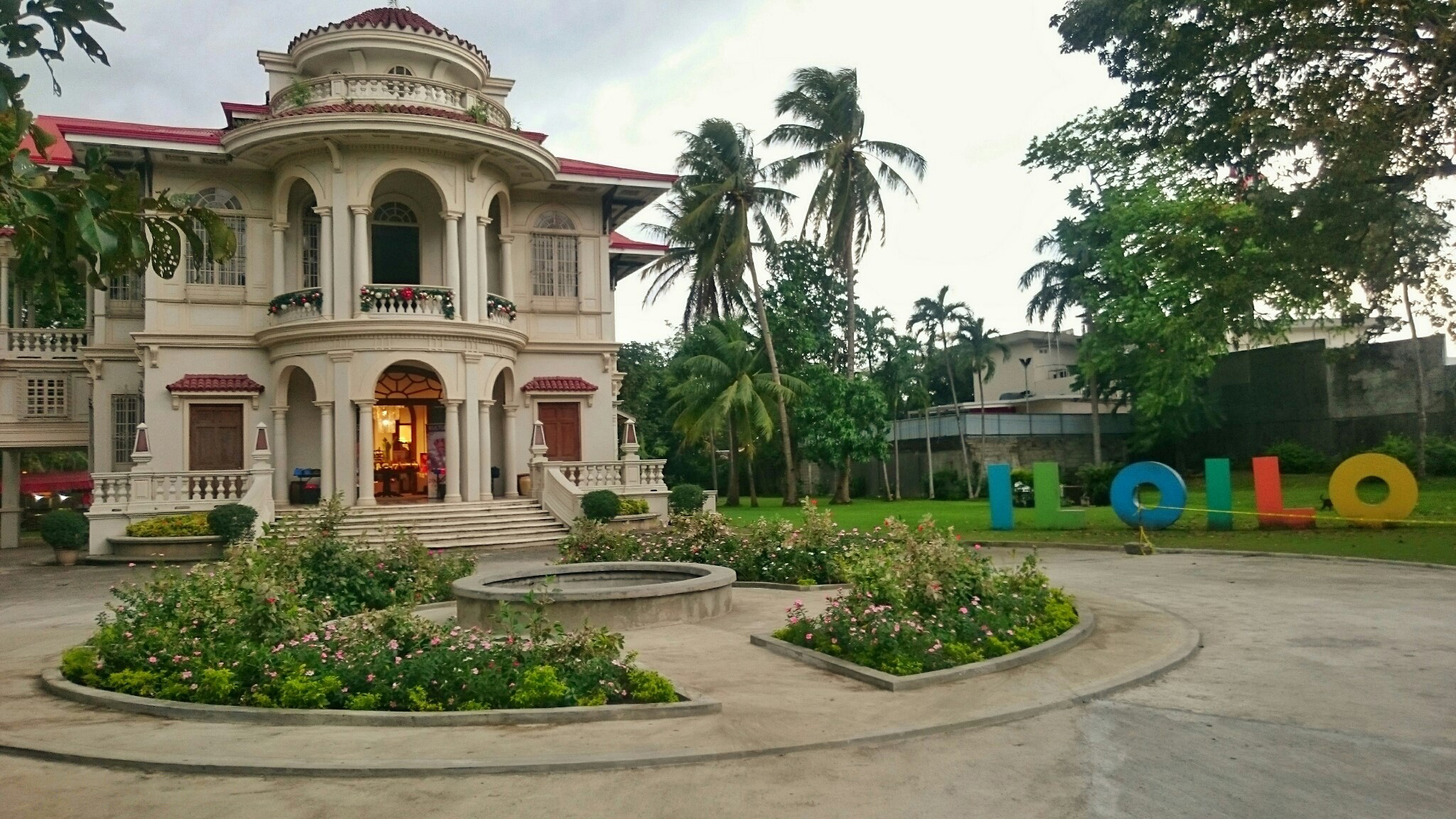
View from the entrance gate to the property

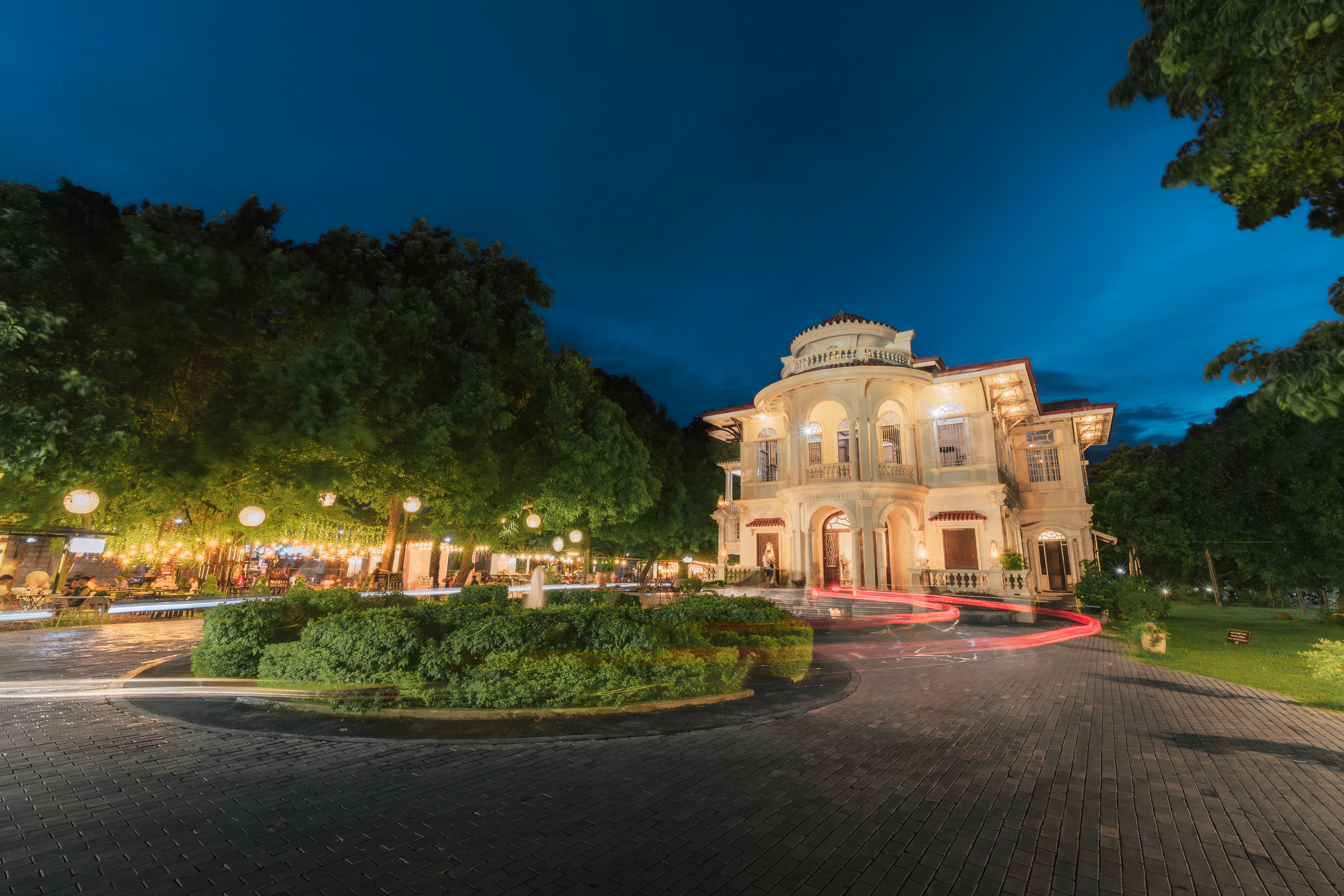
Molo mansion at Night

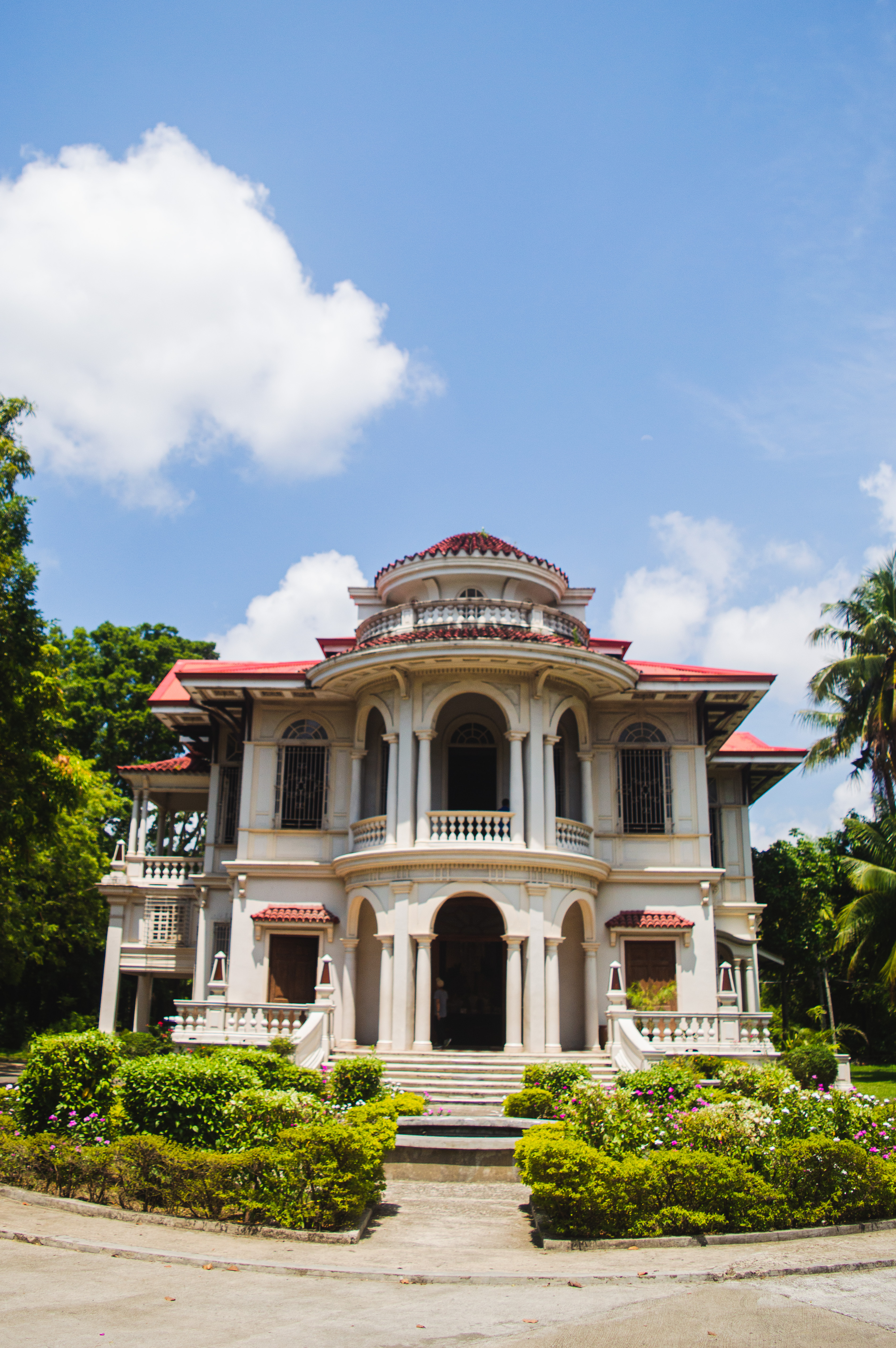

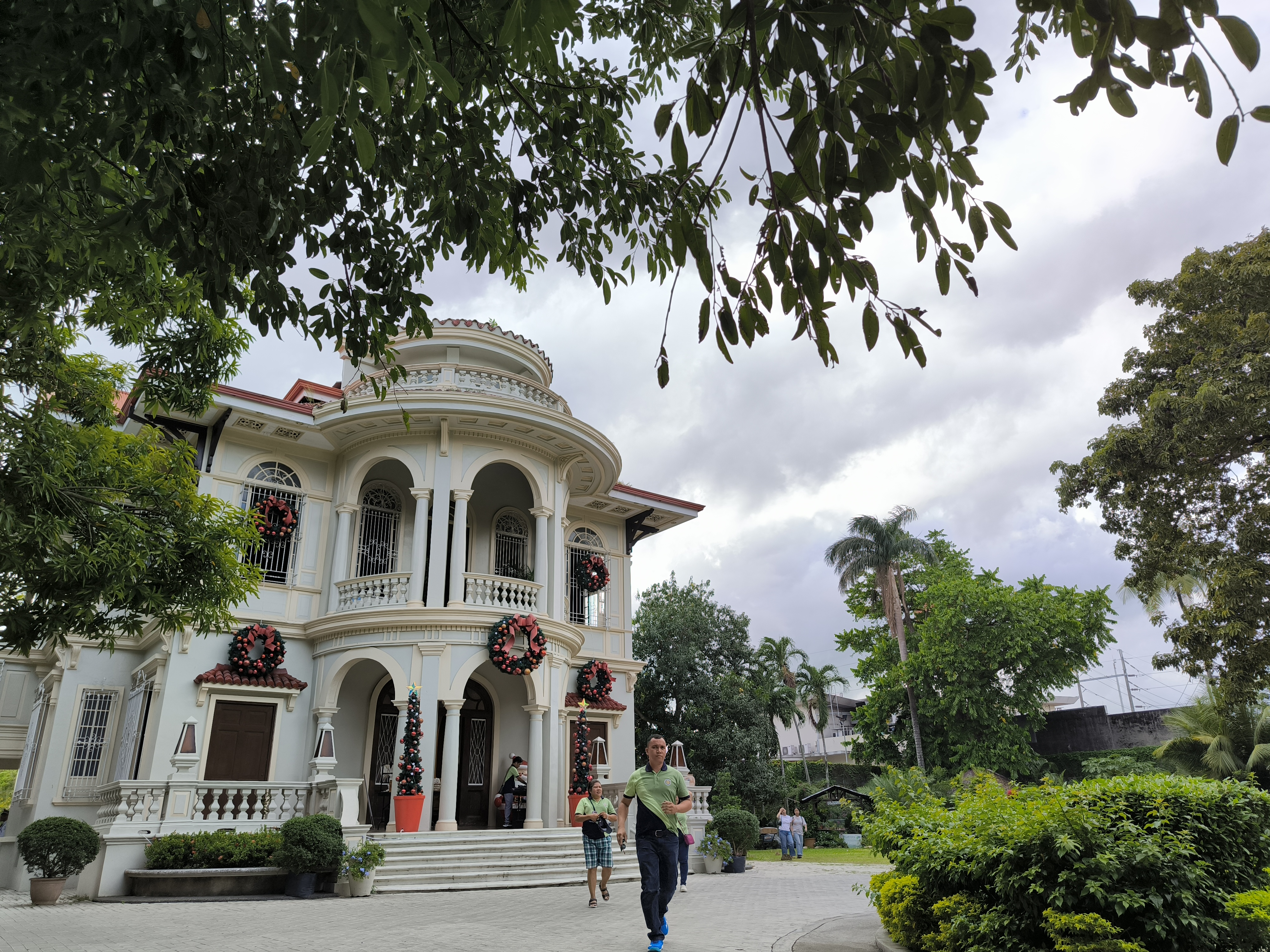

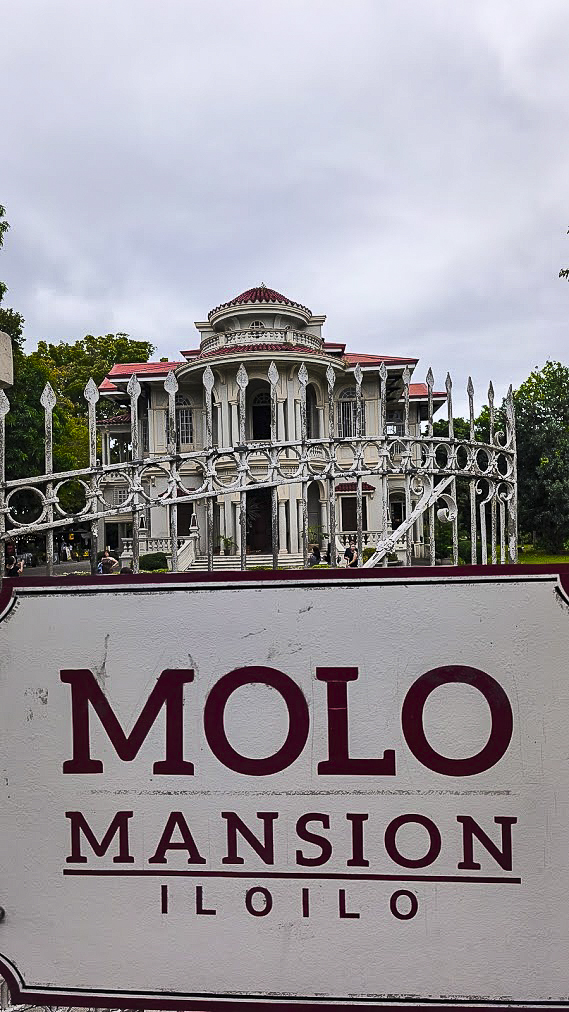

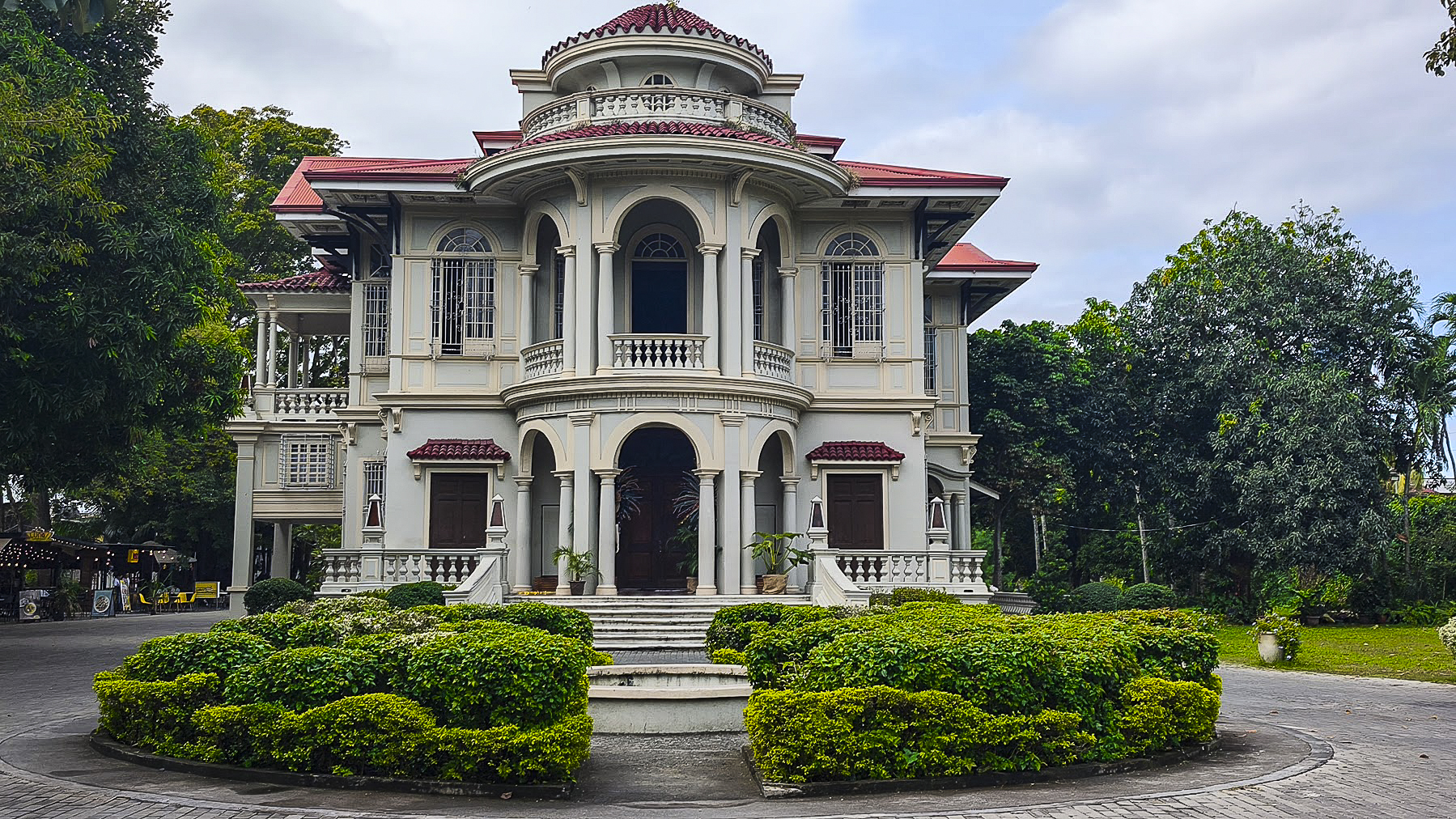

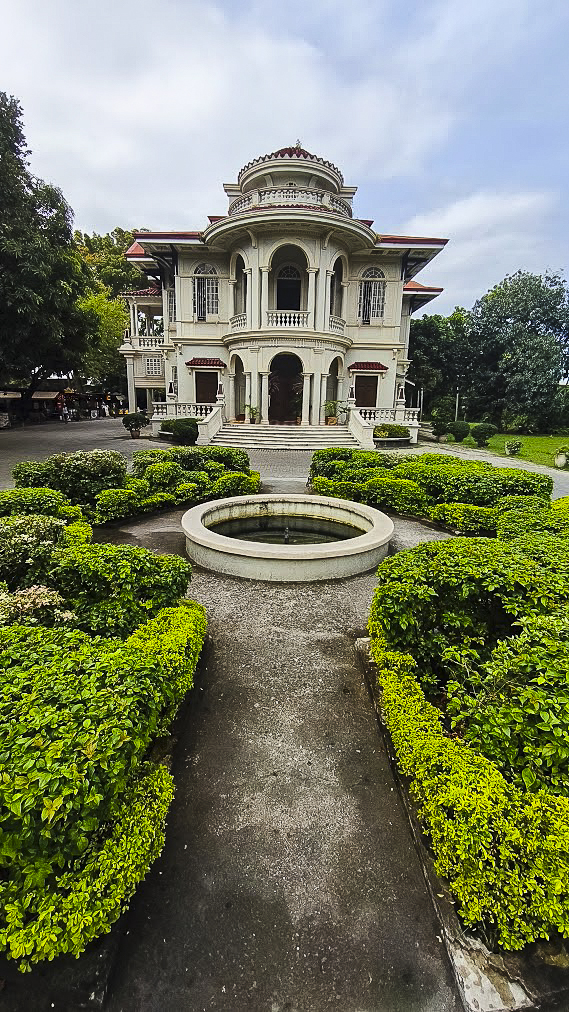

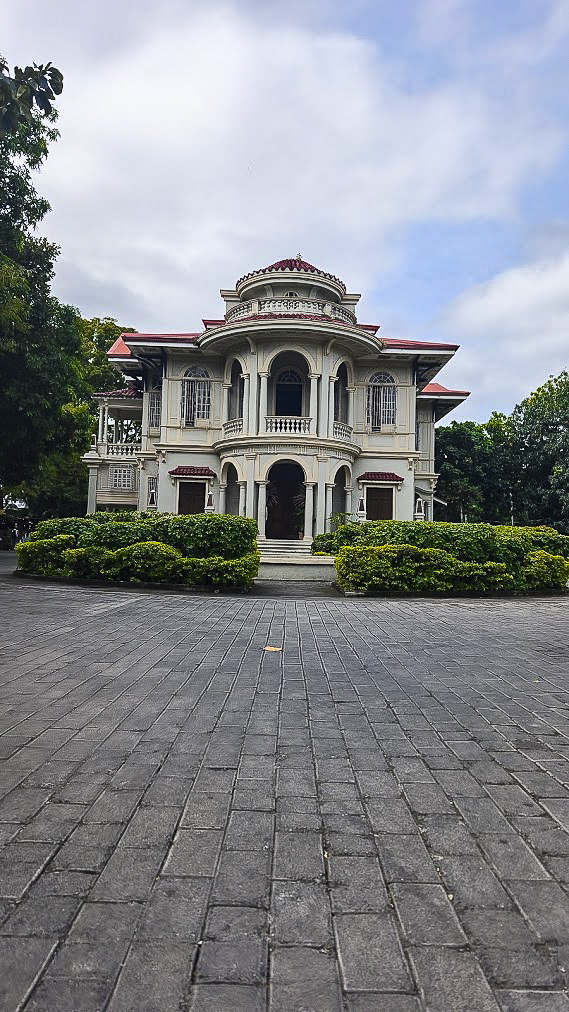

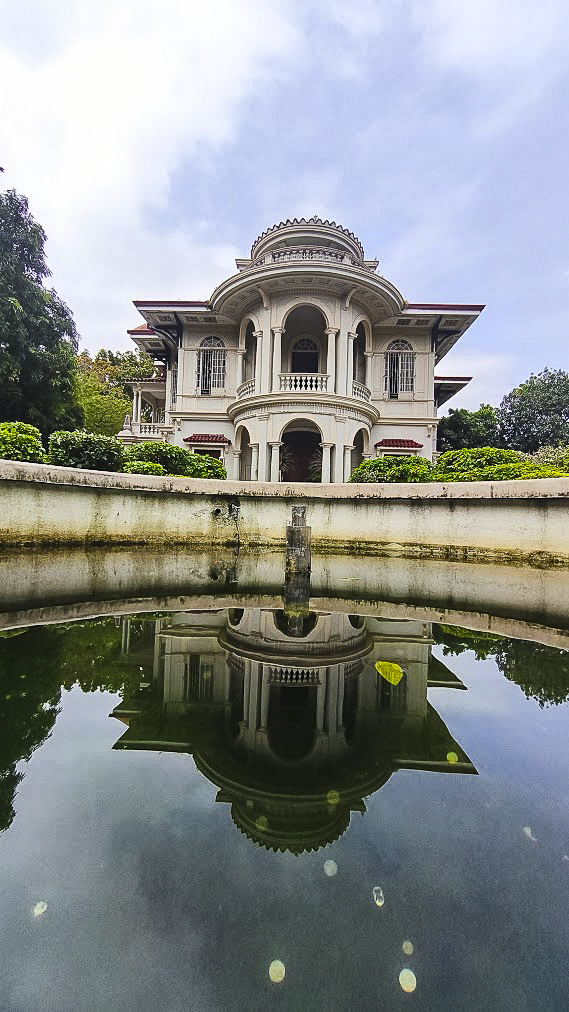

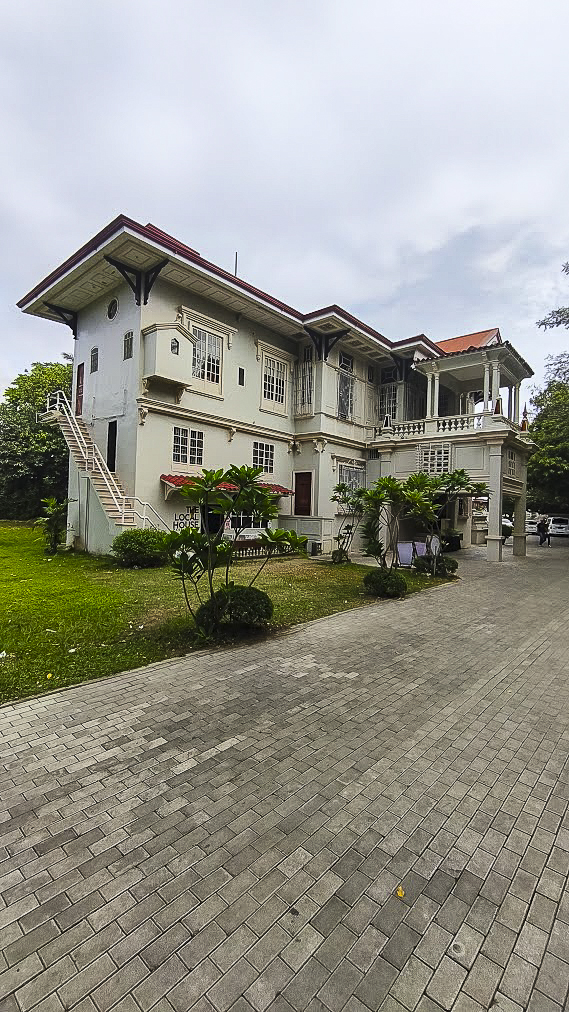

== See also ==
- The Lacson Ruins
- Cesar Lacson Locsin Ancestral House
- Lopez Heritage House
- Ledesma Mansion
- Lizares Mansion
- Ancestral Houses of the Philippines
