= Hiligaynon =

Hiligaynon may refer to:

- Hiligaynon people, also known as Ilonggo people, a subgroup of the Visayan ethnic group native to Panay, Guimaras, Negros and South-Central Mindanao. Not to be confused with the demonym Ilonggo which pertains to the permanent residents of Iloilo province and Iloilo City regardless of ethnicity.
- Hiligaynon language, also known as Ilonggo language, the language of the Hiligaynon people
- Hiligaynon literature, also known as Ilonggo literature
- Hiligaynon (magazine), a Philippine weekly magazine written in the eponymous language

== See also ==
- Iloilo City
- Iloilo (disambiguation)
