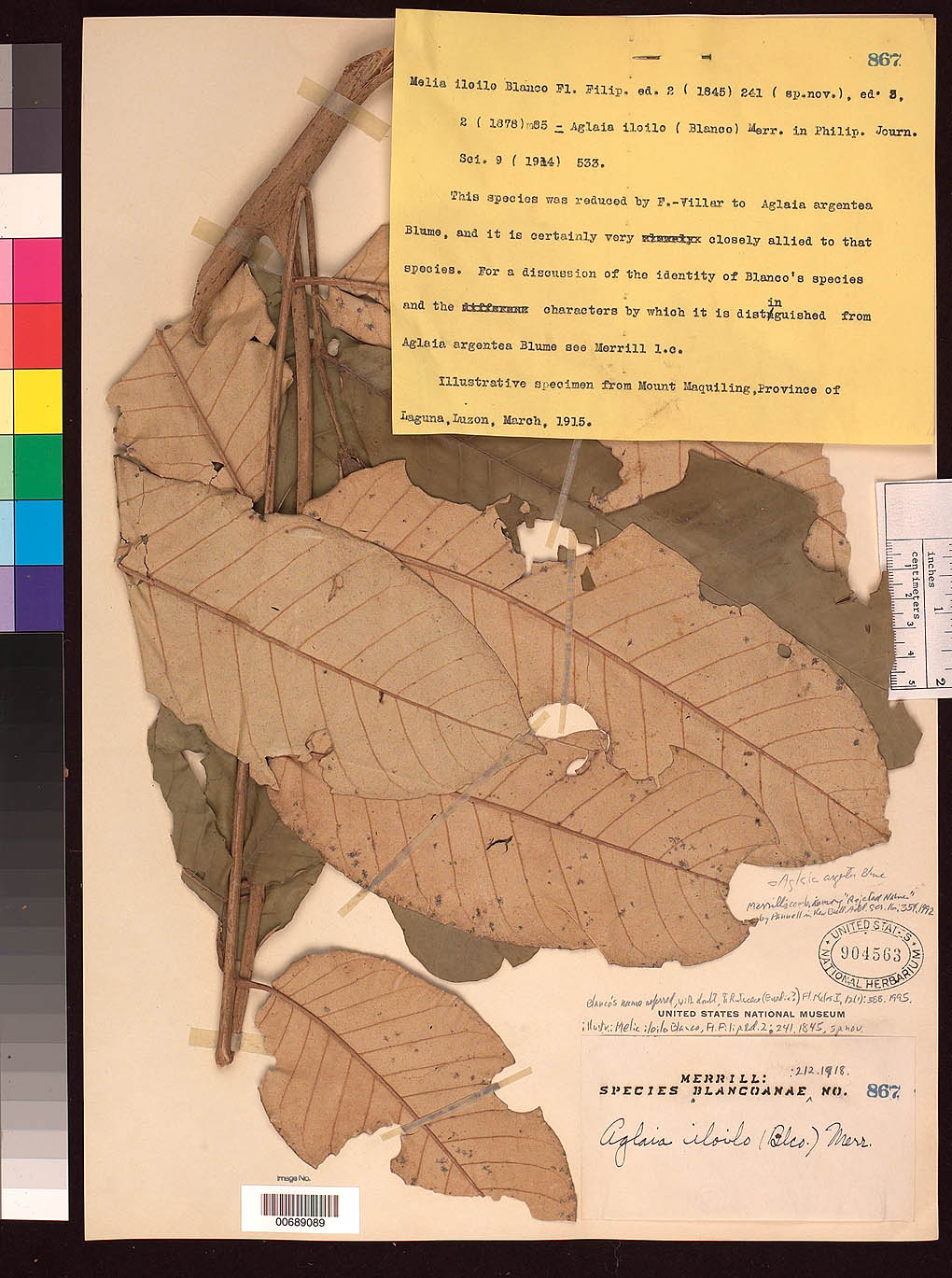
- Herbarium specimen

Conservation status
- Least Concern (IUCN 3.1)

Scientific classification
- Kingdom: Plantae
- Clade: Tracheophytes
- Clade: Angiosperms
- Clade: Eudicots
- Clade: Rosids
- Order: Sapindales
- Family: Meliaceae
- Genus: Aglaia
- Species: A. argentea

Binomial name
- Aglaia argentea Blume

Synonyms
- 19 synonyms: Aglaia argentea var. angustata Miq.; Aglaia argentea var. borneensis Miq.; Aglaia argentea var. cordulata C.DC.; Aglaia argentea var. curtisii King; Aglaia argentea var. hypoleuca (Miq.) Miq.; Aglaia argentea var. microphylla Miq.; Aglaia argentea var. multijuga Koord. & Valeton; Aglaia argentea var. splendens Koord. & Valeton; Aglaia argentea var. superba Miq.; Aglaia bauerlenii C.DC.; Aglaia discolor Merr.; Aglaia hypoleuca Miq.; Aglaia iloilo (Blanco) Merr.; Aglaia javanica Koord. & Valeton; Aglaia multifoliola Merr.; Aglaia speciosa Teijsm. & Binn.; Aglaia splendens (Koord. & Valeton) Koord. & Valeton; Melia iloilo Blanco; Milnea argentea Reinw. ex Blume

= Aglaia argentea =

Species of flowering plant

Aglaia argentea is a species of plants in the family Meliaceae. It is a tree found in Australia, Brunei, India, Indonesia, Malaysia, Myanmar, Papua New Guinea, the Philippines, the Solomon Islands, and Thailand.

== Description ==
Aglaia argentea is an evergreen tree up to 30 m (98 ft) tall, but may flower and fruit at about 4.5 m (15 ft). It has a spiral leaf arrangement and pinnately compound leaves with leaflets that are elliptical or oblong. The leaves typically range in size from 17 to 112 cm (6.7 to 44.1 in) long and 14 to 75 cm (5.5 to 29.5 in) wide. It is a dioecious species, meaning that male and female flowers are borne on separate plants. The flowers on both are similar, having 5 petals each. The male flowers have 5 stamens and the female flowers have superior ovaries. The fruit are about 30 to 35 mm (1.2 to 1.4 in) diameter, oval and fleshy, and contain one to three seeds. The flowers have a complex inflorescence that can grow up to 60 cm (24 in) long and wide, with radial symmetry.

== Taxonomy ==
It was first described in 1825 by German-Dutch botanist Carl Ludwig Blume in his book Bijdragen tot de flora van Nederlandsch Indië.

== Ecology ==
This species is found in well-developed rainforests and other humid lowland areas. It grows in wet tropical areas of east Asia, Australia, and some of the Pacific islands. It thrives on full sunlight and moderate amounts of water. It is also successful on many different soil types, such as: basalt, clay, coral sand, granite, limestone and sandstone. It is pollinated by insects and the seeds are commonly dispersed by birds that eat the fruit.

== Cultivation and Uses ==
The tree produces edible fruits that are often cultivated and eaten without the seeds in East Asia and some of the Pacific islands. The bark of the tree has steroids that were isolated to use as cytotoxins to help with some forms of cancer such as leukaemia. A. argentea is also known for a naturally occurring chemical called rocaglamide which contains properties that are useful as insecticides, antifungals, and antibacterial applications. In addition to the antibacterial properties, rocaglamide is also helpful with leukaemia much like the steroids mentioned before. Its timber is commonly used as a substitute for mahogany and it is also a great coloniser when regenerating forests and wildlife in areas where rainforests have been destroyed in the past.

== Common names ==
Common names include silver boodyara, bekak, or koping-koping. It is also locally known as iloilo in the Western Visayas in the Philippines, named after the city of Iloilo (and the Iloilo province) where the tree is commonly found.

== Gallery ==
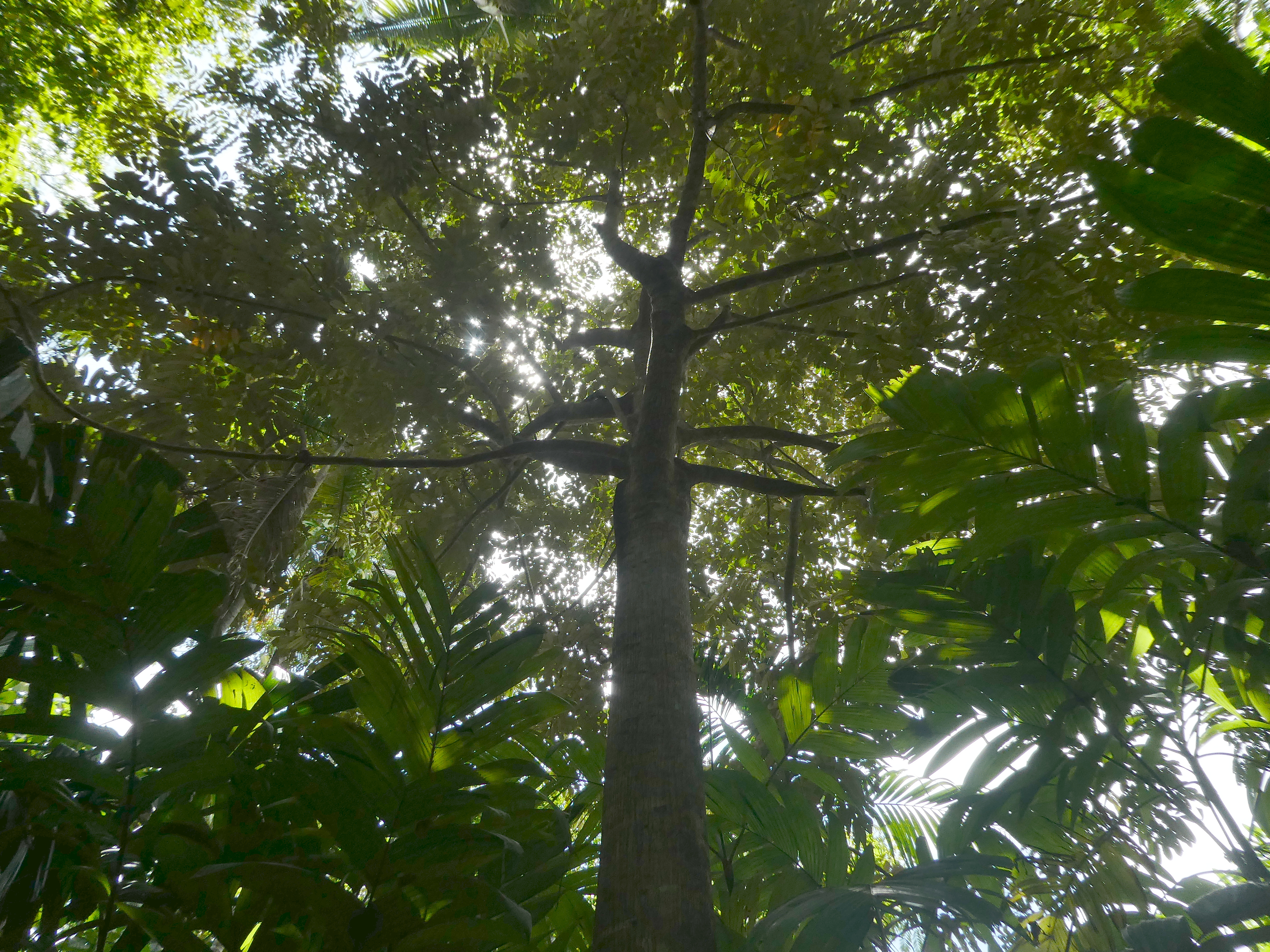
Habit

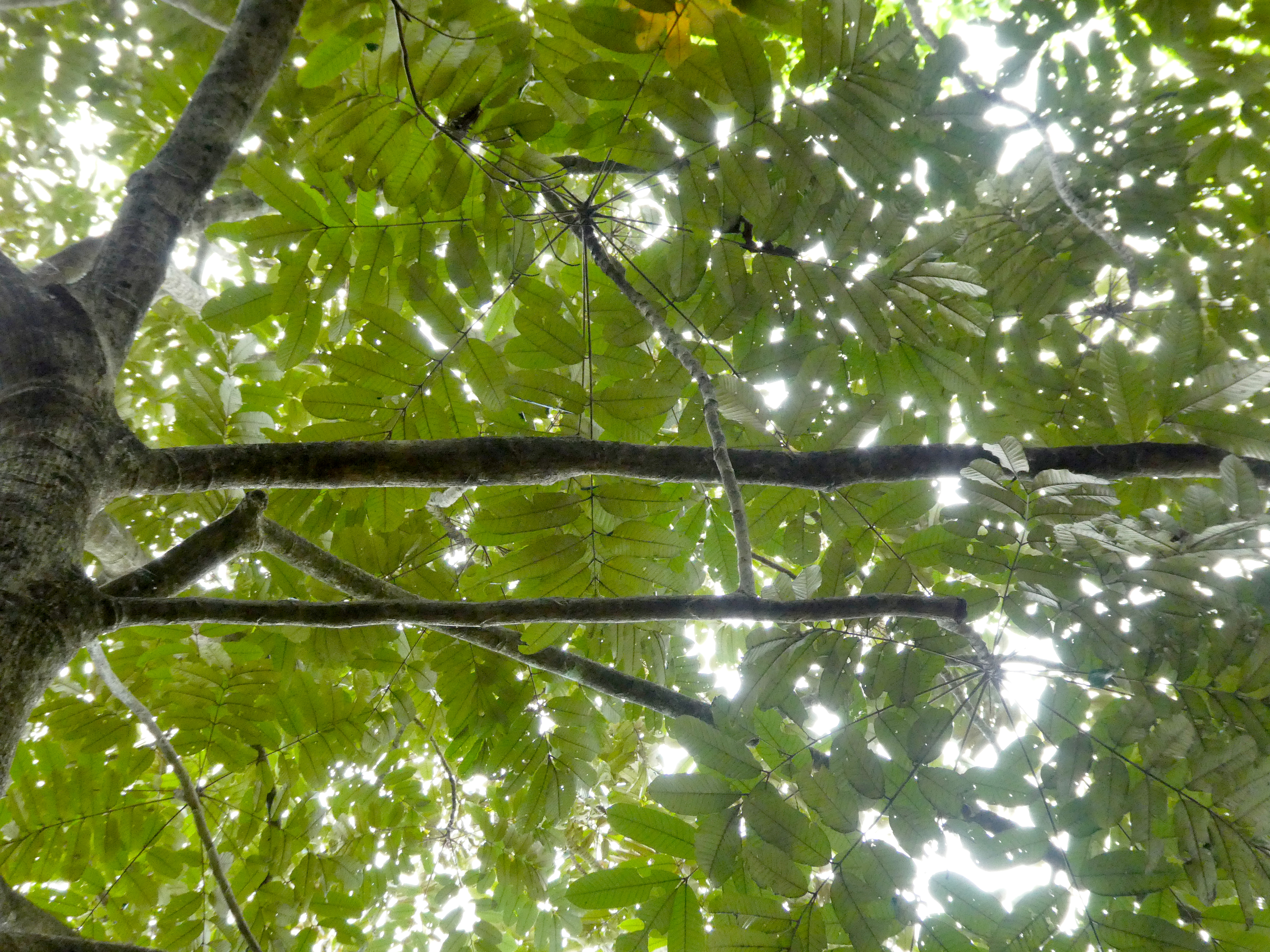
Foliage

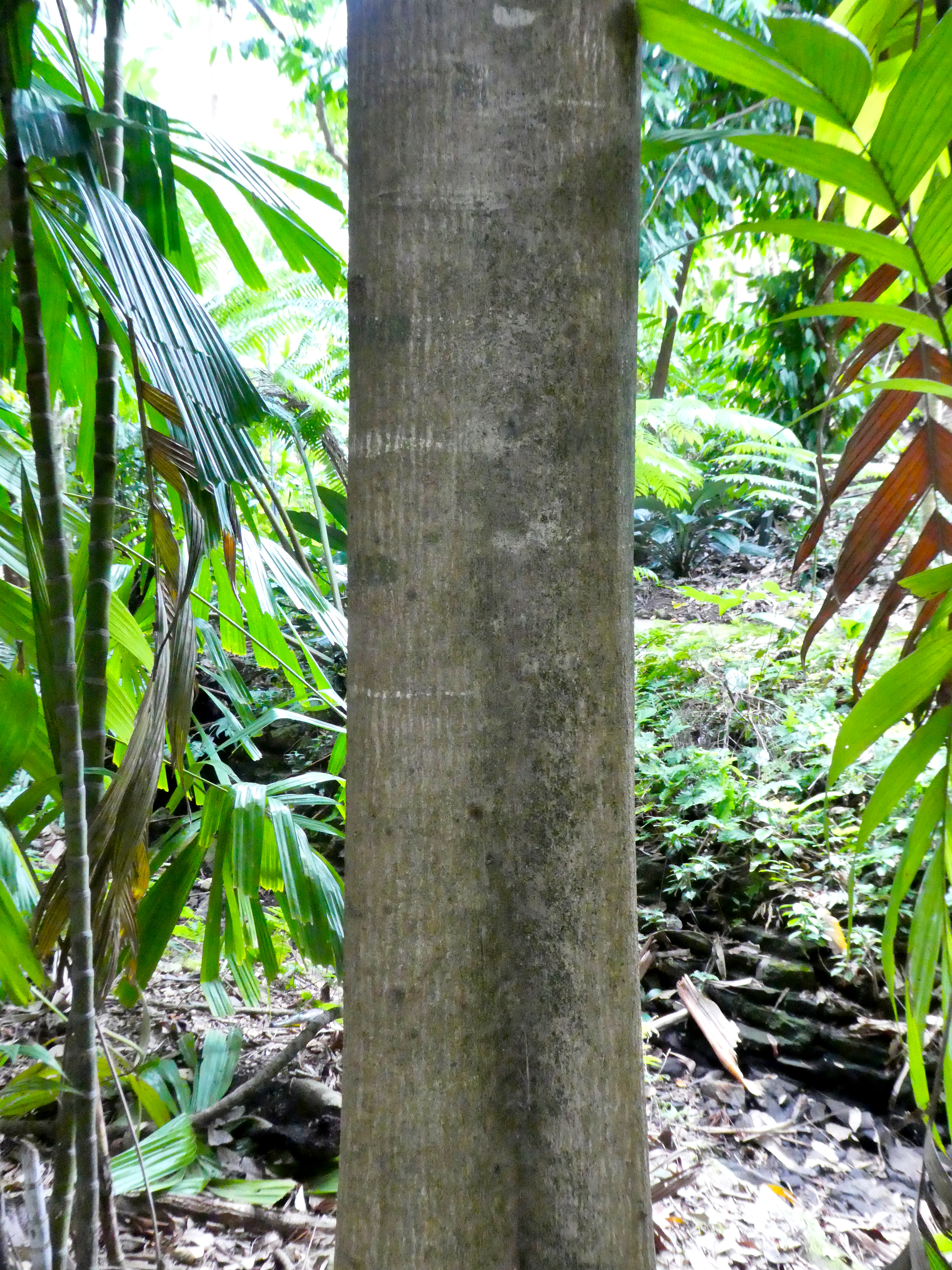
Trunk

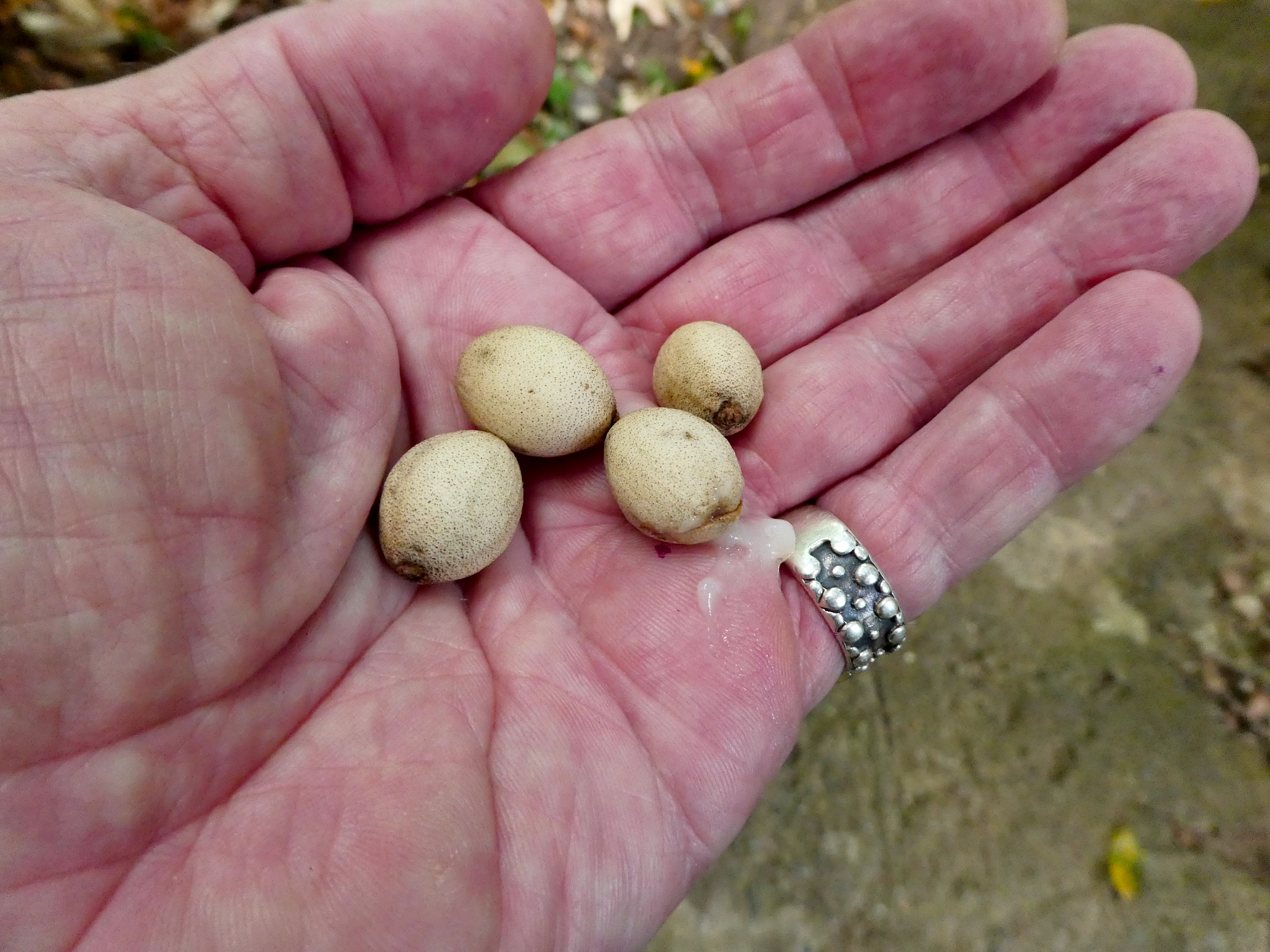
Fruit
