= Iloilo City National High School =

Public high school in Iloilo City, Philippines

Location
- M.H. del Pilar Street, Molo, Iloilo City; Philippines
- Coordinates: 10°41′52″N 122°32′59″E

Information
- Type: Public High School
- Established: 1941
- Grades: Junior High School - 7 to 10; Senior High School - 11 to 12
- Campus type: Urban

The Iloilo City National High School, also known as City High, is a public junior and senior high school in Molo, Iloilo City, Philippines. It was established in 1941 by Oscar Ledesma, then mayor of Iloilo City.

== History ==
The Iloilo City National High School was established in 1941 to address the growing educational demands of Iloilo City's populace. Through the initiative of then-Mayor Oscar Ledesma, the school was opened on its current site along M.H. del Pilar Street, Molo, Iloilo City.

The school commenced operations with 18 first-year sections under the leadership of its first principal, Mr. Vicente Cornelio, and 28 pioneering teachers. Together, they laid the foundation for the school's academic excellence. However, the institution's early years were disrupted by the outbreak of World War II in December 1941. During the war, the Japanese forces occupied the school's buildings, which were later destroyed.

In April 1945, refresher courses were offered at the Iloilo School of Arts and Trades in La Paz, Iloilo City, as temporary accommodation. Due to the increasing number of students, the City Hall, now part of the University of the Philippines Visayas, was used as classrooms until temporary structures were completed. By October 1945, the school returned to its original site in Molo.

The school's facilities steadily improved over the years. Government support and contributions from stakeholders such as Congressman Fermin Caram Jr. and the Parent-Teacher Association (PTA) addressed the increasing need for classroom space. Several buildings, including Marcos-type prefabricated structures and a permanent 10-room building funded by the PTA, were constructed to accommodate more students.

In 1983, a significant milestone was achieved when the school was elevated to national status through Batas Pambansa Blg. 499, officially becoming Iloilo City National High School.
