= Molo, Iloilo City =

District of Iloilo City, Philippines

Molo
- District of Iloilo City
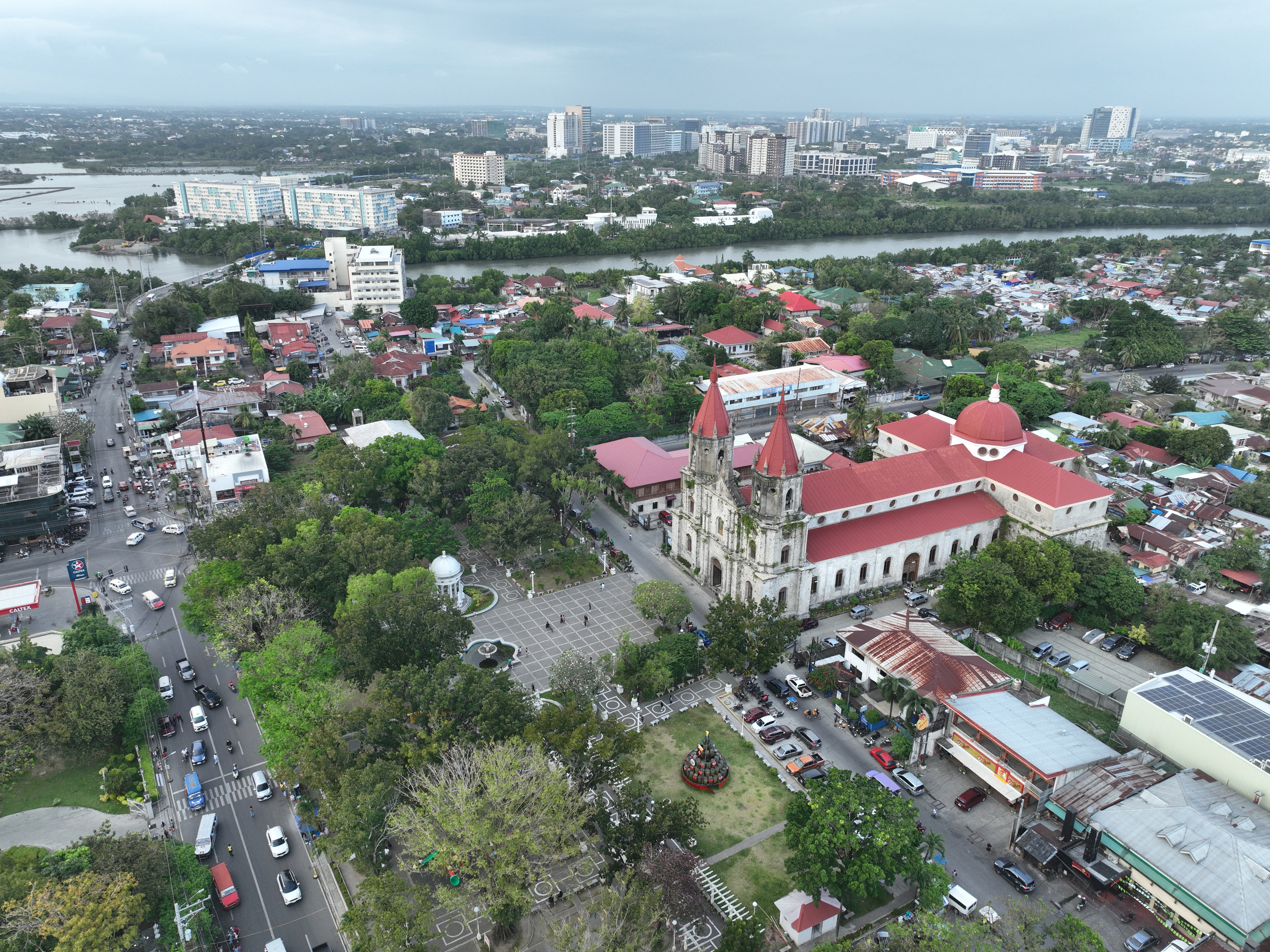
- Aerial view of Molo Plaza area
- Nickname: Athens of the Philippines
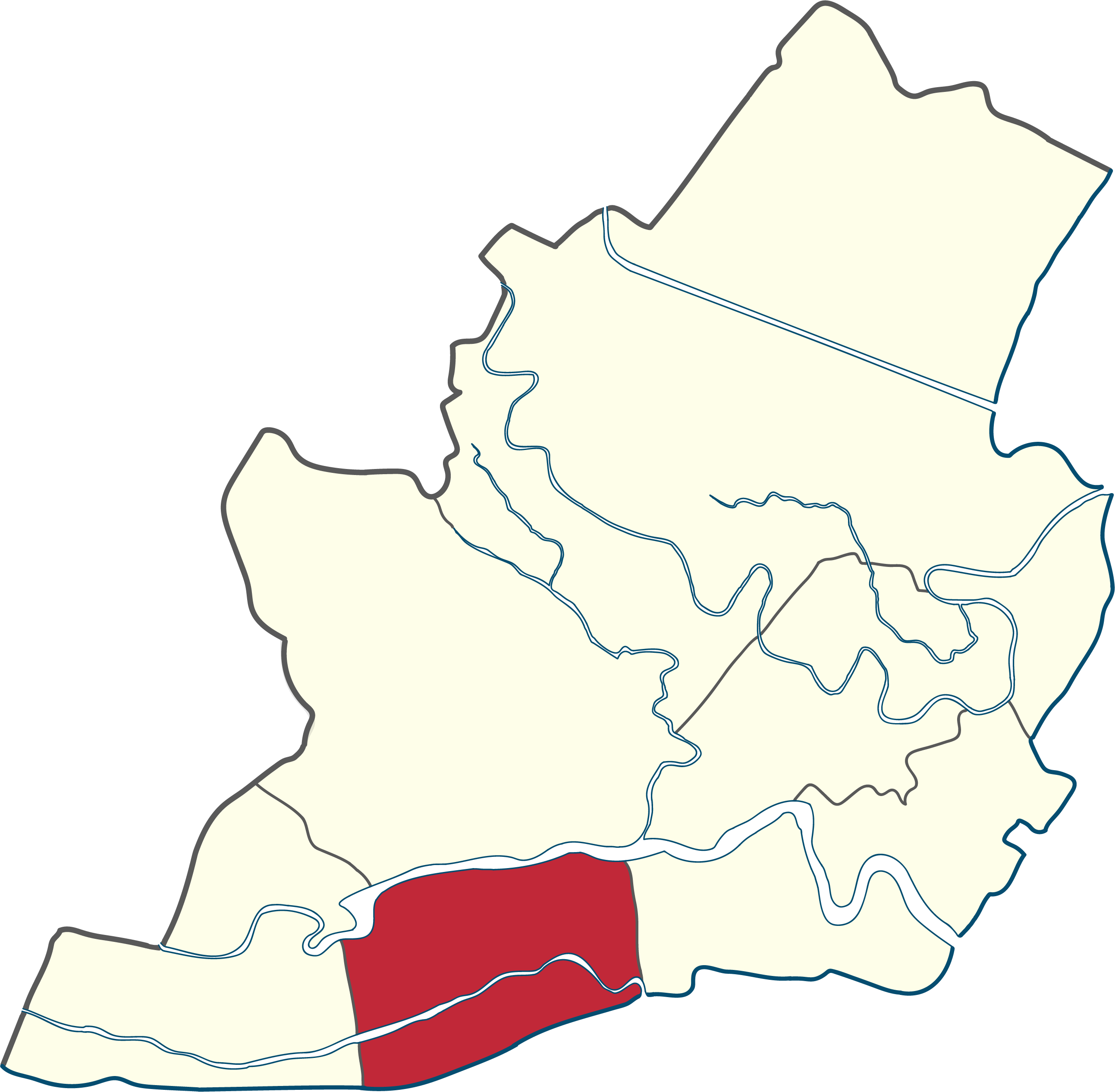
- Location within Iloilo City
- Interactive map of Molo
- Location in the Philippines Molo (Philippines)
- Coordinates: 10°41′29″N 122°32′32″E
- Country: Philippines
- Region: Western Visayas (Region VI)
- Province: Iloilo (geographically only)
- City: Iloilo City
- Congressional District: Lone district of Iloilo City
- Established: 1637
- Merged into city: August 25, 1937
- Barangays: 25 (see Barangays)

Government
  - District ABC President: Lee Quimsing

Area
  - Total: 5.54 km^{2} (2.14 sq mi)

Population (2024 census)
  - Total: 76,793
  - Density: 13,900/km^{2} (35,900/sq mi)
- Demonym: Moleño
- Time zone: UTC+8 (PST)
- ZIP code: 5000
- Area code: 33
- Native languages: Hiligaynon
- Patron saint: Saint Anne
- Feast day: July 26

Molo ([ˈmolo]) is a district in Iloilo City, Philippines. It is the most densely populated district in the city. According to the 2024 census, Molo has a population of 76,793 people, making it the second-most populous district, after Jaro.

Molo is often referred to as the "Athens of the Philippines" due to its association with influential Filipino intellectuals and political leaders. Many renowned Philippine Ilustrados, philosophers, and political figures were born in Molo. The district has produced numerous chief justices, senators, governors, generals, congressmen, and cabinet officials throughout history. It was also known as Parián or Chinatown of Iloilo, where the Chinese residents of the city resided.

Molo is home to Molo Church, a popular centuries-old church located in front of the Molo Plaza. The church is a notable landmark and holds cultural and religious significance. Molo is also known for its local dish, Pancit Molo, a popular pork dumpling soup named after the district where it originated.

== Etymology ==
The name "Molo" came from the word "moro", the name of the Islamic group called Moro that frequently raided the town. The town's population had a predominance of Chinese, who had difficulty pronouncing the "r" and kept pronouncing molo instead of moro.

== History ==
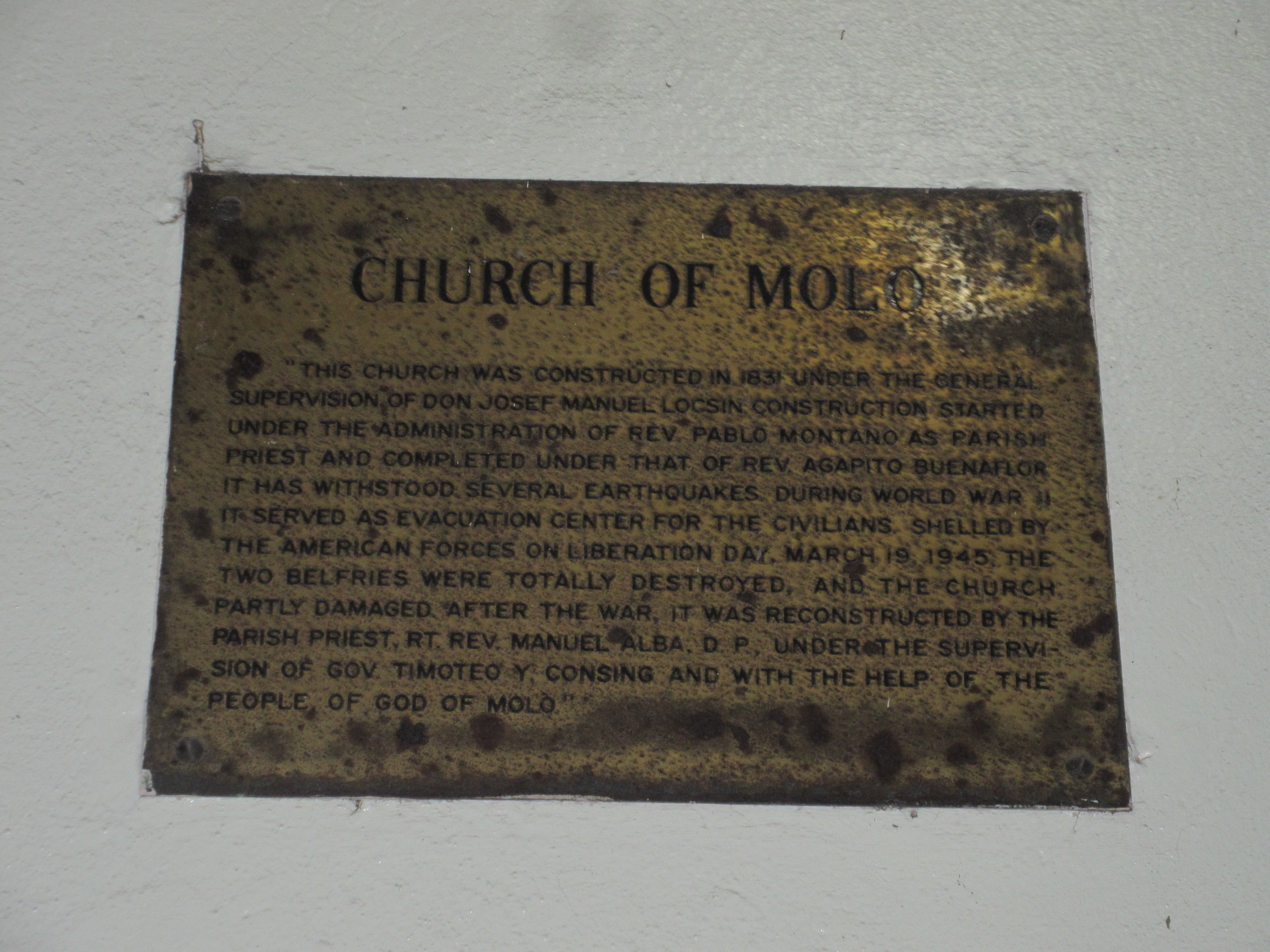
Molo Church inscription

Molo was founded as a Chinese district or Chinatown in 1637. Chinese traders supplied the colonists settled in the area, as Molo serviced the nearby Villa de Arevalo which was full of Mexicans and Spaniards, who needed the Chinese in Molo for their services in trade and it was formally recognized by the Spaniards as Parián. During the 1800s, Molo became a center of learning in the Visayas and earned the sobriquet "Athens of the Philippines". Despite being primarily a Chinatown for Chinese-Filipinos Molo also had 23 Spanish-Filipino families.

On August 4, 1896, the Philippines' national hero, José Rizal, visited Molo on his way to Manila from exile in Dapitan in Zamboanga del Norte. He exclaimed, "La iglesia bonita!" as he saw the Molo Church, acknowledging its beauty.

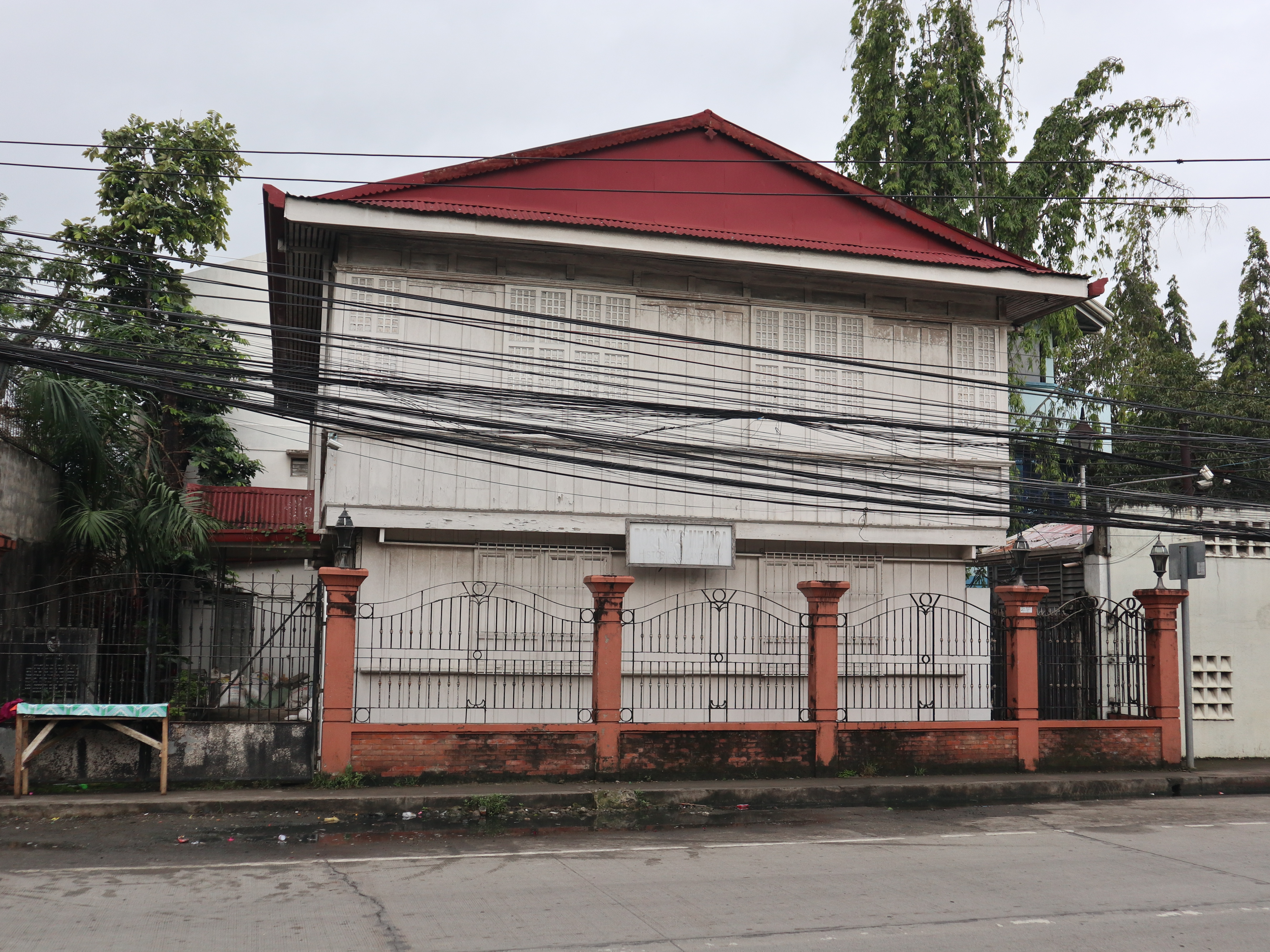
Rosendo Mejica Ancestral House

In March 1898, a committee from Molo called the "Conspirators’ Committee" or Comite Conspirador planned an upcoming uprising against the Spaniards. The group would later launch the revolution in the whole of Panay in August 1898 and organize a temporary revolutionary government, later known as the Provisional Government of the District of Visayas.

On July 16, 1937, Molo was legally annexed into Iloilo City as a district, which was formally inaugurated on August 25, 1937, alongside the towns of Arevalo, La Paz, and Mandurriao, through Act No. 719 of 1903.

== Geography ==
Molo is the third-smallest district in Iloilo City, with an area of 5.54 square kilometres (2.14 sq mi). It is 3.21 kilometres (1.99 mi) away from Iloilo City Proper. Molo shares borders with Arevalo to the west, Mandurriao to the north, La Paz to the northeast, and City Proper to the east. The district is the location of the mouth of the Batiano River, which then empties into the Iloilo Strait in the southeast part of the district.

=== Barangays ===
The district of Molo has a total of 25 barangays.

- Calumpang
- Cochero
- Compania
- East Baluarte
- East Timawa
- Habog-Habog Salvacion
- Infante
- Kasingkasing
- Katilingban
- Molo Boulevard
- North Avanceña
- North Baluarte
- North Fundidor
- North San Jose
- Poblacion
- San Antonio
- San Juan
- San Pedro
- South Baluarte
- South Fundidor
- South San Jose
- Taal
- Tap-oc
- West Habog-Habog
- West Timawa

== Economy ==
The district of Molo is one of the major commercial areas in Iloilo City. The Department of Social Welfare and Development (DSWD) and Bureau of Internal Revenue (BIR) are among the government agencies with regional offices in Molo.

== Culture and landmarks ==
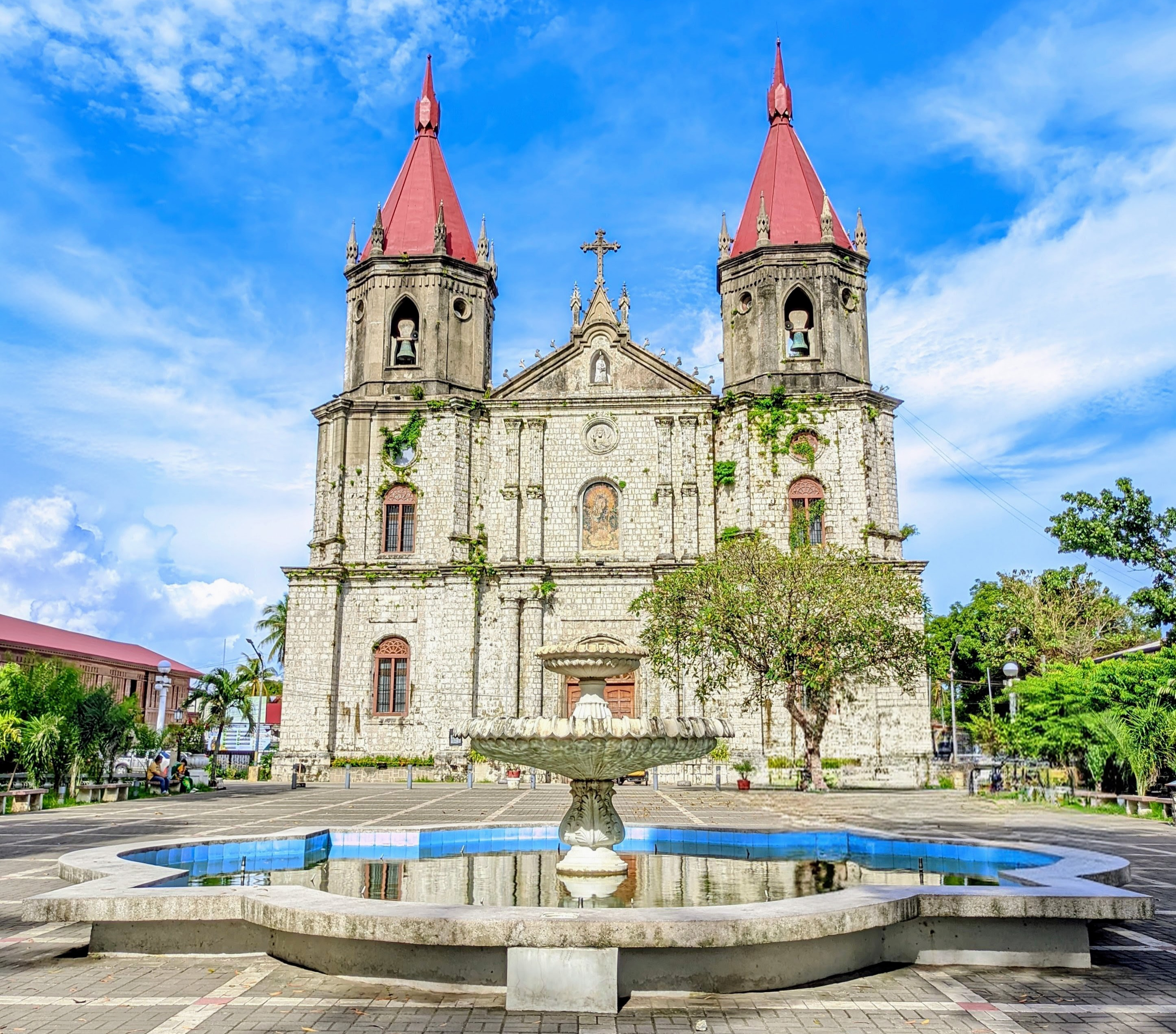
Molo Church and the Plaza

=== Molo Church ===
The notable Spanish-colonial church and heritage site in the district. It stands in front of Molo Plaza, with prominent red spires that crown its tall bell towers. Molo Church is also known as "the feminist church" because of the all-women's ensemble of saints represented in 16 statues perched on the aisle pillars. The church was declared a national landmark by the National Historical Institute in 1992 through the representation of Sir Knight Rex S. Salvilla. It is the only Gothic church in the country outside of Manila.

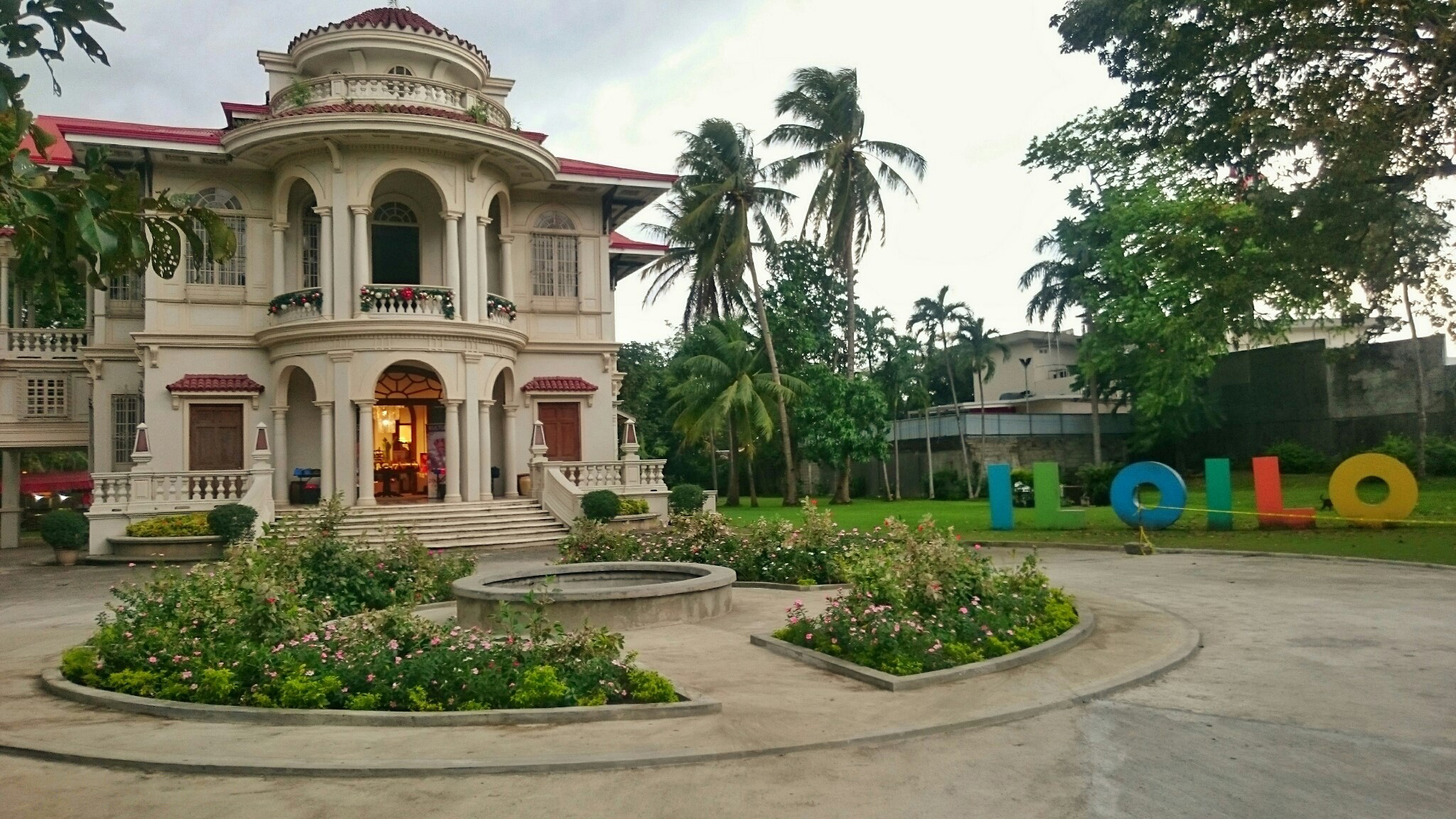
Molo Mansion, otherwise known as Yusay-Consing Mansion, on Locsin Street

=== Molo Mansion ===
The Yusay–Consing Ancestral House, more popularly known as Molo Mansion, stands across the Molo Plaza and Molo Church. Its features are its high ceilings, Neoclassical balustrades, and decorative carvings.

=== Molo Plaza ===
One of the seven district plazas in Iloilo City. Molo Plaza is considered the most beautiful public plaza in the city. The plaza features statues of Greek goddesses and the monument of Maria Clara. A fountain was also installed to break the monotony of the artworks during the rehabilitation in August 2022.

=== Molo Fiesta ===
The annual celebration of the feast of Saint Anne, the patron saint of the district, is celebrated every July 26.

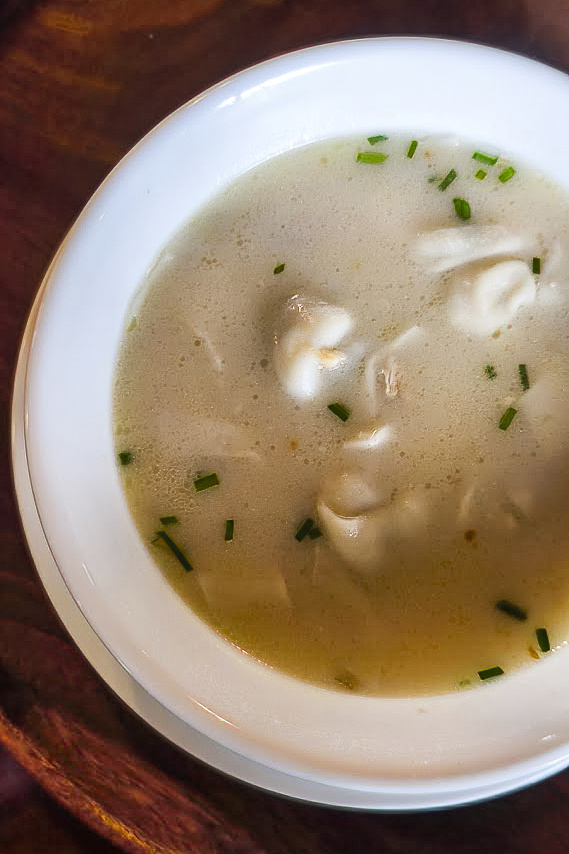
A bowl of Pancit Molo

=== Pancit Molo ===
Pancit Molo is a pork dumpling soup. It is a type of soup made with wonton wrappers. It consists of a mixture of ground pork wrapped in molo or wonton wrapper, shredded chicken meat, and also shrimp. Pancit Molo originated in Molo, hence the name.

== Education ==
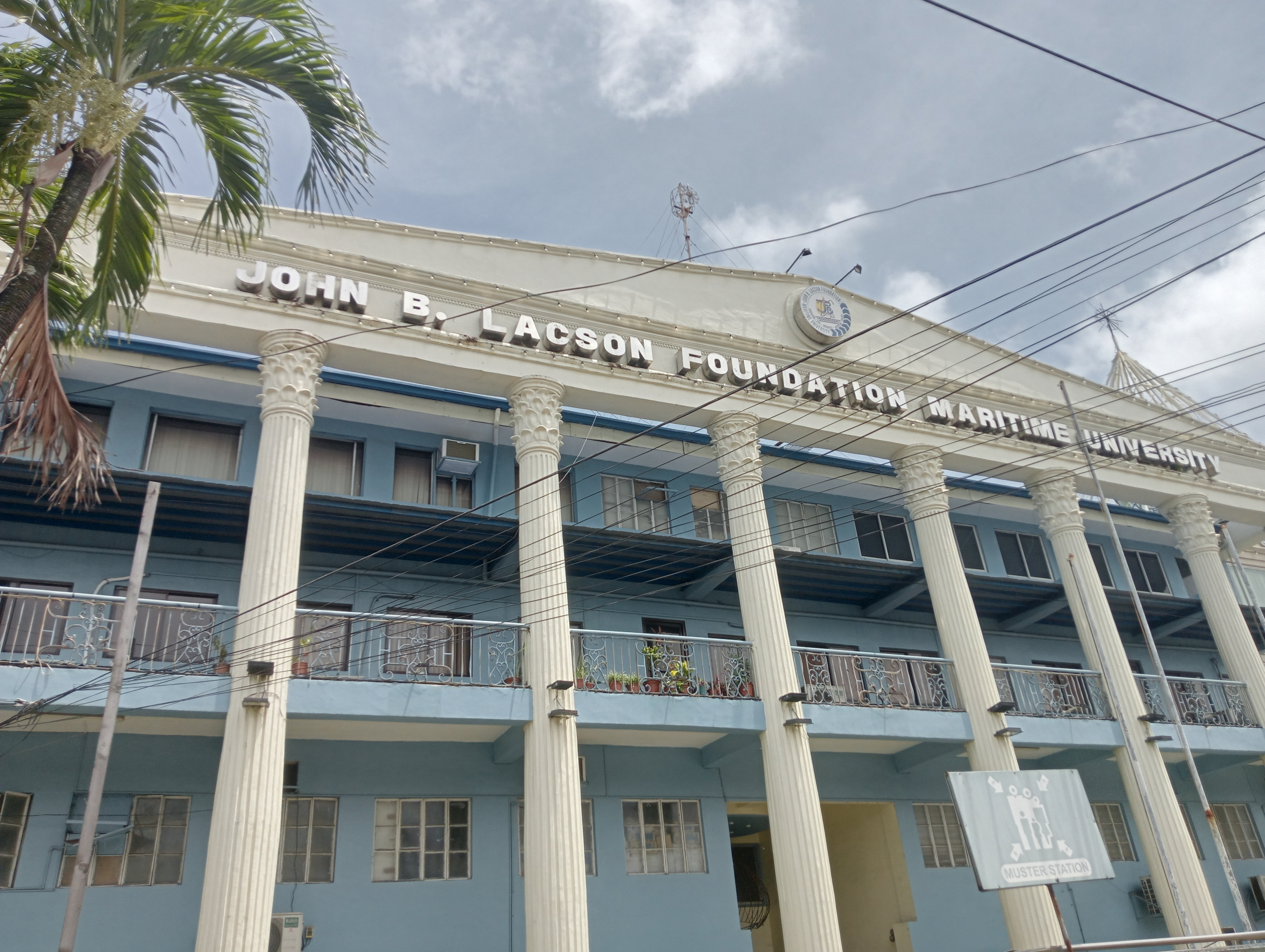
John B. Lacson Foundation Maritime University main campus in Molo

Molo was an educational center during the Spanish occupation in the Philippines, being the only pueblo (town) in the country which has four colleges—Collegio de Santa Ana of the Avanceña sisters; Centro Escolar de Molo of the Salas brothers; Instituto Ensenanza Libre de Molo of Manuel Locsin; and Escuela Publica. In 1903, the labor leader and writer Rosendo Mejica founded the Baluarte Elementary School, the first public elementary school outside of Manila; his house, fronting the school, is a museum.

Molo has one university, John B. Lacson Foundation Maritime University, and four colleges—Iloilo City Community College; Iloilo Doctors' College; Iloilo Doctors' College of Medicine; and St. Therese – MTC colleges.

The national high school of the city, Iloilo City National High School, is also located in Molo.

== Notable people ==
Several known families that come from Molo include - the Locsin, Lacson, Sayson, Pison, Layson, Yusay, Sanson, Ganzon, Kiamko among others, some of whom are descended from Chinese immigrants who hispanized, adopted Roman Catholicism, married Filipino or Spanish individuals, and settled in Molo.

Being an educational center during the Spanish occupation in the Philippines and being known as the "Athens of the Philippines", Molo produced many learned men and political leaders, including many chief justices, justices of the Supreme Court, senators, governors, mayors, several generals of the Philippine revolution, and other notable figures. A few of the notable Moleños include:

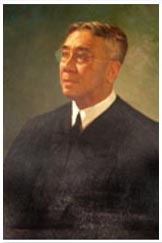
Ramon Avanceña, Chief Justice of the Philippines from 1925 to 1941

- Agustin Locsin (Wo Sin Lok), a prominent figure in Iloilo City's history and is known as the patriarch of the Locsin family of the Philippines. He was a Fujianese immigrant who arrived in Iloilo in the 1700s and later adopted the Hispanic name Agustín Locsín, becoming a Christian convert.
- Ramon Avanceña, former Chief Justice of the Supreme Court of the Philippines and served as a legal adviser to the Federal State of the Visayas, the revolutionary government of provinces of Iloilo, Capiz and Antique.
- Jhett Tolentino, award-winning Broadway producer.
- Rodolfo T. Ganzon, Filipino politician and a former Senator of the Republic of the Philippines, Congressman of the Second District of Iloilo, Mayor of Iloilo City.
- Jed Patrick Mabilog, former Mayor of Iloilo City.
- Franklin Drilon, Senate Minority Leader and former president of the Senate of the Philippines.
- Gregorio Araneta, former chief justice and Secretary of the Malolos Congress and First Secretary of Justice.
- Raymundo Melliza, former chief justice, general of the Philippine Revolution, and Governor of Iloilo.
- Felicisimo Feria, former chief justice.
- Francisco Villanueva, former senator and Representative of the First District of Iloilo, and as the first senator of the Seventh Senatorial District comprising Iloilo, Capiz and Romblon. He also served as Senate Majority Floor Leader during the Fourth Legislature in 1916-1919.
- Esteban de la Rama, former senator.
- Esperidion Guanco, former senator.
- Ignacio and Maria Arroyo, philanthropists
- Jose Ma. Arroyo, former senator and Representative of the First District of Iloilo from 1916 to 1919. He is the grandfather of former first gentleman, Jose Miguel Arroyo, who is the husband of former president Gloria Macapagal Arroyo.
- Francisco Zulueta, former senator.
- Jose C. Zulueta, former Governor of Iloilo provincial governor of Iloilo and Senator.
- Potenciano Treñas, former senator.
- Amado Avanceña, former governor of Iloilo.
- Gregorio Yulo, former governor of Iloilo.
- Mariano Yulo, former governor of Negros Occidental.
- Jose Yulo-Regalado, former governor of Iloilo.
- Timoteo Consing Sr., former governor of Iloilo.
- Esteban de la Rama, former general of the Philippine Revolution and first commandant of the Philippine Marines.
- Pablo Araneta, former general of the Philippine Revolution.
- Angel Corteza, former General of the Philippine Revolution.
- Aniceto Lacson, former general of the Philippine Revolution and leader of the Negros Revolution.
- Juan Araneta, former general of the Philippine Revolution and leader of the Negros Revolution.

== See also ==
- Molo Church
- Molo Mansion
- Pancit Molo
