= Philippine Coast Guard Officers' Basic Education and Training Center =

Philippine Coast Guard Officers' Basic Education and Training Center (PCGOBETC)
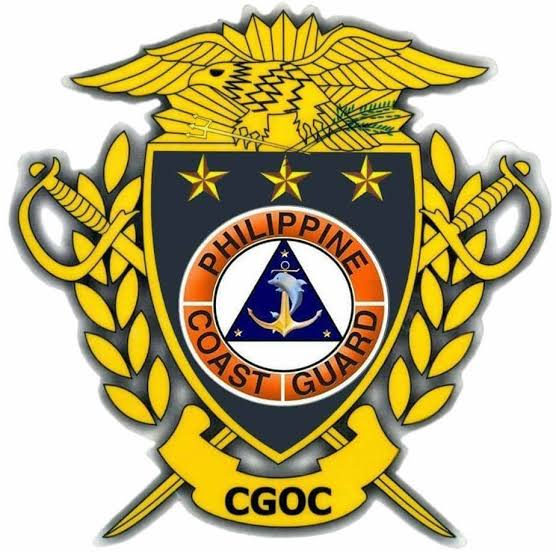
- Insignia of the PCGOBETC
- Philippines

Information
- Type: Officer candidate school
- Color
- Affiliation: Philippine Coast Guard

The Philippine Coast Guard Officers' Basic Education and Training Center (PCGOBETC) serves as the officer candidate school of Philippine Coast Guard officer aspirants. Cadets who are already baccalaureate degree holders taking the Coast Guard Officers’ Course (CGOC) became Probationary Ensigns (PENS) and after graduation are commissioned as regular officers in the organization.

The Philippine Army, Philippine Navy and the Philippine Air Force equivalent of the PCGOBETC are the Training and Doctrine Command (TRADOC)’s Officer Candidate Schools (OCS).

== Proposal of establishing the Philippine Coast Guard Academy ==
Since the Philippine Coast Guard does not have its own service academy to produce its own officers, it relies from the graduates of the Philippine Military Academy (PMA), Philippine Merchant Marine Academy (PMMA), US Coast Guard Academy (USCGA), Maritime Academy of Asia and the Pacific (MAAP), and Coast Guard Officers’ Course (CGOC) as source of its officers. This situation is being addressed with the filing of House Bill 4161 drafted by Congressman Ferdinand Martin Romualdez and Tingog-Partylist Congresswoman Yedda Marie Romualdez to the 18th Congress of House of Representatives. This bill seeks the establishment of the Coast Guard's own academy similar to the existing Philippine service academies, namely the Philippine Military Academy and the Philippine National Police Academy, as its primary source of commissioned officers who are principally educated and trained in maritime law enforcement and administration. The academy is currently under construction in Barangay Misibis, Cagraray Island, Bacacay, Albay. The Philippine Coast Guard Academy will be patterned after the United States Coast Guard Academy.

== See also ==
- Philippine Coast Guard
- Cadet rank in the Philippines
