= Lacson =

Filipino family

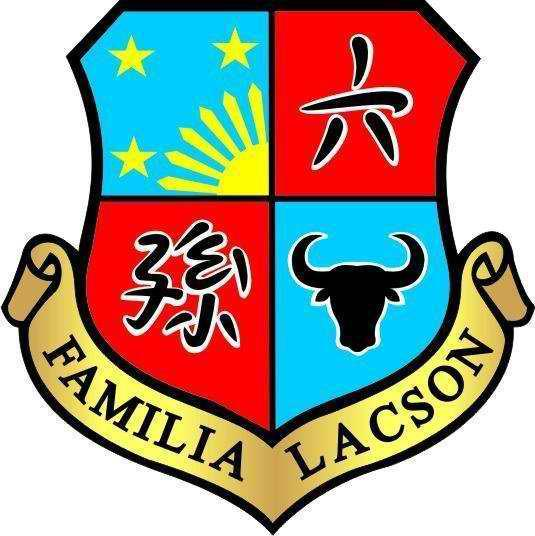
- Current region: Western Visayas, Negros Island Region, Pampanga and Metro Manila, Philippines
- Etymology: "Sixth Grandson"
- Origin: Molo, Iloilo City and Negros Occidental

Lacson is a Filipino surname with historical roots originating in the provinces of Iloilo and Negros Occidental, with branches later extending to National Capital Region, Cavite, and Pampanga. They are a prominent family involved in business, politics, real estate, and agriculture. Historical records indicate members serving as gobernadorcillos during the Spanish era and later participating in governance, commerce, and civic duties during the Japanese and American occupations.

The Lacson surname originated among Chinese-mestizo families in Molo before the 1849 Clavería decree and likely derives from the Hokkien la̍k-sun. The surname is a transliteration of Spanish orthography from the Chinese-Spanish name la̍k-sun, combining 六 (la̍k, meaning "sixth," possibly indicating birth order) and 孫 (sūn, meaning "grandchild"), and was also historically spelled as Laxon and Laczon by the Spaniards.

The clan traces much of its documented ancestry to Don Lorenzo Lacson and his descendants, although its origins likely extend further back, possibly to the 1700s. As the surname predates the 1849 Clavería decree, it was generally preserved within the lineage rather than widely assigned to unrelated families. Consequently, individuals bearing the Lacson surname, as well as those who can trace their ancestry to the Lacson line, are generally considered to be distantly related through common ancestral origins.

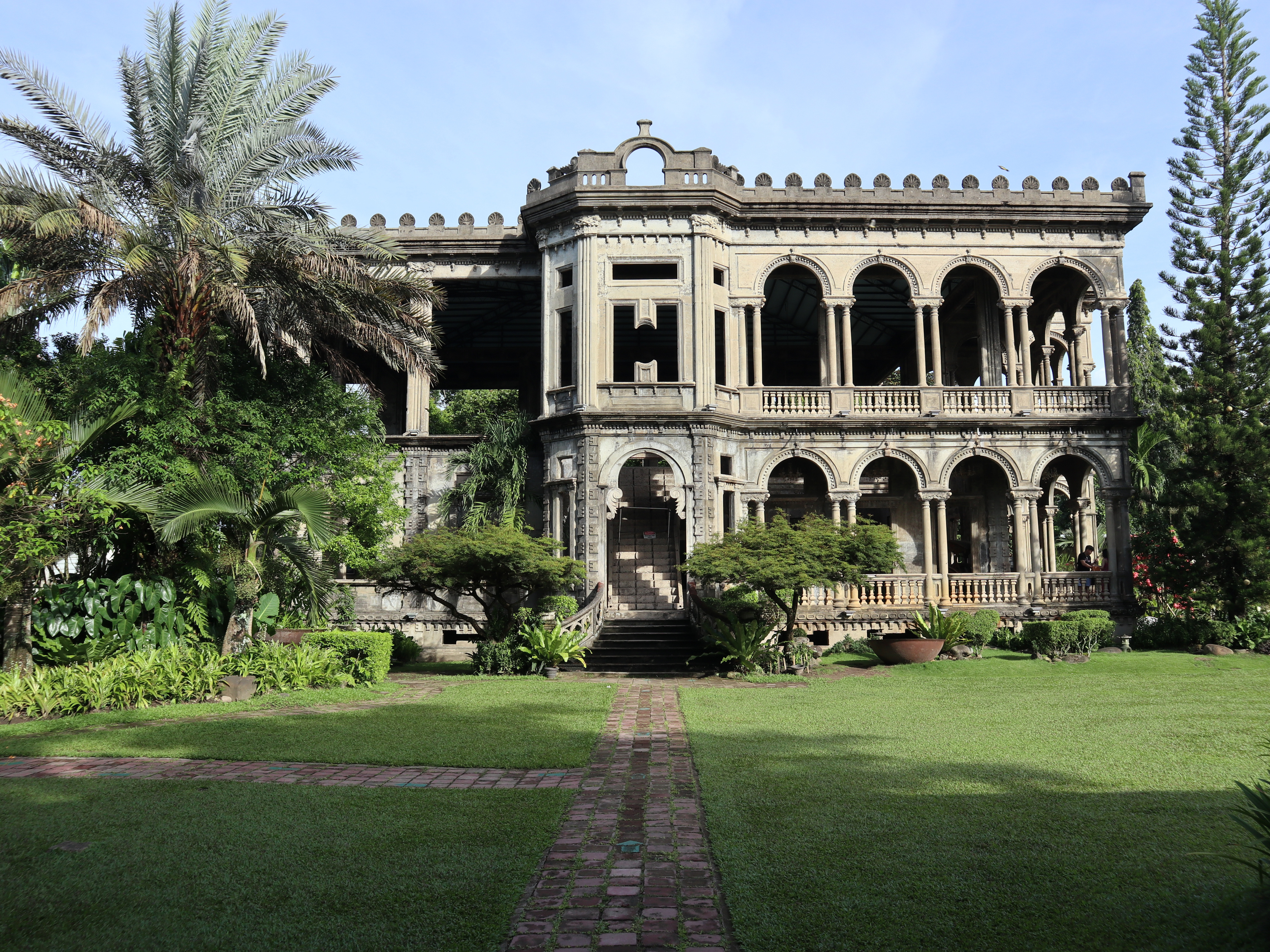
The Lacson Ruins of Talisay City, Negros Occidental

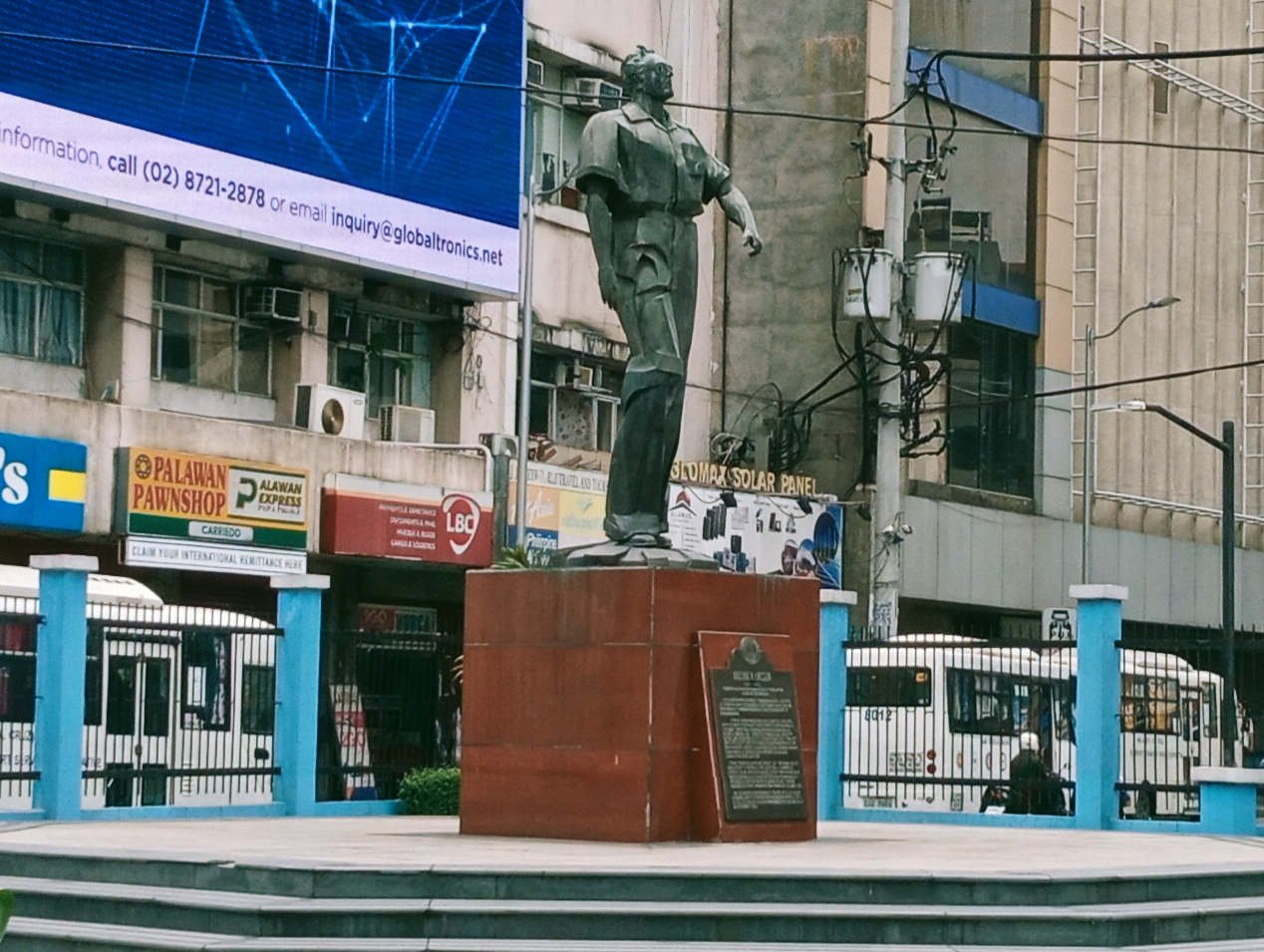
Arsenio Lacson Monument in Plaza Lacson, Santa Cruz, Manila

== Notable members of the family ==
=== Politics ===
==== National politics ====
- José María Lacson Arroyo y Pidal (1875–1927), Filipino Politician, Representative of Iloilo's 1st Congressional District from 1916 to 1919, Senator of the 7th Senatorial District
- Jose Miguel Arroyo (1946), 1st First Gentleman of the Philippines, and 1st Second Gentleman of the Philippines as the husband of Gloria Macapagal Arroyo the 14th President of the Philippines and 10th Vice President of the Philippines, son of Ignacio Lacson Arroyo II
- Alex Lacson (1965), Filipino author, reform advocate, lawyer, and Senatorial candidate
- Aniceto Lacson (1857–1931), Filipino revolutionary general, sugar farmer, and businessman in the Philippines
- Isaac Lacson (1889–1964), Filipino politician, son of Gen. Aniceto Lacson, Governor of Negros Occidental (1931–1934), representative of the 8th senatorial district
- Panfilo Lacson (1948), Filipino Senator, former Director-General of the Philippine National Police

==== Camarines Sur ====
- Dato Arroyo (1974), Member of the House of Representatives of the Philippines from the 1st congressional district of Camarines Sur, grandson of Ignacio Lacson Arroyo II

==== Metro Manila ====
- Arsenio Lacson (1911–1962), Filipino journalist, lawyer, and politician, nephew of Gen. Aniceto Lacson, Mayor of Manila (1952–1962)

==== Negros Occidental ====
- Iggy Arroyo (1950–2012), Member of the Philippine House of Representatives from Negros Occidental's 5th congressional district son of Ignacio Lacson Arroyo II
- Daniel "Bitay" Lacson Jr. (1947–2024), Filipino politician, Governor of Negros Occidental during the Fourth Republic (1986–1987), and Fifth Republic (1988–1992). Former President and CEO of Negros Navigation, founder of the Negros Trade Fair in 1985.
- Daniel G. Lacson Sr., Filipino Politician, Mayor of Talisay City, Negros Occidental (1945–1947)
- David Lacson (1975–2021), Filipino politician, Mayor of E.B Magalona, Negros Occidental
- Eugenio Jose Lacson (born 1959), Filipino politician, current Governor of Negros Occidental
- Rafael B. Lacson (1896–1979), Filipino politician, son of Don Mariano Lacson, Mayor of Talisay City (1938–1941), Governor of Negros Occidental (1946–1951)
- Felipe B. Lacson, Filipino Politician, Mayor of Talisay City, Negros Occidental (1947–1955)
- Jose Carlos "Kako" Lacson (1942), Filipino politician, Mayor of Talisay City (1972–1980), Congressman of the 3rd District of Negros Occidental (1987–1998; 2001–2010)
- Juan Lacson, Filipino Politician, Mayor of Talisay City, Negros Occidental (1906–1911)
- Rosendo L. Lacson (1854–1926), Filipino Politician, brother of Gen. Aniceto Lacson, signatory of the Acta de Capitulacion during the Negros Revolution, first Mayor of Talisay City during the Negros Republic (1898–1900)
- Maria Lourdes Arroyo Lesaca, member of the House of Representatives of the Philippines from Negros Occidental's 5th congressional district, daughter of Ignacio Lacson Arroyo II
- Aurelio Lacson Locsin Sr. (1896–1974), Filipino politician, Mayor of Bacolod City, Negros Occidental (1946)

==== Pampanga ====
- Mikey Arroyo,(1969) Member of the House of Representatives of the Philippines from Pampanga's 2nd congressional district, 10th Vice governor of Pampanga, grandson of Ignacio Lacson Arroyo II
- Agustin Lacson, Filipino politician, Gobernadorcillo of San Fernando, Pampanga (1854–1855)
- Anacleto S. Lacson, Filipino politician, Gobernardorcillo of Magalang, Pampanga (1871–1873)
- Aniceto S. Lacson, Filipino politician, Gobernardorcillo of Magalang, Pampanga (1891–1893)
- Cosme Lacson, Filipino politician, Gobernadorcillo of San Fernando, Pampanga (1856–1857)
- Daniel L. Lacson Jr., Filipino Politician, Mayor of Magalang, Pampanga (1988–1998)
- Daniel O. Lacson, Filipino politician, Alcalde Mayor of Magalang, Pampanga (1899–1901)
- Daniel T. Lacson Sr., Filipino politician, Mayor of Magalang, Pampanga (1968–1986)
- Manuel S. Lacson, Filipino politician, Gobernadorcillo of Magalang, Pampanga (1868)
- Maria Lourdes P. Lacson, Filipina politician, current and first female Mayor of Magalang, Pampanga

==== Tarlac ====
- Benjamin Lacson, Filipino politician, Mayor of Concepcion, Tarlac (2001–2004)
- Andres Lacson (1976), Filipino politician, Mayor of Concepcion, Tarlac, and vice chairman of Aksyon Demokratiko (2013–2022)

=== Religion ===
- Ignacio Lacson Arroyo Sr. (1851–1935), Filipino philanthropist and sugar farmer, co-founder of the Beaterio de Molo with his wife Maria Regalado Pidal de Arroyo (1860–1920), great-grandparents of First Gentleman Mike Arroyo, and Iggy Arroyo

=== Business ===
- Dr. Jaime Lacson Claparols, Filipino-Spanish businessman, son of Doña Carmen Lacson-Claparols and Ricardo Claparols, founder of the JRS Express in 1960

=== Academia ===
- John B. Lacson (1898–1992), Filipino sea captain and academician, founder of John B. Lacson Foundation Maritime University in 1948.
- Atty. Ricardo Conlu Lacson (1888), Philippine lawyer and educator, co-founder of Philippine Law School in 1915.
- Atty. Simeon Conlu Lacson (1887), Philippine lawyer and educator, co-founder of Philippine Law School in 1915.
- Soledad Lacson-Locsin (1905–1995), Filipina author, translated Jose Rizal's Noli Me Tangere to the English language, sister of Mayor Arsenio Lacson. Founder of Casanova School which was later donated to Colegio San Agustin – Bacolod in 1961.

=== Arts and society ===
- Carlos "Caloy" Balcells, Filipino-Spanish musician, descendant of Doña Carmen Lacson-Claparols, bass guitarist of Filipino rock band The Dawn
- Rose Lacson (1948), Filipina-Australian socialite and businesswoman, formerly married to iron ore magnate Lang Hancock, granddaughter of Gen. Aniceto Lacson, niece of Mayor Arsenio Lacson
- Arch. Dominador Lacson Lugtu, Filipino architect, principal designer who built the Araneta Coliseum

== See also ==
- Lacson Avenue, major thoroughfare in Manila, Metro Manila, Philippines, named after Arsenio Lacson
- Lacson Underpass, first pedestrian underpass in the Philippines, named after Arsenio Lacson
- Plaza Lacson, historic square in the city of Manila, located near Santa Cruz Church
- Fountain of Justice, historic landmark in Bacolod city, site of Spanish surrender to Gen. Aniceto Lacson during the Negros Revolution
- Negros Revolution, 1898 political movement ended Spanish control on Negros Island, established the three-month Cantonal Republic of Negros, and led to American annexation in 1901, led by Gen. Aniceto Lacson
- Republic of Negros, a brief revolutionary state in Negros Island, led by Gen. Aniceto Lacson
- Lacson Ruins, Talisay, Negros Occidental, Philippines; ancestral home of the heirs of Don Mariano Lacson
- Cesar Lacson Locsin Ancestral House, Silay, Negros Occidental, Philippines; home of El Ideal Bakery
- Lacson-Yusay Ancestral Mansion, Molo, Iloilo City, Philippines; known otherwise as the Molo Mansion
- John B. Lacson Foundation Maritime University, Molo, Iloilo City, Philippines; first Filipino maritime school in the Visayas and Mindanao
- John B. Lacson Colleges Foundation – Bacolod, private maritime college in Bacolod, Negros Occidental, Philippines
- List of Political Families in the Philippines
- Hispanicized Filipino-Chinese surnames
