= Philippine Navy Reserve Command =

Major Support Command of the Philippine Navy

Reserve Command, Philippine Navy
- Pangasiwaan ng Panlaang Kawal ng Hukbong Dagat
- Active: May 12, 1993 - present
- Country: Philippines
- Branch: Philippine Navy
- Type: Military reserve force
- Role: Conventional and unconventional warfare; Anti-guerrilla operations; Combat support & service support; Force multiplier; Training; Humanitarian assistance and disaster response (HADR); Community service
- Size: 120,000+ in ready reserve status, 50,000+ in standby reserve status
- Garrison/HQ: Naval Base Heracleo Alano, Cavite City, Province of Cavite
- Decorations: Philippine Republic Presidential Unit Citation Badge

Commanders
- Current commander: Commodore Estelito B. Lagadia, PN (acting)

Insignia
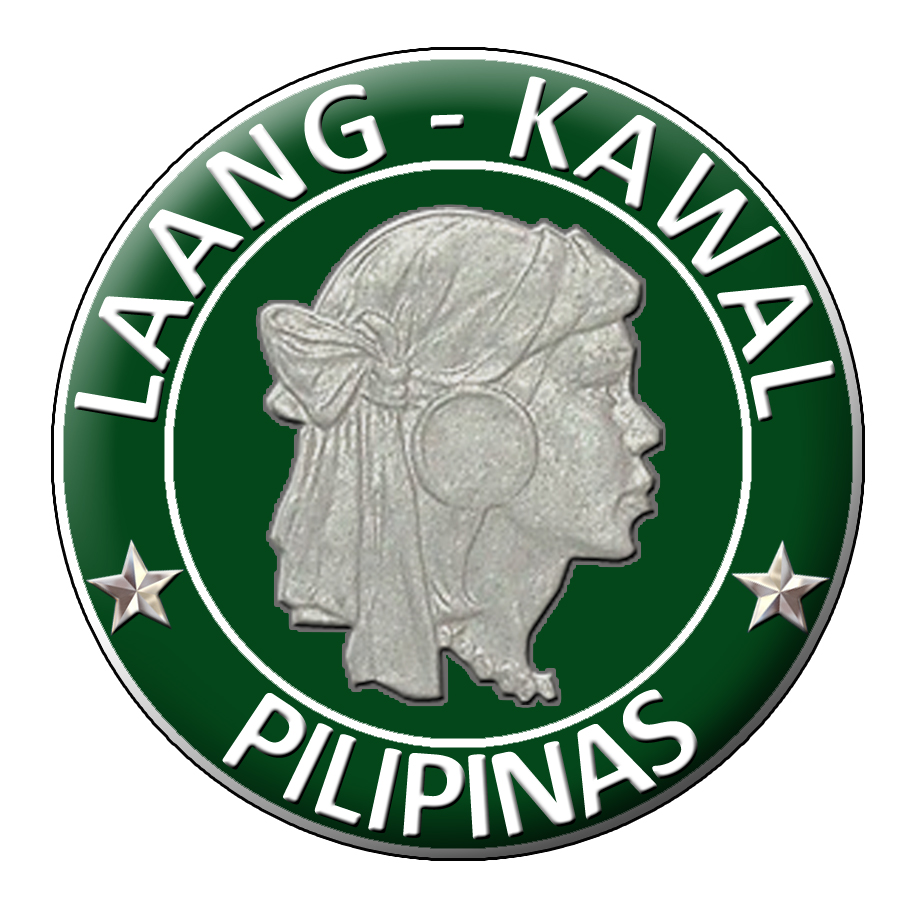
- AFP Reserve Force shoulder sleeve insignia

The Reserve Command, Philippine Navy (RESCOM, PN), (Filipino: Pangasiwaan ng Panlaang Kawal ng Hukbong Dagat) is a Major Support Command created for the sole purpose of naval, and Marine reserve force management, procurement, and organization.

== Vision ==
A committed, well-trained, and ready Reserve Force for a Strong Republic.

== Mission ==
To organize, train, equip, and administer naval, and Marine Reservists in order to provide the Philippine Navy the base for expansion in the event of war, invasion, or rebellion or disaster and calamities, and to assist in the socio-economic development of the country.

== Legal mandate ==
=== Commonwealth Act 1 ===
Commonwealth Act No. 1, particularly Section II, cites the responsibility of each and every citizen of for the defense of the nation. Citizens may be mobilized in the event the national government declares an act of war or emergency.

=== Republic Act 7077 ===
Republic Act No. 7077, also known as the Citizen's Armed Force Act or Reservist Law of 1991, is an act passed in to law by the joint house of representatives which clearly provides the policies and procedures in the creation and administration of reservists and reserve units of the Armed Forces of the Philippines.

=== Republic Act 9163 ===
Republic Act No. 9163, also known as the National Service Training Program Act or National Service Law of 2001, defines the policies and procedures in administration/training of ROTC Units in relation to the other two components, Civic Welfare Training Service (CWTS) and Literacy Training Service (LTS), of the National Service Training Program (NSTP).

== Training ==
Training is one of the primary tasks that is handled by RESCOM, PN. The three primary sources of Naval Reservists (Filipino: Laang Kawal Pandagat) are:

- Naval Reserve Officer Training Corps (NROTC) - given to tertiary-level students who voluntarily signed for ROTC under the National Service Training Program (NSTP),
- Basic Citizen's Military Course (BCMC) - for civilians from all professions who did not take ROTC, and would want to become a part of the AFP Reserve Force on top of being corporate professionals, and
- Military Orientation Training (MOT) - for volunteer employees of private or public organizations of utility service providers assigned as a Philippine Navy Affiliated Reserve Unit (PNARU)

RESCOM, PN, also through its ROTC Program, prepares future officers in the Navy serving in the reserve force. Under the Naval Officer Qualification Course (NOQC), college graduates are trained to take roles as officers in the Philippine Navy and the Philippine Marine Corps.

== Types of Naval reservists ==
There are currently three types of reservists in the Armed Forces of the Philippines (AFP) Reserve Force:

=== Categorization of reservists and reserve units ===
Section 12, Article 5, of Republic Act 7077 breaks down and categorizes reservists and their units based on various criteria cited by this law.

- First Category Reservists - Able bodied reservists aged 18 up to 35 years of age, inclusive
- Second Category Reservists - Able bodied reservists aged 36 up to 51 years of age, inclusive
- Third Category Reservists - All able-bodied reservists aged above 52 years of age

=== Classification of reservists and reserve units ===
Section 13, Article 5, of Republic Act 7077 clearly cites the classification of reservists based on their operational readiness for immediate deployment or mobilization.

- Ready Reserve - physically fit and tactically current reservist personnel that are always on constant alert and training; ready to mobilize once a mobilization order has been given. Reservists who belong to/work for a PNARU is also classified under the Ready Reserve.
- Standby Reserve - Reservists who do not maintain currency in specialization qualifications but the base for expansion, support and augmentation to the Ready Reserve Force as needed.
- Retired Reserve - composed of citizens who are qualified for retirement either by length of service or age.

== Lineage of commanding officers ==
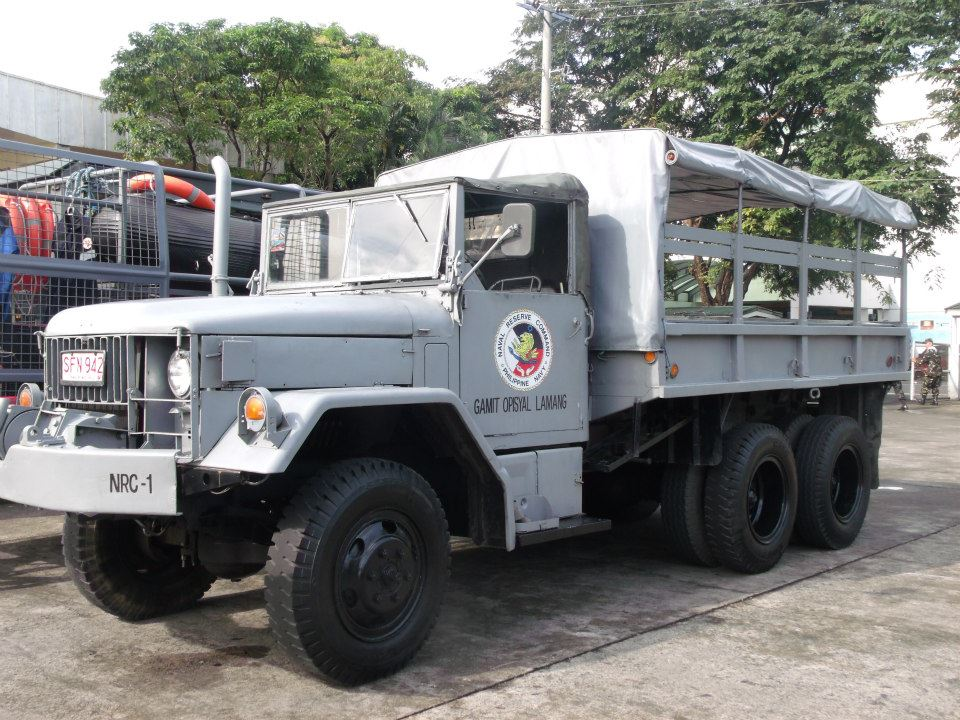
An M35 2 1/2-ton truck detailed with the Navy Reserve Command

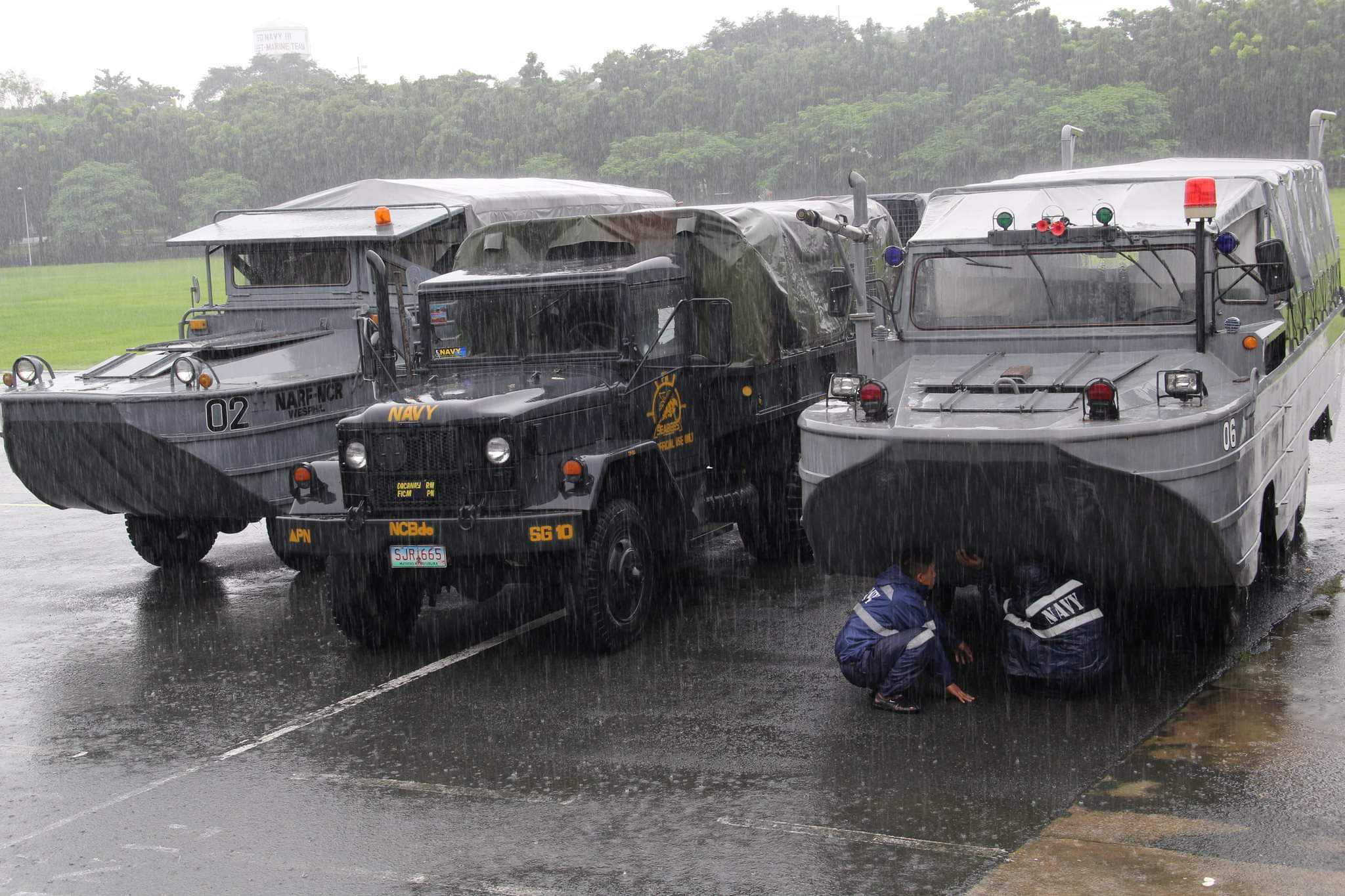
A pair of Navy Reserve Command amphibious trucks, along with an M35 truck of the Naval Combat Engineer Brigade

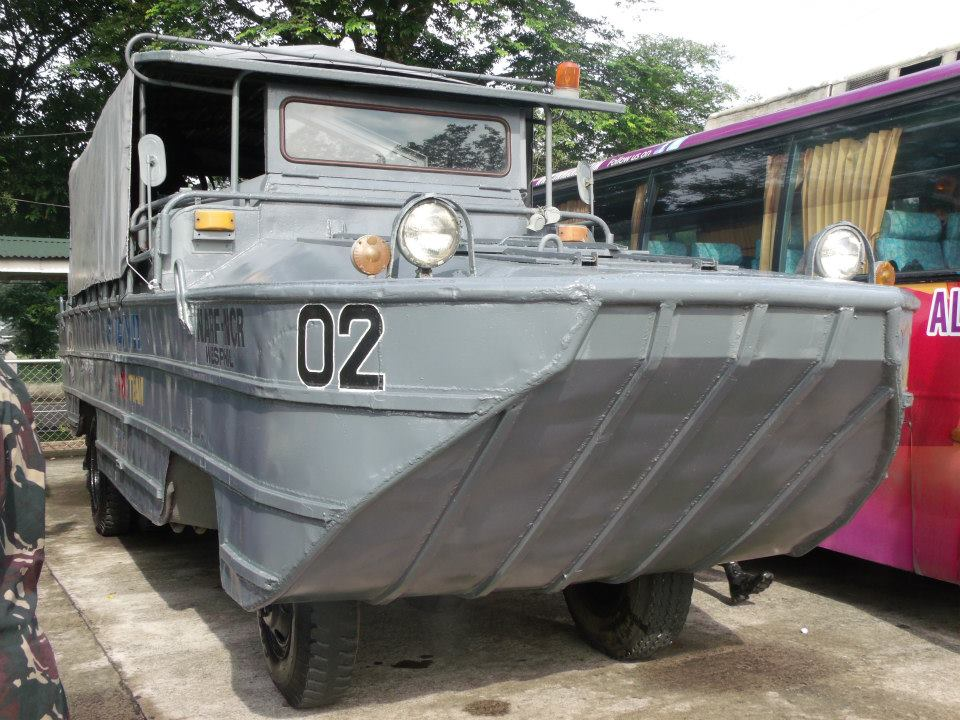
DUKW assigned to the 202nd NRS

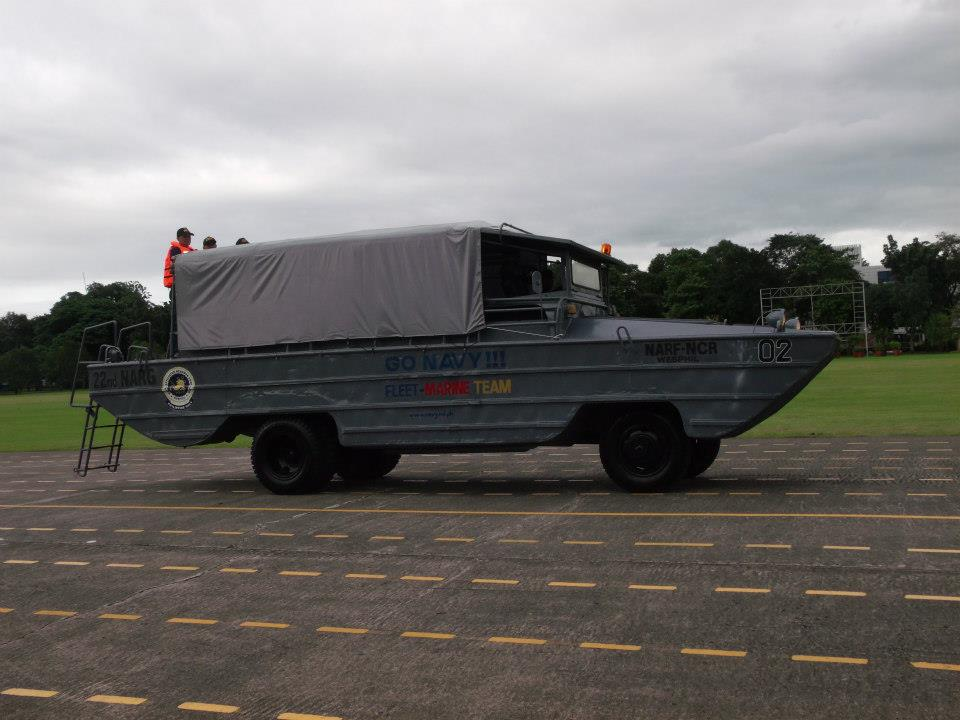
DUKW of the 202nd NRS during the 2012 AFP Reservist Day Parade at Camp Aguinaldo

Tenure begin	Tenure end	Rank	Name	Branch
	Nov 2010	BGEN	Bernardo Ferrer	PN(M)
Nov 2010	Oct 2012	COMMO	Jesus C Millan	PN
Oct 2012	Dec 2014	COMMO	Primitivo P Gopo	PN
Dec 2014	16 Jun 2016	MGEN	Alvin A Parreño	PN(M)
16 Jun 2016	Aug 2018	BGEN	Arthur M Biyo	PN(M)
Aug 2018	Nov 2019	MGEN	Dante M Hidalgo	PN(M)
Nov 2019	21 Jan 2021	MGEN	Ariel R Caculitan	PN(M)
21 Jan 2021	28 Jul 2022	RADM	Dorvin Jose L Legaspi	PN
28 Jul 2022	15 Aug 2022	COL	Simplitius G Adacer (acting)	PN(M)
15 Aug 2022	Nov 2024	MGEN	Joseph Ferrous S Cuison	PN(M)
Dec 2024	28 Oct 2026	MGEN	Doroteo Jose M Jalandoni	PN(M)
28 Oct 2026	10 Nov 2026	COMMO	Redentor R Cortezano (acting)	PN
10 Nov 2026	present	COMMO	Estelito B Lagadia	PN

== Organization ==
=== Mobilization centers ===
- Naval Reserve Center - National Capital Region (NRCen-NCR)
- Naval Reserve Center - Northern Luzon (NRCen-NL)
- Naval Reserve Center - Southern Luzon (NRCen-SL)
- Naval Reserve Center - West (NRCen-W)
- Naval Reserve Center - Eastern Visayas (NRCen-EV)
- Naval Reserve Center - Western Visayas (NRCen-WV)
- Naval Reserve Center - Eastern Mindanao (NRCen-EM)
- Naval Reserve Center - Western Mindanao (NRCen-WM)

=== Naval reserve units ===
- Naval Forces Reserve - NCR (NFR-NCR) (Fort Santiago, Cabildo St, Intramuros, Manila)
  - 22nd Naval Group Reserve
    - 221st Naval Squadron Reserve
    - 222nd Naval Squadron Reserve
    - 223rd Naval Squadron Reserve
- Naval Forces Reserve - Northern Luzon (NFR-NL) (Naval Station Ernesto Ogbinar, Poro Point, San Fernando, La Union)
  - 11th Naval Group Reserve
    - 111th Naval Squadron Reserve
    - 112th Naval Squadron Reserve - Ilocos Sur
    - 113th Naval Service Support Squadron Reserve - Ilocos Norte
  - 12th Naval Group Reserve
    - 121st Naval Squadron Reserve - Dagupan City, Pangasinan
    - 122nd Naval Combat Support Squadron Reserve - Baguio City
    - 123rd Naval Service Support Squadron Reserve - Naval Station Leovigildo Gantioqui, Zambales
- Naval Forces Reserve - Southern Luzon (NFR-SL) (Naval Station Julhasan Arasain, Rawis, Legazpi City, Albay)
  - 31st Naval Group Reserve
    - 311th Naval Squadron Reserve - Albay
    - 312th Naval Squadron Reserve - Sorsogon
    - 313th Naval Squadron Reserve - Masbate
  - 32nd Naval Group Reserve
    - 321st Naval Squadron Reserve - Batangas
    - 322nd Naval Squadron Reserve - Quezon
    - 323rd Naval Squadron Reserve - Occidental Mindoro
- Naval Forces Reserve - West (NFR-W) (Camp Tiniguiban, Puerto Princesa, Palawan)
  - 41st Naval Group Reserve
    - 411th Naval Squadron Reserve - Coron, Palawan
- Naval Forces Reserve - Eastern Visayas (NFR-EV) (Pier 3, Arellano Blvd., Brgy. Tinago, Cebu City)
  - 51st Naval Group Reserve
    - 511st Naval Squadron Reserve - Cebu City
    - 512nd Naval Squadron Reserve - Camotes Islands
    - 513rd Naval Squadron Reserve - Southern Cebu Province
  - 52nd Naval Group Reserve
    - 521st Naval Squadron Reserve - Tagbilaran, Bohol
    - 522nd Naval Squadron Reserve - Dumaguete, Negros Oriental
    - 523rd Naval Squadron Reserve - Tacloban City
- Naval Forces Reserve - Western Visayas (NFR-WV) (Villa Arevalo District, Iloilo City)
  - 81st Naval Group Reserve
    - 811st Naval Squadron Reserve - Iloilo
    - 812nd Naval Squadron Reserve - Aklan
    - 813rd Naval Squadron Reserve - Antique
  - 82nd Naval Group Reserve
    - 823rd Naval Squadron Reserve - Boracay, Malay, Aklan
  - 84th Naval Group Reserve
    - 841st Naval Squadron Reserve - Hamtic, Antique
- Naval Forces Reserve - Eastern Mindanao (NFR-EM) (Naval Station Felix Apolinario, Davao City)
  - 72nd Naval Group Reserve - Surigao Del Sur
    - 721st Naval Squadron Reserve
    - 722nd Naval Squadron Reserve
- Naval Forces Reserve - Western Mindanao (NFR-WM) (Naval Station Rio Hondo, Brgy Rio Hondo, Zamboanga City)
  - 61st Naval Group Reserve
    - 613rd Naval Squadron Reserve - Pagadian City

=== Marine reserve units ===
- 7th Marine Brigade (Reserve) - NCR (HQS Philippine Marines, Bonifacio Naval Station, Taguig City)
  - 71st Marine Battalion (Reserve)
  - 72nd Marine Battalion (Reserve)
  - 73rd Marine Battalion (Reserve)
- 8th Marine Brigade (Reserve) - (Dagupan City)
  - 81st Marine Battalion (Reserve) - Iloilo City
  - 82nd Marine Battalion (Reserve)
  - 83rd Marine Battalion (Reserve)
  - 84th Marine Battalion (Reserve)
- 9th Marine Brigade (Reserve) - (Naval Station Felix Apolinario, Davao City)
  - 91st Marine Battalion (Reserve) - Zamboanga City
    - 932nd Marine Company Reserve - Pagadian City
- 13th Marine Brigade (Reserve) - (Alabel, Sarangani)

=== Naval Reserve Officers Training Corps units (NROTCUs) ===
- 149th NROTCU - Philippine Merchant Marine Academy
- 152nd NROTCU - Northwestern University, Laoag, Ilocos Norte
- 164th NROTCU – University of Cagayan Valley (UCV)
- 169th NROTCU - Maritime Academy of Asia and the Pacific (MAAP), Bataan
- 236th NROTCU - Technological University of the Philippines - Cavite
- 244th NROTCU – Philippine Maritime Institute (PMI) Colleges, Quezon City
- 245th NROTCU – Philippine Merchant Marine School (PMMS) - Las Piñas
- 246th NROTCU – Adamson University (AdU), City of Manila
- 247th NROTCU – De La Salle University – Manila (DLSU-M)
- 248th NROTCU - Philippine Merchant Marine School - Manila
- 250th NROTCU - NAMEI Polytechnic Institute, Mandaluyong
- 267th NROTCU – De La Salle University – Dasmariñas (DLSU-D), Cavite
- 270th NROTCU – University of Makati (UMak)
- 275th NROTCU - FEATI University
- 277th NROTCU - Taguig City University
- 278th NROTCU - Navotas Polytechnic College
- 279th NROTCU - University of Perpetual Help System DALTA (UPHSD) - Las Piñas Campus
- 307th NROTCU – Batangas State University (BSU) - Alangilan Campus
- 380th NROTCU - Westmead International School, Batangas City
- 355th NROTCU - Liceo de San Jacinto Foundation, Masbate
- 516th NROTCU – Palompon Institute of Technology (PIT), Palompon, Leyte
- 355th NROTCU – Bicol Merchant Marine Institute, Inc. (BMMCI), Sorsogon City, Sorsogon
- 522nd NROTCU – Negros Oriental State University (NORSU)
- 534th NROTCU – Eastern Visayas State University (EVSU)
- 566th NROTCU - Concord Technical Institute, Inc., San Nicolas, Cebu City
- 610th NROTCU - Zamboanga Peninsula Polytechnic State University
- 613th NROTCU - Our Lady of Triumph Institute of Technology, Pagadian
- 627th NROTCU – Zamboanga State College of Marine Sciences and Technology (ZSCMST)
- 678th NROTCU – Mindanao State University – Naawan Campus (MSU-N)
- 723rd NROTCU - Davao del Norte State College (DNSC)
- 768th NROTCU – DMMA College of Southern Philippines, Davao City
- 777th NROTCU - Holy Cross of Davao College
- 802nd NROTCU – John B. Lacson Foundation Maritime University – Arevalo, Iloilo City
- 824th NROTCU – John B. Lacson Colleges Foundation – Bacolod, Negros Occidental

=== Naval Affiliated Reserve units (NARUs) ===
- 4th Naval Construction Battalion (Reserve)
- Naval Affiliated Reserve Force-NCR (WESPHIL)
- 27th Naval Affiliated Reserve Group (Rescue Recon 1)
- 70th Naval Affiliated Reserve Group (Davao Oriental Ringnetters Association, Inc.) (DORRA)
- 201st Naval Affiliated Reserve Squadron (Manila Yacht Club)
- Maritime Academy of Asia and the Pacific (MAAP) PNARU
- Pacific Roadlink Logistics, Inc. (PRLI) PNARU
- Gerardo D.R. Mendoza (GDRM) Leopard Seal Organization, Inc. PNARU

== Prominent Filipino Navy reservists ==
- ENS Enrico Raphael Q. Nacino, MAN, RN, PN(Res) - actor; Second Prince, StarStruck season 5; honorary member, Naval Special Warfare Force
- CPO Christopher S. De Leon, PN(Res) - actor; 8-time FAMAS Awardee
- CPO Camille Lydia A. Villar-Genuino, PN(Res) - Senator; former Representative, Las Pinas
- PO1 Jason J. Abalos, PN(Res) - actor; board member, 2nd District, Nueva Ecija
- PO1 Mikaela Louise B. Romero, PN(Res) - businesswoman; owner, Capital1 Solar Spikers, Premier Volleyball League; daughter of businessman and former Representative Mikee Romero
- PO1 Carlos Edriel P. Yulo, PN(Res) - double gold medalist, 2024 Summer Olympics (men's floor exercise, and vault)
- PO2 Patricia Bermudez-Hizon, PN(Res) - first female sportscaster in the Philippines; head, One Sports
- PO2 Ernani Lazaro "Jong" M. Cuenco, Jr., PN(Res) - actor, musician; son of National Artist for Music Ernani Cuenco; also inaugural Naval Special Warfare Reservist
- PO2 Vickie Marie Milagrosa S. Rushton-Abalos, PN(Res) - winner, Mutya ng Pilipinas 2011; finalist, Pinoy Big Brother: All In, former actress
- PO2 Megan "Sexy Megan/Megandang Megan" Sebastian-Du, PN(Res) - radio DJ, 101.1 Yes! FM Manila; also inaugural Naval Special Warfare Reservist
- PO2 Kristine Ann Soguilon-Lim, PN(Res) - multi-awarded visual artist and missionary; popularly known on social media as the "Artist on a Mission"
- PO2 John Carlo B. Tiuseco, PN(Res) - actor; winner, Survivor Philippines Season 1
- PO3 Joj Martin Agpangan, PN(Res) - actress; finalist Pinoy Big Brother: Teen Edition 4; twin sister of Jai Agpangan
- PO3 Jyra May "Jai" Agpangan, PN(Res) - actress; finalist Pinoy Big Brother: Teen Edition 4; twin sister of Joj Agpangan
- PO3 Vicente Paul B. Hizon, PN(Res) - former professional basketball player; 4x PBA champion
- PO3 Jeffrey L. Santos, PN(Res) - actor; brother of actress Judy Ann Santos
- SN1 Elizabeth Jeanjaquet "DJ Shai/Shai Tisai" Almonte, PN(Res) - radio DJ, 96.3 Easy Rock Manila, formerly of 101.1 Yes! FM Manila, voiceover artist
- SN1 Maria Mercy "Bella Thompson" Bacarisas, PN(Res) - actress
- SN1 Victoria Lorna A. Fernandez, PN(Res) - actress; 7-time FAMAS Awardee
- SN1 Karina Bautista Nakagawa, PN(Res) - actress; finalist, Pinoy Big Brother: Otso
- SN1 Elha Mae F. Nympha, PN(Res) - singer; winner, The Voice Kids (Season 2)
- SN1 Nadine "Nadia Montenegro" Pla, PN(Res) - actress

== Prominent Filipino Marine reservists ==
- MAJ Jose Sixto G. Dantes III, PN(M)(Res) - actor, host; former commissioner, National Youth Commission
- MSG Teresita Ssen L. Marquez, PN(M)(Res) - winner, Reina Hispanoamericana 2017; first Reina Hispanoamericana Filipinas titleholder, Miss World Philippines 2017
- SSG Enrico Lorenzo M Pineda, PN(M)(Res) - actor; Best Supporting Actor, 2021 FAMAS Awards
- SGT Beatrice Luigi G. Gomez-Odin, PN(M)(Res) - winner, Miss Universe Philippines 2021; top 5, Miss Universe 2021

== Ranks of Navy/Marine Corps personnel ==
=== Commissioned officers ===
Navy rank (pay grade)	Sailor's battle dress uniform (SBDU) insignia	Navy white dress shoulder insignia	Navy full black dress sleeve insignia	Marine Corps rank (pay grade)	Marine Corps service dress collar insignia	Pixelated battle dress uniform (PBDU) insignia
Admiral (O-10) ADM				General (O-10) GEN		
Vice admiral (O-9) VADM				Lieutenant general (O-9) LTGEN		
Rear admiral (O-8) RADM				Major general (O-8) MGEN		
Commodore (O-7) COMMO				Brigadier general (O-7) BGEN		
Captain (O-6) CAPT				Colonel (O-6) COL		
Commander (O-5) CDR				Lieutenant colonel (O-5) LTC		
Lieutenant commander (O-4) LCDR				Major (O-4) MAJ		
Lieutenant senior grade (O-3) LTSG/LT				Captain (O-3) CPT		
Lieutenant junior grade (O-2) LTJG				First lieutenant (O-2) 1LT		
Ensign (O-1) ENS				Second lieutenant (O-1) 2LT		

=== Enlisted ===
Navy rank (pay grade)	Sleeve/shoulder dress insignia	Sailor's battle dress uniform (SBDU) chest insignia	Marine Corps rank (pay grade)	Dress uniform sleeve insignia	Pixelated battle dress uniform (PBDU) chest insignia
First command master chief petty officer, PN (E-10) FCMCPO, PN			First chief master sergeant, AFP (E-10) FCMSG, PMC		
Master chief petty officer (E-9) MCPO			Chief master sergeant (E-9) CMSG		
Senior chief petty officer (E-8) SCPO			Senior master sergeant (E-8) SMSG		
Chief petty officer (E-7) CPO			Master Sergeant (E-7) MSG		
Petty officer first class (E-6) PO1			Technical sergeant (E-6) TSG		
Petty officer second class (E-5) PO2			Staff sergeant (E-5) SSG		
Petty officer third class (E-4) PO3			Sergeant (E-4) SGT		
Seaman first class (E-3) SN1			Corporal (E-3) CPL		
Seaman second class (E-2) SN2			Private first class (E-2) PFC		
Apprentice seaman (E-1) ASN			Private (E-1) PVT		

== Awards and decorations ==
=== Campaign streamers ===
Award streamer	Streamer name	Operation	Date awarded	Reference
	Presidential Unit Citation Badge	SAR/DRR Ops, TS Ketsana & TS Parma	February 4, 2010	General Orders No. 112, GHQ-AFP, dtd Feb 4 '10
	Presidential Unit Citation Badge	General Elections, Philippines	July 1, 2010	General Orders No. 641, GHQ-AFP, dtd July 1 '10

=== Badges ===
Military badge	Badge name	Operation	Date awarded	Reference
	Philippine Republic Presidential Unit Citation Badge	AFP's massive response and relief operations during the height of tropical storms "Ondoy" and "Pepeng" from Sep 26 to October 8, 2009. NOTE: Awarded only on the ff: 1. National Capital Region Command (Present: JTF-NCR) - NRCen-NCR - Naval Forces Reserve and Marine Brigade Reserves in NCR; 2. North Luzon Command (NOLCOM) - NRCen-NL - Naval Forces Reserve and Marine Brigade Reserves in NL; 3. South Luzon Command (SOLCOM) - NRCen-SL - Naval Forces Reserve and Marine Brigade Reserves in SL	February 4, 2010	MDD/OTAG General Orders No. 112 dtd February 4, 2010
	AFP Election Duty Badge	General elections, Philippines	May 21, 2010	General Orders No. 513, GHQ-AFP, dtd May 21 '10
	Philippine Republic Presidential Unit Citation Badge	Support of conduct of law enforcement and security operations, humanitarian assistance, disaster relief efforts and socio-economic recovery during the onslaught of Typhoon "Odette"	July 11, 2022	OTAG/APSD General Orders No. 981 dtd July 11, 2022

== See also ==
- Armed Forces of the Philippines Reserve Command
- Philippine Army Reserve Command
- Philippine Air Force Reserve Command
- Philippine Coast Guard Auxiliary
- Cadet rank in the Philippines
