= Merchant Marine Academy =

Merchant Marine Academy may refer to:

- Philippine Merchant Marine Academy
- United States Merchant Marine Academy
