= John B. Lacson Colleges Foundation – Bacolod =

Private maritime college in Bacolod, Philippines

John B. Lacson Colleges Foundation (Bacolod), Inc.
- Former name: Iloilo Maritime Academy
- Motto: We Lead, We Excel, The Lacsonian Legacy
- Type: Private maritime college
- Established: 1974
- Location: Bacolod, Negros Occidental, Philippines; 10°38′19″N 122°56′26″E
- Campus: Urban, 8 ha (20 acres)
- Demonym: Lacsonians
- Nickname: Dolphins
- Sporting affiliations: NOPSSCEA
- Website: www.jblfmu.edu.ph
- Location in the Visayas Location in the Philippines

John B. Lacson Colleges Foundation (Bacolod), Inc. (JBLCF–Bacolod or JBLCFI) is a private maritime college in Bacolod, Negros Occidental, Philippines.

It is a component school of the John B. Lacson Foundation, Inc. System; other component schools being John B. Lacson Foundation Maritime University - Arevalo, Inc., and John B. Lacson Foundation Maritime University - Molo, Inc.

== History ==
In October 1948, Juan Lacson, a Master mariner, together with his brother, Frank Lacson founded the Iloilo Maritime Academy (now John B. Lacson Foundation Maritime University) in Iloilo. In 1972, the Arevalo unit was established, followed by the Bacolod unit in 1974 and the Molo unit two years later. The Puerto del Mar unit in Guimaras was established in 1991.

In 1994, the different units were reorganized into the John B. Lacson Foundation, Inc. System.

In 2015, the unit started the first batch of Junior High School and in 2017, it offered Senior High School with Maritime Tracks.

== See also ==
- List of tertiary schools in Bacolod
