= Ignacio and Maria Arroyo =

Filipino Catholic couple

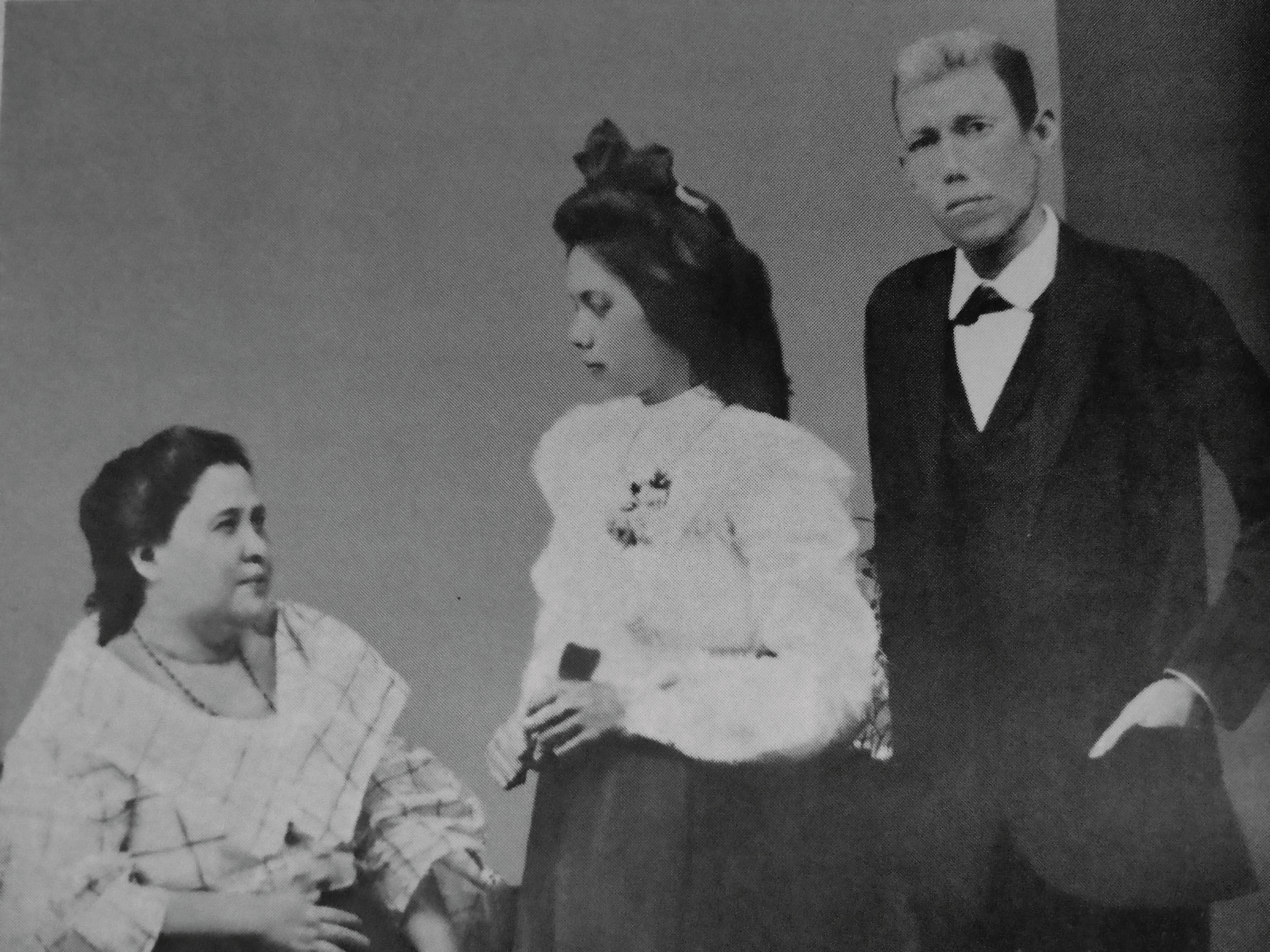
- Mother Rosario with her parents, Ignacio and Maria, before joining the Beaterio de Santa Catalina (c. 1910)
- Born: Ignacio (28 July 1851, in Molo); Maria (15 September 1860, in Molo)
- Died: Ignacio (8 January 1935, aged 83 in Molo); Maria (16 January 1920, aged 59 in Molo)

Ignacio Arroyo y Lacson (28 July 1851 – 8 January 1935) and Maria Regalado Pidal de Arroyo (15 September 1860 – 16 January 1920) were a Filipino Catholic couple, philanthropists and parents of significant Hiligaynon figures including María Beatriz del Rosario Arroyo, a Dominican nun on process for canonization. The couple is remembered for their involvement in numerous charitable, religious and political causes, including the establishment of the Beaterio de Molo.

They are the great-grandparents of former first gentleman, Jose Miguel Arroyo, who is the husband of former president Gloria Macapagal Arroyo.

== Biography ==
=== Early lives ===
Ignacio was born on 28 July 1851 in Molo, Iloilo City to Pedro Arroyo, a self-made businessman and patron of sugar lands in Negros Occidental, and Apolonia Petronilla Lacson, the sister of Lucio Petronilla Lacson. He attended the Colegio de San Juan de Letran, receiving a Bachiller en Artes in 1869. Ignacio would later become a capitan municipal of Molo (equivalent to a municipal mayor) at one time and initiated his family's involvement into politics.

Maria was born on 15 September 1860 in the same city to Melquiades Pidal and Lucia Regalado. Her mother was a member of a prominent Molo family of Spanish mestizo ancestry.

=== Marriage ===
Ignacio married Maria on 23 September 1876 at Santa Ana Roman Catholic Church in Molo. They would later have five children, though only three would survive childhood:

1. José María Arroyo (28 November 1878 – 8 March 1927), became a lawyer and Senator of the Philippines from 1919 until his death in 1927.
2. Mariano Basilio Arroyo (15 April 1885 – 18 May 1948), became a medical doctor and director of St. Paul's Hospital, Iloilo City; elected as Governor of Iloilo in 1928.
3. María Beatriz del Rosario Arroyo (17 February 1884 – 14 June 1957), religious name: María Rosario de la Visitación; founder of the Beaterio de Molo (the Dominican Sisters of the Most Holy Rosary of the Philippines).

=== Family life ===
The Arroyos were known for their piety and generosity. As parents, they were their children's first teachers in Christian values such as compassion for the poor and love of prayer. In the family, Maria took charge of teaching basic catechism, the daily evening recitation of the rosary, and help them become socially aware of the struggles and sufferings of the impoverished.

On Ignacio's part, despite being busy with business interest and investments, he made sure that his children be raised in rigid attention to the Catholic tradition and devotions such visiting frequently the Church and receiving the sacraments, up to the point of creating a private family chapel with the Blessed Sacrament. In terms of education, he chose to send his sons to the Seminario de San Vicente Ferrer in Jaro, Iloilo where they were taught lessons in Latin, philosophy, liturgy, theology and music, and for Rosario to the Colegio de Santa Ana under the guidance of its founders, Jovita and Ramona Avanceña.

When their daughter Rosario expressed her desires to enter the religious life, particularly to the Beaterio de Santa Catalina, the Arroyos at first were surprised but supported the vocation. In 1910, the family accompanied her and as an indication of their full joy, the Arroyos held a celebration outside the convent with the visitors spelling Rosario's name with their chairs.

On the other hand, out of the Arroyos commitment and dedication to the futures of their children, after having graduated from the law school at the University of Santo Tomas in 1903, Jose Maria voyaged to the United States to further his studies. In 1904, Mariano began his studies in medicine at the same university as his older brother.

==== Philippine–American War ====
During the Philippine Revolution, the Arroyos chose to keep a low profile while still sympathetic to the cause of the Comite de Conspiradores, a revolutionary society developed from a deep sense of nationalism and freedom from colonial rule. Always a pious man, Ignacio was seen praying fervently during these times and challenged his family for minimal bloodshed and a quick capitulation on the part of the Spanish regime.

While the ongoing conflict was escalating, Ignacio and Maria decided to keep their two youngest children, Rosario and Mariano, close at hand. He did not allow Mariano to attend school in Manila with Jose Maria, to ensure their safety. The Arroyo children were kept until the war was gone. Though the family were never fully involved in the revolutionary meetings, they were among its supporters and had strong connections with Ramón Avanceña.

==== Beaterio de Molo ====
Happy with Rosario's decision of becoming a nun, Ignacio and Maria began discussing ways in which they could perhaps bring their daughter back to Iloilo. After the numerous inquiries and receiving support from Bishop James Paul McCloskey in 1920, the plan to found a Dominican congregation in Iloilo was realized.

In 1925, the Dominican Sisters of the Most Holy Rosary of the Philippines, spearheaded by Ignacio and Maria's daughter, Rosario, was formally established, with a Motherhouse in Molo, on 24 July 1925. To sustain the congregation's existence, Ignacio prepared a Convenio de Reparticion de Bienes, a legal document that designates the disbursement of properties and estates prior to the formal reading of a will and testament, stating a 25% share of wealth be given to the congregation. This part of their wealth laid the foundations of the new Dominican congregation.

=== Deaths ===
Despite having access to the best medical care in Iloilo and a son who was a medical doctor, Maria died due to sudden terminal illness on 16 January 1920. Ignacio later died on 8 January 1935 at the Arroyos residence on the plaza of Molo at the age of 83. They are both buried in Molo Catholic Cemetery. The local newspaper Makinaugalingon announced his death as follows:

"The deceased Ignacio Arroyo was well known not only in Parian but also by many others, not to mention the genuine generosity he extended to those in need. His philanthropy to the people of Iloilo enabled them to now enjoy the benefit of the school that was constructed that bears his name."
