= Cadet rank in the Philippines =

In the Philippines, Cadet is a rank held by candidate officer during the training to become commissioned officers in their preferred branch of military service.

Philippine Military School for Cadetship	Course	Cadet Rank (OF-D, NATO Code)
Philippine Army Officer Candidate School (PAOCS)	PAOCC (Army Officer Candidate Course); AOPC (Army Officer Preparatory Course)	P2LT (probationary Second Lieutenant) 2LT(Res) (Reserve Second Lieutenant)
Philippine Navy Officer Candidate School (PNOCS)	NOCC (Naval Officer Candidate Course)	PENS (probationary Ensign)
Philippine Air Force Officer Candidate School (PAFOCS)	PAFOCC (Air Force Officer Candidate Course)	P2LT (probationary Second Lieutenant)
Philippine Marine Corps Officer Candidate School (PMCOCS)	NOCC (M) (Marine Officer Basic Course)	P2LT (M) (probationary Second Lieutenant (Marine))
Philippine Coast Guard Officers' Basic Education and Training Center (PCGOBETC)	CGOC (Coast Guard Officers’ Course)	PENS (probationary Ensign)
Reserve Command, Philippine Army (RESCOM, PA)	POTC (Probationary Officer Training Course) Army ROTC (Reserve Officers’ Training Corps)	P2LT (probationary Second Lieutenant) C/2LT to C/COL (Cadet Second Lieutenant, to Cadet Colonel)
Reserve Command, Philippine Navy (RESCOM, PN)	POTC (Probationary Officer Training Course) NROTC (Naval Reserve Officers’ Training Corps)	PENS (probationary Ensign) M/ENS to M/CAPT (Midship[wo]man Ensign, to Midship[wo]man Captain)
Air Force Reserve Command (AFRC)	POTC (Probationary Officer Training Course) PAF ROTC (Philippine Air Force Reserve Officer Training Corps)	P2LT (probationary Second Lieutenant) C/2LT to C/COL (Cadet Second Lieutenant, to Cadet Colonel)
Philippine Military Academy (PMA)	1st Year: Army/Midshipman/Aero CDT 4CL (Plebe); 2nd Year: Army/Midshipman/Aero CDT 3CL (Yearling); 3rd Year: Army/Midshipman/Aero CDT 2CL (Cow); 4th Year: Army/Midshipman/Aero CDT 1CL (Immaculate)	
Philippine National Police Academy (PNPA)	1st Year: Police/Fire/Jail CDT 4CL (Sheep); 2nd Year: Police/Fire/Jail CDT 3CL (Shearer); 3rd Year: Police/Fire/Jail CDT 2CL (Steward); 4th Year: Police/Fire/Jail CDT 1CL (Shepherd)	
Philippine Merchant Marine Academy (PMMA)	1st Year: Midshipman CDT 4CL; 2nd Year: Midshipman CDT 3CL; 3rd Year: Midshipman CDT 2CL; 4th Year: Midshipman CDT 1CL	
Maritime Academy of Asia and the Pacific (MAAP)	1st Year: MIDN/MIDWN 4CL; 2nd Year: MIDN/MIDWN 3CL; 3rd Year: MIDN/MIDWN 2CL; 4th Year: MIDN/MIDWN 1CL	
Aerospace Cadets of the Philippines (ACP)	1st Year: Airman/Airwoman 4th Class; 2nd Year: Airman/Airwoman 3rd Class; 3rd Year: Airman/Airwoman 2nd Class; 4th Year: Airman/Airwoman 1st Class	

== Differentiation between Cadet and Officer Candidate ==
The words cadet and officer candidate are synonymous in referring the rank below second lieutenant. In the Philippines, officer candidates are referred to RESCOM, AFPOCS and PCGOBETC students who had baccalaureate degree, foreign service academies and reserve officer pools undergoing rigorous military training from four months, up to a full year. On the other hand, cadets are referred to students at military schools undergoing four years of military training while completing their college degree.
