= Francisco Felipe Villanueva =

Filipino politician (1867-1923)

The Honourable Francisco Felipe Villanueva
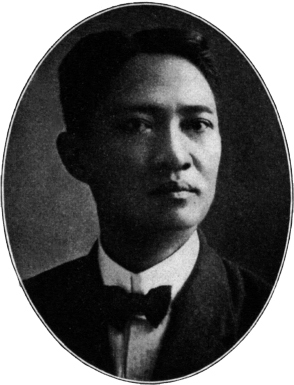
- Official portrait, c. 1917

Senator of the Philippines from the 7th Senatorial District
- In office October 16, 1916 – June 3, 1919
- Preceded by: Position established
- Succeeded by: José María Arroyo

Senate Majority Leader
- In office October 16, 1916 – June 3, 1919
- Senate President: Manuel L. Quezon
- Preceded by: Position established
- Succeeded by: Francisco Enage

Member of the Philippine Assembly from Iloilo's 1st district
- In office October 16, 1909 – October 16, 1916
- Preceded by: Amando Avanceña
- Succeeded by: José María Arroyo

Personal details
- Born: October 10, 1867 Molo, Iloilo, Captaincy General of the Philippines
- Died: August 25, 1923 (aged 55) Manila, Philippine Islands
- Party: Nacionalista
- Other political affiliations: Progresista
- Spouse: Sofia Conlu

Francisco Felipe Villanueva (October 10, 1867 – August 25, 1923) was a Filipino political leader during the Philippine–American War.

== Biography ==
Villanueva was born in the town of Molo, Iloilo (today a district of Iloilo City). He was the youngest of six children of Eusebio and Maria Felipe Villanueva. He studied law in San Juan de Letran, receiving his Bachelor of Arts in April 1883 at a young age of sixteen.

Owing to financial reverses, he interrupted his studies to help his parents in the farm. However, because of his insistence to finish his studies, he gain a small capital to continue by working as a secondary school teacher. He then studied at the University of Santo Tomas. There, he gained his law degree in March 1894.

In June 1894, he returned as a lawyer to his home province, where he practiced his profession.

Villanueva married Sofia Conlu and fathered 12 children.

== Political career ==
Villanueva served as the Visayan member to the Malolos Congress, where he conferred with General Emilio Aguinaldo and Apolinario Mabini to assure that the Visayas would be included in the nascent First Philippine Republic.

Villanueva also co-owned and founded the newspaper El Pais and El Tiempo. He was subjected to a court martial by the American military government of Iloilo owing to an article published in El Pais, which was a reproduction of an article from another newspaper in Cebu, El Nueva Dia. He was tried on counts of supporting "revolutionary ideas".

In 1904, he became the registrar of titles for the province of Iloilo. In 1907, he fully dedicated his career to politics under the Insular Government. Villanueva subsequently served two terms as representative of the first district of Iloilo from 1909 to 1916, and as one of the first senators (alongside Jose Altavas) of the seventh senatorial district comprising Iloilo, Capiz and Romblon from 1916 to 1919. He also served as Senate majority floor leader during the Fourth Legislature in 1916–1919.

As a senator, Villanueva was one of the respected members of the Nacionalista Party. In 1917, he was chairman of the Senate Committee on Rules and was a member of the Senate committees on National Security and Finance.

== Death ==
Villanueva suffered a fatal heart attack at his Senate office in the Legislative Building in Manila on August 25, 1923.
