= Amando Avanceña =

Filipino lawyer and politician (1879-1953)

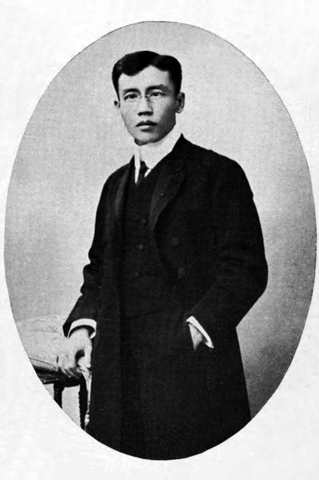
- Avanceña as a member of the Philippine Assembly, c. 1908

Member of the Philippine Assembly from Iloilo
- In office October 16, 1907 – October 16, 1909
- Preceded by: position established
- Succeeded by: Francisco Felipe Villanueva
- Constituency: 1st district
- In office October 16, 1912 – June 30, 1914
- Preceded by: Espiridion Guanco
- Succeeded by: Tiburcio Lutero
- Constituency: 4th district

6th Governor of Iloilo
- In office 1914–1916
- Preceded by: Adriano Hernández
- Succeeded by: Gregorio Yulo

Personal details
- Born: February 6, 1879 Molo, Iloilo, Captaincy General of the Philippines
- Died: August 1, 1953 (aged 74) Iloilo City, Iloilo, Philippines
- Relations: Ramón Avanceña (brother)
- Education: University of Santo Tomas

Amando Avanceña y Quiosay (February 6, 1879 — August 1, 1953) was a Filipino lawyer, hacendero, and politician. He became a member of the Philippine Assembly from 1907 to 1909 and 1912 to 1914 and served as governor of Iloilo from 1914 to 1916.

He was also president of the La Confederacion de Asociaciones y Plantadores de Caña Dulce, Inc. during the 1920s and 1930s.

== Biography ==
He was born in Molo, Iloilo on February 6, 1879. He studied at Colegio Seminario de Jaro from 1893 to 1897 and entered the University of Santo Tomas.

When the Philippine Revolution broke out, he served in the revolutionary army. Upon the establishment of the civil government by the Americans, he studied law in the Colegio de Abogados de Manila in 1902. In 1904, he was admitted to the bar.

As a political activist, he had been a contributor to La Revolucion, a newspaper published during the war against Spain, and El Pais, a newspaper suspended by the American military.

In 1907, he was elected to the Philippine Assembly representing Iloilo's 1st district. As an assemblyman, he was a member on the committees on elections, public lands, state mines, and forestry. He served until 1909. He was again reelected in 1912, representing Iloilo's 4th district. He held this position until his resignation in 1914.

In 1914, he was provincial governor of Iloilo.

=== Post-political life ===
==== Confederation of Associations and Planters of Sugar Cane ====
In 1924, four planter groups from Talisay, Bacolod, Ma-ao, and Isabela created the La Confederacion de Asociaciones y Plantadores de Caña Dulce, Inc. With a subsidy of two centavos per picul of sugar milled, this organization attracted more planter groups from other major milling areas in Negros and Pampanga. The confederation, through the help of Avanceña as its president and chief spokesman, worked to secure better loan terms and lobbied in Manila and Washington.

During the post-1921 Philippine financial crisis, prosperity during the central era did not create harmony in the sugar industry, as profit distribution caused tensions. Planters saw stockholders at sugar centrals financed by the Philippine National Bank (PNB) making high dividends while they were in debt and believed they deserved a larger share. Hacenderos, mainly tied to thirty-year contracts, aimed to enhance their situation sooner. Due to this, the hacenderos pressured the Philippine Legislature in mid-1929 seeking to increase their share of milled sugar from 55 percent to 60 percent. Within a year, they proposed a legislative bill to change this, but it was narrowly defeated due to Senate President Manuel L. Quezon's constitutional objections.

Avanceña proposed that the government should make the bank's sugar centrals offer higher participation voluntarily. However, the PNB declined this proposal. The bank's sugar centralists argued that landowners, rather than planter-lessees, would benefit from this change. As a result of the hacenderos' defeat, they threatened to vote for the opposing Democrata Party and to decrease cane production.

==== Philippine Independence ====
During 1930s, there were widespread discussions on Philippine independence among economic and political leaders regarding its economic impact on the islands. Avanceña declared in 1933 that the United States should give the Philippines complete independence stating:

...we ask, that America concede to the Philippines its independence without any period of transition, although this may mean that we have to abandon the planting of sugar cane and must produce other products; but such independence should be real, in other words, once she has granted independence to the Philippines, the United States should not have any military or other reservations within the territory of the Philippine Islands.

— Amando Avanceña, Statement from The Mixed Mission (April 23, 1933)
