= José María Arroyo =

Filipino politician

The Honourable José María Arroyo
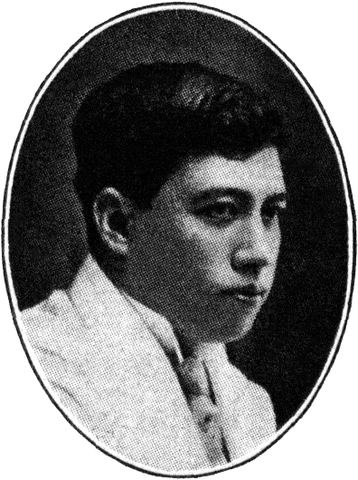
- Arroyo as member of the Philippine House of Representatives, c. 1917

Senator of the Philippines from the 7th Senatorial District
- In office 1919 – March 8, 1927 Serving with Jose Altavas; Jose Hontiveros
- Preceded by: Francisco Felipe Villanueva
- Succeeded by: José B. Ledesma

Member of the House of Representatives of the Philippine Islands from Iloilo's 1st district
- In office 1916–1919
- Preceded by: Francisco Felipe Villanueva
- Succeeded by: José Evangelista

Personal details
- Born: José María Lacson Arroyo y Pidal; 1875 Iloilo, Iloilo, Captaincy General of the Philippines
- Died: March 8, 1927 (aged 51–52) Liguria, Italy
- Party: Nacionalista
- Spouse: Jesusa Araneta Lacson
- Children: 7
- Parent: Ignacio and Maria Arroyo

José María Lacson Arroyo y Pidal (1875 – March 8, 1927) was a Filipino politician. He served as the representative of the first district of Iloilo from 1916 to 1919, and as a senator representing the seventh senatorial district from 1919 until his death in Italy on March 8, 1927 from heart attack while on vacation.

Jose Maria Lacson Arroyo y Pidal was the son of philanthropists Ignacio Lacson Arroyo Sr. and Maria Regalado Pidal de Arroyo; the founders of the Beaterio de Molo. His wife, Jesusa Araneta Lacson, was the eldest child of Philippine Revolutionary hero, Gen. Aniceto Lacson of Negros Occidental, and his grandchildren are First Gentleman Jose Miguel Arroyo, and Iggy Arroyo. His sister María Beatriz del Rosario Arroyo y Pidal, was a Dominican nun on process for canonization while his brother Mariano Pidal Arroyo became the 11th civil governor of Iloilo province.

== The Arroyo Fountain ==
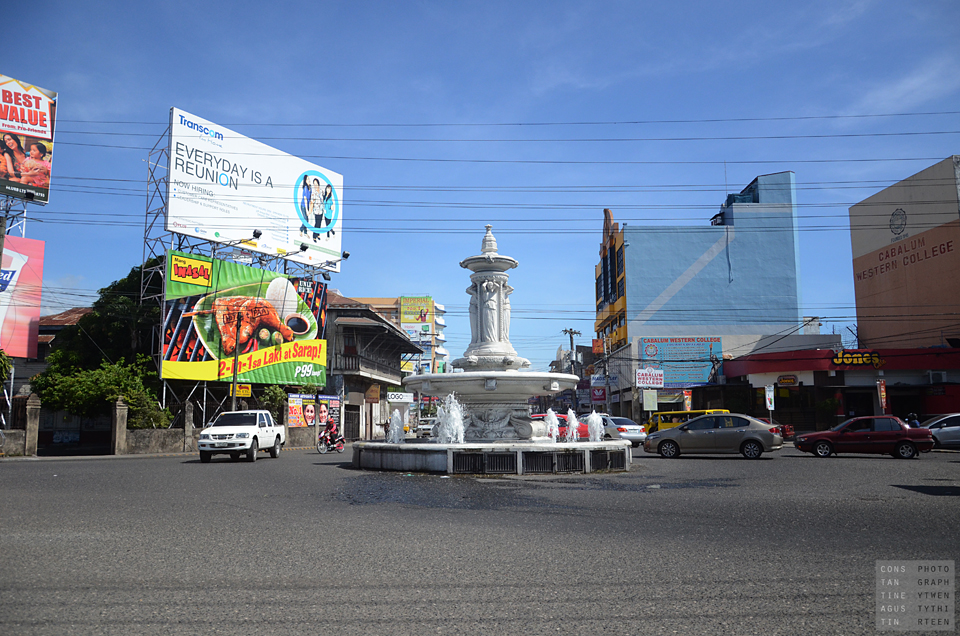
The Arroyo Fountain

The Arroyo Fountain in front of the Iloilo Provincial Capitol and built in 1927 was named after him in recognition for his efforts of authoring Republic Act No. 3222, a law that establishes the Iloilo Metropolitan Waterworks in 1925. It stands on Kilometer Zero as the benchmark to measure distances from Iloilo City to other points in Panay Island, Western Visayas region and other places in the Philippines.
