= John B. Lacson Foundation Maritime University =

Private university in Iloilo CIty, Philippines

- Pamantasang Pangmarino ng John B. Lacson Foundation (Filipino)
- Former names: Iloilo Maritime Academy, John B. Lacson Colleges Foundation
- Motto: We Lead, We Excel. The Lacsonian Legacy.
- Type: Private non-sectarian secondary and higher education institution
- Established: 1948; 78 years ago
- Founder: Juan Bautista Lacson
- Chairman: Mary Lou Arcelo
- CEO, Chairman of Executive Council: Ronald Raymond Sebastian
- Administrative staff: ~1000
- Students: ~11,000+
- Location: M.H. del Pilar Street, Molo, Iloilo City, Iloilo, Philippines; 10°41′55″N 122°33′11″E
- Campus: Santo Niño Sur, Arevalo, Iloilo City; MH del Pilar St, Molo, Iloilo City (Head office); Alijis Rd., Bacolod (as JBLCF–Bacolod)
- Demonym: Lacsonians
- Colors: Navy blue, yellow, white
- Nickname: Dolphins
- Mascot: Dolphin
- Website: www.jblfmu.edu.ph
- Location in the Visayas Location in the Philippines

The John B. Lacson Foundation Maritime University (JBLFMU, referred to colloquially by locals as John B) is a private maritime institution based in Molo, Iloilo City, Philippines. It is the first maritime school in the Visayas and Mindanao, first private maritime education and training institution in the Philippines, and the first maritime institution in the country to obtain the accreditation of DNV (Det Norske Veritas).

It consists of four major academic components provided by the John B. Lacson Foundation, Inc. System; the JBLFMU-Arevalo, JBLCF-Bacolod, JBLFMU-Molo, and JBLF-Training Center — with JBLFMU-Molo being the head office.

It is the first maritime institution to earn the Philippine Association of Colleges and Universities Commission on Accreditation (PACUCOA) Level IV re-accredited status. It is also the first to establish a maritime high school in the Philippines; the first to publish a maritime education review; the first to be granted the Expanded Tertiary Education Equivalency Program (ETEEAP) for Maritime Education in the country; and the first maritime university in the Philippines to become a member of the esteemed International Association of Maritime Universities (IAMU). It has also gained the international accreditation, ISO 9001 Bureau Veritas Certification.

== History ==
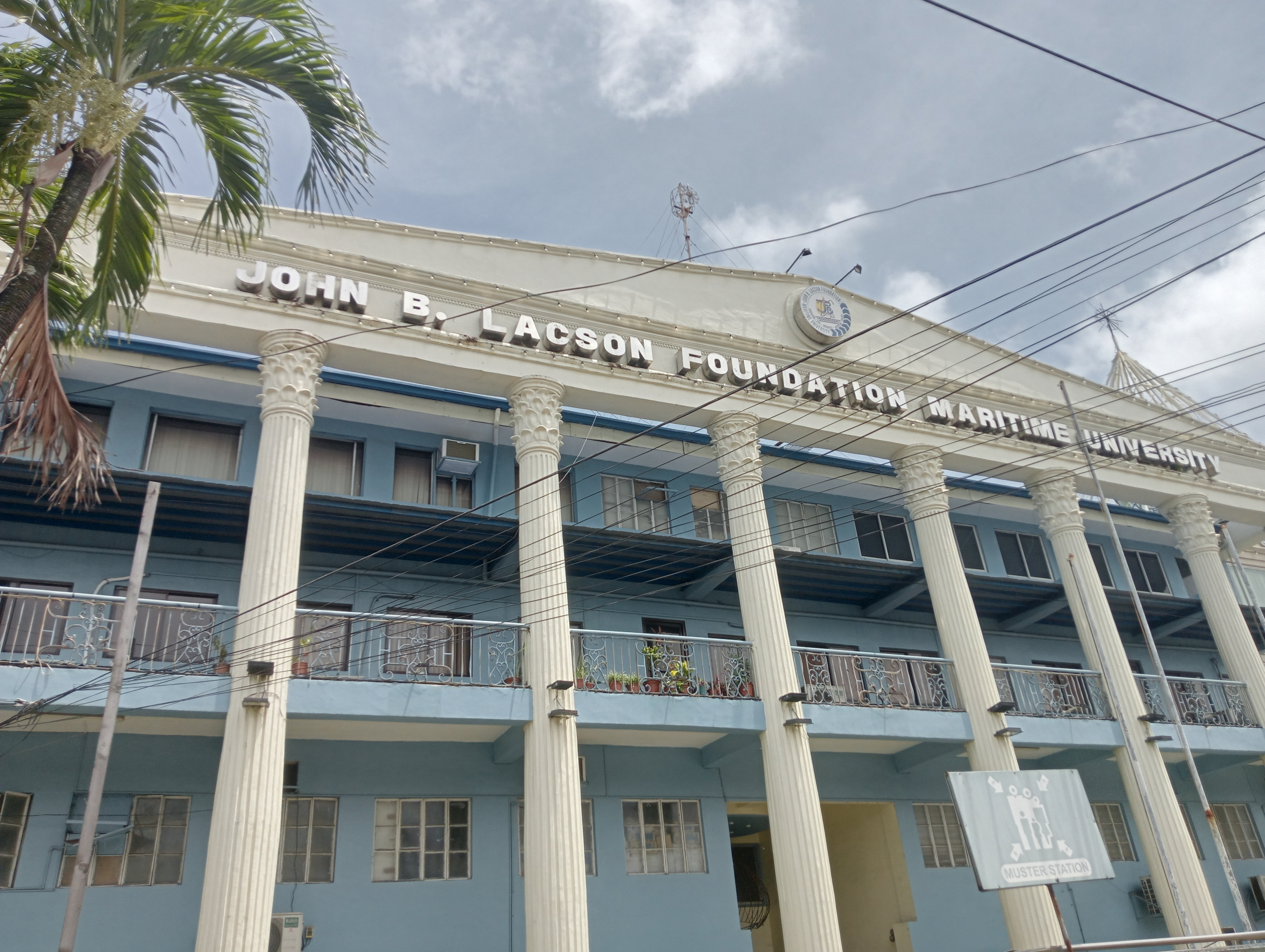
JBLFMU administrative building in Molo

The John B. Lacson Foundation Maritime University was founded by Capt. Juan Bautista Lacson, a distinguished Filipino sea captain who is of the prominent Lacson family, graduated from Philippine Nautical School (presently the Philippine Merchant Marine Academy) class of 1920, a talented and hard working master mariner in his time. It first started with a review school for marine officers in May 1931 before the establishment of the Iloilo Maritime Academy in 1948.

When it first opened with 60 enrollees, the academy offered a two-year regular course for cadets in the nautical profession leading to the acquisition of a Third Mate license for merchant marine officers as well as reserved naval officers in the Philippine Navy. By the time it was granted permit to operate in 1949, the school had 150 junior students and 54 seniors.

The following year, it was granted government recognition and registered as a non-stock corporation by the Securities and Exchange Commission. To accommodate its growing population, the academy transferred locations a couple of times before settling along Muelle Loney Street, Iloilo City in 1953. The height of activism, strikes, pickets and labor unrest in the country in 1971 did not spare the Iloilo Maritime Academy from the fury of the times.

In 1972, there was a change in leadership of the institution in the person of the Capt. Lacson’s youngest daughter, Mary Lou Lacson, who was welcomed and accepted even by union members. It was this year that marked the beginning of the expansion of IMA to JBLCF, i.e., JBLFMU - Arevalo in 1973, JBLCF – Bacolod in 1974, JBLFMU – Molo in 1976, and JBLF – Training Center in 1995. Also, the Puerto del Mar unit in Guimaras was established in 1991.

In 1994, the different units were reorganized into the John B. Lacson Foundation, Inc. System.

== Logo ==
The name John B. Lacson Foundation was adopted in 1985 by the institution to give honor and legacy to its founder, Capt. Juan B. Lacson, when it was converted from a stock corporation to a foundation. In 1985, a contest was conducted among the members of the institution for a new logo due to the conversion of Iloilo Maritime Academy into JBLCF. Midshipman Nelson Reyes of the Marine Engineering Department won the logo making contest. With slight revisions, it was adopted as the official JBLCF logo and later incorporated in the new logo when it was elevated to a university.

== Campuses ==
John B. Lacson Foundation, Inc. System consists of four major academic components.

School	Location	Established	Notes
John B. Lacson Foundation Maritime University – Arevalo Administrator: Capt. Alfred G. Espinosa, PH.D	Arevalo, Iloilo City	1973	Initially opened for the Deck Officer's Course
John B. Lacson Colleges Foundation – Bacolod Administrator: Engr. Roberto Neal Sobrejuanite	Bacolod, Negros Occidental	1974	
John B. Lacson Foundation Maritime University – Molo Administrator: Mr. Roberto O. Parcia	Molo, Iloilo City	1976	Initially opened for Maritime Engineering
John B. Lacson Foundation – Training Center Administrator: Capt. Luis G. Evidente	Molo, Iloilo City	1995	JBLF Training Center main office is located at the JBLFMU-Molo campus while the practicum exercises are conducted at Puerto del Mar (PDM), Nueva Valencia, Guimaras.

== Academic programs ==
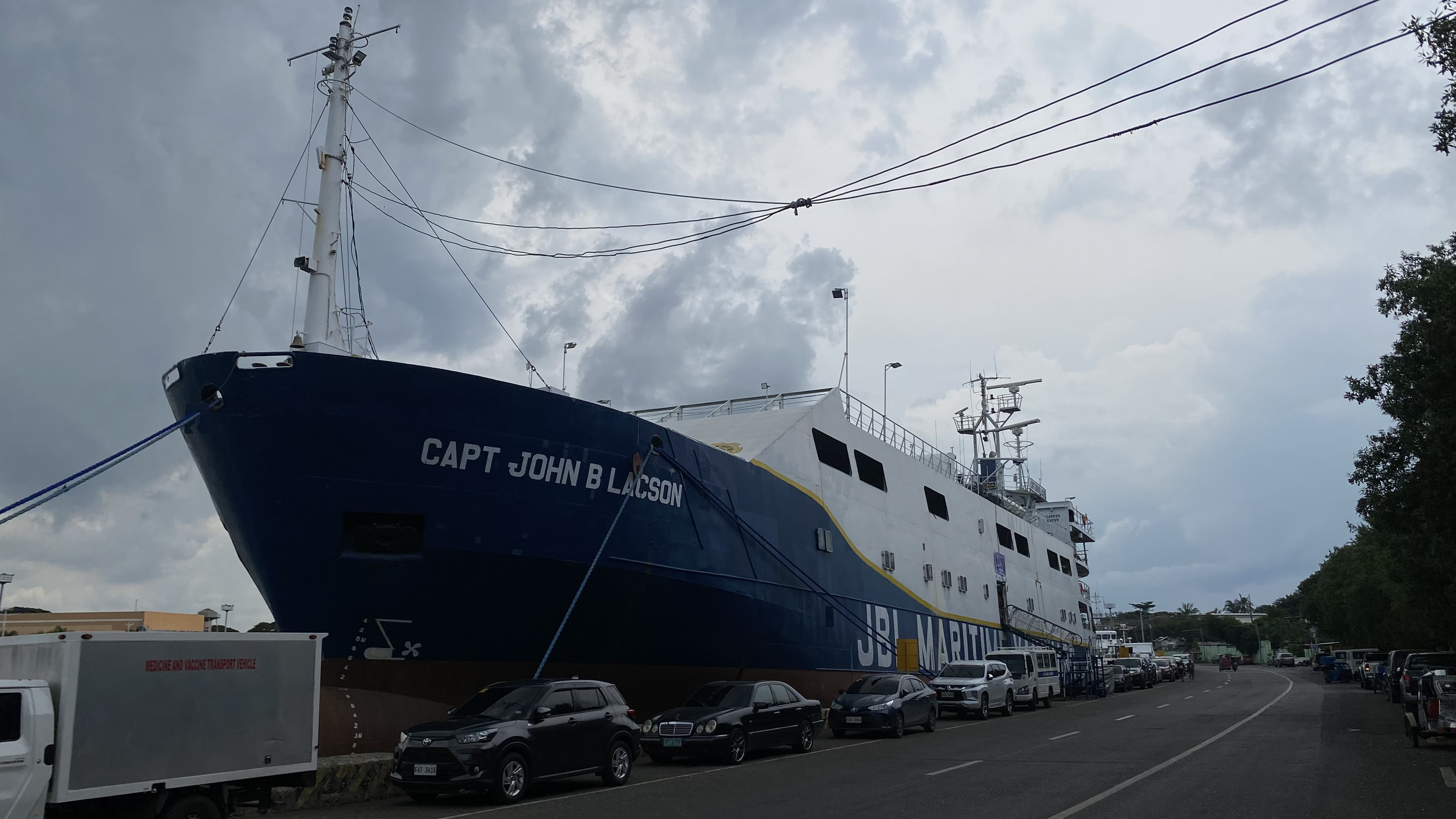
Capt. John B. Lacson training ship on Muelle Loney Street along the Iloilo River

=== Graduate school ===
JBLFMU's graduate school is located in JBLFMU-Arevalo. All master’s programs are also offered via Distance Education. Extension Class Centers are located in Bacolod City, Davao City, and Mandaluyong.

=== Maritime high school ===
In 1990 the university established the first and only maritime high school in the Philippines. Located in JBLFMU-Molo, students are given with basic seamanship subjects and are given a chance to experience life on board a ship through a navigational trip on their 2nd, 3rd, and 4th year in school. The navigational trips include various places including Manila, Bacolod, Cebu, and Cagayan Oro.

=== Senior high ===
JBLFMU-Arevalo, JBLCF-Bacolod, and JBLFMU-Molo were all senior high ready as of 2017.
