= María Beatriz del Rosario Arroyo =

Filipino Dominican nun

Venerable Maria Rosario of the Visitation OP
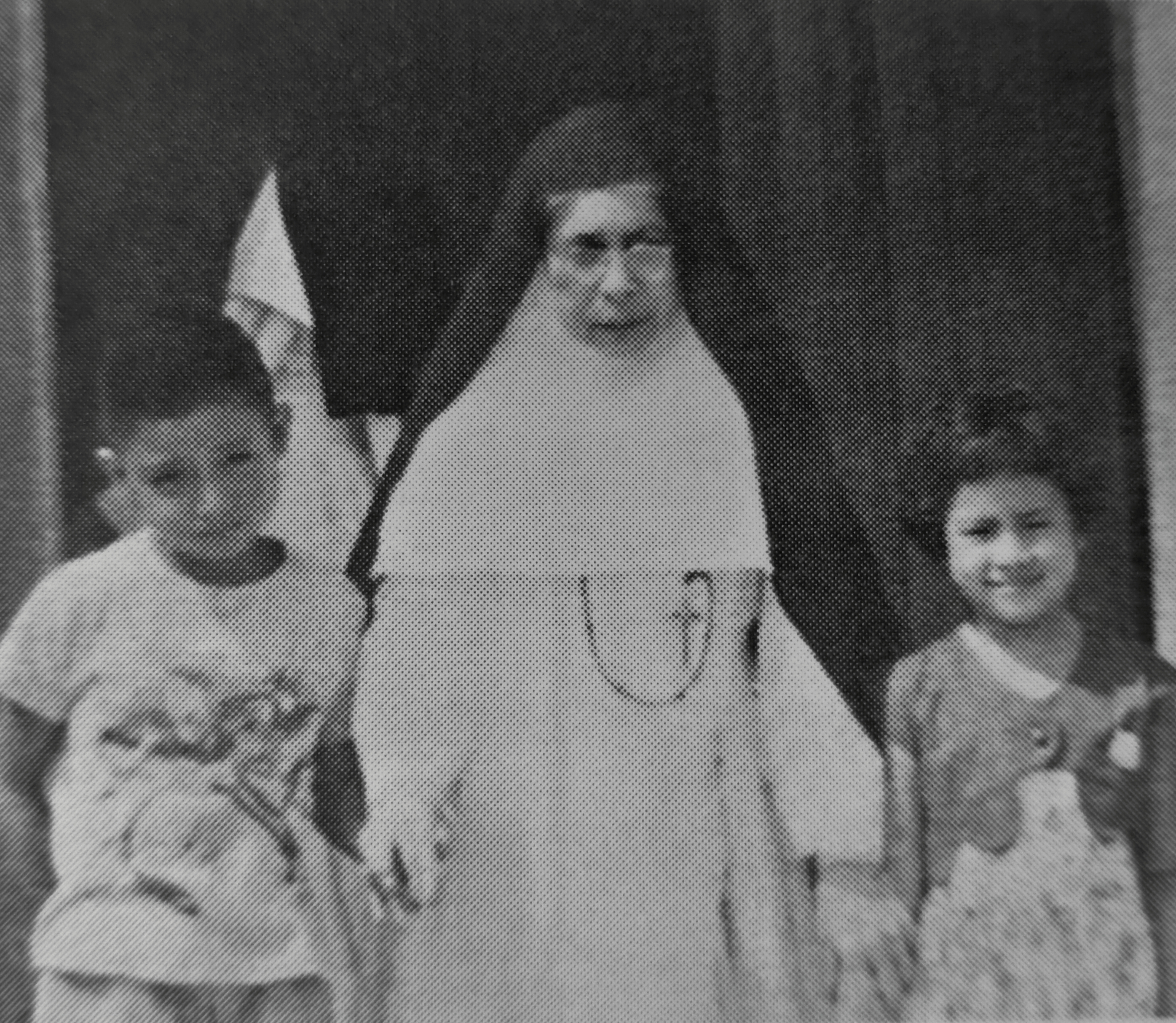
- Mother Rosario with children
- Born: María Beatriz del Rosario Arroyo y Pidal; February 17, 1884; Molo, Iloilo, Captaincy General of the Philippines
- Died: June 14, 1957 (aged 73); Molo, Iloilo City, Philippines

María Beatriz del Rosario Arroyo y Pidal, religious name María Rosario of the Visitation, February 17, 1884 – June 14, 1957) was a Filipino nun and the founder of the Dominican Sisters of the Most Holy Rosary of the Philippines (Dominican Sisters of Molo).

== Early life and education ==
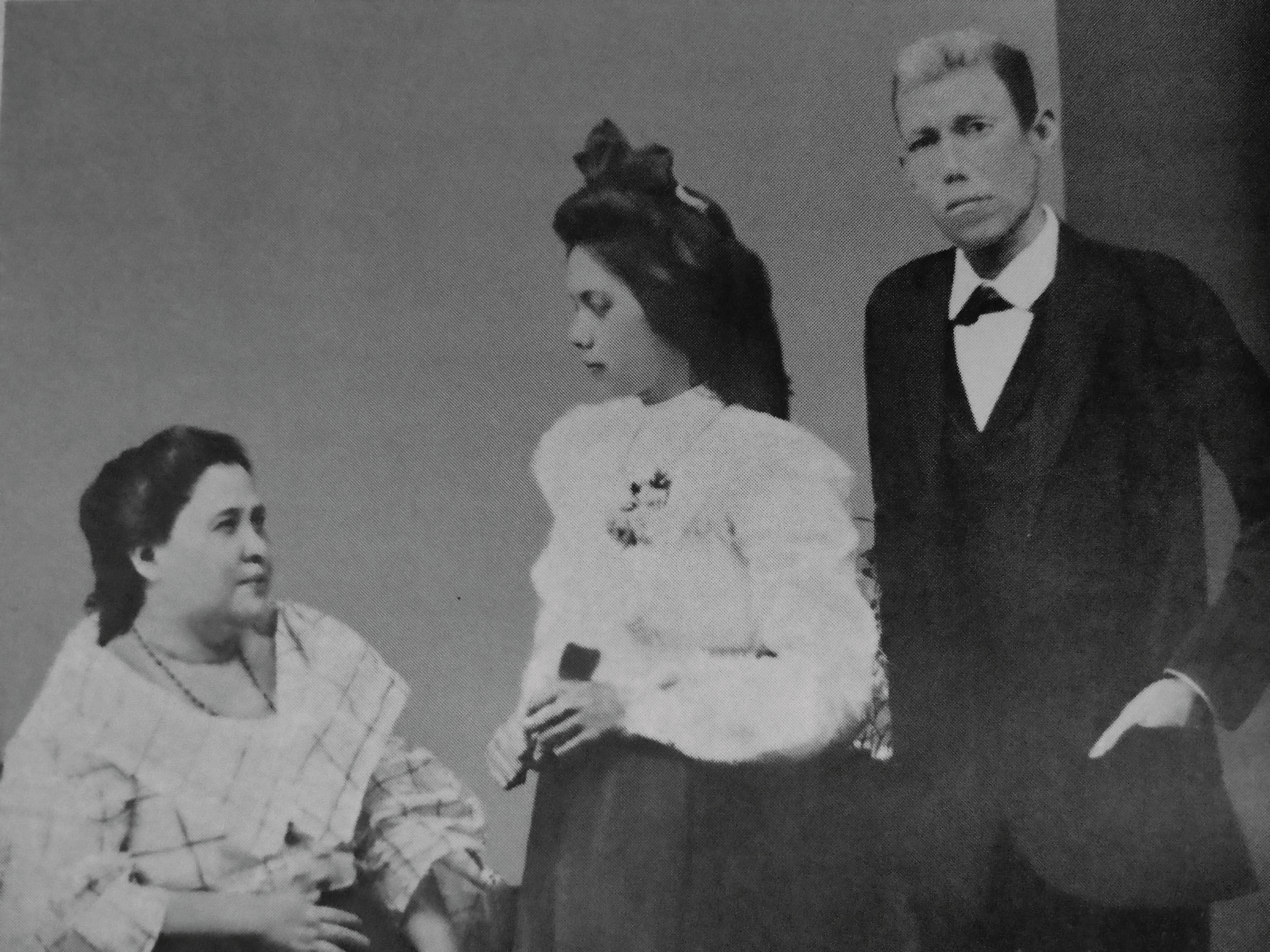
María Beatriz del Rosario with her parents, Ignacio and Maria, before joining the Beaterio de Santa Catalina

Arroyo was born on Feb. 17, 1884, in Molo, Iloilo to a pious couple, Ignacio Arroyo and Doña María Pidal, as the only daughter of three children. Her two brothers were José María Arroyo and Mariano Arroyo. José became a senator in 1919, while Mariano was governor of Iloilo in 1928. She is a grand-aunt of former First Gentleman José Miguel Tuason Arroyo, husband of Gloria Macapagal-Arroyo, the fourteenth president of the Philippines, congresswoman of Pampanga and 21st House Speaker. Rosario's closest relative, niece Mariquita Arroyo Tuell Richmer (daughter of Mariano Arroyo) died in 2014 in Indiana, USA.

She was christened María Beatriz del Rosario at the Santa Ana Church in Molo on February 20, 1884, by Agapito Buenaflor. A noteworthy tradition of her family was almsgiving; Arroyo thus participated in the corporal works of mercy from an early age. Unspoilt by her affluent upbringing as a member of the aristocracy, she preferred a simple life and reportedly donated her inheritance to the congregation upon becoming an heiress.

Arroyo first attended classes at the Colegio de Santa Ana, a private school in Molo. In preparation for her first communion, she was transferred to Colegio de San José administered by the Daughters of Charity. She stayed at the Colegio until she finished her elementary education.

== Career and death ==
The young Arroyo joined the religious life in the Beaterio de Sta. Catalina in Manila and made her profession on January 3, 1914. She was taught at the Beaterio of Manila and in Lingayen. She then became a nun in the Dominican Order.

With the help of two other Dominican nuns, Arroyo would eventually found the Beaterio de Molo, presently known as Dominican Sisters of the Most Holy Rosary of the Philippines, a Filipino congregation, on February 18, 1927. Elected the First Superioress General of the Congregation at the Congregation's First General Chapter of January 3–6, 1953, she had 32 years of service.

Madre Sayong or Madre Maestra, as Arroyo was known, died on June 14, 1957.

== Legacy ==
With a present membership of over 250, Arroyo's congregation runs multiple schools, colleges and retreat houses. Nationally, the order has professed sisters in the archdioceses of Capiz, Jaro, and Manila, as well as the dioceses of Bacolod, Imus, Mati, San José de Antique and Tagum.

The congregation also has an overseas presence in the Diocese of Chalan Kanoa in the Commonwealth of the Northern Mariana Islands; the Roman Catholic Diocese of Ngong in Kenya; at Convitto San Tommaso (Convitto Internazionale San Tommaso d'Aquino) in Rome; the Parish of San Quirico d'Orcia in Valdorcia, Tuscany in the Archdiocese of Siena-Colle di Val d'Elsa-Montalcino (Italy); and in the Archdiocese of San Francisco and the Diocese of Honolulu in the United States.

== Beatification process ==
Rosario of the Visitation's portrait on prayer cards

Arroyo is currently in consideration for sainthood in the Roman Catholic Church with several miracles being investigated purportedly attributed to her.

On July 28, 2009, Archbishop Angel Lagdameo issued an edict declaring that he is initiating the "diocesan process for the Cause of the Canonization of the Servant of God Mother Rosario Arroyo de la Visitacion which was officially opened on the 7th day of October 2009 at the parish church of St. Anne, Molo, Iloilo City." It was spearheaded by the Congregation of the Dominican Sisters of the Most Holy Rosary of the Philippines (originally Beaterio de Molo) based in Molo, Iloilo. Arroyo founded this congregation in 1925. The cause for the canonization of Arroyo was initiated by the Mother Rosario Arroyo Commission (MRAC) headed by former Superior General, Visitacion Alecto. Later, Samson S. Silloriquez, was constituted as the postulator who petitioned Archbishop Angel N. Lagdameo to decree the initiation of the diocesan process for Arroyo's beatification and canonization.

On June 11, 2019, the decree of heroic virtue was promulgated, giving her the title venerable.

== See also ==
- List of Filipinos venerated in the Catholic Church
