= Juan B. Lacson =

Filipino sea captain

Juan Bautista Lacson
- Born: May 9, 1898; Silay, Negros Occidental, Captaincy General of the Philippines
- Died: June 15, 1992 (aged 94); Iloilo City, Philippines
- Other name: John B. Lacson
- Occupations: Sea captain, Maritime pilot

Juan Bautista Jocson Lacson (May 9, 1898 – June 15, 1992), commonly known as John B. Lacson, was a Filipino sea captain who founded the John B. Lacson Foundation Maritime University in Iloilo City, the first private maritime education and training institution in the Philippines.

== Biography ==
Capt. Lacson was born on May 9, 1898, in Silay, Negros Occidental. He studied high school at Silliman University in Dumaguete, Negros Oriental and took an Associate in Applied Science in Nautical Science at the Philippine Nautical School in Manila.

During World War II, Capt. Lacson became a U.S. Coast Guard Lieutenant Junior Grade in San Francisco. He commanded the U.S. Army fuel and supply ship FS-171. He later became a U.S. citizen and adopted the name John B. Lacson. He was the later promoted to lieutenant commander and was the commanding officer of the CG-68009, the former naval vessel Bataan in San Juan, Puerto Rico.

After his Coast Guard service ended, he went home to the Philippines and founded the first maritime school in the Visayas, Iloilo Maritime Academy (now known as John B. Lacson Foundation Maritime University) in 1948. He also served as a harbor pilot in Iloilo City until his death on June 15, 1992.
