= Jose Miguel Arroyo =

Filipino lawyer and former First Gentleman of the Philippines (born 1945)

José Miguel Arroyo
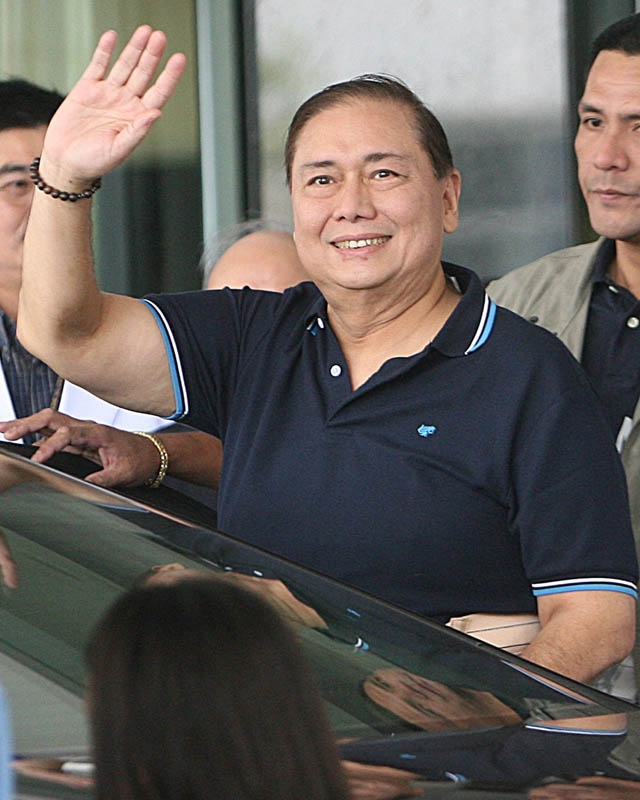
- Arroyo in 2010

First Gentleman of the Philippines
- In role January 20, 2001 – June 30, 2010
- President: Gloria Macapagal Arroyo
- Preceded by: Loi Estrada (First Lady)
- Succeeded by: Liza Araneta Marcos (Note: Arroyo was the last to assume the role of First Gentleman, which would be the male equivalent of First Lady, in a regular capacity. President Benigno Aquino III was a bachelor, while President Rodrigo Duterte had Honeylet Avanceña as his unmarried partner; Avanceña never held the role of First Lady under a regular capacity. Because of these, the role was vacant for 12 years from June 30, 2010 to June 30, 2022.) (First Lady; in 2022)

Personal details
- Born: José Miguel Tuason Arroyo; June 27, 1945 (age 81) Negros Occidental, Philippine Commonwealth
- Spouse: Gloria Macapagal (m. 1968)
- Relations: Ignacio Tuason Arroyo Jr. (brother); Marilou Arroyo-Lesaca (sister); Diosdado Macapagal (father-in-law)
- Children: 3, including Mikey and Dato
- Parent(s): Ignacio Lacson Arroyo; Lourdes Zaragoza Tuason
- Education: Ateneo de Manila University
- Profession: Lawyer

José Miguel Tuason Arroyo (Tagalog pronunciation: [ɐˈɾɔjɔ]; born June 27, 1945), also known as Mike Arroyo, is a former First Gentleman of the Philippines. A lawyer by profession, he is the husband of former president and house speaker Gloria Macapagal Arroyo. He is the first and, to date, only male spouse of a president of the Philippines, Speaker of the House of Representatives.

== Family and personal life ==
Arroyo's great-great-grandparents were Ignacio Arroyo and Doña María Pidal, who had three children: Maria Beatriz del Rosario Arroyo (an Ilongga nun who is a candidate for sainthood in the Catholic Church); José María Arroyo; and Mariano Arroyo. José María became a senator in 1919, whilst Mariano was elected governor of Iloilo province in Western Visayas region in 1928. Senator José María Arroyo and his wife, Jesusa Araneta-Lacson of Negros Occidental; who is the daughter of Gen. Aniceto Lacson, produced seven children, one of whom was his father, Ignacio Lacson Arroyo.

The younger Ignacio subsequently married Lourdes Zaragoza Tuason and had two sons and a daughter, Jose Miguel, his brother, Ignacio Jr., and sister Maria Lourdes.

Jose Miguel is married to Maria Gloria Macaraeg Macapagal in 1968, and the couple has three children: Juan Miguel ("Mikey"); Evangelina Lourdes ("Luli"); and Diosdado ("Dato"). Luli married former investment banker and director of the Ayala Foundation, J. Aloysius "Luigi" Bernas on November 5, 2008.

== Public life ==
In the 1960s, Arroyo was the publisher of the teen-oriented magazine Teenstone, a publication set up by guitarist Ramon Jacinto and his group the Rioteers.

Arroyo's major project whilst occupying the role of the First Gentleman was the sourcing of funds for the training of Filipino athletes in preparation for the 2005 Southeast Asian Games, for which the Philippines was the host nation.

=== Health ===
The former First Gentleman's fragile health has been a public affair since April 9, 2007, when he underwent open heart surgery after being diagnosed with an aortic aneurysm. The procedure lasted for ten hours but was considered successful, and 22 days after the operation, Arroyo had almost completely recovered and was discharged from hospital. However, Arroyo's health since 2007 has been described as "questionable", with serious abdominal pains resulting in an emergency landing in 2008, and another heart-related hospital visit in 2010.

=== Controversies ===
During the period his wife's rule, Arroyo became the subject of a congressional investigation on allegations of corruption, including those by his wife's administration, led him to opt for voluntary exile as a management technique.

== Awards and decorations ==
- Grand Cordon of the Order of the Paulownia Flowers (Japan, 2002)
- Knight Grand Cross of the Order of Isabella the Catholic (Spain, 2007)

== Notes ==
Honorary titles
Preceded by Loi Estrada as First Lady	First Gentleman of the Philippines; 2001–2010	Vacant Title next held by Louise Araneta-Marcos as First Lady
