= Philippine Merchant Marine Academy =

Public college in Zambales, Philippines

- Akademiya sa Bapor Pangkalakalan ng Pilipinas (Filipino)
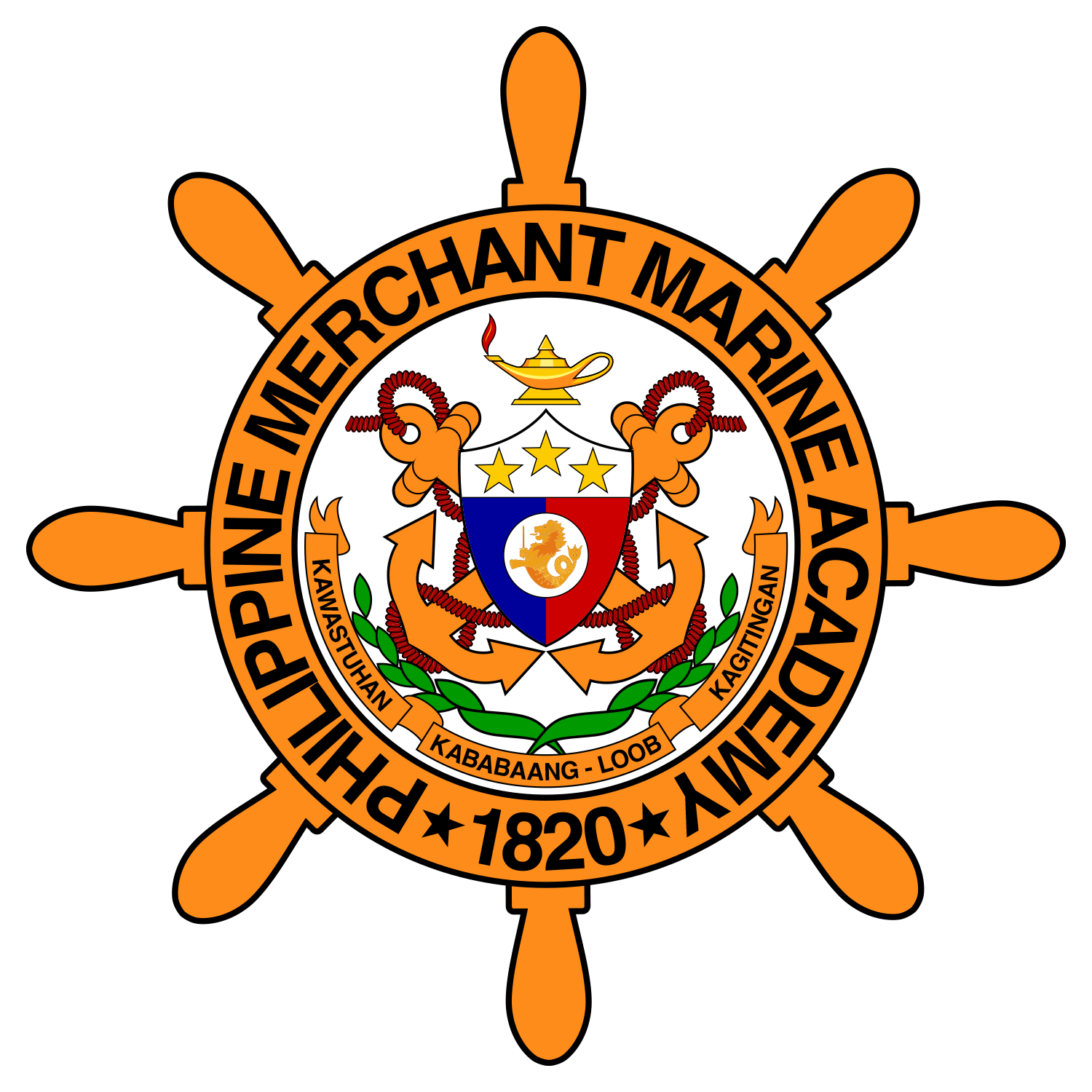
- Former names: Escuela Nautica de Manila (1820–1899); Nautical School of the Philippine Islands (1899); Philippine Nautical School (1963)
- Motto: Kawastuhan, Kababaang-loob, Kagitingan (Filipino)
- Motto in English: Righteousness, Humility, Courage
- Type: State College Marine and Quasi-Military Academy
- Established: April 5, 1820; 206 years ago Intramuros, Manila
- Founder: Francisco Castañeda
- Budget: ₱300,266,000 (2021)
- Chairman: Commissioner Ronald Lapat Adamat, Ph.D, P.D.
- Superintendent: RAdm. Joel Y. Abutal, MM, MSc
- Dean: Ma. Nissa C. Espiritu (Dean of Graduate School); Manny Isla Ching, MSc Dean of College of Marine Transportation; Nayan E. Guimpayan (Dean of College of Marine Engineering)
- Location: San Narciso, Zambales, Philippines; 15°00′00″N 120°04′22″E
- Campus: Urban 602,292 square metres (60.2292 ha)
- Colors: Blue , Gold and White
- Website: www.pmma.edu.ph
- Location in Luzon Location in the Philippines

Philippine Merchant Marine Academy (PMMA) is a maritime higher education institution operated by the Philippine government in San Narciso, Zambales. Students are called midshipmen but are often also referred to as cadets. Upon graduation, cadets are commissioned as ensigns (second lieutenants) in the Philippine Navy Reserve and have the option to join the merchant marine, regular force of the Philippine Navy and Philippine Coast Guard.

== Curriculum ==
Philippine Merchant Marine Academy Training Center

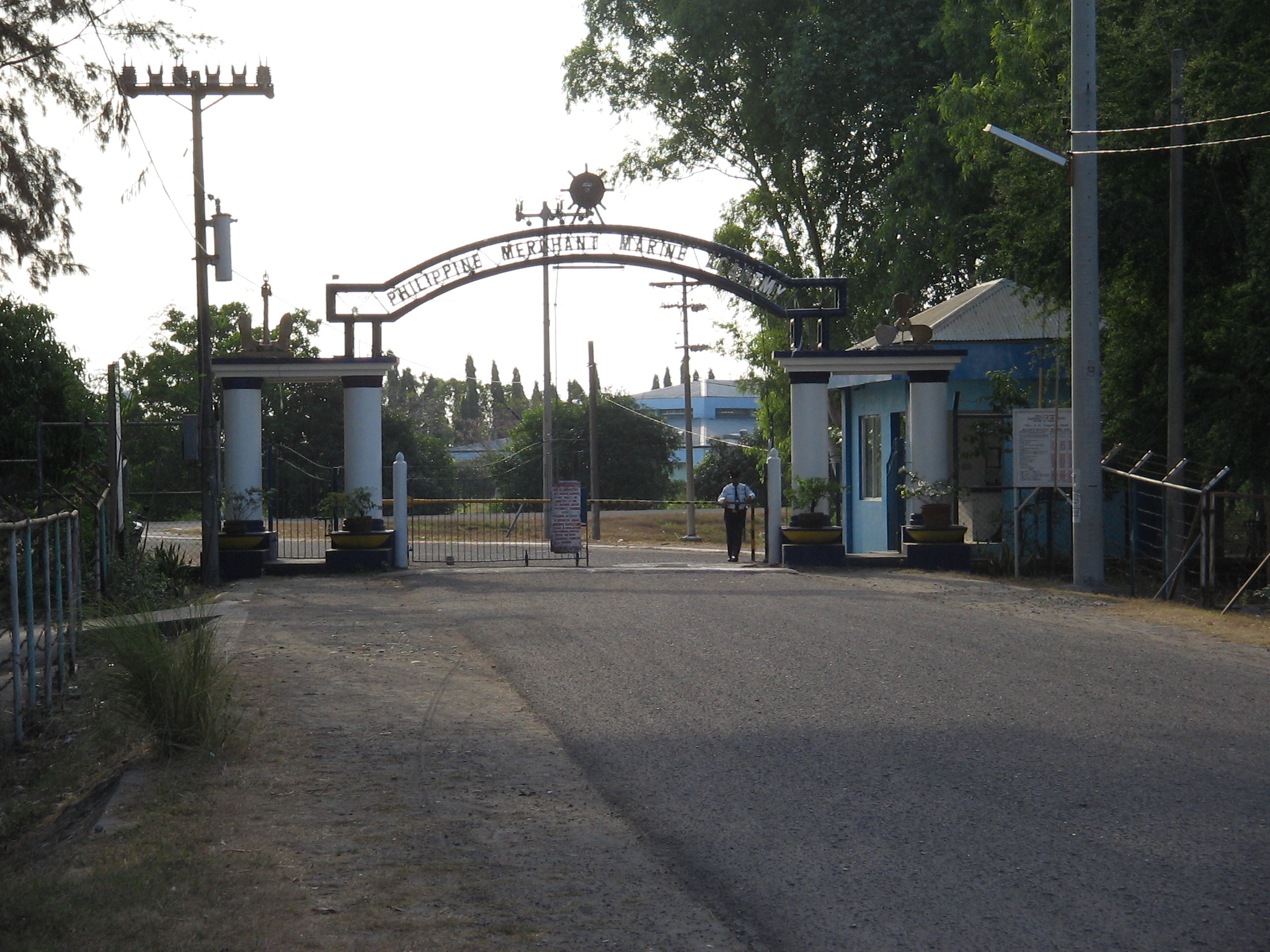
The entrance to the PMMA in San Narciso, Zambales

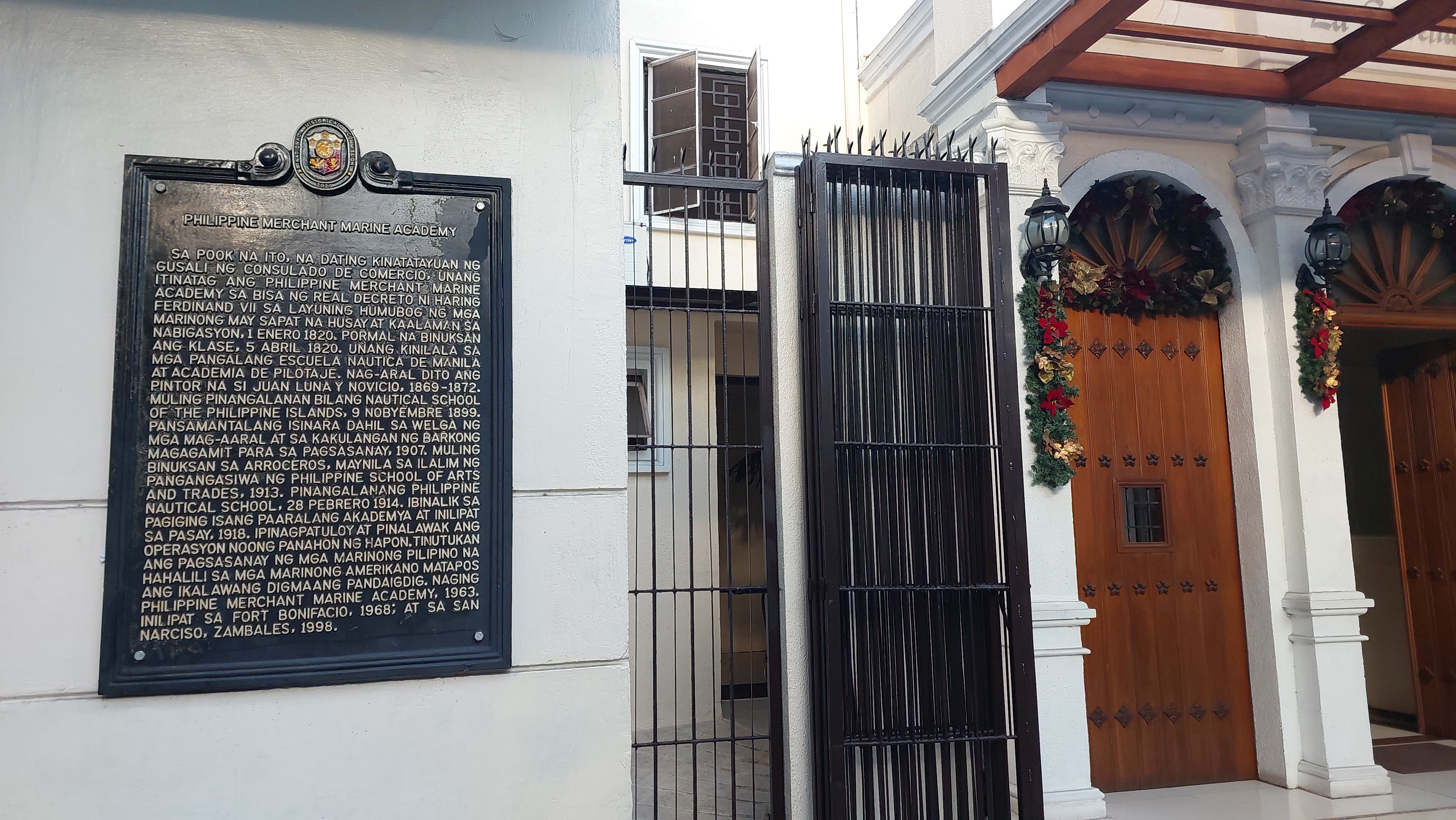
A historical marker at the old PMMA site in Intramuros

The academy offers courses for Bachelor of Science degrees in marine transportation and marine engineering. Both are four-year residency courses consisting of three-years of academic studies (first, second, and fourth years). The one year apprentice training (third year) is aboard commercial vessels plying the international sea lanes as deck or engine room cadets. The academy also offers master's degree courses in shipping business management and maritime education.

The student body is referred to as the Corps of Midshipmen, and follows a rigid seniority system. Each year level is a "class". The fourth-year graduating students are called First Class Midshipmen (1CL), the third year is Second Class Midshipmen (2CL), the second year is Third Class Midshipmen (3CL) and the first year is the Fourth Class Midshipmen. The Fourth Class Midshipmen are also referred to as plebes or bugs, while the other classes are referred to as upperclassmen.

Third Class Midshipmen are also called "Tiger of the Corps". Second Class Midshipmen sail around the world on different merchant marine vessels, as per their compliance for a 1-year shipboard training aboard international/ocean-going vessels. They have a rank of Deck Cadet for BSMT Cadets and Engine Cadet for BSMarE Cadets. The First Class Midshipmen are also called "King of The Barracks", "Dragon of the Corps". They aspire to succeed in finishing their 3 years of being a cadet and a graduating class of their year.

Aspiring midshipmen must pass the entrance examinations and rigorous medical and physical examinations before admission. For example, males must be at least five feet three inches tall, and females must be at least five feet one inch tall and never have given birth. A long list of diseases, including major orthodontic problems and wearing glasses, disqualify both sexes.

Successful applicants report to the academy for orientation, a month-long period of indoctrination and training which begins in the approved academic calendar of the following academic year. Probationary Midshipmen or "probies" who pass this orientation & indoctrination trainings undertake an oath-taking ceremony at the end, and are assigned serial numbers, given uniforms, and incorporated as Fourth Class Midshipmen.

The curriculum involves both academics and military-style leadership and discipline, aimed at training marine officers to manage coastal and foreign trade, serve as shipping executives, port supervisors, and marine surveyors, as well as naval officers in time of war or national emergency. The curriculum follows the guidelines of the 1995 STCW and the Policies, Standards and Guidelines for Maritime Education 1997 set by the Commission on Higher Education.

The PMMA is part of the Luzon Science Consortium.

== Notable alumni ==
- President Ferdinand "Bong Bong" Romualdez Marcos Jr., Honorary Member of PMMA Class 1983
- Marcelo Azcárraga, Prime Minister of Spain
- Román Basa, Katipunan Supreme Council president
- Ponciano Bautista, Commodore PN, Korean War veteran
- Reuben Doria, Commodore PCG
- Manuel Earnshaw, Resident Commissioner of the Philippines
- Herby Escutin, Admiral PCG
- Joel Garcia, Admiral PCG, PCG Commandant
- Dante Gonzaga, Commodore PN
- Victor Jose, Commodore PN, veteran of WWII, Korean and Vietnam Wars
- Juan B. Lacson, founder of John B. Lacson Foundation Maritime University
- Pascual Ledesma, Director of the Navy
- Juan Luna, artist and diplomatic agent
- Carmelo Manzano, Commander USCGR, decorated WWII veteran
- Rufino Martinez, Consul General
- Rogelio Morales, PMMA Superintendent
- Efigenio Navarro, Brigadier General PC
- Gregorio Oca, founder of Maritime Academy of Asia and the Pacific
- Ernesto Ogbinar, Rear Admiral, Flag Officer in Command PN
- Jose Rancudo, Major General, Commanding General PAF
- Hilario Ruiz, Rear Admiral, Flag Officer in Command PN
- Margarito Sanchez, Rear Admiral PN
- Robert Weilbacher, Micronesian politician

== See also ==
- Philippine Military Academy
- Philippine National Police Academy
- Cadet rank in the Philippines
