= Maritime Academy of Asia and the Pacific =

Private maritime college in Bataan, Philippines

- MAAP
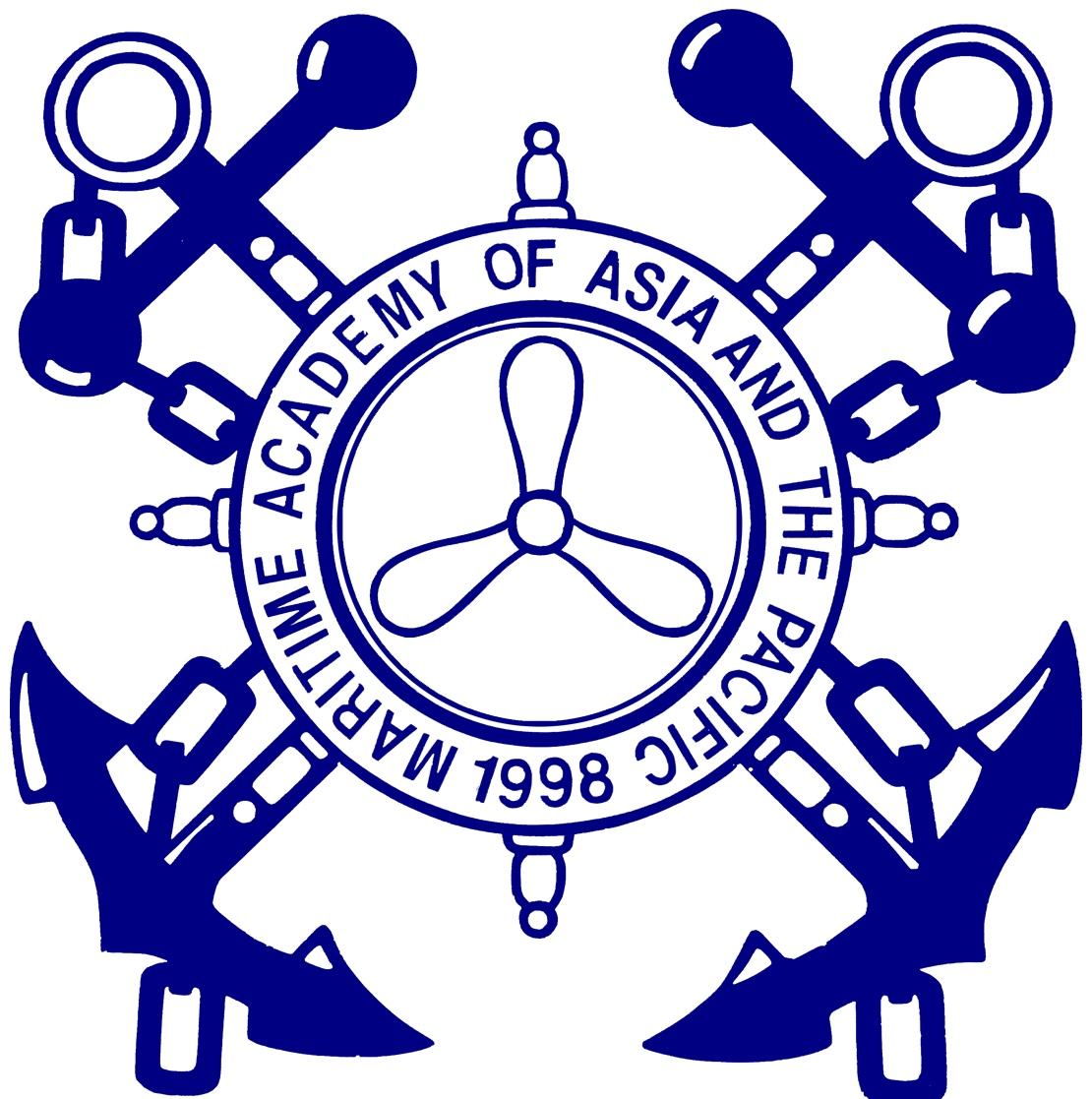
- Official Seal
- Motto: Virtus, Fides et Disiplina
- Motto in English: Virtue, Faith and Discipline
- Academy Hymn: Cradle of Destiny
- Type: Private Institution
- Established: January 14, 1998; 28 years ago
- Founder: Capt. Gregorio S. Oca
- Affiliations: AMOSUP, PTGWO, ITF, FAME, JSU, IMMAJ, NSU, IMEC, NSA, JSA, Philippine Navy
- President: VADM Eduardo Ma. R. Santos, AFP (Ret.)
- Vice-president: Engr. Felix M. Oca
- Dean: C/E Julius M. Jimenez, PhD
- Location: Kamaya Point, Brgy. Alas-asin, Mariveles, Bataan, 2105, Philippines; 14°26.7′N 120°33.0′E
- Campus: 103 hectares (1.03 km^{2})
- Website: maap.edu.ph
- Location in Luzon Location in the Philippines

The Maritime Academy of Asia and the Pacific (MAAP) is a non-stock, non-profit maritime higher educational institution which is owned, developed and operated by the Associated Marine Officers' and Seamen's Union of the Philippines (AMOSUP). Its founding president, Capt. Gregorio S. Oca, alumnus of Philippine Nautical School (presently Philippine Merchant Marine Academy) headed the academy's board of governors, a group comprised by some of the organizations in the international maritime industry: the Filipino Association of Maritime Employers (FAME), the International Transport Workers’ Federation (ITF), the All Japan Seamen's Union, the Norwegian Seafarers’ Union (NSU), the International Maritime Employers Committee Limited (IMEC), the Danish Shipowners Association, the Norwegian Shipowners Association (NSA), Japanese Shipowners Association (JSA), and the International Mariners Management Association of Japan (IMMAJ). With their technical and financial support, the first MAAP campus opened in 1999.

The All-Japan Seamen's Union (JSU) and the International Mariners Management Association of Japan (IMMAJ) has partnered with MAAP to build a second facility within the academy grounds, the JSU-IMAAJ Campus.

== History ==
The Maritime Academy of Asia and the Pacific (MAAP) was established on January 14, 1998, at Kamaya Point, Alas-asin, Mariveles, Bataan, in an 18-hectare (44-acre) land. It was founded by Capt. Gregorio S. Oca, an alumnus of Philippine Nautical School (presently Philippine Merchant Marine Academy), chairman of the Associated Marine Officers and Seamen's Union of the Philippines (AMOSUP). Its inauguration on November 6, 1999, was attended by Philippine President Joseph Ejercito Estrada.

It is run by a governing board from the AMOSUP, the private sectors, the Danish Shipowners Association, the Norwegian Shipowners Association, the Japanese Shipowners Association, the All Japan Seamens' Union, the International Worker's Transport Federation, the International Maritime Employees Committee, and the Filipino Association of Mariner's Employment.

In 2009, the academy expanded its campus from its initial 18-hectare (44-acre) land area to a 103 hectares (250 acres). Two Japanese seafarer organizations, the All Japan Seamen's Union (JSU) and the International Mariners Management Association of Japan (IMMAJ), contributed to the construction of the new campus and was involved from then on with its operation. Hence, the additions to its initials "AJSU-IMMAJ Campus".

== Facilities ==
TS Kapitan Felix Oca
History

Japan
- Name: MS Seiun Maru
- Owner: Inter Pacific Lines Co., Ltd.
- Builder: NKK Corporation
- Commissioned: July 1968; 58 years ago
- Decommissioned: 1997
- Renamed: TS Kapitan Felix Oca
- Home port: Yokohama
- Status: Acquired by AMOSUP

History

PHLPhilippines
- Name: TS Kapitan Felix Oca
- Namesake: Felix Oca
- Owner: Associated Marine Officers and Seamen’s Union of the Philippines (AMOSUP)
- Operator: Maritime Academy of Asia and the Pacific-Kamaya Point (MAAP-Kamaya Point) (Ship Manager)
- Port of registry: Manila
- Commissioned: November 19, 1997; 28 years ago
- Home port: Kamaya Point, Alas-asin, Mariveles, Bataan
- Identification: Registration No. 105069; IMO No. 6903876; Call sign DYHH

General characteristics
- Type: Training ship
- Tonnage: 5,028
- Displacement: 5,781.2 tons
- Length: 114.55 m (375.8 ft)
- Beam: 26 m
- Depth: 8 m (26 ft)
- Propulsion: Hitachi2BF-110 750 VT-B&W Diesel
- Speed: 16.72 knots
- Capacity: 247
- Crew: 28

The two campuses are located on Kamaya Point Road, on the southern slope of Mount Mariveles near the shore of Manila Bay facing Corregidor Island. Each has three main buildings: an academic building with classrooms, simulators, laboratories and a library; a dormitory with a capacity of 1,000; and a dining hall. Two Scandinavian-made simulators are housed in the academic buildings. The MAAP training dock is located at the end of Kamaya Point Road on the shore of the North Channel entrance of Manila Bay.

Summary of Facilities:

- Navigation Simulator Complex with 360° field of vision on a platform each linked to Full Mission Engine Simulator
- Chart/ECDIS Exercise Room
- GMDSS Laboratory
- Liquid Cargo Handling Simulator
- Computer-based Propulsion Plant
- Electrotech Laboratory
- Machine Shop
- Physics Laboratory
- Chemistry Laboratory
- Microwave VSAT System and 3 servers for Telecommunications & Internet Access
- Computer Laboratory
- Refrigeration/Air-conditioning Laboratory
- Japanese Compact Ship Handling Simulator
- Pneumatic/Hydraulic Laboratory
- Electromechanical Systems & Automation Laboratory
- Liquid Natural Gas Simulator
- Fire Fighting Center
- Vessel Training Center
- Enclosed Lifeboat on Free Fall Davit
- Chemical/Product Tanker Simulator
- Language Laboratory
- Modern Library with over 8,000 titles
- Helicopter Underwater Escape Trainer

== Academic degrees ==
The academy awards the following degrees:

- Bachelor of Science in Marine Transportation (BSMT)
- Bachelor of Science in Marine Engineering (BSMarE)
- Bachelor of Science in Marine Transportation and Engineering (BSMTE)

The academy also offers subsidiary and supplementary courses such as Cook's Course, Bridging Program, Trainings on Fire Fighting and Medical First-Aid.

Its ROTC program is supervised by officers from the Philippine Navy.

Its first graduates for the dual course (BSMTE) came from the Class of Valchirion (2009). Graduates of the said course are sponsored by Maersk Filipinas.

== Training Ship ==
The TS Kapitan Felix Oca was launched by NKK Corporation as MS Seiun Maru in July 1968 in Yokohama, Japan. It was owned by first owned by Inter Pacific Lines Co., Ltd. of Japan and utilized as a training ship.

In 1997, AMOSUP (Associated Marine Officers and Seamen's Union of the Philippines) acquired the training ship M.V. Seiun Maru from the Ministry of Transport of Japan. It was delivered in Manila on November 19, 1997, and placed under the Philippine flag with the vessel name “T/S Kapitan Felix Oca“.

It was designated as a Philippine Navy Affiliated Reserve Unit (PNARU) on September 24, 1999.

The TSKFO is equipped with a training bridge with actual navigation instruments, engine lecture room, engine exercise room and automated engine control room.

Gallery
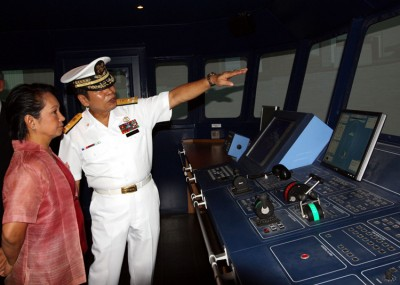
President Gloria Macapagal Arroyo listens to MAAP president in her visit to the academy.

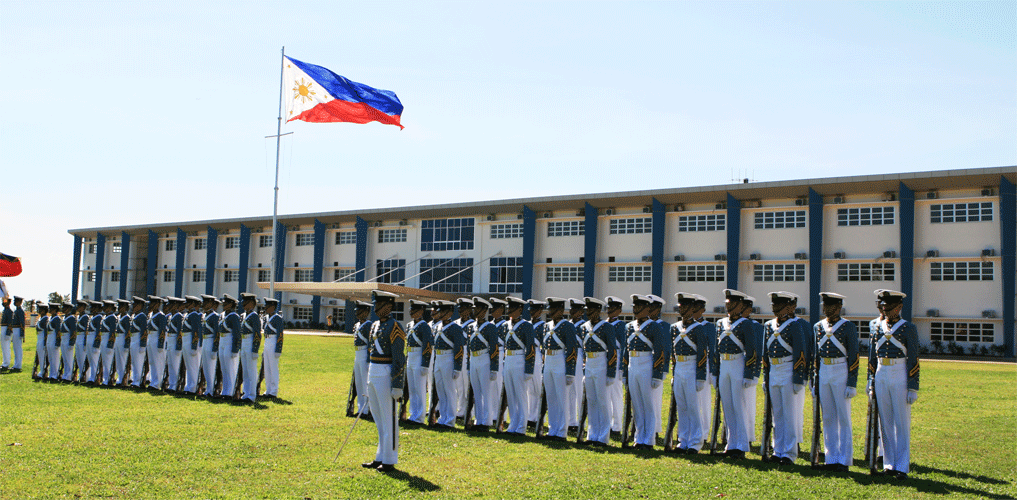
MAAP midshipmen in formation in front of JSU-IMMAJ campus.

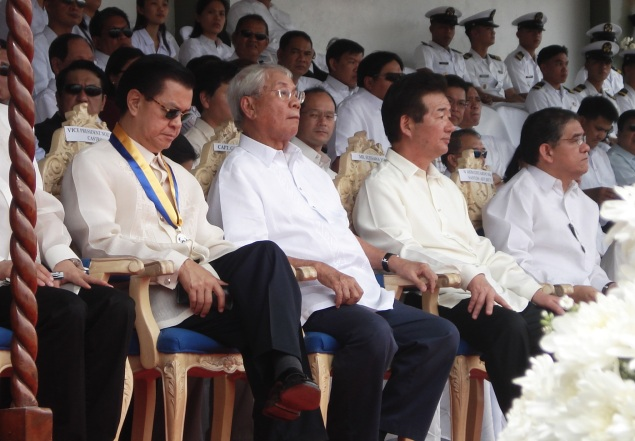
Groundbreaking ceremony for the new campus. In attendance were Vice President Noli de Castro, academy founder Capt. Gregorio Oca, AJSU president Yoji Fujisawa and DOLE secretary Marianito Roque.

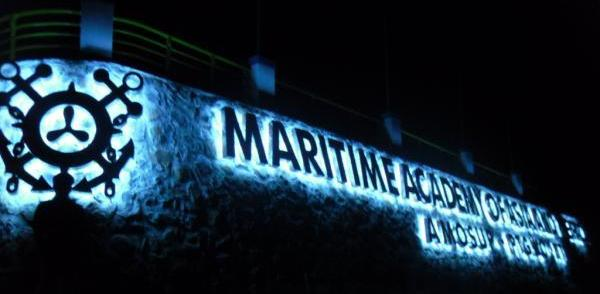
Entrance to the new MAAP campus.

== See also ==
Cadet rank in the Philippines
