= List of people from Iloilo =

The following is a list of people born or associated with Iloilo and Iloilo City.

== Arts, literature, and entertainment ==
=== Beauty pageants ===
- Angelia Ong – Miss Earth 2015
- Anjanette Abayari – Binibining Pilipinas Universe 1991
- Pura Villanueva Kalaw – first Manila Carnival Queen 1908
- Rabiya Occeña Sundall Mateo – Miss Universe Philippines 2020
- Alexie Brooks - Miss Eco International 2025

=== Film ===
- Nick Deocampo – film director, film historian
- Peter Solis Nery – film director, actor, producer, writer; Gugma sa Panahon sang Bakunawa (2012)

=== Literature ===
- Gilbert Luis R. Centina III – Palanca awardee
- Leoncio P. Deriada – Ilonggo Palanca awardee
- Magdalena Jalandoni – Hiligaynon poet, National Cultural awardee for Literature
- Ramon Muzones – National Artist for Literature.
- Stevan Javellana – Ilonggo writer
- Peter Solis Nery – Ilonggo Palanca Awards Hall of Fame awardee; first Filipino author invited to the Sharjah International Book Fair
- Guillermo Gómez Rivera – Ilonggo writer
- Miguel Syjuco – winner of 2008 Man Asian Literary Prize

=== Performing arts ===
==== Music ====
- Emman Abatayo – singer, songwriter, Pinoy Dream Academy Season 1 scholar
- Jose Mari Chan – singer, songwriter
- Vehnee Saturno – record producer
- Nina Girado – singer
- Jed Madela – singer, songwriter
- Ruben Tagalog – Kundiman singer
- Young JV – singer, actor, model, and dancer
- Jhett Tolentino – singer, Grammy and Tony-award winning theatrical producer
- beabadoobee – indie pop rock singer-songwriter and guitarist

==== TV and movie personalities ====
- Allan K. - actor, comedian, host, singer and businessman.
- Carla Abellana – actress, model, TV host and personality
- John Arcilla – actor
- Sharmaine Arnaiz – actress
- Claudine Barretto – actress
- Gretchen Barretto – actress
- Billy Crawford – actor, model, singer, TV host and personality
- Dingdong Dantes – actor, model
- Charlie Davao – actor
- Sunshine Dizon – actress, model
- Gabb Drilon – actor
- Anita Linda – actress
- Ike Lozada – actor
- Edu Manzano – TV host, actor
- Luis Manzano – actor, model, TV host and personality
- Pokwang – actress, comedian
- Delia Razon – actress
- Paul Salas – actor
- Myrtle Sarrosa – Pinoy Big Brother Teen Edition 4 Big Winner
- Arthur Solinap – actor
- Prince Stefan (actor) – actor, model, and dancer
- Joy Viado – actress, comedian
- Marita Zobel – actress
- Dawn Zulueta – actress

=== Mass communications ===
- Billy Balbastro – radio broadcaster
- Karen Davila – main news anchor on the ABS-CBN News Channel programmers TV Patrol and Headstart with Karen Davila

=== Visual arts ===
- Romeo Villalva Tabuena – Filipino painter and printmaker
- Iain Macnab and Chica Macnab The Scottish artists who were both born in Iloilo

== Business ==
- Alfonso A. Uy – first President of Filipino-Chinese Chamber of Commerce and Industry from Visayas and Mindanao
- Eugenio Lopez, Sr. – former Chairman of the Lopez Group of Companies
- Eugenio Lopez, Jr. – former Chairman Emeritus of ABS-CBN
- Eugenio Lopez III – the 3rd generation Eugenio of the Lopez family; present Chairman of ABS-CBN
- Edgar Sia – founder of Mang Inasal and DoubleDragon Corporation
- Jonha Richman – investor and dubbed by Rappler as one of the 'most inspiring Filipino entrepreneurs'

== Education ==
- Jose Cabalum, Sr. – educator
- William Valentine – American Protestant missionary and educator; founded Central Philippine University, the second American university in Asia

== Government service ==
=== Executive service ===
- Teofisto Guingona, Jr. – former Senator and Vice President of the Philippines
- Fernando López – former Senator, Vice President of the Philippines, and Mayor of Iloilo City
- Amelita Ramos – former First Lady of the Philippines; wife of former President Fidel Ramos
- Liza Araneta Marcos – First Lady of the Philippines; wife of President Bongbong Marcos

=== Judiciary ===
- Ramón Avanceña – former Chief Justice of the Supreme Court of the Philippines and Vice President
- Carolina Griño-Aquino – former Associate Justice of the Supreme Court of the Philippines, Rank 1st 1950 Philippine Bar Examinations
- Gregorio Perfecto – former Associate Justice of the Supreme Court of the Philippines
- Florenz Regalado – former Associate Justice of the Supreme Court of the Philippines and record holder for the highest average in the Philippine Bar Examinations, with his 1954 mark of 96.7%
- Francis Jardeleza – former Associate Justice of the Supreme Court of the Philippines and Solicitor General of the Philippines
- Raul M. Gonzalez – former Secretary of Justice
- Gregorio S. Araneta – former Secretary of Finance and Justice, Attorney General of the Philippines, and Solicitor General of the Philippines

=== Legislators ===
==== Senators ====
- Tomas Confesor – Senator served in the 2nd Commonwealth Congress or 1st Congress of the Philippines, elected ranked 6th in the 1946 national elections, former Governor of Iloilo
- José María Arroyo – Senator from the Seventh Senatorial District
- Jose Hontiveros – Senator of the Insular Government of the Philippine Islands, Associate Justice of the Supreme Court of the Philippines
- Risa Hontiveros – Senator 17th, 18th, 19th, 20th Congress; House Representative for Akbayan 13th 14th Congress
- Francisco Felipe Villanueva – Visayan delegate to the Malolos Congress, Senate majority floor leader during the Fourth Legislature in 1916–1919
- Nikki Coseteng – Senator, 8th Congress
- Miriam Defensor Santiago – Senator, 10th, 11th, 13th, 14th, 15th, and 16th Congress
- Franklin Drilon – Senator, 10th, 11th (Senate President), 12th (Senate President), 13th (Senate President), 15th, 16th (Senate President), and 17th (Senate President pro tempore) Congress
- Teofisto Guingona, Sr. – Senator, 4th Philippine Legislature
- Grace Poe-Llamanzares – Senator, 16th Congress of the Philippines
- Manuel Villar – Senator, 12th, 13th (Senate President), 14th (Senate President), 15th Congress
- Jose Zulueta – Senator and Senate President, 2nd Congress

==== House Representatives ====
- Niel Tupas Jr. – former House Representatives of the 5th district of Iloilo
- Ferjenel Biron – former House Representatives of the 4th district of Iloilo
- Janette Garin – incumbent House Representatives of the 4th district of Iloilo, former Secretary of Health
- Richard Garin – former House Representatives of the 1st district of Iloilo and Vice Governor of Iloilo
- Judy Syjuco – former House Representatives of the 2nd district of Iloilo
- Julienne Baronda – incumbent House Representatives of the lone district of Iloilo City

=== Local Government ===
- Niel Tupas Sr. – former Governor of Iloilo and House Representatives of the 5th district of Iloilo
- Arthur Defensor Sr. – former Governor of Iloilo and House Representatives of the 3rd district of Iloilo
- Arthur Defensor Jr. – incumbent Governor of Iloilo, former House Representatives of the 3rd district of Iloilo
- Isko Moreno – 27th Mayor of Manila and actor whose father originally hail from San Joaquin, Iloilo
- Jerry Treñas – incumbent Mayor of Iloilo City
- Jed Patrick Mabilog – former Mayor of Iloilo City

=== Military service ===
- Vicente Piccio, Jr. – former chief of the Philippine Air Force
- Ramona Go – First Female Brigadier General

=== Civil service ===
- Resurreccion Borra – COMELEC Commissioner

== Social sciences ==
- F. Landa Jocano – anthropologist and historian; documented the epic Hinilawod of the Panay Bukidnon of Iloilo
- Alicia P. Magos – anthropologist and historian; published and documented the culture of Western Visayas, especially the Panay Bukidnon

== Innovators and scientists ==
- Alexis Belonio – engineer, inventor and winner of Rolex Award for Enterprise in 2008
- Josette Biyo – Intel Excellence for Teaching awardee in 2002; an asteroid was named after her, 13241 Biyo
- Magdalena Villaruz, inventor
- Mariano Yogore, Jr, MD, PHD, MPH – accomplished Scientist at major universities. Senior author and co-author in about 50 scientific publications, and published a number of books. Published in Library of Congress

== Religious service ==
- Fernando Capalla – present Archbishop of Davao
- Eduardo Hontiveros – Filipino Jesuit composer and musician
- Angel Lagdameo – 5th Archbishop of Jaro and former President of Catholic Bishops' Conference of the Philippines
- Antonio Ledesma – Archbishop of Cagayan de Oro
- Jose S. Palma – present Archbishop of Cebu and President of Catholic Bishops' Conference of the Philippines
- Alberto Jover Piamonte – 4th Archbishop of Jaro
- Jaime Sin – 9th Archbishop of Jaro and 30th Archbishop of Manila
- Mother Rosario Arroyo de la Visitacion - Servant of God, founder Dominican Sisters of the Most Holy Rosary of the Philippines

== Revolutionaries and war heroes ==
- Juan Araneta – led the Negros Revolution
- Ludovico Arroyo Bañas – World War II veteran, pioneer in Philippine telecommunications
- Jose Calugas – World War II Medal of Honor awardee
- Martin Teofilo Delgado – revolutionary hero, soldier, politician
- Adriano Hernandez – leader of the "Cry of Lincud", the first armed uprising for independence in the province of Iloilo
- Graciano Lopez Jaena – revolutionary hero, writer, editor, orator, and journalist, founder of La Solidaridad
- Aniceto Lacson – led the Negros Revolution
- Teresa Magbanua – the Joan of Arc of the Visayas
- Patrocinio Gamboa – revolutionary heroine, brought the Philippine flag to Sta. Barbara, where it was first raised outside the capital.

== Sports ==
- Paulino Alcántara – international football player who played for FC Barcelona
- Ian Araneta – member of Philippine Azkals
- Kurt Bachmann – basketball player
- Ken Bono – PBA player
- Emelio Caligdong – Vice Captain of Philippine Azkals and 2012 The Outstanding Young Men (TOYM) awardee
- Anjo Caram – PBA player, former NCAA basketball player for San Beda Red Lions
- Denver Cuello – current WBC International minimumweight champion
- Kenneth Duremdes – PBA player
- Rudy Fernandez – amputee triathlete
- Emmanuel "Emman" Monfort – PBA player, former UAAP basketball player for the Ateneo Blue Eagles, former Ateneo de Iloilo-SMCS player Ateneo Blue Dragons
- Bong Ravena – PBA player
- Kiefer Ravena – UAAP basketball player for the Ateneo Blue Eagles
- Masunoyama Tomoharu – sumo wrestler
- Eugenio Torre – first Filipino and Asian Grandmaster
- Ronald Tubid – PBA player
- James Yap – PBA player, former ICCHS or Huasiong basketball player
- Wesley So – chess prodigy; youngest Filipino chess grandmaster
- Manuel Araneta Jr. – basketball player in 1948 Summer Olympics

== Others ==
- Nicholas Loney – 19th-century British diplomat and businessman who helped develop Iloilo City
- Josefa Jara Martinez – social worker, suffragist and civic leader
- Perfecto R. Yasay, Jr. – former Securities and Exchange Commission (SEC) Chairman; 2010 Philippine Vice-Presidential candidate running mate alongside Eddie Villanueva
