= Ayala North Point =

Ayala North Point Estate

Project
- Opening date: 1988
- Developer: Makati Development Corporation
- Operator: Ayala Property Management Corporation
- Owner: Ayala Land

Location
- Interactive map of Ayala North Point
- Coordinates: 10°43′17.3″N 122°57′43.2″E
- Country: Philippines
- Region: Western Visayas
- Province: Negros Occidental
- Component city: Talisay
- Location: Talisay City, Negros Occidental, Philippines

Ayala North Point, is a real estate development project in Talisay, Negros Occidental created through a joint venture between Ayala Corporation and the Lacson estate. The project, which began in 1988 in collaboration with the heirs of General Aniceto Lacson, former president of the Republic of Negros, is an ongoing development. Modeled after the master-planned, mixed-use residential township concept first introduced with Ayala Alabang, the estate combines various residential and commercial elements.

== Residential ==
Ayala Land subsidiaries like Ayala Premier, Alveo, Avida and Amaia Scapes all have existing residential concept projects in the estate. Ayala Premier is the pioneer developer, which placed Ayala North Point in the prime use map in the Visayas.

== Commercial ==
The District, Ayala Malls' mid-level mall development, opened doors on May 8, 2013 as a community center, catering to the local residents and shoppers from neighboring Bacolod and Silay. It includes a gross lease area of an initial 26,725-square-meter (6.604-acre), which excludes the anchor supermarket, Metro Gaisano, adjacent to an earlier-built BPO facility. It is the first mall development of Ayala Land in Negros Occidental after Capitol Central.
