= Juanita Cruz =

Juanita Cruz is a novel written by Magdalena G. Jalandoni in 1966. It was originally written in Hiligaynon.

== Plot ==
Juanita Cruz, also known as Nita, is the only daughter of Don Macario and Doña Beatriz, one of the most affluent families from the town of Salog (now known as Jaro) in the province of Iloilo. Her friendship with Lina, a daughter of a poor family, opens her eyes to see the disparity between the rich and the poor. As a child, the early demise of Lina gives Nita her first heartache.

Nita is sheltered and pampered as she grows. She is considered the binukot, the untouched princess, of her rich and powerful family. Her fate starts to change when she meets the already fine man named Elias, the only brother of her friend Lina. Since Elias’ family belongs to a lower social status, Nita's parents and brothers, Edgar and Chito, are against their relationship.

The day before Elias leaves the country to study in Spain under a scholarship grant, the lovers secretly meet in a garden. Unfortunately, they are caught by Don Macario and Dona Beatriz. Soon, Nita's position in her family is replaced by her cousin Mila. Later on, Nita can no longer bear her sufferings, so decides to leave their house and finds herself challenged by the waves of fate that would have drowned her in uncharted depths of the ocean.

Nita embarks on a journey in pursuit of her passions in life. She remains single until she finally met Elias, the man of her dreams, again. The love story of Nita and Elias ends with the death of Elias as one of the high-ranking officers of the revolutionary army against the Spanish colonizers.
