= Antonio Ledesma Jayme =

Filipino lawyer, revolutionary hero, governor and assemblyman

Antonio L. Jayme
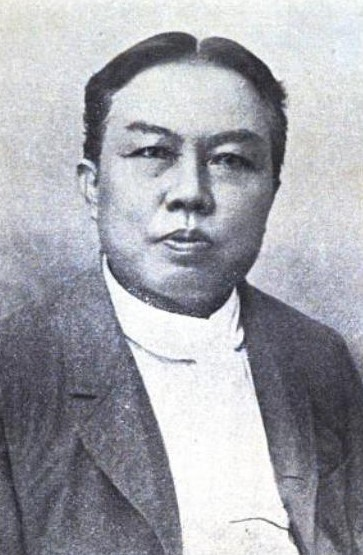
- Jayme as a member of the Philippine Assembly, 1908

Member of the Philippine Assembly from Negros Occidental's 1st district
- In office October 16, 1907 – March 13, 1909
- Preceded by: District established
- Succeeded by: José López Villanueva

4th Governor of Negros Occidental
- In office March 7, 1904 – May 8, 1906
- Preceded by: Leandro Locsin Rama
- Succeeded by: Manuel Lopez

Secretary of Justice Republic of Negros
- In office November 27, 1898 – April 30, 1901
- President: Aniceto Lacson
- Preceded by: (office created)
- Succeeded by: (office abolished)

Personal details
- Born: July 24, 1854 Jaro, Iloilo City, Iloilo, Captaincy General of the Philippines
- Died: October 19, 1937 (aged 83) Bacolod, Negros Occidental, Commonwealth of the Philippines
- Party: Nacionalista
- Occupation: Lawyer

Antonio Ledesma Jayme (July 24, 1854 – October 19, 1937) was a Filipino lawyer, revolutionary hero, Governor of Negros Occidental, and assemblyman, as well as a lawmaker and a revolutionary nation's founding father and a signatory to a nation-state's constitution.

== Early years and education ==
Antonio L. Jayme was born on July 24, 1854, in what is now the district of Jaro, Iloilo City. He was the eldest of seven children of Aguedo Gamboa Jayme and the former Sabina Lopez Ledesma.

Jayme's family migrated to Silay City, Negros Occidental when he was still young. This occurred during a time when the Chinese mestizos of Jaro and Molo in Panay Island were forced to search for better business opportunities aside from Iloilo's declining textile industry, brought about by cheap imports from mainland China. The promise of great reward afforded by the high price of world sugar constituted this preoccupation among Jaro's businessmen to settle in nearby Negros Island. Like the rest of the wave of immigrants, the Jaymes pursued sugar-based agriculture and transformed a tract of land into an hacienda or plantation.

As was common among the principalia in Negros, Jayme enjoyed an early education by crossing the Guimaras Strait to attend the Seminario de Jaro, the Jaro Seminary. He was easily accommodated as his uncle on the paternal side, Fray Francisco Jayme (who tutored and raised Philippine patriot Graciano Lopez-Jaena), was its first rector. From 1869 to 1871, Jayme studied philosophy and letters at Jaro which was still the most populated, most industrious and most prosperous province in the Philippines at that time.

However, in a spirit of wanderlust and in search of better education, he left for Manila to enroll at the Colegio de San Juan de Letran in 1872. After completing his segunda ensenanza (Spanish, "secondary education"), he entered the University of Santo Tomas, where he earned his licenciado en jurisprudencia (equivalent to a Bachelor of Laws) in October 1881.

He was to become the first Ilonggo lawyer to practice law in Negros during the Spanish colonial period in the Philippines. He subsequently entered public service as justice of the peace and judge of the Court of First Instance in the province.

== The Philippine Revolution and its aftermath ==
During the second stage of the Philippine Revolution in 1898, Negros took up arms against Spain. Now known as the Cinco de Noviembre Movement or the November 5 Movement of the Negros Revolution, this historical event saw Jayme witnessing the bloodless surrender of Spanish troops in Bacolod. For the first time, a Philippine flag fluttered triumphantly in the Spanish garrison of Bacolod, an event that saw the people of Negros break "more than three hundred years of Spanish rule without firing a shot."

Jayme was a signatory to the ratification of a constitution for a new government in the wake of Spanish defeat. Upon the formation of the "Cantonal Republic of Negros" (Spanish: República Cantonal de Negros), renamed the Republic of Negros on July 22, 1899, Jayme occupied the seat of Secretary of Justice under President Aniceto Lacson and acted as general counselor of the provisional government despite internal divisions of leadership. Through tact and careful negotiation, he was able to prevent clashes erupting between one group who favored American sovereignty and another group who rallied against it.

After the United States declared secure control over the Philippine territory, Jayme was elected as provincial governor in the general elections of 1904, defeating Esteban de la Rama.

As governor, Jayme invested public funds to construct schools, encourage enrollment, and increase the literacy rate of his constituents. Aside from hastening the pacification of the province, he conducted campaigns against vagrancy, banditry, gambling and other vices. Political and social conditions in Negros Occidental further improved through his advocacy of law reform. The laws at the time were products of the Spanish legal system of the 19th century. A file prepared by the National Historical Institute of the Philippines said that "He sought remedies to problems by suggesting modifications in existing laws and the enactment of new ones."

His performance as governor led to his election as representative of the first district of Negros Occidental to the First Philippine Assembly in 1907. It was the first time in history that Filipinos formed their own legislative body. He served as a member of the committees on provincial and municipal governments, the committee on the city of Manila, and the committee on the revision of laws. As chairman of the committee on police powers, he authored a bill which sought the abolition of capital punishment.

He returned to private law practice and the management of his haciendas after his career as assemblyman.

== Miscellaneous ==
As a young man, he was noted as an author of various articles written in Spanish and Hiligaynon which were published in periodicals like La Libertad (1900) and La Razon (1906). " P. Moral", "Farole", "Mansilingan", "Panagao", and "G.G." were some of his pseudonyms. He was also a founder and a professor of the Instituto Rizal, which was later renamed as the Negros Occidental High School. He provided the first classrooms and dormitories of the school.

He was a director of the Bacolod-Murcia Sugar Central which exists to this day.

== Death ==
Jayme died on October 19, 1937, leaving his wife and children. His eldest daughter, Angela, married the businessman and philanthropist Fernando Figueroa Gonzaga. Another descendant, Vicente R. Jayme, was appointed as president of Philippine National Bank, secretary of finance and secretary of public works and highways during the term of Philippine President Corazon C. Aquino.

On February 10, 1989, President Aquino, through Republic Act. No. 6709, declared November 5 as a special non-working holiday in Negros Occidental as a reminder of Ilonggo heroism during the Philippine Revolutions at the waning years of the 19th century. This was in commemoration of the Cinco de Noviembre Movement, where Antonio Ledesma Jayme played an important role as secretary of justice.

== See also ==
- List of Philippine laws
- Republic of Negros
- Negros Revolution

== List of court cases ==
- "The LAWPHiL Project - Philippine Laws and Jurispudance Databank". Arellano Law Foundation.

Political offices
Preceded by Leandro Locsin Rama	Governor of Negros Occidental; 1904–1906	Succeeded by Manuel Lopez
