= Jose Calugas =

United States Army Medal of Honor recipient (1907–1998)

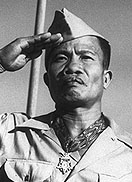
- Calugas in 1945
- Born: December 29, 1907; Barrio Tagsing, Leon, Iloilo, Philippine Islands
- Died: January 18, 1998 (aged 90); Tacoma, Washington, U.S.
- Military career
- Allegiance: Philippines; United States
- Branch: Recognized Guerrilla Unit; Philippine Scouts (United States Army)
- Service years: 1930–1957
- Rank: Captain
- Units: 88th Field Artillery Regiment (Philippine Scouts); 38th Field Artillery Regiment
- Conflicts: World War II: Battle of Bataan; Battle of Luzon; Philippine Resistance (1941–45); Philippines Campaign (1944–45)
- Awards: Medal of Honor

Jose Cabalfin Calugas (December 29, 1907 – January 18, 1998) was a member of the Philippine Scouts during World War II. He received the Medal of Honor for actions during the Battle of Bataan.

At the age of 23, Calugas joined the Philippine Scouts of the United States Army and completed training as an artilleryman and served with different artillery batteries of the Philippine Scouts until his unit was mobilized to fight in World War II. After noticing one of his unit's gun batteries had been put out of commission and its crew killed, he gathered several members of his unit together, dug in and attempted to defend the line. He was captured along with other members of his unit and forced to march to a distant enemy prison camp, where he was held as a prisoner of war. When he was released in 1943, he was secretly assigned to a guerrilla unit in the Philippines where he fought for the liberation of the Philippines from the Japanese.

After World War II, Calugas received a direct commission and became a United States citizen. After retiring from the Army, he settled in Tacoma, Washington.

== Early life and military training ==
Calugas was born in Barrio Tagsing, Leon, Iloilo, Philippines, on December 29, 1907. His mother died when he was ten, and he later left high school in order to work and support his family. In 1930, he enlisted in the United States Army and received his basic training at Fort Sill, Oklahoma. Upon completion, he received additional training as an artilleryman, and was then assigned to the 24th Artillery Regiment of the Philippine Scouts at Fort Stotsenburg, Pampanga. While stationed at Fort Stotsenburg, he married and began to raise a family. His next unit was the 88th Field Artillery Regiment of the Philippine Scouts. He was a Sergeant with Battery B when the United States and the Philippine Commonwealth declared war on Japan in 1941. His unit was mobilized for duty and sent to Bataan in December 1941.

== Action in World War II ==
=== Medal of Honor action at Bataan ===
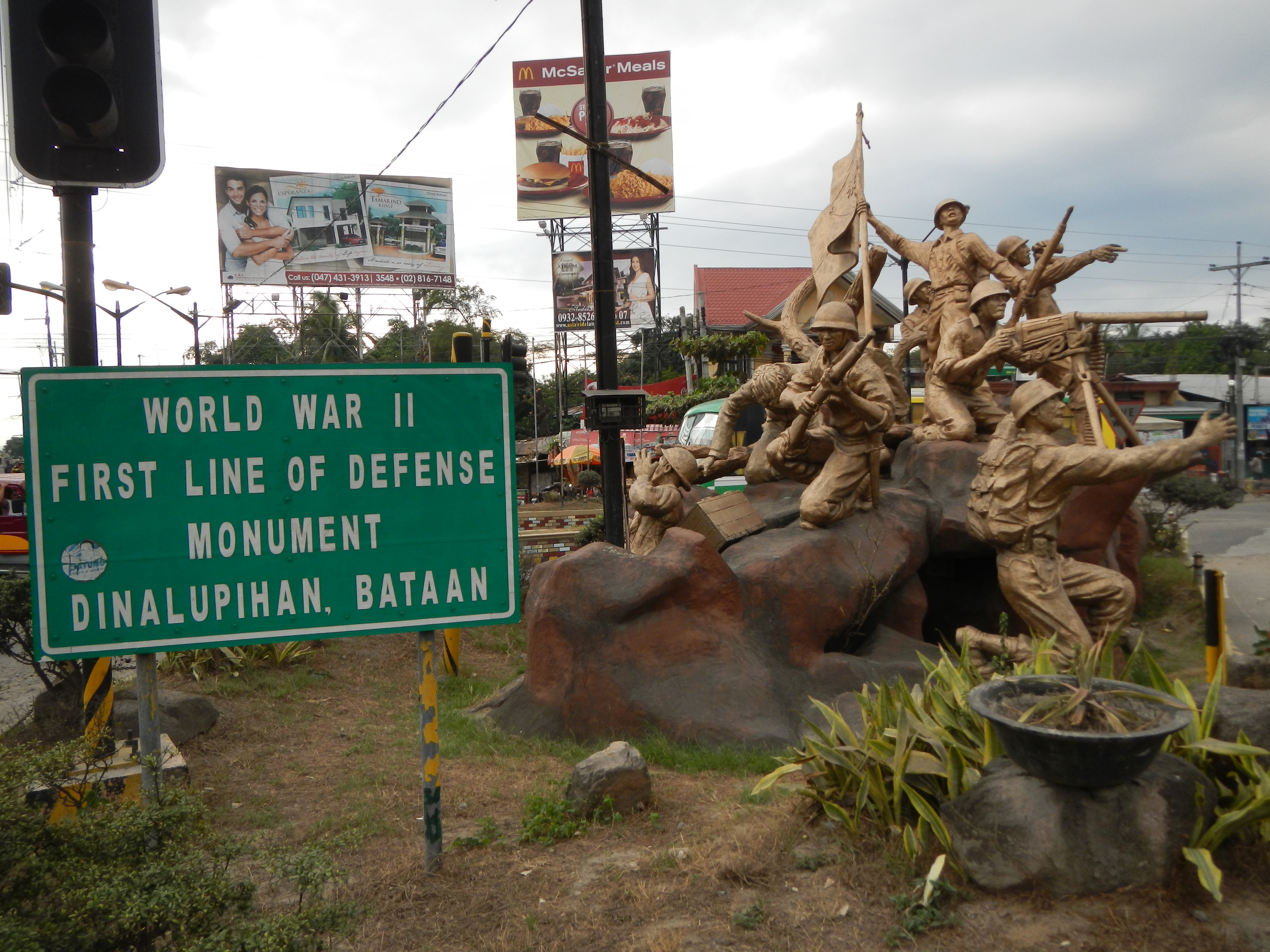
World War II First Line of Defense Memorial (Dinalupihan, Bataan, Philippines).

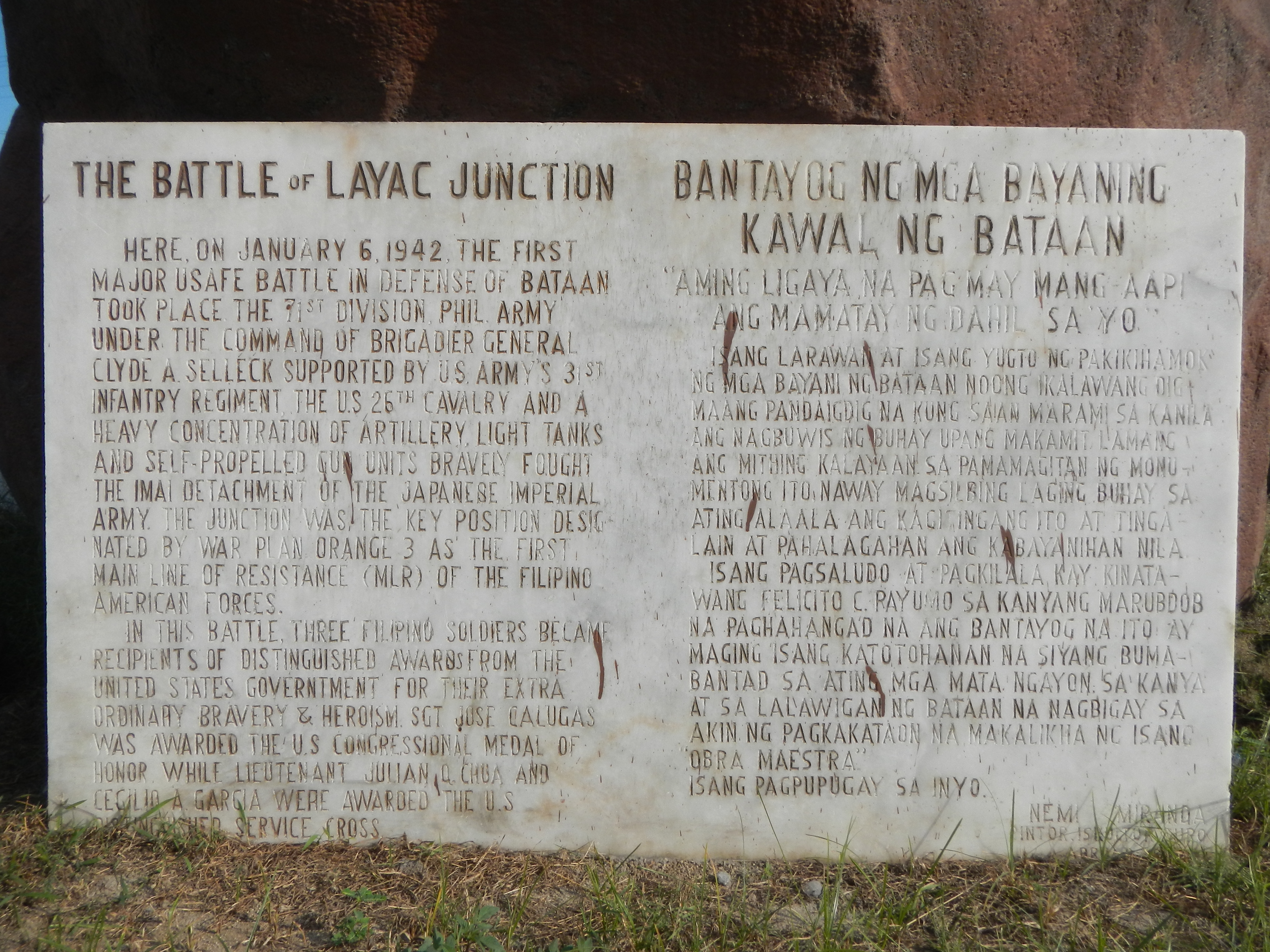
Historical Marker (January 6, 1942 -Jose Calugas was awarded the Medal of Honor).

On January 16, 1942, his unit was covering the withdrawal of a portion of the U.S. Army Forces Far East (USAFFE), with the 26th Cavalry Regiment of the Philippine Scouts and the 31st Infantry Regiment. Calugas was working as a mess sergeant in charge of a group of soldiers who were preparing the day's meals, known as KP duty. He noticed that one of his unit's 75 mm M1917 field guns had been silenced, and its crew killed. Without orders, he ran the 1,000 yards (914 m) across the shell-swept area to the inactive gun position. Once there, he organized a squad of volunteers who returned Japanese artillery fire. The position remained under constant and heavy fire for the rest of the afternoon. While Calugas and his squad maintained a steady fire on the enemy positions, other soldiers had time to dig in and defend the line. As the day ended and combat subsided, he returned to KP. For his actions on that day, his superiors recommended Calugas for the United States military's highest decoration for valor, the Medal of Honor. Before he could receive it, however, all American forces on Bataan surrendered to Japanese forces.

=== Surrender of Bataan and the death march ===
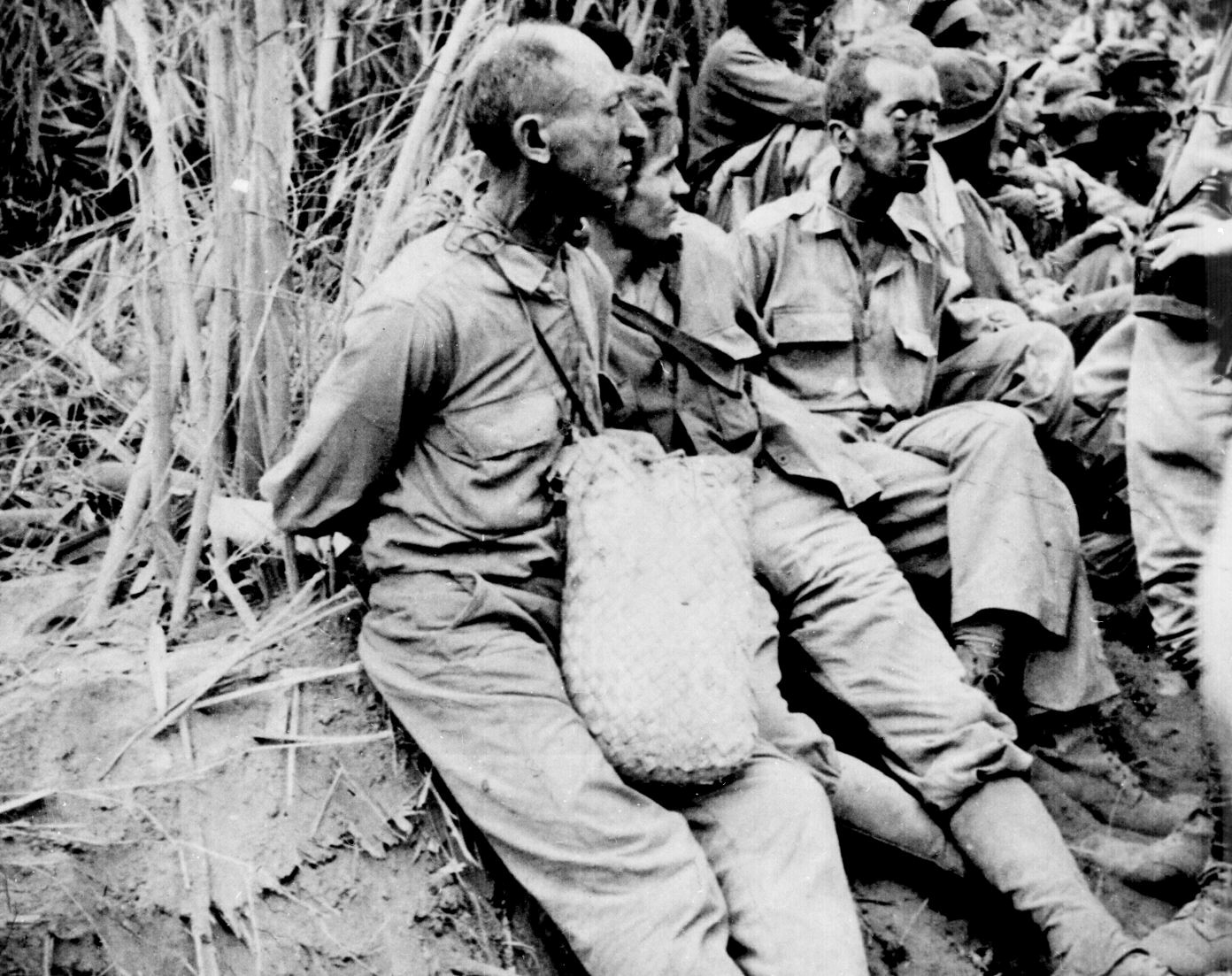
Prisoners during the march from Bataan to the prison camp, May 1942. (National Archives)

Arguably, the Battle of Bataan represented the most intense phase of Imperial Japan's invasion of the Philippines during World War II. During the final stage of the Battle of Bataan and after repeated assaults and artillery fire by Japanese forces, the communications and defenses of the allies on Bataan peninsula had been almost completely destroyed. On the last two days, the entire Allied defense collapsed, clogging all roads with refugees and fleeing troops. By April 8, the senior U.S. commander on Bataan, Major General Edward "Ned" P. King, Jr., decided further resistance was futile, and explored proposals for surrender. On April 9, 1942, approximately 76,000 Filipino and American troops surrendered to a Japanese army of 54,000 men under Lt. General Masaharu Homma. This was the single largest surrender of one of its military forces in American history.

Route of the Bataan Death March. The section from San Fernando to Capas was by rail. The prisoners marched the last 8 miles from Capas to Camp O'Donnell.

After the surrender, Calugas and the other prisoners marched from Mariveles to Camp O'Donnell, a prison camp in the province of Tarlac. The Japanese, having expected the fighting to continue, anticipated about 25,000 prisoners of war and were inadequately prepared or unwilling to transport a group of prisoners three times the size. The majority of the prisoners of war were immediately relieved of their belongings and endured a 61-mile (98 km) march in deep dust, over vehicle-broken macadam roads, and crammed into rail cars for the portion of the journey from San Fernando to Capas. En route, over 21,000 men and women died from disease, starvation, dehydration, heat prostration, untreated wounds, and wanton execution. The deaths of Filipinos to Americans was disproportionately high: approximately 5,000–10,000 Filipino and 600–650 American prisoners of war died on the Bataan Death March. Calugas remained a prisoner at Camp O'Donnell until January 1943, when he was released to work for the Japanese.

=== Post POW release ===
His release placed him as a laborer in a Japanese rice mill, and while assigned there he secretly joined a guerrilla unit, #227 Old Bronco. As an officer of the guerrilla unit, he participated in the attack on the Japanese garrison at Karangalan. His unit fought in the continued campaign against the Japanese, which eventually led to the liberation of the Philippines.

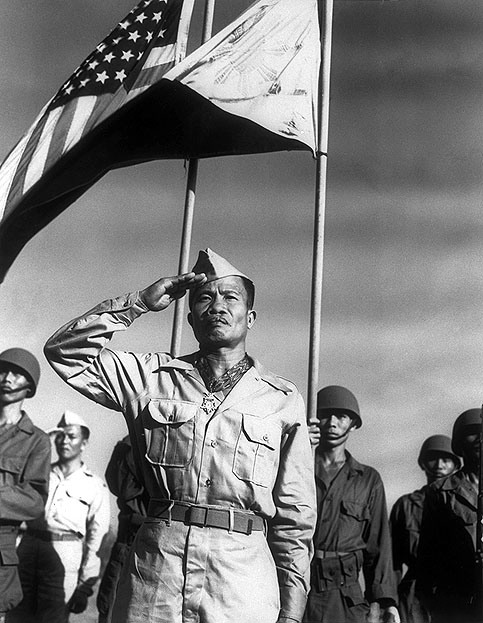
Sergeant Calugas wearing the medal after being awarded it at Camp Olivas.

After the liberation of the Philippines in 1945, he finally received the Medal of Honor for which he had been approved at the beginning of the war. The medal was presented to him by General of the Army George Marshall. Calugas subsequently accepted a direct commission in the United States Army, and was later assigned to the 44th Infantry Regiment, which was assigned with the occupation of Okinawa. After the unit was disbanded in 1947, he was assigned to the Ryuku Command, on the Ryukyu Islands in the South China Sea, where he remained until 1953. He was later assigned to Fort Lewis, Washington.

=== Citizenship ===
Although he had been born in a U.S. territory, and had fought in the United States Army, Calugas was not a citizen. Following the Spanish–American War in 1898, Philippine residents were classified as U.S. nationals rather than citizens. The 1934 Tydings–McDuffie Act, or Philippine Independence Act, reclassified Filipinos as aliens, and set a quota of 50 immigrants per year to the United States, with the exception of those who joined the U.S. Navy, but not the U.S. Army. While serving in Okinawa, Calugas completed the process of becoming a naturalized United States citizen.

== Post-military life ==
Calugas eventually retired from the army with the rank of captain and in 1957 he moved to Tacoma, Washington with his family. He earned a degree in business administration from the University of Puget Sound in 1961 and worked for Boeing. Calugas was involved in several veterans groups within the Seattle and Tacoma area. He died in Tacoma on January 18, 1998, at age 90. His children included Sergeant First Class Jose Calugas Jr. His wife of 52 years died in 1991.

== Medal of Honor citation ==
The action for which the award was made took place near Culis, Bataan Province, Philippine Islands, on 16 January 1942. A battery gun position was bombed and shelled by the enemy until 1 gun was put out of commission and all the cannoneers were killed or wounded. Sgt. Calugas, a mess sergeant of another battery, voluntarily and without orders ran 1,000 yards across the shell-swept area to the gun position. There he organized a volunteer squad which placed the gun back in commission and fired effectively against the enemy, although the position remained under constant and heavy Japanese artillery fire.

== Awards and decorations ==
Calugas earned multiple military decorations before he died, including the Medal of Honor.

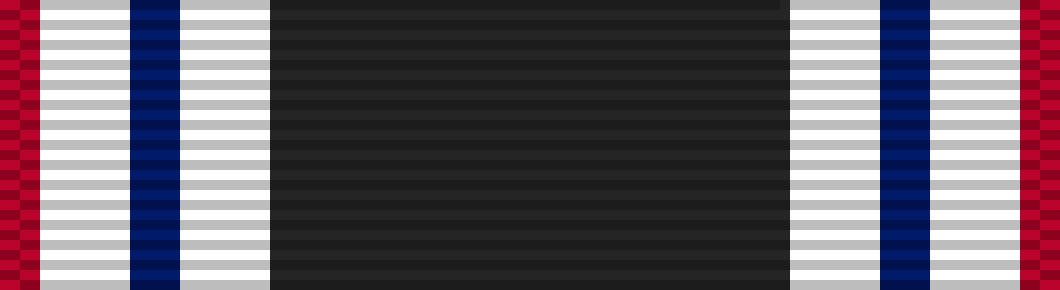

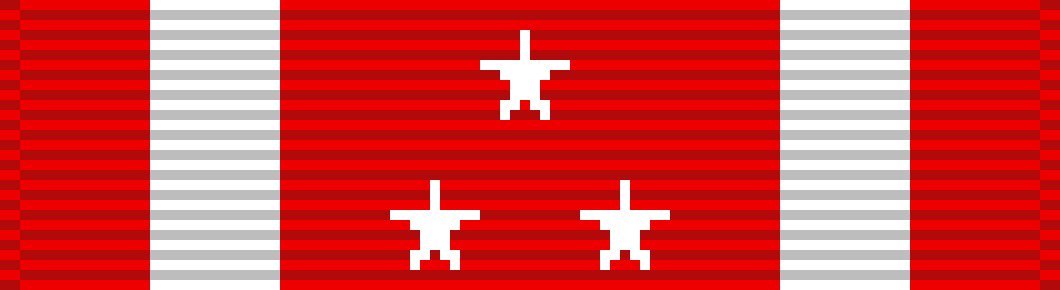

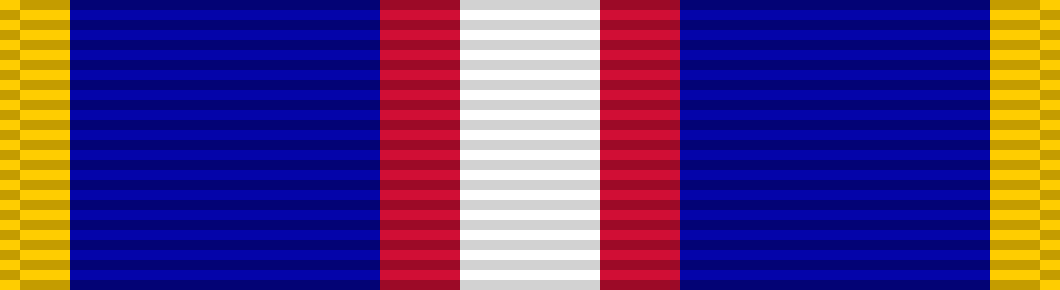

1st row	Medal of Honor	Prisoner of War Medal	Good Conduct Medal with 5 Good Conduct Loops
2nd row	American Defense Service Medal with 'Foreign Service' Clasp	American Campaign Medal	Asiatic Pacific Campaign Medal with 3 Campaign stars
3rd row	World War II Victory Medal	Army of Occupation Medal with 'Japan' clasp	National Defense Service Medal
4th row	Philippine Defense Medal with 1 Campaign star	Philippine Independence Medal	Philippine Liberation Medal with 2 Campaign stars
Unit awards	Presidential Unit Citation with 2 Oak leaf clusters		Philippine Presidential Unit Citation

== Legacy ==
On Mount Samat, there is a relief commemorating the event that lead to the awarding of the Medal of Honor.

Calugas was portrayed by Filipino actor Ronnie Lazaro in a 2003 one-hour Philippine documentary A Legacy of Heroes: The Story of Bataan and Corregidor.

His Medal of Honor was given to the Fort's museum for safekeeping and display by Calugas and his family before his death.

In 2006, a 36-unit apartment building, designed for low-income and disabled residents was dedicated as the "Sgt. Jose Calugas, Sr. Apartments" in High Point, Seattle.

On Memorial Day in 2009, his memory was honored at the Living War Memorial Park on a memorial that had previously been established there.

== See also ==
- List of Asian American Medal of Honor recipients
- List of Asian Americans
- List of Filipino Americans
- List of foreign-born Medal of Honor recipients
- List of Medal of Honor recipients for World War II
- List of people from Iloilo
