= Aniceto Lacson =

President of the Negros Republic from 1898 to 1901

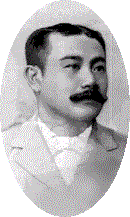

President of the Negros Republic
- In office November 5, 1898 – April 30, 1901
- Preceded by: Position established
- Succeeded by: Melecio Severino (as Civil Governor)

Personal details
- Born: April 15, 1857 Molo, Iloílo, Captaincy General of the Philippines
- Died: February 3, 1931 (aged 73) Talisay, Negros Occidental, Philippine Islands
- Citizenship: Philippine
- Party: Katipunan

Aniceto Lacson y Ledesma (April 15, 1857 – February 3, 1931) was a Filipino revolutionary general, sugar farmer, and businessman. He is known as the first and sole president of the Negros Republic from 1898 to 1901, and for leading the Negros Revolution alongside Juan Araneta.

== Early life ==
A Filipino politician of Chinese Mestizo origin, Gen. Aniceto Lacson, a member of the Lacson family, is the fifth of eight children born to Lucio Lacson y Petronila and Clara Lacson y Ledesma. Lucio's branch of the Lacson family relocated to Negros during the period of diaspora of wealthy Iloilo families at the later part of the 1800s.

Lacson began his early education under private tutelage in Molo, Iloilo, and later pursued commerce at the Ateneo Municipal de Manila, where he was classmates with Juan Araneta and José Rizal. There, he also met Andres Bonifacio, with whom he allegedly shared a secret blood compact with. He was also inducted as a member of Philippine revolutionary society.

Some of Lacson's siblings also contributed to business and local history. He is the brother of Domingo Lacson Sr., the founder of Sta. Clara Estate Inc. and developer of the Sta. Clara Subdivisions, and Don Mariano Lacson, who built the Lacson Ruins of Talisay City, near Aniceto's Casa Grande Mansion. Another sibling, Rosendo Lacson, was a signatory to the ratification of the brief Cantonal Republic of Negros which concluded shortly after the Negros Revolution.

== The Negros Revolution ==
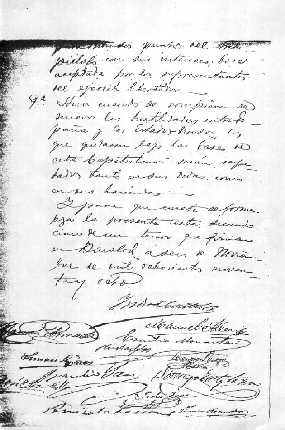
The last page of the Acta de Capitulación (Surrender Document).

Aniceto Lacson was a central figure in the Negros Revolution of 1898, leading the efforts that ultimately liberated Negros Island from Spanish rule. On November 3, 1898, Lacson, serving as the commander of the northern forces, organized a revolt alongside key leaders in Silay, including Juan Araneta, Leandro Locsin Sr., and Nicolás Gólez.

On November 5, 1898, Lacson led his forces in a coordinated uprising that quickly spread across the island. Under his leadership, the revolutionaries in Silay successfully forced the surrender of the local Spanish garrison without resistance. The following day, Lacson's forces advanced on Bacolod City, employing a strategic bluff with makeshift bamboo cannons and wooden rifles.This tactic convinced the Spanish governor, Isidro de Castro, to surrender Bacolod without a fight.

Lacson was a key signatory of the Acta de Capitulación, the document formalizing the Spanish surrender. His leadership was instrumental in the peaceful and decisive conclusion of the Negros Revolution, marking him as a pivotal leader in the island's struggle for independence.

On November 6, 1898, the revolution in Negros ended with the surrender of Spanish forces in Bacolod. The rebels, led by Lacson and Gólez, used bamboo and wooden weapons to convince the Spaniards to surrender. Mediator José Ruiz de Luzuriaga facilitated the agreement, leading to the unconditional surrender of Spanish troops and the transfer of public funds to the new government.

The Spanish signatories were Isidro de Castro, Braulio Sanz, Manuel Abenza, Ramón Armada, Emilio Monasterio, and Domingo Ureta. The Negros revolutionary signatories included Aniceto Lacson, Juan Araneta, Leandro Locsin Sr., Simeón Lizares, Julio Díaz, and José Montilla. Following the surrender, forty-seven prominent Negrenses, such as Antonio L. Jayme, Eusebio Luzuriaga, Nicolas Gólez, Agustín Amenabar, Rafael Ramos, and Rosendo Lacson, ratified a constitution to establish a new republic.

== The Cantonal Republic of Negros ==
Official flag of the Negros Revolution until 1898. The flag was changed when the Negros Republic was established (1898–1901)

The Cantonal Republic of Negros (November 27, 1898 – March 4, 1899) was a short-lived revolutionary government established on the island of Negros in the Philippines. Following the surrender of Spanish Governor Isidro Castro to forces led by Aniceto Lacson and Juan Araneta at Bacolod on November 6, 1898, the Cantonal Republic was founded with Lacson serving as its president from November 27, 1898, until March 4, 1899, when the Negros revolutionaries surrendered to the United States General James Francis Smith. The government lasted for three months and four days.

== Historical legacy ==
Aniceto Lacson and fellow revolutionaries are commemorated through the Cinco de Noviembre celebration and historic landmarks in Negros Occidental.

=== Cinco de Noviembre ===
Cinco de Noviembre celebrates the revolution led by Aniceto Lacson and Juan Araneta on November 5, 1898, which led to the peaceful surrender of Spanish forces in Bacolod. Lacson's leadership and strategic bluff with makeshift weapons were pivotal in this bloodless victory.

The day is marked annually in Negros Occidental as a special holiday. The Cinco de Noviembre memorial in Silay City, featuring a Spanish cannon donated by Claudio G. Akol Jr., honors Lacson and the revolutionaries. President Corazon Aquino declared November 5 a holiday through Republic Act No. 6709.

=== The Fountain of Justice ===
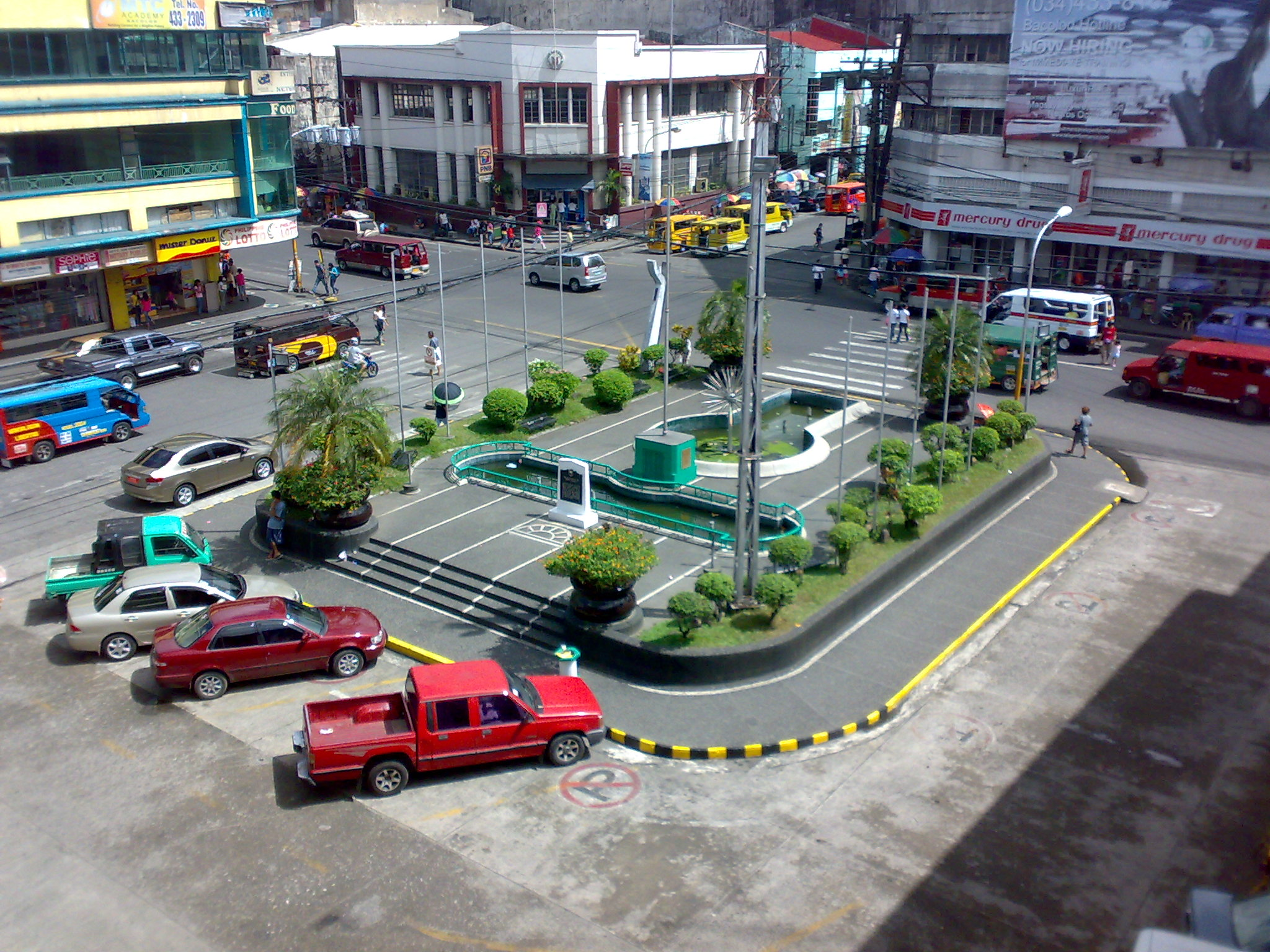
View of the Fountain of Justice from a high point in the old Bacolod City Hall building

Situated in front of the old Bacolod City Hall, the Fountain of Justice is a historic landmark in Bacolod, Negros Occidental, Philippines that commemorates the Spanish surrender to Gen. Aniceto Lacson's forces during the Negros Revolution. It is also the location of where José de Luzuriaga's house once stood.

On November 6, 1898, during the Negros Revolution, Luzuriaga’s house served as the site of the surrender of Bacolod by Spanish authorities to the Filipino forces led by Gen. Aniceto Lacson. He also served as a mediator between the two sides.

Colonel Isidro de Castro, the Spanish governor of Negros, signed the surrender document on behalf of the Spanish forces.

The Fountain of Justice was a spot for recreation, political events, spiritual gatherings, and cultural celebrations. It previously served as a popular venue for rallies and protests and hosted Bacolod City's 66th Charter Anniversary celebration.

=== Lacson National Highway ===
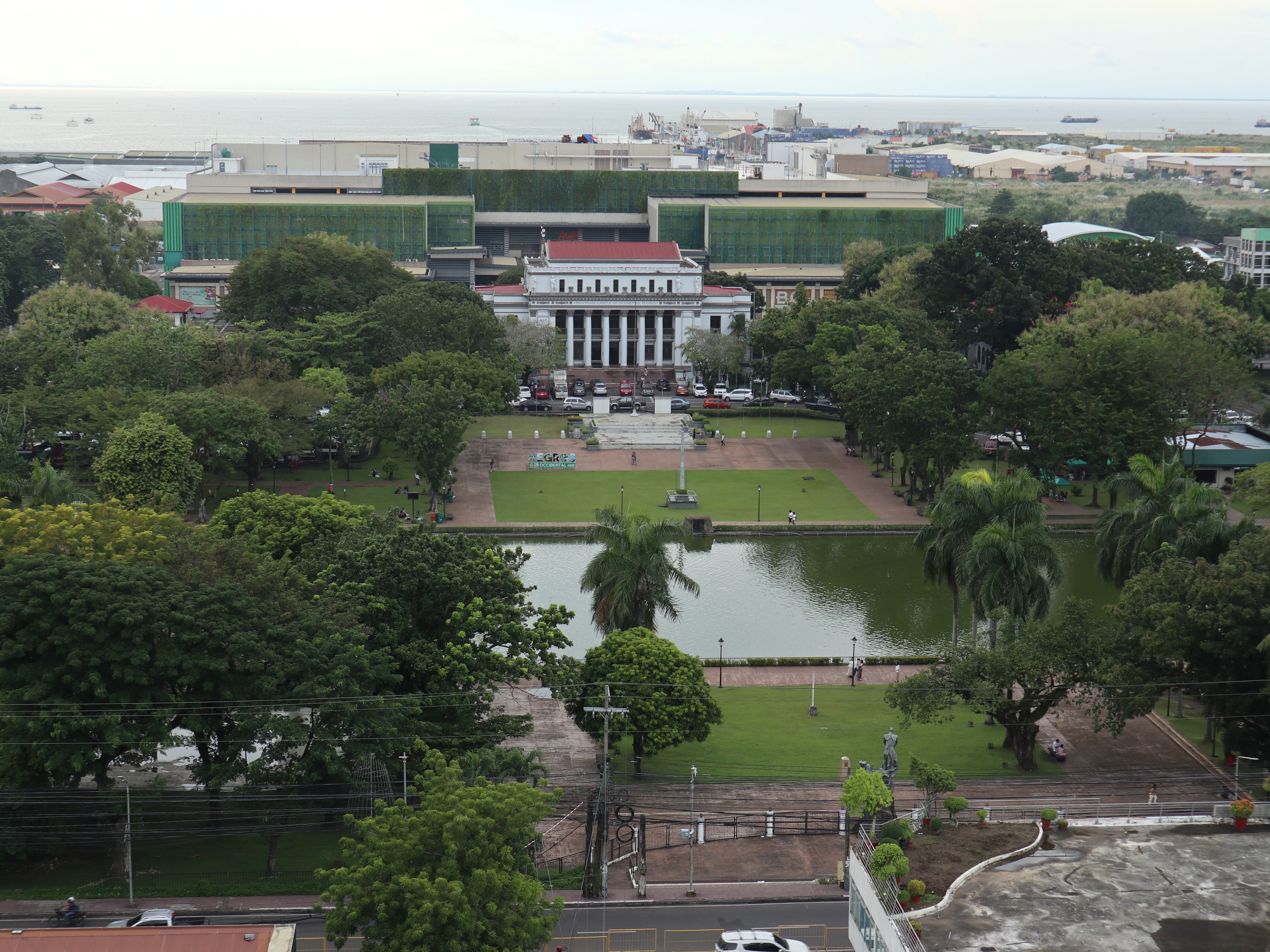
Aerial view of Lacson National Highway, parallel to the Capitol Park and Lagoon

Lacson National Highway, known locally as Lacson Street, is the primary thoroughfare in Bacolod City, named in honor of Gen. Aniceto Lacson.

Originally a non-concrete road lined with vintage houses, Lacson National Highway transformed into a commercial and business center during the mid-20th century sugar industry boom.

Notable townships and developments, including Sta. Clara Subdivision owned by Aniceto's brother Domingo Lacson Sr., and Capitolville by industrialist Alfredo Montelibano Sr., further enhanced the importance of the area.

Lacson National Highway also serves as the main road for the celebration of Masskara Festival and Bacalaodiat.

== Properties ==
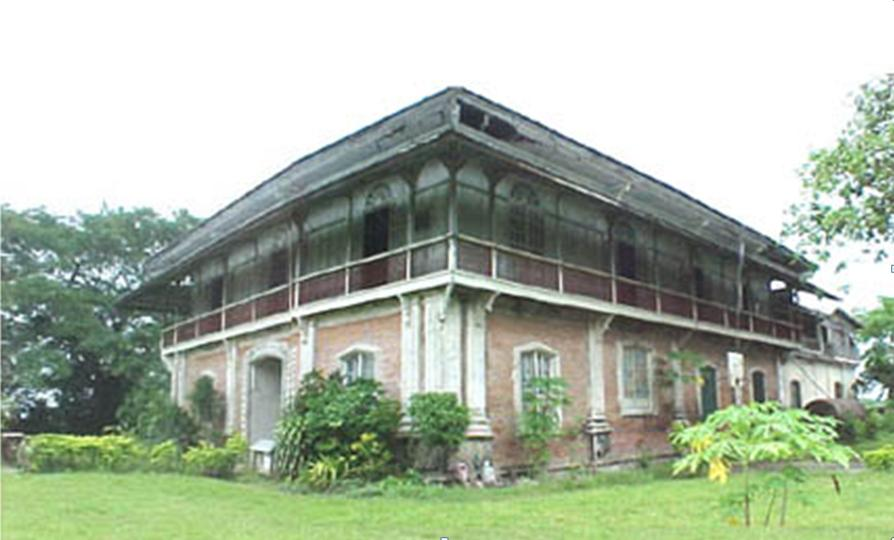
General Aniceto Lacson House, popularly known as Casa Grande

After graduating commerce from the Ateneo Municipal de Manila, Aniceto improved his father's sugar plantation in Talisay, Negros Occidental. He expanded the estate through purchases from English businessman Nicholas Loney.

On 29 August 1898, Belgian Consul Édouard André described witnessing the mistreatment of workers in Negros, where laborers on Aniceto Lacson's estate were punished with bamboo lashes, sometimes up to one hundred lashes.

In 1916, Aniceto Lacson appealed to register ownership of Sicogon Island, claiming it from Ynchausti & Co. during the Spanish colonial period. He acquired it from Ramon Fontanet, but key documents were lost in fires during the Philippine Revolution. Despite opposition, Lacson secured agreements for public use. The court ruled in his favor, recognizing his long-term possession and allowing the registration of the island's agricultural areas.

Barangay Bata, originally owned by the Lacson family in Hacienda Lourdes, is situated between Bacolod and Talisay in Negros Occidental. Named "BATA" from "BA" for Bacolod and "TA" for Talisay, the land was sold to Irish national Charles Newton Hodges, who converted it from agricultural to residential. Due to foreign ownership restrictions, much of the property was foreclosed by PCI Bank. Businessman Simplicio A. Palanca later acquired and developed it, establishing Bata Subdivision and Marapara Golf and Country Club (now Negros Occidental Golf and Country Club). The Lacsons under their company, Teresa Development Corporation, developed Goldcrest Subdivision and Rose Lawns Memorial Park.

Currently, Lacson's heirs, in collaboration with developers, have established projects like La Costa Brava, Del Rio, Town and Country, and Ayala North Point. The family still holds land for future investments. Lacson's mansion in Talisay City, Negros Occidental, known as Casa Grande was inherited by his descendants, the Claparols family. In the year 2002, it was declared a National Historical Landmark.

On November 5, 2024, during the 126th Cinco de Noviembre celebration, the Lacson-Claparols heirs donated Casa Grande to the National Museum of the Philippines. The NMP will restore the historic house, preserving it as a national heritage site and museum.

== Family ==
Aniceto Lacson's family was notably large, with two marriages and over twenty children, his wives and descendants connect him to many other prominent families, strengthening their influence in the Philippines.

=== Marriage to Rosario Araneta ===
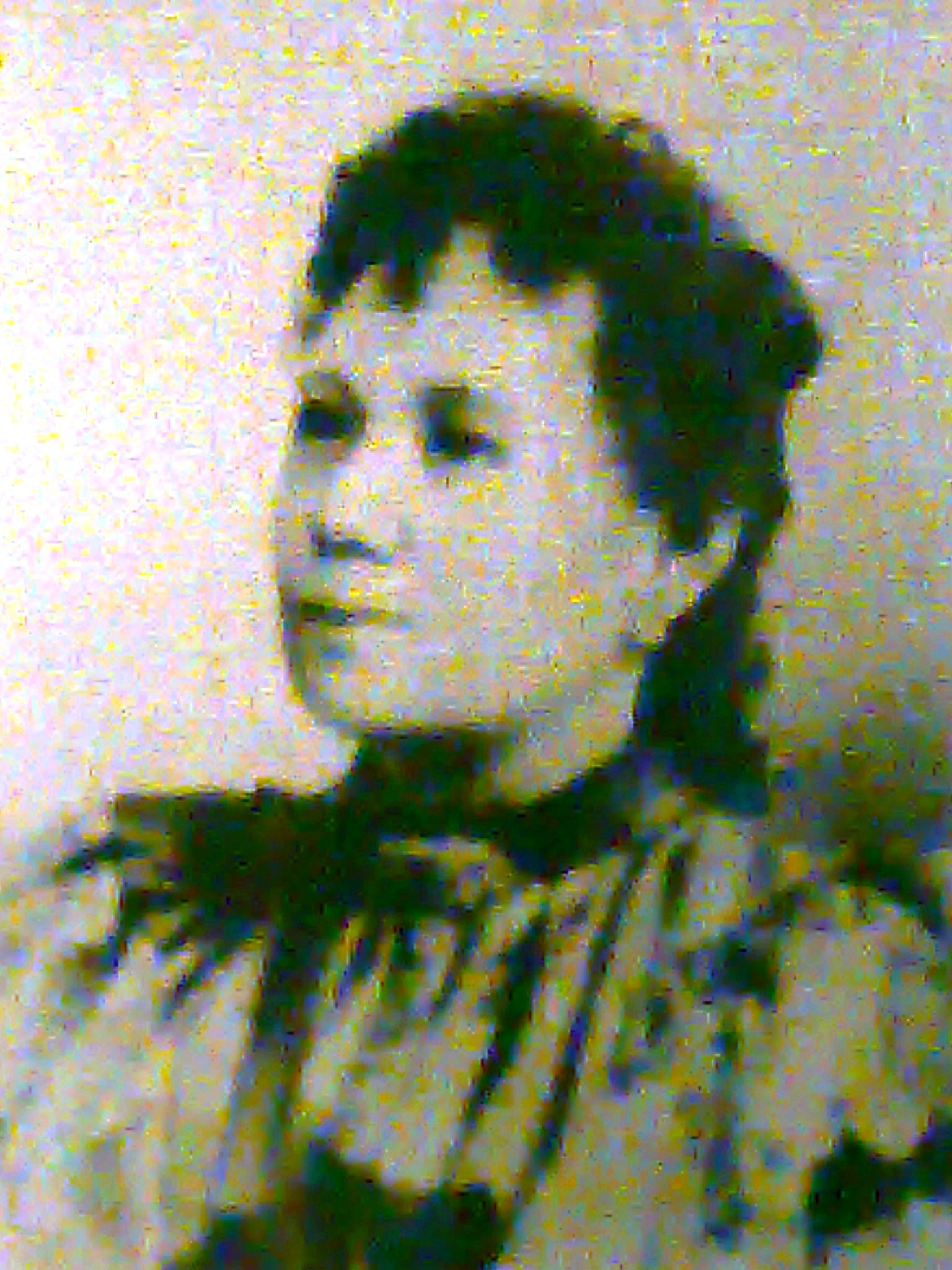
Rosario Araneta, a descendant of the Araneta Clan of the Philippines. She was Lacson’s first wife.

Aniceto first married Rosario Araneta, the daughter of Patricio Cabunsol Araneta and Leoncia Araneta. She was first cousins with Juan Araneta. Aniceto and Rosario had eleven children:

1. Jesusa, the eldest, married José María Lacson Arroyo y Pidal, her second cousin. Jesusa and José are the grandparents of Iggy Arroyo, and First Gentleman Mike Arroyo, husband of President Gloria Macapagal-Arroyo.
2. Emilio, died young
3. Clotilde, died young
4. Carmen, married Ricardo Claparols, a Spaniard whose son, Dr. Jaime Lacson Claparols, who later founded JRS Express in 1960
5. Enriqueta, married Domingo Lacson II, son of Domingo Lacson Sr. of Sta. Clara Estate, Inc.
6. Isaác, who became Governor of Negros, then congressman and senator of the Republic, married Carmen Paterno, a niece of diplomat Pedro Paterno
7. Mariano, married Lilia Montilla
8. Perfecta, married Santiago Franco
9. José, died young
10. Aniceto Jr., married Aurora Lacson, a cousin
11. Dominador, married Visitación Lacson, a cousin

=== Marriage to Magdalena Torres ===
With his second wife, Magdalena Torres, a Spanish mestiza, he sired 10 children:

1. Resurrección, married Carlos Sackermann, a German
2. Margarita, a former Miss Negros Occidental, married William Gemperle, a Swiss-German
3. Leonila, married Ángel Gamboa
4. Leoncia
5. Nicolás, married Amparo Lacson, the sister of Mayor of Manila Arsenio Lacson. They are the parents of Australian-Filipino socialite Rose Lacson, and Salvador Lacson, the founder of Lacson & Lacson Insurance Brokers Inc.
6. Juan, married Reymunda Villareal
7. José, married Estelita Adrias
8. Lucio, married Consuelo Flores
9. Luis, married Lily Distajo
10. Consuelo, married Sebastián Corro, a Spaniard

== Ancestry ==
Ancestors of Aniceto Lacson

Lorenzo Lacson
Juan Lacson
Josefina Cuaño
Domingo Lacson
Manuela Dominga
Lucio Lacson
Fernanda Petronila
Aniceto Lacson
Clara Ledesma

== See also ==
- Negros Revolution
- Republic of Negros
- Fountain of Justice
- Isaac Lacson
- Arsenio Lacson
- Eugenio Jose Lacson
- Lacson Ruins
- Lacson family of the Philippines
- Ancestral Houses of the Philippines
- List of Political families in the Philippines

Political offices
New title Republic established	President of the Republic of Negros	Succeeded by Melecio Severino as Civil Governor of Negros Island
