= Republic of Negros =

1898–1901 Philippine revolutionary polity

Coordinates: 10°N 123°E

Republic of Negros Republika sañg Negros (Hiligaynon) Republika sa Negros (Cebuano) República de Negros (Spanish)
- 1898–1901
- Flag

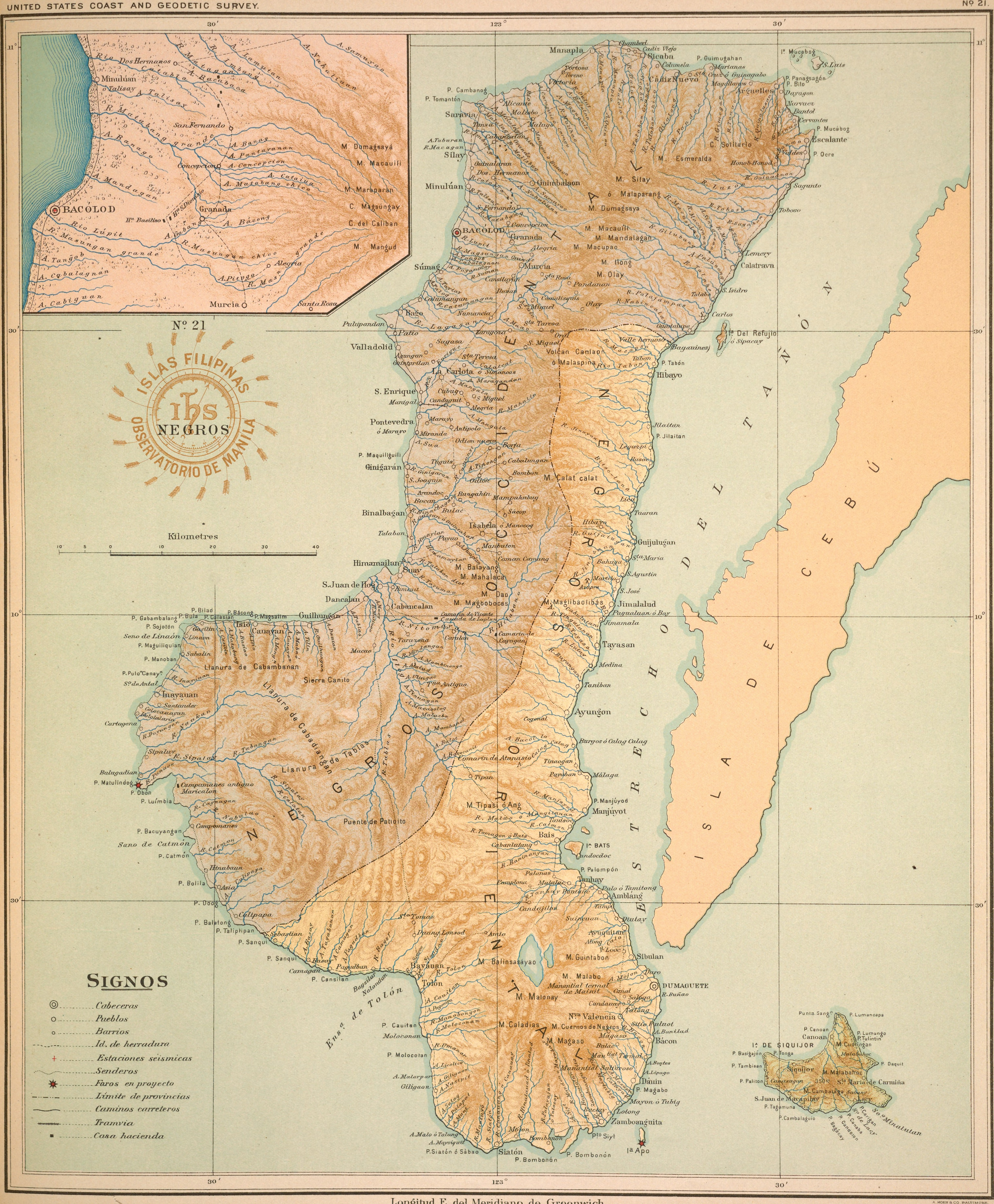
- Location of the Republic of Negros in green Map of Negros Island in 1900
- Status: Provisional Revolutionary Government (1898); Constituent of the Federal State of the Visayas (1898–1899); U.S. protectorate (1899–1901)
- Capital: Bacólod
- Common languages: Hiligaynon, Cebuano and Spanish
- Government: Republican canton
- President
  - 1898–1899: Aniceto Lacson
- Governor-General of the Provinces
  - 1899–1901: Melecio Severino
- President of the Chamber of Deputies
  - 1899–1899: José Ruíz de Luzuriaga
- Legislature: Chamber of Deputies
- Historical era: New Imperialism
  - End of the Negros Revolution: November 27, 1898
  - Annexation to the Philippine Islands: April 20, 1901
- Currency: Spanish milled dollar
Preceded by	Succeeded by
Spanish East Indies; Federal State of the Visayas	Federal State of the Visayas; Military Government of the Philippine Islands
- Today part of: Philippines

The Republic of Negros (Hiligaynon: Republika sang Negros; Cebuano: Republika sa Negros; Spanish: República de Negros) was a short-lived revolutionary entity which had existed on the island of Negros first as a canton of the First Philippine Republic and later as a protectorate of the United States.

== Nomenclature ==
The entity had gone by multiple names throughout its short existence: the Negros Canton (Hiligaynon: Kanton sg Negros; Cebuano: Kanton sa Negros; Spanish: Cantón de Negros) of the First Philippine Republic, and the Federal Republic of Negros (Hiligaynon: Republikang Federal sg Negros; Cebuano: Republikang Federal sa Negros; Spanish: República Federal de Negros) or Federal State of Negros (Hiligaynon: Estadong Federal sg Negros; Cebuano: Estadong Federal sa Negros; Spanish: Estado Federal de Negros) under U.S. protection. According to Gregorio Zaide, the protectorate had been annexed to the Philippine Islands as simply the Republic of Negros.

== History ==
Official flag of the Negros Revolution until 1898. The flag was changed when the Negros Republic was established (1898–1901)

From November 3 to 6, 1898, the Negrenses began to revolt against the Spanish Empire‘a colonial government, headed locally by politico-military governor Colonel Isidro de Castro. The Spaniards decided to surrender upon seeing armed troops marching in a pincer movement towards Bacolod, the chief city of the island. The revolutionaries, led by Generals Juan Araneta, from Bago and Aniceto Lacson, from Talisay, were actually carrying fake arms consisting of rifles carved from palm fronds and cannons of rolled bamboo mats painted black, and cannonballs of coconuts painted black. On 5 November, Spanish officials surrendered themselves to native troops. A provisional government was then established with Aniceto Lacson as President, and a notice of this was transmitted by Melecio Severino to President Emilio Aguinaldo on Luzon. On November 27, 1898, the unicameral Congress of Deputies (Spanish: Congreso de Diputados) met in Bacólod and declared the establishment of the Republican Canton of Negros (Spanish: Cantón Republicano de Negros). The Congress of Deputies acted as a constituent assembly to draft a constitution.

Motivated by either economic interests or sheer realpolitik, the hacendero-led cantonal government surrendered to invading U.S. forces on March 4, 1899, following the outbreak of hostilities between the nascent First Philippine Republic and the U.S. military government which had been established during the Spanish–American War, and came under U.S. protection on April 30, 1899 as a territory separate from the Philippine Islands. A constitution for a Federal Republic of Negros, which proposed two governors, a U.S. military governor and a civil governor elected by voters of Negros, was framed by a committee sitting in Bacólod and sent to General Otis in Manila, proclaimed to take effect on October 2, 1899. The Negros government operated smoothly under this constitution until the province of Occidental Negros was established on April 20, 1901, and annexed to the Philippine Islands by the United States simply as the "Republic of Negros".

=== Leaders ===
The leaders of the short-lived republic were:

General Aniceto Lacson y Ledesma (November 5, 1898 - November 27, 1898); November 5, 1898 - July 22, 1899	(President in Negros Occidental only until November 27, 1898) de facto President
Demetrio Larena y Sandes (November 24, 1898 - November 27, 1898); November 5, 1898 - July 22, 1899	(President in Negros Oriental only) de facto Vice-President
Don José Ruiz de Luzuriaga y Guiquín; July 22, 1899 - November 6, 1899	President of the Chamber of Deputies
Don Eusebio Ruiz de Luzuriaga y Ramos	Secretary of the Treasury
General Simeón Lizares y Montebón	de facto Secretary of the Interior
Nicolás Gólez y Coloso	Secretary of Development and Public Works
Don Agustín Amenábar	Secretary of Agriculture and Commerce
Capitán Juan Anacleto Araneta y Torres	Secretary of War
Antonio Jayme y Ledesma; July 24, 1854 - October 9, 1937	Secretary of Justice
Melecio Severino é Yorac; November 6, 1899 - April 30, 1901	de facto Governor-General of the Provinces

== Commemoration ==
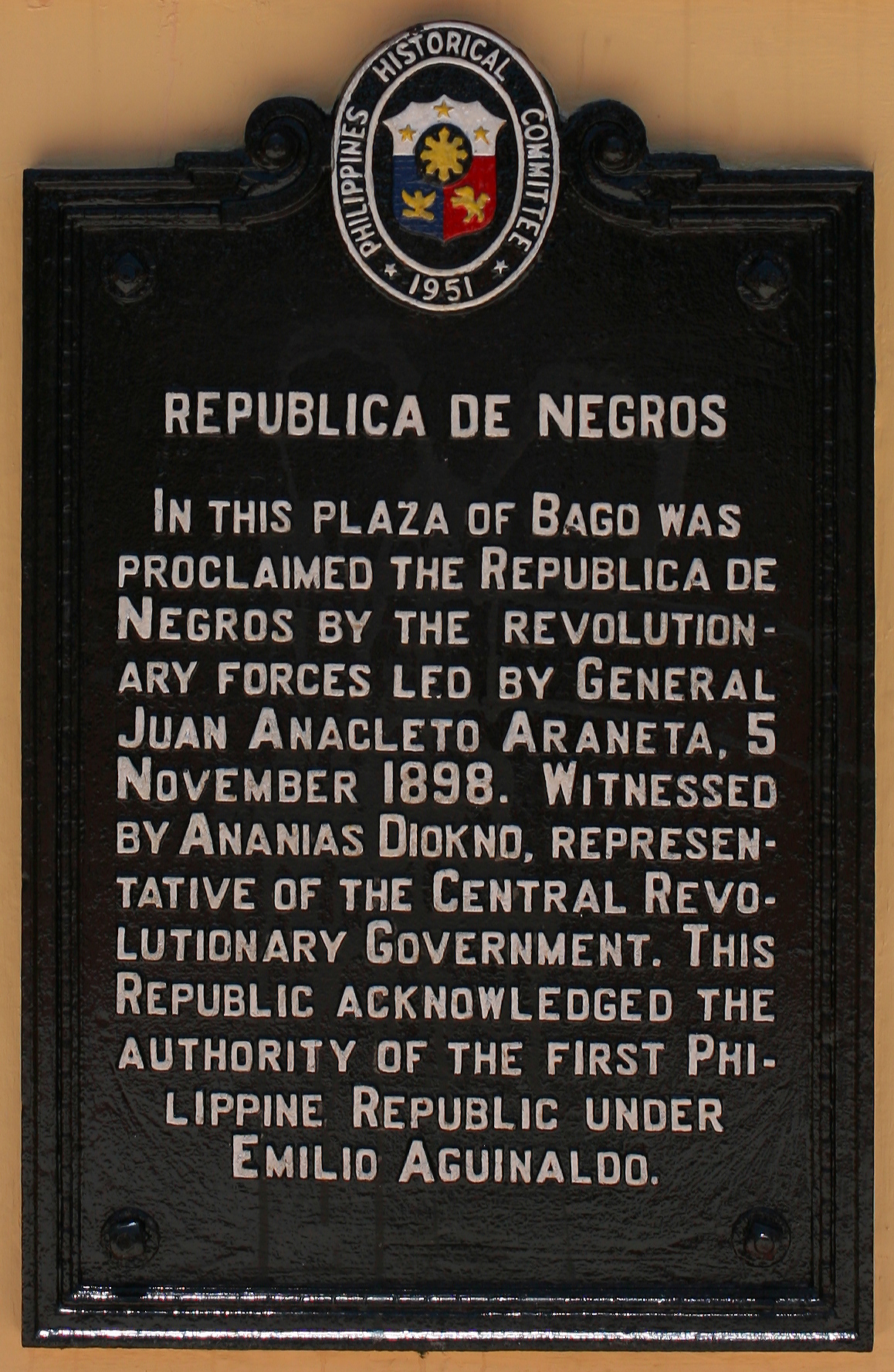
Historical marker commemorating the republic in Bago

November 5, popularly referred to by the Negrenses as Cinco de Noviembre, has been officially observed since 1989 as a special non-working holiday in Negros Occidental. The republic itself has been commemorated in a historical marker in the main square of Bago, on which is inscribed:

REPÚBLICA DE NEGROS

In this plaza of Bago was proclaimed the República de Negros by the revolutionary forces led by general Juan Anacleto Araneta, 5 November 1898. Witnessed by Ananías Diokno, representative of the Central Revolutionary Government. This Republic acknowledged the authority of the First Philippine Republic under Emilio Aguinaldo.
