= Magdalena Villaruz =

Filipino entrepreneur and inventor

Magdalena Smith Villaruz (born 1934) is an entrepreneur and inventor from the Philippines. Originally a rice farmer, she went on to help agricultural technology by creating the turtle hand tractor and other inventions.

In February 1986, Villaruz was awarded the WIPO Gold Medal in Metro Manila for her inventions of the turtle hand tractor (also known as the power cultivator) and several others. In July 1995, she was awarded another WIPO Gold Medal in Cebu, Philippines for various inventions, including the screen type thresher. Her inventions have helped the advancement of Philippine agricultural technology.

== Patented Inventions ==
- Turtle power tiller
- Rice thresher rush
- Leveling device
- Diaphragm pump
- Dual diaphragm pump
- (Improved) power cultivators
- Household rice huller
- (Improved) corn sheller
- (Simplified) hand tractor
- Combination harrow-leveler
- Floating operator's seat
- Adjustable engine mount
- Three-wheeled vehicle with passenger seats
- (Improved) power cultivator assembly
- Blower for thresher discharge ejector
- Two-speed transmission assembly for power
- Improved windmill

== Recognition and awards ==
- WIPO Gold Medal 1986 - Best Inventor
- WIPO Gold Medal 1995 - Best Woman Inventor

== Organizations and Affiliations ==
- Philippine Invention Development Institute (PIDI)
- Technology Application and Promotion Institute, Department of Science and Technology (TAPI/DOST)
- United Nations Development Organization (UNIDO)
- National Agricultural & Fishery Council (NAFC)
- Experts on Technical Cooperation for Developing Countries (TCDC)
- ASEAN Productivity Center, Development Academy of the Philippines
