= Villa Angela Estates =

Project
- Opening date: 2015 (as consolidated mixed development estate)
- Developer: Fernando F. Gonzaga, Inc.
- Operator: Angela Estate, Inc.
- Owner: Fernando F. Gonzaga, Inc.

Location
- Interactive map of Villa Angela Estates
- Coordinates: 10°40′35.7″N 122°57′1.2″E
- Location: Brgy. Estefania, Bacolod, Negros Occidental, Philippines

Villa Angela Estates, otherwise called Villa Angela City and formerly called Villa Angela Business District, is a mixed-use residential and commercial estate, located in Brgy. Estefania, Bacolod. Previously separate developments located in the property of the late Don Fernando F. Gonzaga, it was consolidated into a single planned estate managed by the heirs through Fernando F. Gonzaga Estate, Inc.

== Residential ==
Helvetia Subdivision, named after the former hacienda it encompasses, and Villa Angela forms the pioneer real estate business component of Villa Angela City Estate, predating the consolidated estate itself. The two gated residential villages were formed from previously farmland, also named "Hacienda Helvetia," supplying sugarcane to the now defunct Bacolod-Murcia Milling Company. Riverwalk Villa Angela is the estate's newest residential development, named after a small river bordering the property.

Located inside Villa Angela Subdivision is Trinity Christian School, a Chinese Evangelical Christian institution operated by the United Evangelical Church of the Philippines-affiliated Trinity Church.

== Commercial ==
=== Villa Angela Arcade ===
Villa Angela Arcade, along with Villa Angela Strip, form the estate's first commercial development and anchor, to complement Lopues East, a local mall, located across the street. It houses a spa facility, a branch of the Social Security System and Savemore Market, a supermarket run by the SM Group, while Villa Angela Strip houses both food, service and office establishments. Like the residential development, it predates the establishment of Villa Angela Estates.

=== Villa Angela East Block ===
Villa Angela East Block became the first IT block in Western Visayas, when the city was still part of the region. Its establishment prompted the Fernando F. Gonzaga Estate, Inc. to consolidate their commercial establishments, in preparation to the eventual transfer of the government seat from the Old City Hall to the nearby Government Center. East Block houses a BPO facility, a bank and gaming companies. Panasiatic Solutions became the first BPO tenant, building their own facility on two sites in the area, with the first one along the highway and the other situated beside the Government Center. Both sites necessitated the development of Eastwalk and Boxes at Villa Angela, a food strip development housing artisan and homegrown restaurants.

=== The Hi-Strip ===
A series of low-rise commercial strips, five buildings forming part of The Hi Strip were constructed along the Circumferential Road. Hi-Strip 1, frontsthe Government Center, while the Hi-Strip 5 fronts the Villa Angela East Block. It houses both local and international brands, mostly catering to food establishments and spa facilities, along with BPO training centers. 7-Eleven became the anchor convenience store serving the BPO employees in the area.

== Government ==
=== Bacolod Government Center ===
Bacolod Government Center, formerly called the "New Government Center or simply NGC", was built on land donated by Fernando F. Gonzaga Estate, Inc. to the City Government of Bacolod on June 13, 2006. The neo-classical renaissance building sits on 5 hectares of land, and constitutes the centerpiece of the estate's development, envisioned to spur development to the area as the "next downtown area."
