= Binukot =

Tradition in the Philippines

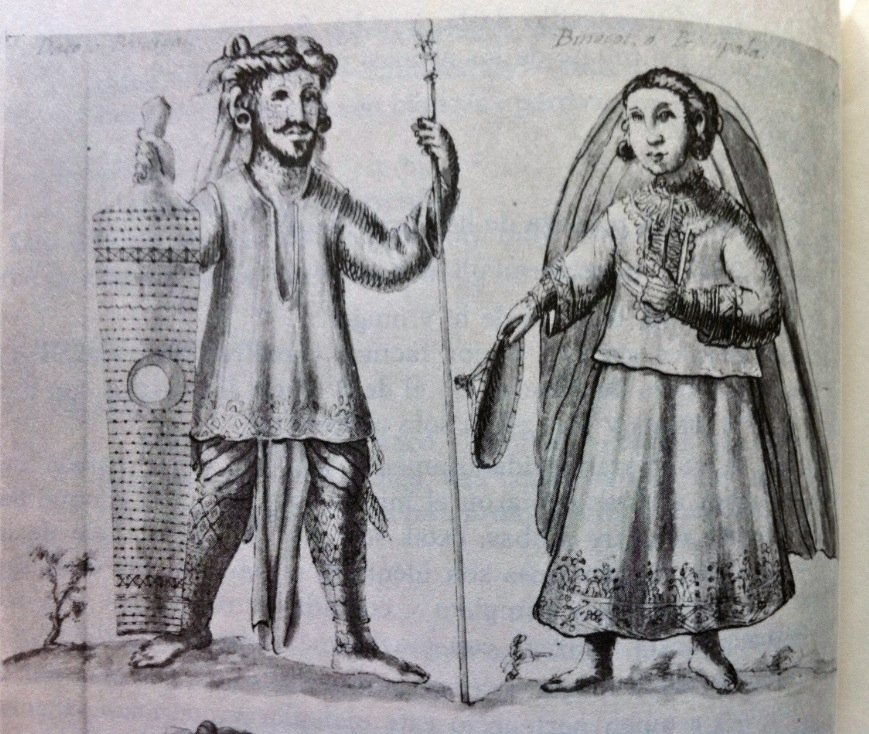
An illustration from Historia de las Islas e Indios de Bisayas (1668) by Francisco Ignacio Alcina depicting a Visayan datu and a binukot noblewoman with a veil (alampay) and a sadok

Binukot, also spelled Binokot, is a pre-colonial Visayan tradition from the Philippines that secludes a young woman with the expectation that seclusion will result in a higher value placed on the girl by marital suitors in the future. It originally applied to young noblewomen. The name literally means "wrapped up" or "veiled" in Visayan languages, in the sense of seclusion.

The practice survived until recently among the Samarnon (Panay Bukidnon) people, descendants of the ancient Visayans who escaped Spanish conversion. They kept women from the public eye beginning in childhood. Most Binukot are unmarried for their entire life, however, if a binukot is married, she will immediately become a Nabukot (one who was a Binukot). A man marrying a Binukot should possess a hard-working and loving nature and has the capability to love, cherish, and treasure his wife for all of time as the Binukot that would turn into a Nabukot has no knowledge in caring for herself as she is usually raised and supported for the entirety of her life. The Binukot and Nabukot are both major cultural bearers of the Panay Bukidnon people as they have a vast knowledge on their people's epics, which is their expertise, along with the traditional practices of a Binukot.

== Etymology ==
Binukot, when used as an adjective, means "wrapped up", "confined," "secluded," or "restricted" in Visayan languages. Its root word, bukot, means "to cover or swaddle oneself [with cloth]."

== The practice ==
Binukot is a pre-Hispanic practice in the Philippine archipelago that is still practiced. A tribe or community deems a girl worthy of being secluded in order to protect them so they gain cultural prestige and are more appealing to high-class suitors. The chosen one is secluded, well-kept, pampered, treasured, and to some level revered.

A Binukot is secluded by her parents at the age of three or four. The Binukot is not exposed to sun or allowed to work and is accompanied by her parents when she bathes. This practice results in a fair, frail, fine-complexioned, and long-haired woman. At home, her parents and grandparents entertain her with oral lore and traditional dances. This traditional entertainment can make a Binukot a proficient chanter and knowledgeable in oral history.

Traditionally, a Binukot must not be seen by any man from childhood until puberty. Only family members and female servants, called apid, may come face-to-face with her. She often bathes in the evening in order to keep her away from men’s eyes, as well as to shield her from the sun. A makeshift enclosure may also be made for her to bathe in the river for the same purpose. Men can be punished by death if they look at a female Binukot without authorization.

The Binukot is not allowed to do heavy work but may weave in her room. She is provided with female servants to do other work for her.

When a Binukot is ready for marriage, often at age 13 or 14 or younger, her parents ask for a high pangayu (Hiligaynon: bride price or dowry) from the family of the suitor. A Binukot with high pangayu often brings prestige to a family. Even when a suitor visits a Binukot, the parents of the Binukot entertain the suitor and she is kept inside her room—but she can show the tip of her fingernail.

== Image of a Binukot ==
Binukotan (plural for binukot) are described in epics and tales using metaphors such as "visage of the sun," "appeared like the sun," "shone like a star," "pale as the moon," and "incomparably beautiful," which suggests that the Binukot is a standard of aesthetic beauty.

A Binukot is said to be the most beautiful maiden in her community. She has a fair to white complexion and dresses in ankle length skirts and long-sleeved blouses that appear to be richly embroidered (Panubok) at the collar, cuffs, and hem.

The Binukot of Panay-Bukidnon wears jewelry made from Spanish coins that are strung together and called biningkit. A waistband of coins is called a wagkus, and a headdress of coins is known as a pundong.

== Known Binukotan ==
- Hugan-an – Met by F. Landa Jocano. She retold the 30-hour-long Hinilawod epic.
- Anggoran (Christian name: Preciosa “Susa” Caballero) – Met by Alicia P. Magos. Retold 2 epics.
- Lola Elena Gardoce
- Conchita Gilbaliga
