= Ramona Go =

Filipina brigadier-general and mayor

Mayor of San Enrique, Iloilo
- In office 2013–2016
- Preceded by: Rosario Mediatrix P. Fernandez
- Succeeded by: Rosario Mediatrix P. Fernandez

Personal details
- Born: San Dionisio, Iloilo, Philippines
- Citizenship: Philippines
- Party: Liberal
- Education: Central Philippine University; Asian Institute of Management

Military service
- Allegiance: Philippines
- Branch/service: Philippine Army
- Years of service: 1982–2012
- Rank: Brigadier general

Ramona Go was the first female brigadier general in the regular (non-technical) Filipino armed forces (first female General in the Philippine Army). In May 2013, she was elected mayor of San Enrique.

She also serves as a Consul General to the United Nations of the Philippines.

== Early life and education ==
Ramona Go was born in San Dionisio, Iloilo. She received her Bachelor of Science degree in chemistry from Central Philippine University in 1977 and has a masters in development management from the Asian Institute of Management.

== Military career ==
Go attended the Women's Royal Australian Army Corps officer candidate course in Georges Heights, New South Wales, and upon completion in 1982 was commissioned as an officer in the Women's Auxiliary Corps of the Armed Forces of the Philippines.

Go served as a platoon leader in the corps at Camp Aguinaldo and a tactical officer in several military units. She has passed army courses for intelligence officers, airborne forces, finance officers, armor officers, technical services command and the general staff course. Go was once commander of the aviation battalion of the Light Armor Division. She has served as head of several military tribunals and was also adjutant general of the armed forces. She was promoted to brigadier general on 4 April 2011 upon her appointment to deputy chief of staff for personnel. She is the first female regular army officer to be promoted to general rank (previous female generals had come from the technical branch, e.g. nursing). Go was also the first female military pilot, first female line officer, first female adjutant general and the first female battalion commander in the Philippines.

== Political career ==
Go retired from the army after 33 years service in September 2012, 6 months ahead of her compulsory retirement date to begin a political career. She became a Liberal Party member and stood for election as mayor of San Enrique in the 16 May 2013 local elections. She won the seat with a majority of more than 1,800 votes.
