= Magdalena Jalandoni =

Filipino feminist writer (1891-1978)

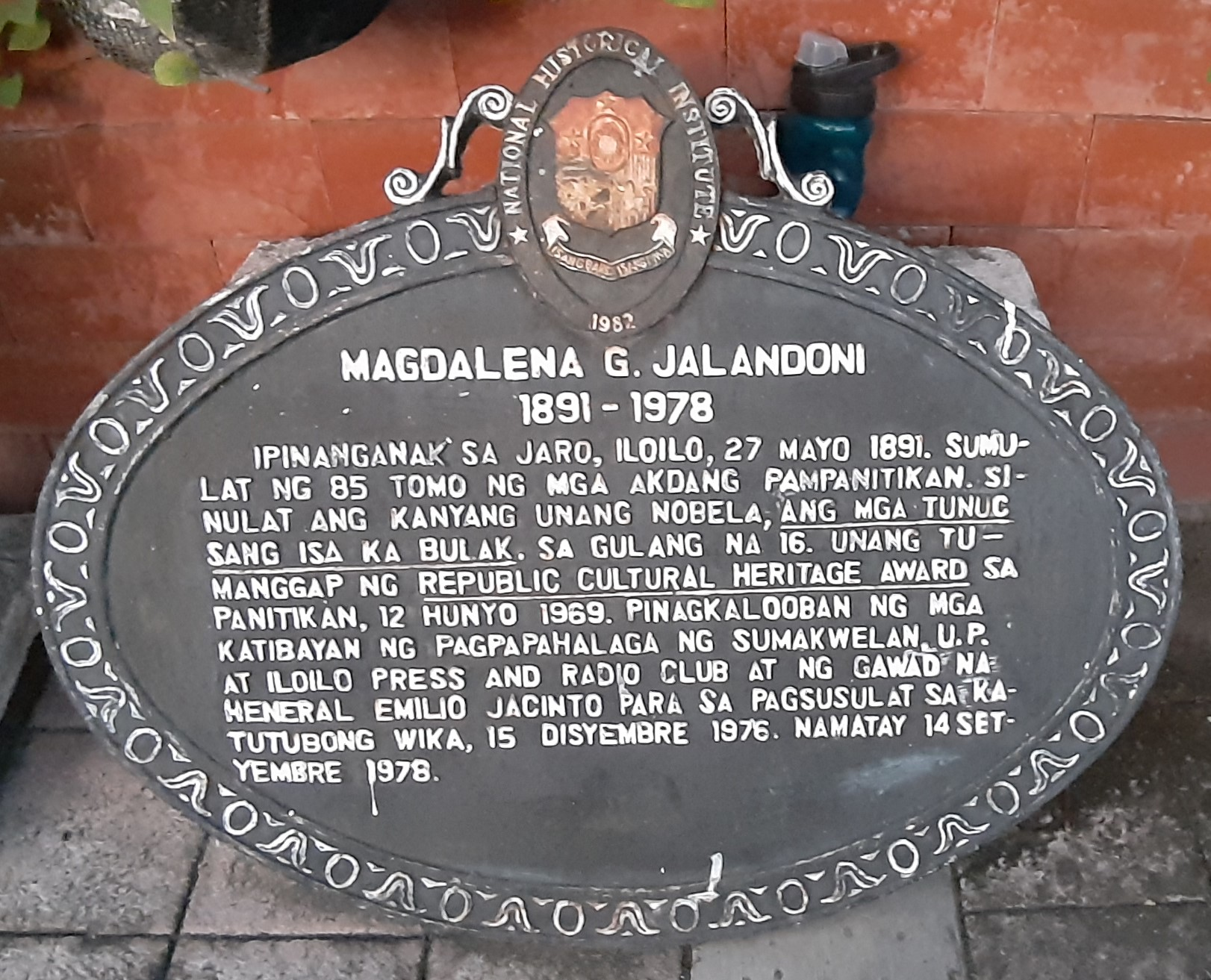
Historical marker created by the National Historical Institute in 1982 and placed in Jaro, Iloilo City

Magdalena Gonzaga Jalandoni (May 27, 1891, in Jaro, Iloilo – September 14, 1978, in Jaro, Iloilo) was a Filipino novelist, playwright, short story writer, poet, sculptor and painter. She is now remembered as one of the most prolific Filipino writers in the Hiligaynon language. Hailing from Western Visayas, her works are said to have left permanent and significant milestones in Philippine literature.

== Biography ==
Magdalena Jalandoni was born on May 27, 1891, to an affluent land-owning family of Gregorio Jalandoni and Francisca Gonzaga in Calle Alvarez now renamed as Calle Benedicto in the former city of Salog now Jaro, Iloilo City, a present-day district of Iloilo City. She began writing at a young age wherein she already had her poems published at the age of 12. She published her first novel Ang Mga Tunoc Sang Isa Ca Bulac (The Thorns of a Flower), which was later followed by many novels, compilations of poems and short stories. Jalandoni only wrote for publication purposes due to the male-dominated society at the time. Back then, female voices in literature were not taken seriously by the general public. Although her mother strictly forbade her to take literature seriously, she refused to do so and devoted her life entirely to literature.

In her childhood autobiography, Ang Matam-is Kong Pagkabata (My Sweet Childhood), she cites: "I will be forced to write when I feel that my nose is being assaulted by the scent of flowers, when my sight is filled with the promises of the sun and when my soul is lifted by winged dreams to the blue heavens."

== Works ==
Her famous poem, Ang Guitara (The Guitar), is read in classrooms all over the country today. Literary critics and historians claim that she has mastered a special talent for poetry and description as well as dramatic evocations of landscapes and events in her novels and short stories. Her works span from the coming of Malay settlers in the Middle Ages up to the Spanish and American colonial era as well as the Japanese occupation of World War II, all portraying the history of Panay and the evolution of the Ilonggo culture. According to Riitta Varitti of the Finnish-Philippine Society in Helsinki, "Jalandoni was the most productive Philippine writer of all time."

Other famous works include Anabella, Juanita Cruz, Sa Kapaang Sang Inaway (In the Heat of War), Ang Dalaga sa Tindahan (The Young Woman in the Market) and Ang Kahapon ng Panay (The Past of Panay). Throughout her turbulent and displaced life, she still managed to publish 36 novels, 122 short stories, 7 novelettes, 7 long plays, 24 short plays and dialogos in verse compiled in two volumes, seven volumes of personally compiled essays including some translations from Spanish and two autobiographies. She has been displaced from her hometown twice and has survived the Philippine Revolution, the Filipino-American War and the Japanese Occupation.

== Death and legacy ==
She died on September 14, 1978, at the age of 87 and is survived by a few nieces as well as several other close relatives. Despite all this, she still remains relatively unknown up to this day. Her family's ancestral house still stands as a historical landmark and museum not far from the cathedral of Jaro.

A street at the Cultural Center of the Philippines Complex in Pasay, Metro Manila is named in her honor.

== Awards and recognition ==
In 1977, she received the prestigious Republic Cultural Heritage Award for her literary achievements from the government.
