= Alicia P. Magos =

Filipino anthropologist

Alicia P. Magos is an anthropologist and a professor emerita of University of the Philippines Visayas. She had extensive and published works on the culture of Western Visayas especially on the Panay Bukidnon. She was a UNESCO International Literary Research Awardee and 1999 Metrobank Ten Outstanding Teacher.

== Education ==
She received her M.A in Anthropology from University of the Philippines Diliman in 1978 and later her Doctor of Philosophy in Philippine Studies in 1986 from the same university.

== Works on Sugidanon ==
Magos started her work on the Sugidanon (to tell), the epics of Panay in 1992 through a grant from the French government. She first recorded two epics from a shaman chanter named Anggoran (Christian name Preciosa “Susa” Caballero). In 1994, she further studied the extent of epic dissemination in Central Panay and discovered a total of 10 epics. The epics are the following: Tikun Kadlom, Amburukay, Derikaryong Pada, Balanakon, Kalampay, Pahagunong, Sinagnayan, Humadapnon sa Tarangban, Nagburuhisan, and Alayaw.

== Works on binukot ==
Magos first inquired into the phenomenon of the binukot from a socio-political perspective when she studied extensively the ma-aram (Babaylan) tradition in Antique.

== Published works ==
- Magos, Alicia P. (1994). "The Concept of Mari-it in Panaynon Maritime Worldview in Visayan Fisherfolks". VMAS, CSSP, UP Diliman. I.
- Magos, Alicia P. (1994). "Barko nga Bulawan: Tale of the Golden Boat in Panay Island". VMAS, CSSP, UP Diliman. II.
- Magos, Alicia P. (1995). "The Binokot (Kept-Maiden) in a Changing Socio-Cultural Perspective". Edukasyon. UP-ERP Journal, UP Diliman.
- Magos, Alicia P. (June 1996). "The Suguidanon of Central Panay, Danyag". Journal of the Social Sciences & Humanities, UPV.
- Magos, Alicia P. (1992). The Enduring Ma Aram Tradition: An Ethnography Of A Kinaray A Village In Antique. Quezon City: New Day Publishing House. ISBN 9711005069.
- Magos, Alicia P. (1995–1996). Ethnography of Calinaw, Iloilo (Tribal Community). Quezon City: UP/ERP-DECS/BNFE.
- Magos, Alicia P. (1995–1996). Ethnography of Magdalena, Iloilo (Hacienda Type Community). Quezon City: UP/ERP-DECS/BNFE. ISBN 971-622-005-7.
