= José de Luzuriaga =

Filipino judge, sugar planter, revolutionary and politician

The Honourable José Ruiz de Luzuriaga
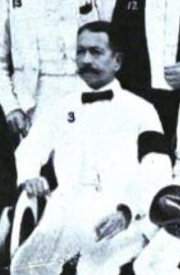
- Luzuriaga as Philippine Commissioner, by the Bureau of Insular Affairs, c. 1905

2nd Governor of Negros Occidental
- In office May 1, 1901 – August 15, 1901
- Preceded by: Melecio Severino
- Succeeded by: Leandro Locsin Rama

Personal details
- Born: José Ruiz de Luzuriaga y Guiquín; January 10, 1843 Bacolod, Negros, Captaincy General of the Philippines
- Died: July 5, 1921 (aged 78) Barcelona, Spain
- Spouse: Josefina Blanco

José Ruiz de Luzuriaga was a Filipino judge, sugar planter, revolutionary and politician. Luzuriaga was a member of the Philippine Commission from 1901 to 1913.

== Biography ==
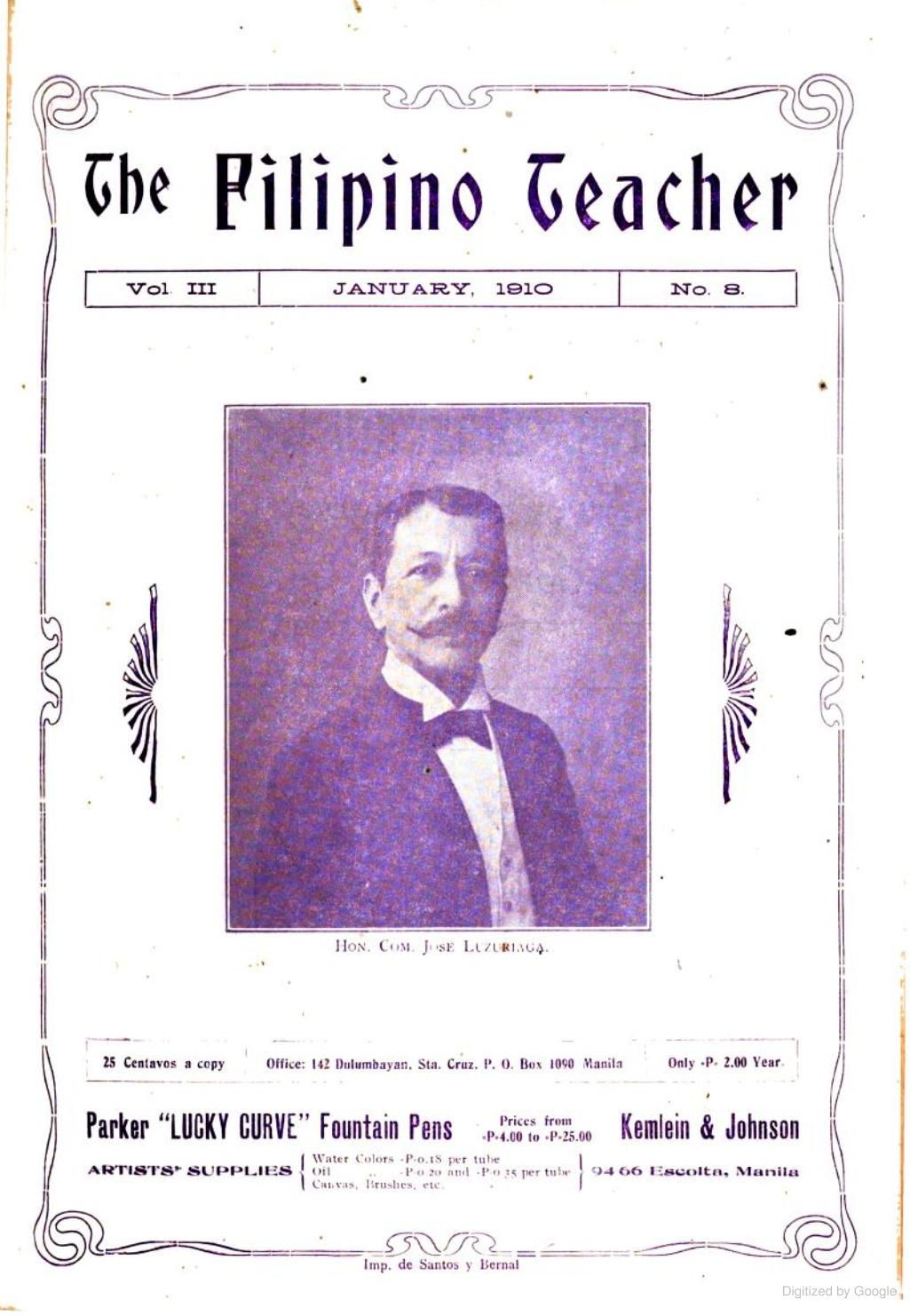
Luzuriaga depicted in a 1910 publication of The Filipino Teacher

José Ruiz de Luzuriaga was born on January 10, 1843, in Bacólod in the Filipino province of Negros Occidental. His father was a Spanish colonel in the Carlist army who emigrated to the Philippines after the end of the First Carlist War in 1840 and married José's mother, Juliana Guiquin. He received private education in Bacólod and then went to the Instituto de Reyes in Manila. After completing his education, he returned to Bacolod where he became a trader and manager of the sugar plantations of the Ruiz de Luzuriaga family.

Later he was justice of the peace and judge of the Court of First Instance (Primera Instancia). He was also a member of the provincial government and was appointed to the Visayas reform council in 1898 and became the president of the Chamber of deputies. Luzuriaga acted as an intermediary for the surrender of the Spaniards to the revolutionary forces in Bacólod on November 6, 1898. In addition, he was subsequently elected president of the temporary government of Negros.

Shortly thereafter on 18 February he was again responsible for a peaceful transfer of power, this time to the American troops. In 1900 Luzuriaga was appointed governor of the province of Negros Occidental. In 1901 he was one of the first members of the Philippine Commission. He was the only member who was a member during the entire period that this body existed (until 1913).

At the end of his life, he emigrated to Spain, where he settled in Barcelona. There Luzuriaga died in 1921 at the age of 78. He was married to Josefina Blanco with whom he had some children. Luzuriaga Street in Bacolod was named after him.

== Notable Descendants ==
- Peque Gallaga - multi award winning Film director and writer
- Katherine Luzuriaga - Physician, Immunologist, Included in the Time 100 list of the most influential people in the world for 2012, Vice Provost at the UMass Chan Medical School, consultant for the World Health Organization

== Notes ==
- Rosenstock's Press Reference Library, Philippine Edition, Manila, 1913
