= Negros Revolution =

1898 declaration of the Negros Republic during the Philippine Revolution

Negros Revolution of 1898
- Part of the Philippine Revolution
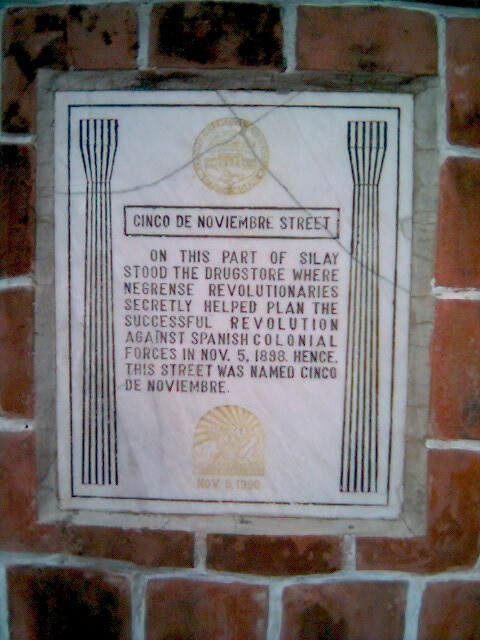
- Cinco de Noviembre Memorial Marker in Silay City, Negros Occidental, Philippines
Date	November 3, 1898 – November 24, 1898
Location	Negros Island, Philippines
Result	Decisive Filipino victory: Surrender of Spanish troops; establishment of Republic of Negros

Belligerents
Katipunan: Negrense Revolutionaries	(Spain) Spanish Empire: Guardia Civil

Commanders and leaders
Aniceto Lacson; Juan Araneta	(Spain) Isidro de Castro (surrendered) (Spain) Maximiano Correa

Casualties and losses
Unknown	Unknown

The Negros Revolution (Filipino: Himagsikang Negrense; Cebuano: Rebolusyong Negrense; Spanish: Revolución negrense), commemorated and popularly known as the Fifth of November (Spanish: Cinco de noviembre) or Negros Day (Hiligaynon: Adlaw sang Negros; Cebuano: Adlaw sa Negros; Spanish: Día de Negros) was a political movement in the Philippines that established a government on Negros Island in 1898, during the Spanish-American War, ending Spanish control of the island and paving the way for a republican government run by the Negrense natives. The newly established Negros Republic (Hiligaynon: Republika sg Negros; Cebuano: Republika sa Negros; Spanish: República de Negros) lasted for approximately three months. American forces landed unopposed on the island on February 2, 1899, ending the island's independence. Negros was then annexed to the Philippine Islands on 20 April 1901.

== Prelude to revolution ==
It has been stipulated that the Spanish civil and religious authorities in Negros did not initially suspect that the sugar barons and traders of the island would participate in an uprising against Spain. The clergy in Negros had not acquired vast tracts of land, unlike their contemporaries on the island of Luzon. Negros had become a rich province and the local leaders were said to be "content, sharing even in many instances the social privileges of the Spanish elite."

Negros did not seem enthusiastic about the August 23, 1896 "Cry of Balintawak" and the subsequent revolt headed by the Tagalog Katipuneros. Rather, it disapproved the same as battalions of volunteers were organized in Bais, Valladolid, La Carlota, and Isabela in order to defend the island. There were earlier attempts by various groups at the grassroots level to revolt against the Spanish colonizers, notably the dios-dios movements lead by Dios Buhawi and Papa Isio.

However, a greater part of the sugar planters soon began to sympathize towards the proposed ends of the insurrection, until two years later, such sympathy bore fruit when these same sugar planters broke out in open revolt. By that time, Aniceto Lacson, a rich landlord of Talisay City had joined the Katipunan, and Juan Araneta, Rafael Ramos, Carlos Gemora, Venura, and other leaders of what would become the revolution of 1898 were negotiating with their comrades in Iloilo and were arming themselves.

By the middle of August 1898, as numerous rumors of a coming insurrection in the Visayas spread, a number of parish priests sought refuge in Iloilo, and then Jaro.

== Chronicle of the revolt ==
Negrense revolutionaries in Iloilo agreed that the revolt would begin on November 3, 1898. It was to be led by Aniceto Lacson with Nicolás Gólez of Silay as deputy commander. South of Bacolod, the revolt was to be led by Juan Araneta of Bago with Rafael Ramos of Himamaylan as deputy commander.

Official flag of the Negros Revolution until 1898. The flag would be changed when the Negros Republic was established (1898-1901)

=== November 3 ===
Map showing the southward advance of Negrense forces on Negros Island. Revolutionaries are shown in red, Spaniards in dark yellow.

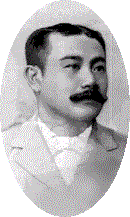
Aniceto Lacson

Aniceto Lacson rode to Silay. A committee headed by Lacson and acting for the province included Gólez, Leandro Locsin and Melecio Severino assembled and decided to begin the province-wide revolt on November 5. They then advised Juan Araneta of their decision to begin their revolution on the said day, and his approval was granted.

=== November 4 ===
Juan Araneta, from one of his haciendas in Ma-ao, advised all the southern mayors to begin the revolt the following day. In the afternoon, a woman from Kabankalan Norte (present-day barangay Eustaquio López), Silay told priest Tomás Cornago of the impending revolt, even though the planning for the same was held secretly. He inquired of his friend, Doroteo Quillama, cabeza of the barrio, seeking to verify the report. The cabeza claimed no knowledge of the revolt. That same afternoon, groups of armed men passed through the haciendas of Silay, and proceeded towards the town. The guardia civil in Silay were, however, unable to report this to Bacolod; the rebels had cut the telegraph lines in Talisay the day before.

=== November 5 ===
The revolt began in central and northern Negros in the morning and by the afternoon had spread to other towns such as San Miguel and Cadiz. In Silay, Lt. Maximiano Correa, commanding the Spanish garrison, had ten Spanish cazadores (light infantry) and seven Filipino gaurdia civil. They were entrenched inside the municipal building, but surrendered without a fight when they realized that the townspeople were determined to burn the building to the ground should there be resistance. The Silay parish priest, Eulogio Sáez, a businessman named Juan Viaplana, and José Ledesma persuaded the Spanish forces to lay down their arms, but in order to save face, the lieutenant had it appear in the official records that the capitulation was the result of a bloody battle with "dead and wounded littered all over the field of battle". Ten Mauser and seven Remington rifles were surrendered by the garrison. Later, a flag similar to the design of the Filipino flag embroidered by Olympia Severino, Perpetua Severino, and Eutropia Yorac was hoisted by the victorious townspeople.

In Bacolod, the governor of the province, Isidro de Castro, sent a force of 25 cazadores and 16 civil guards to engage a swarm of rebels seen camping near the Matab-ang River. After a brief skirmish, they withdrew, leaving two of their number dead. The governor decided to make a stand in the Bacolod Convent (presently the Bishop's Palace, the rectory of the San Sebastian Cathedral), where hundreds of Spanish families had taken refuge. They waited for the attack, but it did not come.

=== 6 November ===
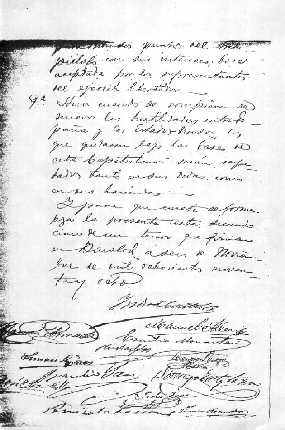
The last page of the Acta de Capitulación (Surrender Document).

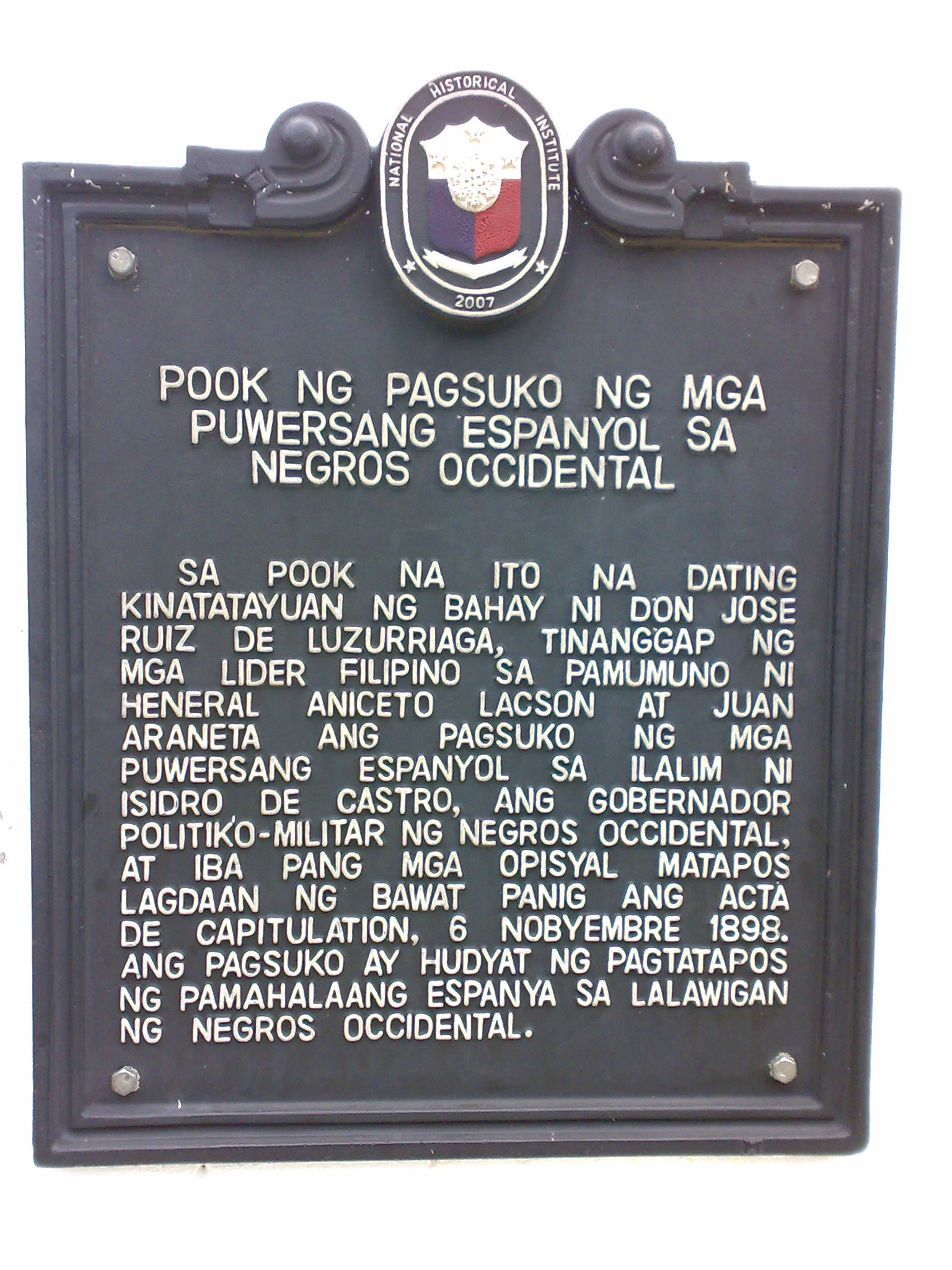
Historical marker commemorating the surrender of Spanish forces in Bacolod in 1898. Installed at the Fountain of Justice in 2007.

In the morning, the rebels advanced upon Bacolod. Lacson and Gólez approached from the north, crossing the Mandalagan River. Araneta with a thousand bolo-men took positions at the Lupit River in the south-east of Bacolod. The wily revolutionaries augmented their lightly armed forces with "cannon" made of bamboo and rolled amakan, and "rifles" carved out of wood and coconut fronds. The bluff worked; de Castro was persuaded that it was useless to defend the capital.

José Ruiz de Luzuriaga, a rich businessman who was deemed acceptable to both rebels and Spanish authorities was sent to mediate. At noon, a delegation from each of the major belligerents met at the house of Luzuriaga. The rebel delegation included Lacson, Araneta, Gólez, Locsín, Simeón Lizares, Julio Díaz, and José Montilla. In an hour, it was agreed by both sides that "Spanish troops both European and native surrendered the town and its defenses unconditionally, turning over arms and communication" and that "public funds would be turned over to the new government".

November 6, 1898, therefore, is the day that the revolution in Negros concluded.

The Spanish signatories of the surrender document included Isidro de Castro, Braulio Sanz, Manuel Abenza, Ramón Armada, Emilio Monasterio and Domingo Ureta. Those who signed for the Negros revolutionary forces were Aniceto Lacson, Juan Araneta, Leandro Locsin, Simeón Lizares, Julio Díaz, and José Montilla.

Forty-seven eminent Negrenses formulated and ratified a constitution to create a new republic. Signatories included among others Aniceto Lacson, Juan Araneta, Simeón Lizares, Antonio L. Jayme, Eusebio Luzuriaga, Nicolas Gólez, Agustín Amenabar, Rafael Ramos and Rosendo Lacson.

=== 17–24 November ===
On November 17, Governor Antionio Ferrer requisitioned the SS Bais, a ship which was sent by the Recollect Prior of Cebu to evacuate all the priests and put that vessel at the service of all Spaniards who wanted to leave the province. On the same day, from Hacienda Vallehermoso, Negrense forces under the command of Gen. de la Vina began a week-long march to Dumaguete.

As Gen. de la Vina and his forces neared Sibulan in the late afternoon of November 23, his compadre, Lieutenant Cornelio Yapsutco came to break the news that the Spaniards left Dumaguete.

On November 24, Dumaguete was captured by Negrense forces with the support of the local population, thereby liberating Negros Oriental, and consequently all of Negros, from Spanish rule.

== Impact ==
The revolution not only resulted in the establishment of the Republic of Negros, but also laid a firm foundation for both the Negros Island Region, albeit excluding Siquijor, which once formed part of Negros Oriental, and a future federal region.

== Commemoration ==
- The Cinco de Noviembre memorial in Silay City includes an authentic Spanish colonial-era cannon donated by Claudio G. Akol Jr.
- November 5 was declared by President Corazon Aquino as a special non-working holiday in the province through Republic Act No. 6709 signed on February 10, 1989.

== See also ==
- Aniceto Lacson
- Juan Araneta
- Republic of Negros
- Fountain of Justice
- Antonio Ledesma Jayme
- Philippine Revolution
