= Juan Araneta =

Filipino sugar farmer and revolutionary leader

Juan Anacleto Araneta
- Born: 13 July 1852; Molo, Iloilo, Captaincy General of the Philippines, Spanish Empire
- Died: 3 October 1924 (aged 72); Negros Occidental, Insular Government of the Philippine Islands
- Other names: Juan Araneta "Don Juan"
- Organization: Negros independence movement

Juan Anacleto Araneta y Torres (13 July 1852 – 3 October 1924) was a Filipino sugar farmer and revolutionary leader during the Negros Revolution.

== Early life ==
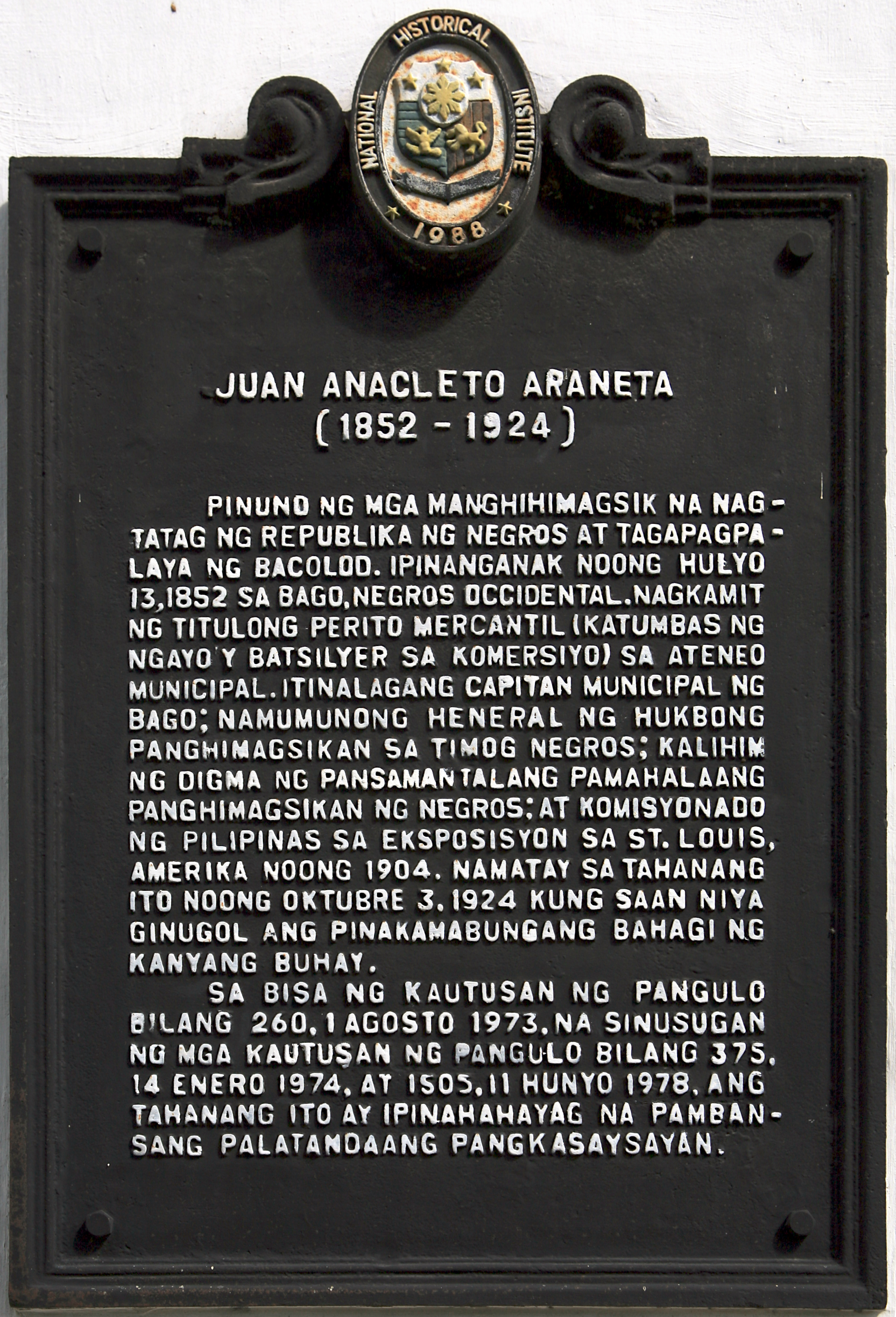
National historical marker unveiled in Bago City in 1988

Juan was born to Romualdo Araneta y Cabungsol, a direct male-line descendant of José de Araneta y Guyol, and Águeda Torres y Villanueva in Molo, Iloilo, Philippines. The Araneta-Torres family later moved to Negros and settled there permanently.`

At the age of 19, he was brought by his brother-in-law, Pedro Sarmiento, to Manila and was enrolled at the Ateneo Municipal de Manila. He showed great promise in school, earning medals of merit for his endeavours. He graduated with a perito mercantil degree, equivalent to today's bachelor's degree in Commerce. His contemporaries in school included José Rizal, Jose Alejandrino, Cayetano Arellano, and Apolinario Mabini, among others.

Upon returning to Molo, he was elected Capitan del Pueblo, like his father before him. The friars in the province, however, had become suspicious of him, and only the high regard and respect of the people of Bago and the other towns in the province of Negros Occidental prevented his summary liquidation by the Spanish authorities.

In 1891, Juan went to Europe with his friend, Don Claudio Reina after his wife died. He had the opportunity to meet many of the Filipino leaders then living in Madrid, London and Paris. As a consequence, the Spanish authorities were even more antagonistic toward him upon his return. As a result, he lost the land that he and his sisters inherited from their parents. He had to take his family to the slopes of Mount Kanlaon where they started to farm anew. He brought many gadgets to his hacienda in Dinapalan. One popular tale was his use of a telescope to supervise his laborers in the vast hacienda from afar. It became a legend among the common people that he had magical powers, but in reality, he was only able to see their actions by using the telescope.

== Altercation with Spanish authorities ==
His travels in Europe made him aware of the use of new machinery and tools for agriculture. He imported a sugar mill from England and had it installed in his hacienda in Dinapalan. From time to time, he bought farm implements like a baler for abaca, a rice thresher, and plows of improved models.

This preference for modern agricultural tools, however, became his undoing. The Spanish authorities grew suspicious of the boatloads of cargo being unloaded near his land in Lumangub. He was arrested and brought to Concordia in January 1897. He was later brought to Himamaylan and then again to Ilog which was then the capital of the province. His diary hinted that even in prison, there were plans to organize the revolutionary forces in the province. There were annotations showing that he made contact with other leaders in the province. He was finally brought to Bacolod where he was released in October 1897.

== The Negros Revolution ==
On November 5, 1898, (Cinco de Noviembre) a messenger from Talisay brought news that the revolutionaries and the cazadores were already engaged in skirmishes. At about 1:00 in the afternoon, the revolutionary forces in Bago started marching toward Bacolod. They had only three firearms among them: a Remington rifle, a Mauser rifle, and a shotgun. General Araneta, who led the rebel forces, told his men to cut nipa stems or pagong, and to shoulder these as if these were rifles. In case they contact with each other, the password was to be utod (brother) in Hiligaynon.

The Spanish authorities in Bacolod, who saw the rebels marching toward the town, thought that they wanted to surrender their arms. Surprised, the Spaniards were advised by the rebels to surrender in order to avert bloodshed. The Spaniards readily agreed. It was only when Bacolod was already in the hands of the rebels, that the Spanish reinforcements from Iloilo arrived.

The Spanish Governor of Negros Island, Don Isidro Castro, surrendered to forces under Aniceto Lacson and Juan Araneta at Bacolod on 6 Nov. 1898.

== The Republic of Negros ==
A cantonal form of government was set up in Bacolod with General Aniceto Lacson as President and General Juan Araneta serving as Secretary of War. When the Americans arrived in Iloilo, he counseled the cantonal government to submit to the American forces. This was vehemently opposed and ridiculed by his companions-in-arms. His idea was finally adopted, however, and the Americans occupied Negros without encountering hostilities.

== Family ==
Juan Araneta sired a total of 25 children, as he was married twice and had relationships with two more women:

- Celestina Díaz, with whom he had a son:

1. Emilio Araneta y Díaz

- Cristeta Sarmiento, with whom he had nine children:

1. Elisa Araneta y Sarmiento
2. Romualdo Araneta y Sarmiento
3. Félix Araneta y Sarmiento
4. Gertrudes Araneta y Sarmiento
5. Jaime Carlos Araneta y Sarmiento
6. Jorge León Araneta y Sarmiento
7. José Araneta y Sarmiento
8. Luisa Flavia Araneta y Sarmiento
9. Ramón Araneta y Sarmiento

- Natalia Salsalida, with whom he had thirteen children:

1. Agüeda María Feliciana Araneta y Salsalida
2. Romualdo Marcial Araneta y Salsalida
3. Crestita Pascuala Araneta y Salsalida
4. Teresa Bonifacia Araneta y Salsalida
5. Guillermo Hillarión Araneta y Salsalida
6. Ana Justina Araneta y Salsalida
7. María Ricarda 'Rica' Araneta y Salsalida
8. Patrocinio Dominga Araneta y Salsalida
9. Teodoro Antonio Araneta y Salsalida
10. Silvia Agustina Araneta y Salsalida
11. Woodrow Cecilio Araneta y Salsalida
12. Felipe Alberto Araneta y Salsalida
13. Félix Alberto Araneta y Salsalida

- Juanita Camellarosa, with whom he two daughters:

1. Trinidad Araneta y Camellarosa
2. Rufina Araneta y Camellarosa

== Later life ==
In 1904, he was appointed as one of the commissioners to the St. Louis Exposition where he put on exhibit over a thousand varieties of rice, samples of cacao, beans, abaca, and many other agricultural crops from Negros and Panay. All these exhibits were of exceptional merit; as a result, he was awarded with gold and silver medallions. He also developed Buenos Aires Mountain Resort for his large family to use and enjoy. He later gave this property to his daughter Maria A. Matti.

He kept in touch with new developments in agriculture, either in tools and implements or crops. He tried to grow different crops on his farm and even planted trees that were not endemic to Negros. When the Ma-ao Sugar Central was organized, he became one of its founders. He lent to the corporation the titles of his land to back up the new enterprise. He prevailed upon his lessees to plant wide areas of land to sugar cane.

Araneta died on October 3, 1924, leaving behind a large family of about 25 members.

== See also ==
- Negros
- Negros Revolution
- Silay City
- Talisay City
- Bacolod
