= Mount Santa Rita Naval Link Station =

US Navy facility in Bataan, Philippines

Coordinates: 14°49′19″N 120°21′49″E

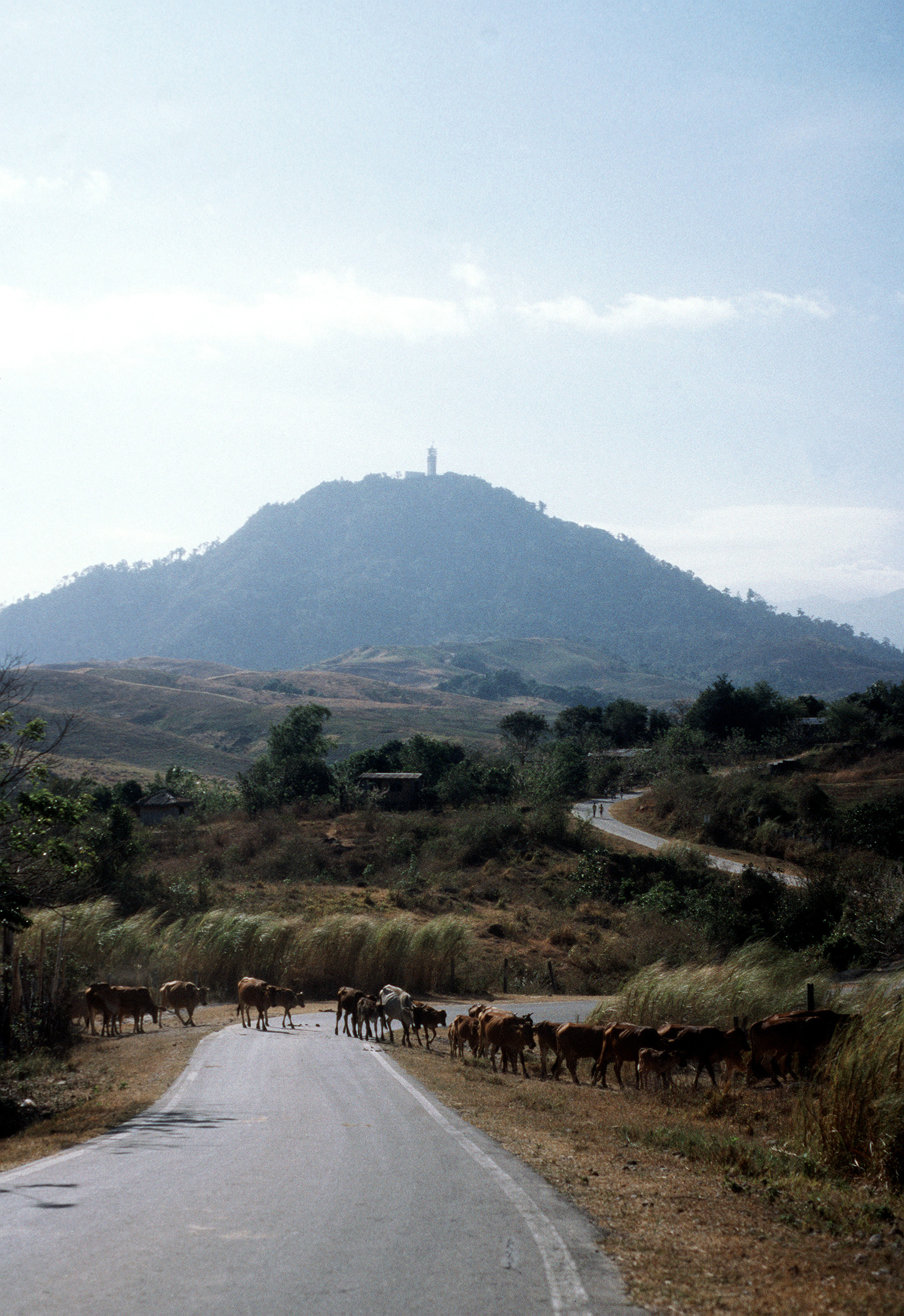
Mount Santa Rita Naval Link Station in 1981

Mount Santa Rita was a facility of the United States Navy in Bataan, Philippines. It was the U.S. Naval Link Station (USNAVLINKSTA) within the Philippines. There were approximately 15 people that were permanently attached to this station at any given time, while there were also seven Marine guards who rotated every seven days. These Marine Guards were members of Alpha Company Marine Barracks, Subic Bay. Other than military personnel, there were Philippine nationals that worked there as well.

== Facilities ==
The tower had 5 microwave links which transmitted to Subic Bay Naval Base, Clark Air Base, Naval Air Station Cubi Point, San Miguel Naval Communications Station (NAVCOMSTAPHIL), Sangley Point Naval Base and the United States Embassy in Manila.

== History ==
During the Vietnam War, all communications from Vietnam went through Santa Rita. The link started in Nha Trang, then came to the Philippines via underwater cable to NAVCOMSTAPHIL, through Mt. Santa Rita to Clark AB and then to the HF transmitter site at the Naval Communication Transmitting Facility, Capas in Tarlac, which transmitted to the US Mainland.

== See also ==
- U.S. Naval Radio Facility Bagobantay
