= Armed Forces of the Philippines Officer Candidate School =

Coordinates: 15°22′0″N 120°30′30″E

- Paaralang Kandidato Opisyal ng Sandatahang Lakas ng Pilipinas; Escuelas de Oficiales Asimilados de las Fuerzas Armadas de Filipinas
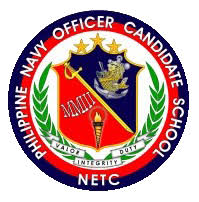
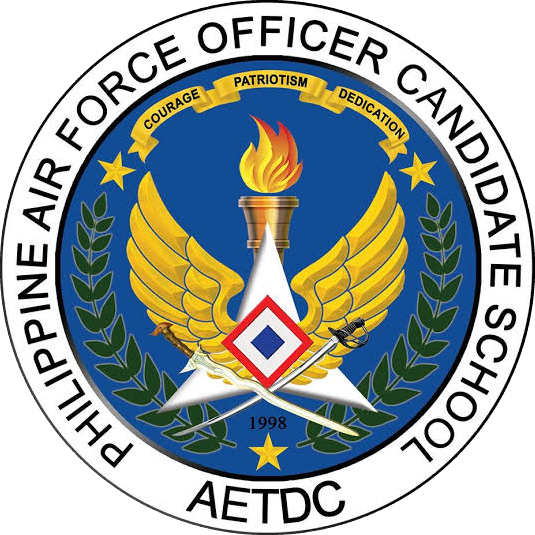
- Active: 1937–1959 (SRC); 1975–present (OCS)
- Country: Philippines
- Branch: Philippine Army, Air Force, and Navy
- Type: Military school
- Role: Training
- Part of: TRACOM AETDC NETC
- Garrison/HQ: Camp O'Donnell, Tarlac; Fernando Air Base, Batangas; Naval Station Leovigildo Gantioqui, Zambales
- Nicknames: AFP OCS Professionals - "OCian", "Bok", "Probi"
- Mottos: Valor, Integrity, Duty
- Colors: Metallic Gold
- March: AFP OCS Hymn - "Hail to Thee, OCS!"
- Website: www.tradoc.mil.ph www.pnocs.net

Commanders
- Commandants: Col. Harold M. Cabunoc, PA (PAOCS) Col. Joseph B. Madarang, PAF (PAFOCS) LCdr. Bryner R. Las, PN (PNOCS)

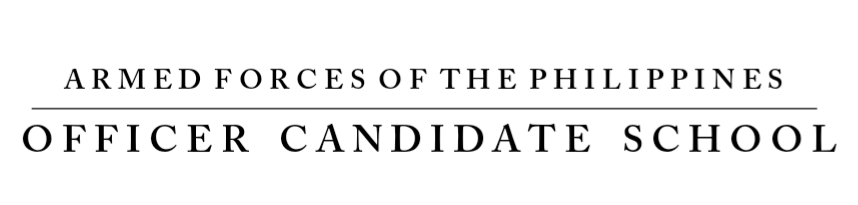

The Armed Forces of the Philippines Officer Candidate School (OCS; Filipino: Paaralang Kandidato Opisyal ng Sandatahang Lakas ng Pilipinas), formerly known as the School for Reserve Commission, is a military school located at Camp O'Donnell, Capas, Tarlac for the Philippine Army Officer Candidate School; Fernando Air Base in Lipa City, Batangas for the Philippine Air Force Officer Candidate School; and Naval Station Leovigildo Gantioqui in San Antonio, Zambales for the Philippine Navy Officer Candidate School. It was established in the Philippines for training future officers of the Armed Forces of the Philippines (AFP).

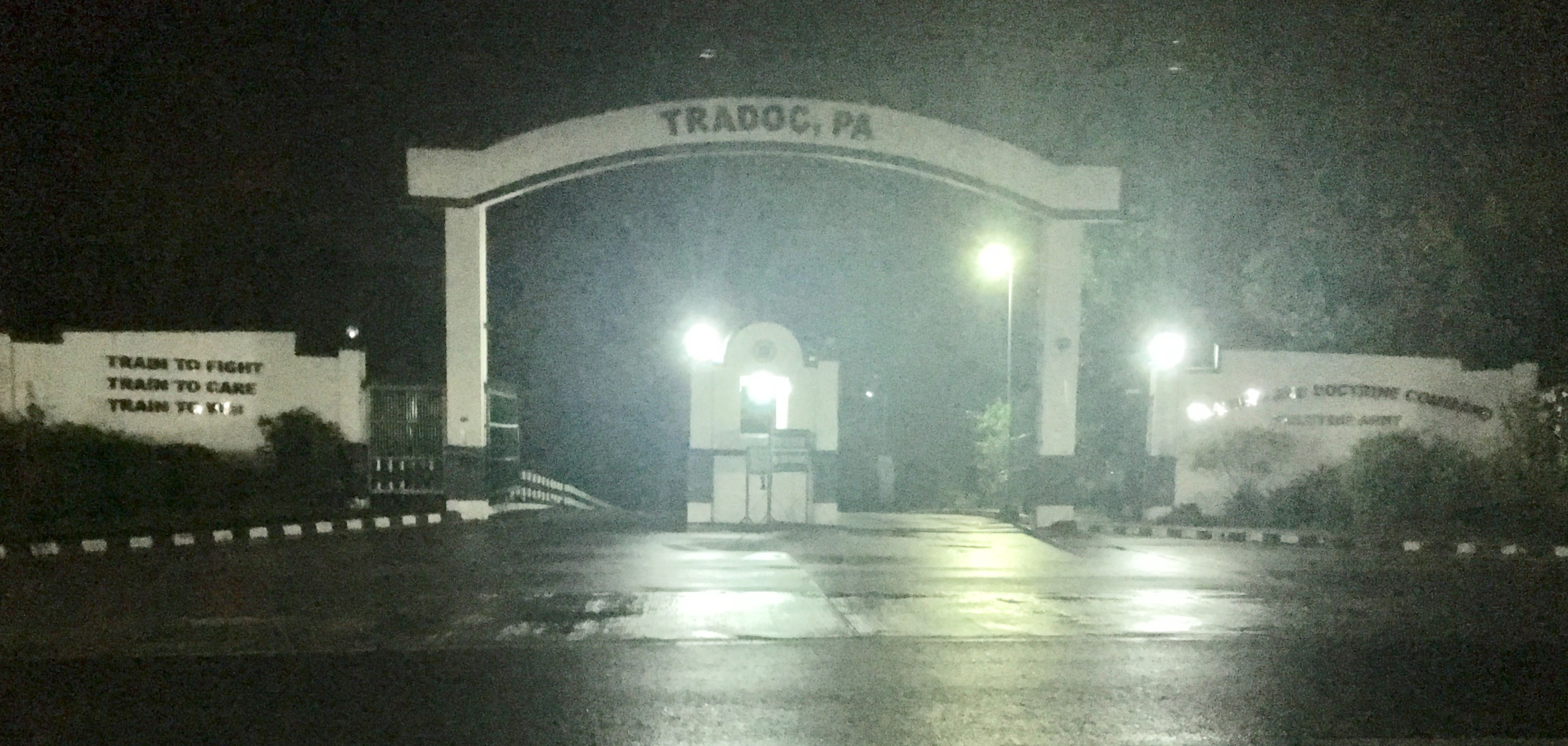
Training Command (TRACOM), Philippine Army located at Brgy. Sta. Lucia, Capas, Tarlac

The School trains civilians and enlisted personnel holding a baccalaureate degree for the officer candidate course (OCC); one-year leadership and management graduate course which prepares an officer candidate (OC) with a rank of Probationary Second Lieutenant and Probationary Ensign to be mentally, physically and emotionally fit to earn a commission as an officer in the Philippine Army, the Philippine Air Force, and the Philippine Navy. Graduates of this school are commissioned as second lieutenants and ensigns in the AFP Regular and Reserve Forces by the president of the Republic of the Philippines, who also serves as the commander-in-chief of the AFP.

Since its creation, more than 3,000 officers have graduated from the Officer Candidate School. The school's motto Valor, Integrity, and Duty still remains strong and relevant despite changes in the society and government.

== History ==
The story of the Officer Candidate School began during the formation of the School for Reserve Commission in 1937. Three Schools were set up, two for the Infantry in Tarlac and Lanao, and one for the Field Artillery in Mabalacat, Pampanga. These schools were active until the Second World War reached the shores of the Philippines in 1941.

After the war, the school was reactivated and transferred to Fort McKinley under the Philippine Army School Center, Philippine Army Training Command. For the Philippine Air Force, they produced three classes of officer candidates at Nichols Air Base before the PA SRC was reestablished. Three classes were held during April 1951 to May 1953. Graduates of the said program subsequently earned their commissions in the AFP Reserve Force. Following this, the Ground Combat School, PASC took over the training in Fort McKinley. SRC Classes 7 to 25 were trained during the period of September 1954 to April 1959 until it was stopped. The school was then transferred to Fort Magsaysay in Nueva Ecija, and the SRC was directed by higher headquarters to conduct instead a Non-commissioned Officer Course. NCOC courses 1 to 3 were completed from April 1959 to January 1960.

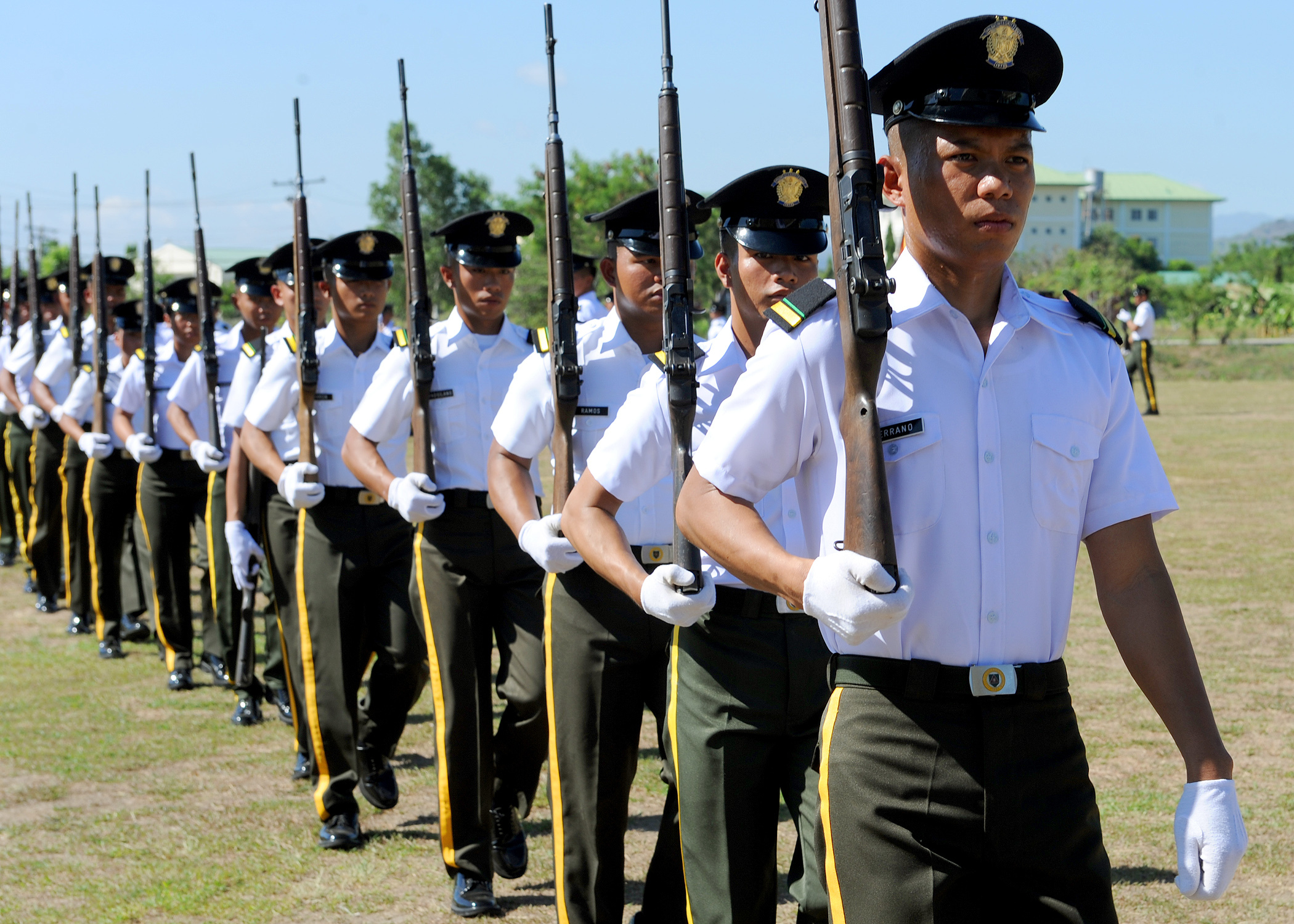
Philippine Army officer candidates march on the parade grounds during Balikatan 2013 at Camp O'Donnell, Tarlac.

The SRC resumed its training courses when it was transferred to Camp Tinio in Bangad, Cabanatuan in 1975. After its first class (CL 1-75), the name SRC was changed to the AFP Officer Candidate School (AFPOCS) while still continuing the SRC program of instruction. Before being deactivated once again in 1979, the AFPOCS completed seven classes while one SRC class in 1975 was conducted exclusively for the Philippine Air Force. The next reincarnation of AFPOCS was at Camp Capinpin, Tanay, Rizal in 1987. Seventeen classes, including the four pioneer members of the Women's Auxiliary Corps (WAC) of OCS Cl 02-88 were produced by the AFPOCS.

Upon the deactivation of the AFP Training Command, the OCS transferred to the control of TRADOC, PA. In October 1996, 105 former members of the Moro National Liberation Front (MNLF) graduated as officers of the Philippine Army pursuant to the 1996 peace agreement between the MNLF and the Government.

Some noteworthy members who made star ranks include Brigadier Generals Leandro Lonzame and Ruso Sabalones of the pre-WW2 SRC. Brigadier Generals Alexander Felix, Armando Mateo, and Rogelio Martin were products of SRC classes in Fort McKinley. Notable SRC Bangad graduates include J/Director Arturo W Alit. OCS class 02-88 pride themselves with including in their ranks Maj Dahlia Nograles PN and Maj Ester Bautista PN, the 1st skipper and executive officer of the 1st all-female crewed PN vessel. Some notable adopted members include, among others, LtGen. Alberto Braganza, Gen. Azumi of the Royal Malaysian Army, Col. Chris Brins of the Australian Army, MGen. Edwin Vargas, and Lieutenant Generals Roy Kyamko and Alfonzo Dagudag.

== Training sites ==
- Camp O'Donnell, Capas, Tarlac: Officer Candidate Course and Officer Preparatory Course, Officer Candidate School, Training Command, PA
- Fernando Air Base, Lipa City, Batangas: Philippine Air Force Officer Candidate Course, Philippine Air Force Officer Candidate School, Air Education, Training, and Doctrine Command, PAF
- Naval Station Leovigildo Gantioqui, San Antonio, Zambales: Naval Officer Candidate Course, Philippine Navy Officer Candidate School, Naval Education and Training Command, PN

== See also ==
Cadet rank in the Philippines
