= Capas National Shrine =

WWII memorial in Tarlac, Philippines

- Philippines
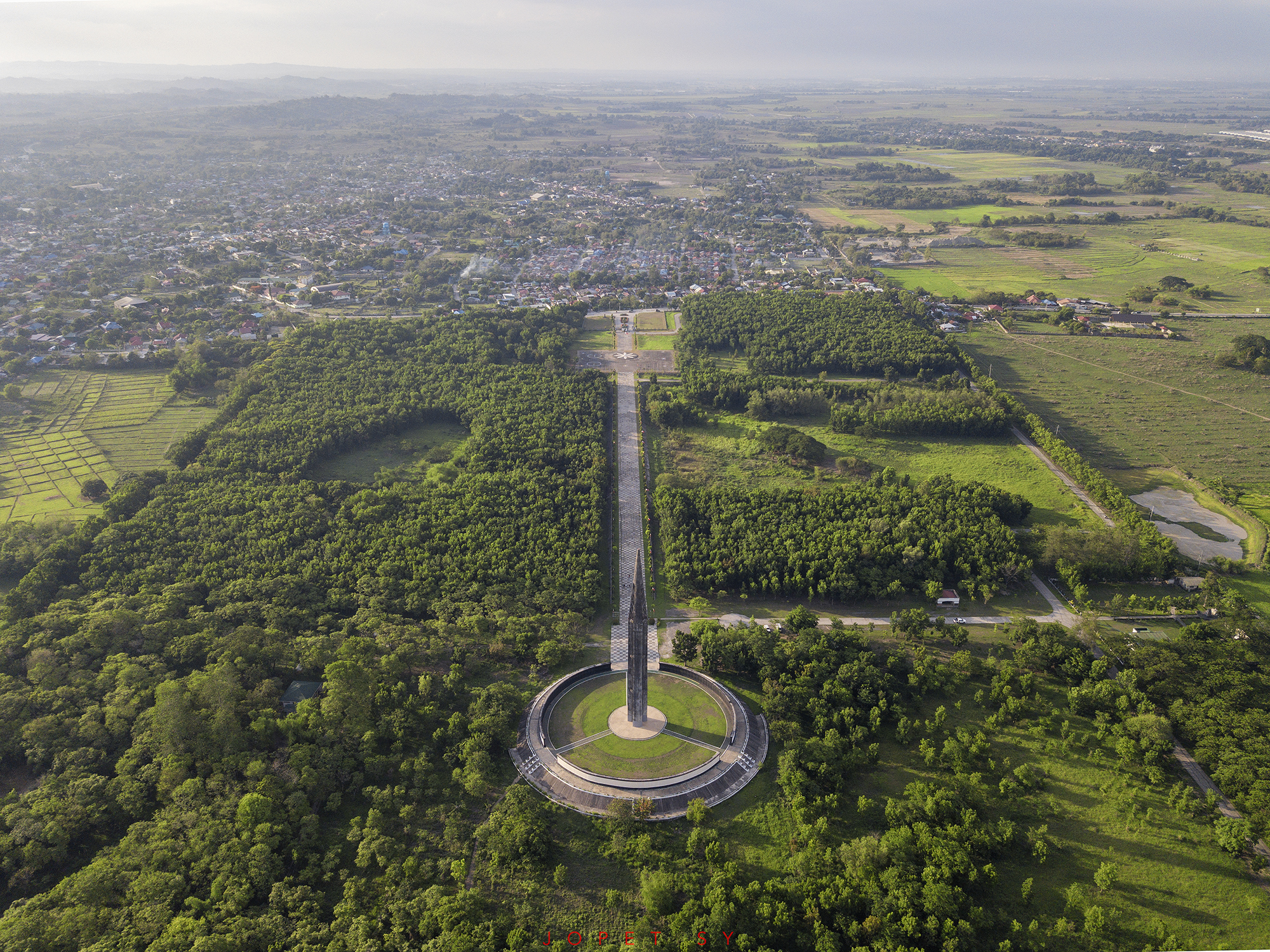
- For Filipino and American soldiers who were interned at Camp O'Donnell at the end of the Bataan Death March
- Established: 7 December 1991
- Unveiled: 9 April 2003
- Location: 15°20′56″N 120°32′43″E; Capas, Tarlac, Philippines
- Total burials: 30,000+ (around 25,000 Filipinos and 6,000 Americans)
- "This memorial is dedicated to the brave men and women who defied the might of the invaders at Bataan, Corregidor and other parts of the Philippines during World War II. Thousands died in battle, during the Death March, and while in captivity. Thousands more endured inhuman conditions at the prison camp in Capas, Tarlac. They suffered in the night so that their countrymen would wake to the dawn of freedom."

The Capas National Shrine (Filipino: Pambansang Dambana ng Capas) in Barangay Aranguren, Capas, Tarlac, Philippines was built by the Philippine government as a memorial to Allied soldiers who were interned at Camp O'Donnell at the end of the Bataan Death March during the Second World War.

The site, which was the former concentration camp for the Allied prisoners, is a focus for commemorations on Araw ng Kagitingan (Valour Day), an annual observance held on 9 April—the anniversary of the surrender of US and Philippine forces to Imperial Japan in 1942. There is also a memorial inside the site to the Czechs who died fighting alongside the Filipino and US soldiers.

== Description ==
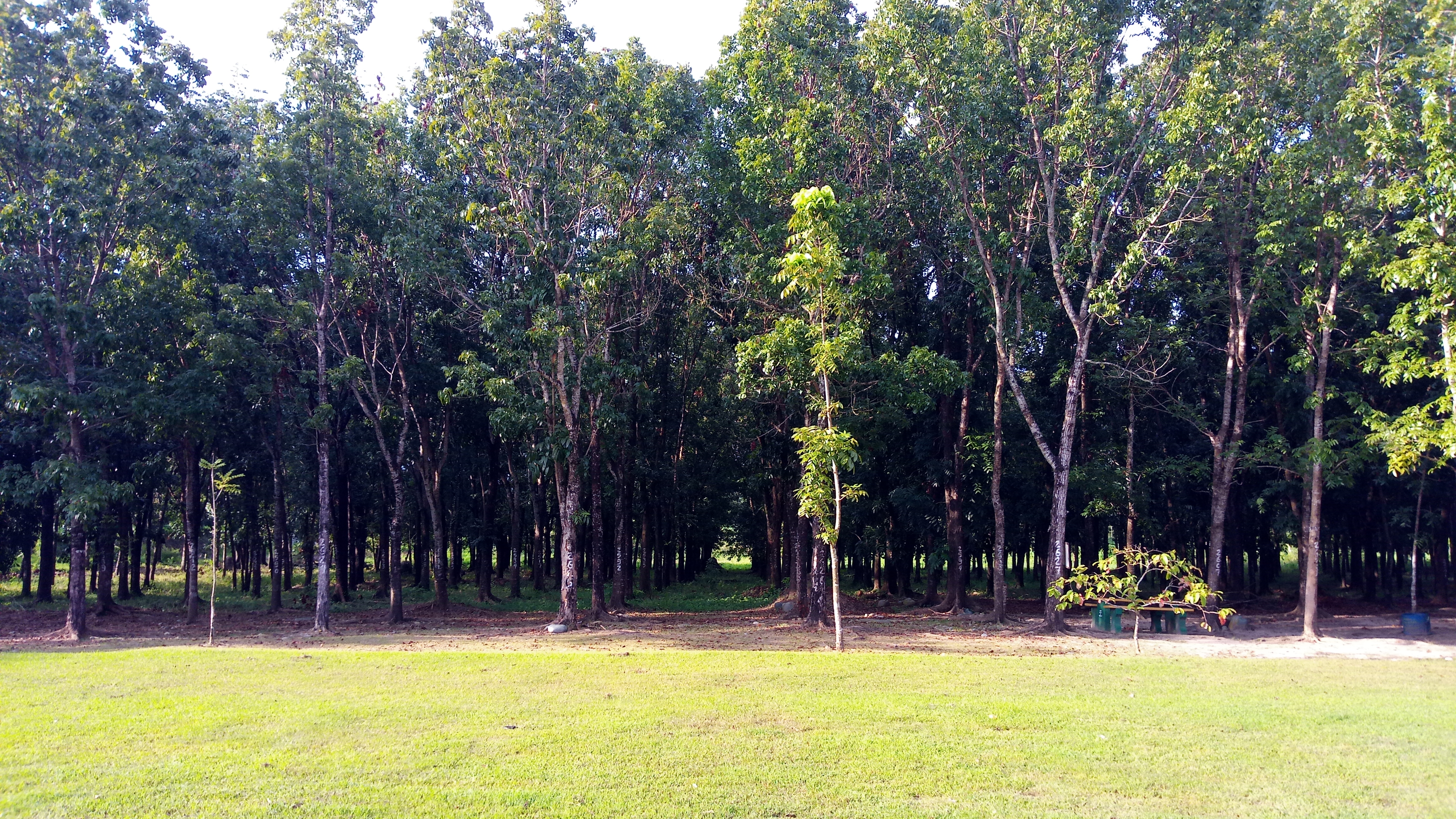
Trees at the shrine planted in honor of those who died during the Death March, each of which was assigned a number corresponding to a soldier's number

The area where the Bataan Death March ended was proclaimed as "Capas National Shrine" by President Corazon Aquino on 7 December 1991. The shrine encompasses 54 hectares (130 acres) of parkland, 35 hectares (86 acres) of which have been planted with trees each representing the dead, at the location of the former concentration camp. Prior to the construction, the location was under the control of the United States Navy as U.S. Naval Radio Station, Tarlac until 1989.

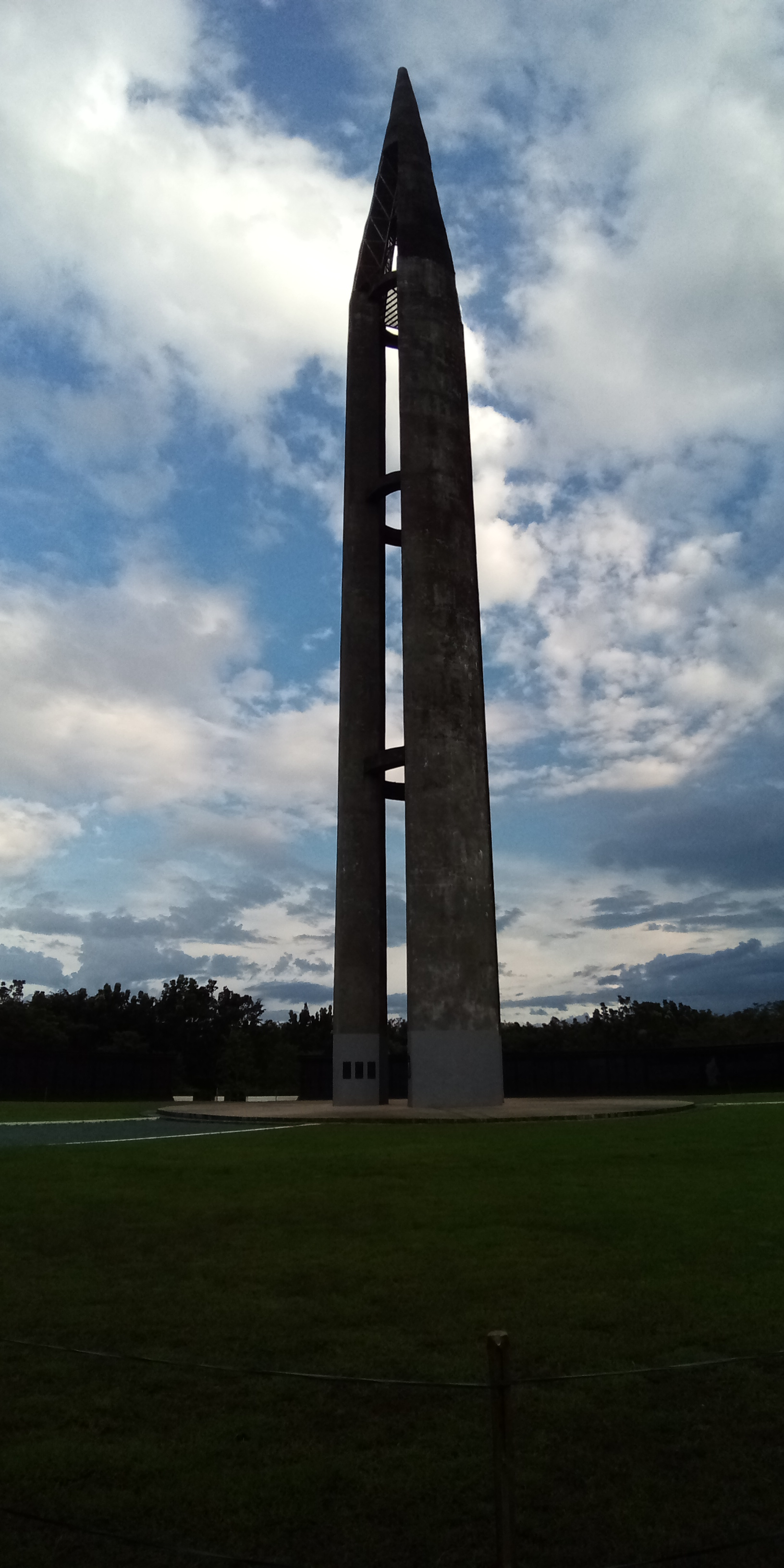
The 73-metre (240 ft)-tall obelisk at the shrine

On 9 April 2003, a 73-metre (240 ft) obelisk symbolizing peace surrounded by a new memorial wall were unveiled on a part of the grounds of the former internment camp. The obelisk is surrounded by a three-segmented, black marble wall engraved with the names of more than 30,000 Filipinos who were incarcerated in the camp. There are also statistics about the total number of prisoners and dead, accompanied by poems for peace.

Nearby, on the western side of the shrine, there are three smaller memorials to the countries whose nationals died at the camp: the Philippines, the United States, and the Czech Republic (then Czechoslovakia). A small museum and monument is also on the site, built by an American group called the "Battling Bastards of Bataan". Included here is a roster of Filipino officers who were appointed by the Camp Commandant to manage the POWs. It also memorializes the daily sufferings of the POWs under the hands of the Imperial Japanese Army camp wards. Records have indicated that around 400 Filipino POWs died daily until August 1942.

A few hundred meters from the Obelisk is a garden separated from the rest of the shrine by a creek that can be crossed via a hanging bridge. The relics of an old livestock wagon or boxcar of the Philippine National Railway and railings are also found in the shrine complex. This display would be similar to the SNCF wagon displayed at the Auschwitz concentration camp, giving visitors an idea of the difficulties faced by the POWs who were herded in 80 persons per wagon volume, during hot summer conditions, without food, water, or facilities for sanitation.

According to the Philippine government's master plan, the Shrine will be a part of the New Clark City.

== Gallery ==
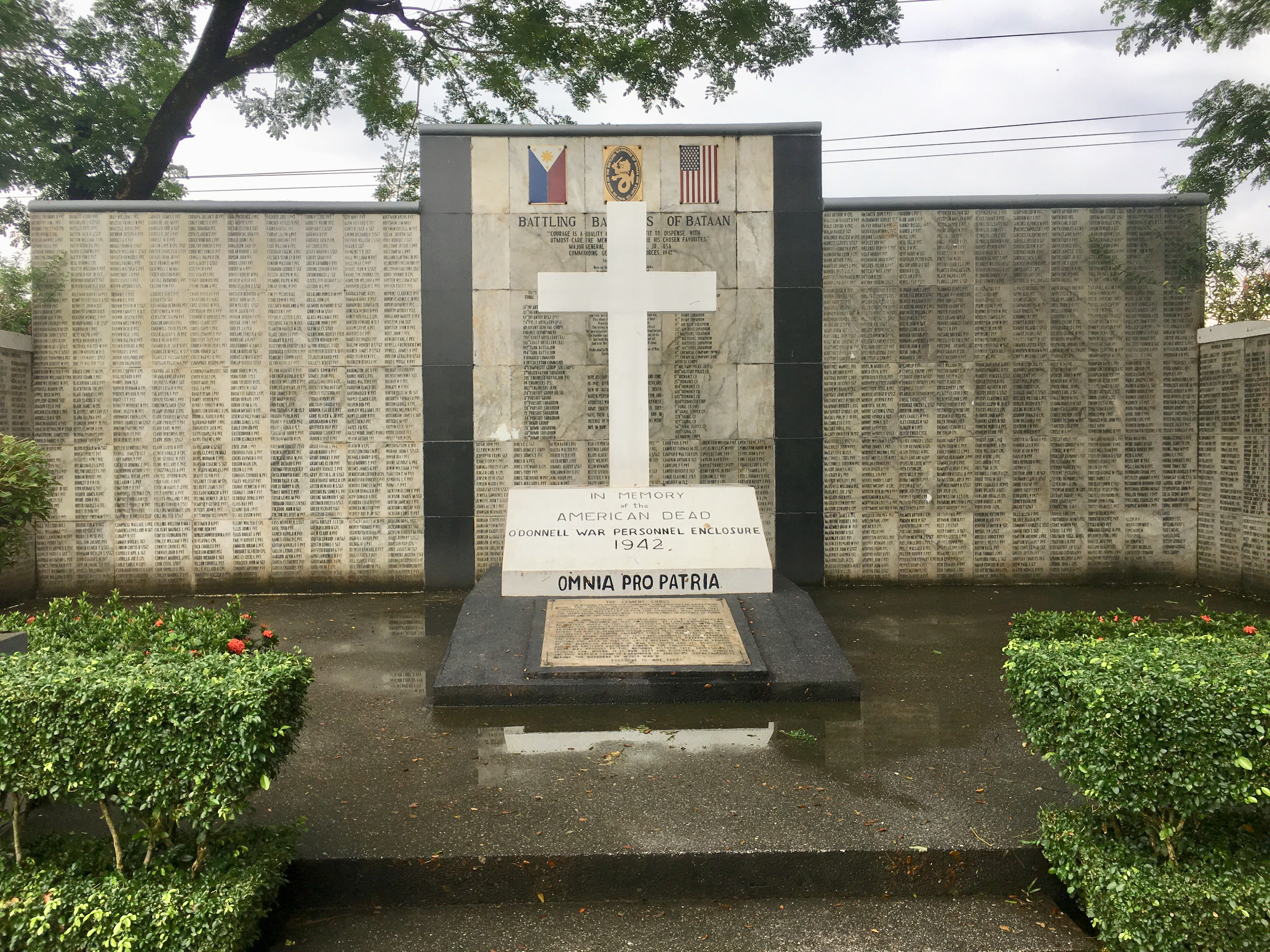
The Omnia Pro Patria monument at the shrine.

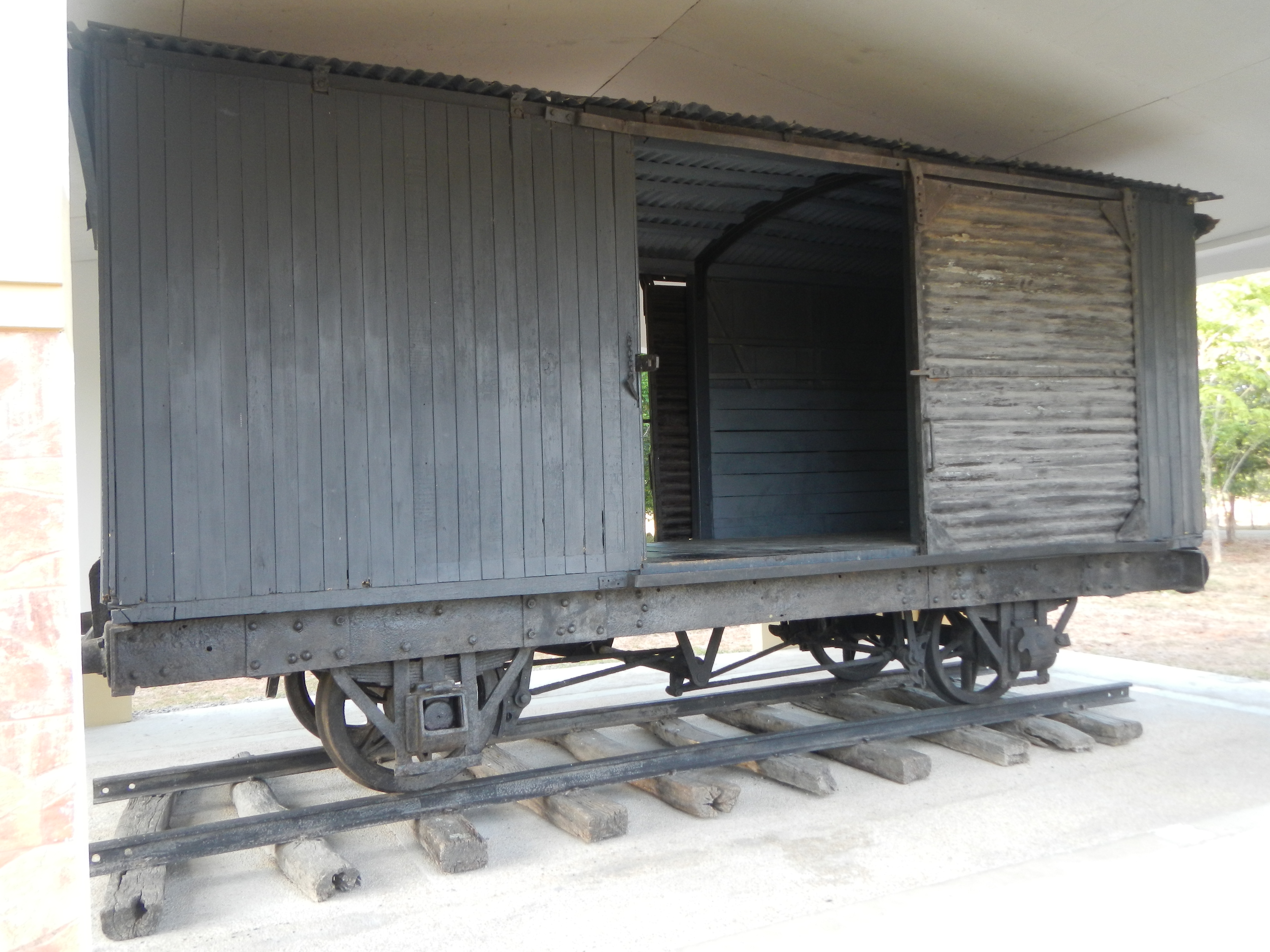
The relic of one of the boxcars that carried 80 soldiers each for transport to other internment camps.

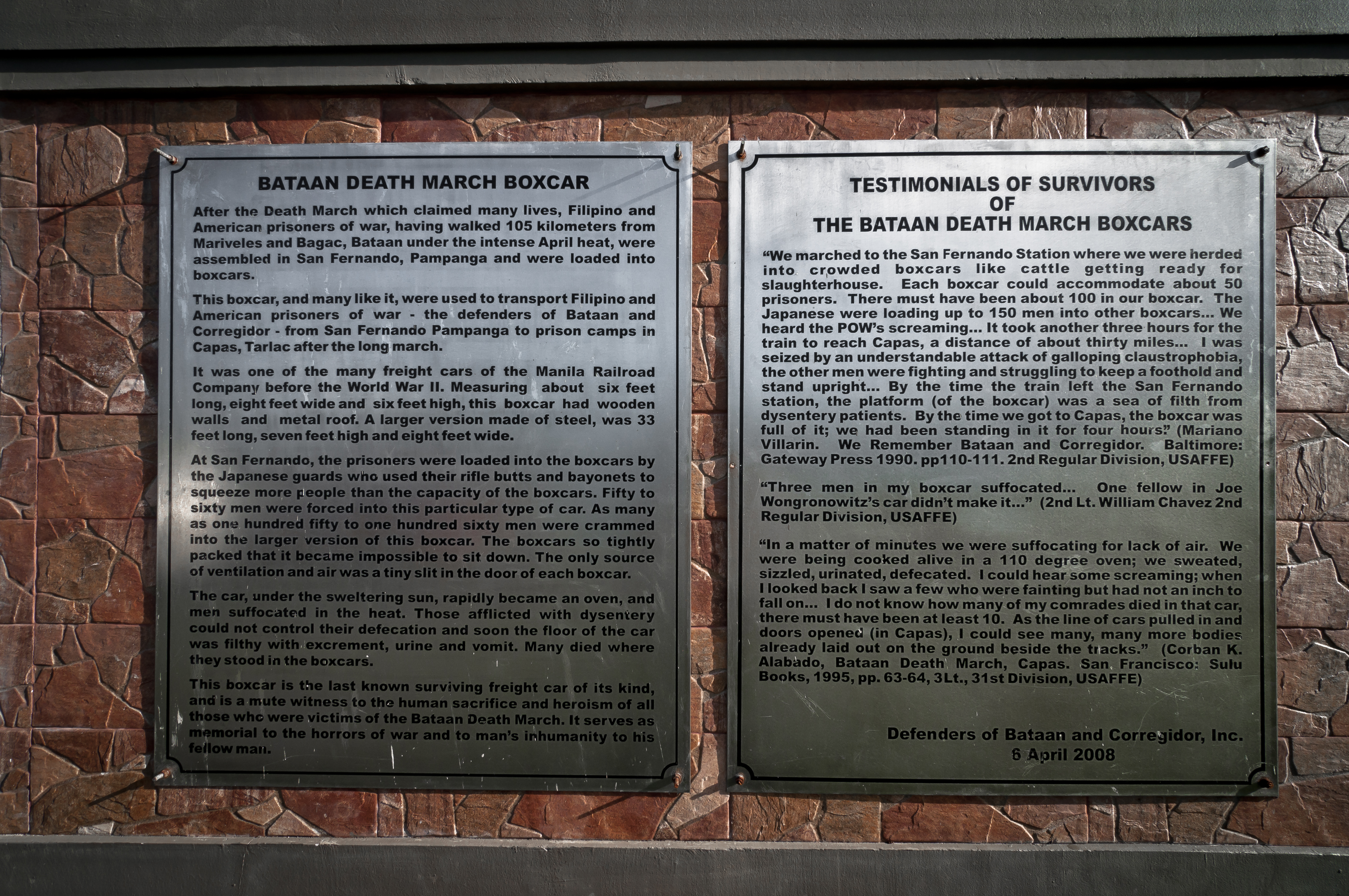
Placques of Bataan Death March testimonies at the boxcar relic house.

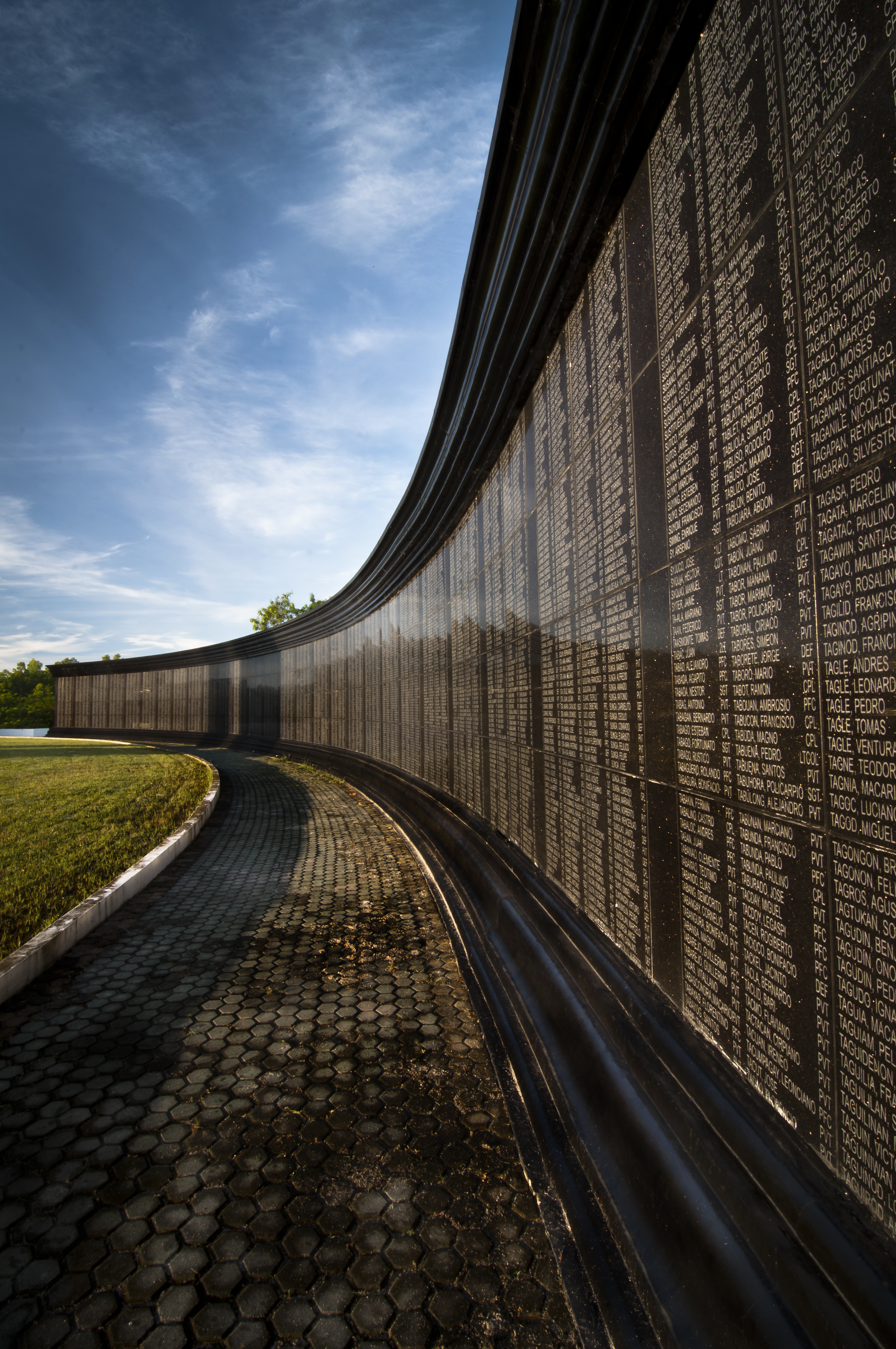
A part of the new black marble memorial wall around the Obelisk, engraved with names of soldiers who were incarcerated in the internment camp.

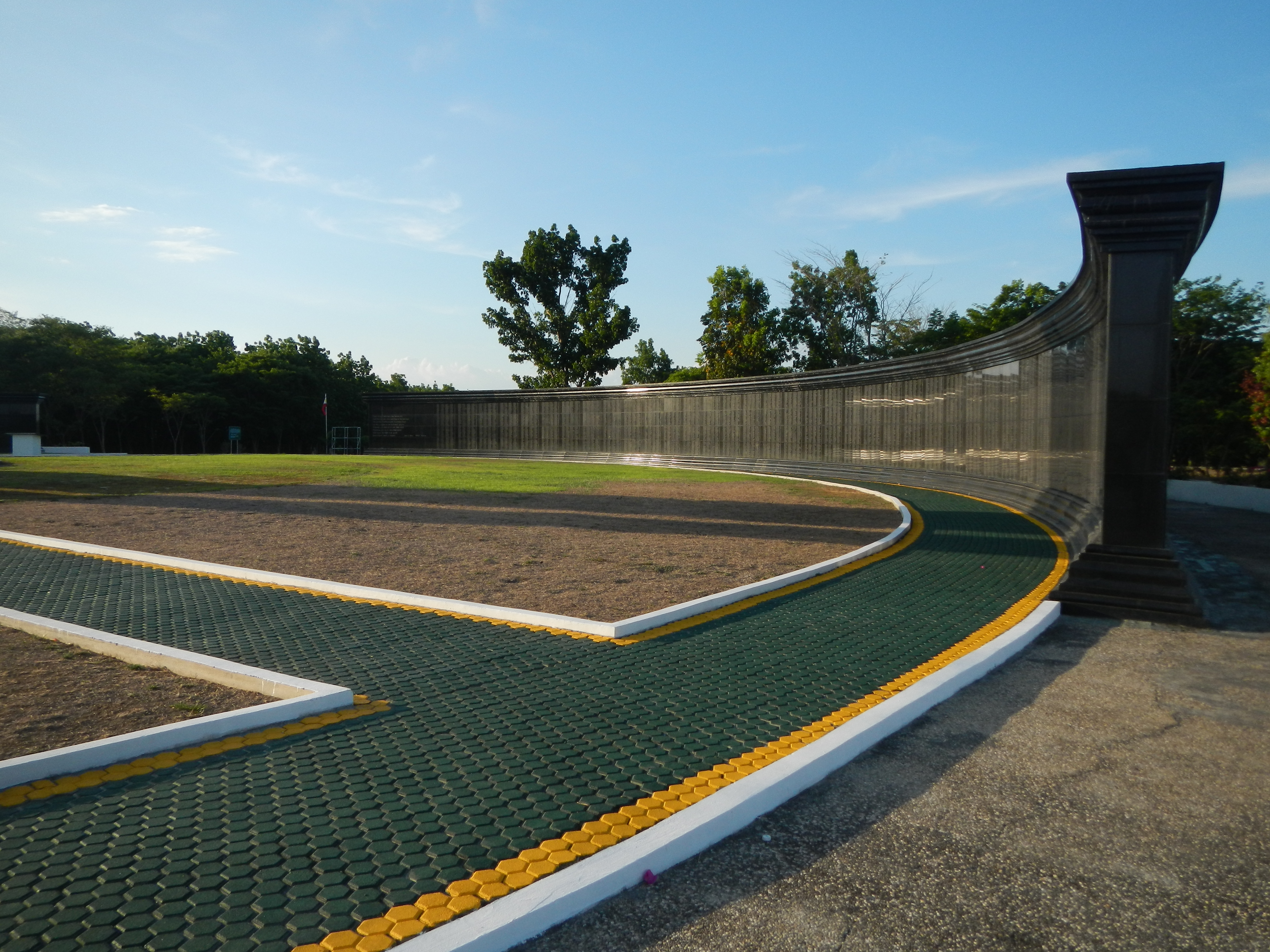
The west side of the marble memorial wall around the obelisk.

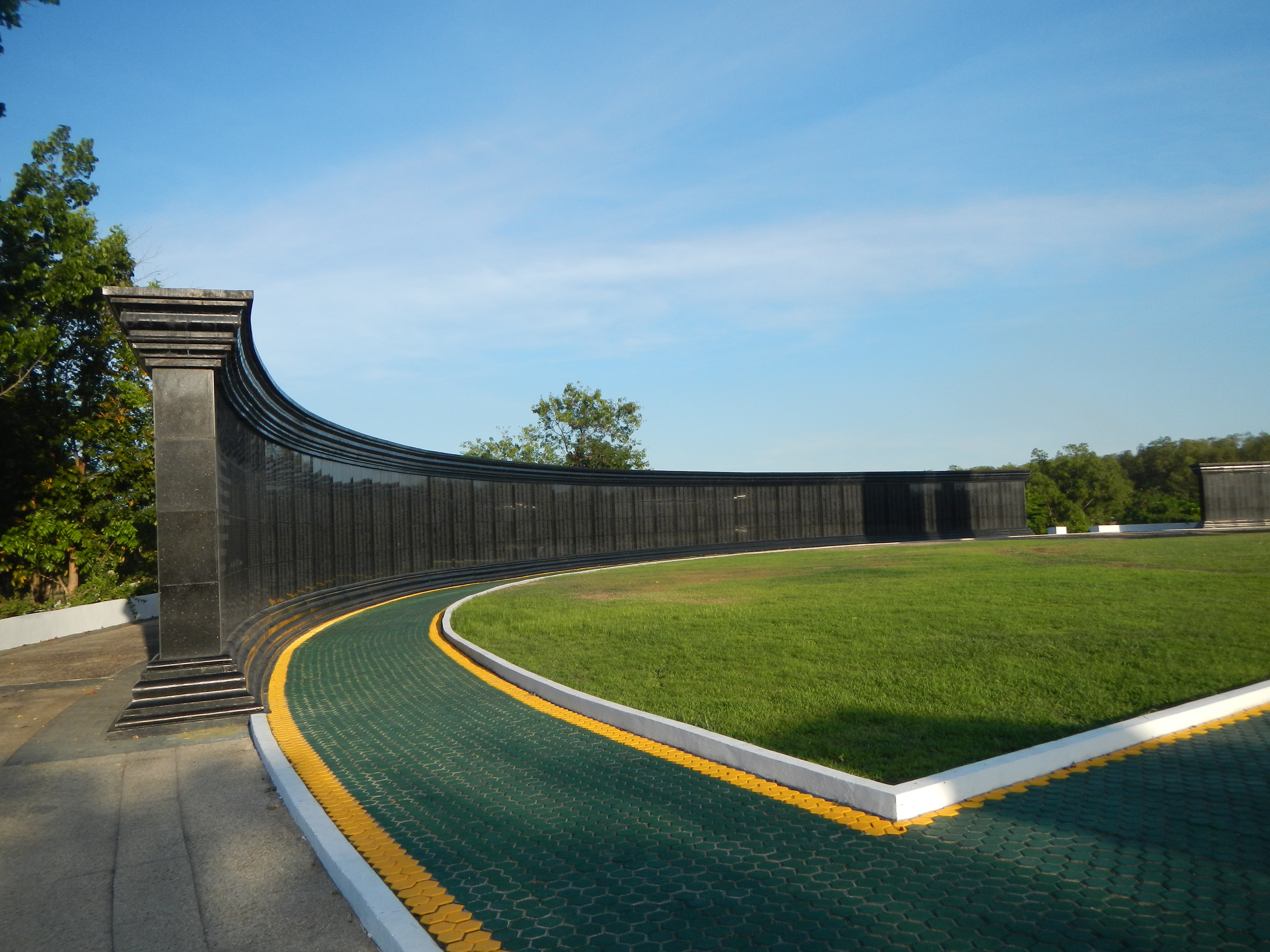
The east side of the memorial wall around the obelisk.

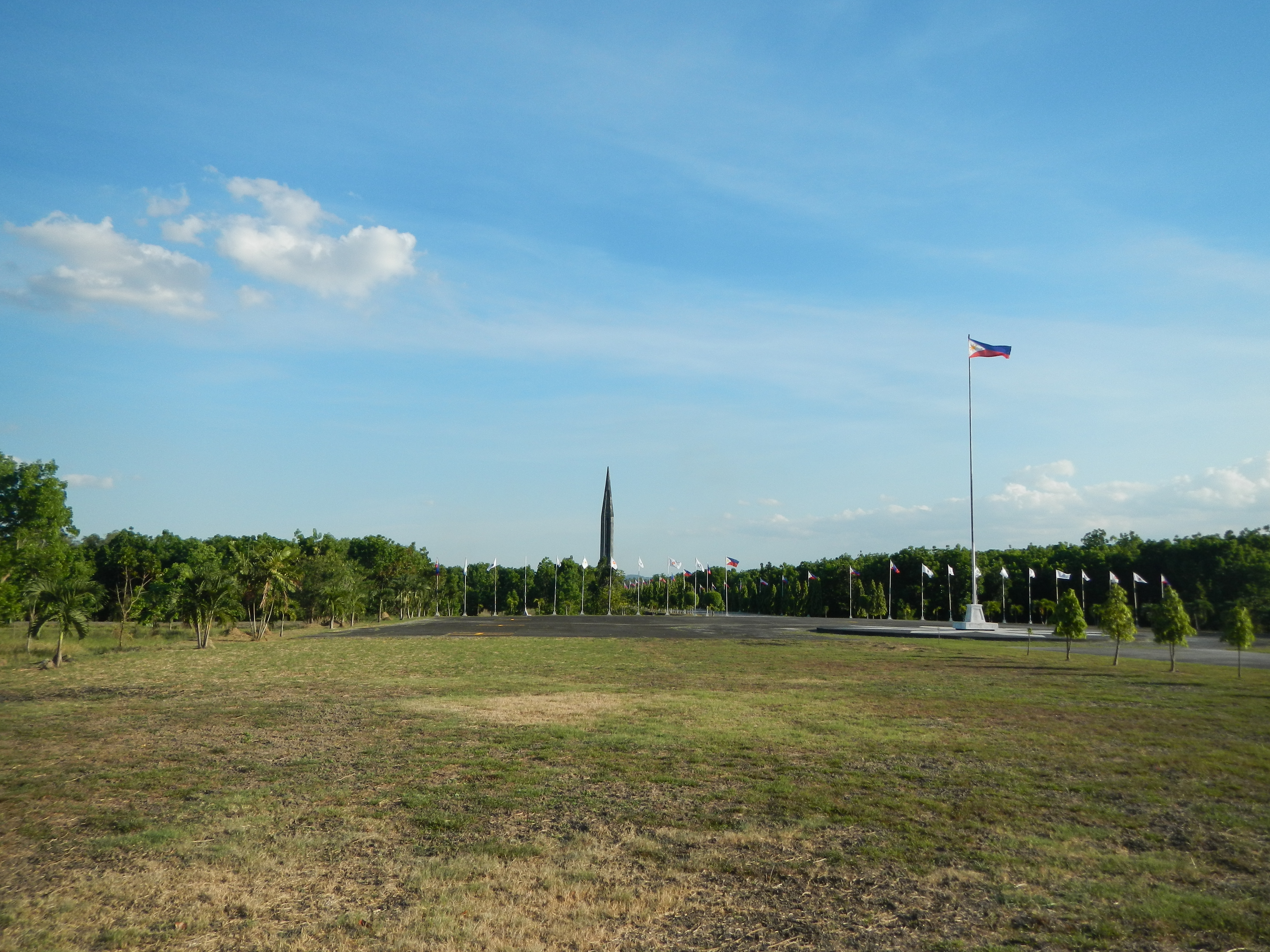
The flag at the shrine foregrounding the shrine's obelisk in the distance.

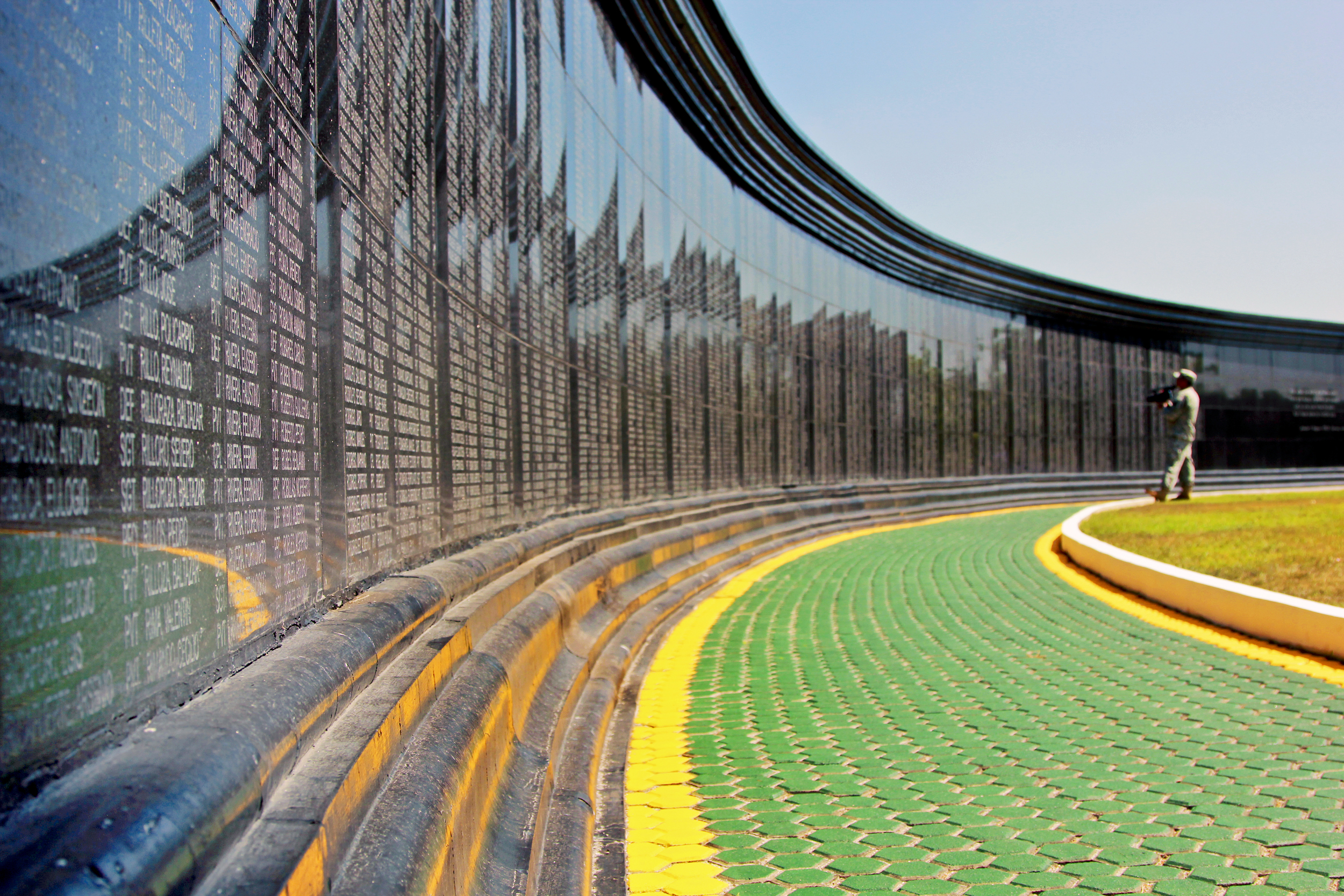
A part of the memorial wall with man standing before it.

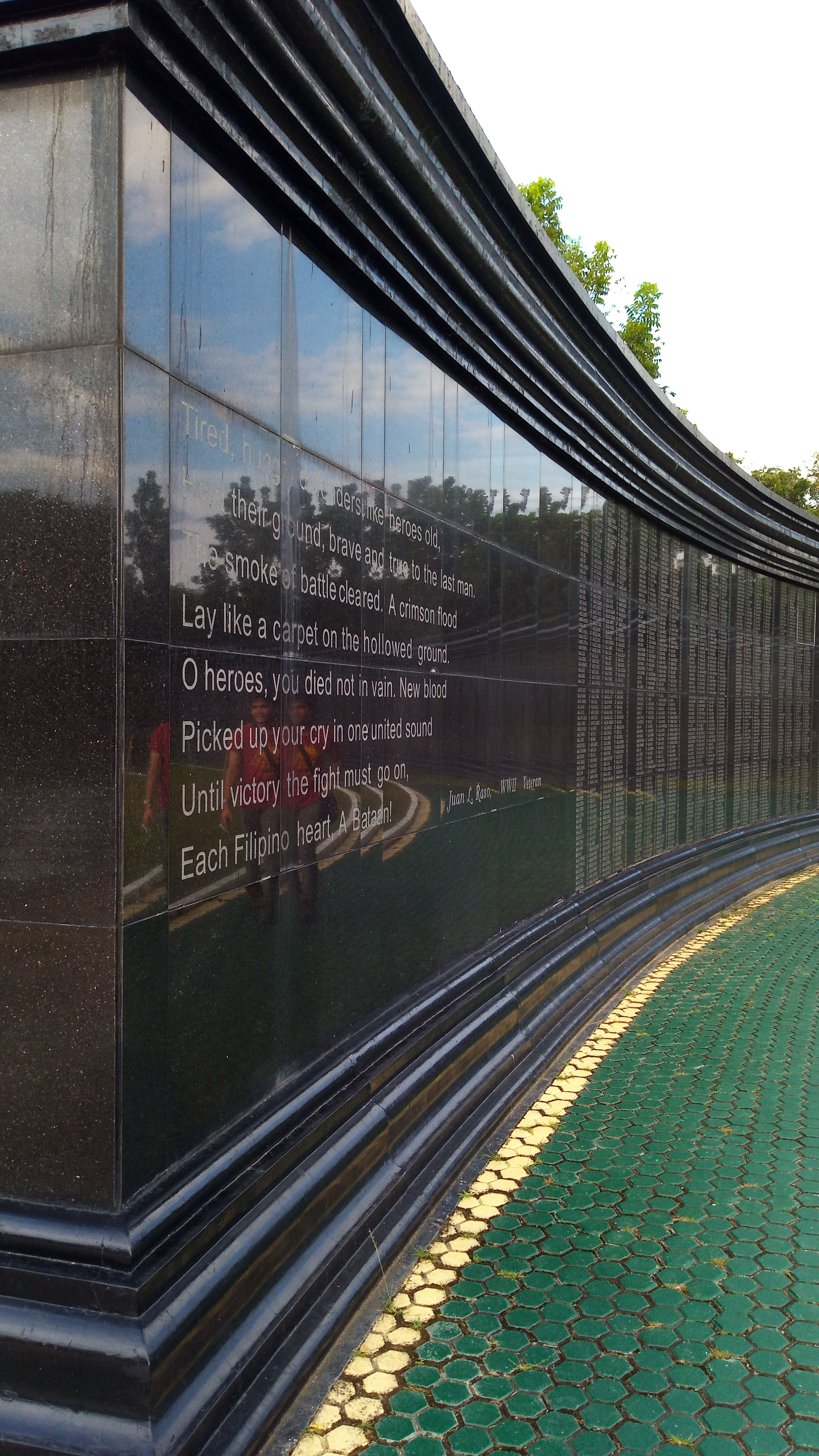
A poem by Juan L. Raso, a World War II veteran, at the entry way to the east side of the memorial wall.

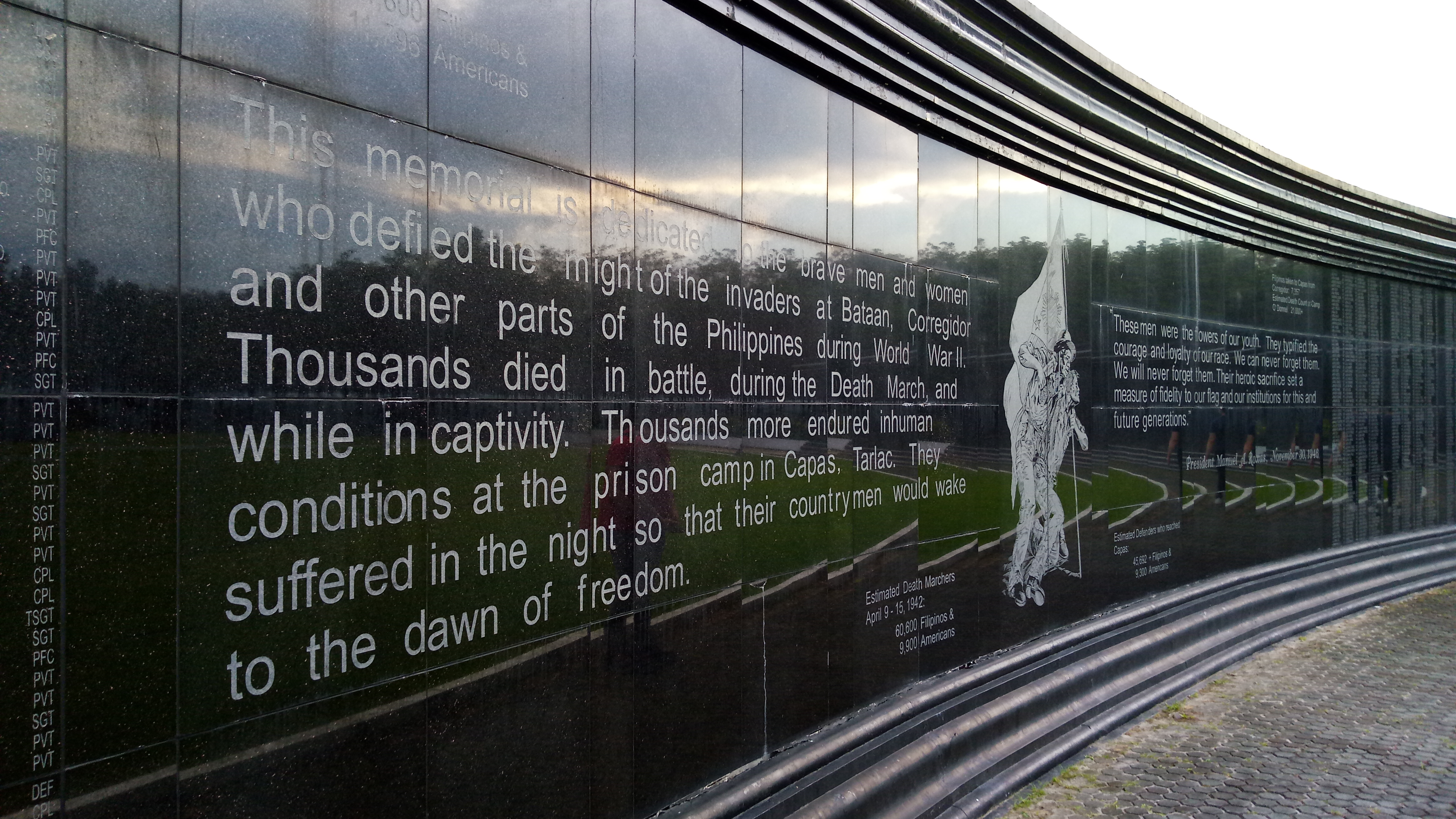
The dedication text and statistics engraved at the south side of the shrine's memorial wall.

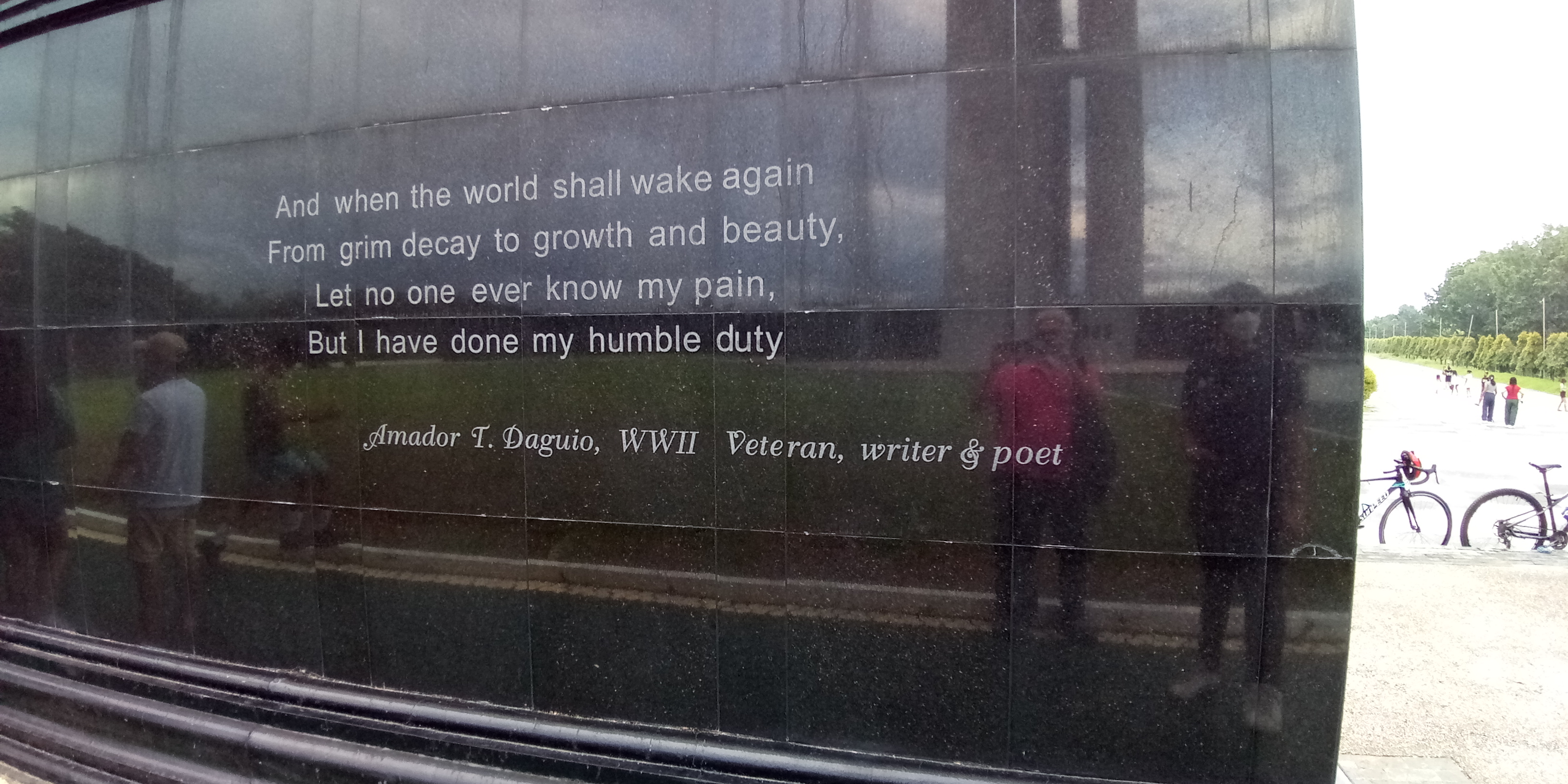
A verse from an Amador Daguio poem engraved on a part of the memorial wall's west side.

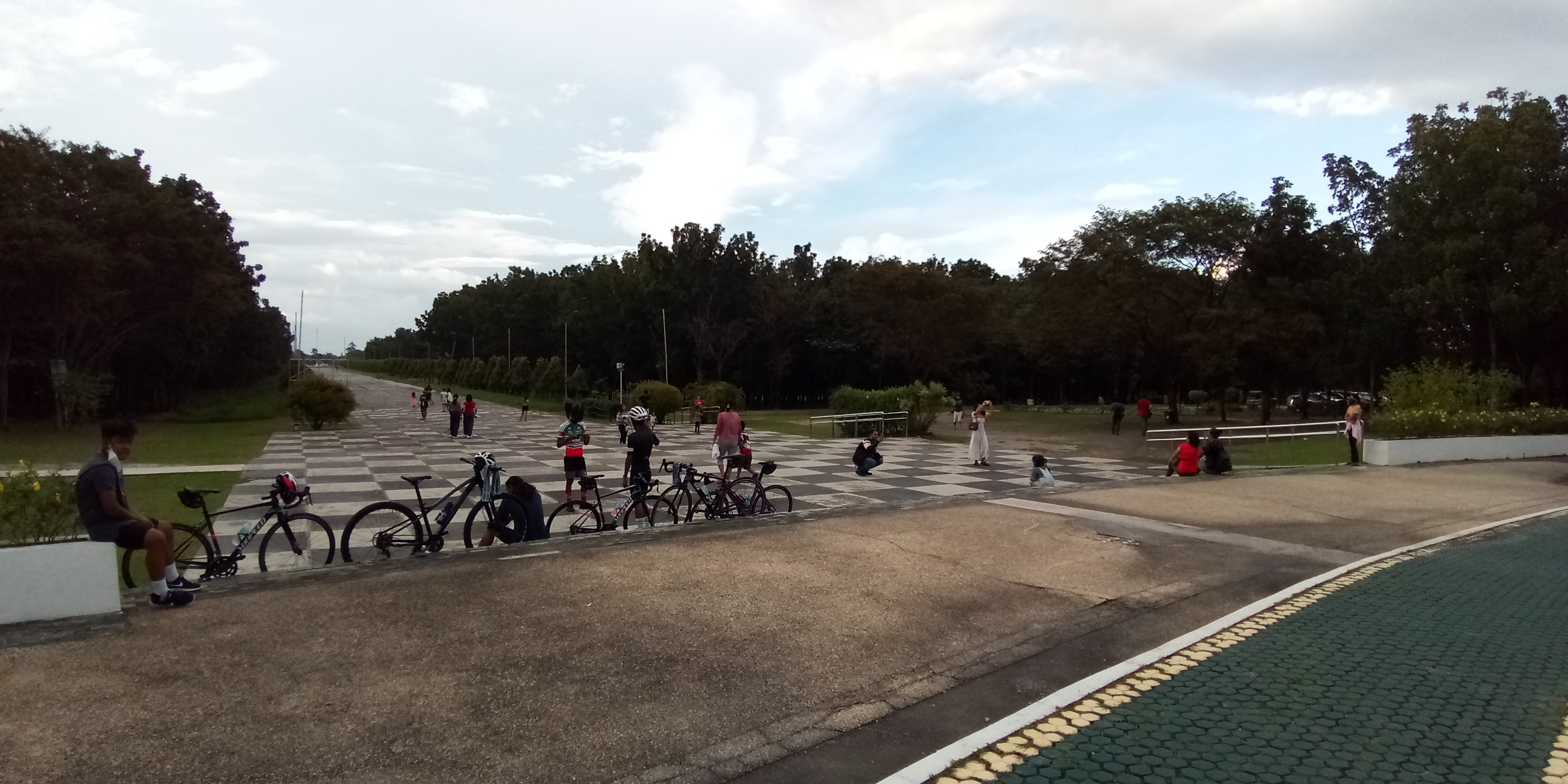
Visitors at the shrine, October 2022.

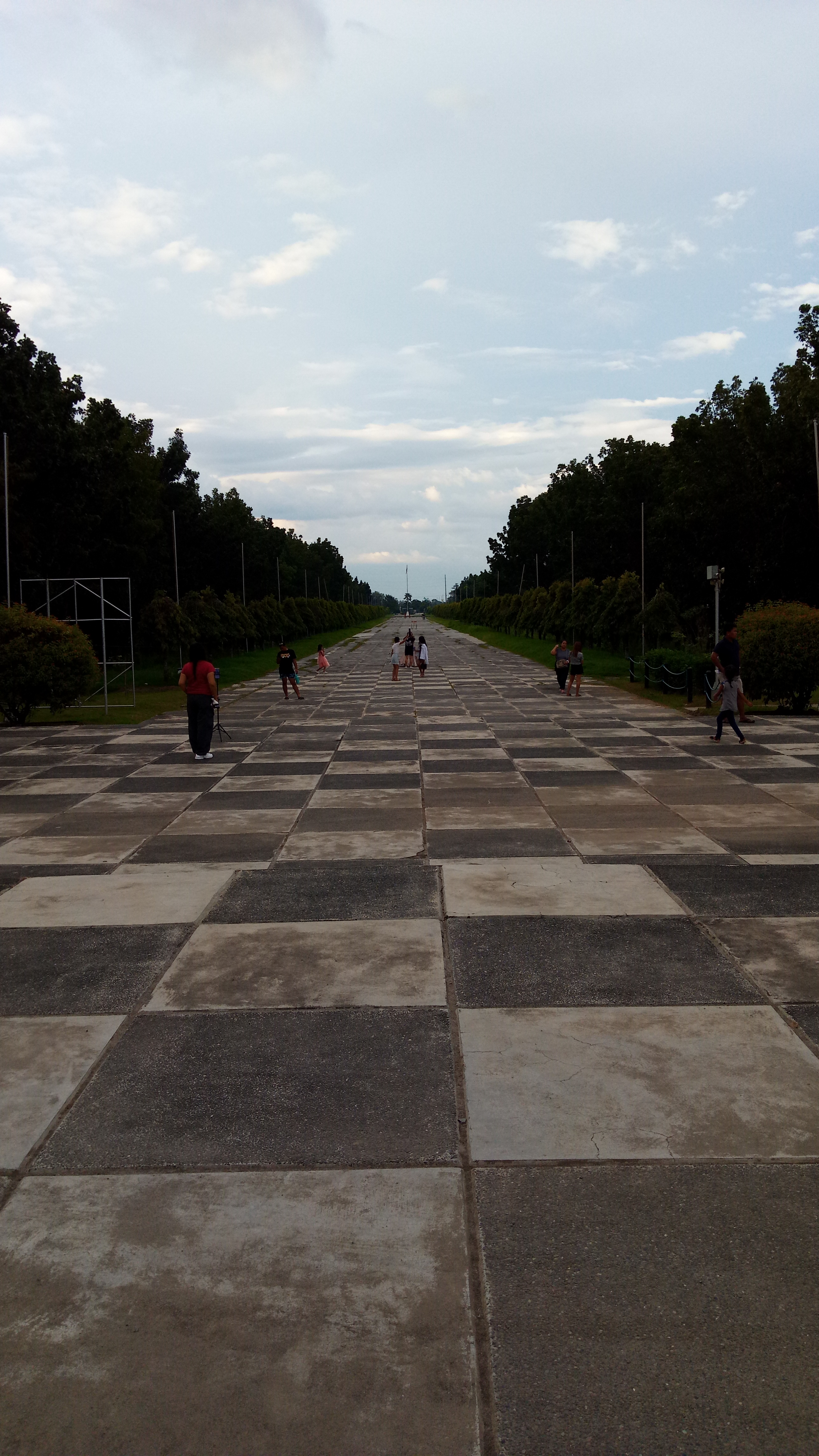
The long walkway from the Shrine's flag pole to the obelisk.

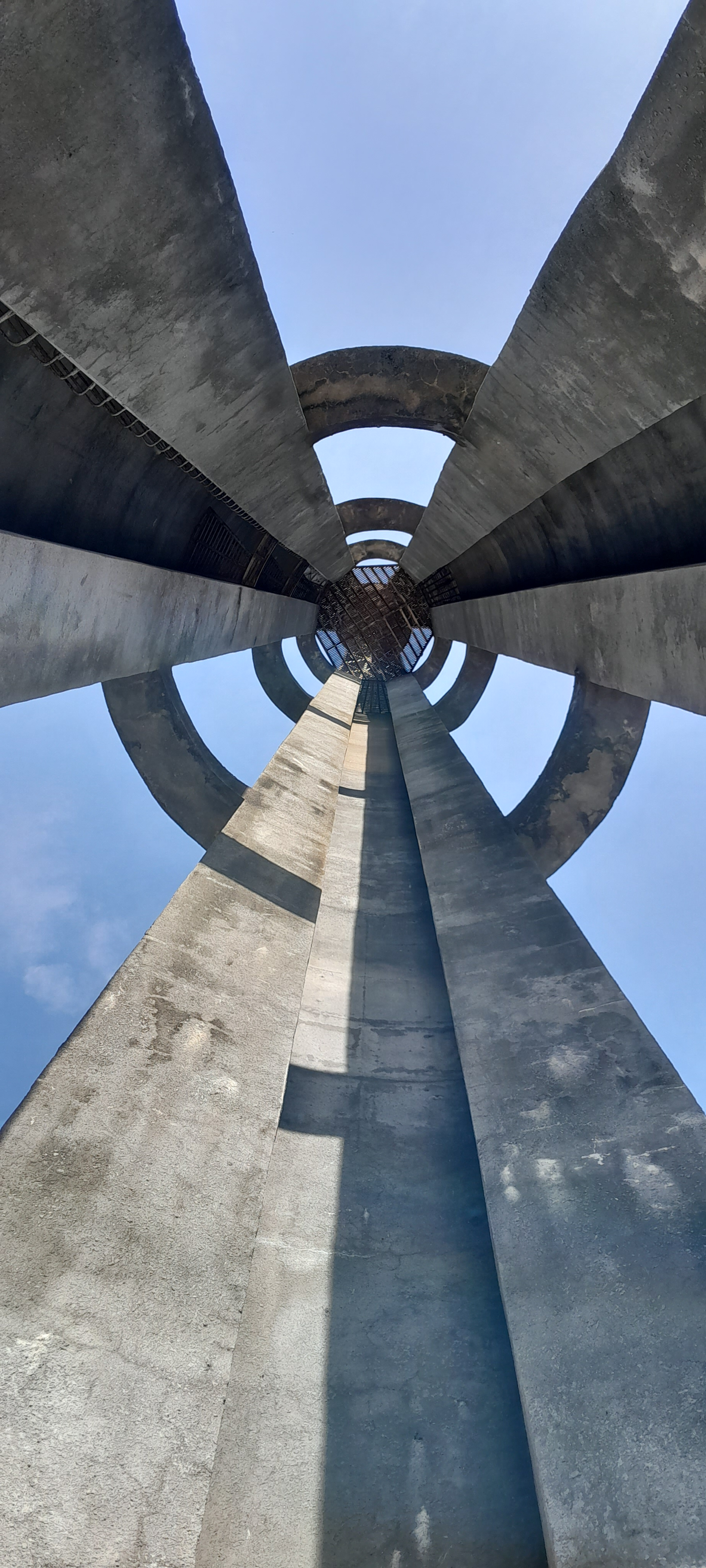
A view from inside the obelisk tower looking up.
