= U.S. Naval Radio Station, Tarlac =

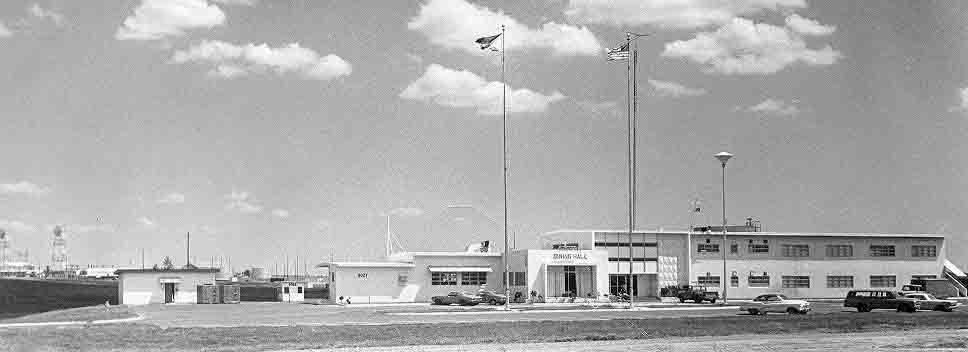
The U.S. Naval Radio Station, Tarlac in 1970

The U.S. Naval Radio Station, Tarlac, also known as the U.S. Naval Radio Transmitter Facility, Capas, Tarlac, was a remote unit of the U.S. Naval Communication Station Philippines (NavComStaPhil), located at 15.354114°N 120.536048°E, near the town of Capas, Tarlac Province, Luzon, Republic of the Philippines. The sole purpose of the station was to provide short-wave radio transmission capability for its parent communication station, that is, to be the radio voice for NavComStaPhil. It provided wide-area radio broadcasts, as well as dedicated, point-to-point radio transmissions to individual U.S. Navy ships in the vicinity of the Philippine Islands.

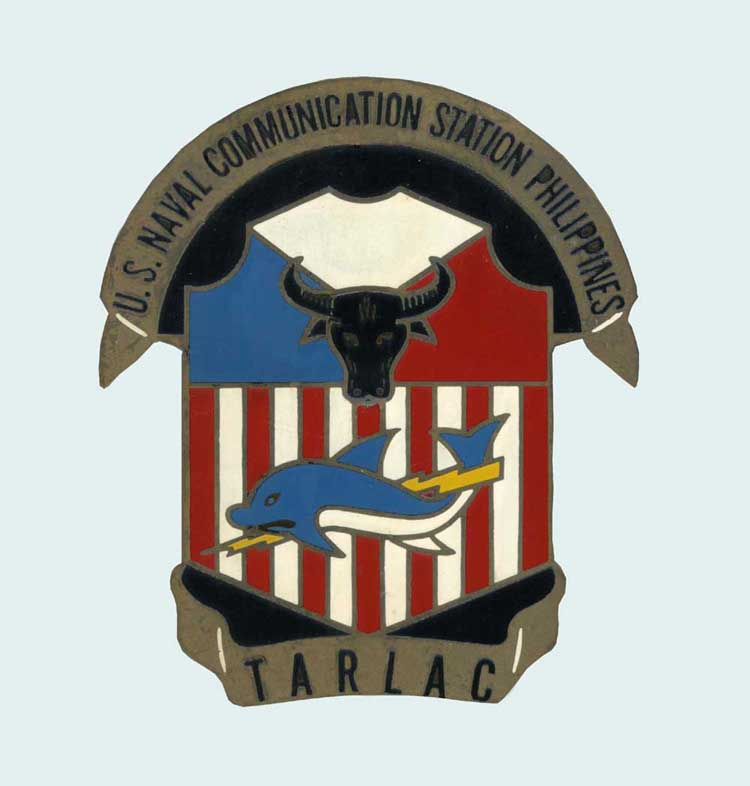
The Seal of the U.S. Naval Communication Station Philippines with Tarlac Radio Station unit name.

== Manpower ==
The station was operated and maintained by a combined workforce of U.S. Navy personnel, U.S. Marines, U.S. civilian contractors, and Filipino personnel.* U.S. Navy: 2 officers, 85 enlisted(1970).

- U.S. Marines: 3-4 enlisted, rotating in from NavComStaPhil (1972).
- U.S. civilian contractors: 2 (1970).
- Filipino employees: 212 (1970).
- K9 security patrol force: 2-3 German Shepherd dogs (1972).

== Base facilities ==
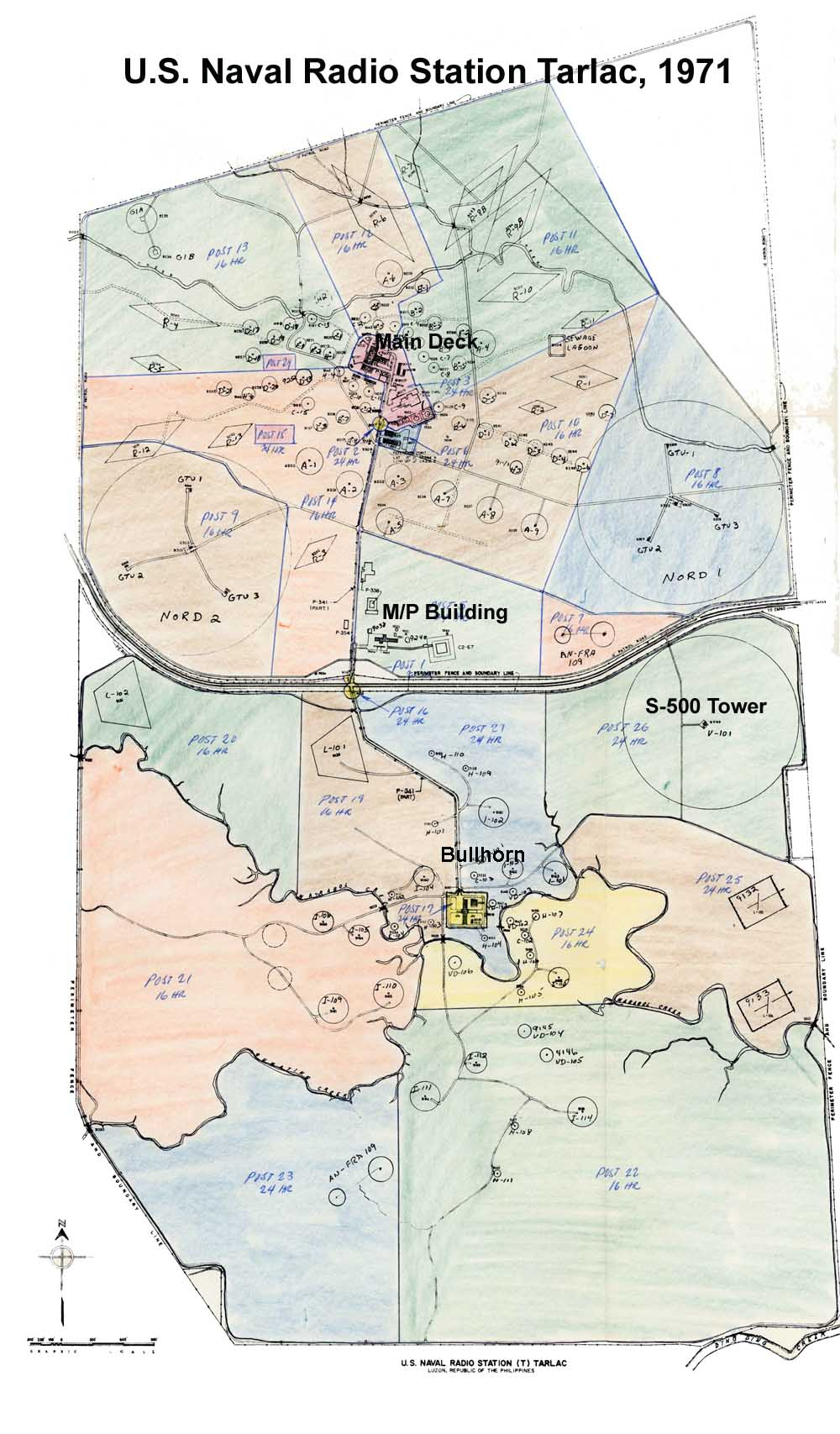
A map of the U.S. Naval Radio Station, Tarlac in 1971.

The station comprised 1,937 acres. The core of its transmission capability was located in two transmitter buildings. The primary building, referred to as "Main Deck", housed a large number of high power, high frequency (HF) transmitters. It also housed microwave radio-relay equipment for reception and distribution of data received from the NavComStaPhil for subsequent short-wave radio transmission. The secondary transmitter building, referred to as "Bull Horn", housed a smaller number of transmitters, but with similar capabilities to those at Main Deck. Additionally, the Bull Horn site held the S-500 transmitter trailer. The S-500, known affectionately as "Big Sam", was a high power, low frequency (LF) transmitter dedicated for fleet broadcast, capable of generating 500 kW of broadcast signal power. Radio transmitters employed at both sites were in the category of high-power output, meaning, they generated radio signal powers in the range from a few kilowatts (kW) to several 10's of kW, but the majority of transmitters operated at either 10 kW or 40 kW. A large number and variety of LF and HF antennas were used at both transmitter sites. These included directional (beam antennas), omnidirectional antennas, and tall antenna towers for dedicated, wide-area broadcast capability.

An extensive infrastructure supported the station. This included a multi-purpose building with barracks, administration offices, mess hall, navy exchange, and recreation room; An enlisted men's club, autonomous power generating facility, water and sewer treatment facilities, helicopter pad, and security posts. Eventually, a swimming pool and tennis court were added.

== Operations ==
Incoming messages to the station for subsequent radio transmission, were primarily multi-channel teletype data, with occasional voice signals. All incoming data was sent from the NavComStaPhil in San Miguel, and either originated there, or was relayed by them from some other point. The incoming data from San Miguel was relayed by a series of microwave relay sites: first from San Miguel to the Naval Relay Facility at Mt. Santa Rita, then to the Dau relay at Clark AFB, and finally to the radio station at Tarlac. Data assignment to individual transmitters, and pairing with individual antennas, was controlled via a teletype orderwire from San Miguel.

Some of the station's radio transmitters were utilized for wide area radio broadcasts using a single, constant radio frequency, while others provided dedicated radio transmissions, i.e. radio circuits, to individual Navy ships, using directional beam antennas. Transmitters assigned to individual ship circuits were often changed in frequency, as dictated by changing ionospheric conditions and resultant signal fading, or other tactical reasons.

== History ==
The radio station was built on land which before World War II been a part of Camp O'Donnell a U.S. Military reservation used as a bombing and artillery range. At the onset of World War II, the Philippine Armed Forces were brought under the jurisdiction of the U.S. Armed Forces, and the eastern portion of Camp O'Donnell was designated as a Philippine Army camp. After the surrender of the U.S. and Philippine forces at Bataan in early 1942, the army camp became an impromptu Japanese prisoner of war camp, and, in April 1942, was the final destination of the infamous Bataan Death March. From April 1942 until June 1942, approximately 9,000 U.S. military personnel, and 50,000 Filipino soldiers were interned there; during that time, over 1,500 of the Americans and 20,000 of the Filipinos died at the camp. Eventually, the death toll would climb to 1,565 Americans and 26,000 Filipinos. The cause of the deaths ranged from malnutrition, dysentery, malaria, lack of medical care, and execution. The Japanese Army segregated the Americans on the north side of the camp, and Filipinos on the south side. A large concrete cross monument marked the site of a cemetery for the Americans who died there, and a similar monument marked the Filipino graves. The American cemetery memorial marker has since been relocated to the POW museum at Andersonville, Georgia. Beginning in 1945, the remains of the fallen American prisoners were reinterred at Fort William McKinley, near Manila, or, at the request of next of kin, in cemeteries in the United States.

The station began operation in 1962, assuming radio transmitter responsibilities when U.S. Naval Radio Station Bagobantay was deactivated. The station closed in 1989. Some time later, the northern half of the former station, became a civilian residential area. And, on December 7, 1991, a portion of the southern section of the base was established as the Capas National Shrine, by Philippine President Corazon Aquino.
