= Camp O'Donnell =

Military camp in Capas, Tarlac, Philippines

- Sta. Lucia, Capas, Tarlac, Philippines
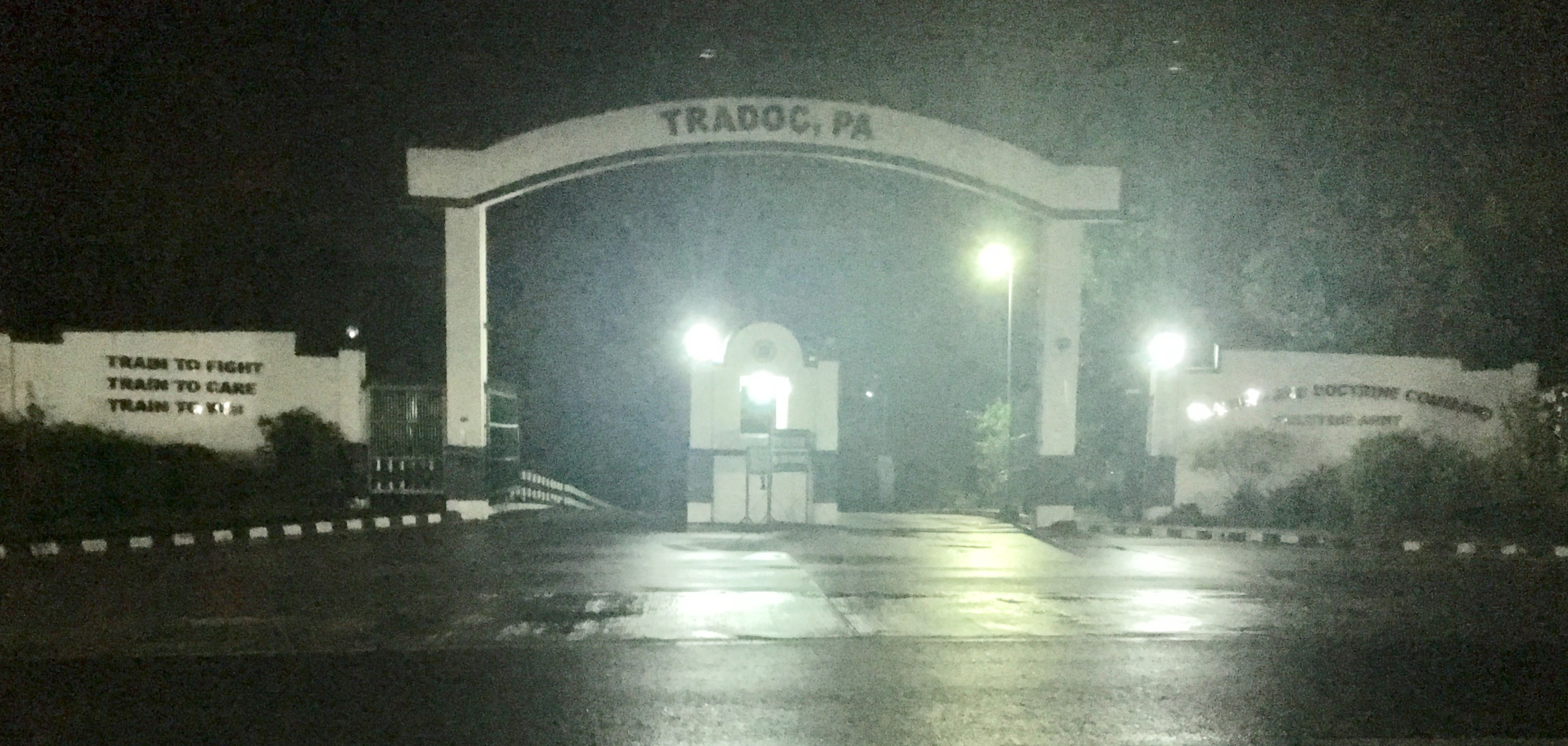
- Facade of the Training Command, Philippine Army

Site information
- Type: Military base
- Controlled by: Philippine Armed Forces

Site history
- Built: 1941
- In use: 1941–present
- Materials: Concrete and Metal
- Battles/wars: World War II; Korean War; Vietnam War

Garrison information
- Garrison: Training and Doctrine Command, AFP (PA, PN, PAF); Armor Division, PA; 71st Division, PA (1941–1942)

Camp O'Donnell is a current military base and former United States military reservation in the Philippines located on Luzon island in the municipality of Capas in Tarlac. It housed the Philippine Army's newly created 71st Division and after the Americans' return, a United States Army camp. During World War II, the reservation was used as a prisoner-of-war camp for Filipino and American soldiers captured by Japan during its successful invasion of the Philippines. About 60,000 Filipino and 9,000 Americans were housed at the camp. During the few months in 1942 that Camp O'Donnell was used as a prisoner-of-war camp, about 20,000 Filipinos and 1,500 Americans died there of disease, starvation, neglect, and brutality.

After World War II, it became a base of the United States Air Force and the location of the U.S. Naval Radio Station, Tarlac, with the Philippine Army installation occupying its eastern side. It housed the Training Command's Philippine Army Officer Candidate School, NCO Academy, and Headquarters Service Battalion.

== Establishment ==
In August 1941, Camp O'Donnell was built on a 250-hectare plot of land about 65 miles north of Manila, the capital city of the Philippines. The camp's development was overseen by the Philippine Department's U.S. Army Engineer.

When the camp was first constructed, it was meant to house the 71st Infantry Division of the Philippine Army. When the camp's inmates were ordered to repel the approaching Japanese forces, building on the facility was put on hold.

== World War II ==
Camp O'Donnell
- Concentration camp
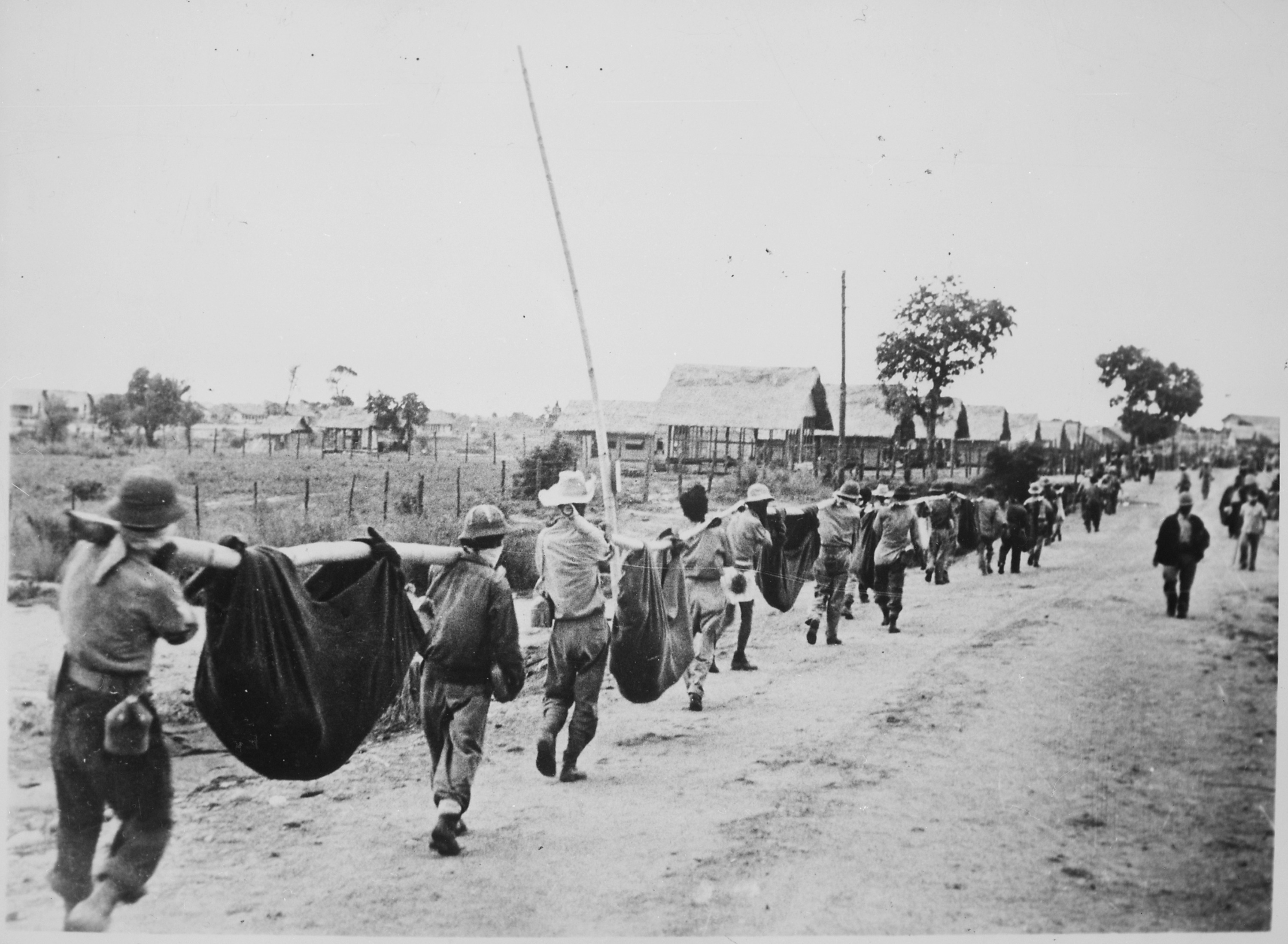
- A photo of what is believed to be a burial detail at Camp O'Donnell

- Location within Luzon Location within Philippines
- Coordinates: 15°22′33″N 120°30′43″E
- Known for: Bataan Death March
- Location: Capas, Tarlac, Japanese-occupied Philippines
- Built by: Philippine Department
- Operated by: Imperial Japanese Army
- Commandant: Capt. Yoshio Tsuneyoshi
- Original use: Philippine Army base
- Operational: April 1942 – January 1943
- Inmates: Prisoner of War
- Number of inmates: 70,000 (est.)
- Killed: 21,684 Filipinos (est.); 1,488 Americans
- Liberated by: United States Army; Philippine Commonwealth Army; Philippine Constabulary

Camp O'Donnell was the destination of the Filipino and American soldiers who surrendered after the Battle of Bataan on April 9, 1942. The Japanese took approximately 70,000 prisoners: 60,000 Filipinos and 9,000 Americans. The prisoners were forced to undertake the Bataan Death March of approximately 145 kilometres (90 mi) to arrive at Camp O'Donnell. Many soldiers died during the march and the survivors arrived at the camp in extremely poor condition.

The first Filipino and American prisoners-of-war arrived at Camp O'Donnell on April 11, 1942, and were welcomed by the Camp Commandant, Capt. Yoshio Tsuneyoshi. The Japanese military leadership was ill-prepared to handle the incarceration of almost 70,000 Prisoners of War, and did not have the logistics or facilities prepared at the camp to support such influx of population. Aside from the limited barracks to house the POWs, the facilities lacked a proper hospital facility, water system, sewer system, and dining facilities.

The Filipinos and Americans were housed in separate sections of the camp. There was a constant movement in and out of the camp as the Japanese transferred prisoners to other locations on work details. In June, most of the American POWs were sent to other POW camps or to work sites scattered around the country and ultimately to Japan and other countries. From September 1942 to January 1943, Japan paroled the Filipino POWs. They signed an oath not to become guerrillas, and the mayors of their home towns were made responsible for their conduct as parolees. Japan closed Camp O'Donnell as a POW camp on January 20, 1943.

The POWs at Camp O'Donnell died in large numbers for a number of reasons. Japanese soldiers rarely surrendered and held those who did in contempt. The Japanese soldier was the product of a brutal military system in which physical punishment was common and so they treated the POWs accordingly. Moreover, the Filipino and American soldiers arriving at Camp O'Donnell were in poor physical condition and had survived on short rations for several months. Many were suffering from malaria and other diseases. The Japanese had made little provision for the treatment of prisoners and were surprised at the large number that they captured. They had believed the force opposing them in Bataan was much smaller and that the prisoners would number only about 10,000, rather than the 70,000 or more who were actually captured. The Japanese were unprepared to provide the POWs with adequate food, shelter, and medical treatment. Japanese military leadership was inattentive to the POWs and were preoccupied with completing their conquest of the Philippines. Moreover, the Japanese declined to treat the POWs in accordance with the Geneva Convention of 1929, which Japan had signed but had not ratified.

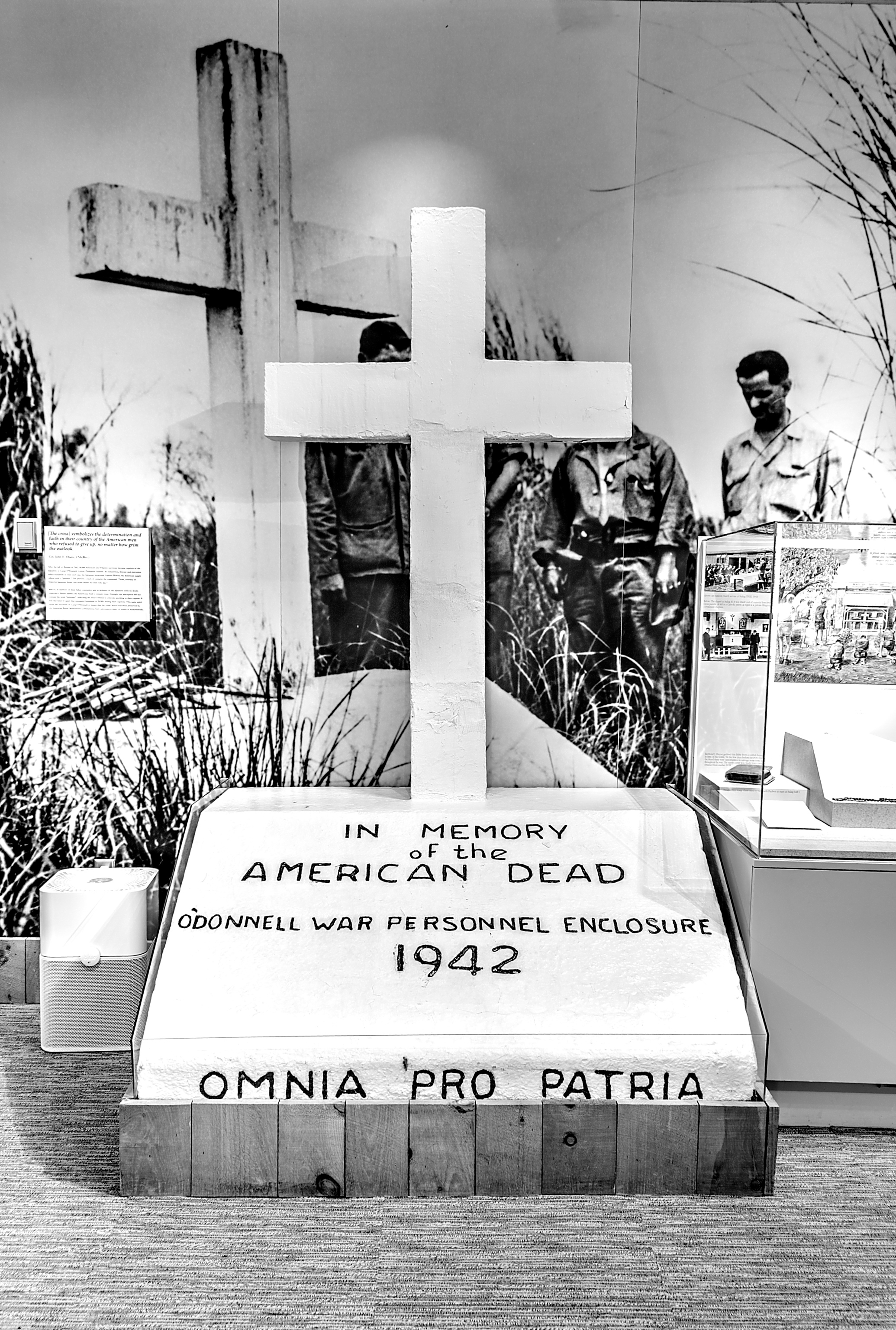
Memorial at National Prisoner of War Museum

Conditions at Camp O'Donnell were primitive. The POWs lived in bamboo huts, sleeping on the bamboo floor often without any covering. There was no plumbing; water was scarce. Weakened by malaria, dysentery was rampant. Medicine was in short supply. Food consisted of rice and vegetable soup, occasionally with shreds of water buffalo meat. The diet provided about 1,500 calories daily and was deficient in protein and vitamins. Vitamin deficiency illnesses such as beri-beri and pelagra developed among many. The Japanese refused most offers of assistance for the POWs, including from the Philippine Red Cross.

The consequences of the hardships were thousands of POW deaths. Filipino deaths were much higher in numbers and percentages; as many as 20,000 Filipinos died. For the Americans, the deadliest period was the end of May with more than 40 soldiers dying each day. The number of Americans who died at Camp O'Donnell is not precisely known; 1,547 American deaths were recorded, about one sixth of the total number of American POWs, but the camp's American adjutant, Capt. John E. Olson, estimated that some 20–30 more were unrecorded.

The American POWs at Camp O'Donnell were moved to new POW camps near Cabanatuan. About 120 senior officers, including General Wainwright, commander of U.S. forces in the Philippines, were taken to a camp near Tarlac City after their surrender at Corregidor in May 1942.

On June 19, 1942, the Filipino swimmer Teófilo Yldefonso, who won the country's first ever Olympic medal, died at the camp aged 38.

Camp O'Donnell was recaptured by the United States Army, the Philippine Commonwealth Army, and the Philippine Constabulary on January 30, 1945.

== War Crimes Trial ==
After the surrender of Japan, Capt. Yoshio Tsuneyoshi, who was a graduate of the Imperial Japanese Army Academy Class of 1915, was captured in Japan and brought to the military tribunal under the 8th United States Army in Yokohama. He pleaded not guilty towards the charges in contributing to the death of 1,461 American military personnel incarcerated in Camp O'Donnell. On November 21, 1947, he was found guilty and sentenced to death. His sentence was later reduced to life imprisonment and hard labor. He was later transferred to the Philippines to face the military tribunal under the Philippine Army, pled guilty of the charges for the death of 21,000 Filipino POWs, and was sentenced to life imprisonment on July 19, 1949. On July 4, 1953, Pres. Elpidio Quirino included him in the list of pardoned Japanese war criminals, but was to continue his sentence in Sugamo Prison in Tokyo.

== Later history ==
Camp O'Donnell was later transferred to the U.S. Air Force and became home to the 3rd Tactical Electronic Warfare Training Squadron, the Pacific Air Forces Electronic Warfare Range, and the Crow Valley Range Complex. Operating Location Delta (OL-D) of the 1961st Communications Group was also located at Camp O'Donnell. OL-D provided communications support to Camp O'Donnell, the Crow Valley Range Complex, worldwide high-frequency military transmitters and microwave relay support Voice of America broadcasts out of the Philippines.

The former internment camp is the location for the Capas National Shrine which was built and is maintained by the Philippine government as a memorial to the Filipino and American soldiers who died there. A huge obelisk now stands as a grave marker on the original site of the camp, which charges an entrance fee of less than Ph₱20 per head. In 2016, the Bases Conversion and Development Authority commenced construction work of New Clark City at the former American camp.

The location is currently the headquarters of the Philippine Army's Armor "Pambato" Division and Training Command.

== See also ==
- Crow Valley Gunnery Range
- Clark Air Base
- Mount Samat Shrine
