= Naval Station San Miguel =

Station of the Philippine Navy in Zambales

Coordinates: 14°57′24″N 120°03′58″E

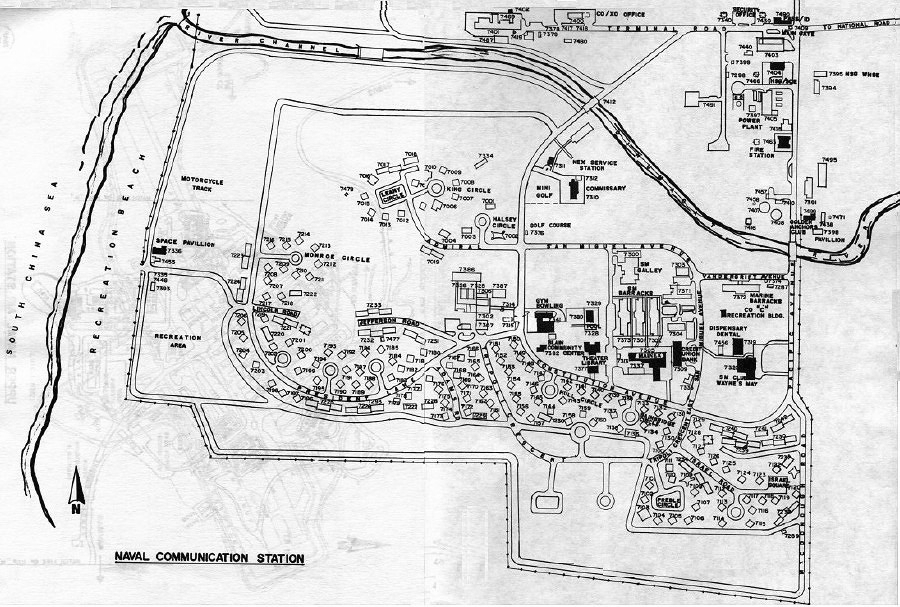
NAVCOMSTAPHIL in 1990

Naval Station San Miguel is an installation of the Philippine Navy located in Barangay San Miguel, San Antonio, Zambales, Philippines. The United States turned over the base to the Philippine government in 1992. The Philippine's first BrahMos anti-ship missile complex will reportedly be located at the base.

== History ==
The U.S. Naval Communication Station, Philippines (NAVCOMSTAPHIL) had been established in the Philippines for a number of years. Construction at San Miguel began in early 1955. The preactivation detail moved to San Miguel from Sangley Point RP in July 1957 and the balance of the officers and men moved in increments. In January 1958 operations at Sangley Point were terminated and full scale operations at San Miguel commenced.

The base was named for the tiny fishing village of San Miguel which is adjacent to the southern end of the station. The base is located in a semicircular bowl of 1,737 acres (7.03 km^{2}), surrounded by mountains on three sides, and the South China Sea on the fourth.

The primary purpose of the station was to provide communications to U.S. Navy ships operating in the area of the Philippines.

During the Vietnam War, all communications from Vietnam to the Continental United States were routed first through here by an undersea cable from Nha Trang, then forwarded to Naval Link Station Mount Santa Rita, then to the Dau relay facility at Clark AFB, and finally to the HF transmitter site at the U.S. Naval Radio Station Tarlac also known as U.S. Naval Radio Transmitter Facility, Capas, Tarlac.

The base also housed a Marine barracks.

The United States turned over the base to the Philippine government in 1992. After its turnover, the Philippine Navy (PN), subsequently transferred its Naval Training Command from Fort San Felipe, Cavite to Naval Station San Miguel. It is now the home of the Philippine Navy's Naval Education, Training and Doctrine Command.

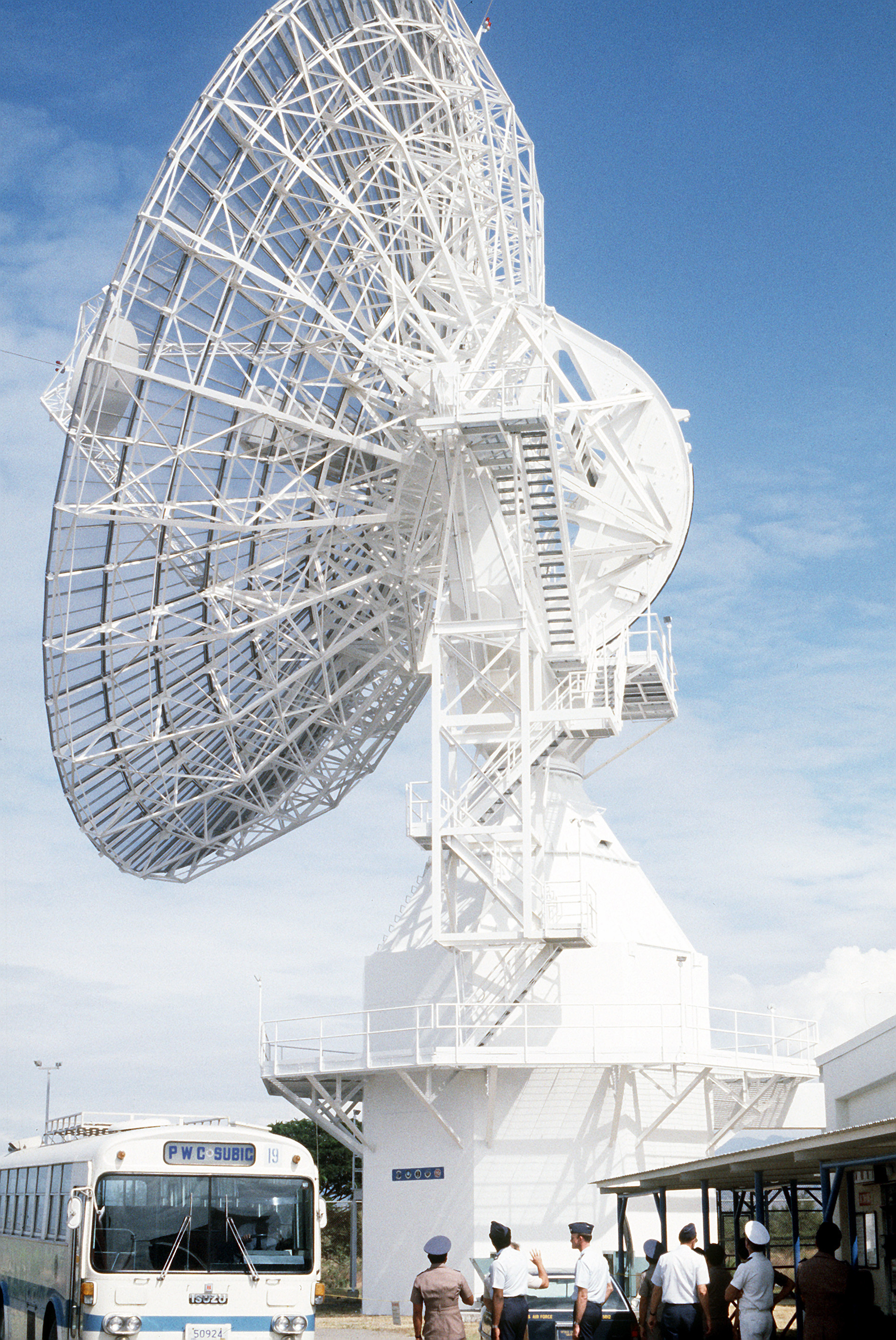
A U.S. Air Force Project Space Track dish antenna at San Miguel

== BrahMos Missile Base ==
In June 2024, it was reported that Philippine's first BrahMos anti-ship missile base was in the process of being built around 3 kilometers to the north of the complex, on a patch of waste ground close to the Philippine Merchant Marine Academy. The location is approximately 250 kilometers from the Scarborough Shoal and approximately 800 kilometers from the Spratly Islands, where the Philippines currently has territorial disputes with China over several islands (such as Subi Reef).

Although the Scarborough Shoal is well within the estimated 290 kilometer range of the BrahMos, the fact that the armed forces of the Philippines currently lacks over-the-horizon radar implies that drones (including the Boeing Insitu ScanEagle) and maritime patrol aircraft (including the ATR 72) will instead be used for reconnaissance and target acquisition, thus limiting the effective range BrahMos of in a combat situation.

== See also ==
- U.S. Naval Radio Facility Bagobantay
- US Naval Communication Facility, San Miguel, Philippines - "Welcome Aboard" Handbook 1958
