= U.S. Naval Radio Facility Bagobantay =

Communications facility in Quezon City, Philippines

U.S. Naval Radio Facility Bagobantay was a communications facility of the United States Navy that was located in Quezon City, Philippines.

== History ==
Bagobantay Naval Radio Facility was located on the outskirts of Quezon City and sat on the site where a Philippine Exposition was once held before World War II.

Bagobantay was the transmitting facility of Naval Communications Station San Miguel and was located on the outskirts of Quezon City. Besides being home to an expansive antenna field, Bagobantay was a small self-contained town with its own power plant, officers' and enlisted men's club, fire station, motor pool, golf course, and basketball and tennis courts.

The facility was closed in 1962 after the Naval Communication Transmitting Facility, Capas in Tarlac became fully operational. Its former site is now occupied by SM City North EDSA.
