= Negros Occidental =

Province in the Philippines

Negros Occidental Nakatungdang Negros
- Province
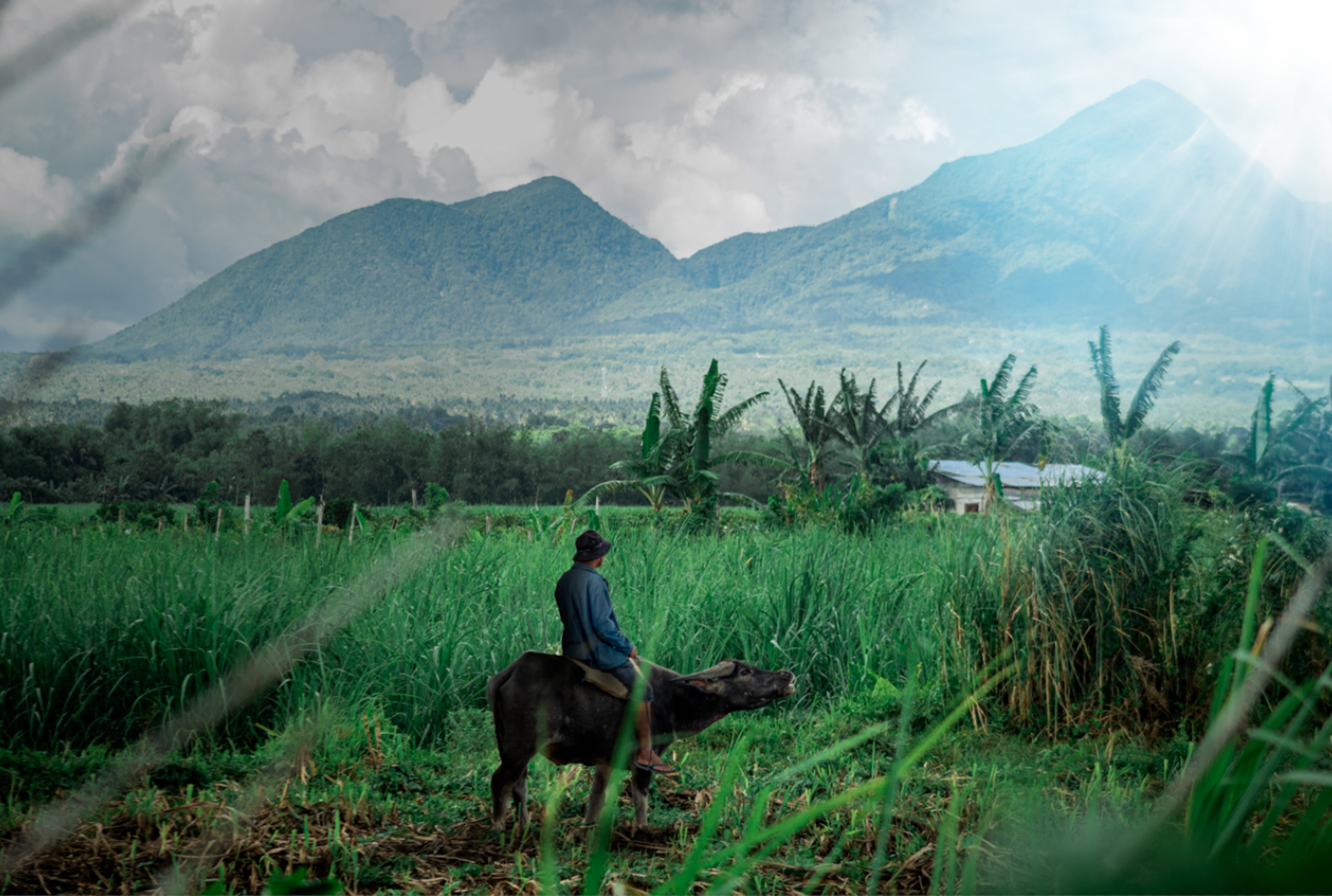
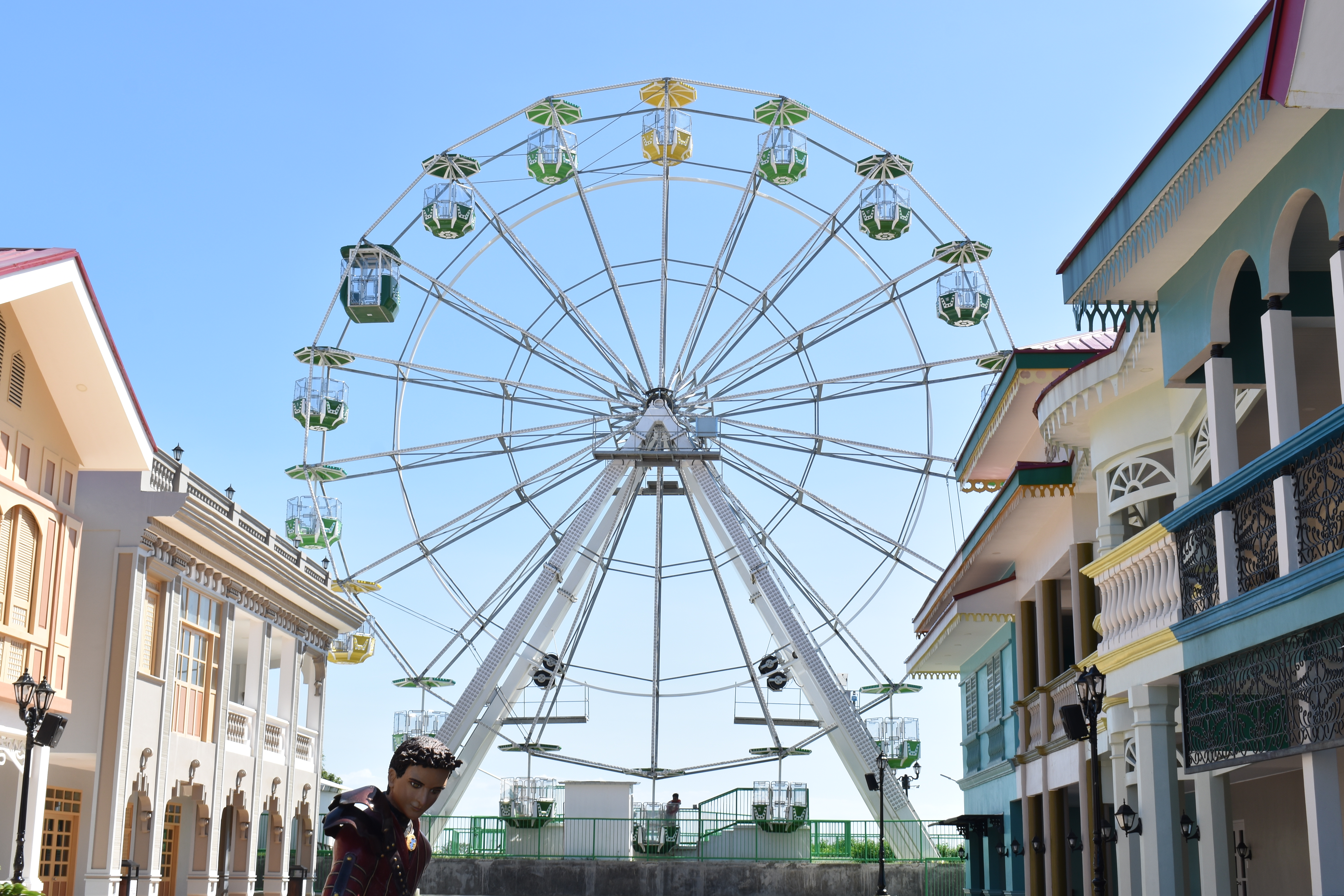
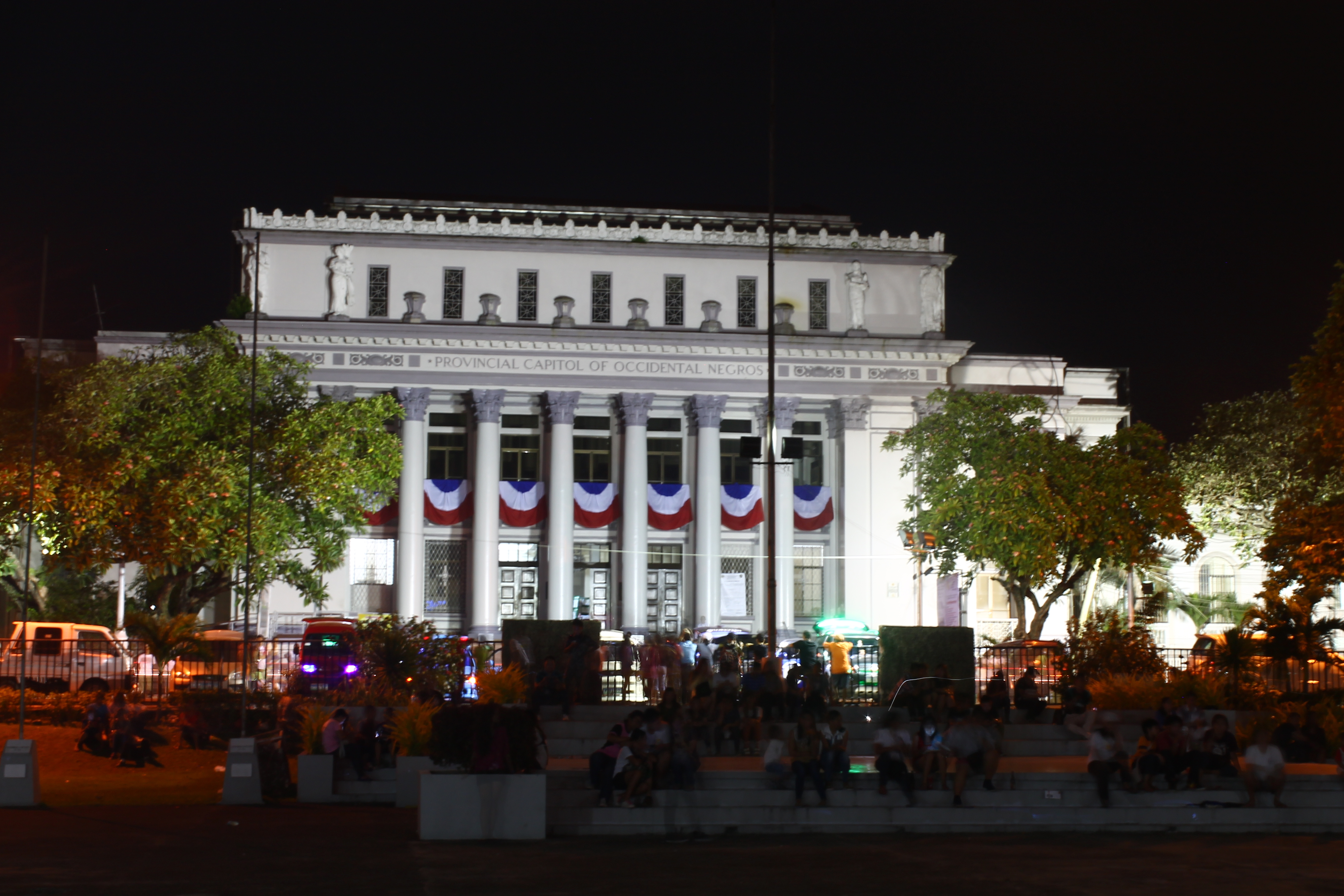
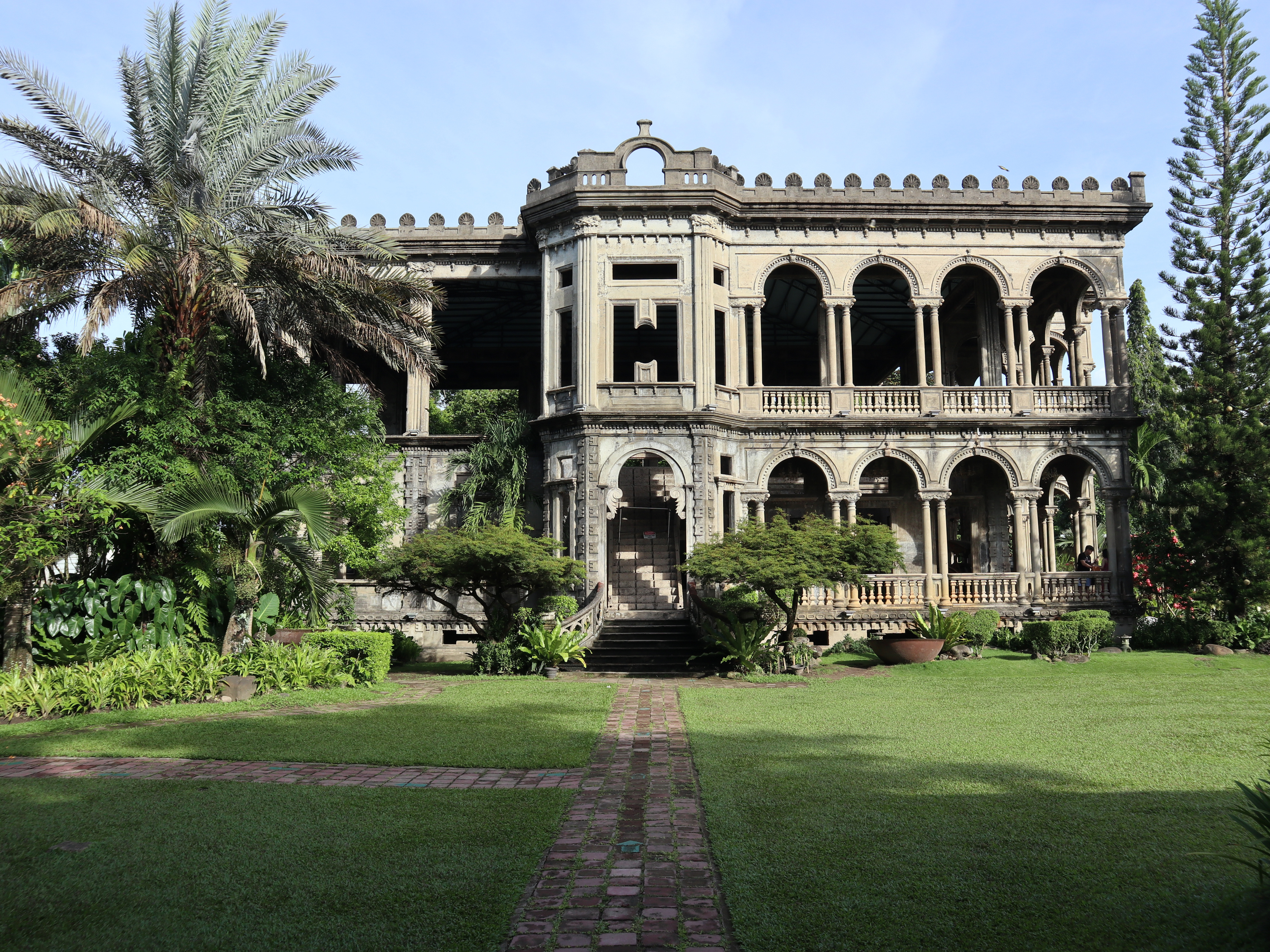
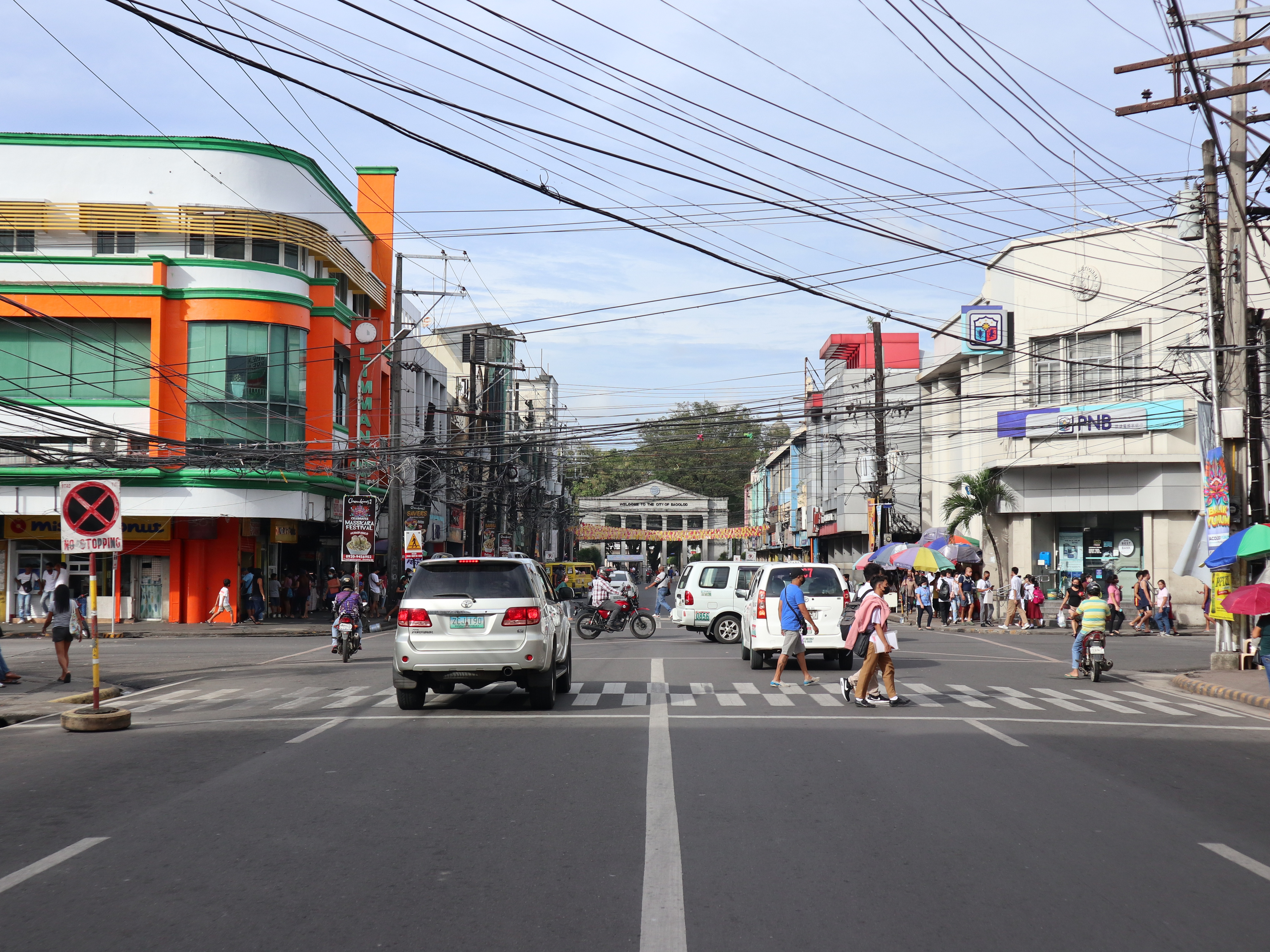
- (from top: left to right) Mount Kanlaon; Magikland in Silay; Negros Occidental Provincial Capitol in Bacolod; Ruins of Lacson Mansion in Talisay; Downtown Bacolod

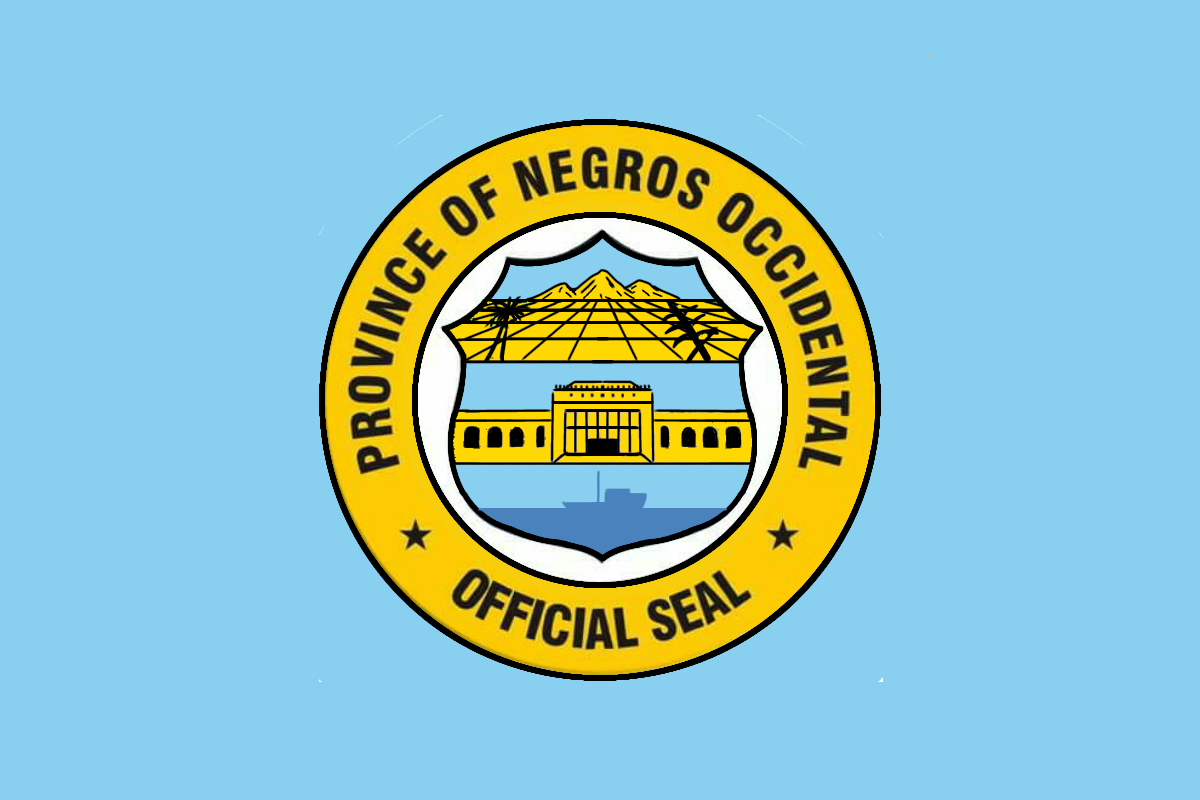
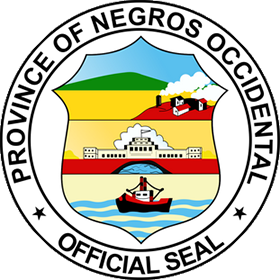
- Flag Seal
- Nicknames: Sugarbowl of the Philippines; The Land of Sweet Surprises
- Motto: "Abanse Negrense"
- Anthem: Matuod nga Negrosanon (literally: True Negrense)
- Location in the Philippines
- Interactive map of Negros Occidental
- Coordinates: 10°25′N 123°00′E
- Country: Philippines
- Region: Negros Island Region
- Founded: January 1, 1890
- Capital and largest city: Bacolod*

Government
  - Type: Sangguniang Panlalawigan
  - Governor: Eugenio Jose V. Lacson (NPC)
  - Vice Governor: Jose Benito A. Alonso (NUP)
  - Legislature: Negros Occidental Provincial Board
  - Electorate: 2,001,732 voters (2025)

Area
  - Total: 7,802.54 km^{2} (3,012.58 sq mi)
  - Rank: 8th out of 82
- (excluding Bacolod)
- Highest elevation (Mount Kanlaon): 2,465 m (8,087 ft)

Population (2024 census)
  - Total: 2,680,477
  - Rank: 8th out of 82
  - Density: 343.539/km^{2} (889.762/sq mi)
  - Rank: 22nd out of 82
  - Households: 637,967
- (excluding Bacolod)

Divisions
  - Independent cities: 1: Bacolod*
  - Component cities: 12: Bago; Cadiz; Escalante; Himamaylan; Kabankalan; La Carlota; Sagay; San Carlos; Silay; Sipalay; Talisay; Victorias
  - Municipalities: 19: Binalbagan; Calatrava; Candoni; Cauayan; Don Salvador Benedicto; Enrique B. Magalona; Hinigaran; Hinoba-an; Ilog; Isabela; La Castellana; Manapla; Moises Padilla; Murcia; Pontevedra; Pulupandan; San Enrique; Toboso; Valladolid
  - Barangays: 601; including independent cities: 662
  - Districts: Legislative districts of Negros Occidental; Legislative district of Bacolod

Economy
  - Income class: 1st provincial income class
  - Poverty incidence: 22.1% (2023)
  - Revenue: ₱ 6,941 million (2024)
  - Assets: ₱ 22,155 million (2024)
  - Expenditure: ₱ 6,188 million (2024)
  - Liabilities: ₱ 7,920 million (2024)
- Time zone: UTC+8 (PST)
- PSGC: 0604500000
- IDD : area code: +63 (0)34
- ISO 3166 code: PH-NEC
- Spoken languages: Hiligaynon; Cebuano; Karulan; Magahat; Tagalog; English
- Website: www.negros-occ.gov.ph
- * Bacolod is a highly-urbanized city, politically independent from Negros Occidental.

Negros Occidental (Western Negros; Hiligaynon: Nakatungdang Negros; Tagalog: Kanlurang Negros), officially the Province of Negros Occidental (Hiligaynon: Kapuoran sang Nakatungdang Negros; Tagalog: Lalawigan ng Kanlurang Negros), is a province located in the western part of Negros Island in the Philippines. The provincial capital is Bacolod, a highly urbanized city and largest city by population. While geographically situated within the province and classified as part of it by the Philippine Statistics Authority, is administratively independent from the provincial government. Bacolod also serves as one of the two designated regional centers of the Negros Island Region, the other being Dumaguete in Negros Oriental.

Negros Occidental occupies the northwestern portion of the island, sharing a land border with Negros Oriental to the southeast. The province is renowned for its significant contribution to the national sugar industry, earning it the moniker "Sugarbowl of the Philippines" due to its production of more than half of the country's total sugar output.

Negros Occidental faces the island province of Guimaras and the province of Iloilo on Panay Island to the northwest, across the Panay Gulf and the Guimaras Strait. The primary language spoken throughout the province is Hiligaynon (also referred to as Ilonggo), while the predominant religious affiliation is Roman Catholicism, reflecting the historical influence of Spanish colonization.

The provincial capital and largest city by population is Bacolod, which serves as the administrative center of the province. However, it is classified as a highly urbanized city, rendering it administratively independent from the provincial government.

According to the 2020 Philippine Census, Negros Occidental has a population of 2,623,172 inhabitants, making it the most populous province in the Negros Island Region, the second most populous in the Visayas (following Cebu), and the 8th most populous province in the Philippines. It also holds the distinction of having the highest number of chartered cities of any Philippine province, with a total of thirteen.

== History ==
=== Spanish colonial era ===
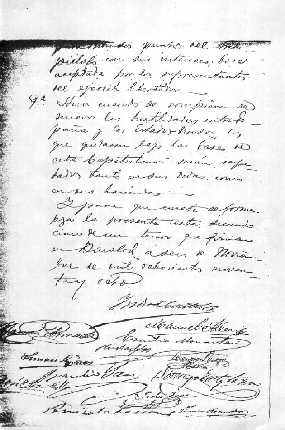
Last page of the Acta de Capitulación (English: Surrender Document).

The island of Negros was originally referred to by its native inhabitants as Buglas, a term in old Hiligaynon believed to mean "cut off", possibly referencing its geographic separation from the main islands. When Spanish explorers arrived in April 1565, they named the island "Negros" due to the dark-skinned Ati natives they encountered.

Among the earliest known native settlements were those in what are now the towns of Binalbagan and Ilog, which were officially established as towns in 1572 and 1584, respectively. Other notable pre-colonial and early colonial settlements included Hinigaran, Bago, Marayo (present-day Pontevedra), Mamalan (now Himamaylan), and Candaguit (now a sitio of San Enrique).

In 1743, Ilog was designated as the first capital of the province. By 1818, Negros Occidental was the residence of several Spanish-Filipino families, with 37 Spanish-Filipino families living in Bacolod, 25 Spanish-Filipino families in Silay and another 25 in the capital at Ilog. The seat of government was later moved to Himamaylan before being permanently transferred to Bacolod in 1849. In 1890, the island of Negros was administratively divided into two provinces—Negros Occidental in the west and Negros Oriental in the east.

Following the end of Spanish colonial rule, the two provinces were briefly unified as an independent revolutionary government known as the Cantonal Republic of Negros on November 27, 1898, with Bacolod serving as its capital.

=== American colonial era ===
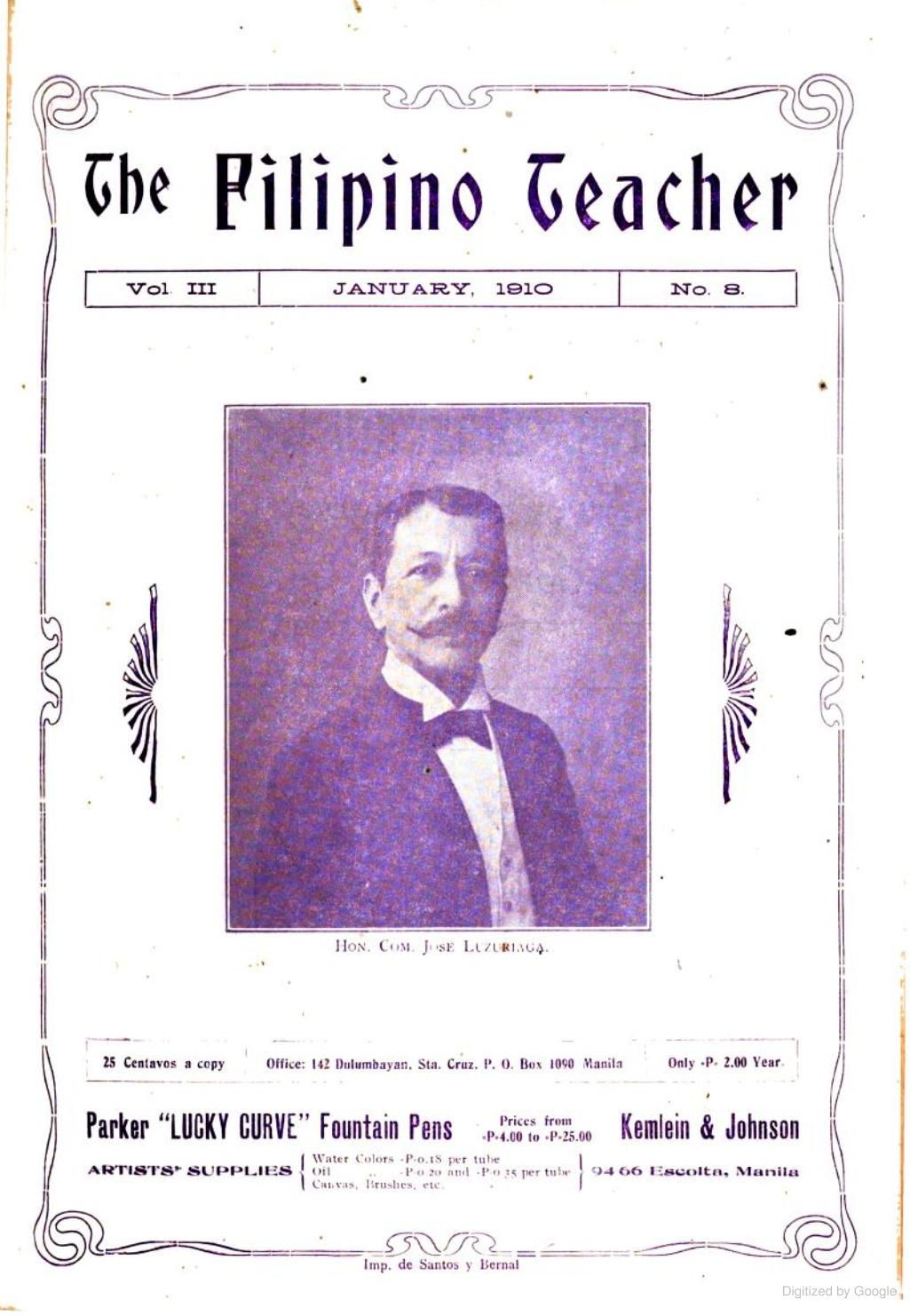
José de Luzuriaga, the second Governor of Negros Occidental, succeeding Melecio Severino

The Cantonal Republic of Negros became a protectorate of the United States following the end of Spanish rule, until its dissolution in 1901. Thereafter, the provinces of Negros Occidental and Negros Oriental were formally annexed into the newly organized civil government of the Philippines under American administration. From 1901 through the 1930s, both provinces were governed under the Insular Government of the United States, and later under the Commonwealth of the Philippines beginning in 1935.

During this period, the economy of Negros Occidental experienced sustained growth, largely due to the integration of Philippine sugar into the United States market. From the 1950s to the late 1980s, the province remained heavily reliant on the sugar industry, which dominated its socio-economic landscape.

Between 1914 and 1927, western Negros saw the establishment of numerous settlements, many of which eventually developed into towns and cities. These communities were connected by a network of railways constructed to transport sugarcane to major processing centers known as "sugar centrals." These centrals were surrounded by vast agricultural estates or haciendas that cultivated sugarcane on the island's fertile volcanic soil. Prominent towns and cities associated with this growth included Ilog, Hinigaran, La Carlota, Silay, Pulupandan, Bacolod, San Carlos, and Bais.

This period also marked a wave of mass migration from Panay Island. To supply labor for the sugar industry; Spanish, Chinese, and French plus other mestizo managers imported agricultural workers from Panay, leading to the demographic displacement of the native Cebuano-speaking population in parts of Negros.

Negros Occidental also became a significant destination for Spanish immigrants during the American colonial period, particularly those originating from the Basque Country and Catalonia regions of Spain. Many of these settlers engaged in commercial enterprises and agricultural development, contributing to the province's economic growth through involvement in the sugar industry and related businesses.

=== Japanese occupation ===
During the Second World War, both Negros Occidental and Negros Oriental were invaded and occupied by Imperial Japanese forces. In response to the invasion, many residents of the island sought refuge in the inland mountain regions to escape Japanese control.

The liberation of Negros Island occurred on August 6, 1945, when combined Filipino and American forces, supported by local Negrense guerrilla units, launched coordinated offensives against the Japanese occupiers. The guerrilla resistance had been active throughout the occupation, conducting sabotage and intelligence operations in support of the Allied effort.

The military infrastructure during the war included several divisions and regiments formed under the Philippine Commonwealth Army and the Philippine Constabulary. These included the 7th, 73rd, 74th, and 75th Infantry Divisions (active from January 3, 1942, to June 30, 1946), and the 7th Constabulary Regiment (active from October 28, 1944, to June 30, 1946), headquartered in Negros Occidental. These units were integral to the anti-Japanese resistance, organizing and executing operations against Imperial Japanese forces across the island between 1942 and 1945.

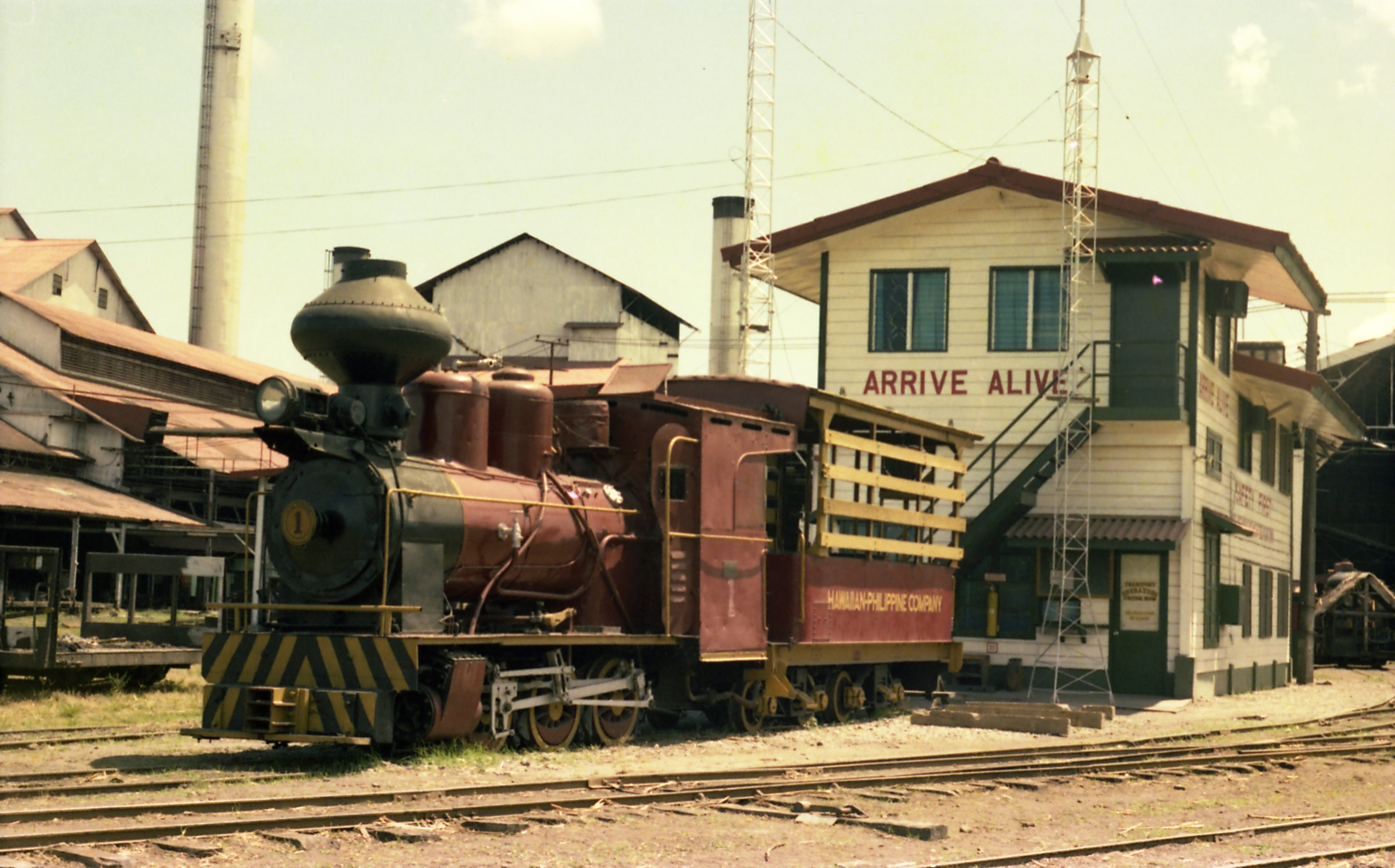
Hawaiian-Philippine Company Locomotive No. 1, photographed in 1984. The Hawaiian-Philippine Company is one of the oldest sugar centrals in Negros Occidental and remains operational. It is the only mill in the Philippines still transporting sugarcane using a steam locomotive.

=== Philippine independence ===
==== Martial law era ====
The beginning months of the 1970s had marked a period of turmoil and change in the Philippines, as well as in Negros Occidental. During his bid to be the first Philippine president to be re-elected for a second term, Ferdinand Marcos launched an unprecedented number of foreign debt-funded public works projects. This caused the Philippine economy to take a sudden downwards turn known as the 1969 Philippine balance of payments crisis, which led to a period of economic difficulty and a significant rise of social unrest. With only a year left in his last constitutionally allowed term as president, Ferdinand Marcos placed the Philippines under Martial Law in September 1972 and thus retained the position for fourteen more years. This period in Philippine history is remembered for the Marcos administration's record of human rights abuses, particularly targeting political opponents, student activists, journalists, religious workers, farmers, and others who fought against the Marcos dictatorship. Notable events during this period include the 1982 Maricalum mining disaster, the 1984 Negros famine, and the 1985 Escalante massacre.

==== Maricalum mining disaster (1982) ====
In 1982, Tailings Pond No. 3 of the Marinduque Mining and Industrial Corporation (MMIC), the predecessor of the Maricalum Mining Corporation (MMC), collapsed due to a weak foundation, releasing an estimated 27 million metric tons of copper mine tailings. The spill directly affected farmers in the surrounding area, destroying agricultural lands and rendering them unproductive.

The incident led to court cases filed by affected farmers, but the outcomes did not favor them. The local government subsequently used its influence to convert the affected land into government land and completed its sale to the mining company, thereby avoiding further compensation claims from displaced farmers.

The 1982 collapse was part of a broader pattern of tailings dam failures at the Maricalum site. Between 1982 and 1996, the company's tailings ponds collapsed or overflowed four times, damaging more than 1,000 hectares of agricultural land planted to rice, corn, and vegetables, and displacing over 1,200 peasant and fisherfolk families in Barangays Baclao, Tao-angan, and Gil Montilla in the towns of Sipalay and Cauayan.

A subsequent tailings dam overflow occurred on November 1, 1996, when typhoon rains caused the mine's tailings dams to overflow, spilling tailings onto 500 hectares of rice fields and affecting hundreds of families.

==== The Negros Famine (1984) ====
By the time Ferdinand Marcos' second term began, sugar had become a critical Philippine export, responsible for 27% of the county's total dollar earnings. With international sugar prices rising rapidly through the early 1970s, Marcos decided to put domestic and international sugar trading under government control, first through the Philippine Exchange Co. (Philex), and later through the Philippine Sugar Commission (PHILSUCOM ) and its trading arm, the National Sugar Trading Corporation (NASUTRA), which were both controlled by Marcos crony Roberto Benedicto.

However, the international price of sugar eventually crashed. Quality of life and sugar production were intertwined, so lower production meant lower quality of life for thousands that relied on the industry for sustenance and financial stability. The NASUTRA monopoly forced many sugar planters into bankruptcy or deep in debt. In 1984, over 190,000 sugar workers lost their livelihood, and about a million sacadas and their families in Negros suffered in what would later become known as the "Negros Famine." The percentage of malnourished infants eventually went up to as high as 78%. Negros Occidental's problem with malnourished infants gained global prominence among the press in 1985, as they ran covers in both, local and international newspapers.

==== The Escalante Massacre (1985) ====
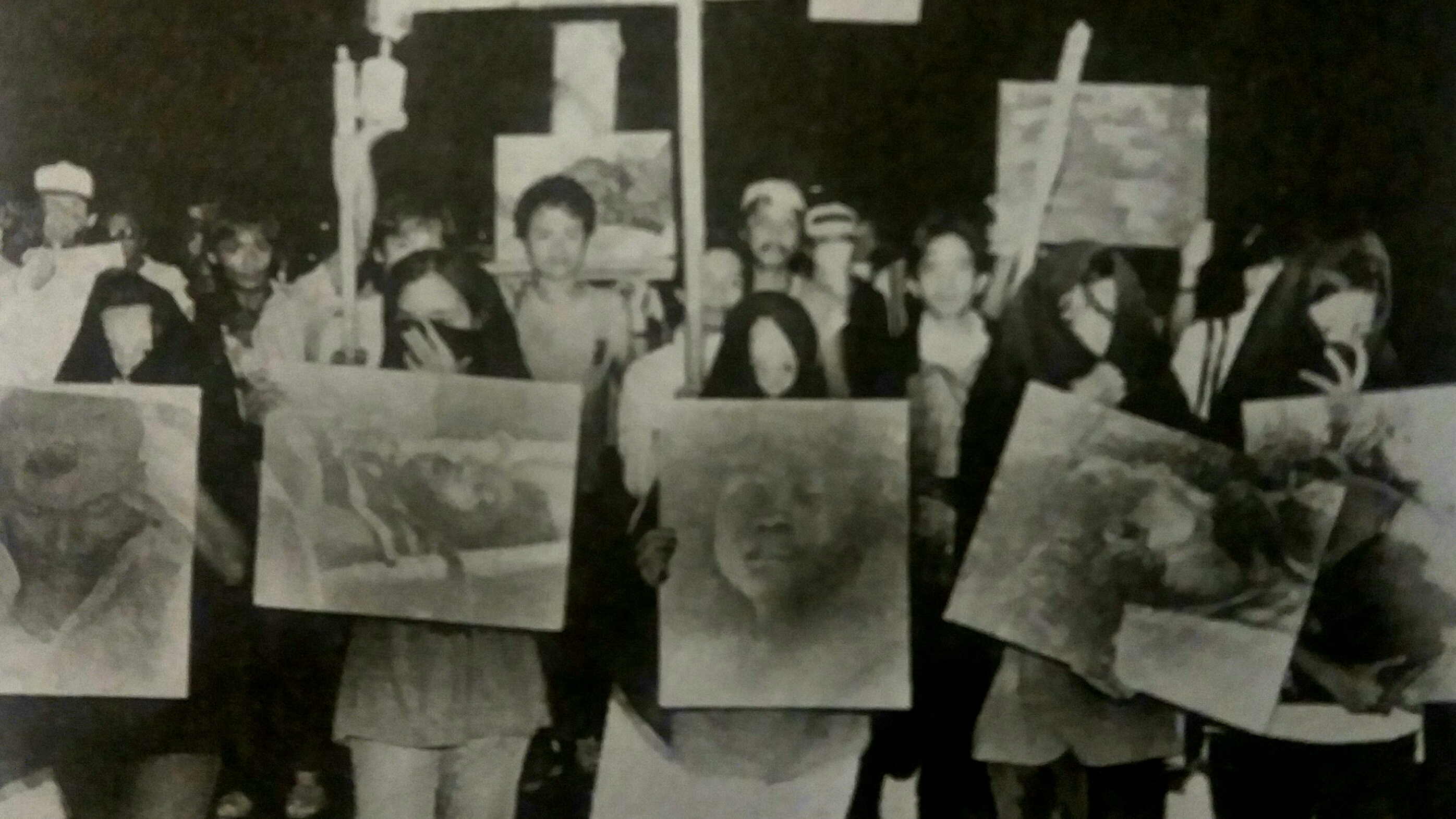
A rally in 1986 against the Marcos Dictatorship in which protesters hold images of the victims of Escalante Massacre

One of the infamous incidents of the Marcos dictatorship era was the September 20, 1985 Escalante massacre, in which government paramilitary forces gunned down peasant protesters engaged in a rally in commemoration of the 13th anniversary of the declaration of martial law.

==== Creation and abolition of Negros del Norte ====
Negros del Norte was created from Negros Occidental on January 3, 1986, but its creation was declared unconstitutional on July 11, 1986, and was immediately abolished on August 18, 1986.

==== Post-EDSA Revolution ====
Towards the end of 1987, after the successful overthrow of the Marcos regime, the overall economic situation started to show a positive upturn. The campaign for agricultural diversification had been gaining momentum, paving the way for more landowners to invest in prawn and fish farming, seafood catching, raising of livestock and high-value organic produce such as fruits and vegetables, as well as other cash crops. Investments' upswing became apparent by 1988. The participation of the industrial sector accelerated consumer-led economic growth and development manifested with the increase in sales of consumer goods and by-products. Today, Negros Occidental remains one of the most progressive and largely developed Philippine provinces, in large part due to profits from the sugar industry, but also due to economic diversification in other fields. Due to the vast population of Negros Occidental, it became the province with the most number of cities outside of the National Capital Region.

=== Contemporary ===
On May 29, 2015, the Negros Island Region was formed when Negros Occidental and its capital were separated from Western Visayas and transferred to the new region along with Negros Oriental, when President Benigno Aquino III signed Executive Order No. 183, s. 2015. But it was abolished on August 9, 2017, when President Rodrigo Duterte revoked Executive Order No. 183, s. 2015 through the signage of Executive Order No. 38, citing the reason of the lack of funds to fully establish the NIR according to Benjamin Diokno, the Secretary of Budget and Management, reverting Negros Occidental and its capital back into Western Visayas. However, with the Philippines' current presidential administration promoting federalism, the idea of the twin provinces of Negros Occidental and Negros Oriental reunified into one federal state/region is already in the talks of local provincial politicians, with additional support from the native Negrenses. There is also a suggestion, jointly approved by the provincial governors, that Negros Occidental along with Negros Oriental, be renamed with their pre-colonial names as "Buglas Nakatundan" and "Buglas Sidlakan" respectively, with Negros, as a federal state, be named as "Negrosanon Federated Region", due to the Negro associated with the name "Negros".

== Geography ==
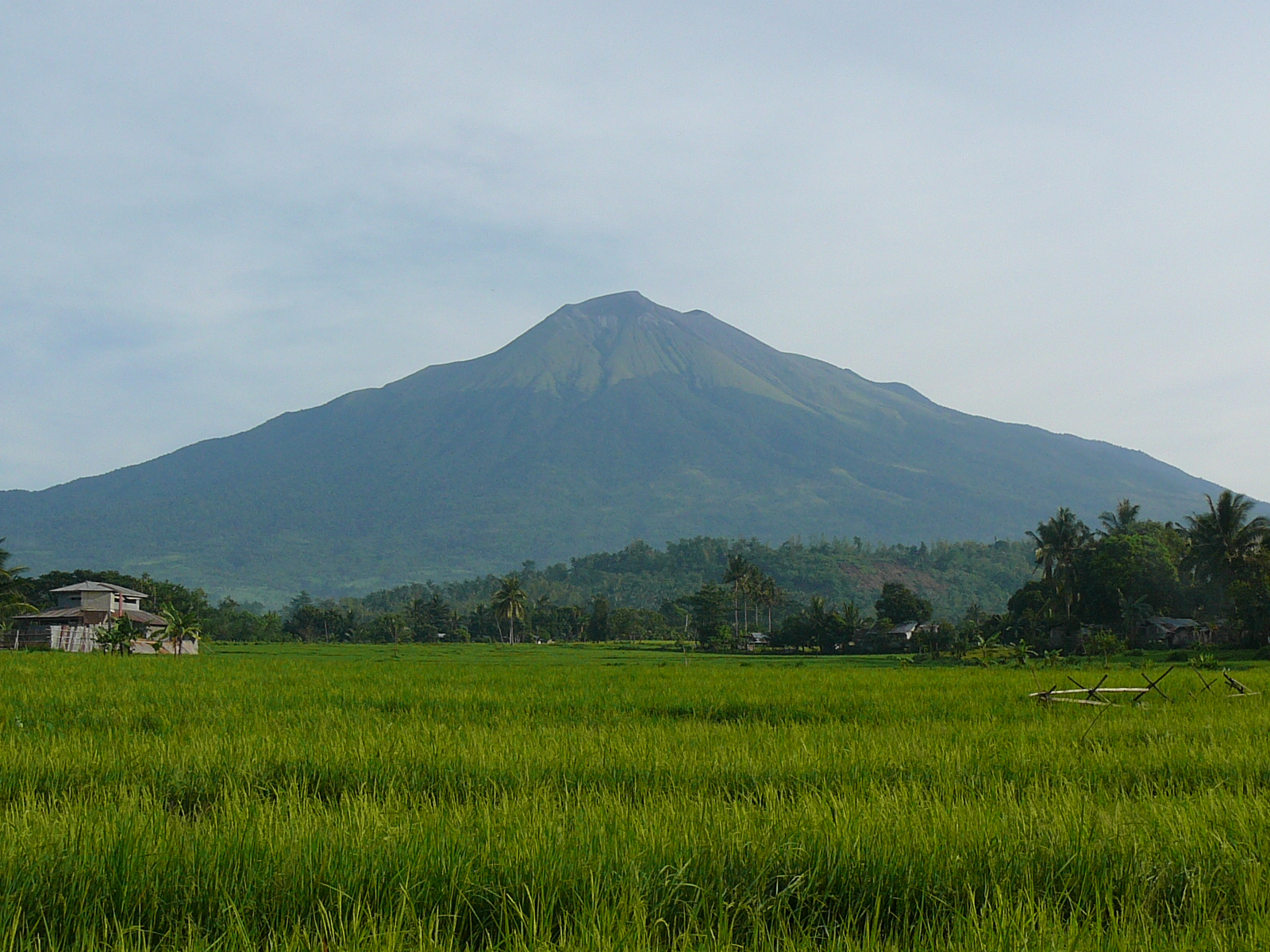
Mount Kanlaon, highest peak in Negros Occidental and of the entire Visayas

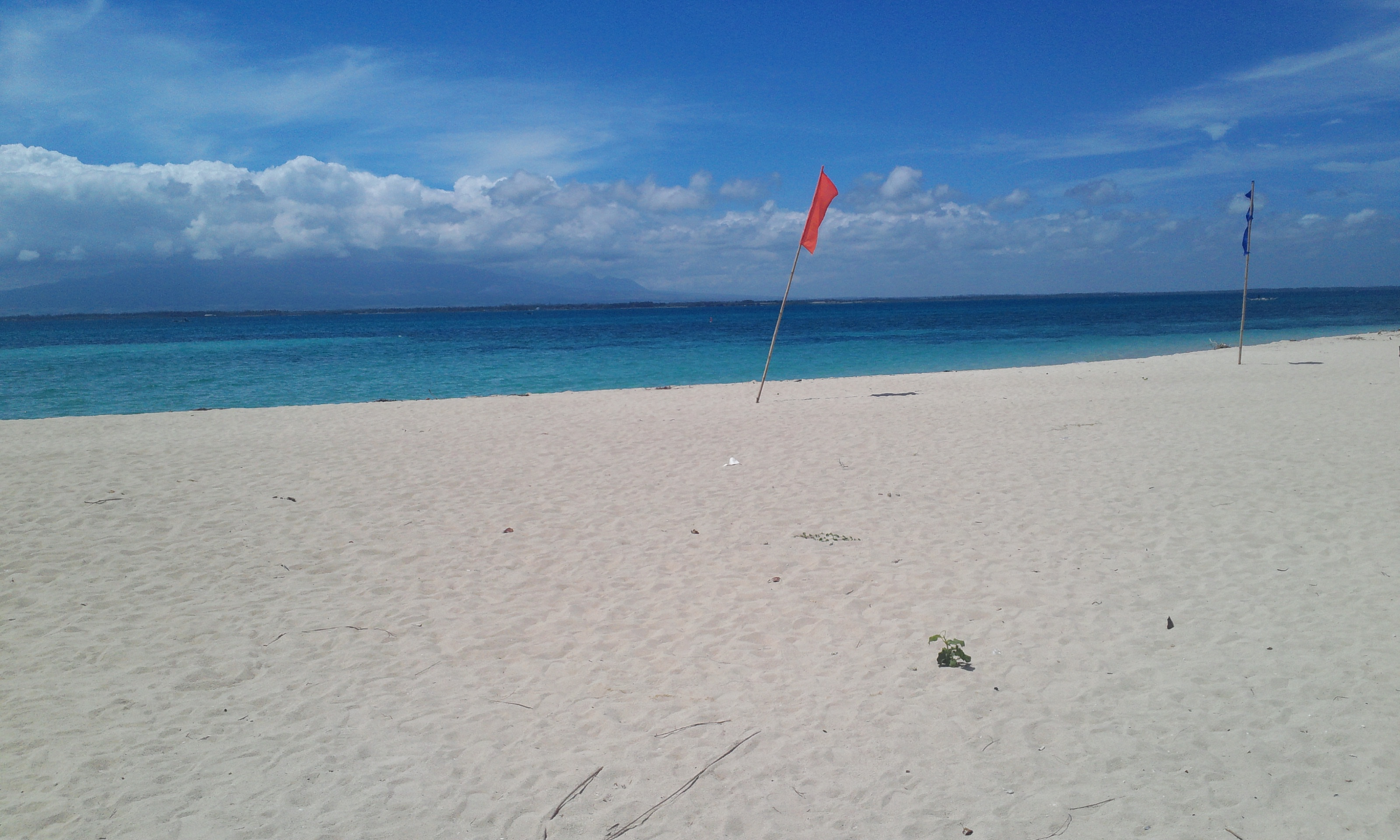
Lakawon Island

Negros Occidental is located on the western side of Negros Island, the fourth largest island in the Philippines, with a total land area of 7,802.54 square kilometres (3,012.58 sq mi). If Bacolod is included for geographical purposes, the province has an area of 7,965.21 square kilometres (3,075.38 sq mi). The province is approximately 375 kilometres (233 mi) long from north to south. The Visayan Sea bounds it in the north, Panay Gulf on the west, the Tañon Strait on the east, the province of Negros Oriental on the southeast, and Sulu Sea on the southwest.

Much of Negros Occidental is composed of plains and gentle slopes, the former of which dominate the northern and central parts of the province. Since the whole island is volcanic, its soil is ideal for agriculture. Eighty percent of all arable land in the island region is cultivated. Beaches also dot its coastal areas, such as those located in Sipalay, the Sipaway Island in San Carlos, and the Lakawon Island in Cadiz. In contrast, the southwestern section of the province is more mountainous and hilly; some are situated at least 100 meters above sea level. The mountain range in the southeastern part of the province serves as its basis of boundary with Negros Oriental. Kanlaon volcano is the province's highest peak (sharing it with Negros Oriental), as well as of the entire Visayas region, rising to a height of 2,465 meters (8,087 ft) above sea level. Mount Mandalagan is the province's second highest mountain (as well as the highest mountain located wholly in the province), being situated 1,885 metres (6,184 ft) above mean sea level.

Slopes and areas close to Mandalagan are heavily forested. The Northern Negros Natural Park is a forest reserve located in these areas. Initially established as a forest reserve in 1935, it was converted into a natural park in 2005. Numerous diverse arrays of fauna and flora, some of which are endemic to its forests, dominate the entire park.

=== Climate ===
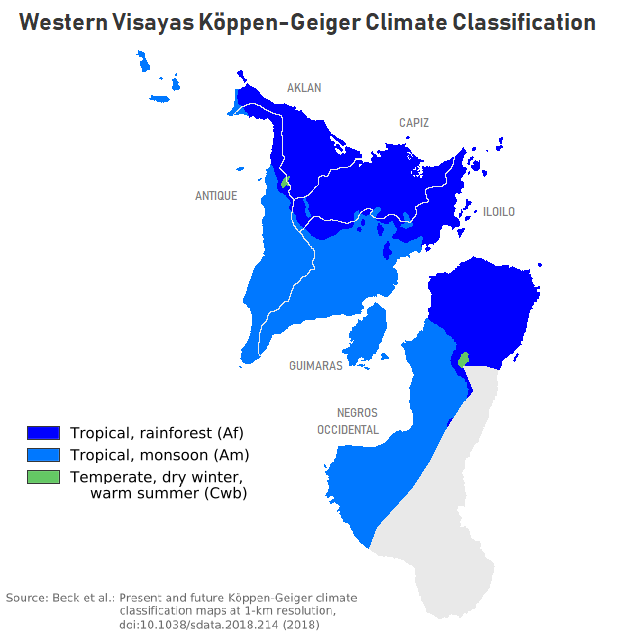
Climate of Western Visayas (prior to the re-establishment of Negros Island Region). Negros Occidental can be seen at the right.

Negros Occidental has a tropical climate due to the fact that it is situated close to the equator, being located at least nine degrees north of it. The northern section of the province has a tropical rainforest (Köppen: Af) climate, whereas the southern portion has a tropical monsoon (Köppen: Am) climate. Mount Kanlaon itself, along with its higher-elevated slopes, are classified as having a dry-winter subtropical highland climate (Köppen: Cwb) due to their higher elevations, allowing for a significantly cooler temperature compared to the province as a whole.

Under the Coronas climate classification, Negros Occidental is situated under the Type III climate. This means that the province has a relatively short dry season from November to April, while remaining wet for the rest of the year. Occasionally, the southwestern section is classified as a Type I climate, with more pronounced wet and dry seasons.

While most of the province has temperatures expected for a tropical climate, some places are cooler, particularly the localities located close to Mandalagan, Kanlaon, and the mountain range near its border. More specifically, the towns of Don Salvador Benedicto and Candoni boast average temperatures somewhat lower compared to those situated at the coast.

=== Administrative divisions ===
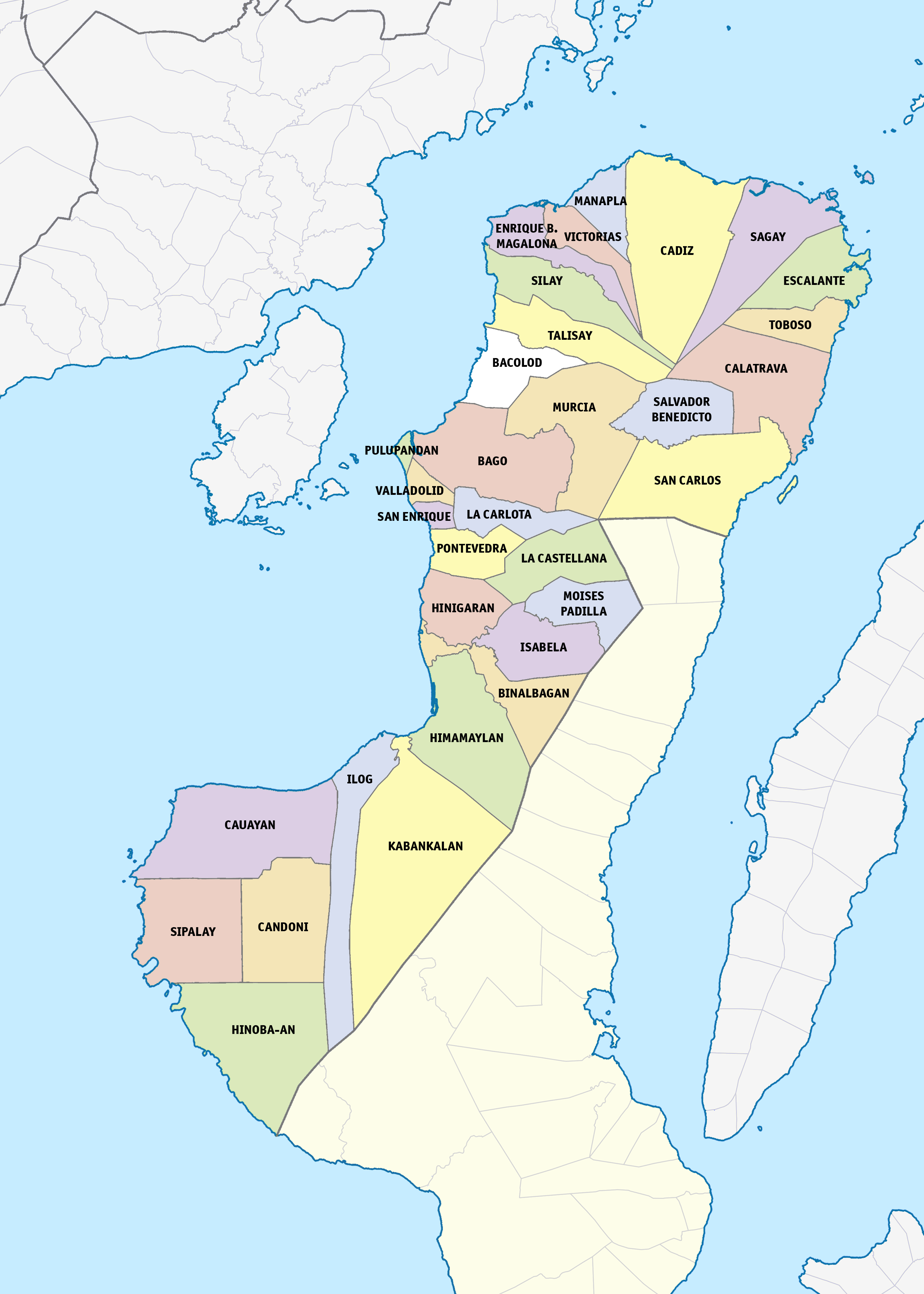
Political map of Negros Occidental

Negros Occidental comprises 19 municipalities and 13 cities (one highly-urbanized and twelve components), further subdivided into 662 barangays. It has the most chartered cities among all the provinces in the Philippines. Although Bacolod serves as the capital, it is governed independently from the province as a highly urbanized city.

- † Provincial capital and highly urbanized city
- ∗ Component city
- Municipality

City or municipality		District	Population			±% p.a.	Area		Density		Barangay	Coordinates^{[A]}
			(2020)		(2015)		km^{2}	sq mi	/km^{2}	/sq mi		
Bacolod	†	Lone	—	600,783	561,875	+1.28%	160.71	62.05	3,700	9,600	61	10°40′34″N 122°57′05″E
Bago	∗	4th	7.3%	191,210	170,981	+2.15%	371.80	143.55	510	1,300	24	10°32′20″N 122°50′12″E
Binalbagan		5th	2.7%	71,407	67,270	+1.14%	189.96	73.34	380	980	16	10°11′48″N 122°51′56″E
Cadiz	∗	2nd	6.0%	158,544	154,723	+0.47%	524.57	202.54	300	780	22	10°57′16″N 123°18′21″E
Calatrava		1st	3.1%	82,540	80,624	+0.45%	504.50	194.79	160	410	40	10°35′38″N 123°28′35″E
Candoni		6th	0.9%	23,751	21,789	+1.66%	220.95	85.31	110	280	9	9°49′40″N 122°38′32″E
Cauayan		6th	4.1%	108,480	102,165	+1.15%	520.00	200.77	210	540	25	9°58′21″N 122°37′27″E
Don Salvador Benedicto		1st	1.0%	26,922	25,662	+0.92%	170.56	65.85	160	410	7	10°34′38″N 123°13′14″E
Enrique B. Magalona		3rd	2.5%	64,290	62,921	+0.41%	113.25	43.73	570	1,500	23	10°52′37″N 122°58′53″E
Escalante	∗	1st	3.7%	96,159	94,070	+0.42%	192.76	74.43	500	1,300	21	10°50′28″N 123°29′57″E
Himamaylan	∗	5th	4.4%	116,240	106,880	+1.61%	367.04	141.71	320	830	19	10°06′00″N 122°52′12″E
Hinigaran		5th	3.4%	88,909	85,602	+0.72%	154.92	59.81	570	1,500	24	10°16′27″N 122°51′07″E
Hinoba-an		6th	2.3%	60,865	56,819	+1.32%	414.50	160.04	150	390	13	9°36′05″N 122°28′10″E
Ilog		6th	2.3%	59,855	57,389	+0.80%	322.10	124.36	190	490	15	10°01′26″N 122°46′05″E
Isabela		5th	2.5%	64,516	62,146	+0.72%	178.76	69.02	360	930	30	10°12′13″N 122°59′17″E
Kabankalan	∗	6th	7.6%	200,198	181,977	+1.83%	699.27	269.99	290	750	32	9°59′25″N 122°48′59″E
La Carlota	∗	4th	2.5%	66,664	64,469	+0.64%	137.29	53.01	490	1,300	14	10°25′31″N 122°55′21″E
La Castellana		5th	3.0%	79,492	74,855	+1.15%	185.22	71.51	430	1,100	13	10°19′23″N 123°01′07″E
Manapla		2nd	2.1%	55,083	54,845	+0.08%	112.86	43.58	490	1,300	12	10°57′21″N 123°07′26″E
Moises Padilla		5th	1.7%	43,462	41,386	+0.94%	144.10	55.64	300	780	15	10°16′13″N 123°04′26″E
Murcia		3rd	3.4%	88,868	81,286	+1.71%	279.14	107.78	320	830	23	10°36′24″N 123°02′25″E
Pontevedra		4th	2.1%	54,502	51,866	+0.95%	110.95	42.84	490	1,300	20	10°22′04″N 122°52′13″E
Pulupandan		4th	1.1%	30,117	27,735	+1.58%	18.49	7.14	1,600	4,100	20	10°31′08″N 122°48′12″E
Sagay	∗	2nd	5.7%	148,894	146,264	+0.34%	330.34	127.54	450	1,200	25	10°53′46″N 123°24′55″E
San Carlos	∗	1st	5.1%	132,650	132,536	+0.02%	451.50	174.33	290	750	18	10°28′57″N 123°25′06″E
San Enrique		4th	0.9%	24,177	23,907	+0.21%	28.84	11.14	840	2,200	10	10°24′44″N 122°51′17″E
Silay	∗	3rd	5.0%	130,478	126,930	+0.53%	220.21	85.02	590	1,500	16	10°47′52″N 122°58′23″E
Sipalay	∗	6th	2.8%	72,448	70,070	+0.64%	379.78	146.63	190	490	17	9°45′00″N 122°24′07″E
Talisay	∗	3rd	4.2%	108,909	102,214	+1.22%	201.18	77.68	540	1,400	27	10°44′14″N 122°58′02″E
Toboso		1st	1.7%	43,445	42,114	+0.59%	117.33	45.30	370	960	9	10°42′56″N 123°31′02″E
Valladolid		4th	1.5%	39,996	37,833	+1.06%	48.03	18.54	830	2,100	16	10°27′41″N 122°49′27″E
Victorias	∗	3rd	3.4%	90,101	87,933	+0.46%	133.92	51.71	670	1,700	26	10°53′46″N 123°04′21″E
Total^{[B]}				2,623,172	2,497,261	+0.94%	7,844.12	3,028.63	330	850	601	(see GeoGroup box)
1. Coordinates mark the city/town center, and are sortable by latitude.; 2. Total figures exclude the highly urbanized city of Bacolod.

== Demographics ==
Population census of Negros Occidental

Year	Pop.	±% p.a.
1903	308,272	—
1918	396,636	+1.69%
1939	824,858	+3.55%
1948	1,038,758	+2.59%
1960	1,332,323	+2.10%
1970	1,316,482	−0.12%
1975	1,562,400	+3.49%
1980	1,667,886	+1.31%

Year	Pop.	±% p.a.
1990	1,892,728	+1.27%
1995	2,031,841	+1.34%
2000	2,136,647	+1.08%
2007	2,370,269	+1.44%
2010	2,396,039	+0.39%
2015	2,497,261	+0.79%
2020	2,623,172	+1.04%
2024	2,680,477	+0.52%

(excluding Bacolod)
Source: Philippine Statistics Authority

Languages Spoken (2000)
Language	Speakers
Hiligaynon	1,958,294
Cebuano	181,452
Other Visayan languages	8,082
Kinaray-a	5,150
Others	12,073
Not Reported	18,234

The population of Negros Occidental in the 2024 census was 2,680,477 people, with a density of 340 inhabitants per square kilometre or 880 inhabitants per square mile. If Bacolod is included for geographical and statistical purposes, the total population is 3,223,955 people, with a density of 384/km^{2} (995/sq mi).

Negros Occidental is the second most-populous province in the Visayas after Cebu, having the second largest number of congressional districts and the 7th most-populous (4th if highly urbanized cities and independent component cities are included in the population of corresponding provinces) in the Philippines based on the 2015 Census. As of 2010, the population of registered voters was 1,478,260.

Residents of Negros are called "Negrenses" (and less often "Negrosanons") and many are of either pure or mixed Austronesian heritage, with foreign ancestry (i.e. Chinese and/or Spanish) as minorities.

=== Languages ===
Negros Occidental is predominantly a Hiligaynon-speaking province with 84% of residents speaking it as a first language, because of its linguistic ties with Iloilo. Cebuano is spoken by the remaining 16%, especially in the cities and towns facing the Tañon Strait, due to their proximity to the island-province of Cebu, and the province's eastern parts that border Negros Oriental. A mixture of Hiligaynon and Cebuano is spoken in Sagay and surrounding places, which both face Iloilo and Cebu. Filipino and English are widely spoken and used on both sides of the island for educational, literary and official purposes.

=== Religion ===
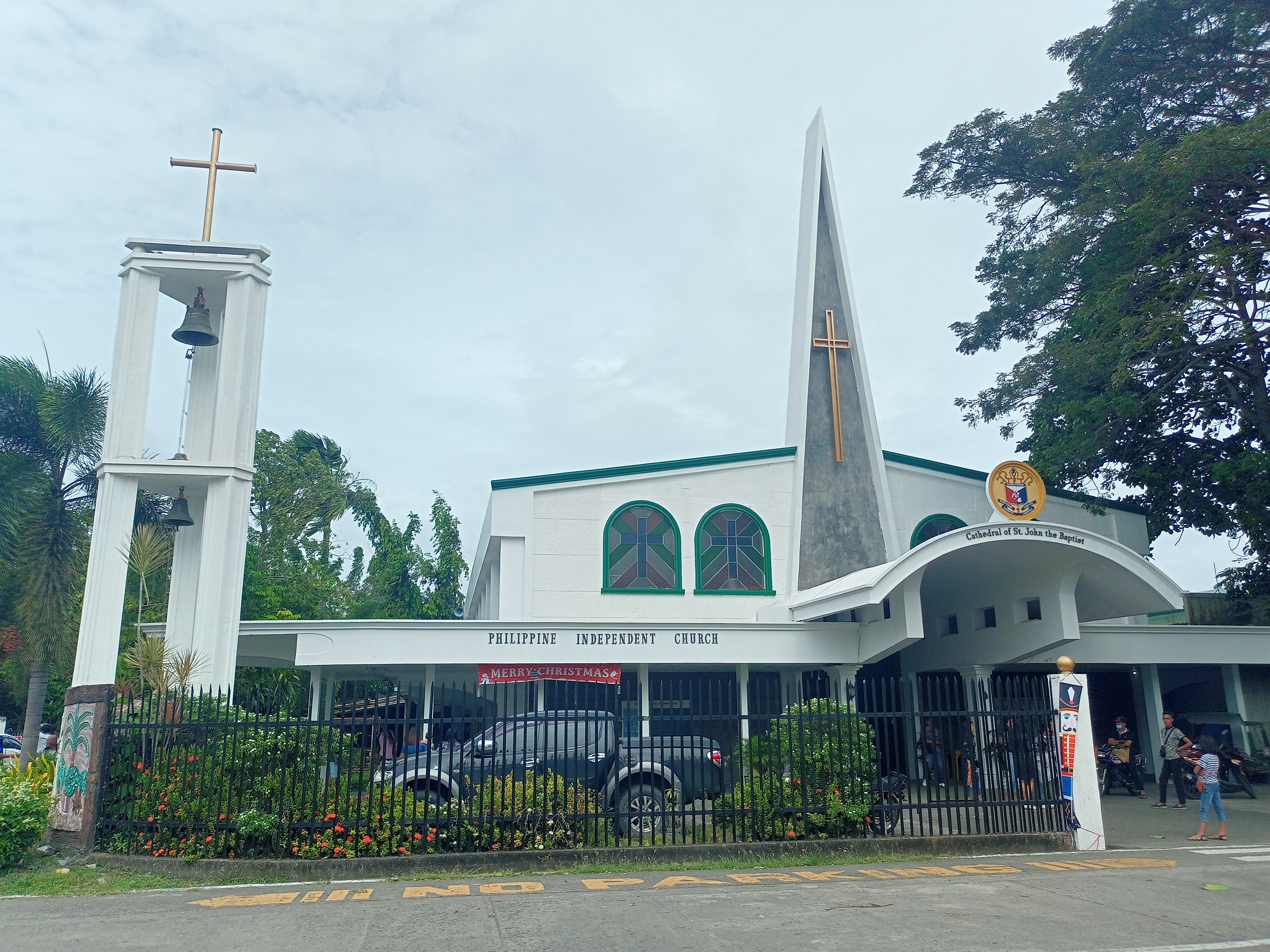
The Cathedral of St. John the Baptist of the Philippine Independent Church (Aglipayan)

Catholicism is the predominant religion, with over 2 million adherents. Negros Occidental falls under the jurisdictions of the Roman Catholic Dioceses of Bacolod, San Carlos & Kabankalan. Other major Christian denominations include Baptist churches, Aglipayan Church, Iglesia ni Cristo has 3 districts supervision has 3-4% adherents, Seventh-day Adventist Church, and Evangelicalism. Islam is practised by a minority, with 1,842 claiming it as their religion.

== Economy ==
Poverty incidence of Negros Occidental (%)

Source: Philippine Statistics Authority

Negros Occidental posted a GDP of ₱ 277.19 Billion for the year 2024, the second largest provincial economy in the Visayas after Cebu province.

Negros Occidental is Known as the "Sugarbowl of the Philippines", the sugar industry is the lifeblood of the economy of Negros Occidental, producing more than half of the country's sugar. There are 15 sugar centrals located throughout the lowland areas the north and west of the island, stretching from northwest along the coasts of the Visayan Sea and Guimaras Strait. Among the larger mills are in San Carlos, La Carlota, Bago, Binalbagan, Kabankalan, Sagay, Silay, Murcia and Victorias. Victorias Mill in Victorias City is the largest sugar mill in the country, and the world's largest integrated sugar mill and refinery. Sugar is transported from plantations to refineries by large trucks that use the national highway.

A fishing industry is found in Cadiz, and other fishponds that dot the province. One of the country's largest copper mines is located in Sipalay City. There also exists a cottage industry which produces handicrafts made from indigenous materials.

The province is rich in mineral deposits. Minerals that abound in the province are primary copper with an estimated reserve of 591 million metric tons and gold ore with an estimated reserve of 25 million tons. Silver and molybdenum deposits are also abundant, as well as non-metallic minerals suitable for agricultural and industrial uses. Notwithstanding its great potential, the mining industry in Negros Occidental has remained virtually dormant since the biggest copper mine in Sipalay suspended its operation in 2000.

Bacolod is the center of commerce and finance in Negros Occidental. It has oil companies, factories, bottling plants, allied industrial businesses, steel fabrication, power generation, agri-businesses, prawn culture and other aqua-culture ventures.

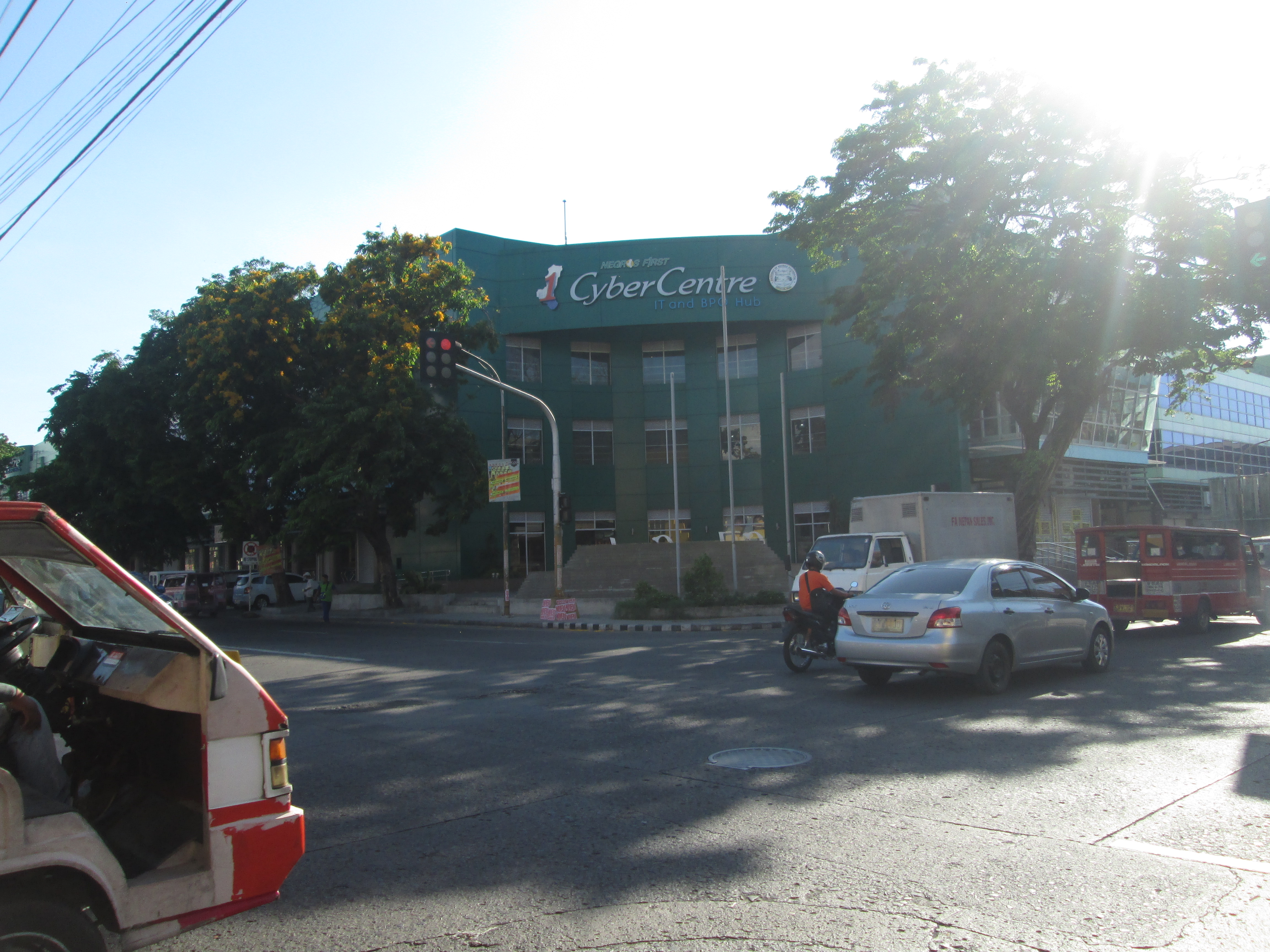
Negros First CyberCentre IT and BPO Hub

It is also the Business Process Outsourcing (BPO) hub of the Negros Island Region of the Philippines. Bacolod has an estimated 35,000 workforce in the IT-BPO industry working in 20 major companies. Among the notable BPO companies operating in the city are Convergys, Teleperformance, TTEC, Focus Direct International, Inc. – Bacolod, Panasiatic Solutions, Ubiquity Global Services, Transcom Asia and iQor. As of 2019, Negros Occidental has a total of 13 operating PEZA-registered IT Parks and Centers.

In 2012, a two-hectare portion of the four-hectare Paglaum Sports Complex was partitioned for the construction of the provincial government-owned Negros First CyberCentre (NFCC) as an IT-BPO Outsourcing Hub with a budget of P674-million. It is located at Lacson Corner Hernaez Streets in Bacolod and offers up to 22,000 square meters of mixed IT-BPO and commercial spaces. Its facilities are divided into three sections — Information Technology, Commercial Support Facilities, and Common IT Facilities. It was inaugurated in April 2015 in rites led by President Benigno S. Aquino III. The area was initially a residential zone and has been reclassified as a commercial zone as approved by the Comprehensive Zoning Ordinance.

By 2014, Negros Occidental was the province with the highest income in all of the Philippines, earning an average of P3.332 billion.

=== Food and agriculture ===
Negros Occidental's output of more than 1 million metric tons for crop year 2002–2003 accounts for nearly half of the country's sugar production in an industry that generates an estimated annual revenue of more than ₱18 billion. There are 12 sugar mills in the province, of which only 10 are presently operational. Victorias Milling Company has the highest rated capacity with 15,000 tonnes cane per day.

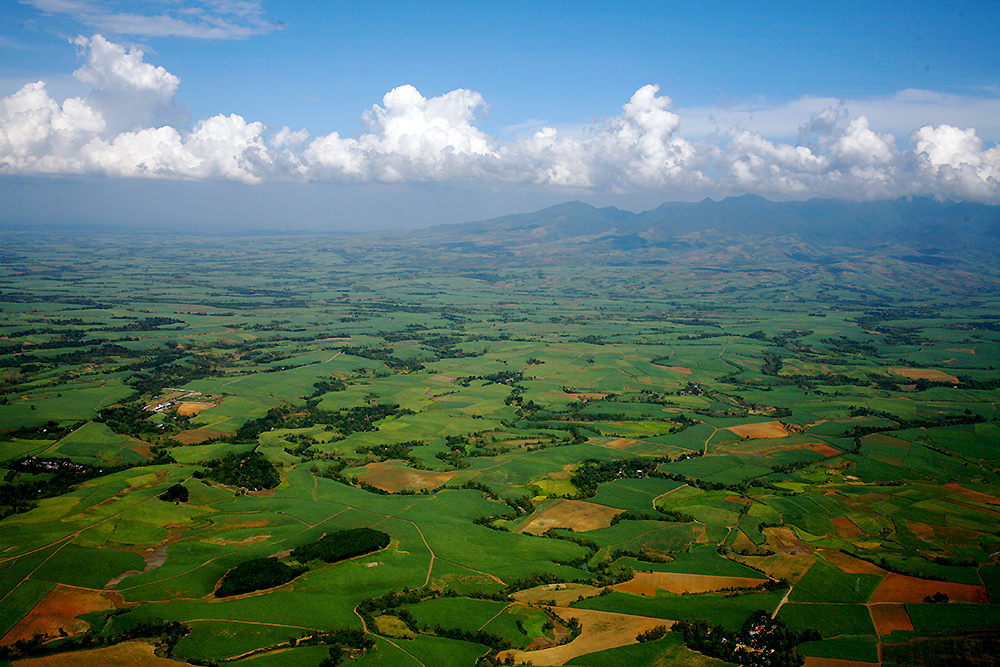
Vast sugarcane plantations near Bacolod

However, the volatility of the sugar industry forced the province to shift, albeit slowly, to other high-value crops and alternative industries. The diversification has proven to be highly successful. Production of rice, the basic commodity for food security, has been increasing. By 2003, annual output of 437 thousand metric tons of palay was 33% better than two years before. This allowed the province to significantly raise its sufficiency level from 65% to more than 84%. The improvement could be attributed to the introduction and promotion of hybrid rice, which increased rice yields to 3.8 metric tons per hectare. Because of the success of the program, area planted to hybrid rice has increased nearly fivefold. The highest hybrid yield was recorded at 10.3 tons per hectare.

Corn also registered increasing gains. Production for 2003 of 42 thousand metric tons outperformed 2001 output by 18%. Average yield per hectare has also grown by 18%. Other fruit and vegetable crops, except for banana and cassava, likewise improved their harvest. Harvested coconut was placed at 139 million nuts, while production of bananas; fruit and vegetable crops totaled 110 million kilograms. Livestock and poultry are industries where Negros Occidental has strongly diversified.

With the province successfully quarantined from the foot and mouth disease and bird flu, as well as with other endemic diseases under control, total production of livestock and poultry in 2003 of 49 thousand metric tons exceeded estimated local demand by 18%. Fishing is likewise an industry where the province has remained focused. After all, 9 of its cities and 16 of its municipalities are located along the coastline and a great portion of the population depends on fishing for their livelihood.

The area for exploitation by this industry is huge, covering most of the coastal areas and the rich fishing grounds of the Visayan Sea on the north, Sulu Sea on the south, Tañon Strait on the east and Guimaras Strait and Panay Gulf at the west. These rich coastal areas and fishing grounds continue to be generous to the people of Negros Occidental. In 2003, products from deep-sea fishing, municipal marine and inland waters, and aquaculture reached 87 thousand metric tons, 30% better than 2001 production.

== Government ==
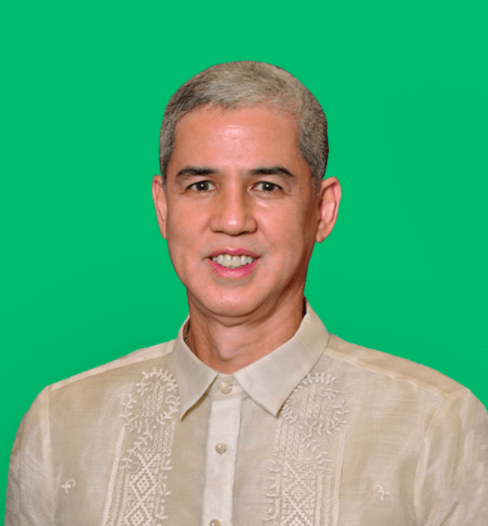
Bong Lacson, the current governor of Negros Occidental

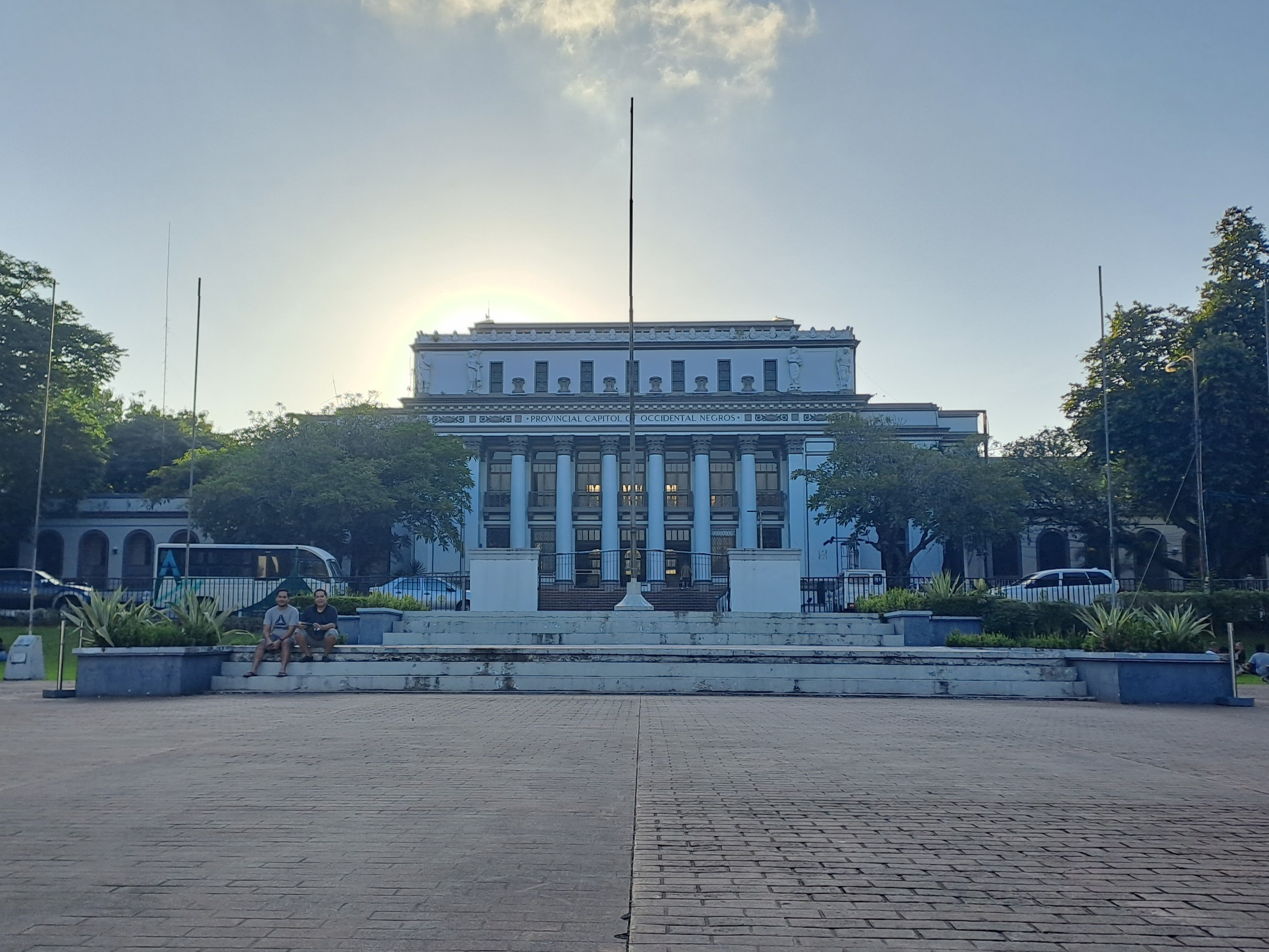
Negros Occidental Provincial Capitol

Bacolod City Government Center

Negros Occidental is headed by a governor and vice governor, which has its offices at the Negros Occidental Provincial Capitol. Both positions are elected by a popular vote to serve for a three-year term. Since the province is an administrative division of the country, it is still subject to the laws and policies of the republic, such as those under the Constitution, Republic Acts, and Executive Orders. Members of the Sangguniang Panlungsod and Sangguniang Bayan of the 13 cities and 19 municipalities, respectively, are also elected by a popular vote, serving for a three-year term as well. Cities and municipalities are further subdivided into barangays, each headed by a barangay captain, who also oversees the administrative services of the government. Bacolod, as a highly urbanized city, is not under the jurisdiction of the provincial government and does not participate in the election of provincial officials, even though it hosts most of the province's government agencies.

Under the House of Representatives, Negros Occidental is represented by six congressional districts. The city of Bacolod, being a highly urbanized city, has its own representation through a separate congressional district. Each of these districts elects its own representative, who is meant to represent certain groups of municipalities and cities. Officials in these positions are elected, by popular vote, to serve for a three-year term as well. In cases where the representatives resign from their position, the position remains vacant until a caretaker is assigned to take over the affected district.

Historically, Negros Occidental has been grouped under Western Visayas for the allocation of regional services as well as for statistical purposes. However, with the reinstatement of Negros Island Region in June 2024, the province is slowly being augmented to the aforementioned new region, with regional operations fully expected by 2025. Fourteen executive departments' regional offices are planned to be established in Bacolod.

=== Congressional districts ===
1st District:

- Cities: Escalante, San Carlos
- Municipalities: Calatrava, Don Salvador Benedicto, Toboso
- Congressman: Julio A. Ledesma IV

2nd District:

- Cities: Cadiz, Sagay
- Municipality: Manapla
- Congressman: Alfredo D. Marañon III

3rd District:

- Cities: Silay, Talisay, Victorias
- Municipalities: Enrique B. Magalona, Murcia
- Congressman: Javier Miguel L. Benitez

4th District:

- Cities: Bago, La Carlota
- Municipalities: Pontevedra, Pulupandan, San Enrique, Valladolid
- Congressman: Jeffrey P. Ferrer

5th District:

- City: Himamaylan
- Municipalities: Binalbagan, Hinigaran, Isabela, La Castellana, Moises Padilla
- Congressman: Emilio Bernardino L. Yulo III

6th District:

- Cities: Kabankalan, Sipalay
- Municipalities: Candoni, Cauayan, Hinoba-an, Ilog
- Congressman: Mercedes K. Alvarez

Lone District of Bacolod:

- Congressman: Alfredo Abelardo B. Benitez

== Festivals and culture ==
=== Festivals ===
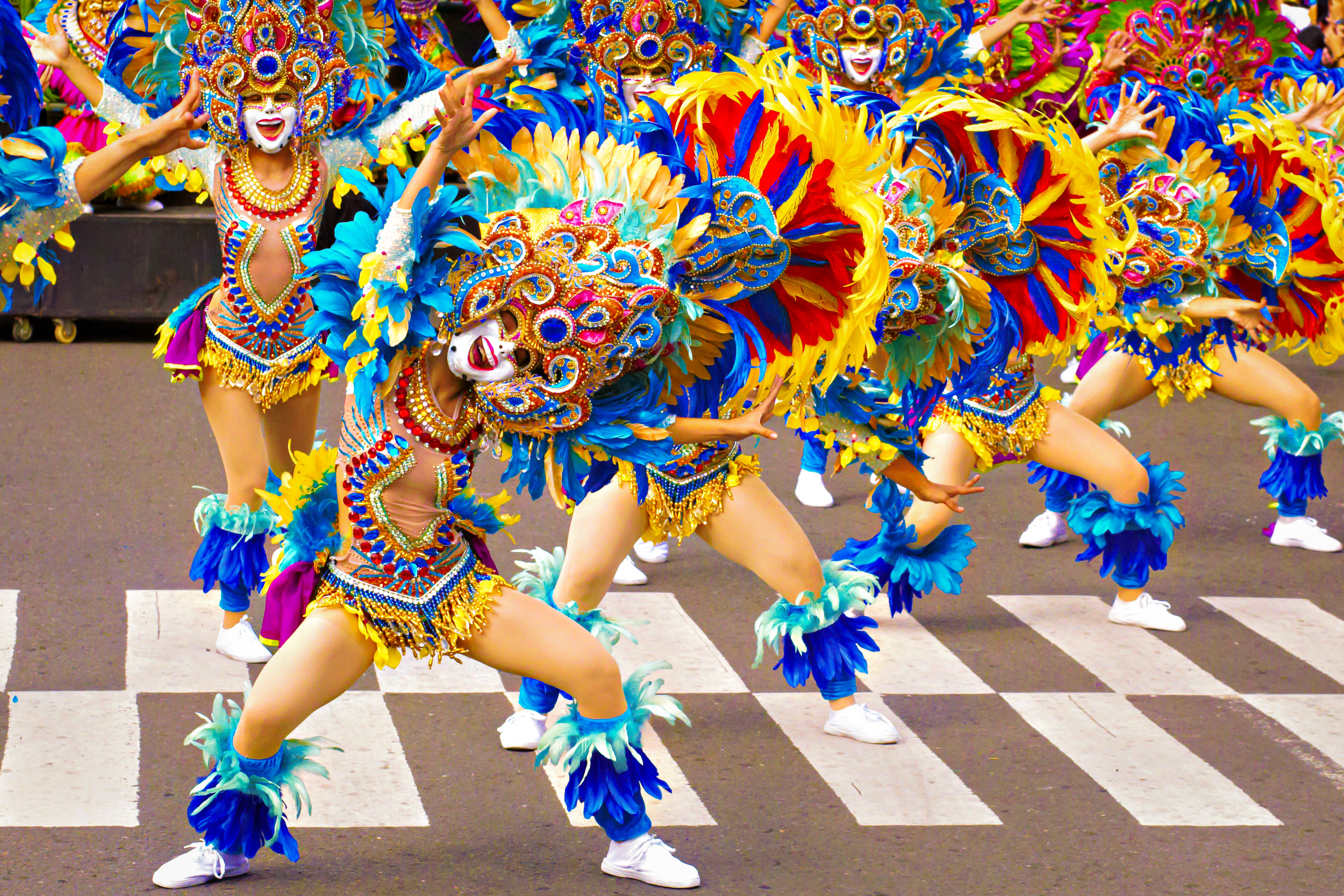
Masskara Festival

==== Panaad sa Negros Festival ====
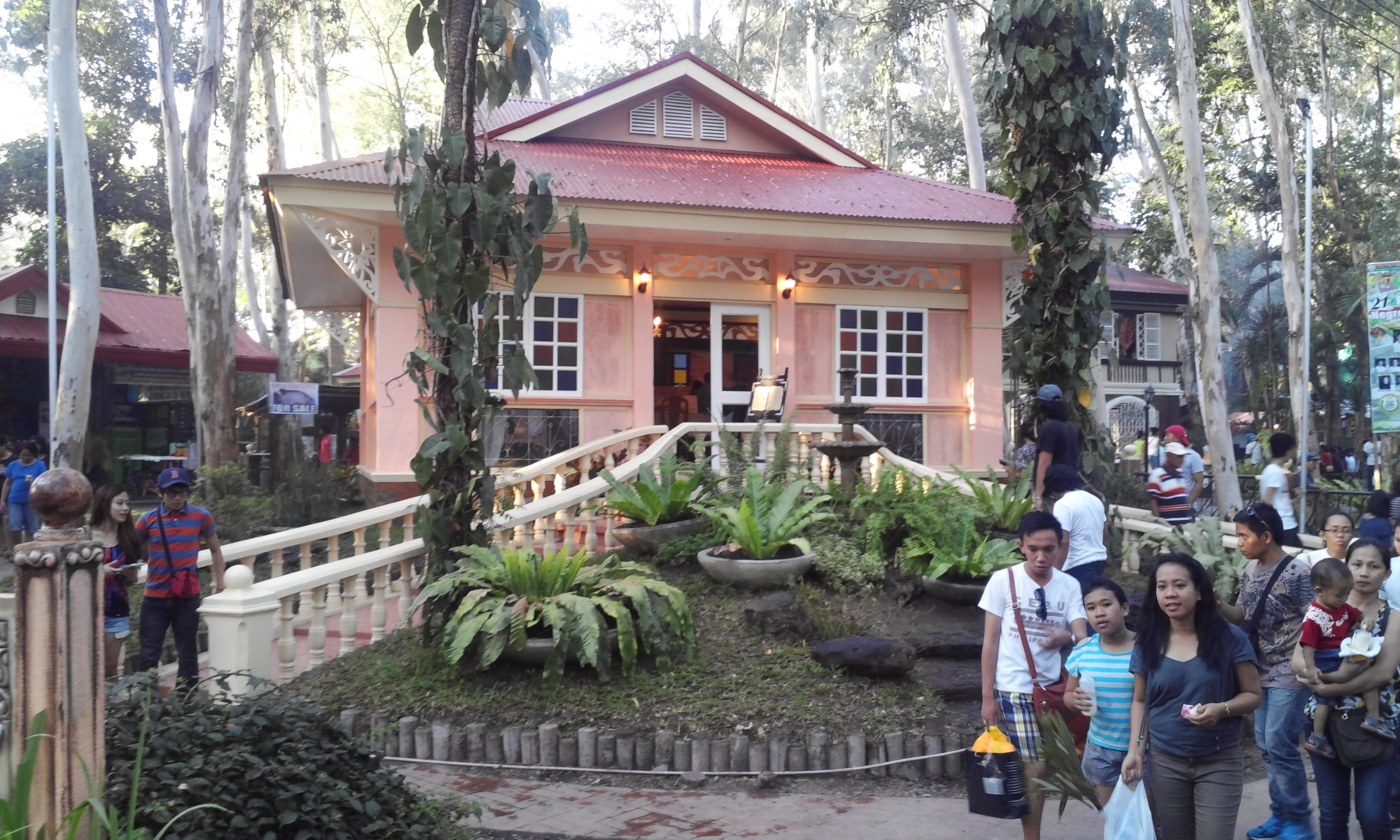
One of the booths in the Panaad sa Negros Festival

The Panaad sa Negros Festival, also called simply as the Panaad Festival (sometimes spelled as Pana-ad), is a festival held annually during the month of April in Bacolod, the capital of Negros Occidental province in the Philippines. Panaad is the Hiligaynon word for "vow" or "promise"; the festival is a form of thanksgiving to Divine Providence and commemoration of a vow in exchange for a good life. The celebration is held at the Panaad Park, which also houses the Panaad Stadium, and is participated in by the 13 cities and 19 towns of the province. For this reason, the province dubs it the "mother" of all its festivals.

The first Panaad sa Negros Festival was held at Capitol Park and Lagoon in a three-day affair in 1993 that started April 30. The festival was held at the lagoon fronting the Provincial Capitol for the first four years. As the festival grew each year, it became necessary to locate a more spacious venue. In 1997, the festival was held in the reclaimed area near where the BREDCO Port is located today. The construction of the Panaad Stadium and sports complex paved the way for the establishment of the Panaad Park as the permanent home of the festival.

==== Negros Island Organic Farmers Festival ====
Negros Island is considered as the Organic Capital of the Philippines since it hosts the longest running organic festival in the Philippines. On August 4, 2005, the provinces of Negros Occidental and Negros Oriental signed a Memorandum of Agreement to promote Sustainable Agriculture and Rural Development in the Island. Starting 2006, a Negros Island Organic Farmers Festival is held to showcase products of Negros Island and to promote organic agriculture.

=== Culture and arts ===
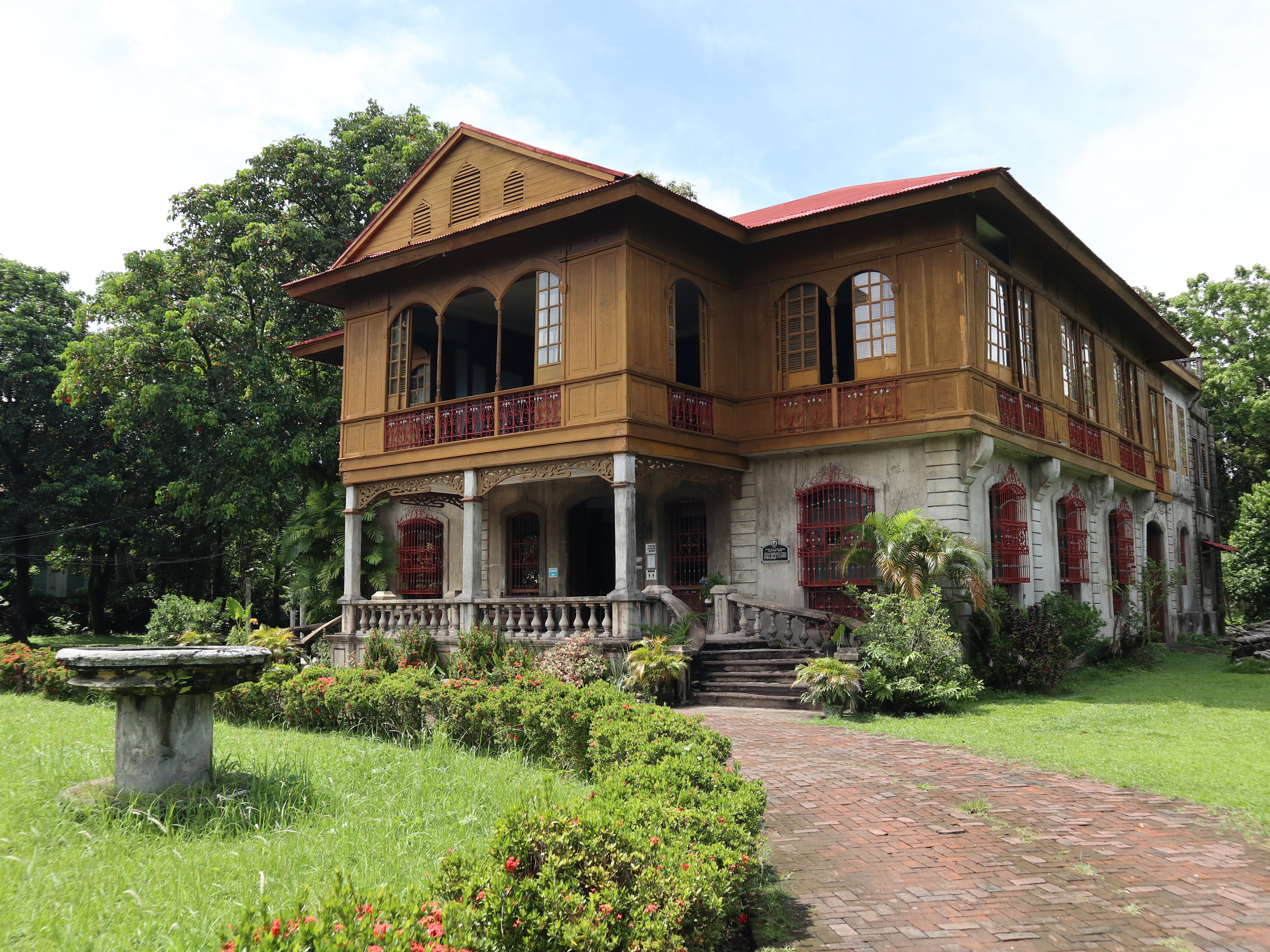
Balay Negrense on Cinco de Noviembre Street

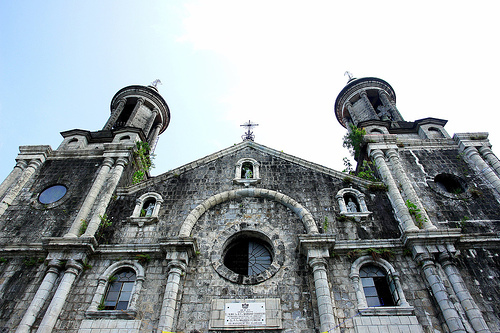
San Sebastian Cathedral

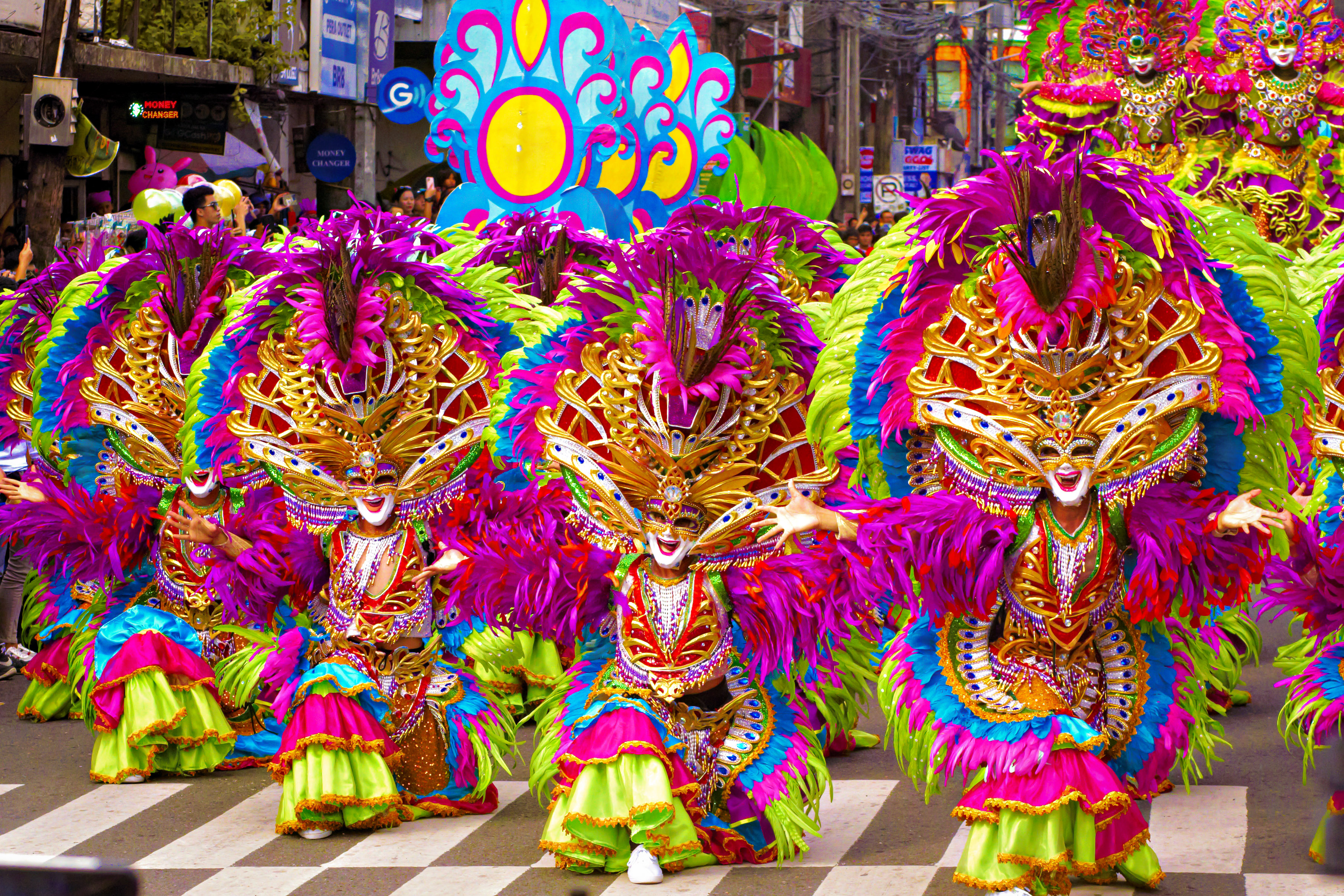
Masskara Festival

Negros Occidental has long been a center of culture and arts; the wealth brought about by the sugar industry made sure that the Negrense principalía enjoyed an above-average standard of living.

Silay City, to the north of the capital of Bacolod, nicknamed the "Paris of Negros", is the cultural and artistic center of Negros Island Region. It has 30 heritage houses declared by the national historical institute, the most notable of which is Balay Negrense; it is also the hometown of National Artist of the Philippines for Architecture Leandro Locsin and international mezzo-soprano Conchita Gaston.

This blossoming in art was due to the economic importance of the area during the Spanish era, Negros became probably the most hispanized and pro-Spanish area, due to the enormous investments of Spain in the sugar business.

Another famous treasure of Negrense art heritage can be found in Victorias City, within the confines of the Victorias Milling Company in its chapel is the world-famous mural of the Angry Christ, painted by artist Alfonso Ossorio, a scion of the Ossorio family who owned the mill.

The Negrenses' joie de vivre is manifest in the various festivals all over the province, foremost being the famous MassKara Festival of Bacolod, Pasalamat Festival of La Carlota, Bailes de Luces of La Castellana and Pintaflores Festival of San Carlos. These and other local festivals are featured during the Pana-ad sa Negros Festival staged every April at the 25-hectare (62-acre) tree-lined Panaad Stadium in Bacolod. Dubbed as the "Festival of Festivals", Pana-ad brings together the 13 cities and 19 towns in a showcase of history, arts and culture, tourism, trade, commerce and industry, beauty and talent as well as games and sports.

Negros Occidental is rich in structures and buildings that are remnants of a once affluent lifestyle. The Palacio Episcopal (1930), San Sebastian Cathedral (1876), and the Capitol Building (1931) are popular landmarks. In most towns, steam locomotives that used to cart sugarcane from the fields to refineries attract steam-engine enthusiasts from all over the world. There are also impressive churches all over the province, both built recently and during the Spanish era.

"Manok ni Cano Gwapo Tan" is a Guinness World Records verified largest chicken building. Unveiled on October 19, 2024, the giant rooster hotel at Campuestohan Highland Resort is a monument and memorial to Negros Occidental's cockfighting industry.

Negros Occidental, as the "Organic Food Bowl of the Philippines" is the host of the IFOAM - Organics International's 2027 "Organic World Congress".

== Sports ==
Negros Occidental has produced a large number of athletes that have achieved success on both national and international circuits. The province is also well known for hosting national and international athletic events, which has given it a reputation as the sports capital of the Philippines.

- Alice Cusay Babiera - 3x Palarong Pambansa gold medalist in 400m, 800m, 1500m 1973-1974; later became a radio journalist and sports coach in Negros Occidental.

=== Football ===
Negros Occidental has a long, entrenched history when it comes to football. The first ever Filipino to play in the European football circuit was Bacolod-born Manuel Amechazurra, who joined FC Barcelona from 1905 to 1915.

The Panaad Stadium in Bacolod has been a venue for national and international athletic events; such as the 23rd Southeast Asian Games men's football and the 2006 ASEAN football qualifiers. On February 9, 2011, the stadium hosted a match between the Philippines national football team and Mongolia in the 2012 AFC Challenge Cup qualification with an attendance of 20,000 people.

Bacolod has been christened as Philippine "football city" for its patronage of the sport in the country. A few members of the Philippine football team are from Negros: most notable is goalkeeper Eduard Sacapaño, a native of Bago; Tating Pasilan and Jinggoy Valmayor of San Carlos City; and ace striker Joshua Beloya of Bacolod.

Negros Occidental has its own football association: Negros Occidental F.A. It works under the Philippine Football Federation as provincial football association for the Negros Occidental area. The Negros Occidental FA sends a team to represent the region in the yearly PFF National Men's Open Championship and PFF National Women's Open Championship. In the 2011 season of the PFF Suzuki Cup U-23 National Championship, Negros were crowned champions where they defeated their fierce rival Iloilo (IFA) in the finals.

The inaugural edition of the FIFA Futsal Women's World Cup will be co-hosted by the component city of Victorias, along with Pasig in Metro Manila, in late 2025.

==== Ceres-Negros F.C. ====
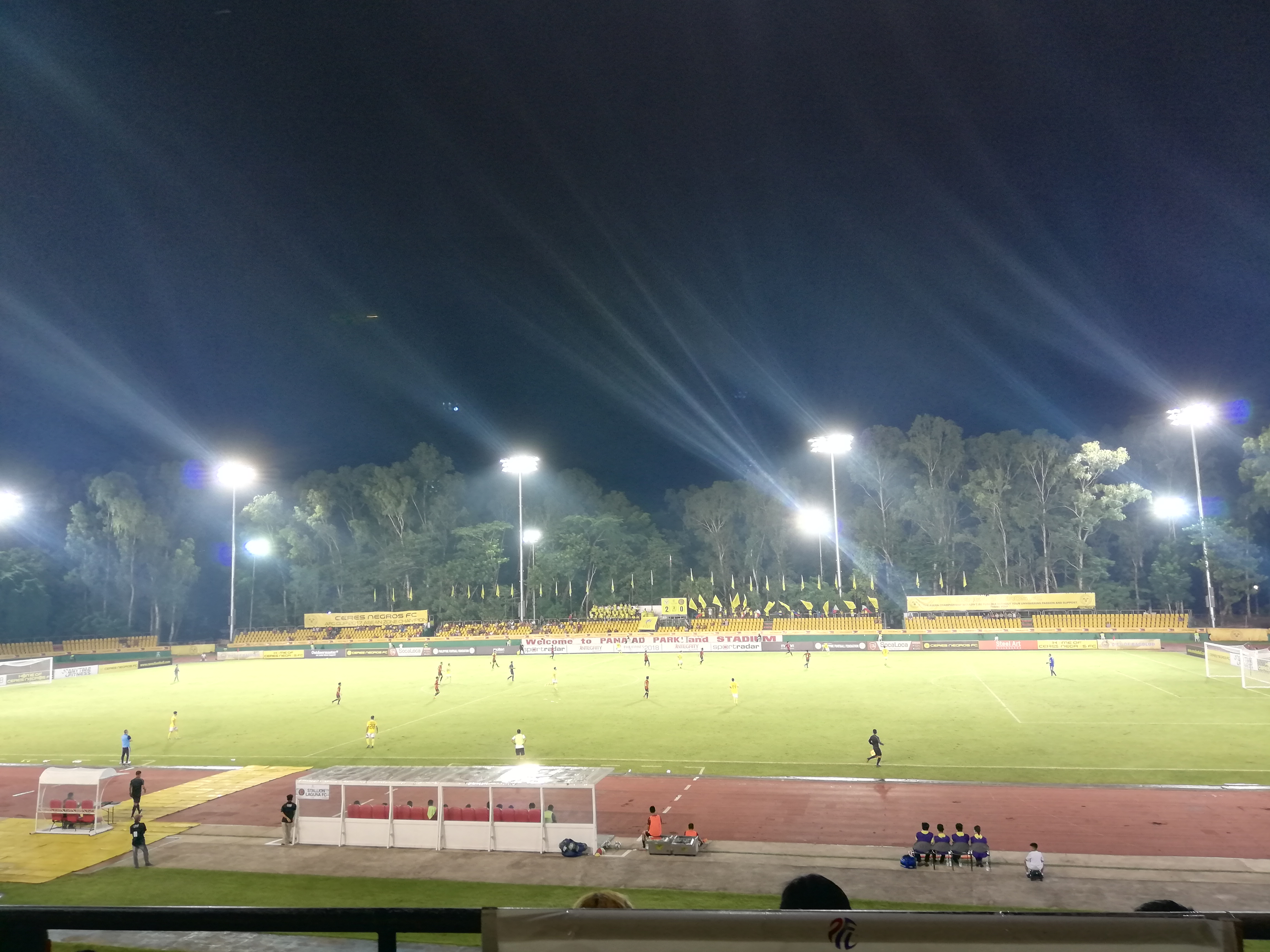
Panaad Stadium, the former home of the Ceres-Negros FC

Negros Occidental was also home of the 2013 PFF National Men's Club Champions and four-time Philippines Football League Champions, Ceres-Negros, who represented the province (as Ceres–Negros or just Ceres) in the said tournaments. Ceres Negros is based in the city of Bacolod, Negros Occidental that plays in the Philippines Football League. The club was previously known as the Ceres–La Salle Football Club.

In the 2013 PFF National Men's Club Championship, they battled UFL Cup Champions Stallion in the Round of 16 and won 1–0. They battled 2012 UFL Champions Global in the quarterfinals and also won 1–0. In the semifinals, Ceres FC topped Kaya with a 3–1 scoreline to enter the finals. They eventually won the 2013 PFF National Men's Club Championship trophy after they beat the other finalist PSG with 1–0 score. Ceres-Negros FC is also the Philippines Football League back-to-back champion for four seasons, from 2017 to 2020.

- 2020 - PFL Champion;
- 2019 - PFL Champion;
- 2018 - PFL Champion;
- 2017 - PFL Champion;
- 2017 - AFC Cup ASEAN Zone Champion;
- 2015 - UFL Division 1 Champion;
- 2014 - UFL FA League Cup Champion;
- 2014 - UFL Division 2 Champion;
- 2014 - PFF National Men's Club Champion;
- 2013 - PFF National Men's Club Champion;
- 2012 - Negros Men's Open Football Champion;

=== Boxing ===
Negros Occidental has produced many of the nation's finest boxers. The likes of 1923 World Flyweight boxing champion, Francisco Guilledo a.k.a. Pancho Villa, former WBO champion Donnie Nietes, 1970's WBA world junior lightweight champion Ben Villaflor, all hail from Negros Occidental.

It is also notable for producing Olympians: silver medalist Mansueto Velasco in the 1996 Summer Olympics and Mansueto's brother, bronze medalist Roel Velasco in the 1992 Summer Olympics.

=== Golf ===
Bacolod has two major golf courses. These are the Bacolod Golf and Country Club and the Negros Occidental Golf and Country Club. The city hosted the 61st Philippine Airlines Inter-club Golf Tournament and the 2008 Philippine Amateur Golf Championship.

=== Karatedo ===
Bacolod hosted two major karatedo championships, the 1996 Philippine Karatedo Federation National Championship and the 2007 20th PKF National Open. Both tournaments were held at the La Salle Coliseum of USLS. The tournaments were contested by hundreds of karatedo practitioners all over the country.

=== Basketball ===
The province is home to two professional basketball teams: the Bacolod City of Smiles and Negros Muscovados, both playing in the Maharlika Pilipinas Basketball League. It was also the home of the Negros Slashers of the Metropolitan Basketball Association

Bacolod hosted the 2008 PBA All-Star Weekend and has since become a regular venue for the Philippine Basketball Association's out-of-town games.

=== Mixed Martial Arts ===
Bacolod and its neighboring cities and towns are home to many mixed martial arts competitions including quarterly fights hosted by the Universal Reality Combat Championship (URCC).

== Infrastructure ==
=== Transportation by Sea and Air ===
Through its capital, Bacolod, Negros Occidental is only 50 minutes from Manila and 30 minutes from Cebu by air. By sea, it is an 18-hour cruise from Manila and an hour by fast ferries from Iloilo. It is also accessible by sea and land trips from Cebu via Escalante, San Carlos City, and in Negros Oriental via Guihulngan, Amlan, and Sibulan. Travel from Bacolod to Dumaguete is only 5 to 6 hours by land. Several airline companies, including Philippine Airlines, Cebu Pacific, and Philippines AirAsia serve the province. Several inter-island shipping lines call on nine seaports of Negros Occidental.

==== Bacolod–Silay Airport ====
The Bacolod-Silay Airport Terminal Building

On January 18, 2008, the new airport was inaugurated in Silay City, 16 kilometers north of Bacolod. The new airport replaced the old Bacolod City Domestic Airport. The new airport runway is of international standards and was constructed to facilitate future landings of international flights to serve the growing number of tourists visiting Negros Occidental each year.

==== Kabankalan City Domestic Airport ====
A new airport designed to serve the general area of Kabankalan City. The airport would be the second airport in Negros Occidental, after the Bacolod-Silay International Airport and the third airport on Negros Island Region. It is located four kilometers northeast of Kabankalan City proper on a 100-hectare (250-acre) site in Barangay Hilamonan. The completion of the airport is still ongoing.

==== Sipalay Airport ====
On August 3, 2017, Air Juan started to open flights to Sipalay City from Cebu and Iloilo. Flights from Cebu to Sipalay will be every Wednesday while Sipalay to Cebu on Sundays; Iloilo to Sipalay on Mondays and return on Thursdays. Sipalay Mayor Oscar C. Montilla, Jr. had been looking forward to having an airline company operate in the city to boost tourism. The small Sipalay airport with a 1,400-meter runway is located on a 10-hectare (25-acre) property of the local government. Negros Occidental Governor Alfredo G. Marañon, Jr. has committed to support the planned concreting of the runway.

=== Road network and accommodations ===
All cities and municipalities are linked by an extensive road and bridge network stretching more than 1,500 kilometers crisscrossing the province with seven alternative scenic routes to the nearby province of Negros Oriental. Within the province, travel is also easy, comfortable and even enjoyable with air-conditioned and non-aircon buses or metered taxis. Car rental services are also available. However, the jeepney is still the most common means of transport among towns and cities. For accommodations, visitors may choose from a wide range of about 67 hotels, pension and lodging houses and tourist inns.

==== Bacolod-Negros Occidental Economic Highway ====
DPWH Director Sanny Boy Orope announced the completion of the PHP7.389 billion Bacolod-Negros Occidental Economic Highway by June 30. The 48.8-kilometer road will connect Bacolod at Barangay Sum-ag to Victorias City at Bacolod North Road intersection. The Highway project includes construction and improvement of 16 bridges, plus the "section from Bacolod City to Bacolod–Silay Airport, passing through its Access Road crossing.

=== Energy and water ===
The province has adequate power and water supplies. It is currently interconnected to the Visayas Power Grid whose main sources of power are geothermal. Aside from its existing 170 megawatts capacity, Negros Island by 2006 has an additional 105 megawatts of locally produced power from geothermal plants in Bago and in barangay Palinpinon, Valencia, Negros Oriental, and from bagasse co-generation facility of First Farmers Sugar Mill. Ample water supply for household, commercial, industrial and agricultural uses is assured by 73 thousand hectares of proclaimed and protected major watersheds, regular rainfall and six major river systems.

San Carlos City is going to play a major role in renewable energy as it will be the site of San Carlos Solar Energy INC. It is a solar farm with an initial capacity of 13 MW in Phase 1, and a provision for an addition of 7 MW in Phase 2. It is intended to provide power to the grid throughout the year, at pre-determined Feed-In-Tariff rates set by the ERC. It is a DOE approved stand-alone solar power plant consisting of approximately 52,000 modules.

In Calatrava, ABOITIZ Renewables, Inc. operates its 173-megawatt-peak "Calatrava Solar Project", delivering power with the aid of the NGCP through the Calatrava substation.

=== Communications and medical facilities ===
Dr. Pablo O. Torre Memorial Hospital

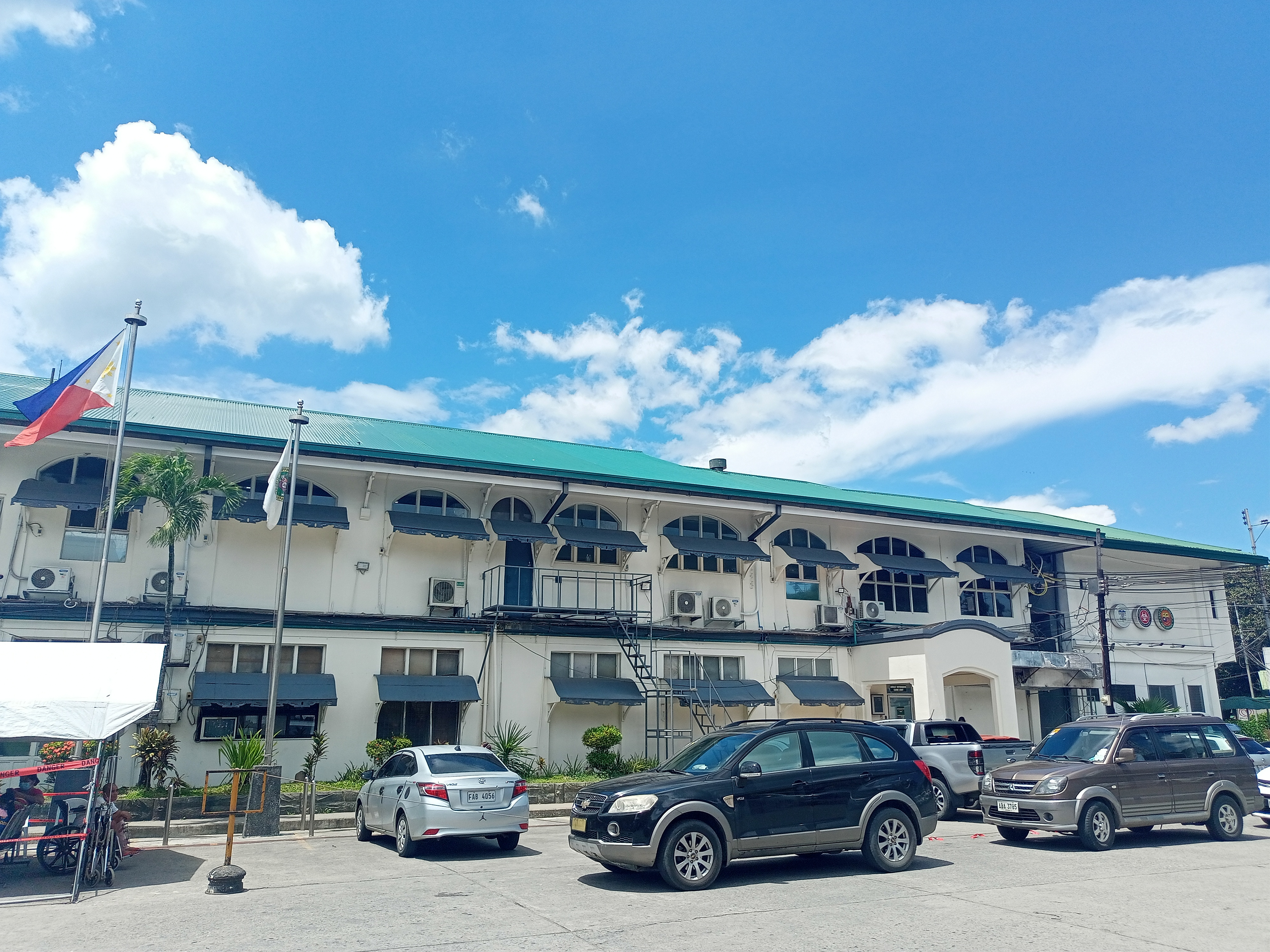
Corazon Locsin Montelibano Memorial Regional Hospital

International direct dialing, fiber optic data lines and internet services are accessible in most areas of the province. Also, GSM, digital and analog cellular networks provide good coverage in Bacolod and other areas, including international roaming. The medical and health care needs of the people of Negros Occidental and its guests are presently being met by 20 government hospitals (which include the Corazon Locsin Montelibano Memorial Regional Hospital in Bacolod and the Teresita Lopez Jalandoni Provincial Hospital in Silay) and 10 private hospitals, as well as several city and municipal health centers, barangay health stations and day-care centers.

=== Banking, finance and accessibility ===
Banking and finance is a thriving industry in Negros Occidental. According to the latest count, there are 389 financial institutions competing for businesses in the province. 149 of these are banks. Negros Occidental offers several advantages for those who are doing business in the province. It is strategically located near Metro Manila, Metro Cebu and Metro Davao, all major international gateways with a maximum travel time of only about 4 hours between the Philippines and its neighbors in Southeast Asia. It is equipped with major infrastructure facilities for easy travel and shipment of goods within and outside of Negros.

It has information and communication facilities with connection capabilities necessary for, among others, call center operations for business communication and transmission of data. The province has an abundant water supply and a dependable power supply. Modern health care facilities with medical services are available, as well as academic institutions.

== Landmarks ==
=== Panaad Park and Sports Complex ===
The Panaad Park and Sports Complex houses the Panaad Stadium which is a multi-purpose stadium in the province. It is currently used mostly for football matches, and was used for the 2005 South East Asian Games. It was the venue of the pre-qualifiers of the 2007 ASEAN Football Championship or ASEAN Cup, in which the Philippines, Cambodia, Timor Leste, Brunei and Laos participated. The stadium has a seating capacity of 15,500, but holds around 20,000 people with standing areas. It is unofficially designated as the home stadium of the Philippines national football team. Aside from the association football field, it also has a rubberized track oval, an Olympic-size swimming pool and other sports facilities.

The stadium is also the home of Panaad sa Negros Festival, a week-long celebration participated in by all cities and municipalities in the province held annually every summer. The festival is highlighted by merry-making and field demonstrations at the stadium. The stadium itself features replicas of the landmarks of the 13 cities and municipalities of Negros Occidental.

=== Capitol Park and Lagoon ===
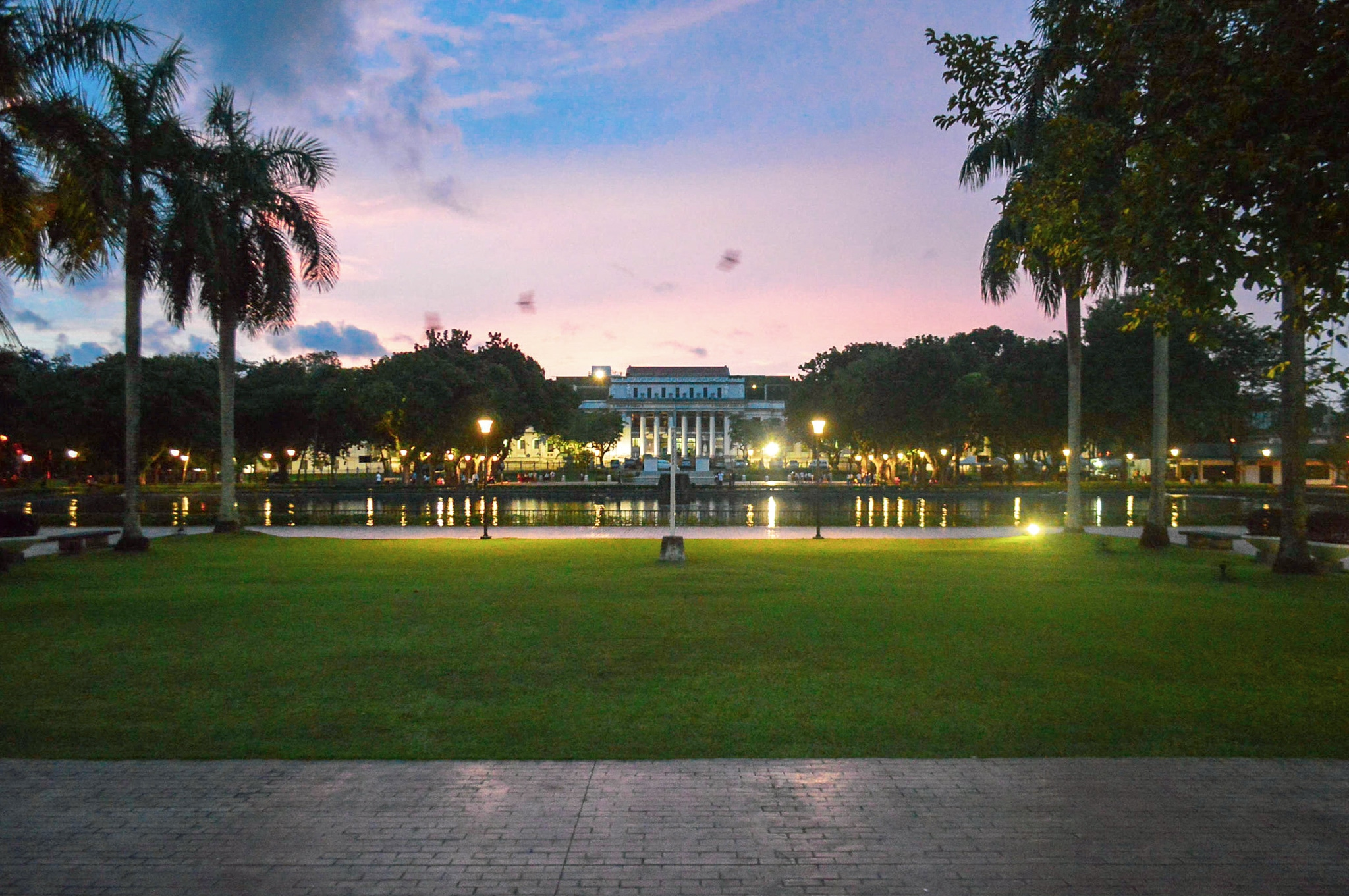
Capitol Park and Lagoon

The Capitol Park and Lagoon is a provincial park located right in the heart of Bacolod, Negros Occidental, in the Philippines. One of the landmarks of the park is the statue of a carabao (water buffalo) being pulled by a woman. This statue is located at the northern end of the lagoon. On the other end, there is also another carabao sculpture but the figure is being pulled by a man.

Local everyday activities in the park include jogging, aerobics, school dance rehearsals, promenaders, arnisadors, and martial arts practitioners.

=== Fountain of Justice ===
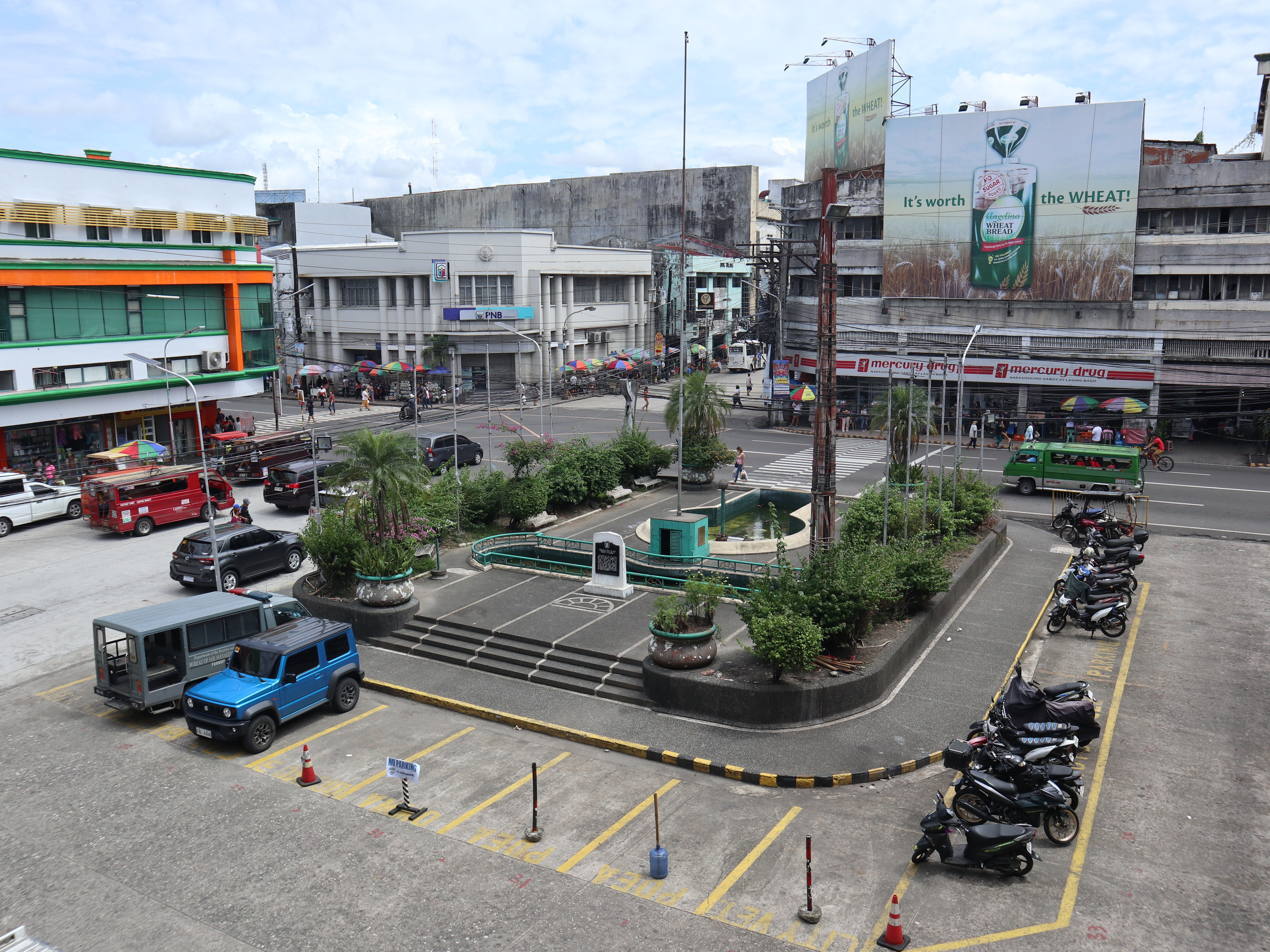
Fountain of Justice, Bacolod

The Fountain of Justice is a historic landmark in Bacolod, Negros Occidental, Philippines. It marks the location where the house of Jose Ruiz de Luzurriaga used to stand. It was in this house that the surrender of Bacolod by Spanish authorities to the Filipino forces of Gen. Aniceto Lacson took place on November 6, 1898, during the Negros Revolution.

=== Bacolod Public Plaza ===
The Bacolod Public Plaza is one of the notable landmarks of Bacolod, the capital of Negros Occidental, Philippines. It is located in the heart of the downtown area, near the city hall and across from the San Sebastian Cathedral. The plaza is a trapezoidal park with a belt of trees around the periphery and a gazebo at the center. Scattered within the trees are four circular fountains.

The plaza was constructed in 1927 as a place for recreation, political, spiritual and cultural activities. It is quite a popular site for outdoor picnics and concerts. The gazebo is often used to house a bandstand.

=== Balay Negrense ===
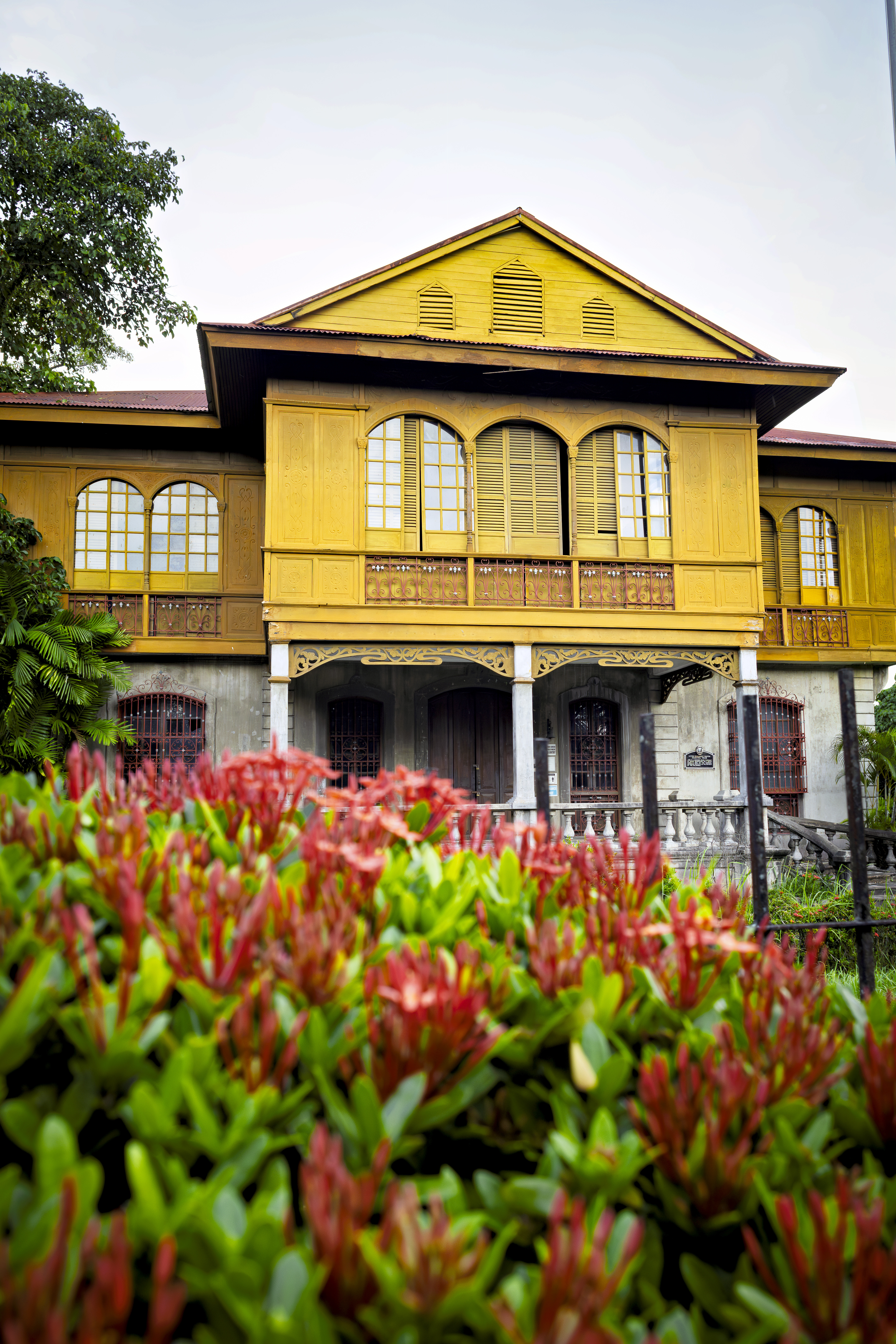
Facade of Balay Negrense.

The Balay Negrense was originally the ancestral house of Victor F. Gaston, a son of Yves Leopold Germain Gaston and Prudencia Fernandez. The elder Gaston is credited as one of the pioneers of sugarcane cultivation in this portion of the Philippine archipelago. A native of Normandy in France, he married a Filipina from Batangas where he initially began experimenting with sugar production before relocating to Negros.

Built in 1897, the structure housed Victor Gaston and his twelve children from 1901 until his death in 1927. Left unused by the family, the structure was abandoned in the mid-1970s and fell into disrepair until a group of concerned Negrenses formed what would later become the Negros Cultural Foundation and managed to acquire the house from the heirs of Gaston through a donation. With donations from prominent individuals and later the Department of Tourism, the structure was repaired and furnished with period furniture and fixtures. The museum was officially inaugurated on October 6, 1990.

=== Mariano Ramos Ancestral House ===
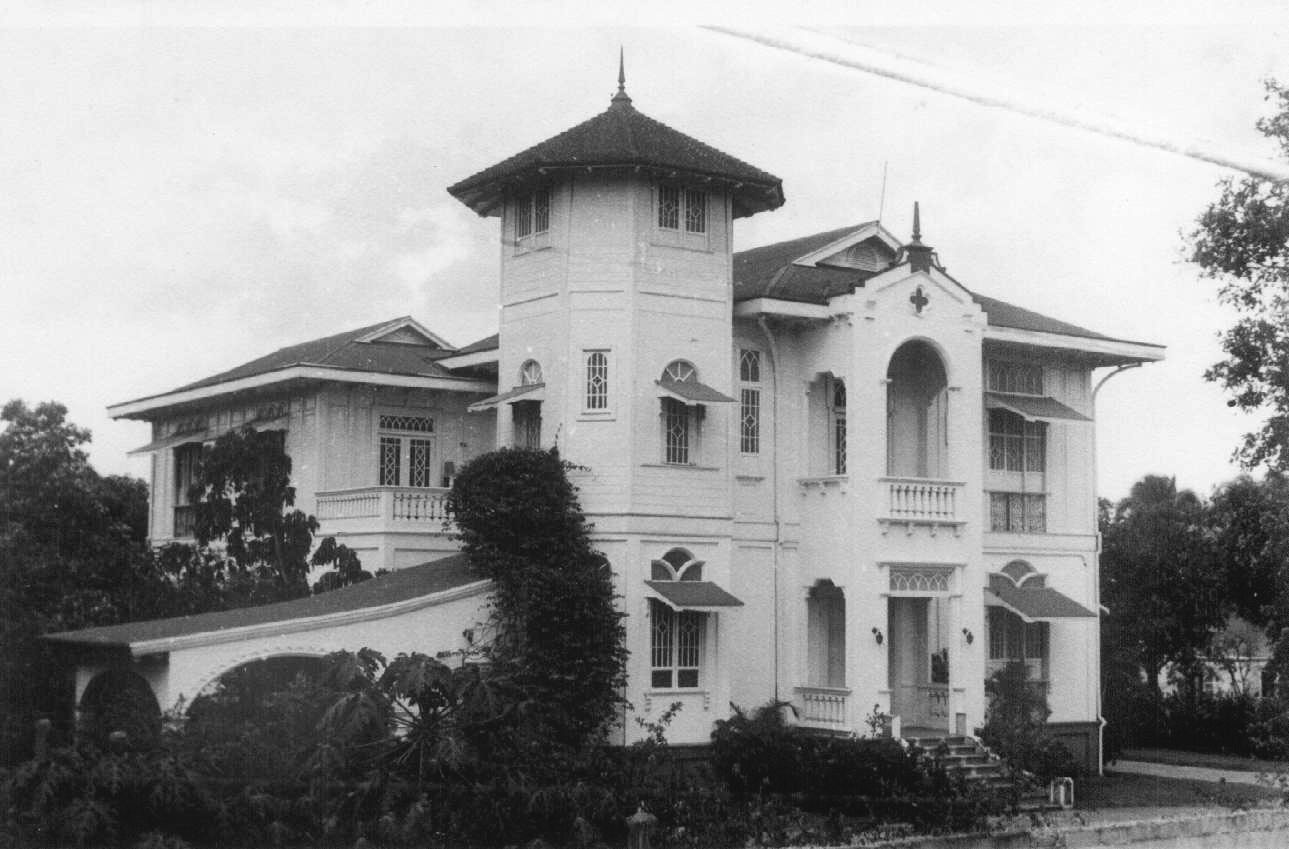
Mariano V. Ramos Ancestral House, Bacolod

The Mariano Ramos Ancestral House is the home of the late Don Mariano V. Ramos, the son of Agaton Ramos and Dolores Varela, was the first appointed Presidente Municipal of Bacolod, Philippines. It was built in the 1930s and its architecture is a combination of Castilian and Tuscan and has three storeys, including the tower room, known as the torre.

During World War II, Don Mariano's Ancestral house was the most prominent structure with a view over the whole city. The commanding Japanese general was disguised as a family gardener. As the war broke, the Japanese seized the Mariano Ramos Ancestral house in order to use it as a watchtower and as a headquarters.

=== San Diego Pro-cathedral ===
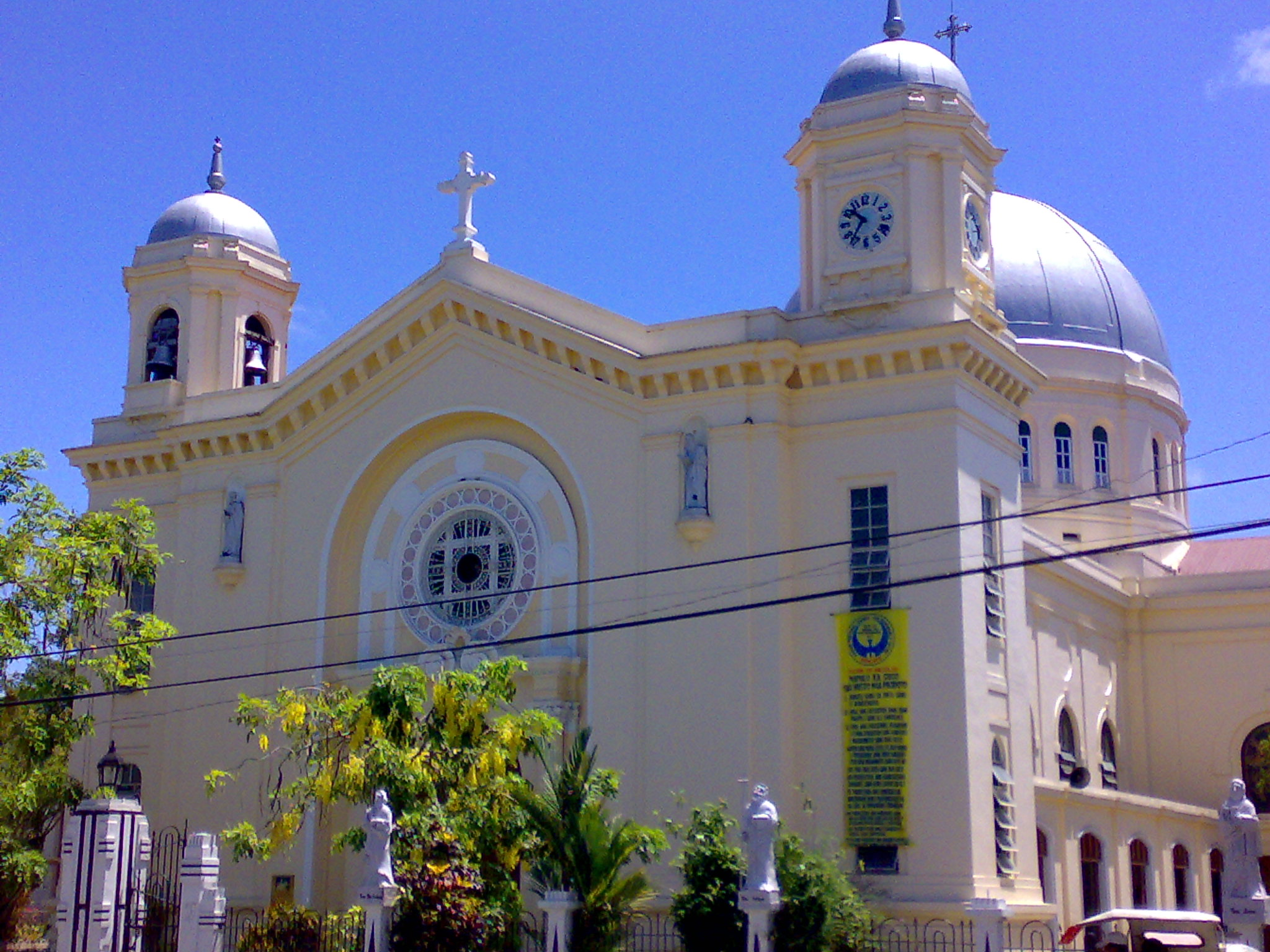
San Diego Pro-cathedral, Silay City

The San Diego Pro-cathedral, formerly known as the San Diego Parish Church or the St. Didacus Parish Church before its declaration as a pro-cathedral in 1994, is an early 20th-century church in Silay City, Negros Occidental in the Philippines. It is the only pro-cathedral outside of the national capital of Manila, and is unique in Negros Occidental for being the only church in the province featuring a cupola or dome.

=== The Ruins ===
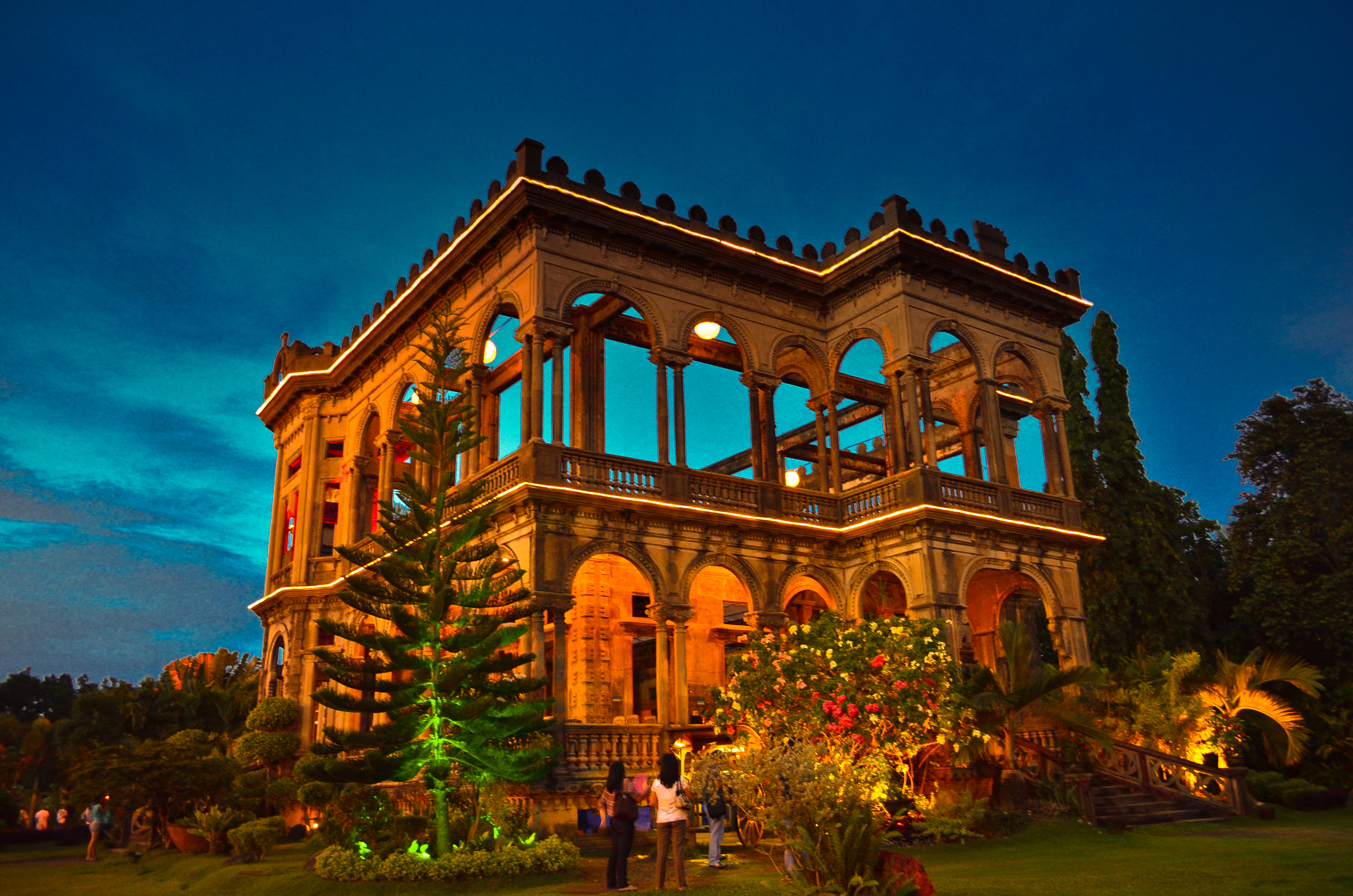
The Ruins, Talisay City

The mansion dates back to the 1900s when it was built by sugar baron Don Mariano Ledesma Lacson for his first wife, Maria Braga, a Portuguese from Macau whom he met on his vacations in Hong Kong. The mansion's structure is of Italianate architecture enhanced by a belvedere complete with renaissance-type balustrading typical of the homes of English ship captains. It was burned down in World War II to prevent the Japanese from using it. It was opened to the public by descendants of the original owner and is listed as among the World's 12 most fascinating ruins.

=== Paglaum Sports Complex ===
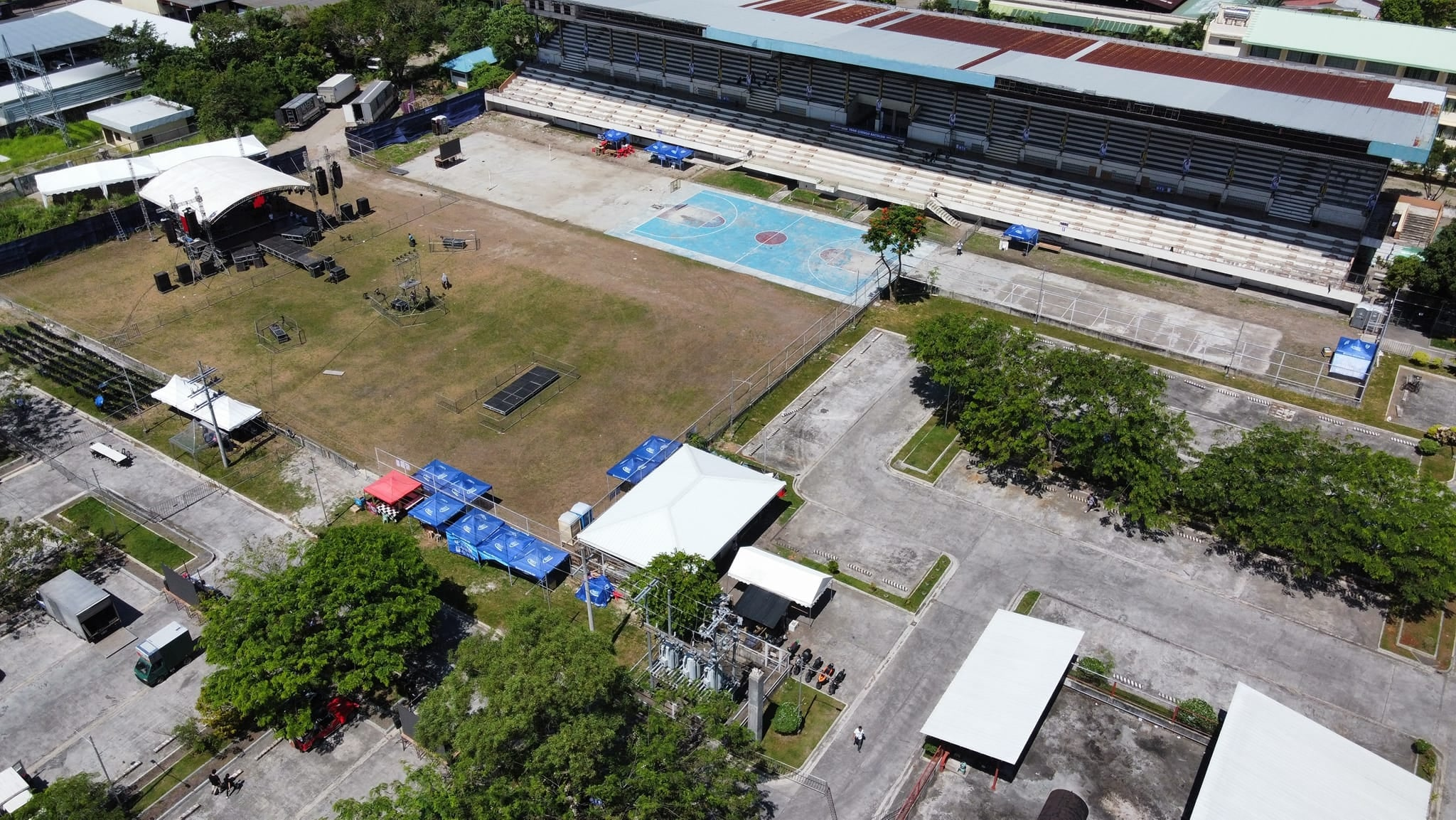
Inside the Paglaum Sports Complex

The Paglaum Sports Complex is a provincial-owned sports venue adjacent to the Negros Occidental High School established during the 1970s that hosted various football events, such as the 1991 Philippines International Cup and the football event of the 2005 Southeast Asian Games. It also hosted three editions of the Palarong Pambansa (1971, 1974, 1979). However, the stadium became unfit to host football matches following the erection of business establishments around the area. In 2012, a two-hectare portion of the four-hectare complex was partitioned for the construction of the Capitol-owned Negros First CyberCentre (NFCC) as an IT-BPO Outsourcing Hub. As of 2013, the provincial government has been proposing for a renovation of the stadium to serve as an alternative venue to Panaad Park and Sports Complex, particularly for football competitions. Recently, the Paglaum Sports Complex also serves as an alternative venue to the Bacolod Public Plaza for the MassKara Festival celebration.

=== Negros Occidental Multi-Purpose Activity Center ===
The Negros Occidental Multi-Purpose Activity Center (NOMPAC) is a provincial-owned multi-use gym located in Bacolod, adjacent to the Capitol Park and Lagoon. It is currently used mostly for basketball, karatedo and boxing matches. Aside from the gym, it also serves as evacuation site of the city and province during disasters and likewise serves as cultural facilities for many events and celebrations.

=== Negros Occidental Convention Center ===
Eugenio Jose Lacson led the groundbreaking of the 2-story multipurpose PHP1.03 billion Negros Occidental Convention Center in Silay. It was Mayor Albee Benitez who initiated the project near the Bacolod-Silay Airport. His brother 3rd District Rep. Jose Francisco Benitez certified the center as green building for conferences, cultural events, and social gatherings.

== Education ==
University of Negros Occidental - Recoletos

There are 1,318 schools in the province; 53 are registered technical schools including the Technological University of the Philippines – Visayas and Carlos Hilado Memorial State University both in Talisay City. Of these, 158 are private schools, including University of Saint La Salle, STI West Negros University, Colegio San Agustin - Bacolod, La Consolacion College Bacolod, VMA Global College, University of Negros Occidental - Recoletos, Central Philippines State University, Philippine Normal University Visayas, Southland College and Central Philippine Adventist College.

=== Universities and colleges ===
==== Universities ====
- Carlos Hilado Memorial State University – Main Campus, Talisay City
  - Carlos Hilado Memorial State University – Alijis Campus, Bacolod
  - Carlos Hilado Memorial State University – Fortune Towne Campus, Bacolod
  - Carlos Hilado Memorial State University – College of Fisheries, Binalbagan
- Central Philippines State University – Main Campus (Kabankalan)
  - Candoni Campus
  - Cauayan Campus
  - Sipalay Campus
  - Hinigaran Campus
  - San Carlos Campus
  - Victorias Campus
  - Ilog Campus
  - Hinoba-an Campus
  - Moises Padilla Campus
- National University Bacolod
- State University of Northern Negros – Main Campus (Sagay City)
  - State University of Northern Negros – School of Nursing Campus (Cadiz)
  - State University of Northern Negros – Calatrava Campus
  - State University of Northern Negros – Escalante Campus
- Philippine Normal University Visayas (Cadiz)
- STI West Negros University
- Technological University of the Philippines Visayas, Talisay City Campus
  - Technological University of the Philippines Visayas, Sagay City Extension Campus
  - Technological University of the Philippines Visayas, Cadiz Extension Campus
- University of Saint La Salle
- University of Negros Occidental – Recoletos
- West Visayas State University – Himamaylan City Campus

==== Colleges ====
- ABE International Business College – Bacolod Campus
- AMA Computer College – Bacolod Campus
- Aeronavigation Academy International Philippines, Inc.
- Asian College of Aeronautics – Main Campus (Bacolod)
- Bacolod Christian College of Negros
- Bacolod City College
- Bago City College
- Binalbagan Catholic College
- Cabarrus Catholic College
- Central Negros College
- Central Philippine Adventist College
- Colegio de Santa Ana de Victorias
- Colegio de Santa Rita de San Carlos, Inc.
- Colegio de Santo Tomas – Recoletos
- Colegio San Agustin – Bacolod
- College of Arts & Sciences of Asia & the Pacific – Bacolod Campus
- Convention Baptist Bible College
- FAST Aviation Academy, Inc. – Bacolod
- Fellowship Baptist College
- Fortress College
- John B. Lacson Colleges Foundation – Bacolod
- Kabankalan Catholic College
- La Carlota City College
- La Consolacion College Bacolod
- La Consolacion College Isabela
- La Consolacion College Murcia
- LaSalTech, Inc.
  - LaSalTech - Bacolod
  - LaSalTech - Cadiz
  - LaSalTech - Kabankalan
  - LaSalTech - La Carlota
- Mapúa Malayan Digital College – Learning Hub Bacolod
- Mount Carmel College of Escalante, Inc.
- Negros Occidental Language and Information Technology Center (NOLITC)
- Our Lady of Mercy College – Bacolod
- Riverside College, Inc.
- Sacred Heart Seminary and Shrine - Bacolod
- St. Scholastica's Academy - Bacolod
- Southland College
- Tañon College
- VMA Global College

== Media ==
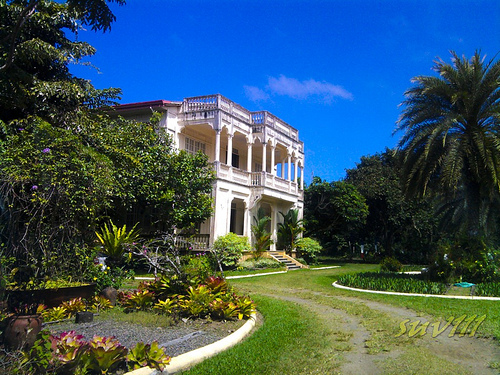
Hacienda Rosalia, setting for the 1981 film Oro, Plata, Mata.

Modern communication facilities, as well as radio, television and newspapers, are available in the province. Most are provided by dominant national players in the industry like PLDT, Globe Telecom and their subsidiaries. For television and radio, the major providers are network giants ABS-CBN, GMA Network, TV5, RPN and IBC. Cable TV provides access to BBC, ESPN and other international programs. National and international newspapers are available on the same day of issue in Manila.

Bacolod is noted for being the home of the Negros Summer Workshops, founded by multi-award-winning filmmaker and Negrense Peque Gallaga. Founded in 1991, Workshops has long been training students from different parts of the country who wish to learn courses in film-making, acting, writing, and more. Some of its alumni include actors in mainstream Philippine show business.

Negros Occidental has also been used as a setting and location shoot for various films and television shows, most notable of which is the 1981 epic Oro, Plata, Mata where Hacienda Rosalia is the setting. Recent films that were set and filmed in Negros are Ligaw Liham (2007), Namets! (2008), and Everyday I Love You (2015).

There is one regional newscast program in Bacolod like One Western Visayas (GMA Bacolod, simulcasting from GMA Iloilo) but the former regional newscast TV Patrol Negros (ABS-CBN Bacolod) went off the air on August 28, 2020 during its last broadcast.

== See also ==
- Capitol Park and Lagoon
- Diocese of Bacolod
- Diocese of Kabankalan
- Diocese of San Carlos (Philippines)
- Northern Negros Natural Park
