= List of Cultural Properties of the Philippines in Negros =

This list contains an overview of the government recognized Cultural Properties of the Philippines in Negros. The list is based on the official lists provided by the National Commission on Culture and the Arts, National Historical Commission of the Philippines and the National Museum of the Philippines.

Cultural Property wmph identifier (Note: wmph is an internal identifier used by Wikimedia Philippines to identify the monument. This is not an official identifier, and only shown temporarily in the templates until the government creates an updated complete list.)	Site name	Description	Province	City or municipality	Address	Coordinates	Image
PH-06-0033	Negros Occidental Provincial Capitol		Negros Occidental	Bacolod			More images
PH-06-0034	General Juan Araneta Shrine		Negros Occidental	Bago			Upload file
PH-06-0035	Alejandro Amechazura Heritage House		Negros Occidental	Silay			Upload Photo
PH-06-0036	Amelia Hilado Flores Heritage House		Negros Occidental	Silay			Upload Photo
PH-06-0037	Angel Araneta Ledesma Heritage House		Negros Occidental	Silay			Upload Photo
PH-06-0038	Augusto Hilado Severino Heritage House		Negros Occidental	Silay			Upload Photo
PH-06-0039	Benita Jara Heritage House		Negros Occidental	Silay			Upload file
PH-06-0040	Bernardino Lopez Jalandoni Ancestral House		Negros Occidental	Silay	Rizal St., Silay City	10°48′07″N 122°58′38″E	Upload file
PH-06-0041	Carlos Arceo Ledesma Heritage House		Negros Occidental	Silay			Upload Photo
PH-06-0042	Claudio Hilado Akol Heritage House		Negros Occidental	Silay			Upload Photo
PH-06-0043	Delfin Ledesma Ledesma Heritage House		Negros Occidental	Silay			Upload Photo
PH-06-0044	Digna Locsin Consing Heritage House		Negros Occidental	Silay			Upload file
PH-06-0045	Dr. Jose Corteza Locsin Heritage House		Negros Occidental	Silay			Upload file
PH-06-0046	Felix Tad-y Lacson Heritage House		Negros Occidental	Silay			Upload Photo
PH-06-0047	Generoso Reyes Gamboa Heritage House		Negros Occidental	Silay			Upload file
PH-06-0048	German Lacson Gaston Heritage House		Negros Occidental	Silay			Upload Photo
PH-06-0049	German Locsin Unson Heritage House		Negros Occidental	Silay			Upload Photo
PH-06-0050	Jose Benedicto Gamboa Heritage House		Negros Occidental	Silay			Upload Photo
PH-06-0051	Jose Corteza Locsin Heritage House		Negros Occidental	Silay			Upload file
PH-06-0052	Jose Ledesma Heritage House		Negros Occidental	Silay			Upload file
PH-06-0053	Kapitan Marciano Montelibano Lacson Heritage House		Negros Occidental	Silay			Upload file
PH-06-0054	Manuel de la Rama Locsin Heritage House		Negros Occidental	Silay			Upload file
PH-06-0055	Manuel Severino Hofileña Heritage House		Negros Occidental	Silay		10°48′08″N 122°58′27″E	Upload file
PH-06-0056	Maria Ledesma Golez Heritage House		Negros Occidental	Silay			Upload file
PH-06-0057	Modesto Ramirez Hojilla (Carlos Javelosa Jalandoni) Heritage House		Negros Occidental	Silay			Upload file
PH-06-0058	Severino Building Heritage House		Negros Occidental	Silay			Upload Photo
PH-06-0059	Silay City Historic Center		Negros Occidental	Silay			Upload Photo
PH-06-0060	Soledad and Maria Montelibano Lacson Heritage House		Negros Occidental	Silay			Upload file
PH-06-0061	Teodoro Morada Heritage House		Negros Occidental	Silay			Upload file
PH-06-0062	Vicente Conlu Montelibano Heritage House		Negros Occidental	Silay			Upload file
PH-06-0063	Victor Fernandez Gaston Heritage House	Ancestral house, now a museum	Negros Occidental	Silay	Cinco de Noviembre - Zulueta Sts.	10°47′58″N 122°58′24″E	More images
PH-06-0064	Rizal Elementary School Building		Negros Occidental	Bacolod			Upload file
PH-06-0065	Bacolod Cathedral	Late 19th-century church	Negros Occidental	Bacolod	Rizal Street	10°40′12″N 122°56′49″E	Upload file
PH-06-0066	Negros Occidental High School		Negros Occidental	Bacolod			Upload file
PH-06-0067	Infante Heritage House		Negros Occidental	La Carlota		10°25′36″N 122°55′18″E	Upload Photo
PH-06-0068	La Carlota Church		Negros Occidental	La Carlota		10°25′33″N 122°55′18″E	More images
PH-06-0069	La Granja Agricola		Negros Occidental	La Carlota			Upload Photo
PH-06-0070	Muscovado Sugar Mills		Negros Occidental	La Carlota			Upload file
PH-06-0071	Central Azucarera De La Carlota		Negros Occidental	La Carlota		10°25′02″N 122°55′00″E	Upload file
PH-06-0072	Ishiwata Bath House		Negros Occidental	Murcia	Mambukal Road	10°30′44″N 123°06′13″E	Upload file
PH-06-0073	Tana Dicang House		Negros Occidental	Talisay		10°44′09″N 122°57′56″E	Upload file
PH-07-0049	Silliman University		Negros Oriental	Dumaguete	Hibbard Avenue		Upload file
PH-07-0050	Sisters of St. Paul of Chartres		Negros Oriental	Dumaguete			Upload Photo
PH-07-0051	Bacong Church		Negros Oriental	Bacong		9°14′45″N 123°17′45″E	More images

== See also ==
- List of historical markers of the Philippines in Negros
- List of Cultural Properties of the Philippines in the Negros Island Region
