= List of universities and colleges in Iloilo =

The following is the complete list of private and government-owned universities and colleges in Iloilo City and Iloilo province, Philippines as of October 23, 2009:

== A ==
- ABE International College of Business and Economics-Iloilo - Mabini St., Iloilo City Proper
- ACSI College Iloilo (Formerly: ACSI Business and Computer School) - JM Basa St., Iloilo City Proper
- AMA Computer College-Iloilo - Rizal St., Iloilo City Proper
- ABBA Institutes of technology
- Asian College of Aeronautics - Sambag, Jaro, Iloilo City

== C ==
- Cabalum Western College - Dr. Fermin Caram Sr. Avenue, Iloilo City Proper
- Central Philippine University - Lopez Jaena St., Jaro, Iloilo City
- Colegio de San Jose - E. Lopez St., Jaro, Iloilo City
- Colegio del Sagrado Corazon de Jesus - General Hughes St., Iloilo City Proper
- Computer College of the Visayas – Mabini St., Iloilo City Proper

== D ==
- De Paul College - E. Lopez St., Jaro, Iloilo City
- Dominican College of Iloilo - Aldeguer St., Iloilo City Proper

== F ==
- FAST Aviation Academy Inc. - Iloilo (School of Aeronautics)- Rizal St., Jaro, Iloilo City

== G ==
- Gov. Angel Medina Foundation College - Panes, Passi City, Iloilo
- Great Saviour College - Luna St., La Paz, Iloilo City

== I ==
- Iloilo City Community College - M.H del Pilar St., Molo, Iloilo City
- Iloilo Doctors' College - West Avenue, Molo, Iloilo City
- Iloilo Doctors' College of Medicine - West Avenue, Molo, Iloilo City
- Iloilo Science and Technology University
  - Main Campus - La Paz, Iloilo City
  - Barotac Nuevo Campus - Barotac Nuevo, Iloilo
  - Dumangas Campus - Dumangas, Iloilo
  - Leon Campus - Leon, Iloilo
  - Miagao Campus - Miagao, Iloilo
- Iloilo State University of Fisheries Science and Technology
  - Main Campus - Barotac Nuevo, Iloilo
  - Barotac Nuevo Campus - Barotac Nuevo, Iloilo
  - Dingle Campus - Dingle, Iloilo
  - Dumangas Campus - Dumangas, Iloilo
  - San Enrique Campus - San Enrique, Iloilo
- Iloilo State University of Science and Technology - Barotac Nuevo, Iloilo
- Integrated Midwives Association of the Philippines Foundation School of Midwifery - La Paz, Iloilo City
- Interface Computer College-Iloilo - Mabini St., Iloilo City Proper

== J ==
- John B. Lacson Foundation Maritime University
  - Arevalo - Sto. Niño Sur, Arevalo, Iloilo City
  - Molo - M.H. Del Pilar St., Molo, Iloilo City

== N ==
- National University Iloilo - SM City Iloilo, Mandurriao, Iloilo City
- New Lucena Polytechnic College - New Lucena, Iloilo
- Northern Iloilo State University formerly Northern Iloilo Polytechnic State College
  - Barotac Viejo Campus - Barotac Viejo, Iloilo
  - Ajuy Campus - Ajuy, Iloilo
  - Batad Campus - Batad, Iloilo
  - Concepcion Campus - Concepcion, Iloilo
  - Estancia, Iloilo -Main Campus Estancia, Iloilo
  - Lemery Campus - Lemery, Lemery, Iloilo
  - Victorino Salcedo Polytechnic College - Sara, Iloilo

== P ==
- Passi City College - Passi City, Iloilo
- Pius XII College Iloilo - Jaro, Iloilo City

== S ==
- St. Anne College of Iloilo - Molo, Iloilo City
- St. Paul University Iloilo - Iloilo City Proper
- St. Therese-MTC College
  - Magdalo (Main)- La Paz, Iloilo City
  - La Fiesta - Molo, Iloilo City
  - Tigbauan - Tigbauan, Iloilo
- St. Vincent College of Business and Accountancy - Pototan, Iloilo
- St. Vincent College of Science and Technology - Leganes, Iloilo
- St. Vincent Ferrer Seminary - Jaro, Iloilo City
- STI College-Iloilo - Cor. Gen. Luna-Iznart Sts., Iloilo City Proper
- Santa Isabel College of Iloilo City, San Jose St., Jaro, Iloilo City

== U ==
- University of Iloilo – PHINMA - Iloilo City Proper
- University of San Agustin
  - Main Campus - Gen. Luna St., Iloilo City Proper
  - Satellite Campus - Sambag, Jaro, Iloilo City
- University of St. La Salle - Pavia
- University of the Philippines Visayas
  - Main Campus - Miagao, Iloilo
  - Iloilo City Campus - Iloilo City Proper

== W ==
- West Visayas State University
  - Main Campus - La Paz, Iloilo City
  - Calinog Campus - Calinog, Iloilo
  - Janiuay Campus - Janiuay, Iloilo
  - Lambunao Campus - Lambunao, Iloilo
  - Pototan Campus - Pototan, Iloilo
- Western Institute of Technology - Luna, La Paz, Iloilo City
