= Jalandoni =

Jalandoni is a surname occurring in the Philippines. Notable people with the surname include:

- Luis Jalandoni (1935–2025), Filipino-Dutch priest and rebel
- Magdalena Jalandoni (1891–1978), Filipino writer, poet, and artist
- Rafael Jalandoni (1894–1949), Philippine Army general

== See also ==
- Bernardino Jalandoni Museum, a historic house museum in the Philippines
