= List of historical markers of the Philippines in the Negros Island Region =

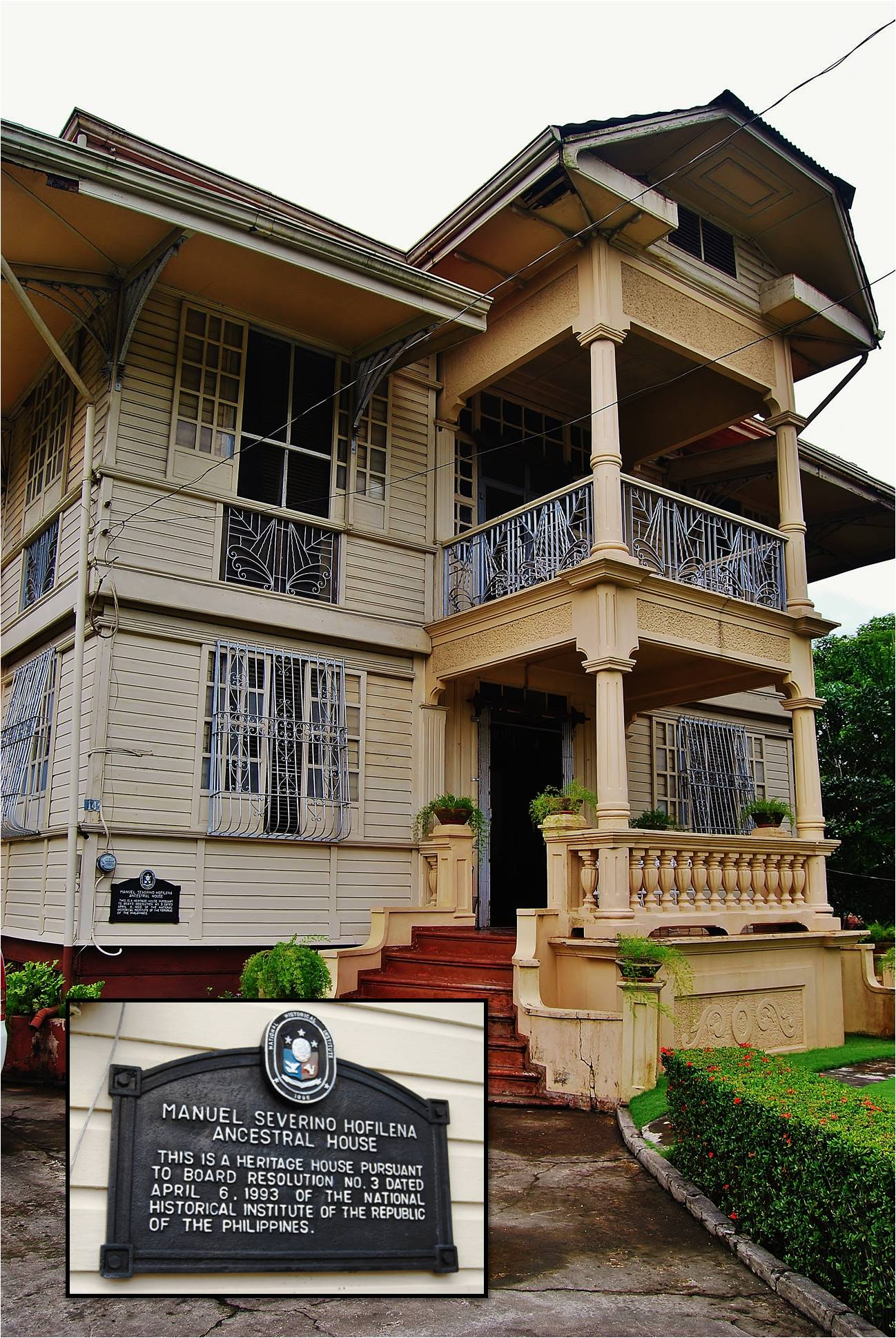
Manuel Severino Hofileña Heritage House and marker, Silay City

This list of historical markers installed by the National Historical Commission of the Philippines (NHCP) in the Negros Island Region is an annotated list of people, places, or events in the region that have been commemorated by cast-iron plaques issued by the said commission. The plaques themselves are permanent signs installed in publicly visible locations on buildings, monuments, or in special locations.

While many Cultural Properties have historical markers installed, not all places marked with historical markers are designated into one of the particular categories of Cultural Properties.

This article lists 62 markers from the Negros Island Region, including one that is part of the Quincentennial historical markers series.

== Negros Occidental ==
This table lists 48 markers from the province of Negros Occidental.

Marker title	Description	Location	Language	Date issued	Image
Alejandro Amechazurra Ancestral House	Declared as a heritage house by the NHCP.	Silay City	English	July 29, 2006	
Amelia Hilado Flores Ancestral House	Declared as a heritage house by the NHCP.	Silay City	English	November 5, 2015	
Angel Araneta Ledesma Ancestral House	Declared as a heritage house by the NHCP.	Rizal St., Silay City	English	November 5, 2015	
Benita Jara Ancestral House	Declared as a heritage house by the NHCP.	Rizal St., Silay City	English	November 5, 2015	
Bernardino-Ysabela Jalandoni Ancestral House	Declared as a heritage house by the NHCP.	Silay City	English	1993	
Binalbagan	Town established by the Spaniards on May 15, 1572. Site of the first parish in Negros.	Binalbagan	Filipino	May 15, 1972	
Cathedral of Bacolod	Cornerstone laid in 1876. Inaugurated on January 20, 1882.	Bacolod City	English	1936	
Cathedral of Bacolod	Cornerstone laid April 27, 1876. Msgr. Casimiro M. Lladoc, D.D. served as first bishop from 1933 to 1951.	Bacolod City	English	1952	
Central Azucarera de La Carlota	One of the first sugar central in the Philippines. Established in the Hacienda Esperanza in 1916.	CADP Co. Corp. Grounds, La Carlota City	Filipino	September 22, 2003	
Cesar Lacson Locsin Heritage House	Declared as a heritage house by the NHCP.	Silay City	English	1995	
Claudio Hilado Akol Heritage House	Declared as a heritage house by the NHCP.	Silay City	English		
Corazon Locsin Montelibano Memorial Regional Hospital	Established in 1925 as Occidental Negros Provincial Hospital.	Bacolod City	Filipino	May 30, 2012	
Delfin Ledesma Ledesma Ancestral House	Declared as a heritage house by the NHCP.	Silay City	English	November 5, 2015	
Digna Locsin Consing Ancestral House	Declared as a heritage house by the NHCP.	Silay City	English	November 5, 2015	
Dionisio Magbuelas "Papa Isio"	Religious leader who became a revolutionary against the Spanish and American colonialists.	Isabela	Filipino	November 2009	
Generoso Reyes Gamboa Ancestral House	Declared as a heritage house by the NHCP.	Zamora St. cor. Cinco de Noviembre St., Silay City	English	November 5, 2015	
German Lacson Gaston Ancestral House	Declared as a heritage house by the NHCP.	Cinco de Noviembre St., Silay City	English	November 5, 2015	
German Locsin Unson Ancestral House	Declared as a heritage house by the NHCP.	Cinco de Noviembre St., Silay City	English	November 5, 2015	
Gusali ng Mababang Paaralan ng Rizal (Note: Rizal Elementary School Building)	Oldest school building in Negros Occidental. Built in 1907 for the Rizal Institute.	Bacolod City	Filipino	1990	
Infante Heritage House	Declared as a heritage house by the NHCP.	Hacienda Guadalupe, La Carlota	English	December 12, 2001	
Ishiwata Bath House	Designed by Kokichi Paul Ishiwata as part of the Mambukal Resort. Built in 1927.	Mambukal Mountain Resort, Murcia	Filipino	April 29, 2006	
Jorge B. Vargas (1890–1980)	Became one of the founders of the Boy Scouts of the Philippines.	Bago City	Filipino	August 24, 1987	
Jose Benedicto Gamboa Ancestral House	Declared as a heritage house by the NHCP.	Gomez cor Zamora St., Silay City	English	November 5, 2015	
Jose Corteza Locsin Heritage House	Declared as a heritage house by the NHCP.	Silay City	English	1995	
Jose "Pitong" Ledesma Heritage House	Declared as a heritage house by the NHCP.	Silay City	English	July 29, 2006	
Juan Anacleto Araneta (1852–1954)	Revolutionary leader who established the Republic of Negros and the liberator of Negros.	Balay ni Tan Juan, Bago City	Filipino	September 27, 1968	
Juan Torres Araneta		Bago City			
Kapitan Marciano Lacson Heritage House	Declared as a heritage house by the NHCP.	Silay City	English	July 29, 2006	
Kapitolyo ng Negros Occidental (Note: Capitol of Negros Occidental)	Building constructed from 1927 to 1933. Was first housed in the old house of Jose Ruiz de Luzurriaga.	Bacolod City	English	November 5, 2004	
La Granja Agricola (Note: The Agricultural Farm)	Established on November 15, 1881. Became La Granja Agricultural Research and Development Center.	La Granja Agricultural Research and Extension Center, La Carlota - La Castellana Rd., Brgy. La Granja, La Carlota City	Filipino	April 22, 2003	
Manuel de la Rama Locsin Ancestral House	Declared as a heritage house by the NHCP.	Silay City	English	1995	
Manuel Severino Hofileña Heritage House	Declared as a heritage house by the NHCP.	Silay City	English	1995	
Marciano Araneta y Soriano	Revolutionary leader, one of the ones who established a cantonal government in Negros.	La Carlota Municipal Building, La Carlota	Filipino	March 25, 1993	
Maria Ledesma Golez Ancestral House	Declared a Heritage House in 1993.	Rizal Street cor. Burgos Street, Silay	English	1995	
Muscovado Sugar Mills	Built in 1910 by the families of Ledesma and Locsin of La Carlota.	La Carlota	Filipino	September 5, 2003	
Negros Occidental High School	Known as the oldest public high school in the province. Established as Instituto Rizal in 1902.	Bacolod City	Filipino	April 19, 2002	
Pagdaong sa Pulupandan (Note: Landing at Pulupandan)	Commemorating the arrival of American forces, March 29, 1945	Pulupandan	Filipino	2006	
Ang Pambansang Palatandaang Aniceto Lacson (Note: The Aniceto Lacson National Landmark)	Built by Aniceto L. Lacson as part of Hacienda Matab-ang. Became the leader of the revolutionary forces in Negros.	Talisay	Filipino	July 26, 2003	
Pascual V. Ledesma (1843–1917)	Revolutionary leader. One of the founders of the Nacionalista Party.	Himamaylan	Filipino	May 17, 1993	
Pook ng Pagsuko ng mga Puwersang Espanyol sa Negros Occidental (Note: Site Where the Spanish Forces Surrendered in Negros Occidental)	Old site of the house of Don Jose Luiz Luzurriaga, where Aniceto Lacson and Juan Araneta accepted the surrender of the Spaniards.	Bacolod City	Filipino	2007	
Republica de Negros	Short-lived revolutionary republic carved after the end of Spanish rule in Negros.	Bago City	English	1952	
Severino Building	Declared as a heritage house by the NHCP.	Rizal St., Silay City	English	November 5, 2015	
The Signing of the Terms of Capitulation	Site where the Spaniards ended their rule in Negros. Aniceto Lacson, Juan Araneta, Jose Montilla, and Simeon Lizares accepted the terms.	Luzurriaga Residence, Bacolod City	English		
Ang Simbahan ng La Carlota (Note: The Church of La Carlota)	Started as a chapel in 1870 built out of bamboo and cogon. Current church was finished in 1877.	La Carlota	Filipino	December 12, 2001	
Soledad and Maria Montelibano Lacson Ancestral House	Declared as a heritage house by the NHCP.	Rizal St., Silay City	English	November 5, 2015	
Teodoro Morada Ancestral House	Declared as a heritage house by the NHCP.	4 Cinco de Noviembre St., Silay City	English	November 5, 2015	
Vicente Conlu Montelibano Ancestral House	Declared as a heritage house by the NHCP.	Silay City	English	1995	
Victor Fernandez Gaston Ancestral House	Declared as a heritage house by the NHCP.	Silay City	English	1994	

== Negros Oriental ==
This table lists 12 markers from the province of Negros Oriental.

Marker title	Description	Location	Language	Date issued	Image
Diego de la Viña	Revolutionary leader and merchant. Helped liberate towns of northern Negros and Dumaguete.	Guihulngan	Filipino	2008	
Negros Oriental State University	Established in 1907 as a class of woodwork within Negros Oriental Provincial High School. Became a university in 2004.	Dumaguete	Filipino	February 14, 2014	
Jose Rizal sa Dumaguete (Note: Jose Rizal in Dumaguete)	Site where José Rizal stayed for a while after his exile in Dapitan. He was with Josephine Bracken, his sister Narcisa, among others.	Dumaguete	Filipino	February 7, 2012	
Kapitolyo ng Negros Oriental (Note: Capitol of Negros Oriental)	Constructed under architect Tomás Mapúa, 1923–1924.	Dumaguete	Filipino	May 17, 2024	
Panilongon (Negros); Ruta ng Ekspedisyong Magallanes–Elcano sa Pilipinas (Note: Panilongon (Negros): Route of the Magellan–Elcano Expedition in the Philippines)	Noted by Francisco Albo, one of the pilots of the expedition that this place was rich in gold and ginger.	Rizal Boulevard, Dumaguete	Filipino	May 4, 2021	
Pantaleon Villegas "Leon Kilat" (1873–1898)	Became part of the revolutionary cause while in Manila and was tasked by Aguinaldo to expand the revolution in Cebu.	Bacong	Filipino	2000	
Silliman University	The first American and Protestant school in the Philippines and in Asia.	Dumaguete City	English	1966	
Silliman University	University was declared as a National Historical Landmark.	Dumaguete City	Filipino	September 23, 2022	
Simbahan ng Dauin (Note: Church of Dauin)	Established by the seculars. Current stone façade built from 1857 to 1864.	Dauin Church façade, Dauin	Filipino	August 29, 2019	
Simbahan ng Zamboanguita (Note: Church of Zamboanguita)	Established by Augustinian Recollects as a visita of Dauin, 1850.	Zamboanguita Church façade, Zamboanguita	Filipino	August 29, 2019	
Ang Pagdaong ng USS Crevalle (Note: The Landing of the USS Crevalle)	Site of the landing of US Submarine USS Crevalle on May 11, 1944.	Basay	Filipino	September 21, 2022	
Ang Pagsuko ng mga Puwersang Hapones sa Negros Oriental (Note: The Surrender of Japanese Forces in Negros Oriental)	Commemorating the site where Japanese forces under Col. Satoshi Oie surrendered to the American forces under Col. F. Wilson.	Guinsuan Bridge, Km. 26 National Highway, Brgy. Basak, Zamboanguita	Filipino	September 22, 2007	
Sisters of St. Paul of Chartres	Commemorating the arrival of Sisters of St. Paul of Chartres to Dumaguete.	Dumaguete City	Filipino	October 28, 2004	

== Siquijor ==
This table lists two markers from the province of Siquijor.

Marker title	Description	Location	Language	Date issued	Image
Simbahan ng Lazi (Note: Church of Lazi)	Parish established by the Recollects in 1857. Has one of the largest convents in the Philippines.	Lazi	Filipino	May 19, 1984	
Simbahan ng Siquijor (Note: Church of Siquijor)	Established under the patronage of Saint Francis de Assisi, February 1, 1783.	Siquijor	Filipino	May 19, 1984	

== Bibliography ==
- National Historical Institute (1994). Historical Markers: Regions V-XIII. National Historical Institute.
- National Historical Institute (2008). Historical Markers (1992 - 2006). National Historical Institute.
- A list of sites and structures with historical markers, as of 16 January 2012
- A list of institutions with historical markers, as of 16 January 2012
