= Banilad =

Banilad may refer to any of the following barangays in the Philippines:

- Banilad, Bacong, Negros Oriental
- Banilad, Cebu City
- Banilad, Dumaguete, Negros Oriental
- Banilad, Mandaue
- Banilad, Majayjay, Laguna
- Banilad, Nagcarlan, Laguna
- Banilad, Nasugbu, Batangas
- Banilad, Pinamalayan, Oriental Mindoro
- Banilad, Tayabas, Quezon
