= Colegio de San Jose =

Roman Catholic college in Iloilo City, Philippines

- Motto: Ite ad Joseph (Latin)
- Motto in English: Go to Joseph
- Type: Private Catholic Coeducational Basic and Higher education institution
- Established: 1872; 154 years ago
- Founder: Daughters of Charity of Saint Vincent de Paul
- Religious affiliation: Roman Catholic (Daughters of Charity)
- Academic affiliations: PAASCU
- President: Sr. Zenaida S. Condes, Daughters of Charity
- Location: E. Lopez St., Brgy. Our Lady of Fatima, Jaro, Iloilo City, Philippines; 10°43′15″N 122°33′36″E
- Colors: Green and Yellow
- Website: www.csj.edu.ph

Colegio de San Jose, also referred to by its acronym CSJ, is a higher education institution in Iloilo City in the Philippines. It is run by the Sisters of Charity of Saint Vincent De Paul in Jaro, Iloilo City, Philippines. It was established on July 9, 1871, and is the first Catholic Convent School for girls in Western Visayas.

== History ==
=== Founding ===
Colegio de San Jose had its beginning in 1872. Vincentian priest Fr. Ildefonso Moral, rector of the Jaro Archdiocesan Seminary, and Recardo Mascuñana signed the contract of its establishment on July 9, 1871.

On May 1, 1872, the Daughters of Charity opened a school to provide Christian education for girls. In 1877, they decided to give up the school for lack of resources. Bishop Mariano Cuartero of Jaro realized the need for the teaching and the catechetical services of the Sisters. So he gave them full charge of the Escuela Municipal, a free school for the poor, located at Sta. Isabel and Lopez Jaena Streets.

In 1881, another storey was added to the nuns' quarters in response to the urgent request of the parents. A dormitory for girls and a chapel were inaugurated by Leandro Arrue, Bishop of Jaro.

In 1892, Domingo Viera and the Mother Superior of the Daughters of Charity, Juana Goita, conceived the plan of constructing a college managed and owned by the Daughters of Charity. The Sisters were to continue managing the Escuela Municipal.

With the help of the higher Superiors and new loyal benefactors, the work immediately started. The site was located at East Lopez Street. Manuel Uytiepo aided the sisters in finishing the building. In spite of the interruption of the Revolution of 1896, the new Colegio de San Jose was inaugurated on March 19, 1896.

Along with the reconstruction of the building was the organization of the administration, re-examination of the education objectives, and adoption of new methods to suit the needs of the students. The curriculum included Reading, History, Writing, Arithmetic, Spanish Grammar, Practical Arts, and Religious and Moral Training. The emphasis was Christian formation and Christian manners and right conduct.

On September 14, 1917, five of the Sisters from Colegio de San Jose started the Colegio del Sagrado Corazon de Jesus in Iloilo City proper.

In 1926, the college was allowed to grant high school diplomas. Later on, it offered college courses like Music, Teacher Education, Secretarial and Commerce. Colegio de San Jose, the oldest school for girls in Western Visayas, had a complete library, a school of music, plus complete courses from pre-elementary to college.

=== Fire and new building ===
On August 30, 1958, the school was razed by fire of undetermined origin. The Viritas, local newspaper, quoted that the burning of Colegio de San Jose was both material and historic loss to Iloilo. The history of the education and cultural works of the Daughters of charity of St. Vincent de Paul was destroyed.

In the early 1950s, the Escuela Municipal became a free school serving as a laboratory for the in-campus practice teaching of normal education students. It functioned and even flourished after the fire of 1958 the building having withstood the fire.

Church and government officials, heads of schools, superiors of the congregation like Ana Cassassas and Hermenegilda Beroiz and Zacariaz Zubinas, the whole Daughters of Charity province, lay benefactors and alumni all over the country, contributed to the rebuilding of the new college building. The new building was blessed by Jose Ma. Cuenco, Archbishop of Jaro on November 27, 1959.

After Ines Peña reconstructed the college and put things in order, Tarsila Palermo took over the management. During her term she also had the supervision of the opening of the Marillac Academy in Miag-ao, a sister institution of Colegio de San Jose. Concepcion Gotera who succeeded Palermo, carried on with the preparation of the school, until on September 6, 1969, it was officially opened. Then Ines Peña took over, followed by Soledad Torre.

March 1979 marked a new thrust in the administration of CSJ and other D.C. schools. A new vision systematized the management, supervision and administration of all D.C. schools was adopted. The Catholic School System Development Program was integrated in the Daughters of Charity Mission Statement.

School year 1981–82 saw Colegio de San Jose making a forward thrust by opting for PAASCU accreditation. While the Basic Education Department had undergone and passed the Preliminary and Formal Survey, the College Department, in coordination with the faculty, students, personnel, parents, alumni and community launched the PAASCU Preliminary Survey on January 19–20, 1987. School year 2024–25 saw Colegio de San Jose making another PAASCU accreditation and is advancing to level 3.
