= Leandro Arrúe Agudo =

Spanish Catholic prelate

His Excellency Leandro Arrúe Agudo O.A.R.
- Bishop of Jaro
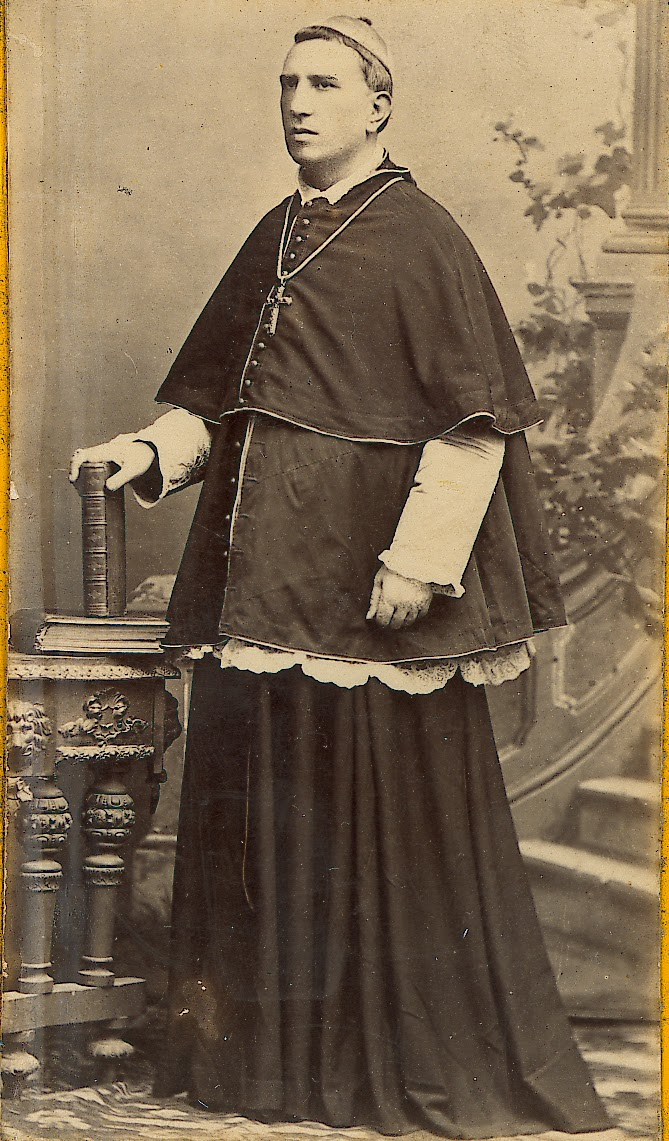
- Appointed: 27 March 1885
- Predecessor: Mariano Cuartero y Medina, O. P.
- Successor: Andrés Ferrero y Malo de San José, O.A.R.
- Previous posts: Parish Priest of Bacong; Parish Administrator of Sum-ag; Parish Priest of Liloan, Cebu; Procurator General of the Recoletos in Intramuros; Prior of the Immaculate Conception Convent in Cebu; Prior Provincial ad triennium (1879-1882).

Orders
- Ordination: 22 September 1860
- Consecration: 30 August 1885 by: Consecrator: Archbishop Pedro Payo y Piñeiro, O.P., Archbishop of Manila; Co-consecrators: Mariano Cuartero y Sierra, O.A.R., Bishop of Nueva Segovia; Bernabé García Cezón, O.P., Titular Bishop of Byblus and Vicar Apostolic of Central Tonking and Vietnam

Personal details
- Born: Leandro Arrúe Agudo; January 13, 1837 Calatayud, Zaragoza, Spain
- Died: October 24, 1897 (aged 60) Jaro, Iloilo, Captaincy General of the Philippines
- Denomination: Roman Catholic

Styles of Leandro Arrué Agudo, O.A.R.
- Reference style: His Excellency
- Spoken style: Your Excellency
- Religious style: Bishop

Leandro Arrúe Agudo, O.A.R. (born Leandro Arrué de San Nicolás de Tolentino; 1837–1897) was a Spanish Catholic prelate who served as Bishop of Jaro from 1885 until his death. He was born in Calatayud, Zaragoza, Spain, on 13 January 1837 and took vows as an Augustinian Recollect in 1856.

== Ministry in the Philippines ==
Fray Leandro Arrué started his missionary work in the Philippines in July 1860 when he came to Manila. On 22 September 1860, he was ordained a priest of the Augustinian Recollect Order. After his ordination, he was sent to Cagayan de Oro to study the Cebuano language in 1861, and was sent to be the parish priest of Bacong in Negros Island in 1864.

While in Bacong, Fray Leandro built the parish rectory. He also started the construction of the stone church in 1866. From Bacong, he temporarily administered the former town of Sum-ag for some months in 1868, after which, he was appointed parish priest of Liloan, Cebu, in September of that year. He stayed in Liloan until May 1873. His subsequent responsibilities included being procurator general of his order in Manila, and prior of the Immaculate Conception Convent in Cebu.

In 1879, Fray Arrué was also elected to a three-year term as prior provincial of the Augustinian Recollects in the Philippines. Having been much sought after by the people of Bacong, he returned to Negros after serving as the head of the Philippine province of his order. He was able to finish the parish church of Bacong within his second term as curate of the town. The first Mass was celebrated there on 28 August 1883, the Feast of St. Augustine, Bacong's patron saint.

== Ministry as Bishop of Jaro ==
The friar distinguished himself in the work for pastoral care in the Philippines. He was zealous in his ecclesiastical ministry. Pope Leo XIII recognized these qualities of Fray Leandro, when he appointed him Bishop of Jaro, on 27 March 1885. On 30 August of that year, he was consecrated by Pedro Payo y Piñeiro, O.P., Archbishop of Manila, as principal consecrator. The two principal co-consecrators were Mariano Cuartero y Sierra, O.A.R., Bishop of Nueva Segovia; and Bernabé García Cezón, O.P., Titular Bishop of Byblus and Vicar Apostolic of Central Tonking and Vietnam.

This Recollect bishop visited the faithful and clergy of his jurisdiction which, in those days, covered extensives territories comprising the islands of Panay, (now composed of the provinces of Iloilo, Capiz, Antique and Aklan), Guimaras, Negros (now the twin provinces of Negros Occidental and Negros Oriental), Romblon and Palawan, as well as the provinces of Cotabato, Zamboanga, Davao and Sulu in Mindanao. Known for his generosity, unblemished character and great managerial skills, Bishop Arrué took special care of the spiritual and temporal needs of the people of his diocese. He preached in all the churches of his diocese, and also constructed a hospital for the ailing and the destitute.

Bishop Leandro Arrué died 24 October 1897. His remains were buried in the Cathedral Church of St. Elizabeth of Hungary, which is now popularly known as the Jaro Cathedral.

Catholic Church titles
Preceded by Mariano Cuartero y Medina, O. P.	Bishop of Jaro; 27 March 1885 – 24 October 1897	Succeeded by Andrés Ferrero y Malo de San José, O.A.R.
