= León Kilat =

Filipino revolutionary leader (1873-1898)

Pantaleón Villegas
- Born: July 27, 1873; Bacong, Negros Oriental, Captaincy General of the Philippines, Spanish Empire
- Died: April 8, 1898 (aged 24); Carcar, Cebu, Captaincy General of the Philippines, Spanish Empire
- Other names: Eulogio Villegas, León Kilat
- Citizenship: Philippine
- Organization: Katipunan Freemasonry

Eulogio Pantaleón Villegas y Soldevillo (July 27, 1873 – April 8, 1898), better known by his nom-de-guerre León Kilat (literally 'Lightning Lion' in Cebuano), was a Filipino revolutionary leader in Cebu during the Philippine Revolution against the Spanish Empire.

== Biography ==
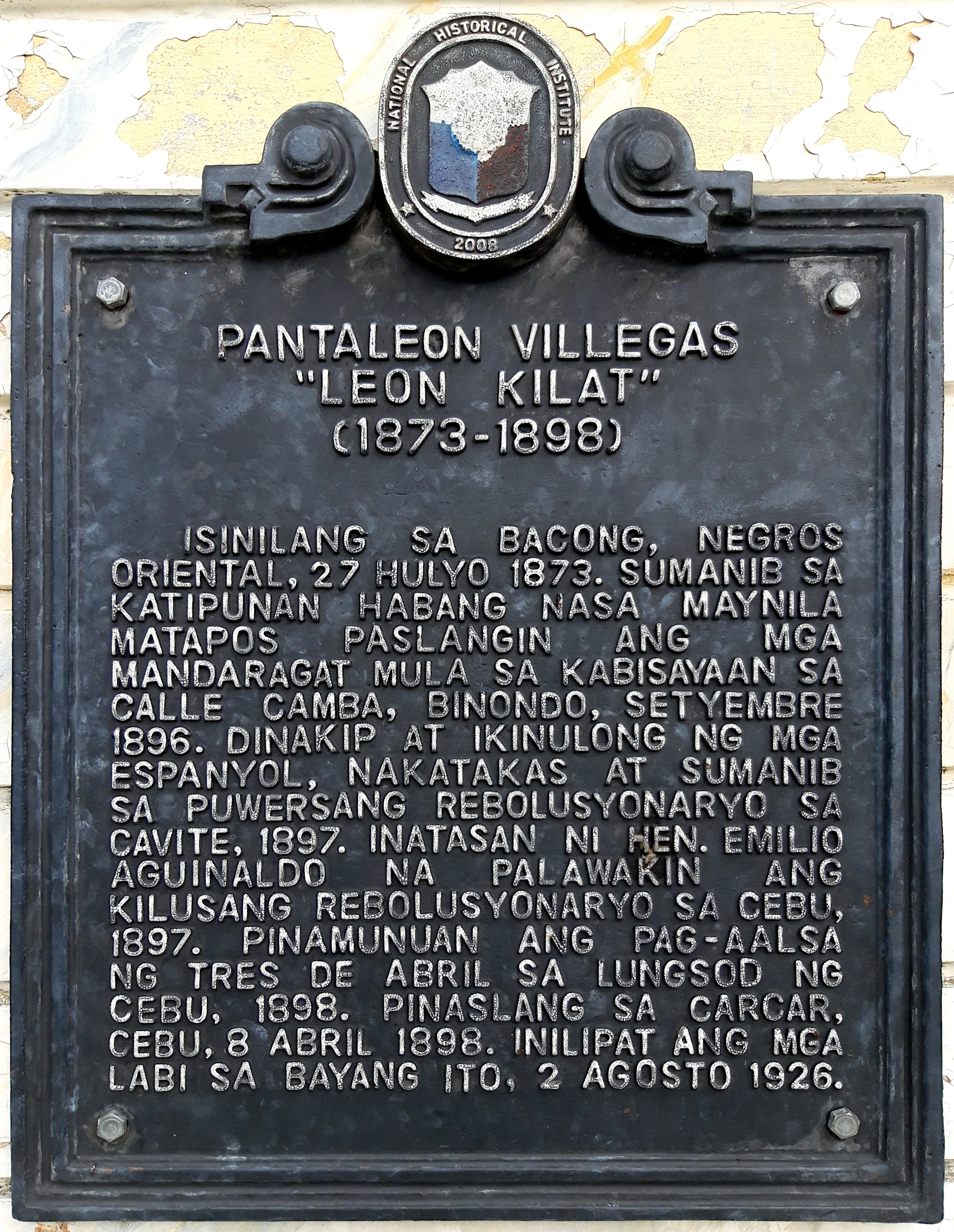
National historical marker installed at the town plaza of his hometown of Bacong

=== Early life ===
Eulogio Pantaleón Villegas y Soldevillo was born on the 27th of July, 1873 in Bacong, Negros Oriental to Don Policarpio Vergara Villegas, the son of Don Pedro Vergara Villegas (a Chinese Mestizo sugar baron who settled in the town of Vallehermoso, Negros Oriental), and Doña Úrsula Soldevillo, the daughter of a wealthy capitan of Bacong. He was the third of the four siblings; Irinea (the eldest), Silvestra, Pantaleón, then Julian. They became orphans when both parents died when they were young. As a young boy, Pantaleón became a sacristan of the parish church and eventually left his hometown for Cebu.

=== Occupation ===
In 1895, Villegas worked at the Botica Antigua located in the corner of Calle del Palacio (today Burgos St.) and Calle Legazpi. It was a well-known drugstore frequented by many townsfolk. With him were Ciriaco Murillo and Eulogio Duque who told the writer Manuel Enríquez de la Calzada that Villegas actually used the name "Eulogio", instead of Pantaleón. Because there were two Eulogios working in the drugstore, the owner decided to call him "León" instead. The reason for him using the name "Eulogio" is not known.

Villegas did not stay long at Botica Antigua. He transferred to a bakery on Calle Página (today Pahina St.). From there he moved on to a circus on its way to Manila. The circus happened to be owned by a katipunero. It was there that he was recruited into the secret society of the Katipunan.

=== Revolutionary Leadership in Cebu ===
During the rebellion against Spain, Villegas led the revolutionaries in Cebu. Initially intending to begin the rebellion on Easter Sunday, he was forced to change his plans when the Spaniards discovered the planned revolt.

==== Battle of Tres de Abril ====
April 3, 1898, Palm Sunday, Villegas and his men began the rebellion in Cebu. On April 4, the rebels drove the Spanish forces into Fort San Pedro and took control of Cebu City. When the Spanish gunboat María Cristina opened fire, the rebels retreated to the Chinese quarter of Lutao. On April 7, 500 men of the 73rd Native Regiment and Spanish cazadores with the cruiser Don Juan de Austria arrived under the command of General Texeiro. This forced the rebels to retreat to San Nicolas. The Spanish continued pursuing the rebels into the mountain region until the next day.

== Death ==
On 8 April 1898, Good Friday, in Carcar, Cebu, Villegas was betrayed and stabbed to death by Captain Florencio Noel, his aide-de-camp Apolinario Alcuitas, and other local townsfolk due to them believing Villegas was endangering the town of Carcar. Before they carry out the act, they sedated him with a drug mixed on his drink and stripped him of his supposed anting-anting. While in the deep state of sleep, all of them took turns stabbing the body, maiming it until it was almost unrecognizable. Then, they dragged it on the floor and one of the perpetrators mashed his head with the butt of a Mauser rifle, severely cracking his skull, to make sure he is dead. His heavily mutilated body was later hung on the town plaza (where his monument in Carcar now stands) for everyone to see.

== In popular culture ==
He was portrayed by Ace Espinosa in 1997 episode of ABS-CBN's Bayani in Episodes "Leon Kilat 1898". The 2023 indie film Ang Dragon Sa Capanganuran (lit. 'The Dragon in the Clouds') includes a fictional depiction of Kilat.
