= Colegio del Sagrado Corazon de Jesus =

Roman Catholic college in Iloilo City, Philippines

- Motto: Amoris Victima (Latin)
- Motto in English: Victims of Love
- Type: Private Catholic Coeducational Basic and Higher education institution
- Established: September 14, 1917; 108 years ago
- Founders: St. Vincent de Paul and St. Louise de Marillac
- Religious affiliation: Roman Catholic (Daughters of Charity)
- Academic affiliations: PAASCU
- President: Sr.Ma. Asuncion G. Evidente DC
- Principal: Prof. Joji Ermel Laurea
- Dean: Prof. Joji Ermel M. Laurea
- Location: Gen.Hughes Street, Iloilo City, Iloilo, Philippines; 10°41′25″N 122°34′31″E
- Alma Mater Song: College Hymn / Himno Plegaria
- Colors: Red and White
- Website: www.cscj.edu.ph
- Location in the Visayas Location in the Philippines

The Colegio del Sagrado Corazon de Jesus (simply referred to as Sagrado and abbreviated as CSCJ), translated in English as College of the Sacred Heart of Jesus, is a private, Catholic, and co-educational institution of learning owned and administered by the Daughters of Charity of St. Vincent de Paul on General Hughes St. Iloilo City, Philippines.

== History ==
School facade

Colegio del Sagrado Corazon de Jesus (CSCJ) was founded when the Daughters of Charity from Colegio de San Jose extended their education services to boys and girls in kindergarten in a rented room in Iznart Street. To this kindergarten school was added the grade school and later the high school. Courses in commerce and economics were offered besides the general academic course in General Hughes Street. On September 14, 1917, "Sagrado", was recognized as a school when the Securities and Exchange Commission approved its by-laws and constitution.

Under the Japanese regime, Sagrado offered grade school and high school programs. The Graduate School in Education started in 1945. The Conservatory of Music, the first south of Manila, opened soon after. Between 1945 and 1975 all the courses offered received recognition from the Department of Education. To these were added courses such as Social Work, Nutrition, and Hotel and Restaurant Management.

The high school department received accreditation in 1975 making it the first DC school to be accredited by PAASCU. The grade school followed suit when in 1979, it obtained PAASCU accreditation making it the first grade school to be accredited in Western Visayas. In 1983, PAASCU nominated Sagrado to be one of the pilot colleges for testing the validity of common standards for accrediting higher education by the Federation of Accrediting Agencies in the Philippines (FAAP), a self-survey using the FAAP Manual of accreditation of these three programs in August 1986.

In 1986, the grade school and high school were merged into the Basic Education Department. Sagrado also turned co-educational by admitting male students in the Basic Education Department and in the College Department. In 1994 the integrated DC school system was implemented in which Colegio del Sagrado Corazon de Jesus and Colegio de San Jose shared one president. In 2003 the St. Louise de Marillac School of Miag-ao was included in the integrated administration.

The school, under the leadership of the Integrated Administration President, Sr. Ma. Lourdes S. Verzosa, D.C. has facilities such as Computer Assisted Instruction, the Multiple Intelligences Approach, Mandarin Education, the Ballet School, Sagrado Alternative Evening School (SAES), and the Villa Sagrado HRM Practicum Center.

Sagrado has presented onstage Dalagang Bukid, The King and I, Flower Drum Song, Beauty and the Beast, Juanita Cruz (which fused film and theatre for the first time on Philippine stage), Aladdin, and The Lion King of Priderock from 2000–2008.

== Courses ==
=== Degree programs ===
- Bachelor of Science in Hospitality Management (BSHM) with majors in Culinary Arts and Kitchen Management (CKM); Food and Beverage Services Management (FBM); Hotel and Resort Management (HRM)

Bachelor of Science in Commerce with majors in Accountancy and Business Management

- Bachelor of Science in Social Work (BSSW)
- Bachelor of Science in Travel Management

=== Sagrado Alternative Evening School ===
- Bachelor of Science in Hospitality Management

=== Basic Education Department ===
- Upper Level-BED: Grades Seven to Ten (high school) (PAASCU accredited)
- Lower Level-BED: Grades One to Six (Elementary) (PAASCU accredited)
- Pre-Elementary: Kinder and Preparatory (Preschool)

== Integrated system ==
In 1994, Sr. Julma C. Neo, DC, then Sister Visitatrix, called for the Sister President and Administrators of CSJ and CSCJ to prepare an experiment to merge both schools under one president. Sr. Josefina R. Quiachon, DC was the first Integrated Administration President. In 1997, the Research and Development Center under the presidency of Sr. Freida P. Benitez, DC, produced a paper specifying the objectives of the integrated administration scheme.

Sr. Ma. Lourdes S. Verzosa, DC, pushed for joint and shared activities, resources (human and material), communication, structures, policies, plans and programs, status and directions. Consultations were held on Integrated Administration, benchmarking initiatives, alternative ways of teaching, evaluation findings and BEC strengthening. The integrated administration of CSJ and CSCJ was expanded by the Provincial Council to include the St. Louise de Marillac School of Miagao (SLMSM) for 2002. In 2003, the sectors of the school held sectoral meetings, to discuss the extent of the integration. As a result, structural changes were proposed giving rise to a new governance structure creating Vice-Presidents for Academics, Religious Education, Community Extension Services, Student Services and Administrative Services for the three member schools.

A summit meeting on the future of the three member schools held in early 2004, gave the SLMES – DC in WV directions and courses of action. Two governing/consultative bodies were created in 2005, the In-House-Servant Leadership Team and the Summit Servant Leadership Team. In the same year, a position for the Integrated Administration Executive Secretary was created.

The Assistant Vice-Presidents for Academics were created for a closer supervision on the curricular and co-curricular programs and activities in the institutional level. In 2007, to have a more focused religious education, the vice-president for Religious Education (RE) was replaced by institutional coordinators for Religious Education. The Vincentian Formation Institute (VFI), a project initiated by the Provincial House of the Daughters of Charity, has trained delegates who are now in their second summer.

== Academic and co-curricular offerings ==
- MI Intensive, special reading classes, computer-assisted instruction, Spoken Mandarin Program
- Religious clubs: Society of St. Vincent de Paul, Children of Mary, Luisas/Luisitas, Knights of the Altar.
- Intelligences clubs: Math Sages Club, CSCJ Young Ecological Society, Homemakers Club, Dance Club, Young Artists Club, Cultural Society Club, Speech Club, Boy Scouts Club, Girl Scouts Club, Computer Club, BED Chorale/ Drum and Bugle Corps.
- The Steering Committee (BED) is composed of all club and class presidents from Grades IV to X. It is responsible for the student governance of the Basic Education Department (BED).
- The Little Voice (BED) is the school publication.
- The Student Executive Council (HED) is the council of the student body for the Higher Education Department (HED).
- The Voice (HED) is the school publication for the Higher Education Department.
- The Community Extension Services (CES) program serves as a bridge for Sagradistas to the less privileged. It offers outreach programs and extension services.

== Achievements ==
- First DC high school to be accredited by PAASCU (1974)
- First grade school to be accredited by PAASCU in Western Visayas (1981)
- First conservatory of music south of Manila
