= Hofileña Ancestral House =

Hofileña Heritage House
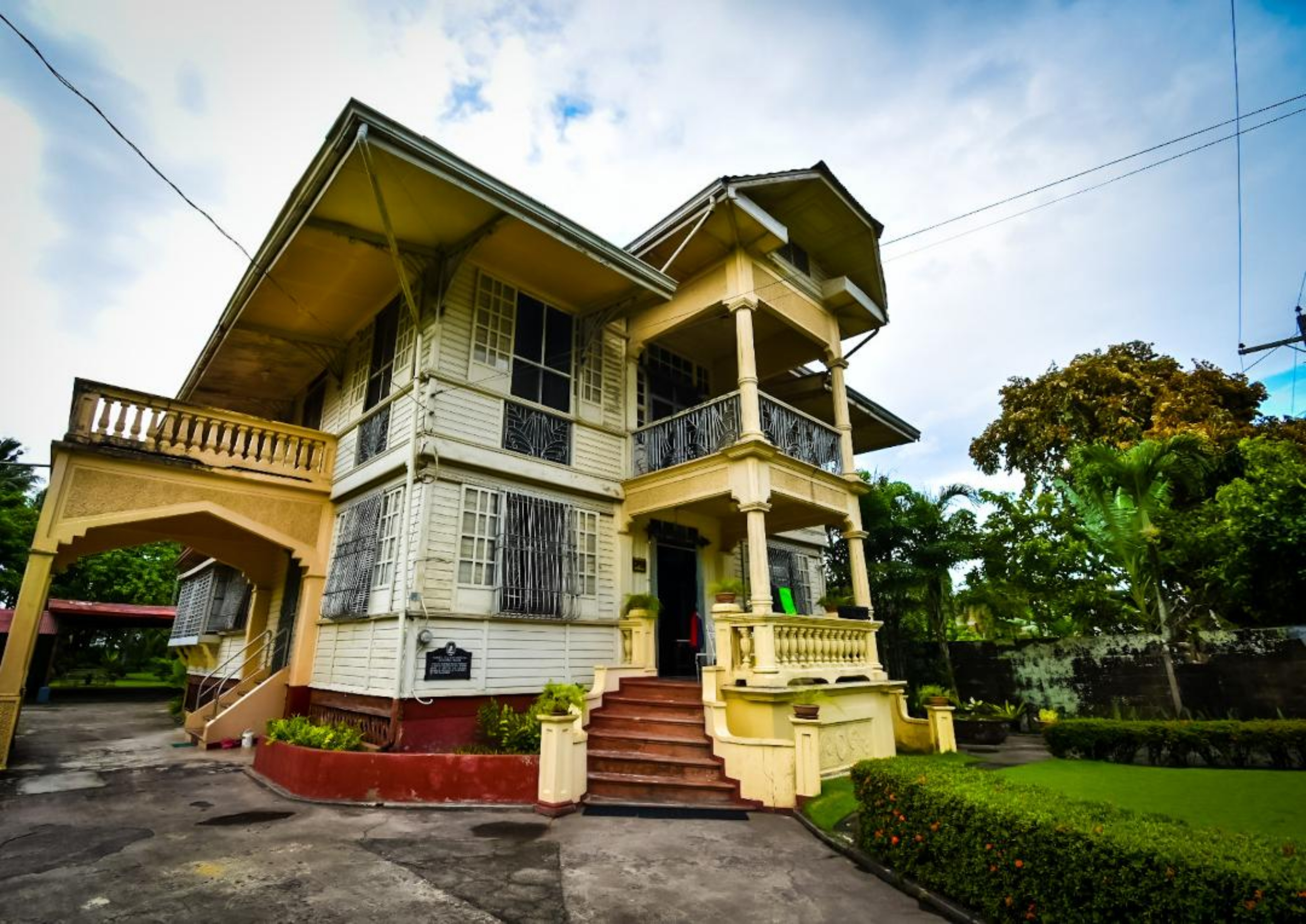
- The facade of the Hofileña Ancestral House

- Location in the Visayas Location in the Philippines
- Established: 1962
- Location: Cinco de Noviembre Street, Silay, Negros Occidental, Philippines
- Coordinates: 10°48′07″N 122°58′27″E
- Type: Lifestyle museum
- Curator: Ramon Hofileña

The Hofileña Ancestral House is the residence of Manuel Severino Hofileña and his family located in Cinco de Noviembre Street, Silay, in the province of Negros Occidental, Philippines. The home was built by Hofileña for his wife Gilda Ledesma Hojilla, a former Miss Silay, and their nine children.

Until recently, Ramon Hofileña, one of the children and heirs, resided in this ancestral house and personally toured guests who visited his abode.

== History ==
Silay's stone houses, or bahay na bato—most of which are owned by landed farmers and sugar barons—are material reminders of the life of the affluent in the late 19th century to the early 20th century, the golden age of Silay and the peak of the sugar industry in the province. One of these houses, the Hofileña Ancestral House, was built in 1934.

During World War II, when the family fled to the mountains, the house was used by Japanese commanders who had meetings here. The house was later occupied by the Americans.

In 1962 the house was opened to the public. It was the first ancestral house to be opened in the city. The next house to do so was 30 years later.

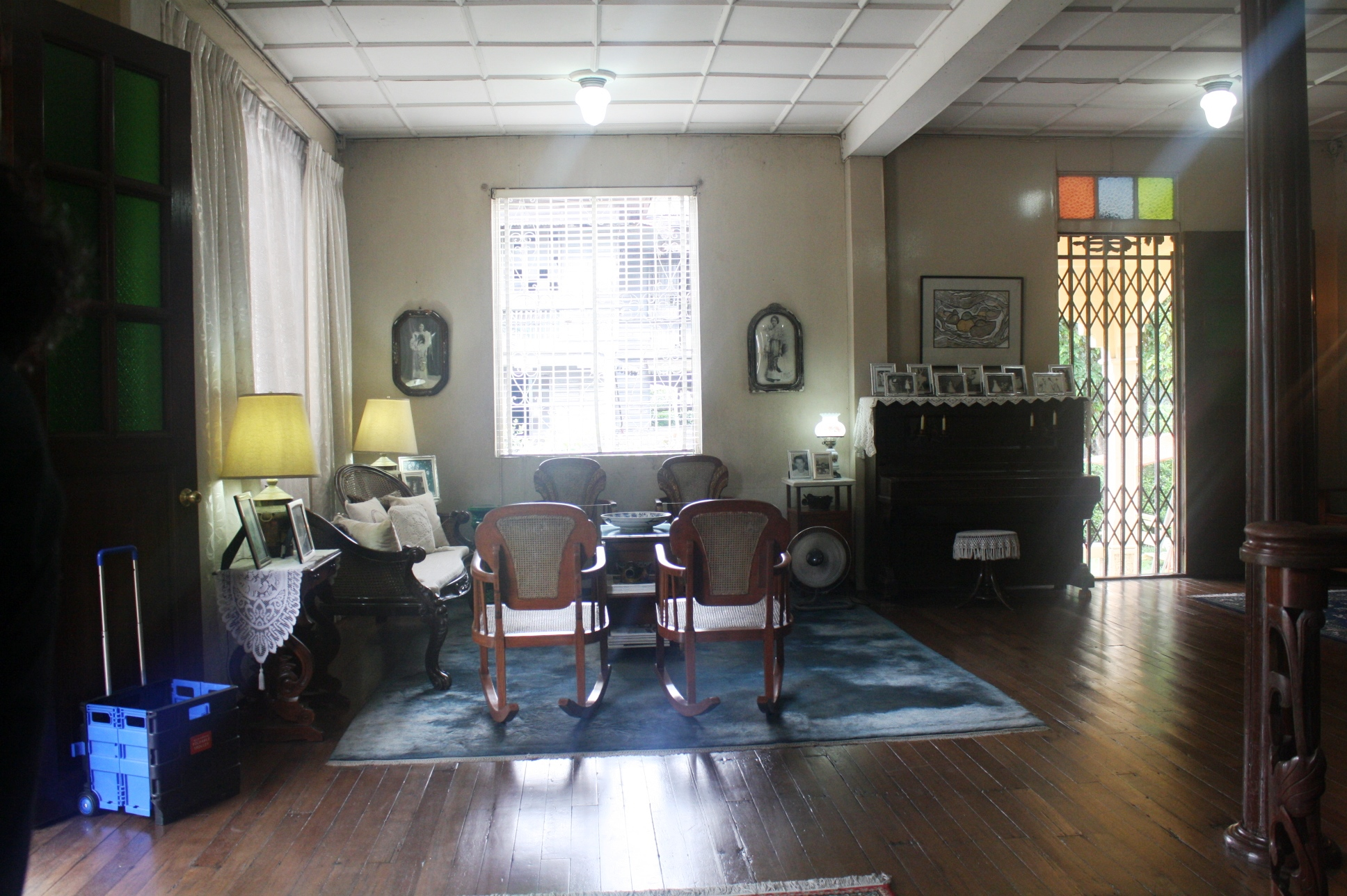
Hofileña Ancestral House

The Hofileña Ancestral House has a historical marker installed by the National Historical Commission of the Philippines (NHCP) on April 6, 1993.

In 1989, the BBC television series "Far Eastern Cookery" shot some of its scenes in the Hofileña Ancestral House when it featured Ilonggo delicacies. The house was also used as a setting by a Canadian movie company for a documentary on the sugar industry in Negros, which was shown at the Toronto Film Festival in 2011.

== Art and architecture ==
Since it was built in the 1930s, the period when Art Deco and Art Nouveau flourished in the country, the Hofileña Ancestral House also reflects such styles. Most of its architectural details were influenced by other houses. Its roof is of classic steep and wide eaves, unlike the galvanized iron sheets that have been the popular roofing material in Manila. The wide steps that lead to the portico is of American influence.

Materials used were hardwood. The grand staircase, which came from Gilda Hofileña's ancestral house, is made of ironwood, or "balayong", which is not susceptible to termites and impenetrable by nails. The balustrades were individually carved by carpenters.

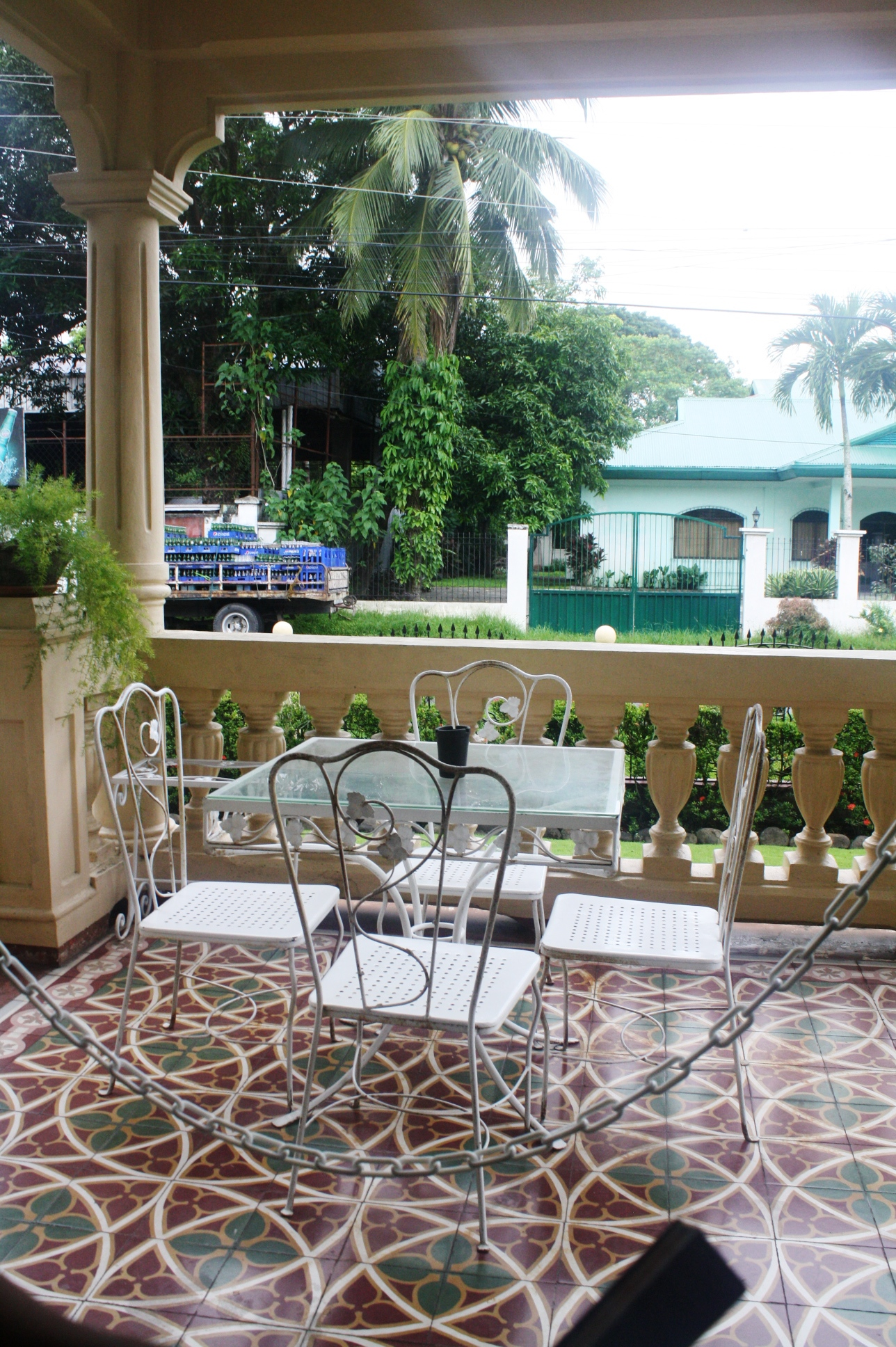
The portico

The floor is made of narra, and polished regularly, giving it a shiny surface. The walls are made of balayong as well. The doors are wide and have tracery cutwork, also known as callado, that provides space for air and light to pass through.

Hofileña's living room, or sala, displays old photos of every family member. On top of its 200-year-old German Steinweig piano stand the photos of the nine siblings, each one of them involved in the arts. There are Spanish chairs in this room and a hand-carved kamagong sofa.

The sala leads to a smaller room, a library, where a vast collection of books, albums, and souvenir items are kept. The bookshelves contain Filipiniana books, some of which were authored by Ramon Hofileña, and the world's first pocketbooks for World War II American soldiers. There were also religious images, such as the wooden image of Saint Vincent Ferrer.

One of the cupboards display the toys Hofileña amassed throughout his travels. What Hofileña claimed as the world's smallest dolls are kept behind the glass-paneled cabinet doors. He also has some sought-after tektite stones as one of his collections.

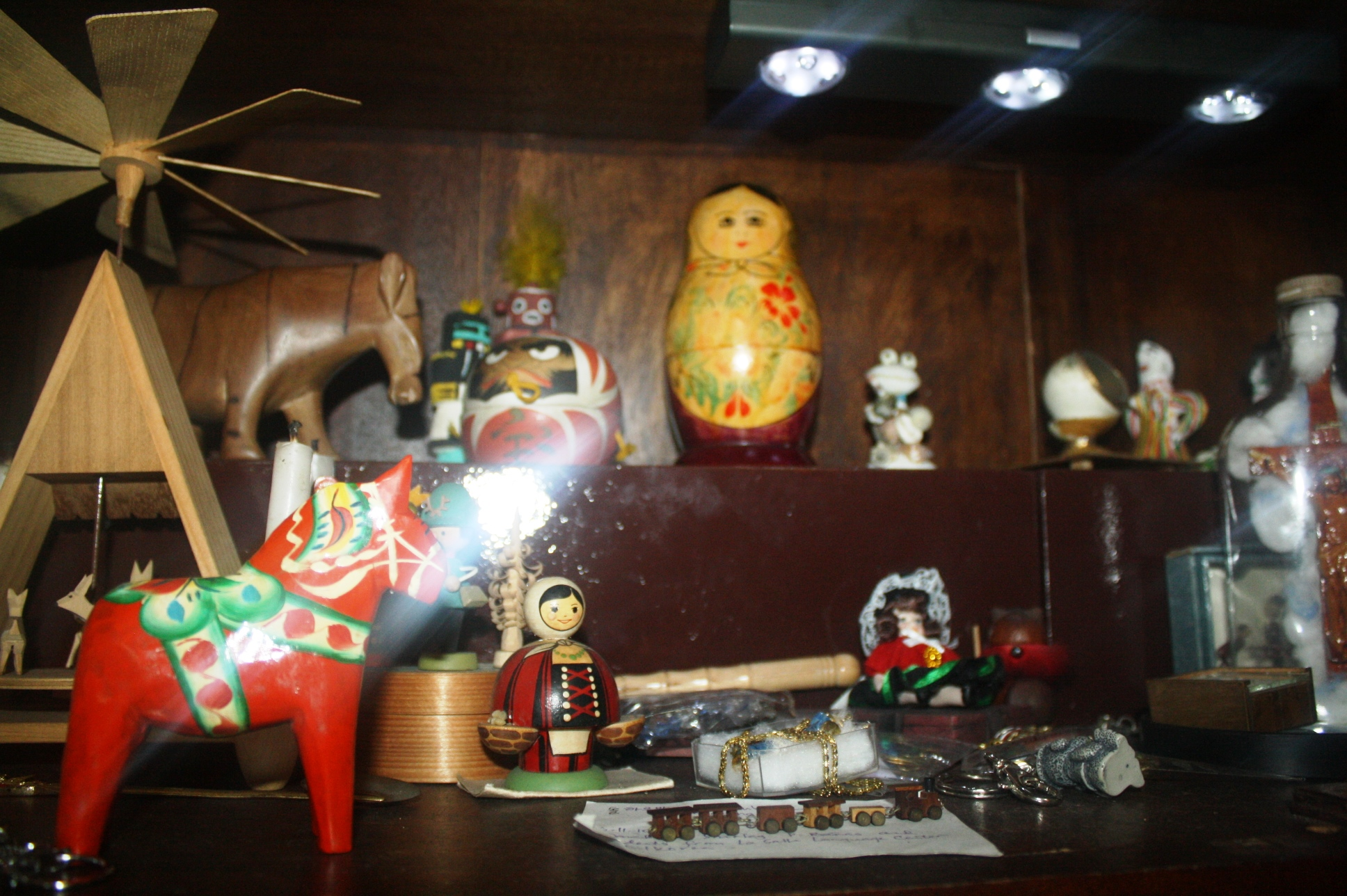
Souvenir collection of Ramon Hofileña

The dining room, or comedor, features cabinets of antique pieces, such as Chinese porcelain wares and jars from the Ming dynasty. Some of them date back as far as 3,000 years ago, like the old Israeli oil juglet. The dining area is also where the first wood-printing in Negros happened. The machine has remained in this room where Mr. Hofileña often demonstrates the art of paper printing to guests.

The bedroom is adorned by a four-poster bed made of narra wood. The beddings are made of embroidery, typical of most Filipino households in the 20th century.

World's smallest doll only at the Hofileña Ancestral House

Apart from its overall look, the house is also a repository of art finds collected by the owner-curator Ramon Hofileña and his family. The second floor is a gallery of over 1,000 art treasures, featuring the paintings and sketches of national artists Juan Luna, Felix Resurrecion Hidalgo, Fernando Amorsolo, Ang Kiukok, Vicente Manansala, Hernando R. Ocampo, and BenCab. Alongside these master's works is a sketch made by the young Jose Rizal, the national hero, and a painting by Spanish artist Francisco Goya.

== Theft ==
On July 5, 2024, the museum announced the theft of a 1936 painting by Fernando Amorsolo titled Mango Harvesters, which hung from the second floor of the house and previously belonged to Ramon Hofileña. The theft was believed to have occurred during the museum's operating hours on July 3. Two suspects were believed to have taken the painting and smuggled it inside a bag. The painting was recovered in Quezon City on July 12 by the National Bureau of Investigation, which arrested two people on suspicion of trying to sell the artwork for ₱3.5 million (US$71,065.99). The painting was returned to the museum on April 25, 2025.
