= Bacong =

Municipality in Negros Oriental, Philippines

- Municipality
- Municipality of Bacong
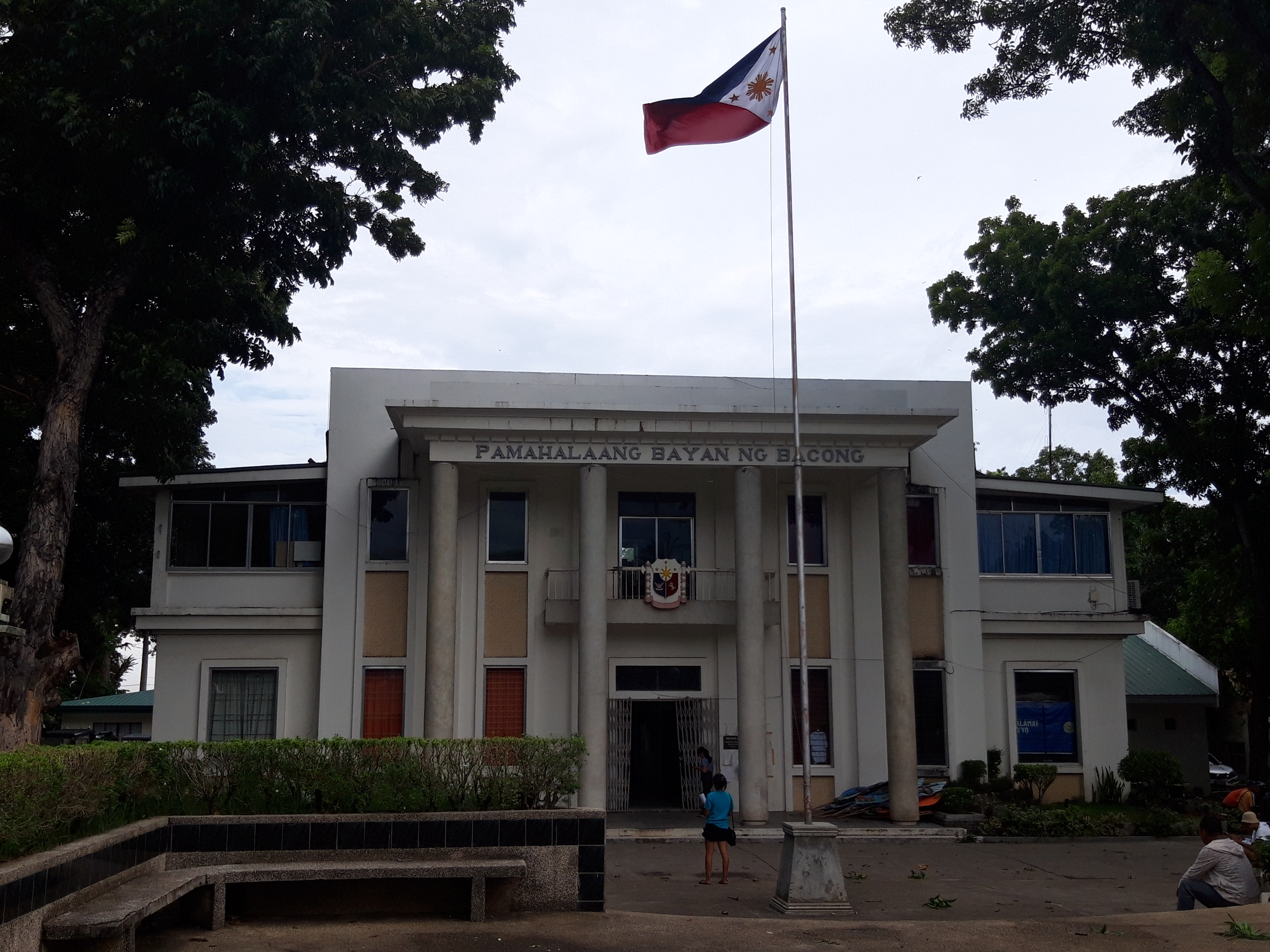
- Municipal hall of Bacong

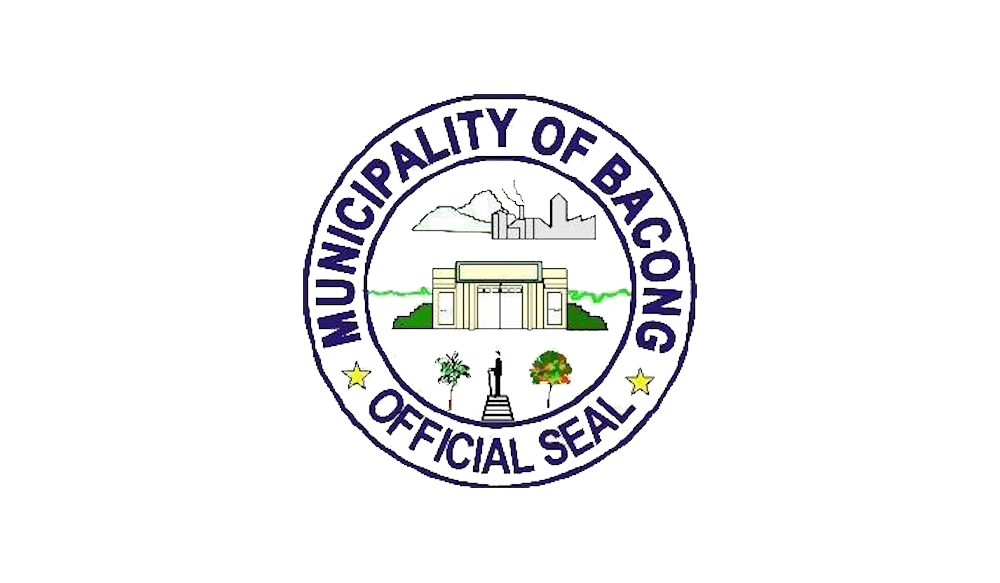
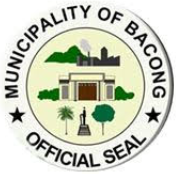
- Flag Seal

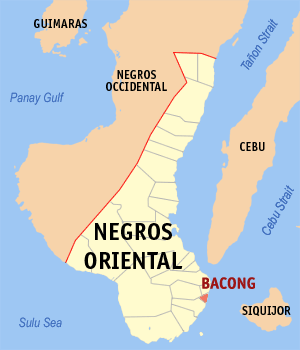
- Map of Negros Oriental with Bacong highlighted
- Interactive map of Bacong
- Location within the Philippines
- Coordinates: 9°14′47″N 123°17′41″E
- Country: Philippines
- Region: Negros Island Region
- Province: Negros Oriental
- District: 3rd district
- Barangays: 22 (see Barangays)

Government
  - Type: Sangguniang Bayan
  - Mayor: Lenin P. Alviola
  - Vice Mayor: Jocelyn A. Alviola (LP)
  - Representative: Janice Degamo (Lakas)
  - Municipal Council: Members: Elma M. Zanisi; Bernadeth Baro-Ausejo; Elenita I. Laure; Michie V. Tuballa; Charles E. Yee; Rosemarie Q. Tinguha; Cesar T. Blanco, Jr.; Arlene B. Tindoc; Charlie F. Yupo ^{‡}; Merbun I. Dianon ^{◌}; ‡ ex officio ABC president; ◌ ex officio SK chairman
  - Electorate: 26,327 voters (2025)

Area
  - Total: 40.30 km^{2} (15.56 sq mi)
- Elevation: 42 m (138 ft)
- Highest elevation: 241 m (791 ft)
- Lowest elevation: 0 m (0 ft)

Population (2024 census)
  - Total: 43,889
  - Density: 1,089/km^{2} (2,821/sq mi)
  - Households: 10,105

Economy
  - Income class: 2nd municipal income class
  - Poverty incidence: 16.61% (2023)
  - Revenue: ₱ 208.4 million (2024)
  - Assets: ₱ 2,325 million (2024)
  - Expenditure: ₱ 70.79 million (2024)
  - Liabilities: ₱ 1,750 million (2024)

Service provider
  - Electricity: Negros Oriental 2 Electric Cooperative (NORECO 2)
- Time zone: UTC+8 (PST)
- ZIP code: 6216
- PSGC: 074603000
- IDD : area code: +63 (0)35
- Native languages: Cebuano; Tagalog

Bacong, officially the Municipality of Bacong, is a municipality in the province of Negros Oriental, Philippines. According to the 2024 census, it has a population of 43,889 people.

Bacong was the hometown of the Visayan hero of the Philippine Revolution, Pantaleon Villegas, better known as León Kilat.

Bacong is 8 kilometres (5.0 mi) from Dumaguete.

== History ==
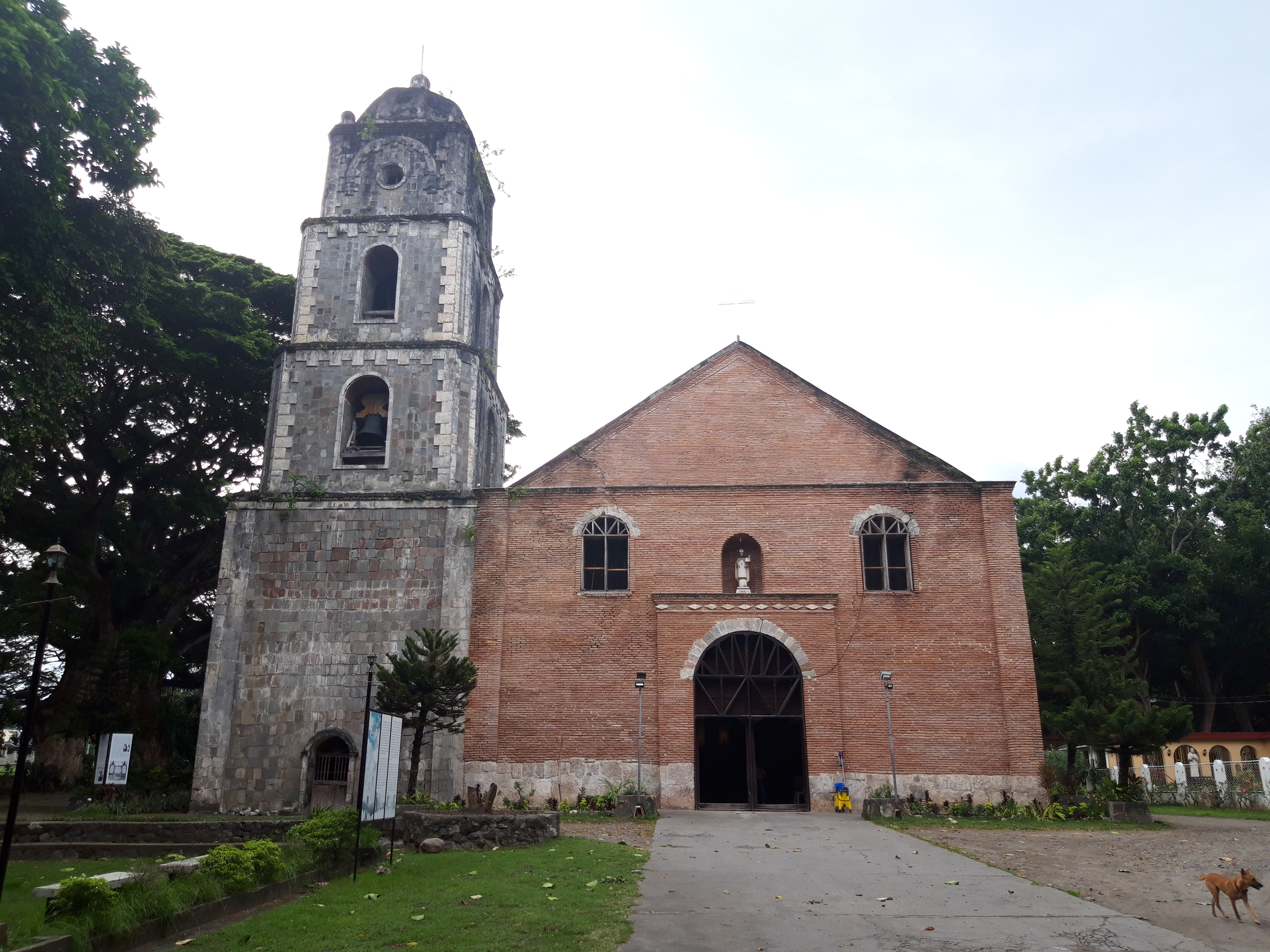
Saint Augustine of Hippo Church, a declared National Cultural Treasure

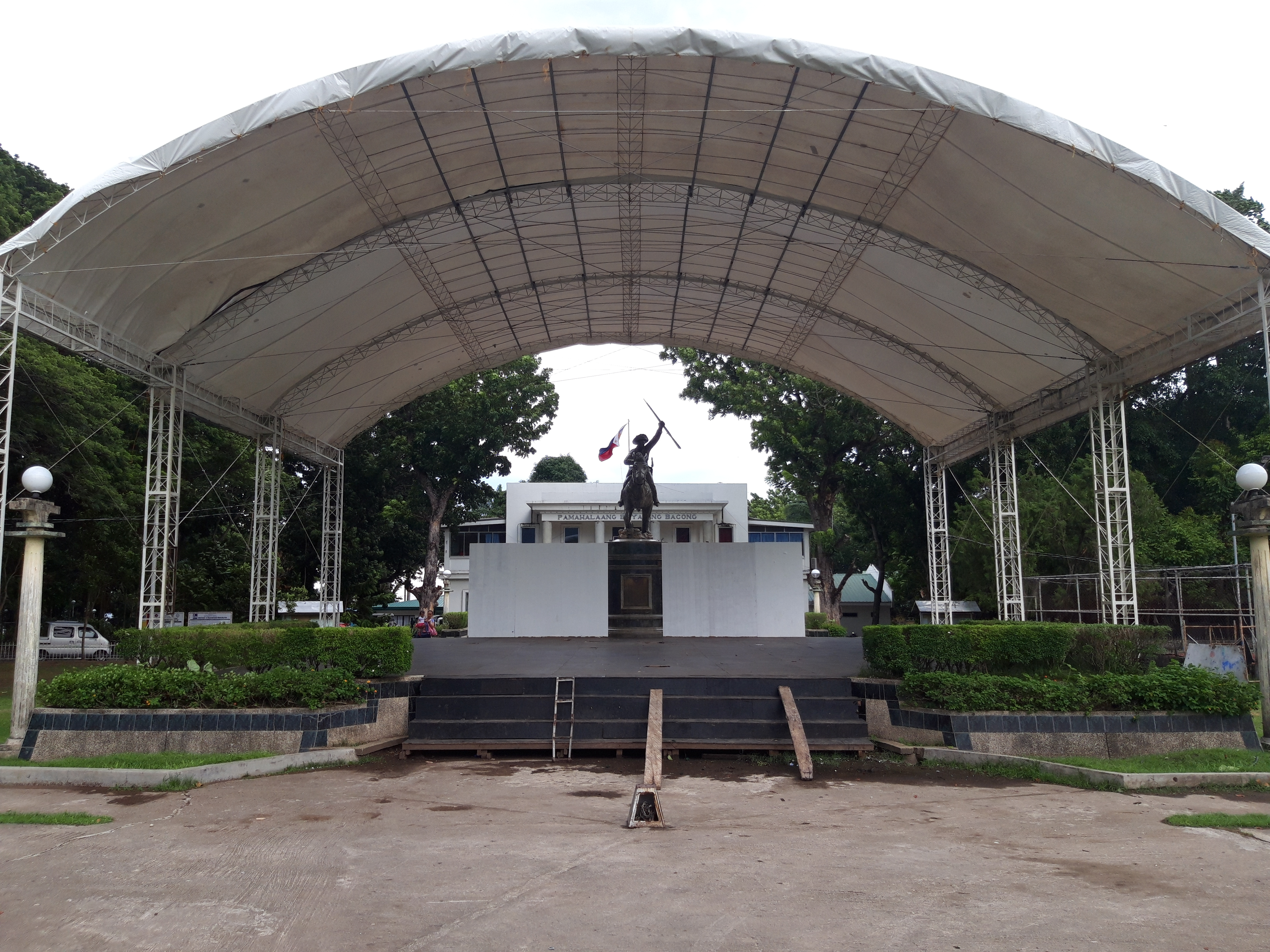
Statue of Pantaleon "Leon Kilat" Villegas at Bacong Town Plaza

Bacong was established in 1801 as a coastal settlement and is the first town south of the provincial capital. The Church of San Agustin de Hippo, along with its monastery, began construction in 1866 under Fray Leandro Arrúe Agudo, two years after he assumed his role as parish priest in 1864 as part of the Augustinian Recollects' missionary work. The monastery now serves a retreat house. The stone church house boasts the province's tallest belfry and oldest main altar, adorned with gold-leafing and painted friezes. Its choir holds a pipe organ from Zaragoza, Spain, installed in 1898 shortly before the revolution against Spain broke out in Negros Oriental. The only other pipe organ of similar provenance is found in Bohol. With its reasonably well-preserved complex including churchyard and convent (ca 1850), the San Agustin of Hippo Church in Bacong is one of the 26 colonial churches all over the country selected for restoration by the National Commission for Culture and the Arts. Bacong's historical importance is well-monumented: it is the birthplace of Negros Oriental's hero and only Katipunero – General Pantaleon Villegas, aka Leon Kilat, whose birthday is celebrated every July 27. Barrio Isugan was the site of a battle between Filipino and American soldiers.

Beginning the Second World War, Japanese Imperial forces were entered and occupied in Bacong in 1942. Filipino soldiers and guerrillas were encounter by the Japanese Imperial forces start the conflicts from 1942 to 1945 during the occupation. When Allied forces liberated in Bacong was fought against the Japanese Occupation until the end in World War II in 1945. The general headquarters of the Philippine Commonwealth Army and Philippine Constabulary was active in 1945 to 1946 in Bacong during and aftermath in World War II.

Points of interest in Bacong include a stretch of beaches along its shoreline, traditional sinamay handloom weaving, and the Negros Oriental Arts and Heritage (NOAH), which produces export-quality stonecraft furniture, jewelry boxes, and fashion accessories.

One of the town's bigger barangays, San Miguel, marks its local fiesta with a unique Sinulog de San Miguel, where the archangel and his heavenly army are depicted battling the forces of evil.

Lawmakers have been proposing to transfer the province's airport from the town of Sibulan to Bacong since 2014, and is still pending final approval as of 2022.

== Geography ==
=== Barangays ===
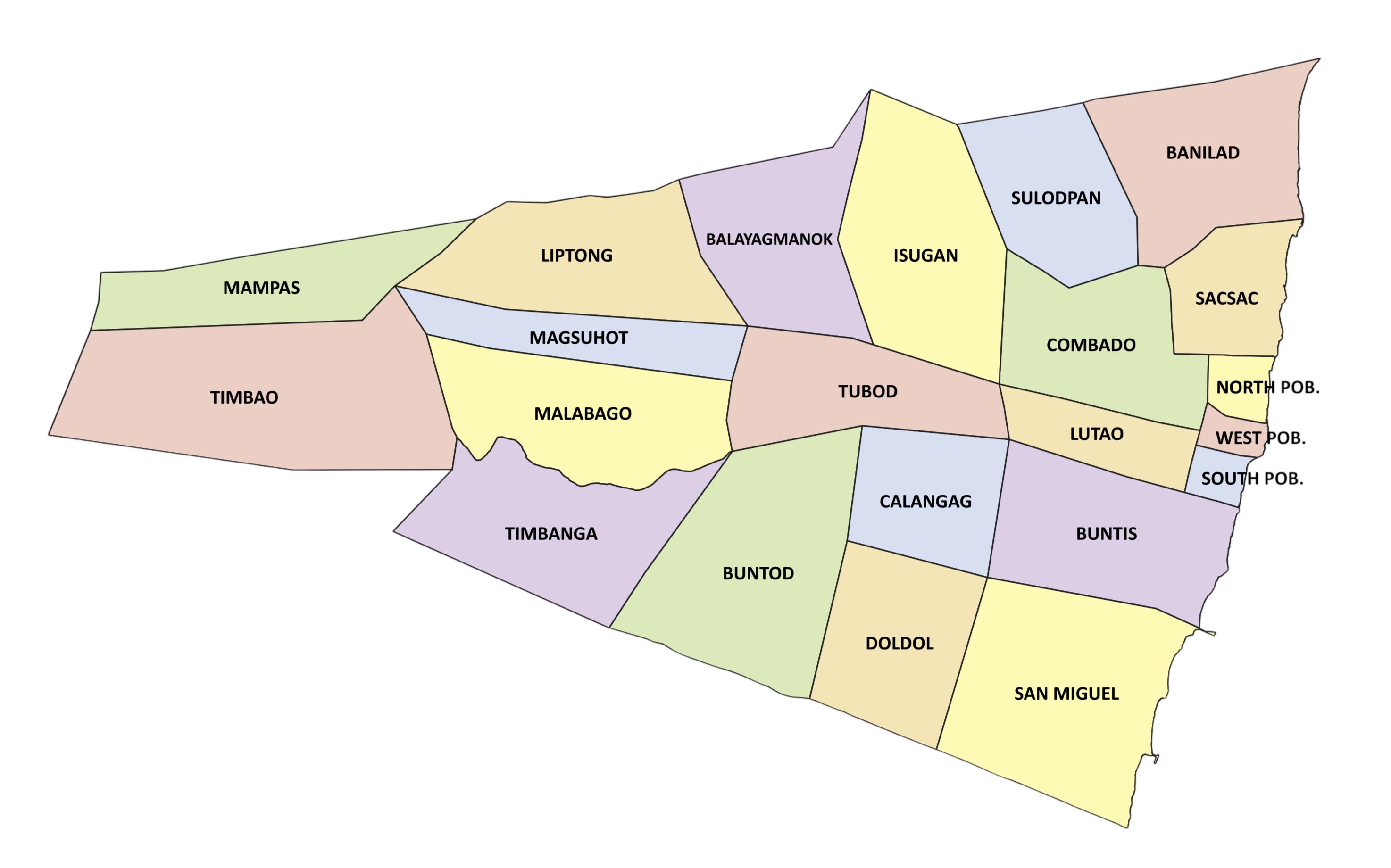
Political map of Bacong

Bacong is politically subdivided into 22 barangays. Each barangay consists of puroks and some have sitios.

PSGC	Barangay	Population			±% p.a.	
		2024		2010		
074603001	Balayagmanok	3.2%	1,412	1,149	▴	1.43%
074603002	Banilad	12.6%	5,512	3,931	▴	2.35%
074603003	Buntis	9.1%	3,987	2,593	▴	3.00%
074603004	Buntod	4.6%	2,030	1,680	▴	1.31%
074603005	Calangag	1.7%	734	555	▴	1.94%
074603006	Combado	8.6%	3,759	2,072	▴	4.18%
074603007	Doldol	2.5%	1,097	913	▴	1.27%
074603008	Isugan	4.4%	1,910	1,341	▴	2.46%
074603009	Liptong	2.7%	1,185	781	▴	2.91%
074603010	Lutao	3.0%	1,298	1,087	▴	1.23%
074603011	Magsuhot	0.9%	384	340	▴	0.84%
074603012	Malabago	0.8%	368	331	▴	0.73%
074603013	Mampas	1.0%	431	175	▴	6.39%
074603014	North Poblacion	2.3%	1,011	995	▴	0.11%
074603015	Sacsac	9.6%	4,199	3,323	▴	1.62%
074603016	San Miguel	10.9%	4,762	4,101	▴	1.03%
074603017	South Poblacion	3.4%	1,492	1,576	▾	−0.38%
074603018	Sulodpan	3.9%	1,712	1,457	▴	1.12%
074603019	Timbanga	2.9%	1,291	1,035	▴	1.53%
074603020	Timbao	2.3%	1,003	1,079	▾	−0.50%
074603021	Tubod	2.2%	970	968	▴	0.01%
074603022	West Poblacion	1.5%	660	804	▾	−1.35%
	Total		43,889	32,286	▴	2.13%

=== Climate ===
Climate data for Bacong, Negros Oriental
Month	Jan	Feb	Mar	Apr	May	Jun	Jul	Aug	Sep	Oct	Nov	Dec	Year
Mean daily maximum °C (°F)	30 (86)	30 (86)	31 (88)	33 (91)	32 (90)	31 (88)	30 (86)	30 (86)	30 (86)	29 (84)	30 (86)	30 (86)	31 (87)
Mean daily minimum °C (°F)	22 (72)	22 (72)	22 (72)	23 (73)	24 (75)	25 (77)	24 (75)	24 (75)	24 (75)	24 (75)	23 (73)	23 (73)	23 (74)
Average precipitation mm (inches)	26 (1.0)	22 (0.9)	28 (1.1)	41 (1.6)	95 (3.7)	136 (5.4)	147 (5.8)	126 (5.0)	132 (5.2)	150 (5.9)	98 (3.9)	46 (1.8)	1,047 (41.3)
Average rainy days	7.5	6.7	8.9	10.4	21.6	25.6	26.3	25.0	24.1	26.2	19.2	12.1	213.6
Source: Meteoblue (modeled/calculated data, not measured locally)

== Demographics ==
Population census of Bacong

Year	Pop.	±% p.a.
1903	9,678	—
1918	10,094	+0.28%
1939	10,644	+0.25%
1948	8,676	−2.25%
1960	10,592	+1.68%
1970	12,065	+1.31%
1975	13,368	+2.08%
1980	13,123	−0.37%

Year	Pop.	±% p.a.
1990	16,384	+2.24%
1995	19,177	+2.99%
2000	23,219	+4.19%
2007	28,310	+2.77%
2010	32,286	+4.90%
2015	36,527	+2.38%
2020	41,207	+2.57%
2024	43,889	+1.53%

Source: Philippine Statistics Authority

== Economy ==
Poverty incidence of Bacong (%)

Source: Philippine Statistics Authority

== Education ==
The public schools in the town of Bacong are administered by one school district under the Schools Division of Negros Oriental.

Elementary schools:

- Bacong Central School — Roxas Street, West Poblacion
- Buntod Elementary School — Buntod
- Calangag Elementary School — Calangag
- Fausto M. Sarono - Tubod Elementary School — Tubod
- Isugan Elementary School — Isugan
- Nazario Tale Memorial Elementary School — Banilad
- Sacsac Elementary School — Sacsac
- San Miguel Elementary School — San Miguel
- Timbanga Elementary School — Timbanga
- Timbao Elementary School — Timbao

High schools:

- Buntod High School — Buntod
- Isugan Integrated School - Isugan
- Ong Che Tee - Bacong High School — Nat'l Highway, Sacsac
- San Miguel National High School — San Miguel

Private schools:

- Bacong Holy Family High School — Nat'l Highway, West Poblacion
- Divine Grace International Christian School — Buntis
- DLHOH Institute Learning Center — Nat'l Highway, North Poblacion
- Shine Bacong Christian Learning Center, Inc. — Combado

== Sister Cities ==
- Gimpo City, Gyeonggi Province, South Korea
