= Bacong Church =

Roman Catholic church in Negros Oriental, Philippines

- Saint Augustine of Hippo Parish Church
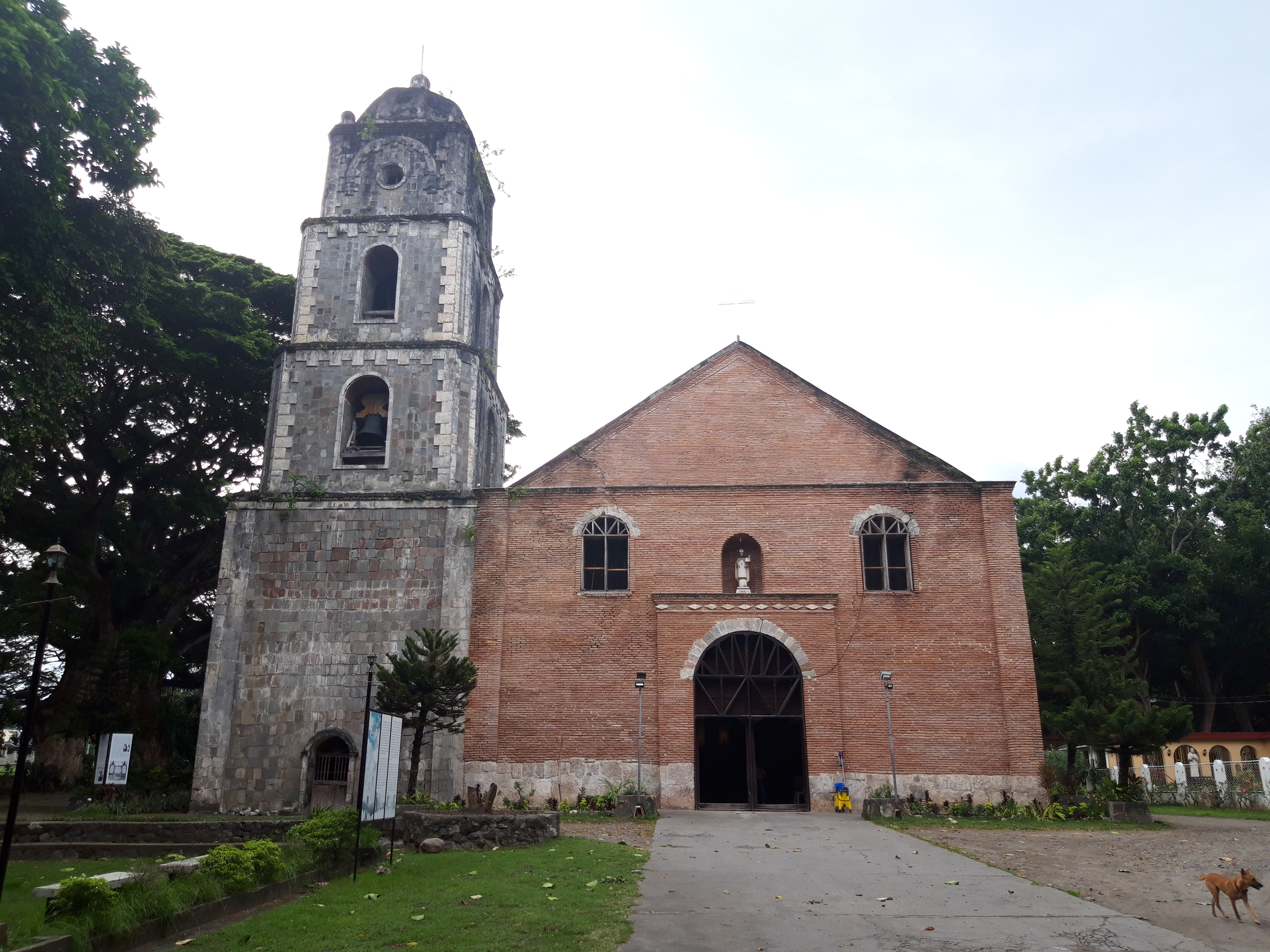
- Church facade in 2019

- Location in the Visayas Location in the Philippines
- 9°14′45″N 123°17′44″E
- Location: Bacong, Negros Oriental
- Country: Philippines
- Denomination: Roman Catholic

History
- Status: Parish church
- Dedication: Augustine of Hippo

Architecture
- Functional status: Active
- Heritage designation: National Cultural Treasure
- Designated: 1972
- Architectural type: Church building
- Completed: 1865; 161 years ago

Administration
- Diocese: Dumaguete

Saint Augustine of Hippo Parish Church, commonly known as Bacong Church, is a Roman Catholic church located in Bacong, Negros Oriental, Philippines. It is under the jurisdiction of the Diocese of Dumaguete.

The Augustinian Recollects built the church in 1865. It is partly made of bricks, a deviation from the coral stones, which is the usual construction material used for churches during the Spanish colonization in the Philippines. In addition, the belfry has a caracol-type stairs, and has a number of L-shape masonry work on its walls, a rarity among Philippine churches.

The church has a pipe organ, which originally came from Zaragoza, Spain in the late 19th century.

The National Museum of the Philippines declared it a national cultural property in 1972.

== Gallery ==
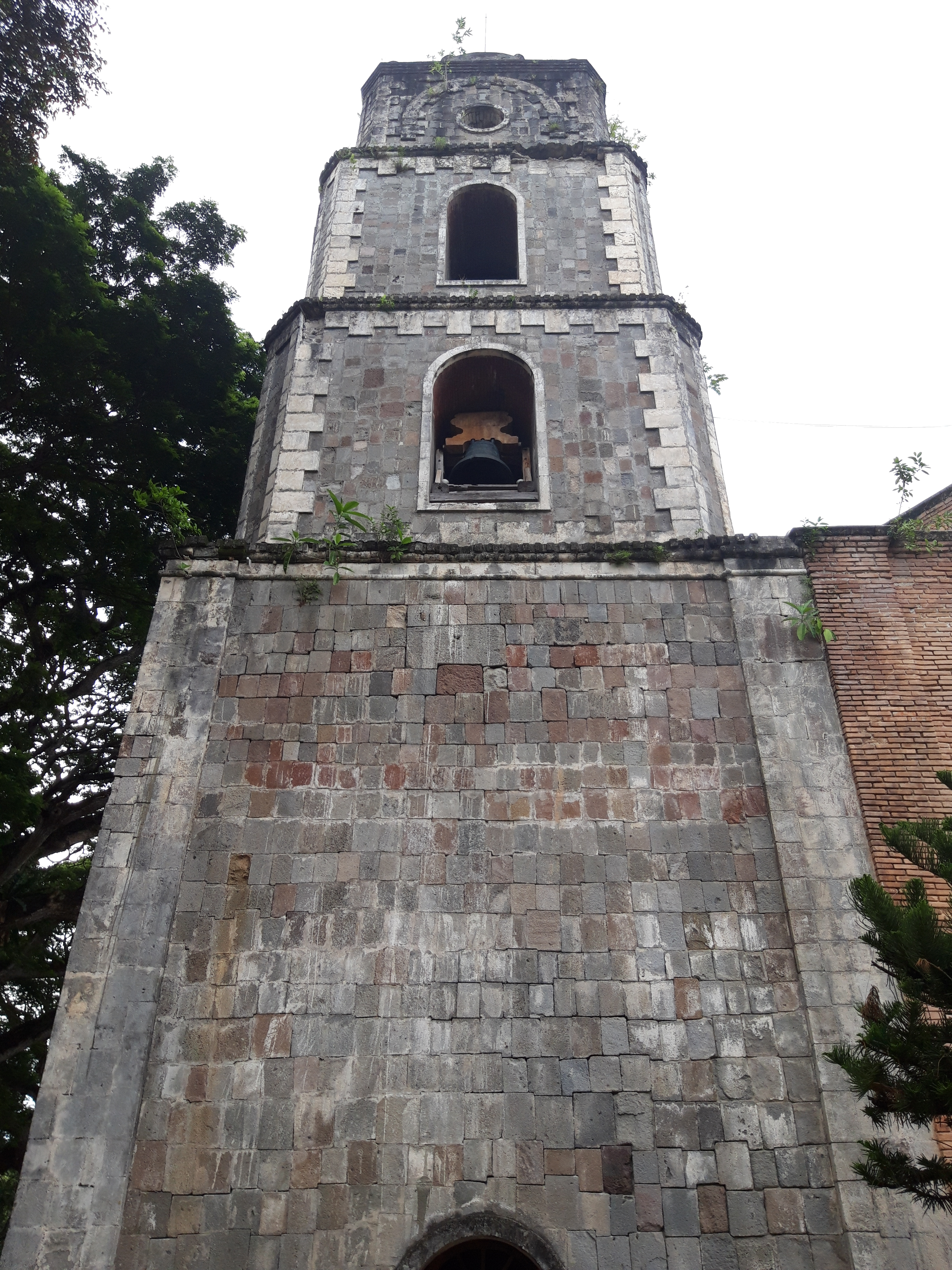
Belfry

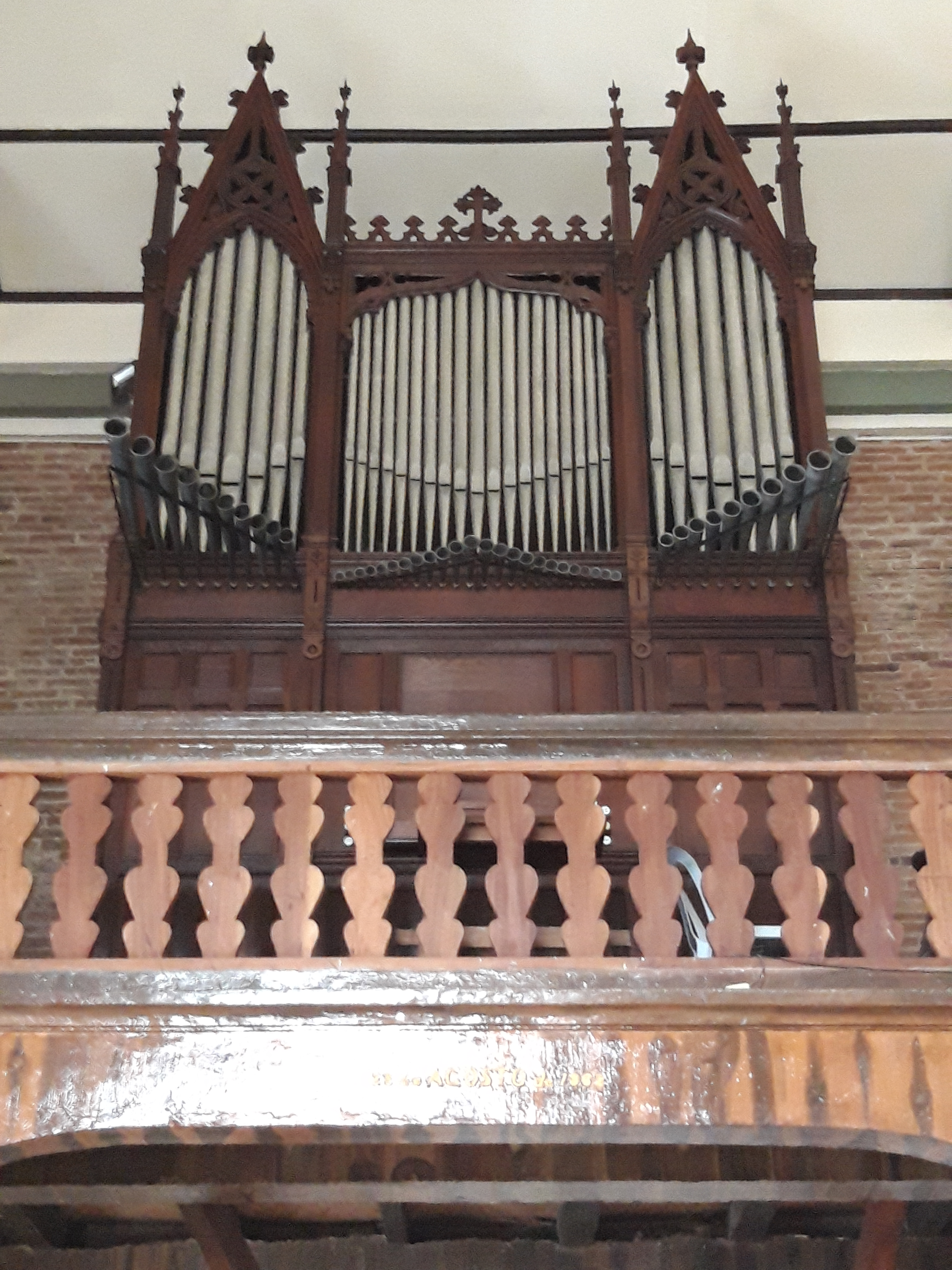
Pipe organ

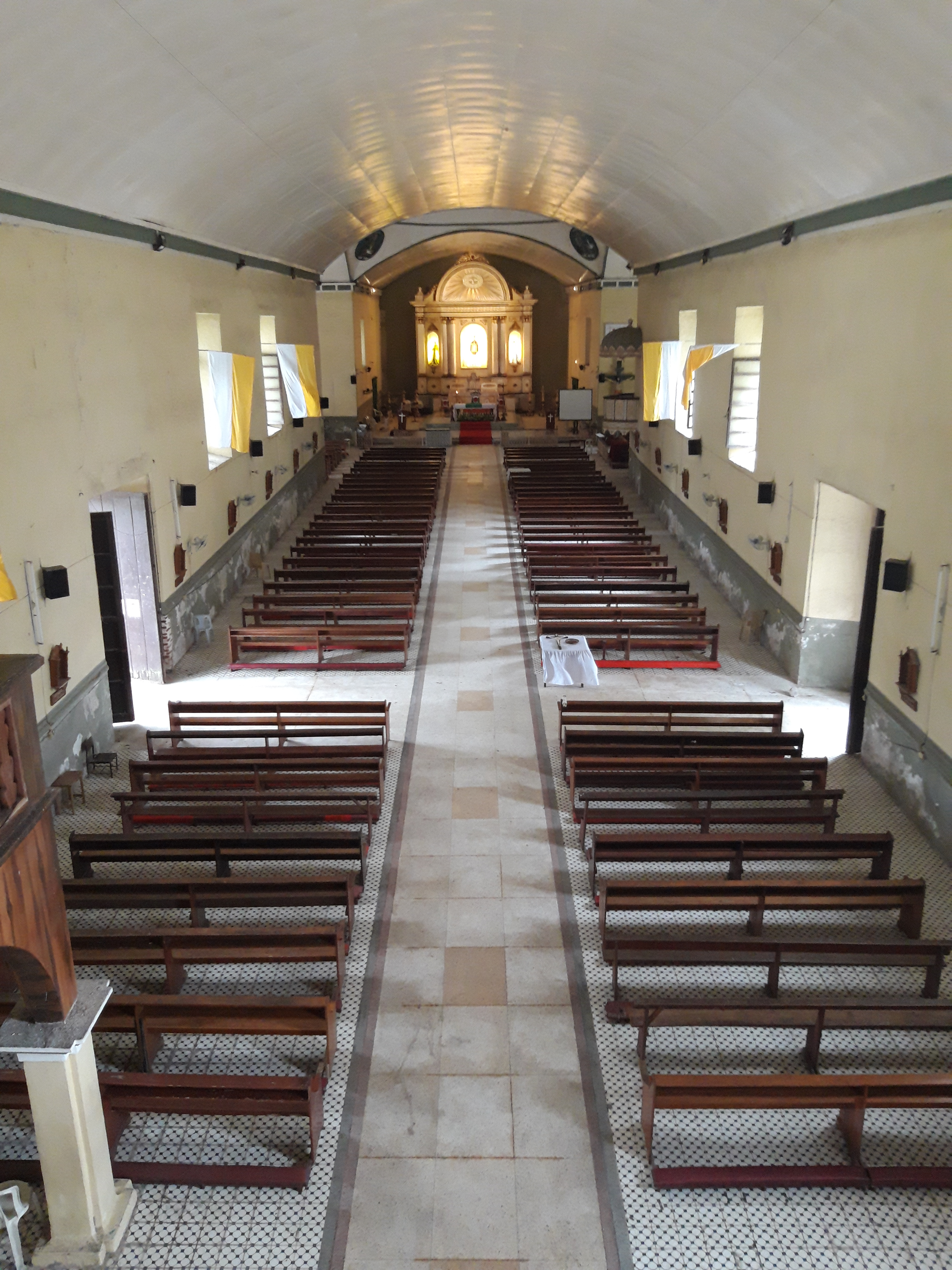
Interior

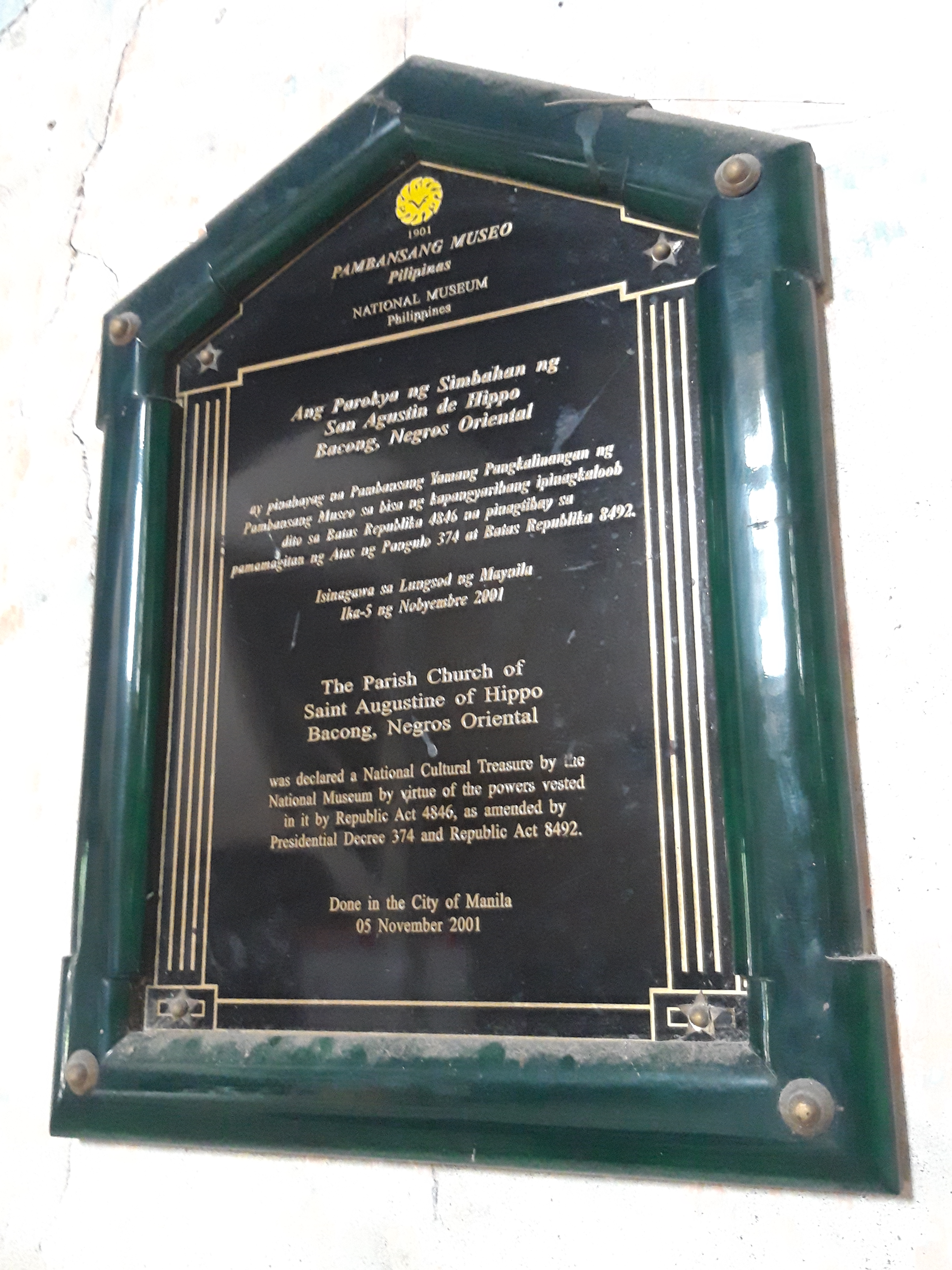
National Cultural Treasure marker
