= Bernardino Jalandoni Museum =

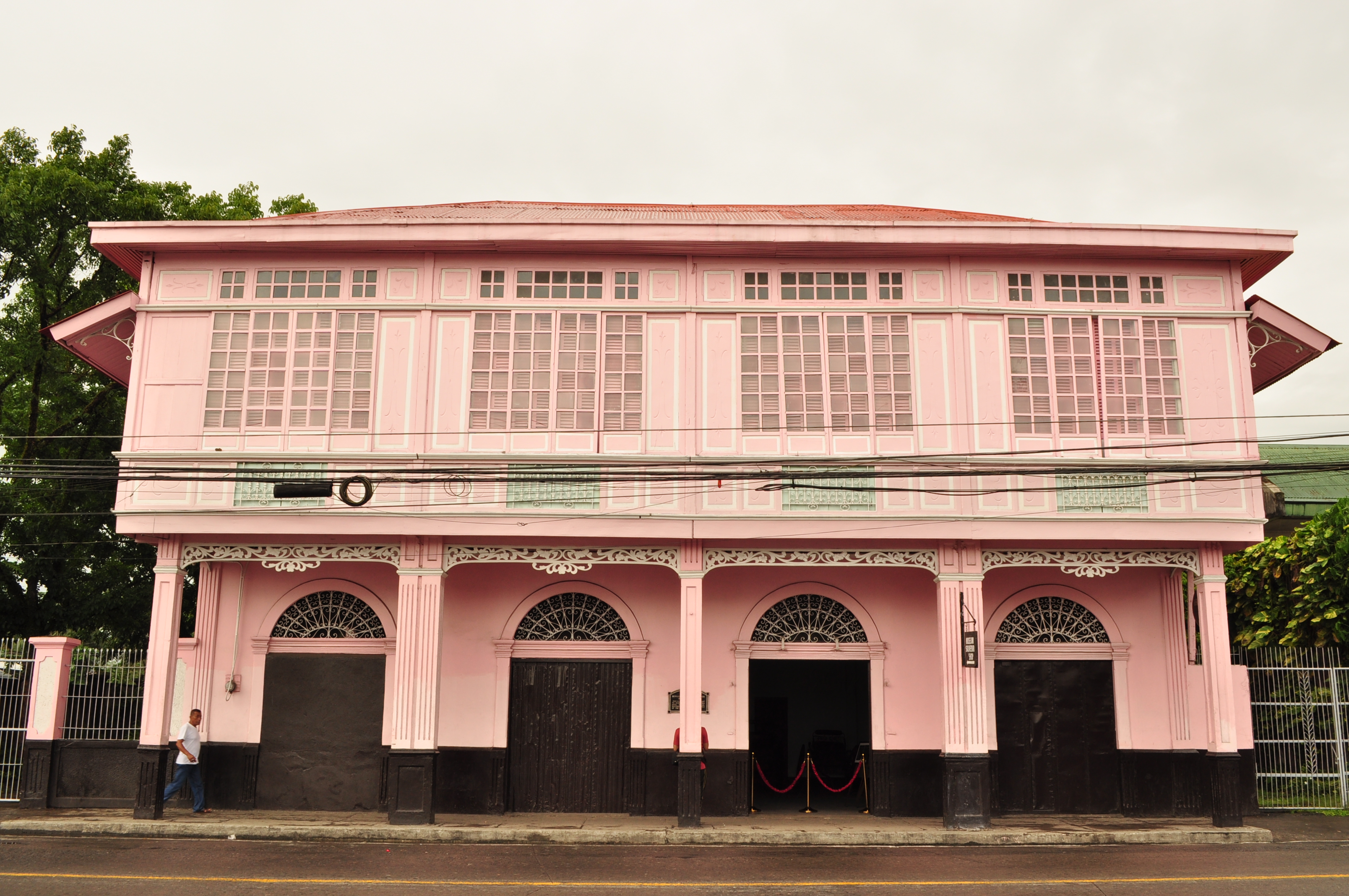
- The facade of the Bernardino Jalandoni Museum
- Established: 1908
- Location: Rizal Street, Silay City, Negros Occidental, Philippines
- Coordinates: 10°48′07″N 122°58′38″E
- Type: lifestyle museum
- Curators: Silay Heritage Foundation, Inc.
- Public transit access: bus, jeepney, pedicab, tricycle from any point in the city

The Bernardino Jalandoni Museum, also known as the Bernardino Jalandoni House, located along Rizal Street, Silay City, in the province of Negros Occidental, Philippines, is the original residence of the late Don Bernardino and Doña Ysabel Jalandoni. The museum is also known as the "Pink House" because of its conspicuous pink paint that easily grabs attention.

== History ==
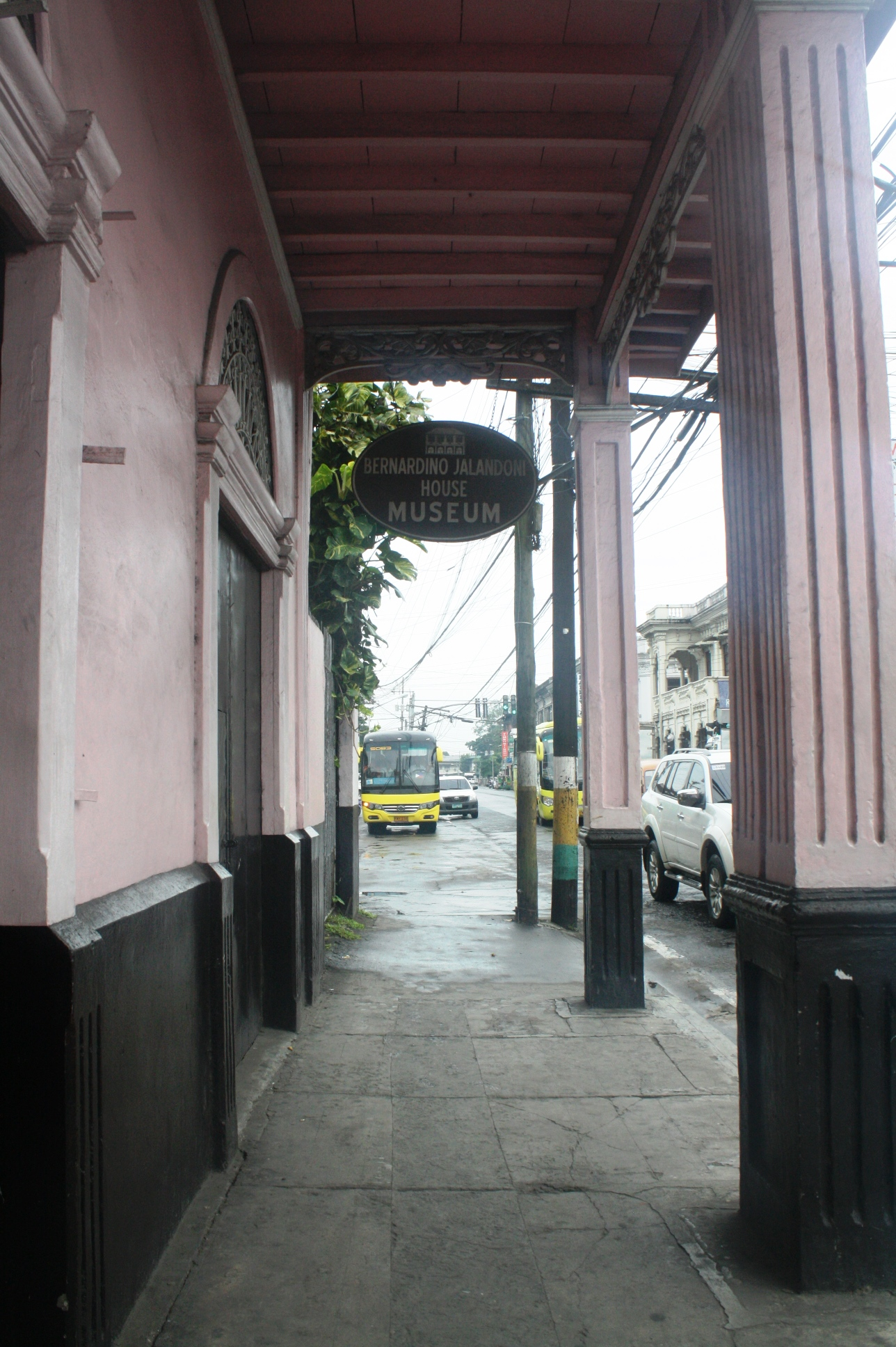
The entrance to the Bernardino Jalandoni Museum

Don Bernardino and Doña Ysabel Lopez Ledesma were originally from Jaro, Iloilo City and migrated to Silay, Negros Occidental where they eventually settled and raised their children. In Silay City, along the main highway, they built their house which depicts the typical opulent houses during the early 20th century. The house was completed in 1908.

The portion of the street right in front of the Jalandoni House is narrower than the rest of the highway because a group of Silaynons fought for the preservation of the heritage houses when a road expansion project threatened to demolish these old structures, which included the ancestral home of the Jalandonis.

On November 6, 1993, the National Historical Institute declared the Jalandoni House a National Historical Landmark, the first to be recognized as such in the City of Silay.

Mr. Antonio J. Montinola, the grandson of Bernardino Jalandoni by his only daughter Angeles Jalandoni Montinola, who inherited the house, have placed the care and maintenance of the Museum to the Silay Heritage Foundation, Inc. It is often used as a venue for artistic, cultural and education events and performances.

== Art & architecture ==
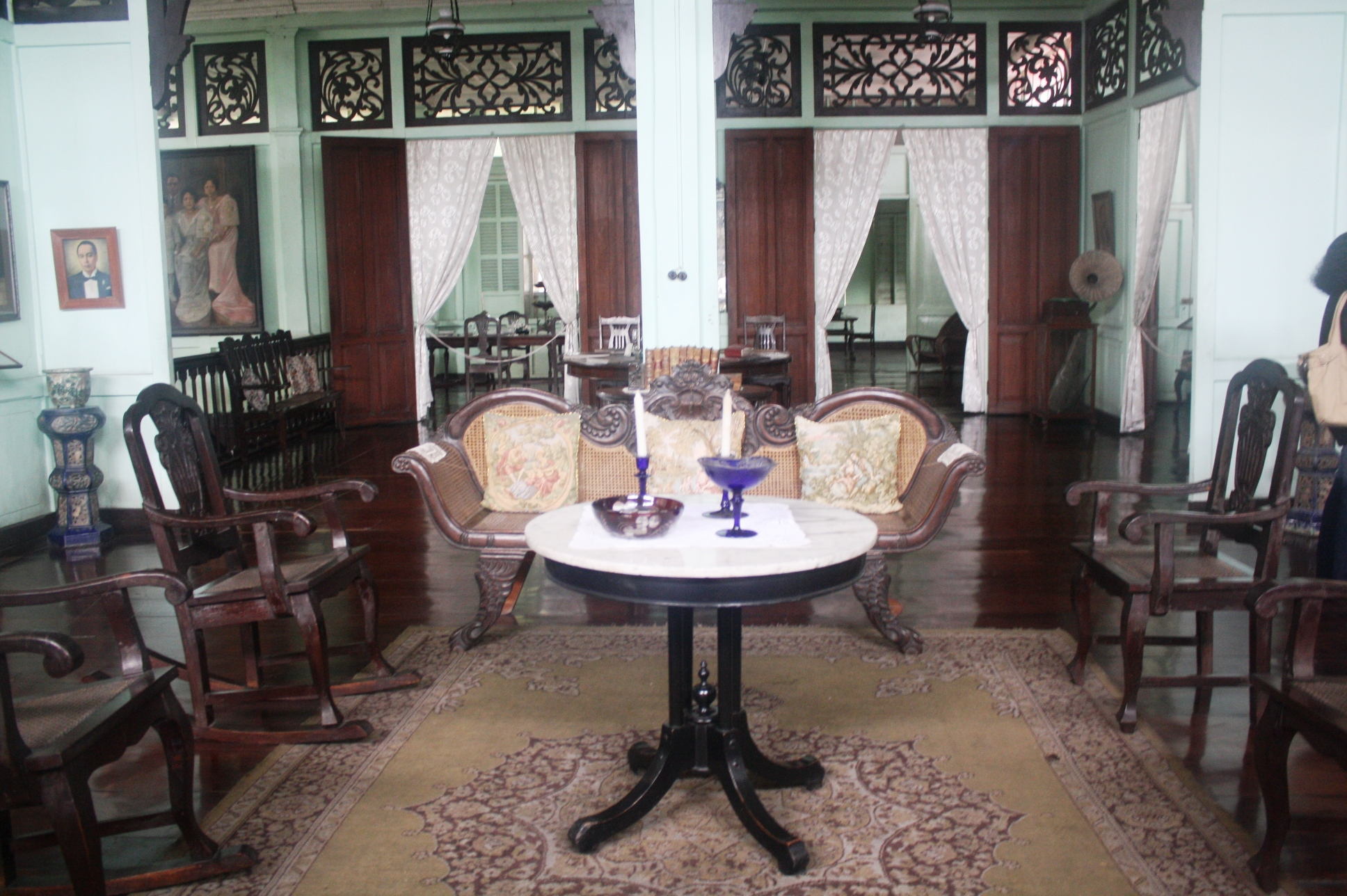
The living room located at the second floor. Note the intricate wooden transoms of the house.

The design of the Jalandoni House, with its square shape elevated by posts or stilts and roof construction, It is a Bahay na Bato which based from the structure of a typical nipa hut in the Philippines although the former is larger in scale than the latter. The two-storey house is made of balayong, a hardwood that had to be shipped by the Jalandonis from Mindoro.

In its interiors, the ceiling is made of embossed steel trays that were brought from Hamburg, Germany. The wooden transoms are cut out style or callado that infuses elaborate French design. There are large windows for better lighting and ventilation; these use capiz shells instead of glass for privacy.

In the first floor, two carts and a horse carriage were on display as the ground floor used to function as a garage. Most of the activities were held on the second floor, and where most of the artifacts are kept. As such, the living room, bedrooms, kitchen and dining room are all located in the upper floor.

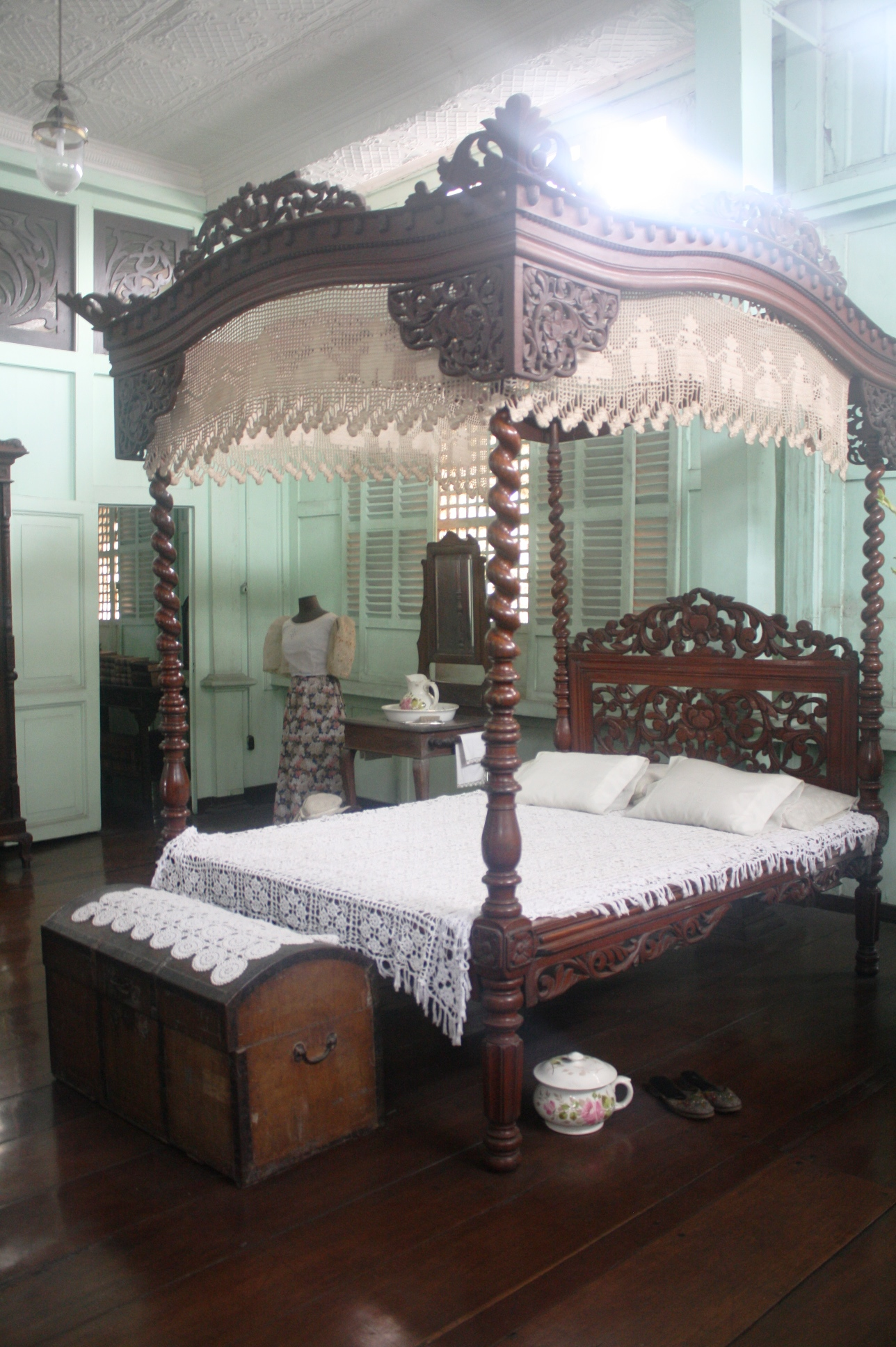
Four-post bed with a chamber pot beneath it

The living room and receiving area display an old Steinway piano, a gramophone, a sewing machine, an old telephone, and several paintings. Inside the bedrooms are four-post beds, chamber pots, and a birthing chair. The kitchen shows old items used for daily activities, such as the heavy chopped woods known as the prinsa de paa and prinsa de mano, as well as the round irons used to press clothes.
