= Don Estaquio Hofileña Memorial Elementary School =

Public elementary school in Negros Occidental, Philippines

Don Eustaquio Hofileña Memorial Elementary School
- DEHMES

Location
- Rizal Street; Silay City; Philippines
- Coordinates: 10°47′48″N 122°58′21″E

Information
- Type: Public School
- Established: 1980
- Grades: 7 to 12
- Campus type: Urban
- Colours: Orange and Yellow

Don Estaquio or Don Eustaquio Hofileña Memorial Elementary School is a public school in Silay City. It occupies a portion of the lot that was initially donated to Silay South Elementary School.

== History ==
The school opened in 1980 after the Silay City National High School had transferred beside it. The school started as an extension class of Silay South Elementary School with five teachers initially hired. In 1980, there was a move that made the school as an independent one, and was renamed to Don Eustaquio Hofileña Memorial Elementary School. The first principal was Mrs. Mutya Jaranilla Arceo. The school served as an alternative academe for excess classes and enrollment from other institutions like Silay North Elementary School, Silay South Elementary School and Governor Emilio Gaston Memorial Elementary School.

== Present ==
The buildings and rooms are old and mostly need repair, yet those are still usable. The school is painted with Orange and Yellow; the theme colors of the school.

== See also ==
- Silay South Elementary School
- Silay City
- Doña Montserrat Lopez Memorial High School
- St. Theresita's Academy
- Silay Institute
