= Servants of St. Joseph =

Female religious congregation of the Catholic church

- Siervas de San José
- Abbreviation: SSJ
- Formation: January 7, 1874; 152 years ago
- Type: Religious congregation of the Catholic Church
- Purpose: Pastoral work, missions, education
- Key people: Francesc Xavier Butinyà i Hospital; Bonifacia Rodríguez-Castro
- Website: www.siervasdesanjose.org

The Servants of St. Joseph (Spanish: Siervas de San José, who use the postnominal initials SSJ) form an international congregation of religious sisters in the Roman Catholic Church. It was founded by Saint Bonifacia Rodríguez-Castro on January 7, 1874, with the support and guidance of a Catalan Jesuit, Fr. Francesc Xavier Butinyà i Hospital, S.J., in Salamanca, Spain, and named after Saint Joseph.

== Foundation ==
Bonifacia Rodríguez was born in Salamanca on June 6, 1837, in a small home on Las Mazas Street near the ancient University. Her father was a tailor and the family was very poor, frequently having to move because he was unable to pay the rent. From a very young age, Bonifacia helped her father with his craft, by sewing some of the work he was able to get, as well as caring for her younger siblings.

After completing basic schooling, Bonifacia began to work as a ropemaker. Later, in 1865, after the marriage of her sister, she was able to set up her home as a factory for rope, lace, and various other items. In this way, Rodríguez lived a quiet life in which she was able to grow and deepen her faith, meditating and praying throughout the daily routine.

After five years as an independent artisan, in 1870, Bonifacia met a newly arrived priest from Catalunya, Francesc Butinyà, S.J. Butinyà was from a family of factory owners, but he had a vision of responding to the needs of the growing working class which had arisen from the Industrial Revolution, one which was far ahead of the Church leaders of the day. He preached that work was a way for all to become more free and equal in society, and also to give witness to the teachings of the Gospel. Rodríguez frequently attended the Masses at which Butinyà preached and decided that he had an answer to her spiritual searching.

Bonifacia opened her workshop as a meeting place for gatherings of working women like herself, both for socializing and for times of reflection on the themes and issues of the day. They invited Father Butinyà to these gatherings, and, under his guidance, they established themselves as the Association of the Immaculate Conception and St. Joseph. Gradually, Rodríguez felt herself called to religious life in a convent, and finally decided to enter a local one. Butinyà, however, saw in her the model he envisioned of someone who could imitate the quiet life of service and prayer which Christ Himself had followed in his home in Nazareth, with Mary, His mother, and Joseph. He therefore proposed to her that she take a radically different path, one in which a community of religious women could respond to the situation of poor, working women.

== A new congregation ==
Rodríguez took up the challenge and six of her companions moved into her small home to form a religious community, with her as their leader. This took place on January 10, 1874. It was a troubled time in Spanish society, one of great civil unrest and violence at the height of the First Spanish Republic. Butinyà wrote a short Rule of Life for the small community, in which he envisioned them demonstrating, through their lives, that there was a fraternity in labor; they would create spaces where workers could become free and critical observers of their society. Bonifacia Rodríguez developed a deep trust in this vision and maintained a strong sense of her life as an imitation of that of St. Joseph, who worked quietly building a home in Nazareth. This was the vision that sustained her throughout her life.

This trust was needed, as the community faced the loss of Butinyà and his support when, the following April, he was expelled from Spain along with all the other members of the Society of Jesus. Though he soon wrote them from his place of exile in France, Rodríguez faced the burden alone of sustaining the community and their goal of protecting the youth of the city. She faced a huge task: the community had been formed into a religious congregation, one, however, which had chosen to root its life among the working class, sharing their life. They wanted to proclaim to the working poor, especially to women who had few options for their lives in that society, that the teachings and life of Christ were not for an abstract, moral imitation, but a way to take their proper place in a Christian society.

The Republic fell a year after the Congregation was formed and the monarchy returned to power. A period of peace came to the nation as a result. The Church felt secure again and sought to return to traditional modes of operation. A new Bishop of Salamanca was installed, Narciso Martínez y Izquierdo, who immediately looked to invigorate the structures and organizations of the Church. Among these was the life of the religious communities of the city. He grasped and supported the vision of the Josephite Servants. With this time of peace and official support, the number of Servants grew, and they expanded their ministry to reach out to those they had been unable to reach previously.

In 1878, the bishop appointed Don Pedro García y Repila as the new Director of the Congregation. García did not appreciate either the vision of the Josephites or the contributions of Mother Bonifacia. She began to see herself excluded from decisions regarding the life of the Congregation, just at the time when the growing number of women who were joining the congregation were motivated not by the Consecrated Life but more with the security and propriety of a traditional convent.

Three years later, the Congregation moved from the working-class neighborhood where Bonificia had lived her entire life to a large, old house which was in total disrepair. The Servants named it the House of St. Teresa. They continued to work, though, with the members of the Josephite Association which Rodríguez had founded in her first days of religious commitment. This collaboration continued to prove fruitful to both groups in working their missions.

== Expansion and division ==
Butinyà's period of exile had ended with the return of the monarchy, so he returned to his native Catalunya. From there he began to write to Mother Bonifacia to urge her to expand the Congregation. For various reasons, she was not able to comply with his repeated requests. Thus, in February 1875, Butinyà established a community of Servants on his own in that region of the country. This soon grew to several houses.

A union of the Catalan houses with that in Salamanca was proposed by Butinyà in 1882. This time, in response to this, Mother Bonifacia was able to travel to that region to begin the process for this. After her visit to the different houses to meet and get to know the Catalan Sisters, she met Butinyà in Zaragoza. While there, she received a letter from the community in Salamanca, in which the writer had signed herself as "Superior". Thus Rodríguez received notice of her removal from office. Upon her return to the house, she encountered only rejection and insults. Deciding that there was no good way to deal with this situation, Rodríguez petitioned the bishop to establish a new house of the Congregation in the city of Zamora. She left Salamanca with her mother on July 25, 1883, never to live there again.

In that period, Zamora was far more of an agricultural environment that Salamanca. The pair found hospitality with a local priest, Felipe González, who had known and supported their work in Salamanca. Nevertheless, Mother Bonifacia felt weak and useless. Her mother was her real support in that transition. Within a week, a novice from Salamanca, and a new candidate, Soccoro Hernández, joined her. The latter was to become her faithful companion.

By November of that year, the small group was able to establish their own home in the city, where they began again to establish the project, setting up a workshop whereby they could earn their living and providing a gathering place for their collaborators in the mission. They were desperately poor, but persevered. In the meantime, they received frequent communications from Butinyà, who encouraged them in their perseverance.

Back in Salamanca, García Repila was leading the Congregation there away from the commitment to manual labor which Butinyà and Rodríguez had seen as fundamental to their way of life, both spiritually and in identifying with their neighbors. This advanced to the point where, in August 1884, Bishop Martínez modified the Constitutions written in 1882 by Butinyà to remove this as an element of their daily lives. Rodríguez and Butinyà continued writing them frequently, but their only reply was silence. At that point, Rodríguez decided that the only future lay with the proposed union with the Catalan houses.

She made another trip to Catalunya in 1886, accompanied by Sister Soccoro. Following this, she made a visit to the House of St. Teresa in Salamanca, to see one last time if a complete union of all the communities might be possible. She saw that there was a total lack of interest in this on the part of the Sisters in Salamanca. Thus the proposed union never came to be. The Catalan communities went on to form an independent congregation, the Daughters of St. Joseph.

== A new foundation ==
Despite the obstacles they endured, the small community in Zamora was able to obtain a larger house. Donations from friends of Father Butinyà enable them to buy new equipment for their work. In this new house, they were able to expand to the point where this industrial work was able to sustain not only the Servants, but the young girls they had begun to take in and teach a trade. They used this building as a center of industrial training and development of the minds and hearts of their young charges.

On July 2, 1901, the Congregation received formal Papal approbation by Pope Leo XIII. Publication of this led many priests of the diocese to contact the Servants to congratulate them. Noticeable in the silence was any word from the House of St. Teresa. On November 15 of that same year, the entire community signed a letter to them, seeking some way of maintaining the bonds between the two groups. On December 7, the current Superior, Luisa Huerta, replied. She wrote that there were no documents indicating any such connection between them, and claimed that it was Rodríguez herself who had walked out of the community.

Mother Bonifacia decided to make one final attempt to achieve a reconciliation. She went personally to Salamanca. There she was denied admission and ignored by the members of the community. She returned to Zamora and continued her life there, quietly working with the young girls and women of the city. She died on 8 August 1905.

== Legacy ==
Apart from Spain, the Servants of St. Joseph currently (2010) also have communities in Argentina, Bolivia, Peru, Chile, Colombia, Cuba, Italy, Philippines, Papua New Guinea, and Vietnam. Four books have been published by the sisters.

=== The Philippines ===
Upon the invitation of Mons. James McCloskey, the Bishop of Jaro, Iloilo, the SSJ Sisters came to the Philippines in May 1932 and established themselves in San Jose, Antique. A year later, they moved to Silay City, Negros Occidental, where they established St. Theresita's Academy, until today the only private, Catholic secondary school in the city. The SSJ Philippine Province of the Holy Family has different communities in the Visayas and Luzon. They also established Holy Family School of Quezon City Inc., which is an exclusive Catholic School in Quezon City, Philippines. The SSJ Philippine Province of the Holy Family also has different missionary communities in Papua New Guinea and Vietnam.

=== Bonifacia declared a saint ===
In 2011, the Holy See announced that Mother Bonifacia would be canonized on October 23.

== See also ==
- Holy Family
- Saint Joseph
- Sisters of St. Joseph
- Society of Jesus
