= Silay North Elementary School =

Public elementary school in Negros Occidental, Philippines

- SNES

Location
- Rizal Street; Silay City, Negros Occidental; Philippines
- Coordinates: 10°47′57″N 122°58′29″E

Information
- School type: Public School
- Established: 1907
- Campus type: Urban
- Color: Red

Silay North Elementary School is a public school in Silay City, Philippines. It is located beside the Silay City Public Plaza and a meter away from the San Diego Cathedral Church.

== History ==
Silay North Elementary School was established in 1907. It was an offshoot of the Gabaldon Act in 1970, which gave insular aid for the construction of a public school in every municipality of the Philippines. The school was actually a one-story concrete building, which now houses the intermediate classes. A two-story private house in the primary building was utilized by the city government to accommodate other classes. Last 2006, the primary building that comprised sixteen classrooms was vacated as per advised by the City Engineer's Office of Silay City after inspection.

After World War II, a modern toilet was constructed for boys and girls, and a separate building for a lunch counter. During the early terms of President Ferdinand E. Marcos, a Marcos type of classroom building was further added to accommodate more classes. On account of the limited school area, few buildings were added, such as a computer laboratory and some classrooms for the Grade 1 students, which were all donated by the Chinese Chambers of Commerce and Industry.

During the Japanese occupation, the primary building was used as the Japanese garrison. The Japanese government opened the school for school children who ere left in the town. When the American forces liberated the town, the 51st Division of the US Army also occupied some of the building; the primary building was made into an Infirmary area, while the intermediate building was turned into living quarters and a mess hall.

== Present ==
At present, Silay North Elementary School has seventeen permanent buildings, including the comfort rooms and those that are dilapidated. However, due to shortage of classrooms, sections were fused from seven to eight to five over six sections only.

== See also ==
- Doña Montserrat Lopez Memorial High School
- Governor Emilio Gaston Memorial Elementary School
- Don Estaquio Hofileña Memorial Elementary School
- Silay City
