= Governor Emilio Gaston Memorial Elementary School =

Public elementary school in Negros Occidental, Philippines

- GEGMES
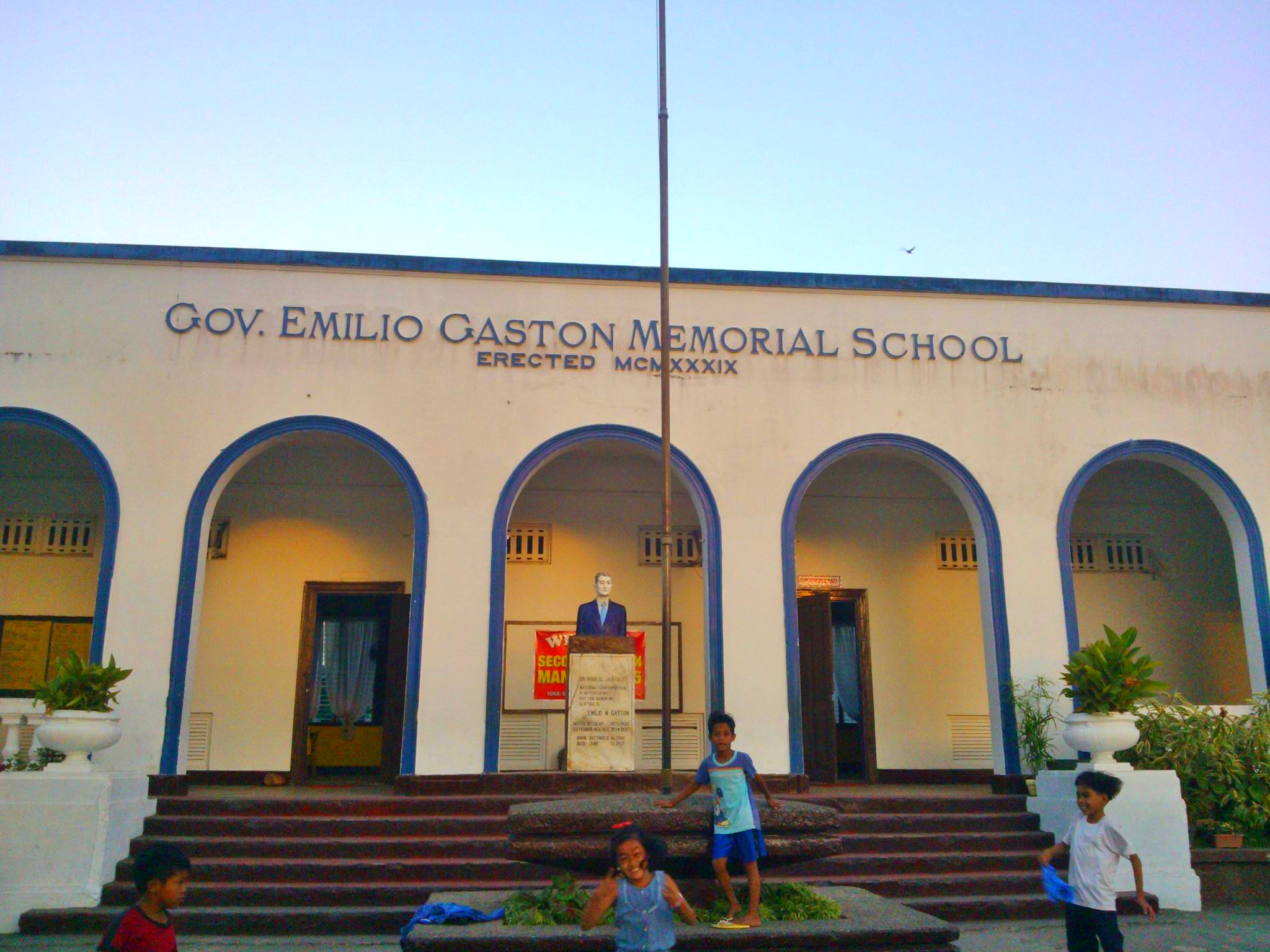
- Front edifice of the school

Location
- Rizal Street; Silay City, Negros Occidental; Philippines
- Coordinates: 10°48′16″N 122°58′44″E

Information
- Type: Public School
- Established: 1939
- Grades: Grade 1-6
- Language: English and Hiligaynon
- Campus size: 7,772 square meters
- Colours: Blue and Gold

Governor Emilio Gaston Memorial Elementary School or locally known as GEGMES is one of the public schools in Silay City. It is located at Rizal Street, next to the Doña Montserrat Lopez Memorial High School. The school was named after the late Negros Occidental governor and Silay City municipal president, Emilio Gaston.

== History ==
Established in 1939, Governor Emilio Gaston Memorial Elementary School is one of the oldest educational institutions in Silay City, Negros Occidental. The campus has a land area of 7,772 square meters. The school site was donated by the late Don Julio Ledesma, one of the most prominent families of Silay City. However, the school was named after the late provincial governor and municipal president, Emilio Gaston. In 1941–1943, during the Japanese Imperial Government's occupation in the Philippines, the school was the seat of its government and military garrison.

=== Emilio Gaston ===
A statue of the late Governor Emilio Gaston was erected at the front of the academe's library.

Emilio Gaston was the former municipal president of Silay City from 1925 to 1930. He was born on December 16, 1880, and died a day after the celebration of the charter day of Silay City on June 13, 1937. Gaston was also the governor of Negros Occidental from 1934 to 1937.

== See also ==
- Doña Montserrat Lopez Memorial High School
- Silay South Elementary School
- Don Estaquio Hofileña Memorial Elementary School
- La Purisima Concepcion Elementary School
- Silay North Elementary School
