= Bonifacia Rodríguez y Castro =

Roman Catholic saint (1837–1905)

Saint Bonifacia Rodríguez y Castro S.S.J.
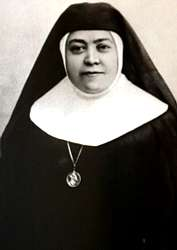

Foundress
- Born: 3 June 1837; Salamanca, Spain
- Died: 8 August 1905 (aged 68); Zamora, Spain
- Venerated in: Roman Catholic Church
- Beatified: 9 November 2003, St. Peter's Basilica by Pope John Paul II
- Canonized: 23 October 2011, Rome by Pope Benedict XVI
- Attributes: Co-foundress of the Servants of St. Joseph

Bonifacia Rodríguez y Castro (6 June 1837 – 8 August 1905) was the co-foundress of the Religious Congregation of the Servants of St. Joseph, who developed the "Nazareth workshop" as both a new format for consecrated life and to help poor and unemployed women. They were an innovative foundation of Religious Sisters in Spain in the nineteenth century.

== Foundation ==
Rodríguez was born in Salamanca, Spain, on 6 June 1837, in a small home on Las Mazas Street near the ancient University, to Juan Rodríguez and María Natalia Castro who were devout and pious people. Her father was a tailor and the family was very poor, frequently having to move because he was unable to pay the rent. From a very young age, Bonifacia helped her father with his craft in his small shop, by sewing some of the work he was able to get, as well as caring for her younger siblings.

After completing a basic schooling, Rodríguez began to work as a ropemaker. Later, in 1865 after the marriage of her sister, the only surviving sibling, she was able to set up a small workshop in the family home for making rope, lace and various other items. In this way, Rodríguez lived a quiet life with her now-widowed mother, one in which she was able to grow and deepen her faith, meditating and praying throughout the daily routine.

After five years as an independent artisan, in 1870 Rodríguez met a newly arrived priest from Catalonia, Francesc Xavier Butinyà i Hospital. Butinyà was from a family of factory owners, but he had a vision of responding to the needs of the growing working class which had arisen from the Industrial Revolution, a vision which was far ahead of the Catholic Church leaders of the day. He preached that work was a way for all to become more free and equal in society, and also a means of witness to the teachings of the Gospel. Rodríguez and her mother attended daily Masses at the nearby Jesuit Church of La Clerecía where Butinyà preached, and Rodríguez decided that this priest was the one to guide her in her spiritual search.

Rodríguez opened her workshop as a meeting place for gatherings for working women like herself, both for socializing and for times of reflection on the themes and issues of the day. They invited Butinyà to these gatherings, and under his guidance they established themselves as the Association of the Immaculate Conception and St. Joseph. Gradually Rodríguez felt herself called to religious life in a convent, and finally decided to enter a local one. Butinyà, however, saw in her the model he envisioned of a woman who could imitate the quiet life of service and prayer which Christ himself had followed in his home in Nazareth, with Mary, his mother, and Joseph. He therefore proposed to her that she take a radically different path, one in which a community of religious women could respond to the situation of poor, working women, who had such severely limited opportunities in life, a response based on their mutual reality of earning their daily living through industrial work.

== A new congregation ==
Rodríguez took up the challenge along with her mother and five other members of the Association, who then moved into the small Rodríguez home to form a religious community, with her as their leader. They took the name Servants of St. Joseph, to show their identification with him as the primary laborer in the Holy Family, and also seeking his protection. They took religious vows on 10 January 1874. Three days before, on 7 January, the Bishop of Salamanca, Don Joaquin Lluch y Garriga (1816-1882), had signed the Decree of Erection of the religious institute. A Catalan like Butinyà, he had supported with great enthusiasm the new foundation from the start.

This community came into being at a very troubled time in Spanish history, one of great civil unrest and violence at the height of the First Spanish Republic. Butinyà, who is honored as their co-founder, wrote a short Rule of Life for the small community, in which he envisioned their demonstrating, through their lives, that there was a fraternity in labour, and they could create spaces where workers could become free and critical observers of their society in the light of the Gospel. Rodríguez developed deep trust in this vision, and maintained a strong sense of her life in imitation of Joseph, who worked quietly building a home in Nazareth. This was the vision which was to sustain her throughout her life.

This trust was needed, as the community faced the loss of Lluch and his support, when, within days of their foundation, he was transferred to the new post of Bishop of Barcelona. Then came the loss of Butinyà with his guidance when, the following April, he was expelled from Spain along with all the other members of the Society of Jesus, due to the anti-clerical laws of the Republic. Though he soon wrote them from his place of exile in France, Rodríguez faced the burden alone of sustaining the community and their goal of protecting the youth of the city. She faced a huge task: the community had been formed into a religious congregation, one, however, which had chosen to root its life among the working class, sharing their life. They wanted to proclaim to the working poor that, especially for women who had few options for their lives in that society, the teachings and life of Christ were not for an abstract, moralistic imitation, but were a guide to their taking their proper place in a Christian society.

The Republic fell less than a year after the Congregation had formed, and the monarchy was returned to power. A period of peace came to the nation as a result. The Catholic Church felt secure again and sought to return to traditional modes of operation. A new Bishop of Salamanca was installed, Narciso Martínez e Izquierdo, who immediately looked to invigorate the structures and organizations of the church. Among these was the life of the religious communities of the city. He grasped and supported the vision of the Josephite Servants. With this time of peace and official support, the number of Servants grew, and they expanded their ministry to reach out to those they had been unable to reach previously.

Many of the clergy of the city did not share the enthusiasm of their bishops, however, and felt scandalized by this innovation of having religious women laboring in a workshop like any other person of the working class. In 1878, the bishop appointed Don Pedro García y Repila as the new Director of the Congregation. García was one who did not appreciate either the vision of the Josephites or the contributions of Rodríguez. She began to see herself excluded from decisions regarding the life of the Congregation, just at the time when the growing number of Servants was bringing in women who identified consecrated life with the security and propriety of a traditional convent, and began to oppose the element of industrial work as a basis of their way of life.

Three years later, the Congregation moved from the working-class neighborhood where Rodríguez had lived her entire life to a large, old house which was in total disrepair. The Servants named it the House of St. Teresa. They continued to work, though, with the members of the Josephite Association which Rodríguez had founded in her first days of religious commitment. This collaboration continued to prove fruitful to both groups in working their missions.

== Expansion and division ==
Butinyà's period of exile had ended with the return of the monarchy, but he had returned to his native Catalonia. From there he began to write to Rodríguez, urging her to go there in order to expand the Congregation. For various reasons, she was not able to comply with his repeated requests. Thus, in February 1875, Butinyà established a community of Sisters on his own in that region of the country, following the pattern he had helped establish in Castile. Soon there were several new communities of the Servants of St. Joseph in that region. They remained canonically separate from the community in Salamanca, however.

A union of the Catalan communities with the community in Salamanca was once more proposed by Butinyà in 1882. This time, Rodríguez was able to fulfill his repeated requests and was able to travel to that region, in order to begin the process for a possible merger. After her visit to the different houses there, whereby she was able to meet and get to know the Catalan Sisters, she stopped in Zaragoza to consult with Butinyà. While there, she received a letter from the community in Salamanca, in which the writer had signed herself as "Superior". Thus Rodríguez received notice of her removal from office. Upon her return to the house, she encountered only rejection and insults. Deciding that there was no good way to deal with this situation, Rodríguez petitioned the bishop to establish a new house of the Congregation of Servants of St. Joseph in the city of Zamora. She left Salamanca with her mother on 25 July 1883, never to live there again.

The pair found hospitality in Zamora with a local priest, Felipe González, who had known and supported their work in Salamanca. Nevertheless, Rodríguez felt weak and useless. In that period, Zamora was far more of an agricultural environment that Salamanca, and the move required a complete re-evaluation of the process she had started in Salamanca. Her mother was her main support in that period of transition. Within a week of their arrival, however, a novice from Salamanca, and a new candidate, Soccoro Hernández, joined her. The latter was to become her faithful companion.

By November of that year, the small group was able to establish their own home in the city, where they began again to establish the project, setting up a workshop whereby they could earn their living, and which would provide a gathering place for their collaborators in the mission. They were desperately poor, but persevered. In the meantime, they received frequent communications from Butinyà, who encouraged them in their perseverance.

Back in Salamanca, García y Repila was leading the community there away from the commitment to manual labor which Butinyà and Rodríguez had seen as fundamental to their way of life, both spiritually and in identifying with their neighbors. This advanced to the point where, in August 1884, Bishop Martínez modified the Constitutions written in 1882 by Butinyà to remove this as an element of their daily lives. Both Rodríguez and Butinyà continued writing them frequently, but the sole reply they received was silence. At that point, Rodríguez decided that the only future lay with the proposed union with the Catalan congregation.

She made another trip to Catalonia in 1886, accompanied by Hernández. Following this, she made a visit to the House of St. Teresa in Salamanca, in a final attempt at a complete union of all the communities. She saw that there was a total lack of interest for this among the Sisters in Salamanca. Thus the proposed union never came to be. The Catalan communities became an independent Congregation, calling themselves the Daughters of St. Joseph, and Zamora became the new cradle of the Servants of St. Joseph.

== A new foundation ==
Despite the obstacles they endured, the small community in Zamora was able to obtain a larger house. Donations from friends of Butinyà had let them buy new and improved equipment for their work. In this new house, they were able to expand to the point where this industrial work was able to sustain not only the Servants, but the young girls they had begun to take in and teach a trade. They used this building to be a center of industrial training and development of the minds and hearts of their young charges.

On 1 July 1901, the Congregation received formal Papal approbation by Pope Leo XIII. Publication of this led many priests of the diocese to contact the Servants to congratulate them. Noticeable in the silence was any word from the House of St. Teresa, which had been specifically excluded from the papal decree. On 15 November of that same year, the entire community in Zamora signed a letter to them, seeking some way of maintaining the bonds between the two groups. On 7 December, the current superior in Salamanca, Luisa Huerta, replied. She wrote that there were no documents indicating any such connection between them, and claimed that it was Rodríguez herself who had walked out of the community.

Rodríguez decided to make one final attempt to achieve a reconciliation. She went personally to Salamanca. There she was denied admission and ignored by the members of the community. Rodríguez kept this sorrow to herself the rest of her life, only pouring it out gently in her journal with these words: “I shall neither return to the land where I was born nor to this beloved House of Saint Teresa”. Again silence sealed her lips, so that the community of Zamora learned of what happened only after her death. Thus she returned to Zamora and continued her life there, quietly working with the young girls and women of the city. She died on 8 August 1905.

== Legacy ==
As Rodríguez had predicted, the house in Salamanca joined the Congregation in 1907, after her death. Currently, the Servants of St. Joseph serve in ten countries of the world: in addition to its birthplace of Spain, they are in Cuba, throughout South America, also in the Democratic Republic of the Congo, the Philippines, Papua New Guinea and Vietnam. They continue their work in the model set by Rodríguez, establishing industrial centers for training young women and guiding them in becoming witnesses to the Gospel in their societies.

== Veneration ==
Pope John Paul II beatified Rodríguez on 9 November 2003 in Rome. In 2011, the Holy See announced that Pope Benedict XVI had authorized that Rodríguez be canonized, with the date set for 23 October.

== See also ==
- Servants of St. Joseph
- Francesc Xavier Butinyà i Hospital

== Sources ==
- Servants of St. Joseph (in Spanish)
- Vatican News "Bonifacia Rodriguez Castro"
