= Francesc Xavier Butinyà i Hospital =

Spanish Jesuit missionary priest

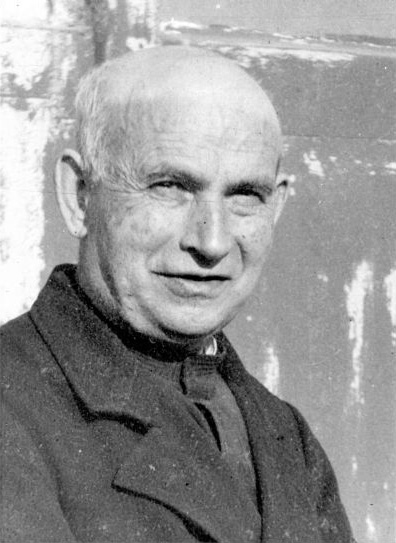
- Born: April 16, 1834; Banyoles, Catalonia, Spain
- Died: December 18, 1899 (aged 65); Tarragona, Catalonia, Spain
- Other names: Francisco Javier Butiñá y Hospital
- Occupations: Jesuit missionary, writer and preacher
- Known for: founding the Servants of St. Joseph and the Daughters of St. Joseph

Francesc Xavier Butinyà i Hospital (April 16, 1834 in Banyoles – December 18, 1899 in Tarragona) was a Spanish missionary Jesuit from Catalonia, teacher and writer and the founder of two religious congregations of Sisters. He was the son of a prosperous factory owner. Nevertheless, at the height of the Industrial Revolution in Spain, he was an early proponent of the natural connection of the Christian faith with the working class, who were suffering in miserable working and living conditions.

On January 10, 1874 he founded the religious congregation of the Servants of St. Joseph in Salamanca, Spain, together with Saint Bonifacia Rodríguez y Castro. She was from a very poor background and had lived supporting herself as a ropemaker, when she met him. The congregation they founded was to live in the same manner as Jesus and St. Joseph, in their home in Nazareth, while simultaneously helping their neighbors, especially women, realize the realities of their lives in the light of the Gospel, that they might be free and critical members of their society.

In April of that same year, as a result of the anti-clerical decrees of the First Spanish Republic, he was expelled from Spain along with the entire Society of Jesus, of which he was a member. He continued to support the community in Salamanca through correspondence. After the fall of the Republic at the end of the year and the re-establishment of the Spanish monarchy, he was able to return. At that time, he settled in his native region of Catalonia.

He continued his preaching of his vision of a proletariat Catholicism, even though the hierarchy of the Roman Catholic Church sought to re-establish its position as a bulwark of stability as it had been for centuries past. He remained in correspondence with Mother Bonifacia during this time, urging her to come to Catalonia to establish communities of the Servants of St. Joseph there. This she was unable to do at the time, partly due to the still unsettled times.

As a consequence, in February 1875 Butinyà founded several houses of Religious Sisters himself in that region. He continued to urge Rodríguez to come and establish a formal connection of these communities with the original community in Salamanca which she headed. The Reverend Mother finally set out for Catalonia in 1882 for this purpose. During a stay in Zaragoza to consult with Butinyà, while on her way back to Salamanca, Mother Bonifacia received a letter from the community in Salamanca, which was signed by a member there who called herself the Religious Superior of the community. Subsequent efforts at reconciliation with that community proved fruitless, and Rodríguez had to start over in another city.

As another result of this chain of events, the communities Butinyà had founded in Catalonia decided not to proceed with any union with the Castilian communities. They formed themselves into a new congregation, the Daughters of St. Joseph in 1885.

On November 15, 2006, at the joint petition of the two Religious Congregations of Sisters he had founded, the Congregation for the Causes of Saints in Rome accepted the request to start the process of Fr. Butinyà's canonization.

== Published works ==
- Un tractat de mecànica. Observacions meteorològiques. Butlletí mensual Observatori de l'Havana (1860)
- La Venjança del Martre: Peça de Sant Martirià (1996) Introducció i notes Júlia Butinyà. Centre d’Estudis Comarcals de Banyoles (1871)
- Les Migdiades del mes de Maig (1871)
- La Devota Artesana (1878)
- Un granet de mostassa (1879)
- Constitucions de les Serventes de Sant Josep (1881)
- Joia del cristià (1882)
- Algunes flors del jardí obrer (1895)

== See also ==
- Servants of St. Joseph
- Filles de Sant Josep (in Catalan)
- Bonifacia Rodriguez y Castro
