= Silay =

Component city in Negros Occidental, Philippines

- Component city
- City of Silay
- San Diego Pro-Cathedral Silay City Hall Silay Town Proper

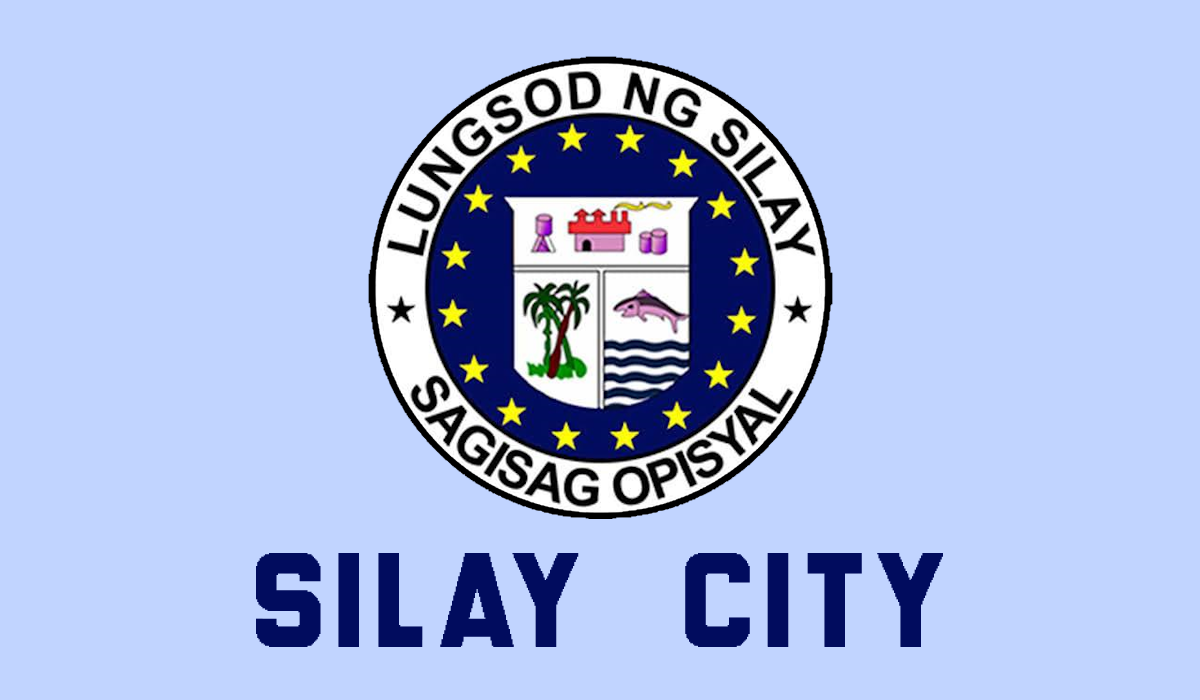
- Flag Seal
- Nicknames: "The Paris of Negros" "The Visayan Marseille"
- Anthem: Silaynon Song
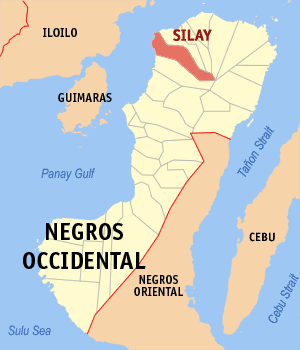
- Map of Negros Occidental with Silay highlighted
- Interactive map of Silay
- Location within the Philippines
- Coordinates: 10°48′N 122°58′E
- Country: Philippines
- Region: Negros Island Region
- Province: Negros Occidental
- District: 3rd district
- Founded: 1565
- Cityhood: June 12, 1957
- Named for: Cratoxylum sumatranum (locally called Kansilay)
- Barangays: 16 (see Barangays)

Government
  - Type: Sangguniang Panlungsod
  - Mayor: Joedith C. Gallego
  - Vice Mayor: Thomas Maynard J. Ledesma (Ind)
  - Representative: Javier Miguel L. Benitez (PFP)
  - City Council: Members: Andrew John D. Penuela; Darryl F. Hinolan; Lorenzo Luiz L. Locsin; Michael S. Maravilla; Jose J. Lopez, Jr.; Michael Thomas D. Velez; Romela J. Amoroso; Chris Paolo L. Tiongco; Lyndon Q. Bernardo; James Anthony Marie M. Golez
  - Electorate: 90,213 voters (2025)

Area
  - Total: 214.80 km^{2} (82.93 sq mi)
- Elevation: 57 m (187 ft)
- Highest elevation: 1,398 m (4,587 ft)
- Lowest elevation: 0 m (0 ft)

Population (2024 census)
  - Total: 136,802
  - Density: 636.88/km^{2} (1,649.5/sq mi)
  - Households: 32,693
- Demonym: Silaynon

Economy
  - Income class: 3rd city income class
  - Poverty incidence: 19.3% (2023)
  - Revenue: ₱ 1,087 million (2024)
  - Assets: ₱ 1,662 million (2023, 2024)
  - Expenditure: ₱ 1,136 million (2024)
  - Liabilities: ₱ 613.6 million (2023, 2024)

Service provider
  - Electricity: Negros Electric and Power Corporation (NEPC)
- Time zone: UTC+8 (PST)
- ZIP code: 6116, 6117 (Silay Hawaiian Central)
- PSGC: 064526000
- IDD : area code: +63 (0)34
- Native languages: Hiligaynon; Tagalog
- Website: www.silaycity.gov.ph

Silay, officially the City of Silay (Hiligaynon: Dakbanwa/Syudad sang Silay; Filipino: Lungsod ng Silay), is a component city in the province of Negros Occidental, Philippines. According to the 2024 census, it has a population of 136,802 people.

Silay is often referred to as the "Paris of Negros" due to its artists, cultural shows and large collection of perfectly preserved heritage houses. More than thirty of these houses have been declared by the National Historical Commission of the Philippines as part of the Silay National Historical Landmark. In 2015, the city celebrated its 58th charter anniversary.

== Etymology ==
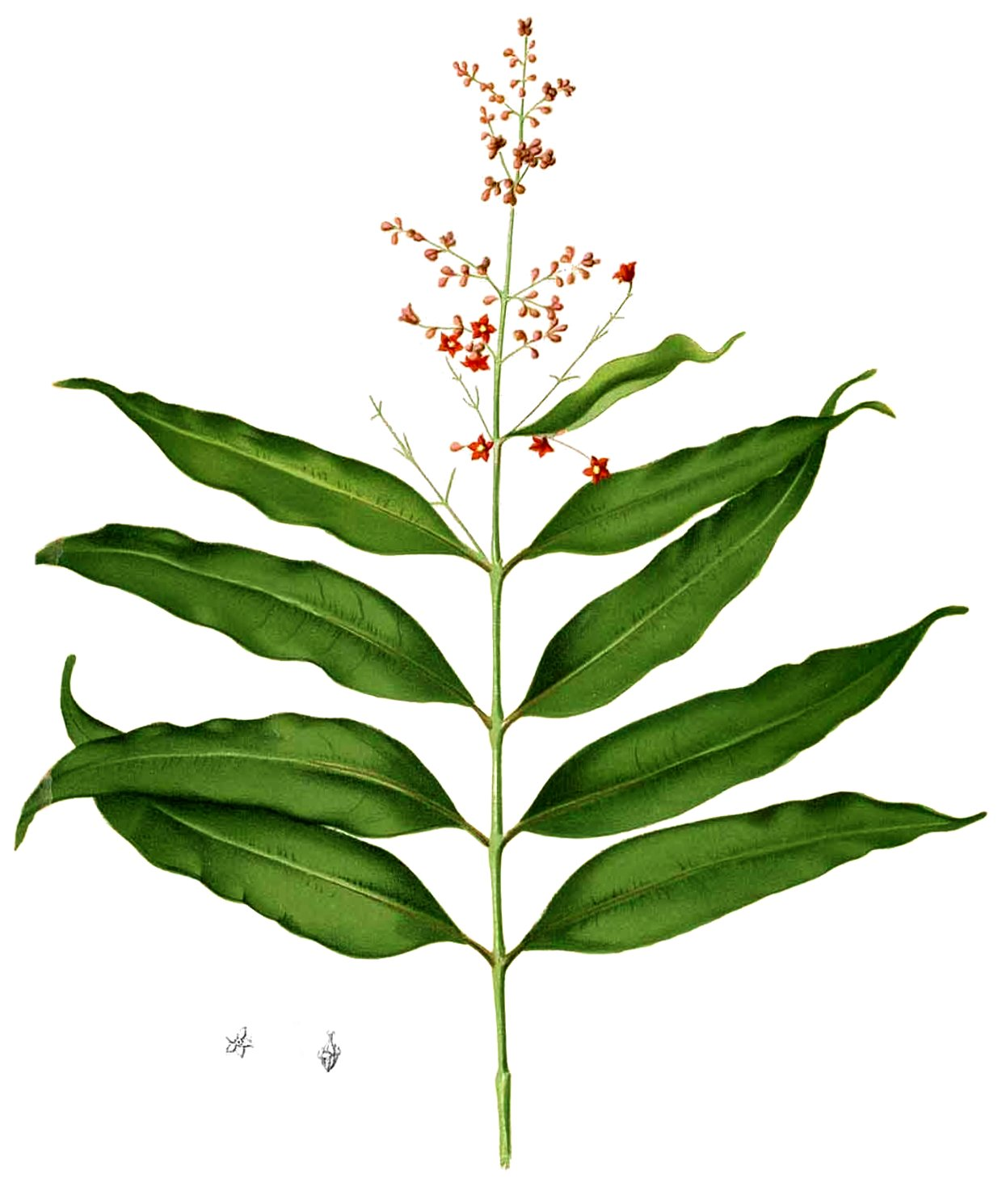
Cratoxylum sumatranum, known as kansilay in Bisaya

The appellation Silay is derived from the name of a native tree which grew abundantly in the area. The kansilay is the city's official tree.

=== The Legend of Princess Kansilay ===
According to local legend, Silay City derives its name from a princess named Kansilay who lived during the era of the datus and rajahs. When pirates attacked the settlement, the princess courageously led the villagers in defense, fighting fiercely with a talibong, a short native single-edged sword. Although the pirates were defeated, Kansilay lost her life in the battle. Her beloved arrived too late to save her, and the villagers buried her with great care. From her grave grew the first Kansilay tree, which came to symbolize her bravery and sacrifice, giving the city its name. Murals once displayed in public buildings depict her as a formidable warrior wielding the talibong.

== History ==
=== Spanish colonization ===
Silay was first settled in 1565, under the name "Carobcob", which means "to scratch" in Kinaray-a; residents of the settlement relied upon harvesting tuway clams, which involved "scratching" (or raking) the sands for the mollusks at low tide, as a means of livelihood. In early writings, the settlement was also referred to as "Calubcub", "Caracol" and "Caraco". The last two variations mean "snail" or a "spiral" in Spanish. Carobcob was built near the mouth of a creek; nothing is left of the village today. Carobcob was granted as an encomienda to Cristobal Nuñez Paroja, one of the seventeen soldiers of Miguel López de Legazpi on January 25, 1571.

In the second half of the century, Moro slave raiders escalated their incursions on the large island, forcing the Corregidor of Negros to adopt the policy of flight rather than resistance. People left their homes sometime in 1760 and settled in a new location between two small rivers, Matagoy and Panaogao. A paloisades or estacada (Spanish for "palisade" or "stockade") was constructed to protect the populace from Moro raiders. The place is now known as Sitio Estaca, its name derived from the Spanish word estacada.

In 1760, Silay was recognized as a town being referred to in a letter from Governor Juan Jose de Mijares (1772–1775) mentioning Silay as a leading town in the north. In 1776, the bishop of Cebu considered Silay as the center of the parish. In 1760, it became a pueblo or town. By the year 1818, it became a flourishing community of over 204 houses. Furthermore, the town was settled by 23 Spanish-Filipino families. By 1896, it had become a leading sugar-producing area because of the Horno Economico (sugar mill) built in 1846 by a Frenchman who became a permanent resident of Silay, Yves Leopold Germain Gaston, the sugar mill he built is the first mechanized sugar mill in the Philippines.

=== Negros Revolution ===
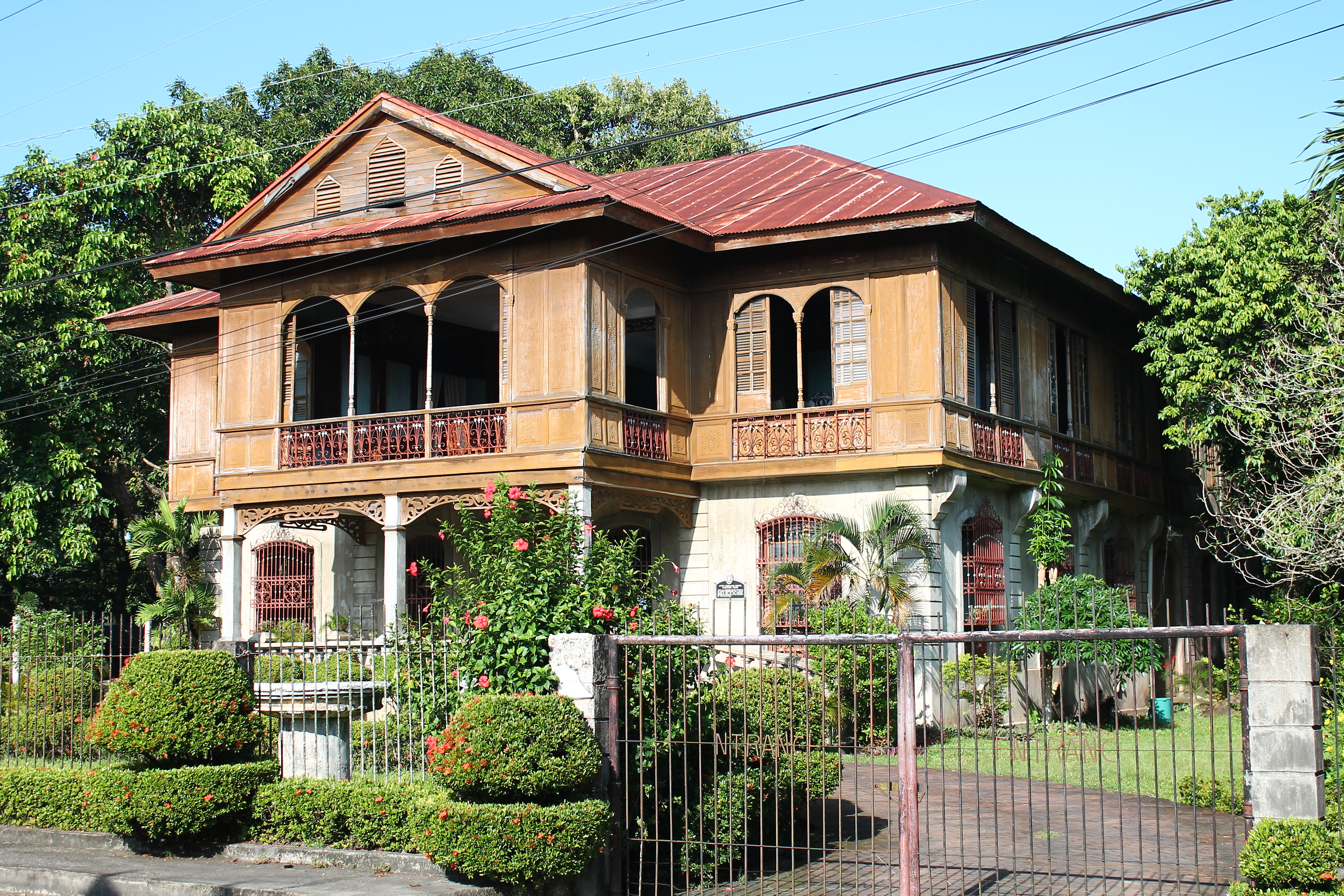
Balay Negrense on Cinco de Noviembre Street

With the outbreak of the Revolution of 1896 came a division between the sugarcane planters of Silay and the clergy. Some planters and clergy supported the rebels while others were against the revolution. On November 5, 1898, at about 2:00 in the afternoon, residents of Silay gathered in the street corner now known as Cinco de Noviembre Street and from there they proceeded to the Spanish garrison near the Catholic Church. The encounter was bloodless. The Spanish civil guard commander, Lt. Maximiano Correa, refused to surrender. After negotiations with the revolutionaries mediated by Juan Viaplana, a local Spaniard, the Spanish garrison did surrender. A Philippine flag was raised for the first time at the Silay plaza later that afternoon. Aniceto Lacson became president after the signing of the terms of surrender. Timoteo Unson and the group of Silay residents then marched south to join forces with some residents of Talisay for an attack on Bacolod, the capital.

=== World War II ===
On the slopes of Mt. Silay lies Patag, the site of Imperial Japan's last stand in Negros during World War II. In 1945, U.S. military forces landed in the island. The occupying forces of the Nagano Detachment of the Imperial Japanese Army retreated to Silay and proceeded up Mt. Silay to Patag. There, they established a defensive position. Military forces of the Philippine Commonwealth and soldiers of the U.S. 40th Infantry Division proceeded up the slopes of Mt. Silay with help from Filipino soldiers of the 7th, 72nd and 75th Infantry Division of the Philippine Commonwealth Army and Negrense guerrilla fighters and defeated the Japanese defenders. Today, the site is marked by a monument dedicated to the efforts which led to the liberation of the island of Negros.

=== Post-World War II ===
==== Cityhood ====
On June 12, 1957, Silay was converted into a city, by virtue of Republic Act 1621.

== Culture ==
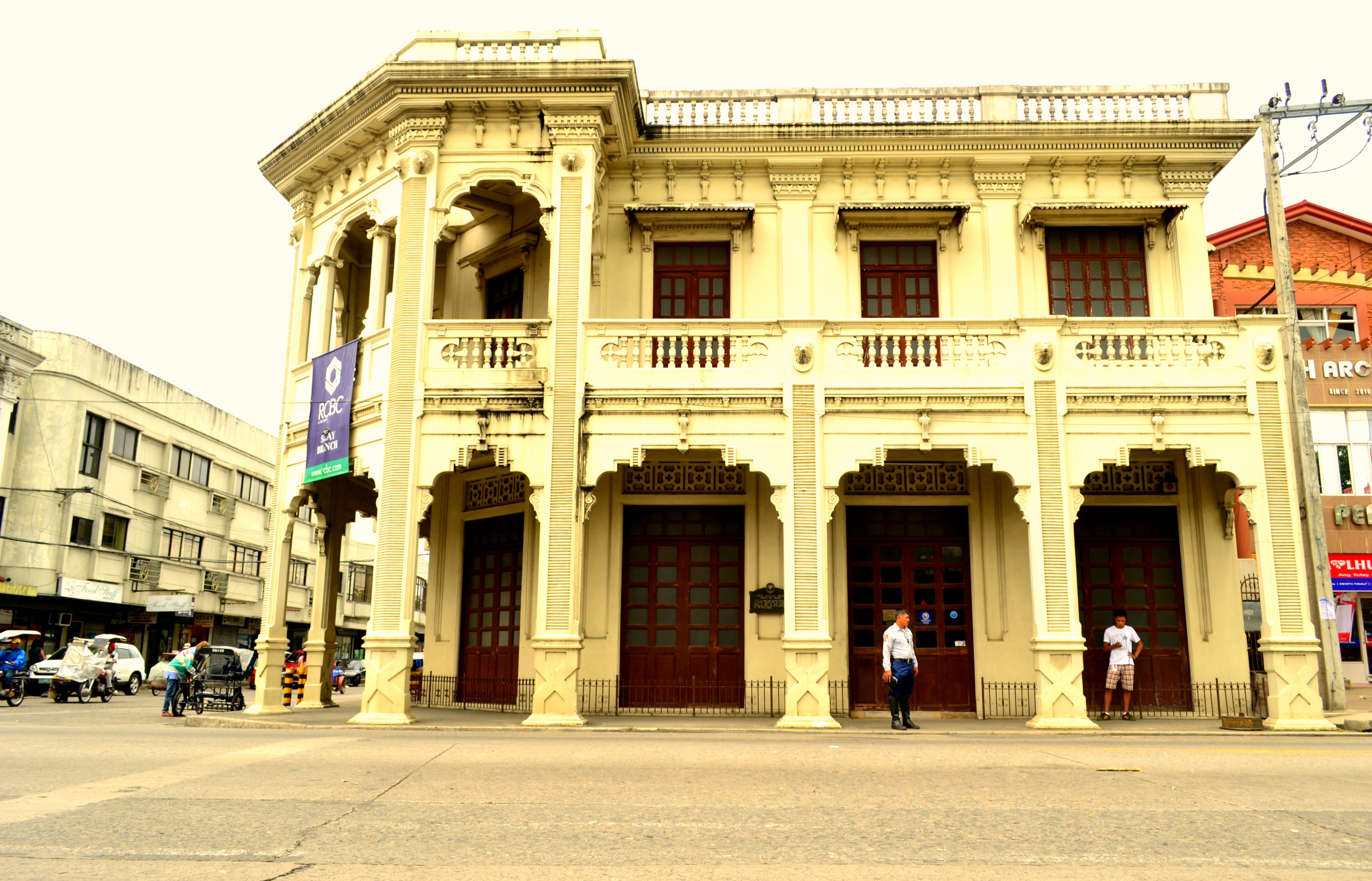
Golez Heritage House

Silay City had been known in the past as the "Paris of Negros" and the "cultural and intellectual hub of Negros" due to the residents' love for knowledge and works of art, and its collection of heritage mansions built during the height of the Philippine sugar industry's success, of which Negros was the very center. Most notable among these houses is Balay Negrense, the mansion of the son of the first Negrense sugar baron, Yves Leopold Germain Gaston and the Hofileña Ancestral House built by Manuel Severino Hofileña for his wife, former Miss Silay Gilda Ledesma Hojilla.

On June 7, 2003, Silay City became the first local government unit in the Republic of the Philippines to hold a referendum through a People's Initiative approving the 2003 annual executive budget.

Today, Silay City is listed by the Department of Tourism as one of its 25 tourist destinations in the Philippines. It is considered the seat of arts, culture and ecotourism in the Negros Island Region.

=== Kabataang Silay Ensemble Rondalla ===
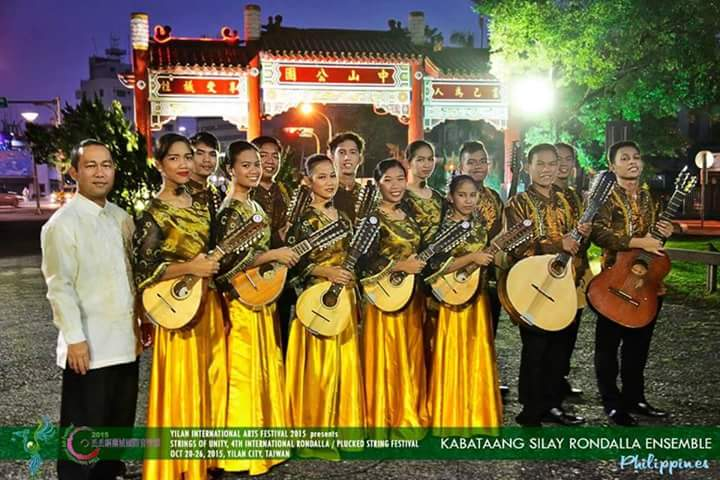
KSE Rondalla

The Kabataang Silay Ensemble Rondalla (KSE) is a rondalla group based in Silay. Through its more than 20-year history, KSE has won several regional and national musical competitions and has represented the Philippines in a number of international music festivals. Over the years, it has expanded its repertoire from folk and traditional music to classical, contemporary, pop and modern under the able leadership of conductor Jegger C. Anjao.

=== Hugyaw Kansilay Festival ===
Every 12th day of June, the city celebrates their annual festival called Hugyaw Kansilay Festival. The theme is derived from the story of Kansilay, which is also the origin of the city's name. The festival reflects the growth of Silay; from a lowly pueblo to a city that can hold its own among the country's best. The city's festival dance depicts the setting, characters, plot, sub-plots, conflict, climax and the story of the Legend of Kansilay.

== Geography ==
Silay is part of the metropolitan area called Metro Bacolod, which includes the cities of Bacolod (the metropolitan center) and Talisay. It has a sizable commercial and fishing port and is the site of the new Bacolod–Silay International Airport, which replaced the old Bacolod City Domestic Airport. It is 14 kilometres (8.7 mi) from Bacolod.

=== Barangays ===
Silay is politically subdivided into 16 barangays. Each barangay consists of puroks and some have sitios.

- Barangay I (Poblacion) (Urban Division)
- Barangay II (Poblacion) (Urban Division)
- Barangay III (cinco de Noviembre) (Poblacion) (Urban Division)
- Barangay IV (Poblacion) (Urban Division)
- Barangay V (Poblacion) (Urban Division)
- Barangay VI (Poblacion) (Hawaiian) (Rural Division)
- Eustaquio Lopez (Rural Division)
- Guimbala-on (Rural Division)
- Guinhalaran (Urban Division)
- Kapitan Ramon (Rural Division)
- Lantad (Rural Division)
- Mambulac (Urban Division)
- Rizal (Urban Division)
- Bagtic (Rural Division)
- Patag (Rural Division)
- Balaring (Rural Division)

=== Climate ===
Climate data for Silay
Month	Jan	Feb	Mar	Apr	May	Jun	Jul	Aug	Sep	Oct	Nov	Dec	Year
Mean daily maximum °C (°F)	28 (82)	29 (84)	30 (86)	32 (90)	32 (90)	31 (88)	30 (86)	29 (84)	29 (84)	29 (84)	29 (84)	28 (82)	30 (85)
Mean daily minimum °C (°F)	23 (73)	23 (73)	23 (73)	24 (75)	25 (77)	25 (77)	25 (77)	24 (75)	24 (75)	24 (75)	24 (75)	23 (73)	24 (75)
Average precipitation mm (inches)	57 (2.2)	37 (1.5)	41 (1.6)	42 (1.7)	98 (3.9)	155 (6.1)	187 (7.4)	162 (6.4)	179 (7.0)	188 (7.4)	114 (4.5)	78 (3.1)	1,338 (52.8)
Average rainy days	12.0	7.7	9.2	10.2	19.5	24.6	26.9	25.1	25.5	25.2	18.0	13.0	216.9
Source: Meteoblue

== Demographics ==
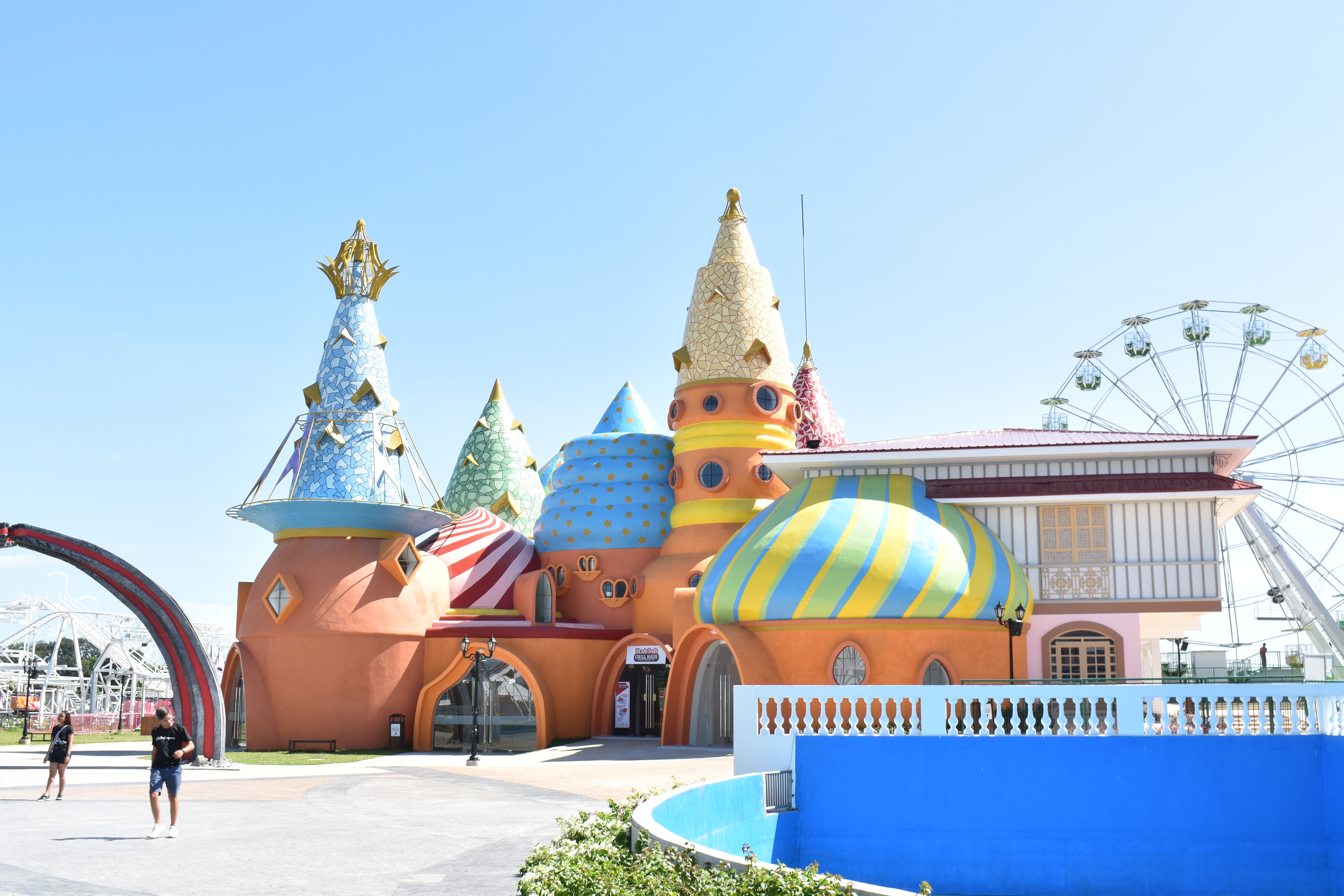
Magikland, the first outdoor theme park in the Visayas

Population census of Silay
Year	Pop.	±% p.a.
1903	25,214	—
1918	23,328	−0.52%
1939	39,483	+2.54%
1948	35,570	−1.15%
1960	60,324	+4.50%
1970	69,200	+1.38%
1975	104,887	+8.70%
1980	111,131	+1.16%
1990	101,031	−0.95%
1995	122,748	+3.72%
2000	107,722	−2.76%
2007	120,365	+1.54%
2010	120,999	+0.19%
2015	126,930	+0.92%
2020	130,478	+0.58%
2024	136,802	+1.14%
Source: Philippine Statistics Authority

== Economy ==
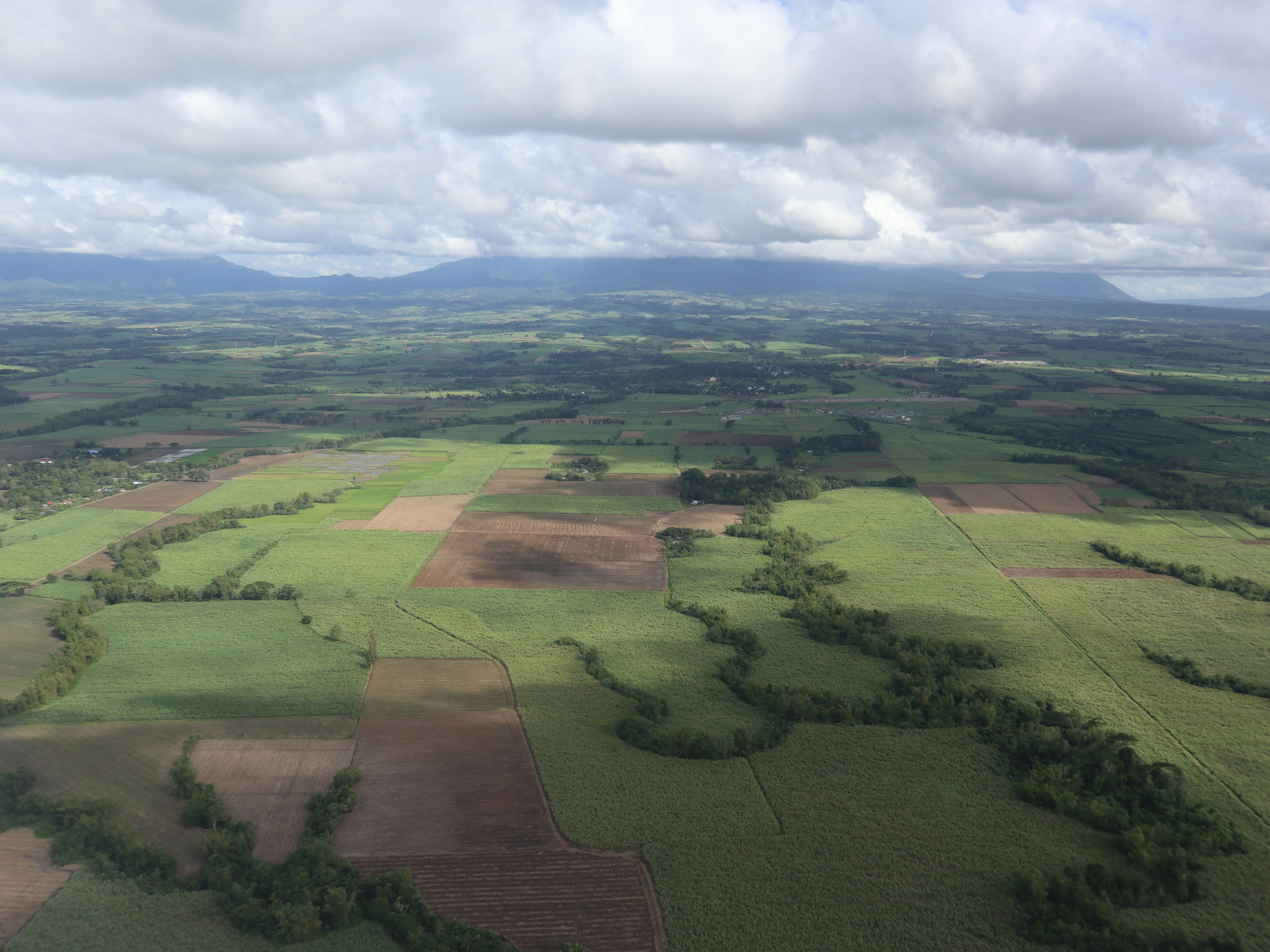
Sugar plantation in Silay

Poverty incidence of Silay (%)

Source: Philippine Statistics Authority

=== Negros Occidental Convention Center ===
Eugenio Jose Lacson led the groundbreaking of the 2-story multipurpose PHP1.03 billion Negros Occidental Convention Center in Silay. It was Mayor Albee Benitez who initiated the project near the Bacolod-Silay Airport. His brother 3rd District Rep. Jose Francisco Benitez certified the center as green building for conferences, cultural events, and social gatherings.

== Transportation ==
=== Airports ===
The Bacolod–Silay International Airport terminal building

The Bacolod–Silay International Airport, serves the whole Metro Bacolod area and surrounding places. The P4.37-billion airport is capable of handling all-weather and night-landing operations. Its 2,000-meter (6,600 ft.) long and 45-meter (148 ft.) wide primary runway, and 678-meter by 23-meter taxiways can accommodate Airbus A320 family-size aircraft, and the Boeing 737, while the apron can hold five aircraft at any one time. The runway runs in a direction of 03°/21°. Provisions for a 500-meter (1,600 ft) expansion of the present runway in order to accommodate even larger airplanes like the Airbus A330, Airbus A340 and Boeing 747 are now in place. The airport is expected to be the primary entrance by air to Negros Island Region.

Silay is 50 minutes by air from Manila, 30 minutes by air from Cebu, 1 hour by air from Cagayan de Oro and 37.2 minutes by air from General Santos. Commercial airlines operating in the Bacolod–Silay International Airport are Philippine Airlines, Cebu Pacific Air, PAL Express, and Philippines AirAsia.

== Education ==
In Silay City, there are 31 schools that are officially listed by the city's Department of Education.

=== Public schools ===
==== Elementary ====
- Silay South Elementary School
- Silay North Elementary School
- Governor Emilio Gaston Memorial Elementary School
- Barangay Mambulac Elementary School
- Guinhalaran Integrated School
- Balaring Elementary School
- Don Estaquio Hofileña Memorial School
- Villa Miranda Elementary School
- Estaquio Lopez Elementary School
- Don Homero Hilado Tanpinco Elementary School
- Patag Elementary School
- Silay SPED Center (Elementary)
- Salvacion Elementary School
- Emiliano Lizares Elementary School
- Hinicayan Elementary School
- Hawaiian-Philippine Company Elementary School
- Santo Rosario Elementary School
- La Purisima Concepcion Elementary School

=== High schools ===
- Doña Montserrat Lopez Memorial High School
- Barangay E Lopez National High School
- Barangay Guimbalaon National High School
- Don Felix T. Lacson Memorial National High School
- Doña Montserrat Lopez Memorial High School HPCO Extension
- Doña Montserrat Lopez Memorial High School Patag Extension
- Doña Montserrat Lopez Memorial High School Santo Rosario Extension
- Don Albino and Doña Dolores Jison Integrated School
- Lantawan Integrated School
- Don Serafin L. Golez Memorial Integrated School
- Napilas Integrated School
- Sibato Integrated School
- Violeta Integrated School
- Silay SPED Center
- Guinhalaran Integrated School

=== Private schools ===
- St. Theresita's Academy
- Silay Institute
- Cinco De Noviembre Learning Center
- Faith Christian Academy-Silay Incorporated
- St. Francis of Assisi of Silay Foundation Inc.
- San Diego Study Center
- Silay Hope Baptist Academy
- L'ecole Silay

=== College ===
- Roberto L. Jalandoni Silay City College established 2022

Offered three vocational courses accredited by technical education and skills development authority (TESDA)

- Computer system servicing (CSS)
- Shielded metal arc welding (SMAW)
- Electrical Installations and Maintenance System (EIMS)

== Gallery ==
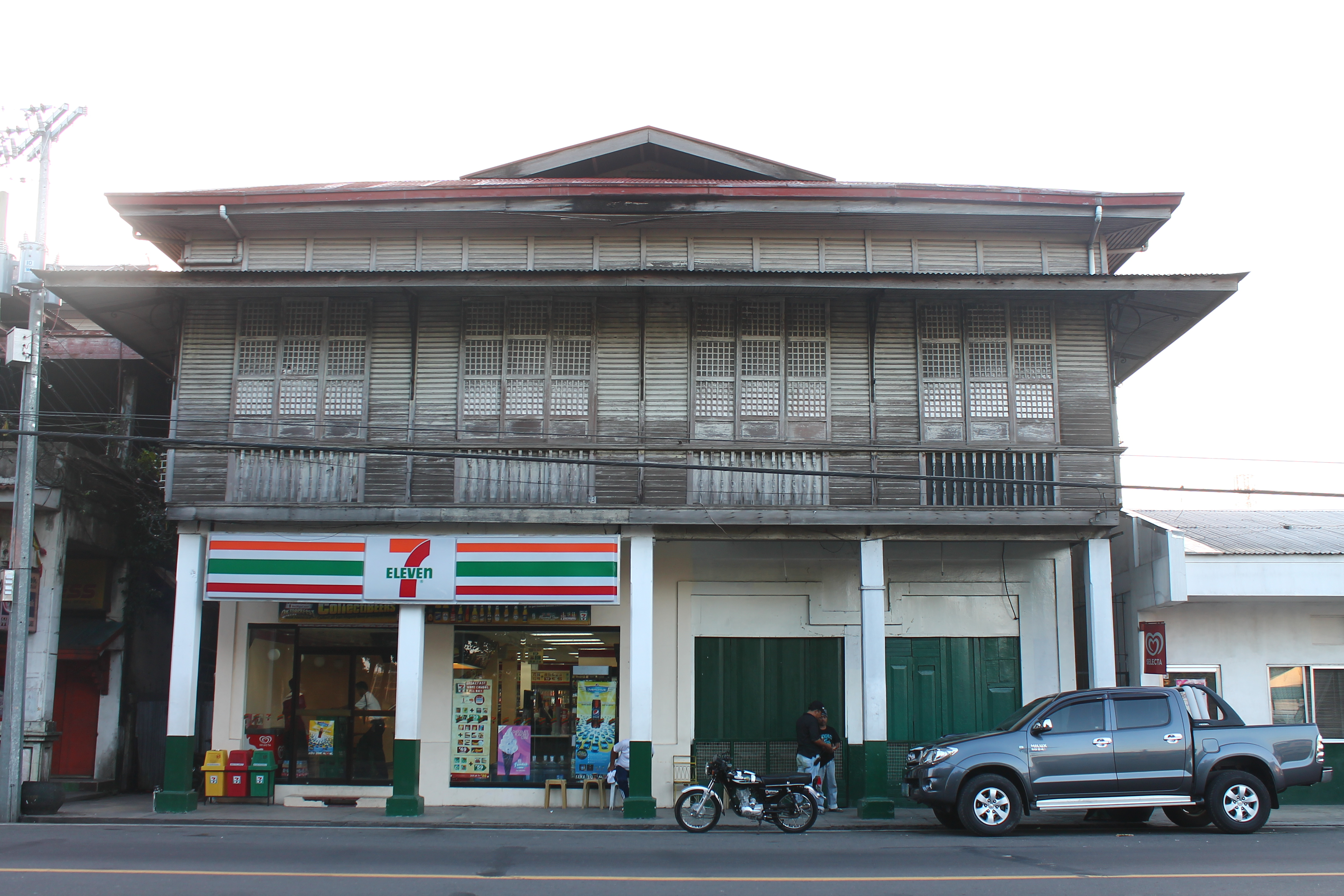
The Josefina T. Lacson Ancestral House, renowned for the 7/11 leasing underneath the clan residence.

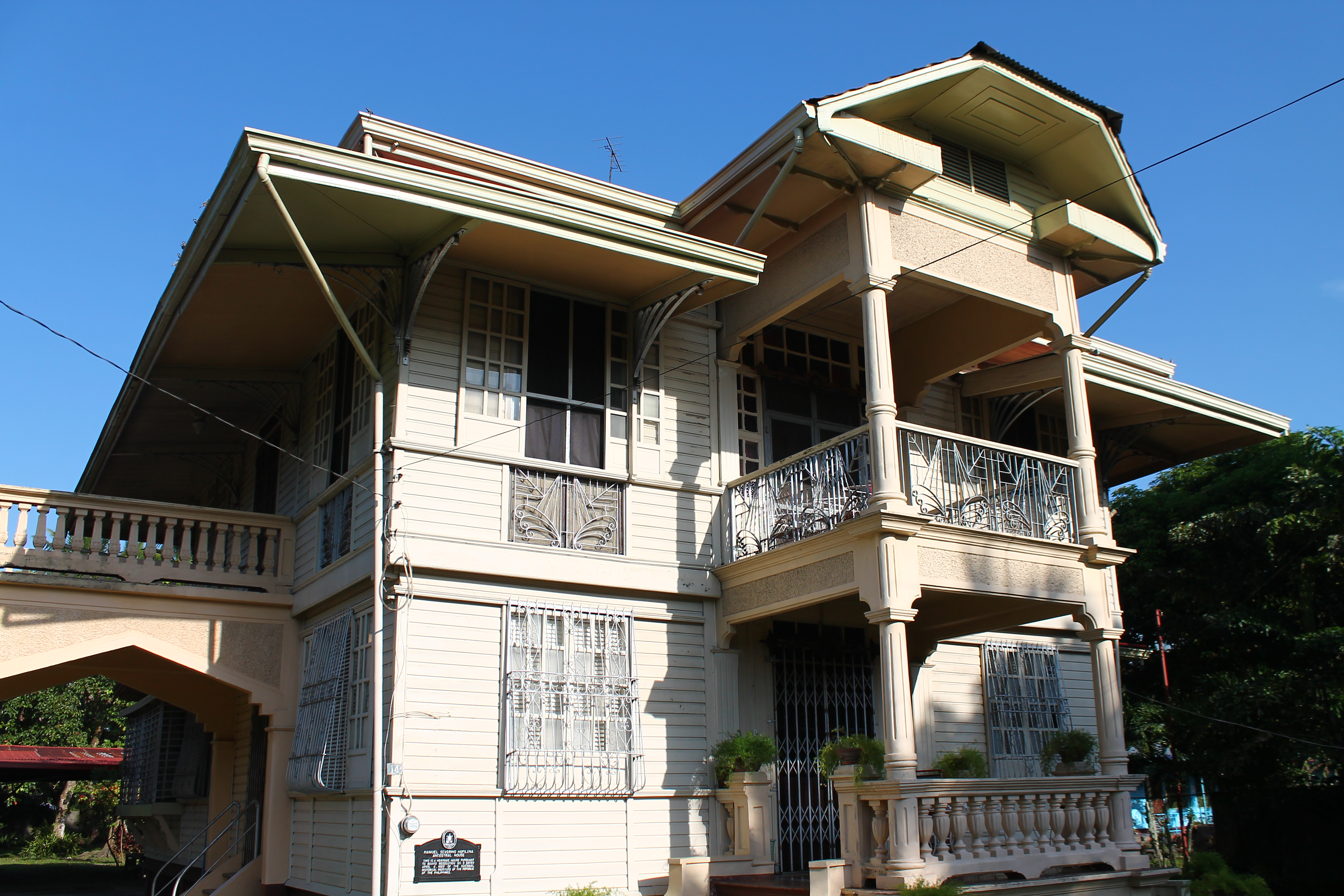
The Hofileña Ancestral House is the first museum in the city to open in public.

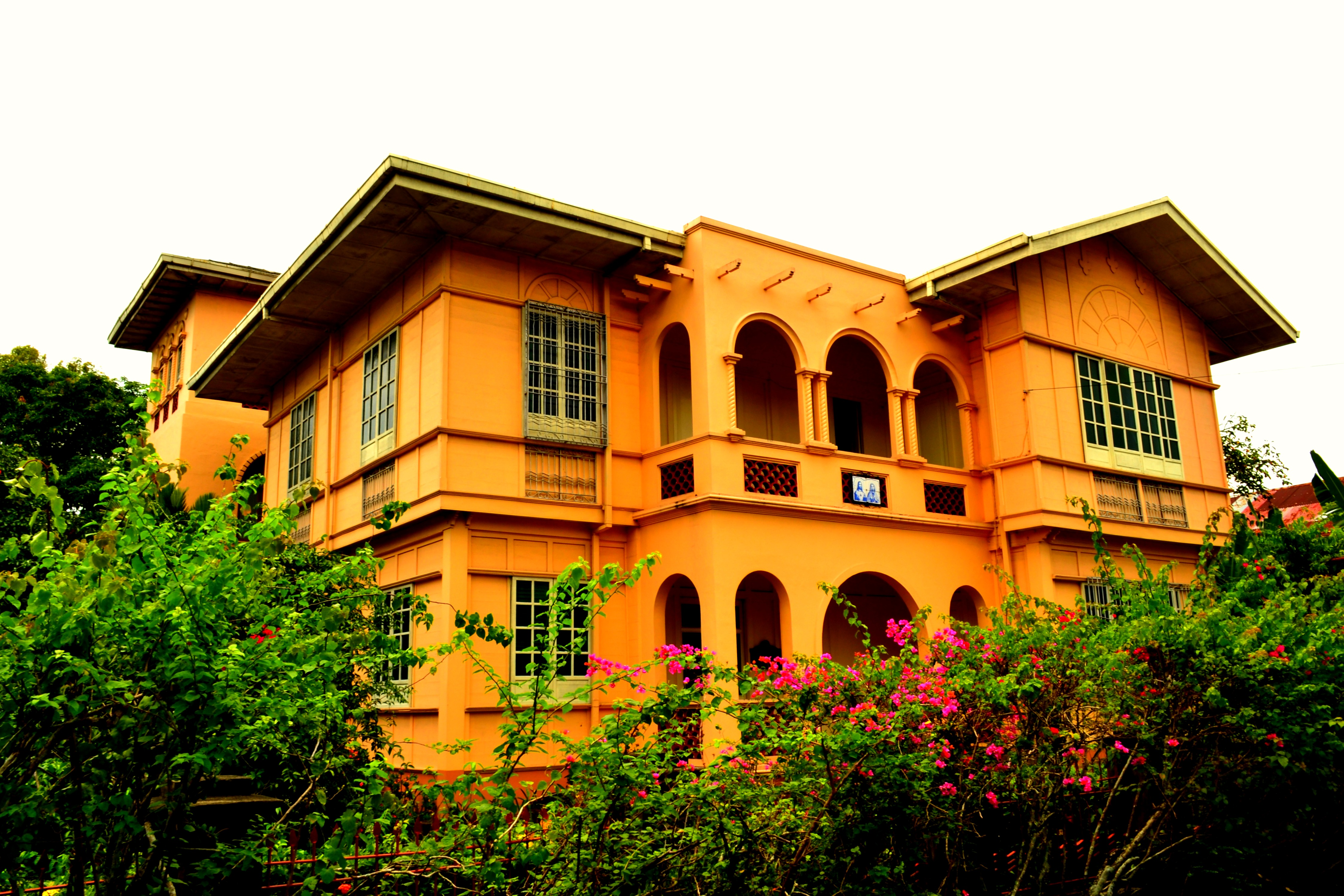
Dr. Jose Corteza Locsin Ancestral House is one of the ancestral houses in the city. It was the domicile of the late Sen. Jose C. Locsin.

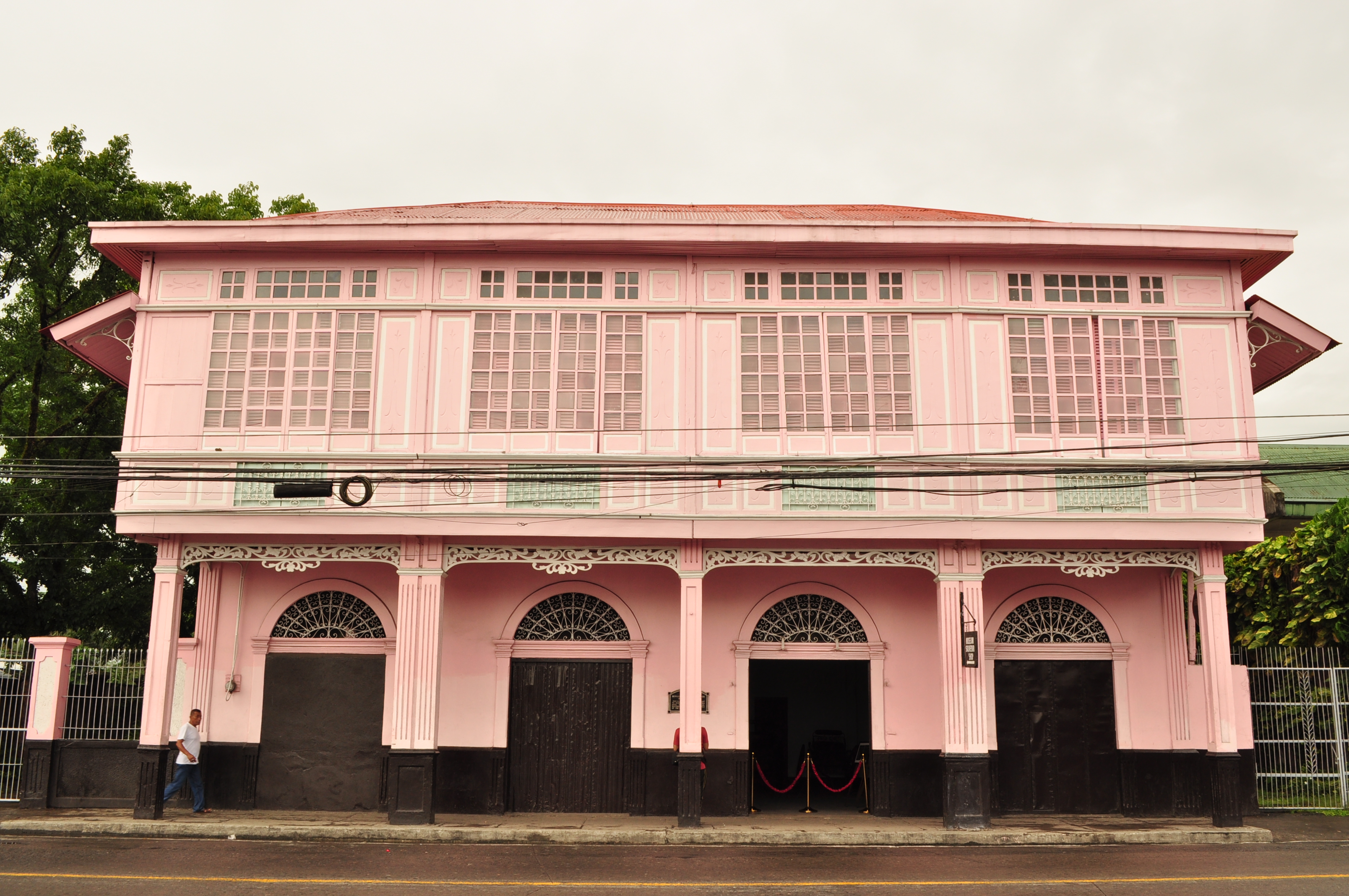
The Bernandino Jalandoni Ancestral House or also known as the "pink house, is one of the museums in the city.

A Dr. Jose Rizal statue is located at the Silay City Public Plaza.

The smallest doll in the world can be found in Hofileña Ancestral House.

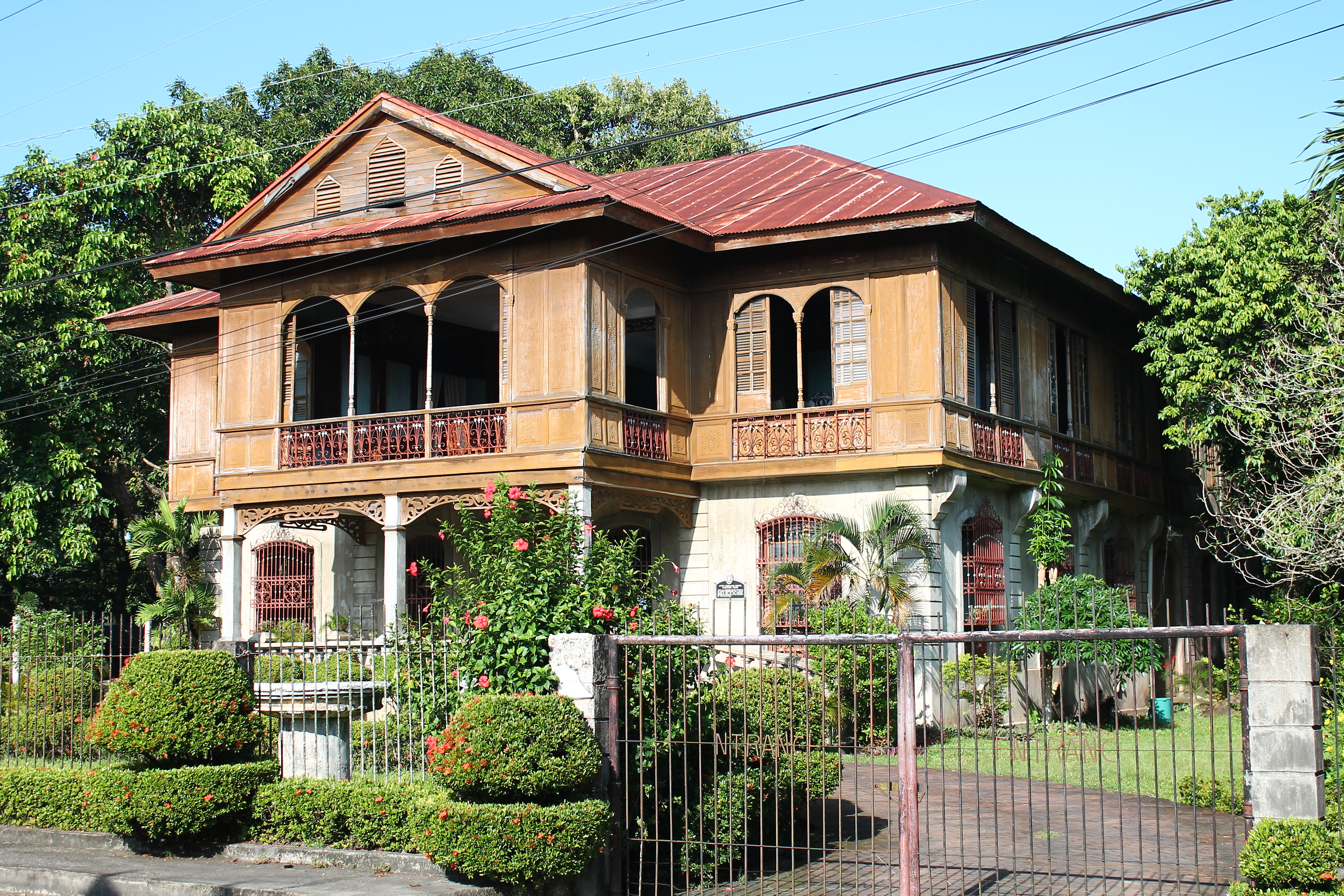
The Balay Negrense is the most visited museum in the city.

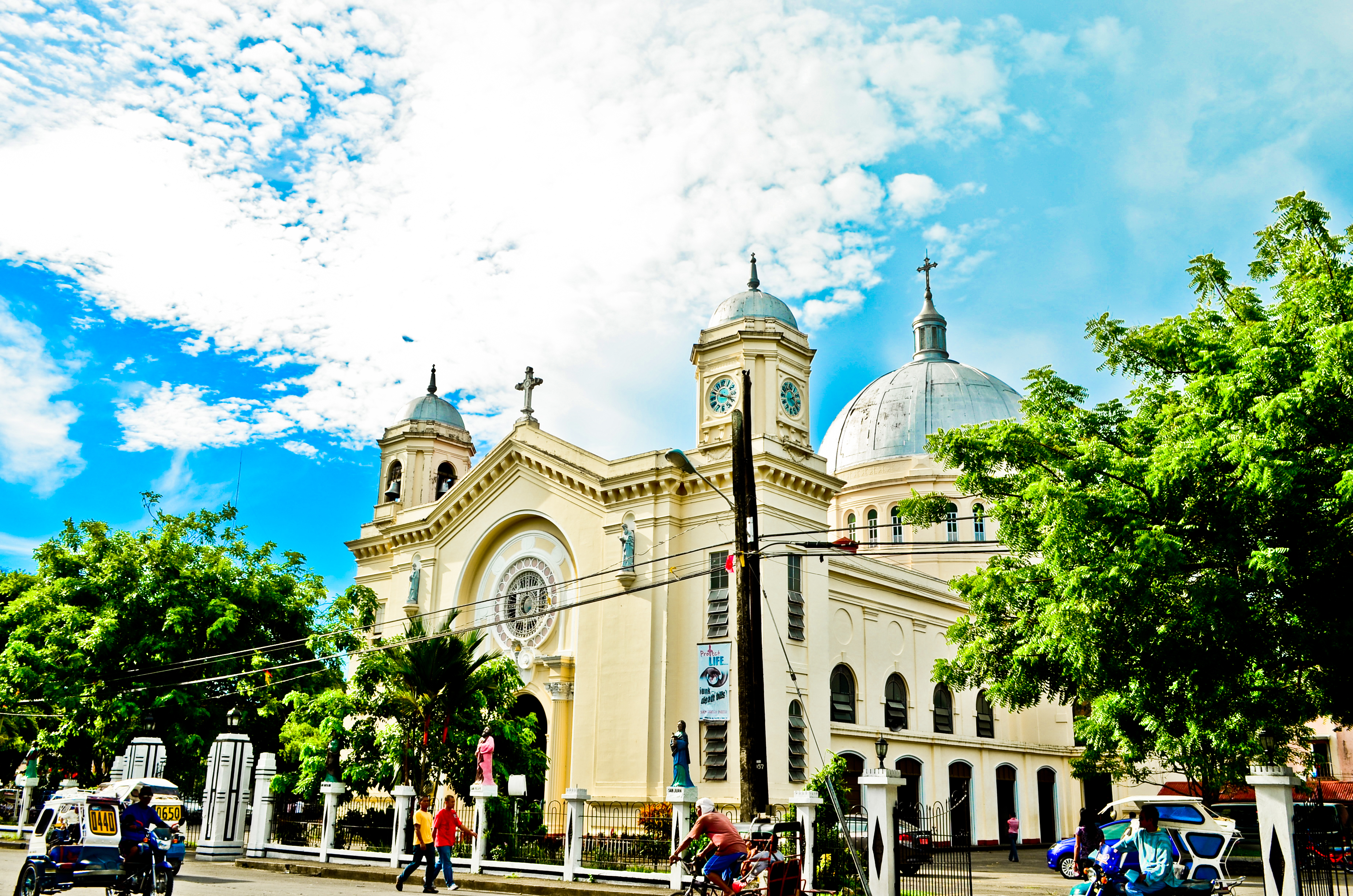
The San Diego Pro-Cathedral is the only church in the province that has a dome.

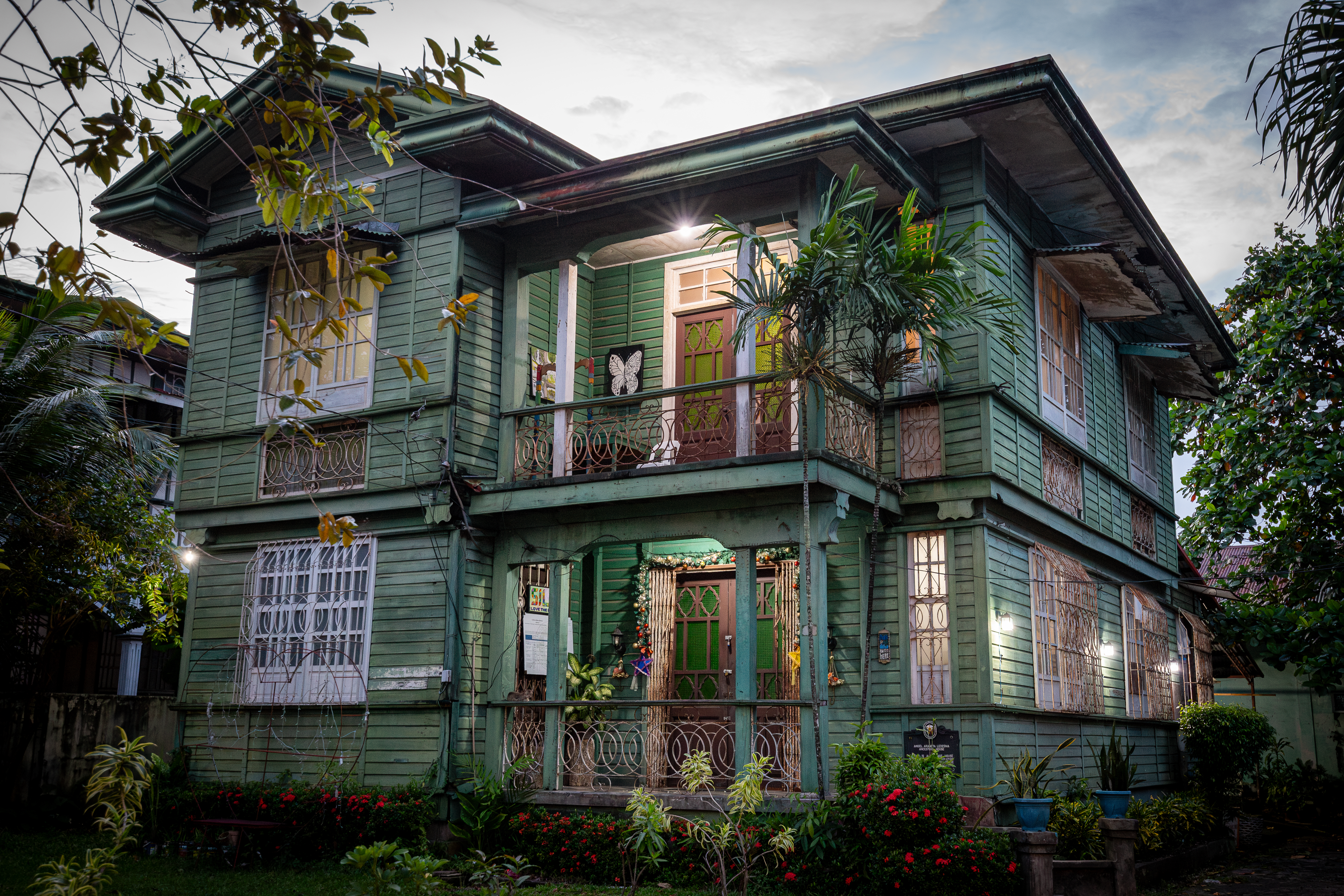
Angel Ledesma House, one of the hundred-year-old houses in Silay City

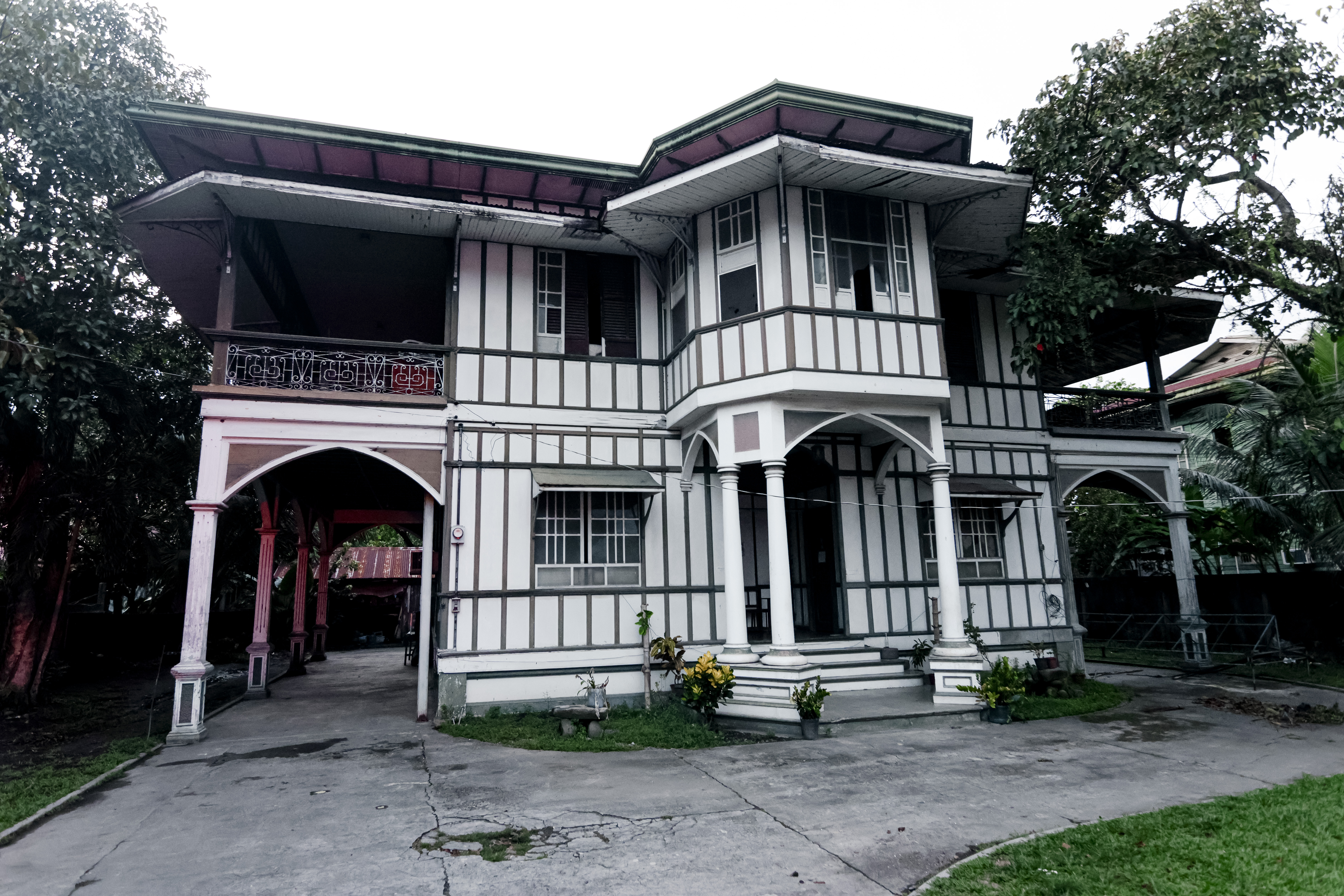
The Alejandro Amechazura Residence

== Sister cities ==
Silay City has been twinned with the following cities:

=== Local ===
- (Philippines) Mandaluyong, Metro Manila
- (Philippines) Manila, Metro Manila
- (Philippines) Santa Rosa, Laguna

=== International ===
- Amagi of Kagoshima Prefecture, Japan

== Notable people ==
=== National Artists of the Philippines ===
- Teodoro Hilado - National Artist of the Philippines for theater, Father of lighting design in Philippine theater, lighting technician, theater director
- Agnes Locsin - National Artist of the Philippines for dance, choreographer
- Leandro Locsin - National Artist of the Philippines for Architecture, Architect of the Cultural Center of the Philippines, the Philippine International Convention Center and Istana Nurul Iman the official residence of the Sultan of Brunei and the seat of power of the government of Brunei

=== Businessmen ===
- Yves Leopold Germain Gaston - Pioneer of the sugar industry in Negros Island

=== Athletes ===
- Harold Alarcon - College basketball player
- Miguel Corteza - Professional basketball player
- Alexandra Eala - Ranked World no. 20 in the Women’s Tennis Association, 2022 US Open (tennis) Junior Women’s Singles Champion
- Sonny Boy Jaro - World Boxing Council Flyweight champion
- Eric Jamili - World Boxing Council minimumweight champion
- Leo Ordiales - Volleyball player, member of the Philippines men's national volleyball team
- Sander Severino - Chess player, FIDE Master
- Young Tommy - bantamweight professional boxer
- Byron Villarias - Professional basketball player

=== Educators ===
- Juan B. Lacson - Sea Captain, Founder of John B. Lacson Foundation Maritime University

=== Entertainers ===
- Rey Abellana - Movie and television actor
- Carla Abellana - Movie and television actress
- Elvira Manahan - television host, actress and socialite
- Johnny Manahan - Film and television director, actor, talent manager, Vice President and managing director of Star Magic, Senior Vice President of ABS-CBN Corporation, Consultant for Sparkle GMA Artist Center

=== Government Officials ===
- JV Ejercito - 17th Mayor of San Juan, Metro Manila, Senator of the Philippines
- Fritz Gaston -Commissioner of the Games and Amusements Board, Commissioner of the Philippine Sports Commission
- Guia Gomez - Actress, 18th Mayor of San Juan, Metro Manila, domestic partner to Joseph Estrada the 13th President of the Philippines with whom she shares a son
- Oscar Ledesma - 16th Governor of Iloilo, Secretary of Commerce and Industry, Senator of the Philippines, Ambassador of the Philippines to the United States
- Jose Locsin - Secretary of Health and Public Welfare, Senator of the Philippines, Secretary of Agriculture and Natural Resources
- Teodoro Locsin Sr. - Journalist, Publisher of the Philippines Free Press
- Teodoro Locsin Jr. - Journalist, Press Secretary, Member of the Philippine House of Representatives, 20th Permanent Representative of the Philippines to the United Nations 27th Secretary of Foreign Affairs
- Joey Manahan - Member of the Honolulu City Council in the State of Hawaii in the United States
- Alfredo Montelibano Sr. - 1st Mayor of Bacolod, Military Governor of Negros and Siquijor Island, Secretary of National Defense and Interior

=== Socialites ===
- Rose Lacson-Porteous - Australian-Filipino socialite

=== Writers ===
- Doreen Fernandez - writer, columnist, food critic

== See also ==
- Silay (volcano)
- Tagasilay
- Metro Bacolod
