= St. Theresita's Academy =

Roman Catholic high school in Negros Occidental, Philippines

- Facade of the Administration Building

Location
- Rizal Street; Silay City, Negros Occidental; Philippines
- 10°47′40″N 122°58′27″E

Information
- Type: Private, Coeducational Catholic school
- Motto: "Work harmonized with Prayer and accomplished in Love, in imitation of the Holy Family in Nazareth"
- Established: 1932
- Director: Sr. Natividad Maravilla
- Principal: Mary Chris Joann Delara Corral
- Campus: Urban
- Color: Gray or silver
- Athletics: NOPSSCEA
- Affiliation: Roman Catholic; Siervas de San Jose
- Website: sttheresitasacademy.com/STA/MainController

St. Theresita's Academy, informally referred to by the acronym STA, is the only private, Catholic secondary school in Silay City, Negros Occidental, Philippines. Its students and alumni are called Theresians.

== History ==
The school was established in a house rented from Don Jose "Pepe" R. Ledesma in 1932 with pioneer Siervas de San Jose, sisters Mother Amancia Bautista Milagros Sarmiento, Anunciation Marco, and Olivio Moreno. It initially provided for the educational needs of kindergarten and primary pupils. The school adopted the original name of the parochial school in the city, calling itself Colegio de Sta. Teresita.

During the feast of the Immaculate Concepcion in 1949, the cornerstone of the new school building was laid in its present location at Rizal Street. Upon completion of the new building, operations commenced transfer to the new location on October 3, 1950. The school then offered services for pre-school, primary and secondary pupils.

The secondary, or high school department initially catered exclusively to female students. This was changed in 1984 when the school began accepting male students into that department, effectively becoming a co-educational institution under the guidance of Sister Anita Bago, SSJ. The pioneer batch of Theresianos graduated in 1988.

== Patron saint ==
The school's patron saint is Thérèse de Lisieux. Saint Thérèse de Lisieux (January 2, 1873 – September 30, 1897), or more properly Sainte Thérèse de l'Enfant-Jésus et de la Sainte Face ("Saint Thérèse of the Child Jesus and of the Holy Face"), born Marie-Françoise-Thérèse Martin, was a Roman Catholic nun who was canonized as a saint, and is recognized as a Doctor of the Church. She is also known by many as "The Little Flower of Jesus".

The school's student publication, the Therestic Circle, pays homage to the saint.

== See also ==
- Siervas de San Jose
- Silay Institute, Inc.
- Doña Montserrat Lopez Memorial High School
