= Silay Institute =

Private college in Negros Occidental, Philippines

- Type: Private, co-educational College
- Established: 1925
- President: Alfonso Gamboa, MBA
- Students: approximately 1200
- Location: Silay City, Negros Occidental, Philippines; 10°47′43″N 122°58′25″E
- Campus: Urban
- Colors: Grey and White
- Sporting affiliations: NOPSSCEA
- Website: www.silayinstitute.edu.ph
- Location in the Visayas Location in the Philippines

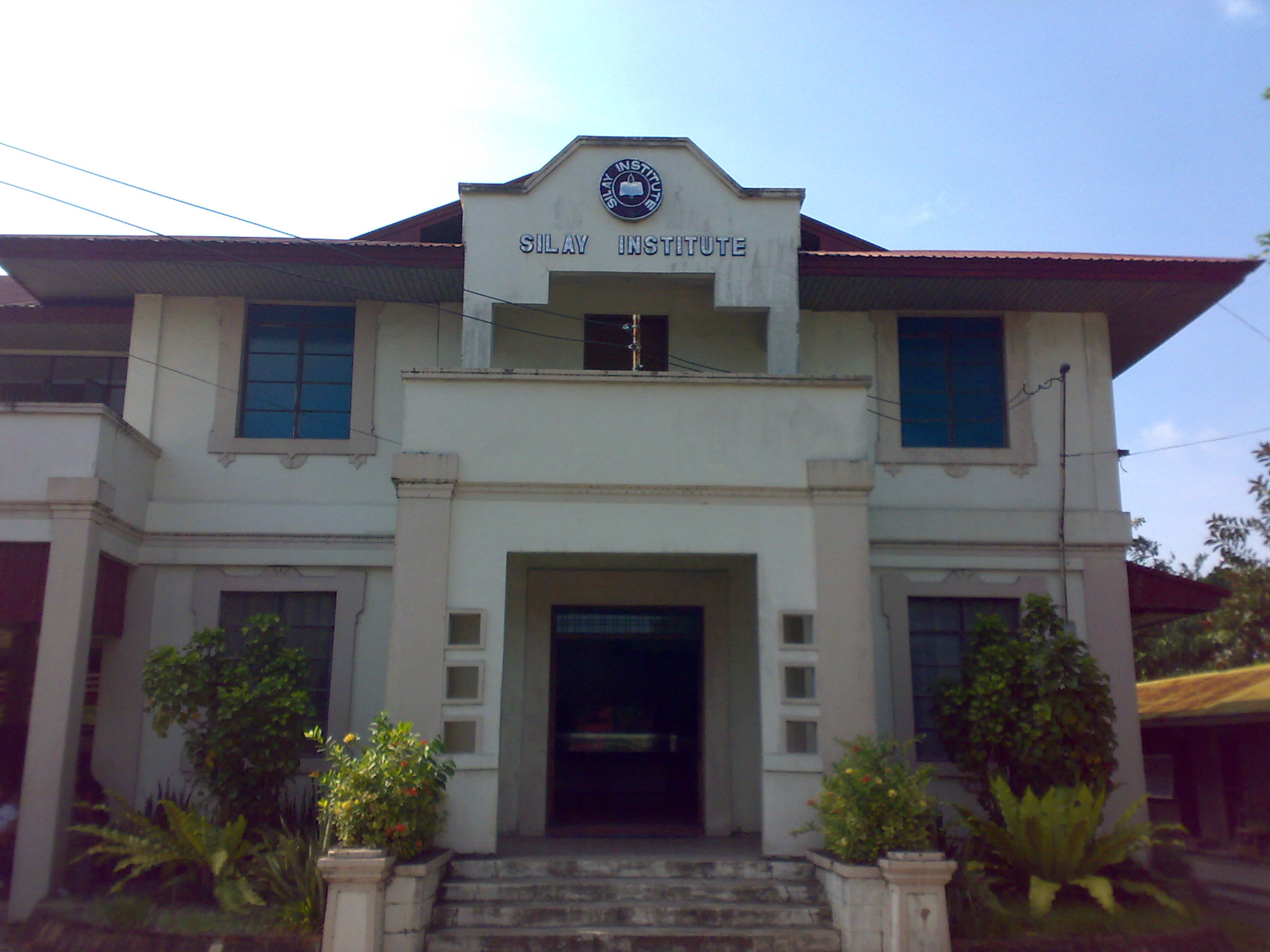
Main facade

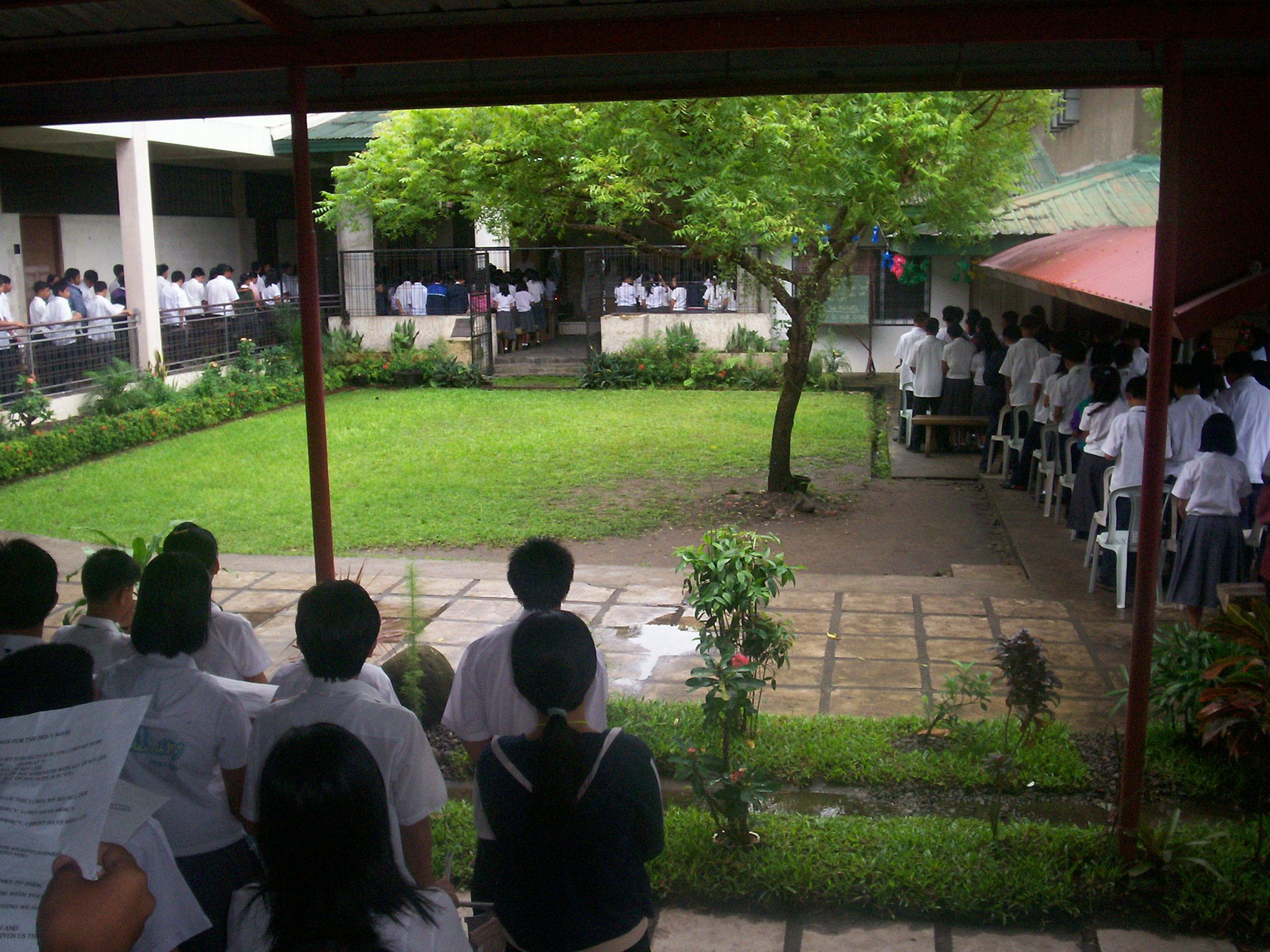
Mass in the campus

Silay Institute, informally referred to by its acronym SI, is a private, co-educational institution of learning located in Silay City, 14 kilometres (8.7 mi) north of Bacolod, the capital of Negros Occidental province in the Philippines. It is the only school in the city that offers formal college education.

== History ==
The school, originally a high school, was established in 1925 after a group of concerned citizens had a survey conducted regarding the feasibility of opening such a school to serve the children of the locality, who after graduating from primary education, had no opportunities for acquiring secondary education.

A local doctor, Dr. Luis Gamboa, initiated plans for establishing the school; he later became its first President. Another local resident, Ramon Legaspi, secured the necessary government permits, and procured instructionals for the institution.

== See also ==
- St. Theresita's Academy
- Doña Montserrat Lopez Memorial High School
