= Approbation (Catholic canon law) =

Catholic Church legal terminology

Approbation (Latin: approbātiō), in Catholic canon law, is an act by which a bishop or other legitimate superior grants to an ecclesiastic the actual exercise of his ministry.

The necessity of approbation, especially for administering the sacrament of penance, was expressly decreed by the Council of Trent so, except in the case of imminent death, the absolution by a non-approved priest would be invalid. This approbation for the sacrament of penance is the judicial declaration of the legitimate superior that a certain priest is fit to hear, and has the faculties to hear, the confession of his subjects.

By bishop is meant also his vicar general, the diocesan administrator during the vacancy of a see, or any regular prelate who has ordinary jurisdiction over a certain territory. This approbation may be given verbally or in writing, and may be given indirectly, for instance, when priests receive power to choose in their own diocese an approved priest of another diocese as their confessor. The bishop may wrongfully but validly refuse his approbation, without which no priest may hear confessions.

A confessor's jurisdiction may be restricted to various classes of persons; for example to children or to men, without the right to hear women. A special approbation is required to hear nuns or women of religious communities; this extends with modifications to all communities of recognized sisterhoods.
