= Doña Montserrat Lopez Memorial High School =

Public high school in Negros Occidental, Philippines

- DMLMHS or Montserrat

Location
- Rizal Street; Silay City, Negros Occidental; Philippines
- Coordinates: 10°48′18″N 122°58′46″E

Information
- Former name: Silay City National High School
- Type: Public school
- Established: 1968 (57–58) years
- Grades: 7 to 12
- Campus: Urban
- Colors: Green and White
- Newspaper: The Warbler (English) & Ang Pipit (Filipino)
- Website: http://dmlmhssilay.weebly.com/

Doña Montserrat Lopez Memorial High School, also referred to by the acronym DMLMHS, is a public national high school in Silay City, Negros Occidental, Philippines. It is one of the leading secondary schools in the Philippines, and one of the biggest in terms of student population The school has one extension, Doña Montserrat Lopez Memorial High School - Capitan Ramon, which it is the rural version of the school.

== History ==
The school was initially one of the political plans of Jose Maravilla, a former politician in Silay City. The plan was raised to his platforms inasmuch as the city didn't have any public high school. Unfortunately, Maravilla lost, but the plan was recognized and approved by the city council under the incumbency of then-Mayor Natalio G. Velez. The school was established on July 8, 1968 with its first principal Mr. Marcelo Jalando-on. At that time, the school was located at the backyard of the Silay South Elementary School. It was envisioned to accommodate poor but deserving elementary school graduates, and consequently offered free tuition. In 1972, Mrs. Amparo Ledesma became the principal of the school, after Jalando-on transferred to La Carlota City College as its new prexy. On July 1, 1975, the school earned its national status and was renamed as Silay City National High School. In 1979, Don Claudio Lopez donated almost 7 hectares of land along the national highway of Brgy. Rizal; the present location of the school. The school later changed its name to Doña Montserrat Lopez Memorial High School, in honor of the donor's wife.

== Present ==
=== Fire Incident ===
On November 11, 2018, a fire razed the school destroying eight classrooms. The said fire erupted at 5 p.m. and lasted 25 minutes, which the fire immediately spread to nearby classrooms. According to the Bureau of Fire Protection (BFP), the fire induced by defective electrical wiring, left approximated destruction of P500,000. No casualties were reported.

== Curriculum ==
=== Junior high school ===
- Special Program in the Arts
- Strengthening Technical Vocational Educational Program
- Information and Communication Technology
- Science Technology and Engineering

=== Senior High School ===
- Technical Vocational Livelihood
  - Shielded Metal Arc Welding (SMAW)
  - Electrical Installation and Maintenance (EIM)
  - Electronic Product Assembly and Servicing (EPAS)
  - Dressmaking
  - Cookery
  - Food and Beverages Services (FBS)
  - Bread and Pastry
  - Computer System Servicing (CSS)
- Arts and Design
- Science Technology Engineering and Mathematics

== Gallery ==

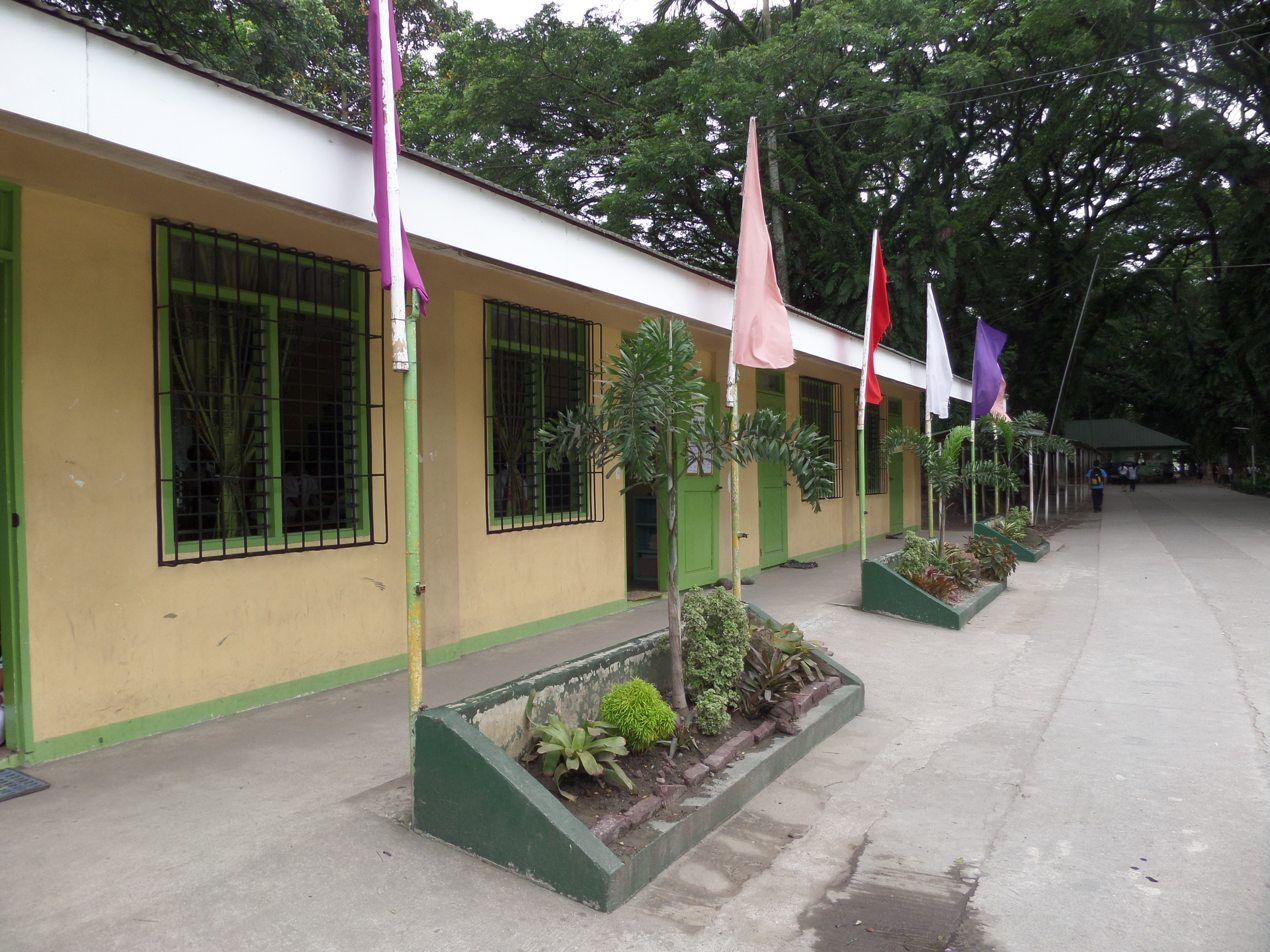

== See also ==
- Silay Institute
- St. Theresita's Academy
- Silay South Elementary School
- La Purisima Concepcion Elementary School
