= Mariano Ramos Ancestral House =

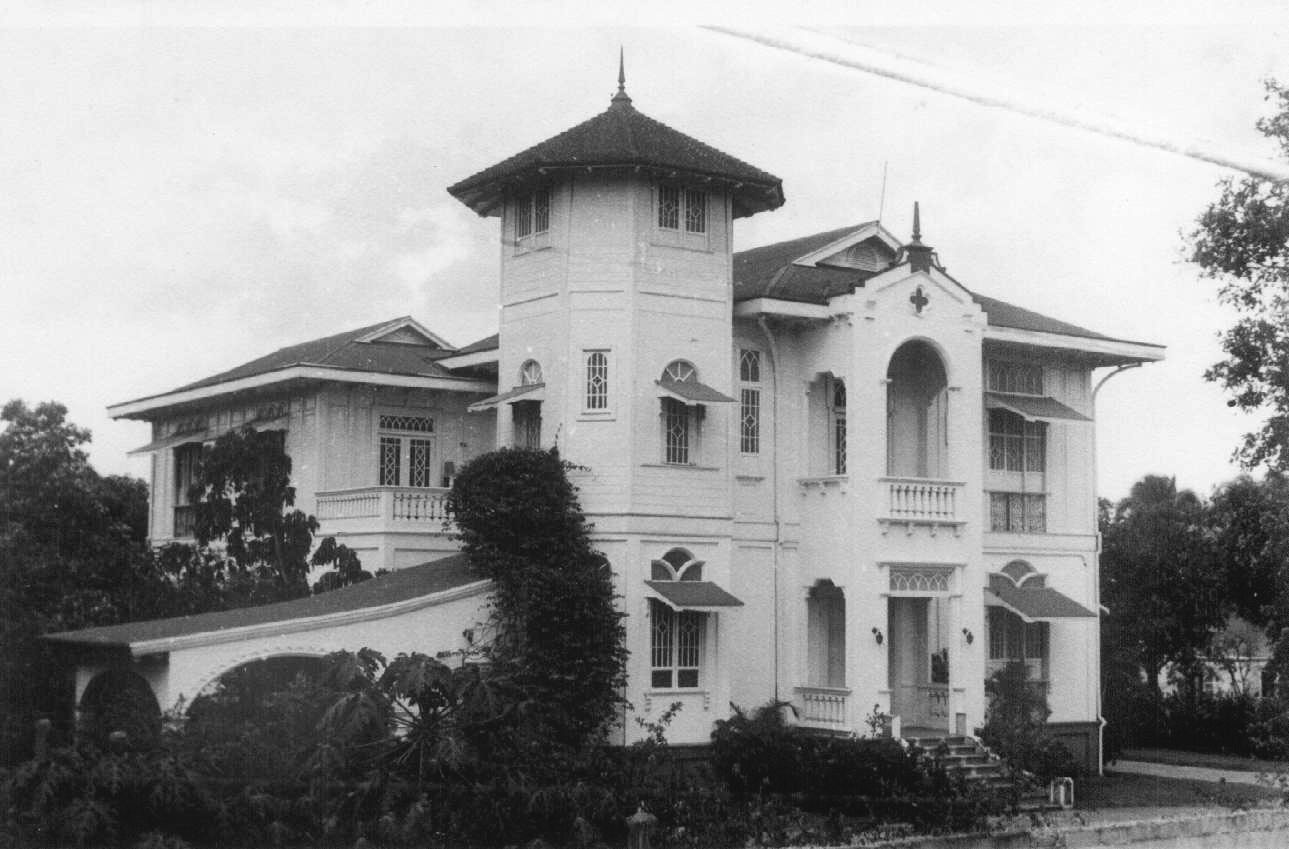
- The Mariano Ramos Ancestral House along #44 Burgos Street, Bacolod Cit
- Established: 1930
- Location: Bacolod Negros Occidental Philippines
- Coordinates: 10.6707°N 122.9520°E
- Type: ancestral house
- Owner: Mariano Ramos
- Website: Official website
- Building details

General information
- Status: Completed
- Type: House
- Architectural style: Castilian Spanish and Tuscan Order architecture
- Location: Bacolod city, Negros Occidental, Philippines
- Current tenants: Romulo V. Ramos
- Construction started: 1930

The Mariano Ramos Ancestral House is the home of the late Mariano Ramos, one of the first appointed Presidente Municipals of Bacolod, Philippines. The house was built in the 1930s with its architecture being a combination of Castilian and Tuscan styles. It comprises three storeys including the tower room, known as the torre or mirador.

During World War II, Bacolod City was occupied by the Japanese forces on May 21, 1942, under the command of Lieutenant General Takeshi Kono, the Japanese commanding officer of the 77th Infantry Brigade, 102nd Division. The House of Don Mariano Ramos, being the tallest building in the city, was seized by the Japanese, and used it as the watchtower over the city. The family of Mariano Ramos was forced to retreat to the nearby municipality of Murcia, where they spent most of their time during the war era. The city was liberated by joint Filipino and American forces on May 29, 1945. It took time to rebuild the city after liberation Don Mariano were saved from destruction by the retreating Japanese forces

== Prominence in the 1930s ==
On a short stretch of Burgos Street, once known as "Millionaires' Row", still stands several grand houses belonging to some of the richest and landed families of Bacolod City. The Ramos house, considered one of the most prominent of these houses, is the house built by the Ramos family patriarch Don Mariano Ramos, the first Municipal President or Mayor of Bacolod City.

In 1935, he commissioned a certain Architect Mendoza of Manila to design and build a house for him in the Castilian and Tuscan style.

The most prominent feature of the house is the three-storey octagonal tower that gave the owners a panoramic view of the city and the surrounding landscape. At the rear portion of the house is a rounded balcony adjacent to the master bedroom.

Don Mariano Ramos loved to entertain. Many elegant parties were held here attended by the crème de la crème (English: best of the best) of Bacolod society and visited by both local and national government officials. One such guest was Mariano's close friend and classmate, Philippine President Manuel L. Quezon.

Legendary in those days were his twenty or more cars of different makes chauffeured by Spanish mestizo and Filipino drivers.

== Present day ==
Today, the house of Don Mariano Ramos is cherished by the descendants of his eldest son, the late Dr. Romulo V. Ramos.

== See also ==
- Balay Negrense
- The Ruins (mansion)
- Hacienda Rosalia
- Silliman Hall (Anthropology museum)
- Dizon-Ramos Museum
- Museo negrense de la salle
