= Cesar Lacson Locsin Ancestral House =

Declared Heritage House in Silay, Negros Occidental, Philippines

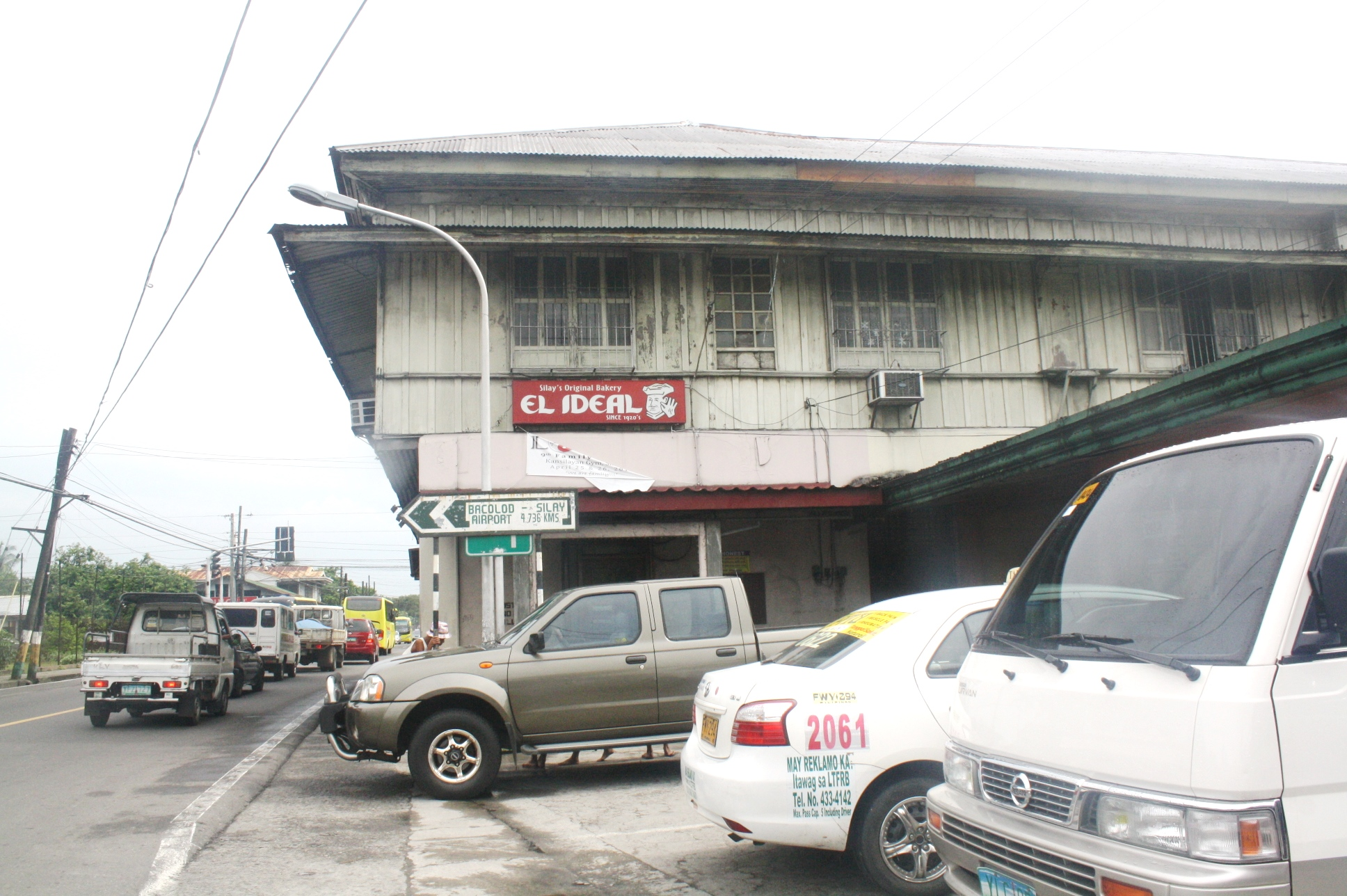
- The Cesar Lacson Locsin Ancestral House is home of El Ideal Bakery.

- Location within Philippines
- Alternative names: El Ideal Bakery

General information
- Status: Completed
- Architectural style: Bahay na bato
- Location: Rizal and Fr. Eusebio Streets, Silay City, Negros Occidental, Philippines
- Coordinates: 10°47′54″N 122°58′31″E
- Owner: Mr. and Mrs. Henry and Maritess Villanueva-Sanchez and family

Technical details
- Floor count: two

The Cesar Lacson Locsin Ancestral House is a heritage house known to be the home of El Ideal Bakery, the oldest bakery along Rizal and Eusebio Streets in Silay, Negros Occidental. The bakery is known for its guapple pie (a combination of guava and apple pie) and several other local delicacies and sweets.

== History ==
Around the 1920s, Cesar Lacson Locsin and his sisters, Julianita "Nitang" Locsin-Gamboa included, started baking breads and cookies in their lone brick oven within the confines of their two-storey home.

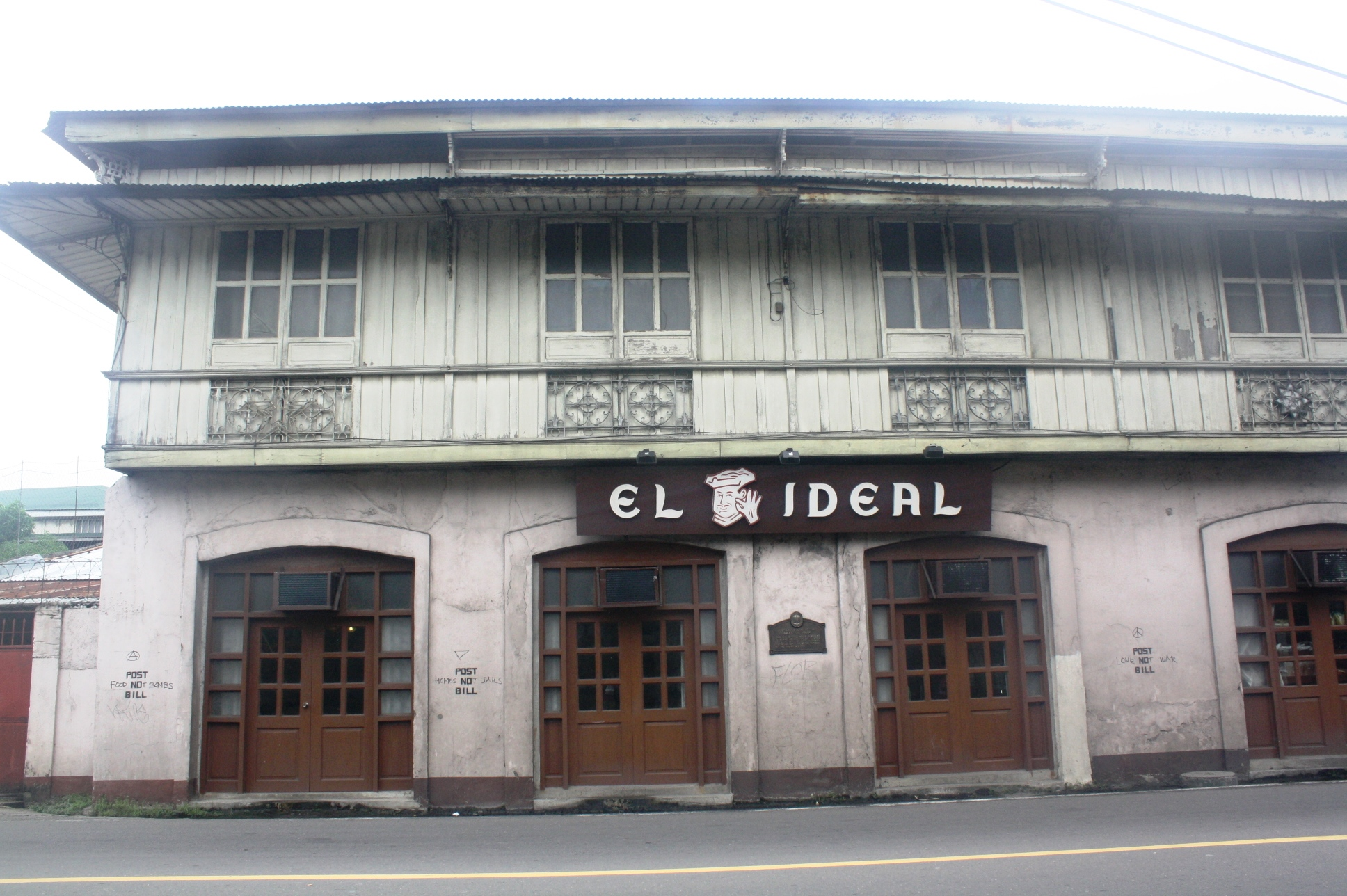
El Ideal Bakery from the highway.

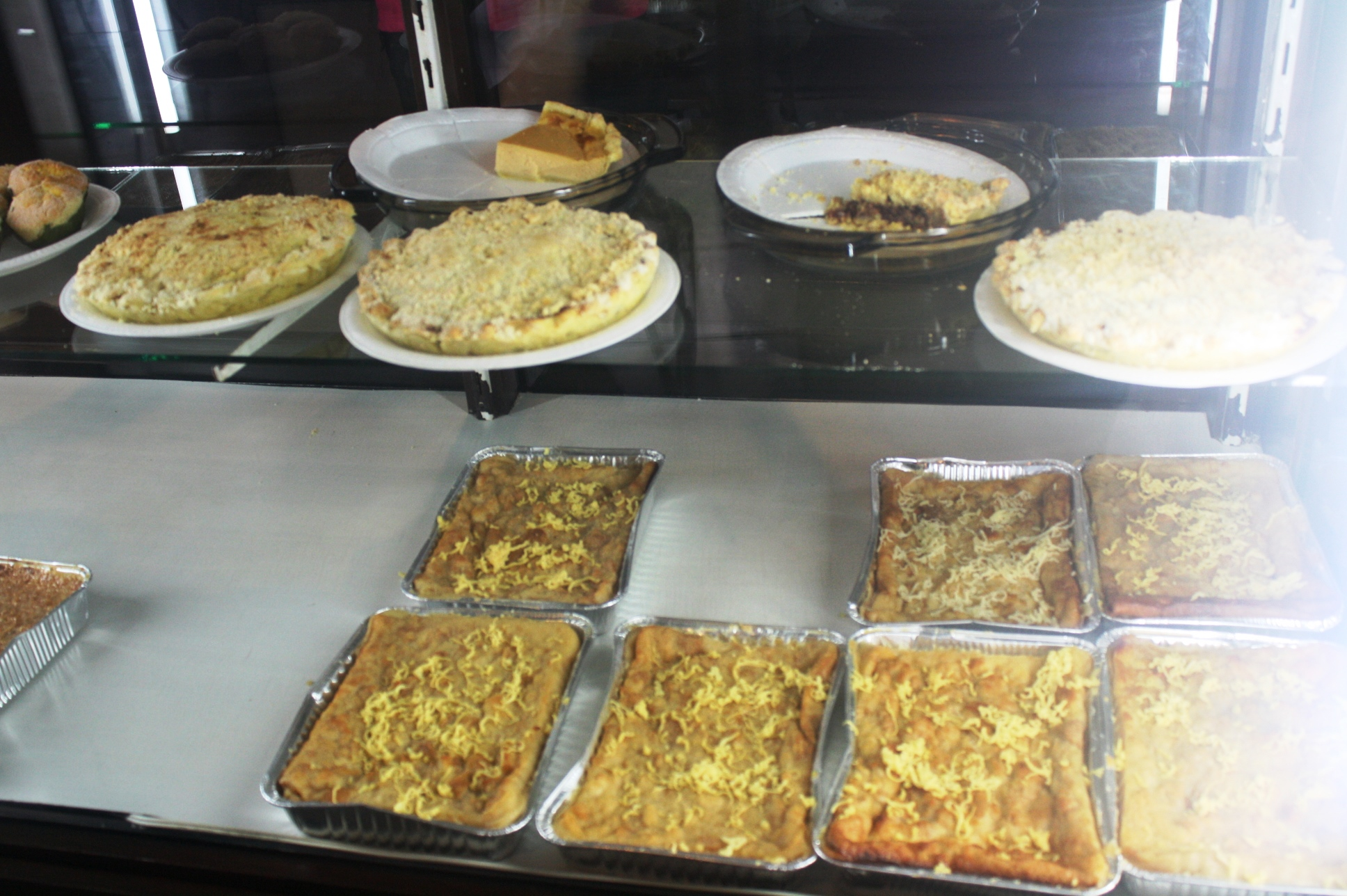
The famous pies of El Ideal.

During the glory days of Silay, El Ideal served to cater to the gastronomic needs of gamblers who were often glued to their favorite pastime.

Then time came when the sisters had to leave the bakeshop to the hands of Locsin as the sole owner. Locsin-Gamboa, on her part, had to focus on raising a family and had to sell her share to her brother. Locsin took on the responsibility of running El Ideal and eventually passed the management to his daughter, Alice Locsin-Villanueva, in the 1950s. Locsin-Villanueva developed El Ideal by installing another brick oven, adding a restaurant that occupied the whole ground floor of the ancestral house, and expanding its product line that included refreshments. Now, Locsin's granddaughter Maritess Villanueva-Sanchez with her husband Henry Sanchez and son Mark took over the business.

But El Ideal was not without challenges. In 1977, there was a move to widen Rizal St., which would mean taking down heritage structures, such as the Cesar Lacson Locsin Ancestral House. But the residents of Silay expressed their desire to protect these old buildings. A petition was submitted and the plan never pushed through. Such demolition would have chopped off a portion of the refreshment parlor and part of the kitchen.

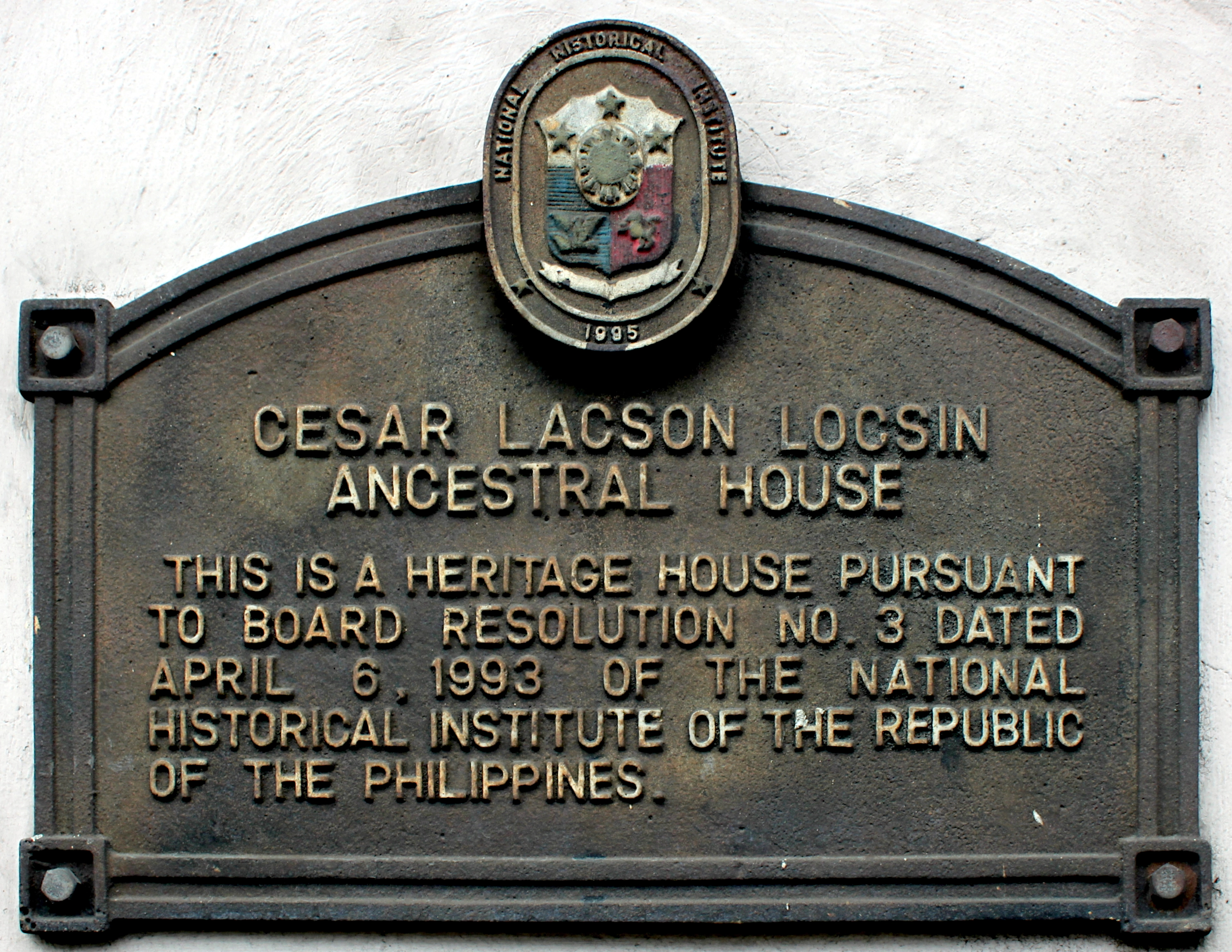
Historical marker stating that the building is a Heritage House as of 1993

The Cesar Lacson Locsin Ancestral House is now protected from such threats through its stature as a heritage structure through a declaration by the National Historical Institute pursuant to board resolution no. 3 dated 6 April 1993.

== Art and architecture ==
An Antillan structure, the Cesar Lacson Locsin Ancestral House adheres to the classic "bahay na bato" standards wherein the lower portion is made of concrete while the upper floor is made of wood. The windows are made of glass panes and the upper-level windows have iron grills.

== See also ==
- The Lacson Ruins
- Lizares Mansion
- Dr. Jose Corteza Locsin Ancestral House
- Hacienda Rosalia
- Ancestral Houses of the Philippines
