= Yves Leopold Germain Gaston =

Filipino patriarch

Yves Leopold Germain Gaston was the patriarch of a large family with roots in the City of Silay, in the province of Negros Occidental, Philippines.

== Origin in France ==
The real and legal surname of Yves Leopold was in fact Germain. He was born in Lisieux, France, the twenty third of the month of Brumaire, Year twelve of the French Republic at six o’clock evening. (November 15 1803 in Gregorian calendar). Son of Pierre Germain, National Gendarme professional, and Marie Anne Logre married. Later on, he adopted the very French-sounding name of Gaston, certainly because for a Frenchman, the surname Germain created too many problems and confusion. The Name Gaston was retained by the following generations as their surname.

== Settlement in Philippines ==
He settled in the Philippines, where he is credited as the first to commercially produce cane sugar, the primary product of the province.

Gaston first moved to Calatagan, Batangas in 1837 to help Domingo Róxas, a prominent businessman and ancestor of the Zóbel de Ayala family, set up his sugar business. It was there that Gaston met Prudencia Fernandez, who later became his wife. When his partner's business did not prosper, the Frenchman decided to try his prospects first in Iloilo and from there, he ventured to Negros. He arrived at the port city of Silay in 1840, where he found the soil conducive to planting sugarcane. He brought in an iron mill or "horno economico", which at that time was virtually unheard of.

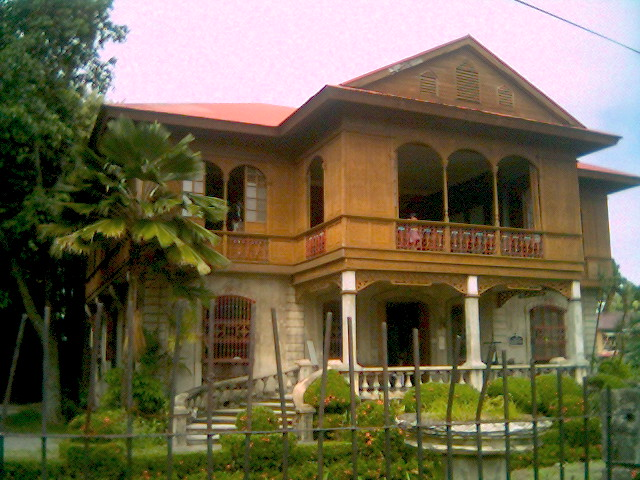
Balay Negrense on Cinco de Noviembre Street, Silay City, Negros Occidental, Philippines

The iron mill allowed him to begin commercial production of export-quality sugar. The Spaniards endorsed his residence in the Philippines due to the impact of his technology on the economy. He had become a sugar baron and was exporting the product alongside Nicholas Loney, the first British vice-consul in the country who, because of his efforts to promote sugar, became known as the "Father of the Sugar Industry." Gaston later decided to bring his family to back to France. However, on the way, he fell ill and eventually died. His wife and three children, not knowing a word of French, returned to Silay and permanently settled there, continuing the family business. The sugar industry soon peaked, and sugarcane became the staple crop throughout Negros Occidental.

== House of Gaston ==
The house of Gaston's eldest son is now a museum open to the public and is fondly called the Balay Negrense (Hiligaynon, "The Negrense House").

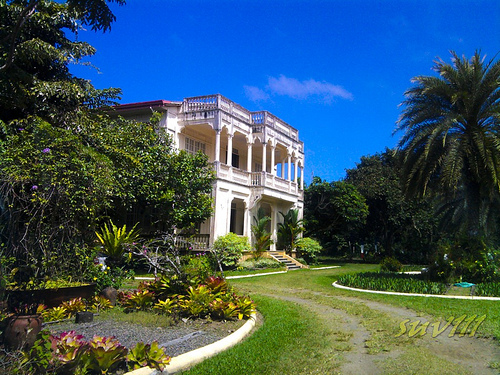
Hacienda Rosalia, setting for the 1982 film Oro, Plata, Mata.

José Gaston, grandson of Yves Leopold Germain Gaston, built another house called the Hacienda Rosalia in Manapla, Negros Occidental, also open to the public.

== Notable Descendants ==
- Antonio C. Gaston - Mayor of Silay
- Conchita Gaston - International Mezzo Soprano and Opera singer
- Dwight Gaston - Actor, Writer, Costume designer, member of the Art department for the 1986 Hollywood fim Platoon, by Oliver Stone, notable for playing Kuya Dwight in the long running children’s television show Batibot
- Emilio Gaston - 14th Governor of Negros Occidental
- Fritz Gaston - Commissioner of the Philippine Sports Commission, basketball player and coach
- Gregory Ramon Gaston - Catholic Priest, Rector of the Pontificio Collegio Filippino in Rome
- Guillermo Gaston - Catholic Priest and Monsignor,last filipino to reside at the Pontifical Collegio Latino Americano in Rome
- Jose Gaston - Original owner of Hacienda Rosalia , the setting for several films and television series which includes Peque Gallaga’s Oro Plata Mata and the Philippine remake of It’s Okay to Not Be Okay starring Anne Curtis and Joshua Garcia
- Lydia Gaston - Broadway and Hollywood actress, known for starring as Susan Valencia in the 2022 film Easter Sunday
- Victor F. Gaston - Original owner of Balay Negrense

== See also ==
- Silay City
- Negros Occidental
