= Dizon-Ramos Museum =

Historic house museum in Bacolod, Philippines

- Established: 1950
- Location: Bacolod, Negros Occidental, Philippines
- Coordinates: 10°40′15″N 122°57′07″E
- Type: Local museum, ancestral house
- Owners: Raymundo L. Dizon and Hermelinda V. Ramos
- Website: www.facebook.com/dizonramosmuseum/
- Building details
- Location in the Visayas Location in the Philippines

General information
- Status: Completed
- Type: House
- Architectural style: Modern and neoclassical
- Location: Bacolod city, Negros Occidental, Philippines
- Current tenants: J.R.R. Dizon Foundation, Rolando R. Dizon-Chair, Ed Pestano-President
- Construction started: 1950

The Dizon-Ramos Museum is situated in Bacolod, Negros Occidental, Philippines beside the Mariano Ramos Ancestral House.

== History ==
The house was built in 1950s. It was converted to a museum in 2007. It is located in Burgos Ave, Bacolod, Negros Occidental.

== Mariano Ramos Ancestral House ==
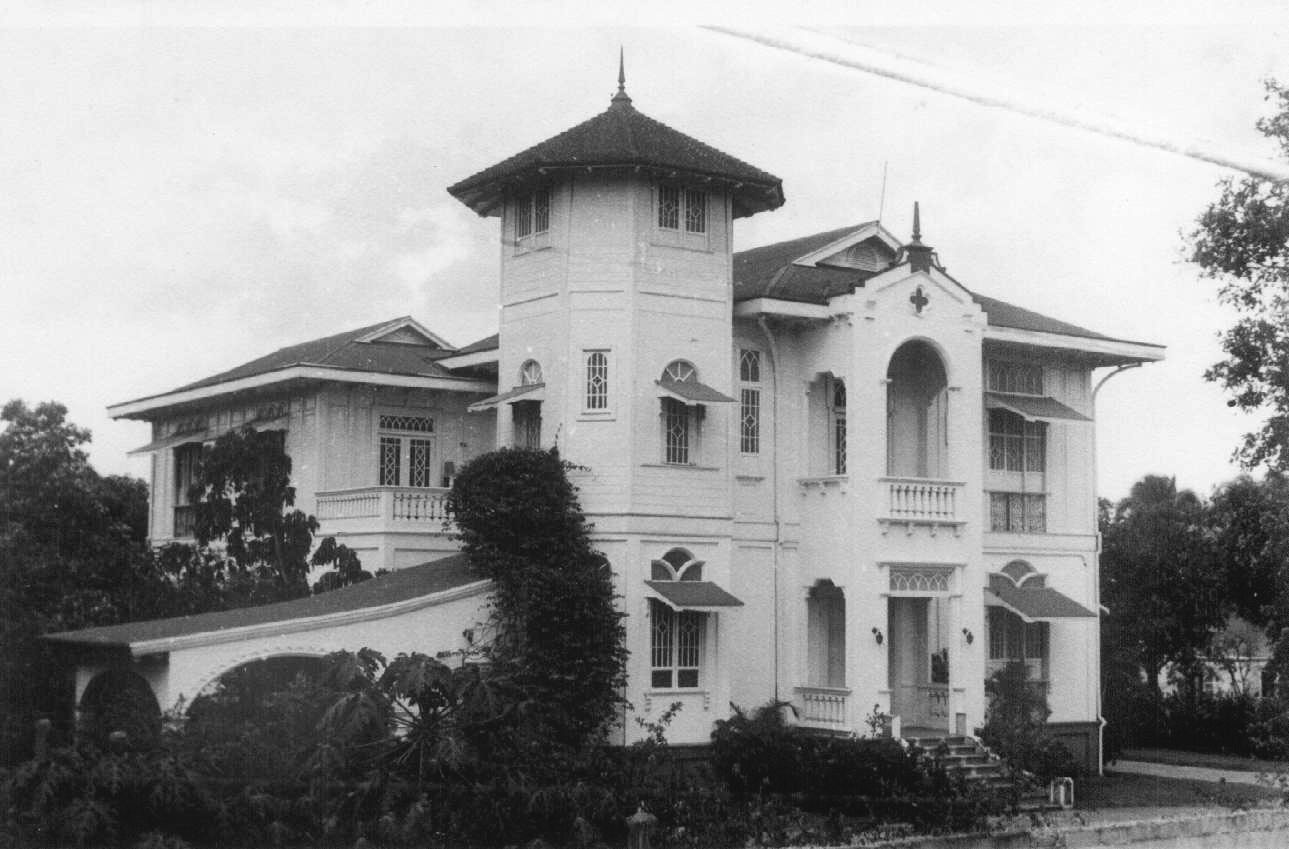
The Mariano Ramos Ancestral House along #44 Burgos Street, Bacolod City

The Mariano Ramos Ancestral House is the home of the late Mariano Ramos, first appointed Presidente Municipal of Bacolod City, Philippines. It was built in the 1930s and its architecture is a combination of Castilian and Tuscan and comprises three storeys including the tower room, known as the torre. It is beside the Dizon-ramos museum.

== Collections ==
The collections are the old photographs, naff ceramics, glassware, jewelry, crystals, porcelain paintings and religious knick-knacks.

== See also ==
- Balay Negrense
- The Ruins (mansion)
- Hacienda Rosalia
- Silliman Hall
- Museo Negrense de La Salle
- Dr. Jose Corteza Locsin Ancestral House
