= Dr. Jose Corteza Locsin Ancestral House =

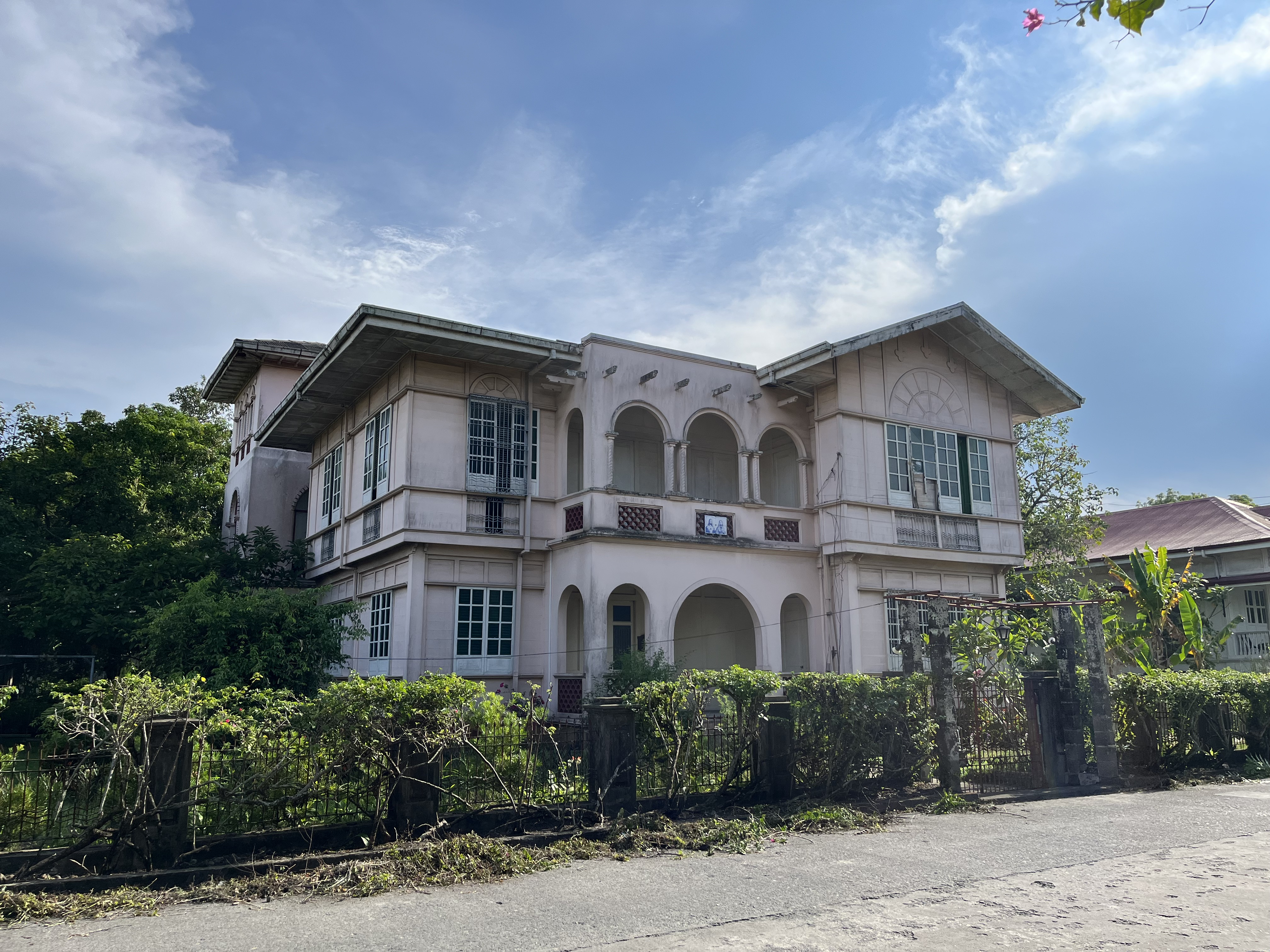
- Facade
- Type: Historic house museum
- Building details

General information
- Status: Completed
- Type: Residential
- Architectural style: Art Deco
- Location: Silay, Negros Occidental, Philippines
- Coordinates: 10.798227°N 122.974091°E
- Construction started: 1930s
- Owner: Locsin family

Dr. Jose Corteza Locsin Ancestral House is a two-storey house built in the 1930s in Silay, Negros Occidental Philippines. It has been named as a Heritage Houses of the Philippines by the National Historical Commission of the Philippines. It was the home of Jose Locsin (1891–1977), a Filipino medical doctor and senator.

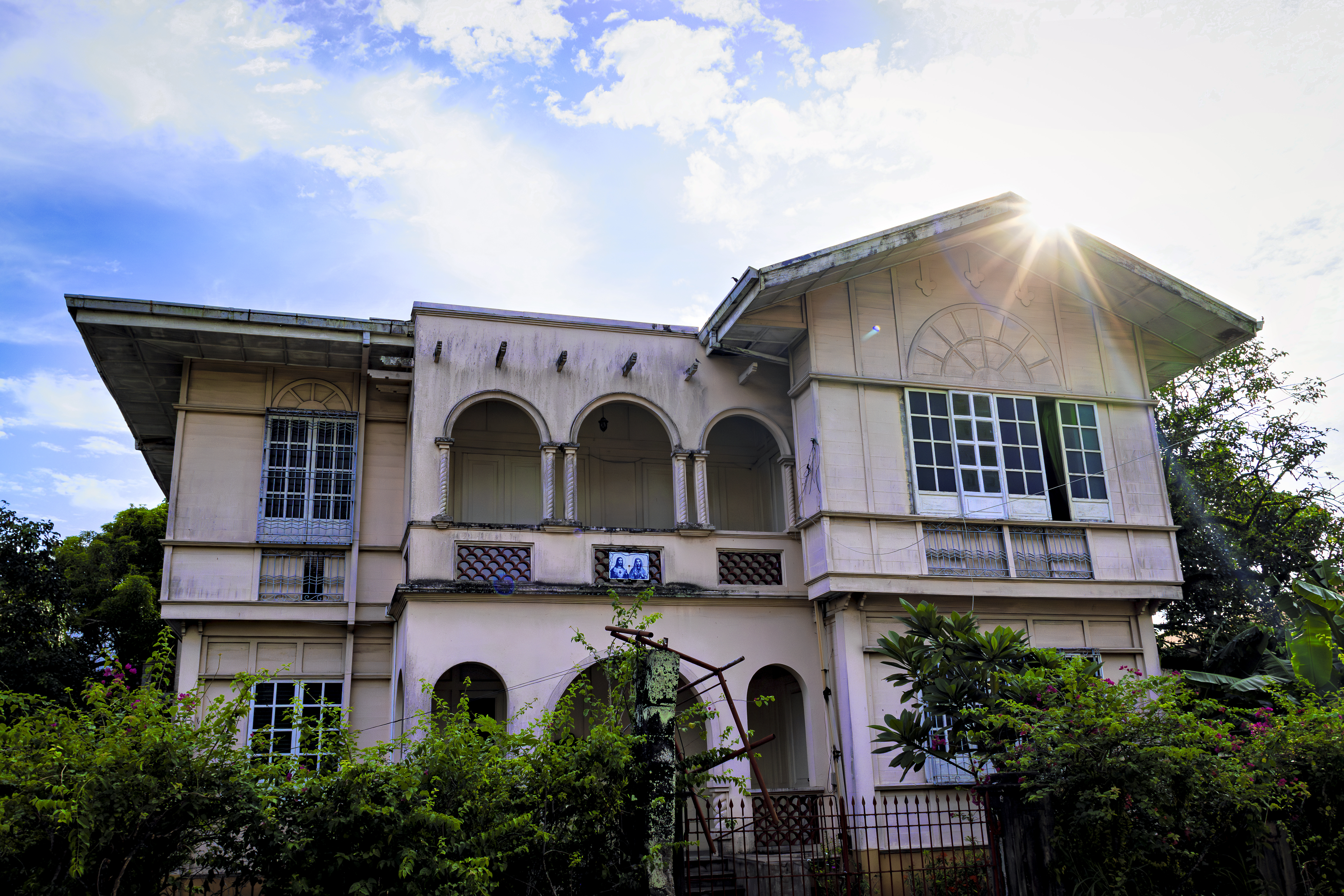
A 2024 image of the Dr. Jose Corteza Locsin Ancestral House

== See also ==
- Dizon-Ramos Museum
- Hacienda Rosalia
- Museo Negrense de La Salle
- Silliman Hall
- The Ruins (mansion)
