= Balay Negrense =

Balay Negrense Victor Gaston Ancestral House
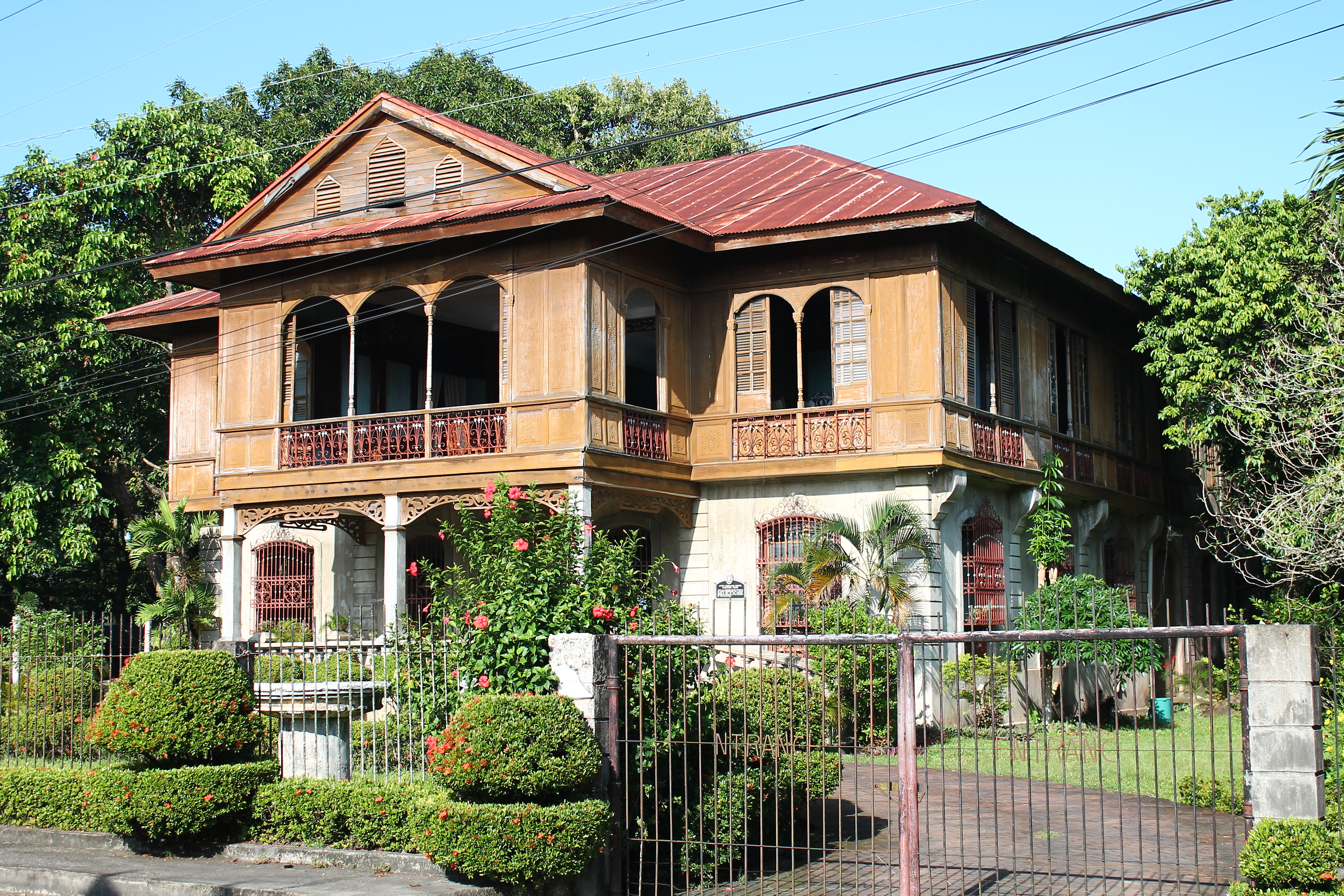
- Established: October 6, 1990
- Location: Cinco de Noviembre Street, Silay City, Negros Occidental, Philippines
- Coordinates: 10°48′00″N 122°58′23″E
- Type: lifestyle museum
- Director: Betsy Gazo
- Curators: Myrna V. Dequiña, Edsie Sazon-Valladarez
- Public transit access: pedicab, tricycle from any point in the city
- Website: www.balaynegrense.com

The Balay Negrense (Hiligaynon for Negrense House), also known as Victor Fernandez Gaston Ancestral House, is a museum in Silay City, Negros Occidental in the Philippines, showcasing the lifestyle of a late 19th-century Negrense sugar baron. It is notable for being the first museum to be established in the province of Negros Occidental.

== History ==
The Balay Negrense was originally the ancestral house of Victor F. Gaston, a son of Yves Leopold Germain Gaston and Prudencia Fernandez. The elder Gaston is credited as one of the pioneers of sugarcane cultivation in this portion of the Philippine archipelago. A native of Normandy in France, he married a Filipina from Batangas where he initially began experimenting with sugar production before relocating to Negros.

Built around 1900, the house was constructed when Victor Gaston's wife died and during the time when he was residing in his father's hacienda, Hacienda Buen Retiro. The structure housed Victor Gaston and his twelve children from 1901 until his death in 1927. Left unused by the family, the structure was abandoned in the mid-1970s and fell into disrepair until one of the heirs, Msgr. Guillermo Ma. Gaston, together with a group of concerned Negrenses formed what would later become the Negros Cultural Foundation. In 1992, Msgr. Guillermo Ma. Gaston donated the Victor Gaston house to the Philippine Tourism Authority (now known as the Tourism Infrastructure and Enterprise Zone Authority). With donations from prominent individuals and a PhP5,000,000.00 assistance from the Philippine Tourism Authority, the structure was repaired and furnished with period furniture and fixtures. The museum was officially inaugurated on October 6, 1990. Pursuant to Board Resolution No. 1 dated March 8, 1994, of the National Historical Institute of the Philippines (National Historical Commission of the Philippines), it was listed as a heritage house. In 2023 the museum was closed temporarily, as the house needed major restoration and was returned to members of the Gaston family.

== Architecture ==
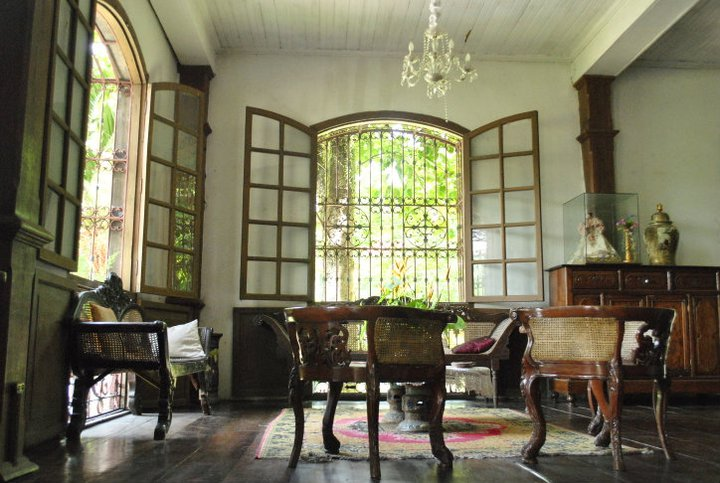
Interior living space

The house is of the type called Bahay na bato, literally "house of stone", however, reflecting American colonial influences, the lower storey is not constructed of stone but of concrete. The foundation posts are made out of trunks of the balayong tree, a local hardwood; the floorboards are of the same material. The house's upper storey is constructed of wood topped with a roof of galvanized iron instead of tile (reflecting the late-19th century trend started in Manila owing to a rule discouraging the use of tiles in favor of then-novel hiero as roofing material in the aftermath of the 1880 Luzon earthquakes).

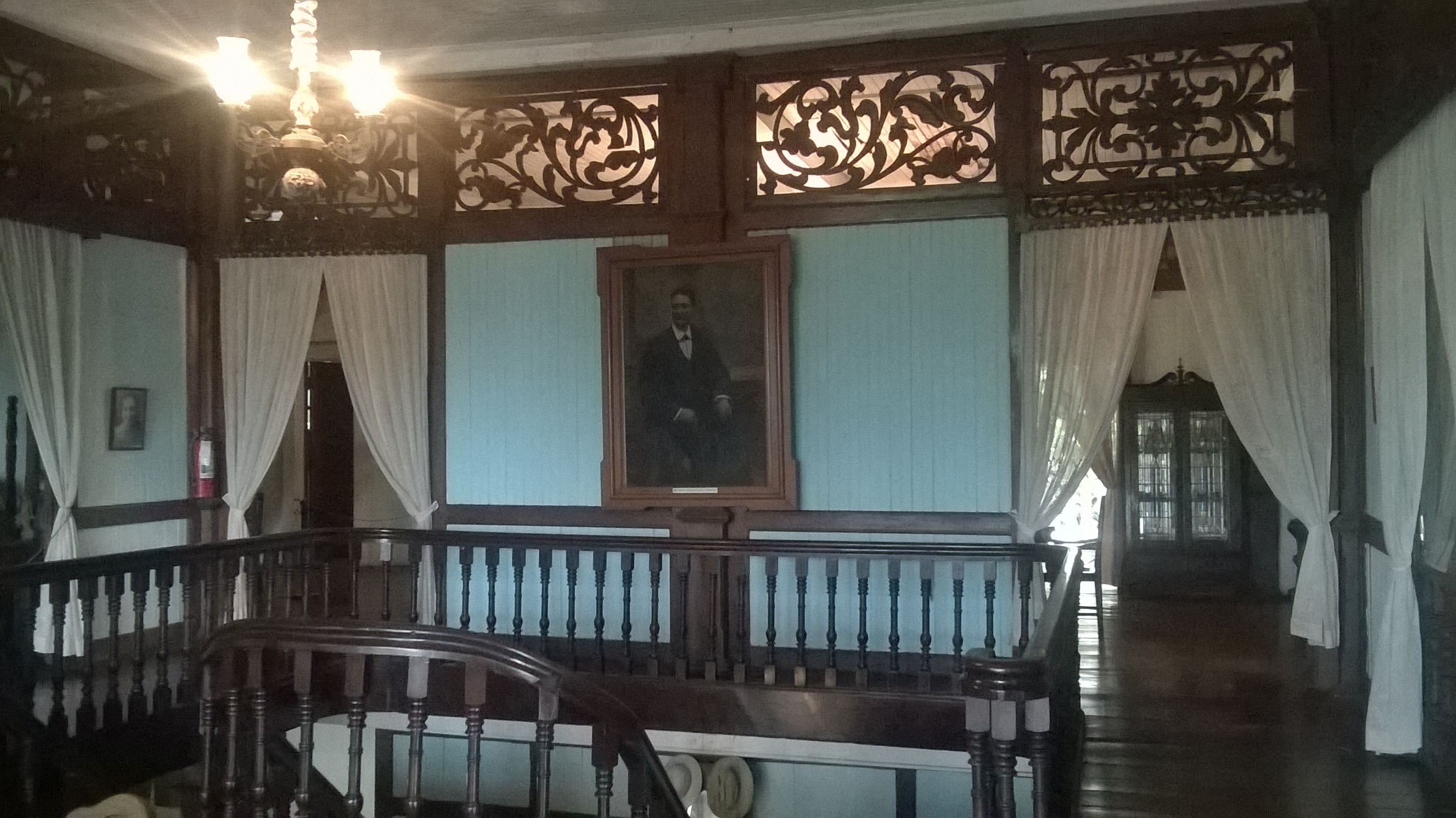
Second Floor of Balay Negrense

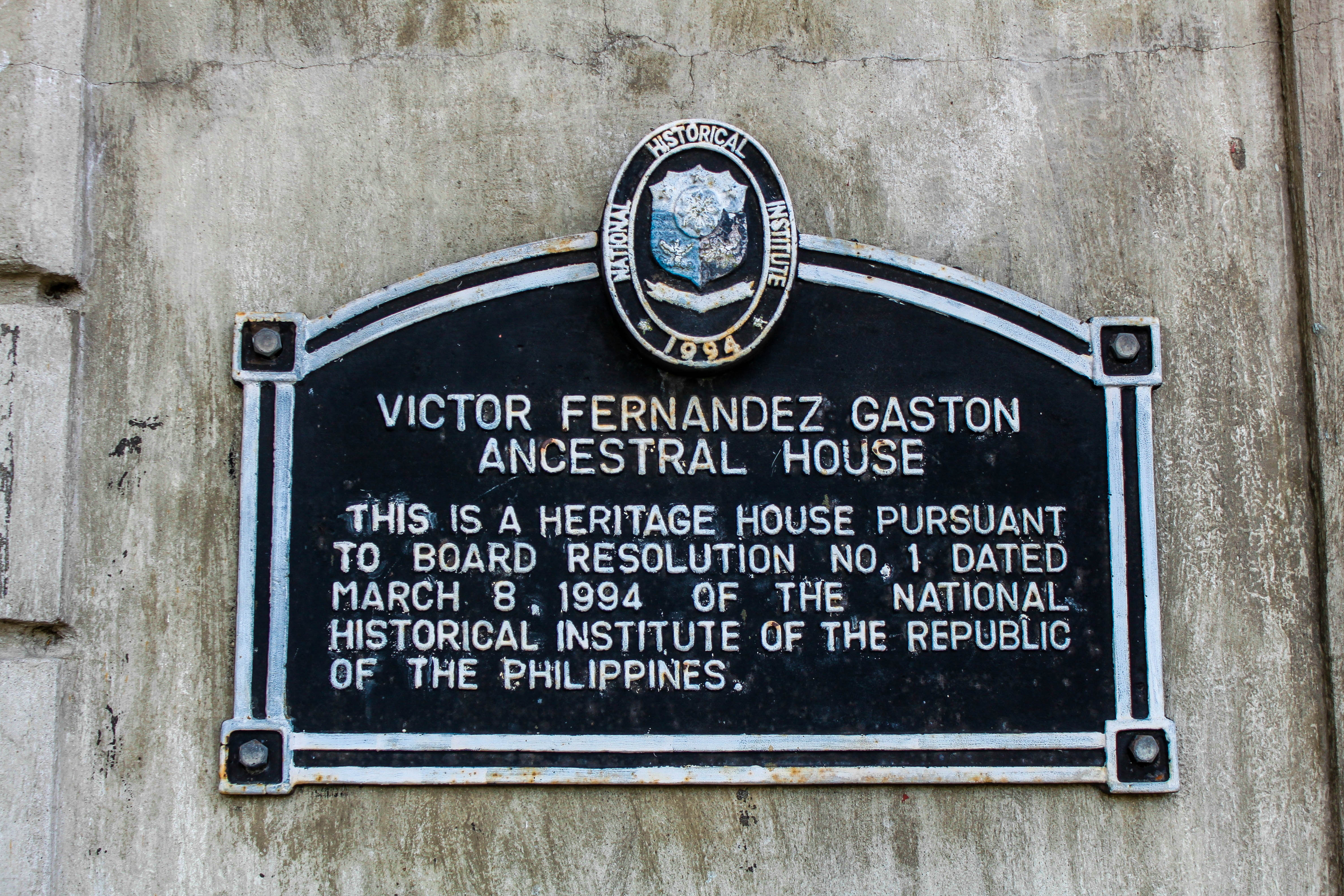
The marker of Balay Negrense.

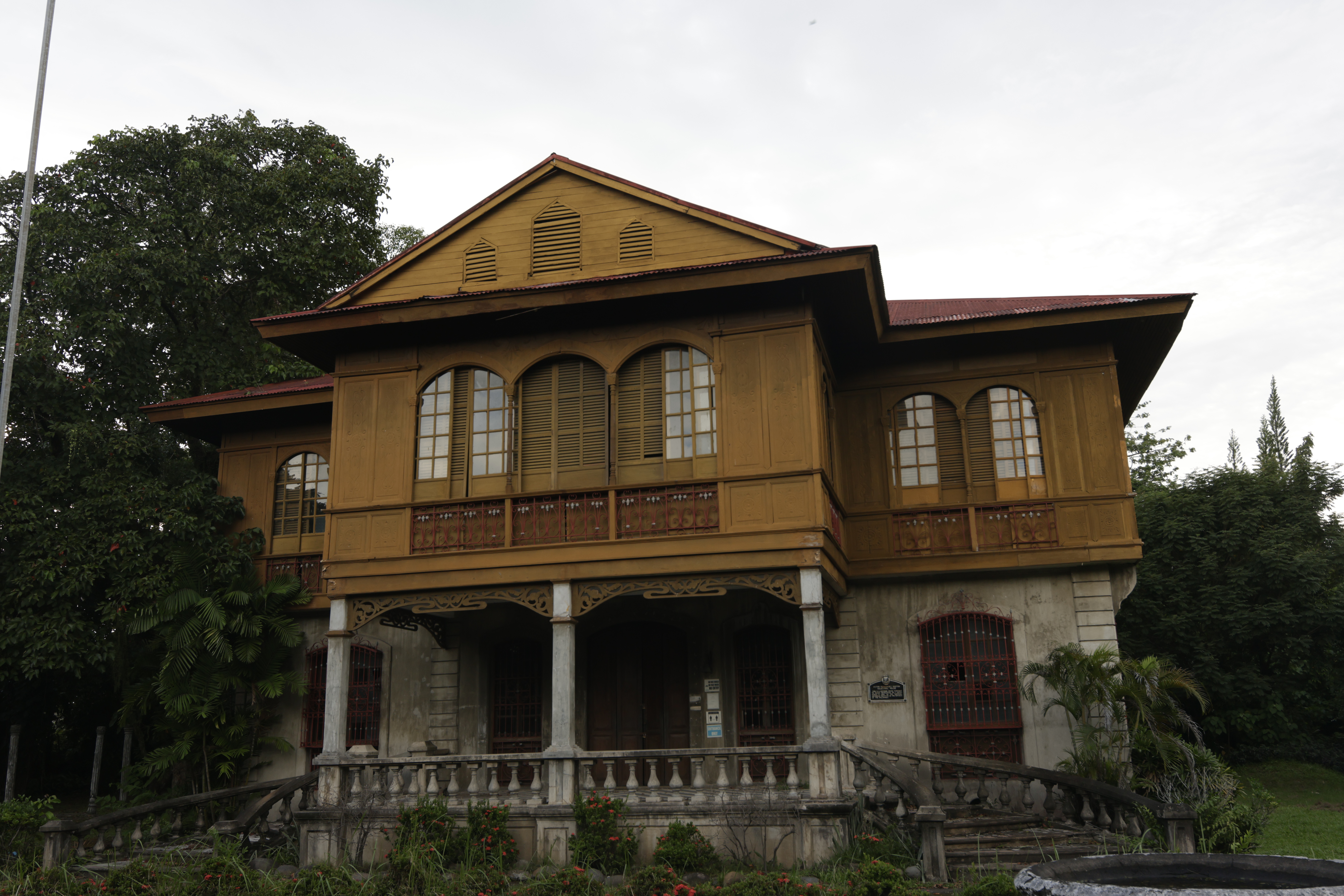
Balay Negrense in Silay.

The house has a four-metre high ceiling and large windows with ventanillas, smaller windows beneath the large windows with sliding panels that can be opened to admit the wind. The lower storey itself is elevated from ground level by a metre-high crawlspace, allowing the wooden foundations to be aired, preventing dampness from rotting the wood.

== See also ==
- Yves Leopold Germain Gaston
- Mariano Ramos Ancestral House
- The Ruins (mansion)
- Hacienda Rosalia
- Silliman Hall
- Dizon-Ramos Museum
- Museo Negrense de La Salle
