= Guapple pie =

Pie from the Philippines

Guapple Pie
- Type: Pie
- Course: Dessert
- Place of origin: Philippines
- Region or state: Silay City, Negros Occidental
- Created by: Alice Locsin Villanueva
- Serving temperature: Warm
- Main ingredients: Pie shell, Apple Guava, cinnamon, butter, salt

Guapple pie, sometimes known as guava pie, is a pie originating from Silay City, located in Negros Occidental, Philippines. The pie is named after its primary ingredient, guapple, a variety of large guava fruit known for its crisp texture and sweet-tart flavor.

== Description ==
Guapple Pie consists of a flaky, buttery pastry crust filled with slices of ripe guapple fruit. The filling is usually flavored with sugar, cinnamon, and sometimes other spices, balancing the natural tartness of the guapple with sweetness. The pie is typically baked until the crust turns golden brown, with the fruit filling softening to create a rich dessert. It is served either warm or at room temperature, often with coffee or as a dessert.

== Origin ==
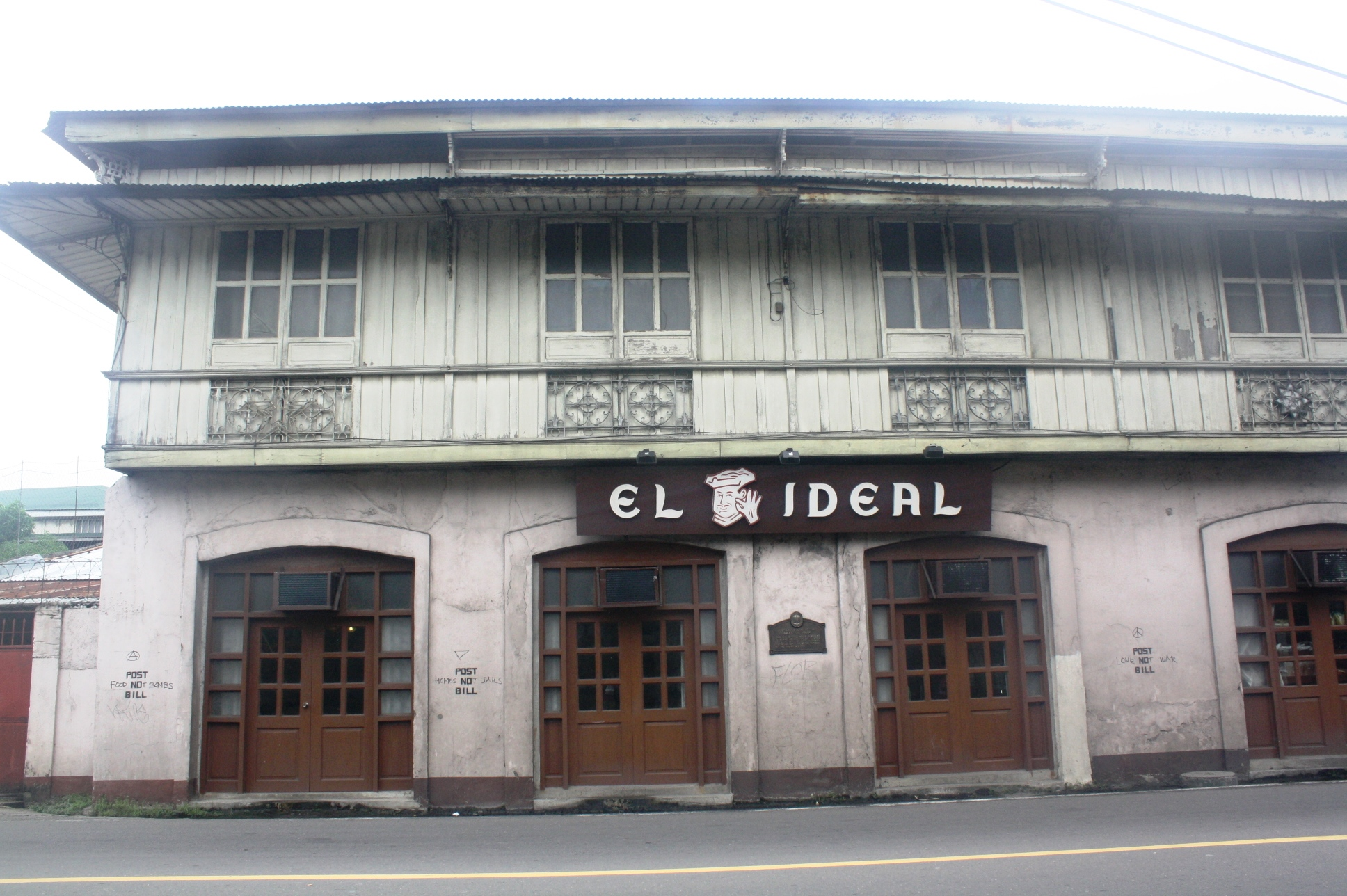
El Ideal Bakery from the highway.

The history of Guapple Pie is closely tied to the heritage of Silay City, a place known for its ancestral houses and strong culinary traditions. One of the key landmarks in the town is the Cesar Lacson Locsin Ancestral House, which is part of the Silay National Historical Landmark, recognized by the National Historical Commission of the Philippines.

The house shares its history with one of the oldest bakeshops in the region, El Ideal Bakery, founded in the 1920s by the late Cesar Lacson-Locsin. Originally known for its baked goods, El Ideal became renowned for its Guapple Pie, a creation born from necessity during the sugar crisis of the 1980s.

As sugar prices plummeted due to the rise of high-fructose alternatives, local sugarcane farmers sought new crops to cultivate, and the guapple fruit, a Vietnamese variety of guava, became a popular choice. Alice Locsin Villanueva, daughter of Cesar Lacson-Locsin, saw an opportunity in this shift and substituted the guapple fruit in the traditional American apple pie recipe.

== See also ==
- Buko pie
- Piaya
- List of Philippine desserts
- List of pies, tarts and flans
