= Silliman Hall =

Local museum in Negros Oriental, Philippines

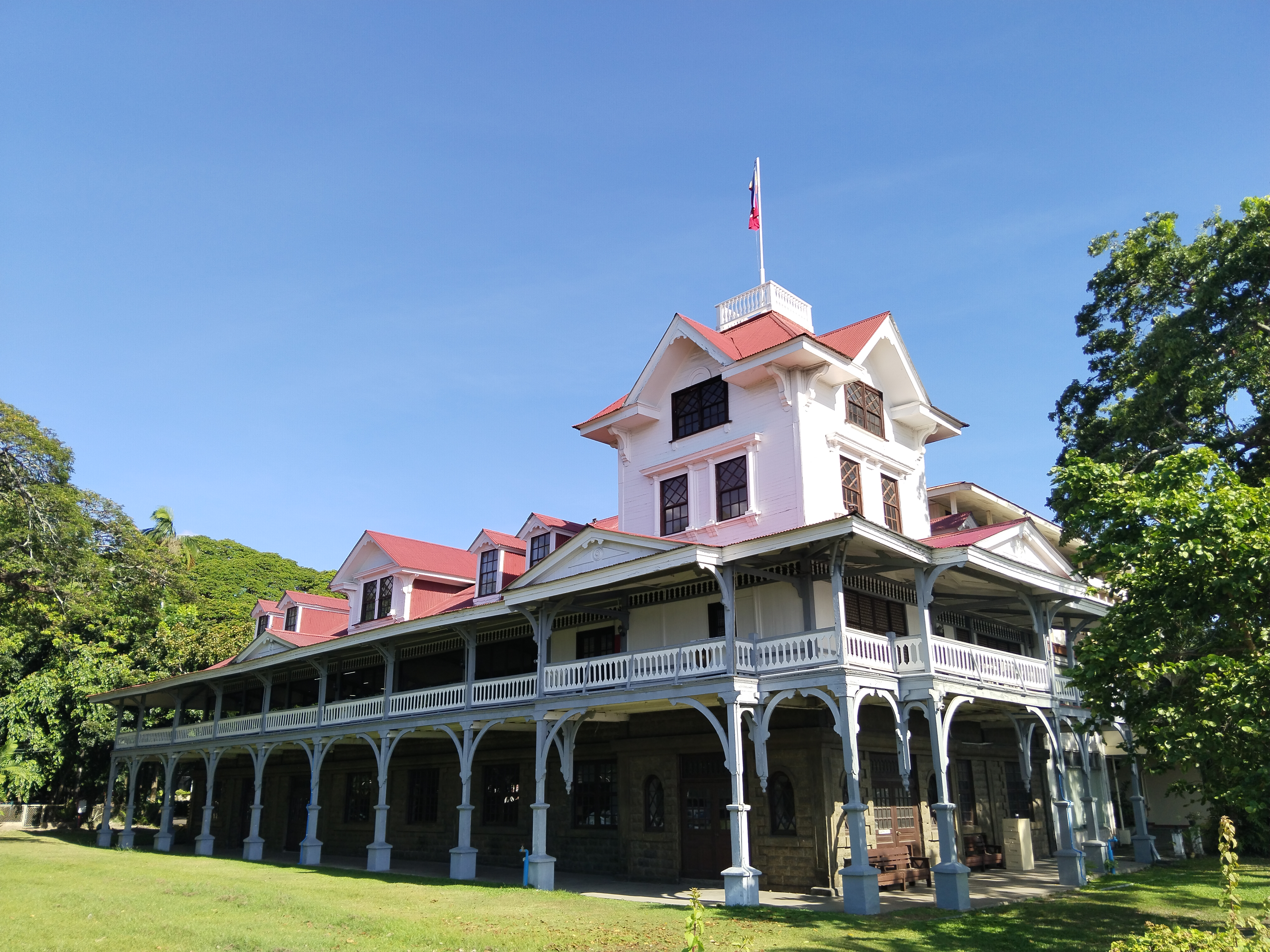
- Silliman Hall
- Established: 1909 (1902 - Original Built)
- Location: Dumaguete, Negros Oriental, Philippines
- Coordinates: 9°18′39″N 123°18′32″E
- Type: Local museum, ancestral house
- Founder: Horace B. Silliman
- Building details
- Location in the Visayas Location in the Philippines

General information
- Status: Completed
- Architectural style: American architecture
- Location: Dumaguete, Negros Oriental, Philippines
- Construction started: 1909 (1902 - Original Built), 1970 (established as museum)

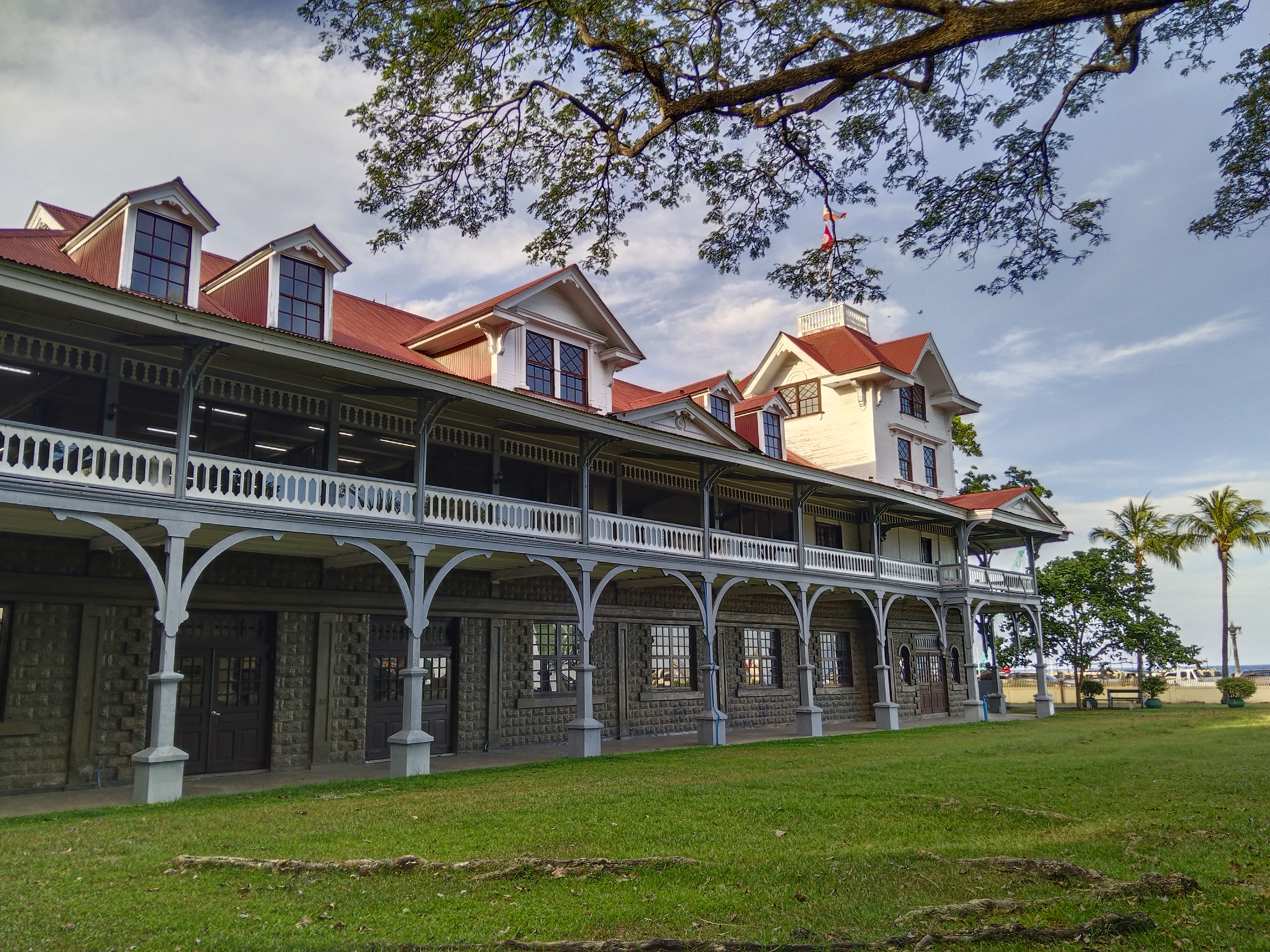
Silliman University Silliman Hall

The Silliman Hall is a building constructed in the Stick Style of American architecture in Dumaguete, Negros Oriental, Philippines. It was built in the early 1900s. It was converted to a museum in 1970. It is located in Dumaguete, Negros Oriental, Philippines.

== Exhibits ==
The collections are divided into two categories and seven galleries. It includes artifacts from the indigenous Negritos and the Islamic period and as early as 200 BC.

== See also ==
- Balay Negrense
- The Ruins (mansion)
- Hacienda Rosalia
- Dizon-Ramos Museum
- Museo Negrense de La Salle
- Dr. Jose Corteza Locsin Ancestral house
