= Museo Negrense de La Salle =

- Established: 1997
- Location: University of St. La Salle, Bacolod, Negros Occidental, Philippines
- Coordinates: 10°40′43″N 122°57′45″E
- Type: Local museum
- Website: www.usls.edu.ph/Museo%20Negrense/
- Building details
- Location in the Visayas Location in the Philippines
- Alternative names: Museo Negrense

General information
- Status: Completed
- Location: University of St. La Salle, Bacolod, Negros Occidental, Philippines
- Construction started: 1997

The Museo Negrense de La Salle (lit. 'Negrense de La Salle Museum') is located within the campus of the University of St. La Salle in Bacolod, Philippines beside the St. La Salle Coliseum. It is the only school-based museum in the Negros region.

== History ==
The museum was officially named Museo Negrense de La Salle in 1997. The Administration decided to fuse the University Research Institute with the repository and the addition of artifacts and relics donated by the Vega family under the care of Cecile Nava, PhD.

== Collections ==
- The Ledesma Collection
- The Vega Collection
- The Esteban Collection
- The Velayo-Javelosa Collection
- The Puentevella Collection

== See also ==
- Balay Negrense
- The Ruins (mansion)
- Hacienda Rosalia
- Silliman Hall
- Dizon-Ramos Museum
- Dr. Jose Corteza Locsin Ancestral House
