= Hacienda Rosalia =

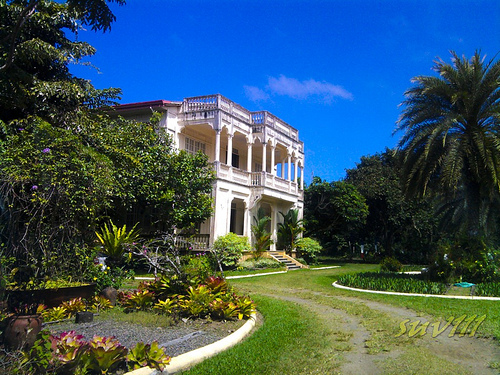
- Gaston Mansion
- Established: 1930
- Location: Manapla, Negros Occidental, Philippines
- Coordinates: 10.9120°N 123.1464°E
- Type: Local museum, ancestral house
- Owner: Jose Gaston
- Website: https://www.facebook.com/pages/Gaston-Mansion-Hacienda-Sta-Rosalia-Manapla/341788559245577
- Building details
- Alternative names: The Chapel of the Cartwheels, Gaston Mansion

General information
- Status: Completed
- Type: House
- Architectural style: Victorian architecture
- Location: Manapla Negros Occidental, Philippines
- Current tenants: Msgr. Guillermo “Gigi” Gaston
- Construction started: 1930s

Hacienda Rosalia, also known as Hacienda Santa Rosalia, is a compound where the ancestral home mansion of Gaston family and the Church of Cartwheels are located. It is situated in Manapla, Negros Occidental, Philippines. The mansion was built in 1930s.

== History ==
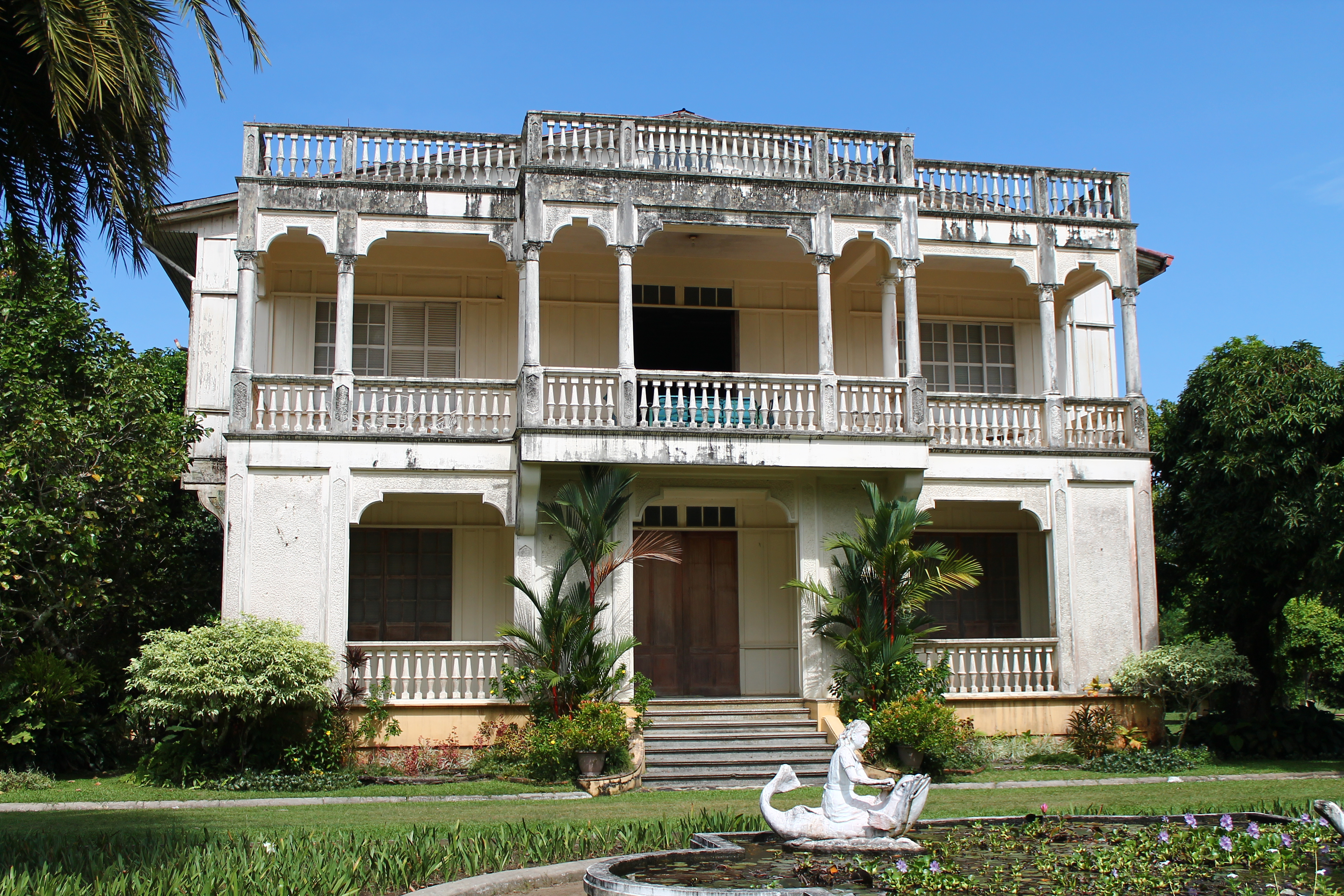
Gaston Mansion, Manapla

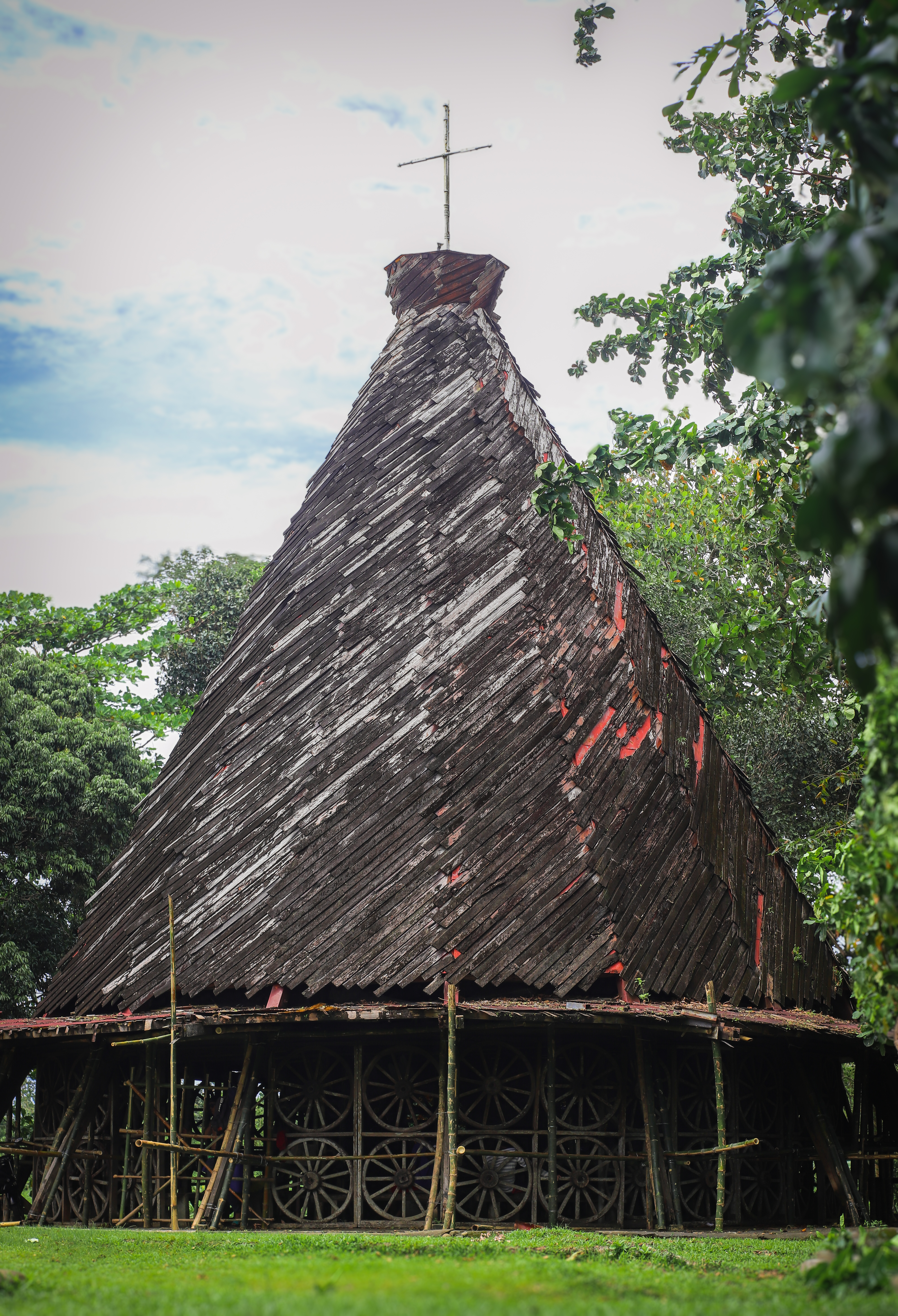
The Chapel of the Cartwheels

Hacienda Santa Rosalia is a sugar plantation owned by Jose Gaston, one of the sons of Victor Gaston, a sugar planter of Negros. He was married to Consuelo Azcona and had 8 children. The Gaston Mansion was built in the 1930s. It is set in lush, verdant and gorgeous garden of flowers, shrubs, trees, potted palms and herbs. Within the grounds are a fresh water swimming pool (used as hiding place during World War II), a Victorian fountain, a basketball court, a windmill, and a time-worn shoe house (which was used before as a playground). The Chapel of the Cartwheels is also situated a few meters away from the ancestral home. The Gaston family originated from the Frenchman Yves Leopold Germain Gaston. He is credited as the first to commercially produce cane sugar, the primary product of the province.

== Media ==
Hacienda Rosalia is also been used as a setting and location shoot for films, most notable of which is the 1982 epic Oro, Plata, Mata.

== House of Gaston ==
The house of Yves Leopold Germain Gaston's eldest son Victor in Silay City is now a museum open to the public and is officially called the Balay Negrense (Hiligaynon, "The Negrense House").

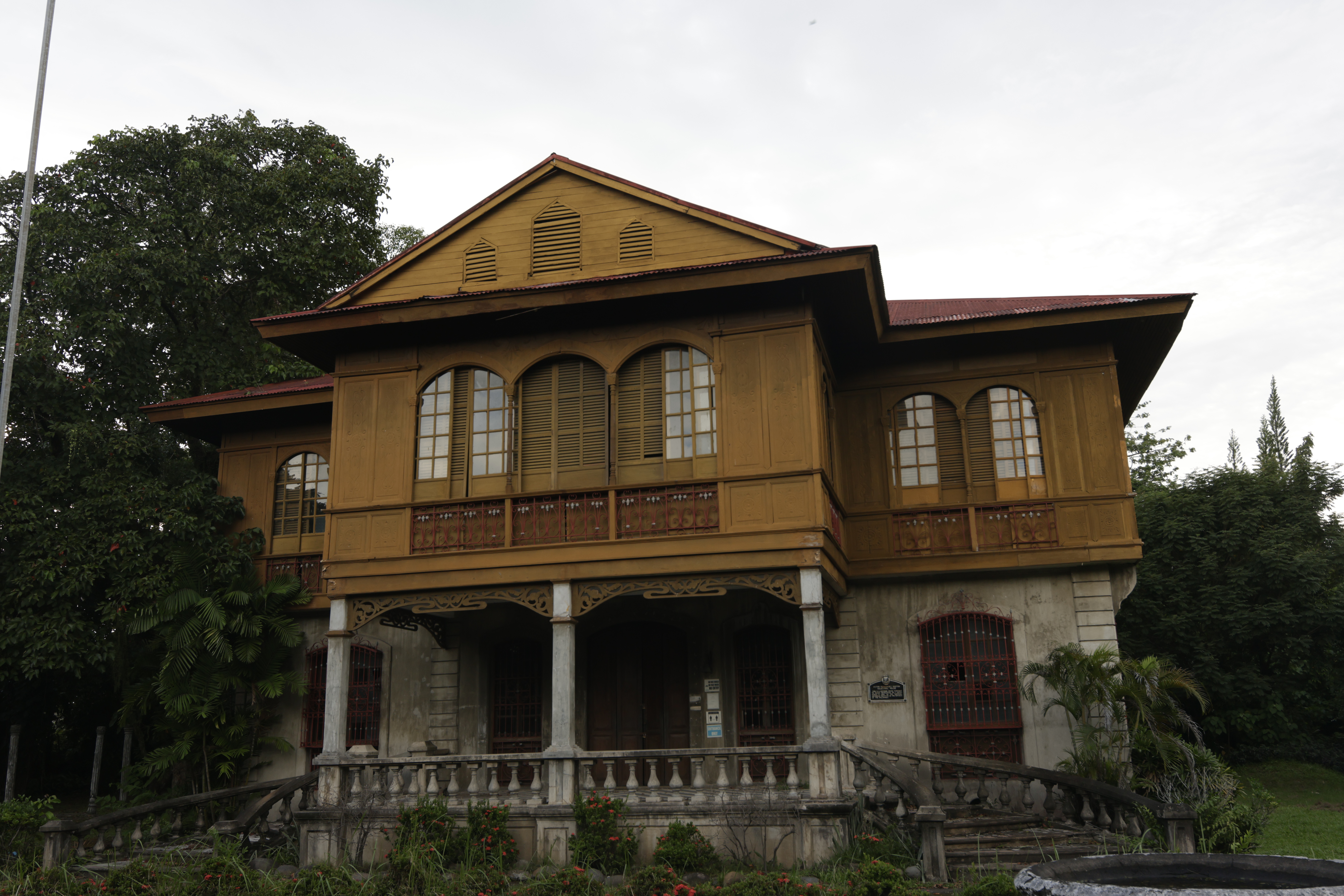
Balay Negrense in Silay City

== See also ==
- Balay Negrense
- The Lacson Ruins
- Silliman Hall
- Dizon-Ramos Museum
- Museo Negrense de La Salle
- Dr. Jose Corteza Locsin Ancestral House
