= The Ruins (mansion) =

The Lacson Ruins
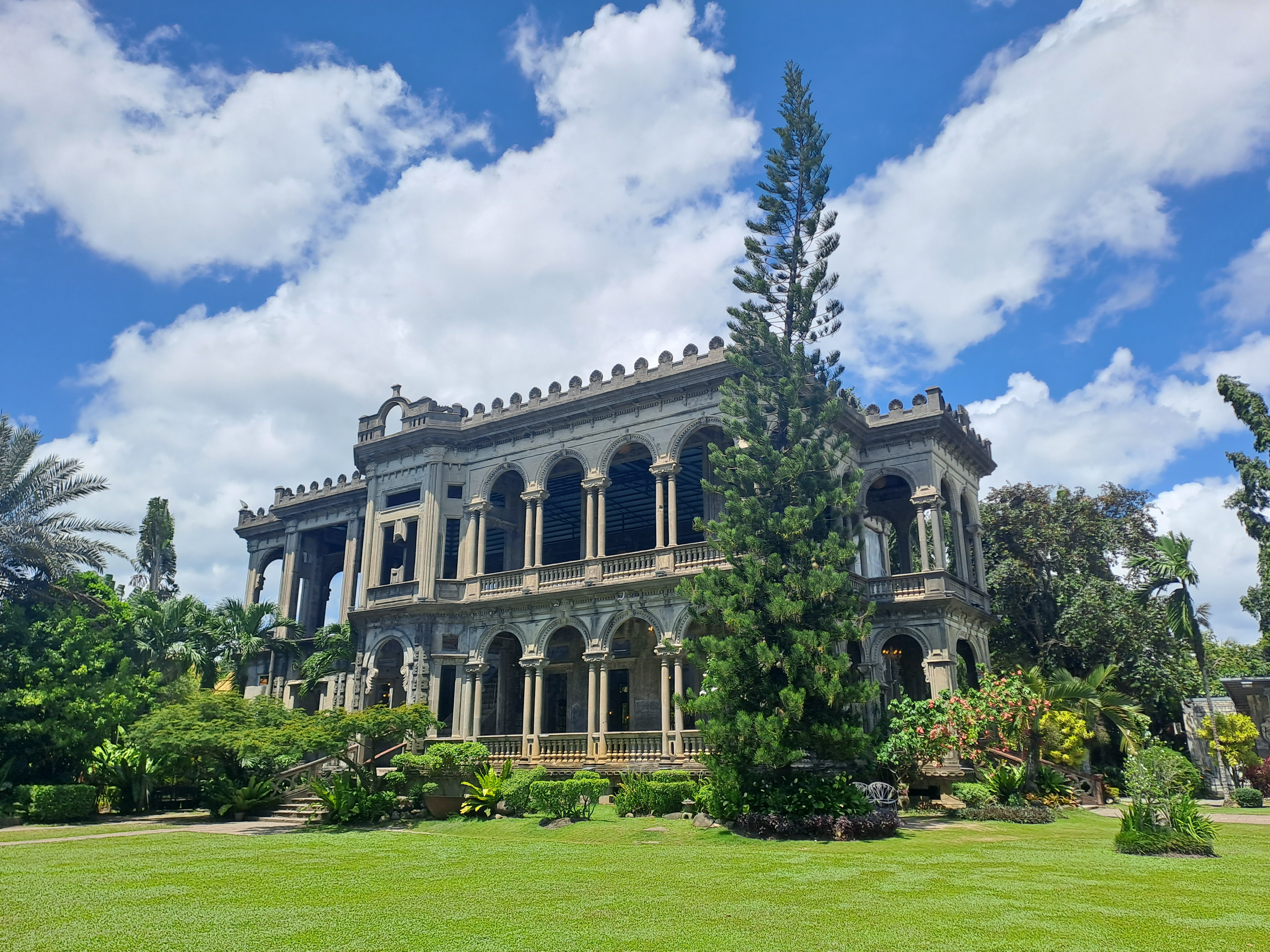
- The Ruins in August 2023

- Map of Negros Occidental showing the location of Talisay
- Former name: Taj Mahal of Philippines
- Established: Early 1900
- Location: Talisay, Negros Occidental, Philippines
- Coordinates: 10.7102°N 122.9833°E
- Type: Private in-situ open-air local museum
- Key holdings: Ruined ancestral house at a large farm.
- Collection size: 440 hectares (1,100 acres)
- Owners: Mariano Ledesma Lacson; Maria Braga Lacson
- Website: theruins.com.ph
- Building details
- Alternative names: The Ruins

General information
- Status: Preserved as dilapidated
- Type: House
- Architectural style: Italian architecture
- Location: Talisay, Negros Occidental, Philippines
- Construction started: Early 1900
- Owner: Lacson-Javellana

The Lacson Ruins are the remains of the ancestral mansion of Don Mariano Ledesma Lacson and Maria Braga Lacson. It is situated in Talisay, Negros Occidental, Philippines. The mansion was built in the early 1900s and was inspired by Italian architecture.

== History ==
The Lacson Ruins, located on a 440-hectare sugar plantation in Talisay, Negros Occidental, is the ancestral mansion of Don Mariano Lacson, a wealthy sugar businessman of the Lacson clan.

Don Mariano Lacson was the son of Lucio Lacson y Petronila and Clara Lacson y Ledesma, who moved to Negros during the diaspora of Iloilo sugar families in the late 1800s. He was also the brother of notable figures, including General Aniceto Lacson, a Negrense revolutionary general and president of the Cantonal Republic of Negros, Rosendo Lacson, a signatory to Aniceto's Cantonal Republic of Negros, and Don Domingo Lacson Sr., who founded Sta. Clara Estate Inc. and developer of the Sta. Clara Subdivisions.

The mansion was constructed in the early 1900s in memory of his late wife, Maria Braga Lacson, who died while giving birth to their eighth child.

During World War II, Filipino guerrillas took decisive action to prevent Japanese forces from using the mansion as a military headquarters. They set the mansion ablaze, and the fire raged for three days, reducing it to ruins. Despite the extensive damage, the foundations remained intact.

For generations, Lacson's heirs consistently maintained the property, valuing its sentimental significance, especially in memory of his wife. Today, the Lacson Ruins is considered to be one of the most iconic architectural landmarks of the Philippines, symbolizing both historical resilience and personal legacy.

== Current status ==
Known variously as the "Taj Mahal of Talisay", "Taj Mahal of Negros" and "Taj Mahal of the Philippines", it is in the private ownership of the descendants of Don Mariano Ledesma Lacson and Cora Maria Osorio Rosa-Braga. They have preserved it in its ruined state, among operational farmland, as a tourist attraction that can be visited for a fee or hired for events. It is open to daily visitors from 8am to 8pm for an entrance fee of PHP150 for adults, PHP100 for senior citizens or PWD, PHP 80 for students and free for children. The fee is PHP1000 for those who will take photoshoots.

== Gallery ==
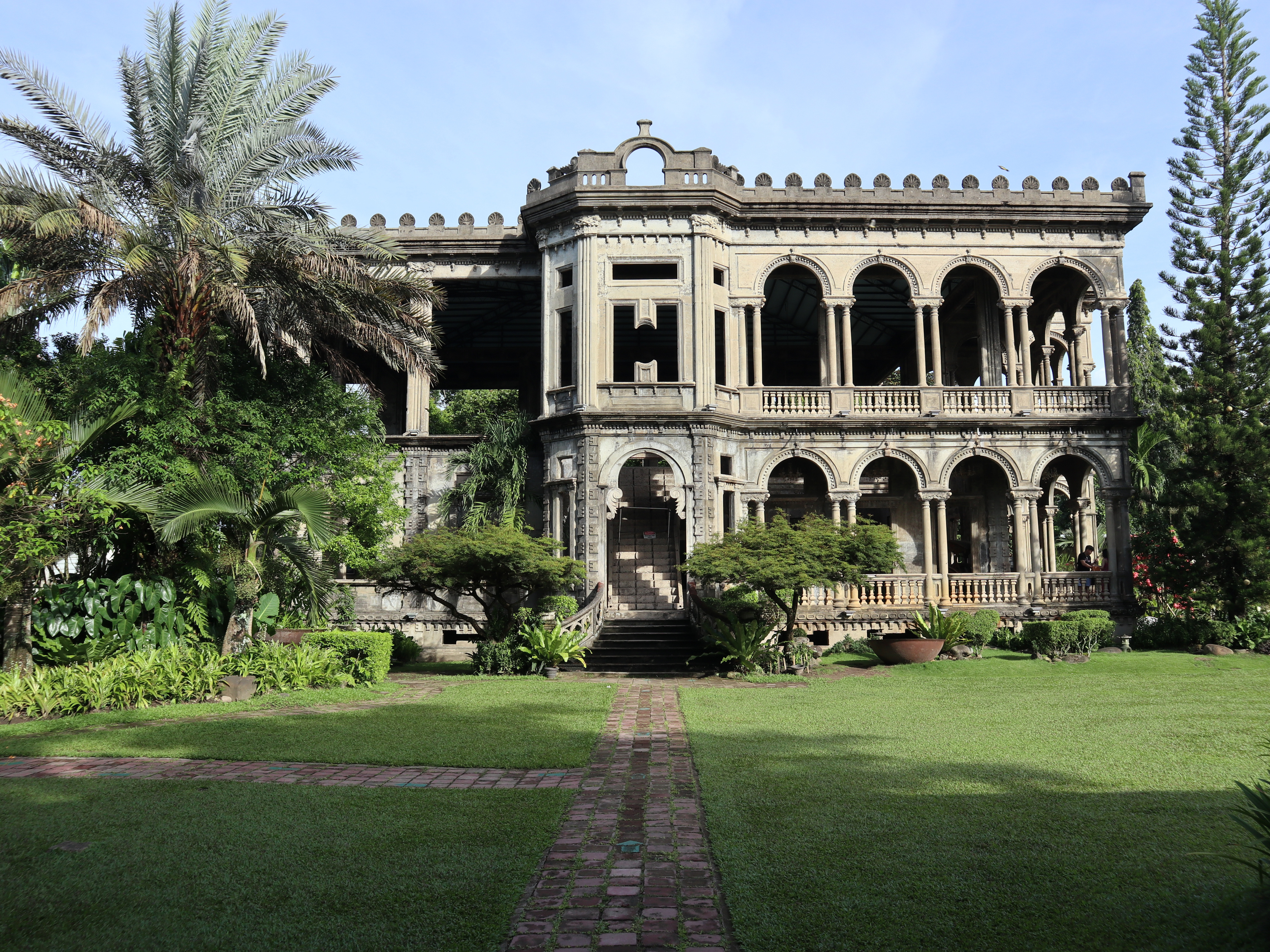
West façade

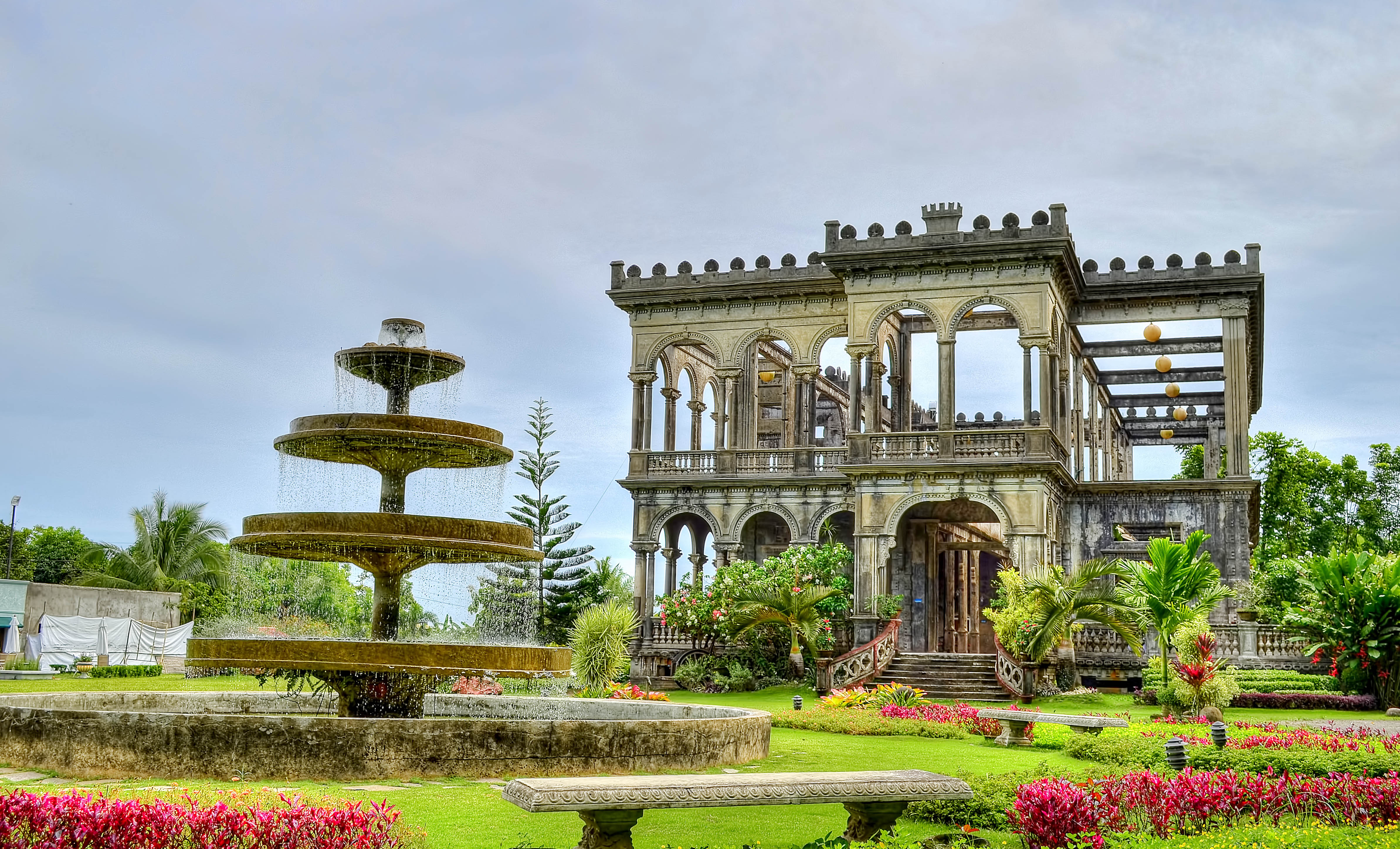
South façade with fountain

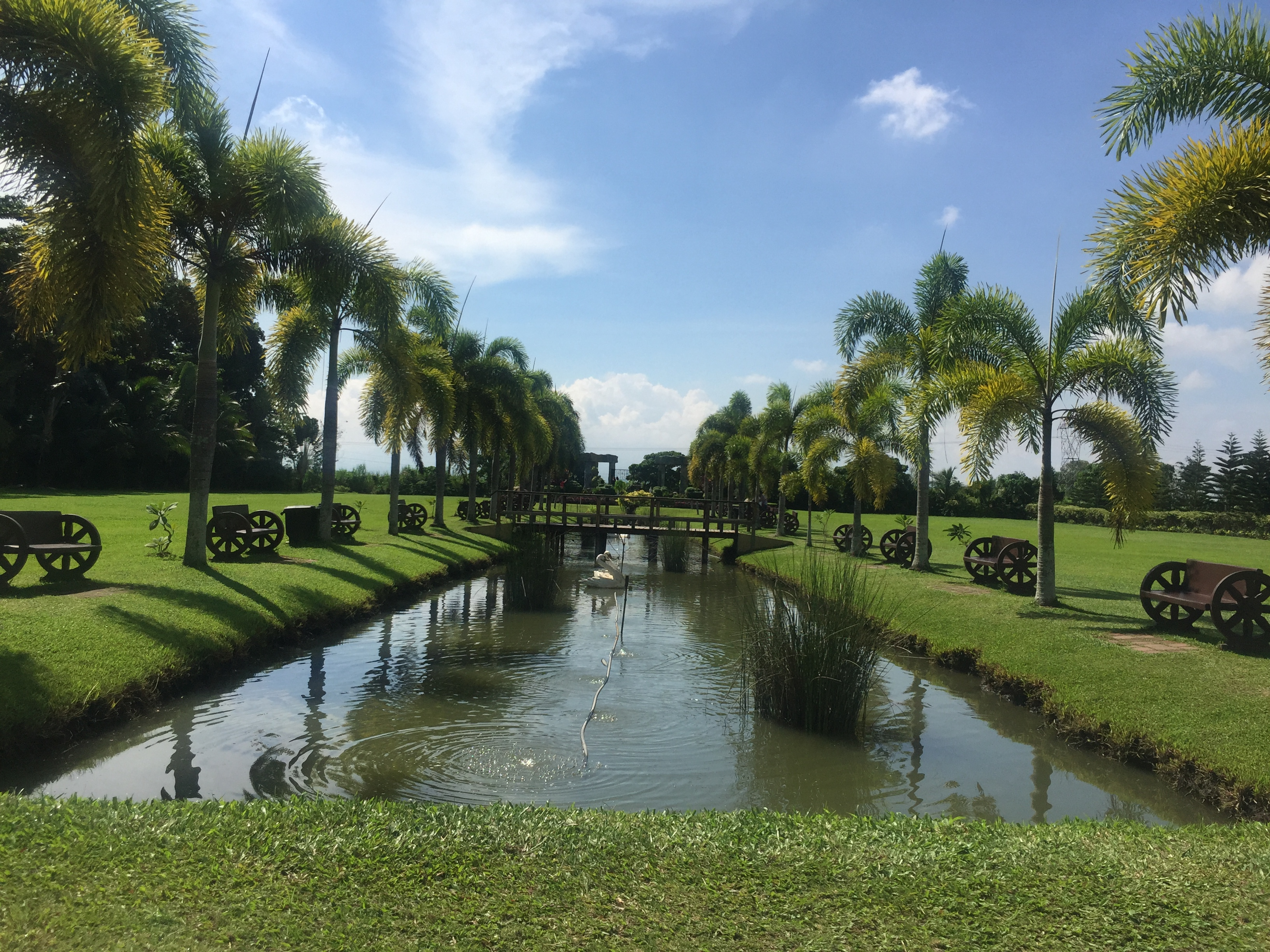
Mansion garden

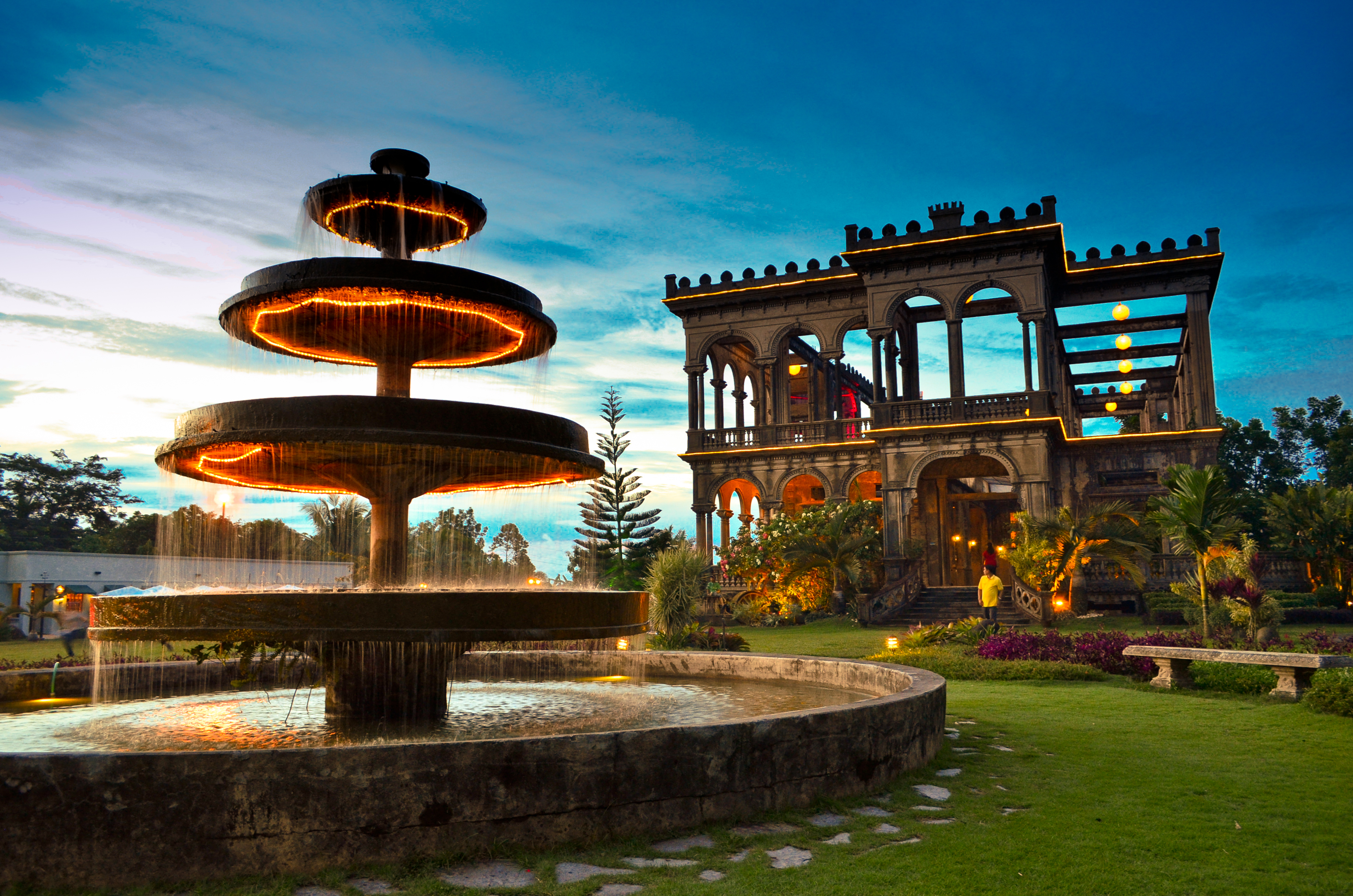
The Ruins at dusk

== See also ==
- Lacson family
- Gen. Aniceto Lacson
- Balay Negrense
- Hacienda Rosalia
- Cesar Lacson Locsin Ancestral House
- Lacson–Yusay/Yusay–Consing Ancestral House
- Ancestral Houses of the Philippines
