= Bacolod =

Highly-urbanized city in Negros Island Region, Philippines

- Highly urbanized city
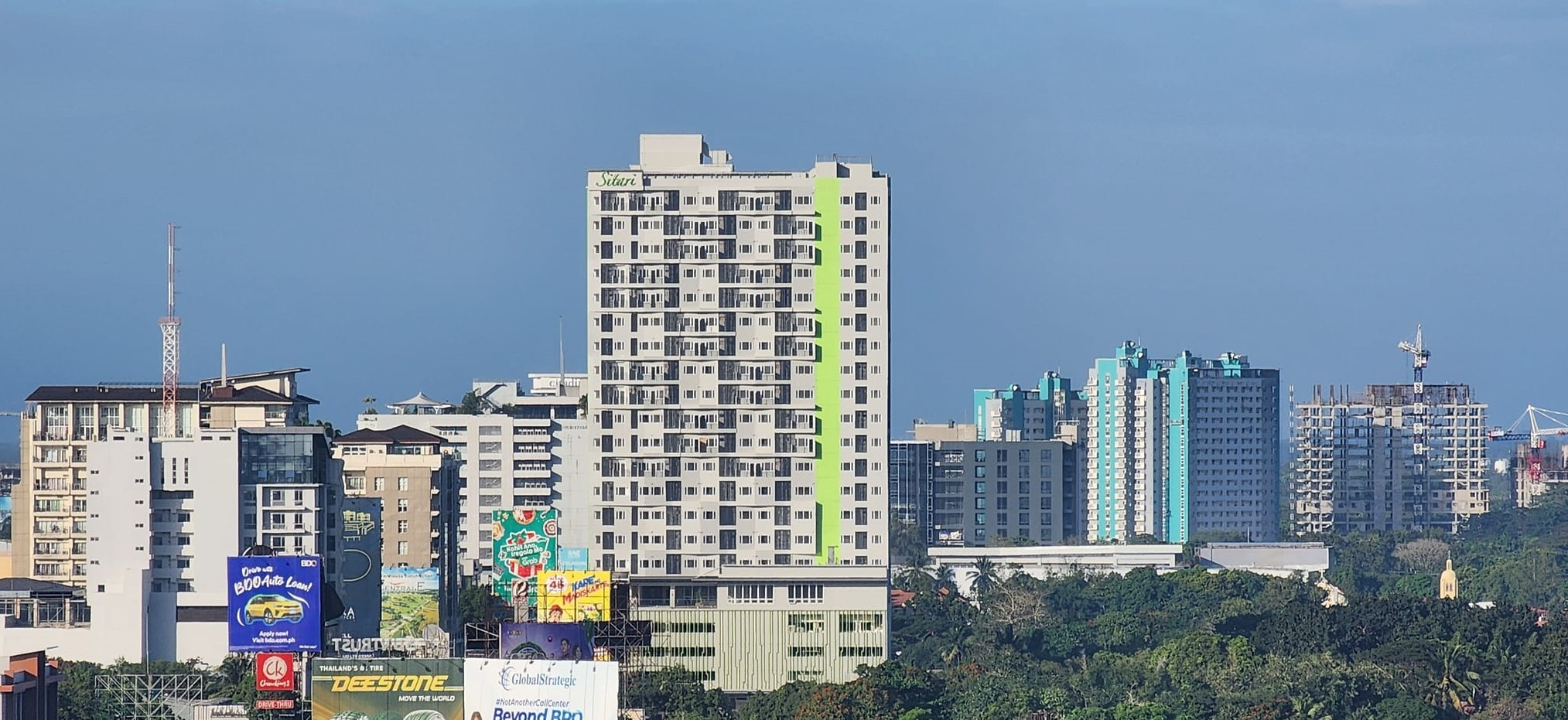
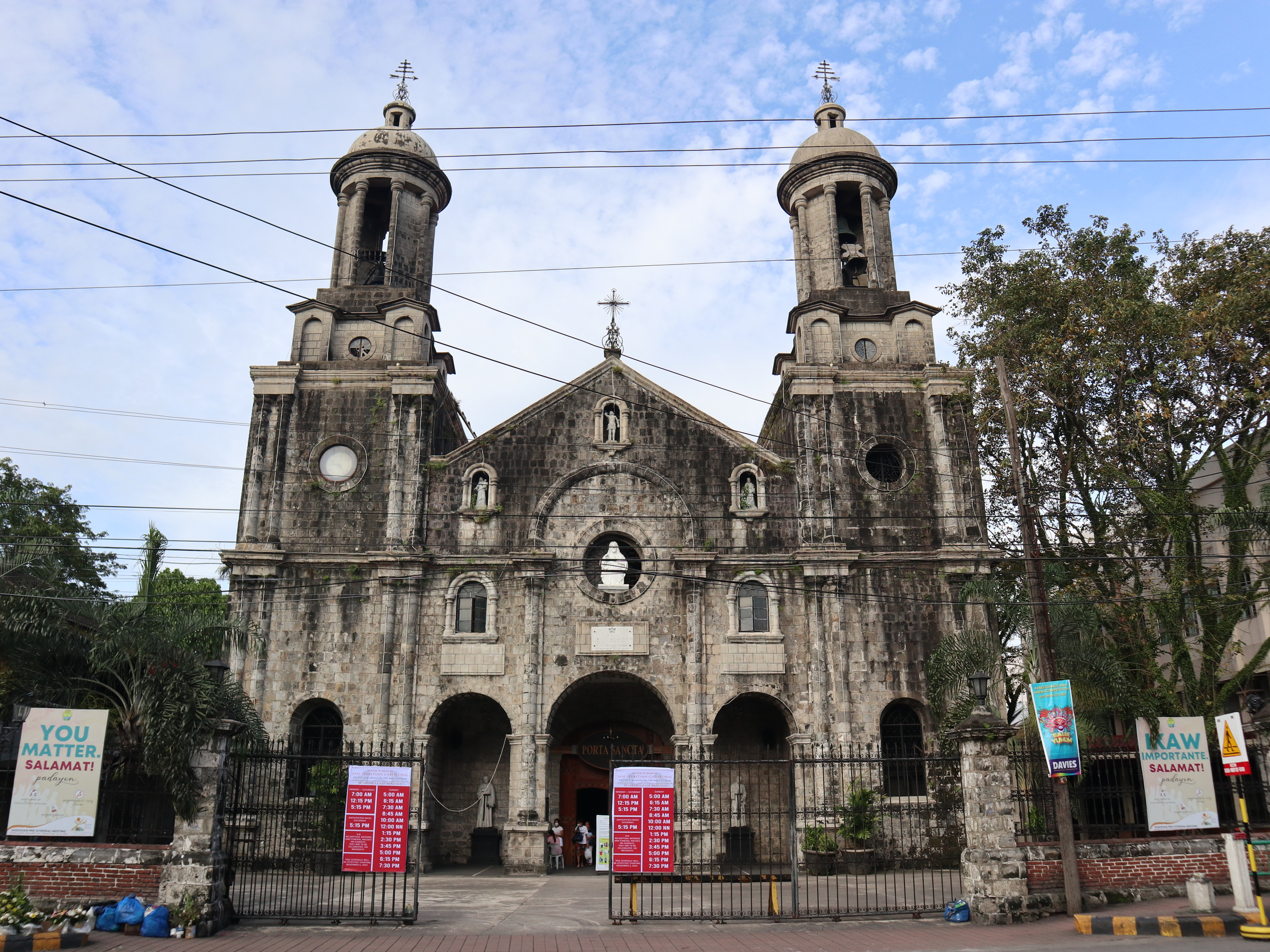
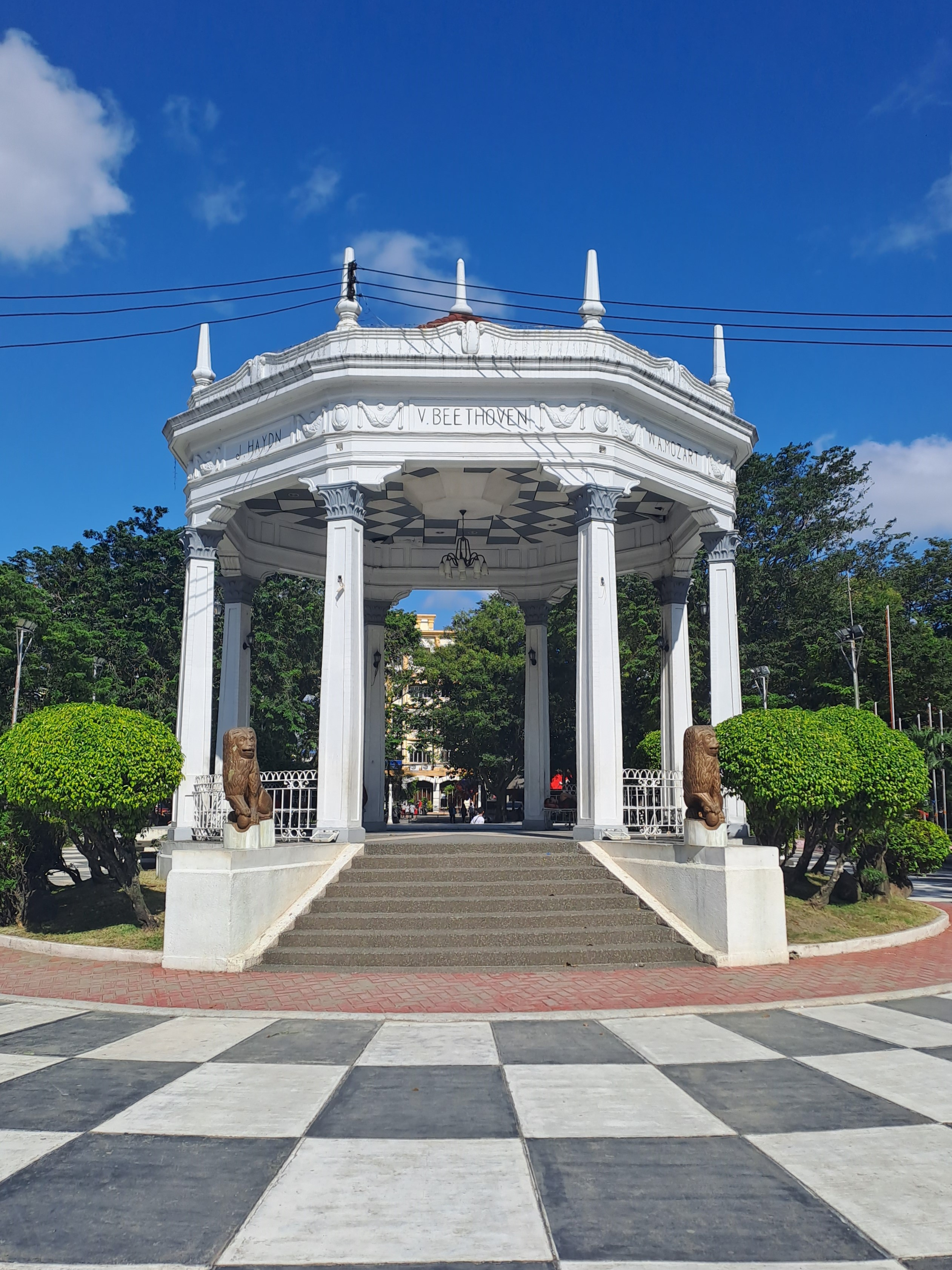
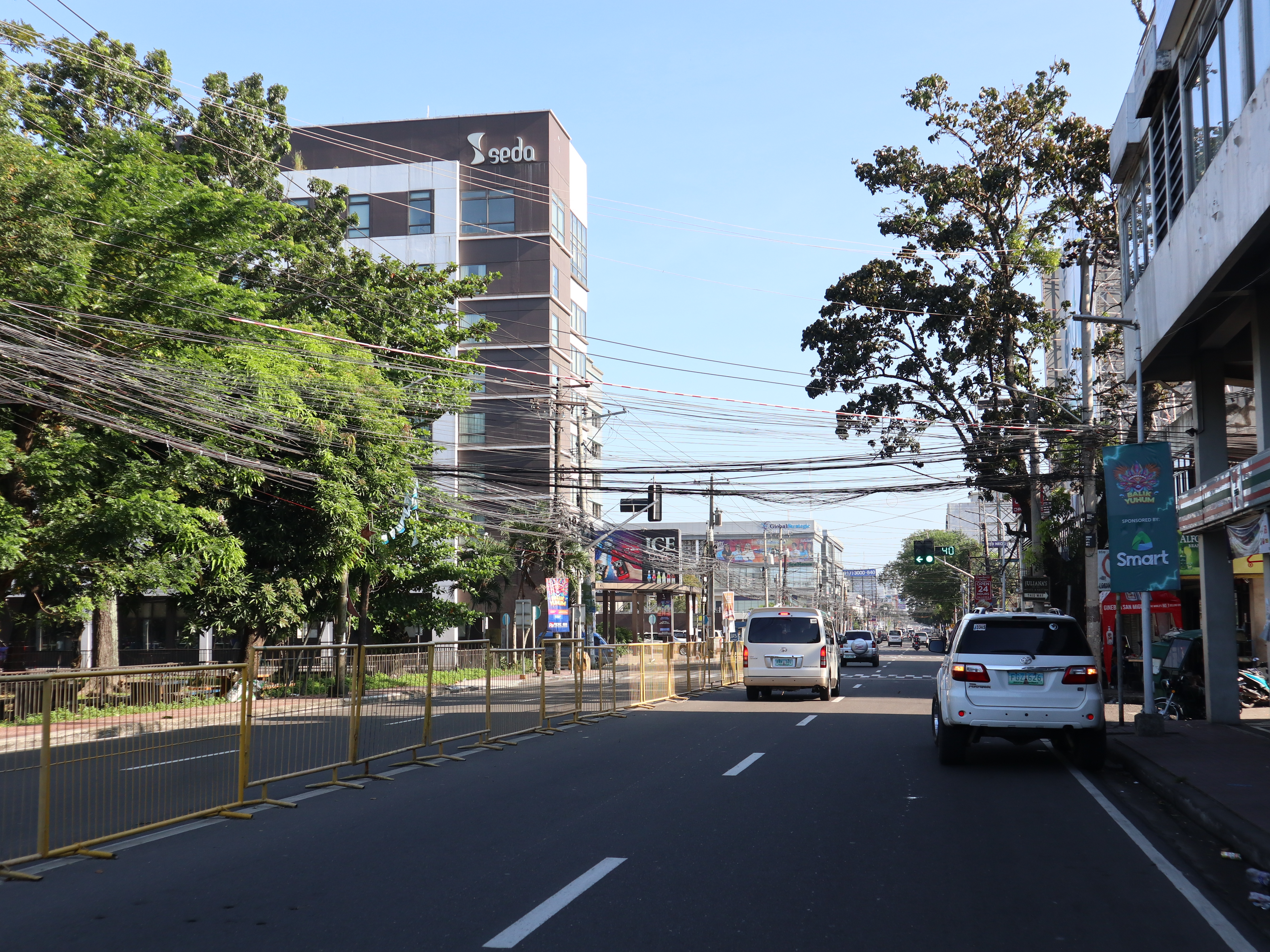
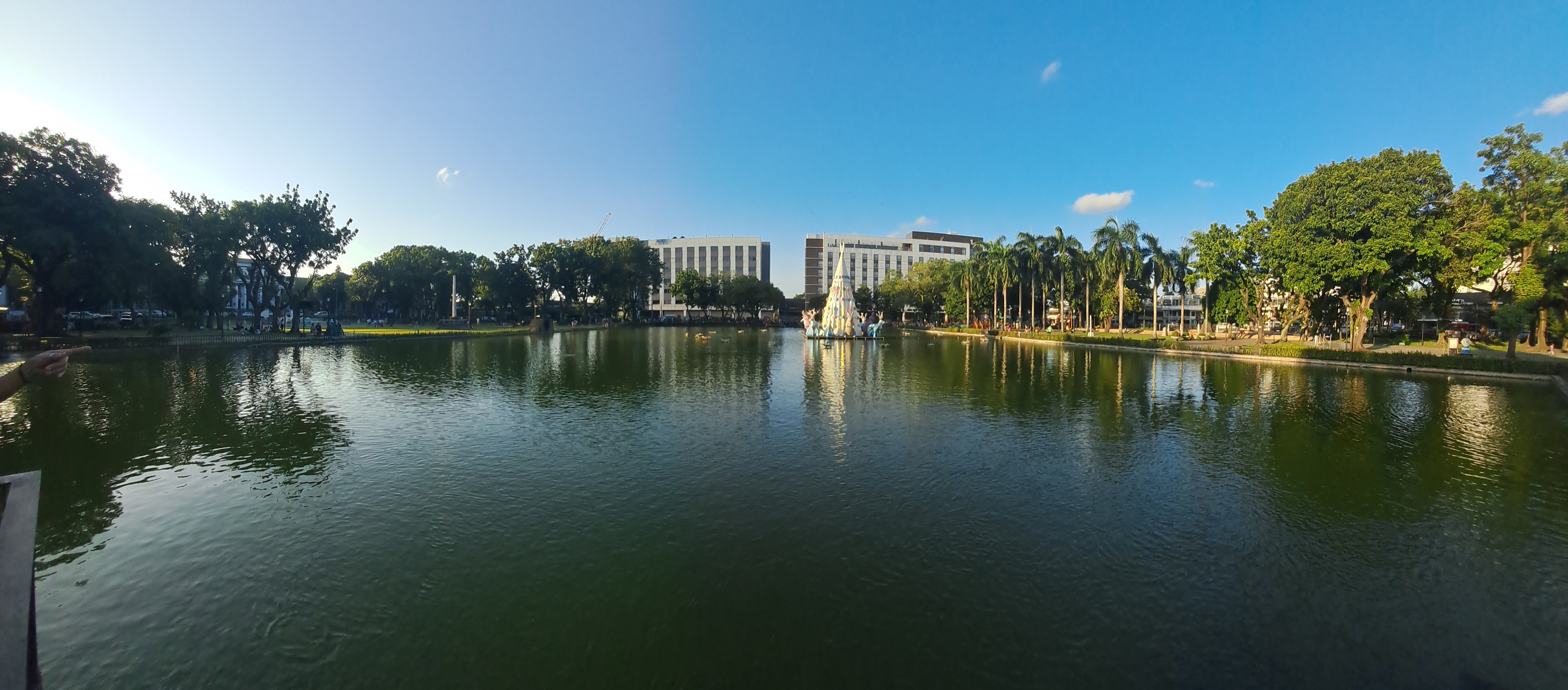
- From top, left to right: Bacolod central skyline; San Sebastian Cathedral, Bacolod Public Plaza, Bacolod City Government Center, Lacson Street, Capitol Park and Lagoon

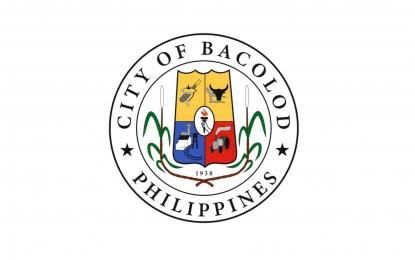
- Flag Seal
- Nickname: "The City of Smiles"
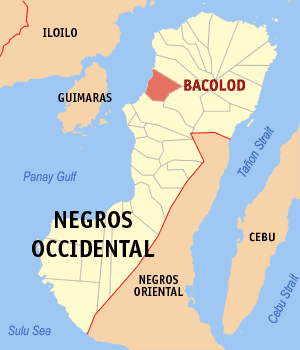
- Map of Negros Island Region with Bacolod highlighted
- Interactive map of Bacolod
- Location within the Philippines
- Coordinates: 10°40′35″N 122°57′03″E
- Country: Philippines
- Region: Negros Island Region
- Province: Negros Occidental (geographically only)
- District: Lone district
- Founded: 1755 or 1756 (town)
- Cityhood: June 18, 1938 (de jure); October 19, 1938 (de facto)
- Highly urbanized city: September 27, 1984
- Barangays: 61 (see Barangays)

Government
  - Mayor: Greg G. Gasataya
  - Vice Mayor: Claudio Jesus Raymundo A. Puentevella (NPC)
  - Representative: Albee B. Benitez (Ind)
  - City Council: Members: Caesar Z. Distrito; Israel P. Salanga; Em L. Ang; Jude Thaddeus A. Sayson; Jason Isidro S. Villarosa; Celia Matea R. Flor; Dindo C. Ramos; Roberto Antonio M. Rojas, Sr.; Wilson C. Gamboa, Jr.; Psyche Marie E. Sy; Homer Q. Bais; Al Victor A. Espino; Lady Gles G. Pallen ^{‡}; Danna Marie C. Barzo ^{◌}; ‡ ex officio ABC president; ◌ ex officio SK chairman
  - Electorate: 355,880 voters (2025)

Area
  - City: 162.67 km^{2} (62.81 sq mi)
  - Metro: 2,265.30 km^{2} (874.64 sq mi)
- Elevation: 105 m (344 ft)
- Highest elevation: 1,461 m (4,793 ft)
- Lowest elevation: 0 m (0 ft)

Population (2024 census)
  - City: 624,787
  - Density: 3,840.8/km^{2} (9,947.7/sq mi)
  - Metro: 1,435,593
  - Metro density: 633.732/km^{2} (1,641.36/sq mi)
  - Households: 142,936
- Demonyms: Hiligaynon (Ilonggo): Bacolodnon; English: Bacolodian; Spanish: Bacoleño (masculine)/Bacoleña (feminine)

Economy
  - Gross domestic product (GDP): ₱120,933 billion (2021) $2,400 billion (2021)
  - Income class: 1st city income class
  - Poverty incidence: 9.3% (2023)
  - Revenue: ₱ 3,492 million (2024)
  - Assets: ₱ 11,759 million (2024)
  - Expenditure: ₱ 3,166 million (2024)
  - Liabilities: ₱ 5,314 million (2024)

Service provider
  - Electricity: Negros Electric and Power Corporation (NEPC)
- Time zone: UTC+8 (PST)
- ZIP code: 6100
- PSGC: 1830200000
- IDD : area code: +63 (0)34
- Languages: Hiligaynon; Filipino; English
- Website: bacolodcity.gov.ph

Bacolod, officially the City of Bacolod (/bɑːˈkɔːləd/; Tagalog: [bɐˈkɔlɔd]; Hiligaynon: Dakbanwa sang Bacolod; Filipino: Lungsod ng Bacolod), is a highly urbanized city in the Negros Island Region in the Philippines. According to the 2024 census, it has a population of 624,787 people, making it the most populous city in the Negros Island Region and the second most populous city in the entire Visayas after Cebu City.

It is the largest city and capital of the province of Negros Occidental where it is geographically situated and grouped under the province by the Philippine Statistics Authority, although it operates as an administratively independent city. It serves as one of the two regional centers of Negros Island Region, alongside Dumaguete, and is the core of the Bacolod metropolitan area.

The city is known for the MassKara Festival, held during the third week of October, and for its nickname "The City of Smiles". The city is also famous for its local delicacies such as piaya, cansi, napoleones, and chicken inasal.

== Etymology ==
Bacólod (English: Bacolod), is derived from bakólod (Old Spelling: bacólod), the Old Hiligaynon (Old Ilonggo) (Old Spelling: Ylongo and Ilongo) word for a "hill, turtle, mound, rise, hillock, down, any small eminence or elevation", since the resettlement was founded on a stony, hilly area, now the barangay of Granada. It was officially called Ciudad de Bacólod (City of Bacolod) when Municipalidad de Bacólod (Municipality of Bacolod) was converted into a city in 1938.

== History ==
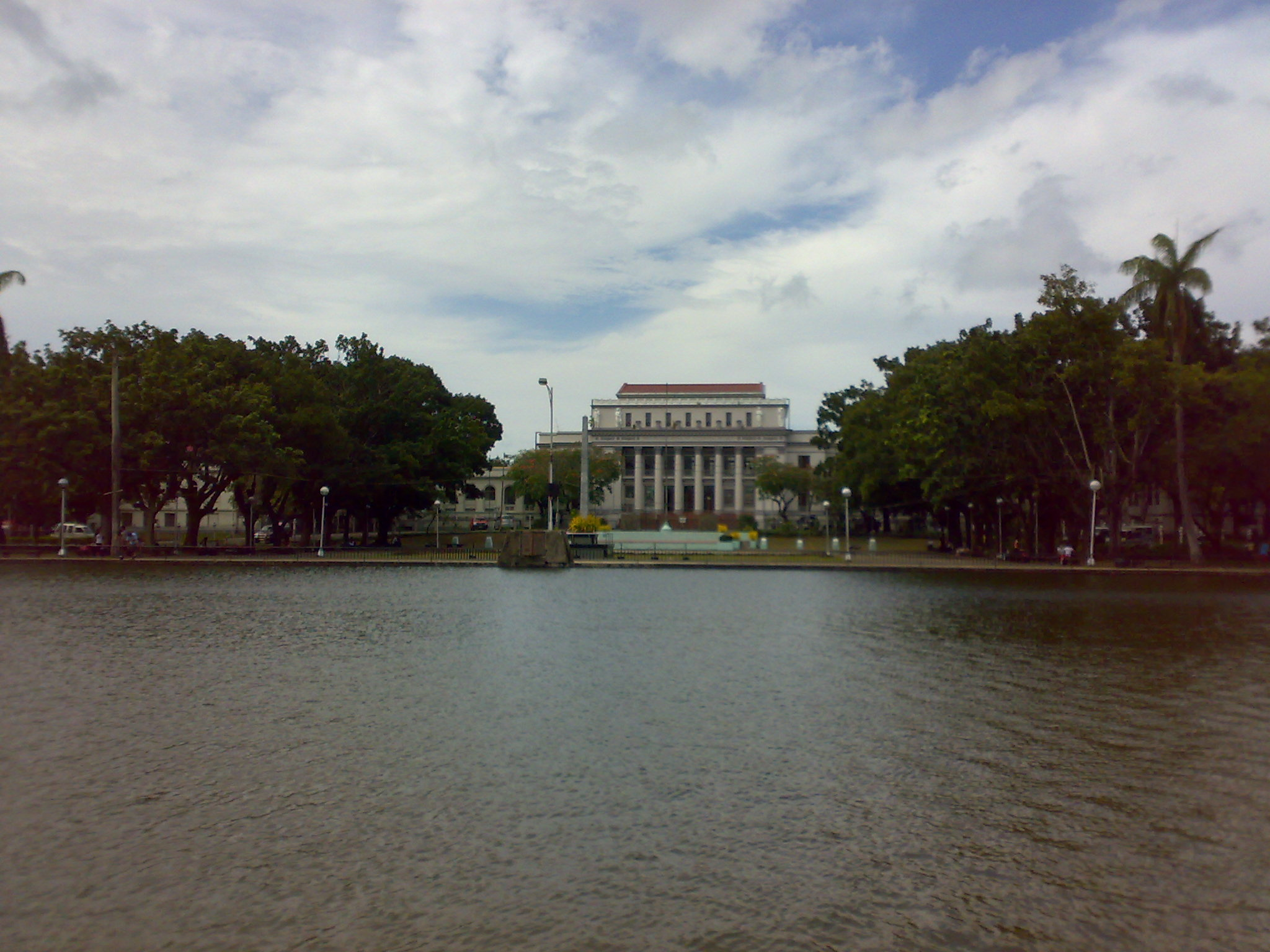
A view of the Capitol Park and Lagoon looking towards the Negros Occidental Provincial Capitol building

=== Spanish colonial period ===
Historical church accounts provide a glimpse of the early years of Bacolod as a mere small settlement by the riverbank known as Magsungay (translated as "horn-shaped" in English). When the neighboring settlement of Bago was elevated into the status of a small town in 1575, it had several religious dependencies and one of which was the village of Magsungay. The early missionaries placed the village under the care and protection of Saint Sebastian sometime in the middle of the 18th century. A corregidor (English: magistrate) by the name of Luis Fernando de Luna, donated a relic of the saint for the growing mission, and since then, the village came to be known as San Sebastián de Magsung̃ay.

Bacolod was not established as a town until 1755 or 1756, after the inhabitants of the coastal settlement of San Sebastián de Magsung̃ay, were attacked by Moro forces under Datu Bantílan of Sulu on July 14, 1755, and the villagers transferred from the coast to a hilly area called Bacólod (which is now the barangay of Granada). Bernardino de los Santos became the first gobernadorcillo (English: municipal judge or governor). The town of Bacolod was constituted as a parroquia (English: parish) in 1788 under the secular clergy, but did not have a resident priest until 1802, as the town was served by the priest from Bago, and later Binalbagan. By 1790, slave raids on Bacolod by Moro pirates had ceased.

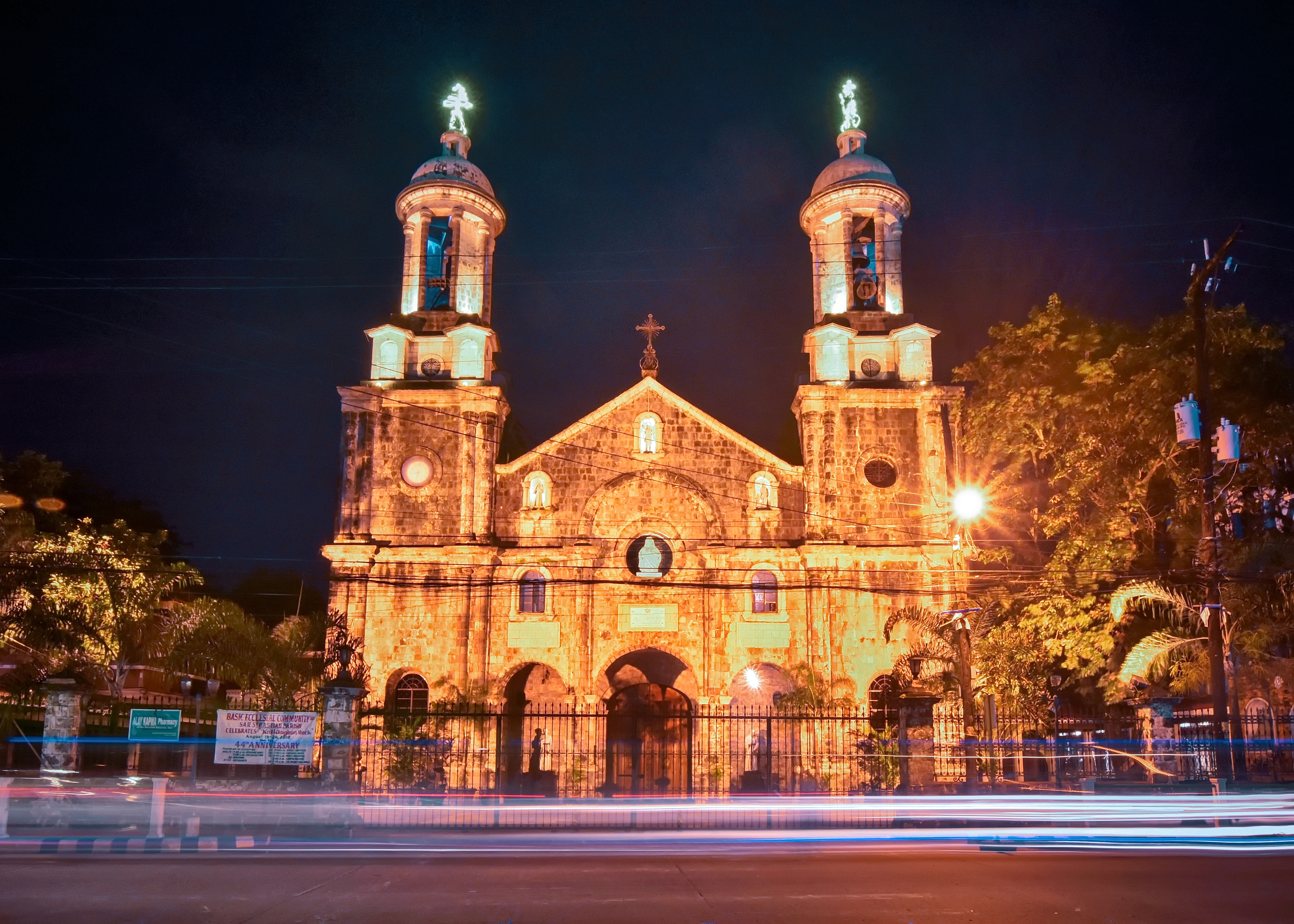
San Sebastian Cathedral at night

On February 11, 1802, Fr. Eusebio Laurencio became acting parish priest of Bacolod. In September 1806, Fr. León Pedro was appointed interim parish priest and the following year became the first regular parish priest. In September 1817, Fray (English: Friar) Julián Gonzaga from Barcelona was appointed as the parish priest. He encouraged the people to settle once again near the sea. He also encouraged migration to Bacolod and the opening of lands to agriculture and industry. By year 1818, a census by Fr. Felipe Bravo OSA revealed that Bacolod had 1,876 tributes amounting to 9,888 inhabitants. Of which, 37 were Spanish-Filipino tributes amounting to the same number of Spanish-Filipino families residing in the province.

In 1846, upon the request of Romualdo Jimeno, bishop of Cebu and Negros at that time, Governor-General Narciso Clavería y Zaldúa sent to Negros a team of Recollect missionaries headed by priest Fernando Cuenca. A decree of June 20, 1848, by Gobernador General Clavería ordered the restructuring of Negros politically and religiously. The following year (1849), Negros Island Gobernadorcillo Manuel Valdevieso y Morquecho transferred the capital of the Province of Negros from Himamaylan to Bacolod and the Augustinian Recollects were asked to assume spiritual administration of Negros, which they did that same year. Transfer of Bacolod to the Recollects, however, took place only in 1871. Fray Mauricio Ferrero became the first Augustinian Recollect parish priest of Bacolod and successor to the secular priest, Fr. Mariano Ávila. In 1863, a compulsory primary public school system was set up.

In 1889, Bacolod became the capital of Occidental Negros when the province of Negros was politically divided into the separate provinces of Occidental Negros (Spanish: Negros Occidental) and Oriental Negros (Spanish: Negros Oriental).

=== Revolution and Republic of Negros ===
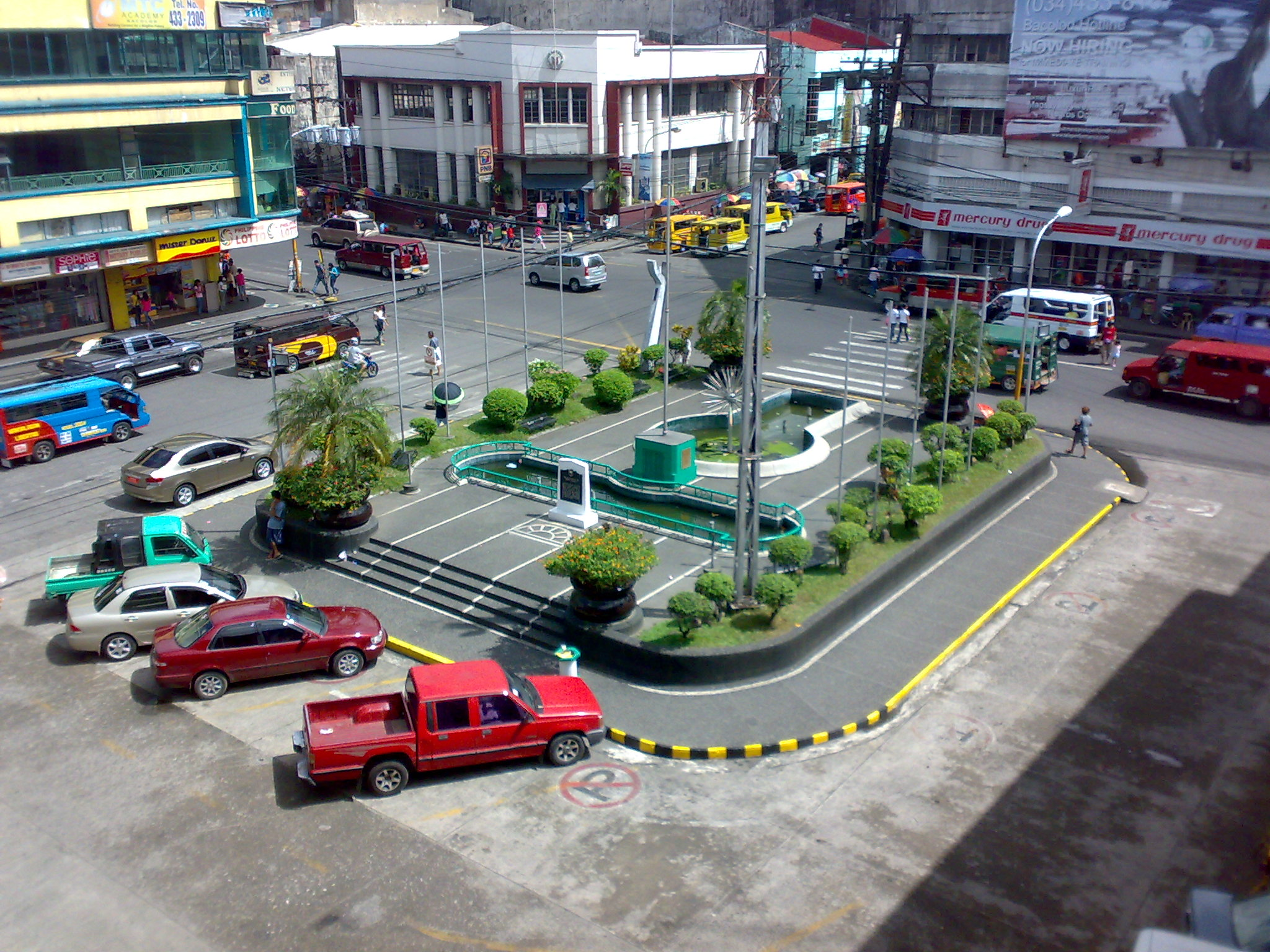
Fountain of Justice and the Bacolod Old City Hall, the site where the Spanish authorities surrender Bacolod to the forces of General Aniceto Lacson which took place on November 6, 1898, during the Negros Revolution.

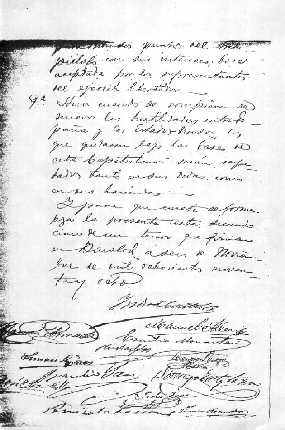
Last page of the Acta de Capitulación (English: Surrender Document).

The success of the uprising in Bacolod and environs was attributed to the low morale of the local imperial Spanish detachment, due to its defeat in Panay and Luzon and to the psychological warfare waged by Generals Aniceto Lacson and Juan Araneta. In 1897, a battle in Bacolod was fought at Matab-ang River. A year later, on November 5, 1898, the Negrense Revolucionarios (English: Negrense Revolutionary Army), armed with knives, bolos, spears, and rifle-like nipa palm stems, and pieces of sawali or amakan mounted on carts, captured the convent, presently Palacio Episcopal (English: Bishop's Palace), where Colonel Isidro de Castro y Cisneros, well-armed cazadores (English: hunters) and platoons of Guardias Civiles (English: Civil Guards), surrendered.

On November 7, 1898, most of the revolutionary army gathered together to establish a provisional junta and to confirm the elections of Aniceto Lacson as president, Juan Araneta as war-delegate, as well as the other officials. For a brief moment, the provinces of Occidental Negros and Oriental Negros were reunited under the cantonal government of the Negrense Revolucionarios, from November 6, 1898, to the end of February 1899, making Bacolod the capital. In March 1899, the American forces led by Colonel James G. Smith occupied Bacolod, the revolutionary capital of República Cantonal de Negros (English: Cantonal Republic of Negros). They occupied Bacolod after the invitation of the Republic of Negros which sought protectorate status for their nation under the United States.

=== American colonial period ===
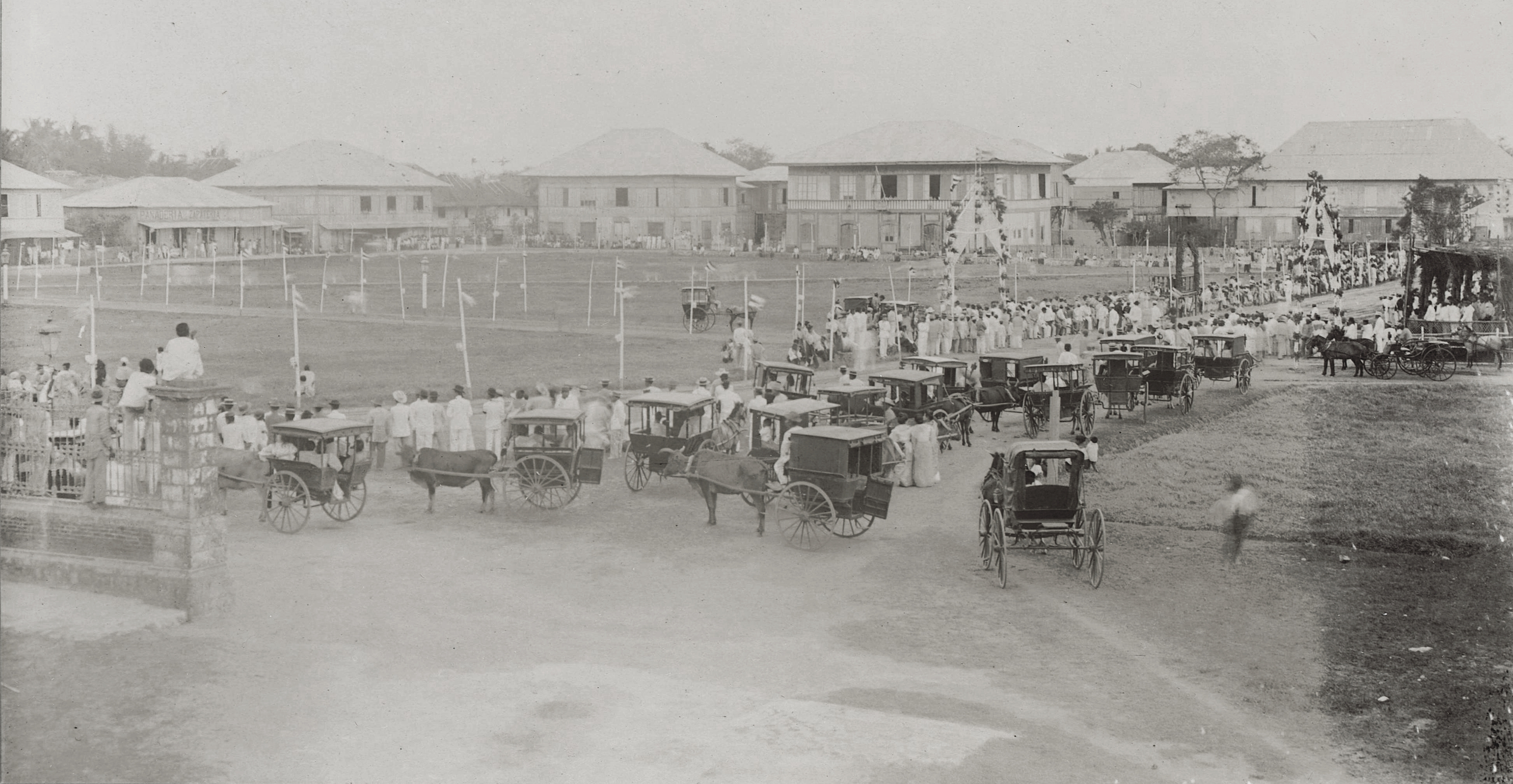
Bacolod Public Plaza during bicycle (kalesa) races in 1901

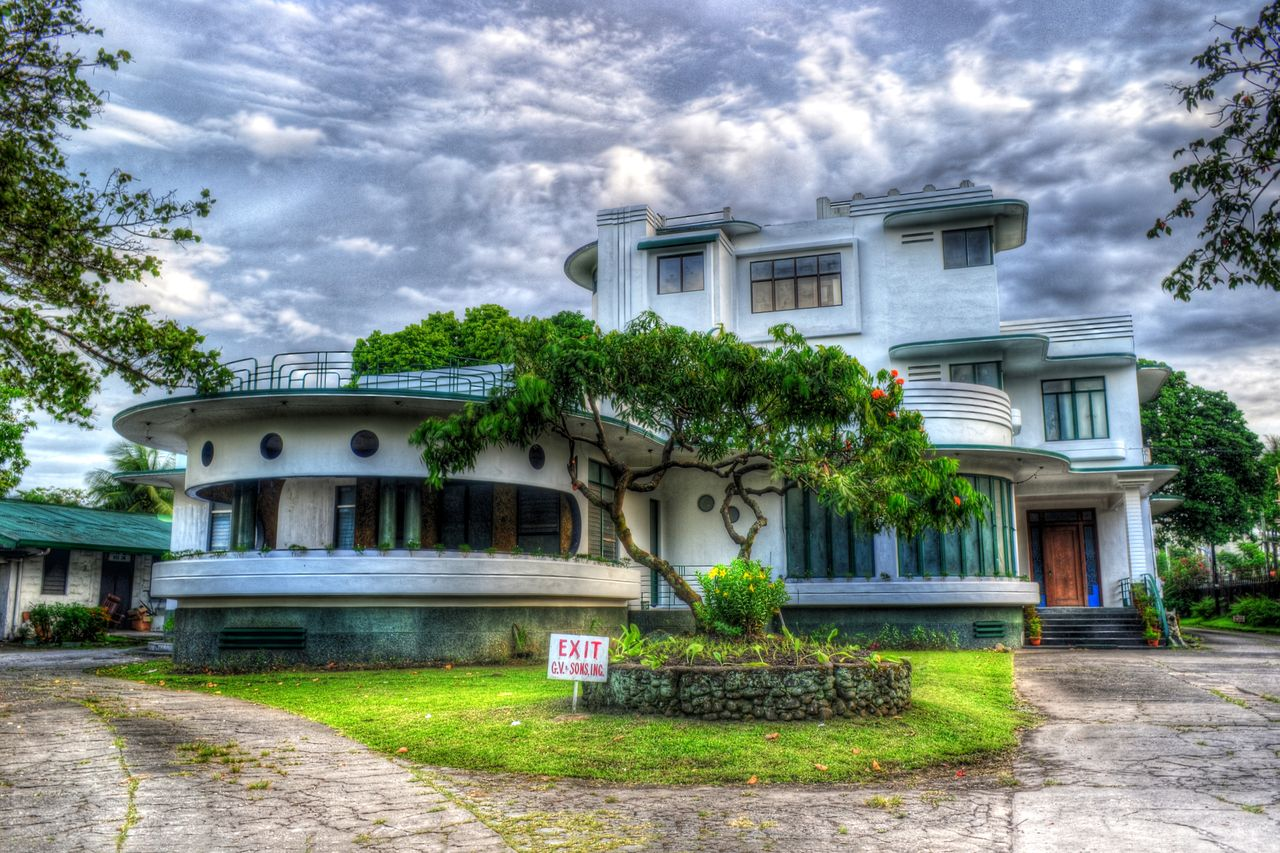
Ancestral home of then Don Generoso Villanueva, also known as the Daku Balay

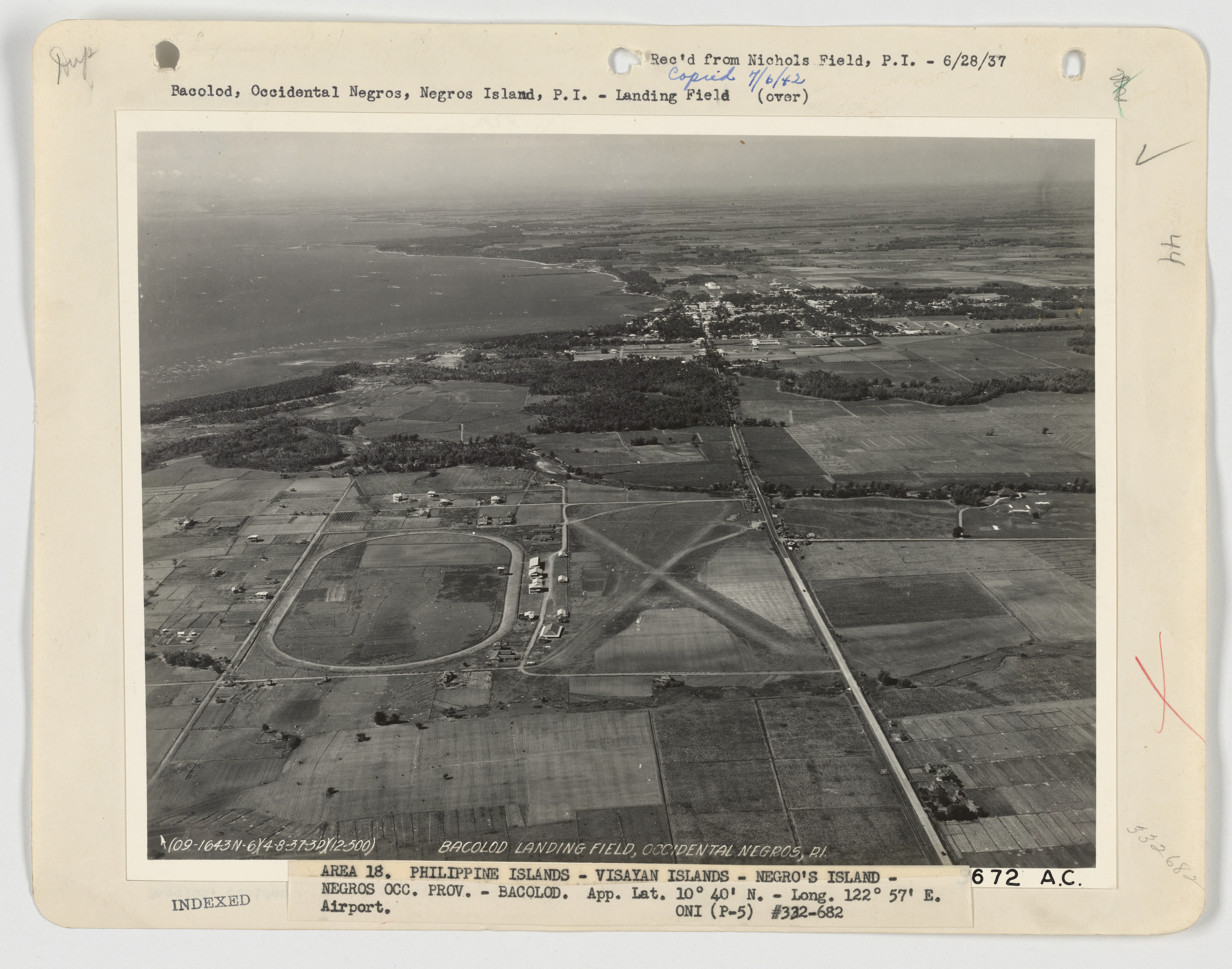
Aerial view of Bacolod, 1937

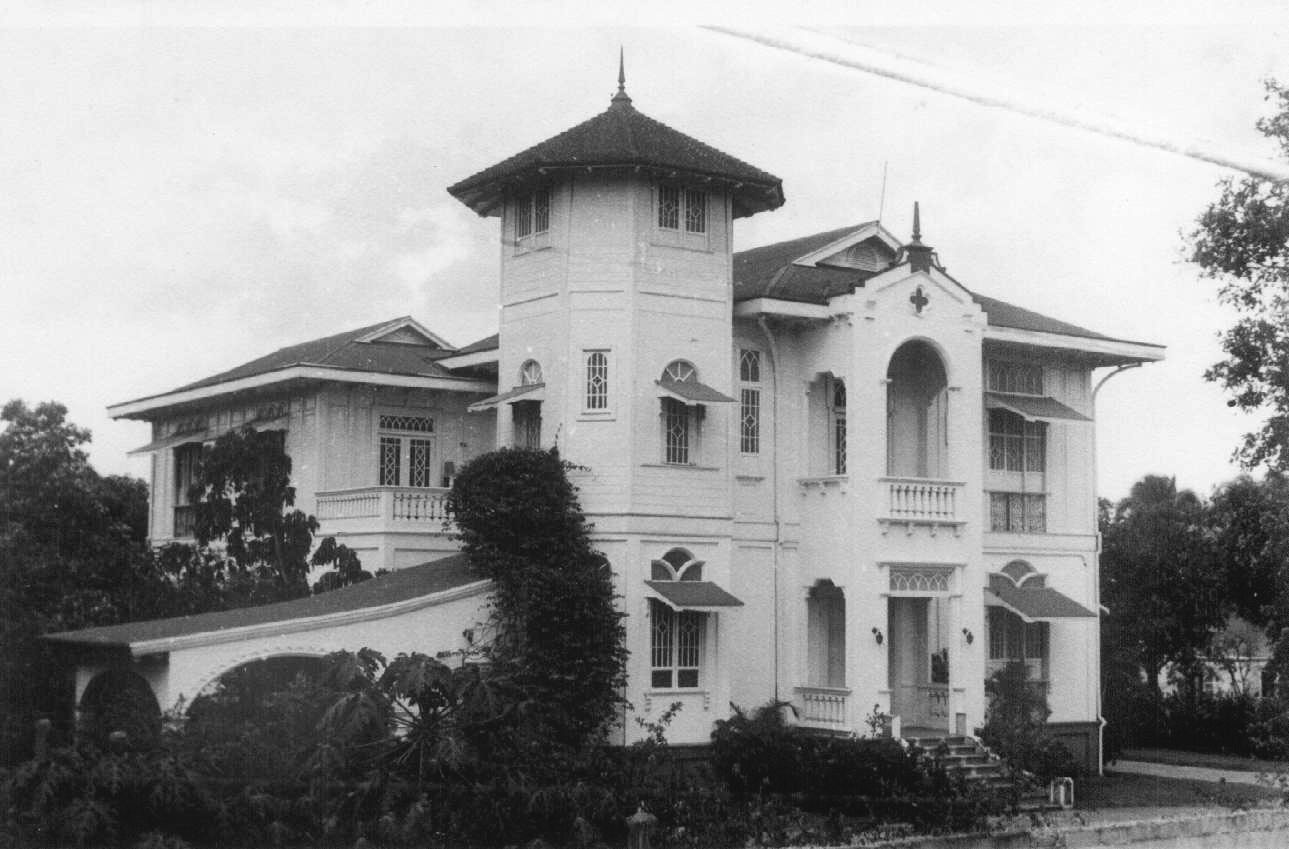
Home of then Don Mariano Ramos

The Cantonal Republic of Negros became a U.S. territory on April 30, 1901. This separated Negros Island once again, reverting Bacolod to its status as the capital of Occidental Negros.

The public school of Instituto Rizal (English: Rizal Institute) opened its doors to students on July 1, 1902. Colegio de Nuestra Señora de la Consolación (English: College of Our Lady of Consolation), the first private institution in the province of Negros Occidental, was established in Bacolod by the Augustinian sisters on March 11, 1919, and opened in July 1919. Soon, Bacolod welcomed a large number of immigrants from Spain, mainly Basques and Catalans, who became plantation owners.

A historic event took place in 1938 when Municipality of Bacolod was elevated into a city through Commonwealth Act No. 326 passed by the 1st National Assembly of the Philippines creating the City of Bacolod. Assemblyman Pedro C. Hernáez of the second district of Negros Occidental sponsored the bill. The law was passed on June 18, 1938. Bacolod was formally inaugurated as a chartered city on October 19, 1938, by virtue of Commonwealth Act No. 404, emphasised by the visit of Commonwealth President Manuel L. Quezon. President Quezon appointed Alfredo Montelíbano, Sr. as the first city mayor of Bacolod.

=== Japanese occupation and allied liberation ===
In World War II, Bacolod was occupied by the Japanese forces on May 21, 1942. Lieutenant General Kawano "Kono" Takeshi, the Japanese commanding officer of the 77th Infantry Brigade, 102nd Division, seized the homes of Don Generoso Villanueva, a prominent sugar planter—whose home, the Daku Balay served as the "seat of power" (occupational headquarters for the Japanese Forces in Negros and all of the Central Visayan region of the Philippines) and being the tallest building of Bacolod it served as the city's watchtower—and the home of his brother-in-law, Don Mariano Ramos, the first appointed Municipal President of Bacolod. The home of Don Generoso was lived in by Lt. General Takeshi throughout the duration of the war and also served as his office and the home of Don Mariano was occupied by a Japanese Colonel serving under the command of Lt. General Takeshi. The city was liberated by joint Philippine and American forces on May 29, 1945. It took time to rebuild the city after liberation. However, upon the orders of Lt. General Takeshi, both the homes of Villanueva and Ramos were saved from destruction by the retreating Japanese forces.

In March 1945, upon the invasion of the American and Philippine Commonwealth forces, the withdrawal of the Japanese army into the mountains and the temporary occupation of Bacolod by the combined U.S. and Philippine Commonwealth armed forces, the house of Villanueva was then occupied by Major General Rapp Brush, commander of the 40th Infantry Division, known as the "Sun Burst" Division, for approximately five months. The local Philippine military built and established the general headquarters and camp bases of the Philippine Commonwealth Army which was active from January 3, 1942, to June 30, 1946. The 7th Constabulary Regiment of the Philippine Constabulary was also active from October 28, 1944, to June 30, 1946, and was stationed in Bacolod during and after World War II.

=== Independent Philippines ===
When the country finally gained independence from the United States, the city's public markets and slaughterhouses were rebuilt during the administration of then Mayor Vicente Remitió from 1947 to 1949. In 1948, a fire razed a portion of the records section of the old city hall that consumed the rear end of the building and with it, numerous priceless documents of the city.

Bacolod was classified as a highly urbanized city on September 27, 1984, by the provision of Section 166 and 168 of the Local Government Code and the DILG Memo Circular No. 83-49.

In January 1985, the original hardwood and coral structure of Palacio Episcopal was almost entirely destroyed by a fire. Among the damage of the raging fire were items of significant historical value. The reconstruction of Palacio which took more than two years, was completed in 1990.

In 2008, Bacolod topped a survey by MoneySense Magazine as the "Best Place to Live in the Philippines". The city has also been declared by the Department of Science and Technology as a "center of excellence" for information technology and business process management operations. In 2017 & 2019, Bacolod was awarded the "Top Philippine Model City" as the most livable urban center in the country by The Manila Times. In 2021, Bacolod received the "2021 Most Business-Friendly Local Government Unit (LGU) Award" under the category of highly urbanized cities outside the National Capital Region (NCR) in the search organized by the Philippine Chamber of Commerce and Industry (PCCI). This was the second time Bacolod received such award having won the same title in 2007.

== Geography ==
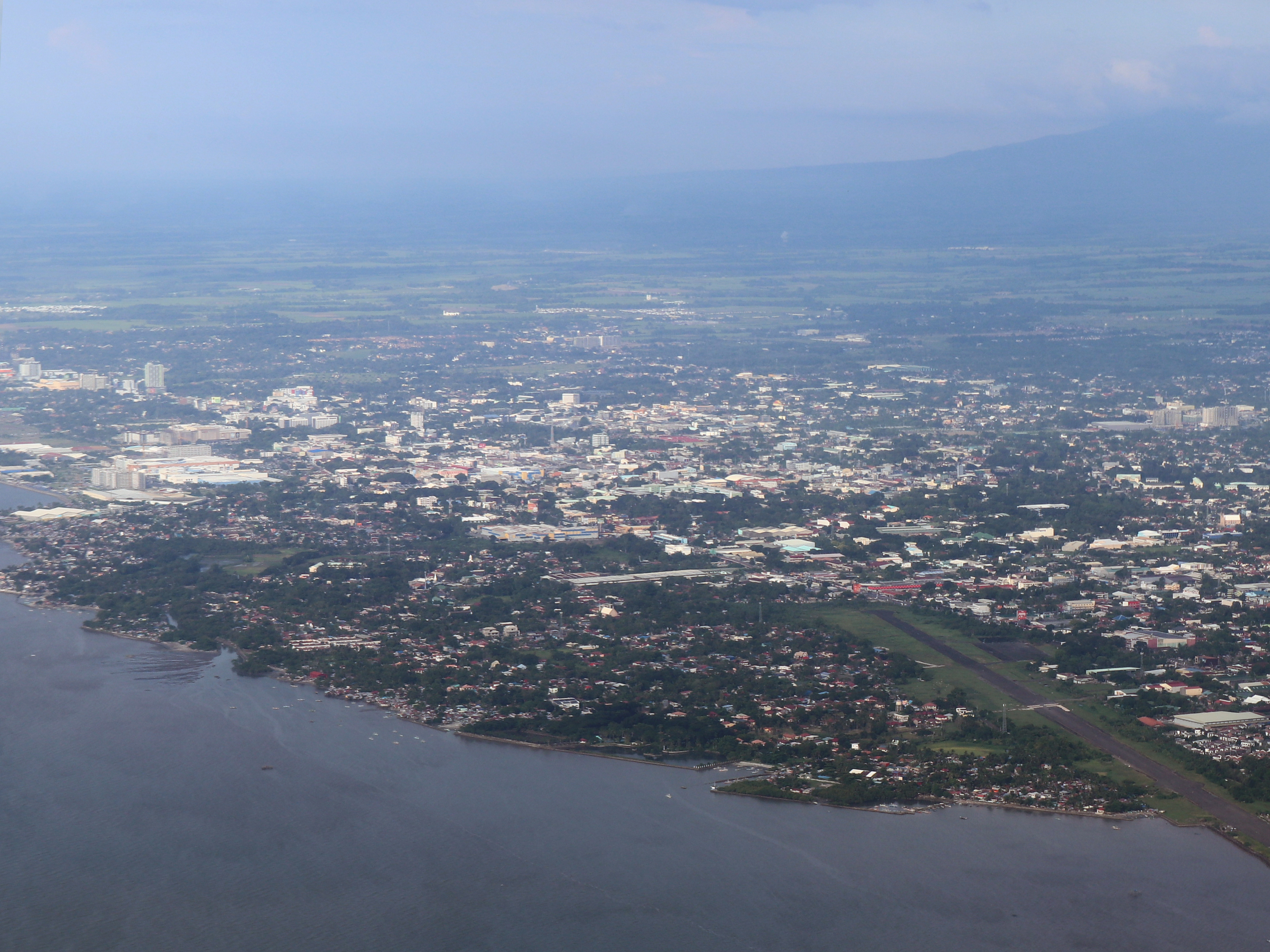
Bacolod aerial view, 2023

Bacolod is located on the northwestern coast of the large island of Negros. Within the island, it is bounded on the north by the city of Talisay, on the east by the town of Murcia and on the south by the city of Bago. As a coastal city, it is bounded on the west by the Guimaras Strait, serving as a natural border of northwestern Negros Island Region to the neighboring Western Visayas. The global location of Bacolod is 10 degrees, 40 minutes 40 seconds - north and 122 degrees 54 minutes 25 seconds - east with Bacolod Public Plaza as the benchmark.

Skyline of Lacson Street, one of the major streets in the city

Bacolod has a total land area of 16,267 hectares (162.67 km^{2}; 62.81 sq mi), including straits and bodies of water and the 124 hectares (310 acres) reclamation area; and is composed of 61 barangay (villages) and 639 purok (smaller units composing a barangay/village). It is accessible by sea through the ports of Banago; the BREDCO Port in the Reclamation Area, and the port of Pulupandan. By air, it is accessible through the Bacolod–Silay International Airport, which is approximately 13 (four is counting from the Lagoon) kilometers away from the center of the city.

Bacolod is ideally located on a level area, slightly sloping down as it extends toward the sea with an average slope of 0.9 percent for the city proper and between 3 and 5 percent for the suburbs. The altitude is 32.8 feet or 10.0 metres above sea level, with the Bacolod City Public Plaza as the benchmark.

=== Climate ===
Bacolod has a tropical monsoon climate (Köppen Am) with two pronounced seasons, wet and dry. The rainy (wet) season starts from May to December with heavy rains occurring during August and September. The dry season starts from January until the last week of April.

Climate data for Bacolod
Month	Jan	Feb	Mar	Apr	May	Jun	Jul	Aug	Sep	Oct	Nov	Dec	Year
Mean daily maximum °C (°F)	31 (88)	31 (88)	32 (90)	34 (93)	33 (91)	32 (90)	31 (88)	31 (88)	31 (88)	31 (88)	32 (90)	31 (88)	32 (89)
Mean daily minimum °C (°F)	23 (73)	23 (73)	24 (75)	25 (77)	25 (77)	25 (77)	24 (75)	24 (75)	24 (75)	24 (75)	24 (75)	24 (75)	24 (75)
Average rainfall mm (inches)	39 (1.5)	37 (1.5)	38 (1.5)	57 (2.2)	156 (6.1)	237 (9.3)	376 (14.8)	338 (13.3)	250 (9.8)	191 (7.5)	134 (5.3)	114 (4.5)	1,967 (77.4)
Source 1: worldweatheronline.com
Source 2: www.myweather2.com

=== Barangays ===
Bacolod is politically subdivided into 61 barangays. Each barangay consists of puroks and some have sitios.

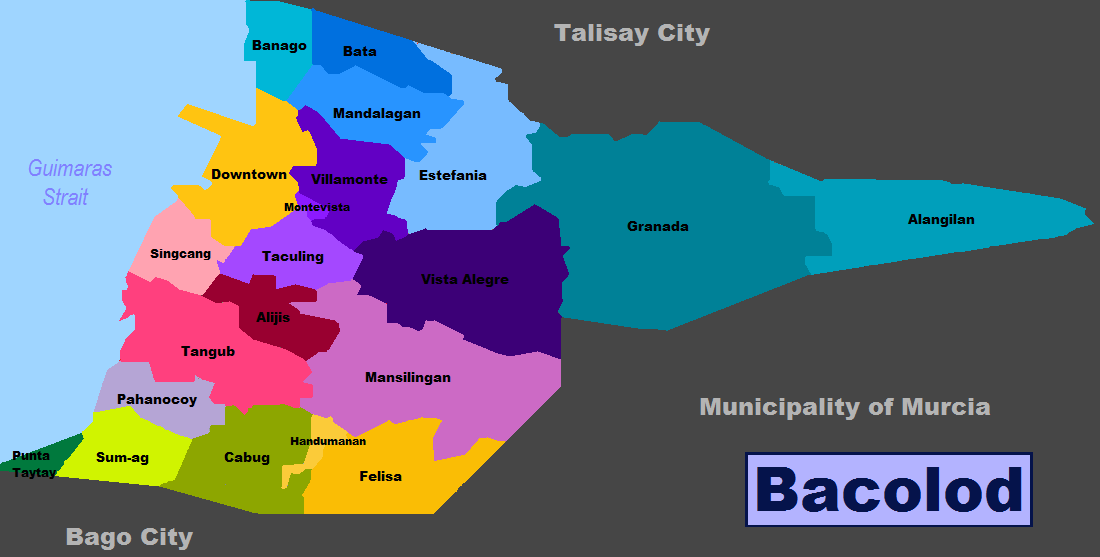
District map of Bacolod

- Barangay 1 (Poblacion)
- Barangay 2 (Población)
- Barangay 3 (Población)
- Barangay 4 (Población)
- Barangay 5 (Población)
- Barangay 6 (Población)
- Barangay 7 (Población)
- Barangay 8 (Población)
- Barangay 9 (Población)
- Barangay 10 (Población)
- Barangay 11 (Población)
- Barangay 12 (Población)
- Barangay 13 (Población)
- Barangay 14 (Población)
- Barangay 15 (Población)
- Barangay 16 (Población)
- Barangay 17 (Población)
- Barangay 18 (Población)
- Barangay 19 (Población)
- Barangay 20 (Población)
- Barangay 21 (Población)
- Barangay 22 (Población)
- Barangay 23 (Población)
- Barangay 24 (Población)
- Barangay 25 (Población)
- Barangay 26 (Población)
- Barangay 27 (Población)
- Barangay 28 (Población)
- Barangay 29 (Población)
- Barangay 30 (Población)
- Barangay 31 (Población)
- Barangay 32 (Población)
- Barangay 33 (Población)
- Barangay 34 (Población)
- Barangay 35 (Población)
- Barangay 36 (Población)
- Barangay 37 (Población)
- Barangay 38 (Población)
- Barangay 39 (Población)
- Barangay 40 (Población)
- Barangay 41 (Población)
- Alangilan
- Alijis
- Banago
- Bata
- Cabug
- Estefanía
- Felisa
- Granada
- Handumanan
- Mandalagan
- Mansilingan
- Montevista
- Pahanocoy
- Punta Taytay
- Singcang-Airport
- Sum-ag
- Taculing
- Tangub
- Villamonte
- Vista Alegre

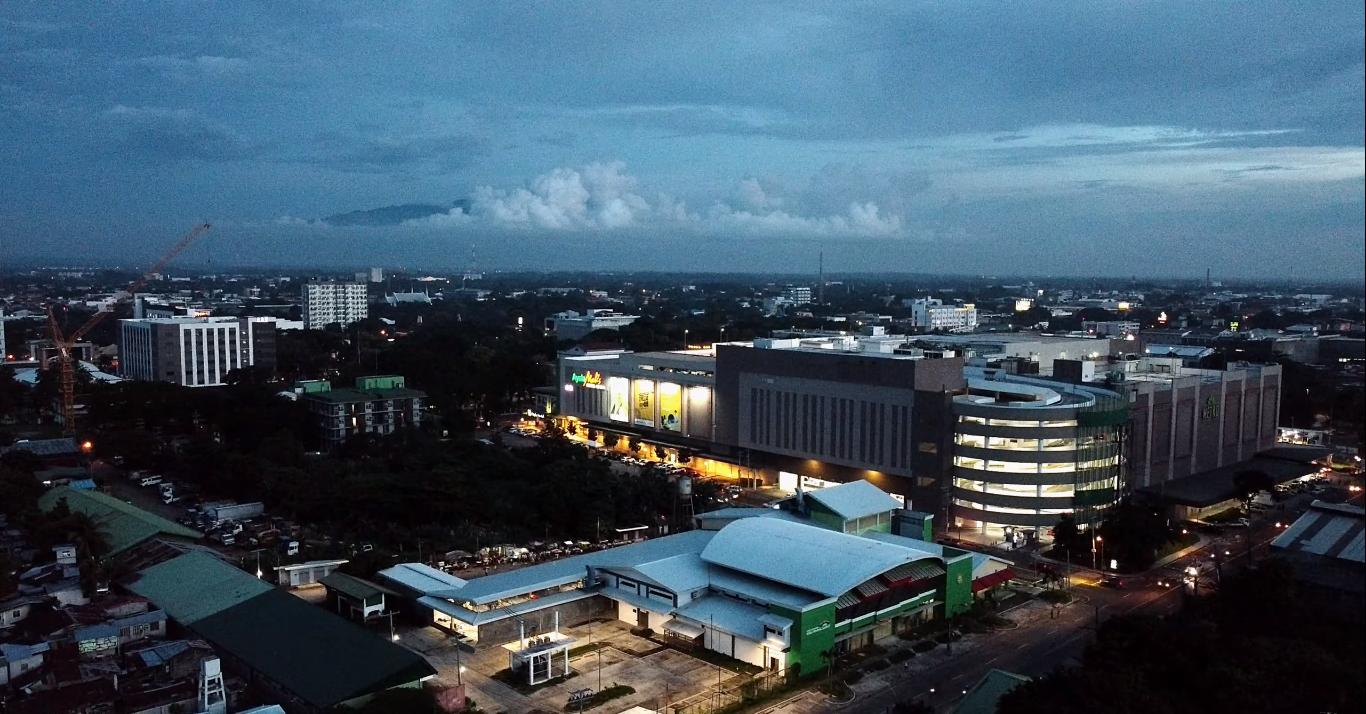
Panorama of Bacolod with Ayala Malls Capitol Central in the background

== Demographics ==
Population census of Bacolod
Year	Pop.	±% p.a.
1903	15,983	—
1918	19,424	+1.31%
1939	57,474	+5.30%
1948	101,432	+6.52%
1960	119,315	+1.36%
1970	187,300	+4.61%
1975	223,392	+3.60%
1980	262,415	+3.27%
1990	364,180	+3.33%
1995	402,345	+1.88%
2000	429,076	+1.39%
2007	499,497	+2.12%
2010	511,820	+0.89%
2015	561,875	+1.79%
2020	600,783	+1.42%
2024	624,787	+0.94%
Source: Philippine Statistics Authority

The Bacolod City (New) Government Center

In the 2024 census, Bacolod has a total population of 624,787 people, and its registered voting population is 312,816 voters (2019). Bacolod is the largest city in the Negros Island Region in terms of population.

== Economy ==
Poverty incidence of Bacolod (%)

Source: Philippine Statistics Authority

Negros First CyberCentre IT and BPO Hub

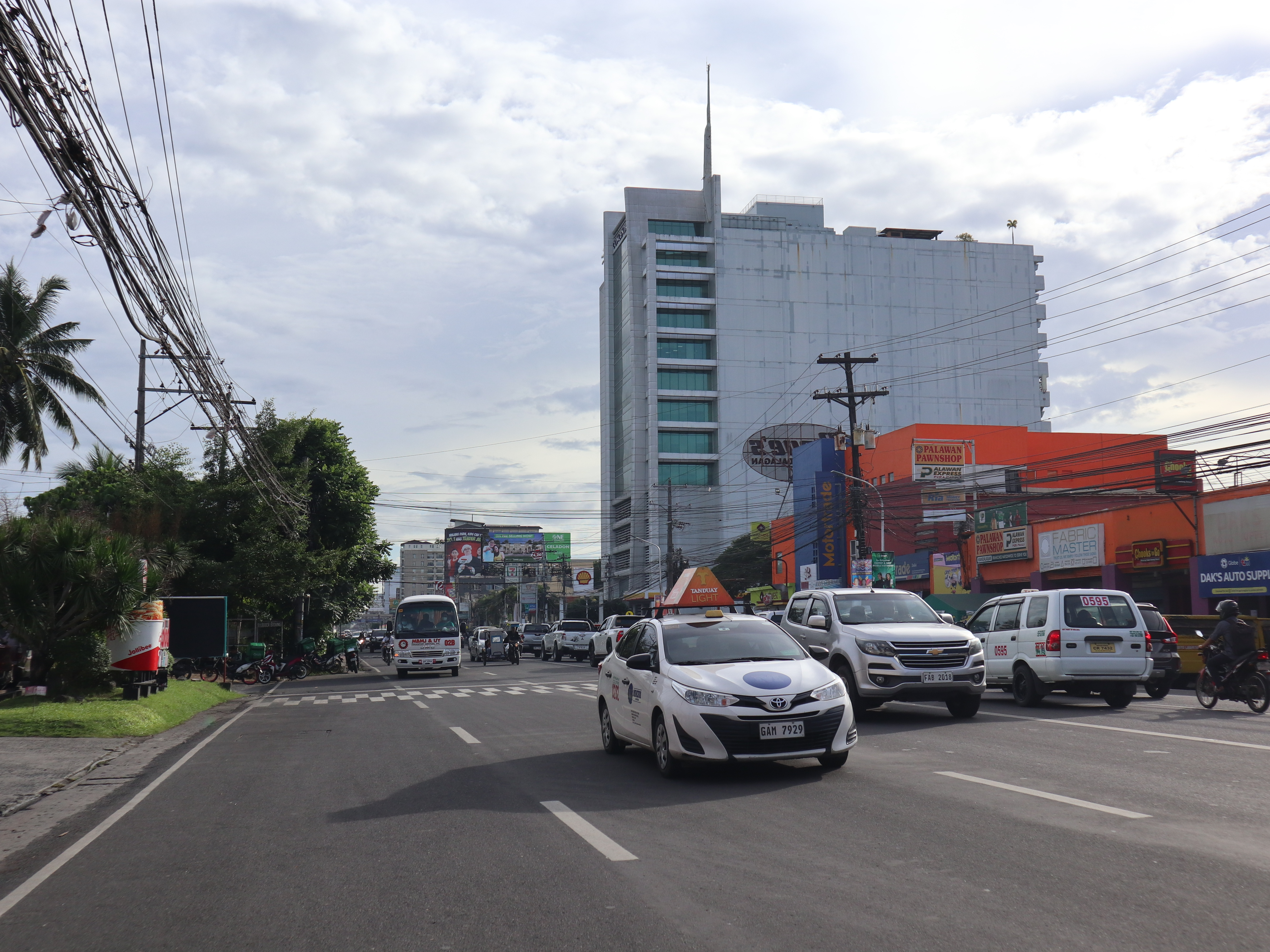
Concentrix Bacolod

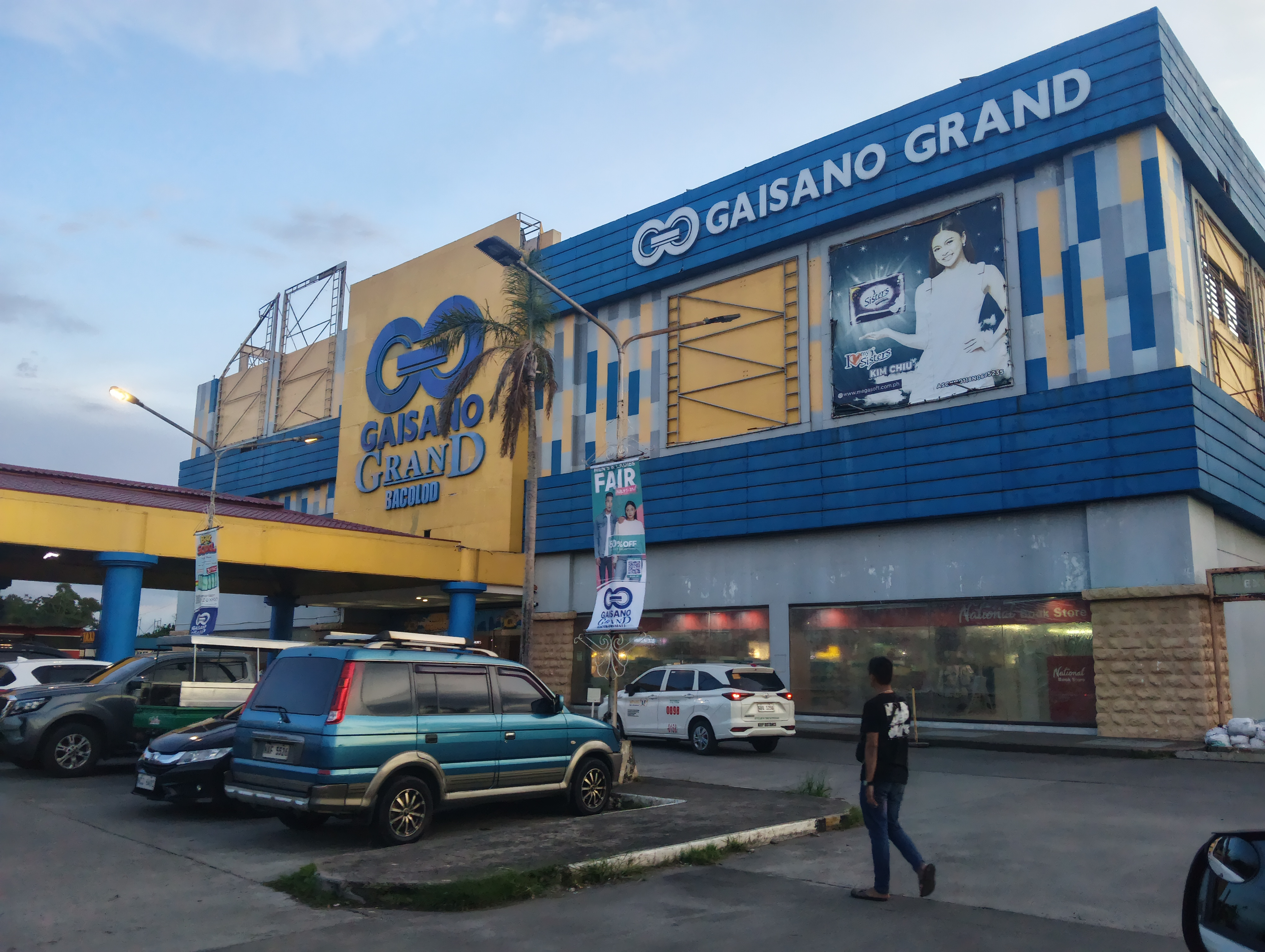
Gaisano Grand Bacolod Mall

SM City Bacolod

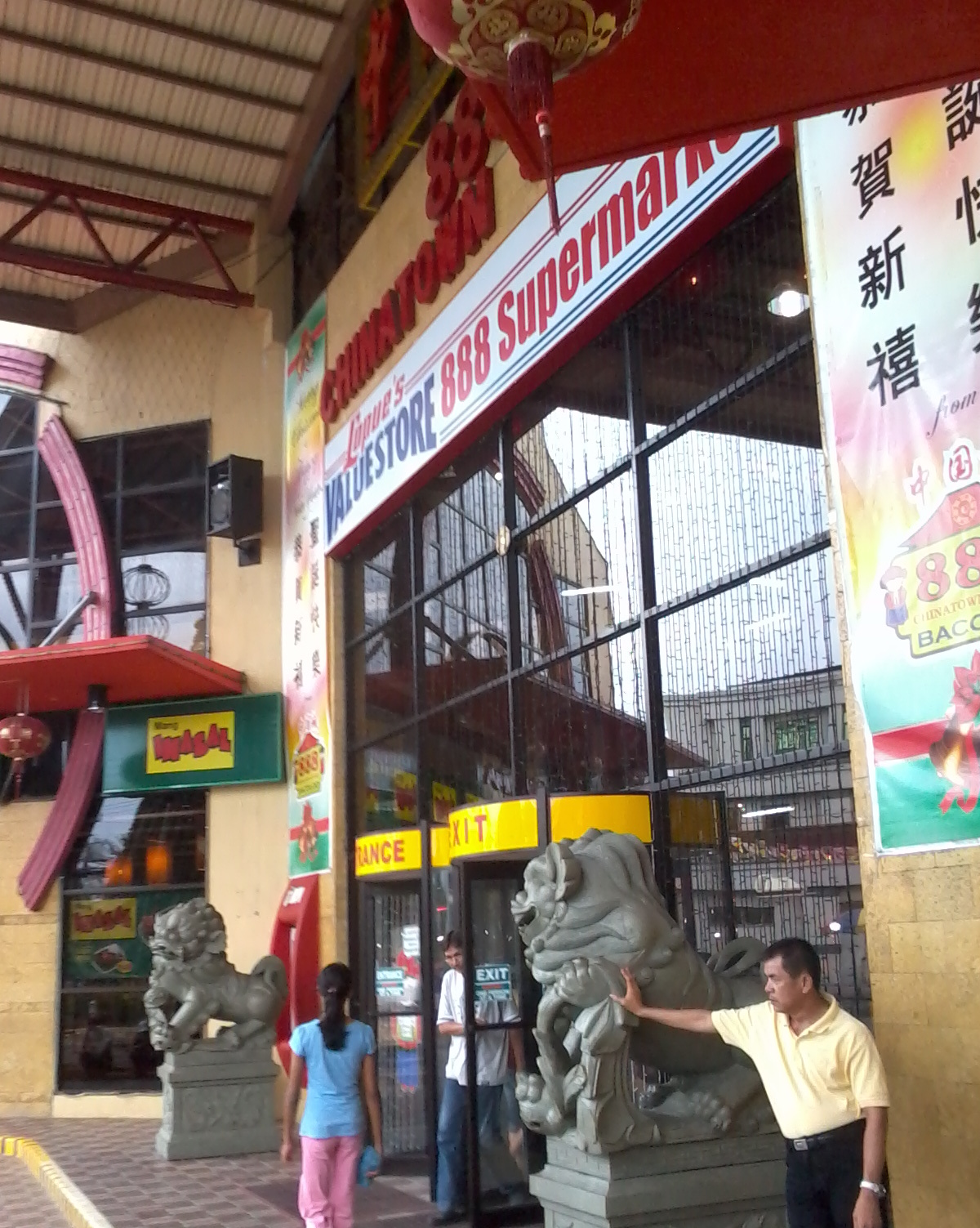
888 Chinatown Square Premier Mall of Bacolod

Bacolod is the Philippines' third fastest growing economy in terms of information technology (IT) and business process outsourcing (BPO) activities. The city has been recommended by the Information and Communication Technology Office of the Department of Science and Technology (DOST) and Business Processing Association of the Philippines (BPAP) as the best location in the Visayas for BPO activities. Bacolod ranked 3rd among the top ten "Next Wave Cities" of the Philippines for the best location for BPO and offshoring according to a 2010 report of the Commission on Information and Communications Technology. In 2013, the city was declared a "center of excellence" for IT-business process management operations by the DOST, joining the ranks of Metro Manila, Metro Cebu and Clark Freeport Zone.

Among the notable BPO and KPO companies operating in the city are Concentrix, Teleperformance, TTEC, iQor, Transcom, Ubiquity Global Services, Panasiatic Solutions, Focus Direct Inc. – Bacolod, Pierre and Paul Solutions Inc., TELESYNERGY Corp. – Bacolod, Hit Rate Solutions/Next Level IT Teleservices Inc., Focusinc Group Corporation (FGC Plus), Pathcutters Philippines Inc., TeleQuest Voice Services (TQVS), ServiceFirst Call Center and BPO, Fair Trade Outsourcing, Global Strategic Business Process Solutions, Monster Group Bacolod, Orbit Teleservices, VISAYA KPO Bacolod, and iReply Back Office Services.

In 2012, a two-hectare (4.9-acre) portion of the four-hectare (9.9-acre) Paglaum Sports Complex was partitioned for the construction of the provincial government-owned Negros First CyberCentre (NFCC) as an IT-BPO Outsourcing Hub with a budget of P674-million. It is located at Lacson corner Hernaez Streets and offers up to 22,000 square meters of mixed IT-BPO and commercial spaces. Its facilities are divided into three sections — Information Technology, Commercial Support Facilities, and Common IT Facilities. It was inaugurated in April 2015 in rites led by President Benigno S. Aquino III. The area was initially a residential zone and has been reclassified as a commercial zone as approved by the Comprehensive Zoning Ordinance.

Along its highways, sugarcane plantations are a typical scene. As of 2003, 7,216 hectares (17,830 acres) of the city's 8,560 hectares (21,200 acres) of agricultural land were still planted with sugarcane. Meanwhile, 915 hectares (2,260 acres) were devoted to rice, 120 hectares (300 acres) to assorted vegetables, 100 hectares (250 acres) to coconut, 43 hectares (110 acres) to banana and 34 hectares (84 acres) to corn.

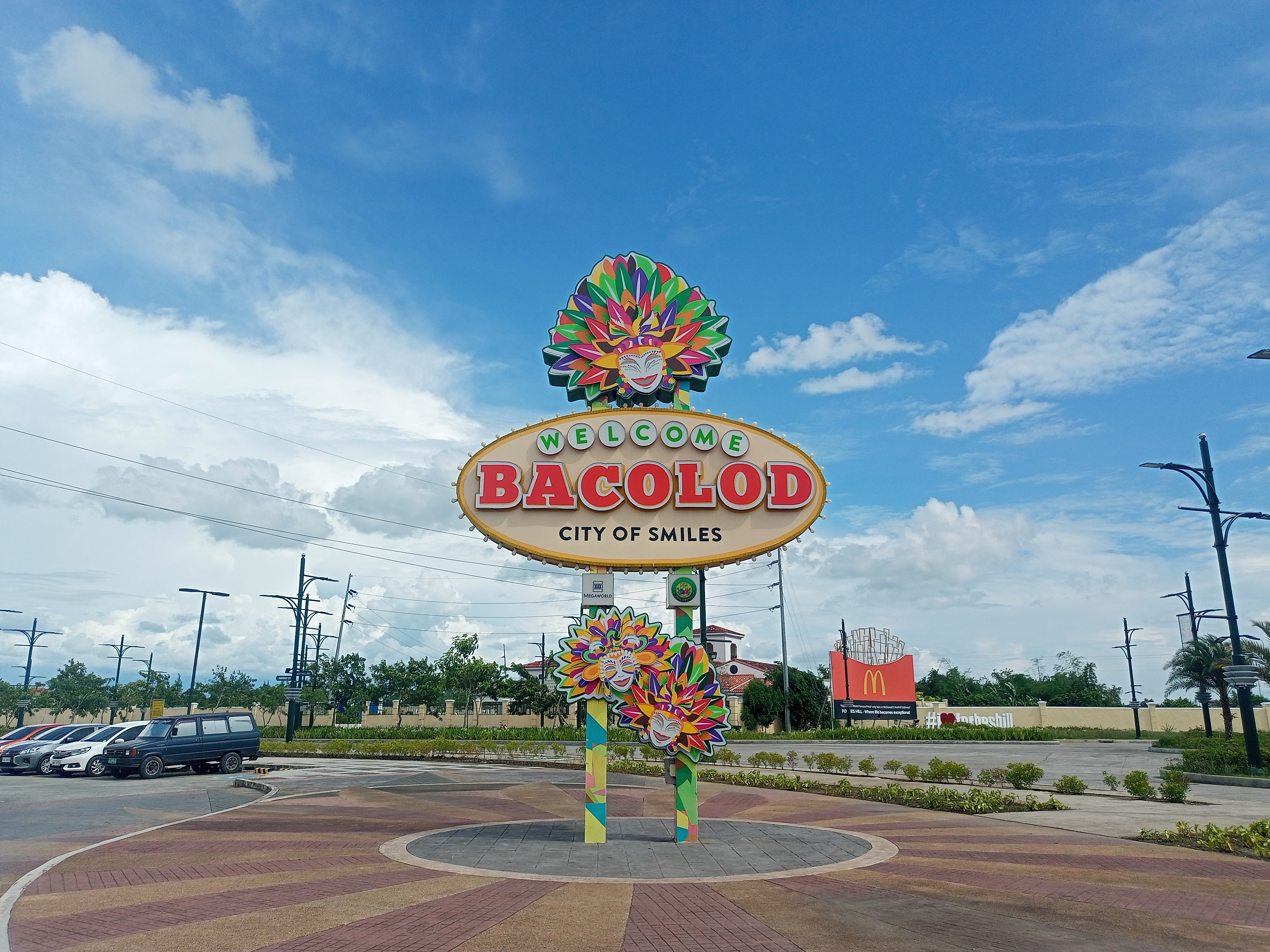
Welcome marker in Bacolod near Forbes Hill by Megaworld

According to the "Philippine Cities Competitiveness Ranking Project 2005" of Asian Institute of Management (AIM), Bacolod tops the list in terms of infrastructure, ahead of such other mid-size cities like Iligan, Calamba and General Santos. The city also tops the list in terms of quality of life, ahead of such other mid-size cities like San Fernando, Baguio, Iloilo and Lipa. AIM also recognized Bacolod as one of the Top Five most competitive mid-size cities together with Batangas, Iligan, Iloilo, and San Fernando.

In 2022, President Bongbong Marcos unveiled Megaworld Corporation's plan to build a 34-hectare mixed-use development called Megaworld Upper East. The project is said to generate over 500,000 direct and indirect jobs in the province of Negros Occidental, 100,000 of which are BPO employees.

== Sports ==
=== Football ===
Bacolod hosted the 2005 Southeast Asian Games Football tournament, the 2007 ASEAN Football Championship qualification, the 2010 AFC U-16 Championship qualification and the 2012 AFC Challenge Cup qualification play-off first leg was held at the Panaad Stadium where the Philippines won 2–0 over Mongolia. Likewise the city has the home football stadium of the Philippines national football team (Azkals).

The Philippines Football League side Ceres–Negros F.C. is based in the city, playing their home games at the newly renovated Panaad Stadium. Ceres-Negros FC is the Philippines Football League 2018 Champion.

Since Bacolod is also being tagged as a "Football City" in the country, an ordinance was approved by the City Council in June 2015, setting the third week of the month of April every year as the "Bacolod City Football Festival Week".

Bacolod will have a training center constructed by FIFA.

=== Basketball ===
Exterior of the La Salle Coliseum

Bacolod is home to two professional basketball teams, both in the Maharlika Pilipinas Basketball League, with the Bacolod City of Smiles and Negros Muscovados both playing their home games at La Salle Coliseum. It is also the former home of the Negros Slashers of the defunct Metropolitan Basketball Association.

The 2008 and 2024 PBA All-Star Weekend was held in the city and has since been a regular venue of the Philippine Basketball Association's out-of-town games. The Sandugo Unigames 2012 was also hosted by the city participated by various universities across the country. to The Greg Gasataya Basketball (GGBL) League is the most prominent and prestigious inter-barangay basketball league of the city since 2017 to the present.

The 2026 FIBA U18 Women’s Asia Cup SEABA Qualifiers was held in the STI West Negros University Gym and it is the city's first time to host an international basketball game.

=== Karate ===
The 1996 Philippine Karatedo Federation (PKF) National Championships and the 20th PKF National Open 2007 were held in the city. Both events were hosted by La Salle Coliseum of the University of St. La Salle. The tournaments were contested by hundreds of karatekas all over the country.

=== Golf ===
There are two major golf courses in the city: the Bacolod Golf and Country Club and the Negros Occidental Golf and Country Club. The city hosted the 61st Philippine Airlines Inter-club Golf Tournament and the 2008 Philippine Amateur Golf Championship. A Golf tournament sponsored by the City Mayor is also held every Masskara.

=== Mixed martial arts ===
Bacolod is home to many mixed martial arts competitions including quarterly fights hosted by the Universal Reality Combat Championship.

=== Parkour ===
The first Parkour team in Negros, known as "Parkour Bacolod", started in late 2007.

== Culture ==
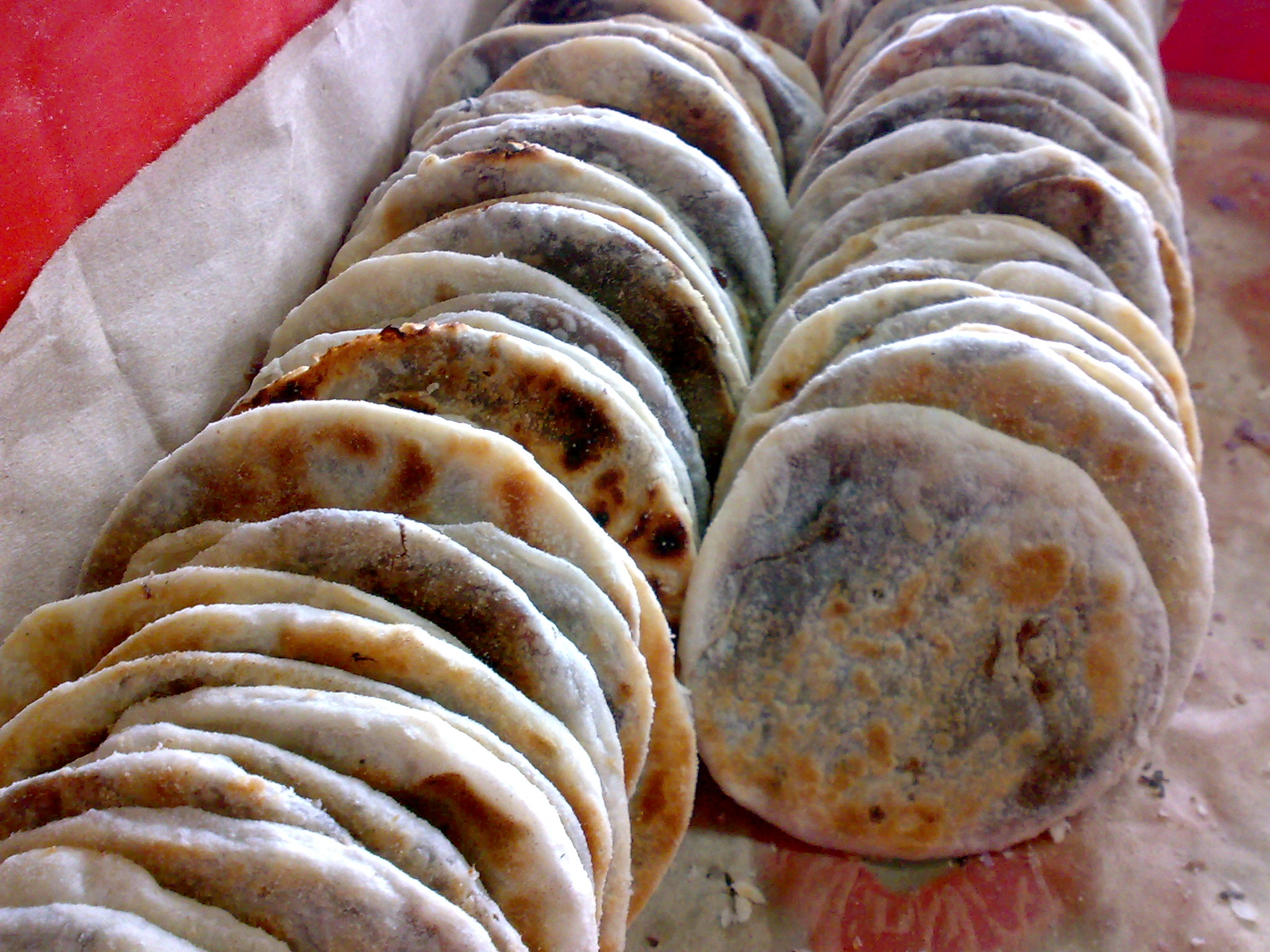
Piaya, a muscovado-filled flatbread, is a common delicacy in Bacolod.

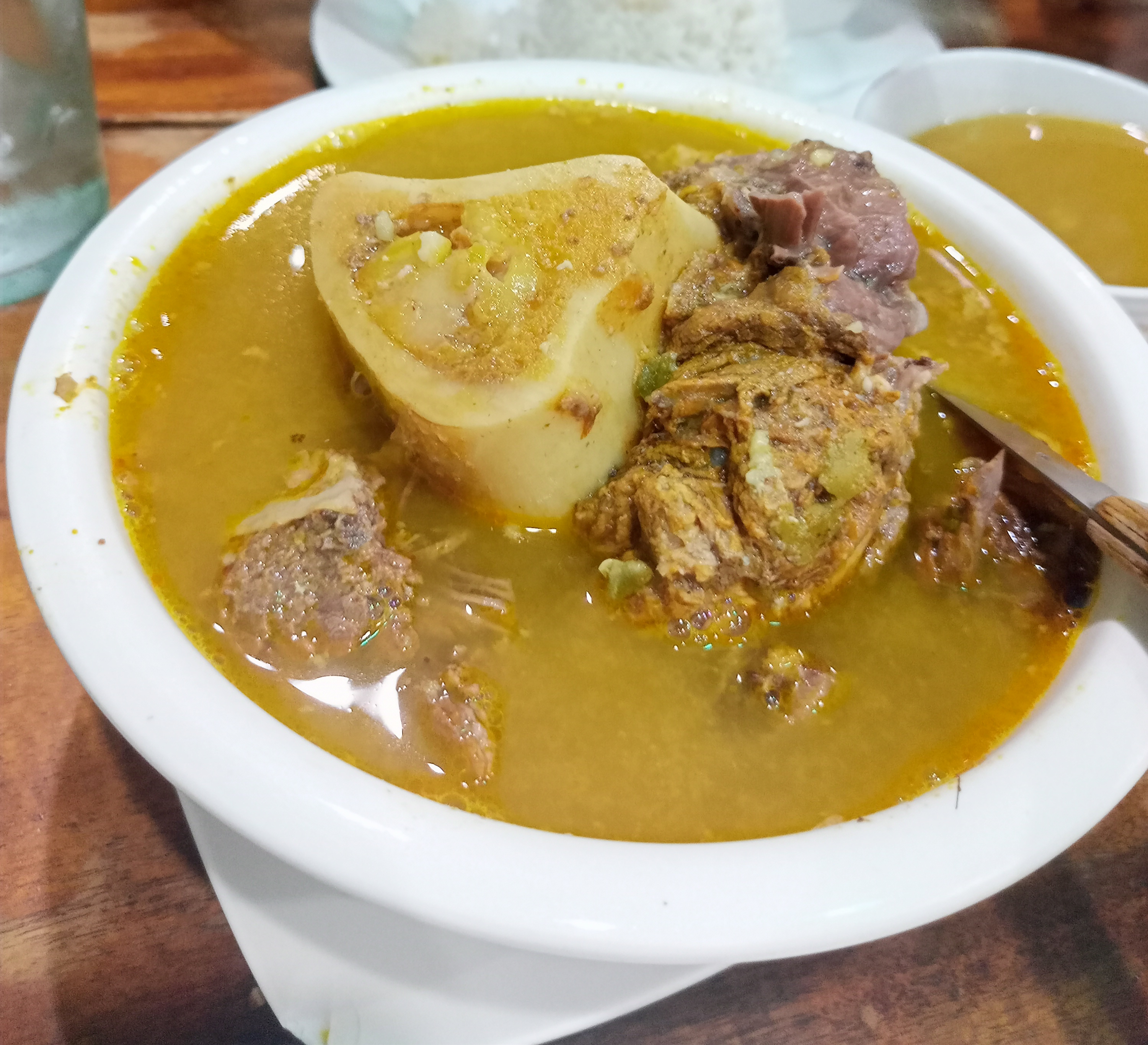
A bowl of cansi, a beef shank and marrow soup originated in Bacolod.

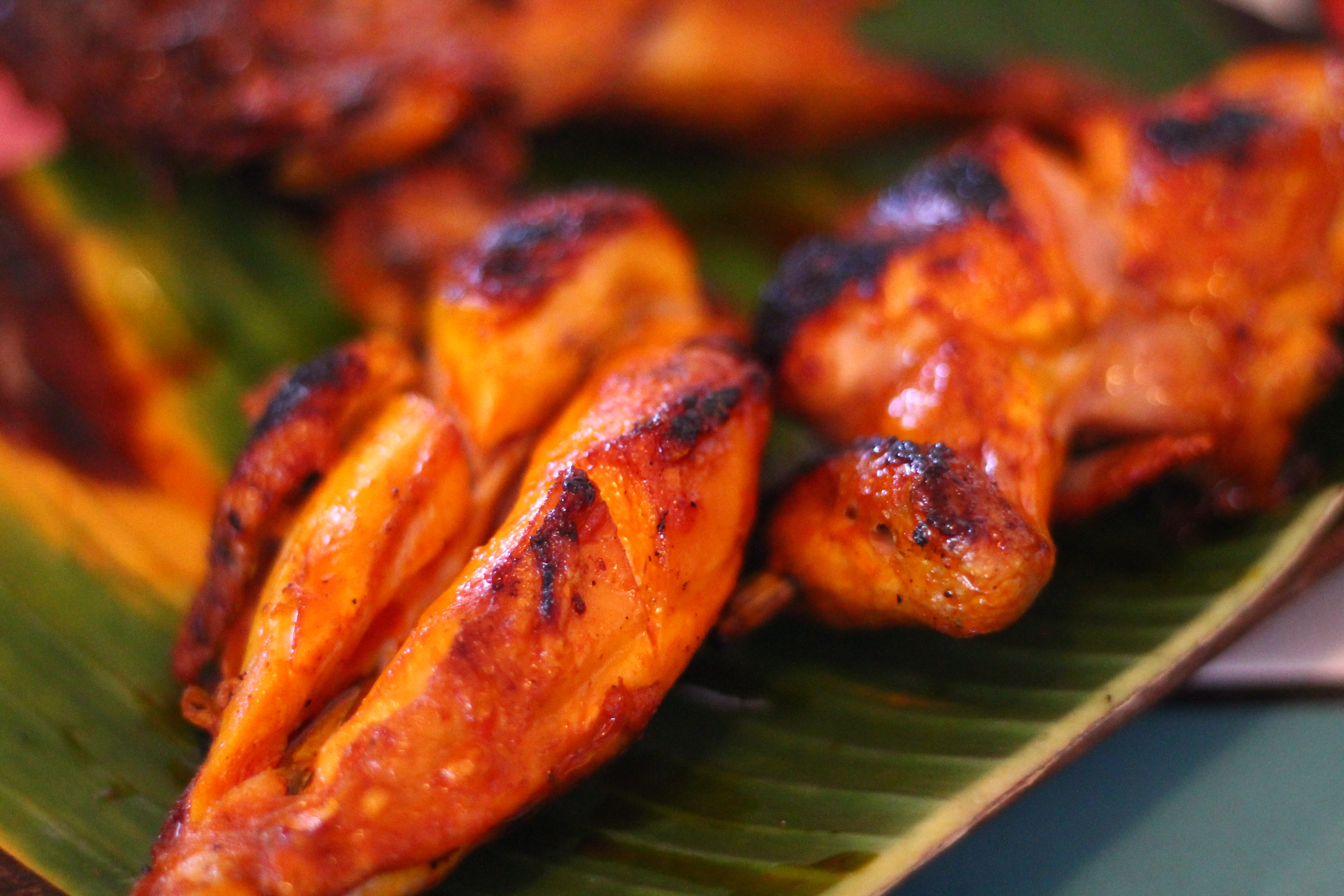
Bacolod's chicken inasal is popular for its distinct marination.

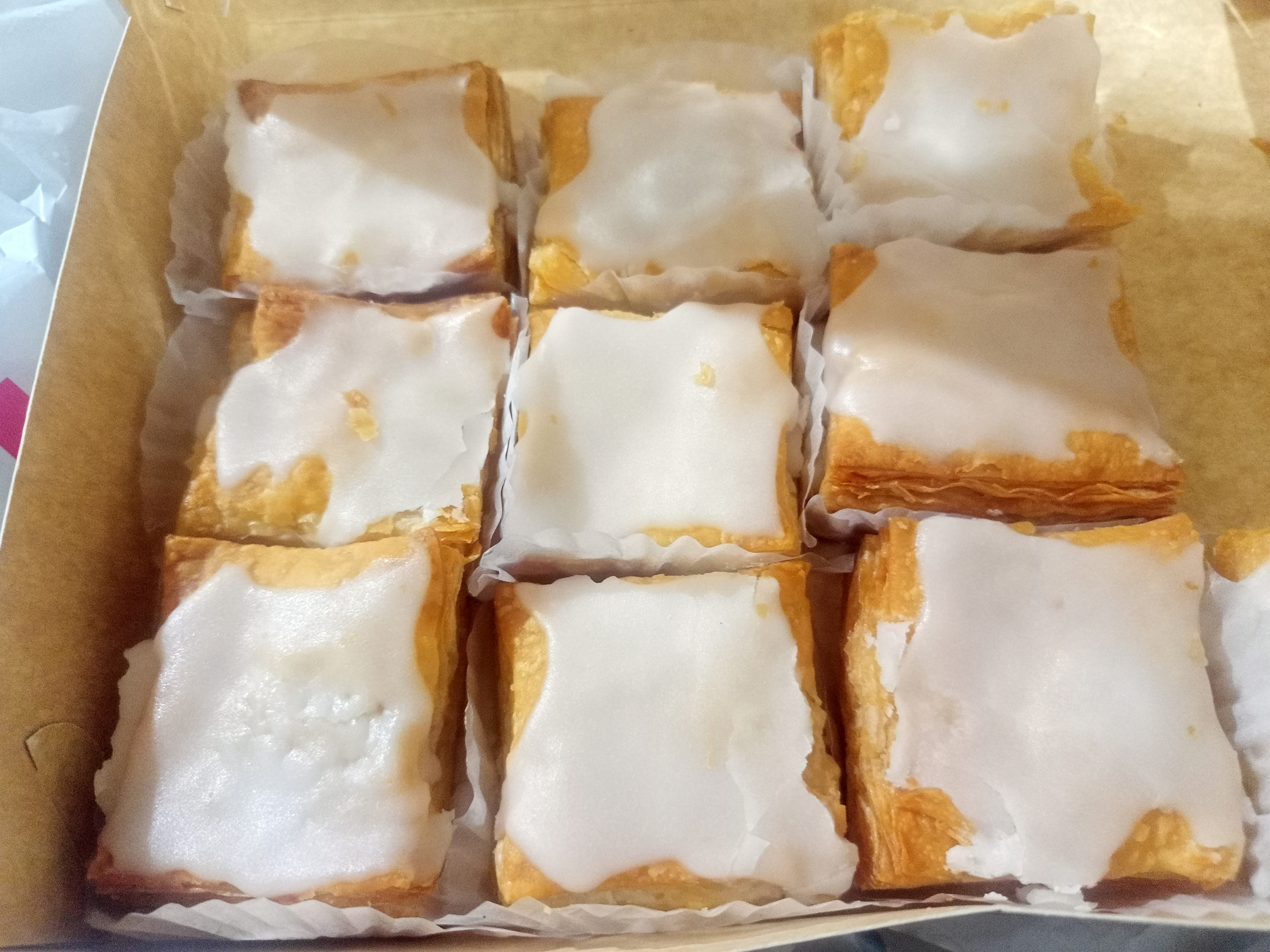
Napoleones, a modern Negrense version of mille-feuille, is a layered flaky puff pastry filled with custard cream and glazed with white sugar on top.

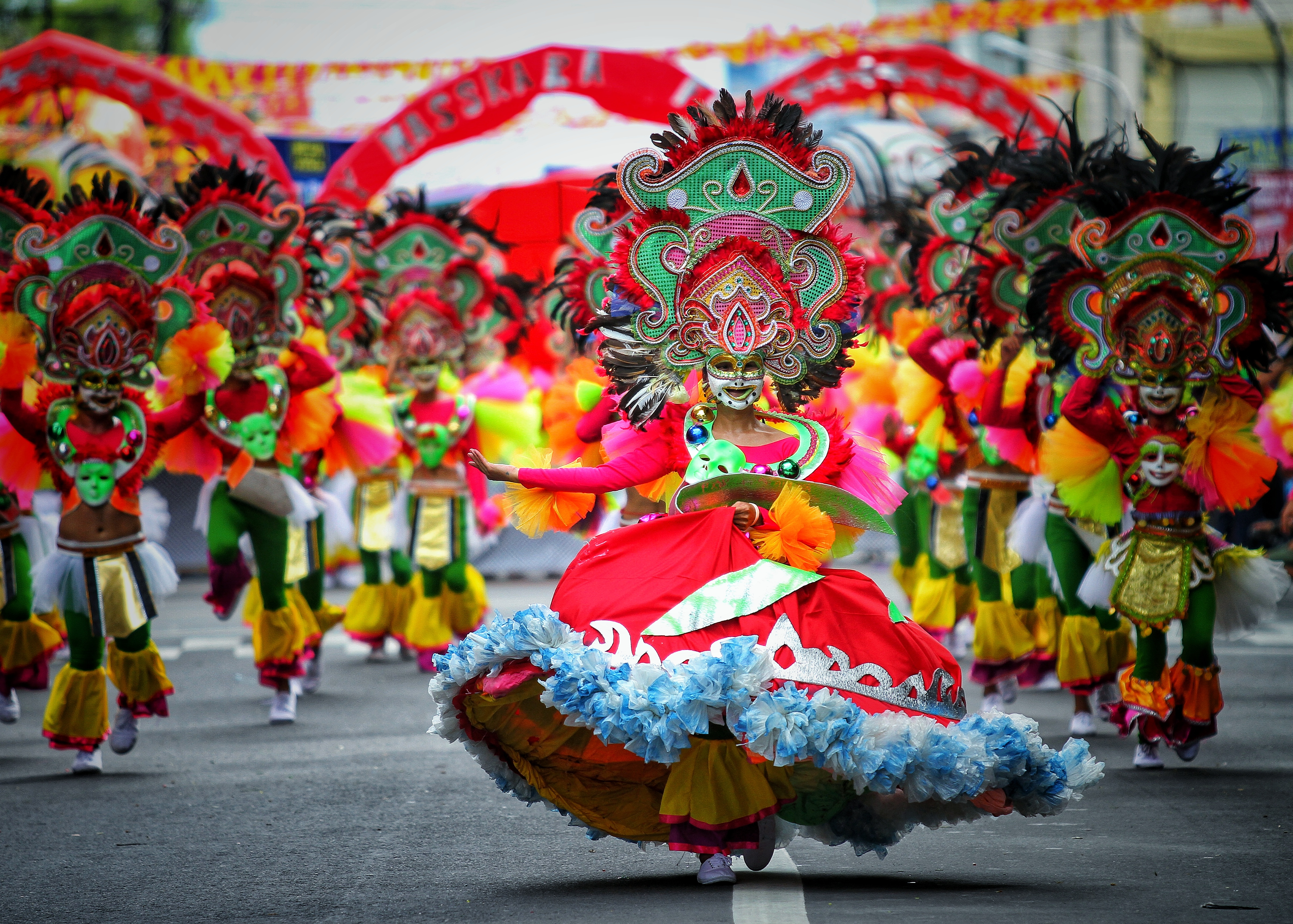
MassKara Festival Street Dancing

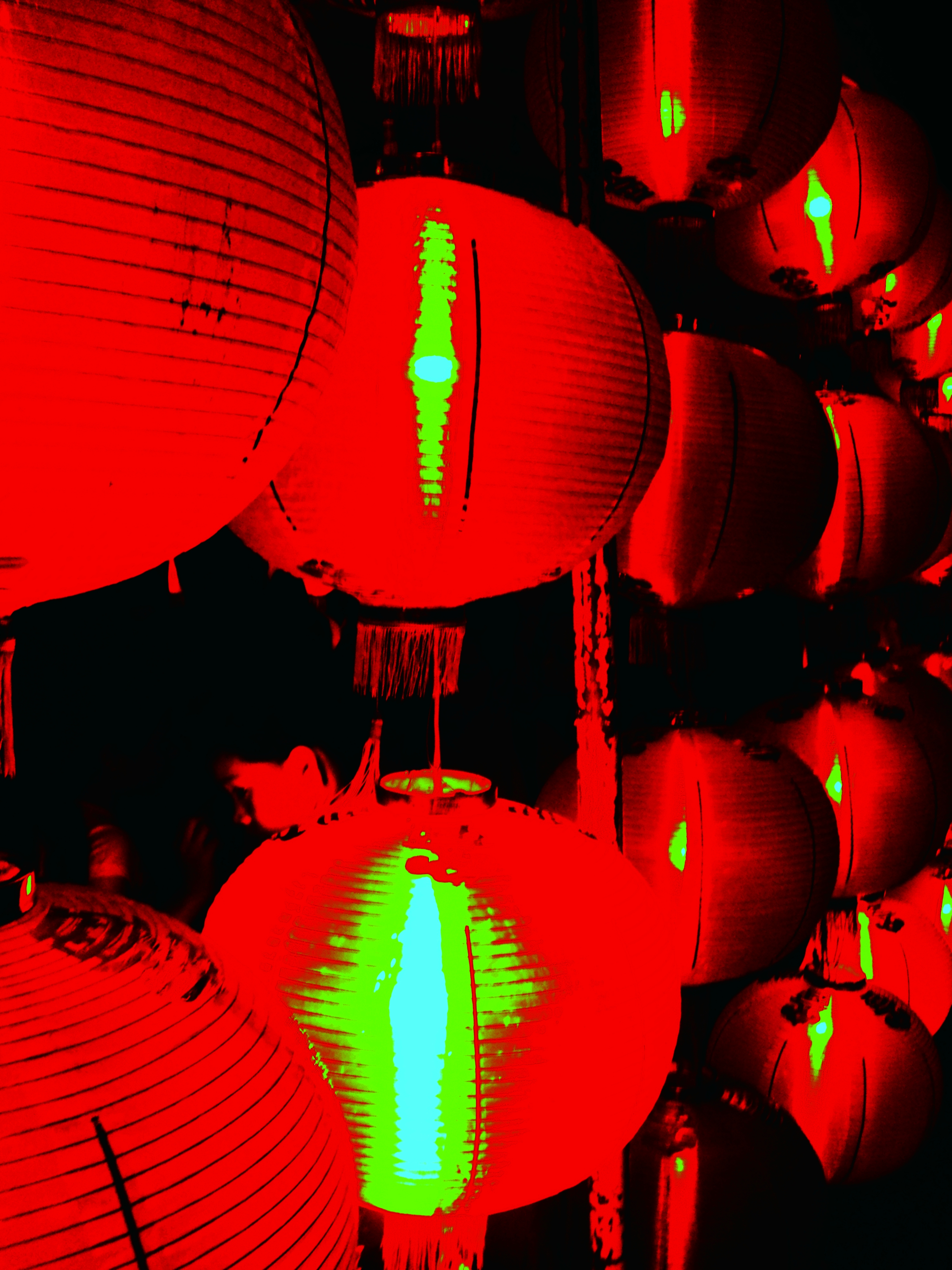
Lantern display during Bacolaodiat

=== Masskara Festival ===
The MassKara Festival (Hiligaynon: Pista sang Maskara, Filipino: Fiesta ng Maskara) is an annual festival held on the fourth Sunday of October in Bacolod. Dancers wear masks, which is where the festival gets its name.

=== Panaad sa Negros Festival ===
The Panaad sa Negros Festival, or just the Panaad Festival (sometimes spelled as Pana-ad), is a festival held annually during the month of April. Panaad is the Hiligaynon word for "vow" or "promise"; the festival is a form of thanksgiving to Divine Providence and commemoration of a vow in exchange for a good life.

The celebration is held at the Panaad Park, which also houses the Panaad Stadium, and is participated in by the 13 cities and 19 towns of the province. For this reason, the province dubs it the "mother" of all its festivals.

=== Bacolaodiat Festival ===
Bacolod's Chinese New Year Festival. It comes from the word "Bacolod" and "Lao Diat" which means celebration.

== Landmarks ==
=== Panaad Park and Sports Complex ===
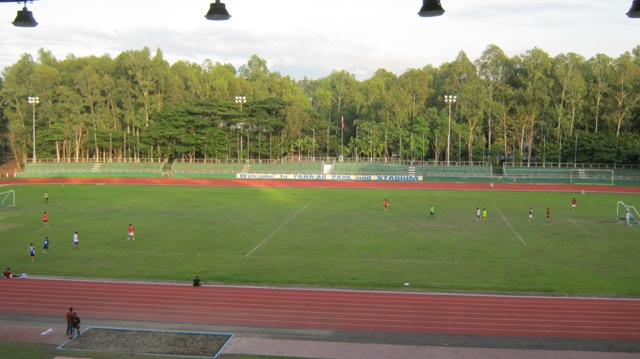
Football field of the Panaad Stadium located within the Panaad Park and Sports Complex

The Panaad Park and Sports Complex is a multi-purpose park in the city owned by the Provincial Government of Negros Occidental. Situated in the complex is the Panaad Stadium which is currently used mostly for football matches. It is the home stadium of Philippines Football League team Ceres–Negros F.C. It was used for the 2005 South East Asian Games and was the venue of the pre-qualifiers of the 2007 ASEAN Football Championship or ASEAN Cup.

The stadium has a seating capacity of 15,500, but holds around 20,000 people with standing areas. It is unofficially designated as the home stadium of the Philippines national football team. Aside from the football field, it also has a rubberized track oval, an Olympic-size swimming pool and other sports facilities. The stadium is also the home of Panaad sa Negros Festival, a week-long celebration participated in by all cities and municipalities in the province held annually every summer. The festival is highlighted by merry-making, field demonstrations, pageant and concert at the stadium. The stadium itself features replicas of the landmarks of the 13 cities and 19 municipalities of Negros Occidental.

=== Bacolod Public Plaza ===
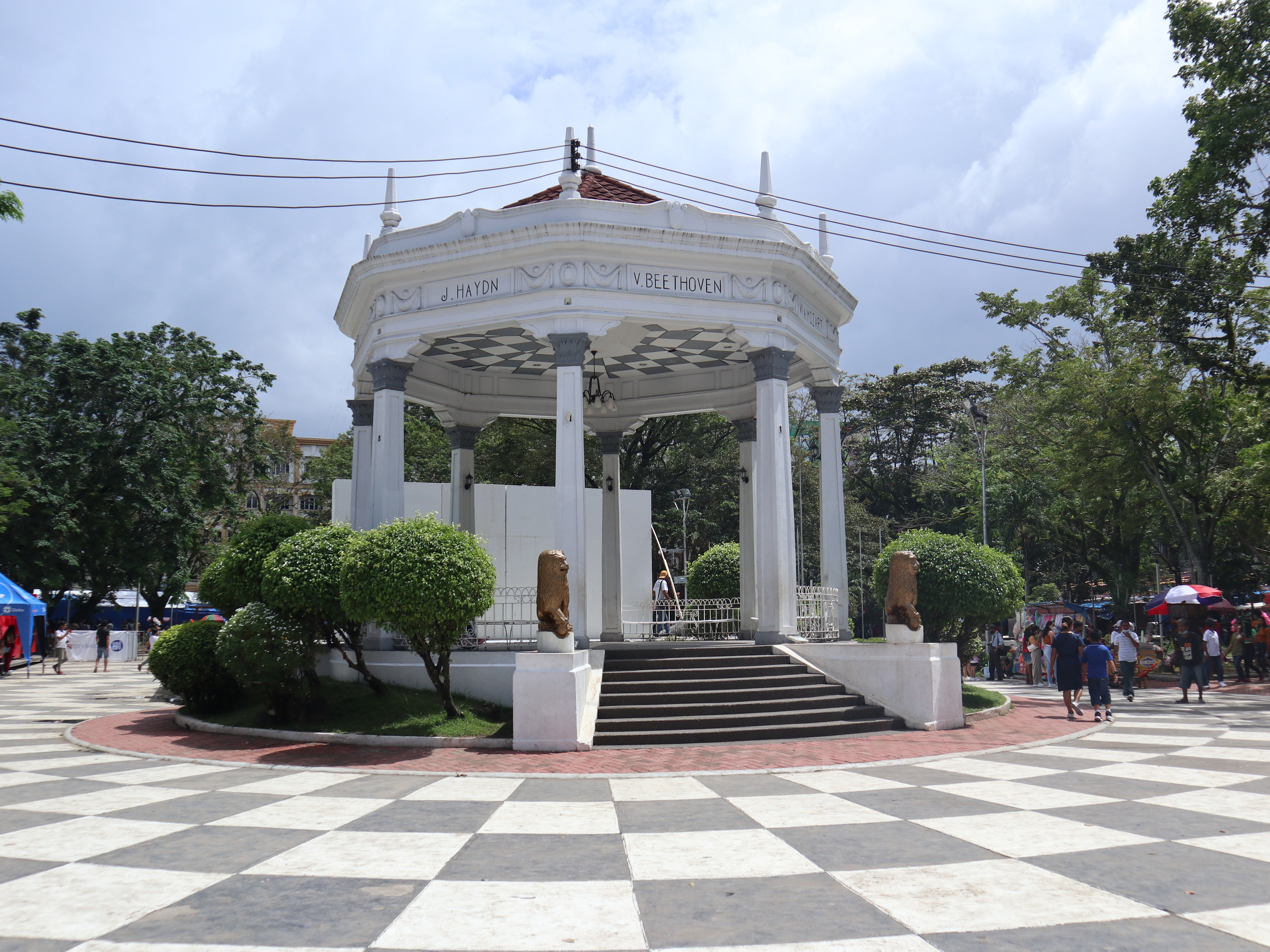
The Bacolod Public Plaza in 2022

The Bacolod Public Plaza is one of the notable landmarks in Bacolod, the capital of Negros Occidental, which is found right in the heart of downtown area, very near to the city hall and right across the San Sebastian Cathedral.

The plaza is the celebrated place of MassKara Festival. It is a week-long festival held each year in Bacolod City every third weekend of October nearest October 19, the city's Charter Anniversary. Bacolod public plaza is the final destination of Masskara street dancing competitions which is the highlights of the celebration.

=== Capitol Park & Lagoon ===
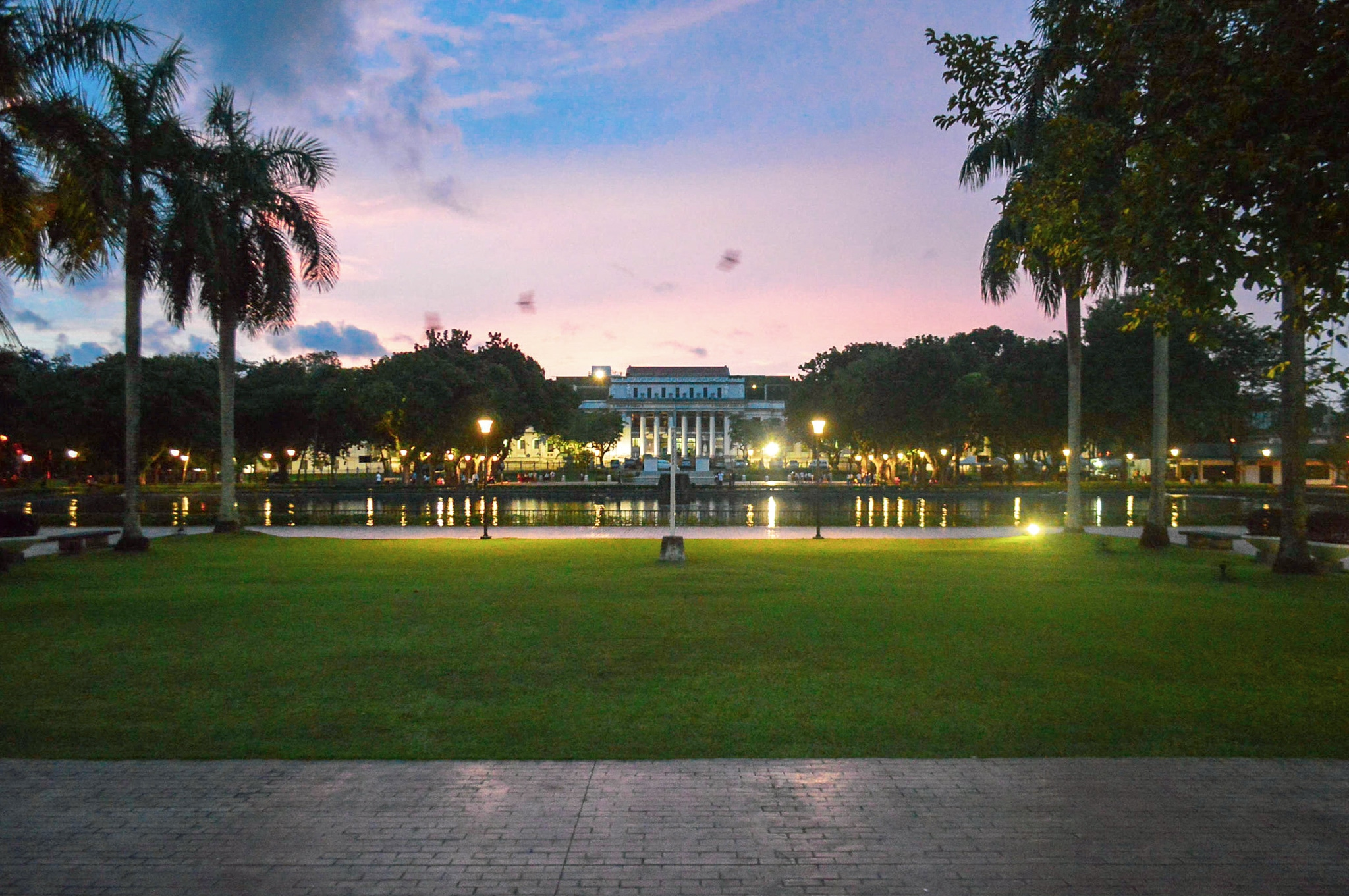
Landscape of the Capitol Park and Lagoon front view

The Capitol Park and Lagoon is a provincial park located right in the heart of Bacolod City, Negros Occidental, in the Philippines. One of the landmarks of the park is the carabao (water buffalo) being reared by a woman. This carabao is located at the northern end of the lagoon. On the southern end, there is also another carabao sculpture being pulled by a man. Locals are known to feed pop corns, pop rice, and other edible delicacies sold within the park to the fishes in the lagoon.

=== Negros Museum ===
Negros Museum is a privately owned provincial museum situated in the Negros Occidental Provincial Capitol Complex in Bacolod City, Philippines. The structure was built in 1925 as the Provincial Agriculture Building. Negros Museum Cafe serves the needs of museum goers and walk-in guests, situated in the West Annex of the museum. It includes a separate entrance, which includes an open-air and an in-house station occasionally used for small theater plays and art exhibitions. The cafe and the resident chef serves as the official caterer of the Office of the Governor and the Provincial Government of Negros Occidental for official dignitary functions

=== Paglaum Sports Complex ===
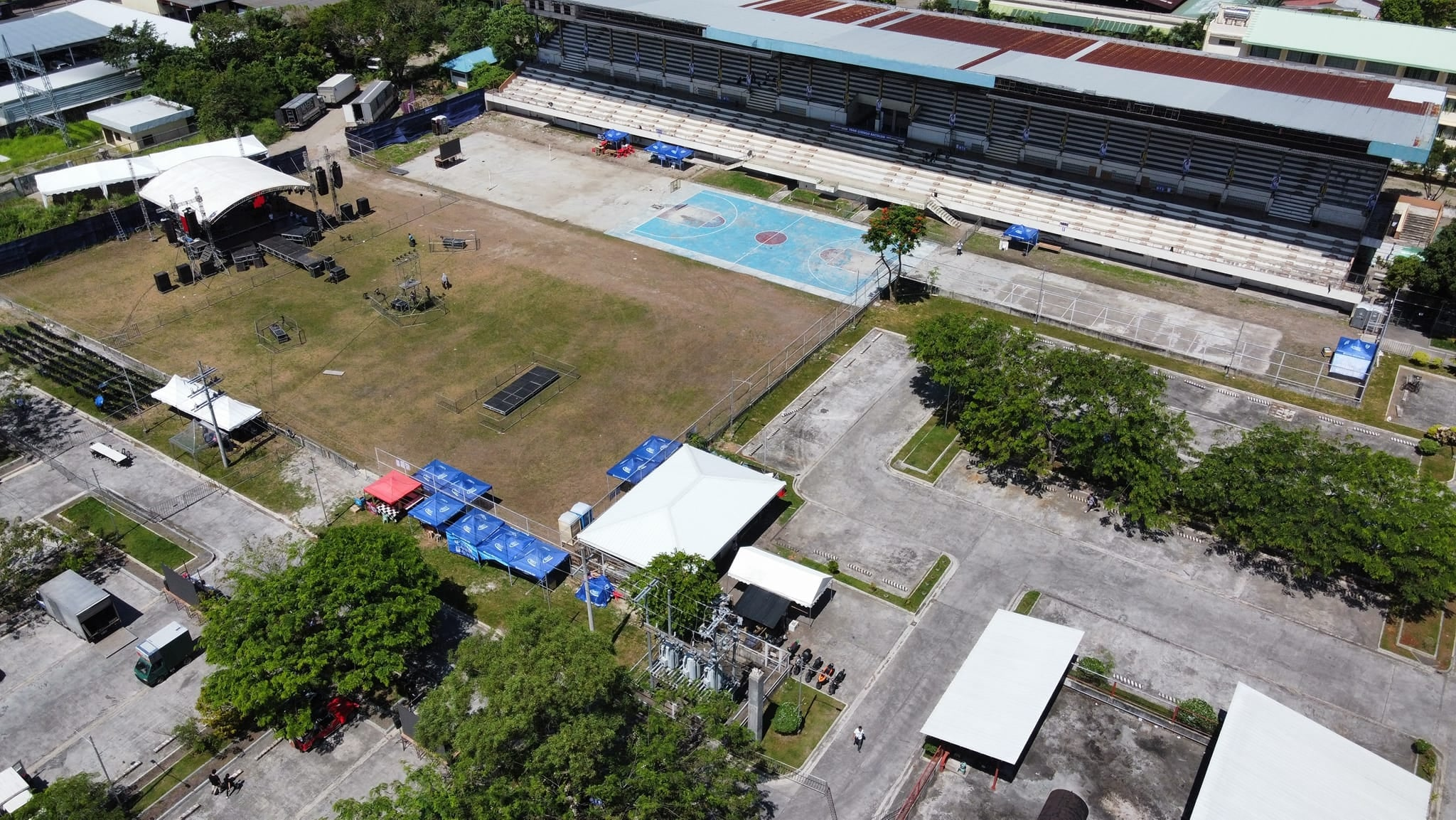
Inside the Paglaum Sports Complex

The Paglaum Sports Complex is a provincial-owned sports venue adjacent to the Negros Occidental High School established during the 1970s that hosted various football events, such as the 1991 Philippines International Cup and the football event of the 2005 Southeast Asian Games. It also hosted three editions of the Palarong Pambansa (1971, 1974, 1979). However, the stadium became unfit to host football matches following the erection of business establishments around the area. In 2012, a two-hectare portion of the four-hectare complex was partitioned for the construction of the Capitol-owned Negros First CyberCentre (NFCC) as an IT-BPO Outsourcing Hub. As of 2013, the provincial government has been proposing for a renovation of the stadium to serve as alternative venue to Panaad Park and Sports Complex, particularly for football competition. Recently, the Paglaum Sports Complex also serves as an alternative venue to the Bacolod Public Plaza for the MassKara Festival celebration.

=== Negros Occidental Multi-Purpose Activity Center ===
The Negros Occidental Multi-Purpose Activity Center (NOMPAC) is a provincial-owned multi-use gym adjacent to the Capitol Park and Lagoon. It is currently used mostly for basketball, karatedo and boxing matches. Aside from the gym, it also serves as evacuation site of the province during calamities likewise also serves as cultural facilities in many events.

=== BAYS Center ===
The Bacolod Arts & Youth Sports Center (BAYS Center) is a multi-use gym fronting the Bacolod Public Plaza. It is used mostly for basketball, karatedo and boxing matches, and was previously used in events in the city like the MassKara Festival activities and other government related activities like seminars, business and political gatherings.

The gym has a seating capacity of more than a thousand. It is officially designated as the COMELEC tally headquarters for both local and national election in the Philippines.

=== Bacolod Baywalk ===
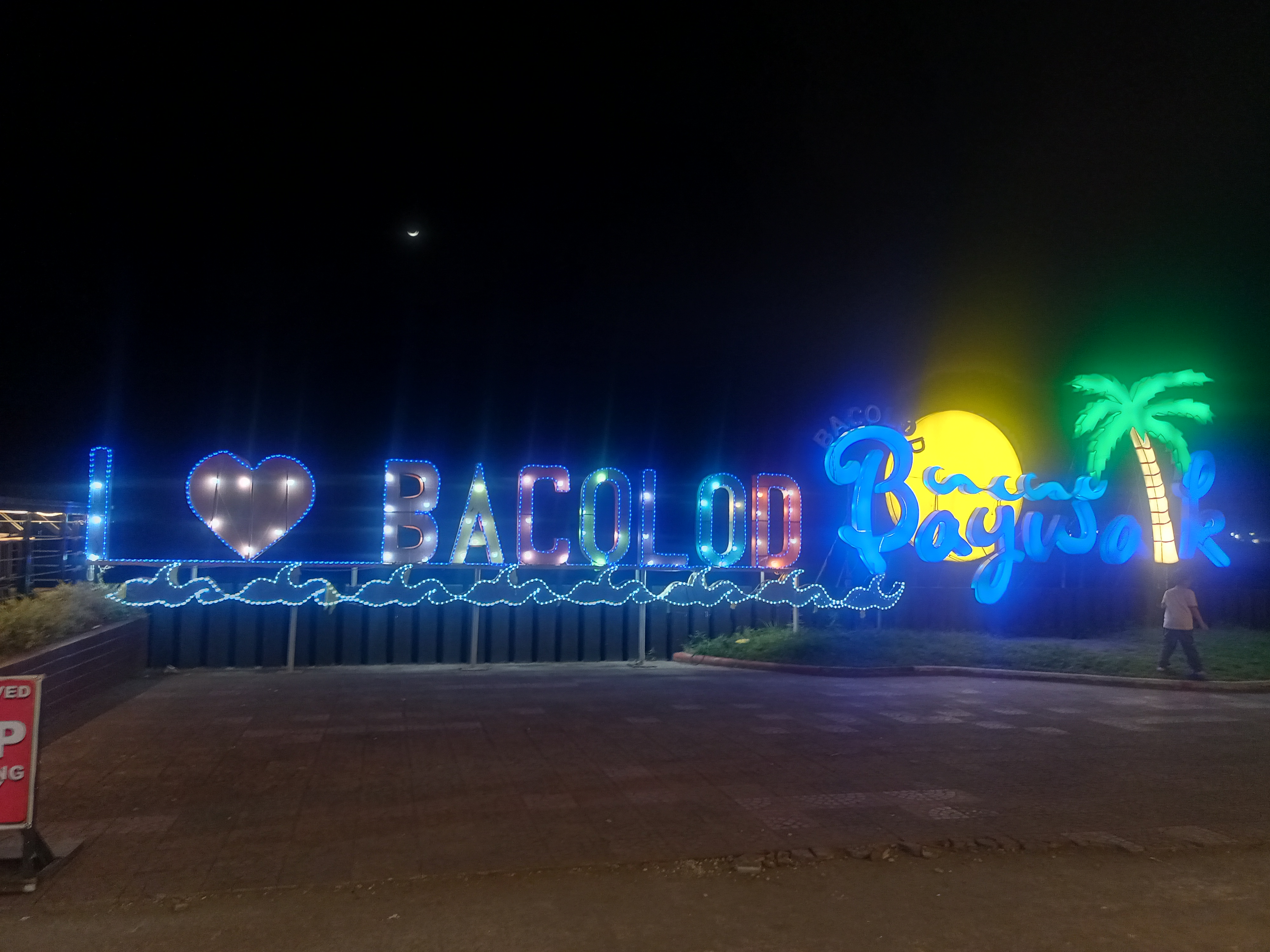
Bacolod Baywalk

The Bacolod Baywalk is a privately owned esplanade situated near the Bacolod Real Estate Development Corporation (BREDCO) at the city's Reclamation Area. It was first opened in 2013 and re-opened to the public in 2022.

=== Art District ===
Art District located along Lacson Street is known for its street art mural and graffiti, restaurants and nightlife.

== Healthcare ==
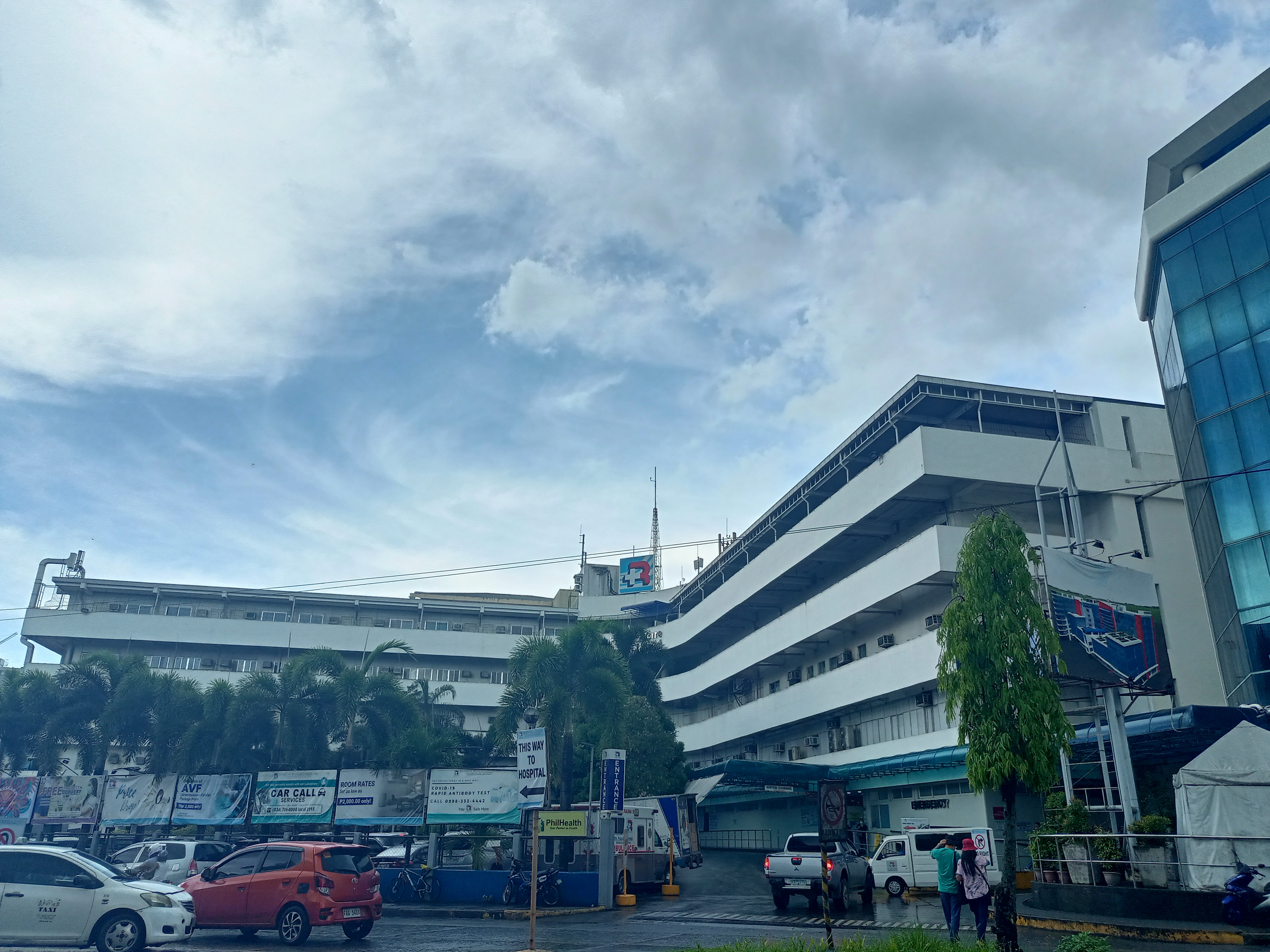
Dr. Pablo O. Torre Memorial Hospital

Bacolod has one public tertiary teaching-learning hospital under the direct management of the Department of Health – Negros Island Regional Office (regional hospital): the Corazon Locsin Montelibano Memorial Regional Hospital (CLMMRH). In September 2022, as per Republic Act 11564, the city government-owned Bacolod City General Hospital held its groundbreaking and is expected to be completed and operational in 2025. The Bacolod City Health Office is responsible for the implementation and planning of the health care programs provided by the city government, which also operates and supervises Health Centers in the barangays of the city. Private hospitals in Bacolod that provide tertiary care include the: Dr. Pablo O. Torre Memorial Hospital (owned and operated by The Riverside Medical Center Inc.); The Doctors' Hospital Inc.; Adventist Medical Center – Bacolod; Bacolod Queen of Mercy Hospital; South Bacolod General Hospital and Medical Center Inc., Metro Bacolod Hospital and Medical Center; and the upcoming Asia–Pacific Medical Center Bacolod Inc.

== Education ==
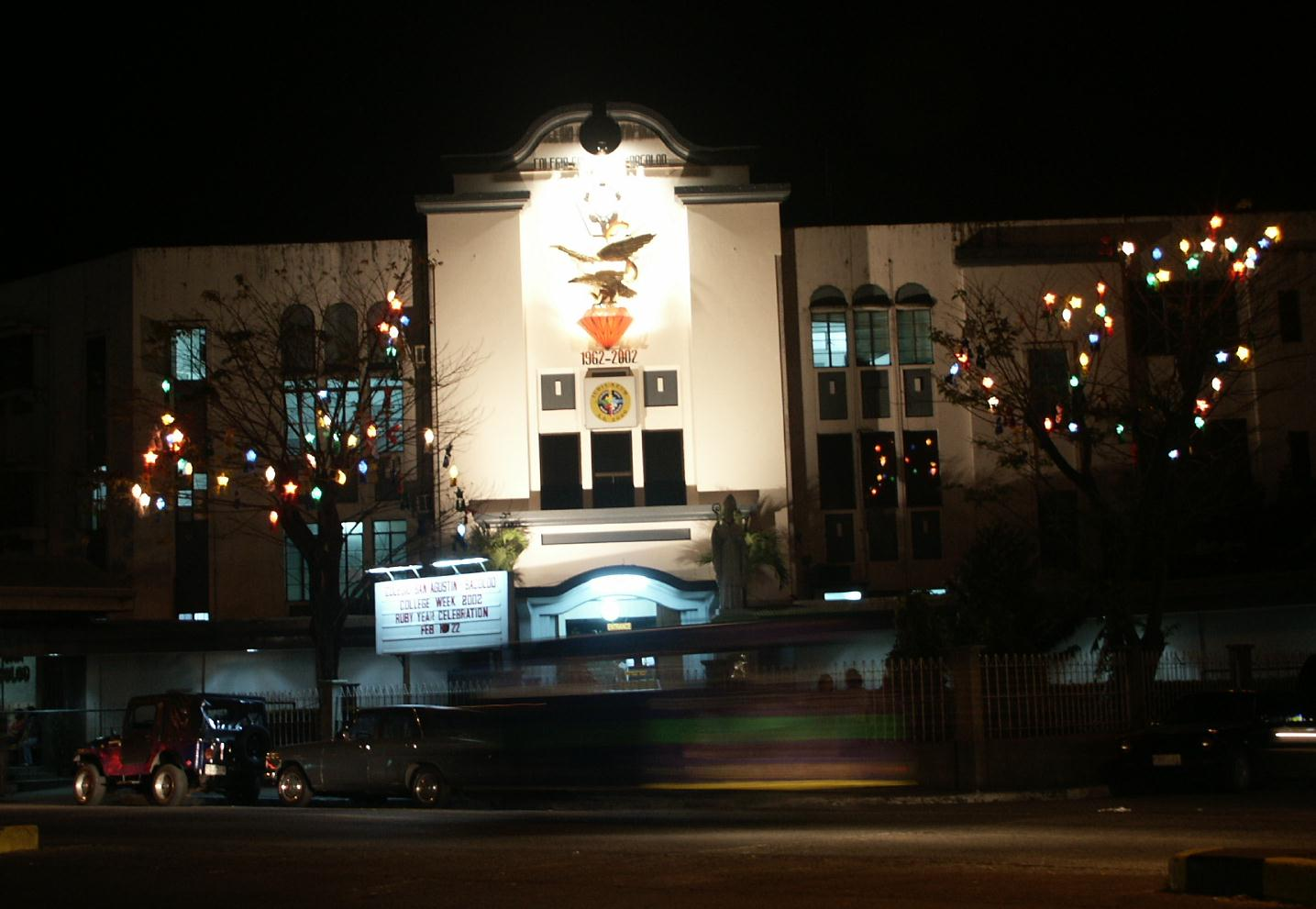
Colegio San Agustin - Bacolod administration building façade

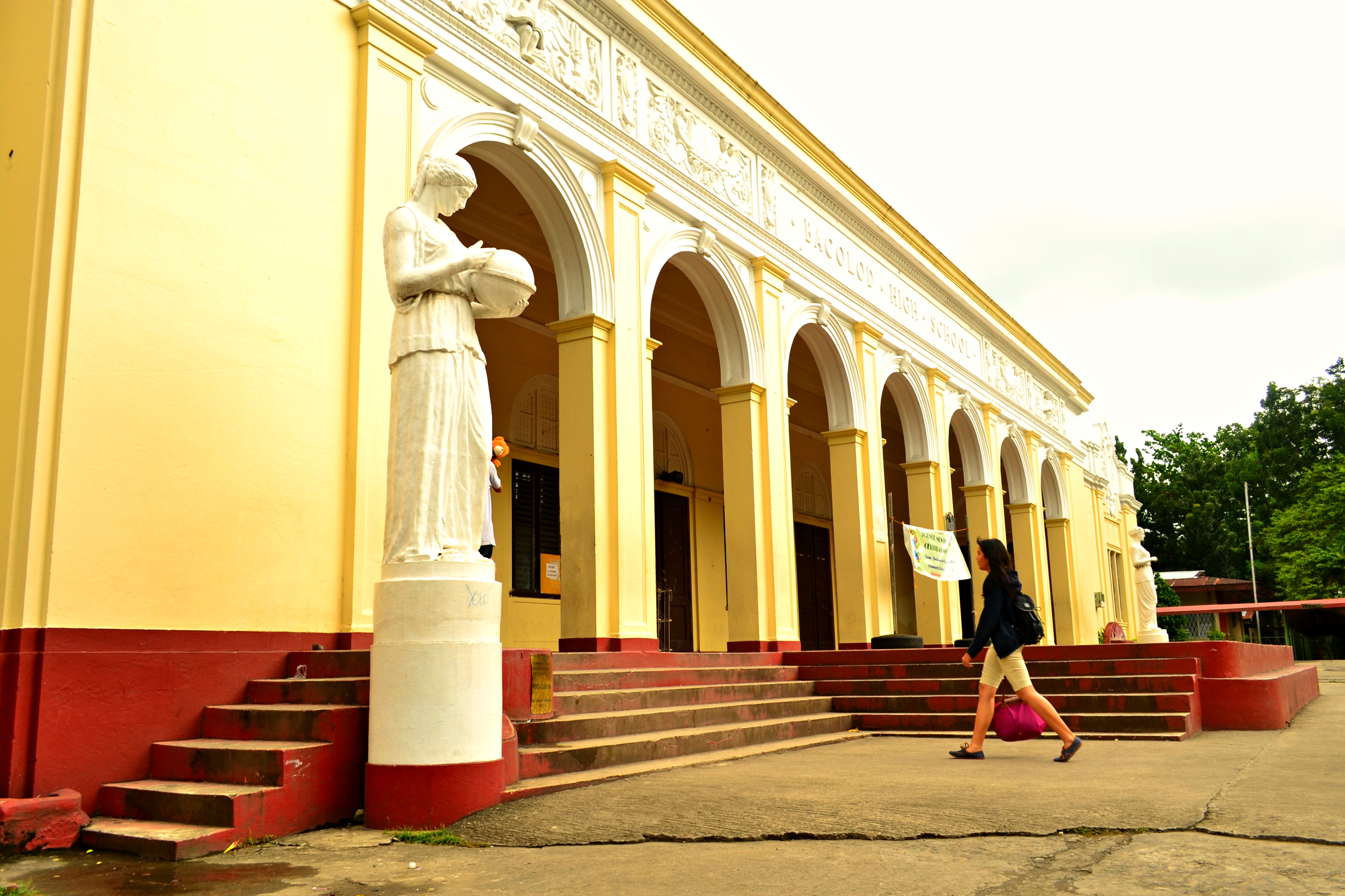
Negros Occidental High School

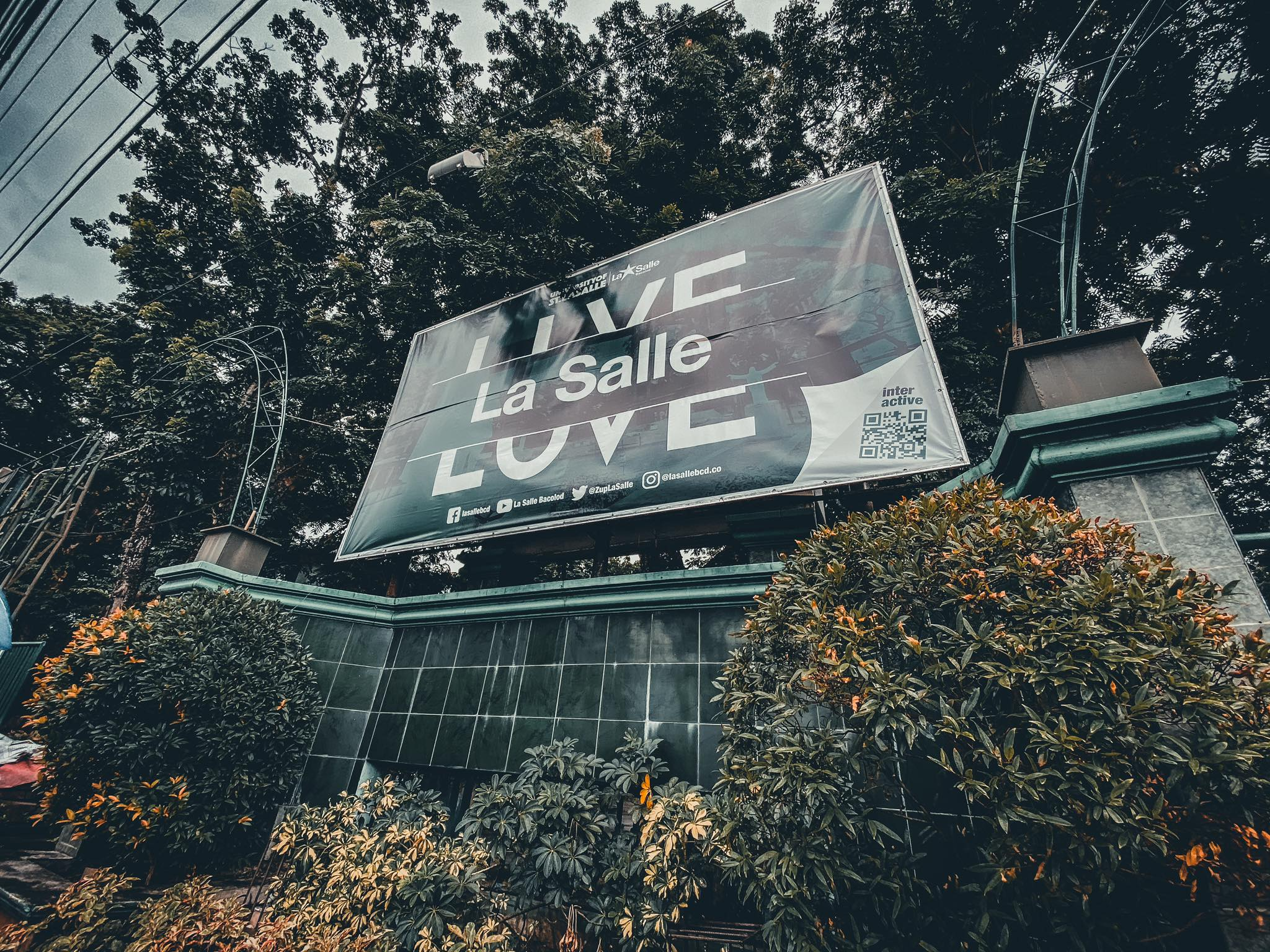
University of St. La Salle entrance

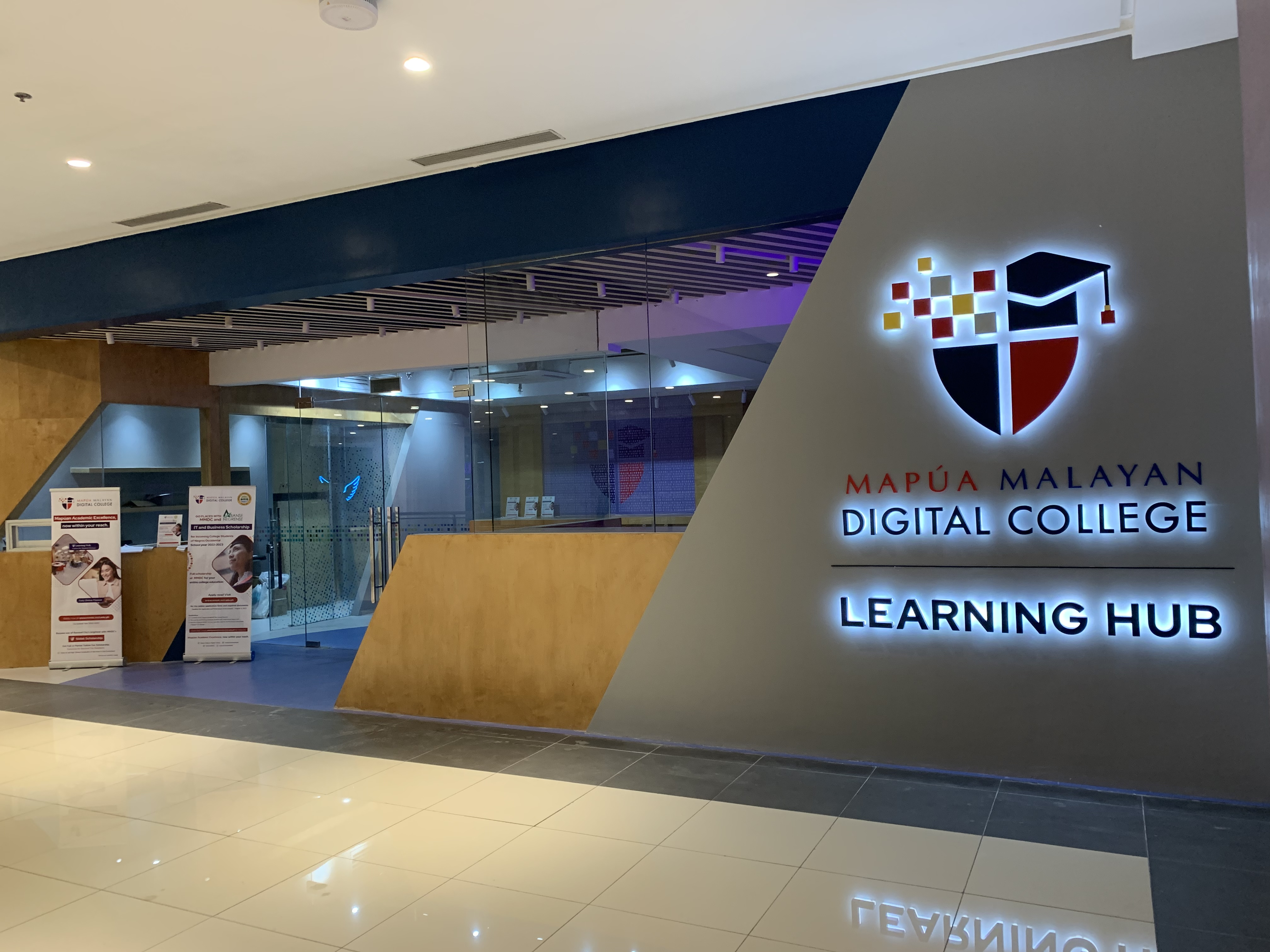
Mapúa Malayan Digital College – Learning Hub Bacolod

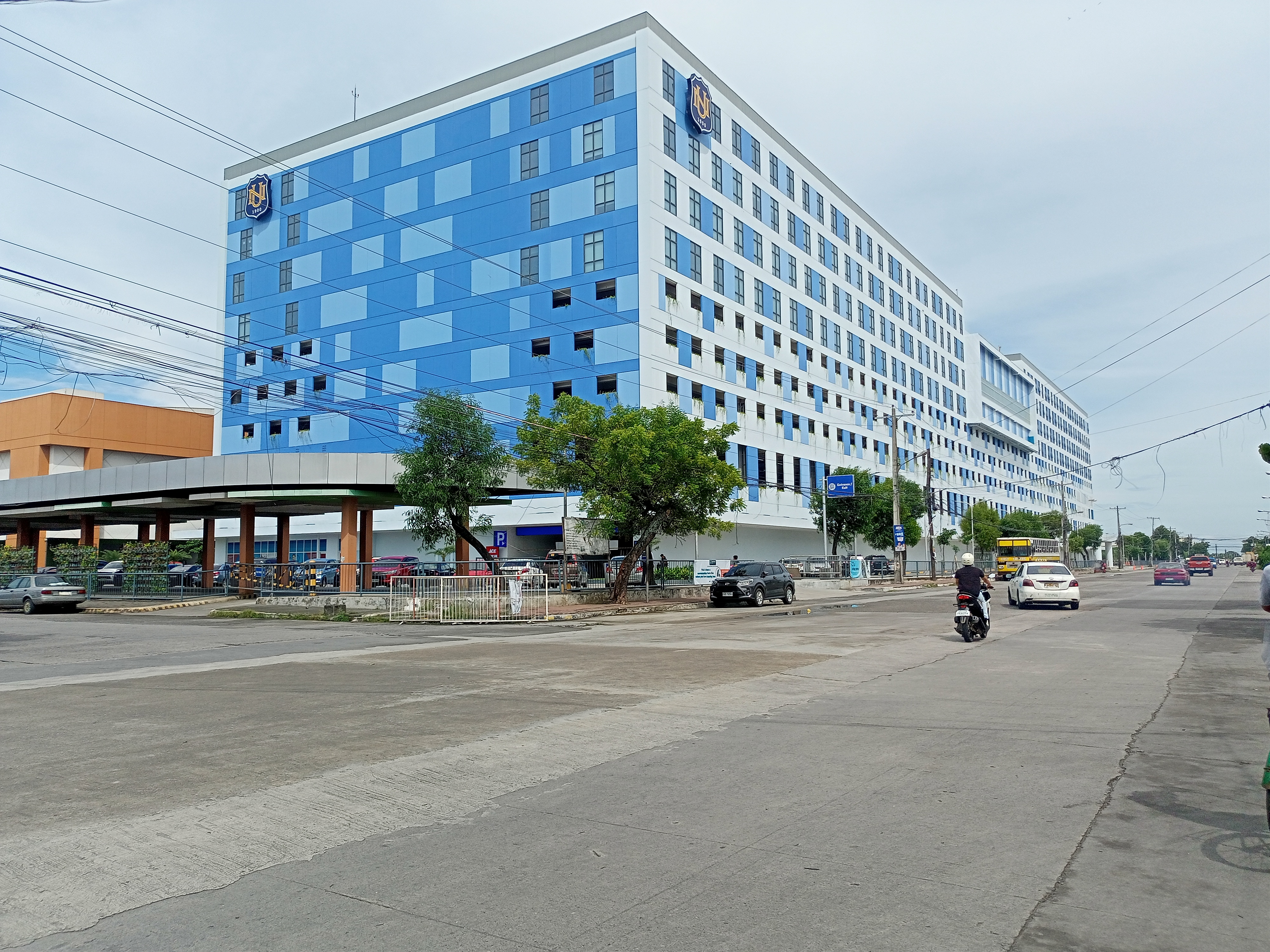
National University Bacolod

Bacolod currently has 5 large universities and more than a dozen other schools specializing in various courses. Currently, as sanctioned by the Department of Education, all primary and secondary institutions in the city use the K-12 and the MATATAG educational system.

The city alone currently hosts five of well-known educational institutions in the nation. These are:

- University of St. La Salle (1952), a Lasallian district school and the second oldest campus founded by the De La Salle Philippines congregation in the country.
- University of Negros Occidental – Recoletos (1941), administered by the Order of Augustinian Recollects and the first university in the province of Negros Occidental and the city of Bacolod.
- STI West Negros University (1948), founded by Baptist Protestants and later acquired by the STI Education Systems Holdings, Inc.
- Carlos Hilado Memorial State University (1954), the only state university that has 2 satellite campuses in Bacolod. Its main campus is located in nearby Talisay City.
- National University (2024), has a satellite campus in Bacolod, considered the first outside Luzon. The University which was originally founded in 1900 in Manila and later acquired by SM Investments in 2008.

Other noteworthy educational institutions include:

- Colegio San Agustin – Bacolod (1962)
- La Consolacion College Bacolod (1919)
- Riverside College, Inc. (1961)
- John B. Lacson Colleges Foundation – Bacolod (1974)
- VMA Global College (1974)
- Bacolod Christian College of Negros (1954)
- Bacolod City College (1997)
- Our Lady of Mercy College – Bacolod (2008)
- College of Arts & Sciences of Asia & the Pacific – Bacolod Campus (2016)
- AMA Computer College – Bacolod Campus (2012)
- ABE International Business College – Bacolod Campus (1999)
- Asian College of Aeronautics – Bacolod Branch (Main Campus) (2003)
- Mapúa Malayan Digital College – Learning Hub Bacolod (2022)
- St. Benilde School (1987)
- St. Joseph School–La Salle (1960)
- St. Scholastica's Academy – Bacolod (1958)
- St. John's Institute (Hua Ming) (1959)
- Bacolod Tay Tung High School (1934)
- Bacolod City National High School (1948)
- Jack and Jill School/Castleson High (1963/1995)
- Bacolod Trinity Christian School, Inc. (1976)
- Negros Occidental High School (1902)

== Transportation ==
=== Airports ===
The Bacolod-Silay Airport terminal building

The Bacolod–Silay Airport, located in nearby City of Silay, is 15 kilometers north-east from Bacolod. Bacolod is 1 hour by air from Manila, 30 minutes by air from Cebu, 1 hour by air from Cagayan de Oro and 1 hour and 10 minutes by air from Davao City.

Bacolod City Domestic Airport was the former airport serving the general area of Bacolod. It was one of the busiest airports in the Western Visayas region, when Bacolod and Negros Occidental were both still part of it. This airport was later replaced by the new Bacolod–Silay International Airport, located in Silay. It was classified as such by the Civil Aviation Authority of the Philippines or CAAP, a body of the Department of Transportation that is responsible for the operations of all other airports in the Philippines except the major international airports. The Bacolod City Domestic Airport ceased operations on January 17, 2008, prior to the opening of the Bacolod–Silay International Airport which began operations the day after.

=== Ports ===
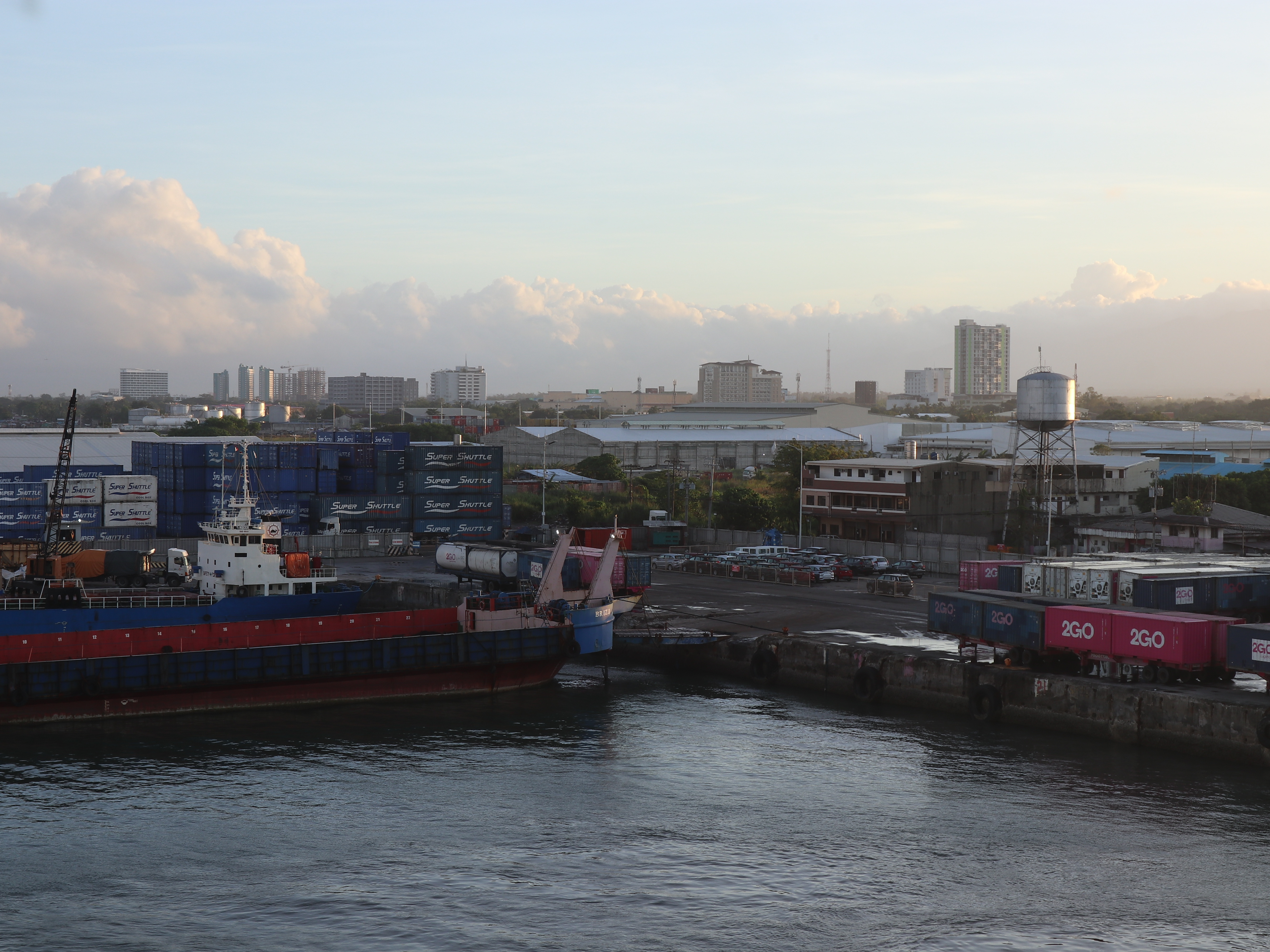
BREDCO Port

Ferries moored at BREDCO Port

BREDCO Port and Port of Banago are the vessels entry point in Bacolod. It has Fastcrafts going to Iloilo City daily, with different companies such as Weesam Express, OceanJet, and Montenegro Lines. It also has Roll-on/Roll-off (RORO) vessels going daily, to the Port of Dumangas, Iloilo with companies such as Montenegro Lines, FastCat, Starlite Ferries, and Tri-Star Megalink.

2GO Travel has routes from Bacolod going to Manila, Batangas, Iloilo and Cagayan de Oro.

Bacolod is 18 to 23 hours from the Port of Manila, 12 to 15 hours from the Port of Cagayan de Oro, 2 to 3 hours from the Port of Dumangas and 1 hour from the Port of Iloilo.

=== Land routes ===
Downtown Bacolod street

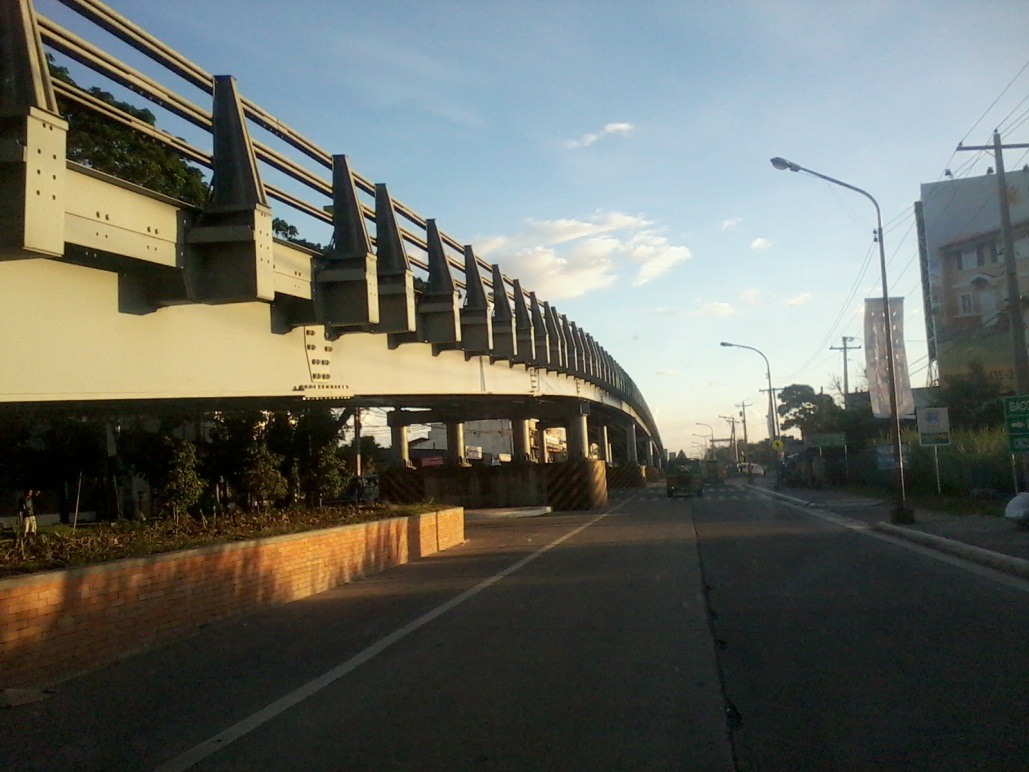
The Lacson-Circumferential (Bata) Flyover

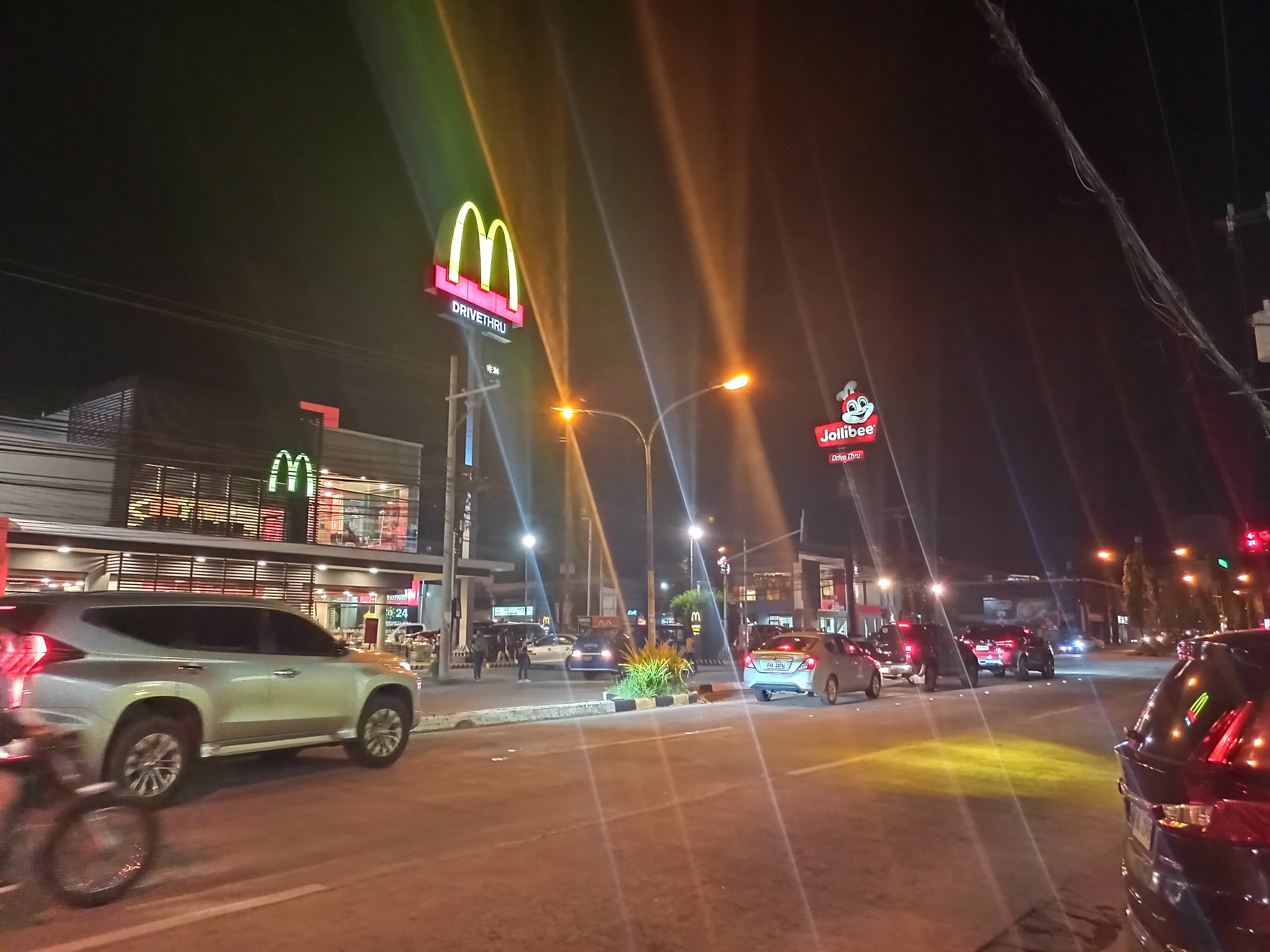
B.S. Aquino Drive

Bacolod has two main roads, Lacson Street to the north and Araneta Street to the south. The streets in the downtown area are one way. Recently, Bacolod City is experiencing an increase in traffic congestion due to an increase in number of vehicles.

Bacolod is about 2 hours from Iloilo City via the Dumangas route. From Cebu City, travel takes 6-9 hours via the San Carlos-Toledo ferry route, or around 8 hours via the Escalante-Tabuelan ferry route.

To Dumaguete, Bacolod is roughly 4 hours via Kabankalan, Mabinay, and Bais covering 215 km (134 mi).

=== Accredited transport cooperatives ===
As of 2021:

- Bacolod South, Sum-ag, Punta Taytay Transport Service Cooperative
- Metro Bacolod Transport Service Cooperative-EAST
- Negros East Transport Service Cooperative
- Regional Transport Service Cooperative (RETRANSCO)
- United Negros Transport Cooperative
- CHORET Corporation

== Sister cities ==
Bacolod has the following sister cities:

=== Local ===
- Cebu City
- Dumaguete
- Iloilo City
- Legazpi, Albay
- Makati
- Marikina
- Naga, Camarines Sur
- Parañaque
- Taguig

=== International ===
- Andong, South Korea
- Darwin, Australia
- Kamloops, Canada
- Keelung, Taiwan
- Long Beach, California, United States – However, Sister Cities International designates Bacolod and Long Beach as Friendship Cities.
- Singaraja, Indonesia

== See also ==
- Negros Occidental
- Hiligaynon language
- Metro Bacolod
- Ceres–Negros F.C.
