= Township =

Type of settlement or urban area

A township is a form of human settlement or administrative subdivision. Its exact definition varies among countries.

Although the term is occasionally associated with an urban area, this tends to be an exception to the rule. In Australia, Canada, Scotland, and parts of the United States, the term refers to settlements too small or scattered to be considered urban.

== Australia ==
The Australian National Dictionary defines a township as "a site reserved for and laid out as a town; such a site at an early stage of its occupation and development; a small town".

The term refers purely to the settlement; it does not refer to a unit of government. Townships are governed as part of a larger council (such as that of a shire, district or city) or authority.

== Canada ==
In Canada, two kinds of township occur in common use:

- In Eastern Canada, a township is one form of the subdivision of a county. In Canadian French, this is a canton. Townships are referred to as "lots" in Prince Edward Island; they merely form census subdivisions and are not administrative units. In Canada, a municipality is a city, town, township, county, or regional municipality which has been incorporated by statute by the legislatures of the provinces and territories.
- In Western Canada, townships exist only for the purpose of land division by the Dominion Land Survey and do not form administrative units. These townships are nominally six miles by six miles (36 square miles, or roughly 93 km^{2}). Townships are designated by their township number and range number. Township 1 is the first north of the First Base Line, and the numbers increase to the north. While not an administrative unit, Alberta and Saskatchewan do have numbered township and range roads in rural areas based on the old Dominion Land Survey. In Saskatchewan and Manitoba, rural municipalities, township-like administrative units below the provincial level, are made up of groups of said surveyed townships.

== China ==
As defined by the Constitution of China, a township is one of the possible third-level administrative divisions of the country, directly below a county.

== India ==
In India, townships are found at the fourth level of the city.

== Jersey ==
In Jersey, township is a redundant term, as the only surviving local government level at present are the 12 parishes of the island.

== Malaysia ==
In Malaysia, townships are found at the third level of the administrative hierarchy, is a subdivision of a daerah (district or county) or autonomous sub-district (daerah kecil), while above kampung (village) and taman (residential neighbourhood) as defined in the National Land Code, adopted in 1965.

== New Zealand ==
In New Zealand, towns and townships no longer exist; all land is part of either a city, which is mostly urban, or a district, which is mostly rural. Since 1979, municipalities have existed in New Zealand but are rare and not formally defined legally.

As a term, however, townships are still in common usage in New Zealand, used in referring to a small town or urban community located in a rural area. The term is generally comparable to that of a village in England.

== Philippines ==
In the Philippines, townships refer to administrative divisions established during the American Civil Government in the country. Many of these political divisions were originally established as rancherias during the Spanish Regime. The term was later replaced with "municipal district". Most municipal districts would later be converted into regular municipalities by executive orders from the Philippine president.

Mambukal, a hill station geographically located in Murcia, Negros Occidental, is the only legally constituted township in the Philippines, created under Republic Act No. 1964, approved in June 1957.

As a term, the word "township" in the Philippines is used to refer to new developments with their own amenities, including both vertical and horizontal projects. The modern and largest townships in the Philippines are New Clark City with 9,450 hectares in Capas of Tarlac, Hamilo Coast with 5,900 hectares in Nasugbu of Batangas, Nuvali with 2,290 hectares in Santa Rosa of Laguna, Lancaster New City with 2,000 hectares in Kawit Imus GenTri of Cavite, Vista City with 1,500 hectares in Las Piñas Muntinlupa of Metro Manila, and Dasmariñas of Cavite, Twin Lakes with 1,149 hectares in Tagaytay of Cavite and Alviera with 1,125 hectares in Porac of Pampanga. The majority of the current townships are near Metro Manila, which permits faster access to the capital region by road or rail transport.

== Post-Soviet countries ==
The former Russian Empire, Soviet Union, and Commonwealth of Independent States states is sometimes used to denote a small semi-urban, sometimes industrial, settlement and used to translate the terms поселок городского типа (townlet), посад (posad), местечко (mestechko, from Polish "miasteczko", a small town; in the cases of predominant Jewish population the latter is sometimes translated as shtetl).

== South Africa ==
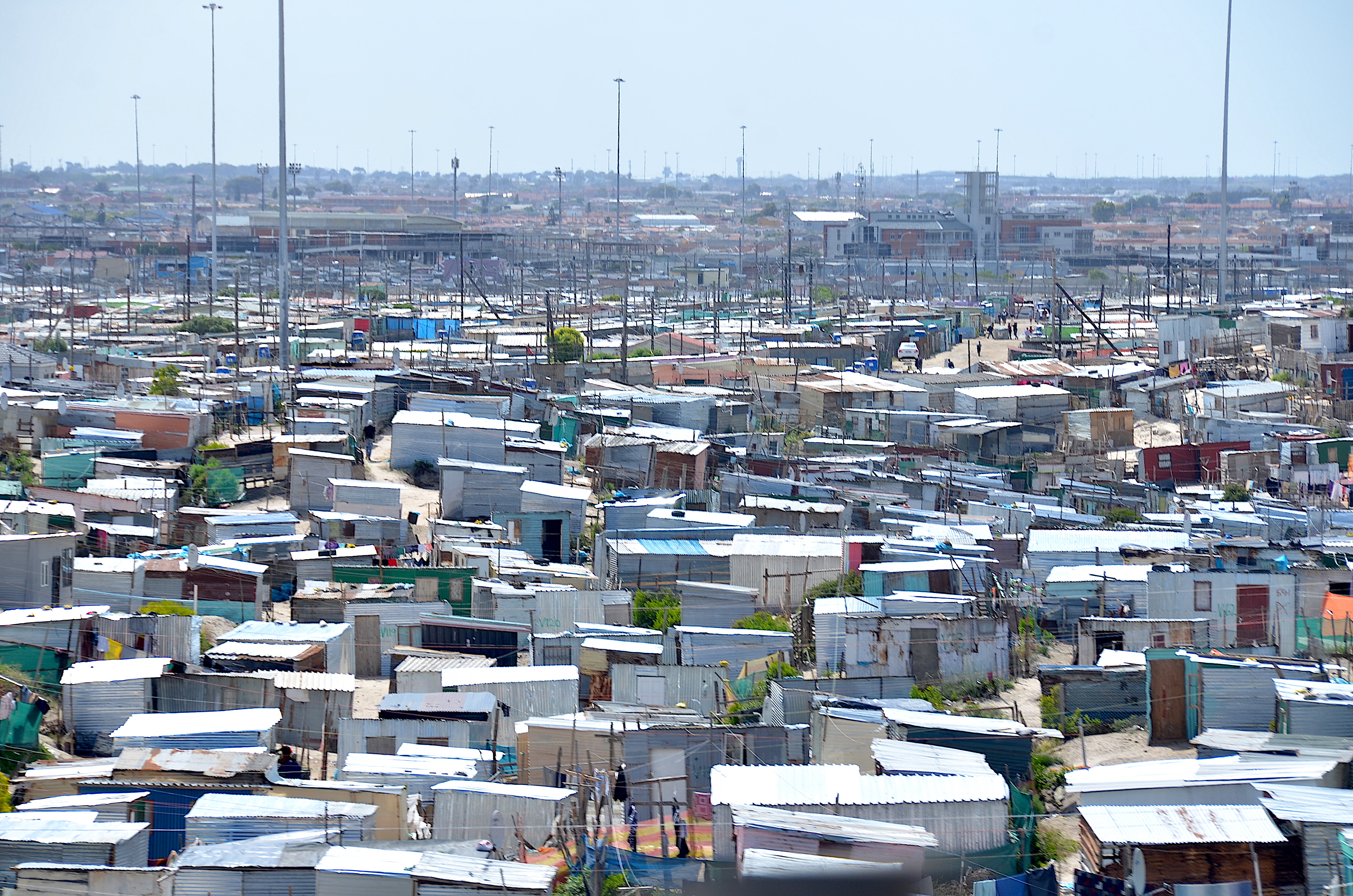
Khayelitsha, a township in South Africa

In South Africa under apartheid, the term "township" was used to describe residential developments that confined non-Whites, including Blacks, Coloureds, and Indians, living near or working in White-only communities. Soweto and Mdantsane were both prominent townships under apartheid. The term also has a precise legal meaning and is used on land titles in all areas regardless of the demographics of the respective region.

== Taiwan ==
In Taiwan, townships are administered by a county together with a county-administered city. There are three types of townships in Taiwan: urban townships, rural townships, and mountain indigenous townships. Mountain indigenous townships are those with significant populations of Taiwanese aborigines.

== United Kingdom ==
=== England ===
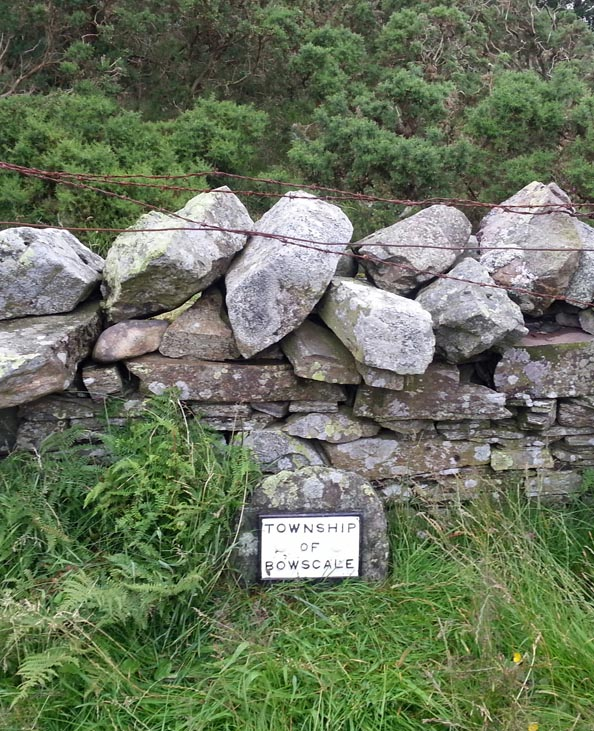
Township boundary marker at Mungrisdale, Cumbria. The marker has been restored for historical purposes.

In England, the term "township" is no longer in official use, but still maintains some meaning, typically used to describe subdivisions of large parishes for administrative purposes. This definition became legally obsolete at the end of the 19th century when local government reform converted many townships that had been subdivisions of ancient parishes into the newer civil parishes, which formally separated the connection between the ecclesiastical functions of ancient parishes and the civil administrative functions that had been introduced in these areas beginning in the 16th century. As of the 21st century, some councils, mostly in Northern England, have revived the term.

=== Scotland ===
In Scotland, the term is still used for some rural settlements. In parts of the Highlands and Islands, a township is a crofting settlement. In the Highlands generally the term may describe a very small agrarian community.

=== Wales ===
In Wales, the term "township" is used to describe a population center created by an Act of Parliament in 1539, such as the Townships in Montgomeryshire.

== United States ==
In the United States, a township is a subdivision of a county and is usually 36 square miles (about 93 square kilometres) in area. There are two types of townships in the United States: civil and survey. A state may have one or both types. In states that have both, the boundaries often coincide in many counties.

- A civil township is a unit of local government in the U.S., which is subordinate to a county. Specific responsibilities and the degree of autonomy vary based on the laws of the respective state. In many states, townships are organized and operate under the authority of state statutes, similar to counties. In others, townships operate as municipal corporations, which are chartered entities with a degree of home rule. Notable exceptions include New Jersey and Pennsylvania, where townships are a class of incorporation with fixed boundaries and equal standing to a village, town, borough, or city, analogous to a New England town or towns in New York.
- A survey township is a unit of land measure defined by the Public Land Survey System, which in many states has no governmental function.

=== Puerto Rico ===
In the first U.S. census of Puerto Rico, the population centers known as townships were referred to as "barrios," a term first used when Puerto Rico was under Spanish colonial rule.

Like townships in most U.S. states, barrios are subdivisions and function as municipalities.

== Vietnam ==
In Vietnam, a commune-level town (thị trấn) is similar to a township; it is a subdivision of a rural district (huyện) and is the lowest administration subdivision in the country.

== Zimbabwe ==
In Zimbabwe, the term township was used for segregated parts of suburban areas. During colonial years in Rhodesia, the term township referred to a residential area reserved for Black citizens within the boundaries of a city or town and is still commonly used colloquially. This reflected the South African usage.

In present-day Zimbabwe, the term is also used to refer to a residential area within close proximity of a rural growth point.

== See also ==
- Croft (Scotland)
- Market town
- Shtetl
- Town
- Townland
- Urban-type settlement
