= Negros Museum =

Museum in Bacolod, Philippines

- Museo sang Negros (Hiligaynon)

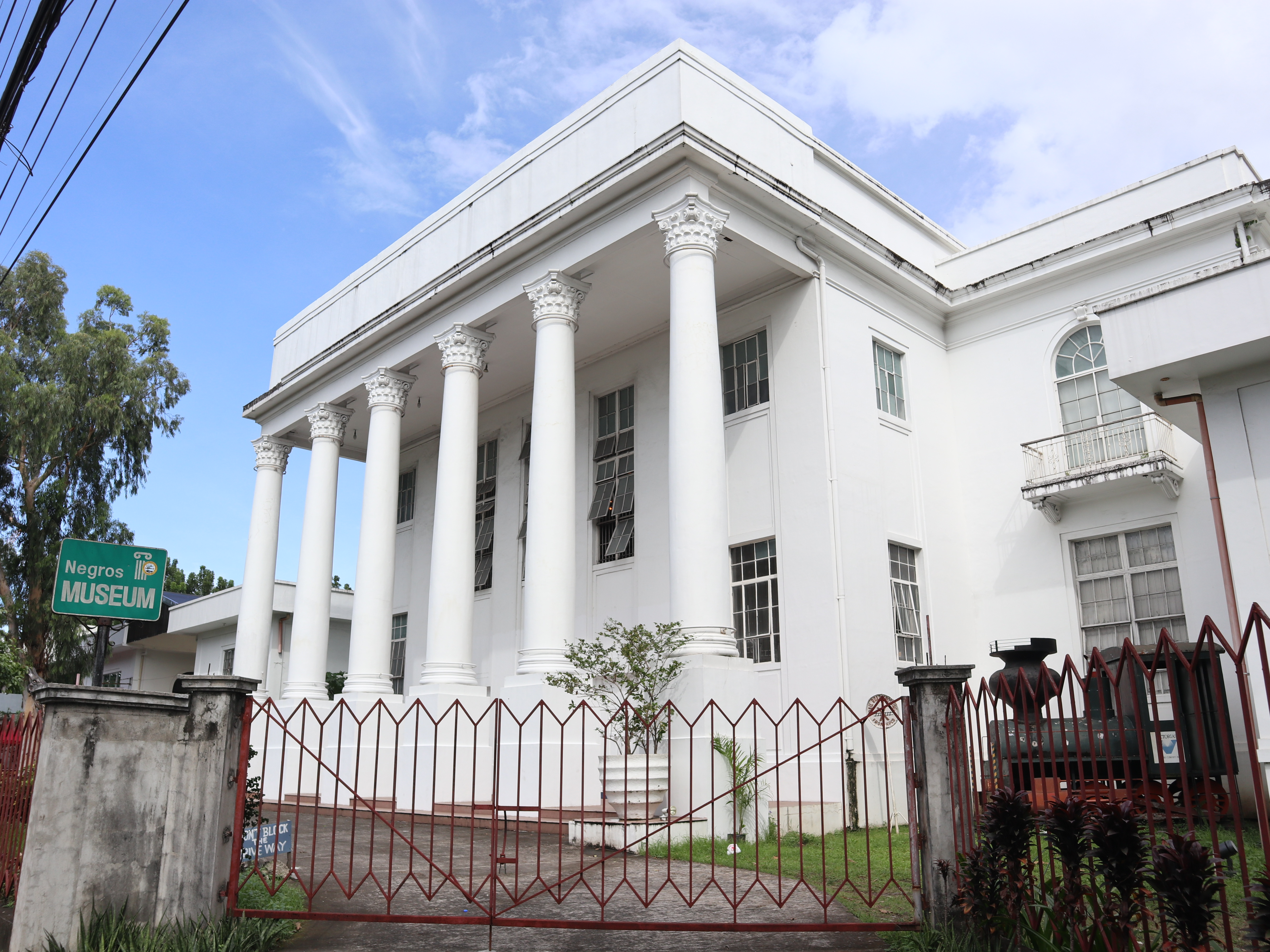
- Established: March 16, 1996
- Location: Provincial Capitol (1996-2003); Provincial Agriculture Building (2003-present)
- Coordinates: 10°40′36″N 122°57′03″E
- Type: Local museum
- Owner: Provincial Government of Negros Occidental (building)
- Website: negrosmuseum.blogspot.com
- Building details
- Location in the Visayas Location in the Philippines
- Alternative names: Provincial Agriculture Building (building occupied by the museum)

General information
- Status: Completed
- Architectural style: Neoclassical, Art Deco
- Location: Gatuslao St., Negros Occidental Provincial Capitol Complex, Bacolod, Philippines
- Current tenants: Negros Cultural Foundation (museum management; since 2003)
- Construction started: 1925
- Renovated: 2003
- Owner: Provincial Government of Negros Occidental (building)

Design and construction
- Architect: Juan Arellano
- Architecture firm: Bureau of Public Works

Negros Museum is a privately owned provincial museum situated in the Negros Occidental Provincial Capitol Complex in Bacolod, Philippines. The structure was built in 1925 as the Provincial Agriculture Building.

== History ==
Opened on March 17, 1996, the museum is formerly housed in the Provincial Capitol, which was reverted for government use 2003. Since then, the exhibits have been transferred to the former Provincial Agriculture Building. As a courtesy payment, Negros Cultural Foundation, the management running the Negros Museum, currently pays the Provincial Government a rent of ₱1 only, for minimum compliance under law.

== Exhibits ==
The museum is the first in its kind to not house precious archaeological artifacts, but rather was designed to display Negrense lifestyle and society, which includes old furnishings and loaned items from ancestral houses. It also includes art exhibits and expositions from different local artists and foreign artists resident in Negros Island Region. Art training and seminars are also conducted inside the museum.

== Museum cafe ==
Negros Museum Cafe serves the needs of museum goers and walk-in guests, situated in the West Annex of the museum. It includes a separate entrance, which includes an open-air and an in-house station occasionally used for small theater plays and art exhibitions.
