= Capitol Park and Lagoon =

Park in Negros Island Region, Philippines

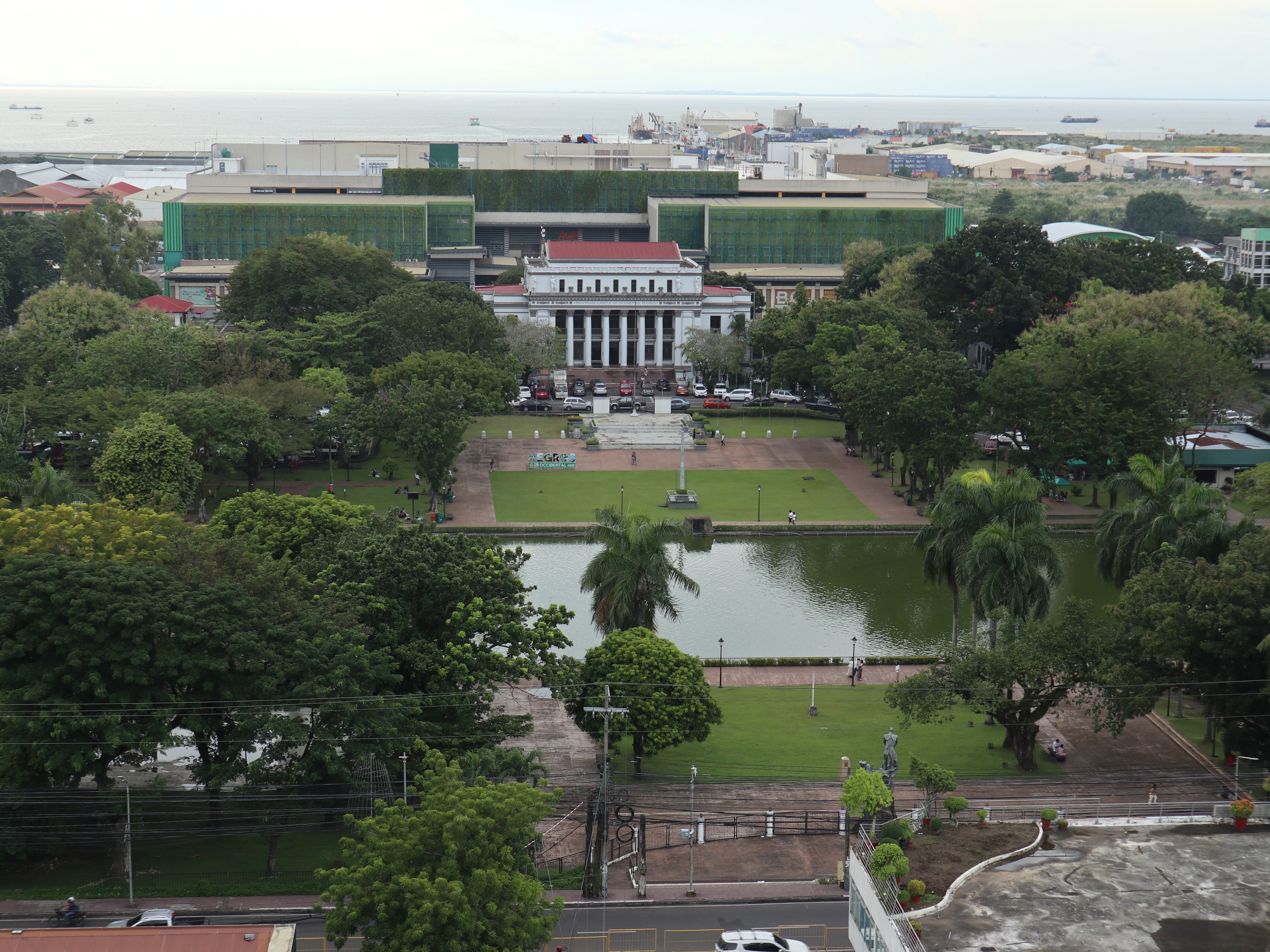

- Location within Philippines
- Interactive map of Capitol Park and Lagoon
- Type: Park and Man-made Lagoon
- Location: Bacolod, Negros Occidental
- Coordinates: 10°40′34″N 122°57′06″E
- Area: 3 ha (7.4 acres)
- Operator: Negros Occidental Provincial Government
- Open: All year

The Capitol Park and Lagoon is a provincial park located in Bacolod, Negros Occidental, in the Philippines. One of the features of the park are matching sculptures depicting a woman standing alongside a water buffalo and that of a man pulling another water buffalo. These sculptures are located at the northern and southern ends of the lagoon. These figures were executed by Italian sculpture Francesco Riccardo Monti who also did the sculptures of the Metropolitan Manila Theater and the University of the Philippines - Visayas Iloilo campus. Guillermo Tolentino also contributed as a sculptor of the figures.

== Attractions and landmarks ==
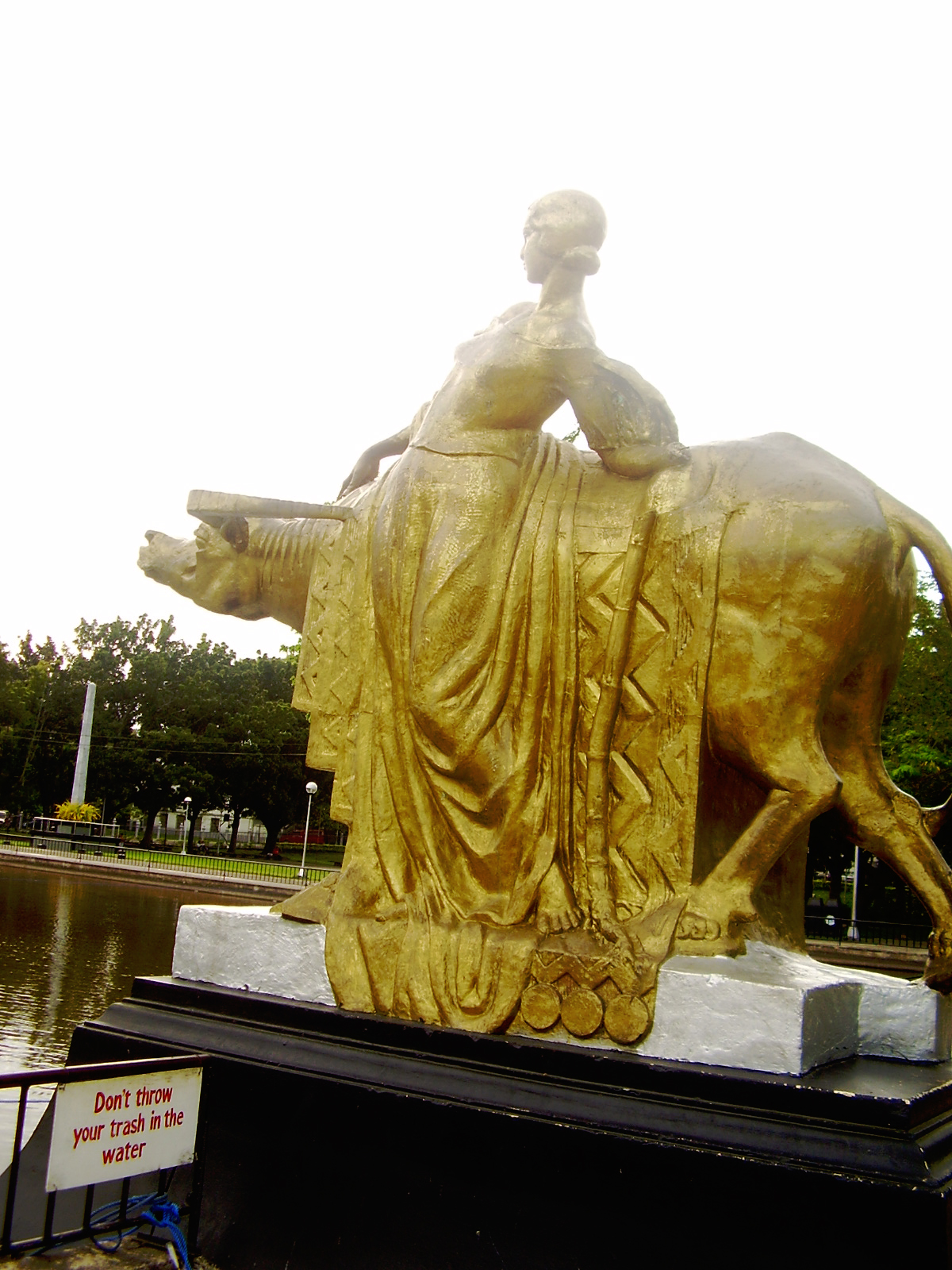
Figure of a woman and water buffalo on the southern end of the lagoon

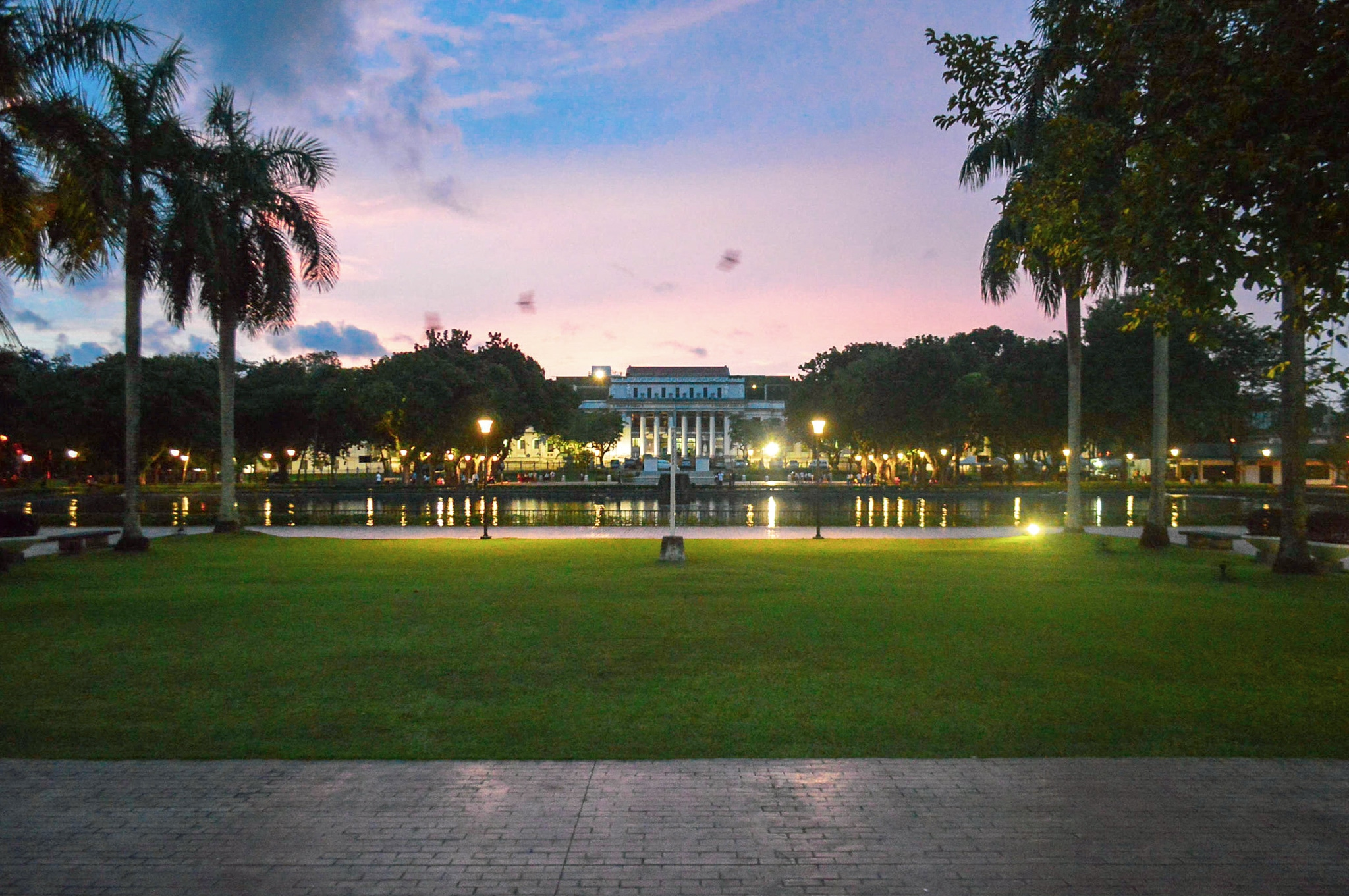
Capitol Park and Lagoon landscape

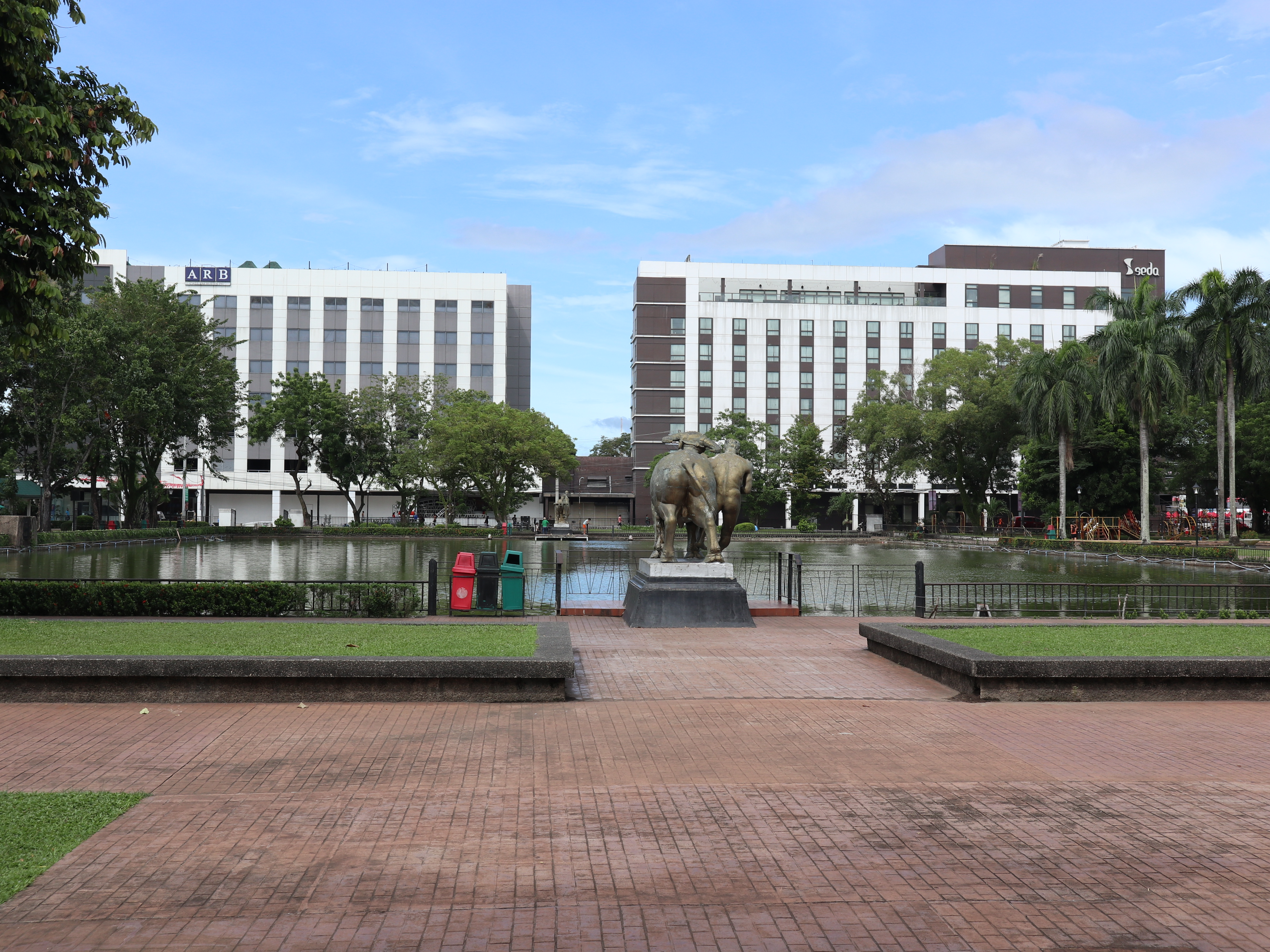
View of ARB Call Facilities and Seda Hotel Bacolod from the Capitol Park and Lagoon

Popular activities at the park include jogging, aerobics, school dance rehearsals, promenading, Arnis and martial arts practice and feeding the tilapias of the lagoon.

The main landmark in the park is the Negros Occidental Provincial Capitol building. It is the official seat of the Governor of the province. Different government offices of the province serving its thirteen cities and municipalities are also located in the vicinity of the park.

The first Panaad sa Negros Festival, also known as the Panaad Festival, was held here in a three-day affair in 1993 that began April 30. The festival was held at the Capitol Park and Lagoon fronting the Provincial Capitol for the first four years. As the festival grew each year, it became necessary to look for a more spacious venue. In 1997, the festival was held at the reclaimed area near the Bredco Port. The construction of the Panaad Stadium and sports complex paved the way for the establishment of the Panaad Park as the permanent home of the festival.

The park today has become a popular spot for local families to hold picnics on Sundays and holidays and a major tourist attraction of Negros. A man-made lake or lagoon in the middle of the park contains live tilapia fish. The park has recreational value as well, as bands, orchestras and other forms of entertainment are provided for free in its open-air auditorium in events aptly called "Concert at the Park".

== See also ==
- Capitol Central
- Bacolod Public Plaza
- Fountain of Justice
- Rizal Park
- Paco Park
