= Fountain of Justice =

Historic monument in Bacolod, Negros Occidental, Philippines

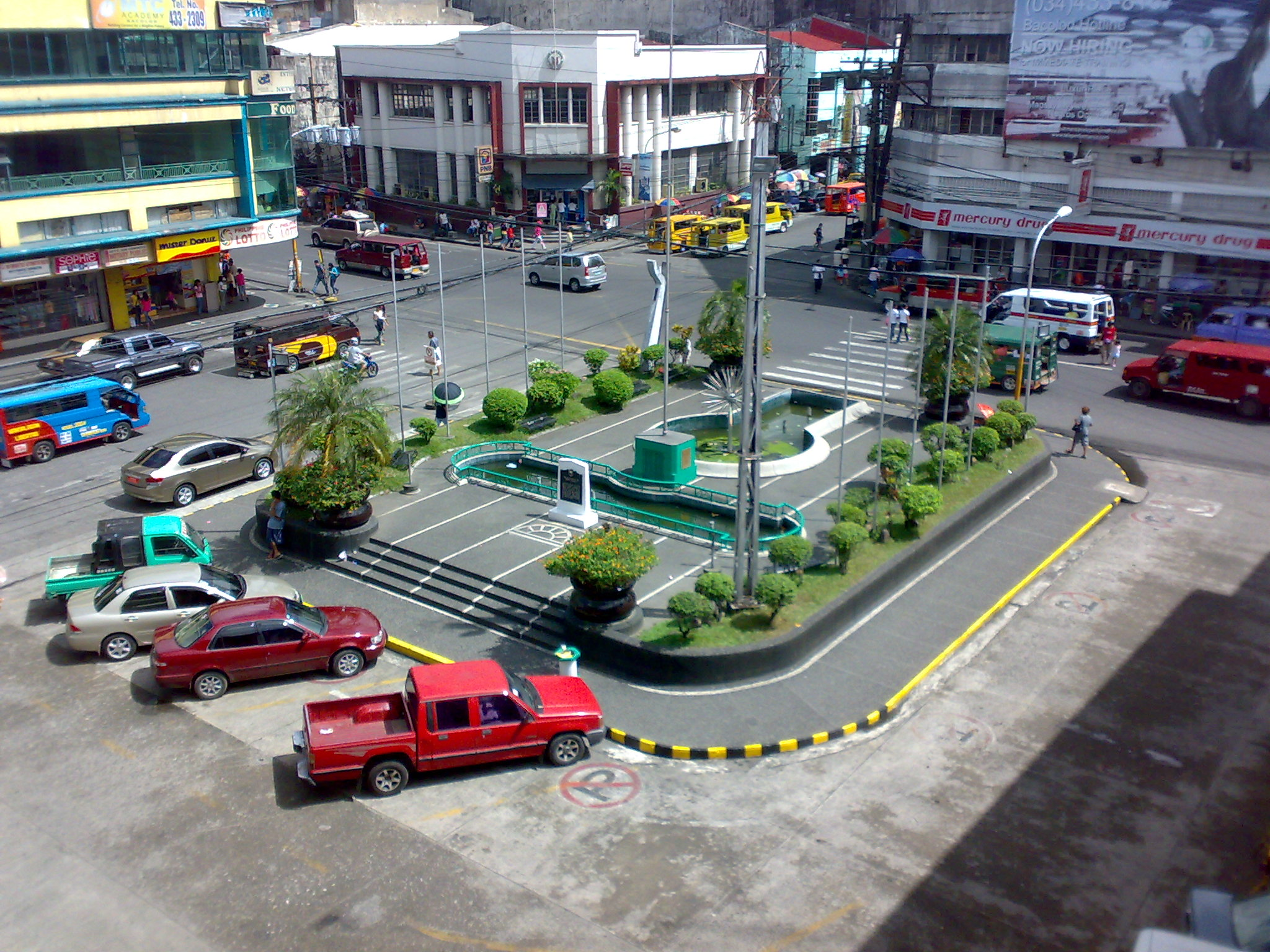
- View of the Fountain of Justice from a high point in the old Bacolod City Hall building
- Interactive map of Fountain of Justice
- Type: Fountain and plaza
- Location: In front of the old city hall of Bacolod
- Coordinates: 10.6676°N 122.9454°E
- Area: 400 m^{2} (4,300 sq ft)
- Operator: Bacolod Government
- Open: All year

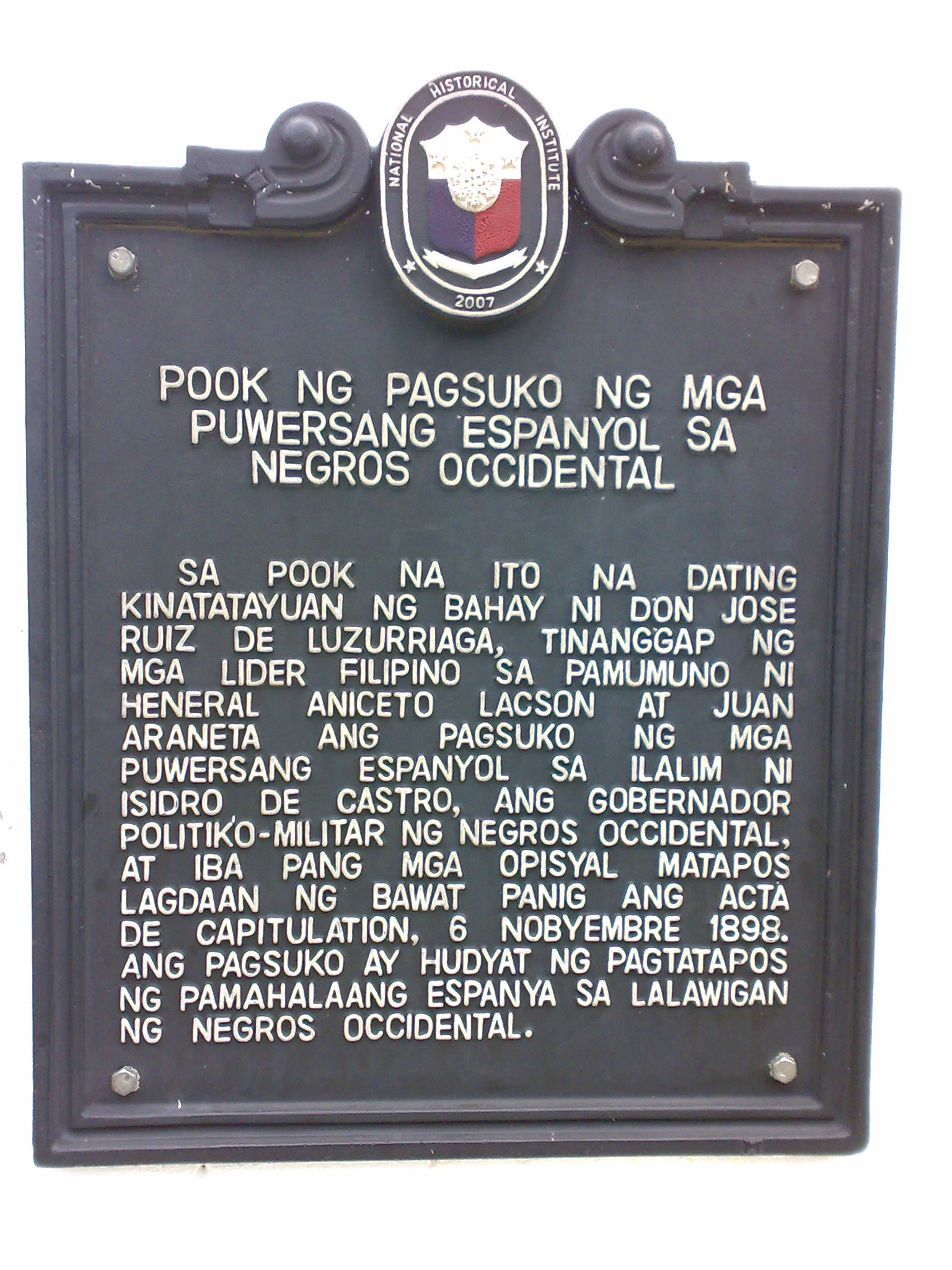
Historical marker commemorating the surrender of Spanish forces in Negros in 1898

The Fountain of Justice is a historic landmark in Bacolod, Negros Occidental, Philippines. It marks the location where the house of Jose Ruiz de Luzurriaga used to stand. It was in this house that the surrender of Bacolod by Spanish authorities to the Filipino forces of General Aniceto Lacson took place on November 6, 1898, during the Negros Revolution. Luzurriaga acted as mediator between the two belligerents. Colonel Isidro de Castro, Spanish governor of Negros, signed the surrender document on behalf of the Spanish forces. The landmark now lies in front of the old Bacolod City Hall.

The plaza and fountain area is also a place for recreation, political, spiritual and cultural activities and is illuminated at night. The fountain is a meeting place for rallies and protesters of many organizations, private, public and labor movements and political sectors. The fountain was the site of the celebration of the 66th Charter Anniversary of Bacolod City.

== See also ==
- Gen. Aniceto Lacson
- Negros Revolution
- Republic of Negros
- Negros Occidental Provincial Capitol
- Capitol Park and Lagoon
- Capitol Central
- Bacolod Public Plaza
