= Capitol Central =

Place in Bacolod, Philippines

Capitol Central Estate

Project
- Opening date: 2014; 12 years ago
- Developer: Makati Development Corporation
- Operator: Ayala Property Management Corporation
- Owner: Ayala Land
- Website: https://www.ayalaland.com.ph/estate/capitol-central/

Location
- Interactive map of Capitol Central
- Coordinates: 10°40′35.7″N 122°57′1.2″E
- Country: Philippines
- Province: Negros Occidental
- City: Bacolod

Capitol Central, previously called the Negros Occidental Provincial Capitol Complex, is a government complex and mixed-use estate centered around the Negros Occidental Provincial Capitol, currently co-managed with Ayala Land. Certain portions are leased or sold to Ayala Land, as part of their industrial estate in Bacolod, Philippines.

== Location ==
Capitol Central is bounded by 12th Street to the north, extending towards Lacson Street on the eastern portion. The property is directly fronting the Bacolod Capitol Shopping Center, renamed as the Bacolod Chinatown. Towards the south is Burgos Street, stretching from Lacson Street to San Juan Street and the North Capitol Roads, including the Old Pala Pala Seafoods Market.

== Facilities ==
Capitol Central contains the Negros Occidental Provincial Capitol at the core, along with the adjacent Provincial Administrative Center (PAC) and the Kadiwa Center, housing the Provincial Cooperative Office and a hostel. Negros Museum currently occupies the renovated former Agriculture Building, beside the Commission on Audit Regional Office. The Hall of Justice, Philippine Postal Corporation and the Negros Occidental Chapter of the Boy Scouts of the Philippines also occupies a gated compound.

Banking facilities also hold their regional offices in the complex, which includes Landbank of the Philippines, Veteran's Bank, Development Bank of the Philippines and the Philippine National Bank. The 7-storey PNB Center was recently renovated to house provincial government and regional offices, while renovations are ongoing for the PAC and Kadiwa Center.

Formerly, Fort San Juan (also known as the Negros Occidental Provincial Jail) occupied the outskirts and has been replaced by a mall complex, an extension of the earlier 888 Chinatown Mall. The jail complex was transferred to nearby Bago City, with the neighboring National Food Authority also planned to be vacated, as part of the Ayala development, and will also be located in a new complex to be constructed near the jail. Corazon Locsin Memorial Regional Hospital, the former provincial hospital, occupies southeastern portion of the property, adjacent to the University of St. La Salle College of Nursing. Meanwhile, the Negros Forest Ecological Foundation, Inc. occupying the lot between DBP and COA is planning to transfer its facilities in Panaad Park and Stadium and the township of Mambukal.

The Department of Agriculture, Department of Science and Technology, Department of Health, and the National Telecommunications Commission regional offices for Negros Island Region, occupies rented spaces near the capitol. National Bureau of Investigation shares office spaces with the Department of Justice NIR regional office.

== Mall ==
Ayala Malls Capitol Central

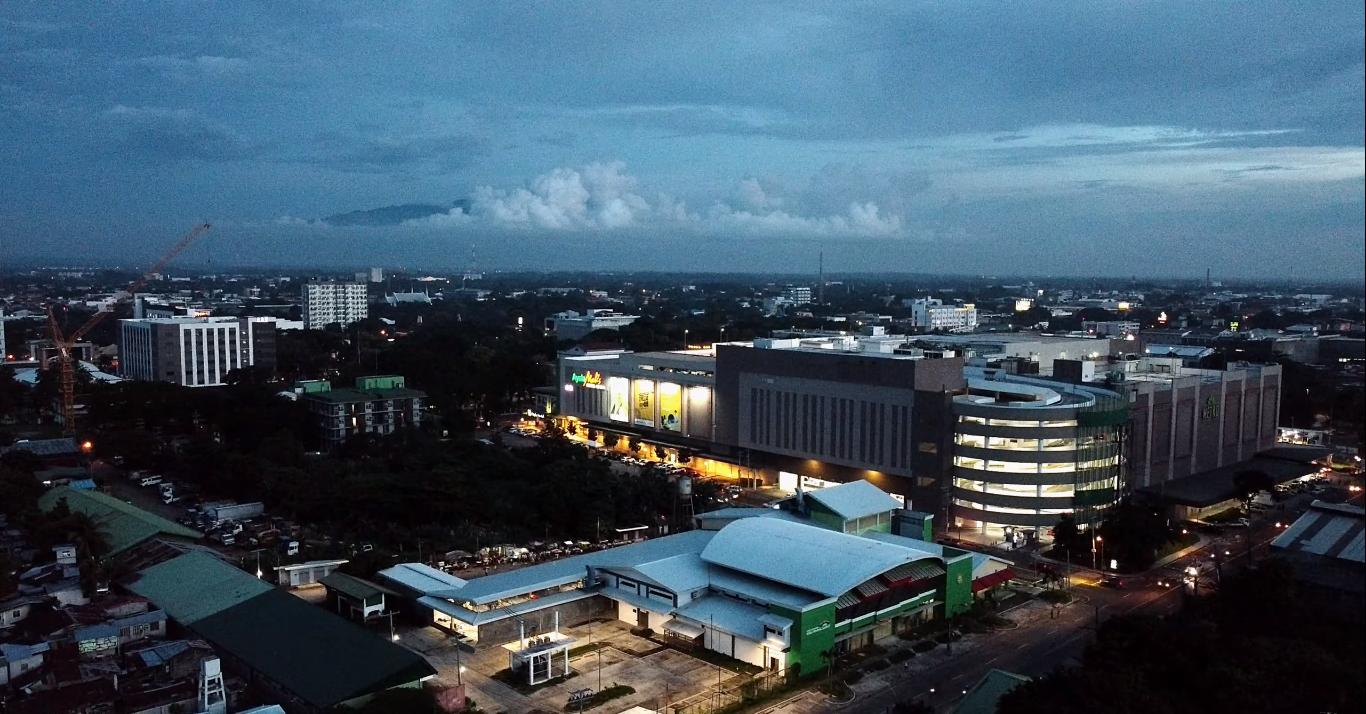
- Ayala Malls Capitol Central in the background
- Address: Gatuslao Street, Bacolod, Negros Occidental, Philippines
- Opened: December 14, 2018; 7 years ago
- Developer: Ayala Malls
- Manager: Ayala Malls
- Floor area: 70,000 m^{2} (750,000 sq ft)
- Floors: 4 + 2 parking levels

Interior of Ayala Malls Capitol Central

Ayala Malls Capitol Central is a shopping mall developed and managed by Ayala Malls located within the Capitol Central estate. This is Ayala Malls' second mall in Negros Occidental after The District – North Point in Talisay, and its first regional mall in Western Visayas. The mall is located behind the Provincial Capitol building. It also features the second SPACE exhibition branch, which features two function halls, known as the Central Hall, and four meeting rooms.

== Other infrastructure ==
As part of the Deed of Sale and Memorandum of Agreement, Capitol Central covers 7.7 hectares (19 acres) of provincial government property. 4.04 hectares (10.0 acres) are under lease for 50 years, with a yearly rent of ₱106 million and subject to renewal, while the remaining 3.6 hectares (8.9 acres) are now owned by Ayala Land.

Amaia Steps Capitol Central is currently under construction, to house 550 residential units, located at the rear portion of the property near the Bacolod Real Estate Development Corporation (BREDCO) reclamation facility. While part of Capitol Central, Amaia Steps was purchased from a private land owner. At the heart of Ayala's development is Ayala Malls Capitol Central, located behind the Provincial Capitol. Leasable area is projected to be up to 70,000 square metres (750,000 sq ft) and would include events and convention facilities, a mall and office spaces.

The historic Capitol Park and Lagoon will also be renovated, in lieu of soon to be constructed 155-room Seda Hotel Capitol Central across it. In lieu of this, the Negros Cooperative Bank holding office inside the park will be relocated to the Negros First Cyber Center. A four-storey office spaces named the "Capitol Corporate Center" will be built to augment provincial government offices and house BPO facilities.

== Controversy ==
SM Prime Holdings (SMPH) earlier stated their interest on the property, planning a ₱2.5 billion investment on a convention center facility. The proposal also includes commercial and office facilities. Hans Sy, the president of SM Prime Holdings, met with Gov. Alfredo Maranon on May 11, 2011 to submit his proposal. However, they lost the bid to Ayala Land a month after on June 11, 2011. A failure of bidding was declared previously on July 7, 2011, since only Ayala and SMPH showed up, Robinsons Land backed out.

On April 13, 2012, in a disclosure to the Philippine Stock Exchange, previously noted that they were backing out of the deal, due to the complexities of the case and the initial disapproval of the Commission on Audit. Finally, the lease and acquisition gained COA approval on September 21, 2012. Due to the development, Ayala Land rekindled their project on September 10, 2013, after talks with representatives of the Provincial Government of Negros Occidental.

The case was dismissed by both the Regional Trial Court Branch 50 in Bacolod and the Court of Appeals in Cebu City.

== See also ==
- Negros Occidental Provincial Capitol
- Capitol Park and Lagoon
- Bacolod Public Plaza
- Fountain of Justice
