= Bacolod Public Plaza =

Plaza del Seis de Noviembre Bacolod Public Plaza
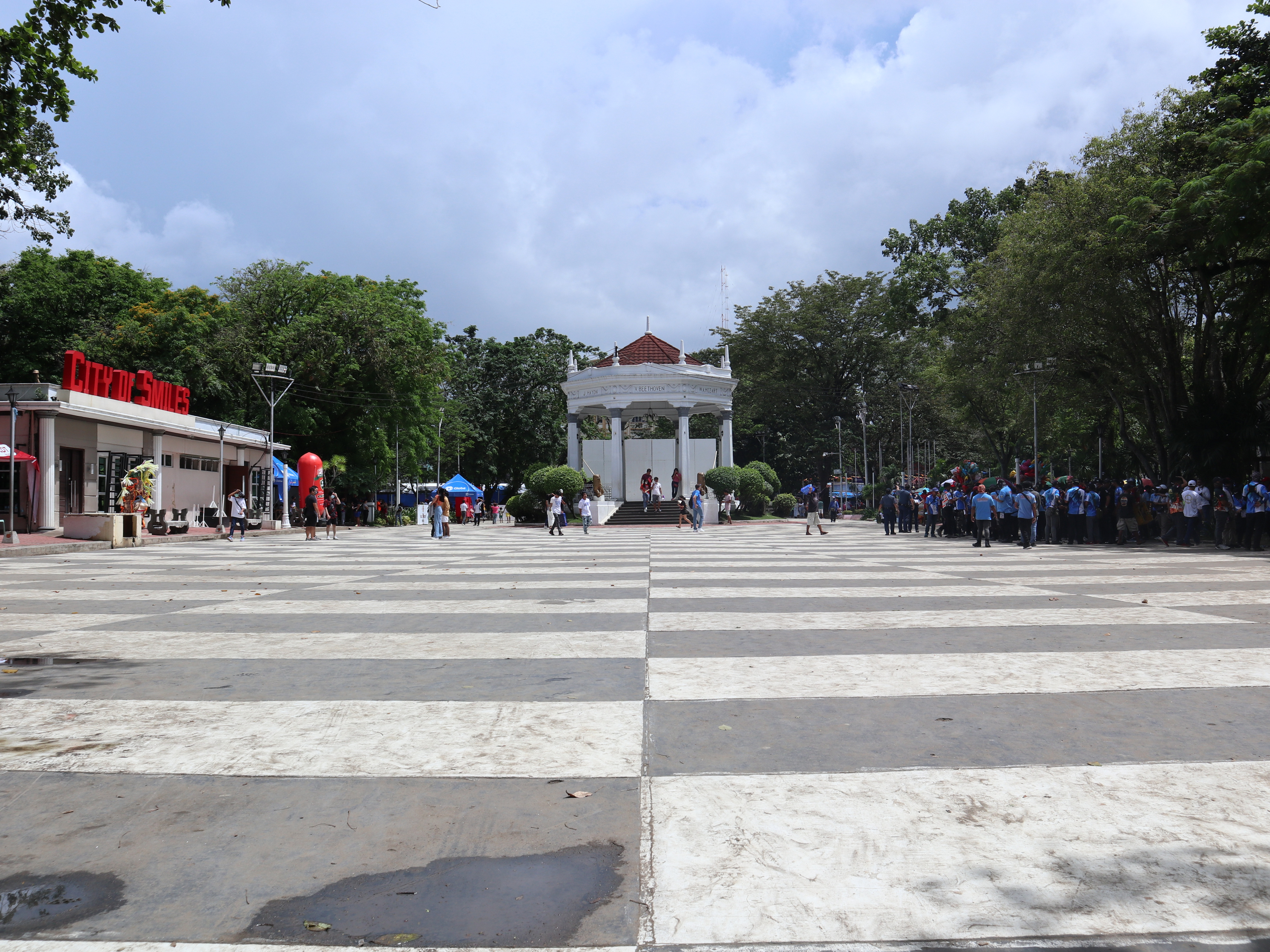
- The Bacolod Public Plaza showing the gazebo at the center

- Location within Philippines
- Interactive map of Plaza del Seis de Noviembre; Bacolod Public Plaza
- Type: Park and Man-made Lagoon
- Location: Bacolod, Negros Occidental
- Coordinates: 10°40′34″N 122°57′06″E
- Area: 2 hectares (4.9 acres)
- Operator: City Government of Bacolod, Diocese of Bacolod
- Open: 1927 (officially organized)

The Bacolod Public Plaza, officially the Plaza del 6 de Noviembre, named after the day of the Spanish surrender of Negros Island to the Negros revolutionaries, is one of the notable landmarks of Bacolod, the capital of Negros Occidental, Philippines. It is located in the heart of the downtown area, near the old city hall and across from the San Sebastian Cathedral. The plaza is a trapezoidal park with a belt of trees around the periphery and a gazebo at the center. Scattered within the trees are four circular fountains.

== History ==
Public plaza arch

When Bacolod was declared as the capital of Negros Island in 1846, the Spanish Colonial Government in Negros set to work in creating a public plaza fronting the current Banco de Oro branch, which used to be the "Casa Real" or the official residence of the Spanish governor. However, the plaza was too small to be constituted that Don Jose Vicente Locsin Gonzaga donated a portion of his property to expand the plaza. These two lots continue to be owned by the City Government of Bacolod, while the other half was only added when the extension of Rizal Street towards San Juan Street cut off a portion of the churchyard of San Sebastian Cathedral.

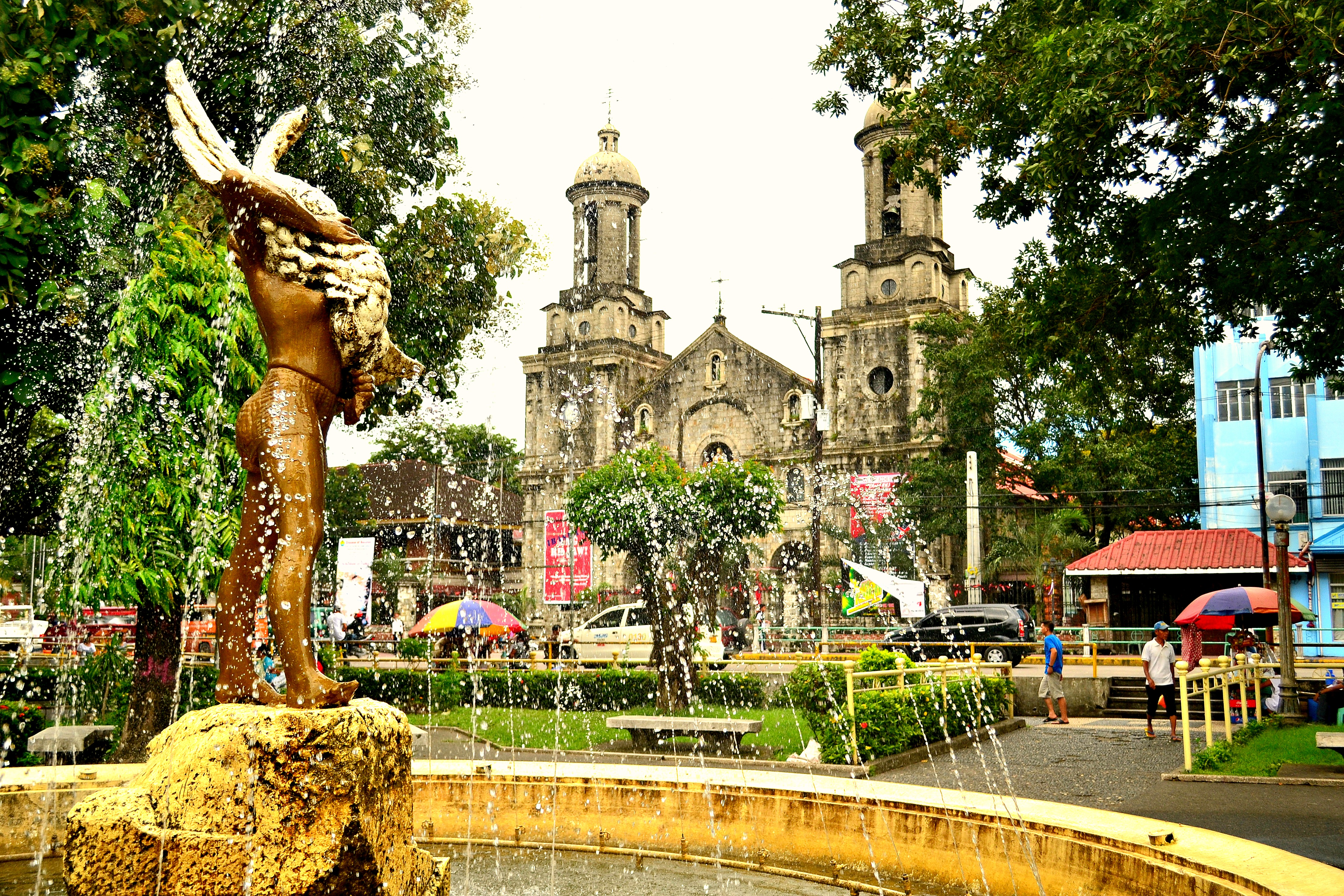
A view of the San Sebastian Cathedral (at the background) taken from the Bacolod Public Plaza

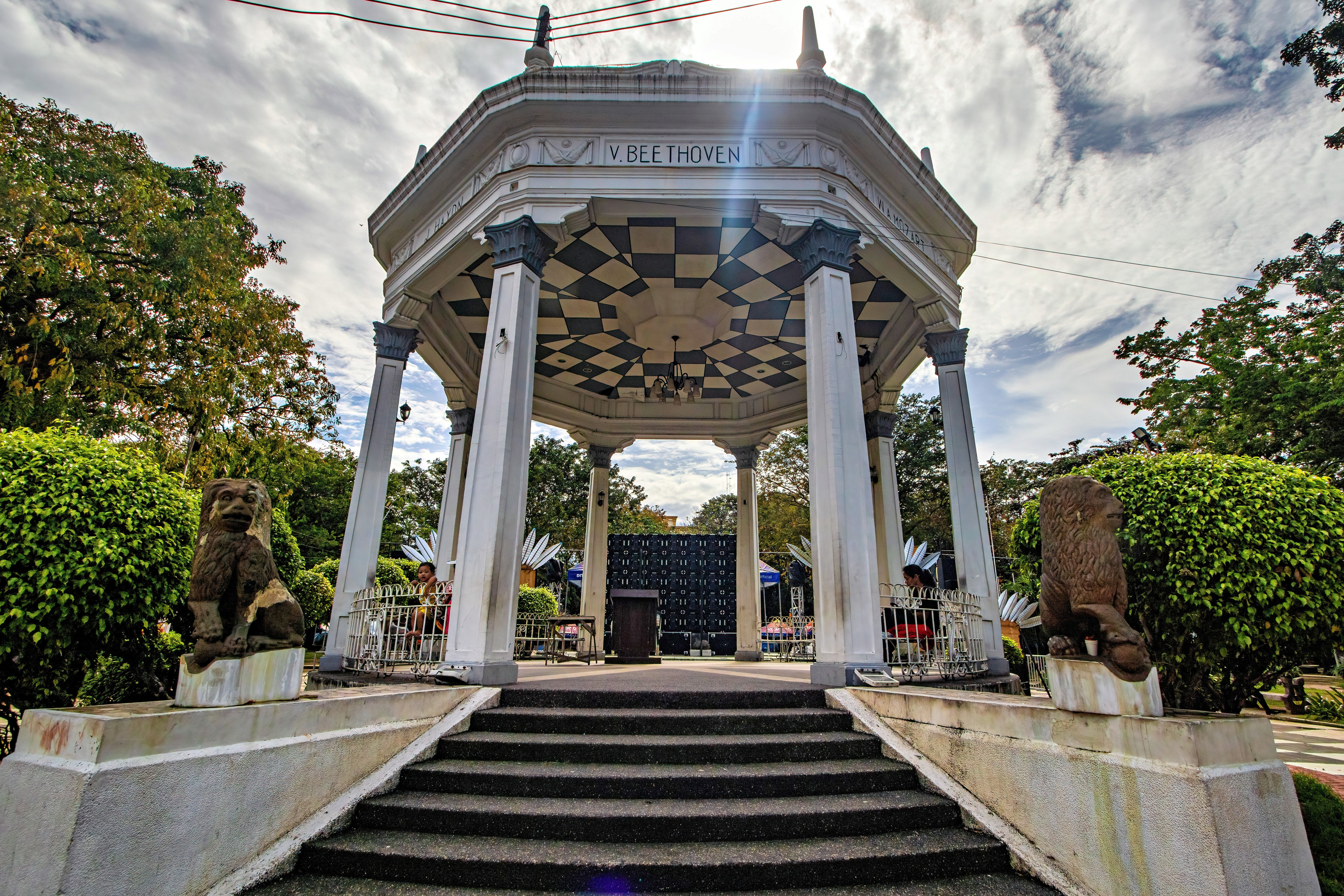
The Gazebo in Bacolod City Plaza

His Excellency James McCloskey, Bishop of Jaro, which Bacolod previously belonged, in behalf of Monsignor Maurice Foley, the parish priest of Bacolod, granted a perpetual usufruct to the Municipal Government of Bacolod for the management of the property cut off from San Sebastian, on March 22, 1922. The gazebo/bandstand was constructed in 1926 and inaugurated in 1927, as part of the plaza's reorganization to its current form as a place for recreation, political, spiritual and cultural activities. The bandstand is inscribed along the sides of the roof with the names of Western classical music composers Beethoven, Wagner, Haydn, and Mozart.

== Festival ==
The plaza is the heart of the MassKara Festival celebration. The MassKara Festival is a month-Cebration held each year in Bacolod Every 4th weekend of October, The Bacolod public plaza used to be the final destination of MassKara street dancing competition which is the highlight of the celebration.

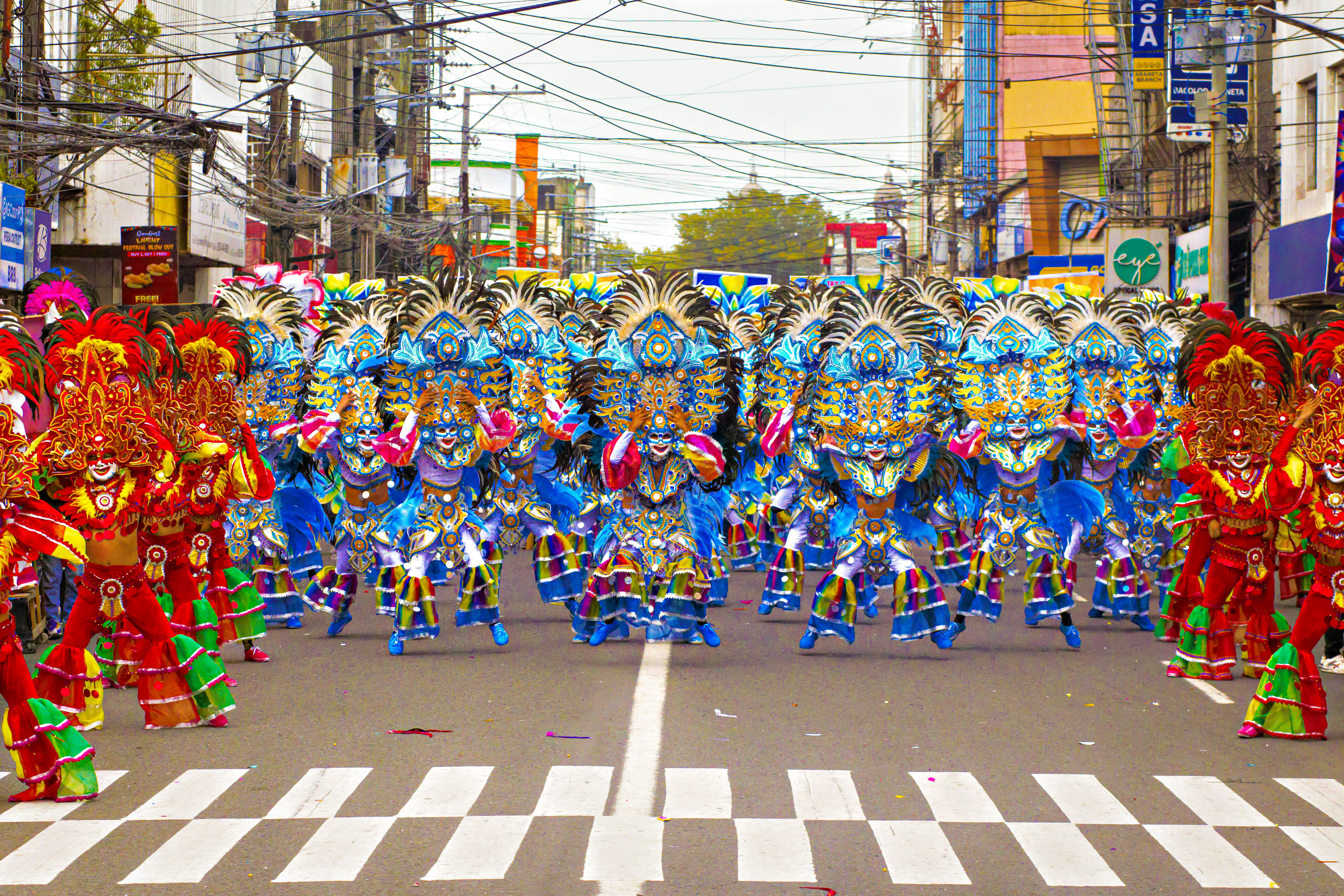
Masskara Festival

== See also ==
- Negros Occidental Provincial Capitol
- Capitol Park and Lagoon
- Capitol Central
- Fountain of Justice
