= Mambukal =

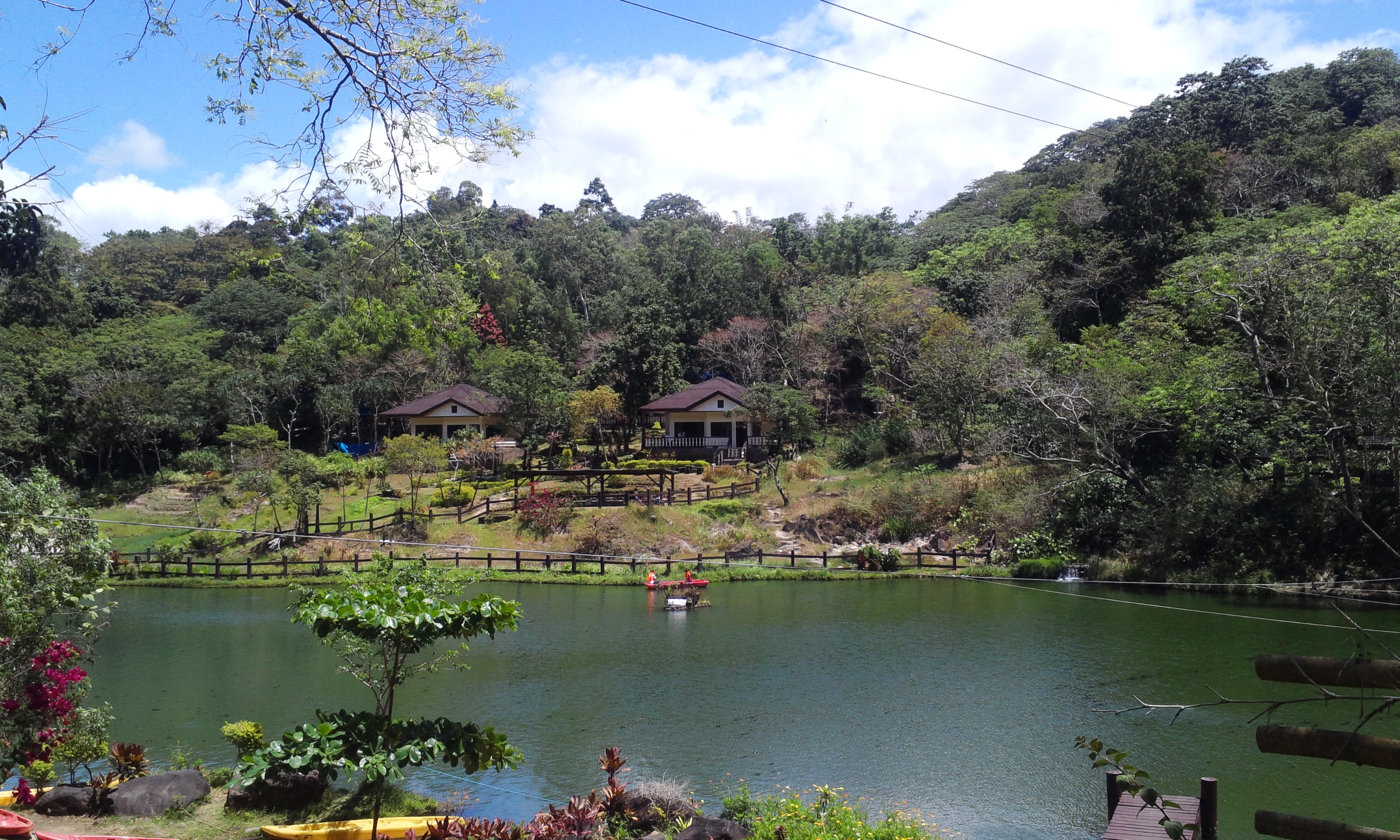
- Mambukal Lake

- Seal
- Nickname: "Mambukal Mountain Resort"
- Location within the Philippines
- Coordinates: 10°30′N 123°6.12′E
- Country: Philippines
- Region: Negros Island Region
- Province: Negros Occidental
- Municipality: Murcia
- Founded: July 22, 1957 (townsite)

Government
  - Governor: Eugenio Jose V. Lacson
  - Manager: Ellen Marie Jalandoni

Area
  - Total: 0.32 km^{2} (0.12 sq mi)
- Elevation: 365 m (1,198 ft)
- Time zone: UTC+8 (PST)
- ZIP code: 6129
- Dialing code: +63 (0)34
- Website: mambukalresort.negros-occ.gov.ph

Mambukal Resort, officially the Township of Mambukal and simply known as Mambukal (alternatively spelled as "Mambucal"), is a resort township located within the boundaries of the municipality of Murcia, Negros Occidental. As a township, it is directly governed by the Provincial Government of Negros Occidental, which also manages Mambukal Mountain Resort in the 6-hectare townsite near Barangay Minoyan. The resort is owned and managed by the Provincial Government of Negros Occidental under its Economic Enterprise Development Department.

== History ==
A hill station was established in the area in 1923, through a provincial administrative order, to serve as a weekend getaway for the officials of the Negros Occidental provincial government and its guests. The first permanent structure in the resort, the Ishiwata Bath House, was built in 1927, as part of developments made by the Japanese architect Kokichi Paul Ishiwata.

Republic Act No. 1964, signed by President Carlos P. Garcia on June 22, 1957, formally tasked the provincial government of Negros Occidental with the administration and management of the townsite and resort facilities. This date is commemorated in the annual Mudpack Festival, named after the medicinal sulfuric mud available in the area.

== Legal status ==
Mambukal is administered as a resort township, independent of the Municipality of Murcia by the provincial government, as the putative Township of Mambukal. However, this is disputed in some circles outside the province as townships, as a form of local government, were already abolished in 1919 through Philippine Legislature Act No. 2824. Legally, townships supposedly no longer constitute a local government unit under current laws, which only recognize four types of local government: province, city, municipality, and barangay.

== Geography ==
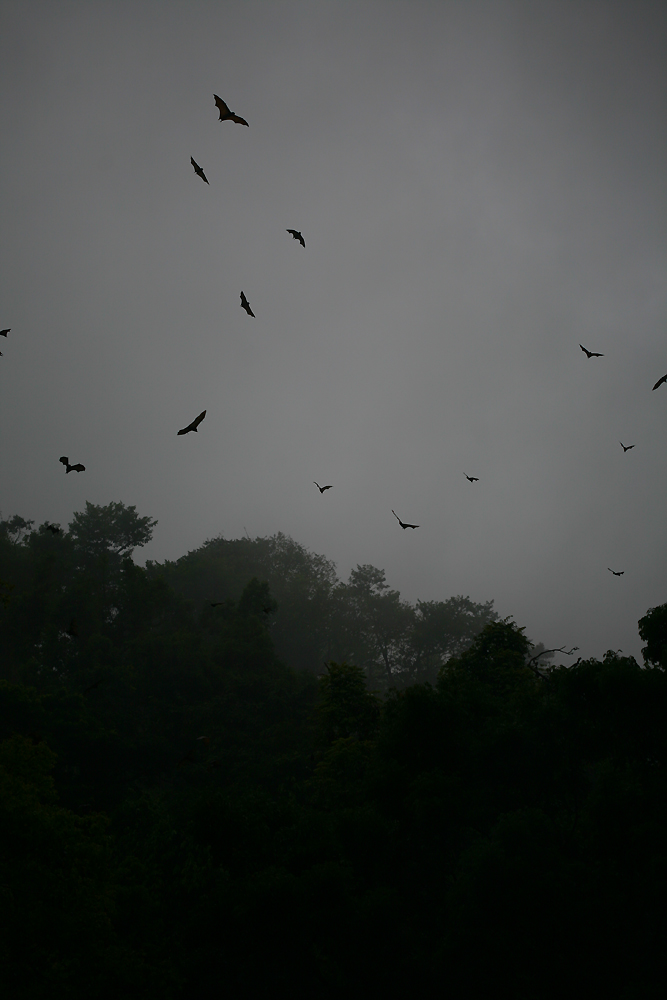
Large flying fox seen in Mambukal

=== Elevation ===
Situated 365 m (1,198 ft) above sea level and next to Mount Kanlaon, Mambukal enjoys cool temperatures all year round with access to flora and fauna native to the Kanlaon area. It covers an area of 23.6 hectares covering part of Mount Kanlaon Natural Park, a protected area which also encompasses territories of Murcia, La Castellana and Bago in Negros Occidental, and Canlaon in Negros Oriental.

=== Flora and Fauna ===
Mambukal is home to several species protected under Republic Act No. 9147. The endemic giant golden-crowned flying fox and the Philippine tube-nosed fruit bat can be seen in the area; these, along with other resident bat species, are estimated to number between 7,500 and 8,000. As part of the Mount Kanlaon Natural Park, Mambukal is also home to native civet populations and endemic animals such as the Visayan warty pig and the Negros bleeding-heart pigeon.

Located near the entrance is the Butterfly Garden, raising endemic butterflies for preservation and sale as decorative items.

== Amenities ==
=== Attractions ===
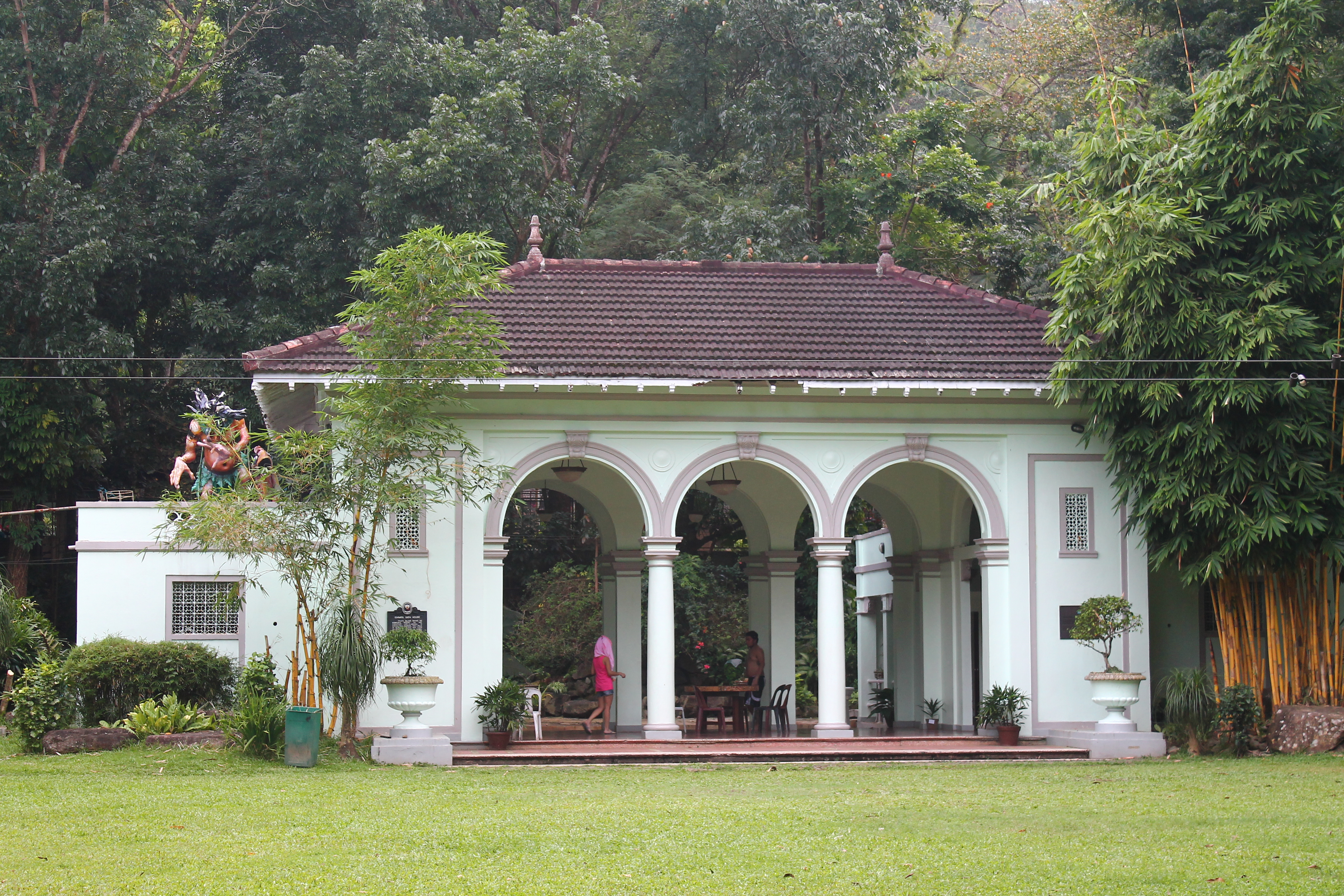
Ishiwata Bath House, Mambukal

Hot springs were the first attractions to draw visitors since the completion of the Ishiwata Bath House in 1927. It enjoys warm temperatures of up to 40 degrees Celsius in the pools, drawn from almost boiling sulfuric water within the facility. The area's seven waterfalls are situated on a well-tracked trail that attracts up to 320,000 visitors yearly, mostly from Negros and neighboring Panay, along with the resident Korean population of Bacolod sojourning every weekend and foreign tourists.

=== Facilities ===
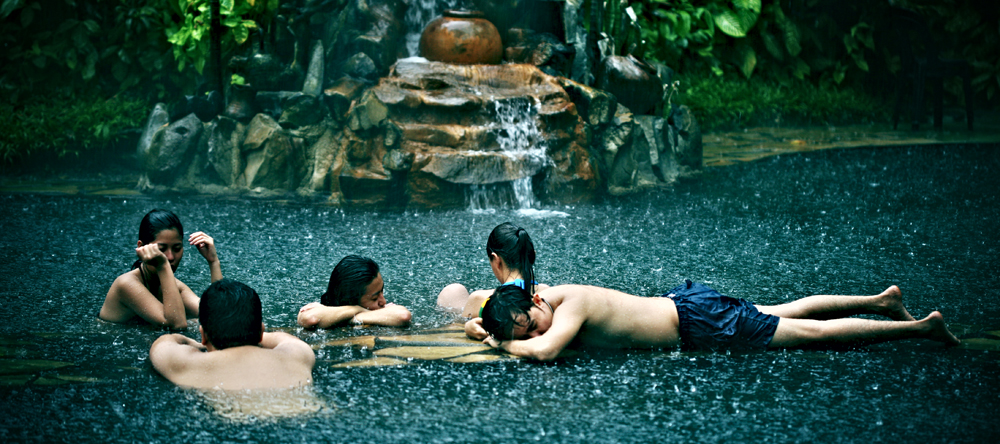
Natural swimming pool

Sulfur pools form the flagship attractions at Mambukal, with a public sulfur pool, the Japanese-constructed rotenburo and the Ishiwata Bath House forming the premier facility. It also includes two swimming pools and a boating lagoon, though bathing is generally allowed in the upper portions of the river and selected areas of the seven falls. Overnight accommodations area available at Mambukal, with 3 family cottages fronting the boating lagoon, 28 villas, 11 cottages, a tourist lodge and dormitory, along with a convention hall for meetings and conferences. Reservations can be made in the Provincial Tourism Office, at the Negros Occidental Provincial Capitol.

Located in an isolated portion of the resort is the Governor's Lodge, serving the needs of the Governor of Negros Occidental and has served in ceremonial capacity in the past for receiving dignitaries. A caregiving and retirement facility is slated to be built in its vicinity.

== Investment ==
Mambukal earned a total of P48.5 million in 2014, due to the surge of tourists from nearby Asian countries like South Korea and Japan, that funded the rotenburo facility. To improve tourism viability, the Provincial Government of Negros Occidental earmarked a budget of P500 million for improvements, constructions and renovations, including the P84 million Mambukal Mountain Resort Hotel and Convention Center, to replace its ageing inn facilities.

A mini-hydro power facility projected to generate sufficient electricity for the resort and its surrounding areas has been planned since 2008.

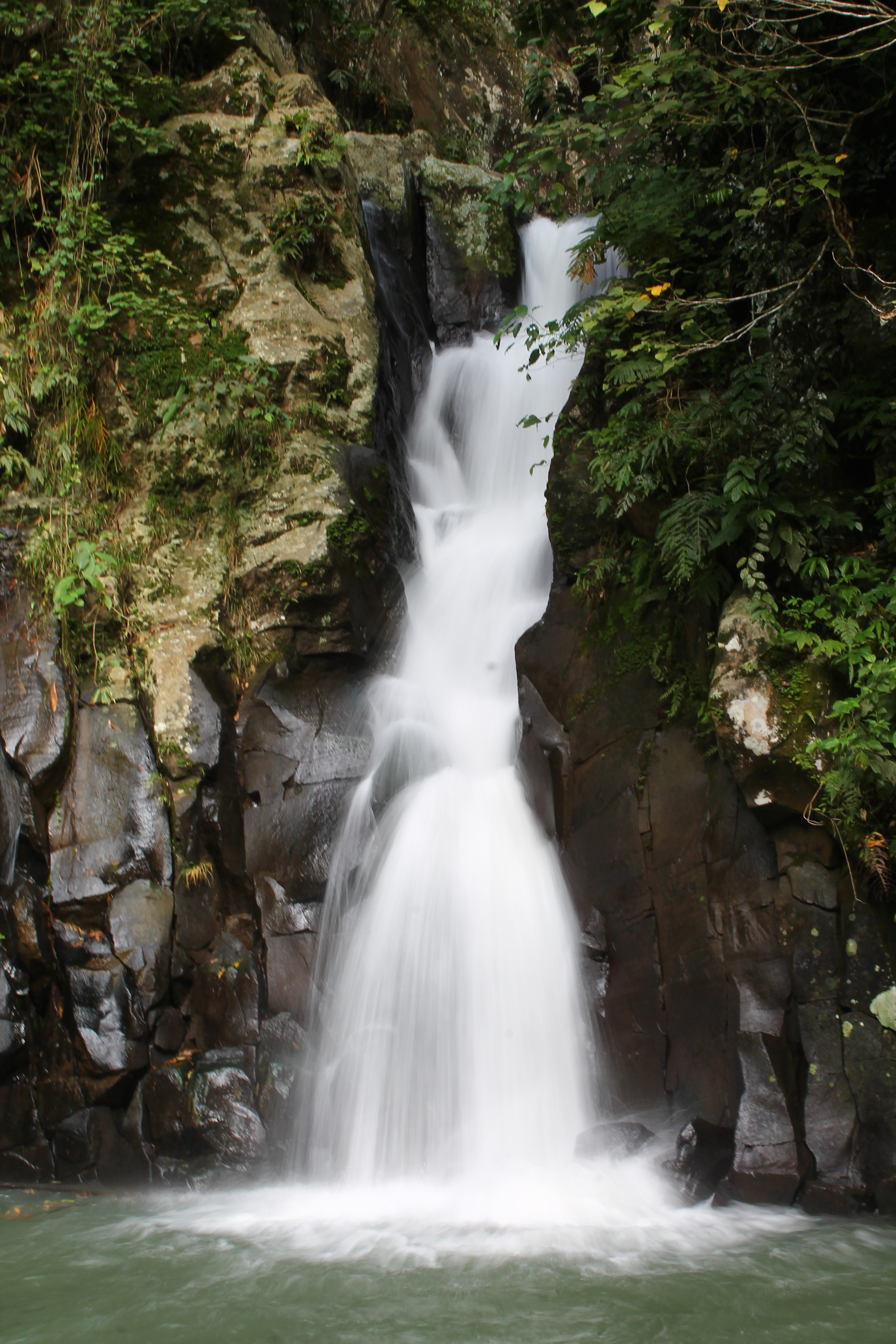
One of the seven falls in Mambukal

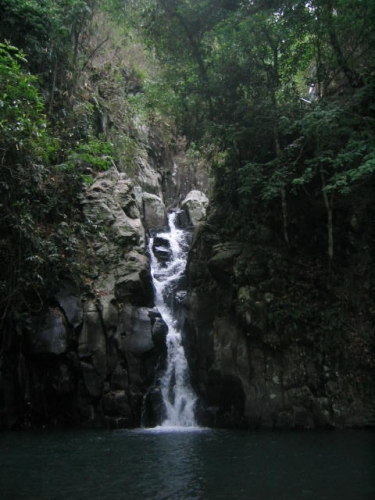
One of the seven falls in Mambukal

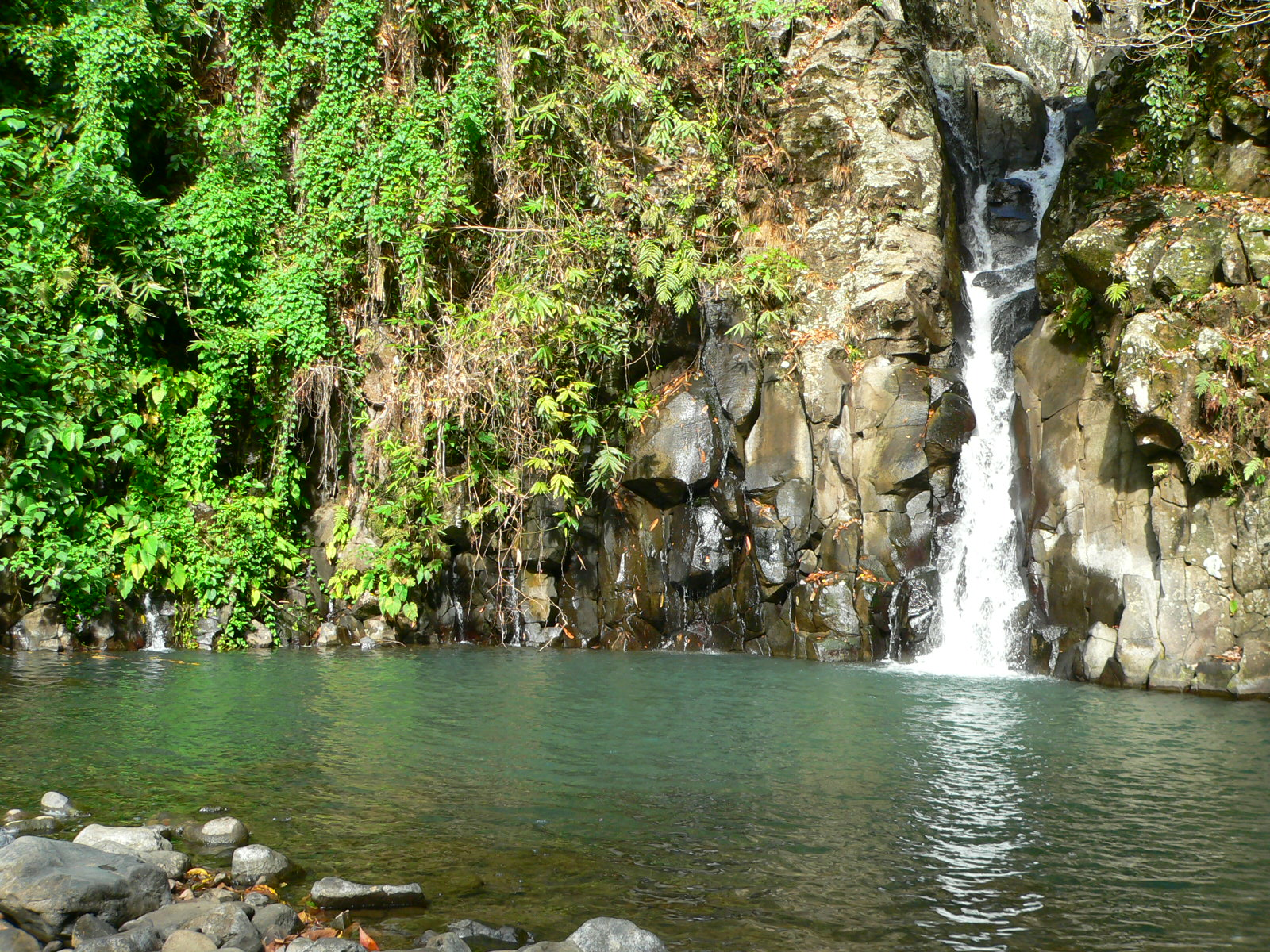
One of the seven falls in Mambukal

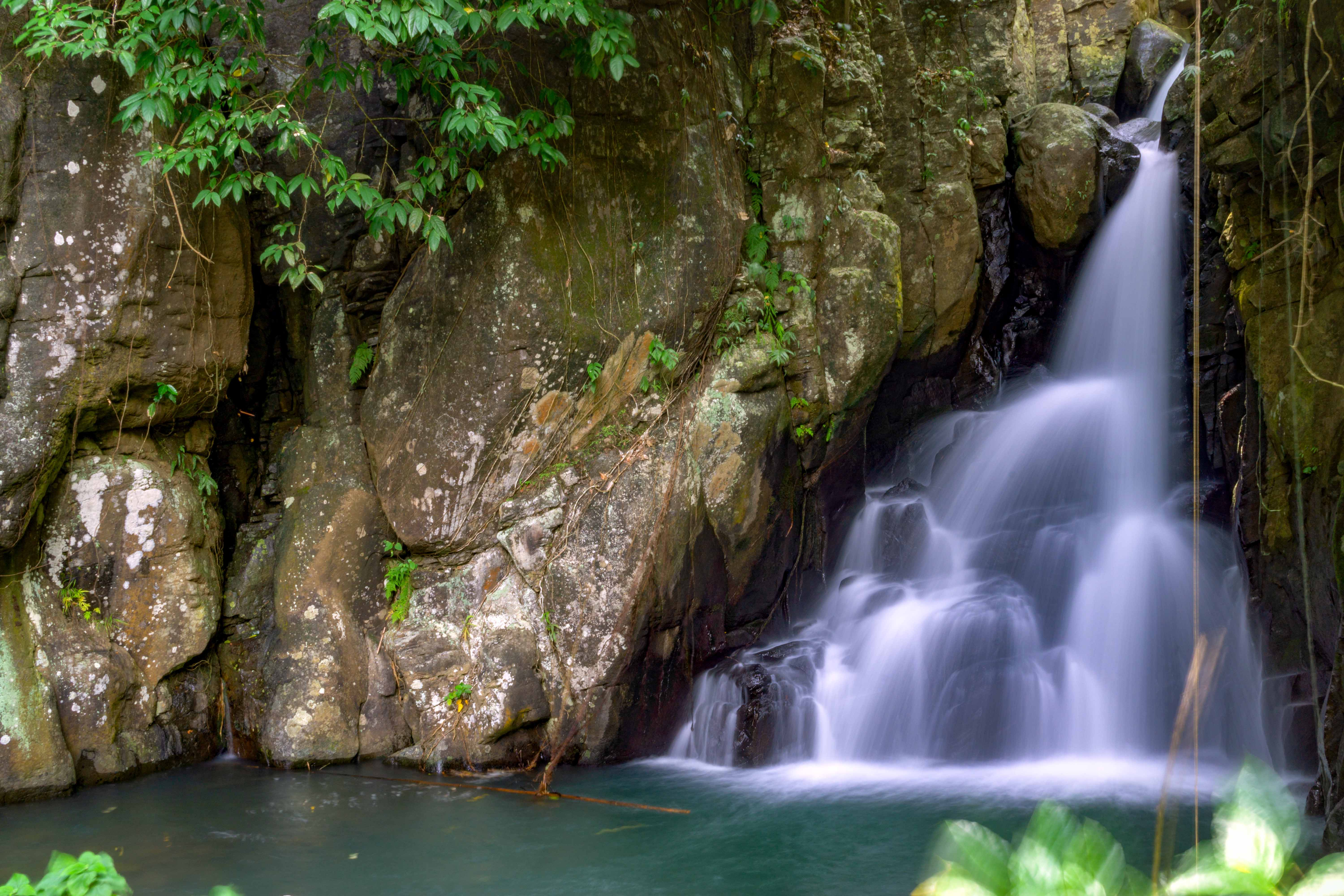
One of the seven falls in Mambukal

== See also ==
- Salvador Benedicto, Negros Occidental, provincial hill station and Summer Capital of Negros Occidental.
- Baguio, first hill station and Summer Capital of the Philippines.
