= Murcia, Negros Occidental =

Municipality in Negros Occidental, Philippines

Murcia
- Municipality
- Municipality of Murcia
- Murcia Municipal Building

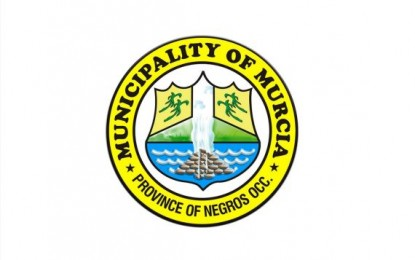
- Flag Seal

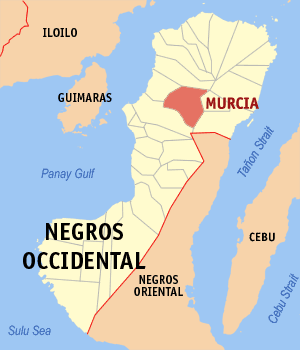
- Map of Negros Occidental with Murcia highlighted
- Interactive map of Murcia
- Location within the Philippines
- Coordinates: 10°36′N 123°02′E
- Country: Philippines
- Region: Negros Island Region
- Province: Negros Occidental
- District: 3rd district
- Named for: Murcia, Spain
- Barangays: 23 (see Barangays)

Government
  - Type: Sangguniang Bayan
  - Mayor: Victor Gerardo M. Rojas
  - Vice Mayor: Johnny P. Reosura (Lakas)
  - Representative: Javier Miguel L. Benitez (PFP)
  - Municipal Council: Members: Enegio C. Gravino, Jr.; Phillip S. Belleza; Carlito B. Yu, Jr.; Alfredo L. Villarosa; Joey R. Gomez; Belen E. Magbanua; Francoise O. Ginson; Hernan C. Alintana
  - Electorate: 56,755 voters (2025)

Area
  - Total: 279.14 km^{2} (107.78 sq mi)
- Elevation: 429 m (1,407 ft)
- Highest elevation: 2,432 m (7,979 ft)
- Lowest elevation: 0 m (0 ft)

Population (2024 census)
  - Total: 90,123
  - Density: 322.86/km^{2} (836.20/sq mi)
  - Households: 21,101

Economy
  - Income class: 1st municipal income class
  - Poverty incidence: 27.32% (2023)
  - Revenue: ₱ 426.3 million (2024)
  - Assets: ₱ 1,031 million (2024)
  - Expenditure: ₱ 390.3 million (2024)
  - Liabilities: ₱ 330.4 million (2024)

Service provider
  - Electricity: Negros Electric and Power Corporation (NEPC)
- Time zone: UTC+8 (PST)
- ZIP code: 6129
- PSGC: 064520000
- IDD : area code: +63 (0)34
- Native languages: Hiligaynon; Tagalog
- Named after: Murcia, Spain

Murcia, officially the Municipality of Murcia, is a municipality in the province of Negros Occidental, Philippines. According to the 2024 census, it has a population of 90,123 people.

== History ==
Murcia was founded by an Augustinian Recollect priest named Fr. Miguel Alvarez in 1860.

During World War II, the municipal hall of the town was used as a garrison by the invading Japanese. Due to resistance from Filipino guerillas, the Japanese withdrew from the municipality on April 21, 1945.

== Geography ==
It is 17 kilometres (11 mi) east of Bacolod.

=== Barangays ===
Murcia is politically subdivided into 23 barangays. Each barangay consists of puroks and some have sitios.

- Abo-abo
- Alegria
- Amayco
- Zone I (Poblacion)
- Zone II (Poblacion)
- Zone III (Poblacion)
- Zone IV (Poblacion)
- Zone V (Poblacion)
- Blumentritt
- Buenavista
- Caliban
- Canlandog

- Cansilayan
- Damsite
- Iglau-an
- Lopez Jaena
- Minoyan
- Pandanon (Silos)
- San Miguel
- Santa Cruz
- Santa Rosa
- Salvacion
- Talotog

=== Climate ===
Climate data for Murcia, Negros Occidental
Month	Jan	Feb	Mar	Apr	May	Jun	Jul	Aug	Sep	Oct	Nov	Dec	Year
Mean daily maximum °C (°F)	27 (81)	28 (82)	29 (84)	31 (88)	30 (86)	29 (84)	28 (82)	29 (84)	28 (82)	28 (82)	28 (82)	27 (81)	29 (83)
Mean daily minimum °C (°F)	22 (72)	22 (72)	22 (72)	23 (73)	24 (75)	24 (75)	24 (75)	24 (75)	24 (75)	24 (75)	23 (73)	23 (73)	23 (74)
Average precipitation mm (inches)	120 (4.7)	87 (3.4)	95 (3.7)	97 (3.8)	187 (7.4)	263 (10.4)	251 (9.9)	220 (8.7)	227 (8.9)	268 (10.6)	220 (8.7)	158 (6.2)	2,193 (86.4)
Average rainy days	16.1	12.6	15.4	16.8	25.8	28.4	29.1	27.9	27.7	28.5	23.9	18.4	270.6
Source: Meteoblue (modeled/calculated data, not measured locally)

== Demographics ==
Population census of Murcia

Year	Pop.	±% p.a.
1903	4,227	—
1918	10,058	+5.95%
1939	18,948	+3.06%
1948	28,243	+4.53%
1960	23,482	−1.53%
1970	32,176	+3.20%

Year	Pop.	±% p.a.
1975	38,668	+3.75%
1980	45,162	+3.15%
1990	50,996	+1.22%
1995	55,128	+1.47%
2000	59,358	+1.60%
2007	71,289	+2.56%

Year	Pop.	±% p.a.
2010	75,207	+1.97%
2015	81,286	+1.49%
2020	88,868	+1.89%
2024	90,123	+0.34%

Source: Philippine Statistics Authority

== Economy ==
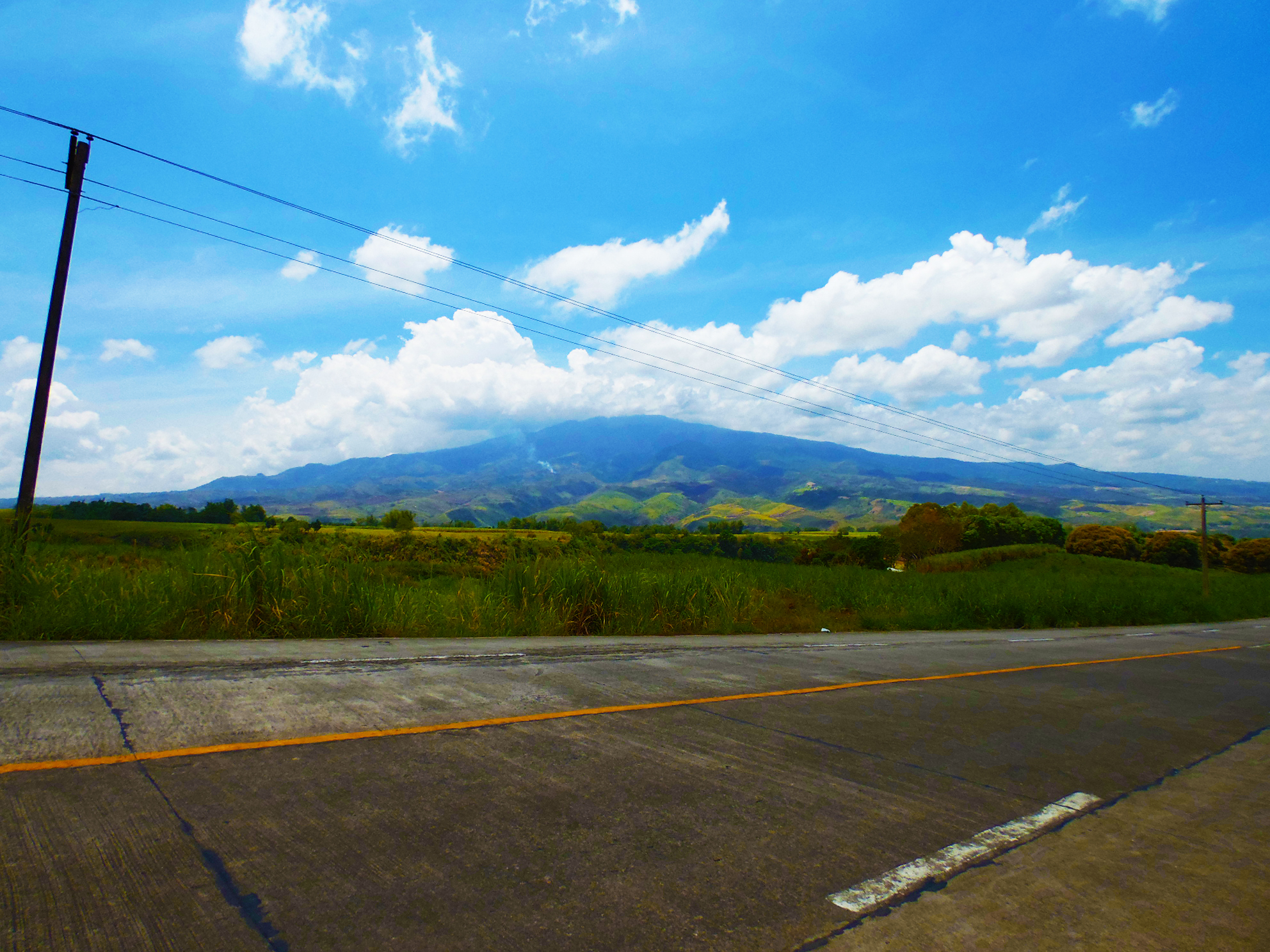
Negros Occidental Eco-Tourism Highway (N69) along Murcia

Poverty incidence of Murcia (%)

Source: Philippine Statistics Authority

== Tourism ==
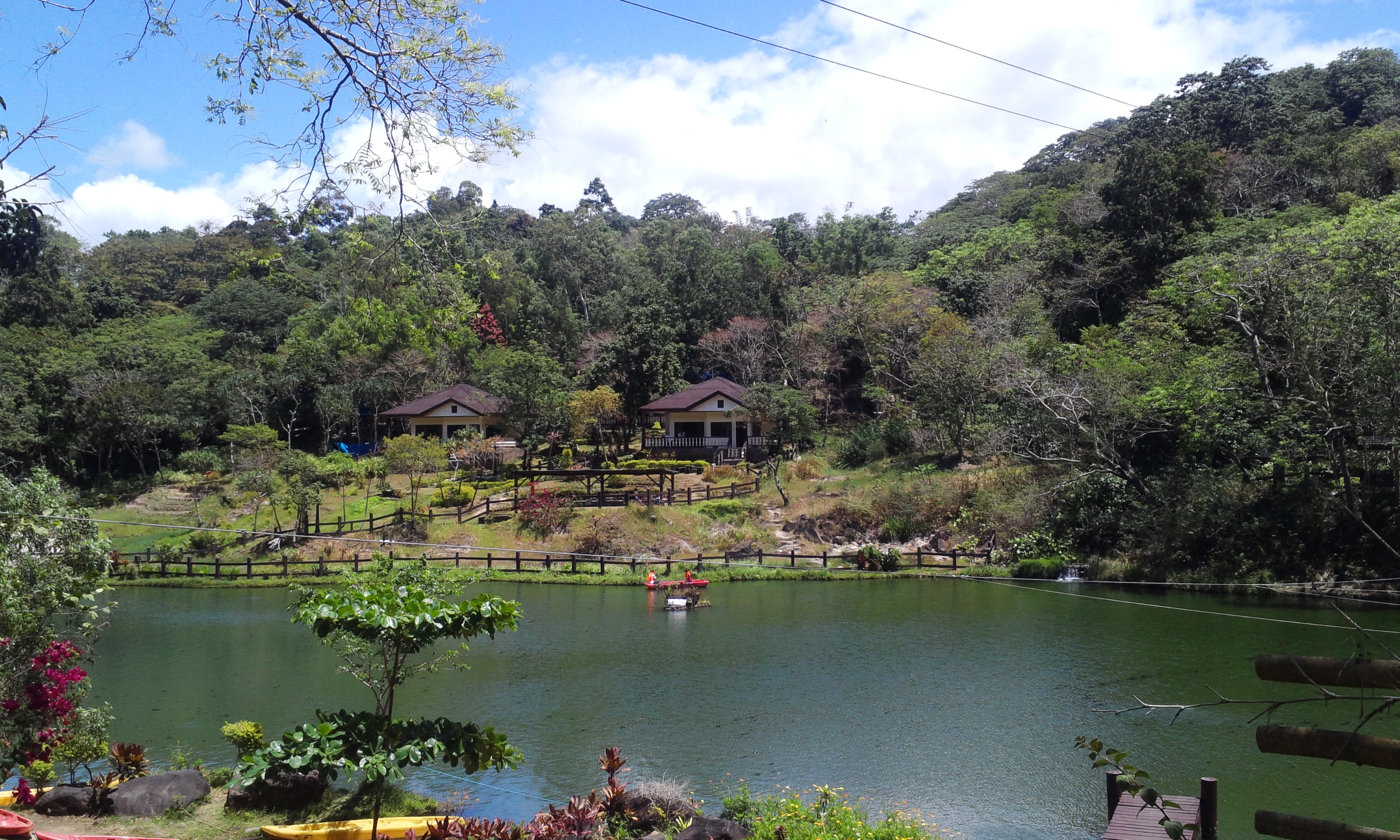
Lake in Mambukal

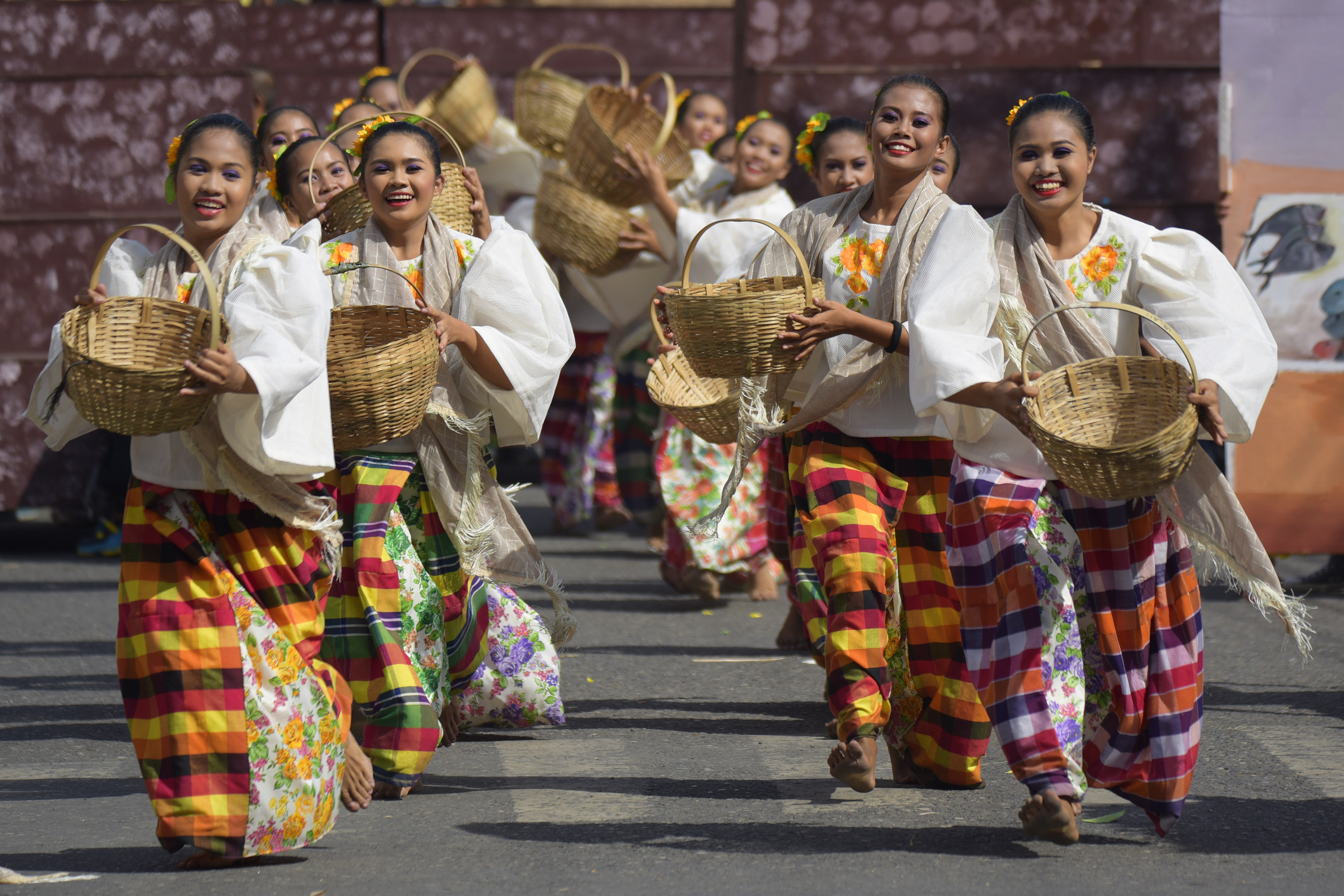
Tinabu-ay of Murcia Festival

The Mambukal Resort, located in Barangay Minoyan, features bats as a key tourist attraction. The resort is home to three species: the Philippine flying fox (Philippine giant fruit bat), the Philippine bare-backed fruit bat, and the little golden-mantled flying fox, which is endangered. They produce a nitrogen-rich organic fertilizer called guano. Bats are included in the list of animals protected by Republic Act 9147 (Wildlife Resources Conservation and Protection Act). In December 2007, the provincial government-owned resort opened its "Butterfly Garden". Live predators of butterflies like tarantula, wild geckos, scorpions, millipedes and centipedes were displayed.

Aside from the Mambukal Mountain Resort, Murcia is also famous for its Pandanon River Resort situated in the Murcia-Don Salvador Benedicto municipality border. A golf and country club is situated in Barangay Blumentritt.

== Notable personalities ==
- Donnie Nietes - Professional Boxing World Champion

== Twin cities ==
- Murcia, Spain
- Baguio, Philippines
