= Negros Occidental Provincial Capitol =

- Capitolio Provincial sang Negros Occidental
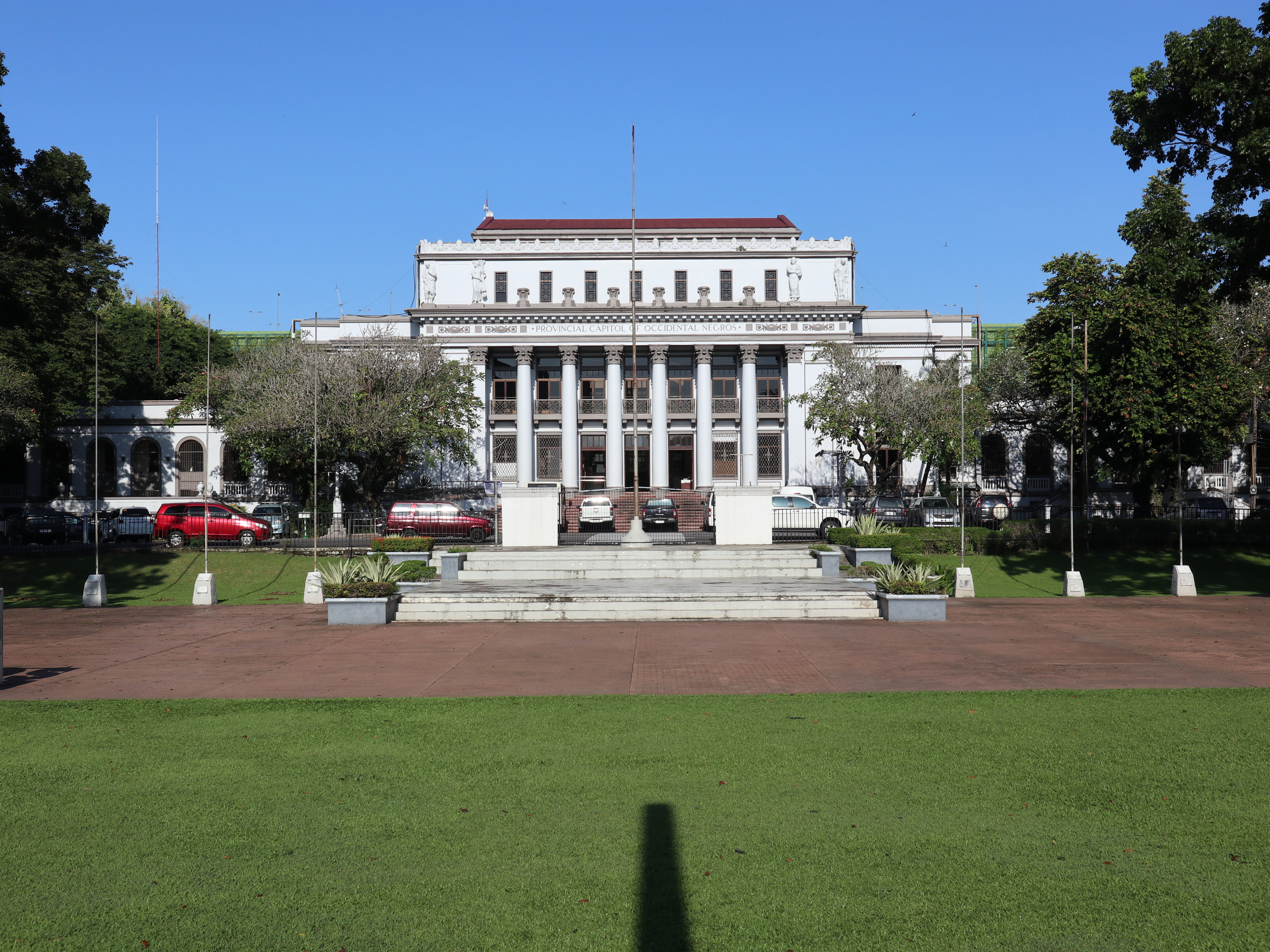
- Façade of the capitol building
- Interactive map of the Negros Occidental Provincial Capitol area

General information
- Type: Neoclassical
- Architectural style: Beaux Art
- Location: Negros Occidental Provincial Capitol Complex, Bacolod, Negros Occidental, Philippines
- Coordinates: 10.676760°N 122.950880°E
- Current tenants: Eugenio Jose Lacson; Governor of Negros Occidental
- Construction started: 1927
- Completed: October 23, 1933
- Inaugurated: January 11, 1935
- Renovated: 2001–2004
- Owner: Provincial Government of Negros Occidental

Design and construction
- Architect: Juan M. Arellano
- Architecture firm: Bureau of Public Works

The Negros Occidental Provincial Capitol is the seat of the provincial government of Negros Occidental located at Gatuslao St., Bacolod, Philippines. Within its complex is the Capitol Park and Lagoon.

== History ==
Before its present location, the provincial government of Negros Occidental was in the house donated by Jose Ruiz de Luzuriaga, who was part of the Philippine Commission established by the Americans in 1901, which was composed of three members.

In 1926, then Governor Jose Locsin decided to erect a provincial capitol building that reflected the province's status as the wealthiest at that time due to the boost in the sugar industry. The Provincial Board looked onto his request and set aside a budget of Php 255,000. On June 2, 1927, the Bureau of Public Works, which had the mandate to approve all the construction of public infrastructures in the country, approved the proposal of the province and authorized the construction of the capitol.

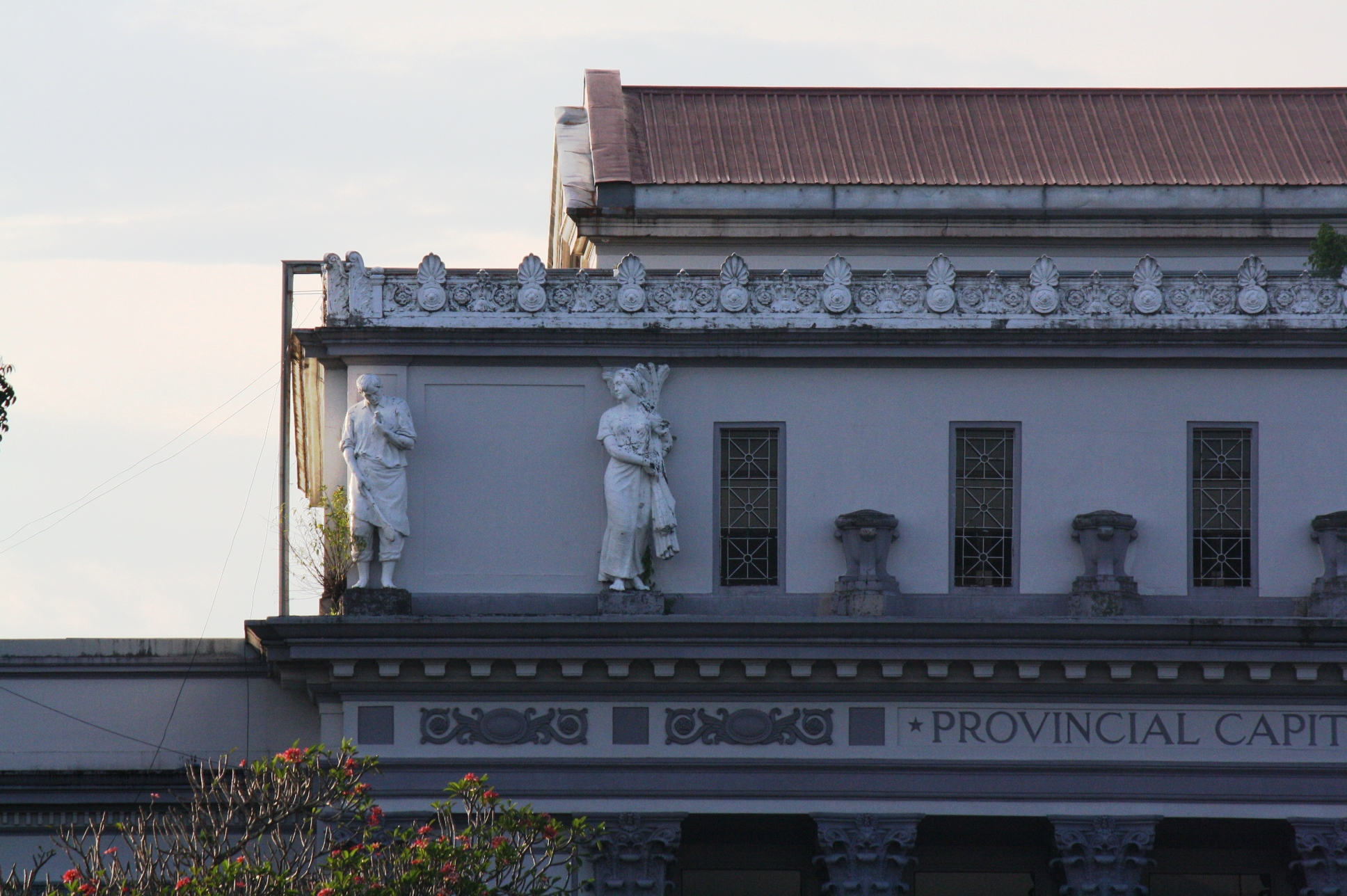
Details of the Negros Occidental Provincial Capitol Building design.

The site that was identified to be the best location for the capitol was owned by the Gonzaga family. Part of the area was a swamp and the grass was used to feed the horses pulling the calesas, which was the main mode of transportation in the towns and cities in the province.

The Gonzaga heirs refused to sell their land and the province filed for expropriation against the family. The heirs, namely, Jose Gonzaga Torres, the Gonzaga children Gertrudes, Adela, Aurelia, Mamerta, Juan, Francisco and Vilardo, represented by lawyer and Bacolod Capitan Municipal Manuel Fernandez Yanson, did not adhere to the P1,200 per hectare expropriation price. As the province was not bent on increasing the price, the case was left to the hands of the court to decide. Eventually, the heirs gave in and the immediate construction of the capitol was directed by the Bureau of Public Works before the end of 1927.

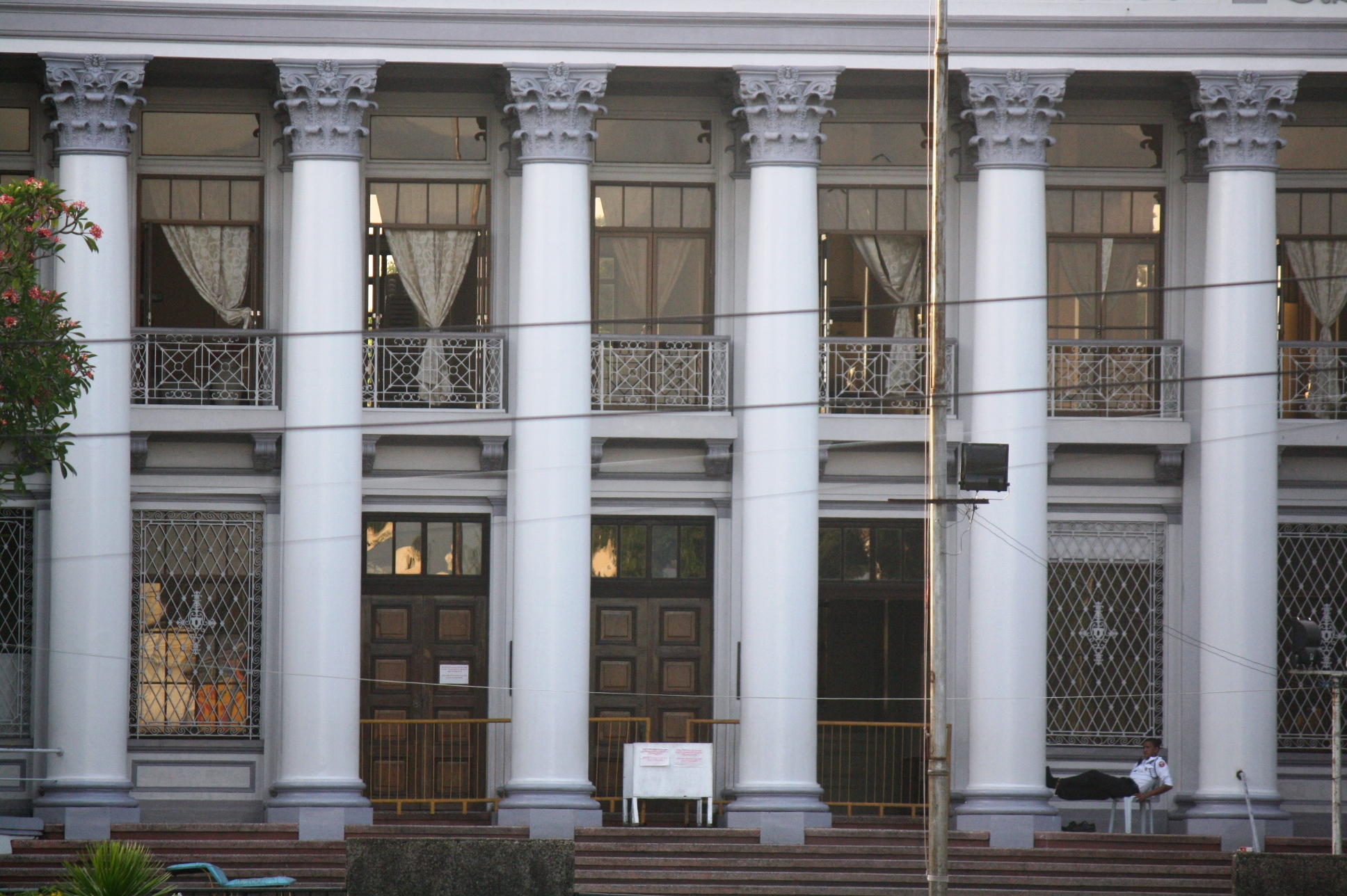
The colonnades.

Not satisfied with the pace of the contractor, Manuel Concepcion, in his implementation of the contract, the government confiscated his bond and took over the project. Although the structure was finished on October 23, 1933, the capitol was only formally accepted on January 11, 1935, during the term of Governor Emilio Gaston. In the same year, Negros Occidental's Court of First Instance ordered the government to compensate the other Gonzaga heirs - Magdalena, Carmen and Vicente - who were not included in the expropriation proceedings but whose lands were covered in the construction of the building. The three received payment of P1,552.40 plus 6 percent interest from April 30, 1933.

When World War II broke out, the Japanese Imperial Army occupied the capitol and converted it into its headquarters. Governor Antonio Lizares took office in Talisay, his hometown. For health reasons, he gave up his post and Governor Vicente Gustilo, who based his office in Cadiz, took over until the war ended. However, both governors were in name only as the Japanese were the ones running the province.

In July 2001, rehabilitation of the capitol was initiated by Governor Joseph G. Marañon and it was inaugurated on June 23, 2004. On July 19, 2004, the National Historical Commission of the Philippines under Resolution No. 9, declared it as a National Historical Landmark.

== Architecture ==
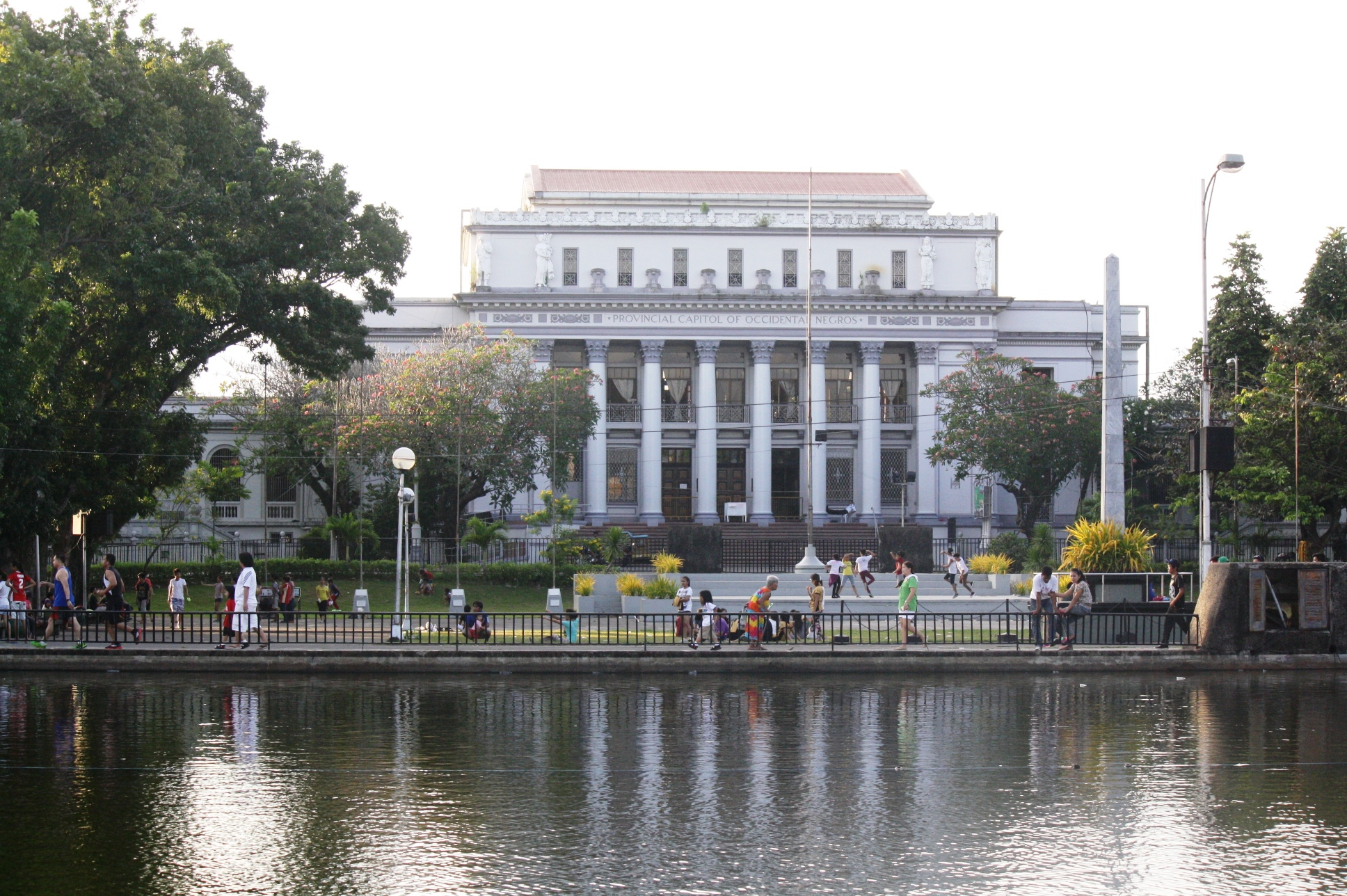
The Negros Occidental Provincial Capitol Building.

The Negros Occidental Provincial Capitol Building followed Daniel Burnham's Beaux Art style. When William Cameron Forbes was the governor general in the Philippines in 1904, he invited Burnham to the country, who, in turn, recommended as consulting architect to the government William E. Parsons. When he arrived in 1905, Parsons established the architectural office of the Bureau of Public Works which was composed of American and Filipino architects, such as Juan Nakpil, Tomas Mapua, and Juan de Guzman Arellano. Using the neo-classical architectural design of Burnham for the capitol, Juan Arellano executed the project.

The building is built in a shape of the letter E composed of the main entrance, which is the middle part, and of the wings on both sides of the center. The prominent feature of the central section are wide steps that lead to colonnades of about three-story high and with Corinthian capitals on the upper portion.

The works of National Artist for Sculpture Guillermo Tolentino are displayed in the capitol building and the lagoon fronting the building.

== See also ==
- Negros Museum
- Capitol Park and Lagoon
- Capitol Central
- Bacolod Public Plaza
- Fountain of Justice
- Negros Occidental
