= Cadiz (disambiguation) =

Cádiz (Spanish: Cádiz) is a city in Spain.

Cadiz or Cádiz may also refer to:

== Places ==
=== Spain ===
- Cádiz (Andalusian Parliament Electoral District), electoral district for the Parliament of Andalusia
- Cadiz (province), the Spanish province including Cádiz
- Cádiz (Spanish Congress Electoral District), electoral district for the Congress of Deputies
- Cádiz (wine region), the Spanish terroir around Cádiz
- Bay of Cádiz, the body of water between the city's main island and the mainland
- Bay of Cádiz (comarca), the Spanish county on the mainland beside Cádiz
- Gulf of Cádiz, the arm of the Atlantic nearby

=== Other places ===
- Cadiz, Negros Occidental, in the Philippines
- Cadiz, California, in the United States
- Cadiz, Illinois, in the United States
- Cadiz, Indiana, in the United States
- Cadiz, Kentucky, in the United States
- Cadiz, Ohio, in the United States

== Facilities and sites ==
- Nueva Cádiz, an archaeological site in Venezuela
- Cadiz Solar Power Plant, a solar power plant in Cadiz, Negros Occidental, Philippines
- Cádiz solar power plant, a solar power plant in Spain operated by Endesa

== Ships and vehicles ==
- Amoco Cadiz, an oil tanker that sank in 1978, causing the fifth-largest oil spill in history.
- HMS Cadiz, two ships of the British Royal Navy.

== Other ==
- CADIZ, an acronym for the Canadian Air Defense Identification Zone
- CADiZ, software tools for working with Z notation
- "Cadiz" (Albéniz), a composition by Isaac Albéniz
- Cadiz (beetle), a genus of leaf beetles
- Cádiz CF (Cádiz Club de Fútbol), an association football team based in Cadiz, Spain
- Cadiz Inc., a Los Angeles-based resource-management company started by Keith Brackpool and Mark Liggett
- Cádiz Stradivarius, an antique violin crafted by Antonio Stradivari in 1722
- Jhonder Cádiz (born 1995), Venezuelan footballer

== See also ==
- Battle of Cádiz (disambiguation), the name of several battles near Cadiz
- Cadix (French: Cadiz), the codename of a World War II clandestine intelligence center
