= NOHS =

NOHS may refer to:

- Negros Occidental High School, Bacolod City, Negros Occidental, Philippines
- North Oconee High School, Bogart, Georgia, United States
- North Oldham High School, Goshen, Kentucky, United States
