= Jose Vasquez Aguilar =

Filipino educator (1900–1980)

Community Development Research Council
- In office 1959–1959

Philippine Center for Language Studies
- In office May 1959 – around 1970

Personal details
- Born: March 23, 1900 Barrio Caduhaan, Cadiz, Negros Occidental, Philippine Islands
- Died: January 31, 1980 (aged 79)
- Spouse: Ramona Deysolong
- Education: Cadiz Central School; Negros Occidental High School; Jaro Industrial School (Now Central Philippine University); Denison University
- Awards: Ramon Magsaysay Award for Government Service

Jose Vasquez Aguilar (March 23, 1900 – January 31, 1980) is the first Filipino who received the Ramon Magsaysay Award (considered as Nobel Prize of Asia) (also the first awardee of the said award for Government Service). He is also a recipient in the government service category of the said award which he shared with Chintaman Deshmukh in 1959. He is also recognized as the Father of the Community School Movement in the Philippines, pioneering reforms to ensure that community life is integrated in the education system. His community school model banks on the partnership between teachers, parents, and community with the goal of ensuring a practical education using the vernacular as a medium of instruction.

== Personal life ==
Born on March 23, 1900, Jose Vasquez Aguilar was the second of eight children of Martin Aguilar and Sofia Vasquez. As a child he won oratorical contests because of his deep and booming voice. He finished his elementary education at Cadiz Central School in 1915 and graduated from Negros Occidental High School in 1920.

He was sent off to Iloilo together with his older brother Martin Jr. to stay with their aunt Patrocinio Gamboa, best known in Philippine history for her role in transporting the Katipunan flag. In Iloilo, he entered the Jaro Industrial School which would later on become known as Central Philippine University. Then Baptist missionary and teacher Rev. William Orison Valentine encouraged Aguilar to continue his college education at Denison University in Ohio. Seeing the young man's intelligence and diligence, Valentine wanted to marry him off to his daughter but at that time, Aguilar was already in love with Ramona Deysolong, the daughter of a senator's administrator.

He left for the United States in 1921, supporting himself by peddling goods while still being active in oratorical matters. He received his Bachelor of Philosophy degree two years later in 1925 after which he immediately returned to the Philippines as a teacher of English at his alma mater Negros Occidental High School.

After a series of promotions, he finally married his sweetheart in 1927 and the union brought forth six children: Neva, Sonya, Elmer, Delia, Lina, and Mila. He died of heart attack on January 31, 1980.

== Career ==
Aguilar quickly rose in rank in the education sector, first being promoted in 1926 to academic supervisor in Masbate. He was transferred to Cebu with the same position the following year. Also in 1927, he topped the Division Superintendents' Examination, which was followed by his marriage to his sweetheart. In succeeding years, he served as division superintendent in Camarines Norte, Antique, Samar, Capiz, and Iloilo until 1954.

During World War II, Aguilar was almost killed because of his college education in the United States and for being perceived as having pro-American sentiments. It was only after the war, in 1948, when he published his novel The Great Faith which revolves around the Occupation and which attempts to "portray faith in cultural roots as they responded to friendly encouragement from a great democratic nation".

At the height of his career, Aguilar sought to address issues like the high number of dropouts, low level of language proficiency, irrelevance of the school curriculum to daily realities, and the cultural gap between the elites and the ordinary citizens. For this, he created the Community School, a model based on the cooperative efforts of teachers, parents, and community. With this framework, he was also able to help double the production of crops and rice in Capiz by introducing second cropping.

In 1948, Aguilar was instrumental in initiating a research project in Santa Barbara, Iloilo, with an official endorsement from the Bureau of Public Schools in Manila. The project centered on the use of the vernacular as the medium of instruction in early childhood education. The research project supported his theory that students taught in their native Hiligaynon obtained significantly higher scores than those taught in English. In addition, the first group also displayed greater interest in learning, aside from exhibiting more dominant, extroverted, and mature traits.

He retired as superintendent of schools in Iloilo in 1954 to accept the position of full professor in the College of Education at the University of the Philippines where he became college dean in 1958. A year later, he retired from government service to co-direct the Philippine Center for Language Studies.

With the establishment of the Office of the Presidential Assistant on Community Development (PACD) in 1956 under Executive Order 156, the first barrio councils replaced the grassroots-based community school. Ironically, this executive order was created under the leadership of Ramon Magsaysay himself. Year later, the Philippine Center for Language Studies produced results contrary to early findings on using the vernacular, in favor of returning to English to be the main language for early education teaching.

== Honors ==
For his contributions to the Philippine educational system and community welfare, Aguilar received numerous awards, the most prominent being the Ramon Magsaysay Award for Government Service in 1959. He also received an honorary doctorate degree from the Central Philippine University in 1952.
