= Mila D. Aguilar =

Filipino poet

Mila D. Aguilar (1949 – October 13, 2023) was a Filipina poet, novelist, essayist, activist, educator, website designer, and video documentarian. Writing under the nom de guerre Clarita Roja during the dangerous days of the Marcos dictatorship, she is best remembered for having been "the best known poet in the underground movement during the Marcos Regime." More broadly, she is also known for her leadership roles in the resistance against the authoritarian regime of Ferdinand Marcos, and for her continued social activism in the years after Marcos was deposed, including the last phase of her activism which was strongly influenced with her beliefs after her 1990 conversion to Born Again Christianity.

As a writer she is best known for the poetry books Why Cage Pigeons?, A Comrade is as Precious as a Rice Seedling and Journey: An Autobiography in Verse (1964-1995), and the autobiographical novel "The Nine Deaths of M".

== Early life and education ==
Mila D. Aguilar was born in Iloilo in 1949, the youngest daughter of Jose Vasquez Aguilar and Ramona Deysolong. Her father was well known as a founding figure in the Community School Movement in the Philippines, and had been recognized in 1952 as the first Filipino recipient of the Ramon Magsaysay Award, and also the first recipient of the award under the cagtegory of Government Service.

She studied English and Humanities at the University of the Philippines Diliman, writing poetry which was published in the Philippines Free Press, Sunday Times Magazine and the Philippines Graphic while studying, and finally earning her diploma in 1969.

== Early career ==
Immediately after graduating, Aguilar began her career by teaching at the UP Diliman Department of English and Comparative Literature. She also wrote for Philippines Graphic from 1969 to 1971, working alongside Amadis Ma. Guerrero and Petronilo Daroy.

== Life in the underground ==
In her poetry anthology "Journey: An Autobiography in Verse (1964-1995)," Aguilar described her writings from 1971 to 1984 as being part of her "red period," because it was a time when she was actively involved in the underground resistance against the dictatorship of Ferdinand Marcos.

=== Going underground ===
Aguilar She first became exposed to the National Democratic (ND) movement when she was assigned by the Graphic to cover the ND youth and student movement, which meant covering the various pickets and demonstrations, particularly the Diliman commune.

She finally joined the underground movement against Marcos in 1971 when Marcos used the Plaza Miranda bombing as a reason to suspend the writ of habeas corpus.

Over the course of the next 13 years, she started out as an ordinary member of the Communist Party of the Philippines assigned as a driver plying the route between Manila and Isabela, and then later found herself assuming several top positions in the organization, including head of the Regional United Front Commission of Mindanao, and then head of the National United Front.

=== Marriage and widowhood ===
She met fellow activist Magtanggol Roque early on in her involvement with the CPP, and the two were married through party rites in the mountains of Isabela on May 5, 1971, and then getting a court marriage in Pasay City not long after. She had a son with Roque, who was seven years older than her. And he rented an apartment in their name in BF homes in Parañaque. But she barely stayed in the house, focusing on her duties as a driver for the underground movement. She was deeply distressed that they had to leave their son with Aguilar's mother to keep him safe.

Roque was eventually killed in May 1981 when he was shot while trying to warn fellow activists that their safehouse was about to be raided.

=== Resignation from the CPP ===
Aguilar resigned from the Communist Party of the Philippines after the 1983 assassination of Ninoy Aquino. She had written a leaflet expressing sympathy for Aquino which the Central Committee rejected, and Aguilar resigned because of the disagreement.

By this time, Aguilar had become assistant director at St. Joseph's College, and she continued in that role until her arrest in 1984.

== Imprisonment ==
Despite her resignation from the underground movement, Aguilar was arrested in August 1984. She was accosted by men in several vans which stopped the jeepney she was riding, and then threw her onto the backseat of a waiting car. Based on their actions, she said she realized they probably did not yet know that she had resigned from the CPP.

Aguilar was held in solitary confinement as a political detainee at Camp Crame, where she was subjected to psychological, mental, emotional, and sexual abuse.

During this time, however, Aguilar continued to write, and she later described her writings from her time in prison as being part of her "purple period," and labeled it as a period where "the questions start." University of the Philippines critic Mary Grace R. Concepcion notes that:

"By this time, Aguilar had already severed ties with the party and was questioning the proletariat, the party dogma, Christian dogma, and even the petty-bourgeoisie. Aguilar said she felt that everyone was “exploiting” everyone else. Thus, unlike the poems from the “Red Period”, the fight was not an outward struggle against the bigger forces of imperialism and feudalism, nor an inward struggle of the self through an ideological remolding. Rather the struggle was towards an individuation of meanings, wherein one struggles to be an individual above any form of social and collective organization."

Some of her friends formed the Free Mila D. Aguilar Committee, and they published a collection of the works she had written in prison, titled "Why Cage Pigeons?" to help raise funds for her and lobby for her release.

== Release, conversion, and continued activism ==
Aguilar's time as a political detainee ended in 1996 when Marcos was deposed by the People Power Revolution, and her release marked a period of discovery which led to her conversion to Born Again Christianity in 1990, which would be a defining influence on her as a writer, as an activist, and as a person moving forward.

Acknowledging that part of her life which began with her conversion marked a final chapter rather than a mere phase, she later labelled her literary works from this time as simply "period" in contrast to the previous "blue", "red", and "purple" periods. University of the Philippines academic reviewer Mary Grace R. Concepcion notes that Aguilar's periodization of her works in this way in the 1995 poetry collection "Journey: An Autobiography in Verse (1964-1995)" acknowledges that her "progression of self-awareness therefore ends with god and religion."

=== People Power Revolution and release from prison ===
Aguilar was released from Prison in 1986, after the People Power Revolution. After her release, returned to teaching at St Joseph's College.

During this time, she became a videographer, and produced, wrote, and directed almost 50 videos on subjects ranging from community organizations to regional cultures and good manners for government employees. She eventually also designed websites, describing herself as a "webweaver."

=== Conversion to Born Again Christianity ===
Aguilar became a Born Again Christian in 1990, significantly reframing both her literary work and her social activism for the rest of her life. She famously reinterpreted her pseudonym Clarita Roja, which means "clear red," to be a reference to the redeeming Blood of Christ. Her beliefs shaped her continued activism, as she denounced the injustices perpetuated by later government administrations.

Describing at a 2012 book launching how her writing and social engagement was affected by her conversion experience, and explaining her intention to write more essays and stories, Aguilar said:

“College was not enough. Even 13 years underground and one and a half years in prison were not enough. I had to do video documentaries all over the Philippines for a few years, then take Philippine Studies formally and informally as well[...] I finally got it. Without a vision, the people perish! That vision is God’s for the people of God, led by the children of God. Poetry is emotion expressed in unified rhythm, imagery and tension. What I cannot express of this vision in poetry, I must express in essay and story. Then pray that God will accept my paeans to Him, my plaints for and in behalf of my people.”

=== Later work ===
Aguilar returned to teaching at the UP Diliman Department of English and Comparative Literature from 2000 to 2006. In 2013, she published her autobiographical novel "The Nine Deaths of M." as an ebook on Kindle. In 2021, she co-wrote volume 2 of "A History of the University of the Philippines," covering the years 1943 to 1975, alongsise Rosario Cruz-Lucero, Ruth Pison, and Alexander Dacanay.

== Death ==
On October 13, 2023, Aguilar died at the age of 74.

== Works ==
As a poet, she has written about 400 poems in English, Filipino, and Ilonggo, about 125 of which are in Journey: An Autobiography in Verse (1964-1995), a collection published by the University of the Philippines Press in 1996. The poems in this collection were culled from six books printed in Manila, San Francisco, and New York City between the years 1974 and 1987 (including A Comrade is as Precious as a Rice Seedling), as well as from her writing in subsequent years up to 1995. Chronicle of a Life Foretold: 101 Poems (1995-2005) was published in 2012 by Popular Bookstore, and two more collections Poetry as Prophecy (2005-2013), and an untitled book, remain unpublished.

- Dare to Struggle, Dare to Win! (Manila 1974) using nom de guerre Clarita Roja
- The Mass Line (A Second Remoulding) (Manila 1977) using nom de guerre Clarita Roja
- Why Cage Pigeons? (Manila 1984)
- Pall Hanging over Manila (San Francisco 1984)
- A Comrade is as Precious as a Rice Seedling (New York 1984, 1985 and 1987; also in Braille, Womyn's Series)
- Journey: An Autobiography in Verse (1964–1995) (U of the Philippines Press 1996)
- Chronicle of a Life Foretold: 110 Poems (1995–2004) (Popular Bookstore)
- The Nine Deaths of M (Kindle 2013)
