= Lakawon =

Island in the Philippines

Llacaon
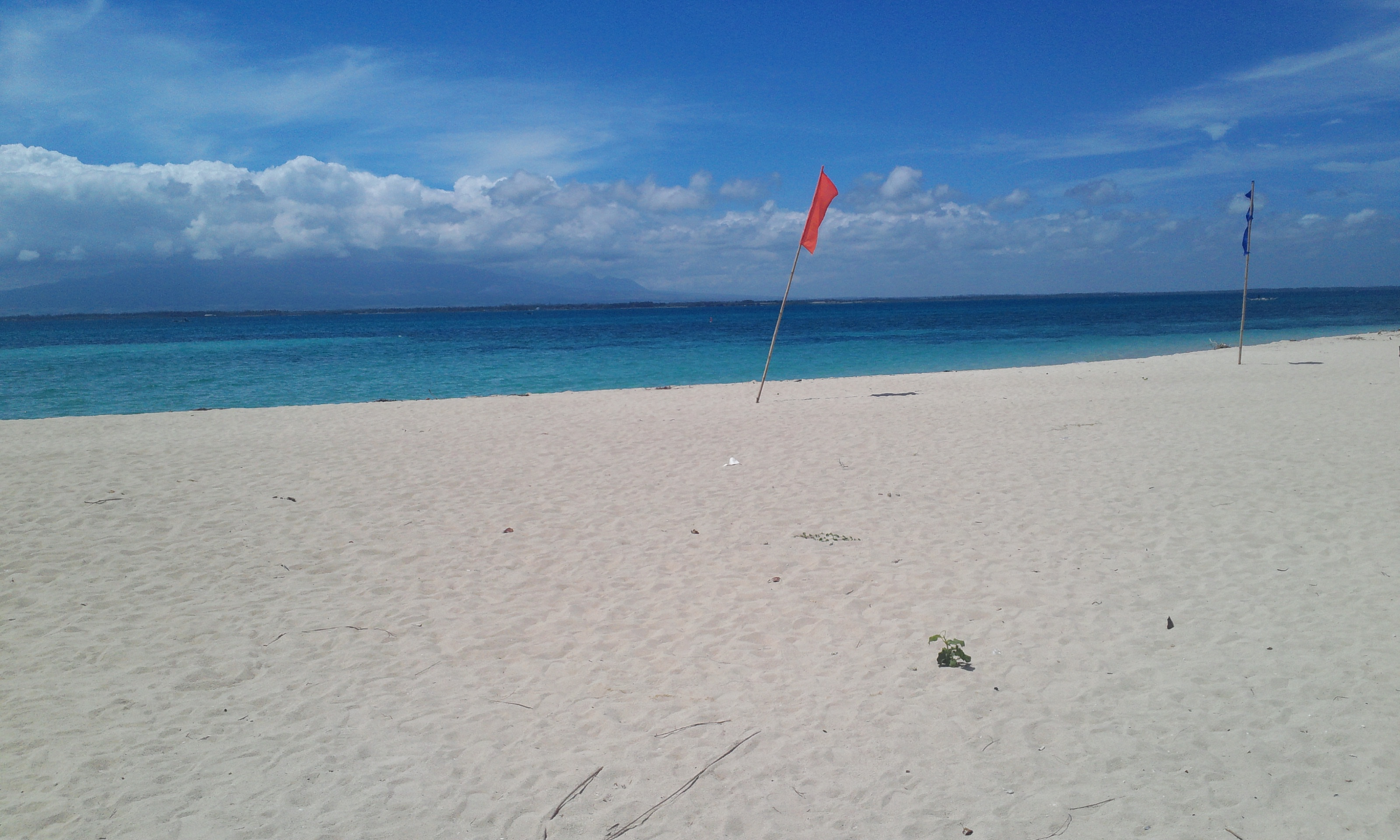

- Location within Philippines

Geography
- Coordinates: 11°2′33″N 123°12′4″E
- Adjacent to: Guimaras Strait; Visayan Sea
- Area: 0.13 km^{2} (0.050 sq mi)

Administration
- Philippines
- Region: Negros Island Region
- Province: Negros Occidental
- City: Cadiz
- Barangay: Cadiz Viejo

Demographics
- Population: (2000)
- Ethnic groups: Visayan

Lakawon, also called Llacaon, is a 13-hectare (32-acre), banana-shaped island off the coast of Cadiz in the northern portion of Negros Occidental, a province in Western Visayas of the Philippines. A white sand beach resort on the island, a family-run business, is a popular destination for both local and foreign tourists.

== Etymology ==
The term Lakawon is derived from a Cebuano word lakaw, meaning "to walk". The island may have gotten its name because during low tide, one has to literally walk or wade a long distance to or from the main island.

== Features ==
Lakawon is 48 kilometres (30 mi) north of Bacolod, the provincial capital. The island is accessible from the coast of Barangay Cadiz Viejo via a 20-minute boat ride. Lakawon's white sand beach is claimed to rival that of Boracay, a popular island resort off the coast of Aklan in Panay. In stark contrast to its more famous counterpart, however, Lakawon has a smaller influx of tourists, and the island is not commercially developed.

The island is more akin to a sandbar. The white sand beaches are largely on the part of the island facing the island of Negros. The opposite portion, facing the open sea, is more rugged. There is a small fishing village on one side of the island. The inhabitants there earn their living from harvesting the sea's bounty.

== As a destination ==
Cadiz Viejo, which is the nearest mainland point to the island, may be accessed via private or public transportation. From Bacolod City, or any point of Negros, jeepney drivers are available for hire. One may also take Ceres Liner buses from any of the cities and municipalities in the province. From the national highway in Cadiz Viejo, a dirt road leads to the shore. The island is visible from here and parking space is available. The ride to the island by motorized banca takes about 20 minutes. It is best to arrive in the morning during high tide–the waters will be calmer and there will be less wading required to get to the boat.

== Typhoon Haiyan ==
Residents of Lakawon Island in Cadiz said that of the ~280 houses in the island, only about 10 were left intact after Typhoon Haiyan (named Yolanda in the Philippines) hit in November 2013.
