= Dr. Vicente F. Gustilo Memorial National High School =

Public high school in Negros Occidental, Philippines

Coordinates: 10°57′31″N 123°18′20″E

Dr. Vicente F. Gustilo Memorial National High School is a public secondary school in Cadiz, Negros Occidental, Philippines. It is located on Cabahug Street. From being known as Cadiz High School, it was renamed Cadiz City High School after Cadiz's city charter was granted in 1967. By virtue of Batas Pambansa 476 on June 10, 1983, it was officially renamed Dr. Vicente F. Gustilo Memorial National High School.

It teaches students in grades seventh through tenth in Cadiz, Negros Occidental of Western Visayas (Region VI). The school has 91 instructional rooms and 5 non-instructional rooms, which are all powered by a power grid. With 3,502 students, class size is around 39 students. Marissa A. Ordaniel is in charge of the school, acting as the school's Head Teacher and Officer in Charge.

== School Principals ==
Year	Principal
2014 to date	Dindo Ampalla
	Wilfredo Mijares
	Moises T. Dime
