= Cadiz Solar Power Plant =

Solar power plant in Negros Occidental, Philippines

Helios Solar Power Plant
- Official name: Helios Solar Power Plant
- Country: Philippines
- Location: Cadiz, Negros Occidental
- Coordinates: 10°55′15″N 123°17′47″E
- Status: Operational
- Construction began: July 2015
- Commission date: March 3, 2016
- Construction cost: ₱10 billion

Solar farm
- Type: Flat-panel PV

Power generation
- Units operational: 0
- Nameplate capacity: 132.5 MW

The Helios Solar Power Plant is a 132.5 MW solar power plant in Cadiz, Negros Occidental, Philippines. Upon its completion, the facility located in a 176-hectare (430-acre) land in Hacienda Paz, Barangay Tinampaan and is the largest solar power facility in Southeast Asia upon its commissioning. It was considered to be the biggest in Southeast Asia until it was beaten by Vietnam’s Dau Tieng plant in Tay Ninh Province and the Phu Yen solar plant respectively and the 7th largest in the world.

== Construction ==
Construction of the plant began in July 2015 with 2,500 Negrense employed during the facility's construction. 500 were employed for the plant's operations. The Cadiz plant was developed by Helios Solar Energy Corp., a joint venture between Thailand-based Soleq Solar Co. and Gregorio Araneta Inc. and was commissioned by Singapore-based Equis Funds Group. Construction cost of the plant amounts to ₱10 billion

Originally the solar facility's unveiling was set on February 19, 2016 but this was delayed. President Benigno Aquino III was invited for the ceremony but declined citing a busy schedule won't allow Aquino to attend. The facility commissioned as planned on March 3, 2016.
