= Cadiz, Negros Occidental =

Component city in Negros Occidental, Philippines

Cadiz
- Component city
- City of Cadiz
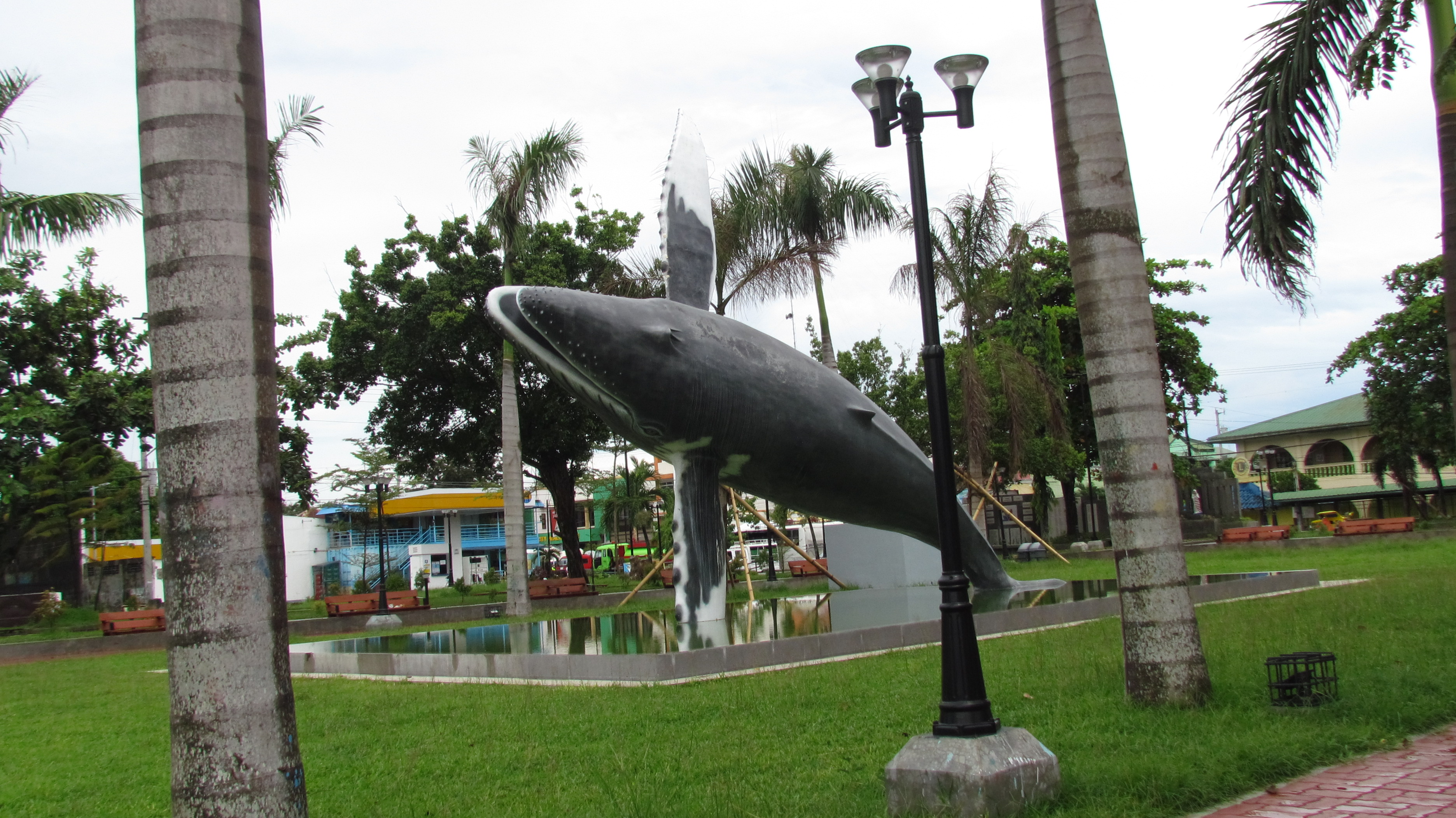
- View of Cadiz City Park

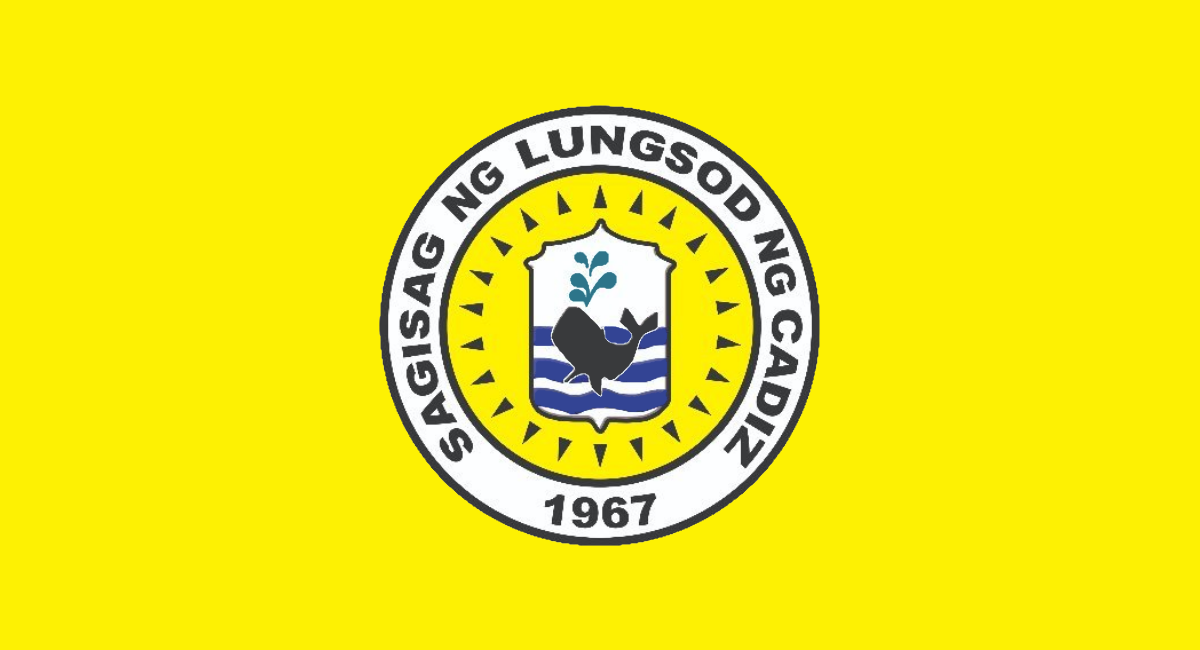
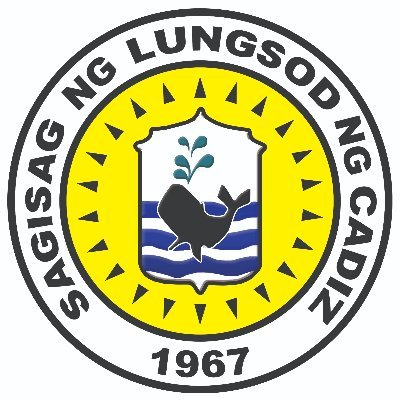
- Flag Seal
- Nicknames: "City of Whales" "Dinagsa Country of the North" "Dried Fish Capital of Negros Occidental"
- Motto: Bilis Cadiz, Ugyon Cadiznon
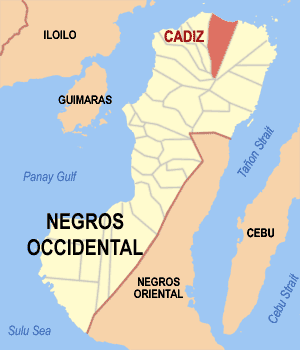
- Map of Negros Occidental with Cadiz highlighted
- Interactive map of Cadiz
- Location within the Philippines
- Coordinates: 10°57′N 123°18′E
- Country: Philippines
- Region: Negros Island Region
- Province: Negros Occidental
- District: 2nd district
- Founded: 1861
- Cityhood: July 4, 1967
- Named for: Cádiz, Spain
- Barangays: 22 (see Barangays)

Government
  - Type: Sangguniang Panlungsod
  - Mayor: Salvador G. Escalante Jr. (Lakas)
  - Vice Mayor: John Vincent I. Escalante (NUP)
  - Representative: Alfredo D. Marañon III (NUP)
  - City Council: Members: Marlon M. Metoda; Claire Therese L. Consing; Frances V. Guanzon; Maricel L. Desuyo; Fria Cristine A. Cervantes-Napiza; Kathrina Kaye L. Gustilo; Lalen H. Lamis; Joan Pauline O. Decolongon; Cedric Jon Nido D. Olvido; Vicente William M. Tabanao; Vicente C. Villacin, Jr. ^{‡}; Keanu P. Sarabia ^{◌}; ‡ ex officio ABC president; ◌ ex officio SK chairman
  - Electorate: 93,336 voters (2025)

Area
  - Total: 524.57 km^{2} (202.54 sq mi)
- Elevation: 115 m (377 ft)
- Highest elevation: 1,869 m (6,132 ft)
- Lowest elevation: 0 m (0 ft)

Population (2024 census)
  - Total: 161,558
  - Density: 307.98/km^{2} (797.67/sq mi)
  - Households: 39,146

Economy
  - Income class: 1st city income class
  - Poverty incidence: 23.68% (2023)
  - Revenue: ₱ 1,653 million (2024)
  - Assets: ₱ 5,632 million (2024)
  - Expenditure: ₱ 1,603 million (2024)
  - Liabilities: ₱ 2,357 million (2024)

Service provider
  - Electricity: Northern Negros Electric Cooperative (NONECO)
- Time zone: UTC+8 (PST)
- ZIP code: 6121
- PSGC: 064504000
- IDD : area code: +63 (0)34
- Native languages: Hiligaynon; Tagalog; Cebuano
- Named after: Cádiz, Spain
- Website: www.cadizcity.gov.ph

Cadiz, officially the City of Cadiz (Hiligaynon: Dakbanwa/Syudad sang Cadiz; Cebuano: Dakbayan sa Cadiz; Filipino: Lungsod ng Cadiz), is a component city in the province of Negros Occidental, Philippines. It was the capital of the short-lived province of Negros del Norte, before the creation of the province was declared unconstitutional on August 18, 1986.

According to the 2024 census, it has a population of 161,558 people.

Cadiz has promoted itself as the "Gateway and Premier Center of Agro-Fishery Resources of Negros Occidental," citing its coastal location, agricultural land, and marine resources. A commercial port serving the city was completed and inaugurated in 2010.

The city is a major sugarcane-producing area. This is transported to Victorias City for further refining. Another major source of livelihood is the harvest of seafood.

The Dinagsa Festival, a celebration which earned Cadiz the name of the Dinagsa Country of the north, is held annually on the last week of January. Some three kilometers off the coast of Barangay Cadiz Viejo is a white sand island resort of Lakawon, a popular destination among the local population.

== History ==
Cadiz traces its beginnings to the establishment of a traditional settlement in a place known as Cadiz Viejo, near the banks of the Hitalon River. Historical records showed that in 1861, the Spaniards came and named the settlement Cadiz because of its northern location which reminded them of the seaport by the same name in Spain.

Cadiz became a municipality independent from Saravia (now E.B. Magalona) in 1878. Its first appointed Gobernadorcillo was Antonio Cabahug, married to Capitana Francisca Cito. During the outbreak of the Philippine Revolution saw Cadiz take part in the insurrection in 1898. As her sons and daughters, headed by Francisco Abelarde, took up arms against their Spanish masters.

During the short-lived government of the cantonal state of the Federal Republica de Negros, Jose Lopez Vito was elected its president. At the onset of American rule, Cadiz was on its way to prosperity with the operation of two lumber companies in the area. The war years stopped these economic activities and brought much suffering to the people of Cadiz. The resistance movement and the local forces of the Philippine Commonwealth Army units put up the civil government in the mountains to deal with civilian affairs. In the post-war election of 1952, Joaquin Ledesma was elected mayor. Cadiz is also known as the "City of Whales" in 1960 because a number of whales washed to its shores in several different historical events thus became an iconic image of the city.

=== Cityhood ===
In July 1967, Cadiz was inaugurated as a city by virtue of Republic Act No. 4894 which was passed by Congress on June 17, 1967. The act was authored by Congressman Armando Gustilo.

=== Super-Typhoon Haiyan (Yolanda) ===
In November 2013, the city was heavily damaged by Typhoon Haiyan. Around 20,000 homes were damaged. In the island of Lakawon, from 250 homes, 10 was left standing. No casualties were reported in and around the city.

== Geography ==
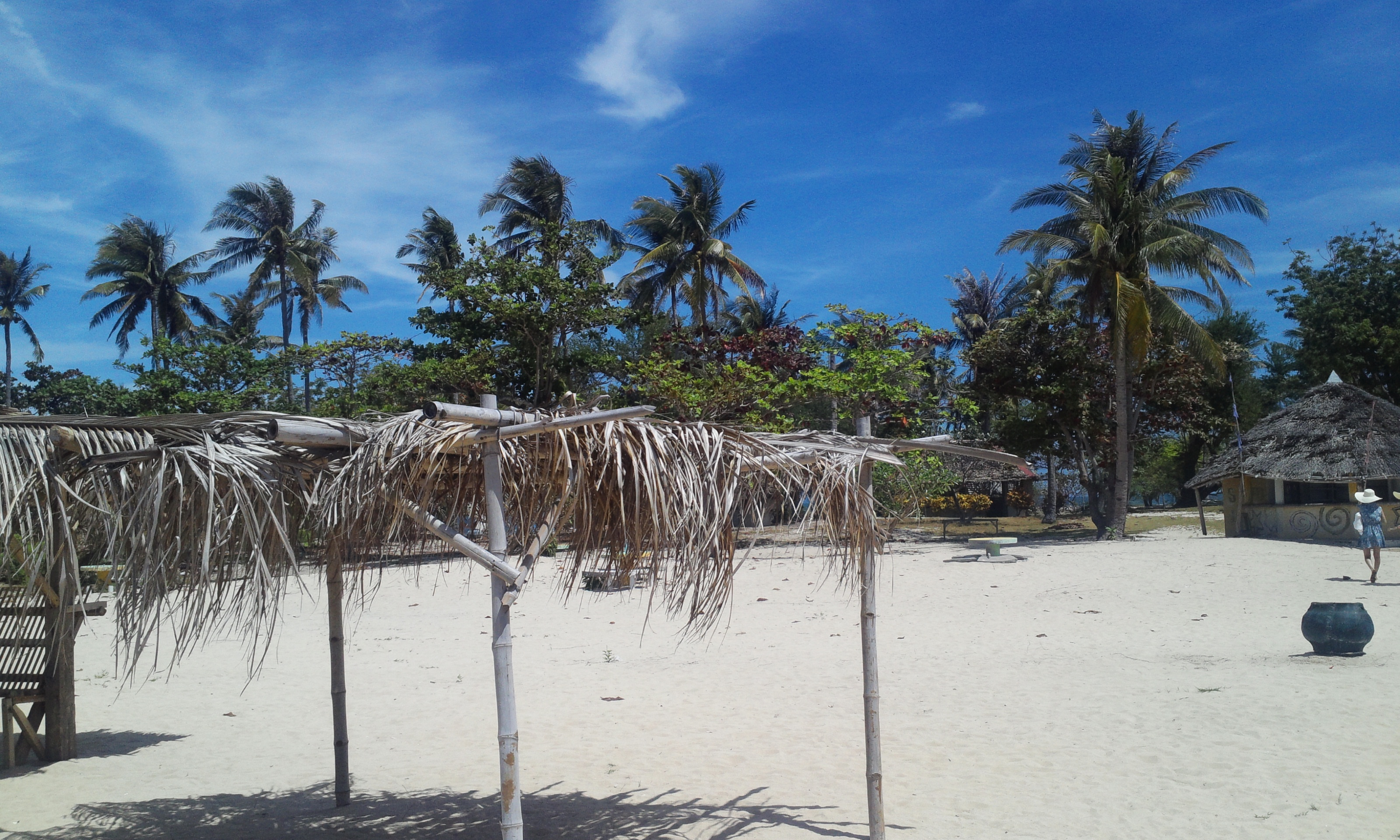
The island resort of Lakawon is part of Barangay Cadiz Viejo

The old seal of Cadiz, still registered by the NHCP

Cadiz is located at the northern part of Negros Occidental, 63 kilometres (39 mi) away from the provincial capital of Bacolod. The city is bounded to the north by the Visayan Sea, to the south by Silay City and Victorias City, to the east by Sagay City and to the west by the municipality of Manapla. It is located within the geographical coordinates of 10 degrees and 50 mins. Latitude NE and 125 degrees and 9 mins. longitude E.

The total land area by land use is 52,457 hectares. An area of 7,354.59 hectares is classified as urban land, which includes residential, commercial, industrial and institutional. 45,102.45 hectares are rural.

The city has reclaimed an area of 38 hectares, 500 meters southeast of City Hall. This area is found alongside of Hitalon River and is ideal for industrial activities.

=== Barangays ===
Cadiz is politically subdivided into 22 barangays. Each barangay consists of puroks and some have sitios.

- Andres Bonifacio
- Banquerohan
- Barangay 1 Pob. (Zone 1)
- Barangay 2 Pob. (Zone 2)
- Barangay 3 Pob. (Zone 3)
- Barangay 4 Pob. (Zone 4)
- Barangay 5 Pob. (Zone 5)
- Barangay 6 Pob. (Zone 6)
- Burgos
- Cabahug
- Cadiz Viejo
- Caduha-an
- Celestino Villacin
- Daga
- V. F. Gustilo
- Jerusalem
- Luna
- Mabini
- Magsaysay
- Sicaba
- Tiglawigan
- Tinampa-an

=== Climate ===
Climate data for Cadiz, Negros Occidental
| Month | Jan | Feb | Mar | Apr | May | Jun | Jul | Aug | Sep | Oct | Nov | Dec | Year |
|---|---|---|---|---|---|---|---|---|---|---|---|---|---|
| Mean daily maximum °C (°F) | 28 (82) | 29 (84) | 30 (86) | 32 (90) | 31 (88) | 30 (86) | 29 (84) | 30 (86) | 29 (84) | 29 (84) | 29 (84) | 28 (82) | 30 (85) |
| Mean daily minimum °C (°F) | 23 (73) | 23 (73) | 23 (73) | 24 (75) | 25 (77) | 25 (77) | 25 (77) | 25 (77) | 25 (77) | 24 (75) | 24 (75) | 24 (75) | 24 (75) |
| Average precipitation mm (inches) | 120 (4.7) | 87 (3.4) | 95 (3.7) | 97 (3.8) | 187 (7.4) | 263 (10.4) | 251 (9.9) | 220 (8.7) | 227 (8.9) | 268 (10.6) | 220 (8.7) | 158 (6.2) | 2,193 (86.4) |
| Average rainy days | 16.1 | 12.6 | 15.4 | 16.8 | 25.8 | 28.4 | 29.1 | 27.9 | 27.7 | 28.5 | 23.9 | 18.4 | 270.6 |
Source: Meteoblue

== Demographics ==
Population census of Cadiz
| Year | Pop. | ±% p.a. |
|---|---|---|
| 1903 | 16,429 | — |
| 1918 | 22,183 | +2.02% |
| 1939 | 41,905 | +3.08% |
| 1948 | 48,960 | +1.74% |
| 1960 | 88,542 | +5.06% |
| 1970 | 124,108 | +3.43% |
| 1975 | 127,653 | +0.57% |
| 1980 | 129,632 | +0.31% |
| 1990 | 119,772 | −0.79% |
| 1995 | 125,943 | +0.95% |
| 2000 | 141,954 | +2.60% |
| 2007 | 150,750 | +0.83% |
| 2010 | 151,500 | +0.18% |
| 2015 | 154,723 | +0.40% |
| 2020 | 158,544 | +0.51% |
| 2024 | 161,558 | +0.45% |
Source: Philippine Statistics Authority

=== Language ===
Hiligaynon is the major language of the city, with differences in tone and accent from the Hiligaynon used in Metro Bacolod. It is also mixed with a few Cebuano and Spanish words. Tagalog and English are widely taught but seldom used, however, both are frequently used in the academe and businesses.

== Economy ==
Poverty incidence of Cadiz (%)

Source: Philippine Statistics Authority

The total annual income of the city for the year under review is P429,389,619. It is derived from the actual collections of local revenues and Internal Revenue Allotment (IRA).

The city has a total number of 4,965 business establishments, in which 4,750 of which are classified as commercial and 215 as industrial. It has 11 pawnshops, 16 lending corporation and five banking institutions which provide financial capital to businessmen.

The principal sources of livelihood are agriculture and fishing, with employment and business as a secondary source of income.

Cadiz has a total agricultural area of 36,475.7429 hectares. Sugarcane remains as the prime agricultural commodity with as large as 23,571.1445 hectares or 64.5242% of the total agricultural area.

Fish supply is more than what the city currently needs. Being rich in natural resources and considered as one of the few fishing centers of Negros Occidental, Cadiz, rich in marine resources, is envisioned to be the seafood center of Negros and an alternative tourist destination. In Barangays Daga and Tiglawigan, for instance, dried fish processing and boat building are the major economic activities.

A P37 million multi-purpose seaport, still under construction, is envisioned to encourage both fishing and commercial vessels to dock in and use the area for trade and industry. This nationally funded seaport would create more jobs in the city.

So far, four companies (San Miguel Corp., Pepsi Cola, Coca-Cola and Jaz Cola) have established their distribution centers within the city.

Also located in the city is the Cadiz Solar Power Plant.

== Government ==
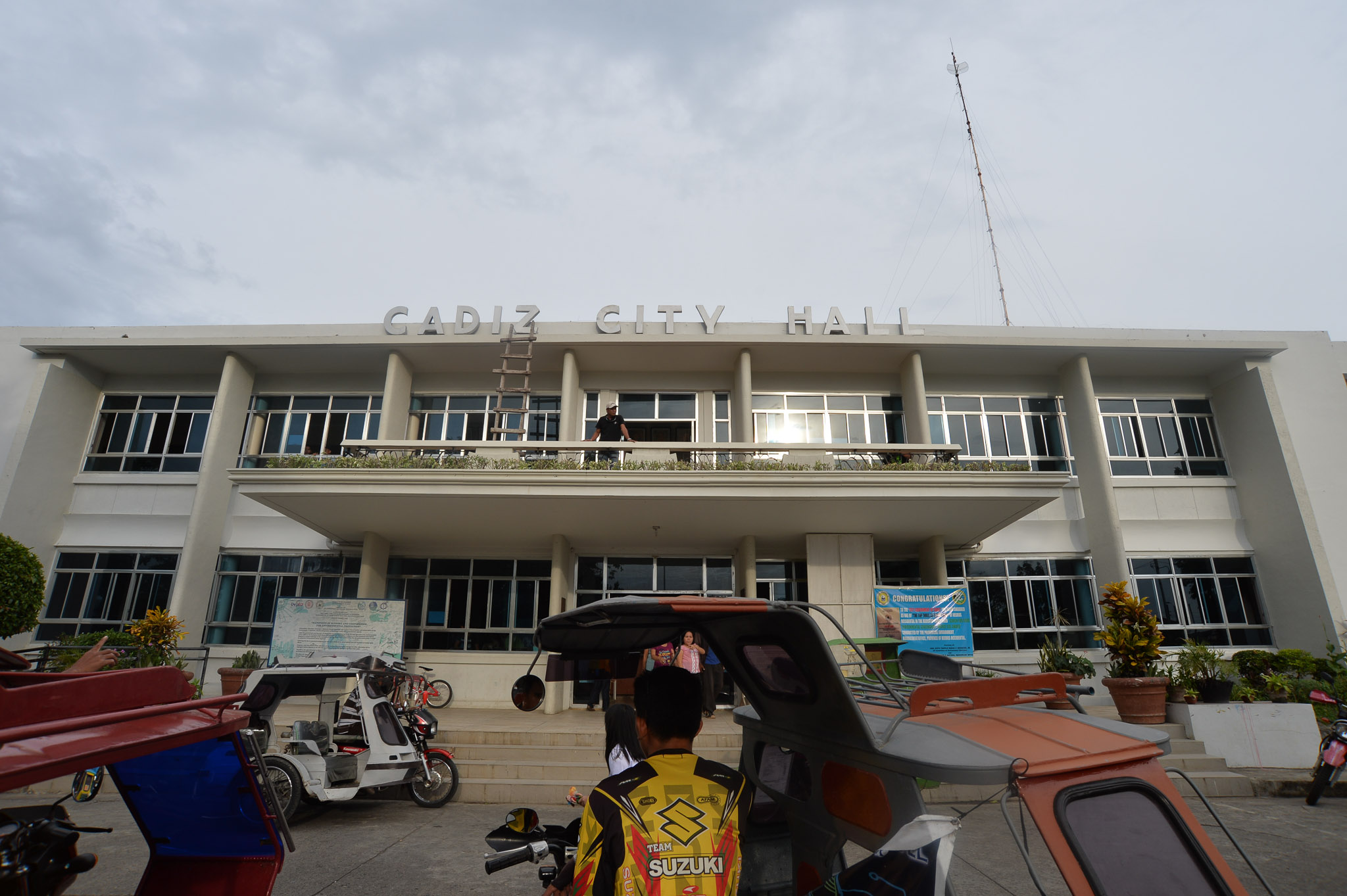
The new Cadiz City Hall

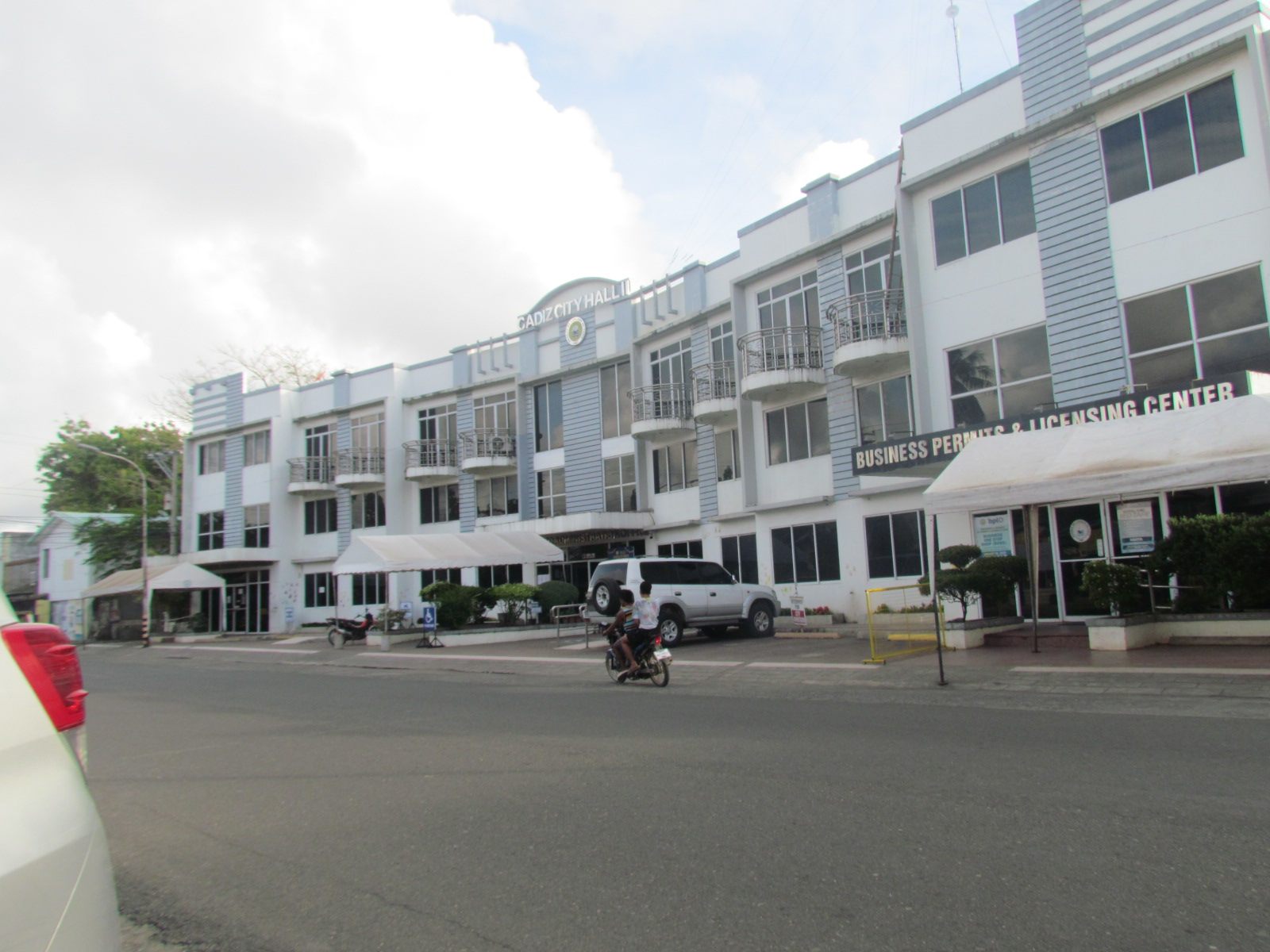
The new Cadiz City Hall building 2

=== Elected officials ===
Member of the Cadiz City Council (2025–2028):

| Office | Name |
|---|---|
| City Mayor's Office | Salvador G. Escalante |
| City Vice Mayor / SP Office | Vincent Escalante |
| Councilors | Fria Cervantes; Claire Consing; Pauline Decolongon; Maricel Desuyo; Judge Frances Guanzon; Kathrina Gustilo; Lalen Lamis; Marlon Metoda; CJ Olvido; William Tabano |

=== List of former municipal captains, municipal presidents, town and city mayors ===
| Year | Mayor |
|---|---|
| 1878-1879 | Antonio Cabahug |
| 1879-1880 | Mamerto Vito |
| 1880-1882 | Luis Vito |
| 1882-1884 | Pedro de los Santos |
| 1884-1885 | Ceferino de los Santos |
| 1885-1886 | Procopio Abelarde |
| 1887-188 | Quintin Barilea |
| 1889-1890 | Carlos Lazaro |
| 1890-1892 | Gil Javier |
| 1892-1894 | Tomas Belmonte |
| 1894-1895 | Gil Lopez Villanueva |
| 1896-1897 | Mateo Lazaro |
| 1898-1900 | José Lopez Vito |
| 1900-1901 | Miguel Araullo |
| 1902-1903 | Francisco Abelarde |
| 1904-1905 | Amado Panes |
| 1906-1907 | Fermin Belmonte |
| 1908-1911 | Ildefonso Monfort |
| 1912-1915 | Catalino Delos Santos |
| 1916-1918 | Fermin Belmonte |
| 1919-1921 | Emilio Rodriguez |
| 1922-1931 | Carlos Magalona |
| 1932-1935 | Agustin Javier |
| 1935-1942 | Pedro Villena |
| 1942-1945 | Manuel Escalante |
| 1945-1946 | Pedro Villena |
| 1947-1955 | Joaquin Ledesma |
| 1955-1975 | Heracleo Villacin, Sr. |
| 1975-1983 | Pedro Ramos, Sr. |
| 1983-1986 | Prudencio Olvido |
| 1986-1992 | Rowena V. Guanzon |
| 1992-1994 | Vicente Tabanao |
| 1994-2001 | Eduardo Varela |
| 2001-2010 | Salvador Escalante, Jr. |
| 2010–2019 | Patrick G. Escalante, M.D. |
| 2019–present | Salvador Escalante, Jr. |

== Infrastructure ==
=== Protective services ===
As of 2007, the city has 54 policemen serving its 150,750 citizens. The existing policemen-population ratio is 1:2,792 - above the standard ratio of 1:1,000. This necessitates that the city police force employs 97 more policemen.

The Philippine National Police has one headquarter located at the Villa Cristina Subdivision and 6 community police unit precincts located at Barangay Daga, Barangay Banquerohan, the Public Market, Fara-on Institute, Lacawon Island and Barangay Tiglawigan. There are 3 patrol vehicles and 3 motorcycles being utilized by the police force.

Considering that the police force ratio to the populace is not sufficient, the Civilian Volunteers Organization (CVO) was created to augment the policemen. Today, there are 40 members of CVO serving alongside the policemen of the city.

The city has 62 traffic enforcers helping policemen direct and control the traffic flow. The city planned to hire additional traffic enforcers by 2008.

There are three PA Detachments operating in the rural barangays with the main patrol base located at Had. Buenretiro, Barangay Burgos, I PA Special Detachment at Had. Bjormaine, Barangay Magsaysay and I PA Detachment at Had. Ladnon in Barangay Caduha-an.

As of 2007, the Bureau of Jail Management and Penology has 8 personnel and 126 inmates. It is located in Barangay Tinampaan.

The Bureau of Fire Protection, as of 2026, has 3 serviceable fire trucks and 1 Ambulance. 1 Commissioned Officer,9 Non-Commissioned Officer, 2 Non-Uniformed Personnel and 10 local employees.The ratio is 1:6,226. This is higher than the standard 1 fireman per 2,000 population. Inferring from this, the city needs 80 more firemen and personnel. The development of the Busac-Busac Spring, the city has 23 serviceable fire hydrants located at different strategic locations.

=== Transportation and communication ===
Cadiz is a one-hour drive from Bacolod City, the capital of Negros Occidental, by private car and an hour and fifteen minutes ride by a passenger bus. The Vallacar Transit (Ceres), the largest bus company, has a terminal here. Buses plying to San Carlos, Dumaguete, and the nearby municipalities make short stopovers here. Other services of transportations available are PUJ and van for hire vehicles. Cadiz is also accessible to Cebu via the cities of San Carlos and Escalante. Passenger buses for Cebu also pass by at the bus terminal on scheduled trips.

The existence of communication facilities in any area plays a vital role in economic development. These facilities lessen the cost of transportation and likewise shorten the time in transacting business. Cadiz has a Bureau of Telecommunications and a post Office located at the City Engineer's Compound. There is also an air cargo service in the city. Two private companies, the JRS and LBC, also deliver mail. Unlike the post office, home mail delivery of these private companies reaches the rural areas.

The Cadiz Post Office has only two mail carriers and seven office personnel, including the postmaster. The recommended ratio between letter carriers and the population is 1:5,000. With the projected population of 161,393 in 2005, the current ratio between letter carriers and population is placed at 1:80,696. The city needs to hire 30 additional personnel to meet the requirement of 32 letter carriers. The population is estimated to be 165,589 in 2006; hence, an additional of 31 letter carriers will be needed to meet the new requirement of 33 letter carriers.

Two telephone companies operate in the city, the Philippine Long Distance telephone Company located along Villena Street with a capacity of 1,500 lines and the Globe Fiber Optic Backbone Network support facility located along Cabahug Street. Cellular sites of Smart, Globe and Sun are also found in the city to cater for the wireless telephone system. The city has also five internet cafes.

Cadiz has one satellite cable station. COMSATEL Cable TV located at San Eusebio Subdivision, Barangay Zone 2. It caters to six urban barangays, including parts of Barangay Daga and offers 45 channels to choose from. By using ordinary antennas, 3 television channels (12, 6 and 4) are viewed and received.

The city has one FM radio station located at Villa Barbas, Barangay Zone 2, with a broadcast power of 104.5 kHz. Cadiz also receives broadcasts from stations in Bacolod, Manila, Cebu, Iloilo and other nearby provinces or towns and cities. The broadcasts are either in English, Hiligaynon, Cebuano and Filipino.

National newspapers available in the city include the Malaya Daily Express, Bulletin Today, Philippine Daily Inquirer, Time Journal, Tempo, The Philippine Star, and Bandera. Local dailies include Negros Daily Bulletin, Sunstar and the Visayan Daily Star. The City Government of Cadiz also has the quarterly Cadiz Bulletin and the monthly Bulletin.

==== By sea ====
There used to be two ferry boats of private company transporting cargoes and passengers to and from Bantayan Island.

== Healthcare ==
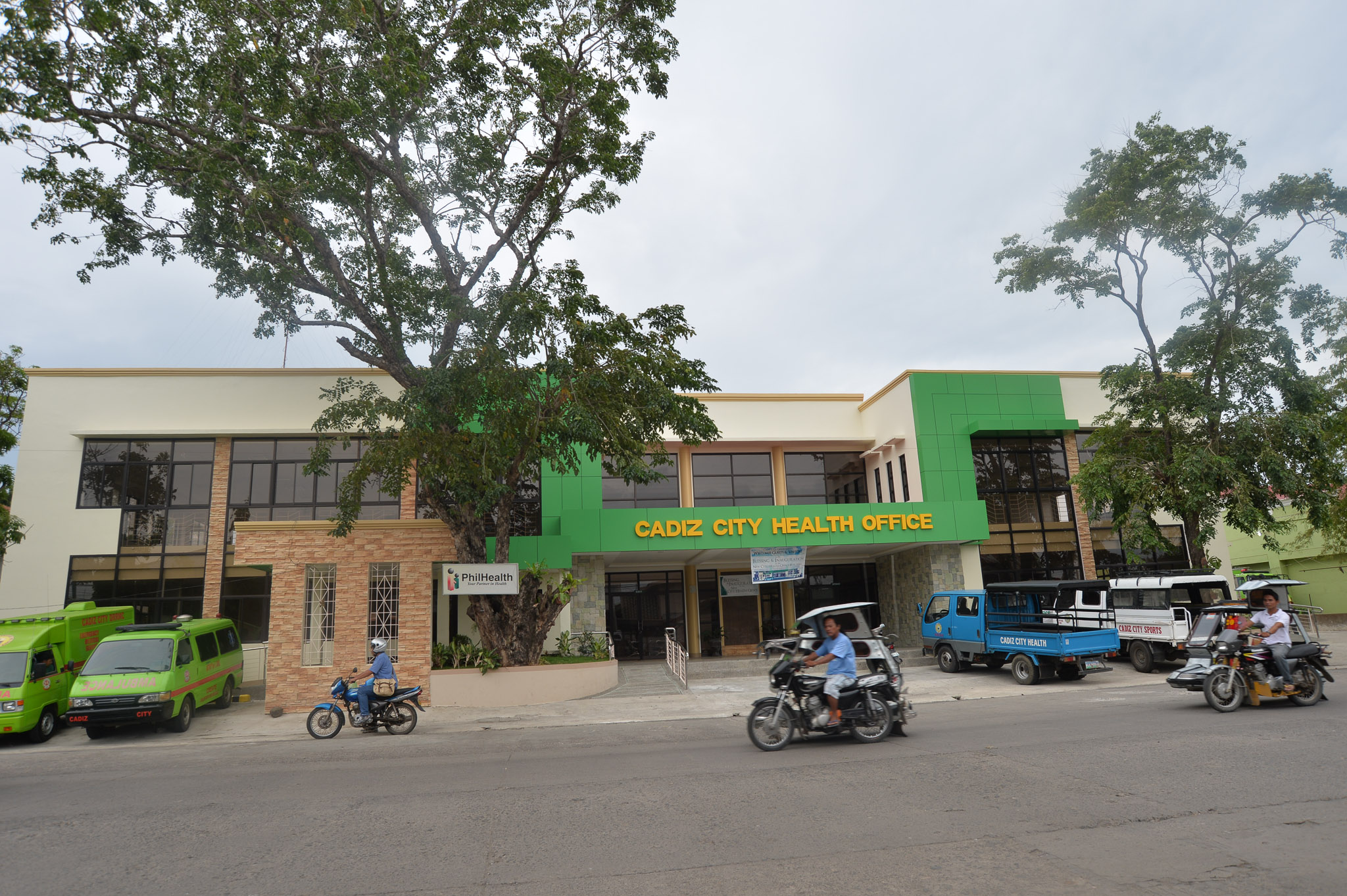
Cadiz Health Office

The government health facilities of the city consist of a district hospital with 50 beds, an emergency clinic with 5 beds and 2 extension beds, a city health clinic, 22 Barangay health centers, and 43 school clinics. There are 5 private medical clinics, 3 private family planning clinics, 2 private optical clinics and 3 private clinical laboratories. The government's x-ray clinic and dental clinic further support the health facilities of the city. There are seven drugstores, two of which are open 24 hours a day.

== Education ==
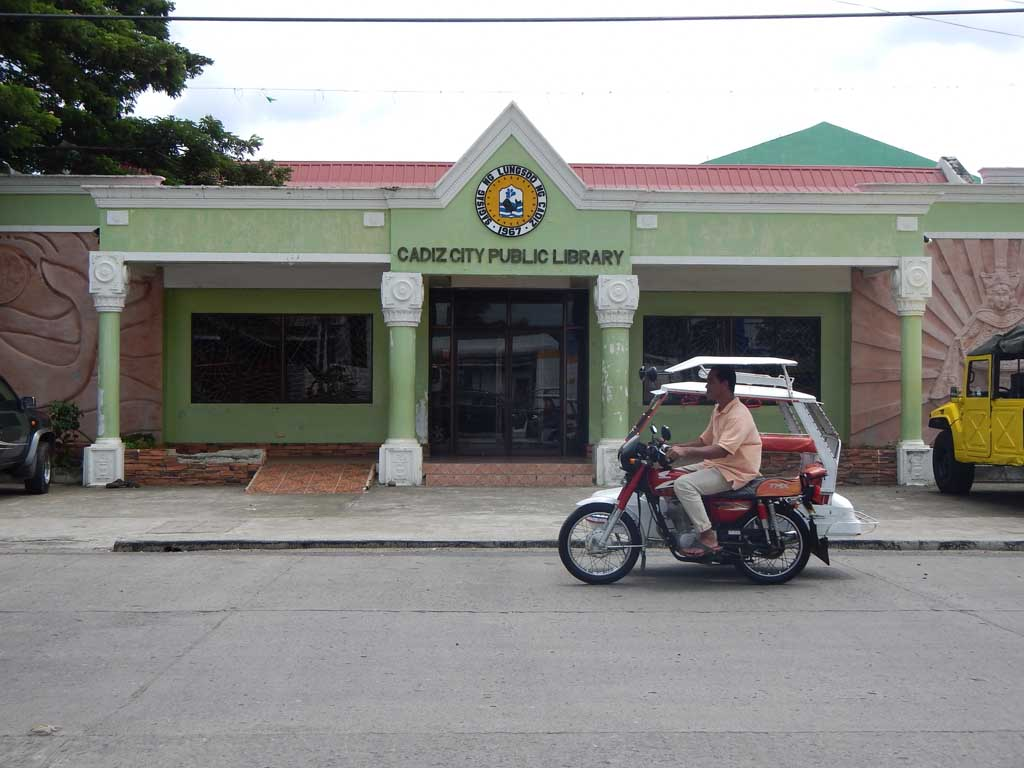
Front view of the Cadiz public library on Cabahug Street

Elementary

- Cadiz West I Elementary School
- Cadiz West II Elementary School
- Cadiz East I Elementary School
- Northern Negros Private School
- Philippine Normal University (PNU Visayas Campus)
- Holy Infant Academy
- SPED Training Center
- Manuel J. Escalante Elementary School

High school

- Philippine Normal University (PNU Visayas Campus)
- SPED High School
- Holy Infant Academy
- Dr. Vicente F. Gustilo Memorial National High School
- Cadiz Viejo National High School
- Caduha-an National High School
- Sicaba National High School
- Tiglawigan National High School
- Villacin National High School

College

- North Negros College
- CEDAR College, Inc.
- Philippine Normal University (PNU Visayas Campus)
- LaSalTech, Inc. - Cadiz
- Northern Negros State College of Science and Technology - Cadiz Campus
- Technological University of the Philippines Visayas, Cadiz Extension Campus

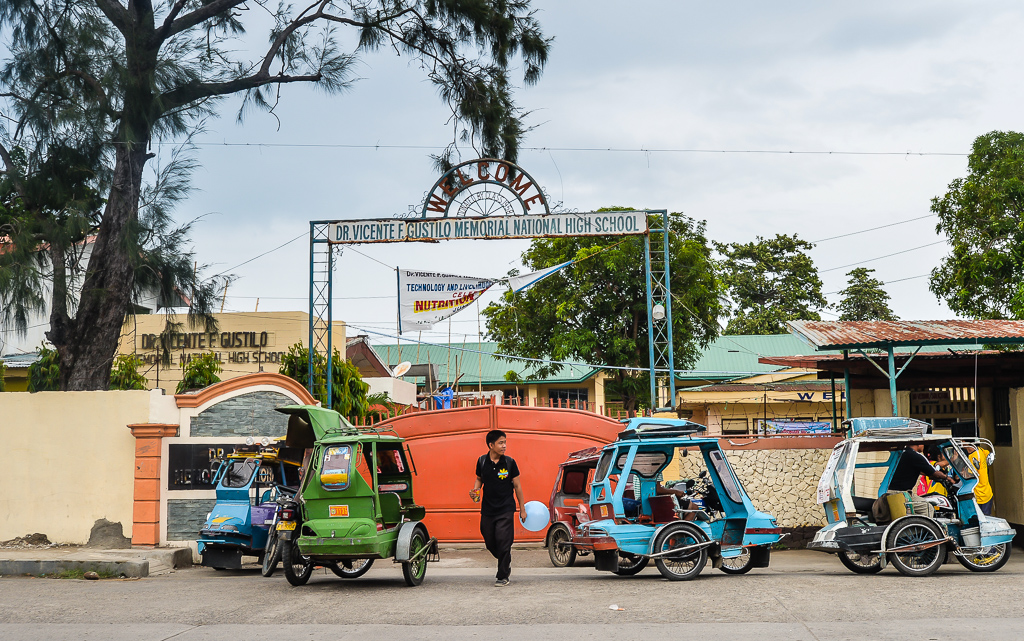
Dr. Vicente F. Gustilo Memorial National High School - One of the entrance gates

Cadiz has 76 educational institutions that offer elementary, secondary and tertiary education. 67 are public schools, eight are private, and one is a state-owned university. Out of the 67 public schools, 51 offer elementary education and 16 offer secondary education. Out of eight private schools, four offer elementary education, one offers secondary and elementary, one offers solely secondary, one offers business education and vocational courses, and one offers a computer technology course. The state-owned university offers elementary, secondary and tertiary (BS in Elementary Education, BS in Secondary Education and master's degree in Education) courses.

There are also nine private preparatory schools: Cadiz Evangelical Church Kindergarten School, Northern Negros Private School, Alpha-Omega Christian School, Seventh Day Adventist Elementary School, PNU Early Childhood Education, Kiddie's Joy Kinder School, Solid Ground Christian Academy, Cadiz Christian Learning Center and Creativity School. The seven public preparatory schools are the Cadiz East Elementary Schools 1 and 2, Cadiz West II Elementary School, Villacin Elementary School, Bayabas Elementary School, Don Luis Consing Elementary School and Caduha-an Elementary School.

== Gallery ==
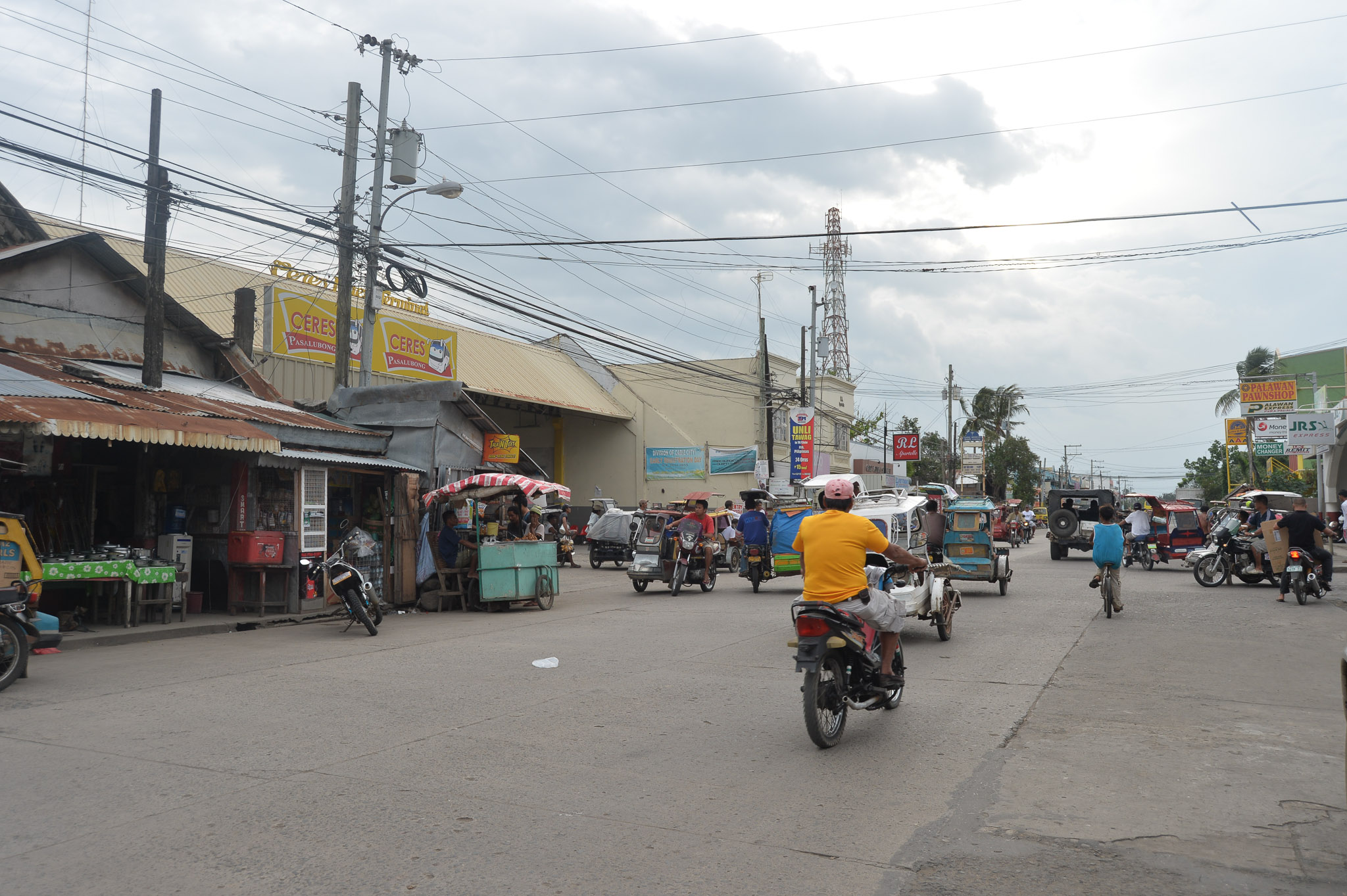
Villena St., One of the major streets in Cadiz

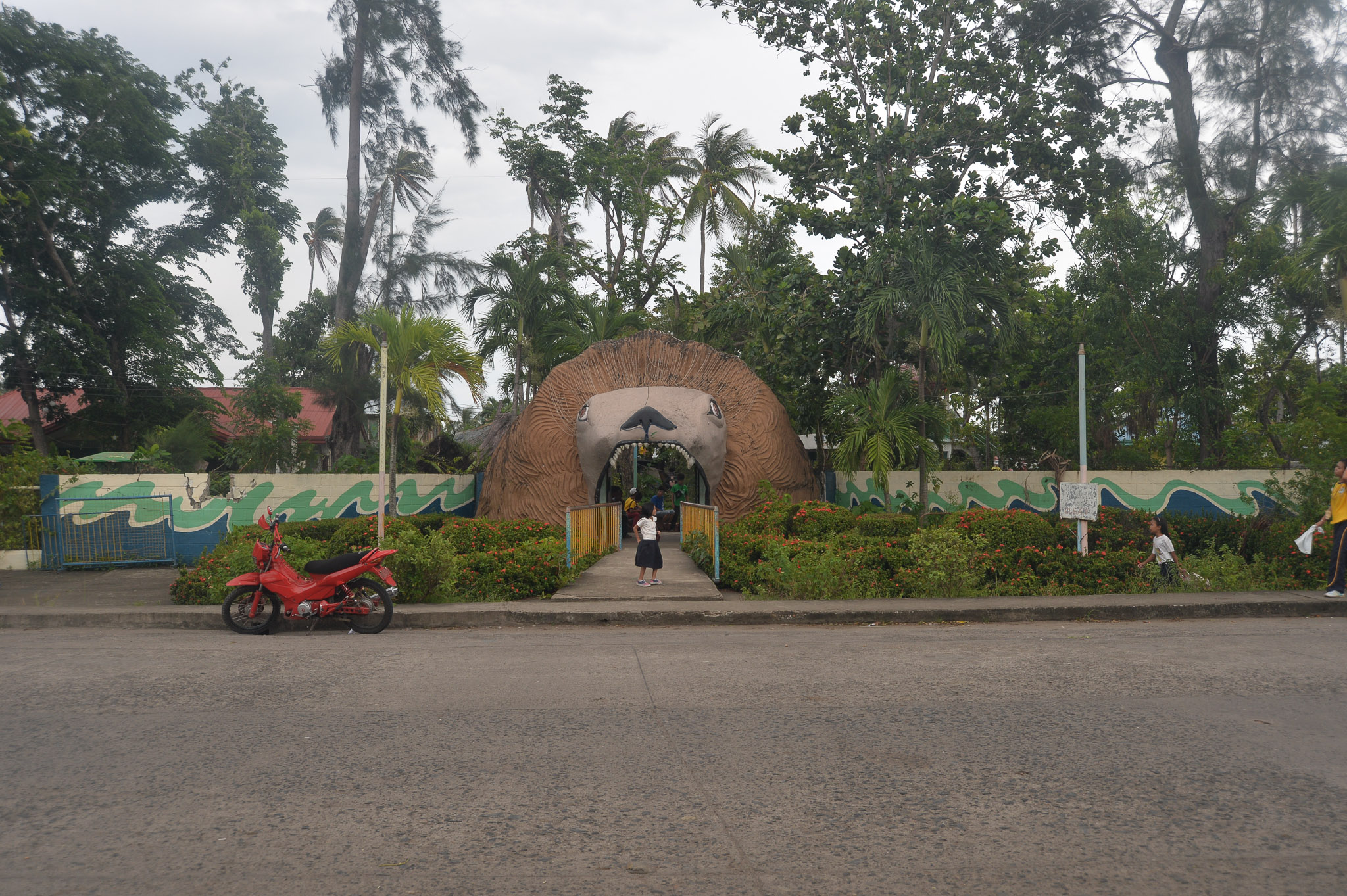
Cadiz children's playground

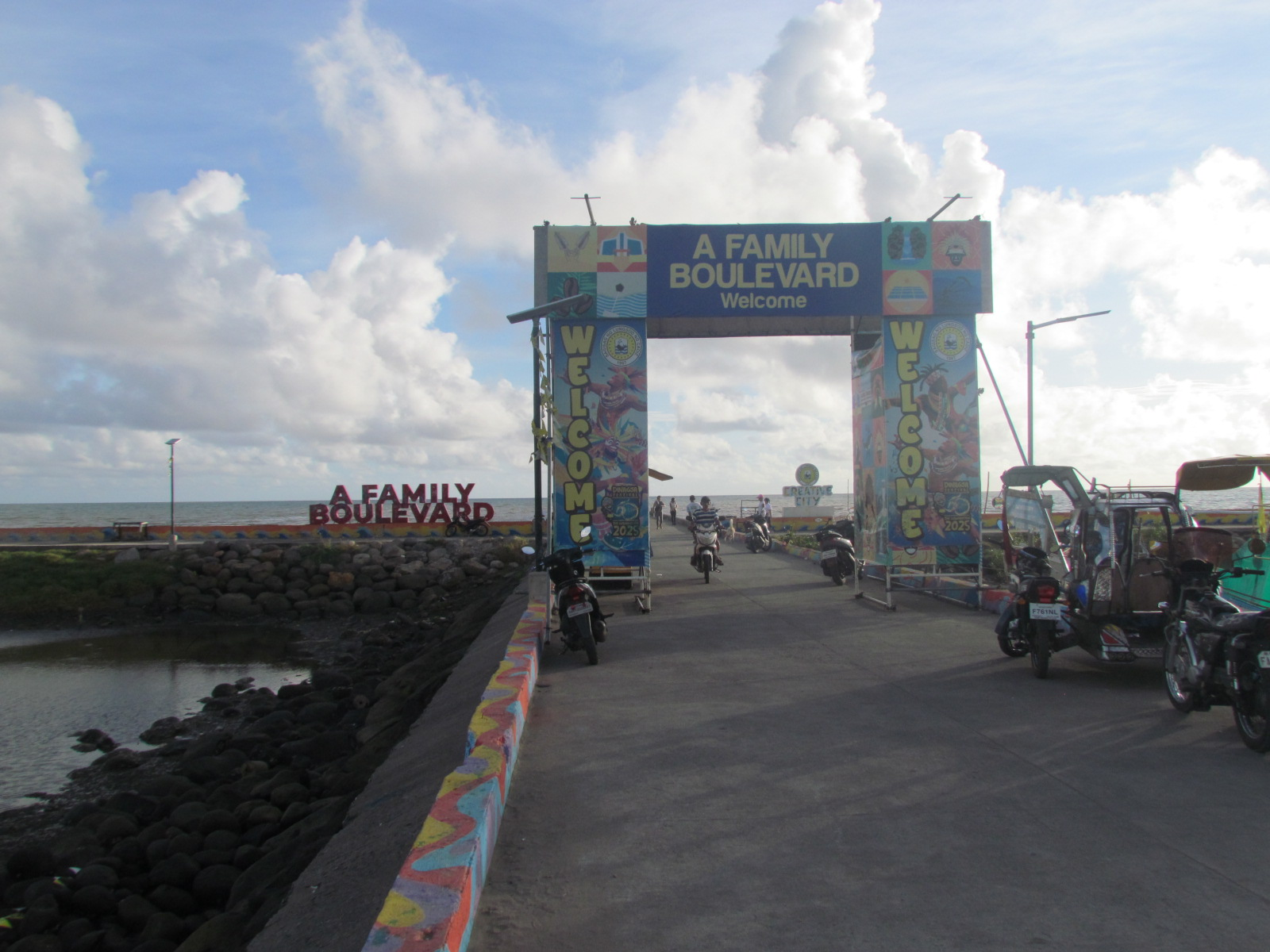
Cadiz wharf - "A Family Boulevard"

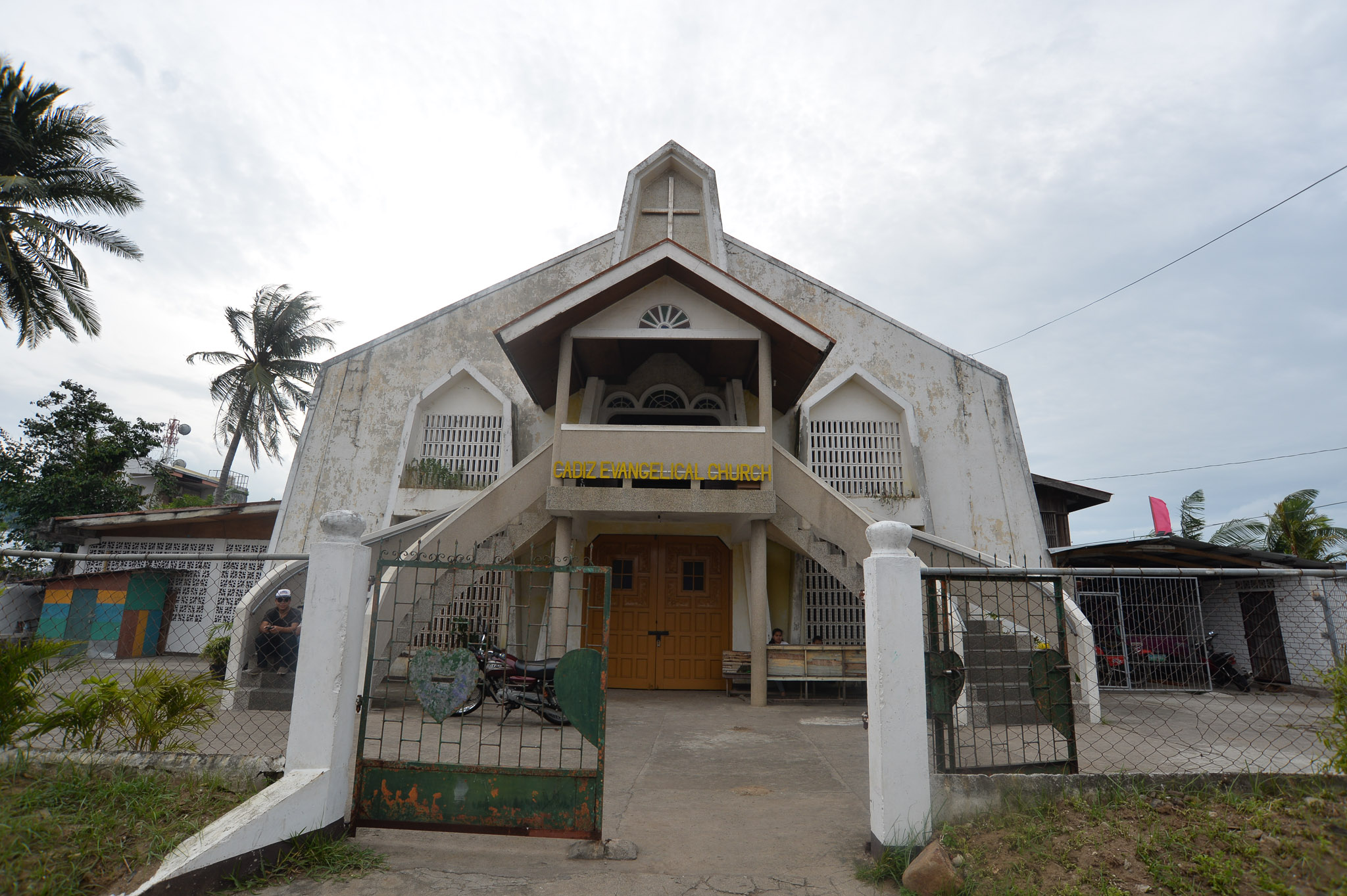
Evangelical Church in Cadiz

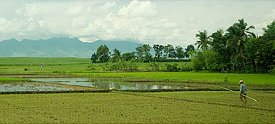
Rice fields with Mount Silay as background, taken from the Cadiz highway

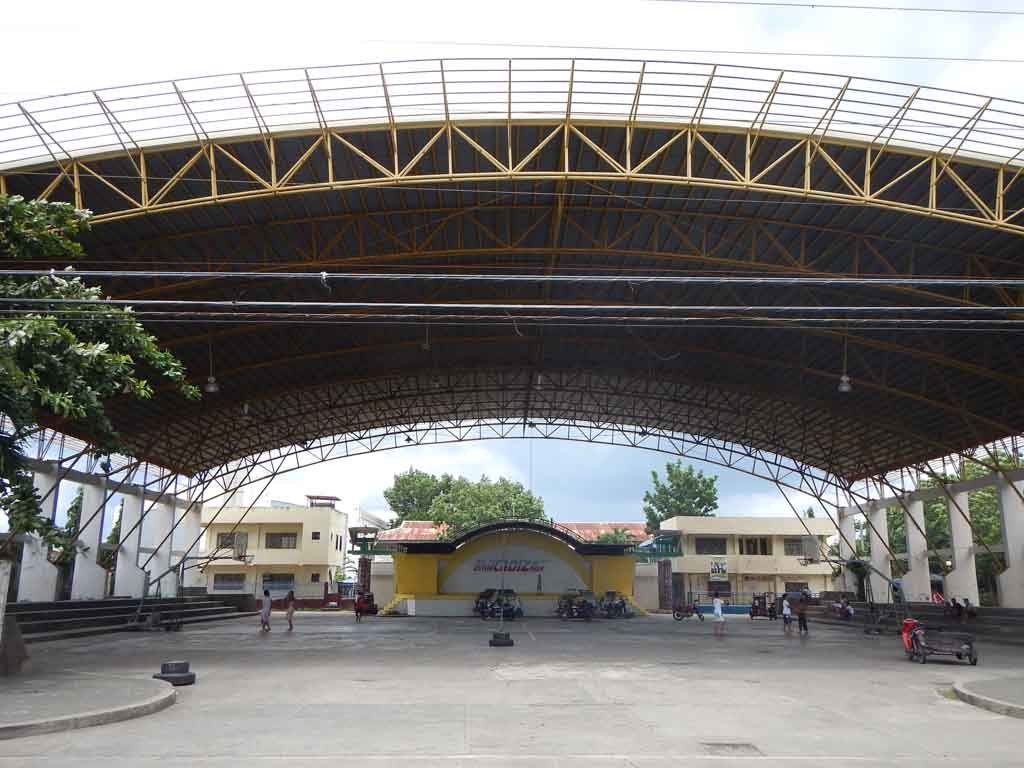
Covered gym near Santo Niño Parish Church

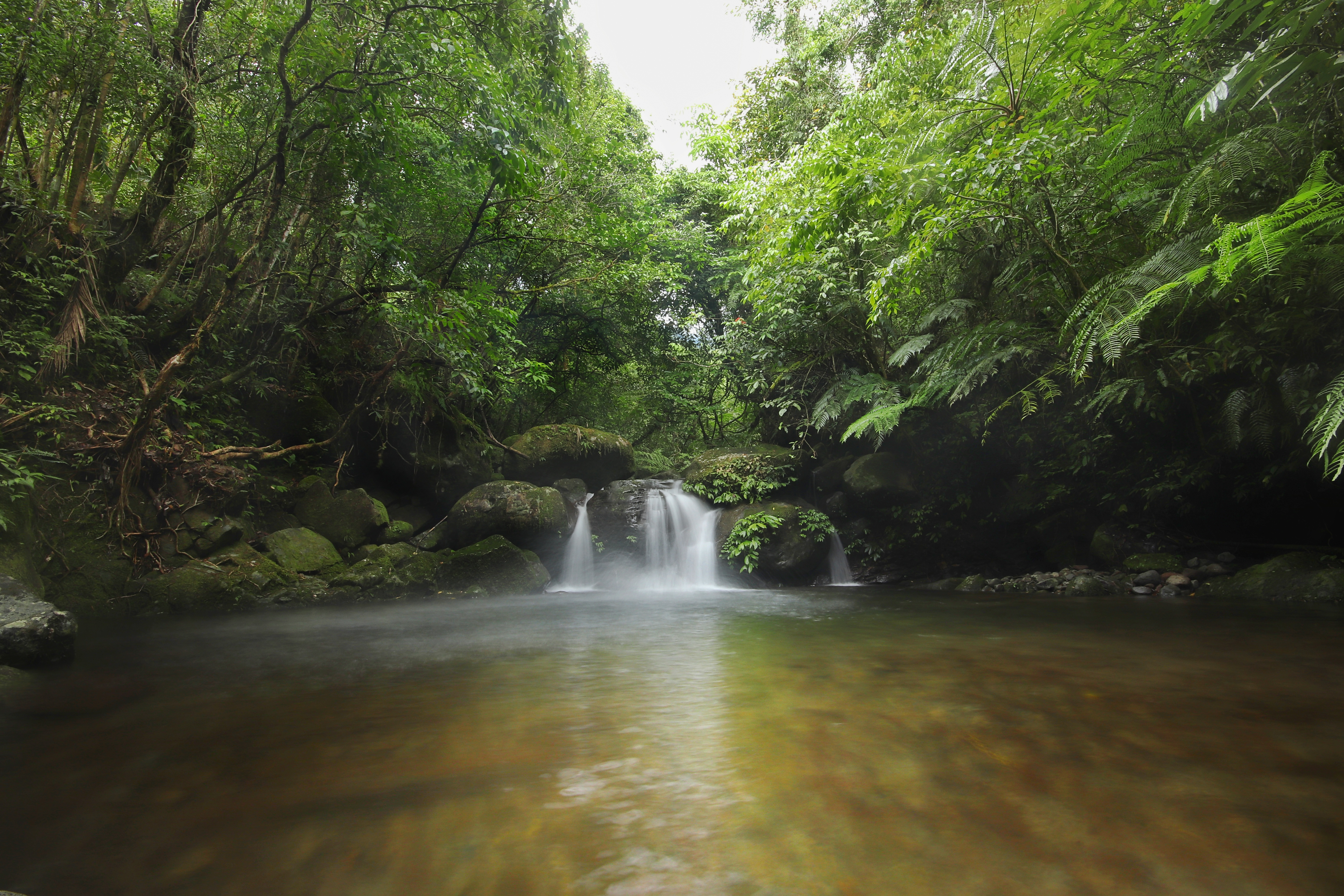
Falls in Sitio Alimatoc, Barangay Celestino Villacin

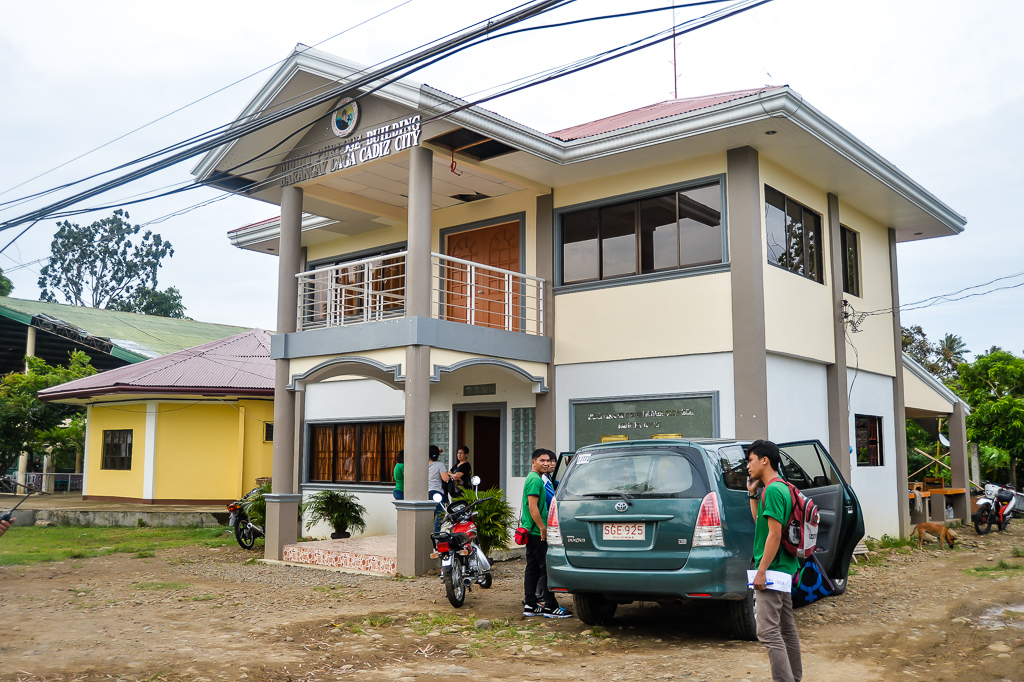
Newly built Barangay Hall at Daga, Cadiz City

== Notable people ==
- Jose Vasquez Aguilar -Educator, 1st filipino recipient of the Ramon Magsaysay Award (Considered as the Nobel Prize of Asia)
- John Becaro - Illustrator and Visual Artist
- Rowena Guanzon - Mayor of Cadiz, Commissioner of the Commission on Audit, Commissioner of the Commission on Elections (Philippines)
- Christiani Rebada - Singer/Songwriter and Vocal Coach
- Amy Lazaro-Javier - Associate Justice of the Supreme Court of the Philippines
