= HMS Cadiz =

Two ships of the British Royal Navy have been named HMS Cadiz:

- The first Cadiz was a fire ship purchased in 1688 and expended in 1692 at the Battle of Barfleur.
- The second HMS Cadiz (D79), launched in 1944, was a Battle-class destroyer. She was transferred to the Pakistani Navy in 1957 and renamed Khaibar.
