= Negros Occidental High School =

Public high school in Bacolod, Philippines

Location
- Bacolod, Negros Occidental; Philippines
- 10°39′44″N 122°56′38″E

Information
- Former names: Rizal Institute, Bacolod High School
- Type: Public
- Religious affiliation: Secular
- Established: July 1, 1902 (124 years and 31 days)
- Principal: Cheryl J. Tondo
- Campus: Urban
- Color
- Nickname: Provincial High School

Negros Occidental High School is a public secondary educational institution and oldest public secondary school in the province located in Bacolod, Negros Occidental, in the Philippines that was founded since 1902. The school currently offers various curriculum: Special Program in Science Technology, Engineering and Mathematics (STEM) for the Special Science Class, Basic Education Curriculum for the Regular Class, Special Program for the Arts, Special Program in Journalism, Special Class in Culture and Sports and the Basic Education Curriculum for the Night Class. The Negros Occidental High School had an Extension campus in Murcia, Negros Occidental and later on changed its name to Murcia National High School

== History ==
The foundation for the establishment of a Provincial High School in Negros Occidental was already laid in 1901 by the Division Superintendent, George W. Beattie, so that when Act 372 of the Philippine Commission was passed on March 7, 1901, empowering the Provincial Boards of the country to provide funds for the erection or renting and other expenses for a secondary school in the province, Beattie was ready for implementation of the plan, including the hiring of teachers in time for the opening of the school on July 1, 1902.

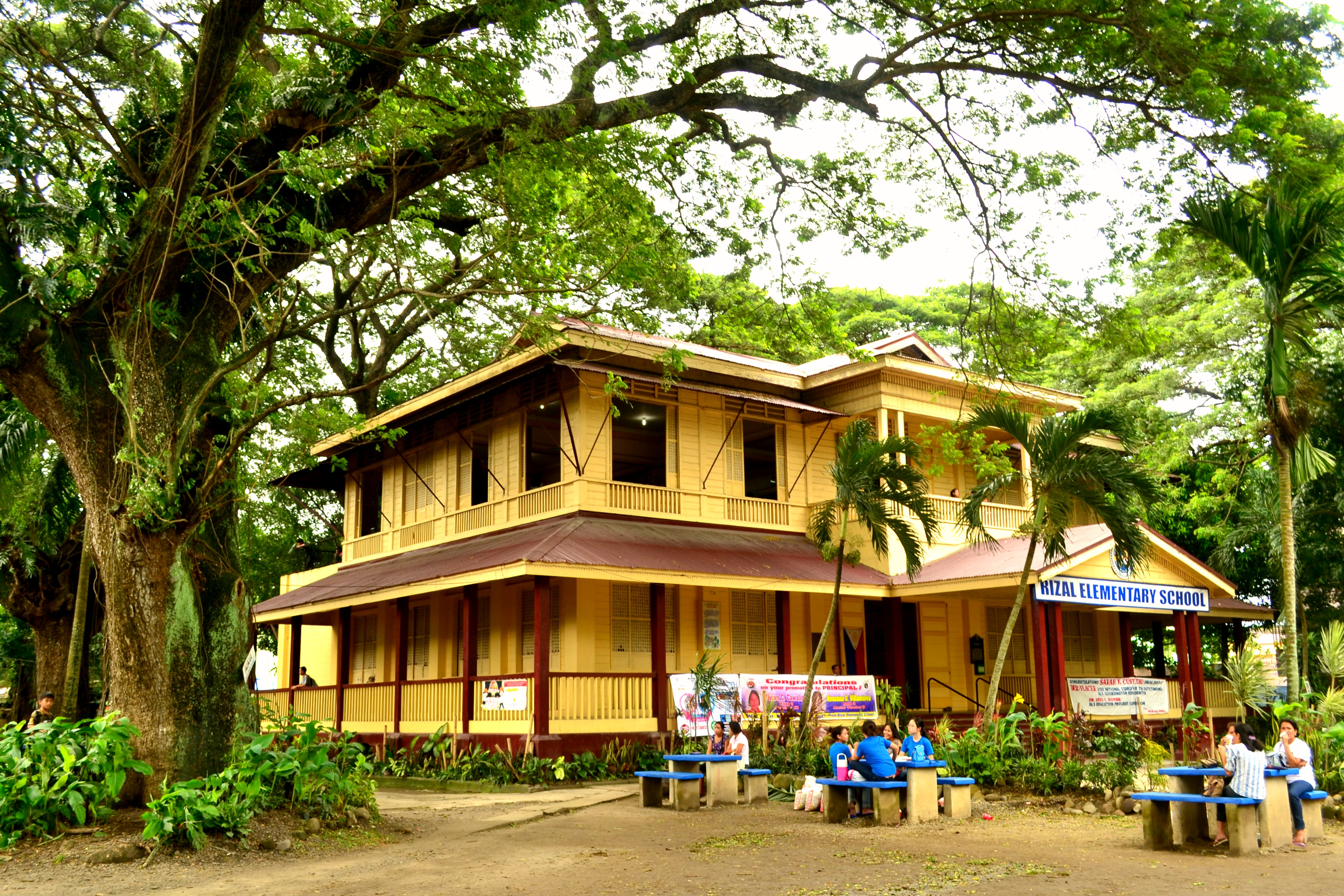
Rizal Elementary School gabaldon building where the Rizal Institute (currently NOHS) was founded

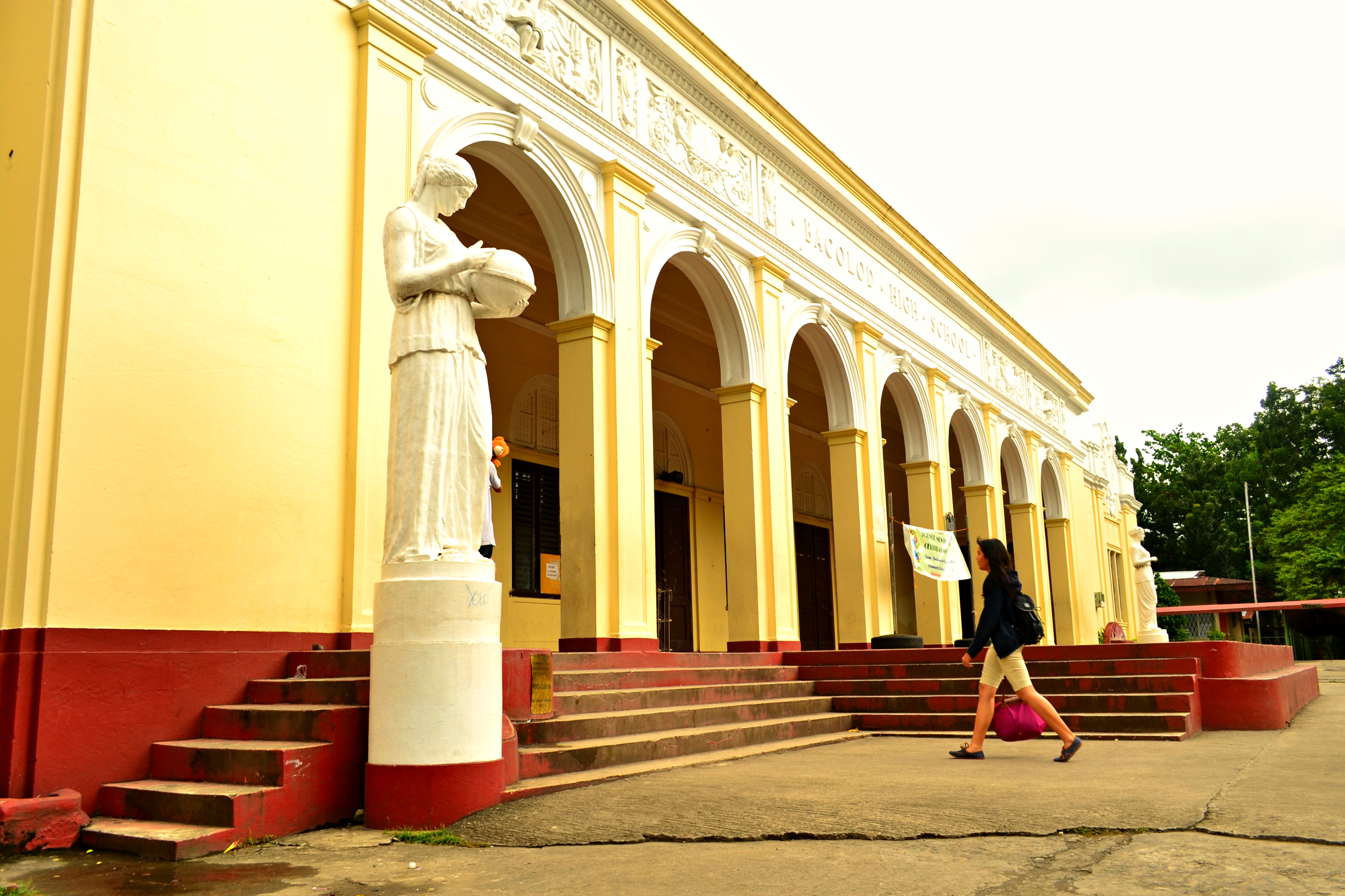
Negros Occidental High School facade

Sometime in 1902, former leaders of the Republica de Negros, Ex-minister of Justice Antonio Ledesma Jayme and Ex-provincial Governor Melecio Severino exerted efforts for the opening of a secondary school in Occidental Negros which they named Instituto Rizal, now Negros Occidental High School. The Rizal Elementary School was first founded in Bacolod City as "Instituto de Rizal" by Severino and Jayme. However Severino was an avowed nationalist, and was still governor of the province until May 1, 1901, so that his role in the creation of the school was important. Jayme was Severino's rival for governor on the election of 1899, and his house was rented for the first classrooms and dormitories for the Institute. It is possible that they were instrumental in helping the Division Superintendent and in naming the school Instituto Rizal.

By the opening of the school in 1902, there were three teachers and 125 students taking academic and normal courses in Instituto Rizal.

The establishment of the Instituto Rizal was not smooth. As of June 1902, only the Provincial Treasurer of the Provincial Board was favorable to the school idea but the Governor (Leandro Locsin) was "indifferent and the supervisor was avowed hostile". However the idea of a high school was pushed through because the supervisor was not a member of the Provincial Board and the Treasurer was an American who held sway in the Provincial Board.

Instituto Rizal was renting two spacious buildings for classrooms and separate dormitories for boy and girls who reside outside Bacolod City. Mr. Ray Howell was the school principal. By July 1903, Instituto Rizal had already four teachers with an average attendance of 166 students, an increase of 100 as compare to the attendance of the previous year. The school was closed from September 7 to November 10, 1902, because of a cholera epidemic.

Instituto Rizal became Rizal Institute in compliance with Executive Order No. 44, series of 1912, which mandated English as the official language of the Philippines, starting January 1, 1913, the school authorities were prompted to officially adopt the name Rizal Institute. Don Antonio Jayme, who owned lands and houses in Bacolod, provided the first classrooms and dormitories of the school, which were rented using funds allocated by the provincial board.

In 1927, the permanent high school building was constructed at the present site. The construction was finished about 1931. When classes were transferred to the newly constructed building in September 1931, the name inscribed in the building facade read, "Bacolod High School". This was because in the public works program under the Appropriations Act of 1927, the name appearing was: "the construction of the Bacolod High School". However, the name was never officially used, instead the name Negros Occidental High School was used in all communications. NOGCHS In 1970, NOHS was drastically changed to Negros Occidental General comprehensive High School (NOGCHS) by virtue of R.A. 5694, series of 1970. It was passed in Congress without proper consultations from the students and alumni. Enraged, the school alumni lead the legal battle to change it.

It took more than ten years of legal battle by the alumni and friends to eventually pass Batas Pambansa No. 2193, series of 1983 which changed NOGCHS back to its old name, the Negros Occidental High School.

== School Administration (1902-1935) ==
NOHS was managed by American school principals from its beginning in 1902 up to the year 1935 when the Commonwealth of the Philippines took effect. They were:

- 1902 - 1904 ------------------- Mr. Ray Howell
- 1904 - 1908 ------------------- Amos A. David
- 1908 - 1918 ------------------- Mr. Dodrill
- 1918 - 1920 ------------------- Webber B. Spalding
- 1920 - 1921 ------------------- Mr. Hack
- 1921 - 1922 ------------------- Mr. Starboard
- 1925 - 1927 ------------------- Mr. Alme
- 1927 - 1928 ------------------- Arthur Stickle
- 1928 - 1935 ------------------- D' Artagnan Williams

== School Administration (1935-present) ==
Later, Filipino educators took over the school administration as high school principals:

- 1935 - 1941 ------------------- Candido Sugatan
- 1941 - 1946 ------------------- Tomas Maglaya
- 1946 - 1950 ------------------- Dominador K. Lopez
- 1950 - 1951 ------------------- Piedad Villanueva
- 1951 - 1956 ------------------- Juan D. Saturnino
- 1956 - 1959 ------------------- Francisco O. Vinco
- 1959 - 1965 ------------------- Salvador Tacardon
- 1965 - 1969 ------------------- Fortunato Cachopero
- 1969 - 1970 ------------------- Lilia Alejandrino
- 1970 - 1971 ------------------- Aproniano Andas
- 1971 - 1988 ------------------- Epifanio Pajares
- 1988 - 1993 ------------------- Lilia R. Cuesta
- 1993 - 2008 ------------------- Nilda M. Monge
- 2008 - 2009 ------------------- Luisito Escalona (OIC)
- 2009 - 2021 ------------------- Mario S. Amaca
- 2021 - 2025 ---------------- Josette S. Terrora, Ph.D
- April 2025-June 2026 ------- Donnabella O. Aposaga (OIC)
- June 2026 - August 2026 ---- Loini T. Torrecarrion (OIC)
- 2025–present --------------- Cheryl J. Tondo, Ph.D
