= Golden Pen Awards =

- Awarded for: Excellence in student writing
- Country: Philippines
- Presented by: Department of Education
- Website: http://www.deped.gov.ph/

The Golden Pen Awards is the highest competition for budding writers (journalism) in both private and public schools in the Western Visayas, Philippines pursuant to the Sec. 1 Rule IX of Republic Act 7079 also known as Campus Journalism Act of 1991. The writing contest includes both students from the elementary and secondary level.

This journalism contest is separately organized compared to Regional Schools Press Conference (RSPC) wherein the winners will advance to the National Schools Press Conference (NSPC). This structure would still depend on the organizing committees and to Department of Education (Philippines) to ensure a higher standard for the campus journalists. The contest is scheduled annually with four level/category to select its winners started from grades 3–4, grades 5–6 for the elementary level and 1st year to 2nd year and 3rd to 4th year for the high school level.

== Training, development and contest ==
Students who will compete in the Golden Pen Awards attend seminars before the actual competition. The contest are all in English medium and all category are judged independently and all points will be added to every writer's entry which will determain his standing and the overall points will be total to the school standing as a group contest. There will group winners awarded as top 10 best performing schools, individual ranking from 10th place up to the 1st place standing in six categories, likewise the most promising writer, outstanding writer and the highest individual awards as golden pen awards recipient.

Young campus journalists during the awarding ceremony of 2007 Golden Pen Awards

== Contest and categories ==
- News Writing
- Editorial Cartooning
- Editorial Writing
- Feature Writing
- Sports Writing
- Copyreading / Headline Writing
- Editorial Cartooning

== See also ==
- National Schools Press Conference
- Up The Hill
