= JJ (nickname) =

As a nickname, JJ, J.J., or J. J. may refer to:

== In arts and entertainment ==
- Justo Justo or JJ (1941–2012), Filipino columnist and news presenter
- J.J. Caucus, a character in the Doonesbury comic strip
- J. J. Abrams (born 1966), American media director and producer
- JJ Burnel (born 1952), Franco-English musician, singer-songwriter and producer
- JJ Cale (1938–2013), American singer-songwriter, recording artist and influential guitar stylist
- JJ Lin (born 1981), Singaporean mandopop singer-songwriter, composer and actor
- J. J. McCullough, Canadian YouTuber
- JJ Olatunji (born 1993), English YouTube personality, professional boxer and singer also known as KSI
- Jay-J (born 1969), American house music disc jockey
- Jökull Júlíusson or JJ, Icelandic singer and songwriter with the band Kaleo
- Jennifer Herrema or JJ, American singer and songwriter with the band Royal Trux
- Johannes Pietsch or JJ (born 2001), Austrian singer-songwriter
- Junaid Jamshed or JJ (1964–2016), Pakistani recording artist and religious figure
- Justin Quinn or JJ, British singer known for his vocals on songs by UK garage duo DJ Luck & MC Neat
- Josie Totah or J. J. (born 2001), American actress
- J.J. Villard, American animator and filmmaker, known for creating King Star King and JJ Villard's Fairy Tales
- J.J., band featuring English singer Jan Johnston

== In sports ==
- J. J. Davis (born 1978), American baseball player
- JJ Dunnigan (born 2008), American football player
- J. J. Koski (born 1996), American football player
- JJ Lehto (born 1966), Finnish motorsport racing driver
- J. J. Mann (born 1991), American basketball player
- J. J. McCarthy (born 2003), American football player
- JJ McKiernan (born 2002), English footballer
- J. J. Moses (born 1979), American football player
- JJ Pegues (born 2001), American football player
- JJ Peterka (born 2002), German ice hockey player
- JJ Quinerly (born 2002), American basketball player
- J. J. Raterink (born 1981), American football player
- JJ Redick (born 1984), American basketball player
- J. J. Russell (born 1998), American football player
- J. J. Syvrud (born 1977), American football player
- J. J. Taylor (born 1998), American football player
- J. J. Watt (born 1989), American football defensive end for the Houston Texans of the National Football League (NFL)
- JJ Wetherholt (born 2002), American baseball player
- J. J. Williams (1948–2020), retired Welsh rugby union player
- J. J. Yeley (born 1976), American NASCAR driver
- Jermaine Jenas (born 1983) retired English professional footballer
- Jimmie Johnson (born 1975), American Indycar driver

== In other fields ==
- Robert Jay (judge) (born 1959), noted in court reports as "Jay J."
- Jonathan "JJ" Johnson, American businessman and politician from Utah
- J. J. Thomson (1856–1940), English physicist
- J. J. Valberg (1936), British-American philosopher
- J.J. Webster (1898–1965), American politician
- Jan Jambon (1960), Belgian politician
- Janez Janša, former Slovenian prime minister

== See also ==
- JJ (disambiguation)
