= Up the Hill =

Up the Hill may refer to:

- Up the Hill (newspaper), a student-run newspaper at Jack and Jill School, Bacolod, Philippines
- "Up the Hill" (Teletubbies), a 2000 television episode
- "Up the Hill", a song by Captain Tractor

== See also ==
- "Up the Hill Backwards", a song by David Bowie
