= Swamp Angel =

Swamp Angel may refer to:

- Swamp Angel, Kansas
- Swamp Angels, a New York City, waterfront, street gang, during the mid-nineteenth century
- a Parrott rifle used in the bombardment of Charleston, South Carolina
- Swamp Angel (children's book), by Anne Isaacs (1994)
