= JAJ =

JAJ may refer to:

- Jaj, a village in Lebanon
- Jhajha railway station, in Bihar, India
- Zazao language
- James Austin Johnson, American comedian and actor

== See also ==
- J & J (disambiguation)
