= JJ =

JJ or jj may refer to:

== Arts and entertainment ==
=== Film and television ===
- J. J. Evans, a character in the 1970s sitcom Good Times
- Jennifer Jareau or JJ, a character in Criminal Minds
- John Diggle Jr., a character in Arrow nicknamed "J.J."
- JJ DiMeo, a character in Speechless
- Jean-Jacques Leroy, a character in Yuri on Ice
- JJ Jones (Skins), a character in the British teen drama Skins
- "JJ" (Skins series 3), an episode of Skins series 3
- "JJ", an episode of Skins series 4
- The Macra Terror, a 1967 Doctor Who serial (production code JJ)
- JJ Maybank, a character in the Netflix teen drama Outer Banks (TV series)

=== Music ===
- JJ (Swedish band)
- JJ, a band featuring English singer Jan Johnston
- J.J.!, an album by J. J. Johnson
- "J.J.", a song on the soundtrack of the video game L.A. Noire
- Abbreviation for Latin Jesu Juva, used by Johann Sebastian Bach at the beginning of his compositions

=== Other media ===
- JJ (magazine), a fashion magazine
- JJ (video game), a video game developed and published by Square Co., Ltd.

== People ==
- JJ (singer) (born 2001), Austrian singer and winner of the Eurovision Song Contest 2025
- JJ Cale (1938-2013), American guitarist, singer and songwriter
- JJ Dunnigan (born 2008), American football player
- J. J. Eubanks (born 1968), American basketball player
- JJ Galbreath (born 2001), American football player
- JJ Kaplan (born 1997), American-Israeli basketball player
- JJ Lehto (born Jyrki Juhani Järvilehto, 1966), Finnish motor racing driver
- JJ Lin (born 1981), Singaporean artist
- J. J. McCarthy (born 2003), American football player
- J. J. Moser (born 2000), Swiss professional hockey player
- JJ Pegues (born 2001), American football player
- JJ Redick (born 1984), American basketball coach and player
- J. J. Roberts (American football) (born 2001), American football player
- J. J. Valberg (born 1936), British-American philosopher
- J. J. Webster (1898–1965), American politician

== Other uses ==
- JJ, abbreviation for plural judges or justices
- JJ, a brassiere measurement in the UK
- Jj coupling, a form of angular momentum coupling
- JJ, IATA code for LATAM Brasil
- J/Z (New York City Subway service), formerly JJ
- , rapid trains on the Jōban Line in Japan
- Jilly Juice, a fermented drink and a form of alternative medicine
- John Jay Hall, a dormitory at Columbia University

== See also ==
- Jay Jay the Jet Plane, a children's television cartoon series
- Jay Jay, a 2003 Tamil film
- Jay-J (born 1969), American house music disc jockey
- Double J (disambiguation)
- J & J (disambiguation)
- JJS (disambiguation)
- GG (disambiguation)
- JJJ (disambiguation)
