= Castleson High =

Private high school in Bacolod, Philippines

Location
- City Heights Subd. Bacolod, Philippines; 10°40′25″N 122°57′58″E

Information
- Former names: JJS Castleson
- Type: Private
- Motto: Thinkers and Leaders of Tomorrow
- Established: 1995
- Grades: 7 to 12
- Enrollment: 100
- Campus: Urban, 2 hectares combine all branches: City Heights & Victorias Campuses
- Colors: Green and White
- Athletics: NOPSSCEA Sports
- Affiliation: NOPSSCEA, Department of Education (Philippines)
- Website: www.jjscastleson.org

Castleson High is a high school institution established in 1995. Informally referred to by its acronym "CH", it is a private, non-sectarian, educational institution located in City Heights, 5 kilometers south of Bacolod, the capital of Negros Occidental province and Victorias City, 34 kilometers north of Bacolod in the Philippines. High school enrollment at both of these locations is close to 100 students. Its major feeder elementary schools come from Jack and Jill School branches and other local schools. At the City Heights location, the Sidera Special Child Center mainstreams its high school students at Castleson High.

It is one of the few institutions in the country where karate is part of the school curriculum; karate is included in physical education class all year round.

== History ==
Cecilia del Castillo-Lopez chose the name "Castleson" in honor of her father and the del Castillo name (i.e., del Castillo and sons).

Castleson High was founded by Cecilia del Castillo-Lopez as a high school in 1995 wherein 16 students (fifteen boys and one girl) in Homesite under Rhazel Estelloso and 11 students (six boys and five girls) in City Heights Subd. under Ronald Loreto as pioneer classes. In the next year, Castleson High Schools in Homesite and City Heights were merged to become one school located in City Heights' new high school facility. By 2001, Castleson High in Victorias was established. A recent addition in City Heights was the Speech and Language Clinic which opened in 2008. Throughout Jack and Jill School's history, other branches in Airport, La Granja, Paglaum, and La Carlota were also opened and later closed.

In 1980, JJS and Castleson Schools Inc. was established to incorporate and organize several schools under one administration. Today, Jack and Jill School, Sidera Special Child Center, and Castleson High, which are operated in Bacolod City and Victorias City, fall under the purview of one administration.

== Administration ==
Cecilia del Castillo-Lopez continues to oversee the schools' financial affairs. Her daughter serves as President while her grandson serves as Vice-President of Finance and Administration. The Director of Academic Affairs oversees all schools and provides support in terms of curriculum and resources. School year 2010-11 marks the transitional year when Mrs. Lopez relinquished the decision-making tasks to the president and the current director.

== Student life ==
=== Castleson Gazette ===
The official school publication is called Castleson Gazette established in 1995. Like its elementary school affiliate Up The Hill, it is published twice a year. Issues one to five were in tabloid format while in 2000, the format changed to Newsletter following the standard set by Department of Education (Philippines). The editors are member of Department of Education DepED Editors Guild of the Philippines.

- Department of Education DepED Editors Guild of the Philippines
- Regional English Circle - Western Visayas

Department of Education (Philippines) DepED achievers in Division, Regional, National Schools Press Conferences, Golden Pen Awards & Panay News Writing Competition.

Victory at NSPC by Sofia Isabelle Ortiz Grade 6-Batch 2008

Team JJS/Castleson Karate Dojo
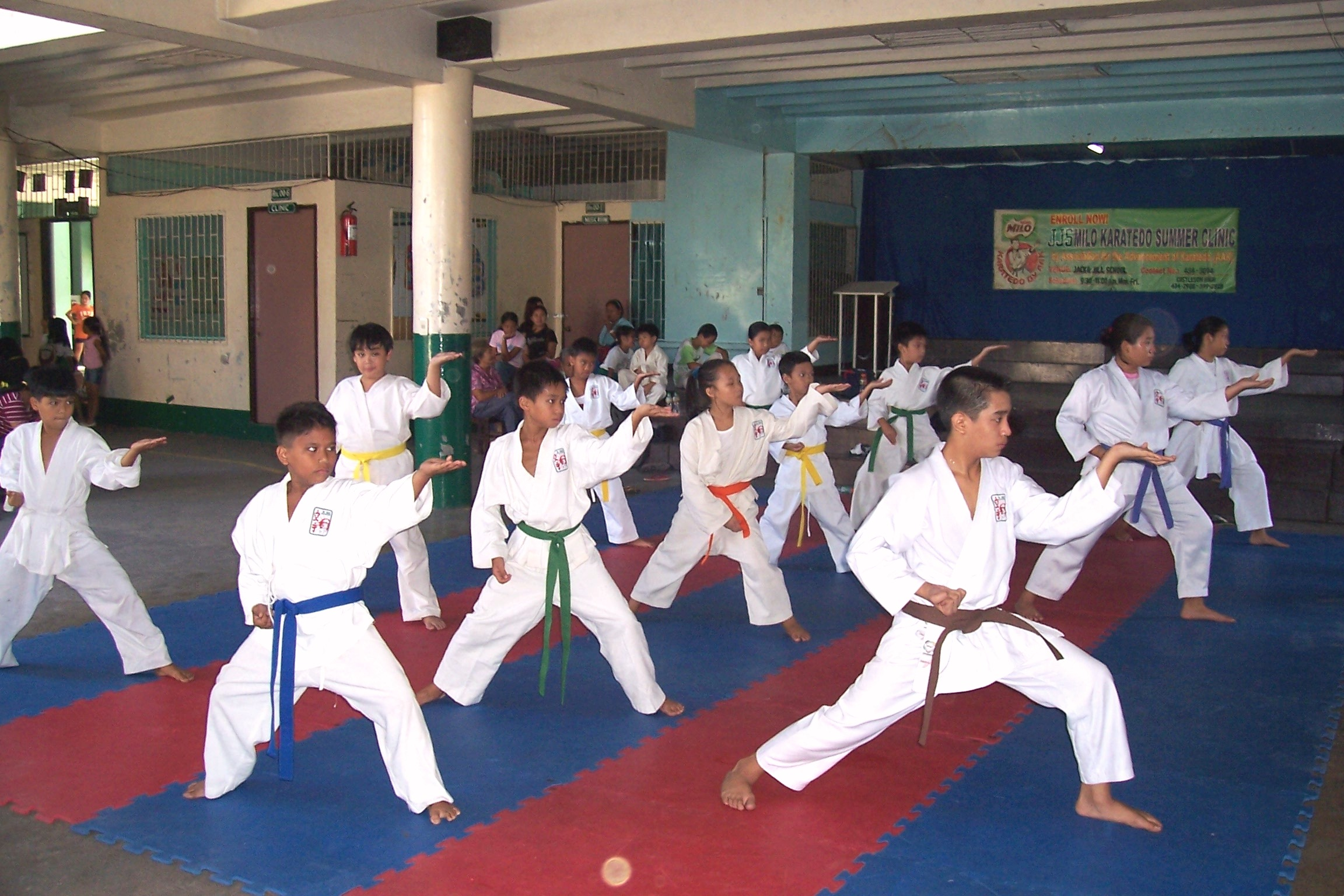
- Karate Dojo, Bacolod City, Philippines
- Also known as: Super Karate Kids of Bacolod City (空手道)
- Date founded: S.Y. 1995
- Country of origin: from Japan to Philippines
- Founder: Randy Mengullo, sensei
- Arts taught: Karatedo - WKF rules
- Ancestor schools: Red Bull Karate Club 43

=== Karate ===
Team JJS/Castleson is the home of Super Karate Kids in the country was initiated by sensei Randy Mengullo and sensei Elan Delfin, Sandan and Nidan Blackbelts in karate-do who garnered medals in many karatedo championships and athletic meet of different schools and karate organizations in the Philippines. Karate is part of its curriculum wherein students from Grades 1-6 (Elementary) up to high school (grades 7-10) are required to join training at the JJS Karate Dojo as part of their Physical Education (P.E.) activity for the whole year. JJS/Castleson adapt Shotokan and Wado-ryu styles, member of Philippine Karatedo Federation the governing body of sport karate in the country. Official training center of Milo Sports Clinic.

Castleson High is a member of Negros Occidental Private Schools Sports Cultural Educational Association (NOPSSCEA), where it fields team in many events. It was also a founding member of Negros Occidental Karatedo Federation (NOKAF) in the 1990s. Aside from NOPSSCEA, the JJS/Castleson Karatedo Team participates in the Philippine Karatedo Federation National Championship, Mayor Evelio Leonardia Cup, the Ang Batang Pinoy, Philippine National Youth Games, Philippine Olympic Festival, UMA-ONEBA Presidential Cup, Philippine Sports Commission Tournaments and athletic meet of different schools in the Philippines.

==== Notable practitioners ====
  - Regional and national winners

Karatedo achievers
Richmond Regalado; Carlos Hilado; Joebert Jabelosa; Ryan Gino-o; Joemar Villagracia	Nick Michael Sy; Celestino Araneta; Janlee Casquejo; Kimberly Fanega; Cymil Jay Esacaran	John Lander Corpuz; Ian Kee; Benedict John Briones; Dardy de Jose

== See also ==
- Up The Hill - The official Publication of Jack and Jill School

== Gallery ==
Philippine Karatedo Federation National Winners

Young campus journalists

National Winners

The sensei & founder

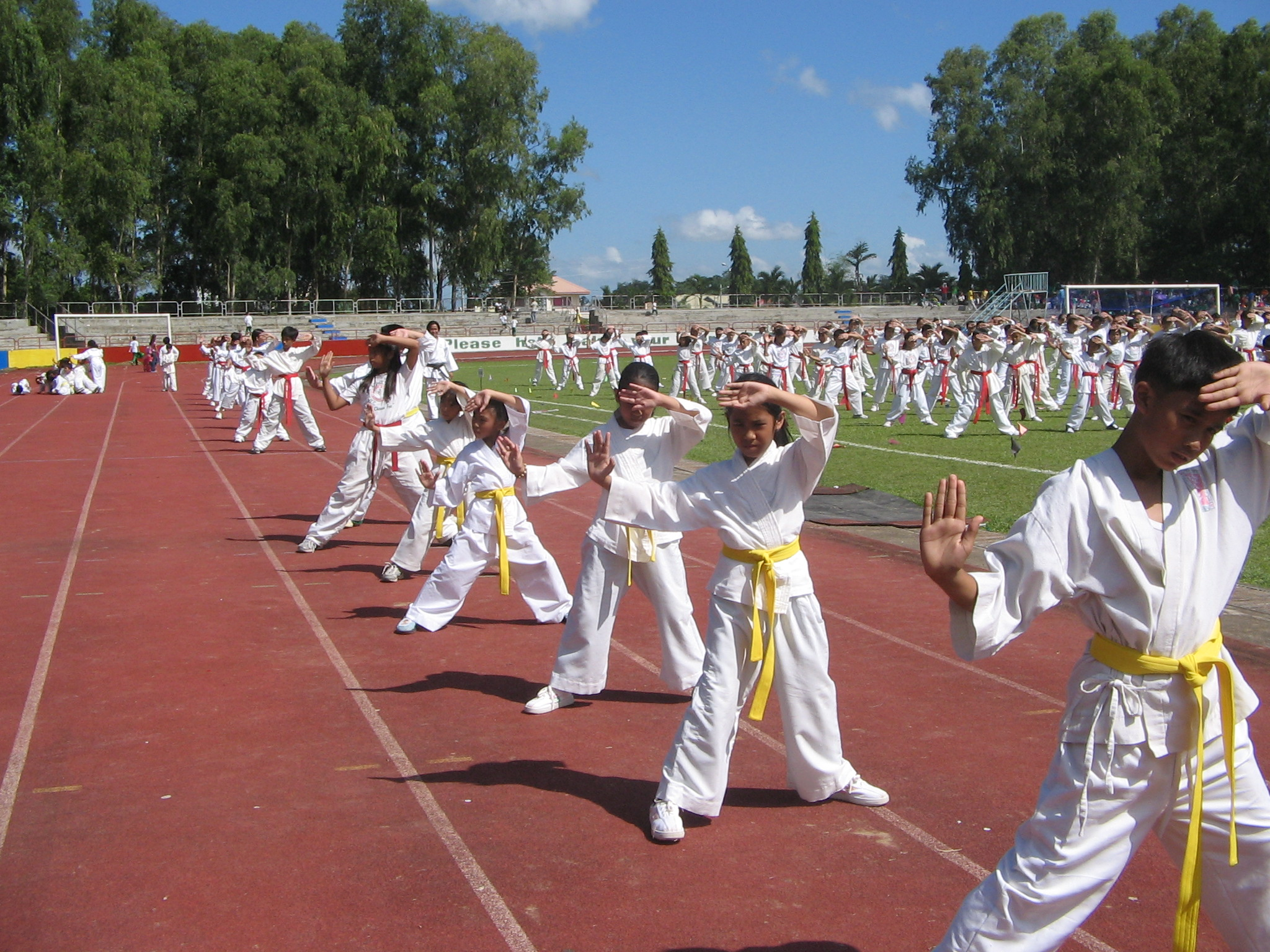
Playground demo at Panaad Stadium

National Gold Medalist

== See also ==
- Jack and Jill School
