= JJS =

JJS may refer to:

- Jakarta Japanese School
- Jack and Jill School, in Bacolod City, Philippines
- JJS Karate Dojo, martial arts organization
- Journal of Japanese Studies
- Journal of Jewish Studies
- Utah Division of Juvenile Justice Services
- WJJS, a radio station
