= Manhattan High School =

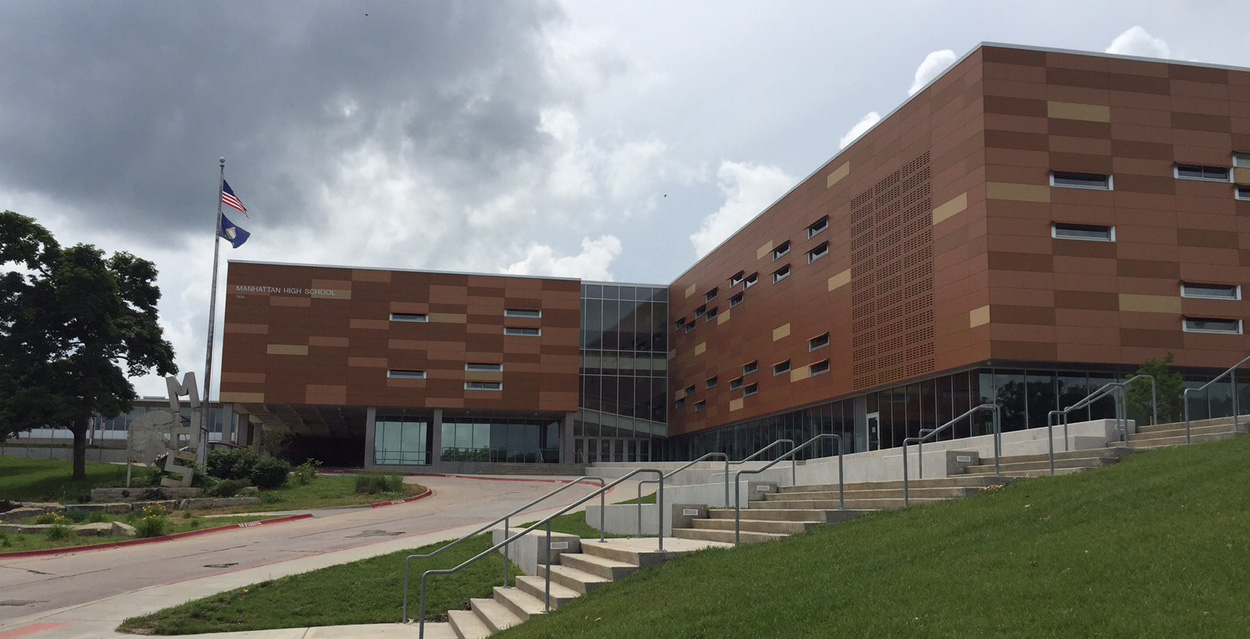
- Manhattan High, West Campus in 2015

Location
- 2100 Poyntz Avenue (West Campus); 901 Poyntz Avenue (East Campus); Manhattan, Kansas 66502; United States: West campus: 39°10′46″N 96°35′31.5″W; East campus: 39°10′42″N 96°34′15″W

Information
- Type: Public high school
- Established: 1873; 153 years ago
- School district: Manhattan–Ogden USD 383
- NCES District ID: 2009180
- NCES School ID: 200918000853
- Principal: Michael Dorst
- Teaching staff: 132.65 (on an FTE basis)
- Grades: 9–12
- Enrollment: 2,060 (2024–25)
- Student to teacher ratio: 15.05
- Colors: Blue; White; Red (accent)
- Athletics conference: Centennial League
- Nickname: Indians
- Rival: Junction City High School
- Newspaper: The Mentor
- Website: mhs.usd383.org

Manhattan High School is a public high school in Manhattan, Kansas, United States, serving students in grades 9–12. It is part of the Manhattan–Ogden USD 383 school district. For the 2024–2025 school year, Manhattan High had an enrollment of 2,060 students. The school's athletic teams are referred to as the "Indians," and have won 50 state championships.

== History ==
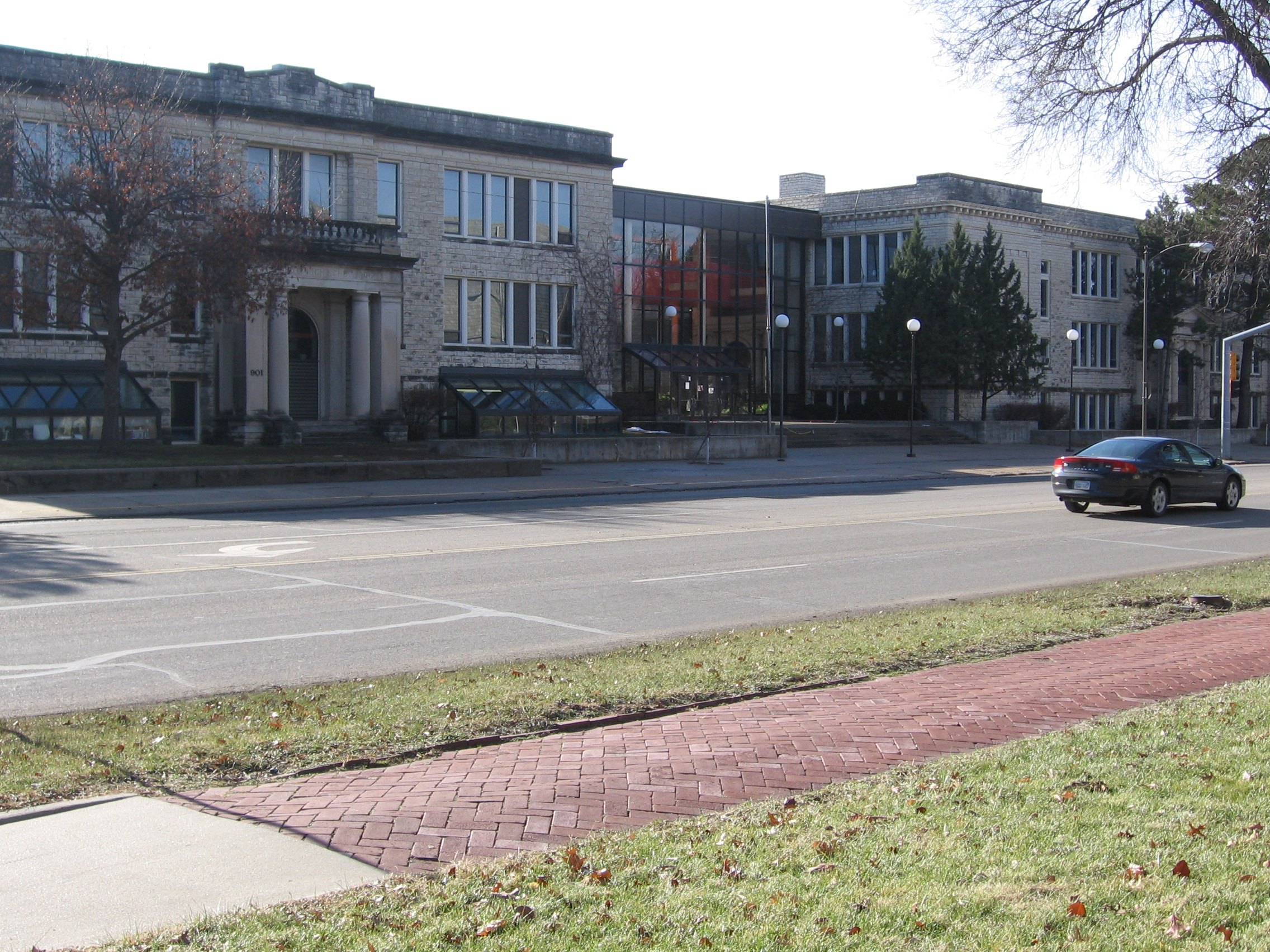
Manhattan High, East Campus

The first public schoolhouse in Manhattan was built in 1857, serving all grades. The first dedicated secondary school in the town opened in 1873 at the current site of the Manhattan High School "East Campus." The first recorded high school graduation ceremony was held in 1892.

The current East Campus of the school consists of two limestone buildings that are connected by a glass walkway. The first building – on the far right side in the accompanying photo – was opened in 1914 to replace the earlier secondary school. (Many histories date the establishment of Manhattan High from the completion of this building in 1914.) The second building – on the left side of the accompanying photo – was built in 1918 as a separate building for junior high school students (grades 7, 8, and 9).

The West Campus is a red brick building that was constructed in 1956 to be the new high school. Both of the older buildings (the current East Campus) were then utilized for junior high school students. Over the next 40 years, the new high school faced recurring overcrowding issues and was significantly expanded, but the new school simply proved unable to keep up with the town's population growth. After considering and rejecting the idea of building a second high school in Manhattan, in 1996 the town instead built two new middle schools, and moved the ninth grade to the East Campus.

Beginning in 2011, the West Campus underwent a $42.2 million renovation and expansion. The construction added 14 new classrooms, in addition to a number of other improvements, and supplied a new facade for much of the building.

== Campus layout ==
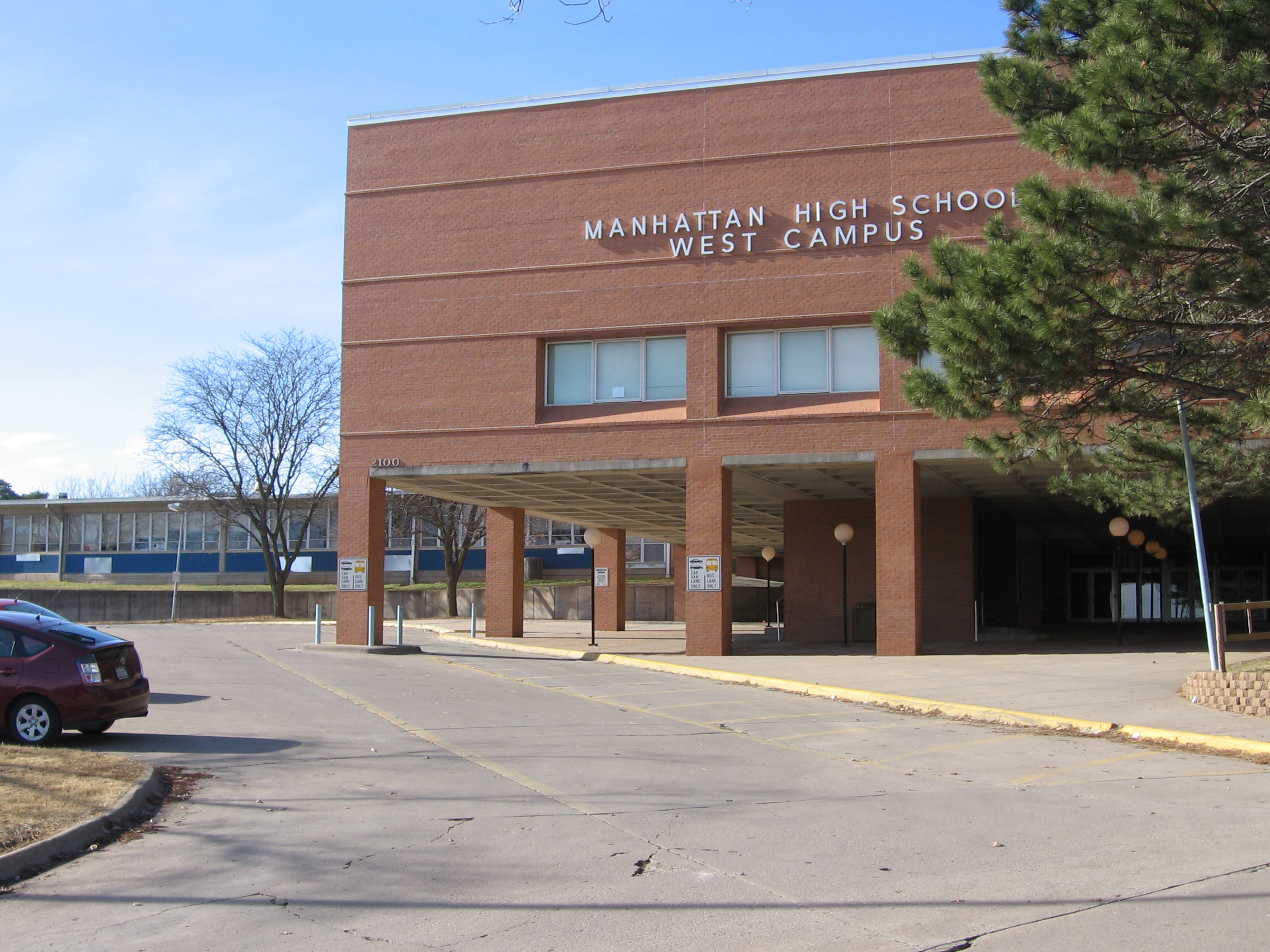
MHS West Campus (2006)

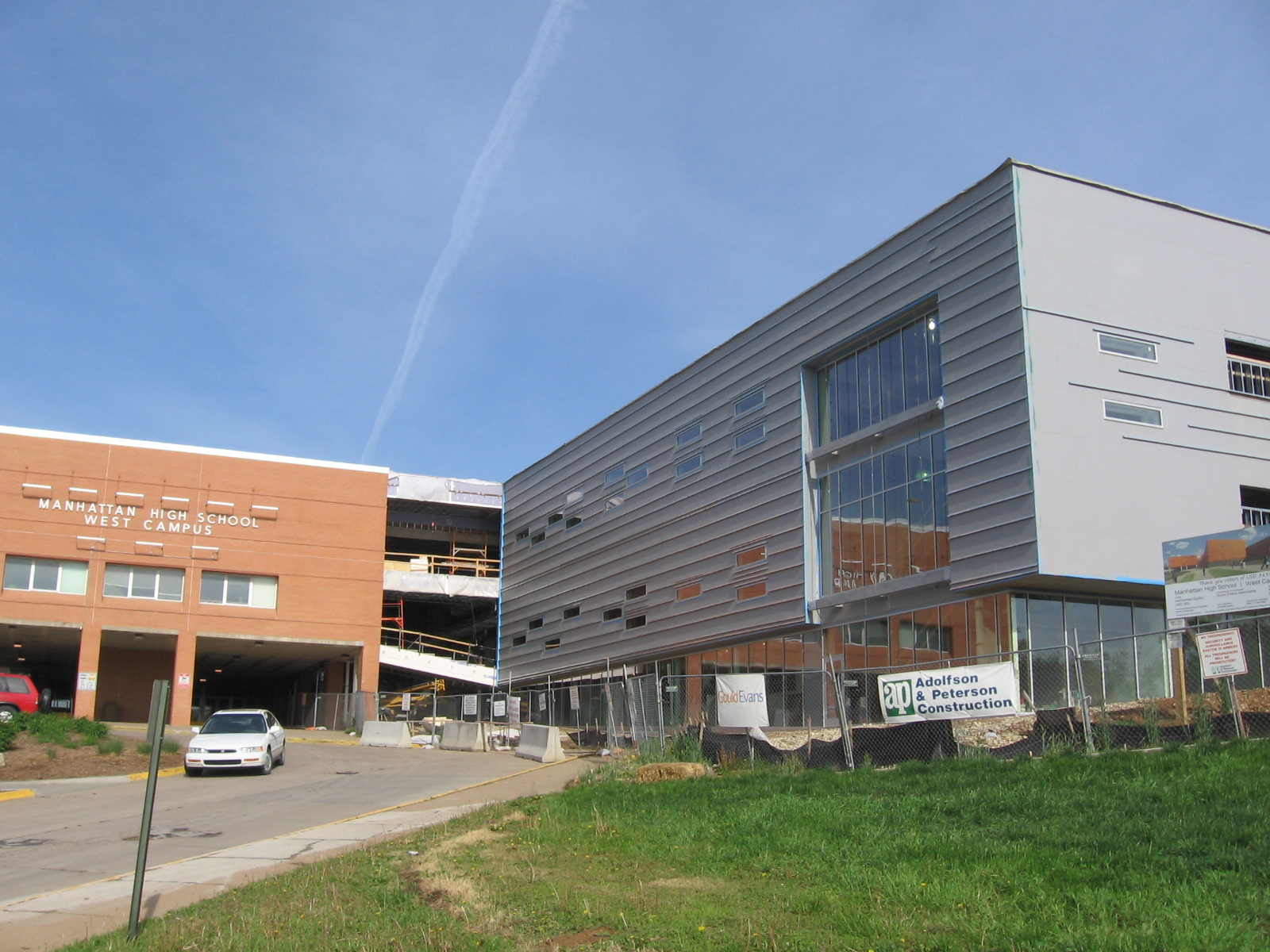
MHS West Campus, in the midst of a $42-million renovation (May 2011)

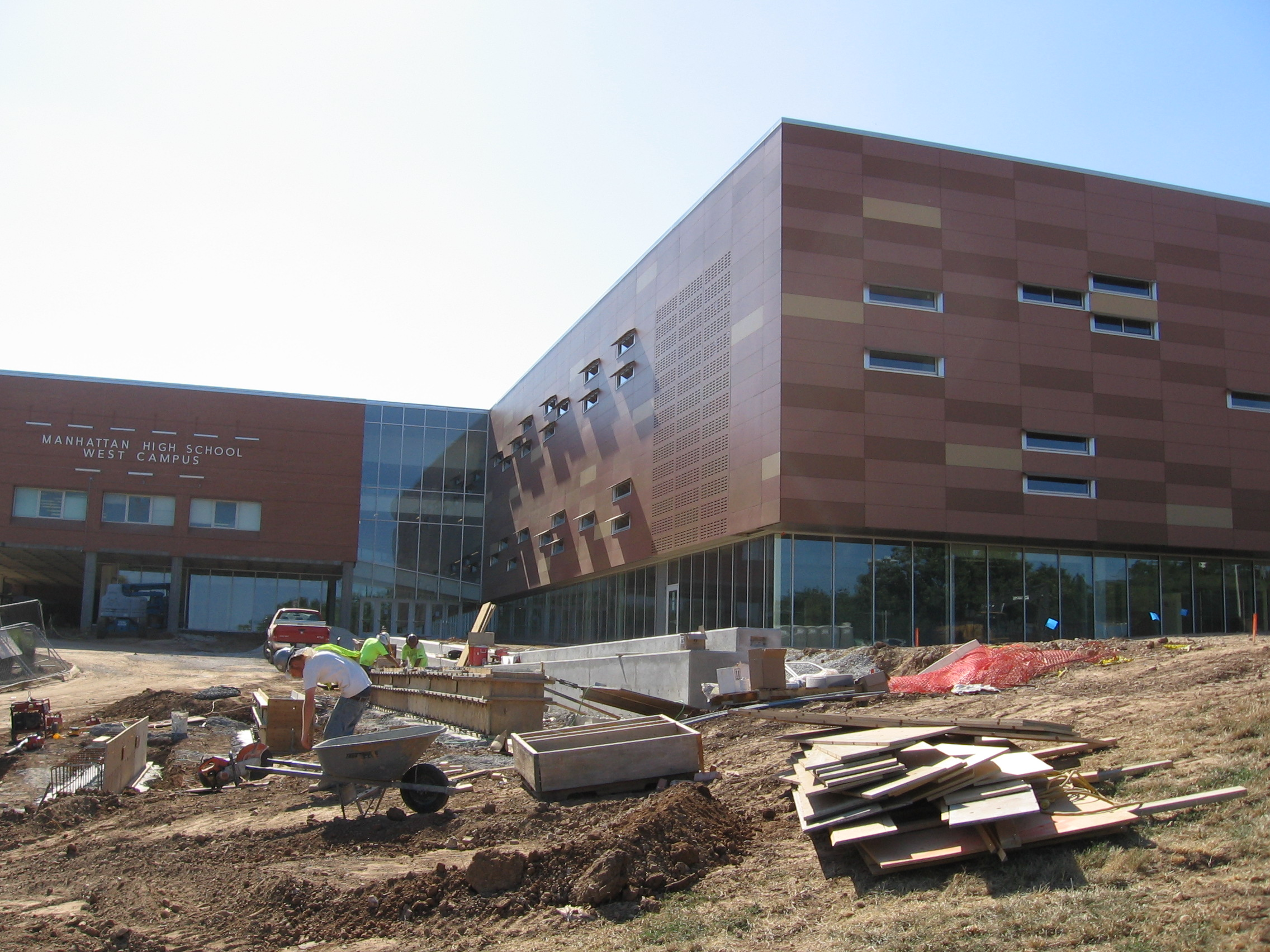
MHS West Campus (July 2011)

The West Campus is laid out in five parallel hallways, with an open space between each and a central "commons area." Each hallway is lettered from south to north. Classes in the industrial arts are held in a detached building behind the West Campus. A large greenhouse and a new fitness center are also detached from the main building. The West Campus houses two gymnasiums; one is used as a general purpose facility and the other is primarily for basketball and volleyball games.

The East Campus is composed of two three-story limestone buildings, connected with a glass walkway and an annex in the rear (not visible in the above photo), built in 1928. The campus also has a detached gymnasium built behind the main stone buildings.

In 2023, 9th graders moved up to the West Campus. The East Campus was then converted into the Lincoln Education Center. USD 383 uses the building for administration purposes, while the gym is still used for wrestling and indoor baseball practices.

== Academics ==
There are a wide range of learning opportunities offered at MHS, from tutoring for learning-impaired students to dual credit classes at Kansas State University, and a wide range of elective classes. Currently the school offers electives from performing arts to language arts to physical arts. Manhattan High is also the hub of a statewide virtual education academy called the iQ Academy Kansas. The online classes give students the opportunity to study and learn at their own personal pace. 240 students were enrolled in the program as of 2007.

In the 2015–2016 school year there were four National Merit Finalists from Manhattan High.

== Extracurricular activities ==
=== Athletics ===
Manhattan High has teams competing in baseball, basketball (boys and girls), bowling (boys and girls), cross country (boys and girls), football, golf (boys and girls), soccer (boys and girls), softball, swimming & diving (boys and girls), tennis (boys and girls), track & field (boys and girls), volleyball (girls), and wrestling. The school competes at the 6A level (largest schools) in the Centennial League. Manhattan High has its own stadium, Bishop Stadium, which seats 4,000 spectators and hosts football games and track events. The football field was changed from grass to artificial turf in 2013.

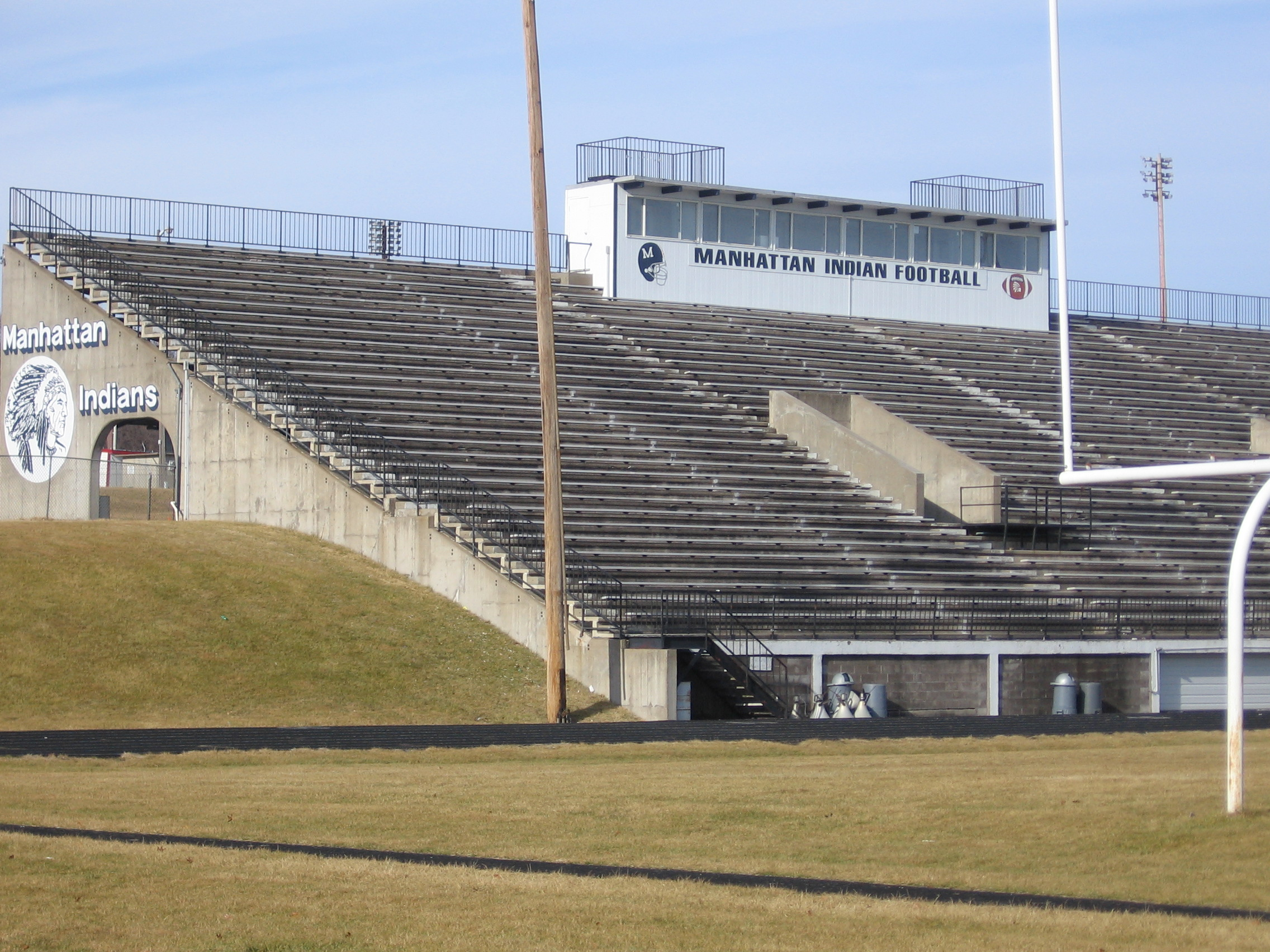
Manhattan High's Bishop Stadium

The school is a member of the Centennial League, which it joined in 2004. MHS was previously a member of the defunct I-70 League from 1978 to 2004, and before that the Central Kansas League (CKL).

The athletics program has received some national recognition. On June 19, 2007, Sports Illustrated published a list of the top high school athletic programs in each state, and Manhattan High School was declared the top high school athletics program in Kansas for 2007. Also, Manhattan High's football team was nationally ranked in the USA Today poll during the 1987 and 1988 seasons.

==== Mascot controversy ====
Manhattan High's sports teams are called the "Indians." In light of debate over the use of Native American mascots in athletics, the use of the name "Indians" by the high school has been questioned since it was adopted. The mascot name was intended, in part, to honor Frank Prentup, a former football coach of the high school who claimed Indian ancestry. In 2001, the Unified School District 383 Board of Education voted to retain the mascot name but would restrict how the Indian could be portrayed.

In 2015, there was a renewed push to remove the "Indians" name. The following year the Manhattan-Ogden school board voted 7–0 to keep the "Indians" nickname. In addition to honoring the former coach, the other reasons cited by the board for keeping the mascot involved an estimated cost of $300,000 to replace the mascot amidst state level budget cuts. However, the board voted to form a committee that would explore creating a new mascot, determining the associated costs, and finding methods to fund such a change. Additionally, a greater emphasis would now be placed on Native American education at the school and community levels. The committee would report on its findings to the school board by September 2017.

==== State championships ====
State Championships
Season	Sport	Championships	Year(s)
Fall	Cross Country, Boys	3	1983 • 1984 • 2013
Fall	Cross Country, Girls	4	1977 • 1979 • 2015 • 2025
Fall	Football	6	1943^ • 1961^{+} • 1974 • 1988 • 2022 • 2025
Fall	Golf, Girls	13	1985 • 1986 • 1989 • 1990 • 1991 • 1993 • 2000 • 2003 • 2004 • 2006 • 2008 • 2024 • 2025
Fall	Volleyball	4	1986 • 1987 • 2003 • 2010
Winter	Basketball, Girls	1	2017
Winter	Swimming and Diving, Boys	2	1993 • 1995
Winter	Indoor Track & Field, Boys	1	1977
Winter	Wrestling	6	2004 • 2007 • 2012 • 2017 • 2024 • 2025
Spring	Baseball	2	1992 • 1998
Spring	Golf, Boys	8	1948 (2-Man) • 1966 (2-Man) • 1971 • 1978 (2-Man); 1991 • 1994 • 2004 • 2006
Spring	Track and Field, Boys	3	2009 • 2018 • 2021
Spring	Track and Field, Girls	2	1989 • 2002
Total		55	

^ unofficial; predates KSHSAA playoffs and AP poll
^{+}predates KSHSAA playoffs; ranked #1 in final AP poll

=== Non-athletic programs ===
==== Debate/Forensics ====
The Manhattan High Debate and Forensics team is ranked among the top schools in the nation by number of degrees by the National Forensics League. Manhattan High has competed at the state in all the NFL events and at the national level in many of the events.

- The debate team won KSHSAA state championships in 1972, 1973, 1984, 1987, 1988, 2004 (2-speaker), 2015 (4-Speaker).
- The forensics team won KSHSAA state championships in 1984, 2008, 2012, 2014, and 2015.

==== Journalism ====
Manhattan High School's newspaper, The Mentor, was founded in 1919. It used to be one of the few weekly high school newspapers in Kansas, though it hasn't been weekly for several years. The paper is printed on the presses of The Manhattan Mercury.

The school's journalism students have won a number of statewide awards in competitions administered by the Kansas Scholastic Press Association.

The first newspaper issued by the school was the Manhattan High School Monitor, in 1873–1874.

==== Music ====
Manhattan High School's marching band. The concert band performs during the spring season. There is also a large choir program, which includes mixed choirs, men's and women's choirs, and two show choirs. In addition, there is a jazz ensemble, symphonic band, wind ensemble, and both chamber and symphonic orchestras. Many of these ensembles and their members regularly participate in regional and state solo and ensemble competitions. Ensembles also participate in national competitions such as the Festival of Gold, which the symphonic and chamber orchestras participated in in 2015. An ensemble of volunteer players is used as the pit orchestra for the school musical.

==== Performing arts ====
Manhattan High has a drama and stagecraft program. A four performance musical is put on annually in mid-November, showcasing the talent of MHS thespians. Performances take place in the Rezac Auditorium at the West Campus. It has an active performance calendar that includes a fall Broadway musical with full pit orchestra, a Winter Gala featuring large performing groups, a winter play, a spring play, student directed one-act plays, showcase concerts for show choirs and jazz band, as well as the traditional large-group concerts each quarter. Every other year, MHS choirs partake in a music festival at Disney World over spring break.

== Notable alumni ==
- 19th century: Samuel Williston, paleontologist (pre-1873)
- 19th century: Philip Fox, astronomer
- 1916: Clementine Paddleford, food critic and Al Jolley, NFL player
- 1923: Frank Morrison, 34th Governor of Nebraska
- 1924: Bert Pearson, NFL player
- 1926: Solon Kimball, anthropologist
- 1927: Fred Seaton, U.S. Senator, Secretary of the Interior
- 1930: Kenneth Davis, historian, winner of Francis Parkman Prize
- 1930: Joan Finney, 42nd Governor of Kansas
- 1939: Virginia Yapp Trotter, U.S. Assistant Secretary of Education
- 1949: Earl Woods, father of Tiger Woods
- 1952: Del Close, actor, comedian, one of the premier influences on modern improvisational theater
- 1952: Inger Stevens, actress
- 1954: Tom Oberheim, inventor of Oberheim synthesizer and DMX drum machine, which defined early hip-hop production
- 1961: Robert Woodruff, NASA physicist
- 1961: Samina Quraeshi, Pakistani-American artist, author and educator; National Endowment for the Arts Design Director (1994–1997)
- 1964: Bill Buzenberg, journalist, executive director of Center for Public Integrity, vice-president of news at NPR
- 1972: Dawayne Bailey, musician
- 1974: Gary Spani, member of College Football Hall of Fame and Kansas City Chiefs Hall of Fame
- 1977: Tim Jankovich, college basketball coach
- 1981: Deb Richard, former professional golfer
- 1982: Michael Kremer (graduated early in 1981), Nobel laureate, MacArthur Fellows Program "genius grant" recipient
- 1982: Anna Seaton, won bronze medal at 1992 Summer Olympics, member of America's Cup crew on the America^{3}
- 1983: Craig Colbert, professional baseball player
- 1988: Brett Wallerstedt, NFL player
- 1989: Thomas Randolph, All-American former football player at Kansas State
- 1989: Jim Smallwood, Colorado State Senator
- 1990: Bridget Everett, cabaret artist, comedian, actress
- 1990: Laird Veatch, collegiate athletic director
- 1992: Will Tiao, actor, realtor, and former federal government official
- 1993: Steve Balderson, filmmaker
- 2003: Tracy Britt Cool, financial advisor
- 2008: Jackie Carmichael, basketball player
- 2009: Charles Melton, actor
- 2012: Deante Burton, NFL player
- 2017: Trevor Hudgins, NBA player
- 2026: JJ Dunnigan, college football safety for the Miami Hurricanes

== See also ==
- List of high schools in Kansas
- List of unified school districts in Kansas
