= J & J =

J & J or J and J may refer to:

- Johnson & Johnson, an American multinational manufacturer of medical devices, pharmaceutical and consumer packaged goods
- J & J Snack Foods, an American food and beverage manufacturing and marketing conglomerate
- J & J Ultralights, an American ultralight aircraft manufacturer
- J&J Design, a Slovenian naval architecture and engineering company
- Jaffa–Jerusalem railway, a railroad that connected Jaffa and Jerusalem
- Jamie Noble and Joey Mercury, an American wrestling tag team known as J&J Security

== See also ==
- JJ (disambiguation)
- JNJ (disambiguation)
- Jack and Jill (disambiguation)
