= Jack and Jill (disambiguation) =

Jack and Jill is a traditional English nursery rhyme.

Jack and Jill, Jack & Jill, or Jack n Jill may also refer to:

== Arts and entertainment ==
=== Film and television ===
- Jack and Jill (1917 film), an American Western silent film
- Jack and Jill: A Postscript, a 1970 Australian film
- Jack and Jill (1998 film), a Canadian anti-romantic comedy film
- Jack and Jill (2011 film), an American comedy film
- Jack N' Jill, 2022 Indian science-fiction film by Santhosh Sivan
- Jack & Jill (TV series), a 1999–2001 American comedy-drama series

=== Literature ===
- Jack & Jill (comics), a 1954–1985 British children's comics magazine
- Jack and Jill (magazine), an American bimonthly magazine for children
- Jack & Jill (novel), a 1996 Alex Cross novel by James Patterson
- Jack and Jill: A Village Story, an 1880 children's book by Louisa May Alcott

=== Music ===
- "Jack and Jill" (Raydio song), 1978
- "Jack and Jill", a 1969 song by Tommy Roe

== Companies and organizations ==
- Jack and Jill of America, an African American leadership group
- Jack and Jill Foundation, a British support group, founded by Jonathan Irwin, for families of children with disabilities
- Jack and Jill Ice Cream, an American ice cream truck company
- Jack and Jill School, an elementary school in Bacolod, Negros Occidental, Philippines

== Other uses ==
- Jack and Jill (dance), a format of competition in partner dancing
- Jack and Jill (party), a Canadian fundraiser for an engaged couple
- Jack and Jill bathroom, a bathroom between two bedrooms
- Clayton Windmills, nicknamed Jack and Jill, near Clayton, West Sussex, England
- Jack 'n jill, a snack brand owned by Universal Robina Corporation in the Philippines
