= Manhattan–Ogden USD 383 =

Public school district in Manhattan, Kansas

Address
- 2031 Poyntz Ave Manhattan, Kansas, 66502; United States
- Coordinates: 39°10′45″N 96°35′22″W

District information
- Type: Public
- Grades: K to 12
- Schools: 13

Other information
- Website: usd383.org

Manhattan–Ogden USD 383 is a public unified school district headquartered in Manhattan, Kansas, United States. The district includes the communities of Manhattan (majority), Ogden, Swamp Angel, and nearby rural areas. The district, mostly in Riley County, and extends into Pottawatomie and Wabaunsee counties.

== Schools ==
The school district operates the following schools:

High school

- Manhattan High School (East and West)

Middle schools

- Susan B. Anthony Middle School
- Dwight D. Eisenhower Middle School

Elementary Schools

- Amanda Arnold Elementary School
- Frank V. Bergman Elementary School
- Bluemont Elementary School
- Lee Elementary School
- Marlatt Elementary School
- Northview Elementary School
- Ogden Elementary School
- Oliver Brown Elementary School
- Theodore Roosevelt Elementary School
- Woodrow Wilson Elementary School

Preschools

- Eugene Field Early Learning Center (previously Eugene Field Elementary)
- College Hill Early Learning Center

== District Sites ==
- Robinson Education Center
- Keith Noll Maintenance Center
- Transportation and Central Kitchen

== History ==
Marvin Wade, previously of the Marshalltown Community School District in Iowa, became the superintendent of Manhattan-Ogden schools in 2016. The school board extended his contract in 2018, with all members agreeing to do so.

As of October 2021, middle schools and 4 elementary schools have finished priority 1 items from 2018 bond projects including the Completion of Oliver Brown Elementary School.

In 2020, the Board of Education decided to go through 2020 with a hybrid learning plan.

== See also ==
- Kansas State Department of Education
- Kansas State High School Activities Association
- List of high schools in Kansas
- List of unified school districts in Kansas
