= Double J =

Double J or Double Jay may refer to:

- Double Jay, the former name of Australian radio station Triple J
  - Double J (radio station), the Triple J-run rebranding of radio station Dig Music
- Double-J stent, a ureteric stent used in urology
- Double-J (manga), a comedy manga by Eiji Nonaka
- Double Jay (horse), an American Thoroughbred racehorse
- Double J, ring name of professional wrestler Jeff Jarrett

== See also ==
- JJ (disambiguation)
