= JNJ (disambiguation) =

JNJ is the NYSE symbol for American multinational pharmaceutical company Johnson & Johnson.

JNJ or JnJ may also refer to:

- Yem language, a language spoken in Ethiopia (with the ISO 639-3 code jnj)
- Ja'Aluni Airport, an airport in Oman (with the IATA code JNJ)
- Juinagar railway station, part of the Mumbai Suburban Railway network (with the station code JNJ)
- National Board of Justice (Junta Nacional de Justicia), a constitutional institution of Peru
- jacknjellify, a YouTube channel created by Cary and Michael Huang (often referred to as JnJ)

== See also ==
- J & J (disambiguation)
