= Swamp Angel, Kansas =

Unincorporated community in Pottawatomie County, Kansas

- Unincorporated community
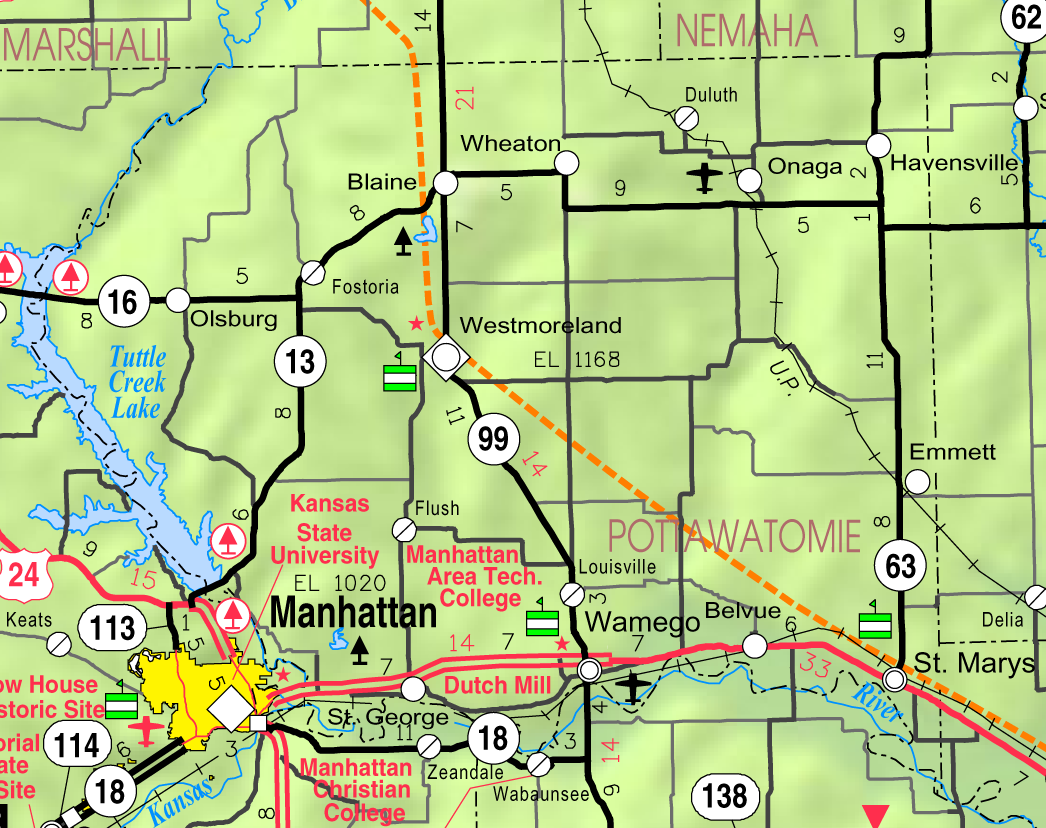
- KDOT map of Pottawatomie County (legend)

- Location within Kansas Location within the United States
- Coordinates: 39°11′40″N 96°28′56″W
- Country: United States
- State: Kansas
- County: Pottawatomie
- Named for: Swamp Angel
- Elevation: 1,001 ft (305 m)
- Time zone: UTC-6 (CST)
  - Summer (DST): UTC-5 (CDT)
- Area code: 785
- FIPS code: 20-69600
- GNIS ID: 484778

Swamp Angel is an unincorporated community in Pottawatomie County, Kansas, United States. It is located approximately halfway between Manhattan and St. George.

== History ==
It was likely named after the Swamp Angel, a large Parrott rifle used in the American Civil War.

== Education ==
The community is served by Manhattan–Ogden USD 383 public school district.
