= News Writing (UIL contest) =

American university writing competition

News Writing is one of several academic events sanctioned by the University Interscholastic League, and one of five in the Journalism category. The academic contests are held annually from December through May.

News Writing is designed to test students' ability to read critically, to digest and prioritize information quickly, and to write clearly, accurately and succinctly. Emphasis is placed on mechanical and stylistic precision, lead writing, use of direct and indirect quotes, and news judgment.

== Eligibility ==
Students in Grade 9 through Grade 12 are eligible to enter this event.

Each school may send up to three students for the district, region, and state competition.

News Writing is an individual contest only; there is no team competition in this event. However, the school with the best performance in the five journalism categories (Editorial Writing, Feature Writing, Headline Writing, Copy Editing, and News Writing) is given a special team award.

== Rules and scoring ==
Students have 45 minutes to complete the contest; a time signal is given when 15 minutes remain.

Students are given a prompt and they are to respond with a news story. Students are given the option of either handwriting the story or using a computer (a portable printer is required).

The judging criteria are as follows:

- (1) Lead consists of the most timely and newsworthy information.
- (2) Facts are presented in descending order of importance.
- (3) Paragraph transition is smooth and logical.
- (4) Direct and indirect quotes are used effectively.
- (5) Writing is active, precise and stylistically exact.
- (6) All news questions are answered.
- (7) Editorialization is avoided.
- (8) Secondary consideration is given to grammar, spelling and neatness.

All papers are read and critiqued, with the top six papers ranked. There are no ties.

== Determining the Winner ==
The top three individuals will advance to the next round.

As the top six papers are ranked 1–6, there are no ties.

For district meet academic championship and district meet sweepstakes awards, points are awarded to the school as follows:

- Individual places: 1st—15, 2nd—12, 3rd—10, 4th—8, 5th—6, and 6th—4.
- In addition, the five top places from each classification (A, AA, AAA, AAAA, and AAAAA) are judged against each other, and the overall winner is given a special "Tops in Texas" award.

== List of prior winners ==
2008

1A	2A	3A	4A	5A
1st Place: Erin Holland	1st Place: Sarah Williams	1st Place: Crystal Castro	1st Place: Bethany Johnsen	1st Place: Michelle Ward
2nd Place: Stormie McClurg	2nd Place: Kaitlyn Hale	2nd Place: Kristi Barrett	2nd Place: Sarah Mills	2nd Place: Rheanna English
3rd Place:Allyson Hochstein	3rd Place:Kembra Gerner	3rd Place:Jessi Taylor	3rd Place:Jennifer Reel	3rd Place:Karen Evans
4th Place: Ryland Darilek	4th Place: Nick Loftis	4th Place: Jessika Street	4th Place: Alyssa Lopez	4th Place: Erin Jentz
5th Place: Kelsea Urich	5th Place: Katdie Norton	5th Place: Dillon Fisher	5th Place: Susan Xie	5th Place: Taylor Jackson
6th Place: Hannah Jones	6th Place: Brad Strickland	6th Place: Lindsay Grossman	6th Place: Luis Cordero	6th Place: Erin May

2007

1A	2A	3A	4A	5A
1st Place: Dustin Schulte	1st Place: Lauren Stewart	1st Place: Matthew Hadley	1st Place: Jennifer Reel	1st Place: Walter Fick
2nd Place: Christina Soto	2nd Place: Paige Cole	2nd Place: Dawn Lipscomb	2nd Place: Kylie Morrison	2nd Place: Katy Turner
3rd Place: Emily Carson	3rd Place: Kembra Gerner	3rd Place: Britany McCraw	3rd Place: Ahmed Mabruk	3rd Place: Kristen Ditmore
4th Place: Lindsay Martinez	4th Place: Nick Loftis	4th Place: Kaycie Smith	4th Place: Kelsey Jarzombek	4th Place: Roman Flores
5th Place: Whitney Baker	5th Place: Alyssa Word	5th Place: Ashley Overstreet	5th Place: John Dunavant	5th Place: Kristen Lawrence
6th Place: Shayli Whitaker	6th Place: Ashley Yeaman	6th Place: Jennigale Webb	6th Place: Claire Klimko	6th Place: Lauren Winchester
