= National Schools Press Conference =

Journalism competition between Philippine schools

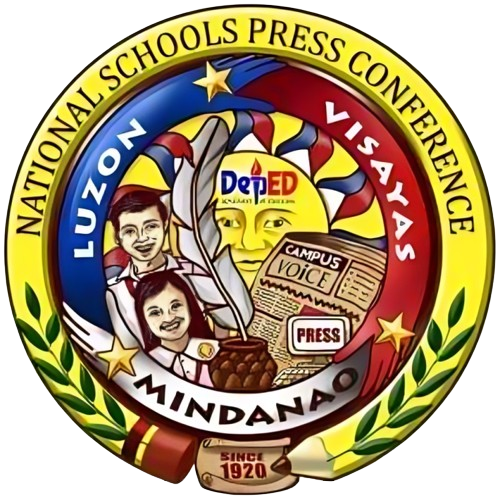
- Official Logo
- Occur every: Annually
- Last event: 2026 in Ormoc City, Leyte
- Next Event: April 19-23, 2027 in Manila, Metro Manila
- Last event theme: "Mapanuri, Mapanindigan, at Mapanagutang Pamamahayag"
- Next event theme: Campus Voices In The Age Of AI: Championing Truth, Transparency, and Accountability
- Organized by: Department of Education (Philippines)

The National Schools Press Conference (NSPC) is the highest competition for journalism for both private and public elementary and secondary schools in the Philippines as per Republic Act 7079, also known as the Campus Journalism Act of 1991. The press conference includes both students from the elementary and secondary level and is usually held on the month of February (July in the post-pandemic until 2025). The event usually lasts for 3 to 5 days.

The journalism contest begins with the Division School's Press Conference (DSPC), where the top three to fifteen in each category, depending on the size of the certain schools division, qualifies for the Regional School's Press Conference (RSPC), from which the top one will be chosen to represent their respective regions in the National School's Press Conference (NSPC). In larger divisions, the districts have the Area School's Press Conference (ASPC), Cluster Schools Press Conference (CSPC), or Municipal Schools Press Conference (MSPC) before the DSPC.

== History ==
In November 1931, the Public Secondary Schools Press Association (PSSPA) had its first convention in what was then Pasig, Rizal. The PSSPA was founded by a high school principal, Ricardo Castro, and had 17 original member schools. During this first convention, writing competitions for the different sections of a school paper were held. The tradition continued year after year, as the number of member-schools increased, with different parts of Luzon as venues. After World War II, the PSSPA was reorganized and 49 member-schools participated in the National Convention held in Manila, Philippines.

By 1955, the PSSPA Convention had become the National Secondary Schools Press Conference. On January 10 and 11 of that year, 70 member-schools attended the conference in Bacolod. The individual competitions were open to all members, while the group competitions were held according to category. Group A for the group competitions was composed of those member-schools with populations of 1,500 and above, while Group B was composed of those member-schools with populations below 1,500. At that same conference, the National Secondary Schools Press Advisers Association was organized and it then passed a resolution calling for the authorization of staff members to handle school paper funds, subject to accounting. The resolution was subsequently approved by the Bureau of Public Schools.

Young campus journalists and advisers

In 1957, a third group classification was added. Group A members were schools with over 3,000 population; Group B members had populations ranging from 1,500 to below 3,000; while Group C members had below 1,500 population. During this year, the conference was held for a longer time, enabling the delegates to take part in longer educational tours of the host locality. A year later, the group classifications were again reorganized, placing schools with over 2,000 population in Group A, those with 1,000 to 2,000 population in Group B, and those with less than 1,000 in Group C. During this year, a Public School Circular was passed authorizing the solicitations of advertisements for school papers, under certain conditions.

In 1991, Republic Act No. 7079 was passed by Congress, aiming to promote campus journalism. The 50th National Secondary Schools Press Conference was held in early 1993 at Rizal High School in Pasig, the same locality that hosted the first PSSPA Convention. The next school year, 1993–1994, elementary schools were included in the convention, causing the word "secondary" to be dropped and the convention to be called the "National Schools Press Conference".

In December 1993, the National Schools Press Conference was to be held in Koronadal, South Cotabato for the first time. However, a week before the convention, when all preparations had been made and the host schools and municipalities were awaiting the arrival of the delegates, there was a bombing incident at Isulan, Sultan Kudarat. The Secretary of the Department of Education, Culture and Sports at that time, Armand Fabella, declared this sufficient grounds to move the convention to Baguio, prompting a storm of protest from then South Cotabato Governor Hilario de Pedro III, who had been one of the sponsors of the Campus Journalism Act when he was Representative of the 2nd District of South Cotabato, and then Representative Daisy Avance Fuentes. This controversy caused the Southern Mindanao delegation to boycott the Baguio conference. Shortly afterwards, Ricardo Gloria replaced Fabella as Education Secretary, and in December 1994 the 52nd National Schools Press Conference was held at Koronadal National Comprehensive High School. In its 65th year, the annual NSPC was held in Koronadal in South Cotabato.

DepEd Director Joyce Andaya, said during the culmination of the 2019 NSPC, in Lingayen, that there is a scheme DepEd follows to come up with a host. In 4 years, they must have a record of 2 Luzon, 1 Visayas and 1 Mindanao hosts.

== Venues ==
The NSPC has been held in different locations across the country. The NSPC is scheduled annually in the middle of the month of March. Recently under DepEd Order 26 s. 2010, it was moved to the second week of April synchronizing all the culminating activities in all competitions as "Festival of Talents". Following is a list of past venues of the NSPC:

As per Joyce Andaya, DepEd Director, Cagayan Valley, particularly Tuguegarao will host the 99th anniversary of Campus Journalism in the Philippines.

Year	Host region	Host city/municipality	Date	Theme
2027	Metro Manila	Manila	April 19-23, 2027	TBA
2026	Eastern Visayas	Ormoc City, Leyte	April 13-17, 2026	"Mapanuri, Mapanindigan, at Mapanagutang Pamamahayag"
2025	Ilocos Region	Vigan City, Ilocos Sur	May 19–23, 2025	"Empowering Filipino Youth: Unleashing Potentials in Journalism and Creative Industries in the Era of AI"
2024	Central Visayas	Carcar City, Cebu	July 8–12, 2024	"Galing, Talino at Husay ng mga Batang Makabansa sa Diwa ng MATATAG na Adhika"
2023	Northern Mindanao	Cagayan de Oro	July 17–20, 2023	"From Campus Journalism to Real World Journalism Shaping Minds from Schools to Societies"
2022	Not held due to COVID-19 pandemic			
2021	Not held due to COVID-19 pandemic			
2020	Cagayan Valley	Tuguegarao	March 9–13, 2020	"Empowering Communities Through Campus Journalism"
2019	Ilocos Region	Lingayen, Pangasinan	January 28–February 1, 2019	"Fostering 21st Century Skills and Character-Based Education through Campus Journalism"
2018	Central Visayas	Dumaguete	February 19–23, 2018	"Embracing ASEAN Integration: Campus Journalists' Role in Advancing Inclusive Education"
2017	Zamboanga Peninsula	Pagadian	January 22–25, 2017	"Strengthening Freedom of Information through Campus Journalism"
2016	Soccsksargen	Koronadal	February 22–26, 2016	"The Role of the 21st Century Campus Journalists in Upholding Good Governance, Leadership and Transparency"
2015	Metro Manila	Taguig	April 13–17, 2015	"Empowering Resilient Communities through Campus Journalism"
2014	Central Luzon	Subic Bay Freeport Zone, Olongapo	April 7–10, 2014	"Campus Journalism and Transformational Leadership"
2013	Eastern Visayas	Ormoc	April 7–12, 2013	"Campus Journalists: Championing Ethics In Social Media"
2012	Mimaropa	Puerto Princesa	April 9–13, 2012	"Promoting Digital Literacy Through Campus Journalism"
2011	Caraga	Butuan	April 11–15, 2011	"Freedom of Expression: A Right and Responsibility"
2010	Davao Region	Tagum	February 22–26, 2010	"Campus Journalism as a Catalyst for Change: Achieving the Sustainable Development Goals by 2050"
2009	Bicol Region	Naga, Camarines Sur	February 14–21, 2009	"Climate Change: A Call for Responsible Campus Journalism"
2008	Soccsksargen	Koronadal	February 18–22, 2008	"Promoting Consumer's Rights Through Campus Journalism"
2007	Cordillera Administrative Region	Baguio	February 19–23, 2007	"Promoting A Culture of Peace Through Responsible Journalism"
2006	Western Visayas	Kalibo, Aklan	February 20–24, 2006	"Responsible and Quality Campus Journalism: Gearing Up to the Challenges of Schools First Initiative
2005	Caraga	Surigao City	February 21–25, 2005	"Redirection of Values for Nation Building Through Campus Journalism"
2004	Calabarzon	Santa Cruz, Laguna	February 24–27, 2004	"Responsible Campus Journalism for A Strong Republic"
2003	Central Visayas	Lapu-Lapu	February 24–27, 2003	"Expanding the Reach of Campus Journalism Through Information and Communication Technology"
2002	SOCCSKSARGEN	General Santos	February 4–7, 2002	"Raising Campus Journalism Standards by Harnessing the Potentials of Information Technology (IT)"
2001	Ilocos Region	Dagupan	February 5–9, 2001	"Promoting Campus Journalism for National Solidarity and Respect for Cultural Diversity"
2000	Eastern Visayas	Tacloban	February 7–11, 2000	"Challenges to the Press Freedom in the New Millennium"
1999	Cagayan Valley	Ilagan	February 8–12, 1999	
1998	Northern Mindanao	Tangub	November 30–December 4, 1998	"Pole Vaulting for Literary-Journalistic Excellence"
1997	Cagayan Valley	Bayombong, Nueva Vizcaya	December 1–5, 1997	
1996	Western Visayas	Victorias	December 2–6, 1996	"Campus Journalists: A Dynamic Force in Promoting the Year of the Heroes"
1995	Central Luzon	Malolos		
1994	Soccsksargen	Koronadal		
1993	Cordillera Administrative Region	Baguio		
1993	Metro Manila	Pasig		
1992	Bicol Region	Naga, Camarines Sur		
1991	Eastern Visayas	Leyte		

== Training and development ==
Students who will compete in the National Schools Press Conference attend seminars before the actual competition. Preparation for the NSPC starts at the District level for public schools with the District Schools Press Conference. Then, towards the Division Level with the Division Schools Press Conference (DSPC). The editorial members of campus papers in a division compete in English or Filipino in different categories. The top three, depending on the region, who will win for each category in each language medium are then qualified for the Regional Schools Press Conference (RSPC). The next two winners are considered alternate qualifiers. Next, the first placer of the RSPC will advance into the National Level, again with the next top two as alternates.

Contest	English	Filipino
Individual	News Writing	Pagsulat ng Balita
Individual	Editorial Writing	Pagsulat ng Editoryal
Individual	Editorial Cartooning	Paglalarawang Tudling
Individual	Column Writing	Pagsulat ng Kolum
Individual	Feature Writing	Pagsulat ng Lathalain
Individual	Science and Technology Writing	Pagsulat ng Agham at Teknolohiya
Individual	Sports Writing	Pagsulat ng Isports
Individual	Copyediting and Headline Writing	Pagwawasto ng Sipi at Pag-uulo ng Balita
Individual	Photojournalism	Pampahayagang Larawan
Individual	Mobile Journalism	Pampahayagang Pangtelepono
Group	Radio Scriptwriting and Broadcasting	Pagsulat ng Iskrip sa Radyo at Pagsasahimpapawid
Group	TV Scriptwriting and Broadcasting	Pagsulat ng Iskrip sa Telebisyon at Pagsasahimpapawid
Group	Collaborative Desktop Publishing	Sama-samang Paglalathala gamit ang Desktop
Group	Online Publishing	Paglalathala sa Online

=== Individual ===
- News Writing – the writing event consists on the creation of articles focused on significant topics gathered.
- Editorial Cartooning – similar to postermaking, the event involves sketching a cartoon that emphasizes a certain theme.
- Editorial Writing – in this category, participants express opinions on relevant issues, crafting persuasive arguments supported by facts.
- Column Writing – participants craft opinion columns that offer insightful commentary on pressing issues, blending personal voice with factual support to persuade and inform readers.
- Feature Writing – participants produce in‑depth, human‑interest stories that explore significant topics through detailed research, interviews, and narrative storytelling techniques.
- Sports Writing – participants report on athletic events and profiles, delivering accurate play‑by‑play accounts, statistics, and insightful analysis of games and athletes.
- Copyediting and Headline Writing – participants proofread provided copy for grammar, style, and accuracy, then create concise, engaging headlines that effectively capture the essence of the story.
- Photojournalism – participants capture and edit photographs that tell compelling news stories, demonstrating strong composition, visual storytelling, and adherence to ethical photojournalistic standards.
- Science and Technology Writing – participants write clear, informative articles on scientific discoveries or technological innovations, translating complex concepts into accessible prose for general audiences.
- Mobile Journalism - participants use smartphones or other portable devices to gather, edit, and publish news content directly from the field.

=== Group ===
- Radio Broadcasting & Script Writing – produces a live radio feature or news segment, writing scripts that integrate narration, interviews, sound effects, and cues to deliver a coherent and engaging audio broadcast.
- Television Broadcasting & Script Writing – creates a televised news or feature segment, drafting scripts that outline dialogue, visuals, camera directions, and transitions to produce a polished TV broadcast.
- Collaborative Desktop Publishing – plans, designs, and produces a multi‑page print publication using desktop‑publishing software, combining text, images, and graphics to create a cohesive newspaper or magazine layout.
- Online Publishing – develops and manages a digital news platform, writing articles, curating multimedia and interactive content, and designing web layouts to engage readers through dynamic online storytelling.

=== Development ===
On October 6, 1999, however, Education Secretary Andrew Gonzales issued DECS Memorandum No. 437, Series of 1999, which stated that a contestant could participate in only two events and in only one medium provided that the two events did not conflict with each other. This was amended in 2002 with the issuance of DepEd Memorandum No. 4, Series of 2002, on January 11, 2002, by Education Secretary Raul Roco. DM No. 4 provided that a pupil or student could participate in a maximum of four events but in only one medium, and that there should be seven winners for every category from every region.

The News Reporting and Desktop Publishing categories were first introduced in 2003, with a demonstration having been held at the previous year's NSPC. The DepEd memorandum for this same year states that a student may opt to participate in as many categories as he is able within the same medium provided there are no conflicts in the schedule.

The 2012 National Schools Press Conference had a focus on digital literacy and its use in campus journalism, with a collaborative publishing contest launched, involving teams of seven students making a four-page tabloid using Microsoft Publisher and Adobe InDesign.

Starting on the 2016 National Schools Press Conference, a new group contest was added, the Television Broadcasting and Script Writing, wherein like its radio counterpart the participating students stimulated a live TV newscast from anchoring to production. It started as an exhibitional contest and eventually became a formal group contest in 2017.

== See also ==
- Department of Education (Philippines)
- Palanca Awards
