= Jack and Jill School =

Jack & Jill School

Information
- Former names: Jack & Jill Kindergarten
- Type: Private
- Motto: Developing Thinkers and Leaders of Tomorrow
- Established: 1963
- Closed: June 30, 2023
- Enrollment: over 600 (Preschool and Elementary)
- Campus: Urban, 1.5 hectares
- Colors: Green and White
- Affiliation: NOPSSCEA, Department of Education (Philippines)
- Website: www.jjscastleson.org

Jack & Jill School is a former preschool and elementary institution, which was located in Homesite and City Heights in Bacolod, the capital of Negros Occidental province of the Philippines. Informally referred to by its acronym "JJS", it was a private, non-sectarian, educational institution with an enrollment of more than 600 pupils. The out-of-town branch was located in Magsaysay St. in Victorias City.

It was one of the few institutions in the country where Karate was part of the school curriculum; Karate was included in physical education class all year round. The school closed in 2023, after 60 years of operation, due to falling enrollment.

== History ==
Jack & Jill School-Homesite

Jack & Jill School was founded by Cecilia del Castillo-Lopez as a preschool in 1963. She converted her living room into a classroom and started teaching to 23 boys and girls from the small neighborhood of Homesite. In 1979, Jack & Jill Kinder School in Homesite expanded to include an elementary school. A few years later, another elementary branch in Victorias was opened in 1981. The year 1995 resulted in the simultaneous establishment of Castleson High in Homesite, Castleson High in City Heights, and Sidera Special Child Center in City Heights. In the next year, Castleson High Schools in Homesite and City Heights were merged to become one school located in City Heights Subdivision. Throughout Jack & Jill School's history, other branches in Airport, La Granja, Paglaum, and La Carlota were also opened and later closed. School year 2013 will celebrates Golden Jubillee Year in Jack and Jill School-Homesite in Bacolod City. Karate is the famous game in the school.

== Closure ==
After 60 years of service to the community, Jack & Jill Schools and Castleson High Schools permanently close their doors on June 30, 2023. Due to the reverberating effects of the pandemic, management indicated the insurmountable burden on its finances despite a swift conversion to online classes and intensive teacher training. Dr. Muriel Lopez-Wagner, president at the time of closure, stated that they have been grieving the loss of Mrs. Cecilia del Castillo Lopez since 2020 as well as feeling the distress as they watched the decrease in enrollment year after year. "I think several significant factors led to the ultimate financial collapse, where the only way out was to sell a building", said Lopez. At the same time, she expressed her deepest gratitude to hundreds of parents, students, alumni, teachers, staff, and loyal supporters who will always carry the Jack & Jill trademark and love. School staff prepared for a smooth transfer of their current students to other schools.

== Administration ==
Cecilia del Castillo-Lopez oversaw the schools' financial affairs until her death in 2020. Her daughter served as President while her grandson served as Vice-President of Finance and Administration. The Director of Academic Affairs oversaw all schools and provided support in terms of curriculum and resources. The school year 2010-11 marked the transitional year when Mrs. Lopez relinquished the decision-making tasks to the president and the current director.

== Up the Hill ==
Outstanding campus journalists & adviser

Up the Hill is a student run newspaper that provides opportunities for student writers and was a creative medium for students to showcase their poems, essays, writings, and drawings in English and Tagalog languages. Today, the school publication continues to flourish and has won many journalism awards around the country.

- Department of Education DepED Editors Guild of the Philippines
- Regional English Circle – Western Visayas
- Department of Education (Philippines) DepED achievers in Division, Regional, National Schools Press Conferences and Golden Pen Awards.
- Victory at NSPC by Sofia Isabelle Ortiz Grade 6-Batch 2008

The Up the Hill Staff has produced a number of winners and outstanding writers from division, regional up to national level competitions under Rhazel E. Mengullo as school paper adviser. Captured two national awards in Sports writing by Aljenica Marie Apostol and Photojournalism by Sofia Isabelle Ortiz during the 2000 and 2008 National Schools Press Conference (NSPC), the highest competition of writing in the country recognized by the Department of Education (Philippines). Six first placers during Regional Schools Press Conference (RSPC) in different events likewise recipients of five Golden Pen Awards, four outstanding writers and outstanding journalism mentor awards in Western Visayas. It has been awarded three times as DSPC Overall Champion and two times as overall champion in Regional Cluster writeshop and Golden Pen Awards. Grand prize winner of 2nd Regional writing and public speaking tilt.

== Karate ==
Karate-do was part of its curriculum wherein pupils from Grades 1-6 are required to join the training as part of their Physical Education (P.E.) activity for the whole year round at JJS Campuses.

Team JJS Karatedo is the home of Super Karate Kids in the Negros Province was initiated by sensei Randy Mengullo, a Sandan Blackbelt in karate-do attended the 13th KOI Karate World Cup and Training Camp participated by 25 nations. JJS Karate Team KFS garnered medals in many karatedo championships and athletic meet of different schools and karate organizations in the Philippines. JJSKarate adapt Shotokan style, affiliated to national association of Philippine Karatedo Traditional & Sports (PKTS) and member of Philippine Karatedo Federation the governing body of sport karate in the country. Official training center of Milo Sports Clinic.

JJS Homesite and City Heights are members of Negros Occidental Private Schools Sports Cultural Educational Association (NOPSSCEA) and one of the founding schools that organized the Karatedo event since school year 2005 as part of the NOPSSCEA regular sports annually. It was also a founding member of Negros Occidental Karatedo Federation (NOKAF) in the 2000s (decade). Aside from NOPSSCEA, the Karatedo Team participates in the PKF Regional and National Championships, Mayor's Cup of Hon. Evelio Leonardia and Monico Cup Regional Championship, the PSC grass roots program Ang Batang Pinoy, Philippine National Youth Games, Philippine Olympic Festival, UMA-ONEBA Presidential Cup, Philippine Sports Commission-Philippine Olympic Committee Tournaments and athletic meet of different schools in the Philippines.

== Gallery ==
Golden Pen Awards Overall champ

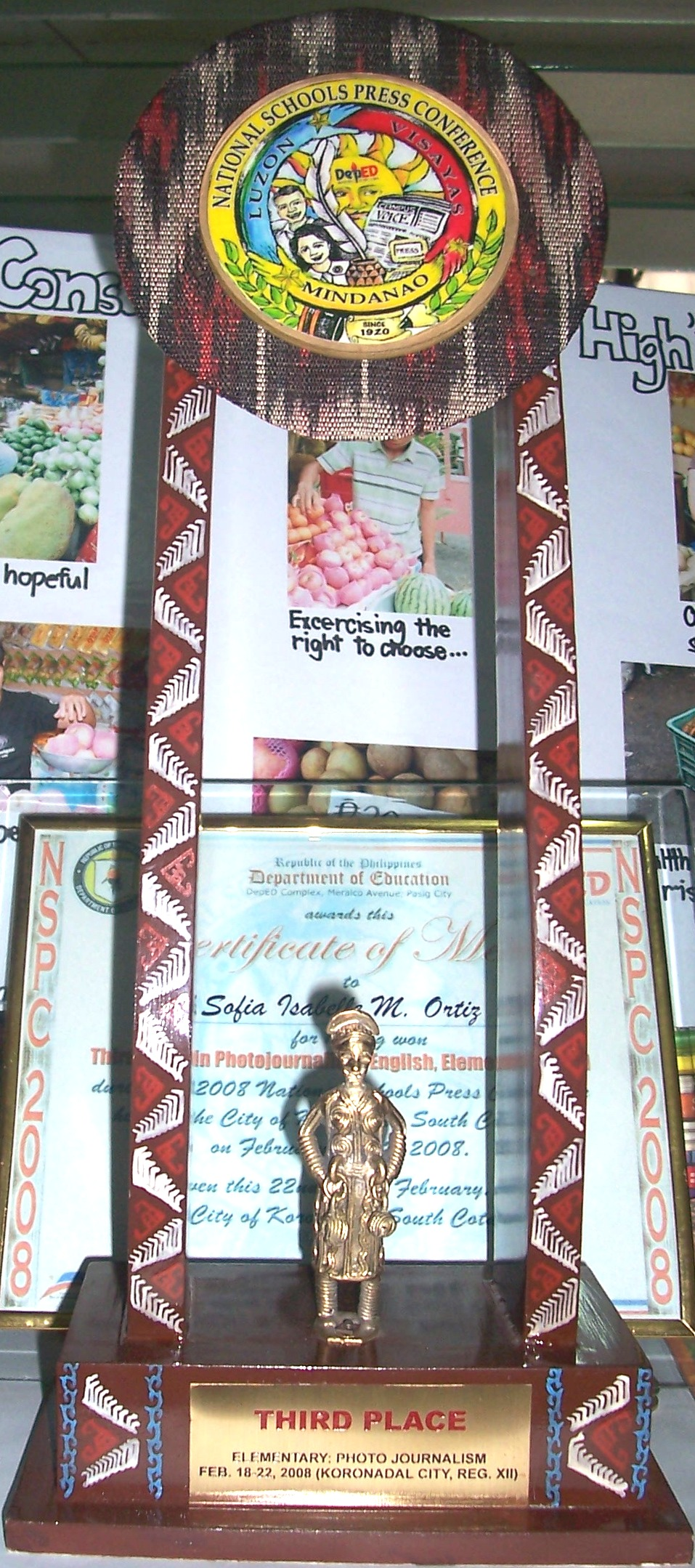
DepEd NSPC National Winner

PKF National Winners

POF National Winners

National Gold Medalist

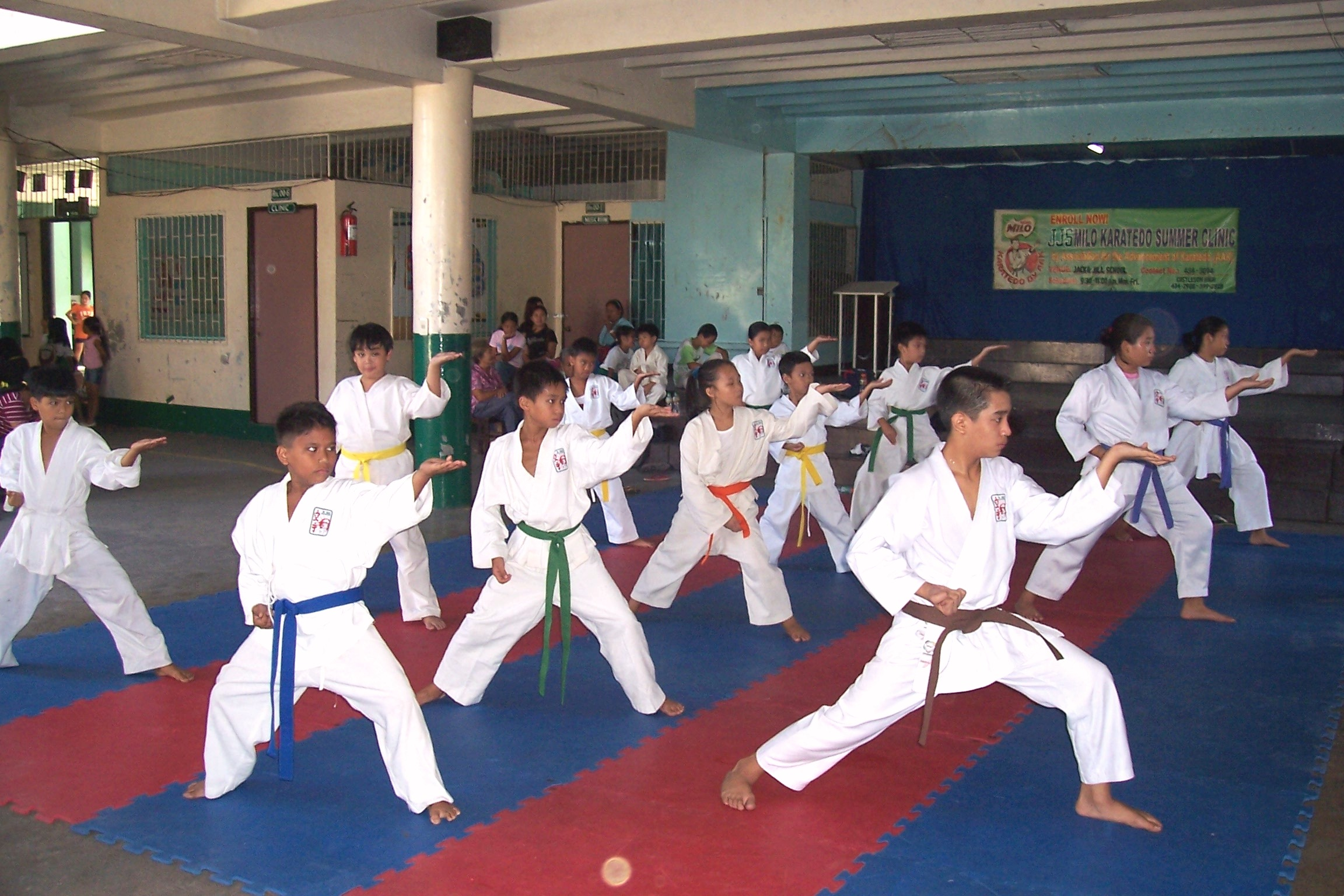
Team KFS-JJS Karate

== See also ==
- Castleson High
