= JJ Dunnigan =

American football player (born 2008)

No. 25 – Miami Hurricanes
- Position: Safety
- Class: Freshman

Personal information
- Born: June 20, 2008 (age 18)
- Listed height: 6 ft 3 in (1.91 m)
- Listed weight: 205 lb (93 kg)

Career information
- High school: Manhattan (Manhattan, Kansas)
- College: Miami (2026–present)
- Stats at ESPN

JJ Dunnigan (born June 20, 2008) is an American college football safety for the Miami Hurricanes.

== Early life ==
Dunnigan attended Manhattan High School in Manhattan, Kansas, where he played defensive back and wide receiver. As a junior in 2024 he was named the Centennial League 6A Defensive Player of the Year after recording 65 tackles, three interceptions and two forced fumbles. He also had 28 receptions for 556 yards on offense. As a senior in 2025, Dunningan was the Fall All-Flint Hills Male Athlete of the Year and the 2024-25 VYPE Kansas Football Player of the Year after helping lead his Manhattan to their first state championship in school history. He finished the season with 48 tackles on defense and 17 receptions for 328 and seven touchdowns on offense. He also had a blocked field goal, two punt return touchdowns and one kickoff return touchdown on special teams. Dunningan originally committed to play college football at the University of Kansas before flipping his commitment to the University of Miami.

== College career ==
Dunnigan competed for early playing his freshman year at Miami in 2026. He had his first career interception against Clemson which he returned 39 yards for a touchdown.
