= Iloilo City =

Highly-urbanized city in Western Visayas, Philippines

- Highly urbanized city
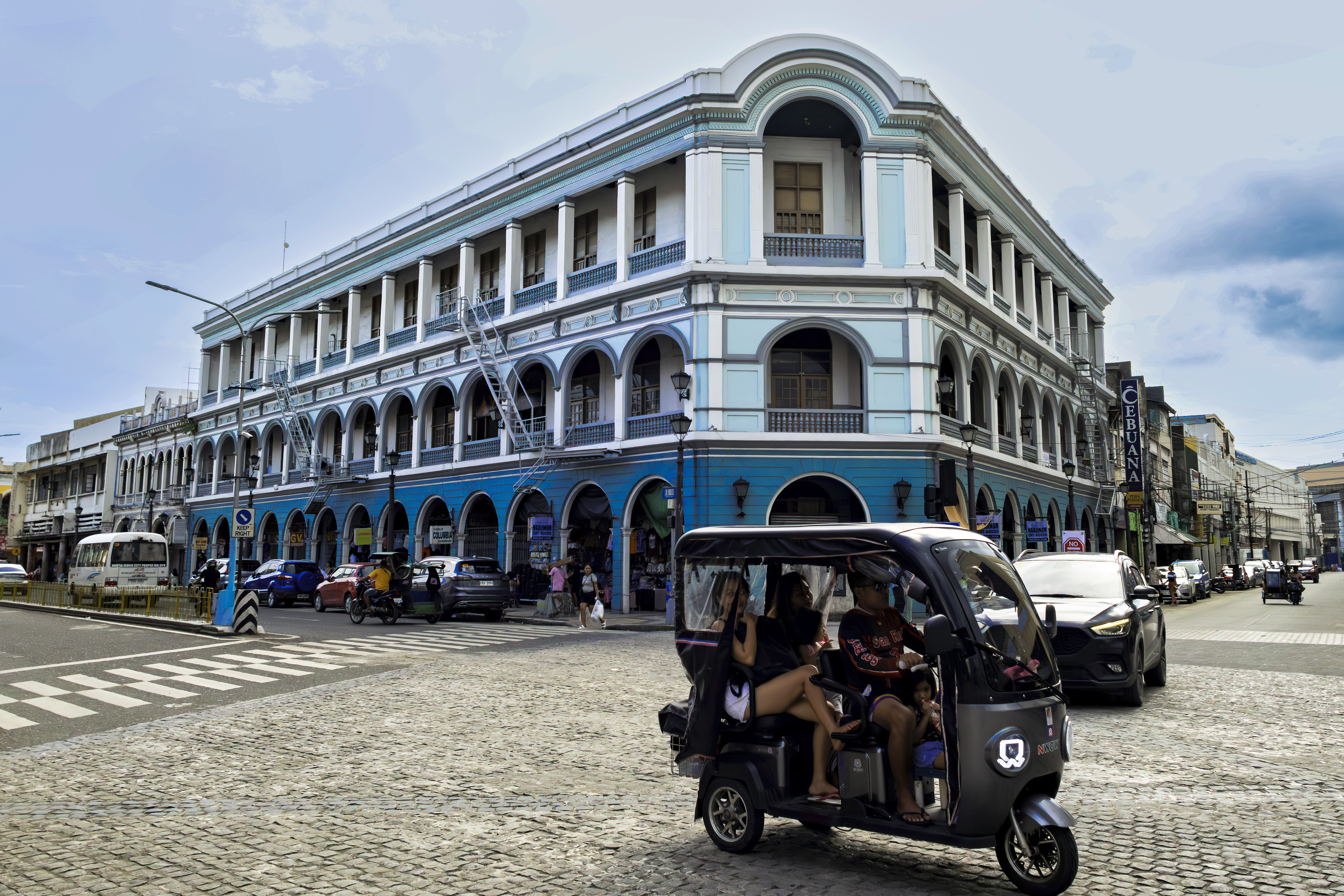
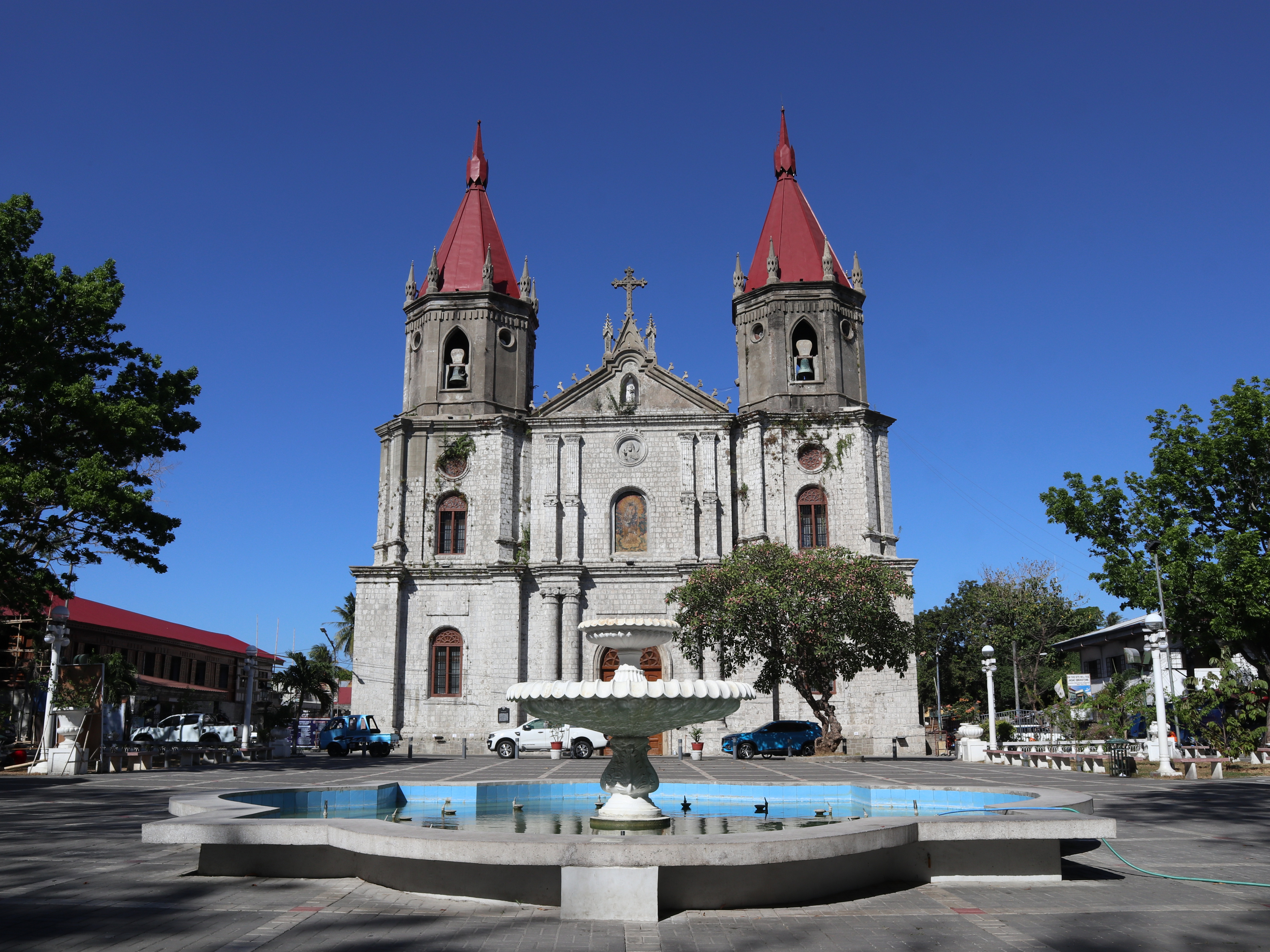
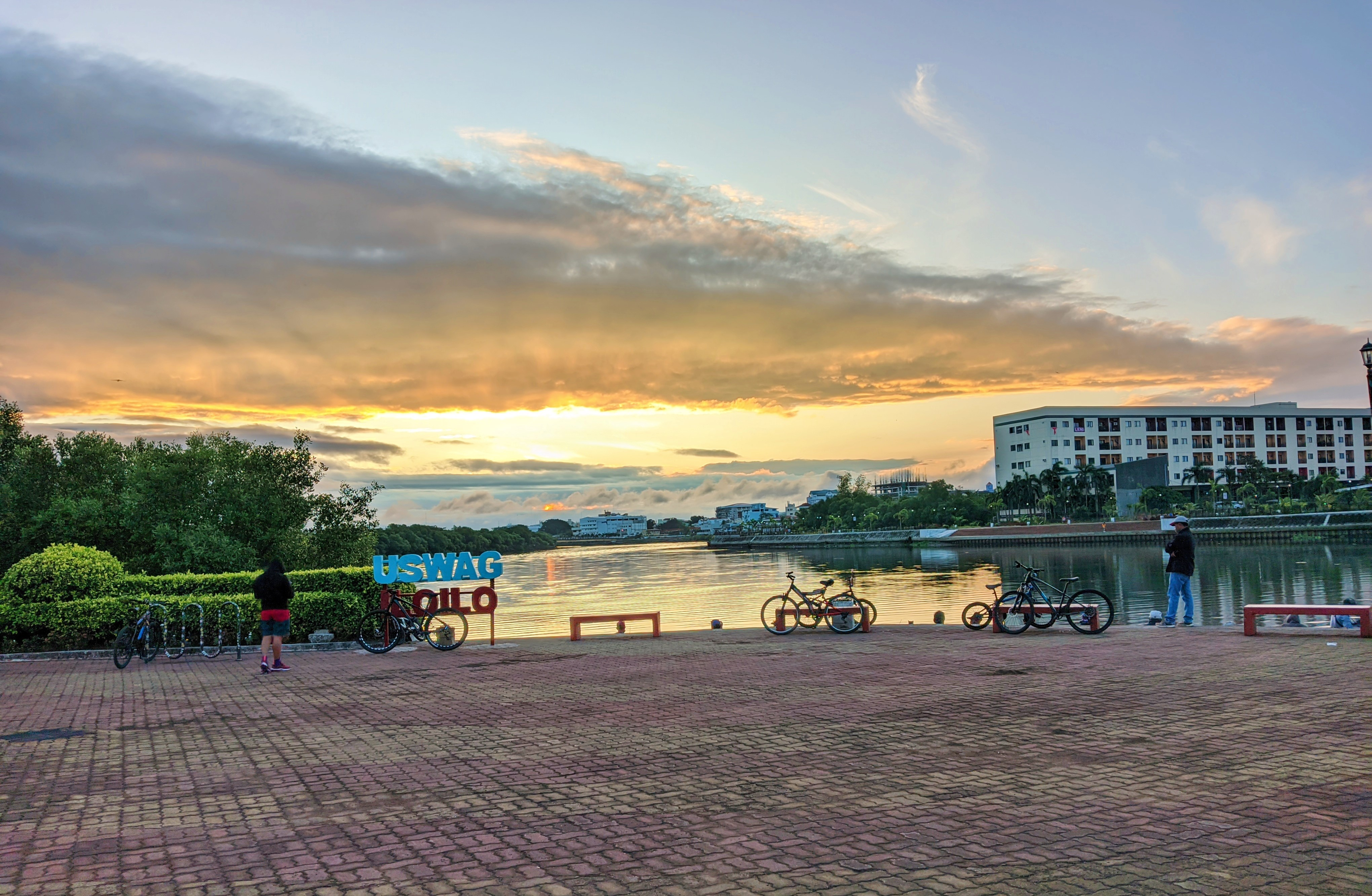
- Mandurriao district skyline Calle Real Molo Church ICON Jaro Belfry Molo Mansion Jaro Metropolitan Cathedral Iloilo River Esplanade

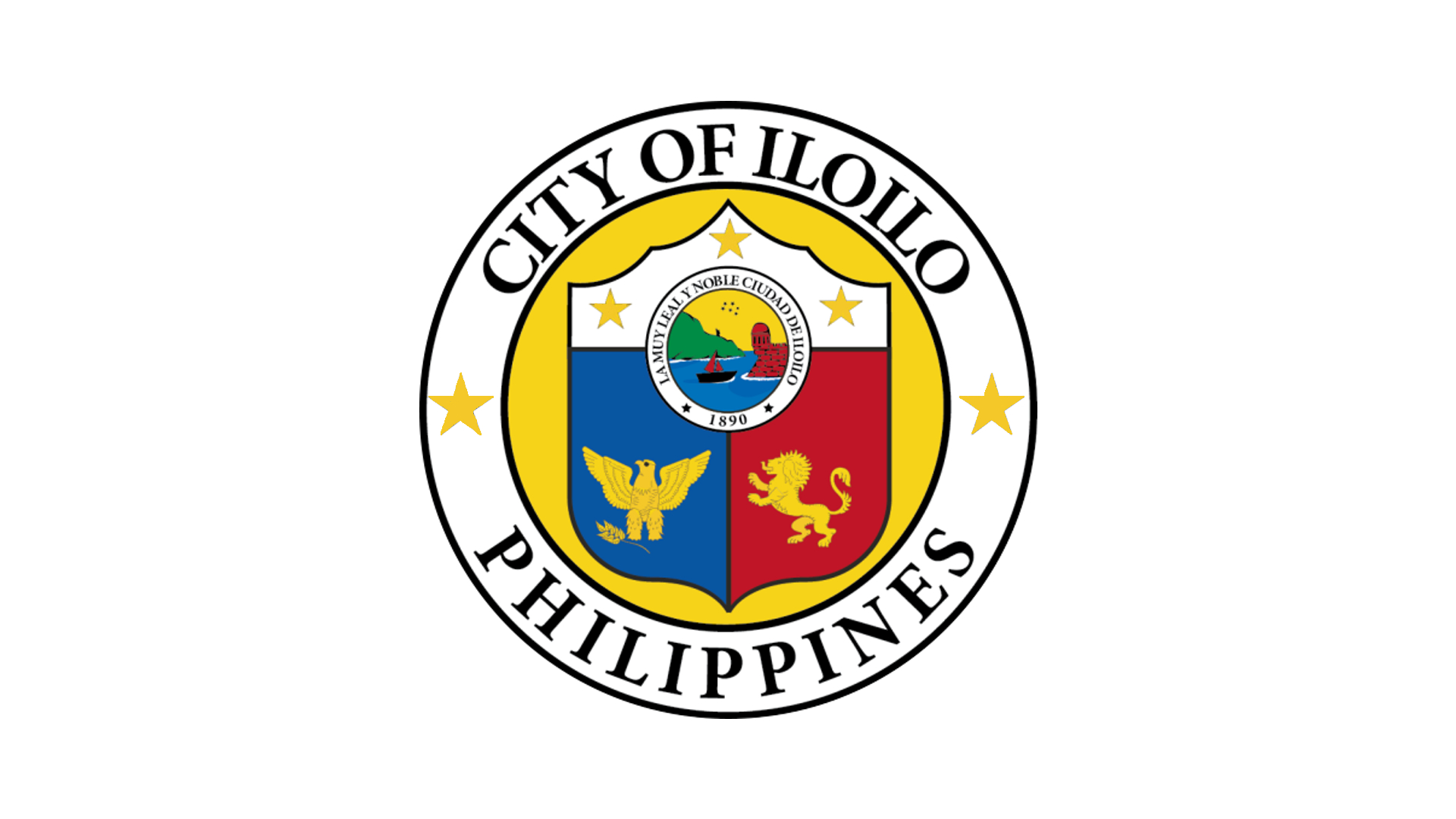
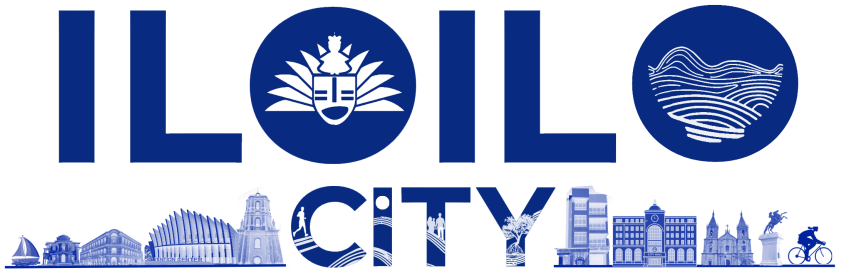
- Flag Seal Logo and wordmark
- Nicknames: City of Love and others
- Motto(s): La muy leal y noble ciudad de Iloílo (Spanish) (English: "The Most Loyal and Noble City of Iloilo")
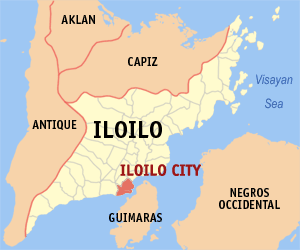
- Map of Western Visayas with Iloilo City highlighted
- Interactive map of Iloilo City
- Location within the Philippines
- Coordinates: 10°42′N 122°34′E
- Country: Philippines
- Region: Western Visayas
- Province: Iloilo (geographically only)
- District: Lone district
- Founded: 1566 (Spanish settlement)
- Cityhood: October 5, 1889
- City charter: August 25, 1937
- Highly urbanized city: December 22, 1979
- Barangays: 180 (see Barangays and districts)
- City geographical districts: List: Arevalo; City Proper; Jaro; La Paz; Lapuz; Mandurriao; Molo

Government
  - Type: Sangguniang Panlungsod
  - Mayor: Raisa Maria Lourdes S. Treñas-Chu (NUP)
  - Vice Mayor: Lady Julie Grace L. Baronda (Lakas)
  - City Representative: Julienne L. Baronda (Lakas)
  - City Council: Members: Sedfrey L. Cabaluna (NUP); Jose Maria Miguel S. Treñas (PFP); Rex Marcus B. Sarabia (NUP); Alan A. Zaldivar (PFP); Lyndon V. Acap (NUP); Jose Maria B. Dela Llana (PFP); Mandrie T. Malabor (NUP); Johnny Y. Young (PFP); Romel D. Duron (PFP); Rudolph Jeffrey O. Ganzon (NUP); Sheen Marie S. Mabilog (Lakas); Frances Graces V. Parcon-Torres (PFP); Marie Irene D. Ong ^{‡}; Jelma Crystel D. Implica ^{◌}; ‡ ex officio ABC president; ◌ ex officio SK chairman
  - Electorate: 330,621 voters (2025)

Area
  - City: 78.34 km^{2} (30.25 sq mi)
  - Urban: 91 km^{2} (35 sq mi)
  - Metro: 1,105.53 km^{2} (426.85 sq mi)
- Elevation: 21 m (69 ft)
- Highest elevation: 175 m (574 ft)
- Lowest elevation: −1 m (−3.3 ft)

Population (2024 census)
  - City: 473,728
  - Density: 6,047/km^{2} (15,660/sq mi)
  - Urban: 574,000
  - Urban density: 6,300/km^{2} (16,000/sq mi)
  - Metro: 1,039,935
  - Metro density: 940.666/km^{2} (2,436.31/sq mi)
  - Households: 104,313
- Demonym(s): Ilonggo (en), Ilonggo (f. -a) (hil/fil), ilongo (f. -a) (es)

Economy
  - Gross domestic product (GDP): ₱145.05 billion (2022) $2.563 billion (2022)
  - Income class: 1st city income class
  - Poverty incidence: 3.7% (2023)
  - HDI: ▲0.885 (Very High)
  - Revenue: ₱ 5,083 million (2024)
  - Assets: ₱ 39,478 million (2024)
  - Expenditure: ₱ 4,025 million (2024)
  - Liabilities: ₱ 4,598 million (2024)

Service provider
  - Electricity: Monte Oro Resource Electric and Power Corporation (MORE)
  - Water: Metro Pacific Iloilo Water (MPIW)
- Time zone: UTC+8 (PST)
- ZIP code: 5000
- PSGC: 063022000
- IDD : area code: +63 (0)33
- Native languages: Hiligaynon/Ilonggo
- Catholic diocese: Archdiocese of Jaro
- Patron saint: Nuestra Señora de la Purificación y la Candelaria (English: Our Lady of Purification and Candle)
- Website: iloilocity.gov.ph

Iloilo City, officially the City of Iloilo (Hiligaynon: Dakbanwa sang Iloilo; Tagalog: Lungsod ng Iloilo; Spanish: Ciudad de Iloílo), is a highly urbanized city in the Western Visayas region of the Philippines, located on the southeastern coast of the island of Panay. According to the 2024 census, it has a population of 473,728 people, making it the most populous city in Western Visayas. For the Iloilo–Guimaras metropolitan area, the total population is 1,039,935 people.

The city is a conglomeration of former towns, now organized into seven geographical or administrative districts: the City Proper, Jaro, Molo, Mandurriao, La Paz, Arevalo, and Lapuz. It is the largest city and capital of the Iloilo province, where the city is geographically situated and grouped under the Philippine Statistics Authority, but remains politically independent in terms of government and administration. Iloilo City is the regional center of Western Visayas and serves as the hub for trade, commerce, industry, education, religion, healthcare, tourism, culture, and culinary arts.

In 1566, the Spanish settled in Iloilo, establishing it as the second Spanish colonial center in the Philippines after Cebu. The city was bestowed with the honorific title "La Muy Leal y Noble Ciudad" (Most Loyal and Noble City) by Queen Regent Maria Christina of Austria in recognition of its loyalty to the Spanish crown during the Philippine Revolution. Iloilo City served as the last capital of the Spanish Empire in Asia and the Pacific before the Philippines was ceded to the United States in 1898 through the Treaty of Paris. At the turn of the 20th century, Iloilo City was considered the second most important city in the Philippines, next to Manila, and was widely known as the "Queen City of the South."

Recognized as a UNESCO Creative City of Gastronomy, Iloilo City is known for its signature dishes such as La Paz Batchoy, Pancit Molo, Kadyos-Baboy-Langka (KBL), Laswa, and Kansi. Iloilo City has several heritage sites from the Spanish and American colonial periods, including the Calle Real Heritage Zone. Iloilo City is considered a pilgrim city and is known as the center of Candelaria devotion in the Philippines, as it home to the Nuestra Señora de la Candelaria de Jaro, the first Marian image in Asia to be canonically crowned in person by a pope, now Saint John Paul II. The city is known for the Dinagyang Festival, a popular cultural and religious festival held every January, in honor of Santo Niño.

Iloilo City is among the fastest-developing cities in the Philippines, experiencing significant annual growth since the redevelopment of the old airport in Mandurriao. The IT-BPM industry in the city continues to thrive and remains in high demand. It has been recognized as a top location for outsourcing expansion outside Metro Manila and is the third-largest hub for the industry in the country.

== Etymology ==
The name "Iloilo" is derived from the older name "Irong-irong" (Philippine Spanish: Ilong̃-ílong̃) meaning "nose-like", referring to the promontory between two rivers (Iloilo and Batiano) where the Fort San Pedro and the 17th-century Spanish port were located.

== History ==
=== Early history ===
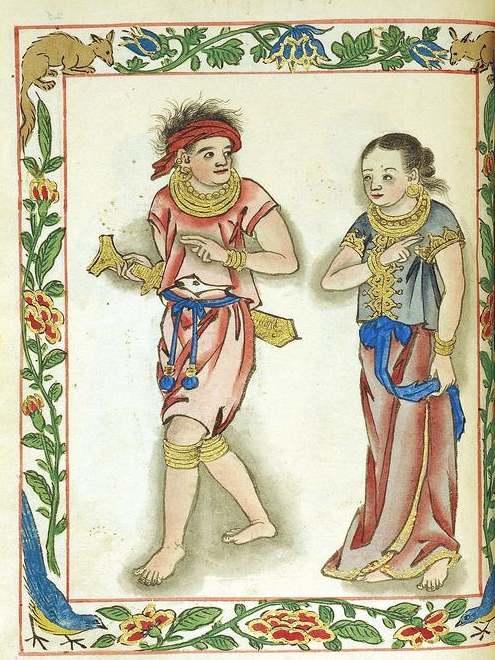
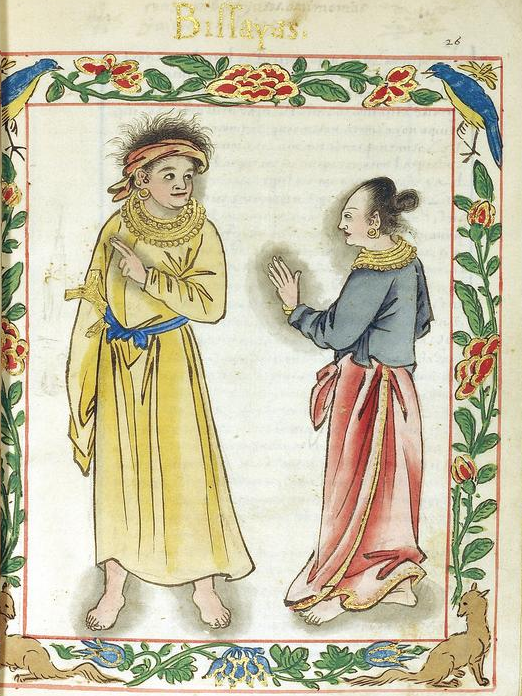
Images from the Boxer Codex, c. 1595, illustrating ancient Visayans

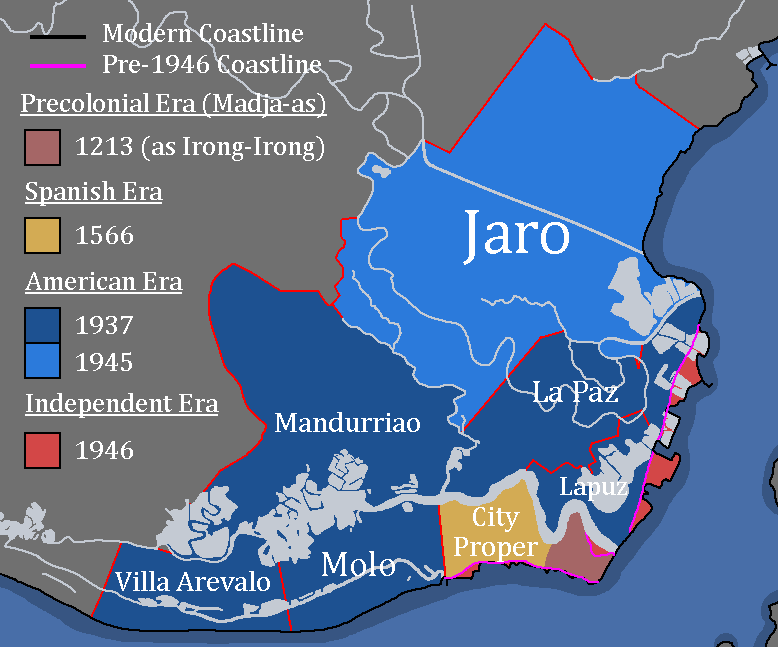
The territorial expansion of Iloilo City.

The earliest written reference to Iloilo appears in Yuan Dynasty records from the 1300s, identifying Oton—west of Iloilo City—as in Hokkien Chinese: 啞陳; Pe̍h-ōe-jī: A-tân, a bustling trade outpost in the Visayas.

Although, little is known historically about the region prior to the arrival of the Spanish, Jesuit missionary Francisco Ignacio Alcina, in his 1668 work Historia natural del sitio, fertilidad y calidad de las Islas e Indios de Bisayas, identifies the Hiligaynon people originated from Leyte, aligning with linguistic subgrouping of the Hiligaynon language.

Local legends, notably the epic Maragtas by Pedro Monteclaro (published 1907), offer a different origin story. It describes how ten datus, led by Datu Puti, fled Borneo to escape the tyrant Sultan Makatunaw, arriving in Panay and purchasing its lowlands from the Ati king Marikudo with a golden salakot and a necklace for his queen, Maniwan-tiwan. The transaction, followed by a pact of friendship, is said to have inspired the Dinagyang Festival.

Though once widely accepted and included in school textbooks, Maragtas (along with the Code of Kalantiaw) is now considered a 20th-century hoax, a view solidified by historian William Henry Scott’s 1968 critique, upheld by experts like Gregorio Zaide and Teodoro Agoncillo. A 2019 thesis by Talaguit cites an earlier version of the story by Augustinian Friar Rev. Fr. Tomas Santaren (1902), based on manuscripts he obtained in Iloilo after 1858. Though Santaren's account supports Monteclaro's, the manuscripts, written in romanized Hiligaynon during the colonial era, likely reflect oral folklore rather than pre-colonial history. Thus, while Maragtas may reflect elements of local folk history, it is unlikely to be a pre-colonial document and is not regarded as authentic history but rather a blend of tradition and invention. Albeit it is argued that the nearby miraculous and syncretistic image of our Nuestra Señora de la Candelaria de Jaro which show partial pre-colonial origins, also postulate that the people of Panay and Iloilo have origins to Borneo and to ancient Srivijaya, the alleged root of the Visayans as the Golden Elephant worn by the Christ-Child is the most holy animal in Buddhism and Hinduism, which is the religion the Srivijaya Empire practiced.

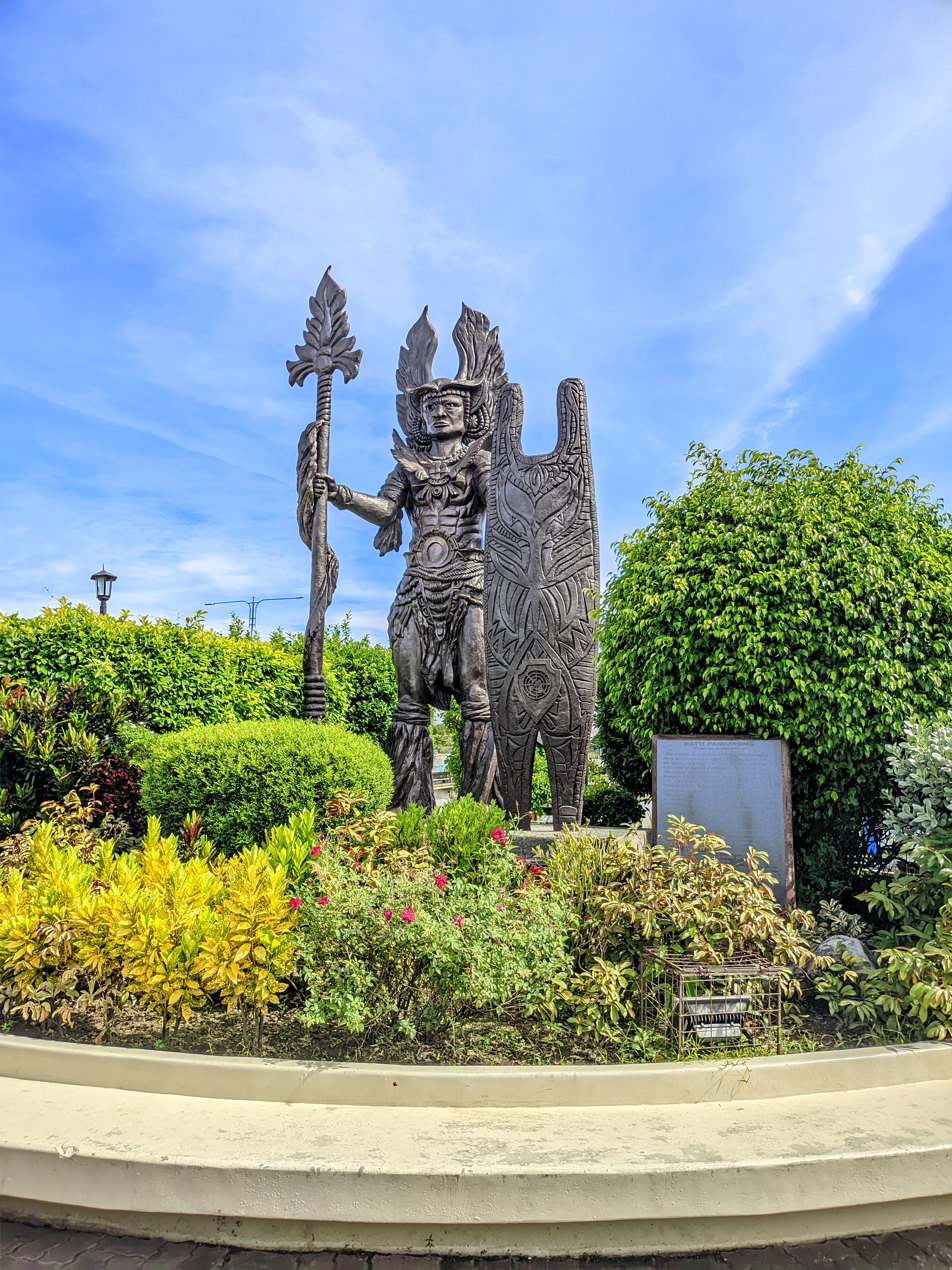
Datu Paiburong, the first Bornean datu of Irong-Irong (Iloilo), is honored with a statue in Iloilo River Esplanade.

Within the context of this folklore, Datu Paiburong is identified as one of the ten datus from Borneo who settled in Panay Island and is traditionally regarded as the first ruler of Irong-Irong, the area corresponding to present-day Iloilo. He is said to have established a polity that became a center of trade and agriculture, contributing to the early socio-political development of Western Visayas.

As the ruling datu of Irong-Irong, Paiburong is credited with organizing one of the earliest systems of local governance in the region, fostering alliances with other datus of Panay and codifying customary laws that promoted order and cooperation among early settlers. Although his existence is not corroborated by contemporary historical sources, Datu Paiburong remains a significant cultural figure in Iloilo's precolonial heritage, symbolizing the region's legendary beginnings and the enduring memory of Visayan leadership prior to Spanish colonization.

=== Spanish period ===
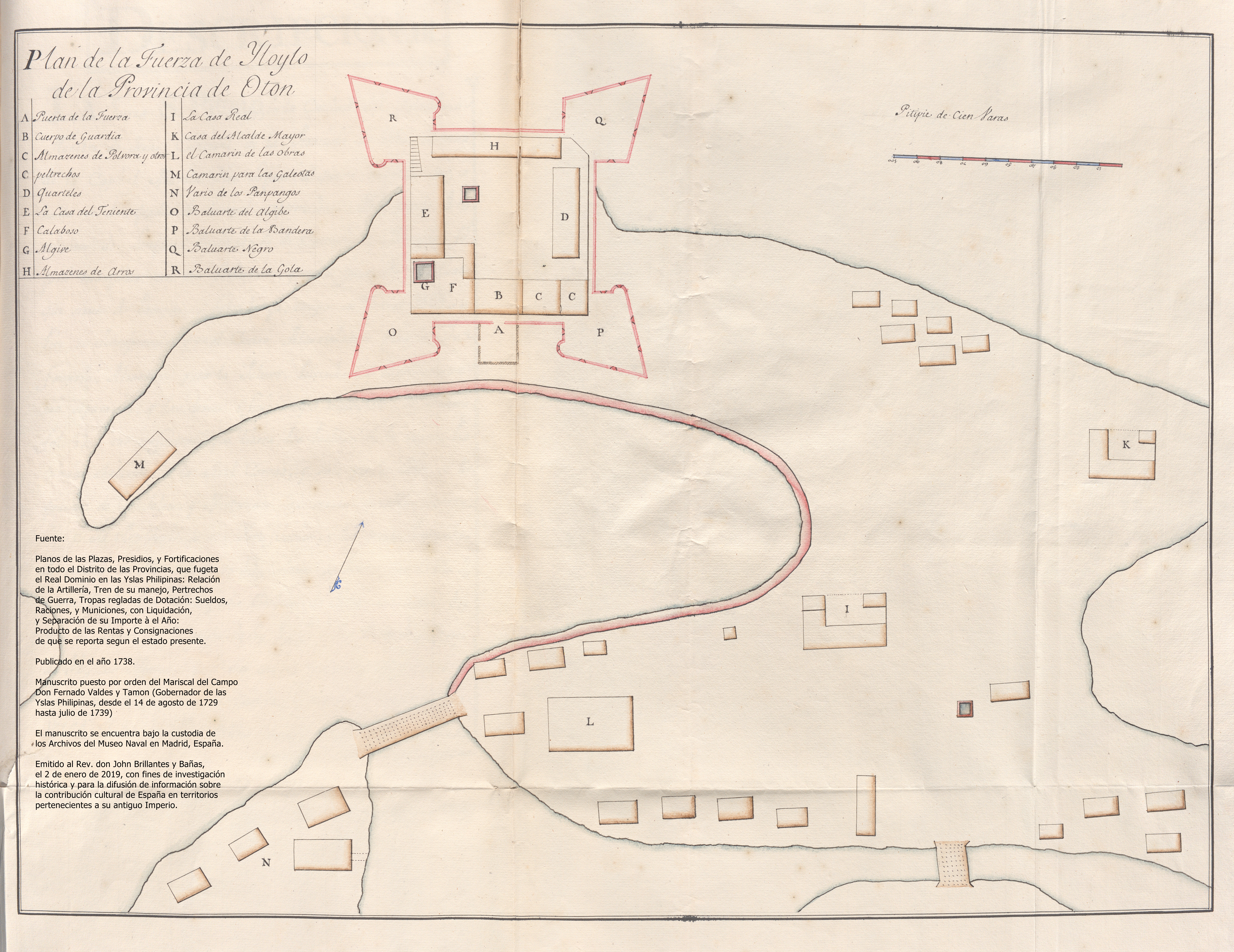
Drafted plan of the Fort of Iloilo in 1738, originally named the Fortificación de Nuestra Señora del Rosario en el Puerto de Yloylo.

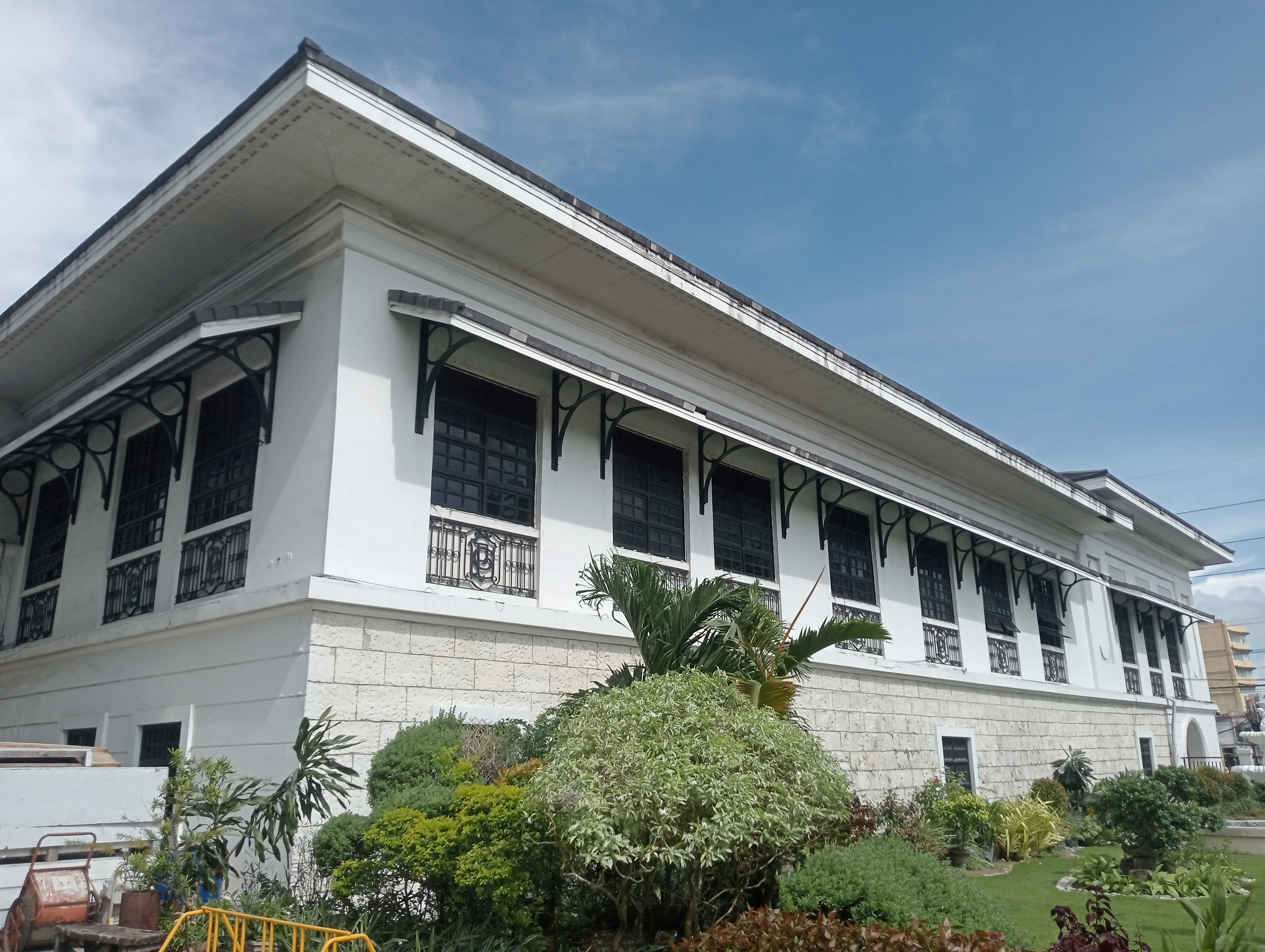
Casa Real de Iloilo was the official residence and administrative seat of the Spanish governor and alcalde mayor during the colonial period.

Under Philip II in 1565, Miguel López de Legazpi, tasked with expanding Spanish dominion in the Philippines, sent his grandson Felipe de Salcedo, alongside Augustinian missionaries such as Martín de Rada, to explore the Visayas for resources. Landing on Panay, they established a temporary settlement in Araut, to secure food supplies amid scarcity in Cebu. By 1566, a more permanent foothold emerged between Ogtong (Oton) and La Villa Rica de Arevalo, formalized when Oton was established as a colonial outpost in 1572 under Legazpi's command. This made Oton the second official Spanish settlement in the archipelago after Cebu. The city was founded by 80 pure Spaniards from Europe. In 1586, it welcomed another 20 European Spanish Households and the garrison was reinforced by 30 Spanish and Mexican soldiers. This was reinforced by a consecutive number of 66, 50, 169, and then another 169 Mexican soldiers from Latin America during the years 1603, 1636, 1670, and 1672. Later in the 1700s, Iloilo was home to 166 Spanish Filipino families and 29,723 native families. Of which 103 Spanish-Filipino families were in downtown Iloilo city proper alone, while another 23 Spanish-Filipino families lived in the separate Chinatown of Molo, other natives and mestizos were scattered across the varying cities and municipalities of province. And excluding the pure Spanish-Filipinos, there were still 470 Spanish-Filipino mestizo families; as well as 11 pure Chinese-Filipino families, and 665 Chinese-Filipino mestizo families that were scattered all across the province of Iloilo.

The people of Panay, unlike the neutral Cebuanos or the partially Islamized Tagalogs of Manila who resisted Spanish rule, embraced the Iberians as allies. At the time, Panay was embroiled in a struggle against Muslim forces from the Sultanate of Brunei and its vassals, the Sultanate of Sulu and the Kingdom of Maynila, which Spanish Governor-General Francisco de Sande described as kin to the locals. The alliance proved pivotal, as Panay natives supplied a significant portion of the mercenary forces used to subdue Manila's rulers, who were tied to Brunei. The rapid adoption of Christianity among the Panaynons facilitated their integration into the Spanish colonial framework. Before Spanish contact, Visayan groups, including those from Panay, were notorious for their piracy and slave-raiding expeditions, known locally as panggubat. The raids, often launched after harvests or during specific months like February to April, targeted coastal and inland settlements across the archipelago, striking fear into neighboring regions. Under Spanish influence, Christianization and Hispanization transformed these fierce raiders into disciplined soldiers and farmers, marking a significant cultural shift.

In 1581, recurrent attacks by Moro pirates and Dutch and English privateers forced Gonzalo Ronquillo de Peñaloza, the Spanish governor, to relocate the colonial center from Ogtong approximately 12 kilometres (7.5 mi) eastward to La Villa Rica de Arevalo. Named in honor of Ronquillo's hometown in Ávila, Spain, Arevalo became a hub for Spanish and Mexican settlers, who built residences and fortifications. Chinese traders, vital to the colony's economy, established a commercial district in the nearby parian of Molo, supplying goods to the growing settlement. In 1700, escalating raids, particularly from Dutch forces and Moro pirates, necessitated another move to Irong-Irong, a village with a natural and strategic river-mouth location against raids. There, the Spanish erected the Fortificación de Nuestra Señora del Rosario en el Puerto de Yloylo, now known as Fort San Pedro, to protect the burgeoning port. Over time, Irong-Irong's name evolved into Iloilo, and the site quickly rose as the administrative and economic center of the province.

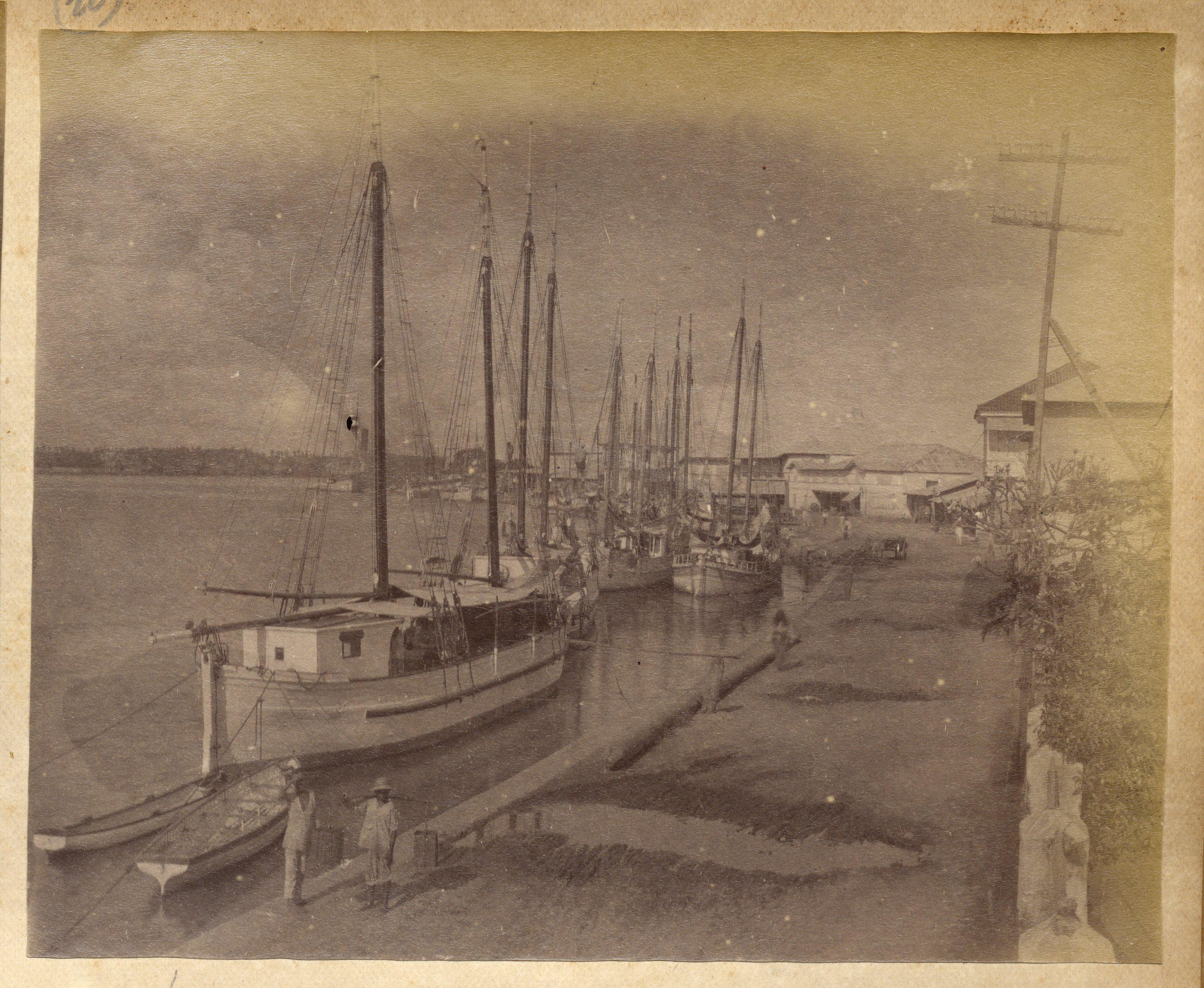
The view of the Port of Iloilo’s harbor and warehouses in 1894.

Iloilo’s demographic and economic landscape expanded with the arrival of Chinese migrants, who fueled local industries, and Latin American soldiers, who manned its defenses. In the late 18th century, the city became a center for large-scale textile production and was once referred to as the "textile capital" of the Philippines. Artisans wove sinamay, piña, and jusi fabrics, which were traded in Manila and exported to international markets. The industry thrived until the mid-19th century, when competition from inexpensive British textiles and the shift to sugar production diminished its prominence. The opening of Iloilo's port to global trade in 1855 marked a turning point, driven by British vice-consul Nicholas Loney, who provided loans, built warehouses, and introduced modern sugar-farming techniques. The resulting sugar boom, centered on haciendas developed by Iloilo's elite on Negros, transformed the city, attracting foreign consulates, banks, and recreational facilities while elevating the status of its upper middle class.

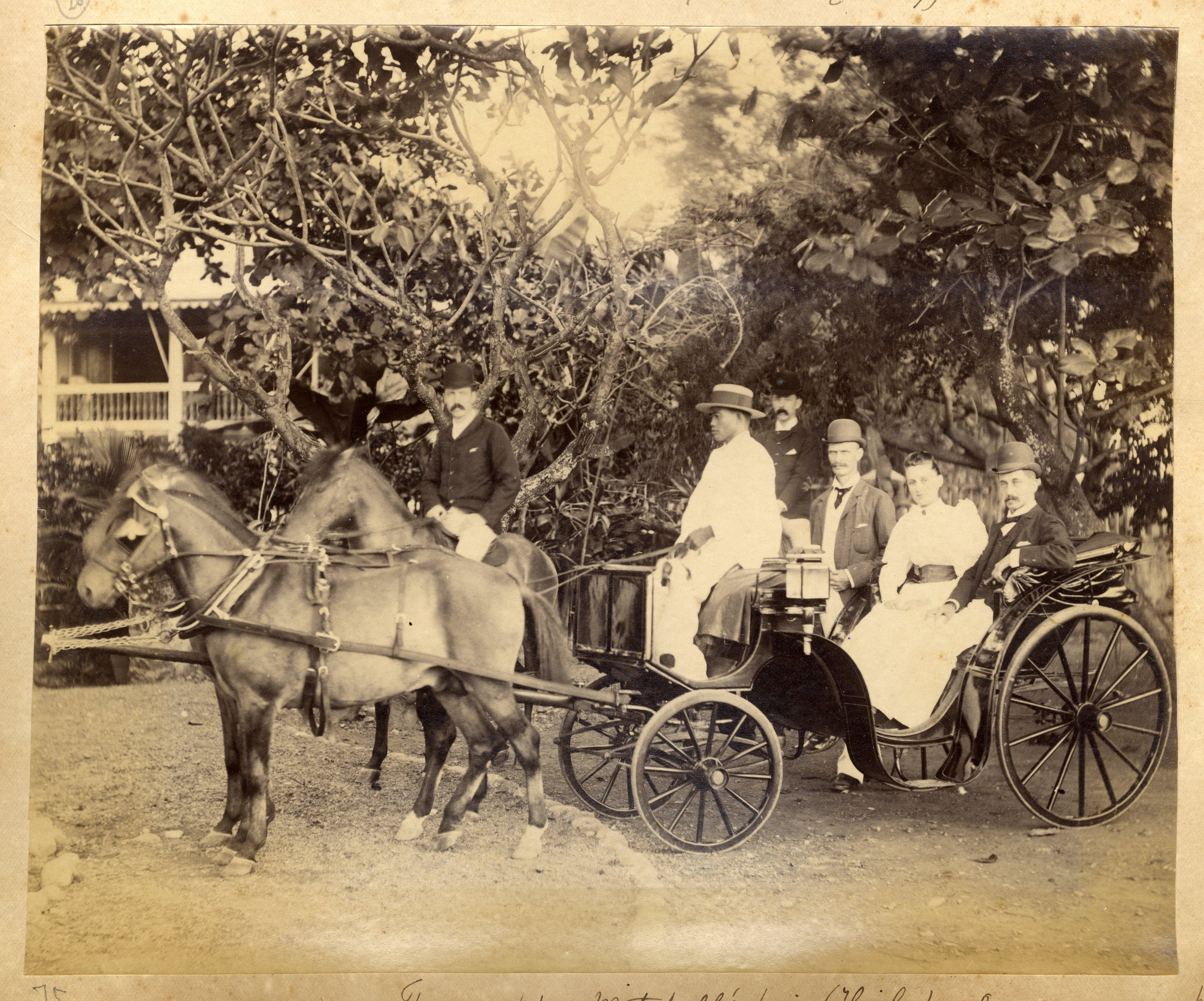
Iloilo's elite in a carriage, 1894

On October 5, 1889, a royal decree recognized Iloilo's commercial and industrial ascent by granting it city status, formalized with the establishment of the ayuntamiento in 1890 under Governor-General Valeriano Weyler. Due to the steadfast loyalty of the Ilonggos, particularly evident during conflicts with neighboring Muslim polities and later revolutionary movements, Iloilo was honored with the perpetual title of "La Muy Leal y Noble Ciudad" (Most Loyal and Noble City). The distinction, bestowed by a Royal Decree signed on March 1, 1898, by Queen Regent Maria Christina of Austria, underscored the city's favored status under Spanish rule. Over time, Iloilo became known as the 'Queen's Favored City in the South,' or simply 'Queen's City in the South,' being the second-most significant Spanish port after Manila and its southern location relative to the capital. Throughout the late colonial era, Iloilo rivaled Manila in importance, serving as a key economic and military hub.

=== Philippine revolution ===
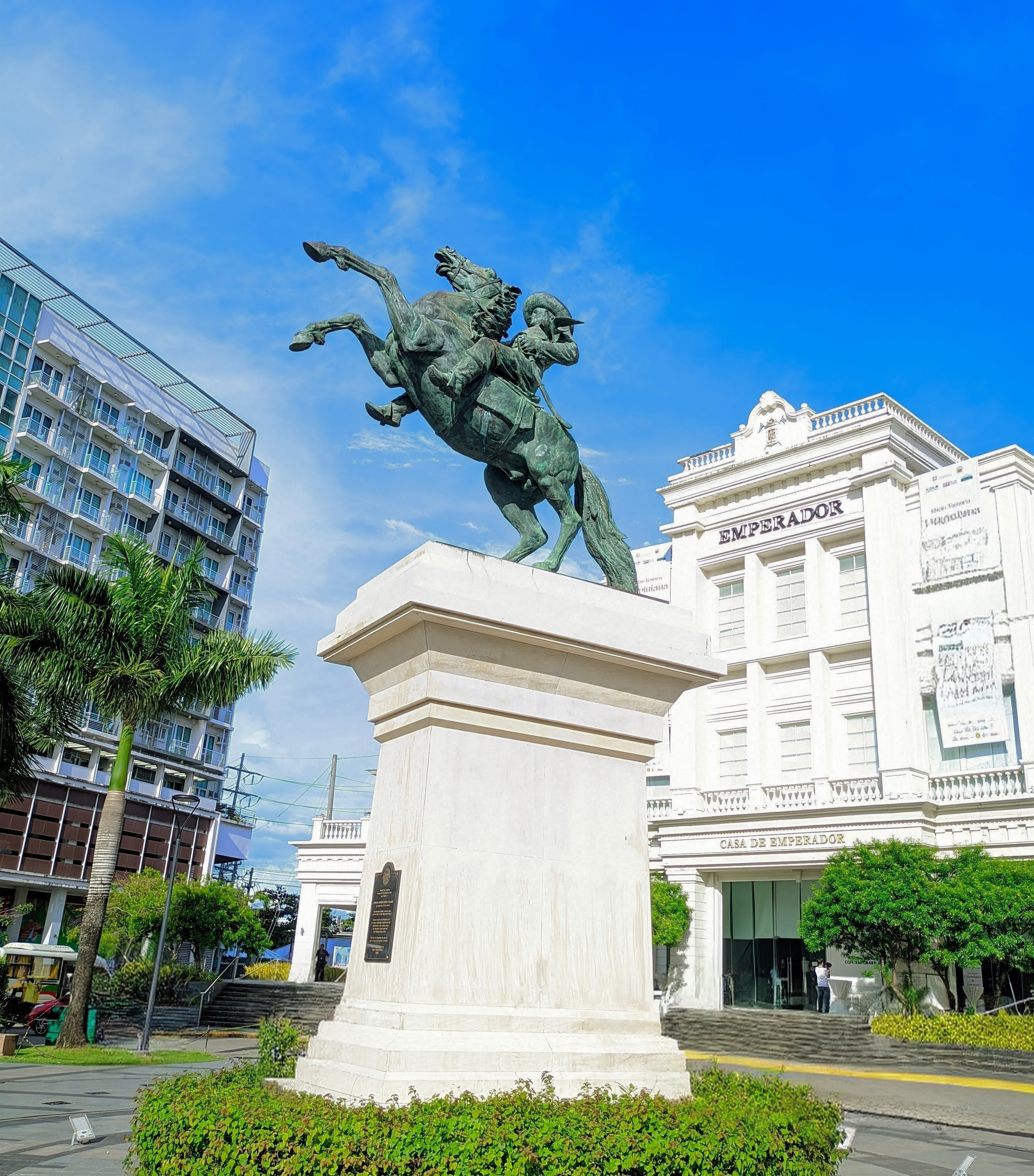
Statue of Martín Teófilo Delgado - hero of Iloilo and first governor of Iloilo province. Standing in Iloilo Business Park, Mandurriao, Iloilo City.

During the Philippine Revolution, Iloilo initially remained loyal to Spain. The city's elite organized a 500-strong battalion of native volunteers, divided into two companies under predominantly Spanish officers, which departed for Manila on January 16, 1897. The force distinguished itself in combat against Emilio Aguinaldo’s Katipunan rebels in Cavite, returning to Iloilo in April 1898 after the Pact of Biak-na-Bato amid public celebrations. Following Spain's defeat in the Spanish–American War in 1898, Iloilo briefly served as the capital of the Spanish East Indies under Governor-General Diego de los Rios.

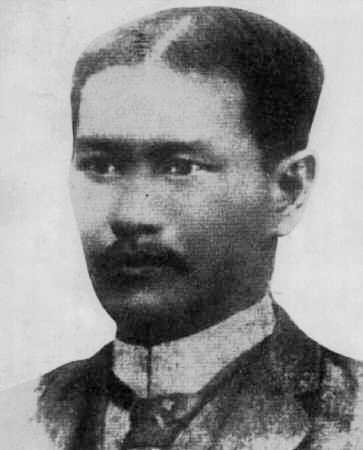
Graciano López Jaena is a notable Filipino Propagandist and National Hero born in Jaro, Iloilo City who founded the newspaper La Solidaridad. He is known for being one of the Triumvirate of Filipino Propagandists along with Marcelo H. del Pilar and José Rizal.

Graciano López-Jaena, national hero and an orator born in Jaro, Iloilo City, made his most crucial contribution to the Philippine Revolution not on the battlefield, but by founding the influential newspaper La Solidaridad in Spain, which served as the principal organ for the Propaganda Movement, uniting Filipino intellectuals and advocating for political reforms and an end to Spanish abuses in the Philippines. His contribution to Philippine history is cemented by his role as one of the Triumvirate of Filipino Propagandists, alongside José Rizal and Marcelo H. del Pilar, using his journalistic skills and essays, particularly his work Fray Botod, to awaken Filipino national consciousness and inspire the subsequent generation of revolutionaries by laying the intellectual foundation for the eventual quest for Philippine independence.

López Jaena died of tuberculosis on January 20, 1896, in Barcelona, just months before the Philippine Revolution officially began, yet his journalistic work and tireless advocacy ensured his legacy as a true pioneer of Philippine nationalism.

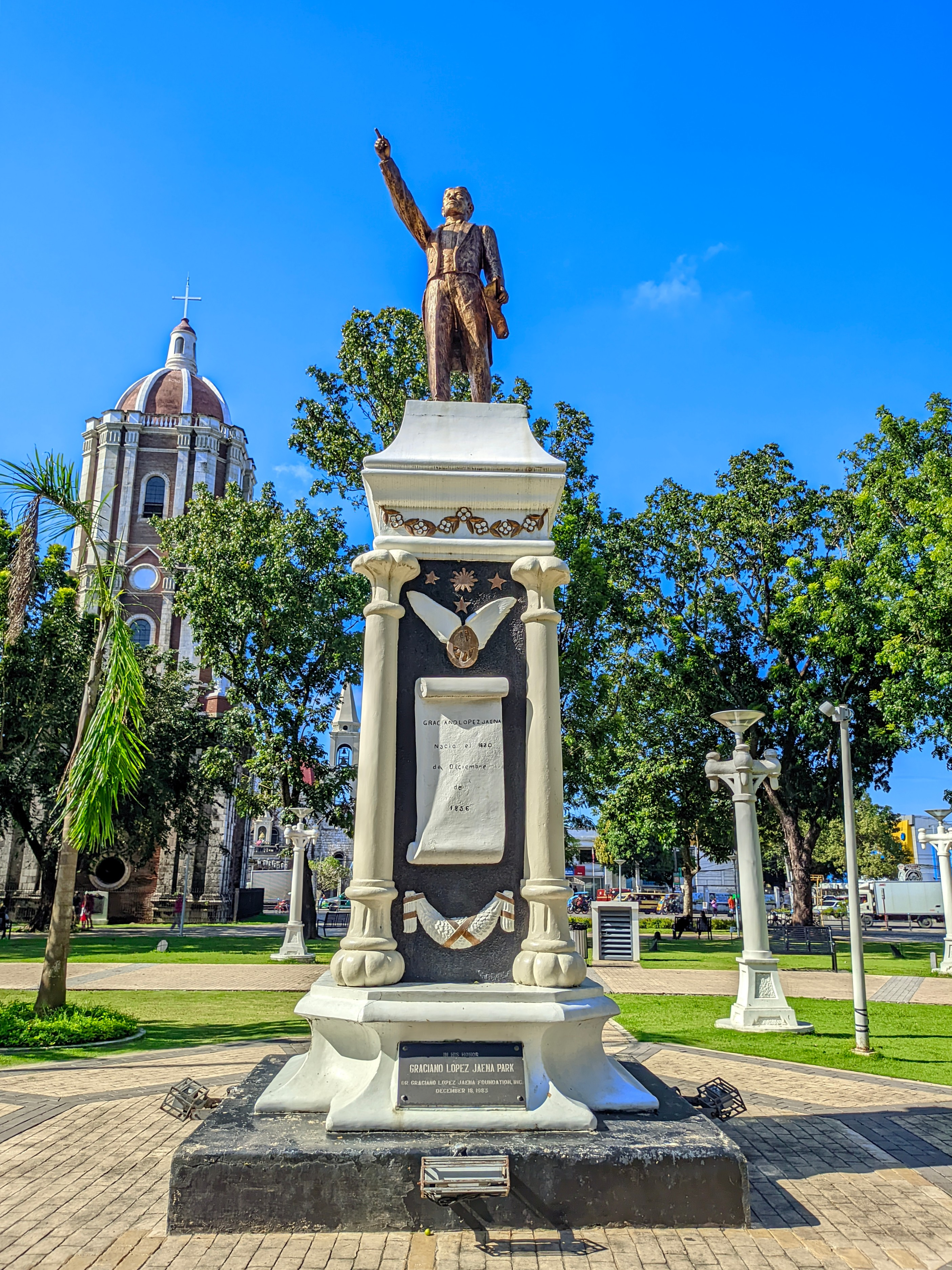
Statue of Graciano Lopez-Jaena in Plaza Jaro (Graciano Lopez-Jaena Park).

As revolutionary fervor against Spanish authority intensified across the archipelago, Emilio Aguinaldo dispatched Tagalog forces to Panay to support the burgeoning local uprising, aiming to unify the independence movement. The insurgency was effectively led by the brilliant Ilonggo general, Martín Delgado, who organized and commanded the Visayan revolutionary troops. By October 1898, Delgado's relentless campaigns had proven largely successful, securing control over the vast majority of Panay Island and confining the remaining Spanish garrisons to the core urban centers: Iloilo City, Jaro, La Paz, and Molo.

The military situation reached its climax shortly after Spain's defeat in the Spanish-American War. On December 25, 1898, Christmas Day, just fifteen days after the Treaty of Paris formally ceded the Philippines to the United States for $20 million, the final Spanish troops in the archipelago capitulated. The Spanish forces, under the command of Governor-General Diego de los Ríos, formally surrendered at the historic Plaza Alfonso XII, now known as Plaza Libertad, to General Delgado's victorious revolutionary forces. This momentous event marked the definitive collapse of Spanish sovereignty and the end of Spain's final bastion in Asia and the Pacific, concluding over 333 years of colonial rule in the Philippines. The surrender effectively transferred local authority to the newly established Federal State of the Visayas led by Delgado, although this hard-won independence was immediately threatened by the looming arrival of the American expeditionary forces.

=== American period ===
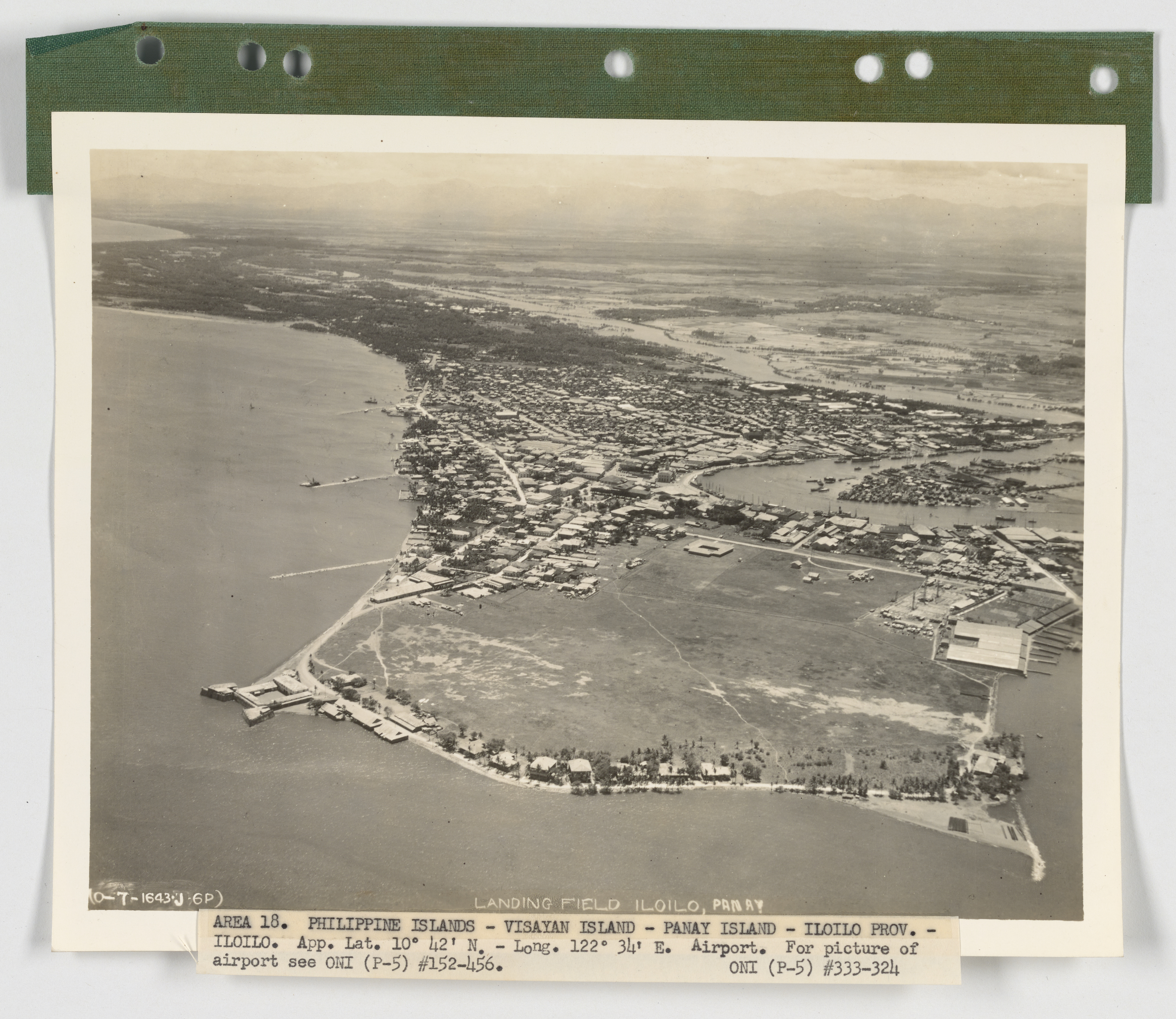
An aerial view of Iloilo, early 1900s.

Following the Spanish withdrawal, revolutionary forces entered Iloilo with fanfare, establishing a provisional government. On January 17, 1899, Raymundo Melliza, a prominent figure from Molo's elite, was elected mayor. American forces arrived in 1900, downgrading Iloilo from a city to a township amid the transition to U.S. control. In 1903, Act No. 719 reorganized the region, incorporating the municipalities of Jaro, La Paz, Mandurriao, and Molo into the jurisdiction of Iloilo. Pavia joined briefly in 1905 under Act No. 1333 but was separated in 1907 alongside Jaro, which became an independent municipality in 1908 via Executive Order No. 64. La Paz regained its autonomy in 1920 through Executive Order No. 70, signed in 1919.

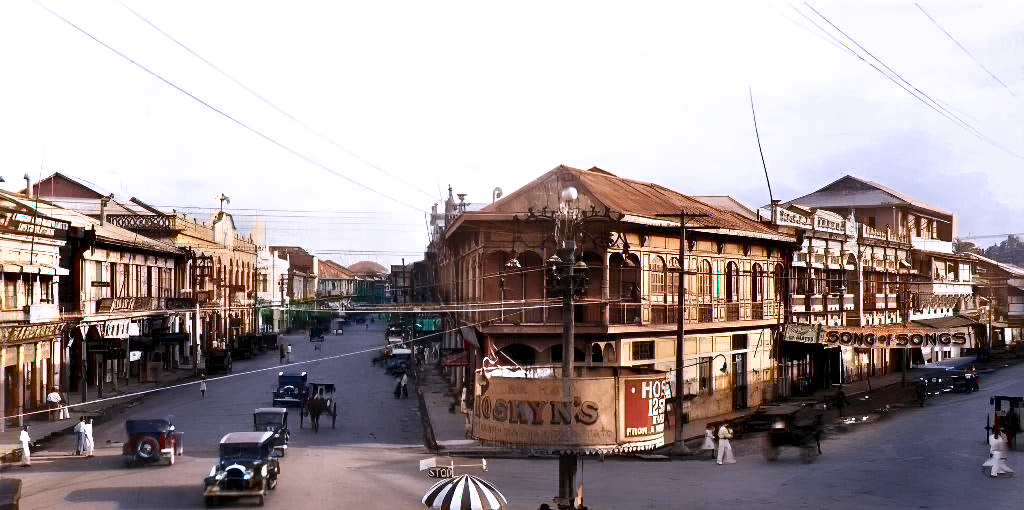
View of Calle Real (left) and Iznart Street (right) from Plazoleta Gay

American Protestant missionaries established some of the earliest Protestant institutions in the Philippines in Iloilo, including Jaro Evangelical Church (the first Baptist church in the country), Iloilo Mission Hospital (the first American and Protestant hospital in the country), and Central Philippine University (the first Baptist and second American and Protestant university in the country). Other early infrastructure projects by the American administration included the construction of Baluarte and Arroyo streets, the extension of Delgado Street to Valeria, and the development of Fuentes and Jalandoni streets, reaching what is now the University of the Philippines Visayas campus. Quezon and Mabini streets were paved and lined with sidewalks, and by 1921 the city was illuminated with streetlights. In 1926, authorities began widening key thoroughfares such as General Luna, J.M. Basa, and Ledesma. In 1927, the improved Valeria-Ledesma street, formerly Weyler, was inaugurated.

Commonwealth Act No. 57, enacted on October 20, 1936, established the initial charter for the City of Iloilo, merging the municipality of Iloilo with the town of La Paz. This framework was swiftly amended less than a month later by Commonwealth Act No. 158 on November 9, 1936, which expanded the city limits to annex the neighboring municipalities of Molo, Mandurriao, and Arevalo. The consolidation legally took effect on July 16, 1937, and the unified chartered city was formally inaugurated on August 25, 1937, with President Manuel L. Quezon declaring the date a celebration. Jaro's incorporation into the city followed later in 1941 under Commonwealth Act No. 604, with President Quezon issuing Proclamation No. 663 on January 7, 1941, setting January 16 of that year as the effective date.

Gallery of Iloilo City during the American period

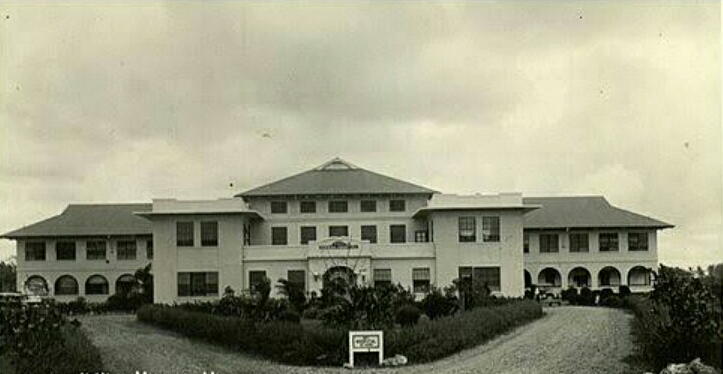
Iloilo Mission Hospital in 1930s. Founded in 1901, it is the first American and Protestant hospital in the Philippines.

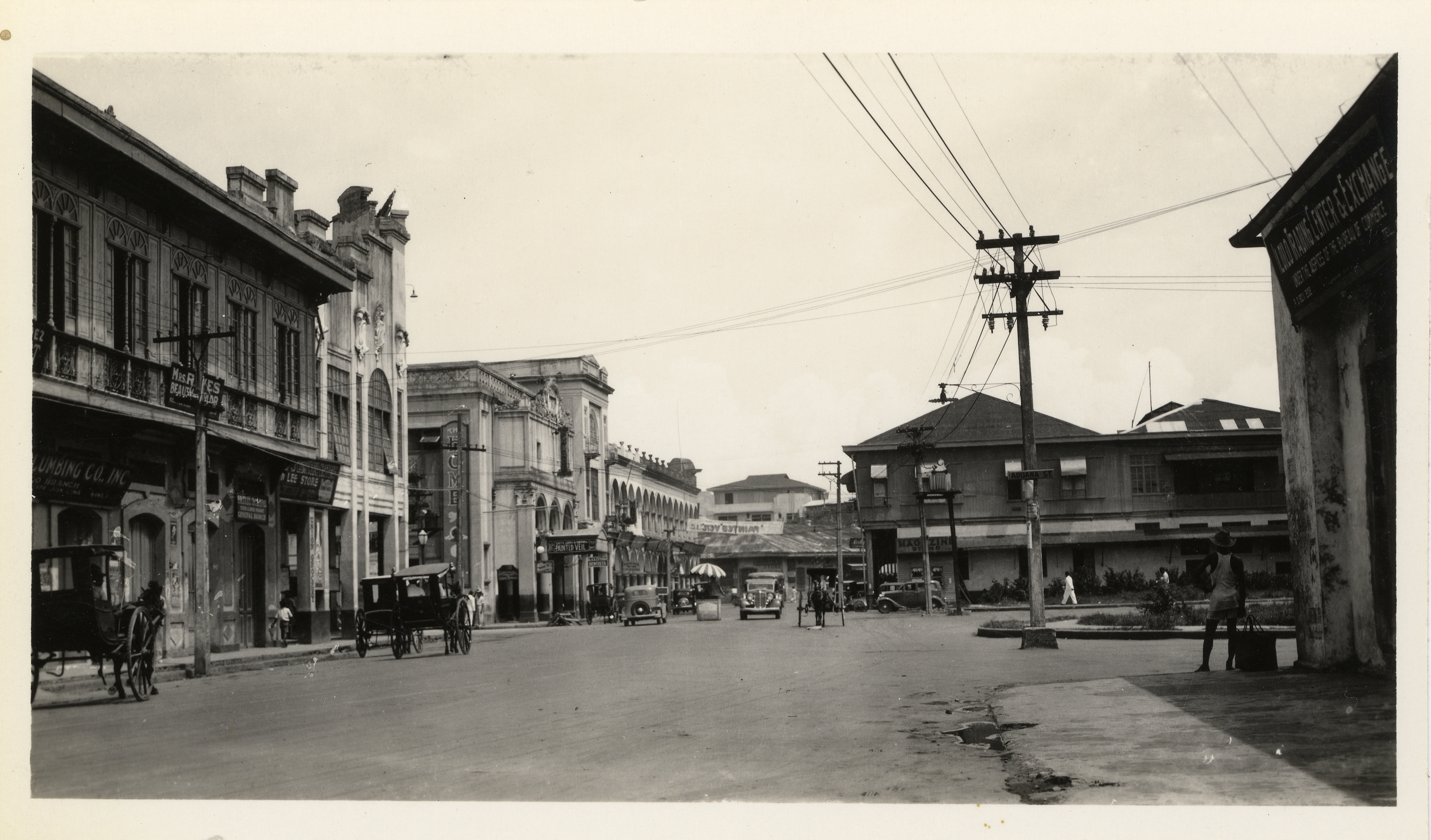
J.M. Basa Street, widely known as Calle Real, in the 1920s.

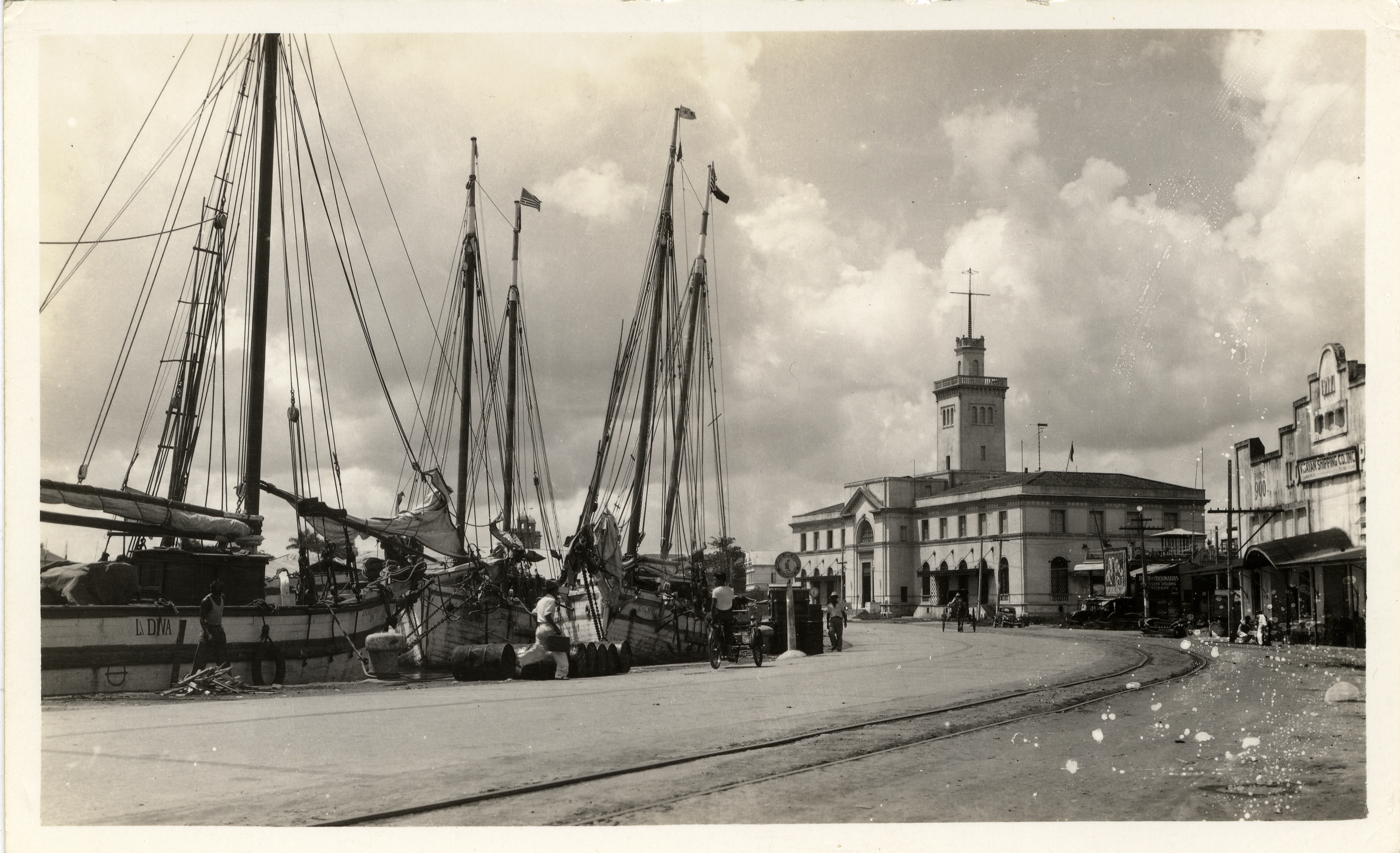
Sailing ships at the Muelle Loney wharf, circa 1920s to 1930s.

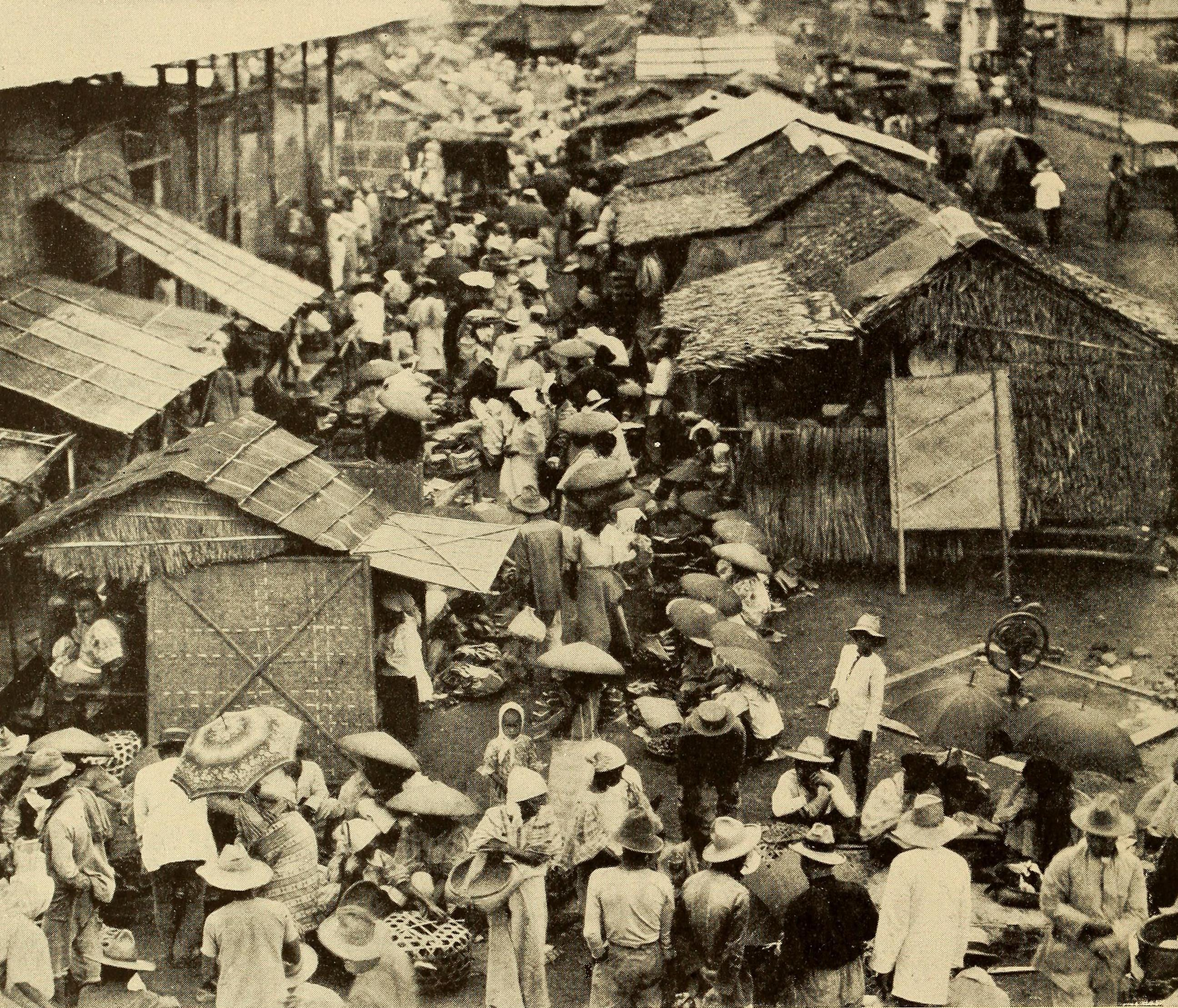
A market in Iloilo, in the 1910s.

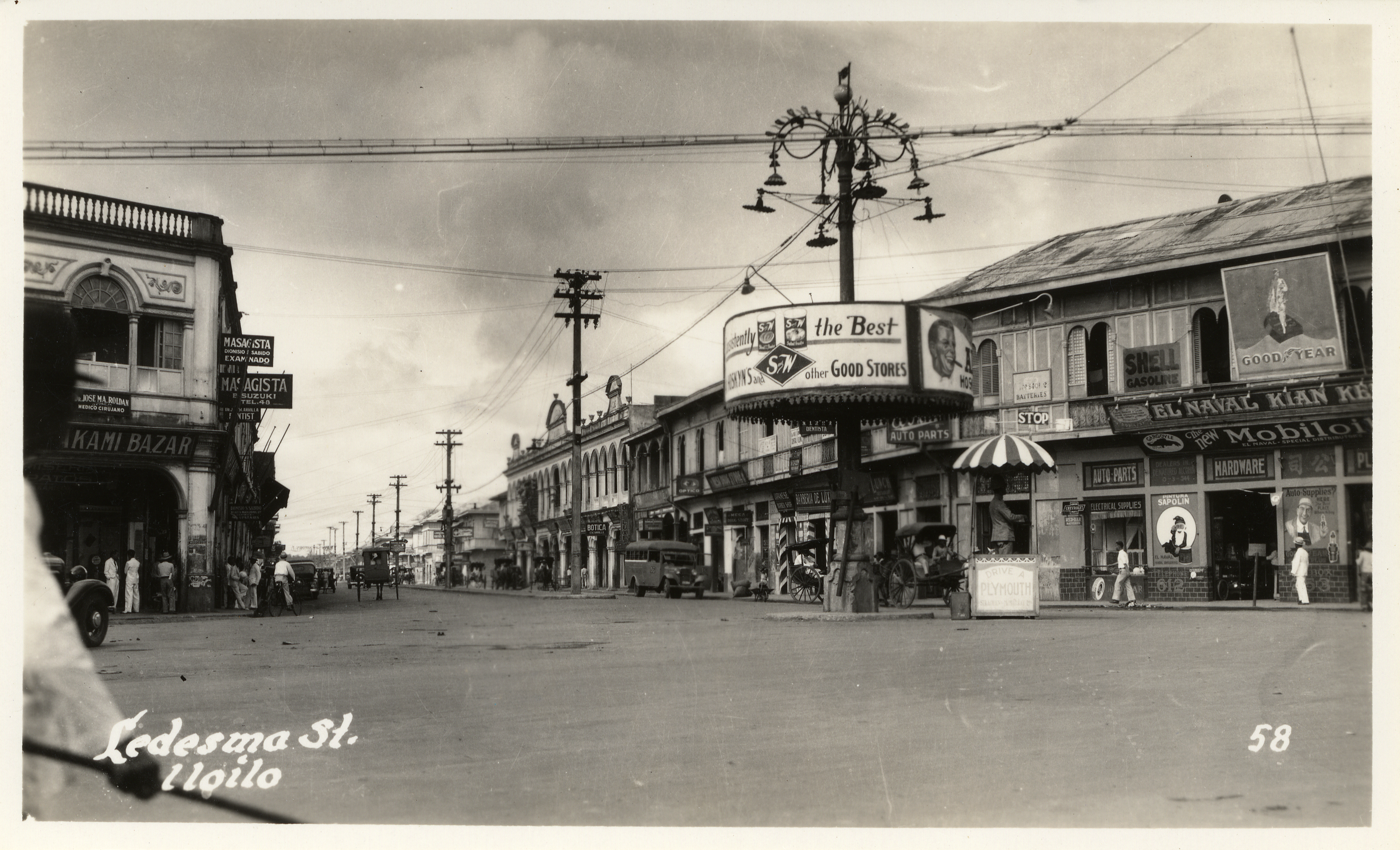
View of Ledesma Street from Plazoleta Gay, a road junction, in the 1920s.

=== Japanese occupation period ===
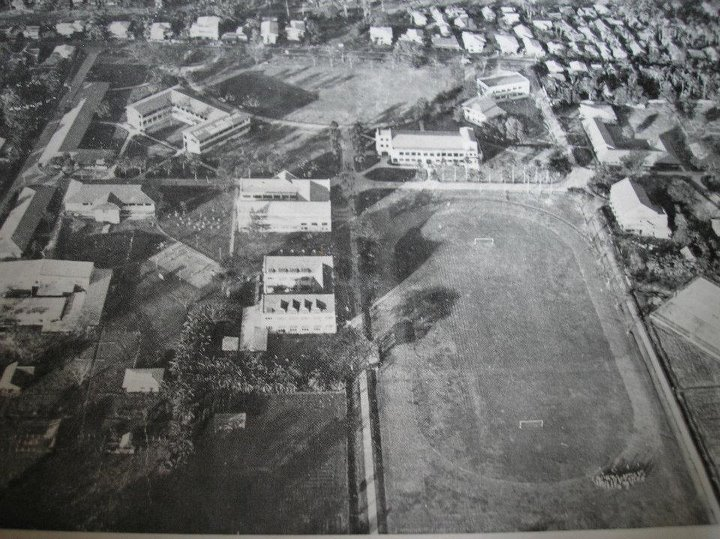
Central Philippine University’s main campus suffered extensive destruction during World War II.

By 1942, the Japanese had invaded Panay, and the economy came to a standstill. During World War II, Iloilo was controlled by several Japanese battalions. Japan's ultimate goal was to entrench itself deeply in the Philippines so that, at the close of the war, it could occupy the country just as the Spanish and the Americans had years before. The Japanese built "comfort stations" in Iloilo in 1942, where they imprisoned Filipino "comfort women" who were routinely gang-raped, brutalized, and murdered for entertainment.

Nevertheless, during the Japanese occupation, Macario Peralta Jr. freed most of Panay (with few exceptions) from Japanese imperialism. As a result, allied guerrillas from other provinces, including Romblon, Palawan, Marinduque, and portions of Masbate and Mindoro, considered Panay, the "Primus inter pares" in their alliance network.

When Iloilo was liberated by Filipino and American forces from Japanese military occupation on March 25, 1945, the remnants of these battalions were held in Jaro Plaza, which was used as a makeshift detention facility.

=== Post-war and independence era ===
The aftermath of World War II left Iloilo's infrastructure heavily damaged. The situation worsened in 1966 when a massive fire destroyed nearly three-quarters of the city's downtown area, further crippling its economy. Compounding these challenges were ongoing conflicts between labor unions in the port area, the decline of the sugar industry, and a deteriorating peace and order situation in the countryside. These factors prompted many Ilonggos to seek better opportunities elsewhere, leading to a significant exodus to cities like Bacolod, Cebu, and Manila. The migration contributed to Iloilo's decline as a central economic hub in the Philippines. While rural agricultural areas continued to support the local economy, the loss of investors and skilled workers slowed Iloilo's progress. For years, the city's economy grew at a moderate pace, struggling to regain its former prominence.

Change came slowly. The construction of a fishing port and a new international sea port marked the beginning of Iloilo's recovery. These infrastructure projects attracted commercial business firms, which began investing in the city one by one. The gradual influx of investment spurred Iloilo's eventual economic revival, setting the stage for its resurgence as a key player in the region. Iloilo became a highly urbanized city on December 22, 1979, by virtue of Batas Pambansa Blg. 51. As a result of the new status, its residents effectively lost their eligibility to vote for provincial officials.

=== Martial law era ===
The late 1960s marked the beginning of a period of unrest in the Philippines, driven by the economic fallout from Ferdinand Marcos’ debt-driven projects. The projects, aimed at securing his re-election in 1969, led to a balance of payments crisis and soaring inflation. By the time of his second inauguration on December 30, 1969, the peso had begun to crash, sparking widespread social unrest. While major protests erupted in Manila, Iloilo City also became a center of resistance. Students from Central Philippine University and the nearby Western Institute of Technology in La Paz played a pivotal role in organizing the protests. They formed the Federation of Ilonggo Students (FIST), with leaders like Vic Beloria, Renato Ganchero, Virgil Ortigas, and the brothers Napoleon and Rolando Lorca. These activists would later be forced into hiding after Marcos declared martial law in 1972. Many of them lost their lives resisting the dictatorship and were honored as martyrs, with their names inscribed on the Bantayog ng mga Bayani (Heroes’ Memorial). Another prominent student activist, Edmundo Legislador of the University of the Philippines Iloilo, was similarly honored for his role in the resistance.

The declaration of martial law in 1972 marked the beginning of a 14-year period of authoritarian rule characterized by widespread human rights abuses. According to documentation by Amnesty International and Task Force Detainees of the Philippines, the Marcos regime was responsible for 3,257 extrajudicial killings, 35,000 cases of torture, and 70,000 incarcerations. Iloilo was not spared from the repression, as it became home to one of the key detention centers for political prisoners, the Camp Delgado.

Among the prominent figures detained at Camp Delgado was Rodolfo Lagoc, a labor lawyer who was held without charges for six months. Another detainee was Coronacion “Walingwaling” Chiva, a World War II heroine whose legendary status largely protected her from harm during her detention. Other activists, such as Luing Posa-Dominado and Judy Taguiwalo, were subjected to torture, manhandling, and sexual assault. For their bravery and sacrifices, Lagoc, Chiva, and Posa-Dominado were later honored on the Wall of Remembrance at the Bantayog ng mga Bayani. Taguiwalo, who survived the ordeal, went on to serve as Secretary of the Department of Social Welfare and Development.

=== Late 20th and early 21st centuries ===
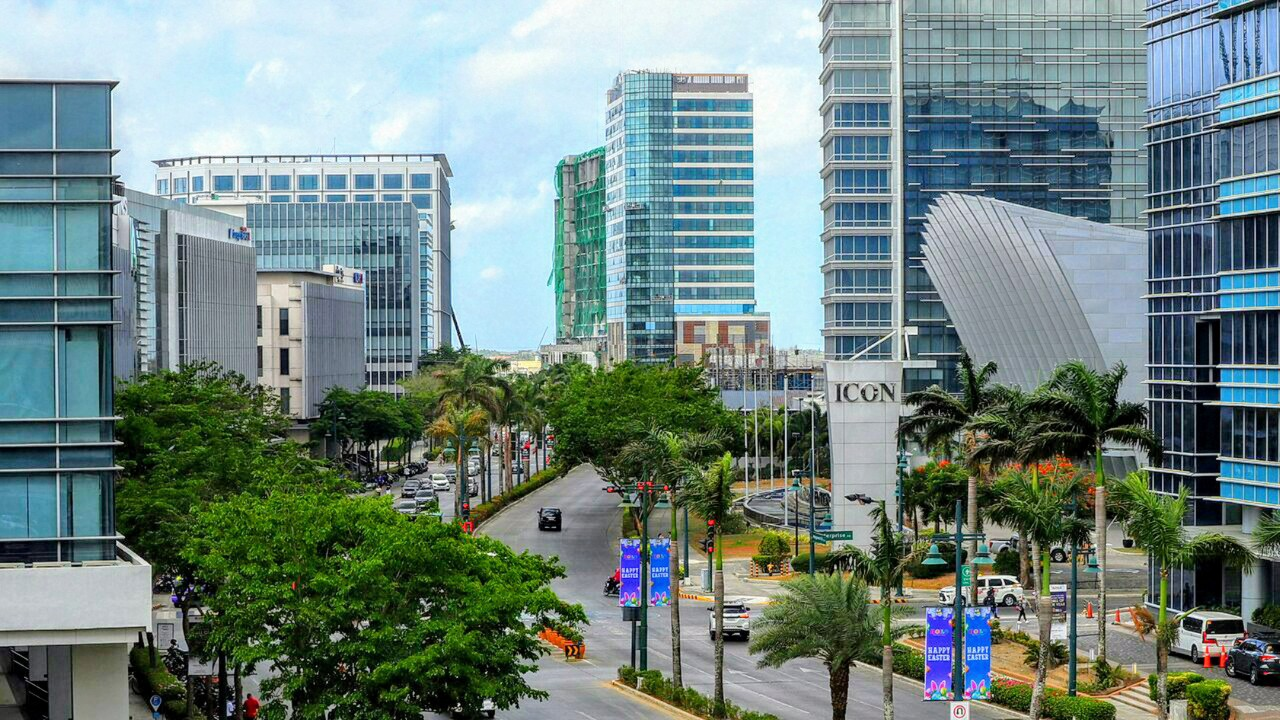
Iloilo Business Park, on the site of the former airport, is a major new central business district.

At the turn of the 21st century, Iloilo experienced a significant economic boom, driven by major infrastructure projects and investments. The acquisition of the old Iloilo Airport in Mandurriao district and the construction of the Iloilo Diversion Road spurred urban development, attracting major businesses and real estate developers to the area. The investments transformed Iloilo into one of the fastest-growing economies in the Philippines.

In 2008, Lapuz gained its district status after separating from La Paz as a sub-district, making it the seventh district of Iloilo City. The resolution was passed to enable Lapuz to have its own dedicated police station and fire station.

The city government in 2010, began the Iloilo River Cleanup and Rehabilitation as part its initiative to restore the ecological balance and improve the livability of Iloilo City. Led by then Mayor Jed Patrick E. Mabilog, the project involved the relocation of informal settlers, strict enforcement of environmental laws, mangrove reforestation, and the establishment of the Iloilo River Esplanade, a scenic linear park that became a symbol of the city's transformation. The rehabilitation significantly improved water quality, revived marine biodiversity, and reduced flooding in surrounding communities. The initiative gained both national and international recognition, earning awards such as the ASEAN Environmentally Sustainable City Award (2015) and the LivCom Award from the International Awards for Livable Communities, cementing Iloilo City's reputation as one of the Philippines’ cleanest and most livable urban centers.

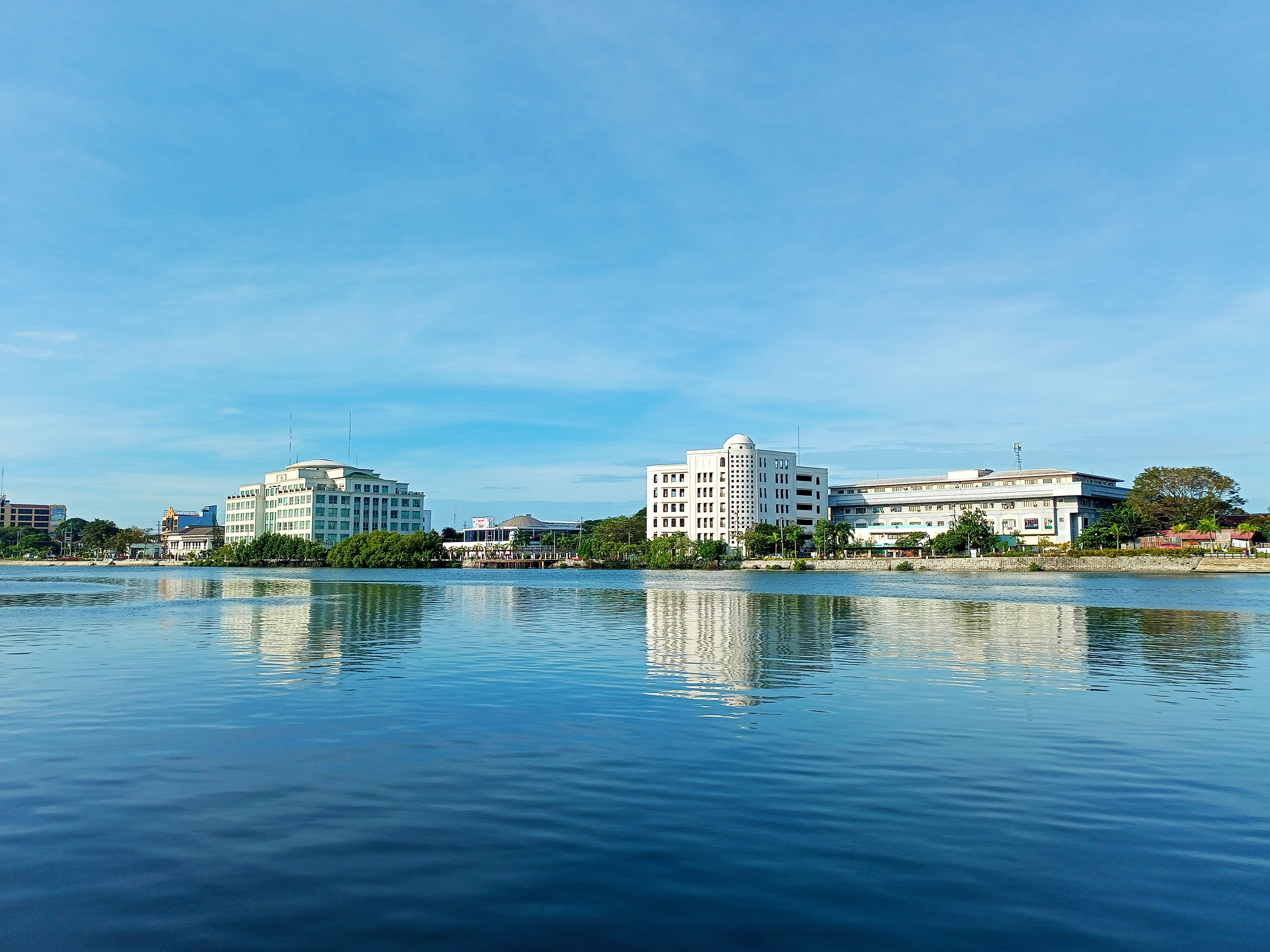
Iloilo River was revitalized by the local government in 2010.

The city's power distribution system underwent a major change in 2019. MORE Electric and Power Corporation (MORE Power), owned by Spanish-Filipino billionaire Enrique K. Razon, took over operations from the long-standing Panay Electric Company (PECO). MORE Power introduced modern power services, including the installation of an underground cabling system, starting with Calle Real in downtown Iloilo City.

In 2021–2023, the city underwent a rehabilitation and beautification works for its public squares — Jaro Plaza, Plaza Libertad, La Paz Plaza, Mandurriao Plaza, Arevalo Plaza, and Molo Plaza; restoration of heritage structures like Jaro Belfry; renovation of districts public markets; and upgrading of Iloilo Central Market and Iloilo Terminal Market into market malls through public-private partnership with SM Prime Holdings.

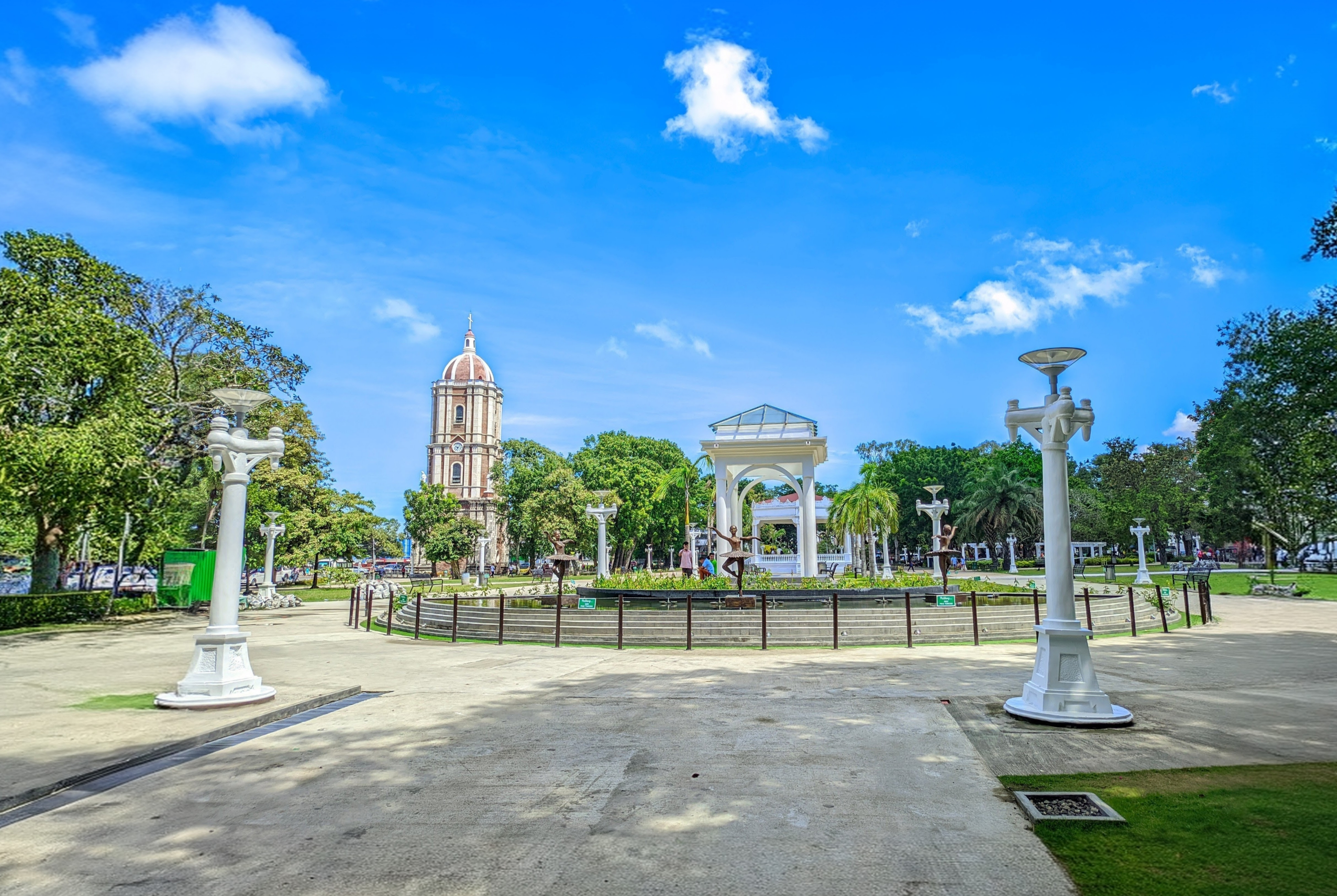
Jaro Plaza after its major rehabilitation, with the restored Jaro Belfry in the background.

In 2023, Iloilo City was recognized as the Philippines' first UNESCO Creative of Gastronomy. In 2024, the Calle Real Heritage Zone collectively under "The Sugar Cultural Landscape of Negros and Panay Islands", has been included in the UNESCO World Heritage Site Tentative List. In the same year on May 8, 2024, the Hinilawod Epic Chant Recordings housed at the Henry Luce III Library of Central Philippine University has been inscribed in the UNESCO Memory of the World Register, which marked Iloilo City's 2nd UNESCO inscription after the UNESCO Creative of Gastronomy.

In 2024, the Iloilo Commercial Port Complex was granted to International Container Terminal Services, Inc. (ICTSI) for development and management. Renamed the Visayas Container Terminal, the project aimed to modernize the facility and expand its international connectivity, further enhance trade and economic growth in the central Philippines.

In the same year, international air routes from Iloilo International Airport to Hong Kong and Singapore were re-opened, followed by the launching of Bangkok-Don Mueang route, this resulted for Iloilo opening to the global trade, commerce, and tourism.

== Geography ==
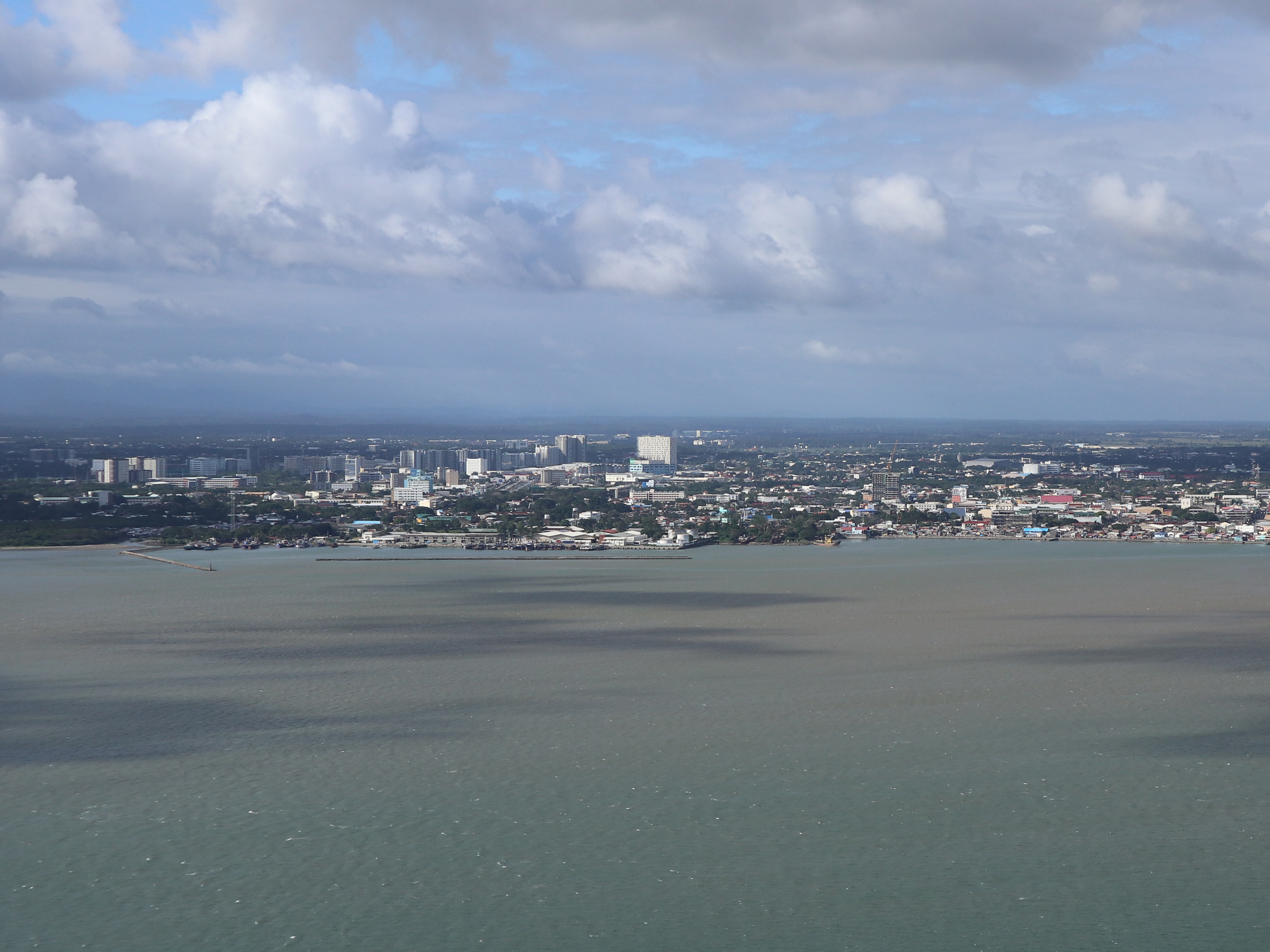
An aerial view of Iloilo City from Balaan Bukid in Guimaras, across the Iloilo Strait.

Iloilo City is situated on the southern shores of Panay, facing the Iloilo Strait and Guimaras to its south and east. The location forms a natural harbor and a safe anchorage for ships. The city is bordered by the municipality of Oton to the west, Pavia to the north, and Leganes to the northeast. Across the Iloilo Strait, along its eastern and southern coastlines, lie the towns of Buenavista and Jordan in the island-province of Guimaras.

The city occupies a flat alluvial plain, largely reclaimed from swampy areas due to urbanization and industrialization from the late 19th century to the present. Several rivers traverse the city, including the Iloilo, Batiano, Jaro, and Dungon Creek. The Iloilo River, an estuary, separates the districts of City Proper, Molo, and Arevalo from the rest of the city. The Jaro River is fed by its tributaries, the Aganan and Tigum rivers.

The Jaro Floodway was developed as a new escape channel to divert floodwaters from these two rivers into the Iloilo Strait. Iloilo City lies 337.6 nautical miles (630 km) from Manila, 116 kilometres (72 mi) from Roxas City, 158 kilometres (98 mi) from Kalibo, and 97 kilometres (60 mi) from San Jose de Buenavista. It spans a total land area of 70.3 square kilometres (27.1 sq mi).

The city is divided into seven geographical districts: the City Proper, Jaro, Molo, Mandurriao, La Paz, Arevalo, and Lapuz. All districts, except Lapuz, were once independent towns; Lapuz was a sub-district of La Paz until it gained separate status in 2008. (Note: In 1903, the municipalities of Jaro, La Paz, Mandurriao, and Molo, were incorporated into the municipality of Iloilo. Pavia was also incorporated into Iloilo from Santa Barbara in 1905. In 1908, Pavia and Jaro were separated from Iloilo and constituted as the municipality of Jaro. La Paz was re-established as a separate municipality in 1920. In 1937, the town of Iloilo was amalgamated with the towns of La Paz and Arévalo as one chartered city. The municipality of Jaro, on the other hand, was re-incorporated into Iloilo City in 1941.) Each district features its own town center, equipped with a plaza, a Roman Catholic church, a fire station, a police station, and a public market. City Proper serves as the commercial hub and the political center of both the city and Iloilo province, and the regional government center of Western Visayas.

Iloilo City anchors the only officially recognized metropolitan area in Western Visayas. (Note: Presidential Executive Order No. 559 of President Gloria Macapagal Arroyo signed on August 28, 2006) The metropolitan area encompasses Iloilo City and the surrounding municipalities of Leganes, Pavia, Santa Barbara, Cabatuan, San Miguel, and Oton, along with the island-province of Guimaras and its five municipalities: Sibunag, San Lorenzo, Nueva Valencia, Buenavista, and Jordan.

=== Barangays and districts ===
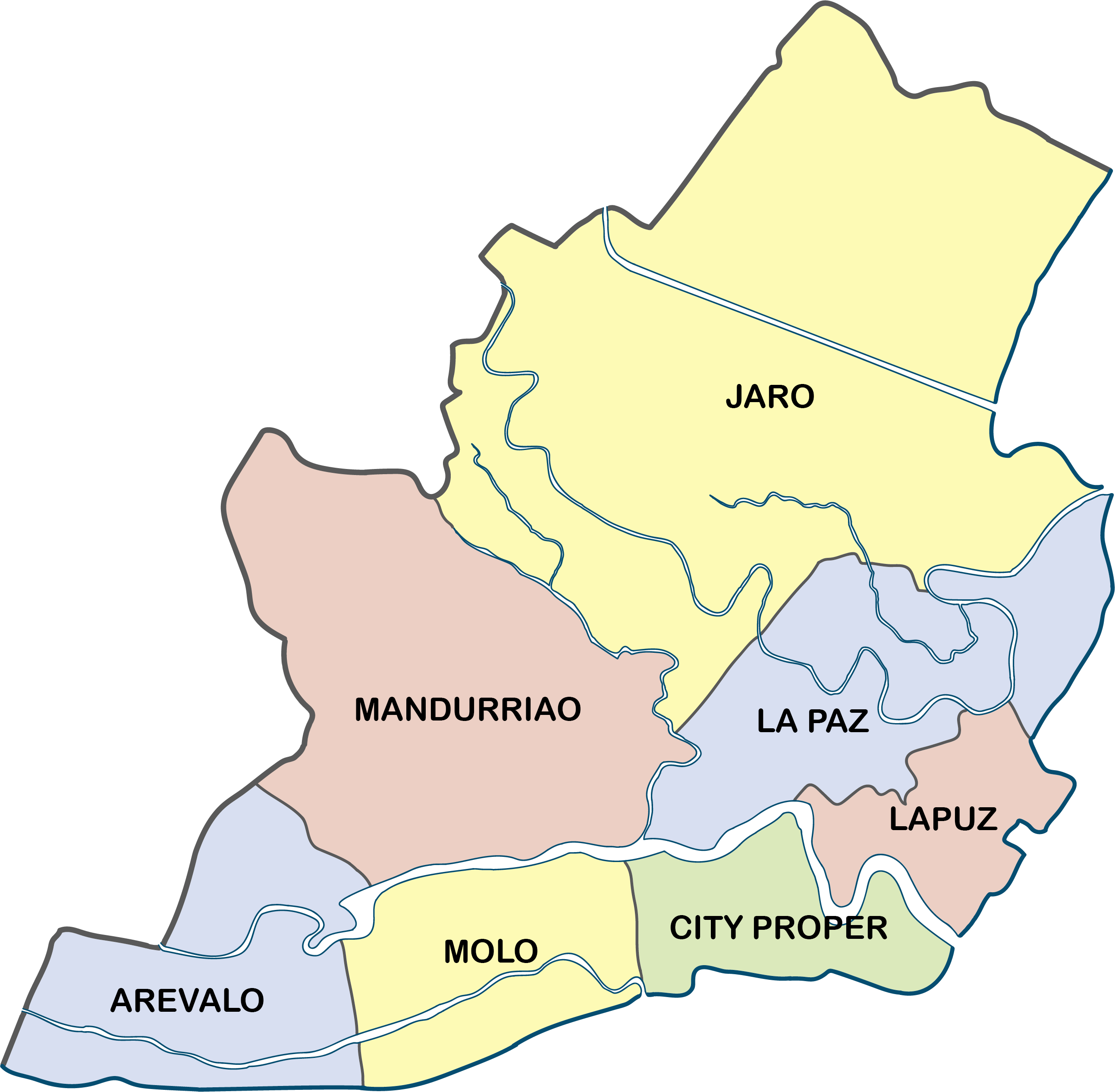
A map of Iloilo City's seven districts.

Iloilo City constitutes one at-large congressional district. It is divided into seven administrative districts, each of which is subdivided into barangays. There are 180 barangays across the city.

District	Area		Population (2024)	Density		Barangays	Location
	km^{2}	sq mi		/km^{2}	/sq mi		Location
Arevalo	7.58	2.93	57,265	7,600	20,000	13 [list]	
City Proper	3.73	1.44	47,231	13,000	34,000	45 [list]	
Jaro	27.48	10.61	136,274	5,000	13,000	42 [list]	
La Paz	11.33	4.37	58,098	5,100	13,000	25 [list]	
Lapuz	3.25	1.25	31,603	9,700	25,000	12 [list]	
Mandurriao	13.78	5.32	66,464	4,800	12,000	18 [list]	
Molo	5.54	2.14	76,793	14,000	36,000	25 [list]	

=== Climate ===
Iloilo City has a tropical wet and dry climate within the Köppen climate classification system. The wet season is from June to November. The dry season is from December to May.

Climate data for Iloilo, Philippines (1961–1990, extremes 1903–2012)
Month	Jan	Feb	Mar	Apr	May	Jun	Jul	Aug	Sep	Oct	Nov	Dec	Year
Record high °C (°F)	34.7 (94.5)	35.5 (95.9)	39.0 (102.2)	37.5 (99.5)	37.8 (100.0)	37.5 (99.5)	35.2 (95.4)	34.8 (94.6)	37.8 (100.0)	35.4 (95.7)	34.8 (94.6)	34.5 (94.1)	39.0 (102.2)
Mean daily maximum °C (°F)	29.7 (85.5)	30.2 (86.4)	31.7 (89.1)	33.1 (91.6)	33.1 (91.6)	31.6 (88.9)	30.7 (87.3)	30.4 (86.7)	30.8 (87.4)	31.1 (88.0)	30.9 (87.6)	30.2 (86.4)	31.1 (88.0)
Daily mean °C (°F)	26.1 (79.0)	26.5 (79.7)	27.6 (81.7)	28.9 (84.0)	29.1 (84.4)	28.1 (82.6)	27.6 (81.7)	27.5 (81.5)	27.6 (81.7)	27.7 (81.9)	27.5 (81.5)	26.8 (80.2)	27.6 (81.7)
Mean daily minimum °C (°F)	22.7 (72.9)	22.7 (72.9)	23.5 (74.3)	24.6 (76.3)	25.1 (77.2)	24.7 (76.5)	24.4 (75.9)	24.5 (76.1)	24.4 (75.9)	24.2 (75.6)	24.0 (75.2)	23.4 (74.1)	24.0 (75.2)
Record low °C (°F)	16.5 (61.7)	16.7 (62.1)	18.6 (65.5)	20.0 (68.0)	20.2 (68.4)	21.0 (69.8)	19.5 (67.1)	20.0 (68.0)	19.8 (67.6)	19.2 (66.6)	19.4 (66.9)	18.3 (64.9)	16.5 (61.7)
Average rainfall mm (inches)	39.9 (1.57)	19.1 (0.75)	27.1 (1.07)	47.7 (1.88)	117.9 (4.64)	255.2 (10.05)	313.2 (12.33)	363.7 (14.32)	266.8 (10.50)	264.1 (10.40)	174.8 (6.88)	64.2 (2.53)	1,953.7 (76.92)
Average rainy days (≥ 0.1 mm)	11	7	7	6	14	18	21	20	19	18	15	14	170
Average relative humidity (%)	82	80	75	73	77	82	85	85	85	84	84	83	81
Source 1: Climate Charts
Source 2: Deutscher Wetterdienst (rainy days), PAGASA (records)

== Cityscape ==
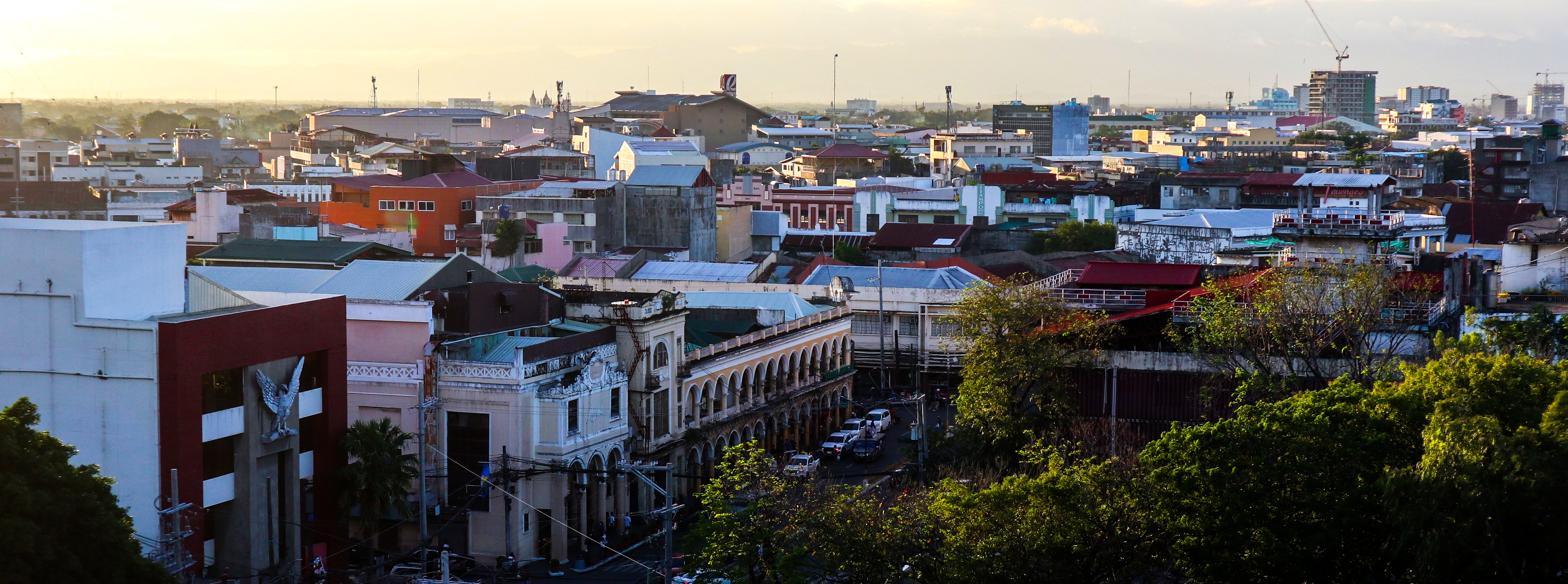
Heritage cityscape in Downtown Iloilo

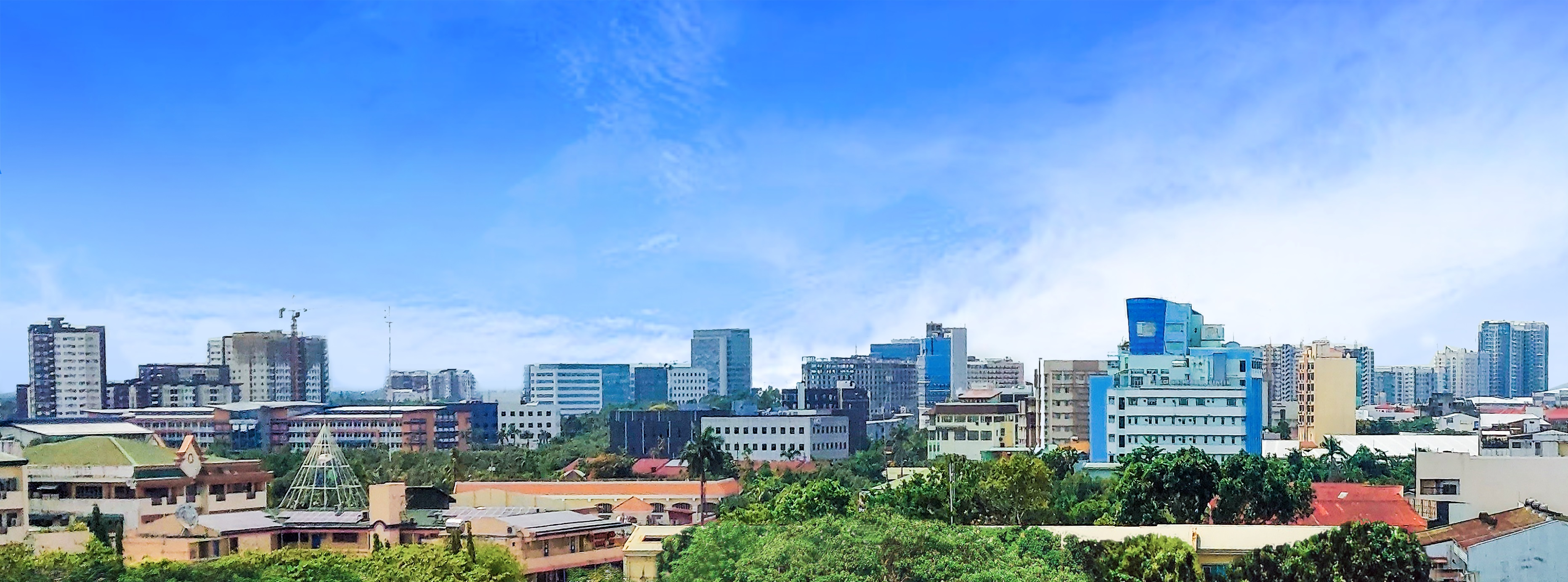
Modern cityscape in Mandurriao district

Iloilo City's geographical and architectural features have significantly influenced its centuries-long role as a trading hub, blending colonial heritage with modern development. Situated on a plain along the southeastern coast of Panay, the city is bordered by the Iloilo Strait and the island of Guimaras, which together form a natural harbor. The Iloilo and Batiano rivers flow through its districts, eventually emptying into the strait, while bicycle paths, ornamental trees, parks, gardens, and open spaces contribute to its well-planned urban landscape. The city is a conglomerate of former towns, including the once-independent city of Jaro, with each district maintaining its distinct character. Civic centers in each district often feature Spanish colonial layouts, characterized by plazas, churches, and municipal halls. Modern developments are strategically concentrated in Mandurriao, ensuring the preservation of the city's skyline, heritage zones, and environment, while also extending into neighboring towns within its metropolitan area.

=== Architecture ===
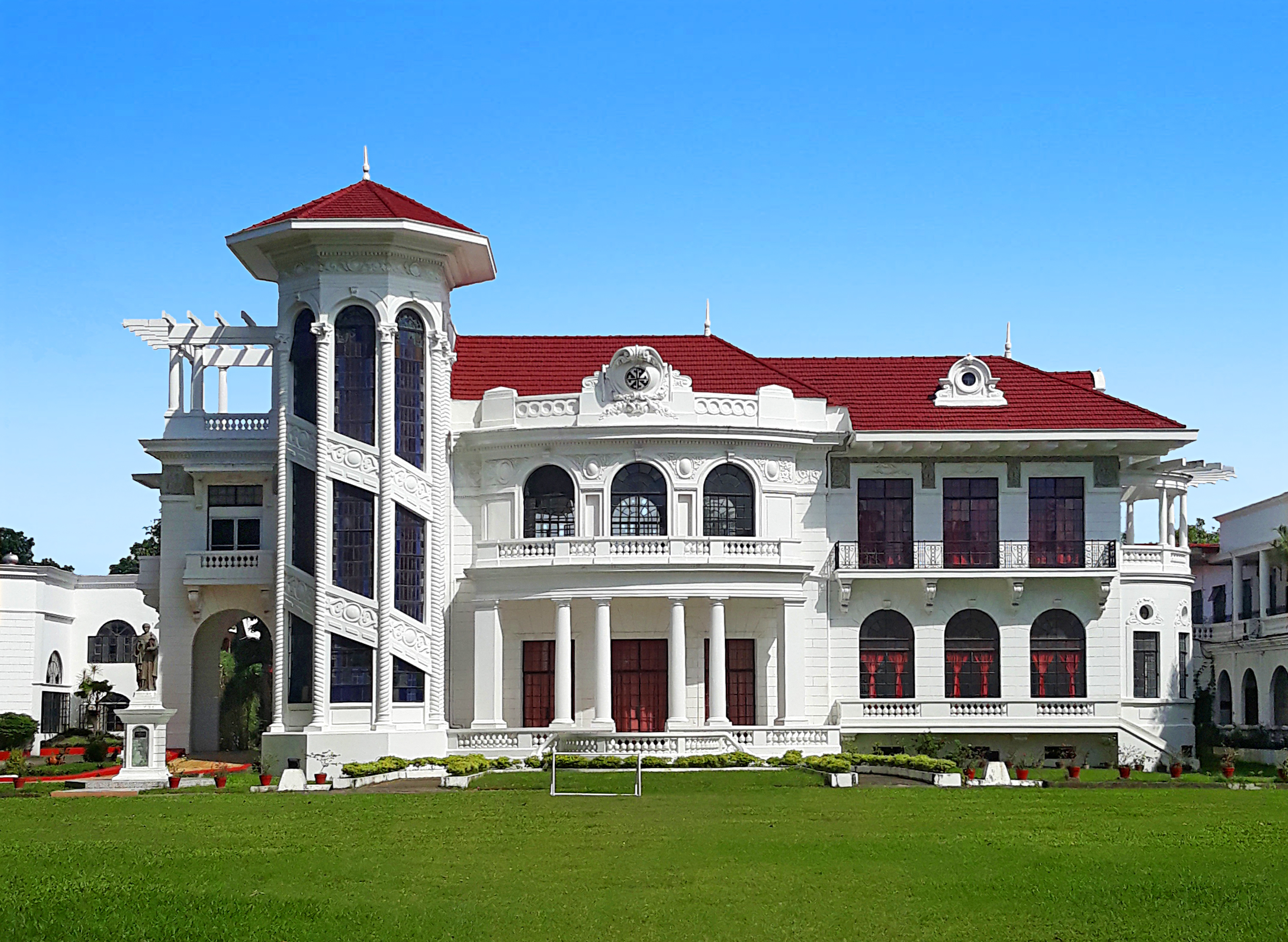
The 1937 Beaux-Arts Lizares Mansion, designed by Filipino architect Andrés Luna de San Pedro

Iloilo City's architecture reflects a profound combination of Spanish and American colonial influences, layered over indigenous foundations, creating a rich historical urban landscape. In 1930, architect Juan Arellano created a schematic plan for the city based on Ebenezer Howard’s "Garden City" concept, shaping the city’s layout as an amalgamation of former towns, each centered around plazas surrounded by churches and administrative halls.

During the Spanish colonial period, the sugar industry boom led to the construction of over 240 ancestral homes, 30 of which are considered grand mansions built by elite Ilonggo families. Iloilo has the most restored heritage buildings outside Metro Manila and is often referred to as the "City of Mansions."

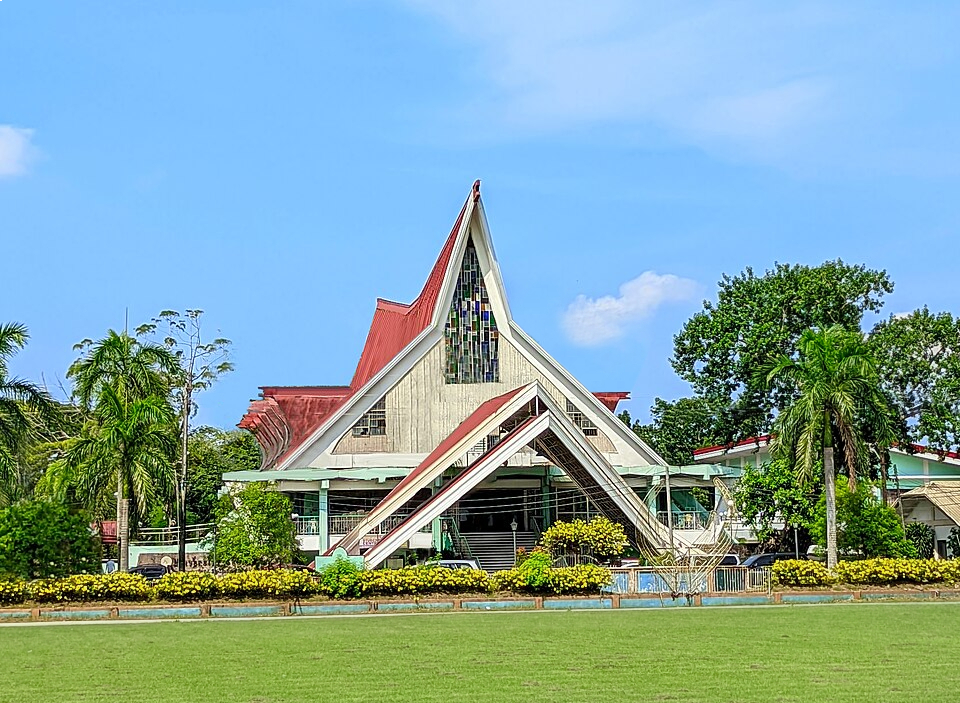
The Central Philippine University Church is noted for its Malay motif design, while the CPU main campus, designated a Registered Cultural Property of the Philippines, features American colonial-era structures listed in the Philippine Registry of Heritage.

As the center of Christian faith in Western Visayas, Iloilo showcases significant Spanish Catholic influence, most notably in Jaro Cathedral, a National Historical Landmark and National Shrine, which serves as the seat of the Archdiocese of Jaro. The cathedral's unique features include the free-standing and detached Jaro Belfry and the shrine of Nuestra Señora de la Candelaria, whose image is uniquely perched at its facade—the first Marian image crowned by a pope (John Paul II) and saint in Asia.

In Villa de Arevalo, notable bahay na bato structures include the Camiña Balay Nga Bato and the Convento de Arevalo. Grand Beaux-Arts and Spanish colonial mansions, such as the Lopez Heritage House (Lopez Mansion) and Lizares Mansion (houses the Angelicum School Iloilo of the University of Santo Tomas), are located in Jaro, which also features the Art Deco Jaro Municipal Hall. In Molo, landmarks include the Gothic-style Molo Church. The Casa Real de Iloilo (Royal House of Iloilo), Iloilo's old provincial capitol, exemplifies the bahay na bato style and is declared an Important Cultural Property. Furthermore, Calle Real in the City Proper features contiguous rows of beaux arts, neoclassical, and Art Deco commercial buildings, currently listed in the UNESCO World Heritage Sites Tentative List.

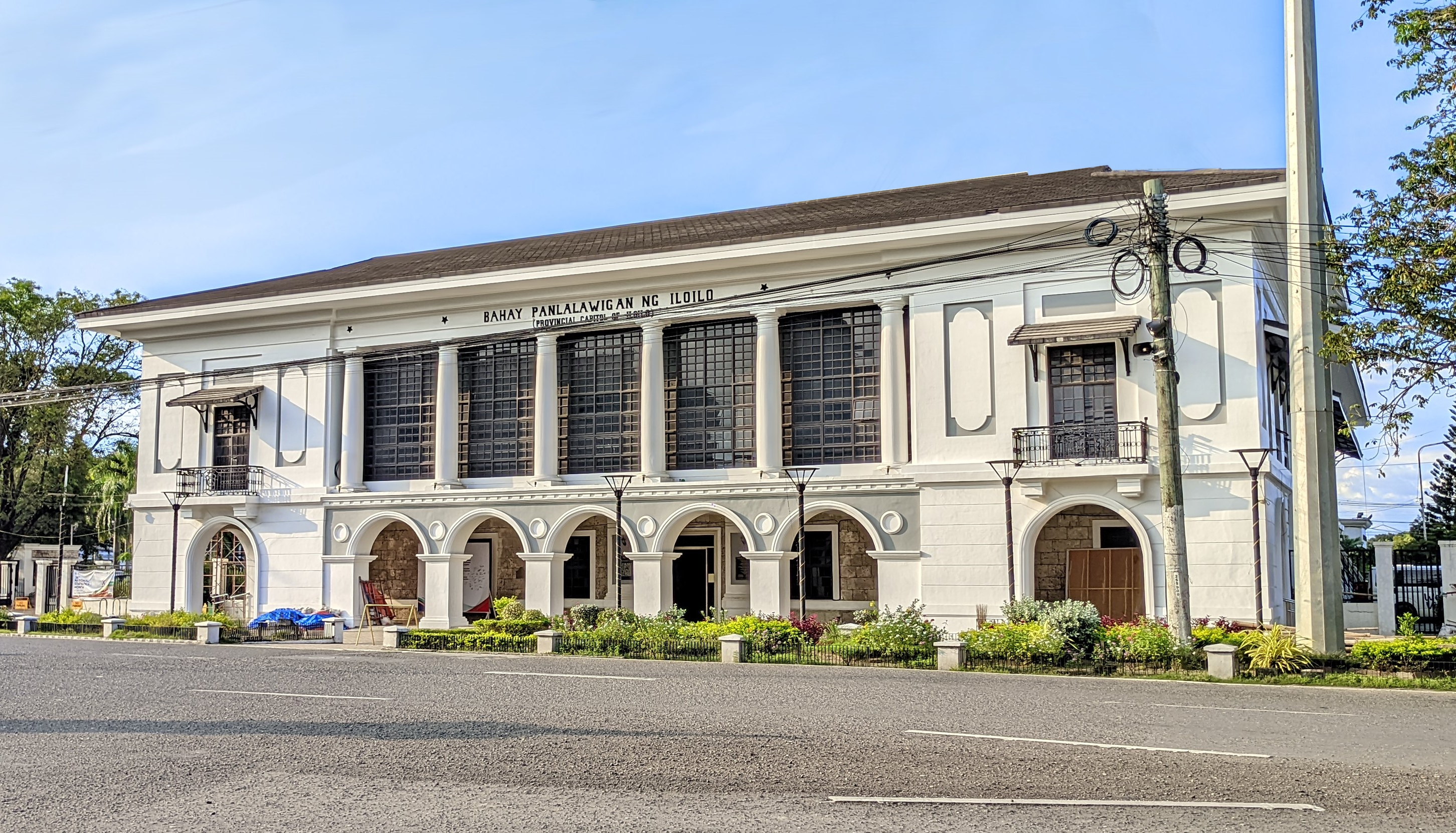
The Casa Real de Iloilo (Royal House of Iloilo), Iloilo's old provincial capitol, was designed in the bahay na bato architectural style. It has been declared as an Important Cultural Property by National Museum of the Philippines.

The American colonial period introduced new civic, educational, and healthcare institutions, leaving behind architectural styles influenced by neoclassical, Art Deco, and early modernist design. Americans, especially Protestant missions from the United States, established key centers that still define parts of the city's educational and religious landscape. These include Central Philippine University (CPU), which was founded by the American Baptist Foreign Mission Society in 1905, and has been a Registered Cultural Property by NCCA and a Marked Historical Site by NHCP, features heritage structures like Franklin Hall, Johnson Hall, Valentine Hall, Roblee Science Hall, Mary Thomas Hall, Weston Hall, and Stuart Hall, which is listed in the Philippine Registry of Heritage by the government.

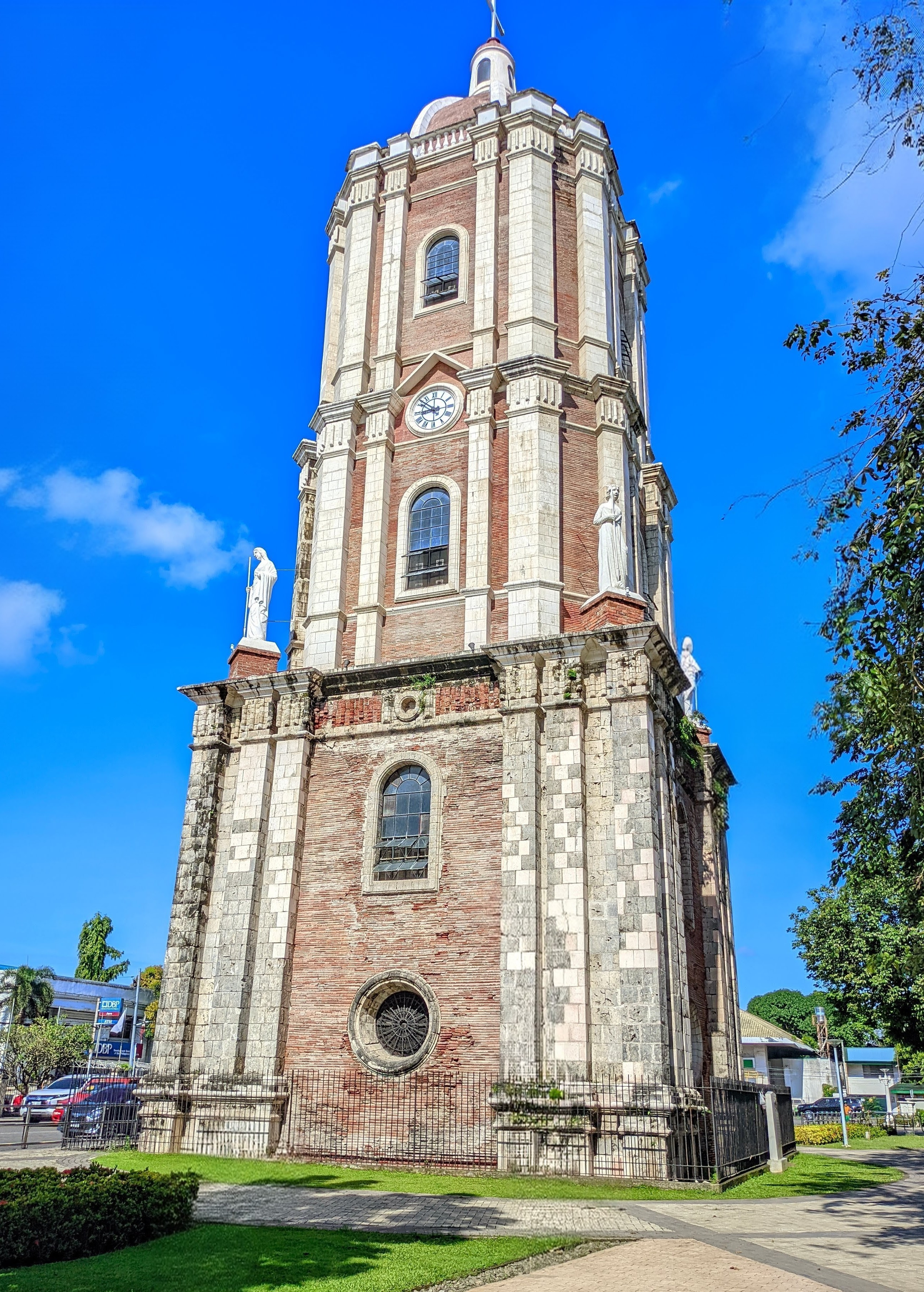
The Jaro Belfry (Campanario de Jaro), a free-standing bell tower built in 1744 during the Spanish colonial period, stands across from the Jaro Cathedral.

The Jaro Evangelical Church, Doane Baptist Church, and the Iloilo Mission Hospital are prominent Protestant-built institutions. A notable structure within CPU is the Central Philippine University Church, distinct for its Malay motif design. Other significant institutional architecture includes the neoclassical and Art Deco buildings of the University of San Agustin (USA) and the century-old Quezon Hall at West Visayas State University (WVSU).

Recent decades have brought significant urban development and the rise of contemporary architecture, specifically in Mandurriao. The Iloilo Convention Center, designed by architect William Coscolluela, integrates modern design with cultural motifs inspired by the Dinagyang Festival and Paraw Regatta.

Clock Tower at Festive Walk Parade in Iloilo Business Park.

Restoration initiatives continue across the city, with projects such as the reconstruction of Fort San Pedro, described as a 17th-century Spanish military fortress, and the rehabilitation of the Iloilo Central Market, notable for its Art Deco façade. Most modern buildings are concentrated in the economic triangle formed by Atria Park District, Iloilo City Center, SM City Iloilo Complex, and Megaworld's Iloilo Business Park, featuring structures like the SM Strata twin towers, Injap Tower Hotel, and the Festive Walk Parade leisure strip.

Some Heritage Buildings in the Calle Real Heritage Zone

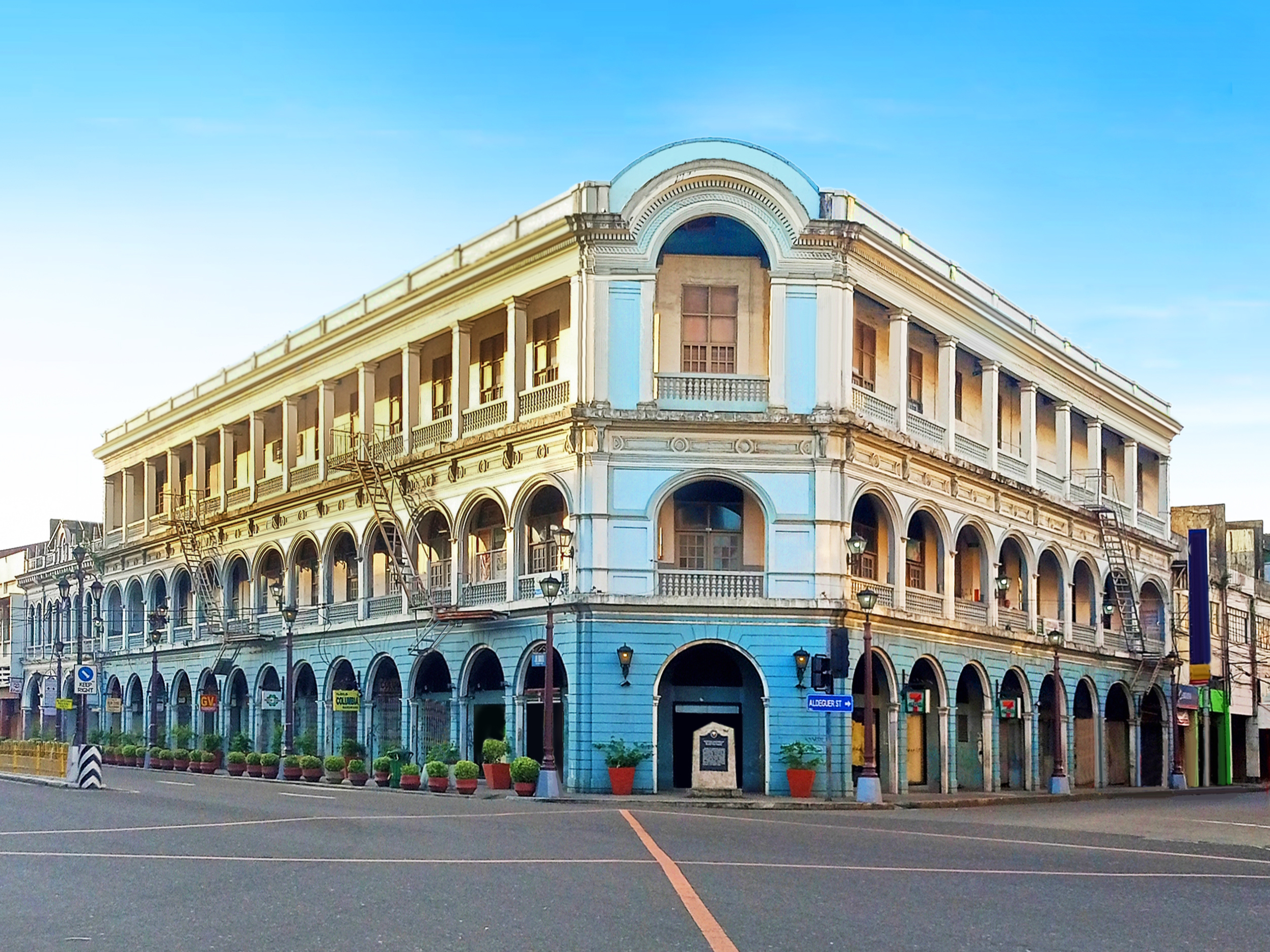
Eusebio Villanueva Building

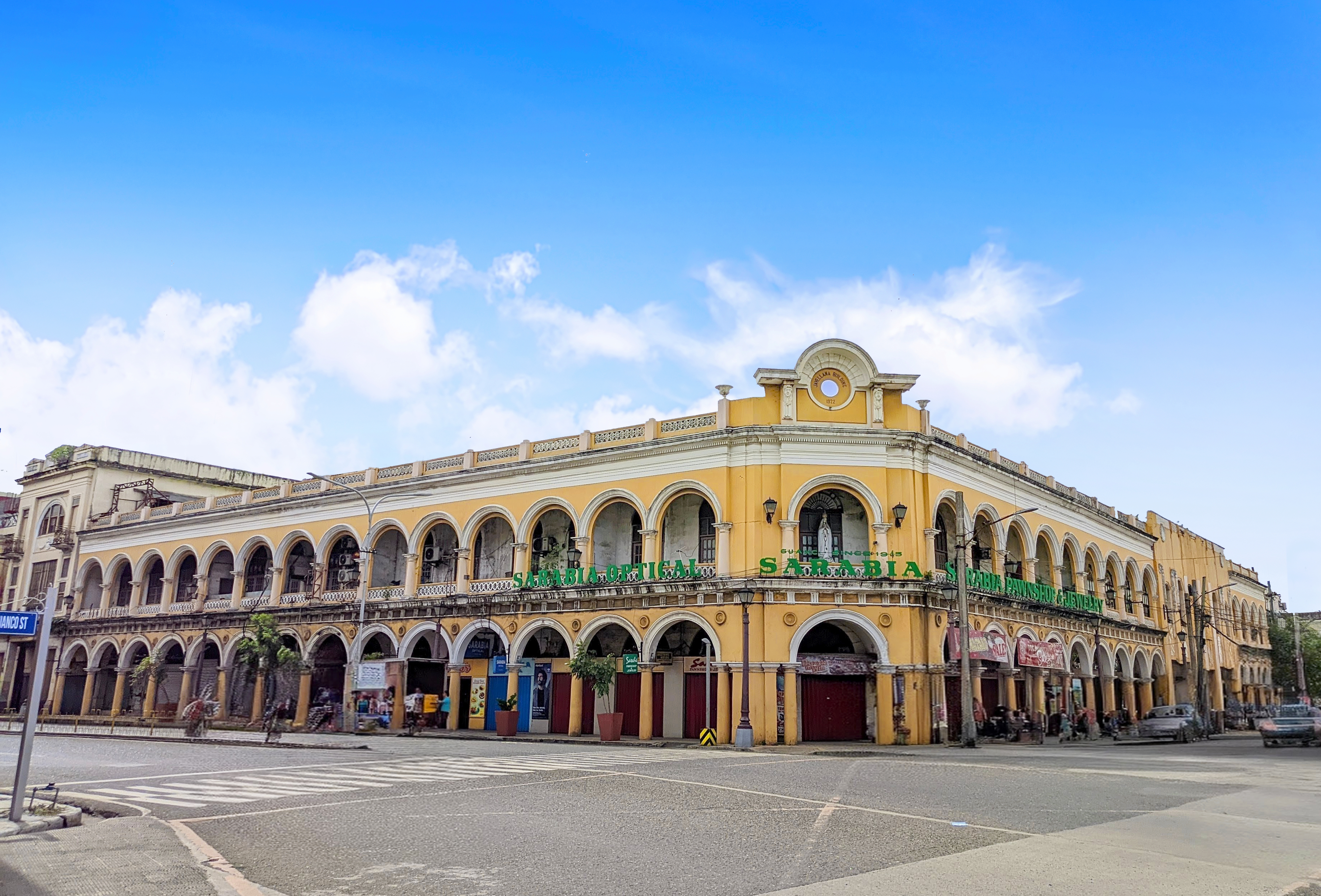
Javellana Building

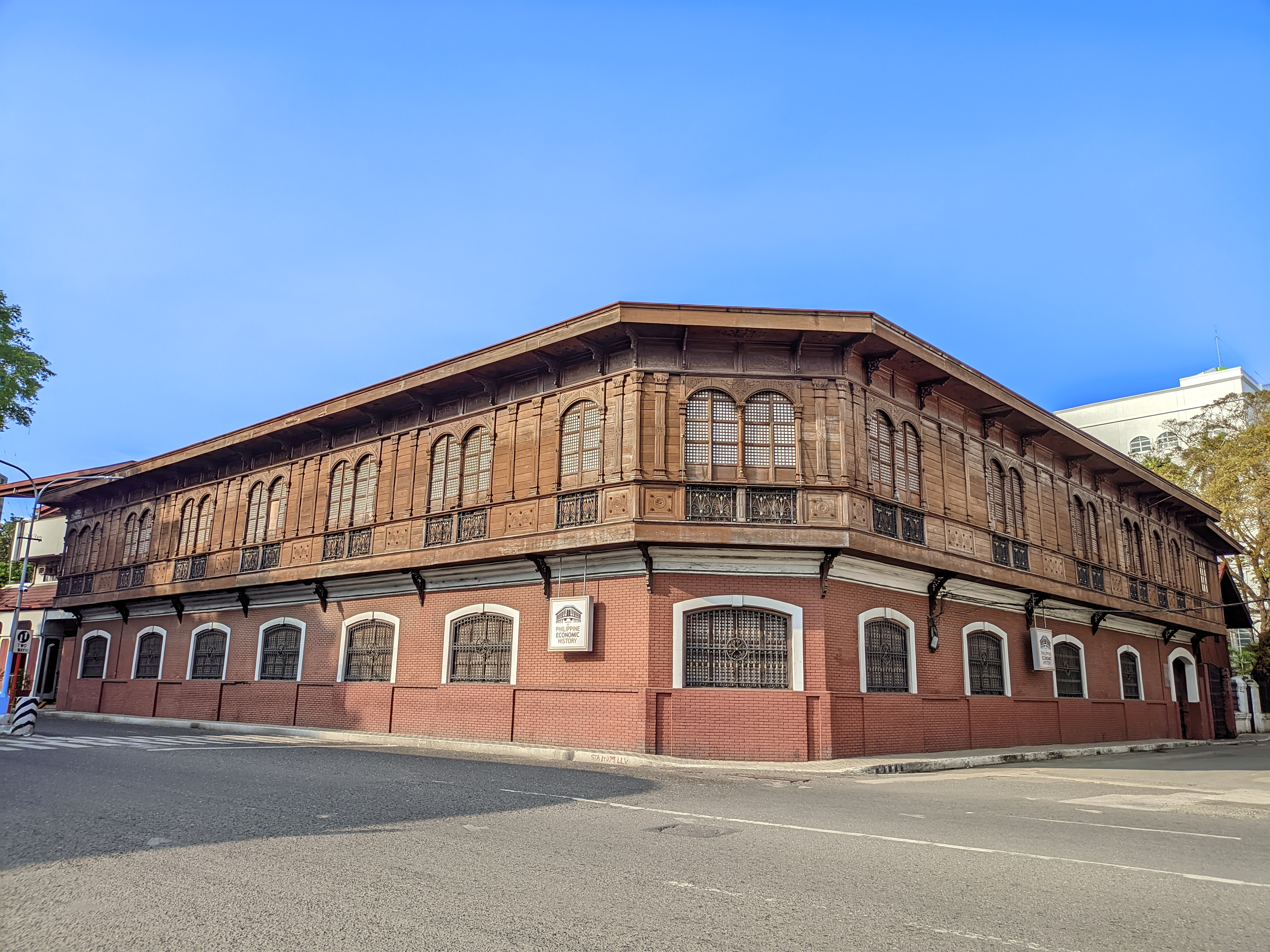
Elizalde and Company Building houses the Museum of Philippine Economic History

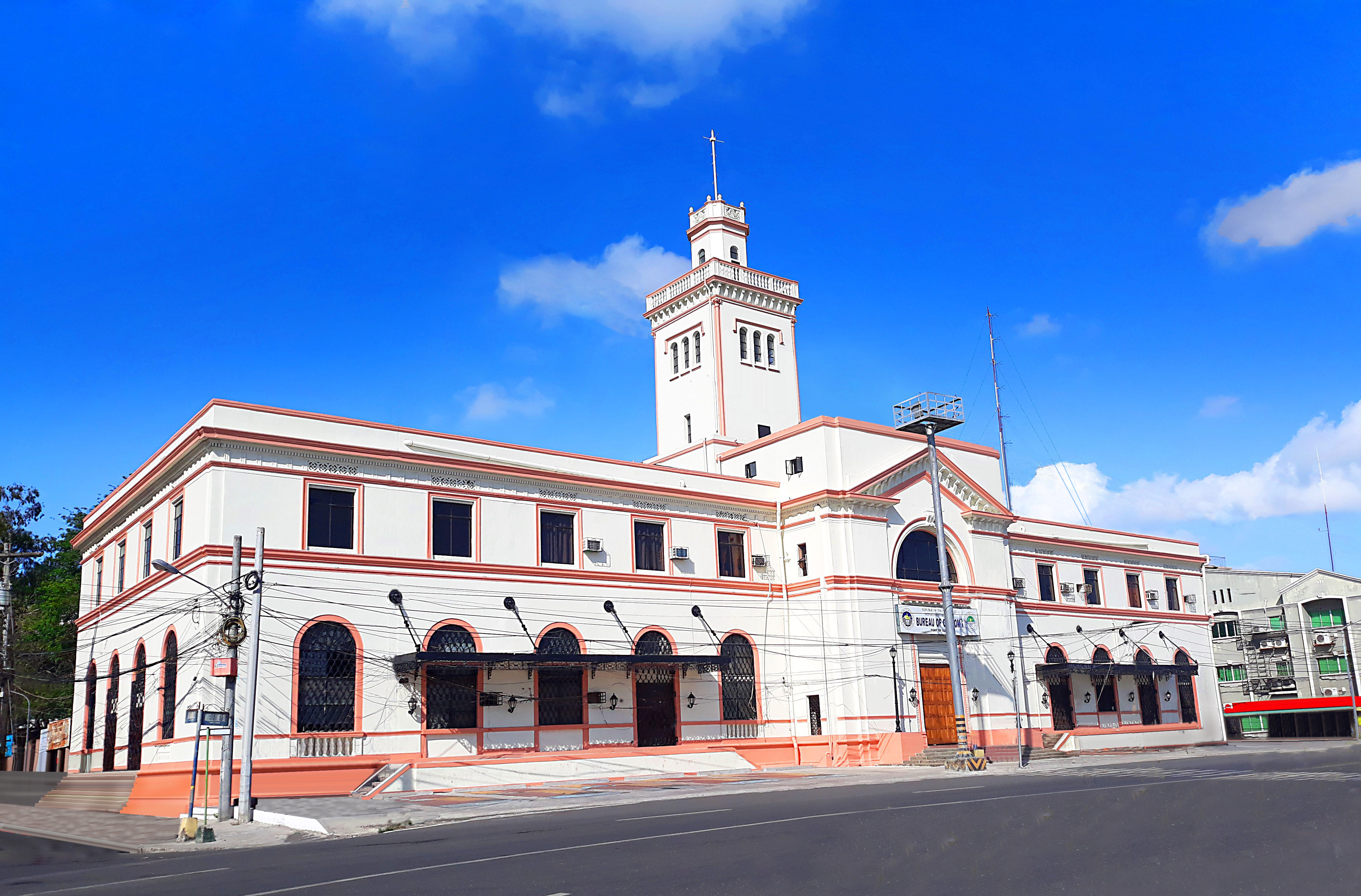
Iloilo Customs House houses the Museum of Philippine Maritime History

=== Sustainability ===
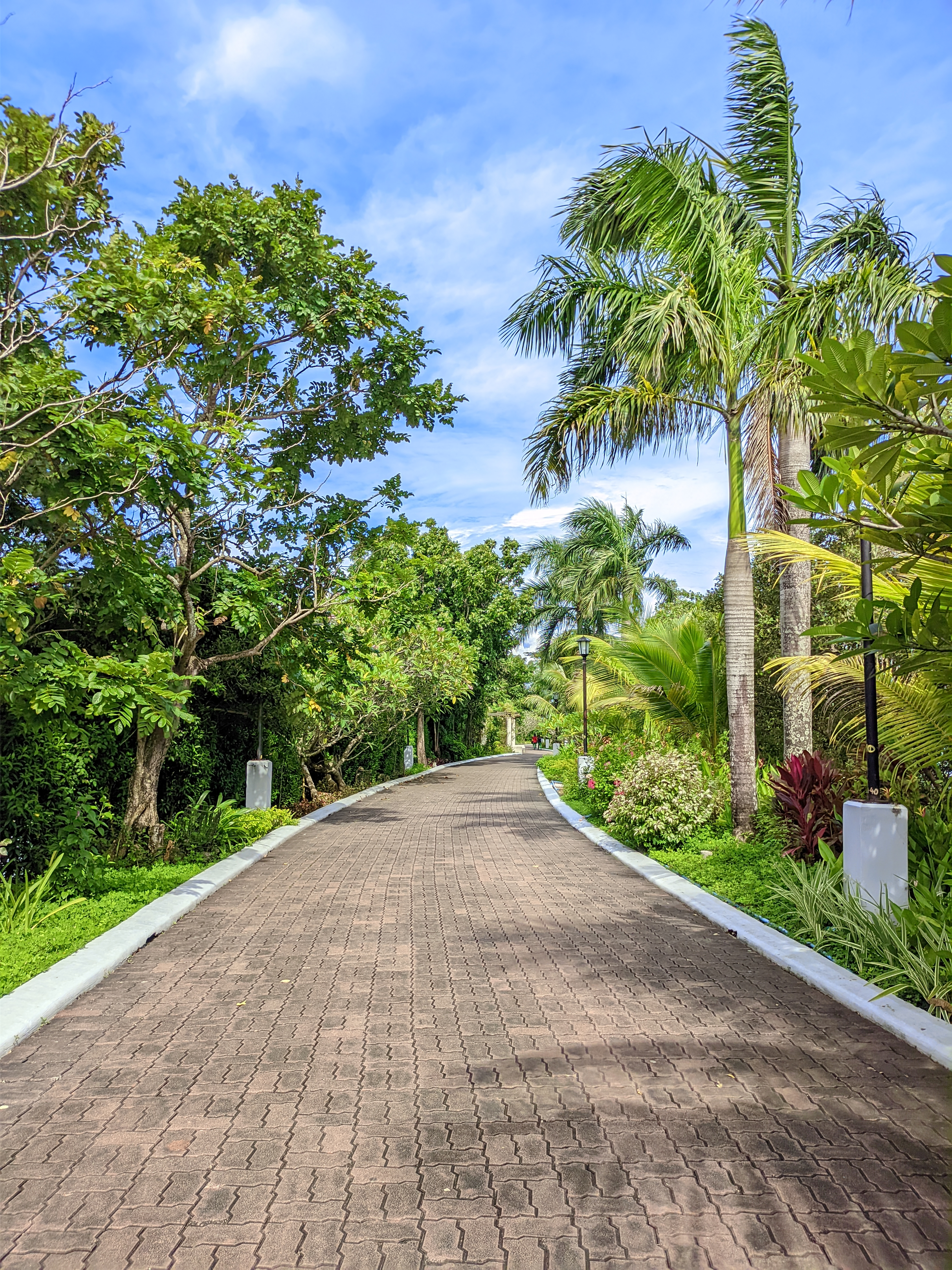
Iloilo River Esplanade, the longest linear park in the Philippines with its first phase.

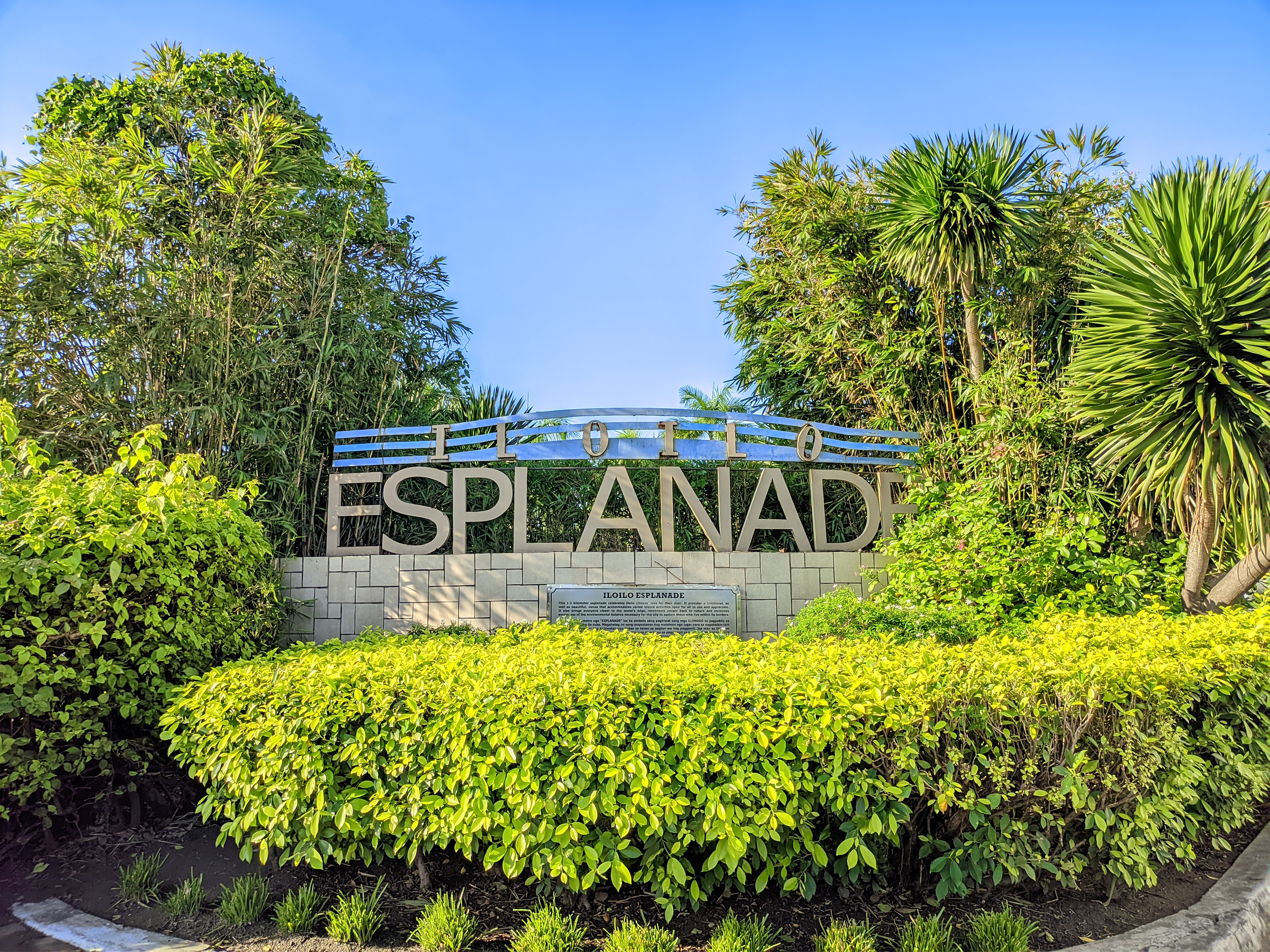
Iloilo River Esplanade Welcome Signage.

Iloilo City stands out as a model of sustainable urban development, blending green initiatives, recreational spaces, and smart city innovations. Recognized with the 2017 Clean Air City Award and the 2020 ASEAN Clean Tourist City Award, the city has implemented policies such as banning plastic straws, mandating wastewater treatment along the Iloilo River, and enforcing biodegradable waste segregation. The Iloilo Batiano River Development Project, a two-time Galing Pook Award winner (2018 and 2022), showcases replicable environmental practices, while tree-planting programs and expanded mangrove forests enhance biodiversity and reduce the city's carbon footprint.

The Iloilo River Esplanade, the Philippines’ longest linear park, exemplifies the city's commitment to green spaces. Designed by Filipino architect Paulo Alcazaren, it features 22 of the country's 35 endemic mangrove species, serving as a vital marine breeding ground. Historic plazas with ornamental gardens, the revitalized Sunburst Park, the Freedom Grandstand at Muelle Loney with mini-gardens, and the landscaped Iloilo Provincial Capitol complex—home to the National Museum Western Visayas. Additionally, all of the city's plazas—Plaza Libertad, Jaro Plaza, Molo Plaza, La Paz Plaza, Mandurriao Plaza, and Arevalo Plaza—have also undergone rehabilitation.

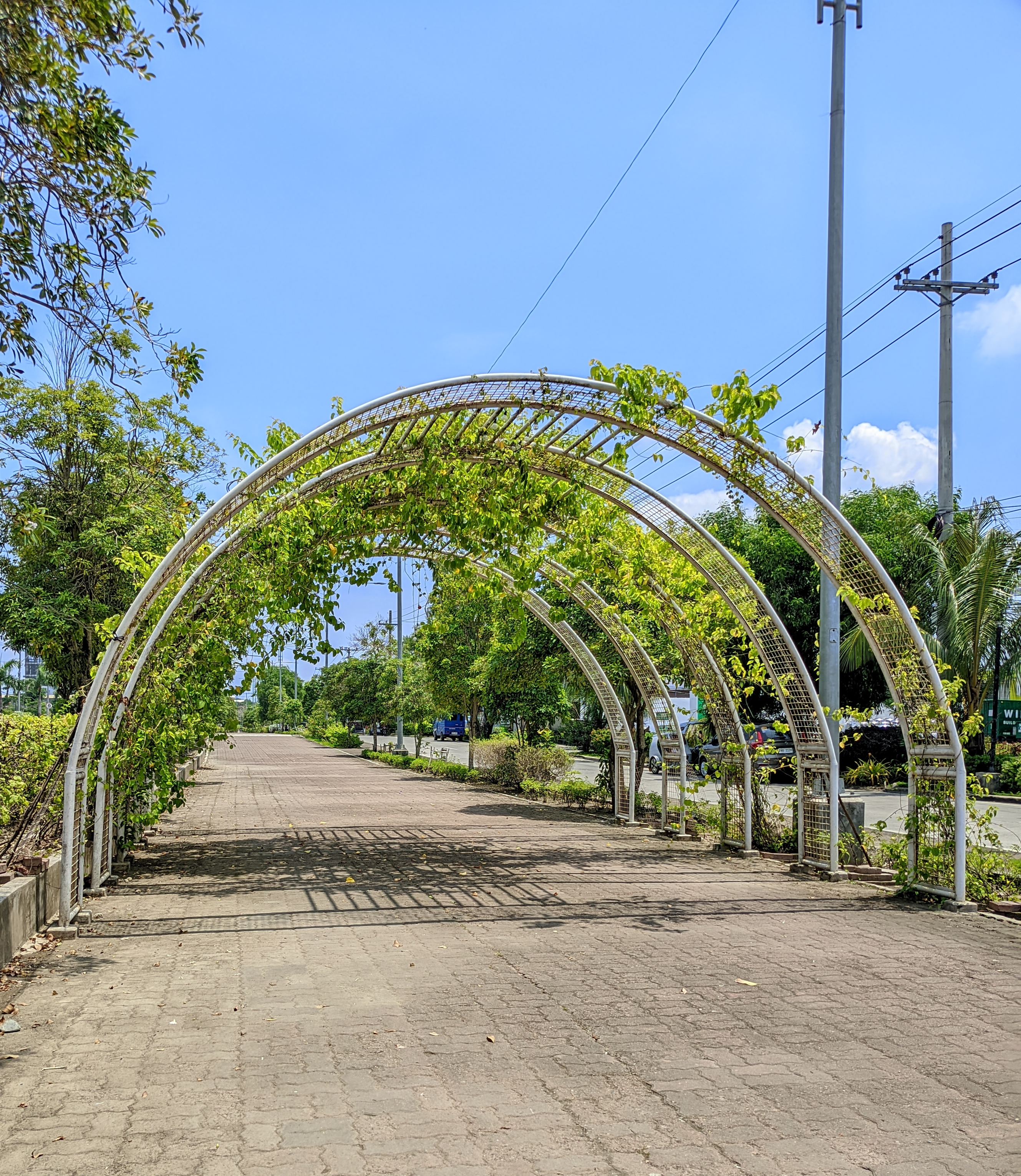
A protected and dedicated bike and jogging lane along Diversion Road in Jaro District.

The Iloilo River Rehabilitation Project, launched in 2010, marked a major environmental initiative aimed at restoring the river's ecosystem and enhancing the overall quality of life in Iloilo City. Under the leadership of then Mayor Jed Patrick E. Mabilog, the program implemented measures such as the relocation of informal settlers along the riverbanks, enforcement of environmental regulations, extensive mangrove reforestation, and the creation of the Iloilo River Esplanade, a riverside park that has since become one of the city's key landmarks.

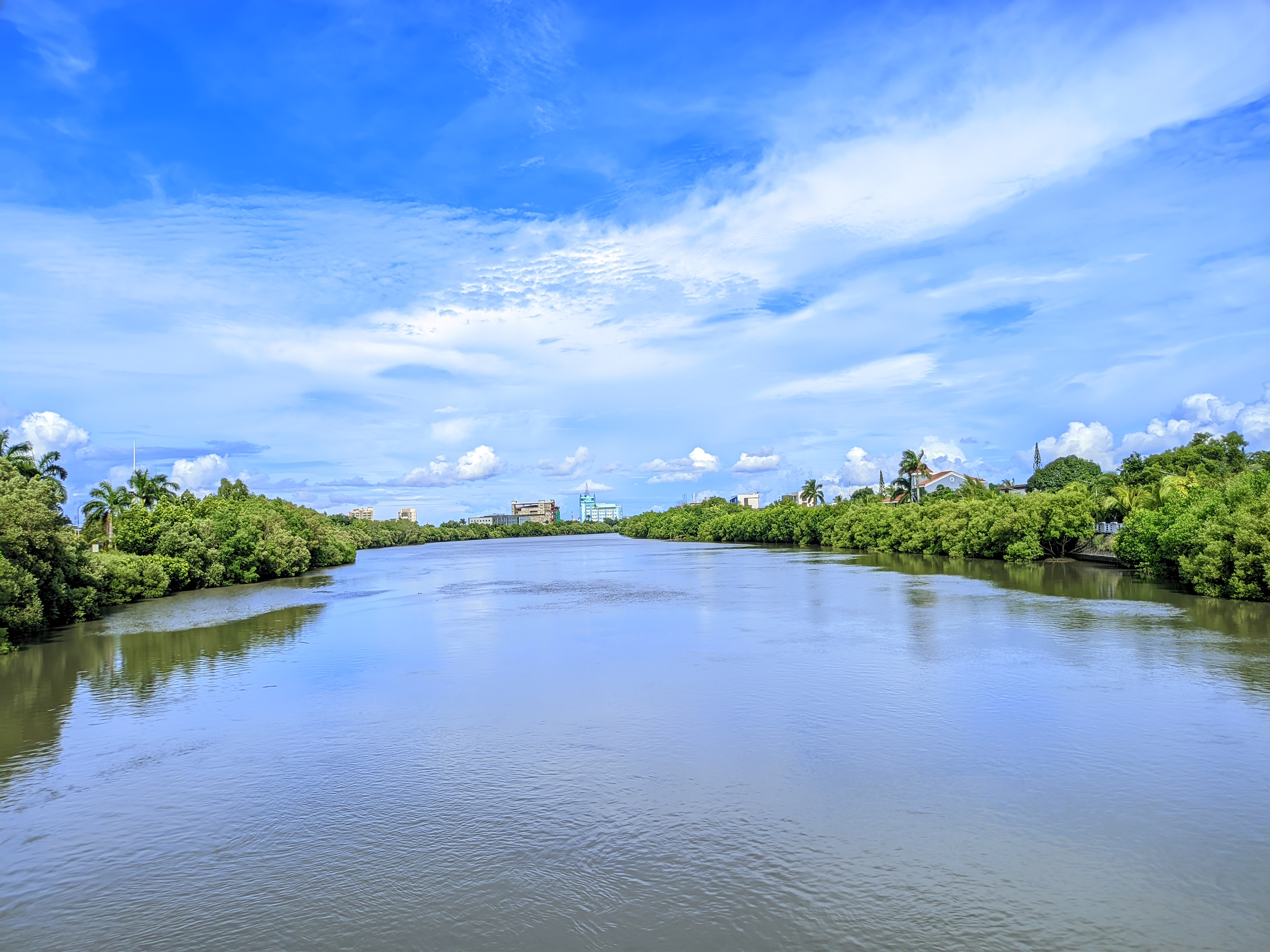
The Iloilo River is home to 22 of the 35 true mangrove species known in the Philippines.

The project resulted in cleaner waterways, improved marine biodiversity, and reduced flooding in nearby areas. Its success has been recognized both nationally and internationally, with the Iloilo River receiving multiple honors, including the ASEAN Environmentally Sustainable City Award (2015), the International Awards for Livable Communities (LivCom Award), the Gawad Paglilingkod sa Sambayanan (Gawad Lingkod Bayan) from the Civil Service Commission, and recognition as a “Waterfront Development Model” by the United Nations Human Settlements Programme (UN-Habitat). These achievements helped establish Iloilo City as a model for sustainable urban development and environmental management in the Philippines.

Iloilo is also advancing as a smart city, integrating technology to improve livability and sustainability. Initiatives include free public Wi-Fi, electric public transport vehicles, flood-prevention pumping stations, and air quality monitoring systems that meet international standards. Taxis use navigation systems, and barangays employ CCTV for traffic and safety management. The city's bike-friendly programs, such as the I-Bike Program, have earned awards like the 2018 Most Bike-Friendly City citation and Gold Awards in the 2021 and 2022 National Bike Day Bike Lane Awards. In 2024, Iloilo was ranked 6th among the world's top 18 fitness-friendly cities by Headline Bulletin.

== Demographics ==
Population census of Iloilo City
Year	Pop.	±% p.a.
1903	52,472	—
1918	77,925	+2.67%
1939	116,277	+1.92%
1948	110,122	−0.60%
1960	151,266	+2.68%
1970	209,738	+3.32%
1975	227,027	+1.60%
1980	244,827	+1.52%
1990	309,505	+2.37%
1995	334,539	+1.47%
2000	366,391	+1.97%
2007	418,710	+1.86%
2010	424,619	+0.51%
2015	447,992	+1.03%
2020	457,626	+0.45%
2024	473,728	+0.83%
Source: Philippine Statistics Authority

In the 2024 census, Iloilo City had a population of 473,728 people, making it the 25th most populous city in the Philippines and the fourth most populous city in the Visayas. The population consists of 224,203 males (49.1%) and 232,423 females (50.9%). It has a population density of 6,047/km^{2} (15,662/sq mi).

=== Language ===
Hiligaynon is the predominant language spoken in Iloilo City. English serves as the primary language for business and education. Other local languages, such as Karay-a (also known as Kinaray-a or the outdated term Haraya), are spoken by a minority from certain parts of Iloilo province. Spanish, once widely used during the colonial era and into the 1980s, is now fading, though a broken Spanish creole persists among a few families of Spanish descent and elderly sugar barons who concentrate around the districts of Jaro and Arevalo where the Spaniards and Mexicans historically settled. Chinese, specifically the dialect of Hokkien is often spoken in the district of Molo, the city's Chinatown whereas Indian Hindi can be found in Mandurriao.

Hiligaynon, part of the Visayan language family within the Malayo-Polynesian languages, is prevalent across Panay, Guimaras, and Negros islands. It is also the main language in Soccsksargen, Mindanao, where most residents trace their ancestry to Hiligaynon speakers. Due to Iloilo's 300-year history as a Spanish colony, Hiligaynon incorporates numerous Spanish loanwords, such as guerra (war), puerta (door), golpe (strike), aguanta (endure), puerto (port), calle (street), and edificio (building).

The language is concentrated in the provinces of Iloilo, Guimaras, and Negros Occidental. In Iloilo and Negros Occidental, it is often referred to as "Ilonggo" (Spanish: Ilongo/Ylongo), a term that also denotes the ethnolinguistic group and cultural identity of native Hiligaynon speakers in Iloilo. The distinction between "Hiligaynon" and "Ilonggo" remains ambiguous, with many locals describing Hiligaynon as the language and Ilonggo as the identity or culture tied to Iloilo.

=== Religion ===
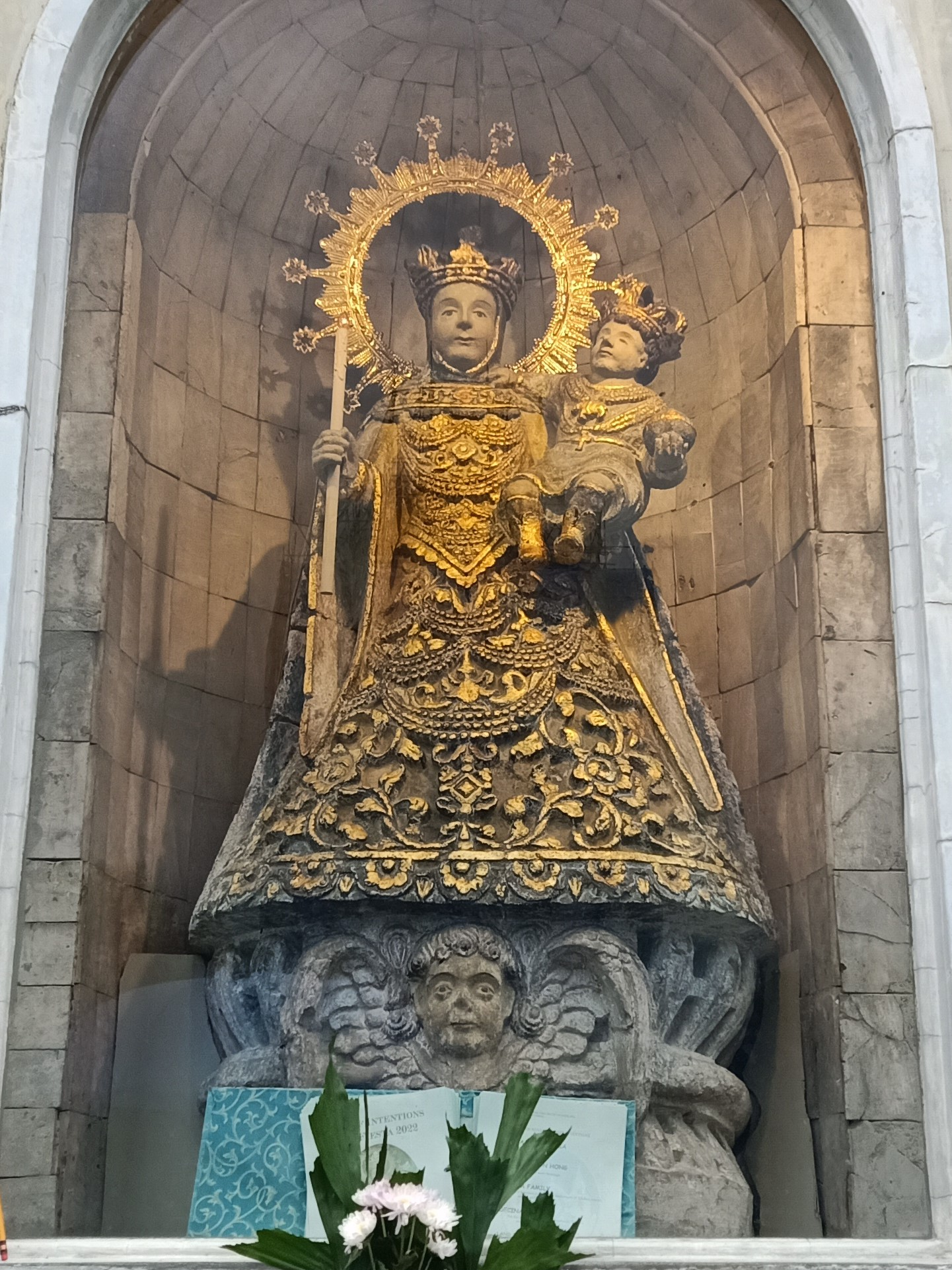
Nuestra Señora de la Candelaria (Our Lady of Candles) in Jaro Cathedral, the Roman Catholic patron of Western Visayas region, and Negros Occidental and Romblon provinces. It is the first Marian image crowned personally by a Pope and Saint in Asia.

Iloilo City is a significant religious center in the Philippines, shaped by 300 years of Spanish colonization that established a predominantly Catholic population. Over 90 percent of residents adhere to the Roman Catholic Church, with Protestant denominations (5 percent), Iglesia ni Cristo (2 percent), and the Philippine Independent Church or Aglipayans (1 percent)—a form of Episcopal Anglo-Catholicism—representing notable minorities.

The city's district of Jaro has long been a hub of Christian institutions. The Spanish introduced Roman Catholicism, establishing the Archdiocese of Jaro, while American colonial rule brought Protestantism, leading to the founding of key institutions. The Jaro Metropolitan Cathedral, designated a National Shrine—the second in the Visayas and Mindanao and the second Marian-dedicated shrine outside Luzon—is the seat of the Archdiocese of Jaro and a focal point for devotion to Our Lady of Candles (Nuestra Señora de la Candelaria), the patroness of Western Visayas, Negros Occidental and Romblon, alongside Saint Elizabeth of Hungary.

Jaro Evangelical Church is the first Baptist Church in the Philippines, and the first Protestant church outside Manila.

The archdiocese, one of the country's oldest and largest, began as a parish in 1587, covering the provinces of Iloilo, Guimaras, Antique in Western Visayas, and Negros Occidental in Negros Island. Nuestra Señora de la Candelaria holds the distinction of being the first Marian image in the Philippines to be canonically crowned in person by a pope and saint—Pope St. John Paul II—in 1981. This recognition further solidified Iloilo, particularly Jaro, as the center of Candelaria devotion in the Philippines, drawing pilgrims and devotees from across the nation each February 2.

It became a diocese in 1865 under Pope Pius IX, with jurisdiction over suffragan bishops in Mindoro, Palawan, Zamboanga, Iloilo Province, Negros Oriental, Guimaras, San Jose de Buenavista, Capiz, Bacolod, San Carlos, and Kabankalan.

Elevated to a metropolitan archdiocese by Pope Pius XII, it later ceded territory to form the dioceses of Zamboanga (1910), Bacolod (1932), Mindoro (1936), Capiz (1951), and the Territorial Prelature of San Jose de Antique (1962), though the latter remains partially under its purview.

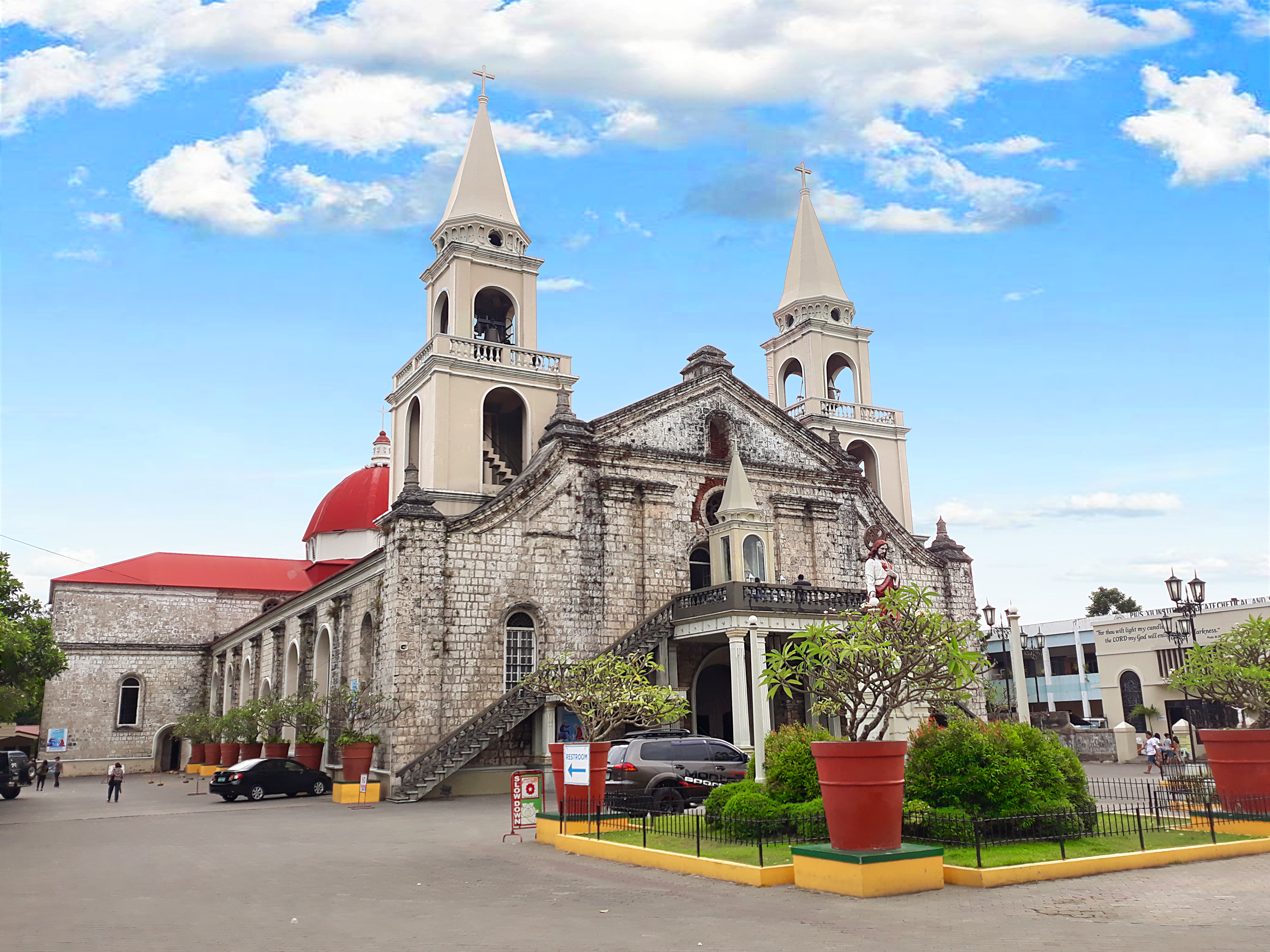
The Jaro Metropolitan Cathedral or the National Shrine of Our Lady of Candles, is the seat of Roman Catholicism in Western Visayas, Romblon, and Negros Occidental. Visited by pilgrims and devotees, it is the "Center of Candelaria Devotion in the Philippines".

The Cathedral of Our Lady of Peace and Good Voyage in La Paz serves as the episcopal seat of the Diocese of Iloilo for the Iglesia Filipina Independiente (Aglipayan Church). Protestantism, introduced by Americans after the 1898 Treaty of Paris, grew due to Iloilo's economic prominence in the early 1900s and the religious freedom upheld by the American colonial government. Presbyterians established the Iloilo Mission Hospital in 1901, the first American and Protestant hospital in the Philippines.

Protestant Baptists founded the Jaro Evangelical Church in 1900 (the country's oldest Baptist church and first Protestant church outside Manila), Central Philippine University in 1905 (the first Baptist and second American university in the country and in Asia), and the Convention of Philippine Baptist Churches. Seventh-day Adventists, arriving later outside the early Protestant comity agreement, established the Jaro Adventist Center, the first organized Adventist church outside Manila.

Other Christian groups, such as Iglesia ni Cristo and The Church of Jesus Christ of Latter-day Saints, have a presence, alongside non-Christian communities including Muslims from southern Philippines, Sikhs from Indian immigrants, and Taoists and Buddhists from Chinese immigrants.e to the Santo Niño de Arevalo, the third oldest image of the Holy Child in the Philippines.

Notable Roman Catholic Churches of the City of Iloilo

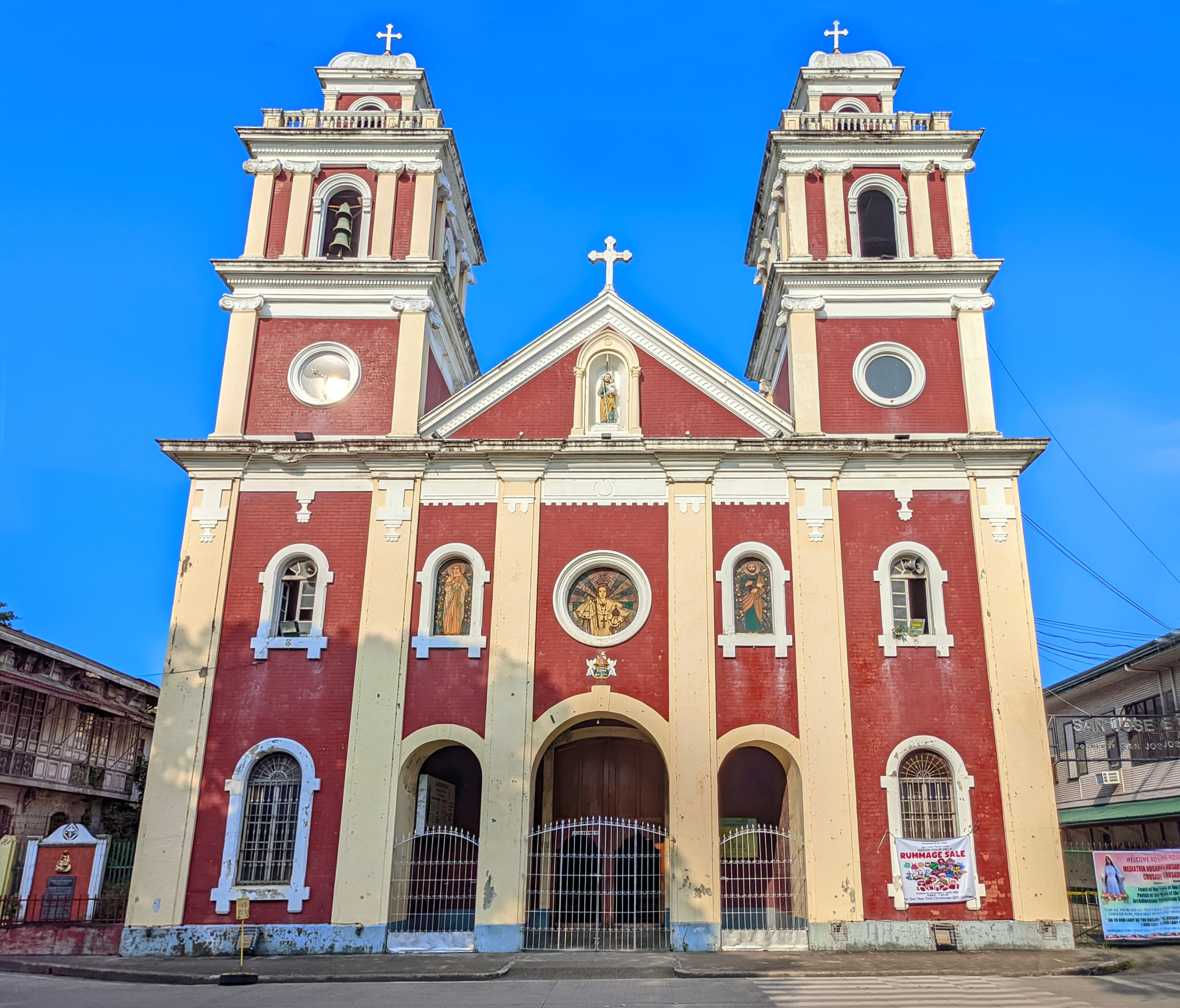
San Jose Church is regarded as the first ever church in Iloilo City.

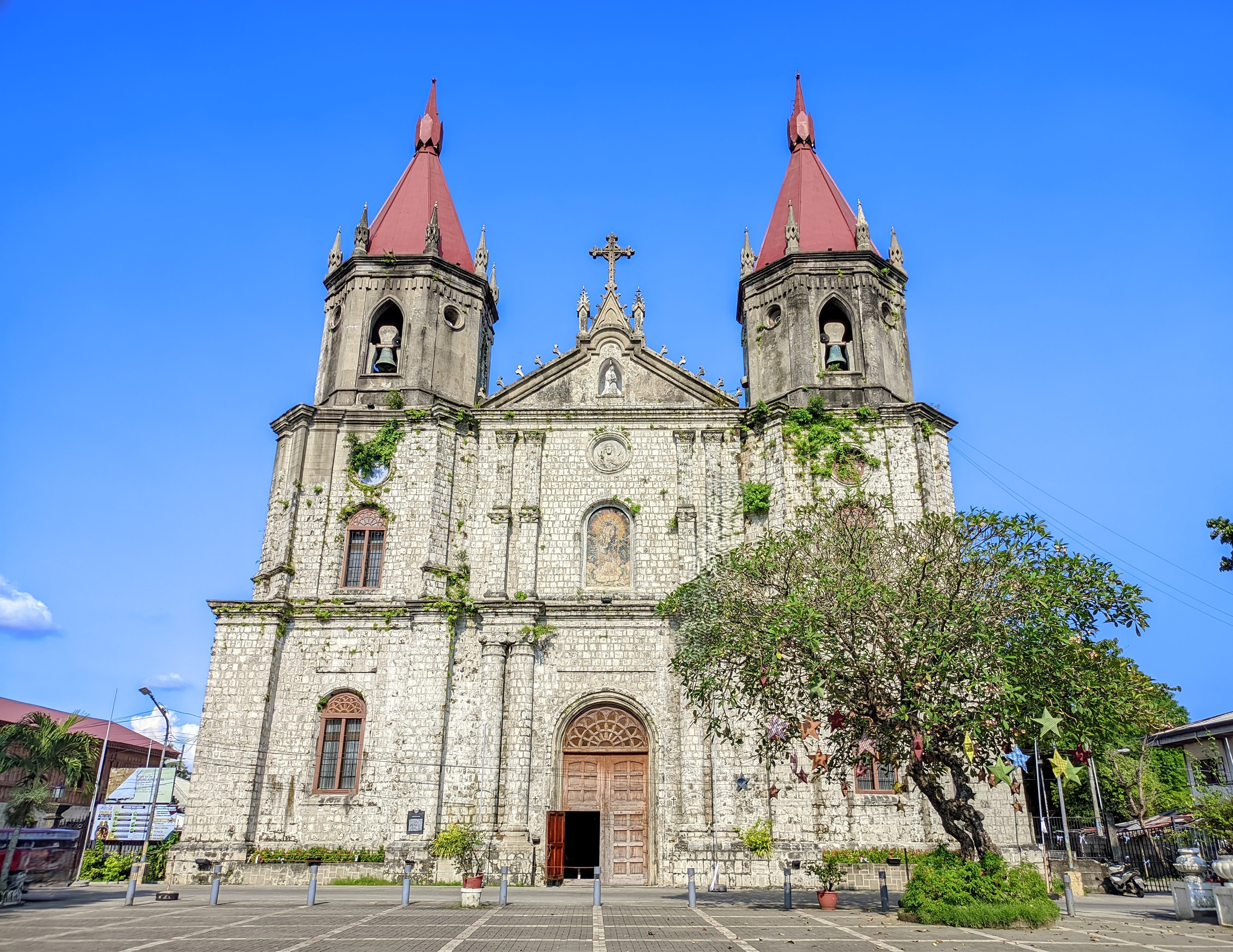
Molo Church is the only Gothic-style church outside Metro Manila.

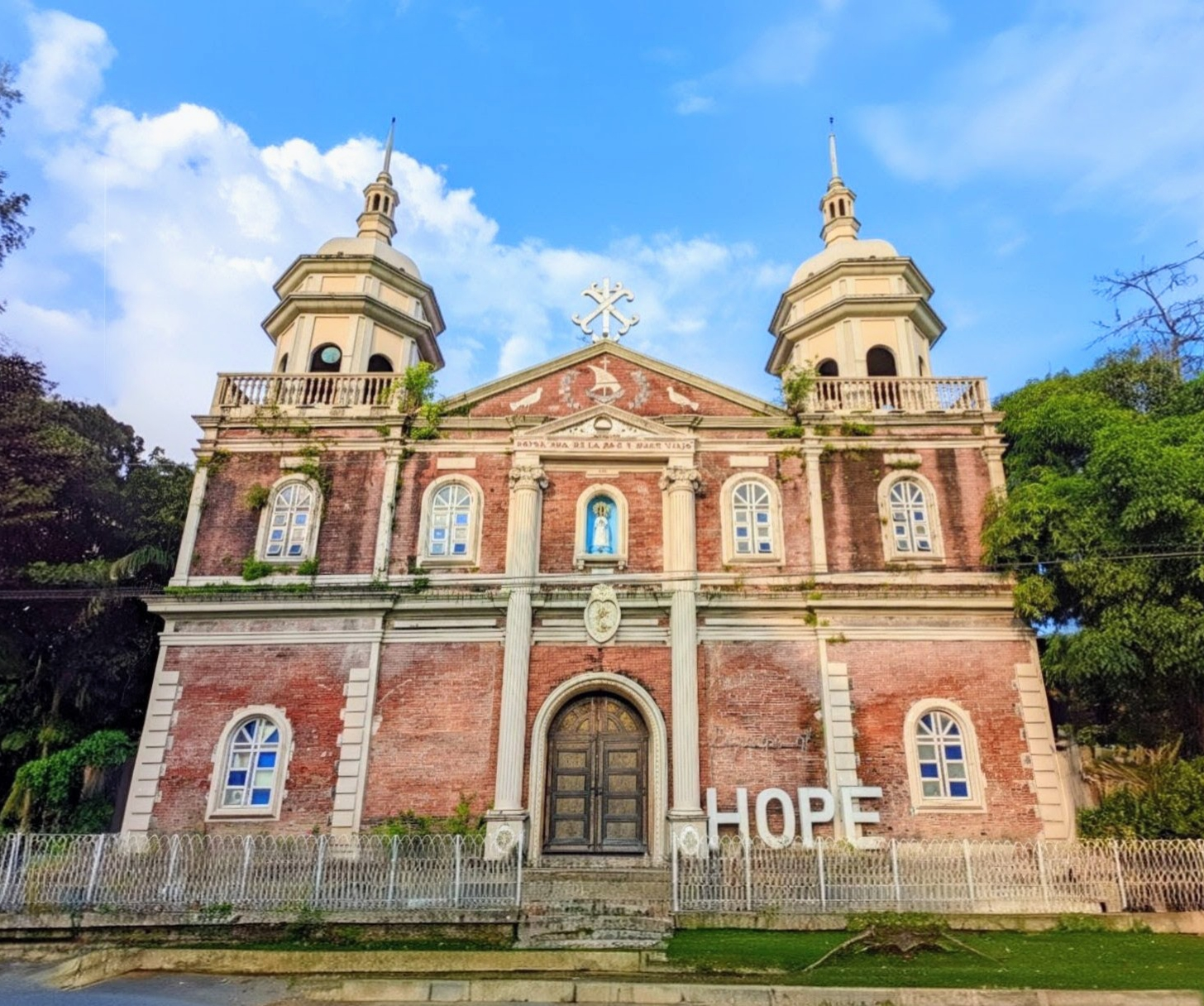
La Paz Church is dedicated to Our Lady of Peace and Good Voyage.

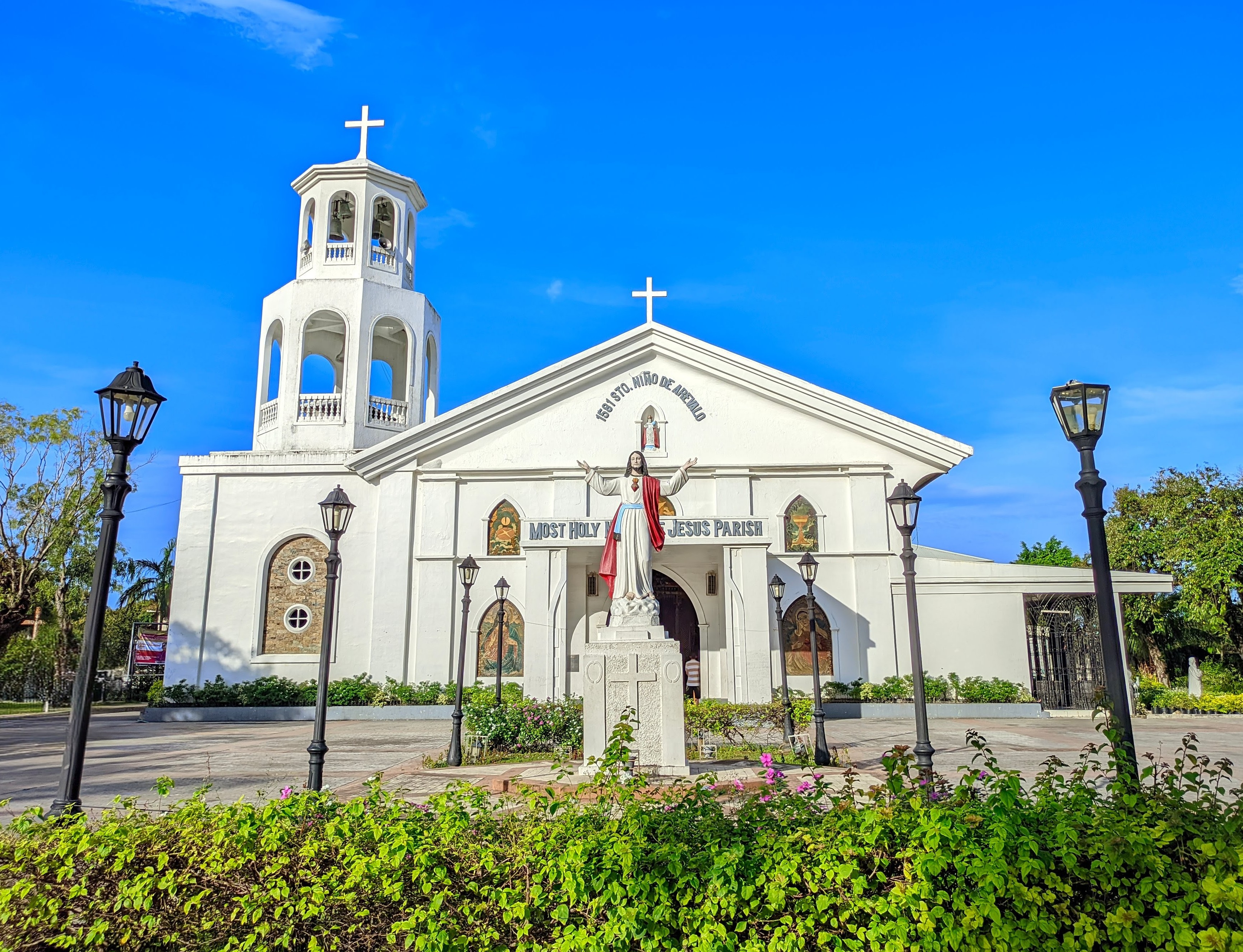
Arevalo Church is home to the Santo Niño de Arevalo, the third oldest image of the Holy Child in the Philippines.

== Economy ==
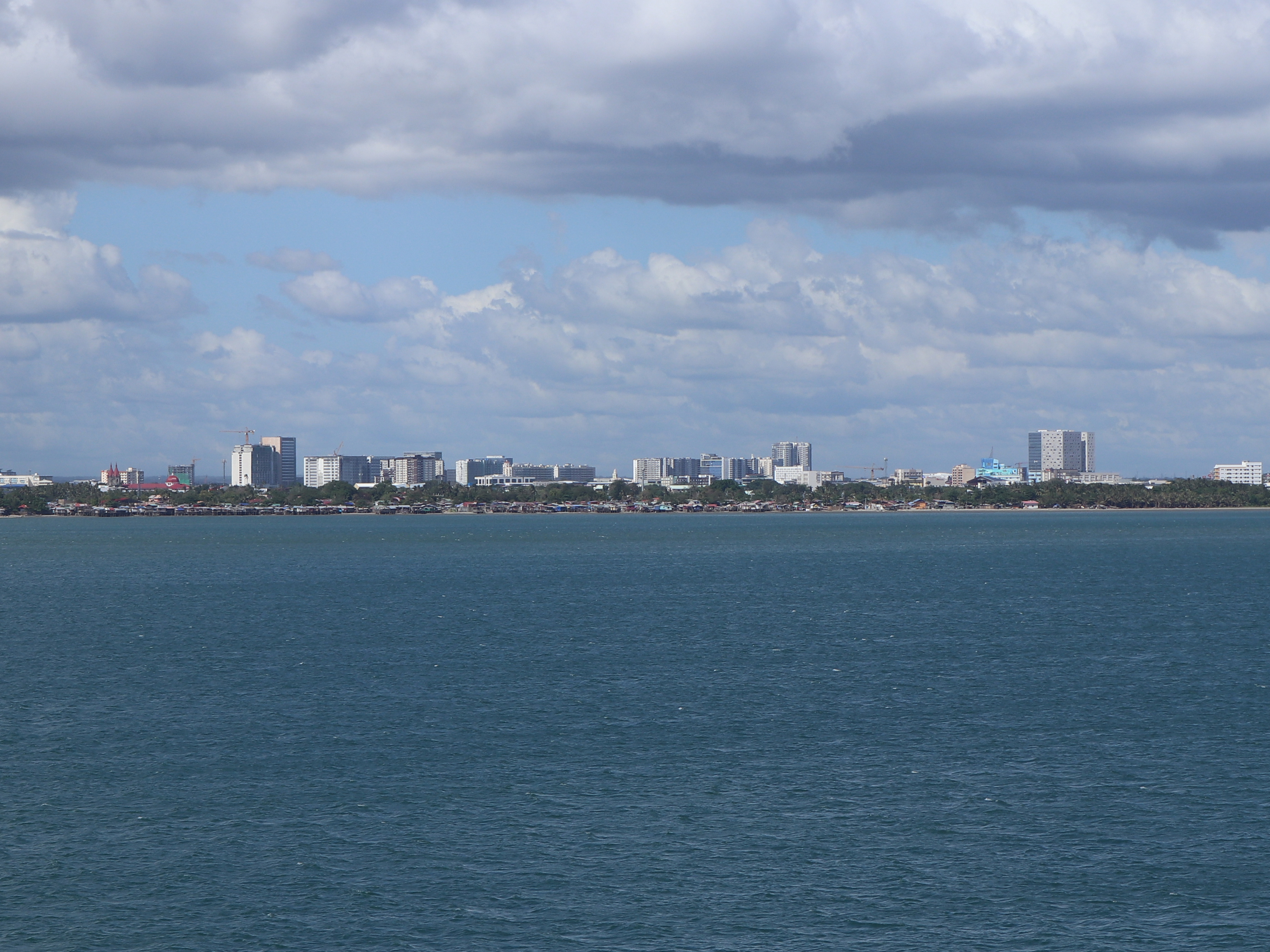
The skyline of Mandurriao, the new central business district of Iloilo City.

Iloilo City has the third-largest economy in the Visayas, after Cebu City and Lapu-Lapu City, with a gross domestic product (GDP) of ₱171.57 billion in 2024, and the third-fastest growth among highly urbanized cities (HUCs) in the Philippines. It serves as the economic hub of Western Visayas for trade, commerce, finance, technology, medical tourism, hospitality, real estate, tourism, education, and industry. Key sectors include port management, telecommunications, utilities, banking, retail, real estate, tourism, and business process outsourcing (BPO).

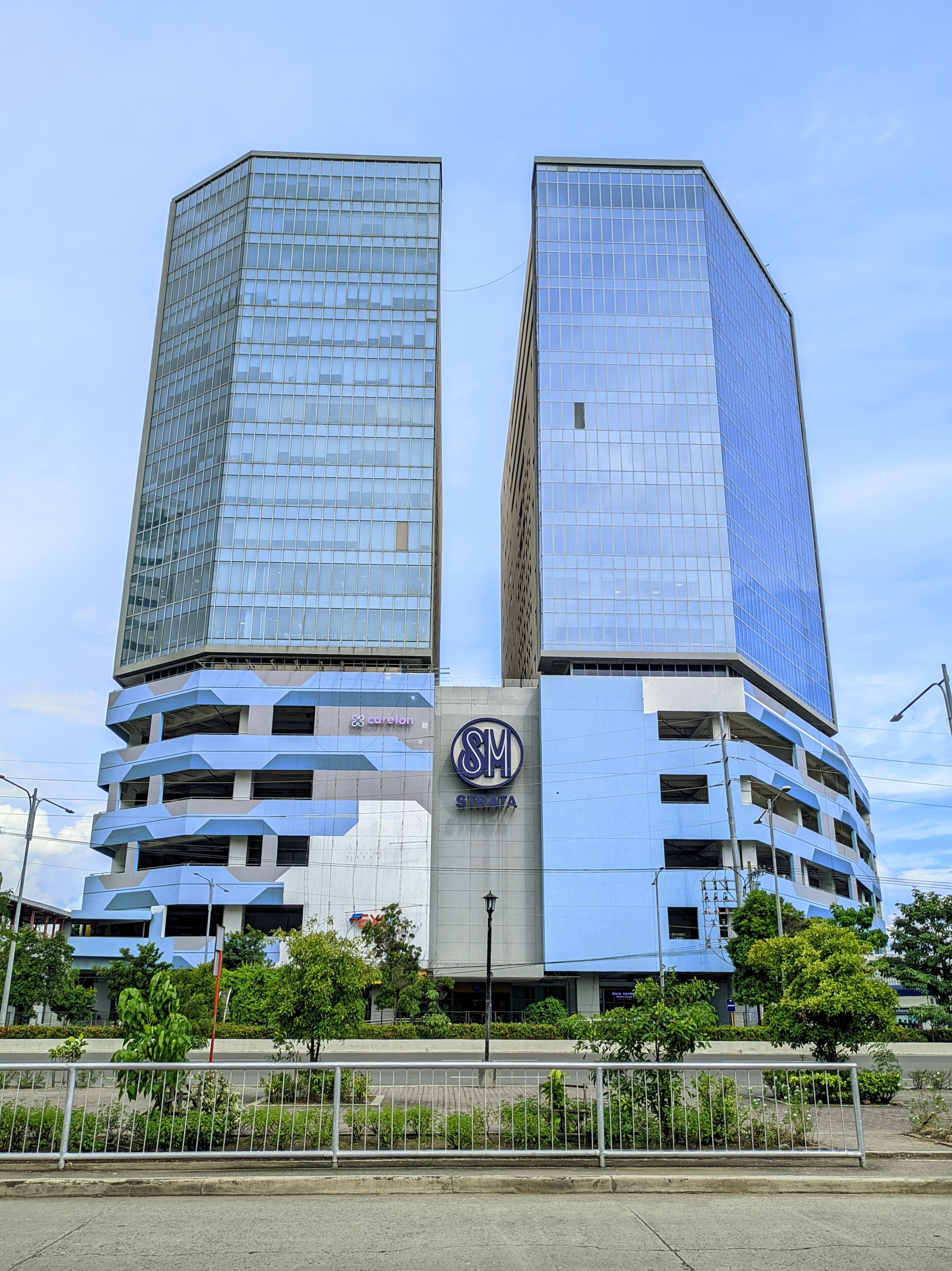
The SM Strata, an 18-storey twin towers houses IT-BPM/Shared Services companies like Carelon Global Solutions (subsidiary of Elevance Health), EXL, Sagility, HGS, Telus Digital, and TTEC.

Historically, Iloilo's economy thrived during the Spanish colonial period, when sugar was its primary export. The opening of its port to international trade in 1855 fueled a sugar boom, generating immense wealth and establishing affluent families—such as Lacson, Locsin, Ledesma, Montinola, and Lopez—who built many haciendas in the city. It positioned Iloilo as the Philippines’ second-most important economic center after Manila. Post-World War II, the sugar industry declined, diminishing the city's economic stature.

Iloilo City has one of the Philippines' busiest ports. The Visayas Container Terminal, formerly Iloilo International Commercial Port, which was privatized and now managed and operated by International Container Terminal Services, Inc., handles international sea cargo with destinations like Shanghai and Xiamen in China. The Port of Iloilo which operates the Iloilo Domestic Port in City Proper, Lapuz Fastcraft Terminal and Lapuz Roro Wharf in Lapuz, the and Guimaras-Iloilo Ferry Terminal generates revenue and has become the inter-island gateways linking the city and province with Guimaras, Palawan, Negros, Mindanao, and Cebu islands.

The city ranks third in bank savings deposits and accounts in the country and has the third highest GDP per capita among highly urbanized cities (HUCs) outside Metro Manila. It also has one of the lowest crime rate nationwide, the highest life expectancy in Visayas and Mindanao, a significant middle-class population, tops the national happiness index, and is recognized as one of the most business-friendly city in the Philippines.

Poverty incidence of Iloilo City (%)

Source: Philippine Statistics Authority

A resurgence began in the early 21st century, catalyzed by the opening of the Iloilo International Airport in 2007, which replaced the old Mandurriao airport. It spurred development, including Megaworld Corporation’s transformation of the decommissioned airport site into a business park. This, alongside investments from other developers in the nearby area, revitalized the economy.

The service sector dominates with an 87.7 percent GDP share, led by wholesale and retail trade (contributing 2.3 percentage points to growth), alongside banking and IT-BPO, while industry accounts for 9.9 percent and agriculture, forestry, and fishing 2.4 percent. Key industries include accommodation and food services (48.3 percent growth) and transportation and storage (18.9 percent).

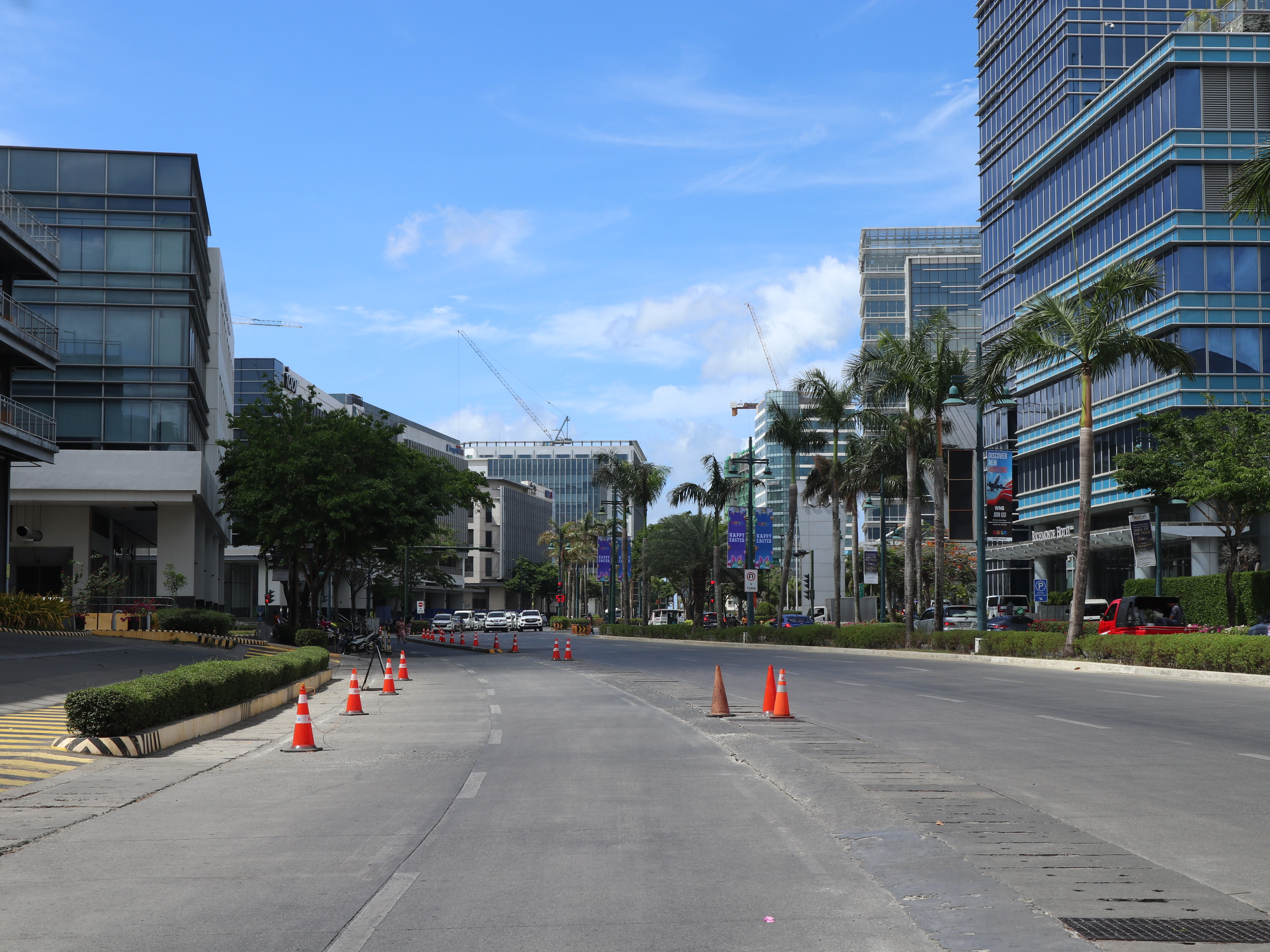
Iloilo Business Park, a key hub for IT-BPO companies, dominates the city's office property market.

The banking sector, tracing back to the Spanish-era sugar boom when Banco Español-Filipino (now Bank of the Philippine Islands) and Philippine National Bank opened their first branches outside Manila, ranks third nationally in deposits, fueled by OFW remittances, local industries, and IT-BPO growth; it hosts LifeBank MFI, the country's third-largest microfinance institution, and Queen City Development Bank, both headquartered in the city.

The IT-BPO, Shared Services, and knowledge process outsourcing (KPO) sectors are clustered in Megaworld's Iloilo Business Park and SM Investments' SM Strata Twin tower hosting firms like Transcom Asia, Carelon Global Solutions of Elevance Health, Asurion, iQOR, Medrisk, Nearsol (now CXPerts), Xtend OPS, Crawford and Co., WNS GLobal, Reed Elsevier of RELX, Stealth Monitoring (now Ecam), Atento, Connectys, Telus Digital, EXL, TTEC, Sagility, Concentrix, HGS, supported by annual IT, business, and medical graduates from universities in the city.

=== Tourism ===
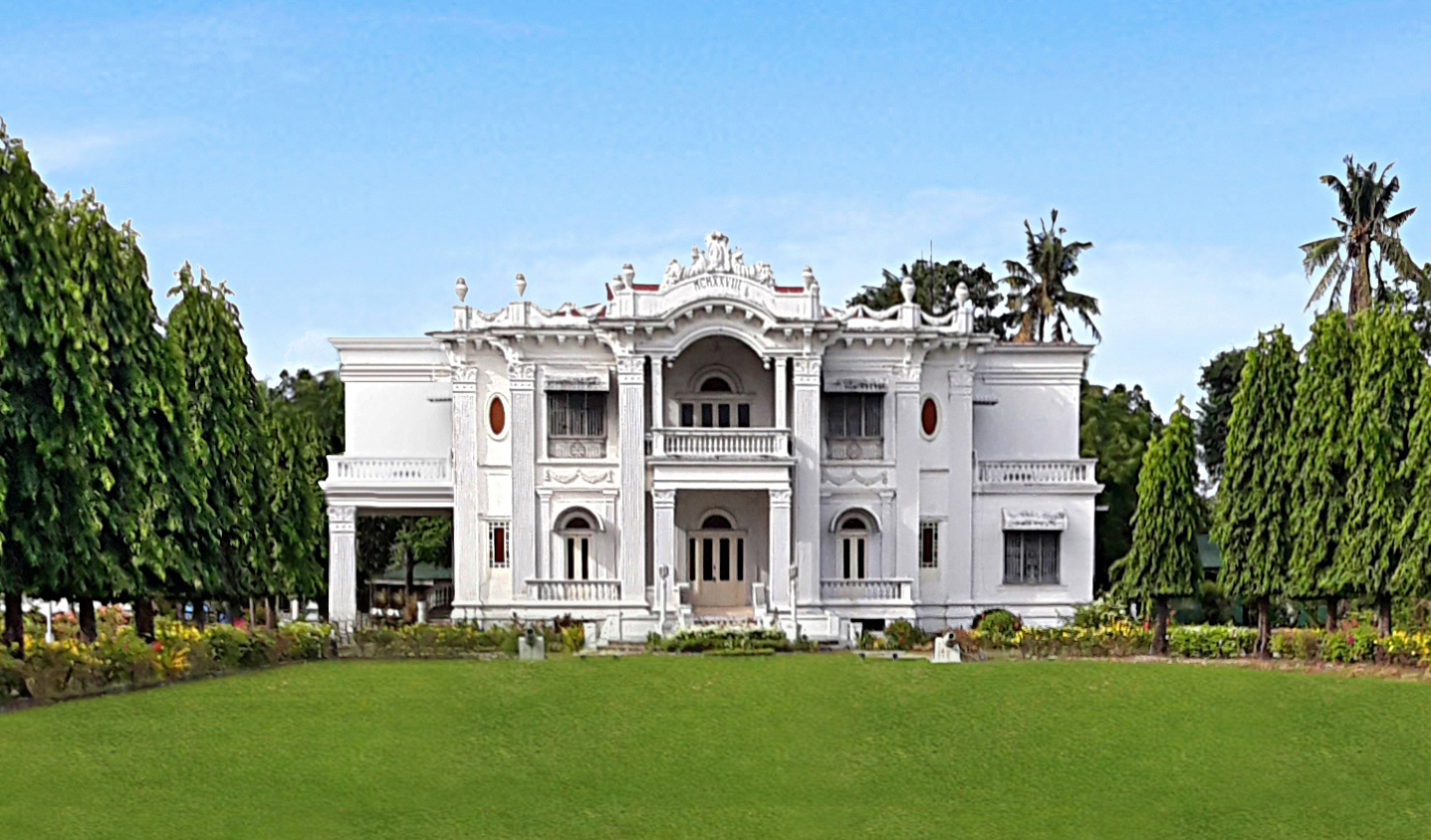
Lopez Heritage House, also known as Nelly Garden, is one of the most popular heritage mansions in Jaro, Iloilo City.

Tourism significantly boosts Iloilo's economy, with the city serving as the gateway to Western Visayas. Festivals like Dinagyang, Kasadyahan, Paraw Regatta (Asia's oldest sailing event), and the Feast of Our Lady of the Candles draw millions of visitors annually. Tourism slogans such as "Where the Past is Always Present" are coupled with the city's numerous centuries-old houses and buildings that coexist with its modern architecture. Attractions include heritage landmarks, museums, art galleries, parks, and a vibrant nightlife centered at Smallville Complex.

Iloilo's Spanish-era heritage is showcased through its centuries-old churches, historic buildings, and mansions of prominent families. The city is also a gastronomic hub which has been hailed as the country's first UNESCO Creative City of Gastronomy, is renowned for dishes like La Paz batchoy, pancit Molo, kansi, laswa, KBL (kadyos, baboy kag langka), chicken inasal, tinuom, and KMU (kadyos, manok, kag ubad).

In 2018, Iloilo recorded 1,242,087 tourist arrivals—the highest in Western Visayas—including 1,154,550 domestic visitors, 70,787 foreigners, and 16,750 overseas workers. This rose by 11.59 percent in 2019, reaching approximately 1.39 million, and hit 1.4 million in 2020 despite global challenges. In 2024, Iloilo City's tourist arrival breached a 1 million mark. A total of 1,001,028 local and foreign tourists visited the city during the said year, higher by 12.95 percent compared to 2023's 886,283 visitors.

=== Shopping and retail ===
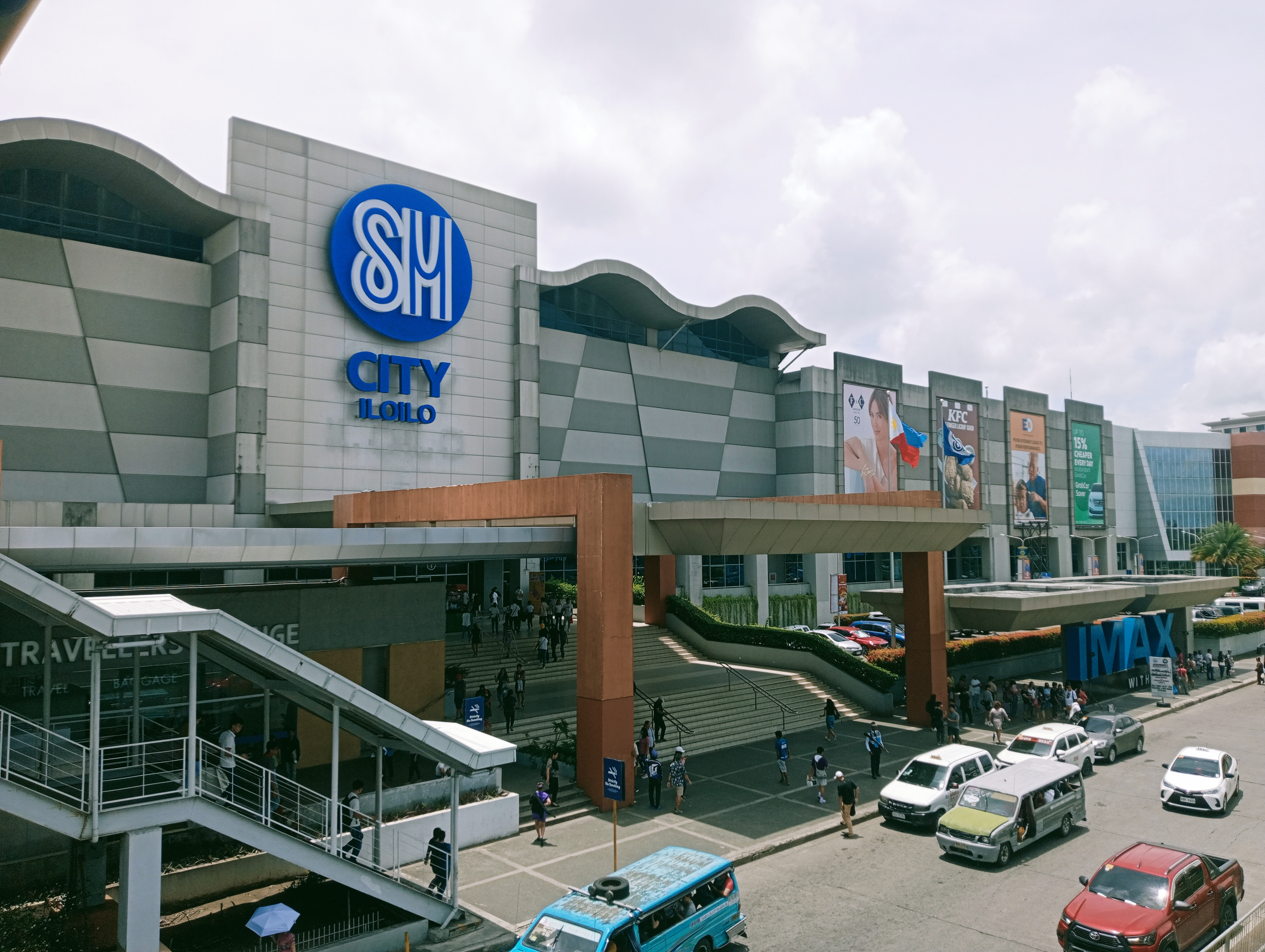
SM City Iloilo is the largest mall in the city as well as in Western Visayas.

Iloilo City is the shopping hub of Western Visayas since colonial times and has experienced a retail boom in the post-independence era. Hoskyn's Department Store, opened in 1877 on Calle Real, was the Philippines’ first department store, introducing fixed pricing and offering diverse goods from English wool to machinery. Acquired by the Que family post-World War II, it became Washington Supermart. Marymart Shopping Center opened in 1972, followed by SM Delgado in 1979—the first SM outside Manila—and The Atrium in 1993, a hotel-retail mix.

Modern malls includes SM City Iloilo, opened in 1999, which is the city's largest mall, Robinsons Iloilo, Robinsons Jaro, Gaisano Capital La Paz, Gaisano Capital Iloilo City Center, and Megaworld's Festive Walk Iloilo and Festive Walk Parade—the latter the country's longest dining strip. Additional shopping centers include CityMall Tagbak, CityMall Parola, Jaro Town Square, GT Mall Molo, City Times Square, and The Shops at Atria by Ayala Malls.

Upcoming mall developments include SM City Jaro, Sta. Lucia Mall, and Atria Gardens. Beyond the city center, malls on Iloilo City's outskirts cater to growing suburban demand. Vista Mall Iloilo, part of the 500-hectare Vista Estate township, is located in Oton. Other malls, including Robinsons Pavia, GT Plaza Pavia, and CityMall Ungka, are situated in Pavia.

== Culture ==
Culture and tradition play a significant role in shaping Iloilo City's heritage. With more than 300 years of being a Spanish colonial outpost in the far east, Ilonggo's culture is deeply shaped by Hispanic influences - from religion, cuisine, architecture, language, customs, and last names. The city which is home to numerous cultural institutions, including national museums, heritage zones, heritage houses, and mansions, Iloilo is sometimes referred to as the "museum city" and "city of mansions." Hailed as the first UNESCO Creative City of Gastronomy in the Philippines, the city is renowned for dishes like La Paz Batchoy, Kansi, Pancit Molo, Laswa, and Kadyos-Baboy-Langka. Iloilo also home to three festival it is known for: the Dinagyang Festival, Fiesta Candelaria, and Paraw Regatta Festival, which are flocked by tourists annually.

=== Museums ===
The Iloilo Museum of Contemporary Art (ILOMOCA), the first contemporary and modern art museum outside Luzon.

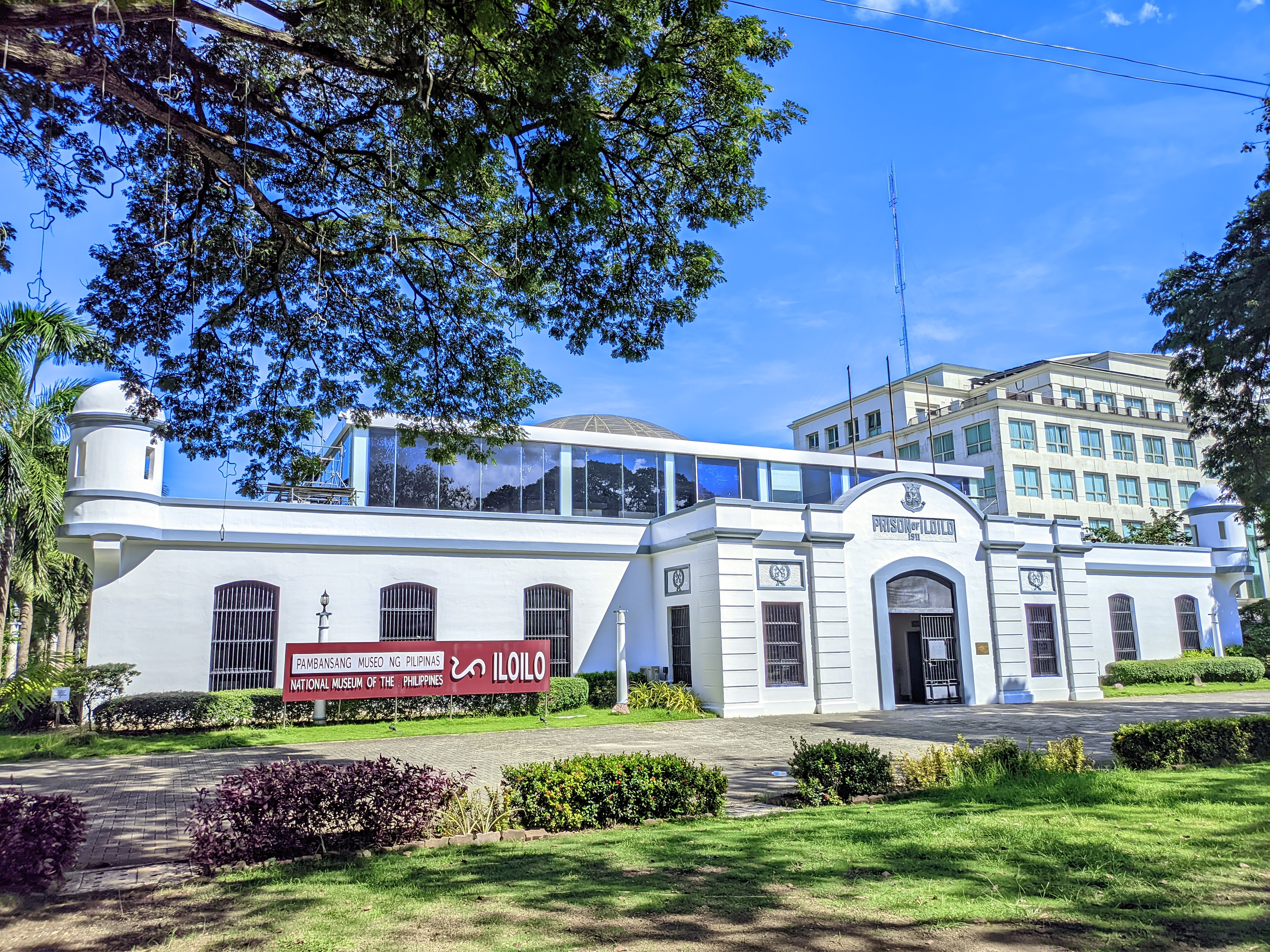
The National Museum of the Philippines – Western Visayas housed in the old Iloilo Provincial Jail turned museum.

Iloilo City hosts a wide variety of museums that cover ancient and contemporary art, cultural and economic history, and science. Artifacts predating the Spanish era—such as pottery, porcelain, gold, and plates—unearthed across Iloilo are displayed in these museums, alongside works by notable Filipino artists with roots in the region. The Western Visayas Regional Museum of the National Museum of the Philippines, housed in the restored former Iloilo Provincial Jail, showcasing artifacts from different parts of the region. Its regional headquarters is located in the refurbished old Jaro Municipal Hall. Other museums feature memorabilia of prominent figures and families, artworks, and artifacts.

Among the notable museums in Iloilo City are Museo Iloilo, the first government-built museum outside Manila, and the Museum of Philippine Economic History, housed in a restored building once owned by Ynchausti y Compania. The museum narrates the evolution of the Philippine economy and features 13 galleries with artifacts such as looms from Miag-ao, T’nalak from Mindanao, and gold accessories from Pampanga.

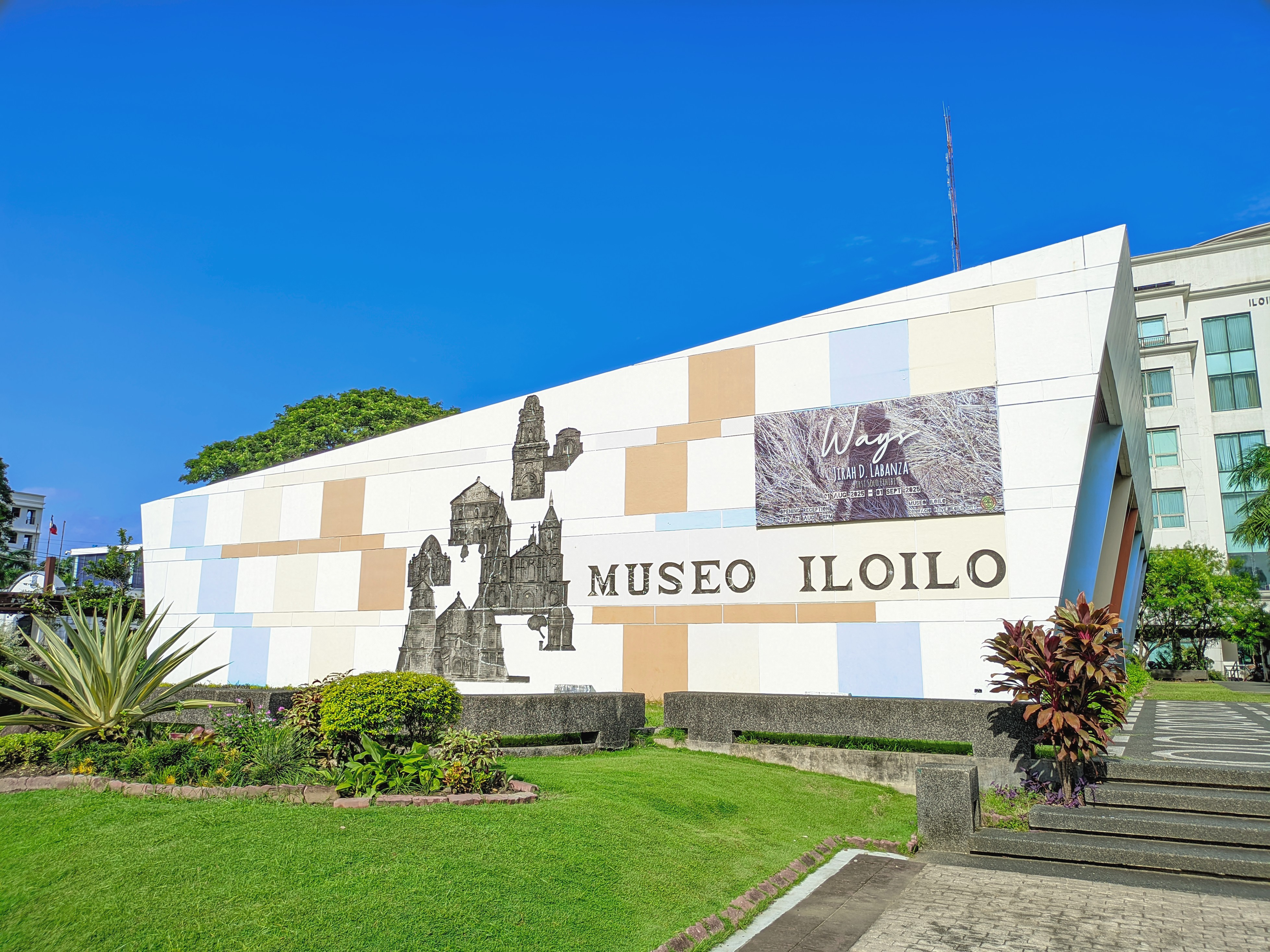
Museo Iloilo is the first provincial museum outside Metro Manila.

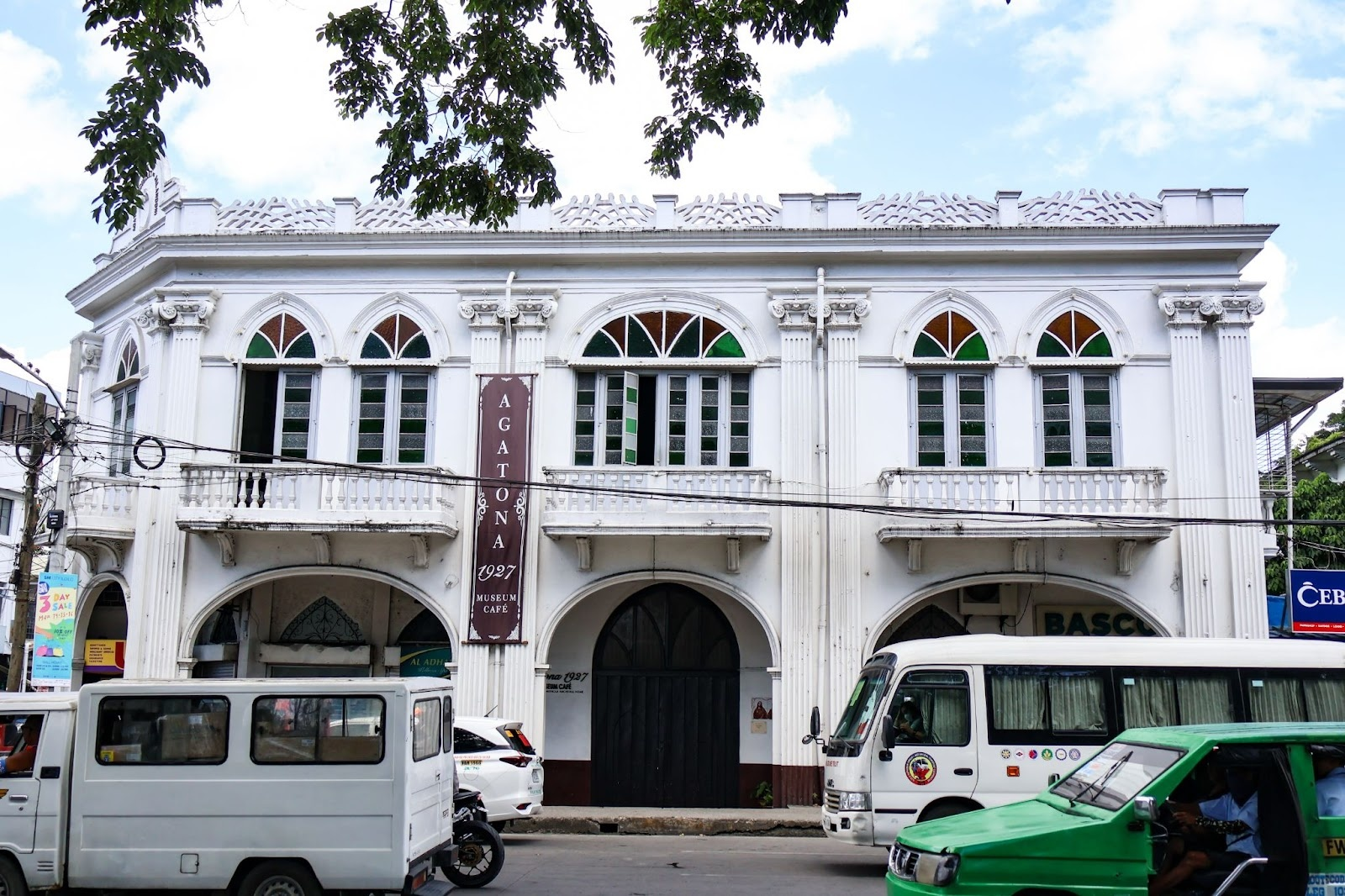
Agatona 1927 Museum Cafe in Jaro, Iloilo.

The Museum of Philippine Maritime History, located at the Iloilo Customs House, showcases the history of maritime trade in the Philippines. The Iloilo Museum of Contemporary Art (ILOMOCA) at Casa de Emperador in Iloilo Business Park is Megaworld Corporation’s first museum project and the first in Visayas and Mindanao dedicated to modern and contemporary art.

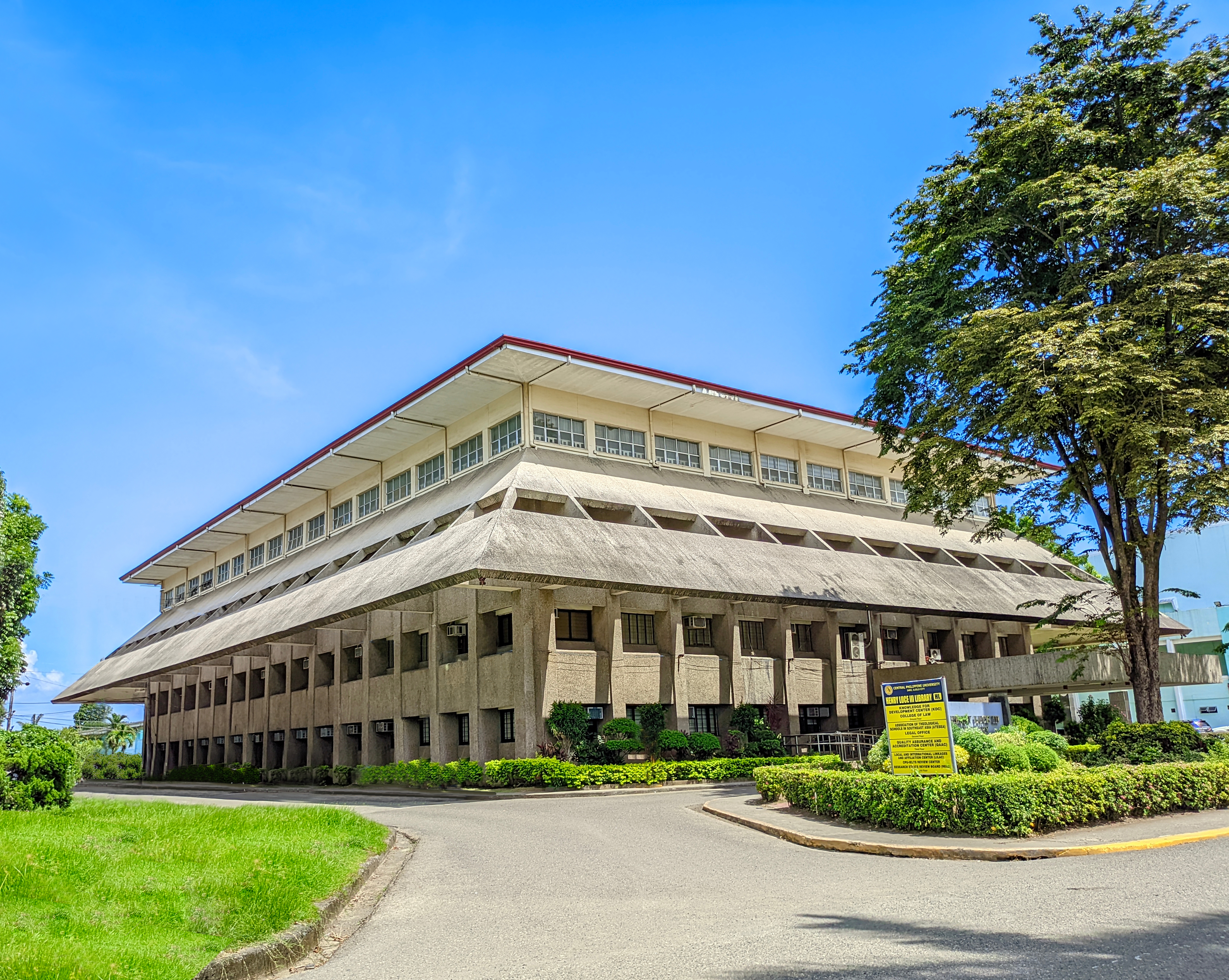
The Henry Luce III Library of Central Philippine University houses special collections like the Hinilawod Epic Chant Recordings, a UNESCO Memory of the World Register inscribed documentary heritage.

It includes five exhibit rooms, such as The Hulot Exhibit, featuring works by local and international artists like Salvador Dalí, Marc Chagall, and Joan Miró.

Other significant institutions include the Henry Luce III Museum and Library at Central Philippine University, which houses the region’s largest library and collections like the Meyer Asian Collection, Second World War documents, and UNESCO-inscribed Hinilawod Epic Chant recordings. Other museums located within universities include the University of San Agustin Museum, UPV Art Gallery, John B. Lacson Foundation Museum of Maritime Culture and Craft, and Rosendo Mejica Museum.

Heritage house museums, such as Camiña Balay Nga Bato, a 19th-century ancestral home in Arevalo, and Casa Mariquit, Iloilo’s oldest-existing heritage house in Jaro, are preserved ancestral houses. Other unique museums include the Agatona 1927 Museum Café, a heritage mansion transformed into a museum café, and the Brandy Museum, the first and only museum in the Philippines dedicated to brandy, showcasing the histories of five brands under Emperador, Inc. Science XPdition Iloilo, located at the Festive Walk Mall, is Iloilo City's first museum focused entirely on science and interactive learning.

=== Festivals ===
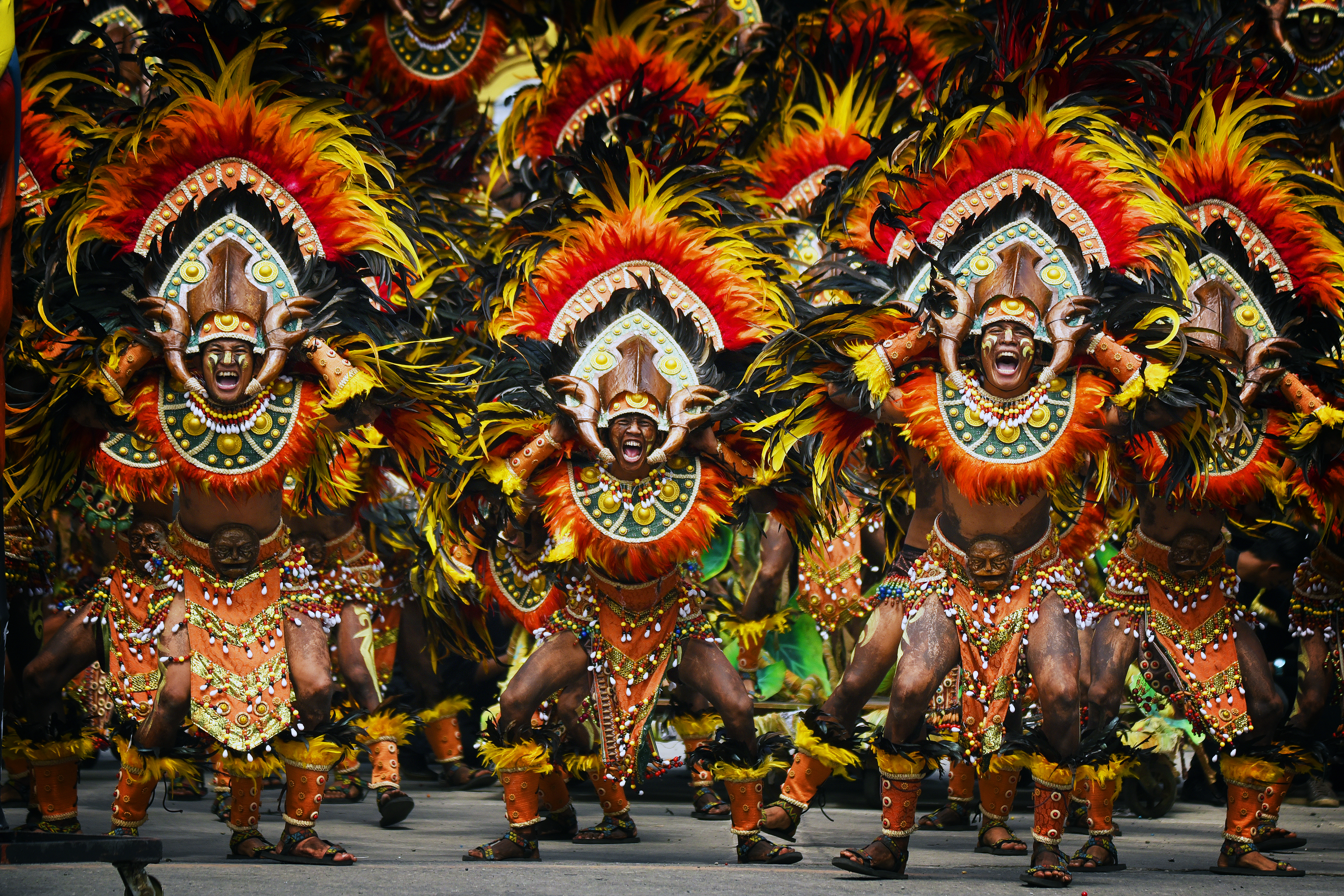
Dinagyang, one of the largest festivals in the Philippines.

Iloilo’s cultural celebrations are deeply influenced by Hispanic traditions and are sometimes referred to as the "festival capital" in the Philippines. The Dinagyang Festival, held every fourth Sunday of January, honors the Santo Niño de Cebu, is one of the largest and most popular festivals in the Philippines, while the Kasadyahan Festival, the preceding Saturday, features a competition of regional festivals.

The Jaro Fiesta or the Feast of Our Lady of the Candles, held February 2, is the largest Marian festival outside Luzon, honoring the Virgin of Candelaria, patron of Western Visayas, Negros Occidental, and Romblon, with pageantry, a carnival queen from wealthy Spanish-Filipino families, cockfighting at Iloilo Coliseum, and an agro-industrial fair at Jaro Plaza. The Iloilo Chinese Lunar New Year, celebrating the city's centuries-old Chinese community, is the largest such celebration outside Manila's Binondo, rooted in Molo’s history as the second-oldest Chinatown after Binondo.

The Festival of Lights and Music at Central Philippine University, the region’s longest-running university-based Christmas festival since 1991, illuminates its 24-hectare (59-acre) Jaro campus from December to January 6 with lights, carnival rides, and bazaars. The Paraw Regatta in February, Asia’s oldest traditional sailing event, includes competitions and festivities in Arevalo. Recent additions like the Iloilo Summer Arts Festival (April–May since 2020) and the Iloilo Arts Festival (December since 2021) highlight Ilonggo visual and performing arts.

=== Arts ===
Iloilo’s local government promotes the city as the "art capital" by transforming public spaces into canvases for murals and paintings depicting its history and culture, with support from local artists and real estate developers. A notable example is the 3D mural of Dinagyang warriors at Iloilo River Esplanade.

=== Entertainment ===
Iloilo Convention Center in Iloilo Business Park

Teatro Malhabour, recognized as the first cinema or movie house outside Manila, opened in July 1908, in Iloilo. The city also houses other prominent cinema houses including Cine Palace, the oldest still-existing and operating movie theater in Iloilo, and the now-defunct Cine Eagle, both built in 1928 and located on Calle Real. Modern cinemas in the city screen a wide array of present-day films, both national and international. The Film Development Council of the Philippines has also established a cinematheque theater in the city.

The annual Iloilo Film Festival, held during Dinagyang, features a plethora of films screened during the festival. The Iloilo Convention Center is hosting international and local musical, band, and solo performances or concerts. The Rose Memorial Auditorium at Central Philippine University, the region's largest theater, hosts events like the Bombo Music Festival and is designated as a Cultural Center of the Philippines Regional Art Center.

Universities in Iloilo have established cultural and art groups gaining recognition for performances held nationally and internationally, some of which are sponsored by national cultural government agencies. The University of San Agustin has established the USA Troubadours, while Central Philippine University is home to the CPU Bahandi Singers, the CPU Handbell Choir (the first 8-octave handbell choir in the Philippines), and the CPU Sari-Saot Dance Troupe.

=== Cuisine ===
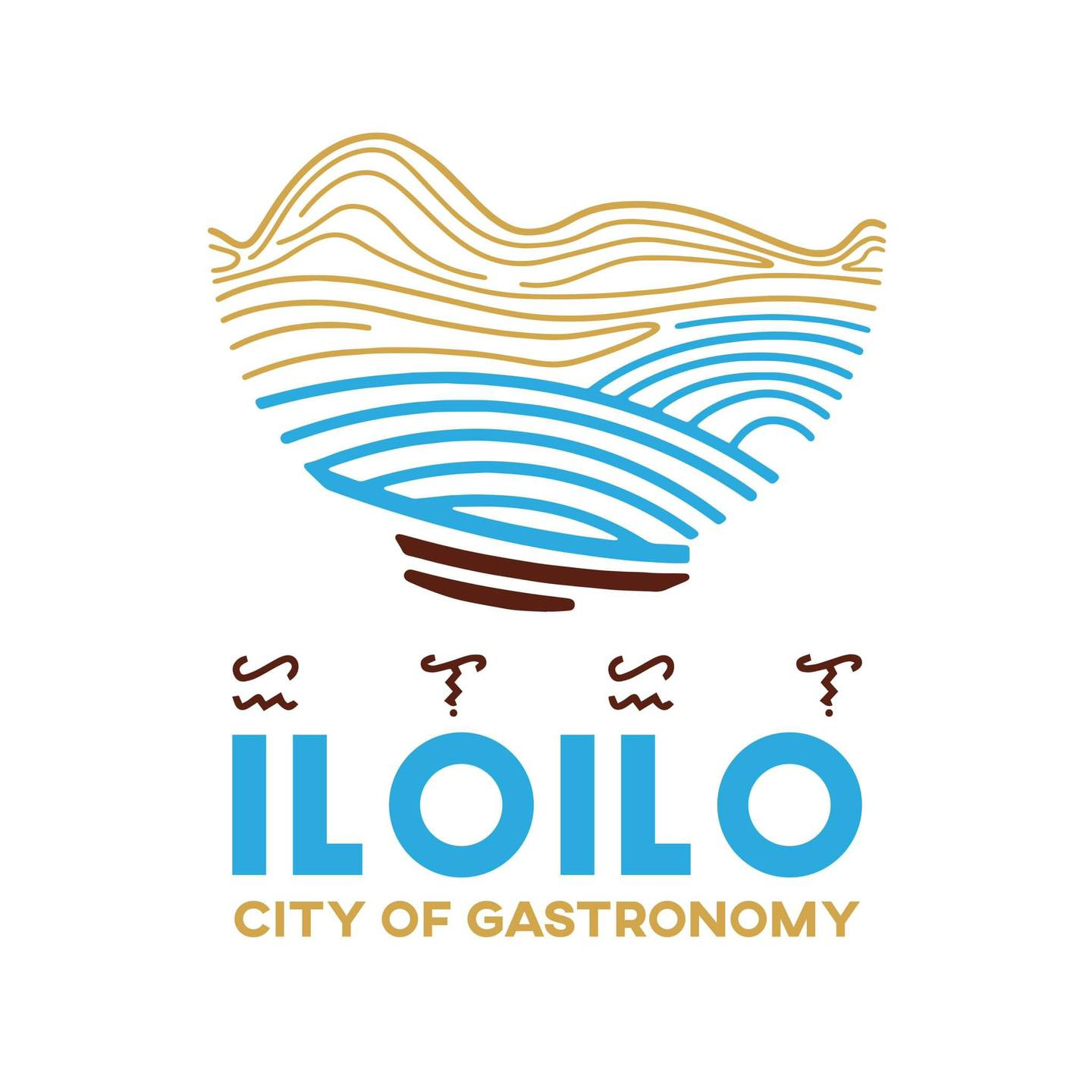
The official logo of Iloilo City for UNESCO Creative City of Gastronomy

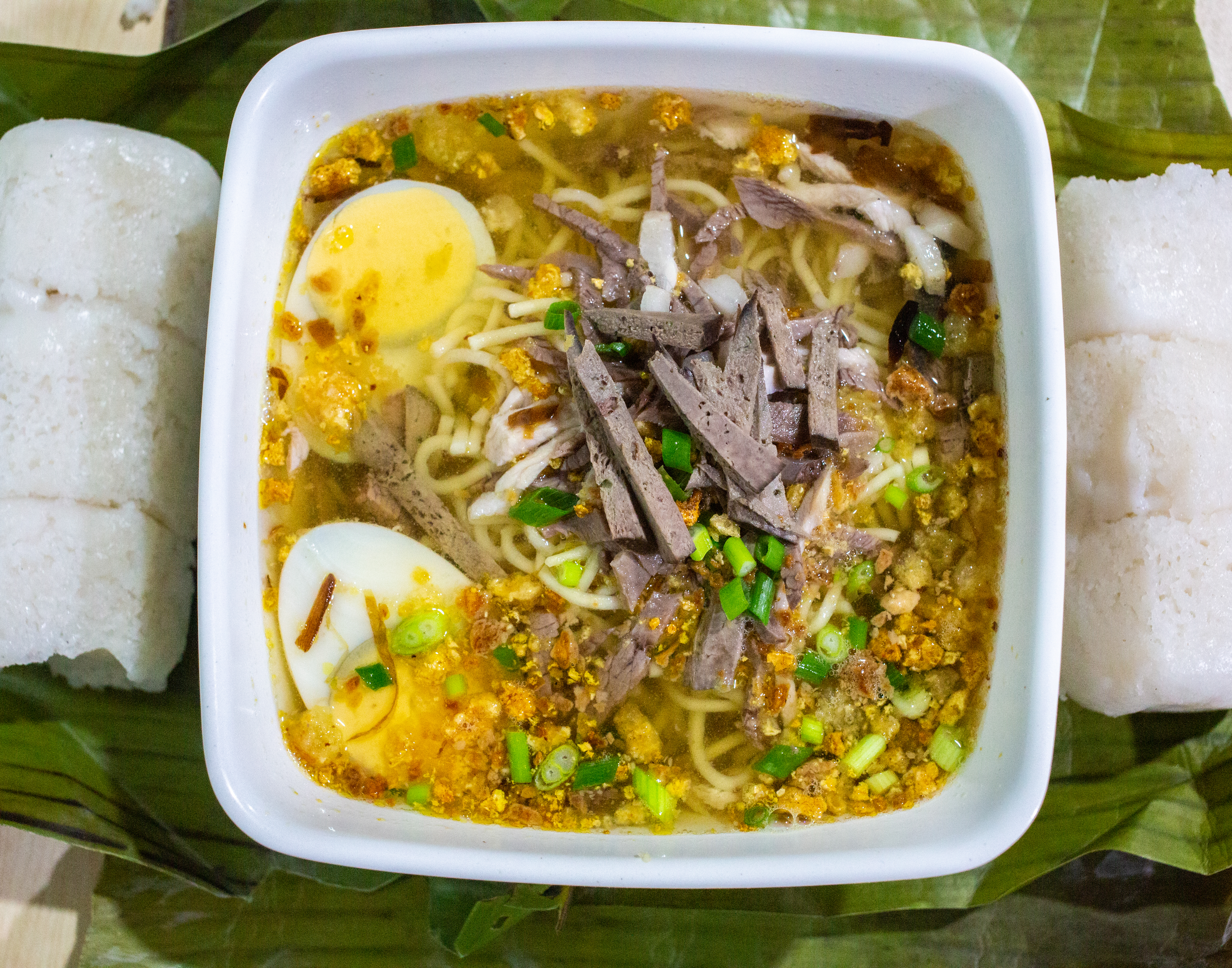
A bowl of La Paz Batchoy

Iloilo City is recognized as a UNESCO Creative City of Gastronomy and is widely regarded as the "Food Haven of the Philippines." Its cuisine has Eastern and Western influences, shaped by the city's central location and its historical role as a major port. Over three centuries of Spanish colonization have deeply influenced Ilonggo cuisine, introducing dishes shared with other Hispanic-influenced countries, such as menudo, afritada, lechon, adobo, and estofadong baboy. Rooted in Asian traditions, rice remains a staple, typically served plain alongside these dishes. The city is renowned for dishes like La Paz batchoy, pancit Molo, kansi, KBL (kadyos, baboy kag langka), KMU (kadyos, manok kag ubad), chicken inasal, tinuom, and laswa.

A diverse range of restaurants in Iloilo also offers international cuisines, such as Italian, American, Japanese, Chinese, Vietnamese, German, and Thai, while the growth of luxury hotels has introduced high-end buffets and exclusive dining experiences. Iloilo City is also the birthplace of Mang Inasal, the country's first fast-food chain serving chicken inasal, founded in 2003 by Edgar Sia. From its origins in Iloilo, Mang Inasal has expanded nationwide.

Spanish influence also introduced baking traditions to Iloilo, leading to the establishment of historic bakeries still operating today, including Panaderia ni Paa, established in the 1900s, and Deocampo: The Original Barquillos, founded in the 1800s, both located in Jaro, as well as Panaderia de Molo, also founded in the 1800s, in Molo. The bakeries are known for sweet delicacies such as barquillos, thin rolled cookies, and biscocho, hardened baked bread slices coated with milk and margarine.

=== Sports ===
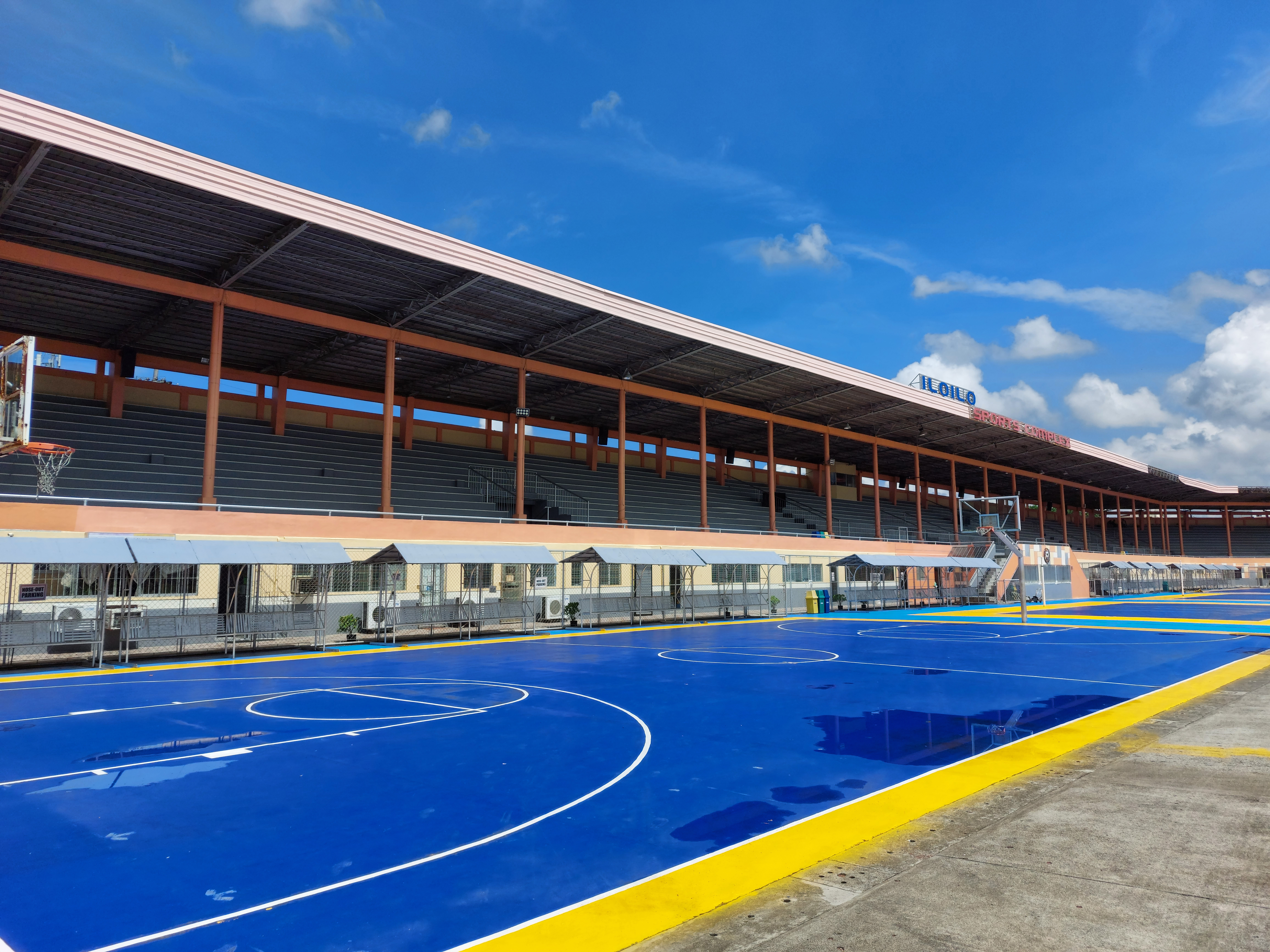
The grandstand and basketball court at the Iloilo Sports Complex.

The Iloilo City Sports Office oversees sports activities in Iloilo City, organizing competitions among its seven districts. The Iloilo City Inter-District Basketball Tournament includes teams from Arevalo, Molo, Mandurriao, City Proper, La Paz, Jaro, and Lapuz. The Iloilo City Basketball Club (ICBC) organizes basketball for organizations and companies in the city. The Iloilo Sports Complex in La Paz has a 7,000-seat stadium, an Olympic-size swimming pool, a running track, a football field, and courts for volleyball, basketball, tennis, and badminton, with an indoor gymnasium. The Iloilo City Sports Center at Jalandoni Memorial National High School in Lapuz, began development in 2021 for the Iloilo City Sports Academy.

Iloilo City has three professional sports teams. Kaya F.C.–Iloilo competes in the Philippines Football League (PFL), AFC Champions League, and AFC Cup, using the Iloilo Sports Complex as its home venue. D'Navigators Iloilo competes in the Spikers' Turf. Kaya Women's Futbol competes in the PFF Women's League.

=== Media ===
Iloilo City's media include English tabloids like Panay News, The Daily Guardian, News Express, and Sunstar Iloilo, with Hublas of Panay News as the sole Hiligaynon tabloid, and Cream Magazine, a glossy lifestyle publication since 1989. Bombo Radyo Philippines, one of the largest radio network stations, was founded in Iloilo City in 1966.

Television began with DYAF-TV in 1964, evolving into ABS-CBN’s TV Patrol Panay on Channel 10 by 1998. GMA’s TV-6 Iloilo (now Channel 7) started in 1967, upgrading in 1998. Other stations include PTV (1992), IBC (1977), GMA News TV (2010), and TV5 Iloilo (2012). RMN’s BEAM TV 26, relaunched in 2010, with digital broadcasting in 2012.

== Government ==
Iloilo City Hall is the seat of city government

Iloilo City serves as both the regional capital of Western Visayas and the provincial capital of Iloilo Province, functioning as a key economic center in the Philippines. Classified as a first-income-class, highly urbanized city (HUC), it hosts regional and provincial offices of national government agencies and operates independently from the province of Iloilo, meaning its residents cannot vote for provincial officials.

The city is governed by the Mayor of Iloilo City, the chief executive, assisted by a vice mayor, and represented by a lone congressman in the House of Representatives. The Iloilo City Council, a 15-member legislative body, is elected during general elections alongside the mayor and vice mayor, convening monthly at Iloilo City Hall in sessions open to the public, with decisions typically prepared by various boards and committees. The city is subdivided into 180 barangays, each led by a barangay captain elected in national barangay elections.

Each of the city's seven districts has a district president elected from among its barangay captains for the Association of Barangay Captains (ABC). In 1955, Rodolfo Ganzon became the first popularly elected mayor, notable for authoring the Iloilo City Freedom Law, which restored residents’ rights to elect their mayor, vice mayor, and 10 councilors across the seven districts.

City Government of Iloilo
Mayor
Raisa Maria Lourdes S. Treñas-Chu (NUP)	
Vice Mayor
Lady Julie Grace L. Baronda (Lakas)	
Sangguniang Panglungsod Members
Sedfrey L. Cabaluna (NUP)	Mandrie T. Malabor (NUP)
Jose Maria Miguel S. Treñas (PFP)	Johnny Y. Young (PFP)
Rex Marcus B. Sarabia (NUP)	Romel D. Duron (PFP)
Alan A. Zaldivar (PFP)	Rudolph Jeffrey O. Ganzon (NUP)
Lyndon V. Acap (NUP)	Sheen Marie S. Mabilog (Lakas)
Jose Maria B. Dela Llana (PFP)	Frances Graces V. Parcon-Torres (PFP)
ABC Presidents
Jaro – Rodel Mamon	Mandurriao – Ariel Mirar
La Paz – Ruby Ann Geanga	Molo – Lee Quimsing
City Proper – Madonna Martin	Lapuz – Arniel Asturias
Arevalo – Rico Francis Acap	
SK Federation President
Jelma Crystel Implica

== Infrastructure ==
=== Transportation ===
==== Land ====
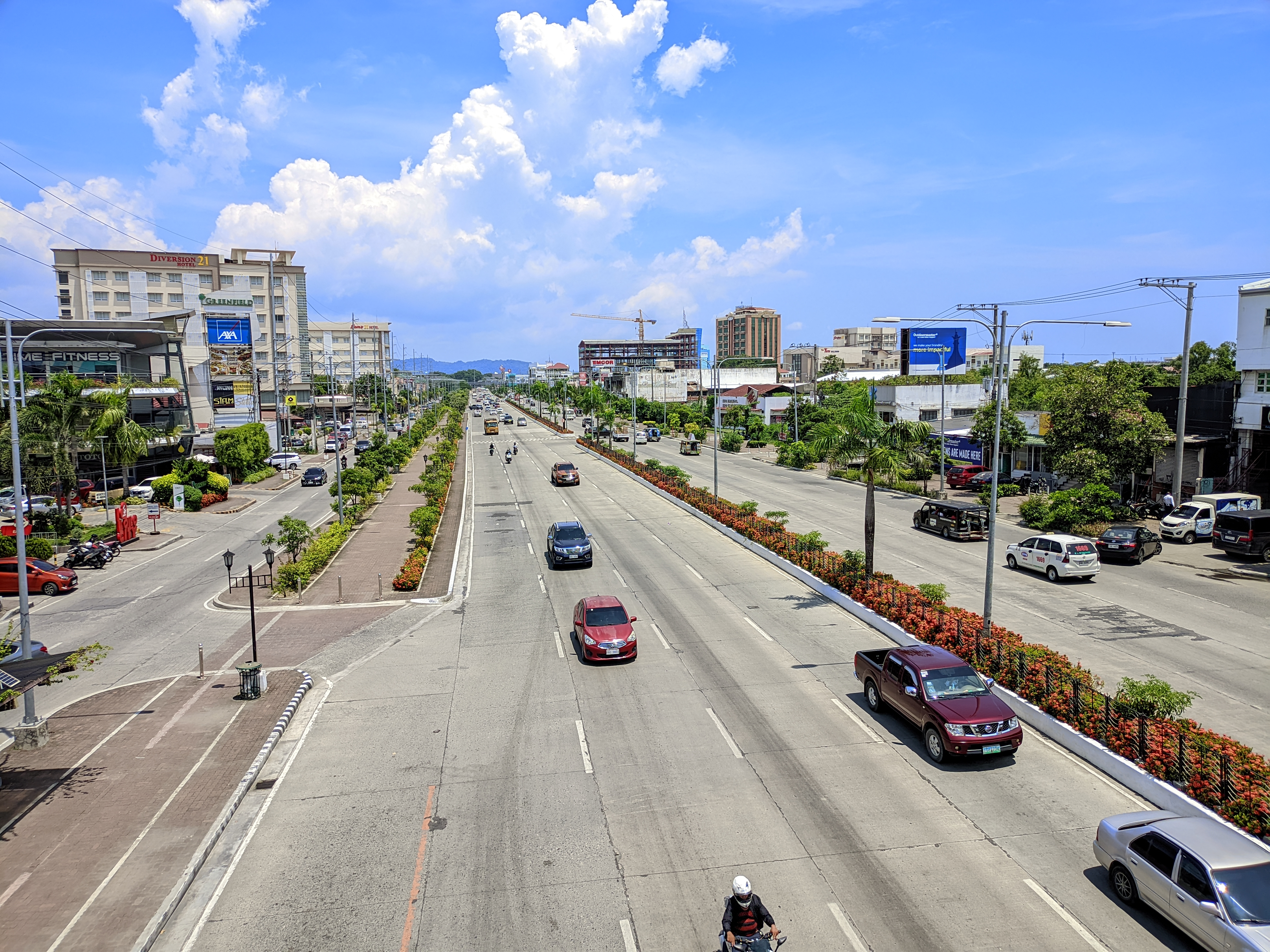
Benigno S. Aquino Jr. Avenue, a major thoroughfare in the city.

Major roads in Iloilo City include Benigno S. Aquino Jr. Avenue (Diversion Road), McArthur Drive, General Luna Street, Avanceña Street, E. Lopez Street, Pres. Corazon C. Aquino Avenue (Circumferential Road 1), Iznart Street, and Muelle Loney Street. Benigno S. Aquino Jr. Avenue, an eight-lane main road with a protected bike lane and two-lane service road, connects Iloilo City to Pavia, Santa Barbara, and Iloilo International Airport. Passenger jeepneys—distinctive for their sleek, sedan-like "passad" design—white metered taxis, and tricycles dominate city travel.

Jeepneys serve fixed routes on major and secondary roads and tricycles cover community streets. Large passad jeepneys, buses, and mini-shuttle vans link Iloilo City to the broader province, Panay, and beyond via roll-on, roll-off (RO-RO) ferry services of the Strong Republic Nautical Highway, reaching Metro Manila, Mindoro, Batangas, Cebu, Negros and Mindanao.

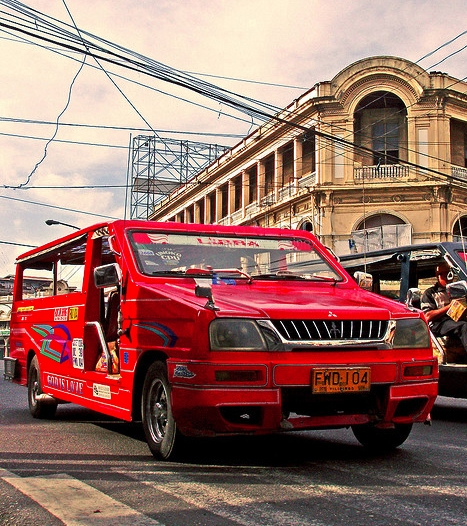
Passad jeepneys in Iloilo City.

Iloilo City is among the first cities to adopt mini-bus-like modern public utility jeepneys (PUJs) in contrast to the national phase-out of older jeepneys under President Rodrigo Duterte’s administration. In March 2019, the Land Transportation Franchising and Regulatory Board (LTFRB) launched a Premium Point-to-Point (P2P) Bus Service, offering express routes to airports in Cabatuan, Kalibo, and Caticlan (Boracay). A bus rapid transit (BRT) system is also being proposed for travel between Iloilo City and the international airport, as well as other parts in the metropolitan area.

There are six integrated transport system (ITS) terminals in the city: the Iloilo North ITS Terminal (North Ceres Bus Terminal) in Tagbak, Jaro, serves northwestern Iloilo, Passi City, and northwestern Panay (Capiz, Aklan, Boracay). The Iloilo Central Line ITS Terminal (Pavia People's Terminal) in Ungka, Jaro, connects central Iloilo. The Aleosan ITS Terminal in Hibao-an, Mandurriao, links upland areas like San Miguel, Alimodian, and Leon, including Bucari.

The Iloilo South ITS Terminal (South Ceres Bus Terminal) in Mohon, Arevalo, covers southern Iloilo and Antique. The Iloilo North Coast ITS Terminal in Ticud, La Paz, reaches northern coastal towns like Carles, Sicogon Island, Islas de Gigantes. The Festive Walk Transport Hub in Mandurriao, within Iloilo Business Park, provides a modern transit point for passengers within the city and nearby areas.

Iloilo City is widely known as the "Bicycling Capital of the Philippines" through the collaborative efforts of local and national governments, as well as stakeholders, to promote bike-friendly infrastructure. The city boasts nearly 100 kilometres (62 mi) of bicycle lanes, with the longest along Diversion Road. Most sections of the Iloilo River Esplanade also serve as dedicated bicycle lanes. In 2019, the Dutch government partnered with Iloilo City to improve its cycling infrastructure.

==== Air ====
The Iloilo International Airport terminal building

Iloilo International Airport, the fourth-busiest in the Philippines, is the major airport serving Iloilo City. It is 19 kilometres (12 miles) northwest of the city in Cabatuan on a 188 hectares (460 acres) site. It was opened to commercial traffic in June 2007, replacing the old Iloilo Airport in Mandurriao. The new airport inherited its IATA and ICAO airport codes. It is linked to the city through Benigno S. Aquino Jr. Avenue and served by metered taxis, airport shuttle vans, multicabs, and P2P buses. The privatization of the airport is in the pipeline, with Filipino billionaire Manny Villar’s Prime Asset Venture Incorporated (PAVI) as the proponent with the largest proposed budget at ₱20 billion.

==== Sea ====
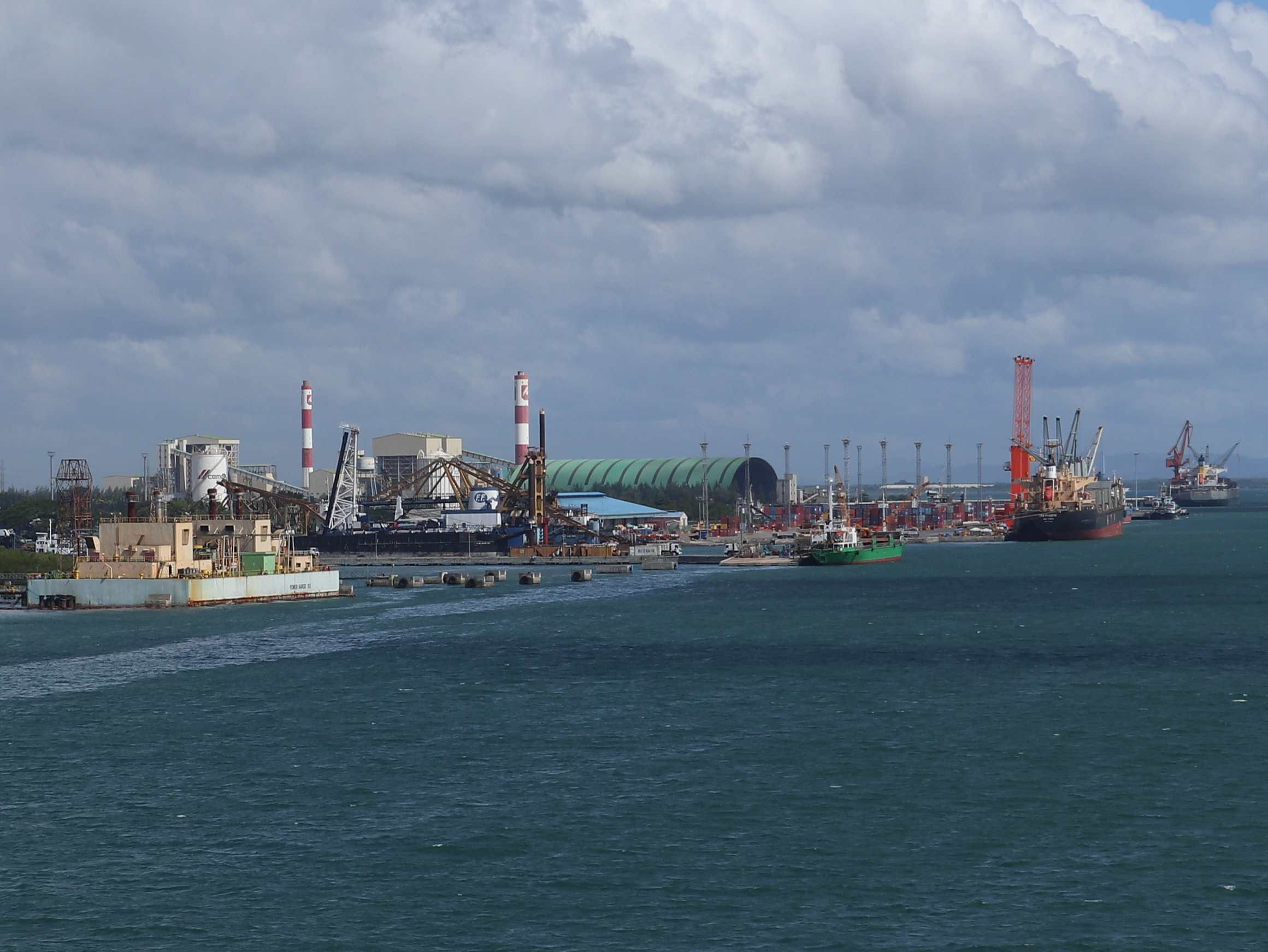
The Visayas Container Terminal, formerly known as Iloilo Commercial Port Complex

The Port of Iloilo, a primary seaport in the central Philippines, is located on Panay's south coast along the Panay Gulf. It comprises several major facilities, including the Iloilo Commercial Port Complex (ICPC), which occupies 20.8 hectares of reclaimed land. In 2024, International Container Terminal Services, Inc. (ICTSI) secured a 25-year deal to develop and manage the ICPC, renaming it the Visayas Container Terminal (VCT).

The Iloilo Domestic Port Complex (IDPC), near Fort San Pedro, handles ferries to other islands. Muelle Loney, opened in 1855, now accommodates smaller ships and fast ferries to nearby islands. The Port of Iloilo ranks third in ship visits (11,853), fourth in cargo volume (491,719 million metric tons), and fourth in passenger traffic (2.4 million) annually.

The ferry port in Parola, City Proper, uses small boats to connect to Guimaras. Roll-on, roll-off (RO-RO) ferries also serve nearby islands. The Iloilo Fish Port Complex (IFPC) in City Proper, spanning 21 hectares, is the main fish trading hub in the Visayas, supplying stores, hotels, and markets locally and internationally. In March 2022, it received ₱570 million to develop a fish plant, canning area, and new energy source.

==== Rail ====
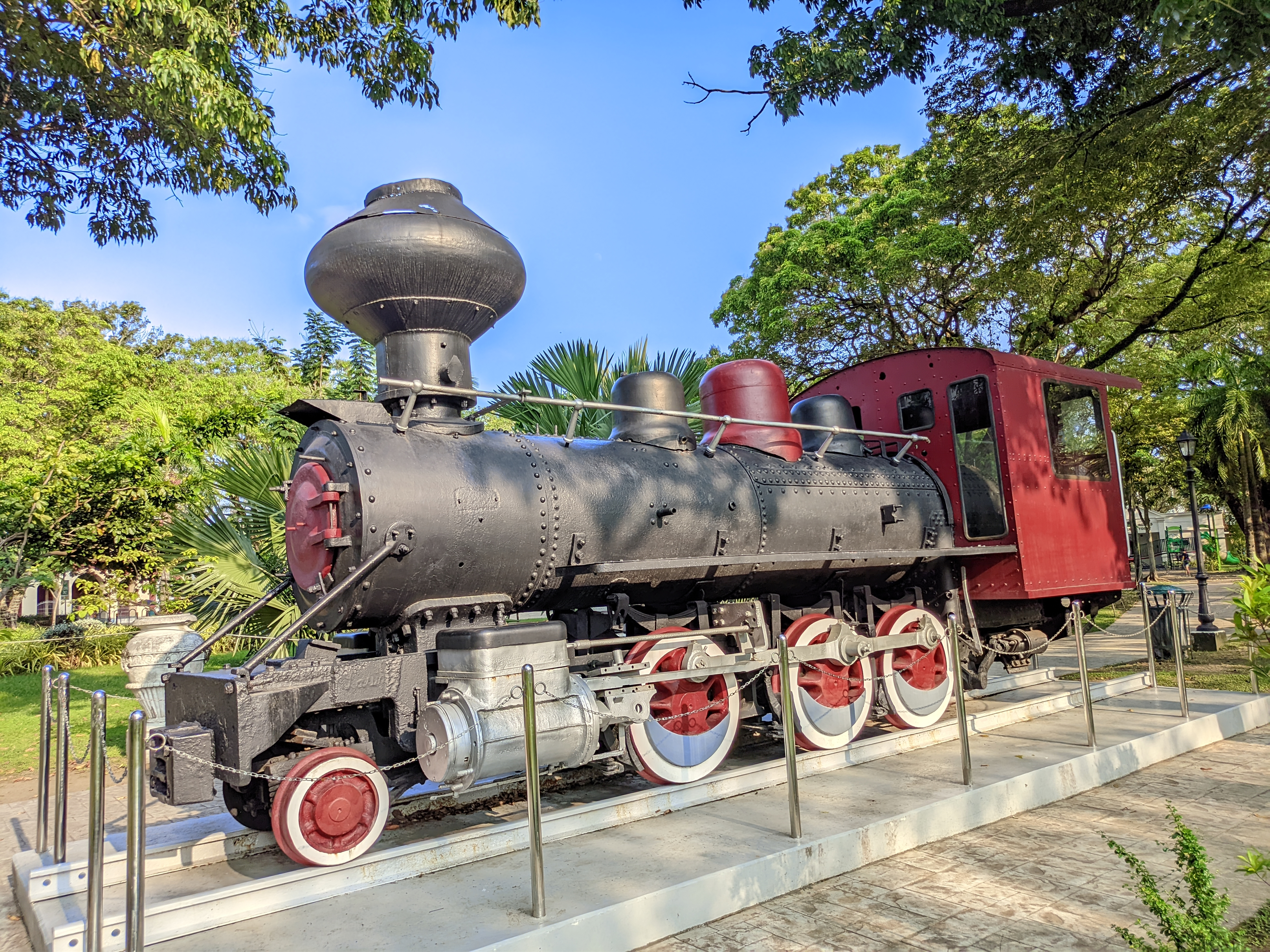
Old Train of Panay Railways displayed in Plaza Libertad of Iloilo City.

The railway system on the island of Panay, operated by Panay Railways, originally ran from Muelle Loney Wharf along the Iloilo River to Roxas City in Capiz. It operated for nearly 80 years, beginning in 1907, but ceased operations in the 1980s due to mounting losses and cash flow problems. Since its closure, there have been multiple proposals to revive the railway system. In 2022, Panay Railways announced its openness to foreign ownership as part of efforts to reconstruct its former train lines. The proposed revival aims to reconnect major cities in Panay, including Iloilo City, Roxas City, and potentially extend the system to Caticlan (Boracay) in Malay, Aklan.

=== Utilities ===
Iloilo City gets its power from two big plants in Ingore, La Paz. The Panay Power Corporation runs a 72 megawatts (MW) diesel fuel power plant. The Panay Energy Development Corporation (PEDC) runs a 164 MW coal power plant. PEDC plans for a third coal plant to the existing 164 MW setup, which will make an extra 150 MW, bringing the total to 404 MW for Panay and Guimaras islands.

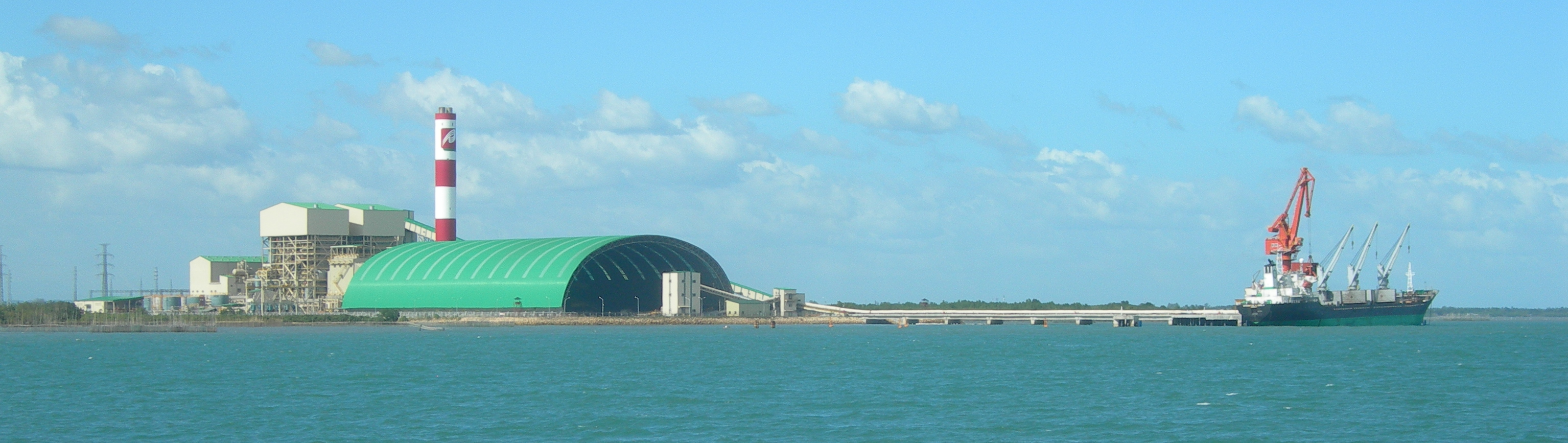
Panay Energy and Development Corporation's coal-fired power plant in Ingore, La Paz

The Panay Electric Company (PECO) handled power distribution in Iloilo City since 1923, making it one of the oldest private electric power companies in the Philippines. In 2019, MORE Electric and Power Corporation (MORE Power), owned by Spanish-Filipino billionaire Enrique K. Razon became the new sole power distribution company in the city. Since then, it introduced modern power services in the city, including the installation of an underground cabling system.

Metro Pacific Iloilo Water (MPIW) is the city's sole water supplier. It was established as a joint venture of Metro Pacific Water (MPW) and Metro Iloilo Water District (MIWD) to improve clean water supply for Iloilo City and as well as the whole Iloilo metropolitan area. In 2025, MPW began construction of the Iloilo Desalination Plant, which is set to become the largest desalination facility in the Philippines. The city has also begun constructing a new integrated solid waste management facility in Ingore, La Paz as the sanitary landfill in Calahunan, Mandurriao, which has served Iloilo City for years, is nearing the end of its lifespan and is expected to reach full capacity by 2026.

== Healthcare ==
Healthway QualiMed Hospital Iloilo, one of the most modern private hospitals in the city

The Iloilo City Health Office, in collaboration with the Department of Health (DOH), oversees the planning and implementation of city government healthcare programs, including free immunizations for children targeting seven major diseases: smallpox, diphtheria, tetanus, yellow fever, whooping cough, polio, and measles. The city operates health centers in its barangays under the City Health Office's supervision.

Three government-run hospitals serve the city: West Visayas State University Medical Center (WVSUMC), Western Visayas Medical Center (WVMC), and the under-construction Iloilo City Hospital (ICH). Some of the private and church-affiliated hospitals in the city are Iloilo Mission Hospital (IMH) and St. Paul's Hospital Iloilo (SPH Iloilo), both are heritage healthcare institutions.

Other private facilities include The Medical City-Iloilo (TMC Iloilo), Healthway QualiMed Hospital Iloilo (HQHI), Metro Iloilo Hospital and Medical Center (MIHMC), Medicus Medical Center (MMC), Iloilo Doctors’ Hospital (IDH), Medicus Cancer Institute (MCI), Asia Pacific Medical Center–Iloilo (APMC Iloilo), Seamen's AMEOSUP Hospital, and the under-construction Supercare Medical Services/Center. Notable maternity centers include the La Paz Maternity and Reproductive Health Center (LMRHC) and CPU Birthing Center.

The Iloilo City Government has introduced an ordinance to position the city as a medical tourism hub. Iloilo has already drawn international patients for follow-up consultations. Local plastic surgeons have also started expanding into aesthetic procedures, though much of their practice remains focused on reconstructive surgeries for conditions such as burns, cleft lips, and palates. Western Visayas region as a whole also continues to strengthen its position as a preferred destination for healthcare technology service providers. In July 2025, the first-ever awake brain surgery in the region was successfully performed at Western Visayas Medical Center.

== Education ==
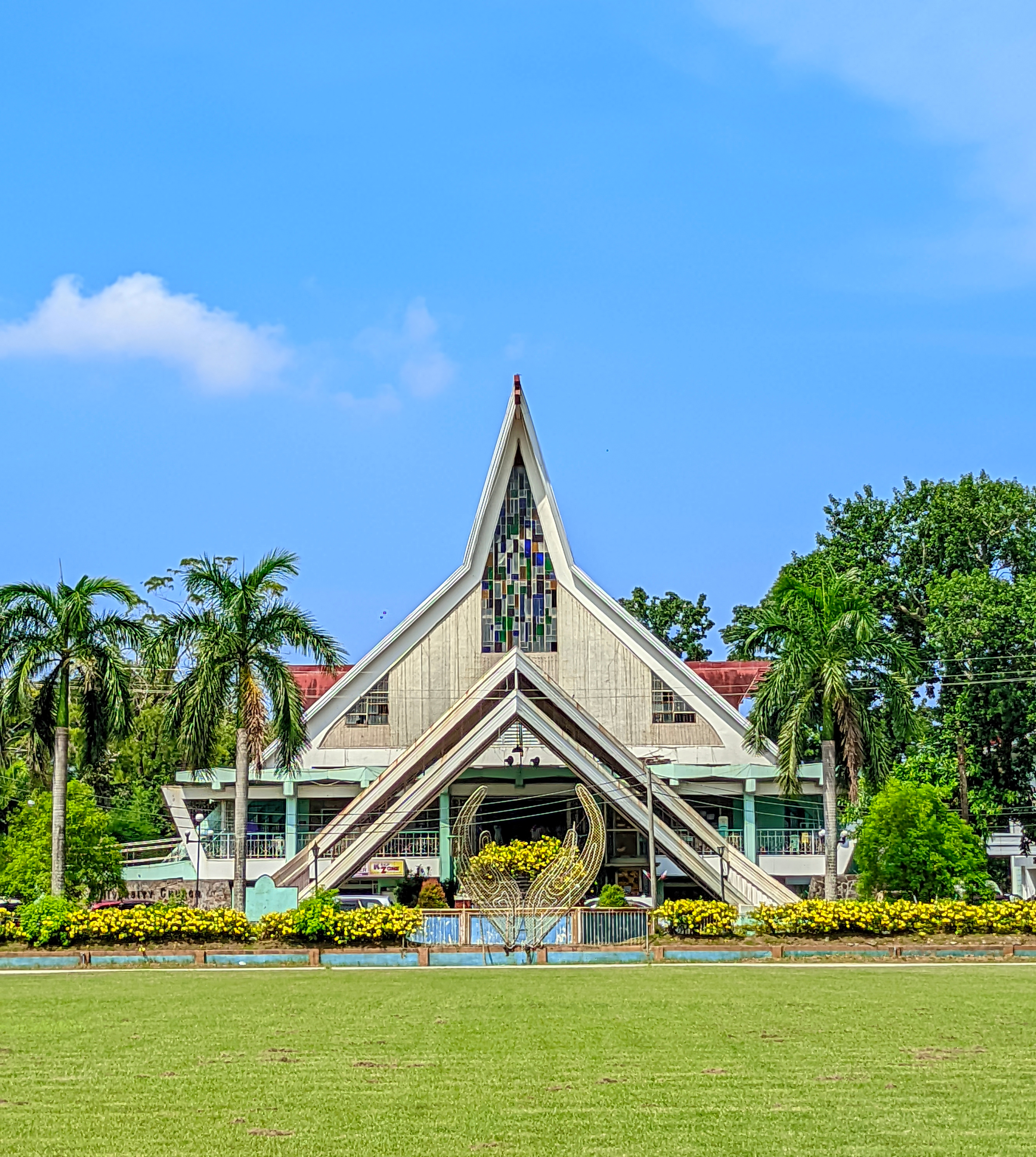
Central Philippine University is the largest university in Iloilo City at 24-hectare (59-acre).

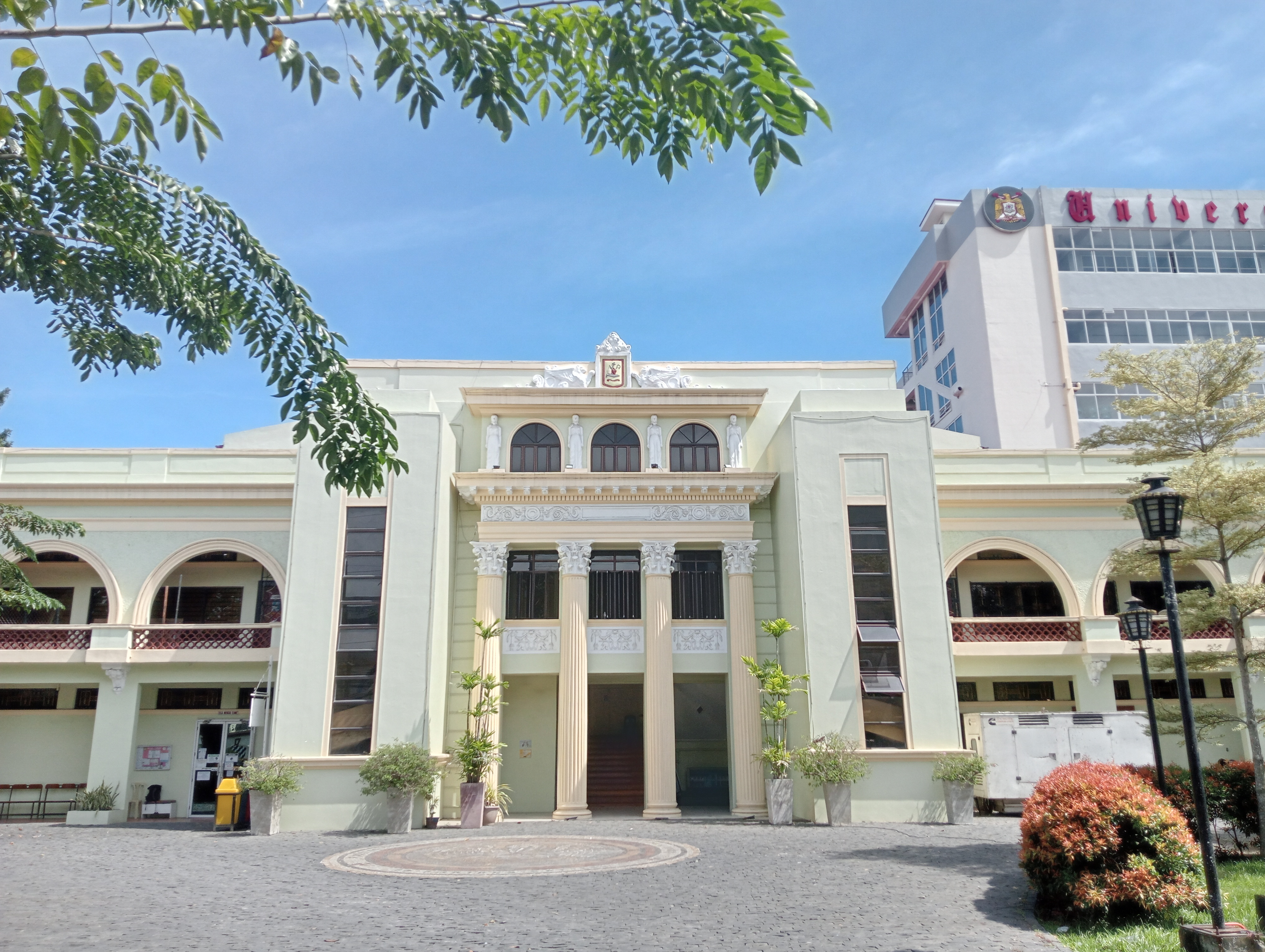
University of San Agustin is the first university in Western Visayas.

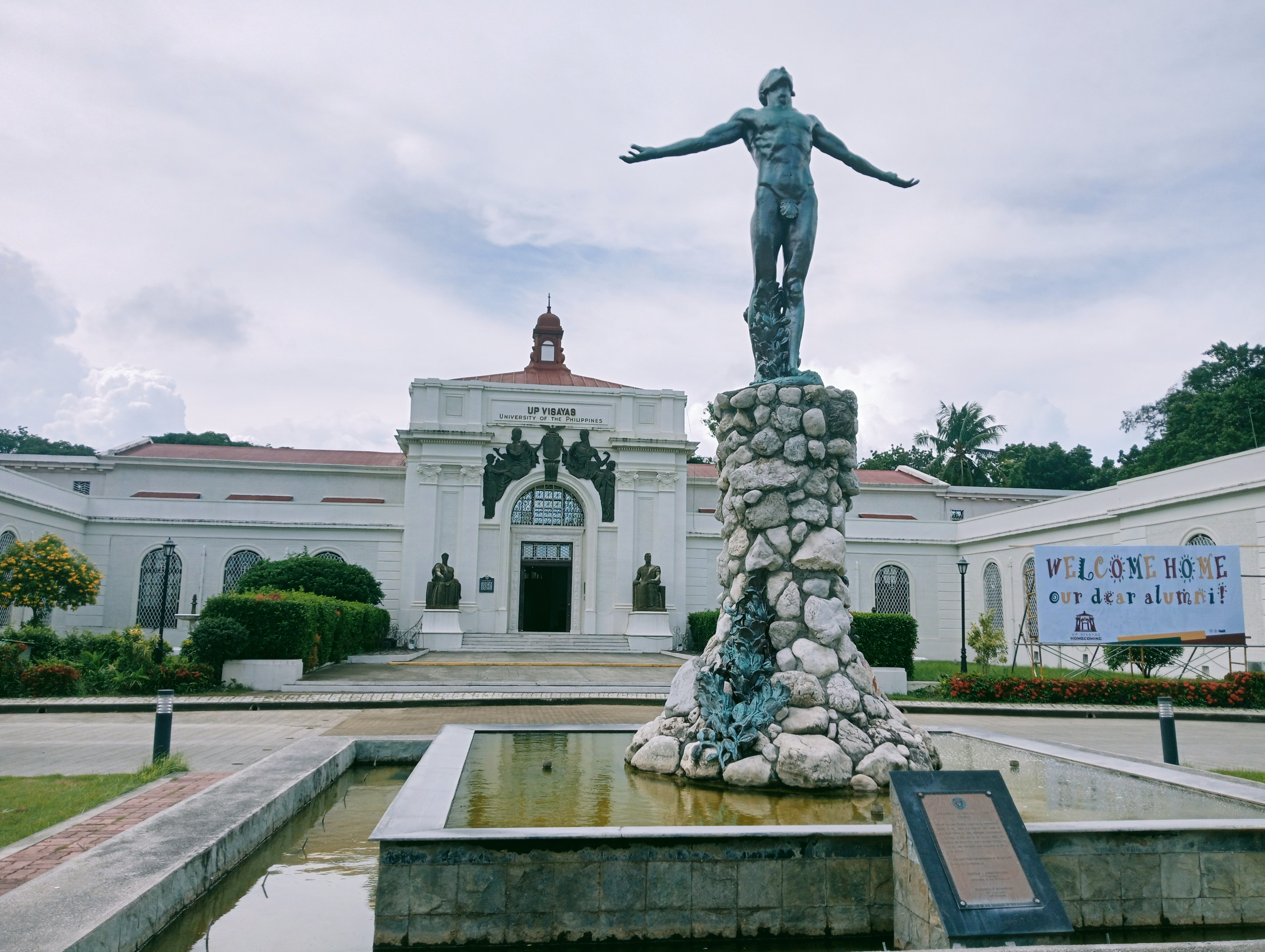
The main building of the University of the Philippines Visayas – Iloilo City campus.

Iloilo City serves as the primary educational hub of the Western Visayas region, with the city and province of Iloilo collectively hosting ten prominent universities. The city itself is home to eight higher education institutions.

- Central Philippine University (1905) was established in through the efforts of American Baptists, supported by a grant from American industrialist and philanthropist John D. Rockefeller. It holds the distinction of being the first Baptist-founded university and the second American and Protestant-established university in the Philippines and Asia. CPU has earned accolades from the Commission on Higher Education (CHED) and is consistently listed in top Asian and global university rankings by Quacquarelli Symonds, Times Higher Education, and AppliedHE (2023).
- The University of San Agustin (1904) was founded by Spanish Augustinians. It is the first Augustinian university in Asia and the Pacific and achieved university status in March 1953, marking it as the first university in Western Visayas.
- St. Paul University Iloilo (1946) was established by American Catholics with assistance from the French Sisters of St. Paul of Chartres, and operates as part of the St. Paul University System
- University of Iloilo (1947) was initially founded by the Lopez family and is now managed by the PHINMA Education Network
- John B. Lacson Foundation Maritime University (1948) was established by Juan Bautista Lacson and is the first maritime university in the Philippines.

Three government-owned universities operate in Iloilo City:

- University of the Philippines Visayas (1947) is an autonomous unit of the University of the Philippines System, maintaining a satellite campus in Iloilo City where the old Iloilo City Hall now serves as its administration building and art gallery, with its main campus in Miag-ao, Iloilo.
- West Visayas State University (1902) was formally established under the guidance of American Thomasites within the Philippine Normal School system, and is one of the most prominent universities in Iloilo.
- Iloilo Science and Technology University (1905) was founded as a trade school by Americans succeeding a Spanish-era arts and trade school.

Beyond these, a new campus of National University (1900) is under construction next to SM City Iloilo in Mandurriao. The Ateneo Graduate School of Business, part of Ateneo de Manila University (1859), operates a satellite campus at Ateneo de Iloilo (1958), offering a Master of Business Administration (MBA) program as a step toward establishing a full university. Philippine Christian University (1946) and Guimaras State University (1964) also maintain smaller extension programs in the city.

The Iloilo City Community College (ICCC), administered by the city government in collaboration with CHED. Additionally, Iloilo City hosts numerous private colleges and schools, including Iloilo Doctors' College (1972), Westbridge School for Boys (PAREF), St. Therese – MTC Colleges, Western Institute of Technology (1964), and religious institutions such as Ateneo de Iloilo, Angelicum School Iloilo (1978), and Colegio de San Jose (1872)—the oldest girls’ school in Western Visayas. Religious training centers include St. Joseph Regional Seminary, St. Vincent Ferrer Seminary (1869), and Mill Hill Formation House. The Department of Education – Division of Iloilo City oversees 88 private schools and 52 public schools.

== Awards and recognitions ==
Iloilo City has been recognized one of the Philippines’ cleanest and most livable urban centers in 2024.

== Sister cities ==
Iloilo City is twinned with:

=== International ===
- Stockton, United States, 1956
- Hågat, Guam, 1994
- Qingdao, China, 2000
- Guigang, China, 2004
- Guangxi, China, 2010
- Huaibei, China, 2012
- Dededo, Guam, 2012
- Palembang, Indonesia, 2016
- Quanzhou, China, 2020
- Wuhan, China, 2021
- Dobong-Gu, South Korea, 2024
- Fort Lauderdale, United States, 2025

=== Domestic ===
- General Santos, South Cotabato, 1980
- South Cotabato, 1980
- Quezon City, Metro Manila, 1994
- Marikina City, Metro Manila, 1994
- Mandaue, Cebu, 2007
- Bacolod, Negros Occidental, 2010
- Rosario, Batangas, 2011
- San Juan, Metro Manila, 2013
- Tacurong, Sultan Kudarat, 2014
- Koronadal, South Cotabato, 2014

=== Friendship cities ===
Iloilo City also has friendly relations with:

- Seattle, United States, 1980
- Icheon, South Korea, 1995
- Brisbane, Australia, 2000
- Tongyeong, South Korea, 2003
- Hsinchu, Taiwan, 2004
- Bilbao, Spain, 2007
- Kaoshiung, Taiwan, 2007
- Daly City, United States, 2011
- Makati, Metro Manila
- Puerto Princesa, Palawan
- Taguig City, Metro Manila
- Tagum, Davao del Norte

== See also ==
- Iloilo Central Business District
- Iloilo City Proper
- Metro Iloilo–Guimaras
- Iloilo Province

== Notes ==
Preceded by Cebu City	Capital of the Spanish East Indies; 1569–1571	Succeeded by Manila
Preceded by Manila	Capital of the Spanish East Indies; 1898–1899	Independence declared
Preceded by Arevalo	Capital of Iloilo; 1700–present	Incumbent
