= Luna Street =

Street in Iloilo City, Philippines

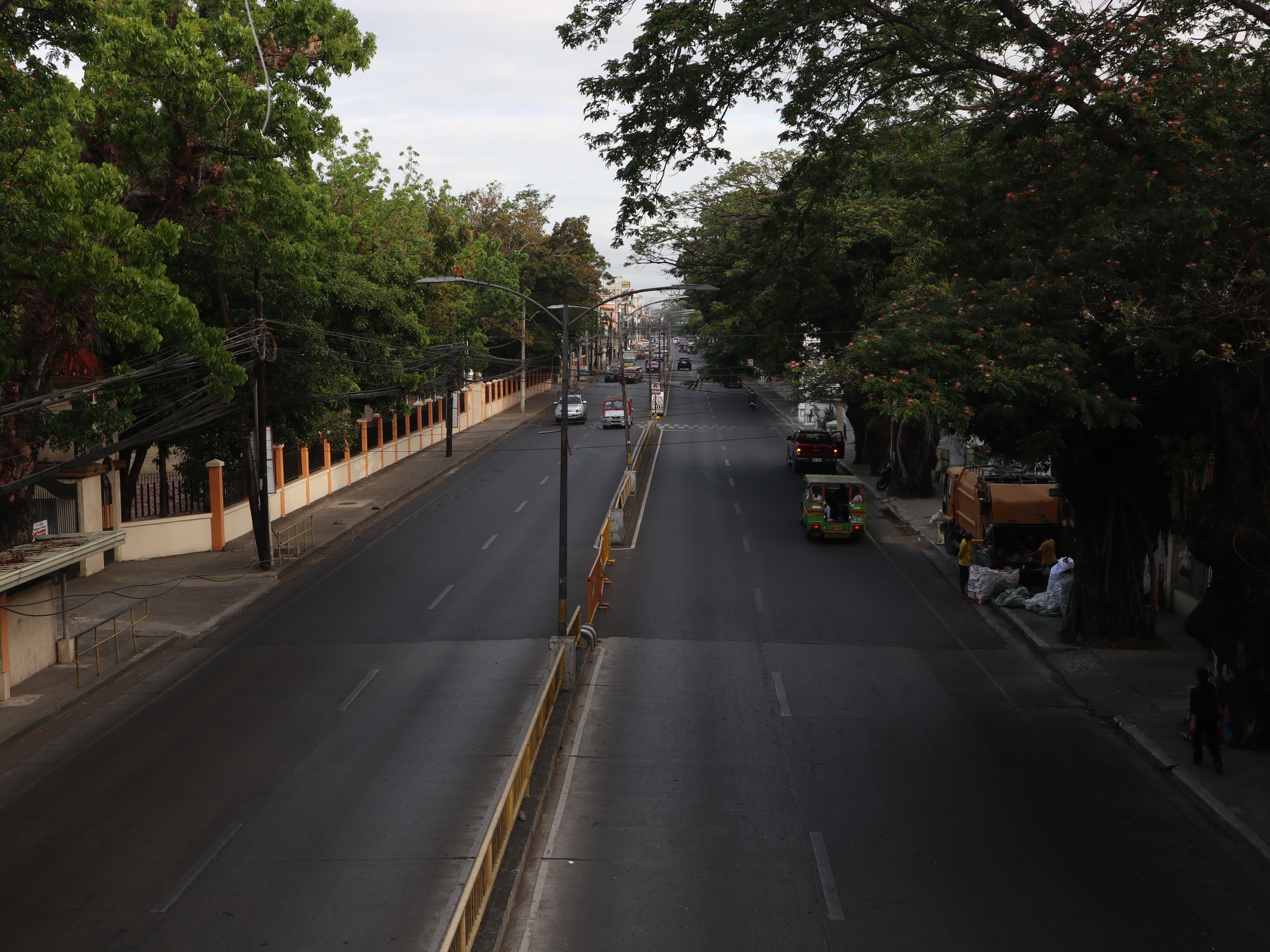
- Luna Street northbound
- Part of: N5
- Namesake: Juan Luna
- Length: 1.1 km (0.68 mi)
- Location: Iloilo City, Philippines
- North end: E. Lopez Street
- Major junctions: Magsaysay Road; Rizal Street; Hechanova Street; Huervana Street
- South end: Forbes Bridge

Luna Street is a street in the La Paz district of Iloilo City, Philippines. It was once part of the Iloilo Millionaires' Row, the first millionaires' row in the Philippines. Luna Street, along with E. Lopez Street, forms the first concrete road in the country, which extended from the Forbes Bridge across the Iloilo River to Jaro Plaza.

The street was named after Juan Luna, a renowned Filipino painter, sculptor, and political activist during the Philippine Revolution. Luna is best known for his famous works such as Spoliarium and his significant contributions to Philippine art and nationalist movements.

== Intersections ==
The entire route is located in La Paz, Iloilo City.

km	mi	Destinations	Notes
		N5 (E. Lopez Street)	Northern terminus.
		J.B. Ledesma Avenue	Southbound only
		Magsaysay Road	Unsignalized intersection
		Arroyo Street	Northbound only
		Rizal Street	Northbound only
		Hechanova Street	Southbound only
		Huervana Street	Unsignalized intersection
		Senator Efrain Treñas Boulevard	Southbound only
		N5 (Forbes Bridge)	Southern terminus.
1.000 mi = 1.609 km; 1.000 km = 0.621 mi

== Landmarks ==
From north to south:

- West Visayas State University
- Iloilo National High School
- Iloilo Baptist Center
- ABS-CBN Regional Station
- Lopez Boat House
- St. Clement's Church
- Western Institute of Technology
- La Paz Public Market
- Gaisano Capital La Paz
- Iloilo River Esplanade
- Forbes Bridge
