= Iloilo River Esplanade =

Linear park in Iloilo City

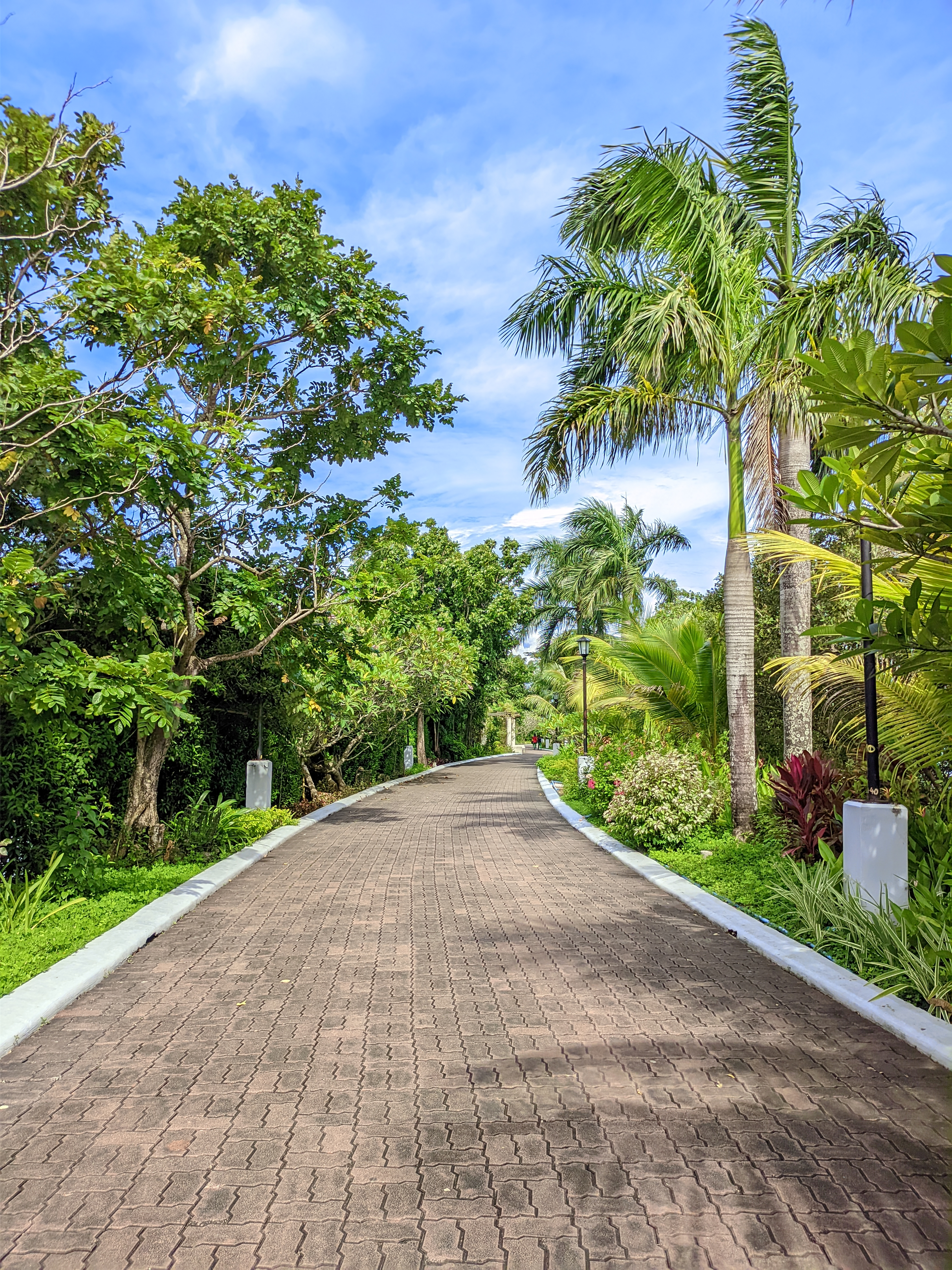
- Iloilo River Esplanade Phase 1
- Interactive map of Iloilo River Esplanade
- Type: Esplanade; urban linear park
- Location: Iloilo City, Philippines
- Coordinates: 10°42′07″N 122°32′42″E
- Area: 9.29-kilometre (5.77 mi) linear stretch
- Opened: August 18, 2012; 13 years ago
- Designer: Paulo Alcazaren (PGAA Creative Design)
- Owner: Iloilo City Government (LGU)
- Operator: Iloilo City Tourism and Development Office
- Status: Opened

The Iloilo River Esplanade is a 9.29-kilometre-long (5.77 mi) urban esplanade and linear park along the Iloilo River in Iloilo City, Philippines. It stretches on both sides of the river, from Carpenter Bridge in Mandurriao and Molo districts to Drilon Bridge in the City Proper and Lapuz districts. It is considered the longest linear park in the Philippines and was designed by landscape architect and PGAA Creative Design founder Paulo Alcazaren. The project is part of the Iloilo River Rehabilitation Project.

The esplanade has been one of the most popular attractions in Iloilo City for both locals and tourists since it opened on August 18, 2012. It currently features 13 sections connected by 11 bridges. Additional sections include a 1.58-kilometre (0.98 mi) esplanade along the Iloilo Sunset Boulevard and the under-construction Dungon Creek Esplanade, an approximately 5.96-kilometre-long (3.70 mi) linear park along the Dungon Creek, a tributary of the Iloilo River. Together, the Iloilo City Esplanade network spans a total of about 16.83 kilometres (10.46 mi).

== History ==
=== Dike road ===
Iloilo River in 2003, before the esplanade was constructed

The road, formally known as Senator Efrain Treñas Boulevard, was built in 2008 to help ease traffic congestion on congested General Luna Street. The site was an existing dike road devoid of shade and also originally built chiefly as a flood control measure. Locals, on the other hand, used the road for recreation, such as jogging and biking. The Iloilo City Government realized and reconsidered it, and decided to build a linear park instead of a road.

=== Designing and river rehabilitation ===
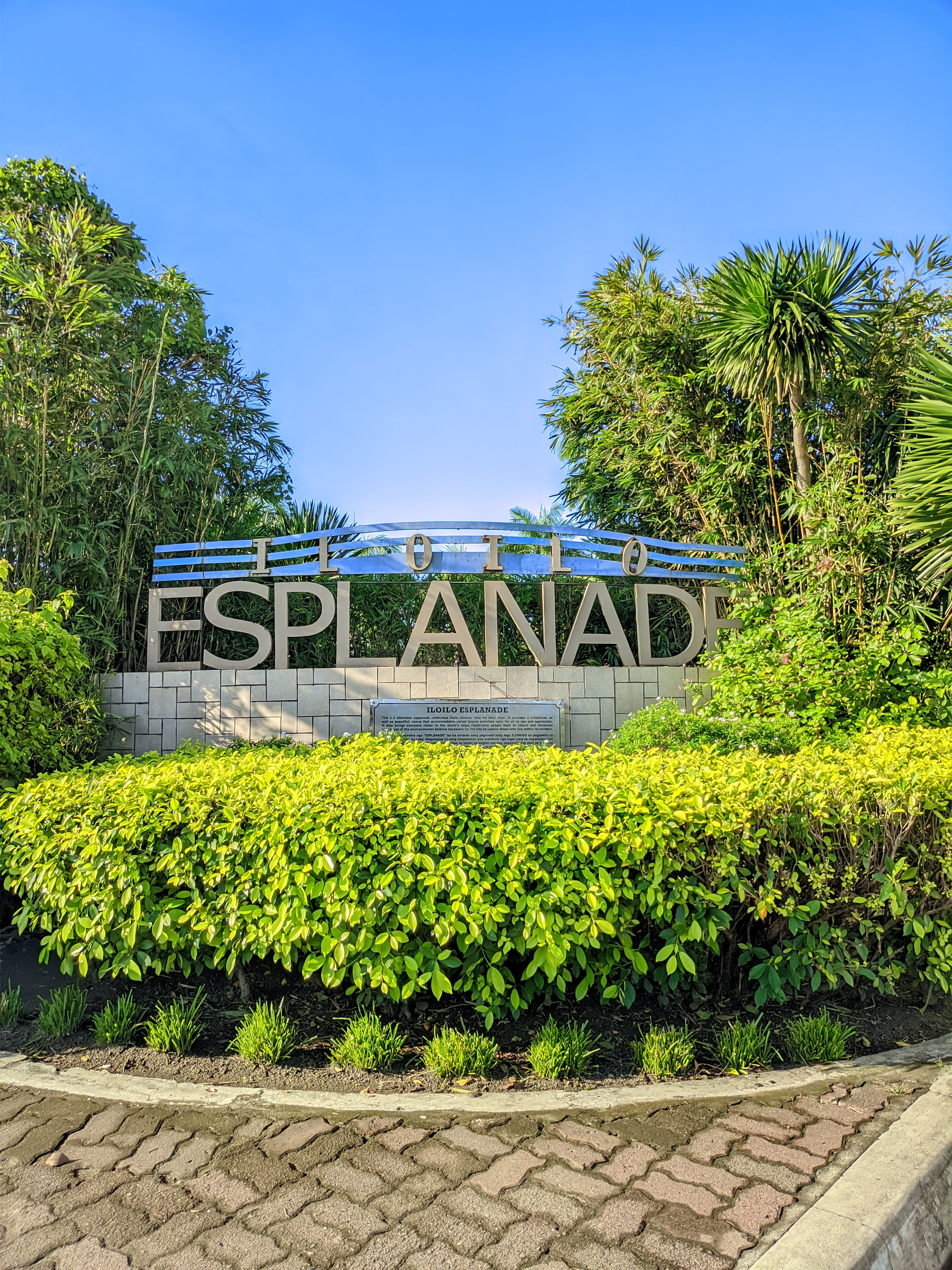
Iloilo Esplanade signage

The city government gave in to public clamor and started work on developing the riverside stretch into a public park. Former Senate President Franklin Drilon supported the project with funds from his Priority Development Assistance Fund, along with former Iloilo City Mayor Jed Patrick Mabilog and incumbent Iloilo City Mayor Jerry P. Treñas (at the time, an Iloilo City congressman), and launched the esplanade project as a key component of their Iloilo River Improvement initiative.

The Iloilo River Development Council was at the forefront of the campaign for rehabilitating the river, which also involved various sectors, including private business groups and educational institutions. Businesses made river cleanups part of their corporate social responsibility projects, while schools made them part of the national service training programs.

The administration of former Mayor Jed Mabilog was also able to relocate about 1,000 informal settlers along the river into proper housing sites.

Renowned Filipino architect and PGAA Creative Design founder Paulo Alcazaren, who also worked on the Singapore Quay and River Esplanade, was tapped to draw up layouts and designs for the public linear park.

=== Opening and extensions ===
Iloilo River Esplanade route

The transformation of the boulevard was the initial part of a larger project to provide both sides of the Iloilo River with esplanades catering primarily to pedestrians. On August 18, 2012, the first phase of the project was opened to the public and cost ₱58.7 million. The esplanade was 1.2-kilometre-long (0.75 mi) between Iloilo Diversion (Sen. Benigno Aquino Jr. Avenue) and Carpenter bridges in Mandurriao district. The project was eventually expanded into the 2.6 km (1.6 mi) Esplanade 2 on the other side of the river in Molo district, creating a walk-friendly loop between the two bridges.

In 2017, more phases of the project were funded and constructed by the Department of Public Works and Highways (DPWH), and they were completed in 2020, with a total length of 9.035 kilometres (5.614 mi) and a total cost of ₱1.12 billion. The Iloilo River Esplanade became the longest linear park in the country with a total of thirteen phases and that traverses through five of the seven Iloilo City districts: Molo, Mandurriao, La Paz, Lapuz, and the City Proper. However, the city government announced in 2018 that it would no longer allow the extension of the Iloilo River Esplanade project towards the mouth of the river, citing the discovery that many corporations use the area and would be impacted if the project continued up to the Parola area in the City Proper.

In April 2022, the DPWH began the construction of the initial ₱1.4-billion road project, which was designed as an alternate route from Iloilo City to towns in southern Iloilo province, connecting Barangay Tabucan in Mandurriao, Iloilo City to Barangay Cagbang in Oton. The project, later known as the Iloilo Sunset Boulevard, also included a 1.58 kilometres (0.98 mi) extension of the city's esplanade network. The boulevard, completed at a total cost of about ₱2.26 billion, was officially opened to the public in January 2025. A 240 metres (0.15 mi) connectivity section from Esplanade 1 to the boulevard, which includes a proposed footbridge, was also introduced by the DPWH. However, as of September 2025, the project has been postponed due to permitting and environmental concerns.

== Sections and phases ==
As of 2026, there are a total of 13 completed sections of the Iloilo River Esplanade.

Sections of Iloilo River Esplanade
Name	Length	Location			Opening date
Name	Length	Section Between		District(s)	Opening date
Esplanade 1	1.26 km (0.78 miles)	Carpenter Bridge	Iloilo Bridge	Mandurriao	August 18, 2012
Esplanade 1 Extension	0.27 km (0.17 miles)	Iloilo Bridge	Nabitasan Bridge	Mandurriao	August 26, 2017
Esplanade 2	1.27 km (0.79 miles)	Carpenter Bridge	Iloilo Bridge	Molo	August 2015
Esplanade 3	0.88 km (0.55 miles)	Nabitasan Bridge	Jalandoni Bridge	La Paz	2021
Esplanade 4	0.83 km (0.52 miles)	Iloilo Bridge	Jalandoni Bridge	City Proper	2018
Esplanade 5	0.9 km (0.56 miles)	Jalandoni Bridge	Forbes Bridge	La Paz	July 27, 2019
Esplanade 6	0.85 km (0.53 miles)	Jalandoni Bridge	Forbes Bridge	City Proper	July 27, 2019
Esplanade 7	0.2 km (0.12 miles)	Forbes Bridge	Rizal Bridge	La Paz	July 27, 2019
Esplanade 8	1.41 km (0.88 miles)	Rizal Bridge	Freedom Grandstand	City Proper	July 27, 2019
Esplanade 9	0.62 km (0.39 miles)	Rizal Bridge	Quirino-Lopez Bridge	La Paz, Lapuz	December 2020
Esplanade 10	0.1 km (0.062 miles)	Forbes Bridge	Rizal Bridge	City Proper	July 2022
Esplanade 11	0.54 km (0.34 miles)	Quirino-Lopez Bridge	Drilon Bridge	Lapuz	2025
Esplanade 12	0.24 km (0.15 miles)	Carpenter Bridge	Sunset Boulevard	Mandurriao	TBA
Esplanade Lapuz (Note: Esplanade Lapuz was originally named Esplanade 3 when it opened in 2016. It now bears an unofficial name to allow the esplanade in Nabitasan, La Paz to be designated as Esplanade 3. This change ensures a proper numerical order for all esplanades, starting with Esplanade 1 based on their locations.)	0.16 km (0.099 miles)	Drilon Bridge	Fastcraft Terminal	Lapuz	February 2016

=== Dungon Creek Esplanade ===
The approximately 5.96-kilometre (3.70 mi) Dungon Creek Esplanade is part of an interconnected network of esplanades in Iloilo City. It is currently being developed along both sides of the Dungon Creek, a tributary of the Iloilo River that separates the district of Mandurriao from the districts of Jaro and La Paz.

=== Iloilo Sunset Boulevard ===
The 4.99-kilometre (3.10 mi) Iloilo Sunset Boulevard is a four-lane alternate road that extends from Mandurriao to Barangay Cagbang in Oton. The boulevard runs along the Iloilo River and features 1.58-kilometre (0.98 mi) extension of the interconnected river esplanade system of the city.

== Awards and recognition ==
The Iloilo River Esplanade has received multiple major awards. These include the 2017 GantimPALA Excellence Award for Institutional Projects by the Philippine Association of Landscape Architects, 2018 Haligi ng Dangal Award for the Landscape Architecture category in the 2018 National Commission for Culture and the Arts (NCCA) Haligi ng Dangal Awards, and 2018 Galing Pook Award for Iloilo River Development by Galing Pook Foundation. In 2024, the Iloilo River Esplanade was also awarded the Asian Townscape Award (ATA), an initiative by the United Nations Human Settlements Programme Regional Office for Asia and the Pacific (UN-Habitat ROAP), aimed at promoting sustainable urban landscapes in Asia.

Iloilo City Government's Iloilo Esplanade has been benchmarked by the other local governments in the country and has inspired other similar public infrastructure projects, including the Iloilo Bike Lane, Bacolod Esplanade, Iligan Esplanade, Malandog Hamtic Antique Esplanade, and San Jose Antique Esplanade, among others.

== Gallery ==
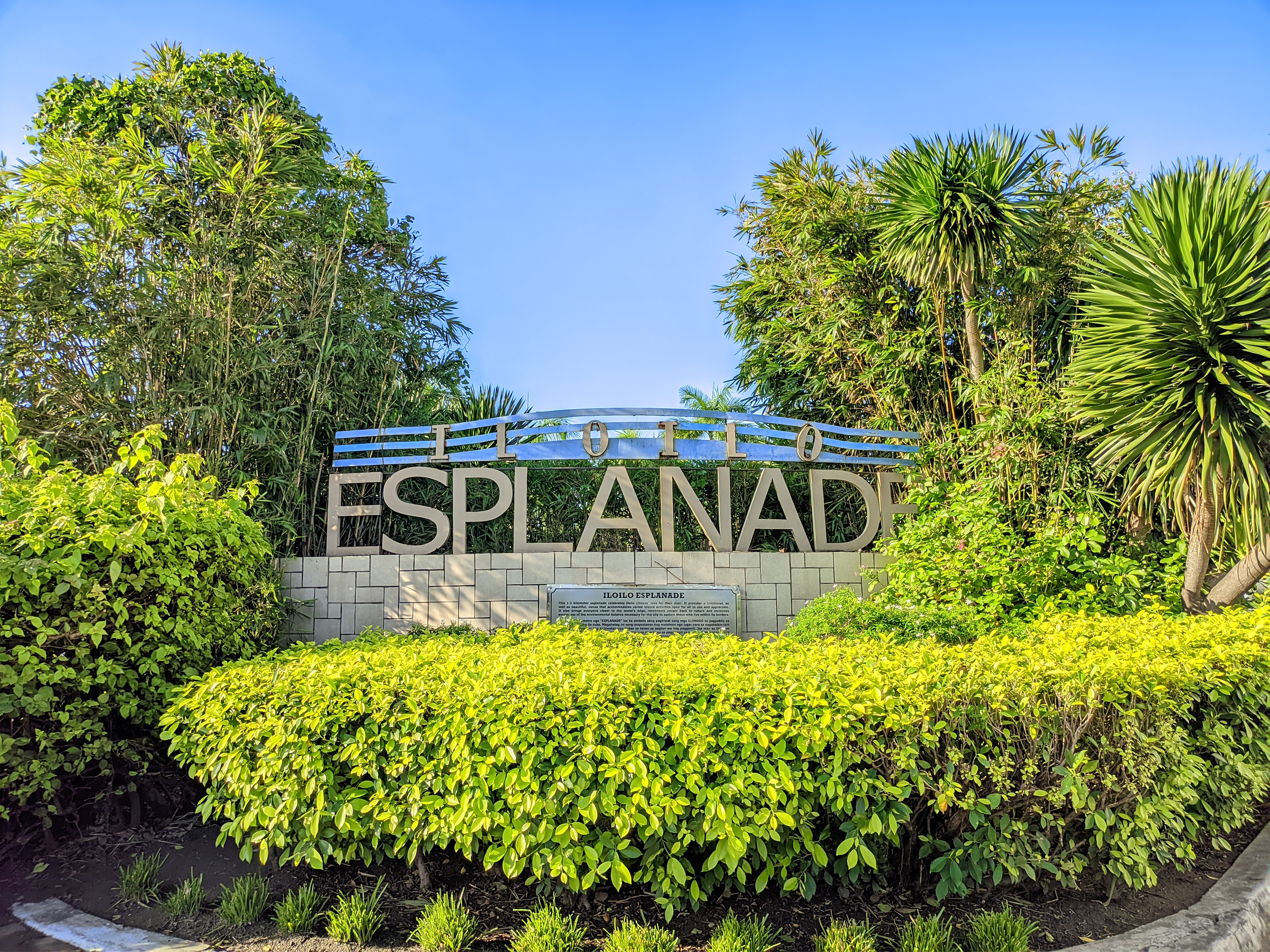
Iloilo River Esplanade welcome signage

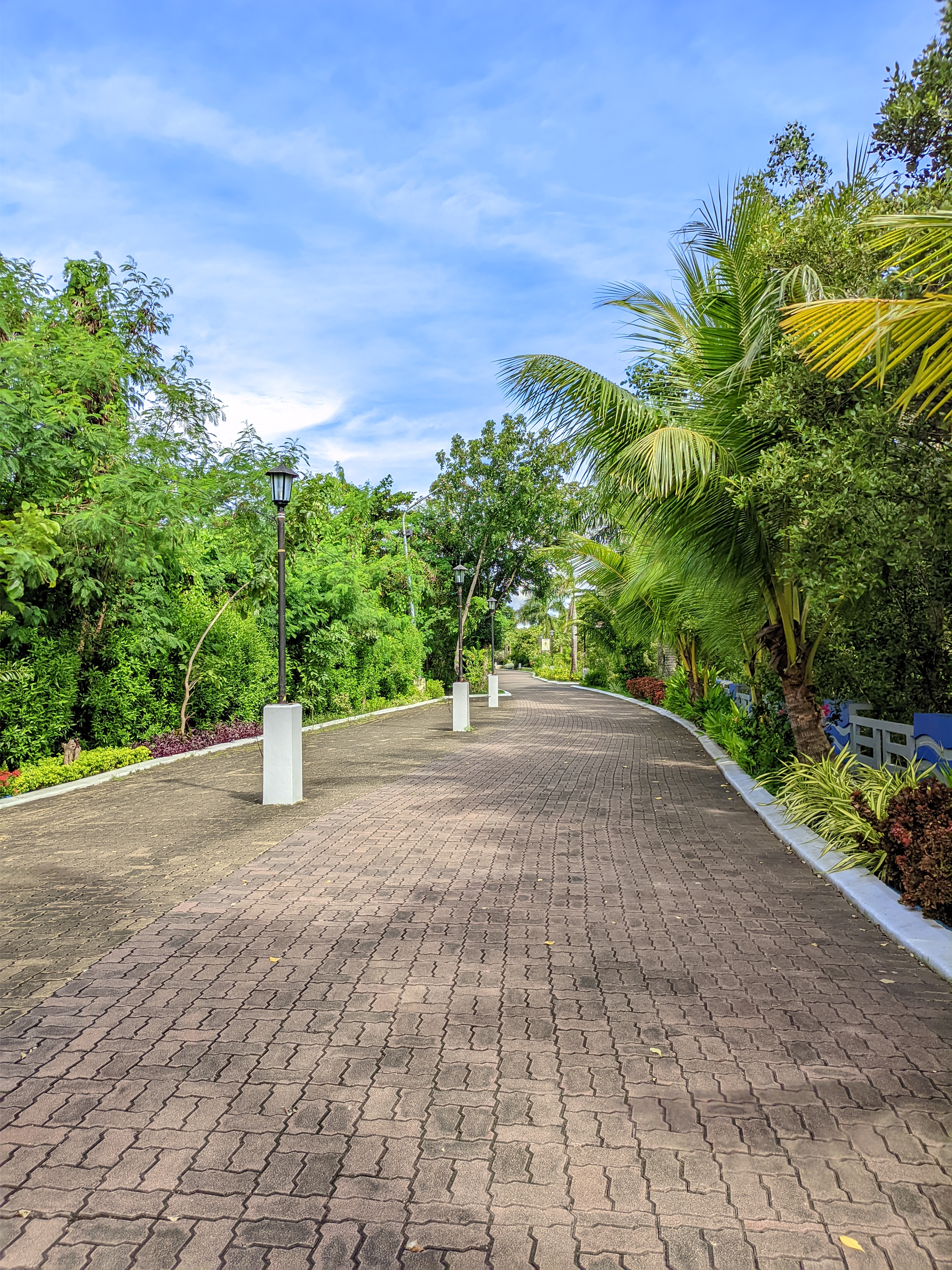
First phase of the Esplanade

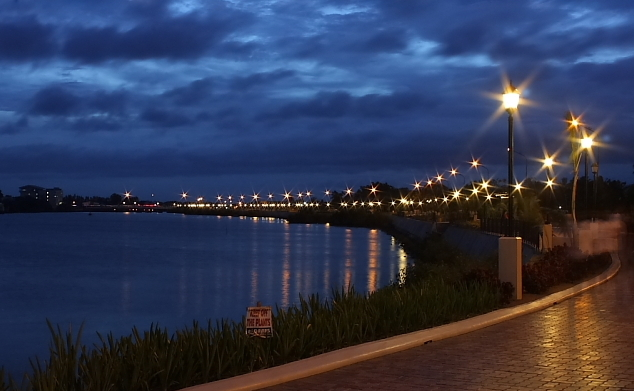
Iloilo River Esplanade at dusk

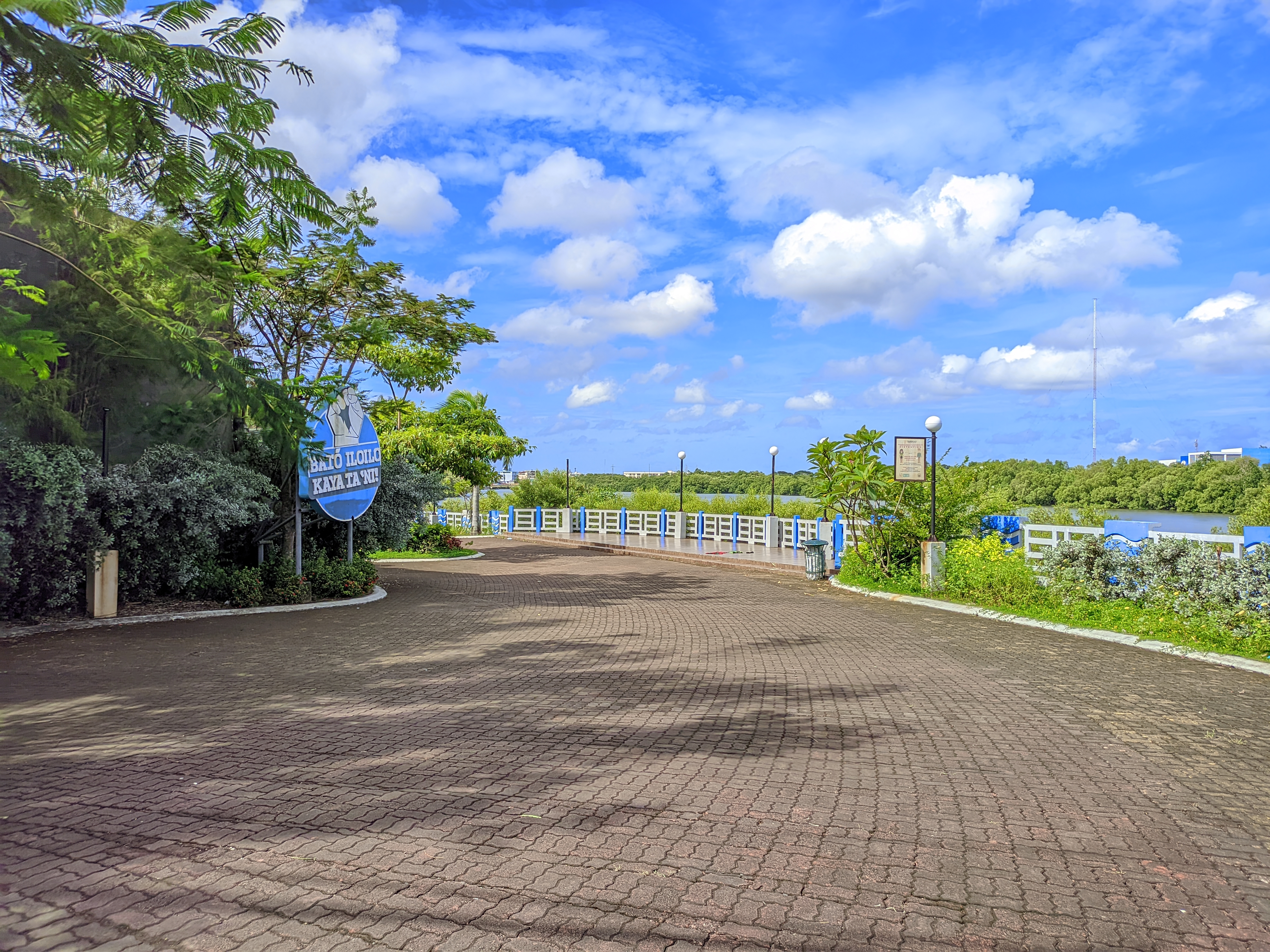
Iloilo River Esplanade Phase 6

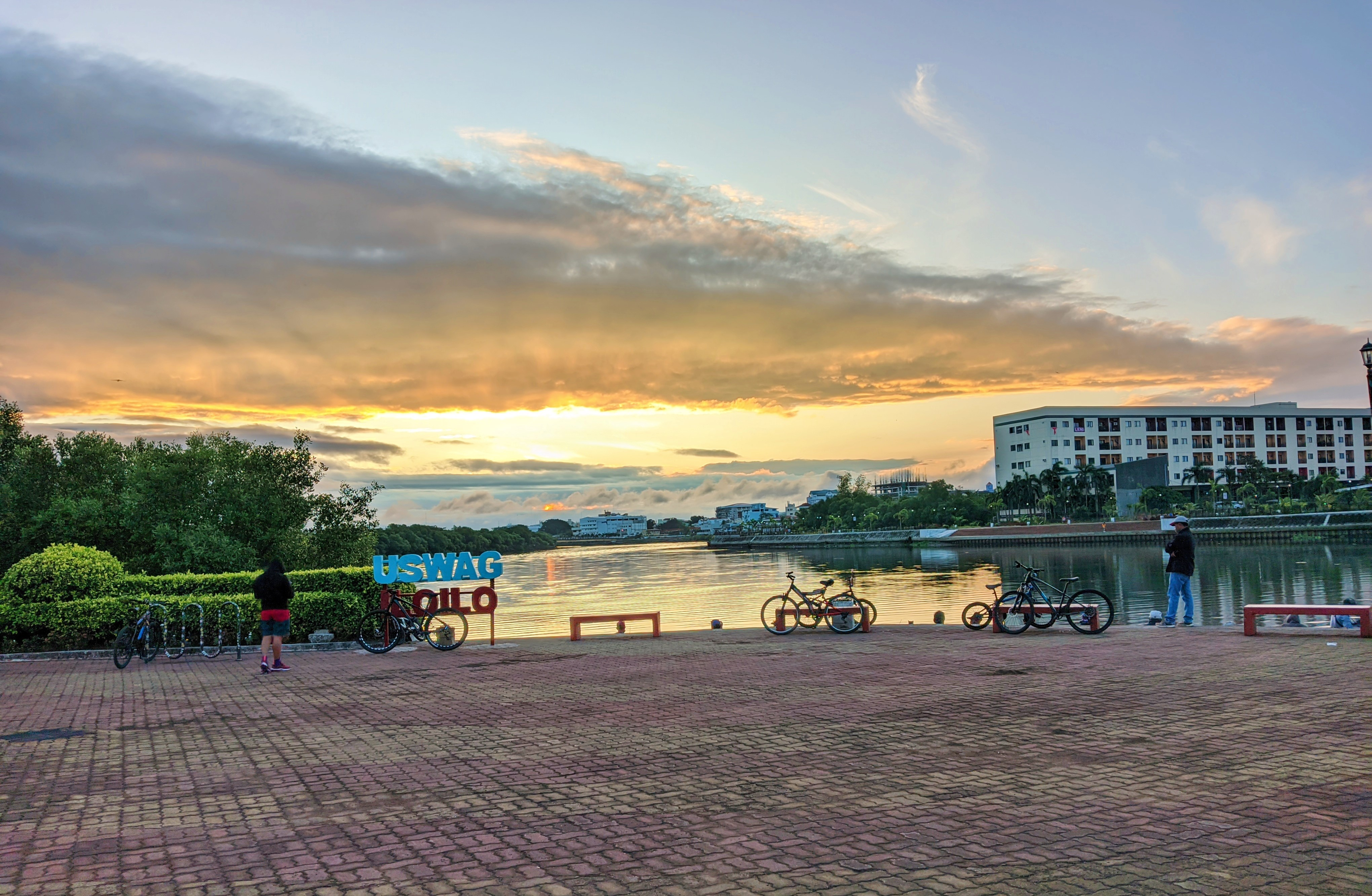
Sunset at the Iloilo River Esplanade 1 Extension (Skate Park)

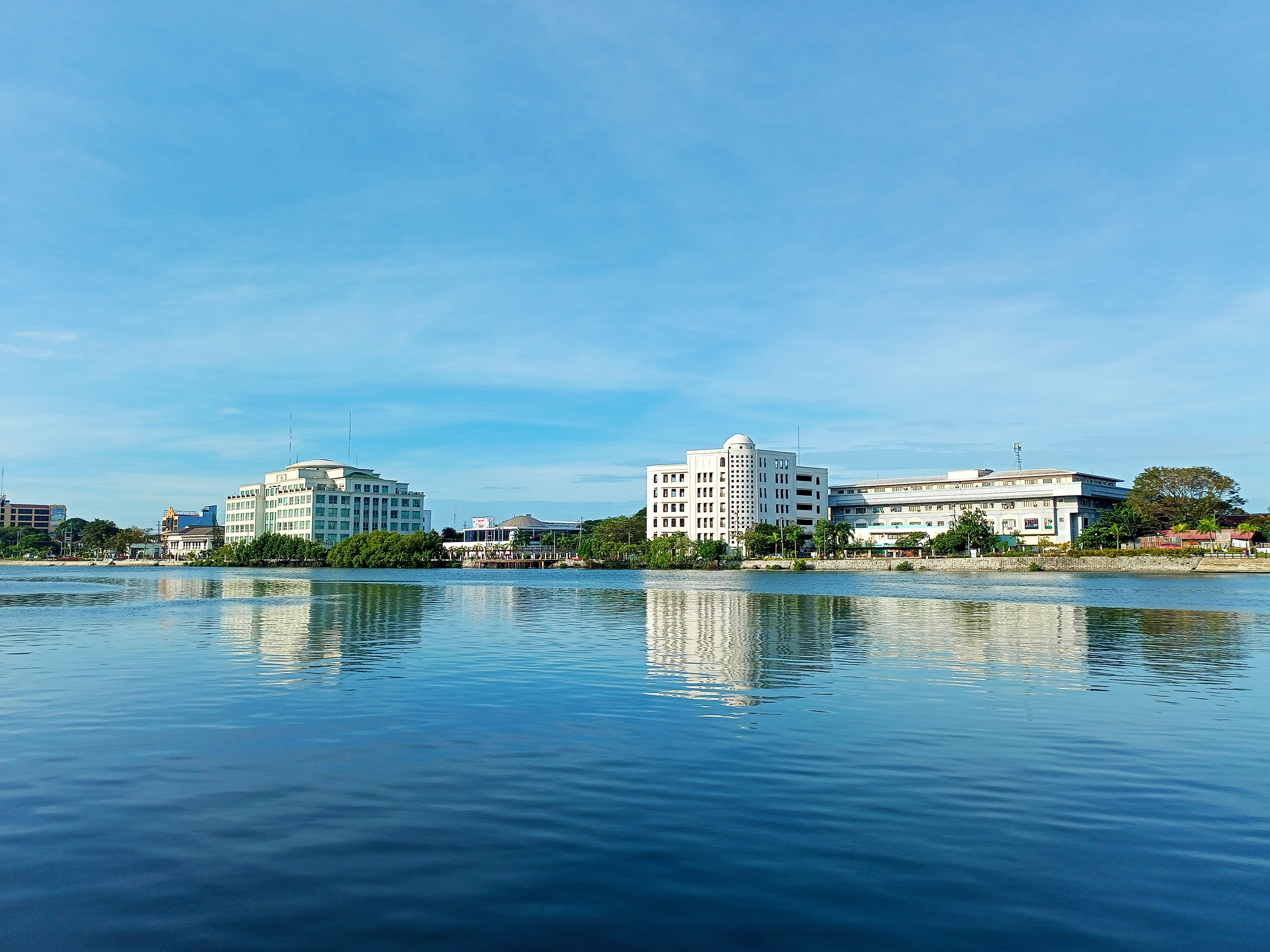
Iloilo River view from the Esplanade in Lapuz district

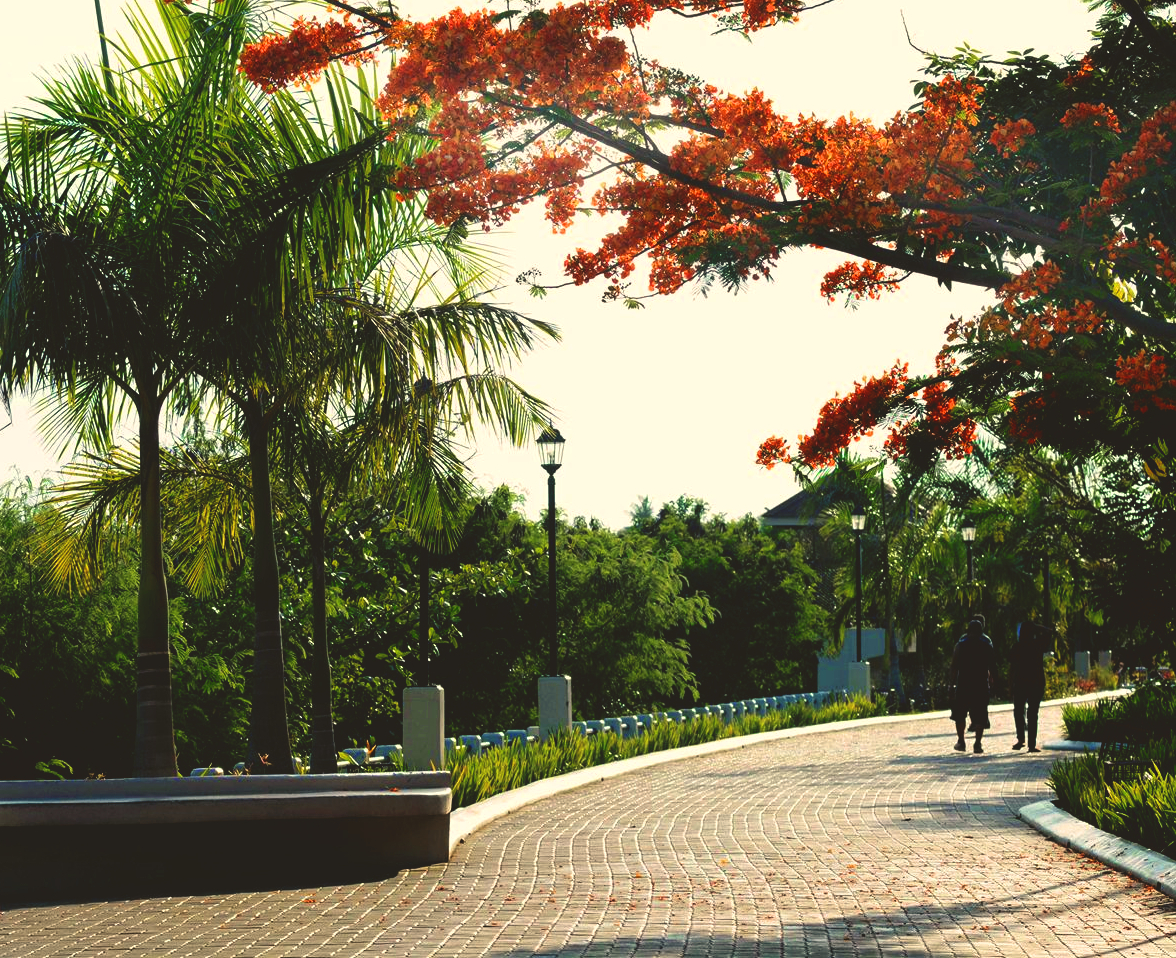
Fire trees along the esplanade

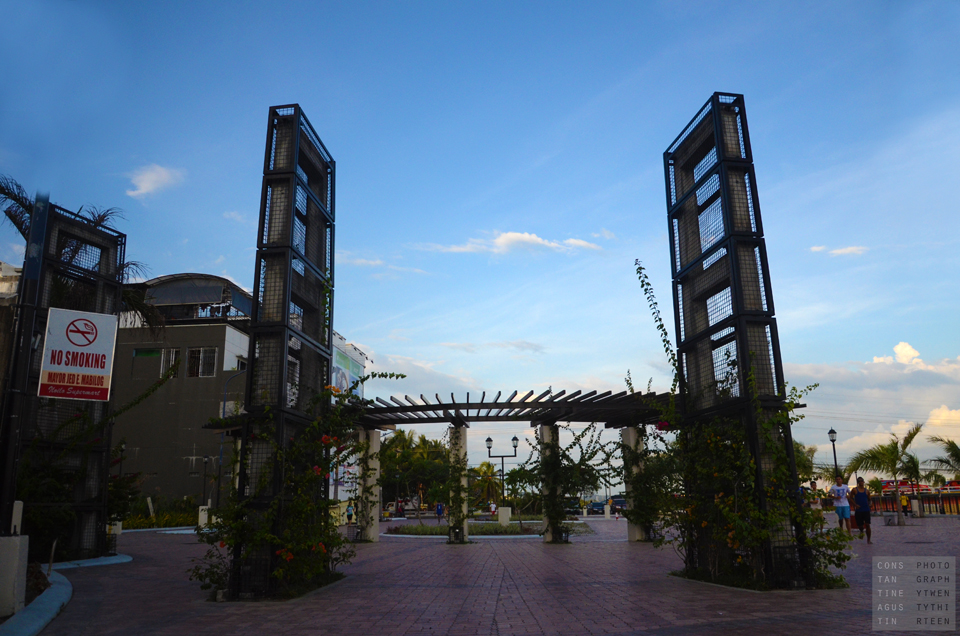
Trellises along the esplanade

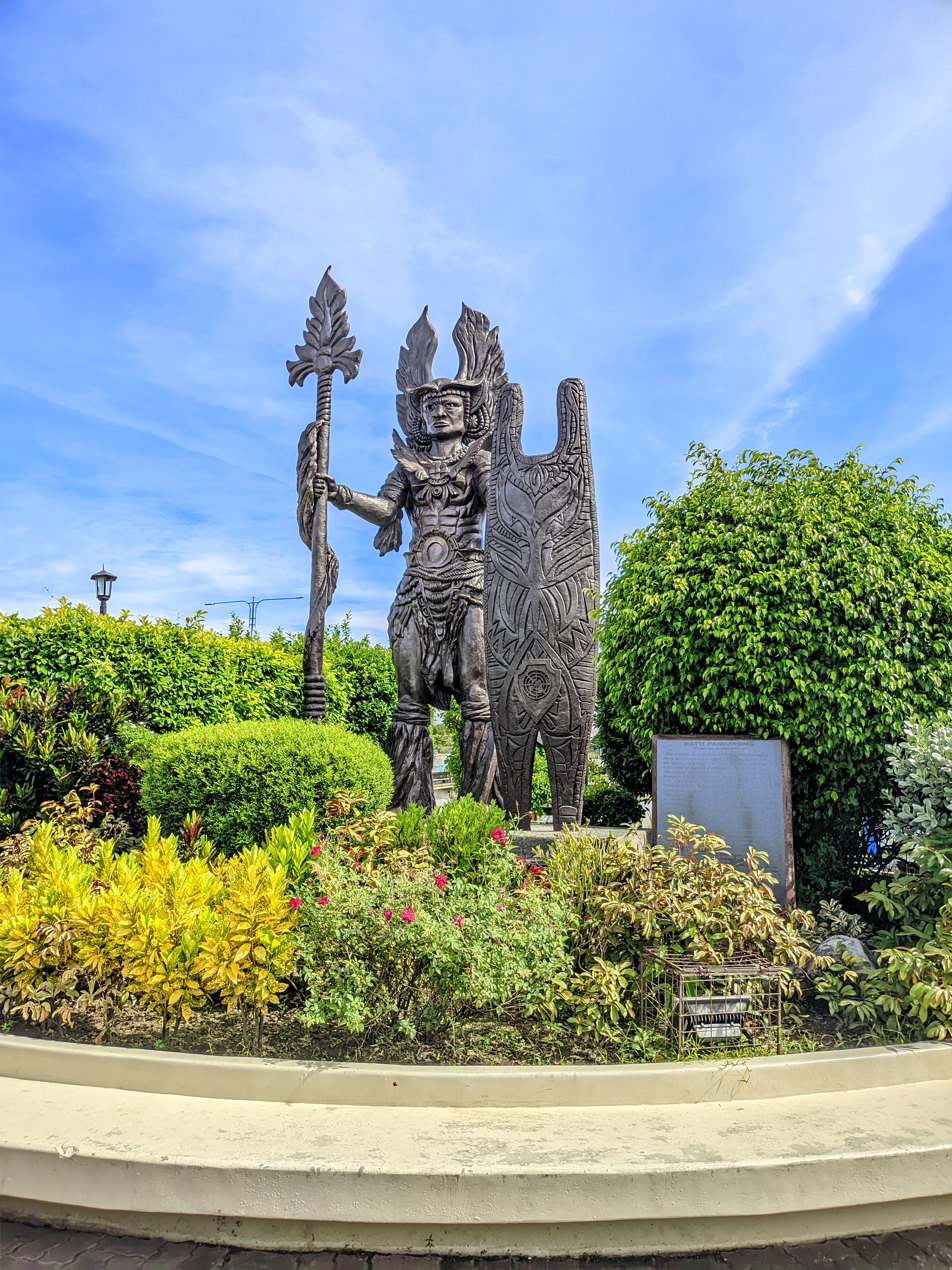
Datu Paiburong Monument

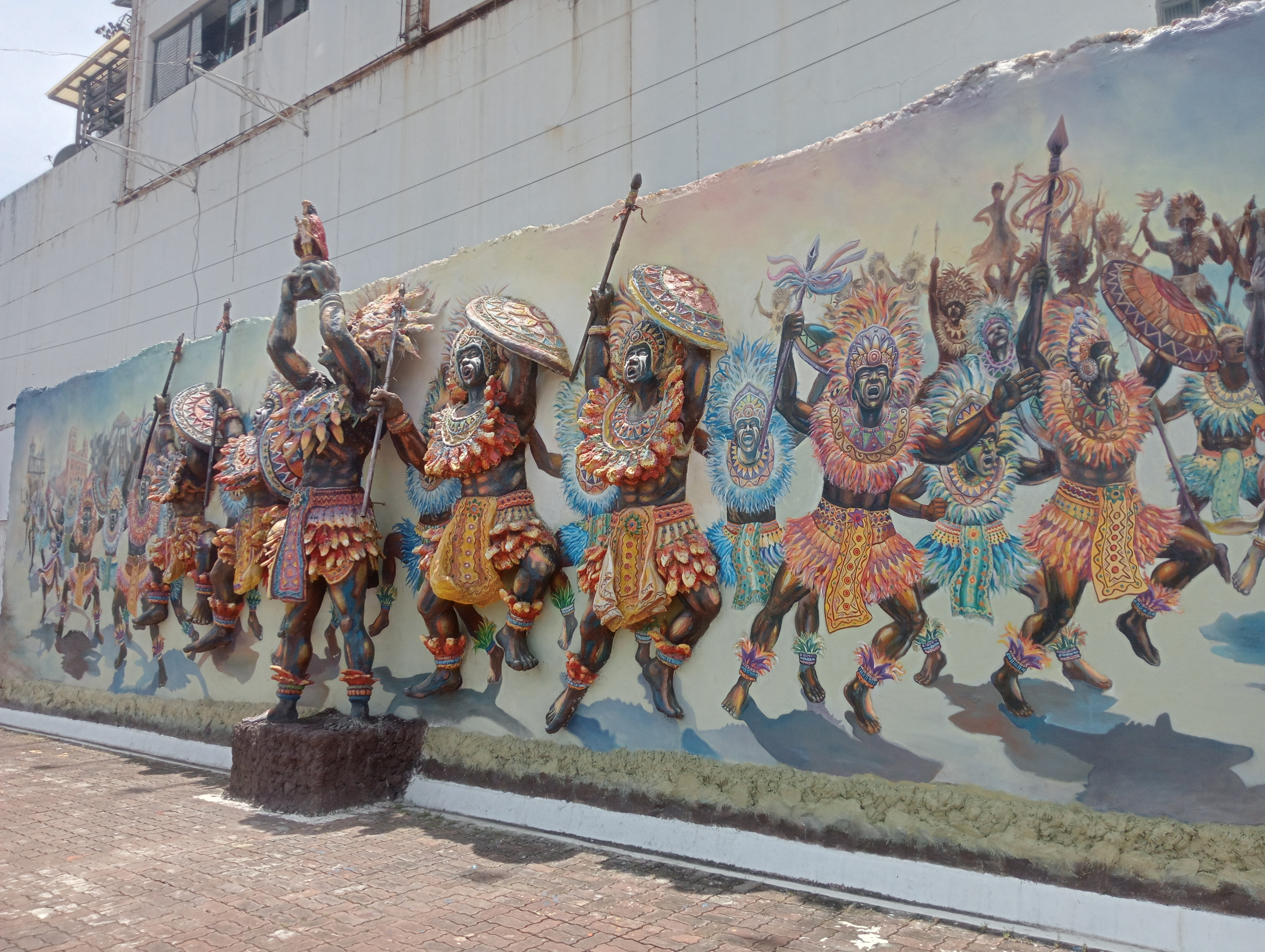
Dinagyang Mural

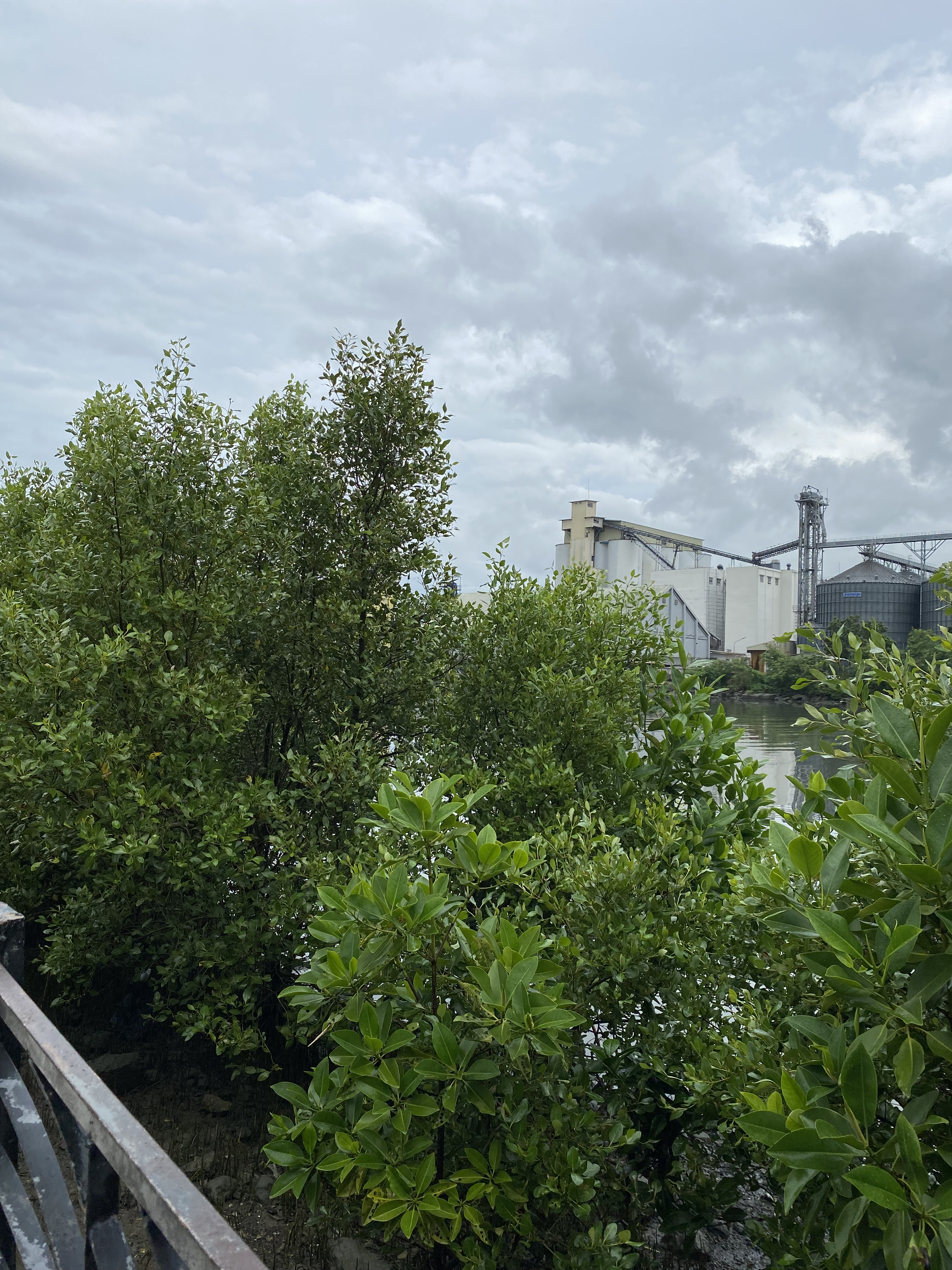
Mangroves along the esplanade

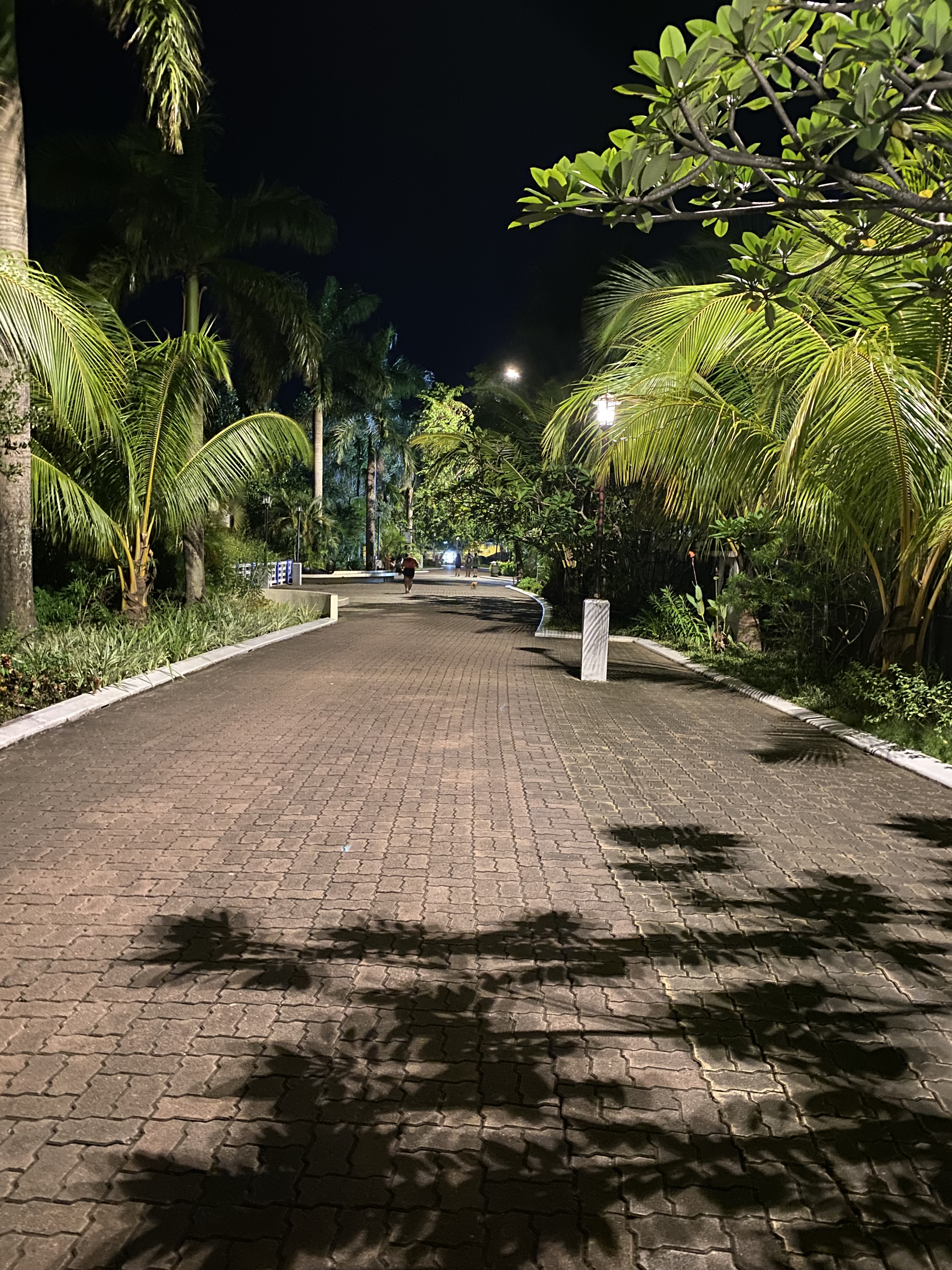
The Esplanade at night

== See also ==
- Iloilo River
