= Iloilo Bridge =

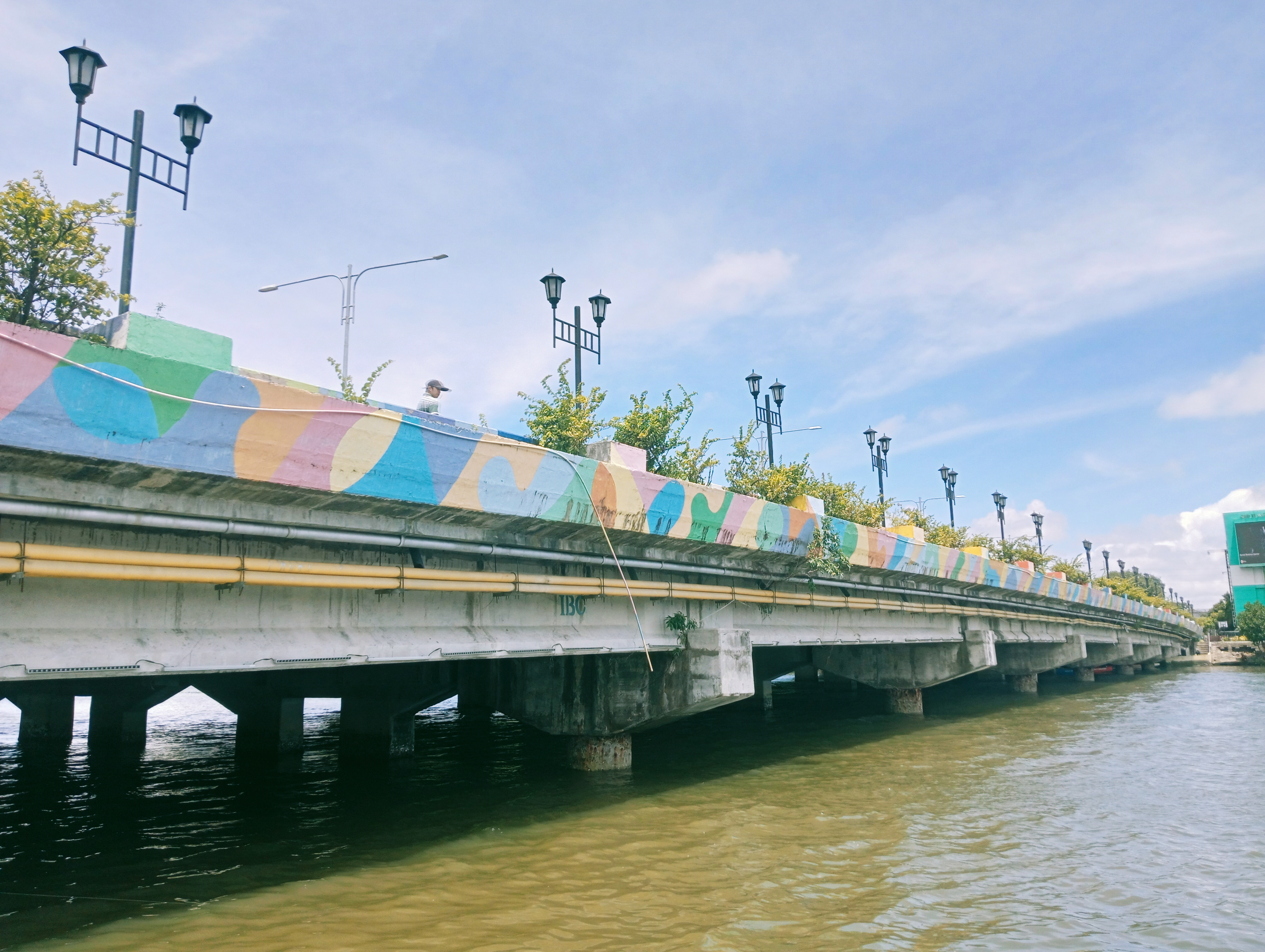
- Iloilo Bridge in 2024
- Coordinates: 10°42′6.02″N 122°33′13.4″E
- Carries: 8 lanes of N5, vehicles, pedestrians, and bicycles
- Crosses: Iloilo River
- Locale: Iloilo City, Philippines
- Official name: Iloilo Bridge I
- Maintained by: Iloilo City Government; Department of Public Works and Highways - Iloilo City District Engineering Office
- Preceded by: Jalandoni Bridge
- Followed by: Carpenter Bridge

Characteristics
- Design: Girder bridge
- Material: Concrete
- Total length: 144 m (472 ft)
- Width: 50 m (160 ft)
- Traversable?: yes
- No. of spans: 9
- Piers in water: 8
- Load limit: 20 t (20,000 kg)
- Clearance below: 4.05 m (13 ft) at mean tide
- No. of lanes: 8 (4 per direction)

History
- Inaugurated: 1982

The Iloilo Bridge, also known as Diversion Bridge, is an eight-lane girder bridge spanning the Iloilo River in Iloilo City, Philippines. It was completed in 1982 and connects Benigno S. Aquino Jr. Avenue in the Mandurriao district to the City Proper district.

== History ==
The Iloilo Bridge was built in 1982 as part of the construction of Benigno S. Aquino Jr. Avenue, formerly known as Jaro West Diversion Road, providing an alternative route from uptown to downtown Iloilo City. In 2014, the bridge was expanded from four lanes to eight lanes.

In 2020, the outermost lane on the eastern side of the Iloilo Bridge was converted into a designated bike lane, connecting to the bike lanes along the Iloilo River Esplanade on both sides of the river.

== See also ==
- Benigno S. Aquino Jr. Avenue
- Forbes Bridge
- Carpenter Bridge (Iloilo)
