= Quirino–Lopez Bridge =

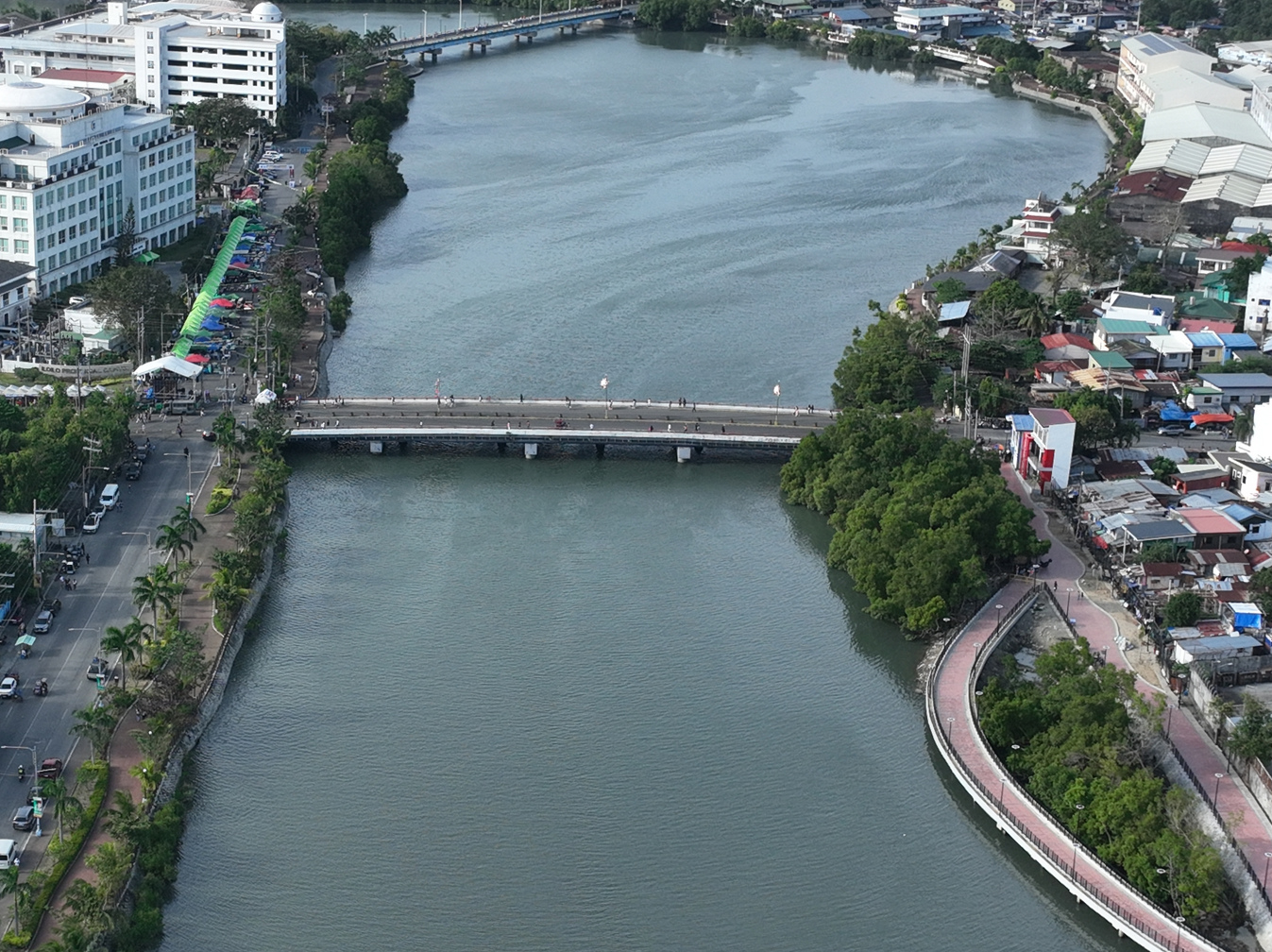
- Coordinates: 10°42′6.77″N 122°34′13.16″E
- Carries: Motor vehicles, pedestrians and bicycles
- Crosses: Iloilo River
- Locale: Iloilo City, Philippines
- Named for: Elpidio Quirino; Fernando Lopez
- Maintained by: Iloilo City Government; Department of Public Works and Highways - Iloilo City District Engineering Office
- Preceded by: Drilon Bridge
- Followed by: Muelle Loney (Rizal) Bridge

Characteristics
- Design: Girder bridge
- Material: Reinforced concrete
- Total length: 110 m (360 ft)
- Width: 17.21 m (56.5 ft)
- Traversable?: yes
- No. of spans: 5
- Piers in water: 4
- Clearance below: 8.72 m (29 ft) at mean tide
- No. of lanes: 4 (2 per direction)

History
- Inaugurated: 1967
- Rebuilt: 2000

Location
- Interactive map of Quirino–Lopez Bridge

The Quirino–Lopez Bridge is a girder bridge that crosses the Iloilo River in Iloilo City, Philippines. It connects the districts of City Proper and Lapuz. Completed in 1967, the bridge spans a southbound canal historically used for sugar transport. The canal also served as a port for sea-going vessels that ferried sugar cane, originating from a facility built by Nicholas Loney in 1926.

The bridge is named after President Elpidio Quirino and Vice President Fernando Lopez.

== See also ==
- Forbes Bridge
