= Iloilo Sunset Boulevard =

Road in Iloilo, Philippines

- Iloilo River North Bank Road
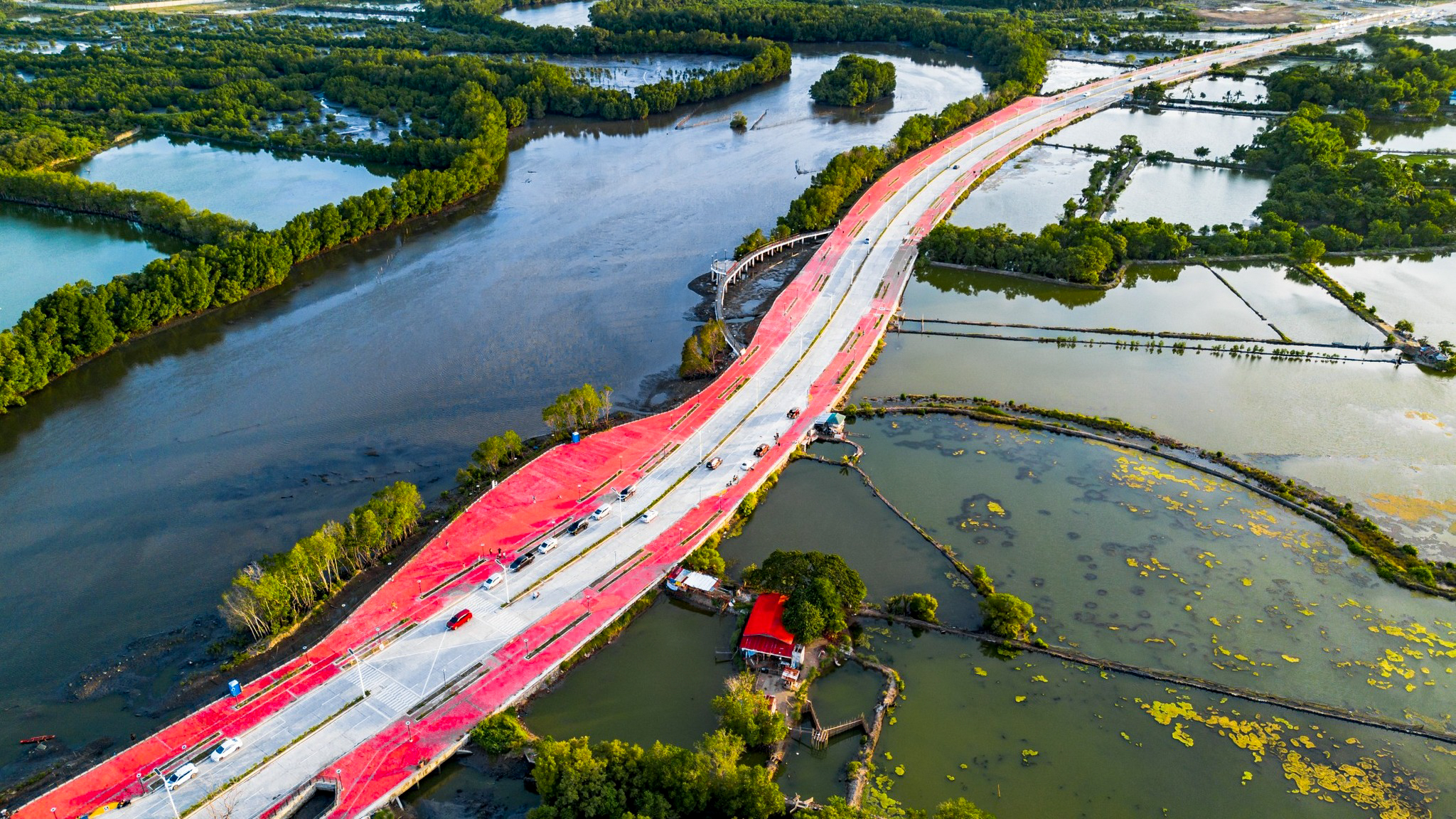
- Maintained by: Department of Public Works and Highways
- Length: 4.99 km (3.10 mi)
- East end: Sunset Boulevard North in Mandurriao, Iloilo City
- Major junctions: N512 (President Corazon C. Aquino Avenue) in Arevalo, Iloilo City
- West end: Calajunan Road in Oton

Construction
- Inauguration: 2024

Iloilo Sunset Boulevard, also called Iloilo River North Bank Road, is a 4.99-kilometre (3.10 mi) four-lane thoroughfare extending from Barangay Tabucan in Mandurriao, Iloilo City, to Barangay Cagbang in Oton, Iloilo, Philippines. It was opened in January 2025 and is expected to alleviate traffic congestion along the Iloilo-Antique Road in the Molo and Arevalo districts. The boulevard begins at the Sunset Boulevard North, south of the Iloilo Business Park, and runs along the north bank of the Iloilo River, extending to the southern municipalities of Iloilo province. The infrastructure includes designated pedestrian sidewalks, viewing decks, dedicated bicycle lanes on both sides, and an extension of the Iloilo River Esplanade. It is named and inspired by Billy Wilder's 1950 film of the same name Sunset Boulevard.

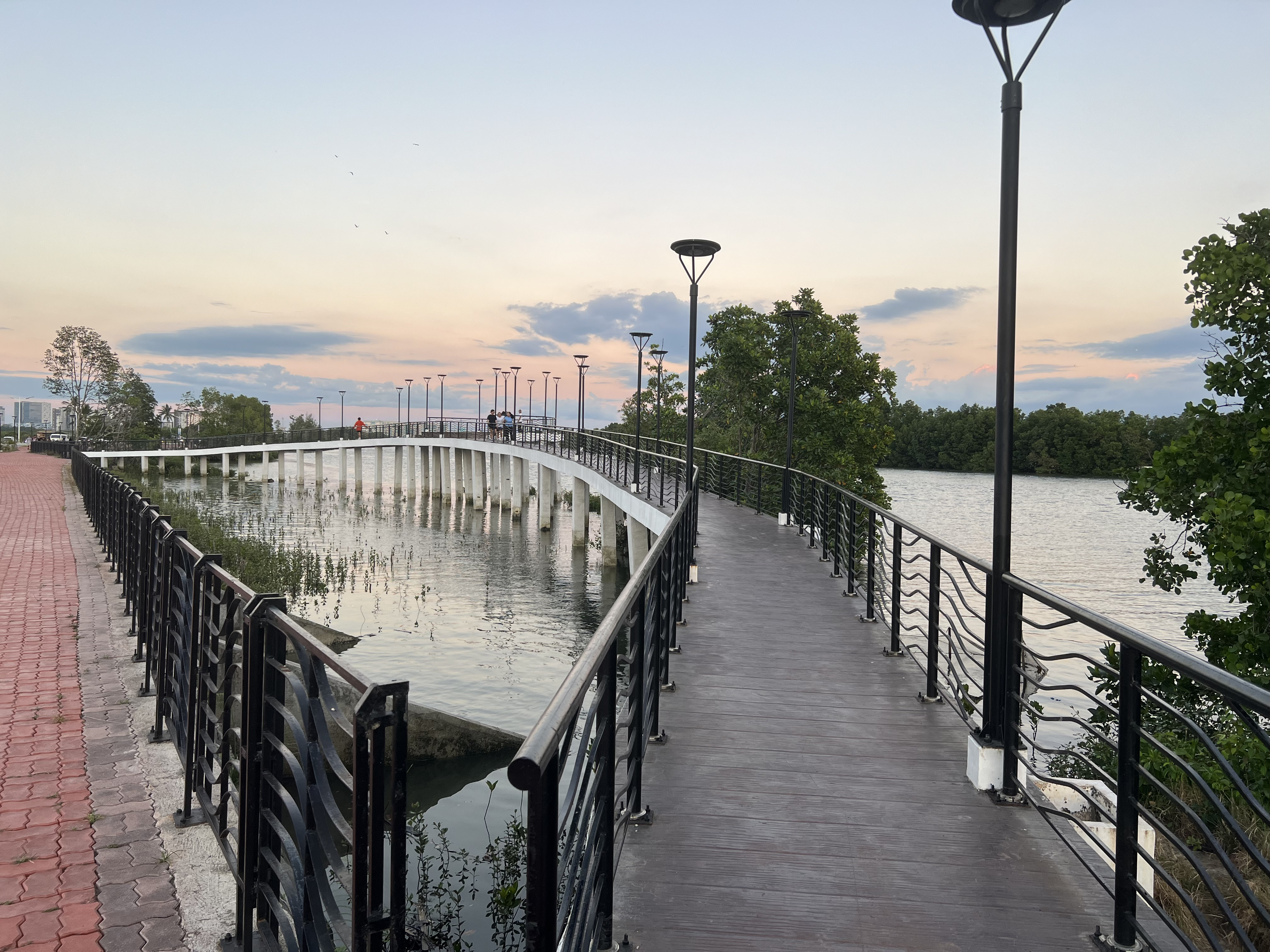
A bridge within the boulevard extending to the Iloilo River with a viewing deck in the middle

An extension of the boulevard up to Radial Road 1 is currently under construction, as of 2025.
