= Batiano River =

River in Iloilo, Philippines

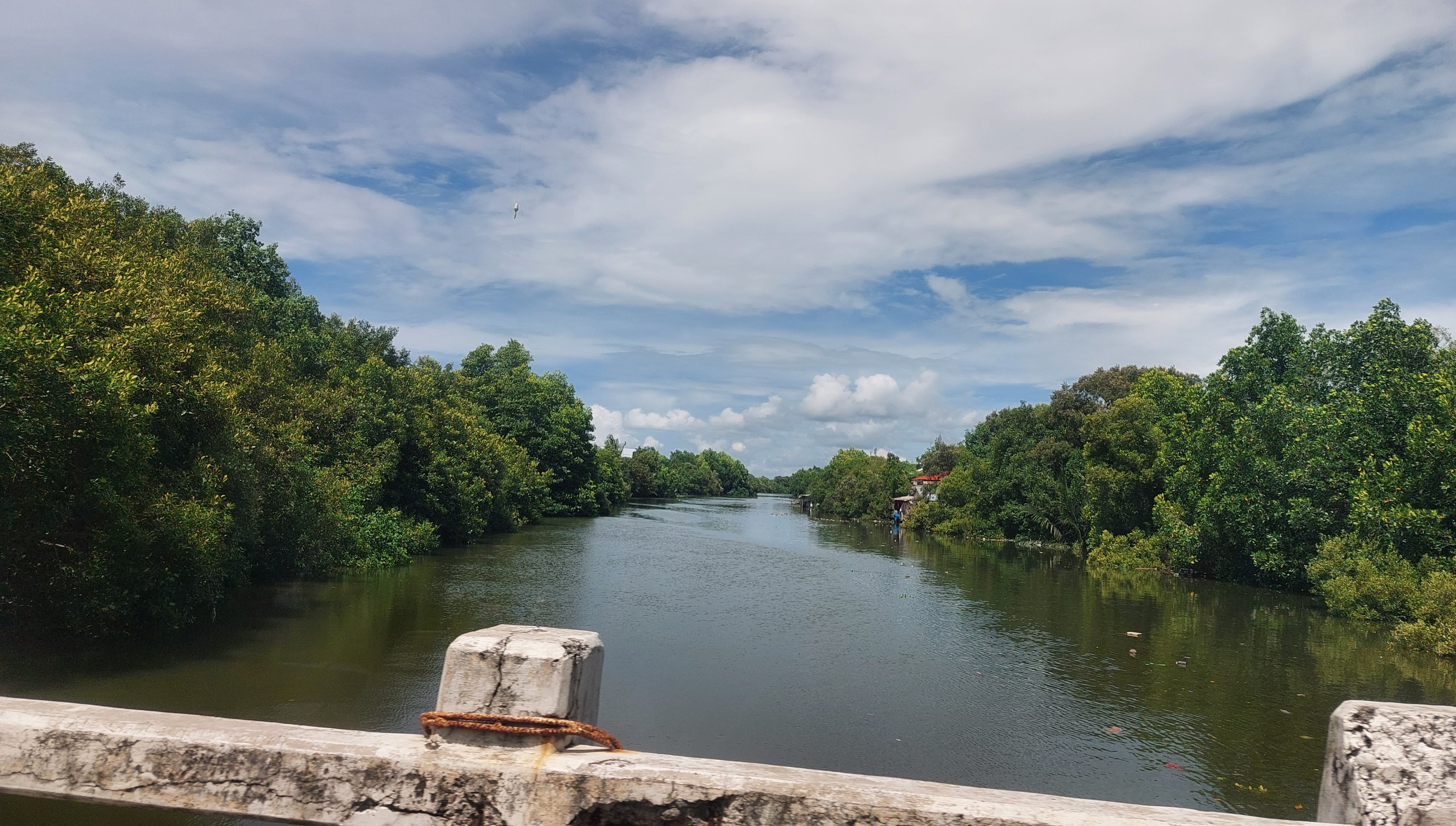
- Batiano River in Molo, Iloilo City

- Batiano River mouth Batiano River (Philippines)

Location
- Country: Philippines
- Region: Western Visayas
- Province: Iloilo
- City/municipality: Iloilo City

Physical characteristics
- Source
  - location: Oton
- Mouth: Iloilo Strait
  - location: Iloilo City
  - coordinates: 10°41′18″N 122°33′15″E
- Length: 17.5 km (10.9 mi)
- Basin size: 95.1 km^{2} (36.7 sq mi)

Basin features
- Progression: Batiano River – Iloilo Strait

The Batiano River is a river located in the province of Iloilo, in Western Visayas, Philippines. The river originates in the Iloilo-Batiano River Basin in Oton and flows to the Molo district of Iloilo City, which then empties into the Iloilo Strait. It has a basin size of 95.1 square kilometres (36.7 sq mi) and an approximate length of 17.5 kilometres (10.9 mi).

== See also ==
- Iloilo River
