= Carpenter Bridge (Iloilo) =

(New) Carpenter Bridge
- The new (left) and old (right) Carpenter Bridges
- Coordinates: 10°42′0.47″N 122°32′32.97″E
- Carries: 2 lanes of vehicles, pedestrians, and bicycles
- Crosses: Iloilo River
- Locale: Iloilo City, Philippines
- Named for: Frank Watson Carpenter
- Maintained by: Iloilo City Government; Department of Public Works and Highways - Iloilo City District Engineering Office
- Preceded by: Old Carpenter Bridge
- Followed by: Iloilo Bridge II

Characteristics
- Design: Beam bridge
- Material: Reinforced concrete
- Total length: 115 m (377 ft)
- Width: 12.1 m (40 ft)
- Traversable?: yes
- No. of spans: 4
- Piers in water: 3
- Clearance below: 6.1 m (20 ft) at mean tide
- No. of lanes: 2 (1 per direction)

History
- Inaugurated: 2008

Location
- Interactive map of (New) Carpenter Bridge

Old Carpenter Bridge
- Coordinates: 10°42′00″N 122°32′33″E
- Carries: Pedestrians
- Crosses: Iloilo River
- Locale: Iloilo City, Philippines
- Maintained by: Iloilo City Government; Department of Public Works and Highways - Iloilo City District Engineering Office
- Preceded by: Iloilo Bridge
- Followed by: New Carpenter Bridge

Characteristics
- Design: Beam bridge
- Material: Reinforced concrete
- Traversable?: yes

History
- Inaugurated: 1911

Location
- Interactive map of Old Carpenter Bridge

The Carpenter Bridge is a pair of bridges spanning the Iloilo River in Iloilo City, Philippines, consisting of the original bridge, which has been converted into a pedestrian walkway and is part of the Iloilo River Esplanade, and the new bridge, which serves vehicle traffic. It was named after Governor Frank Watson Carpenter, the first civilian governor of the Moro Province (Department of Mindanao and Sulu) in Mindanao.

The original Carpenter Bridge is one of the oldest bridges in Iloilo City, spanning the Iloilo River.

== History ==
The original Carpenter Bridge was built in 1911 during the American colonial period, replacing a bamboo bridge that connected Molo and Mandurriao. In the 2000s, the bridge faced structural issues and was rehabilitated rather than demolished due to its historical value. It was subsequently transformed into a promenade, connecting the Iloilo River Esplanade on both sides of the river.

In 2008, a new two-lane bridge was constructed adjacent to the old bridge to accommodate passing vehicles.

== See also ==
- Iloilo River Esplanade
