= Paulo Alcazaren =

Filipino landscape architect, urban designer, and writer

Paulo G. Alcazaren
- Born: Argao, Cebu, Philippines
- Education: University of the Philippines Diliman; National University of Singapore
- Occupation: Architect
- Awards: Gawad CCP Para sa Sining (2015)
- Practice: PGAA Creative Design
- Projects: Iloilo River Esplanade

Paulo G. Alcazaren (born 1955, Cebu) is a Filipino landscape architect, urban designer, environmental planner, writer, and editor. He is the principal of PGAA Creative Design, a multidisciplinary practice involved in landscape architecture, urban design, and environmental planning. His projects include the Iloilo River Esplanade, a riverfront linear park in Iloilo City.

In addition to his design practice, Alcazaren has written the City Sense column for The Philippine Star and served as editor-in-chief of the Philippine architecture and design publication BluPrint from 2002 to 2012. He returned to the position in February 2026.

== Early life and education ==
Alcazaren was born in Argao, Cebu, and moved to Quezon City before he was two years old. He completed degrees in architecture and landscape architecture at the University of the Philippines Diliman and earned a master's degree in urban design from the National University of Singapore.

== Design career ==
While studying, Alcazaren apprenticed in the offices of Filipino architects Cesar Concio and Felipe Mendoza. From 1978 to 1982, he worked with National Artist for Architecture Ildefonso P. Santos Jr., after which he helped establish a landscape architecture practice in 1982.

Alcazaren later established the practice's Singapore and Kuala Lumpur offices in 1989 and 1992, respectively. Its Philippine operations subsequently continued as PGAA Creative Design, with Alcazaren as principal.

=== Iloilo River Esplanade ===
Alcazaren designed the initial phase of the Iloilo River Esplanade as part of the rehabilitation of the Iloilo River. The first section consisted of a 1.2-kilometre pedestrian promenade and was inaugurated on August 18, 2012. Subsequent extensions developed the esplanade into a linear park extending for more than nine kilometres along the river.

In 2018, the National Commission for Culture and the Arts recognised the esplanade with a Haligi ng Dangal award for landscape architecture.

== Writing, publishing, and exhibitions ==
Alcazaren began writing the City Sense column for The Philippine Star in 1999. The column covers architecture, heritage conservation, urban history, parks, and city planning. His articles and public commentary have frequently addressed the conservation of historic buildings and districts and the provision of public open spaces in Philippine cities.

Alcazaren was editor-in-chief of BluPrint from 2002 to 2012, during which the publication expanded its coverage of Philippine architecture, landscape architecture, interiors, and urban design. In February 2026, its publisher announced his return as editor-in-chief.

In 2023, the Metropolitan Museum of Manila presented Places of Memory, Places of the Heart: Plazas in the Philippines, an exhibition based on Alcazaren's documentation of public plazas in 16 Philippine towns and cities.

== Public service ==
Alcazaren has served as chairperson of the Professional Regulation Commission's Board of Landscape Architecture. PRC records list him as chairperson from 2016 through 2022, and the commission's announcement of the July 2024 landscape-architect licensure examination also identified him as chairman of the board.

== Awards and recognition ==
In 2001, Alcazaren received an Alab ng Haraya award from the National Commission for Culture and the Arts in the category covering published articles on culture and the arts, cultural journalism, and documentation.

In 2002, the Professional Regulation Commission named him Professional of the Year for Landscape Architecture.

In 2015, he received the Gawad CCP Para sa Sining for architecture. The award is the highest distinction conferred by the Cultural Center of the Philippines on Filipino artists and cultural workers.

== Selected works ==
- Alcazaren, Paulo G.; Cruz, Isagani R.; Sta. Maria, Felice Prudente; Quezon, Manuel L. III; Samson, Regina A. (2010). Quezon City: The Rise of Asia's City of the Future. Quezon City: Studio 5 Designs. ISBN 9789719420651.
- Alcazaren, Paulo; Ferrer, Luis; Icamina, Benvenuto (2011). Lungsod Iskwater: The Evolution of Informality as a Dominant Pattern in Philippine Cities. Mandaluyong: Anvil Publishing. ISBN 9789712725029.
- Alcazaren, Paulo, ed. (2013). Parks for a Nation: The Rizal Park and 50 Years of the National Parks Development Committee. Quezon City: Media Wise Communications. ISBN 9789719446569.
