= Iloilo River =

River in Iloilo, Philippines

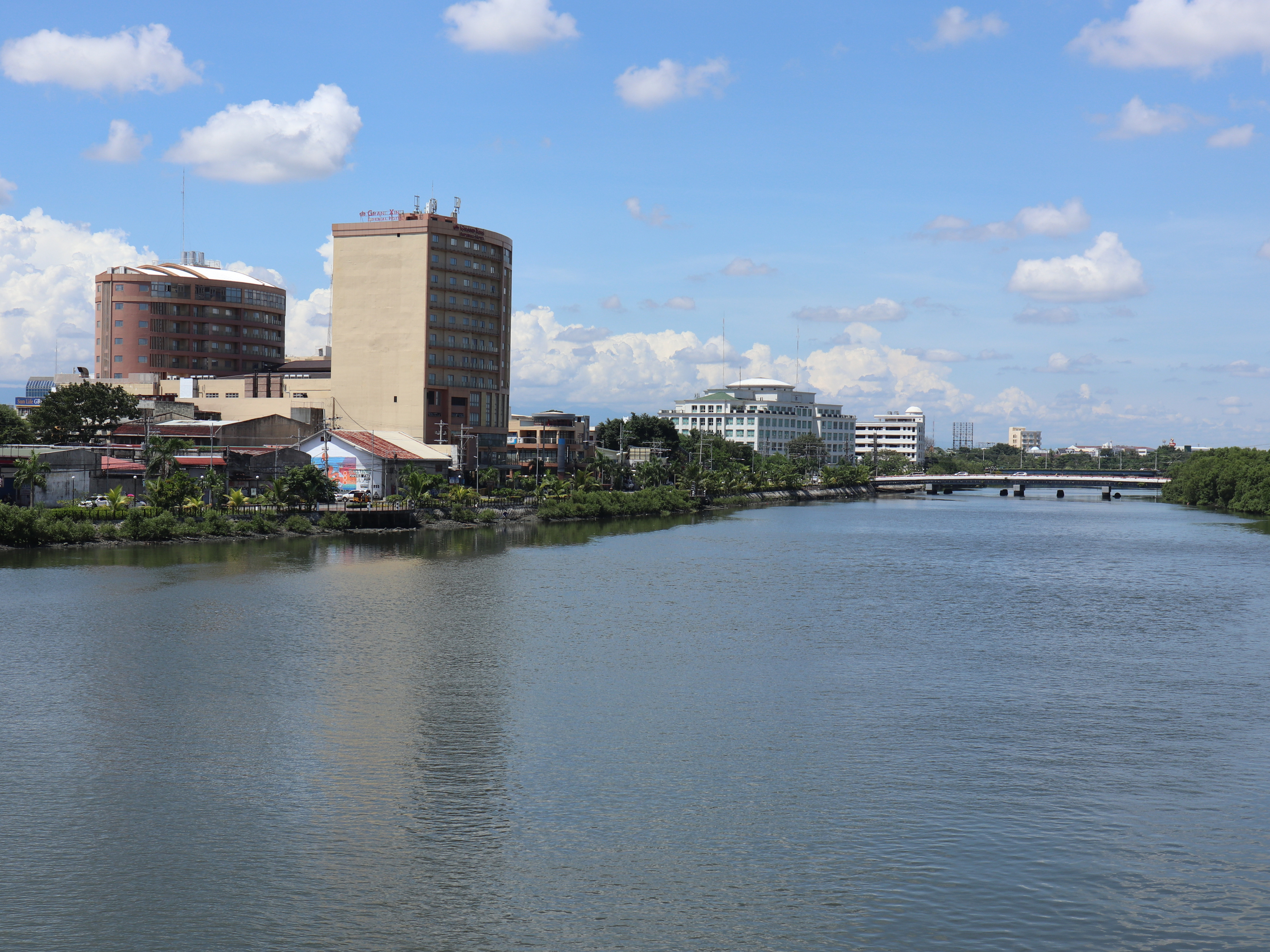
- Iloilo River in Iloilo City Proper

- Iloilo River mouth Iloilo River (Philippines)
- Native name: Subâ sang Iloilo (Hiligaynon)

Location
- Country: Philippines
- Region: Western Visayas
- Province: Iloilo
- City/municipality: Iloilo City; Oton

Physical characteristics
- Source: Iloilo-Batiano River Basin
  - location: Oton
- Mouth: Iloilo Strait
  - location: Iloilo City
  - coordinates: 10°41′34″N 122°35′05″E
- Length: 26.4 km (16.4 mi)
- Basin size: 82.5 sq.kilometres (31.8 sq. miles)

Basin features
- Progression: Iloilo River – Iloilo Strait
- Bridges: 11

The Iloilo River is an estuarine river located in the southeastern part of the province of Iloilo, in Western Visayas, Philippines. The river starts in Oton at the Batiano estuary, then traverses through the Iloilo City districts of Arevalo, Molo, Mandurriao, La Paz, Lapuz, and the City Proper, before emptying into the Iloilo Strait.

As an estuary, the river level fluctuates with the tides. This flow brings in nutrients from the sea, which makes the Iloilo River a nursery for fish species such as bangus and tilapia. The banks of the river are home to 22 of the country's 35 mangrove species, as well as the rare metapenaeus insolitus.

== Wharf ==
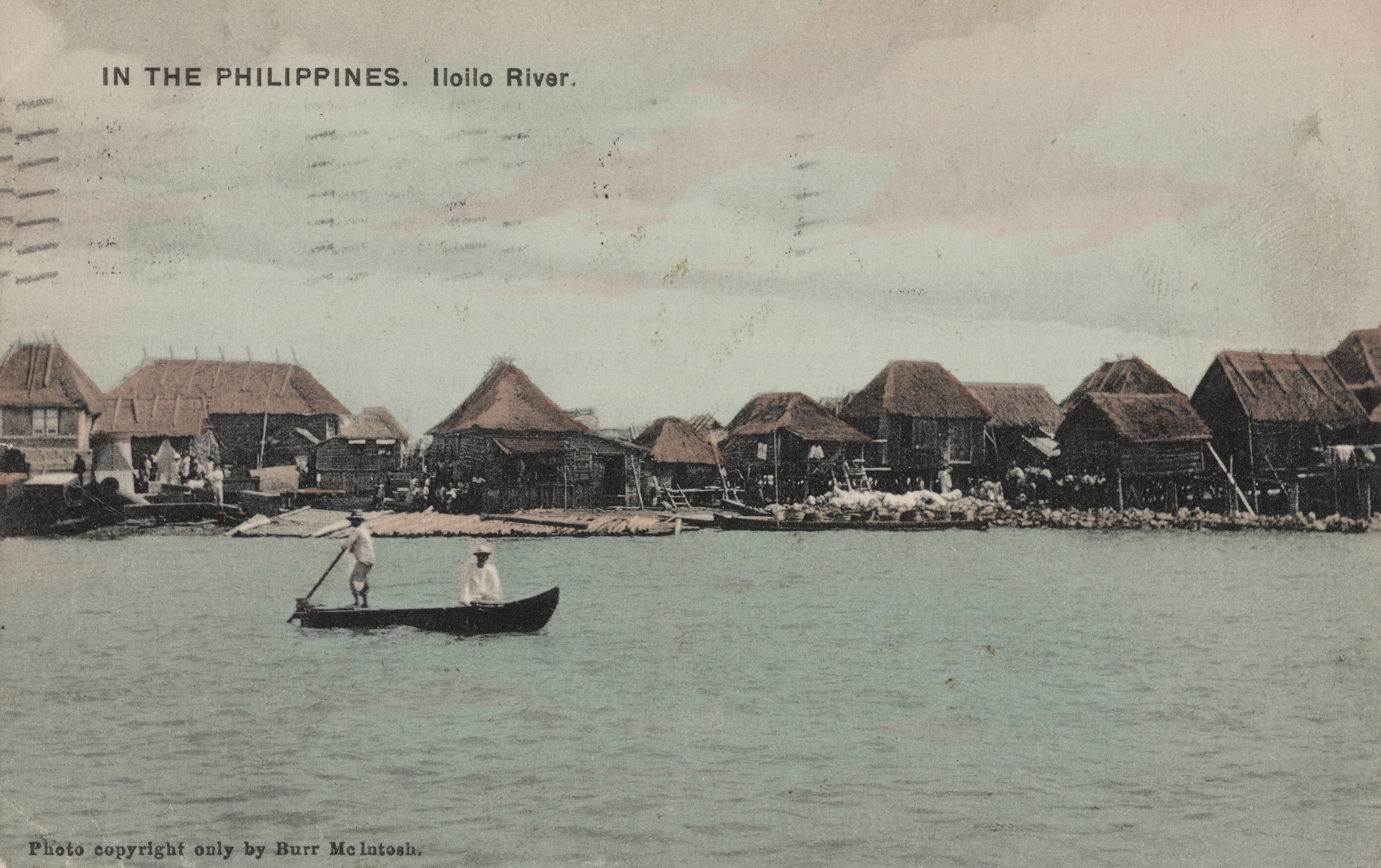
The Iloilo River in 1905

Iloilo River wharf, including Muelle Loney Street in the Iloilo City Proper, is a natural harbor which made it a preferred port of call for ships seeking protection from strong winds and tropical monsoons. It serves as port for inter island ferries that travel from Iloilo City to Bacolod on Negros and to Guimaras. It is also a drop-off point for fishing vessels that bring in their catch from the sea to be delivered to markets all over Iloilo.

== Port ==
The Port of Iloilo was opened for international trade on 1855 and the coming of British Vice-consul Nicholas Loney, a year later, that led to the fast development of sugar industry in the region.

== Esplanade ==
The Iloilo River Esplanade is a park development stretches on both sides of the river banks constructed as a recreation area and an attraction for visitors.

== Bridges ==
The bridges that cross the river include, into City Proper the Quirino-Lopez Bridge (built 1967, rehabilitated 2000) going to Lapuz district and Forbes (1910, rehabilitated 1975), Jalandoni and Drilon bridges going to La Paz district; and Diversion Bridge (1982) and Carpenter Bridge (2010, replacing a now-pedestrian only bridge) between Mandurriao and Molo districts.

== Gallery ==
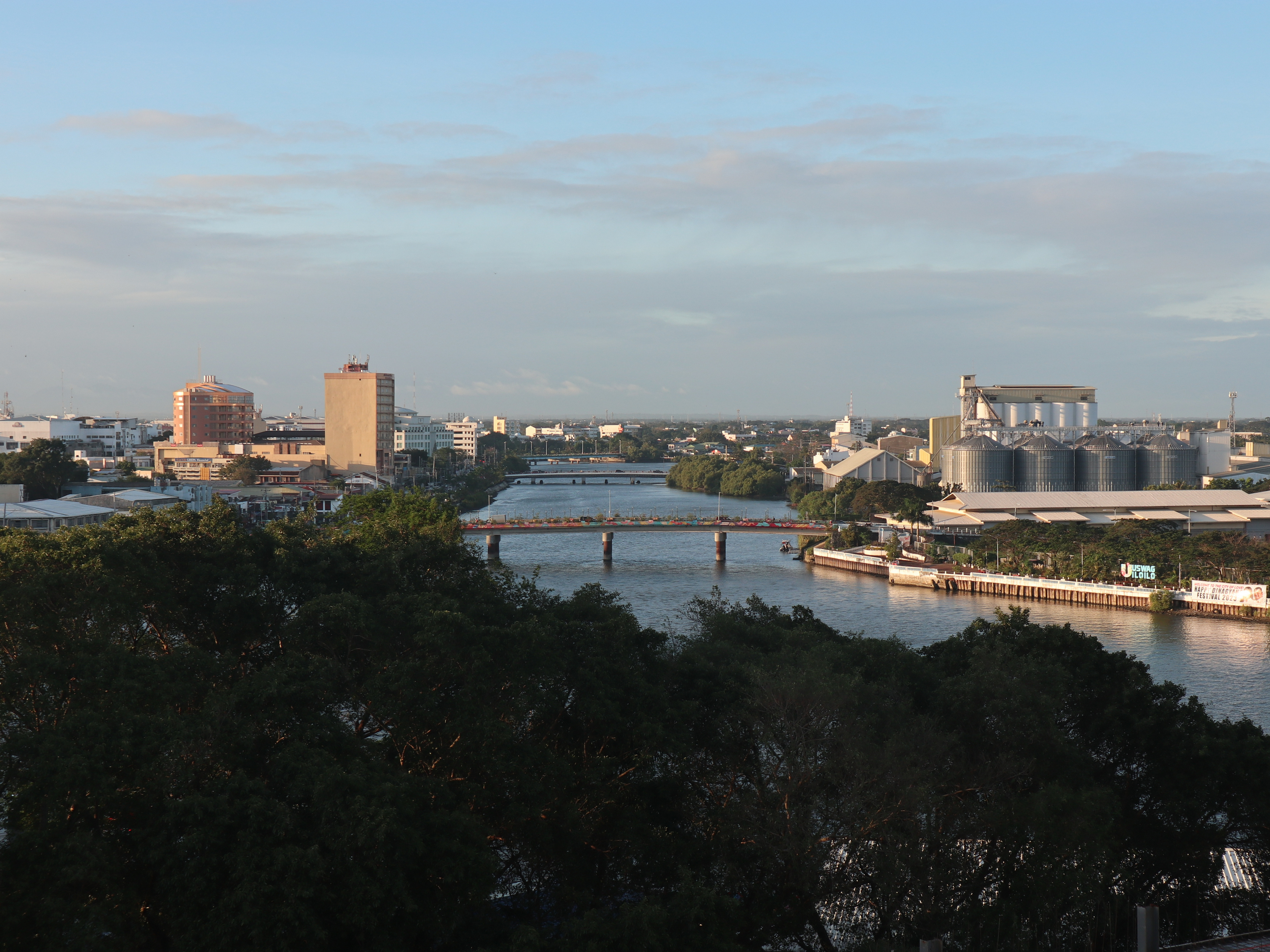
Aerial view of the Iloilo River from Iloilo City Hall.

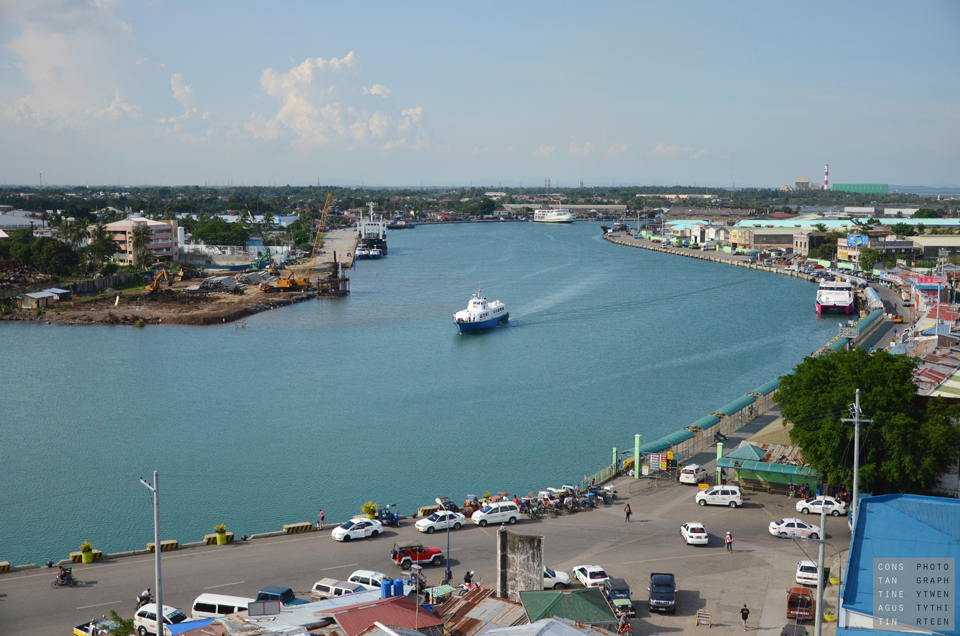
Muelle Loney Wharf near the old downtown Iloilo.

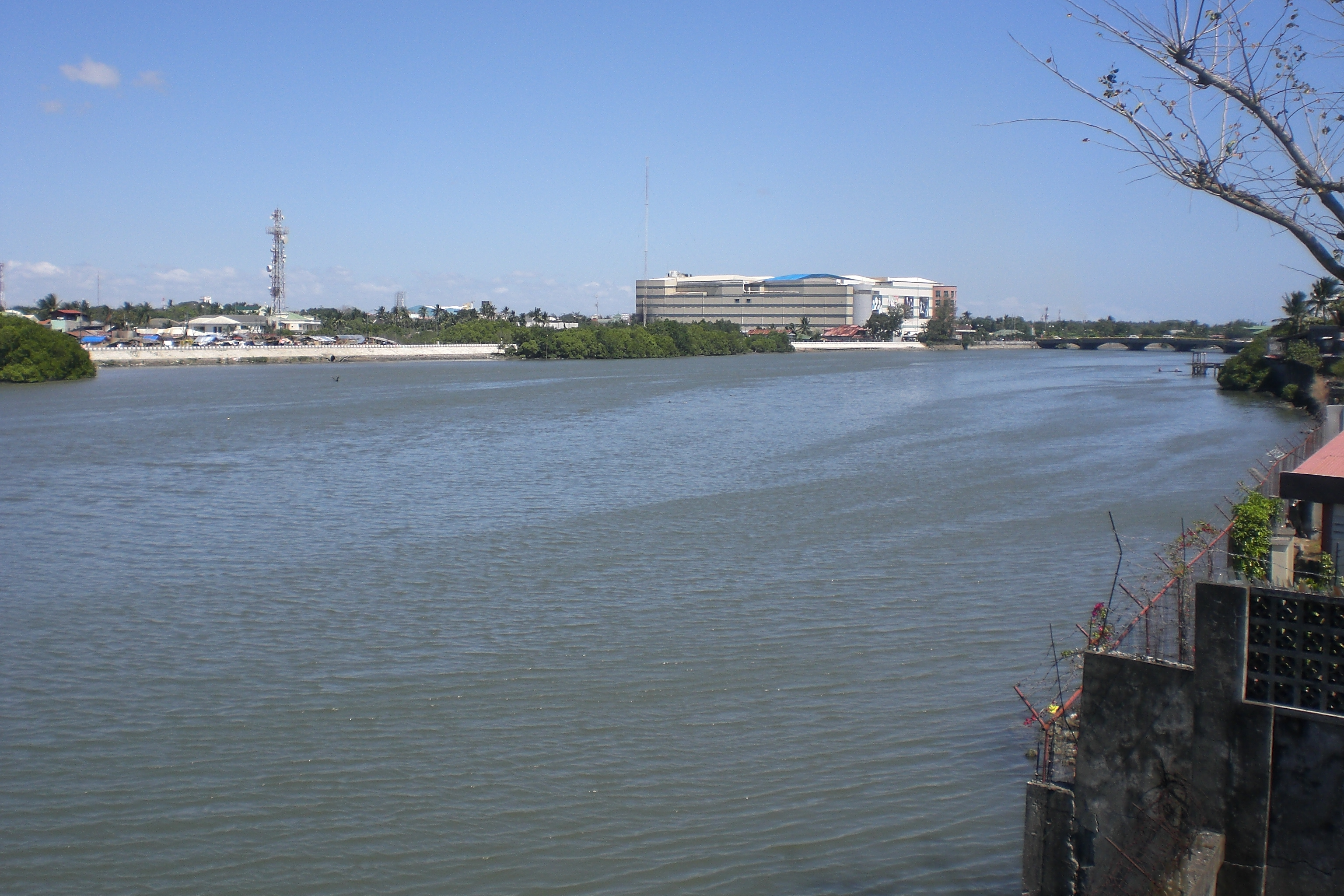
Iloilo River near La Paz district.

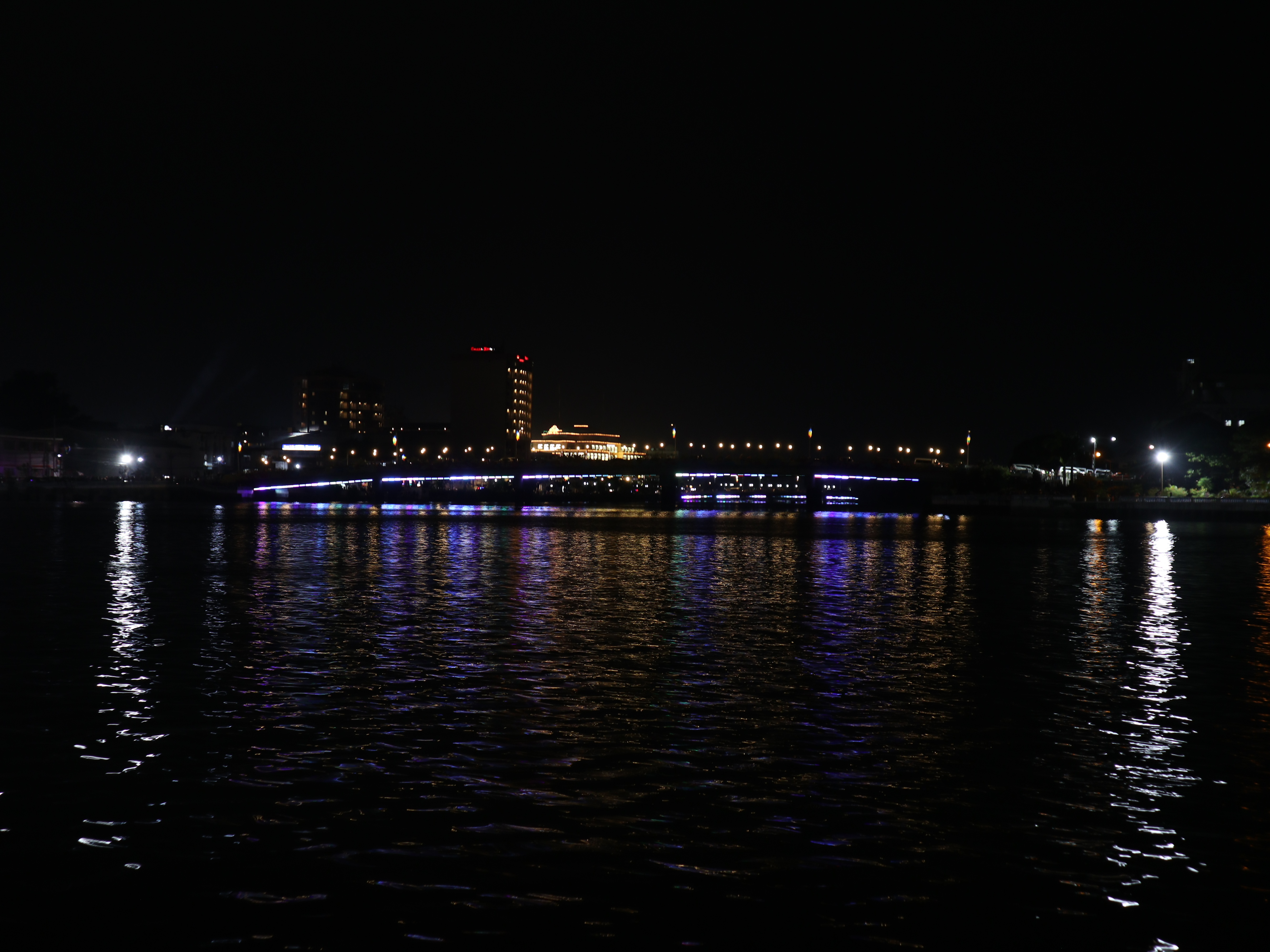
Iloilo River at night.

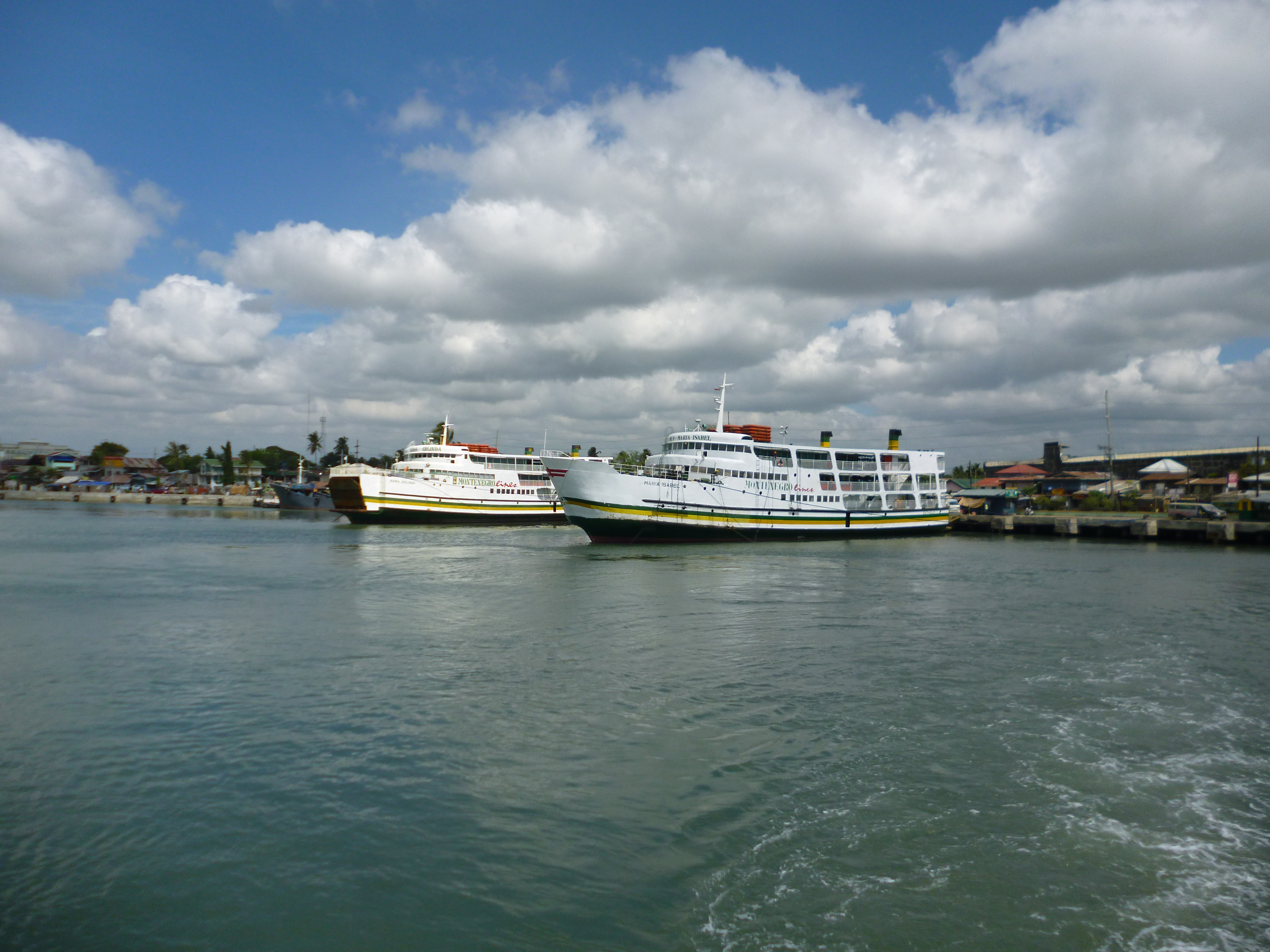
Ro-ro ferries in Lapuz district.

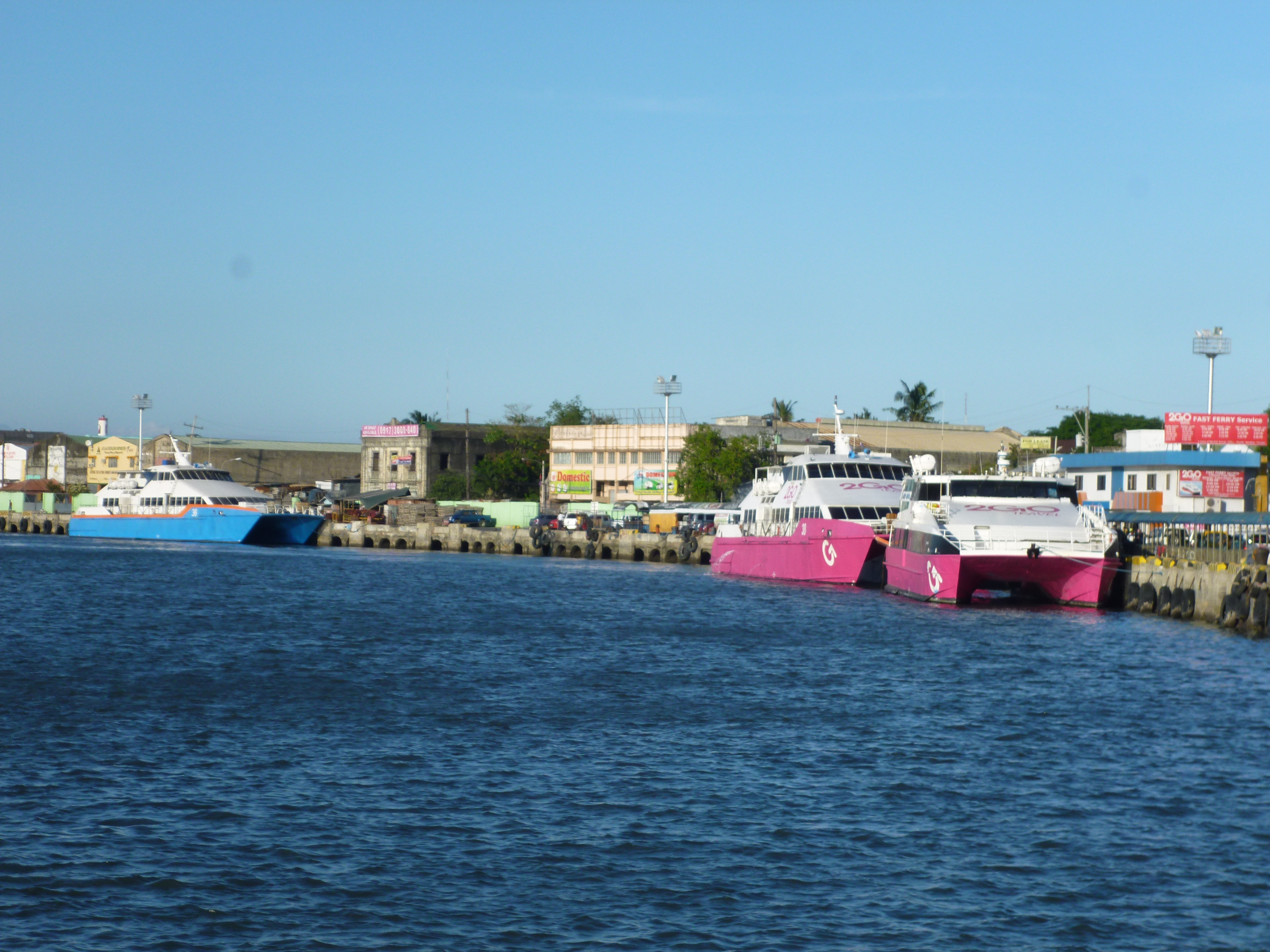
Fast craft ferries from 2GO Travel and Oceanjet at the fast ferry terminal on the Iloilo River, going to Bacolod.

== See also ==
- Iloilo River Esplanade
- Batiano River
