= Lapuz, Iloilo City =

District of Iloilo City, Philippines

Lapuz
- District of Iloilo City
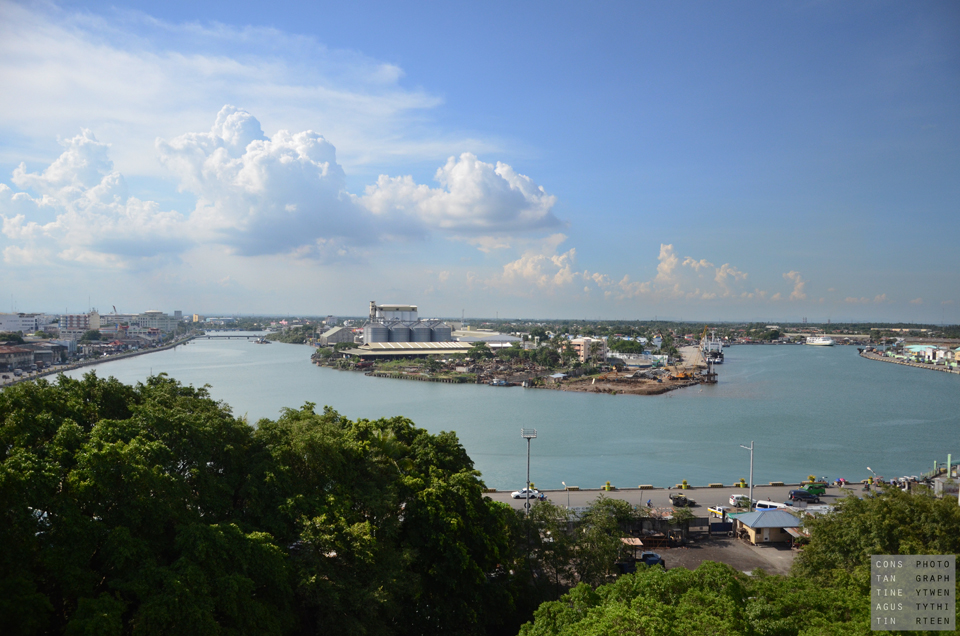
- Aerial view of Lapuz

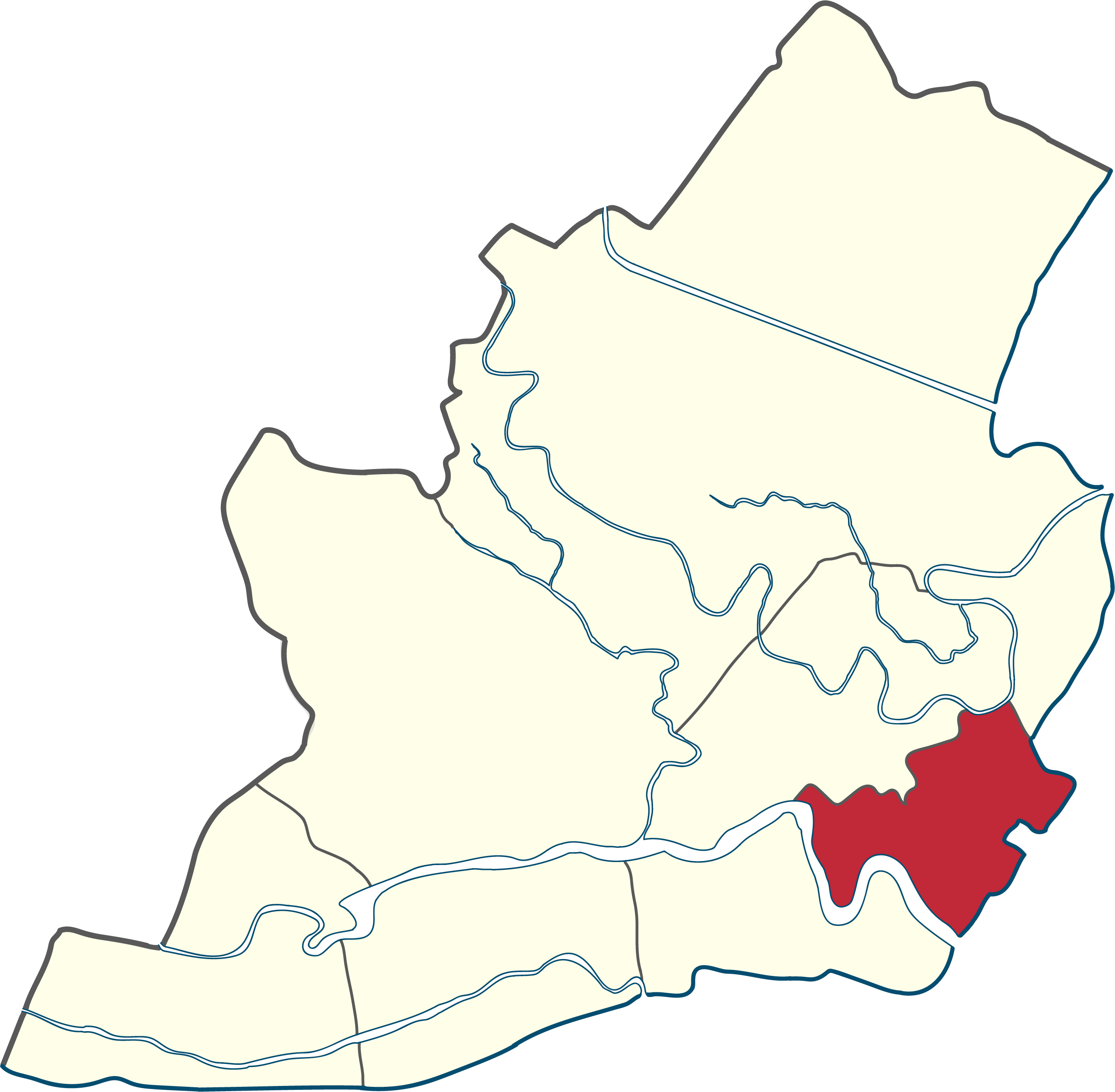
- Location within Iloilo City
- Interactive map of Lapuz
- Location in the Philippines Lapuz (Philippines)
- Coordinates: 10°42′14″N 122°34′53″E
- Country: Philippines
- Region: Western Visayas (Region VI)
- Province: Iloilo (geographically only)
- City: Iloilo City
- Congressional District: Lone district of Iloilo City
- Established: July 16, 1937
- Separation from La Paz: December 17, 2008
- Barangays: 12 (see Barangays)

Government
  - District ABC President: Arnel Asturias

Area
  - Total: 3.25 km^{2} (1.25 sq mi)

Population (2024 census)
  - Total: 31,603
  - Density: 9,720/km^{2} (25,200/sq mi)
- Demonym: Lapuznon
- Time zone: UTC+8 (Philippine Standard Time)
- ZIP code: 5000
- Area code: 33
- Patron saint: Nuestra Señora del Rosario (Our Lady of the Rosary)
- Feast day: October 12
- Native languages: Hiligaynon

Lapuz ([laˈpus]) is a district in Iloilo City, Philippines. It is the smallest district by geographical area as well as the least populous district, with 31,603 people in the 2024 census.

Lapuz is known for its transportation infrastructure, including the Visayas Container Terminal (VCT), a major cargo facility part of Port of Iloilo, as well as the Iloilo Fastcraft and roll-on/roll-off (RORO) terminals. It also hosts industries such as rice mills, the Shell oil depot, the Petron oil depot, and manufacturing corporations.

== Etymology ==
The name "Lapuz" is derived from its older name "Lapus-lapus", which came from the Hiligaynon word "lapus", which means "to insert/pass through" because of its location.

== History ==
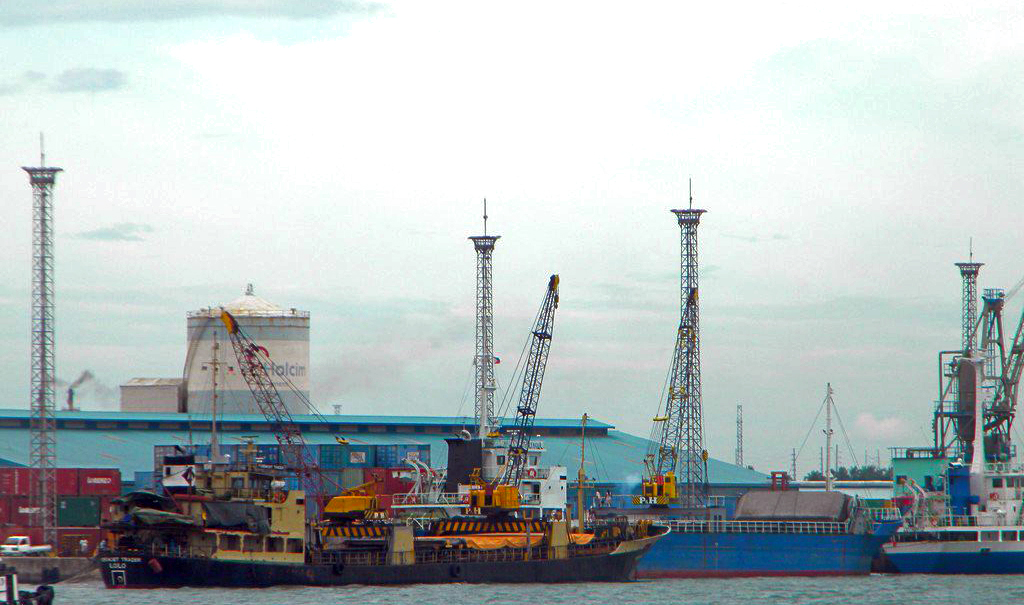
Iloilo International Port in Barangay Loboc

Lapuz was established as a sub-district during the Spanish colonial period, forming part of the larger La Paz district within Iloilo City. For several years before its official separation, it was de facto considered a district and had its own district president, like the other districts. On December 17, 2008, the Sangguniang Panglungsod (City Council) of Iloilo City passed a resolution granting Lapuz its own district status, making it the seventh and youngest district. The decision enabled Lapuz to have its own dedicated police station and fire station.

== Geography ==
Lapuz is the smallest district, covering 3.25 square kilometres (1.25 sq mi). It is 1.32 kilometres (0.82 mi) from Iloilo City Proper, making it the nearest district to the city center. It's bordered by La Paz to the north and the City Proper to the west. It also faces eastward across the Iloilo Strait at Guimaras Island.

=== Barangays ===
The district of Lapuz has a total of 12 barangays.

- Alalasan
- Bo. Obrero
- Don Esteban
- Jalandoni Estate
- Lapuz Norte
- Lapuz Sur
- Libertad
- Loboc
- Mansaya
- Progreso
- Punong
- Sinikway

== See also ==
- Port of Iloilo
