= Forbes Bridge =

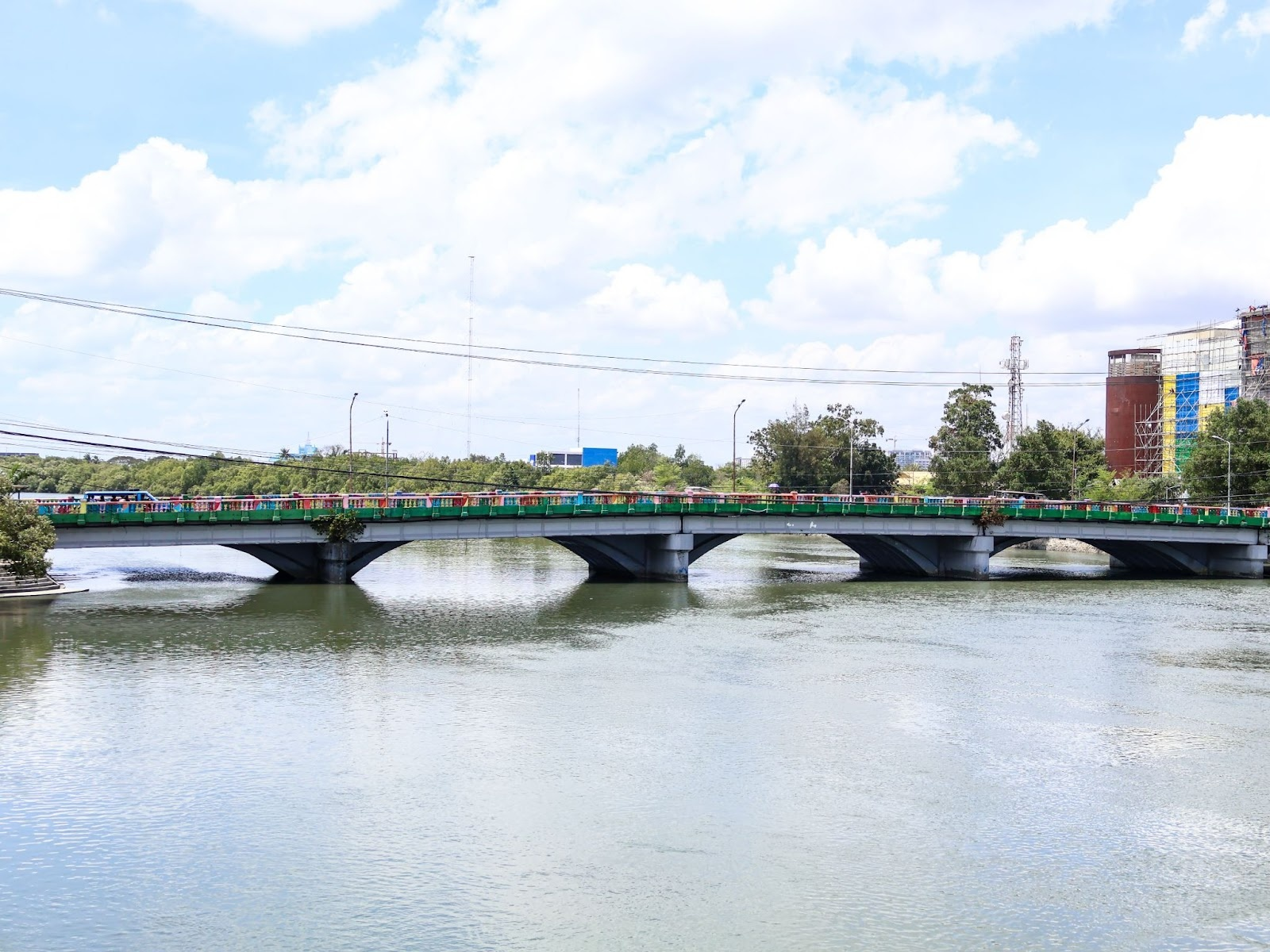
- The bridge in 2026
- Coordinates: 10°42′21″N 122°34′3″E
- Carries: Motor vehicles, pedestrians and bicycles
- Crosses: Iloilo River
- Locale: Iloilo City, Philippines
- Official name: Forbes Bridge
- Named for: William Cameron Forbes
- Maintained by: Iloilo City Government; Department of Public Works and Highways - Iloilo City District Engineering Office
- Preceded by: Muelle Loney (Rizal) Bridge
- Followed by: Jalandoni Bridge

Characteristics
- Design: Neoclassical arch bridge
- Material: Steel-reinforced concrete
- Total length: 127 m (417 ft)
- Width: 20.05 m (65.8 ft)
- Traversable?: yes
- No. of spans: 3
- Piers in water: 6
- Clearance below: 9.07 m (30 ft) at mean tide
- No. of lanes: 4 (2 per direction)

History
- Construction end: 1909
- Inaugurated: 1910
- Rebuilt: 1975
- Replaces: Jaro Bridge

Location
- Interactive map of Forbes Bridge

The Forbes Bridge is an arched girder bridge that spans the Iloilo River in Iloilo City, Philippines. It was constructed in 1909 to replace the wooden Jaro Bridge, which had been built in 1875. The bridge served as a vital link between the districts of La Paz and Iloilo City Proper. It is claimed to be the oldest concrete bridge in the country.

== History ==
During the Spanish colonial period, the estuary that meandered through Iloilo City was known as the Jaro River, as it marked the natural boundary for one of the original territories of the pueblo of Jaro. In 1587, a one-foot image of the Nuestra Señora de la Purificacion y Candelaria (Our Lady of Purification and Candles) was discovered in this body of water. Over time, the Jaro River came to be known as the Iloilo River.

The construction of the Forbes Bridge was considered a significant development during its time. An American newspaper described it as "one of the most important causeways yet constructed in the islands." The bridge was built by W. H. Lambert & Co. at a cost of P100,000 and was completed in 1910. It spanned a length of 127 meters.

In recognition of his contributions and leadership, the bridge was named after Governor General William Cameron Forbes. Governor General Forbes served as the Governor-General of the Philippines from 1909 to 1913. His name was bestowed upon the bridge to honor his role in the development and modernization of the region. The bridge was rehabilitated in 1975.

Forbes Bridge stands as a testament to the engineering prowess of its time and continues to serve as an important transportation route in Iloilo City. It holds historical significance as a symbol of the city's growth and development during the early 20th century.
