= Western Visayas =

Administrative region of the Philippines

Western Visayas Kabisay-an Nakatundan Kanlurang Visayas
- Region
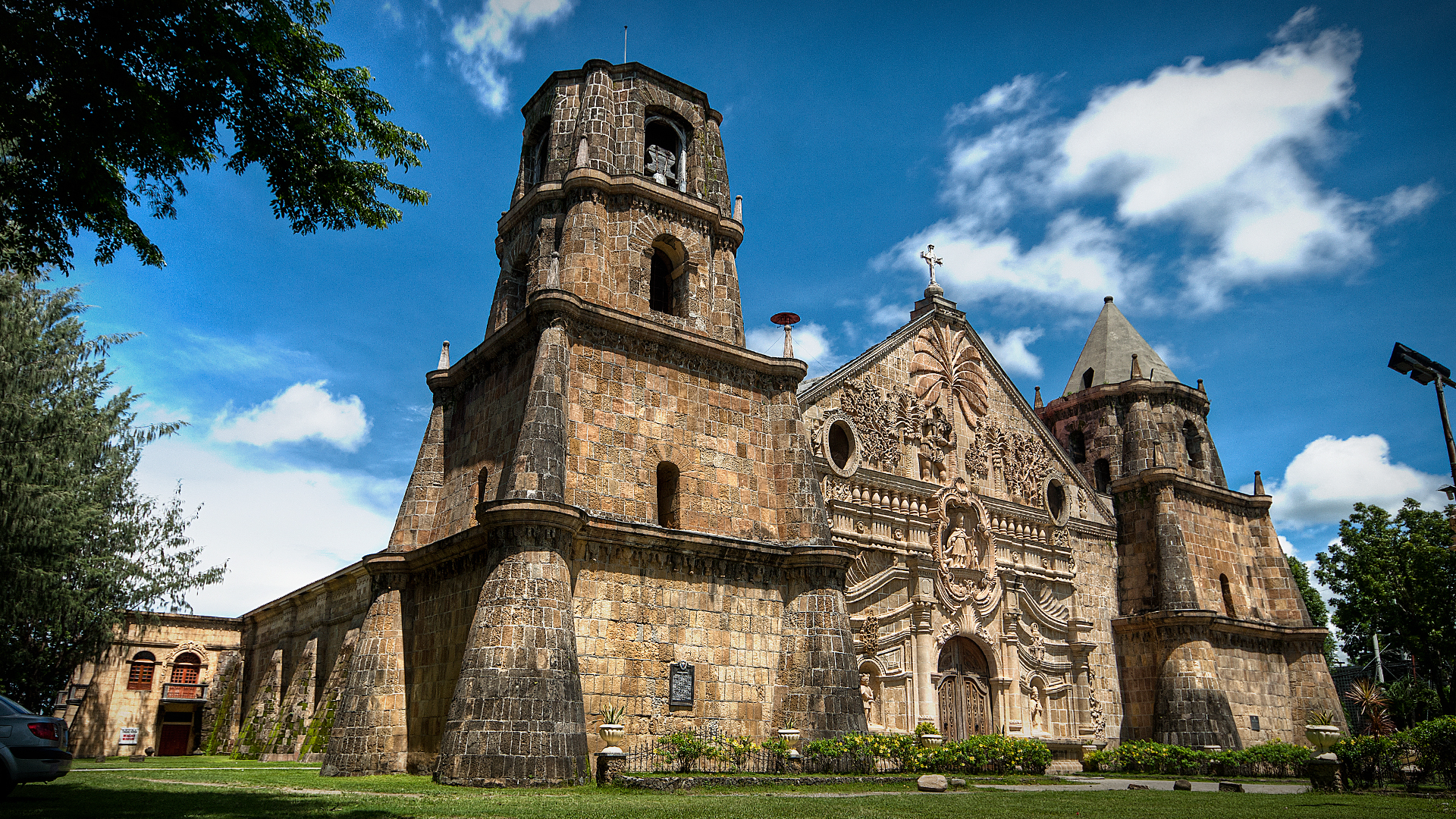
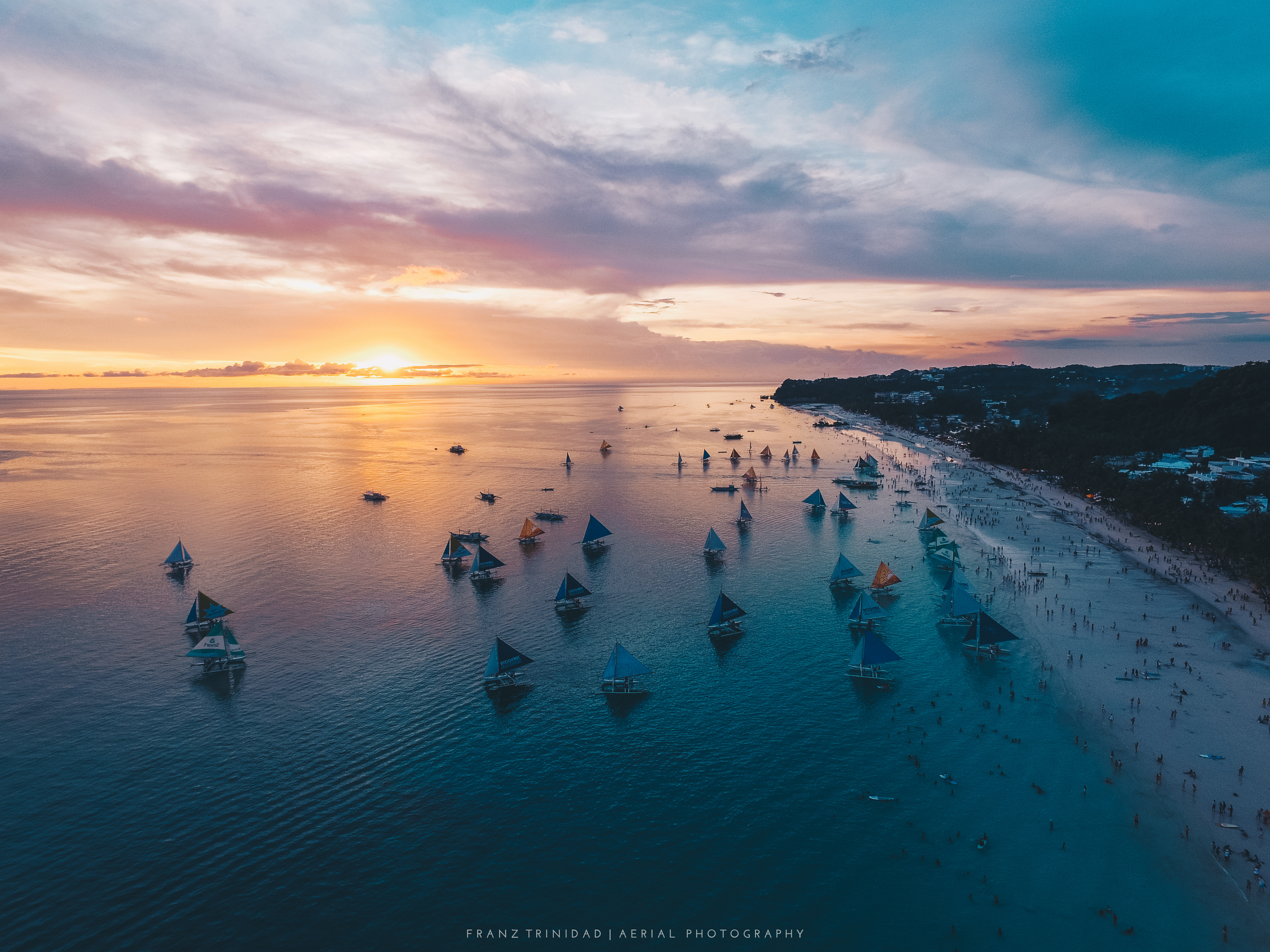
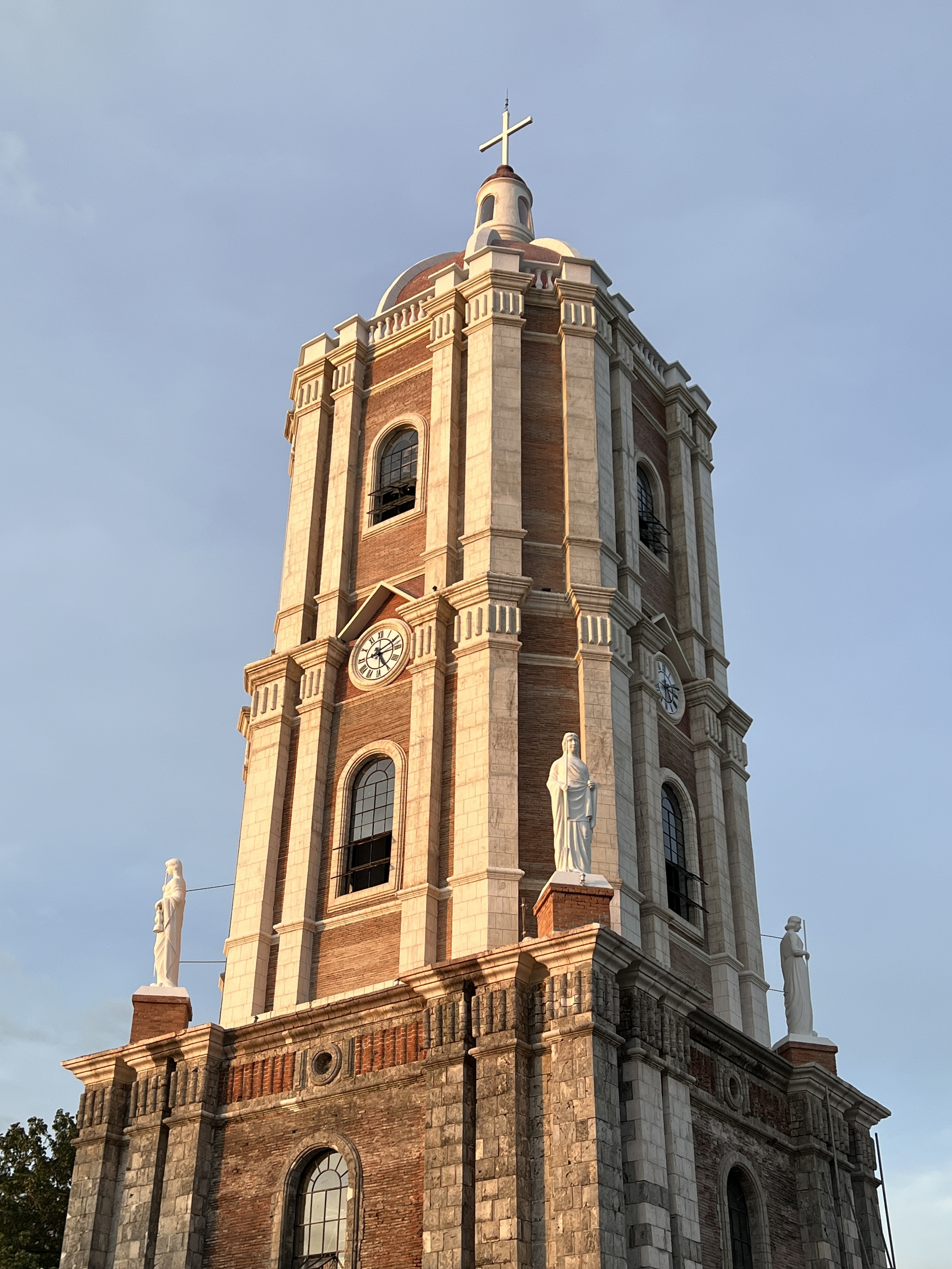
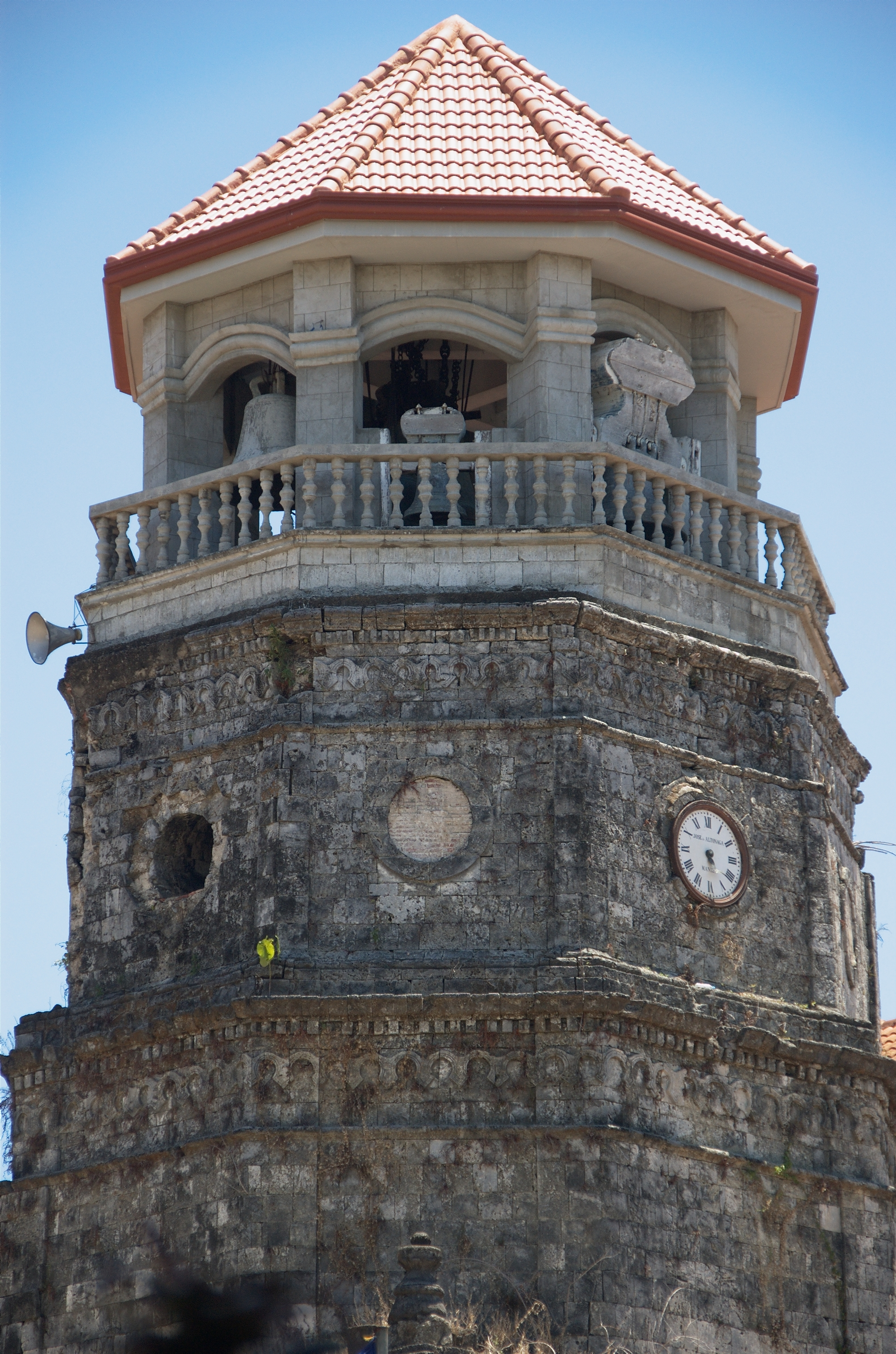
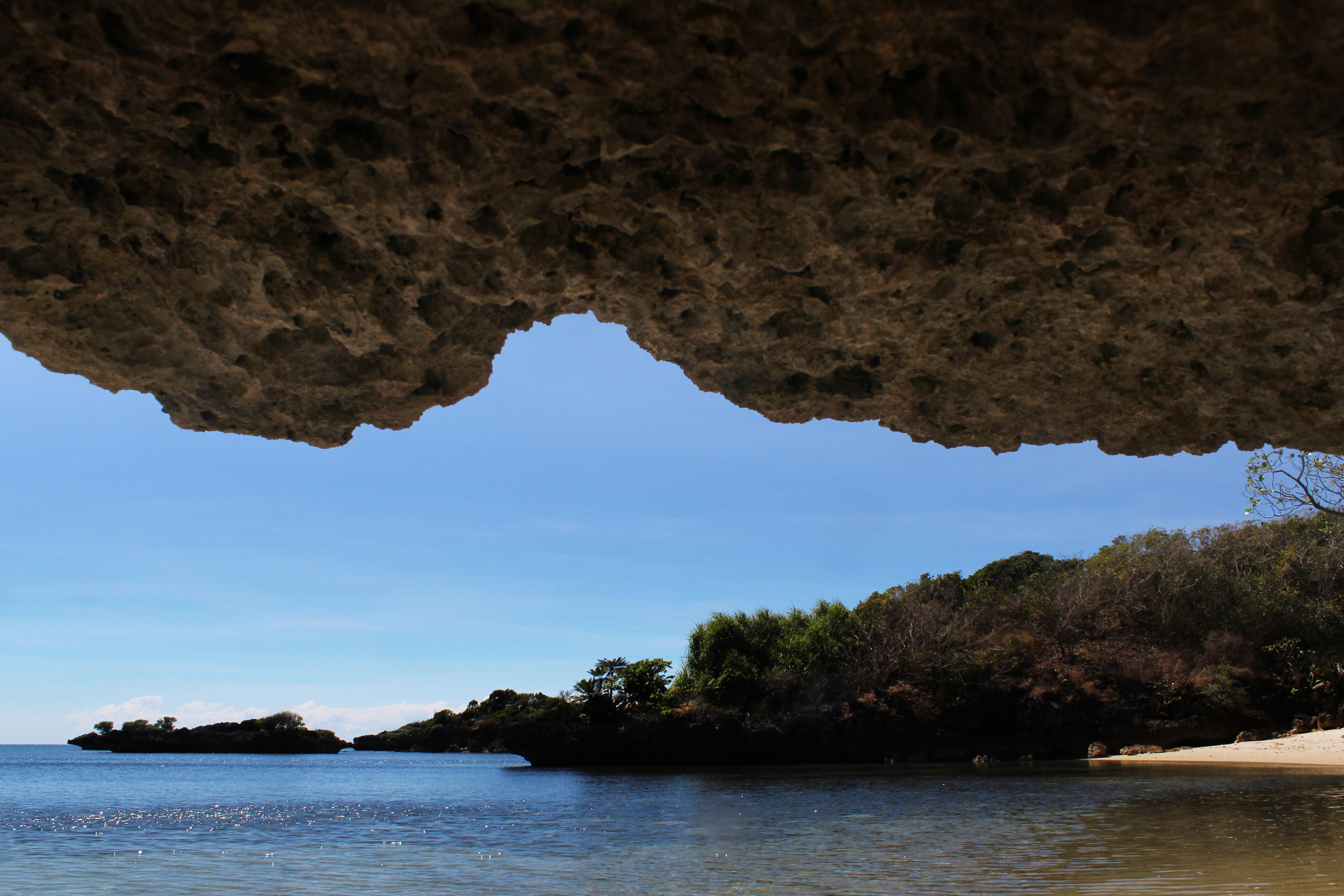
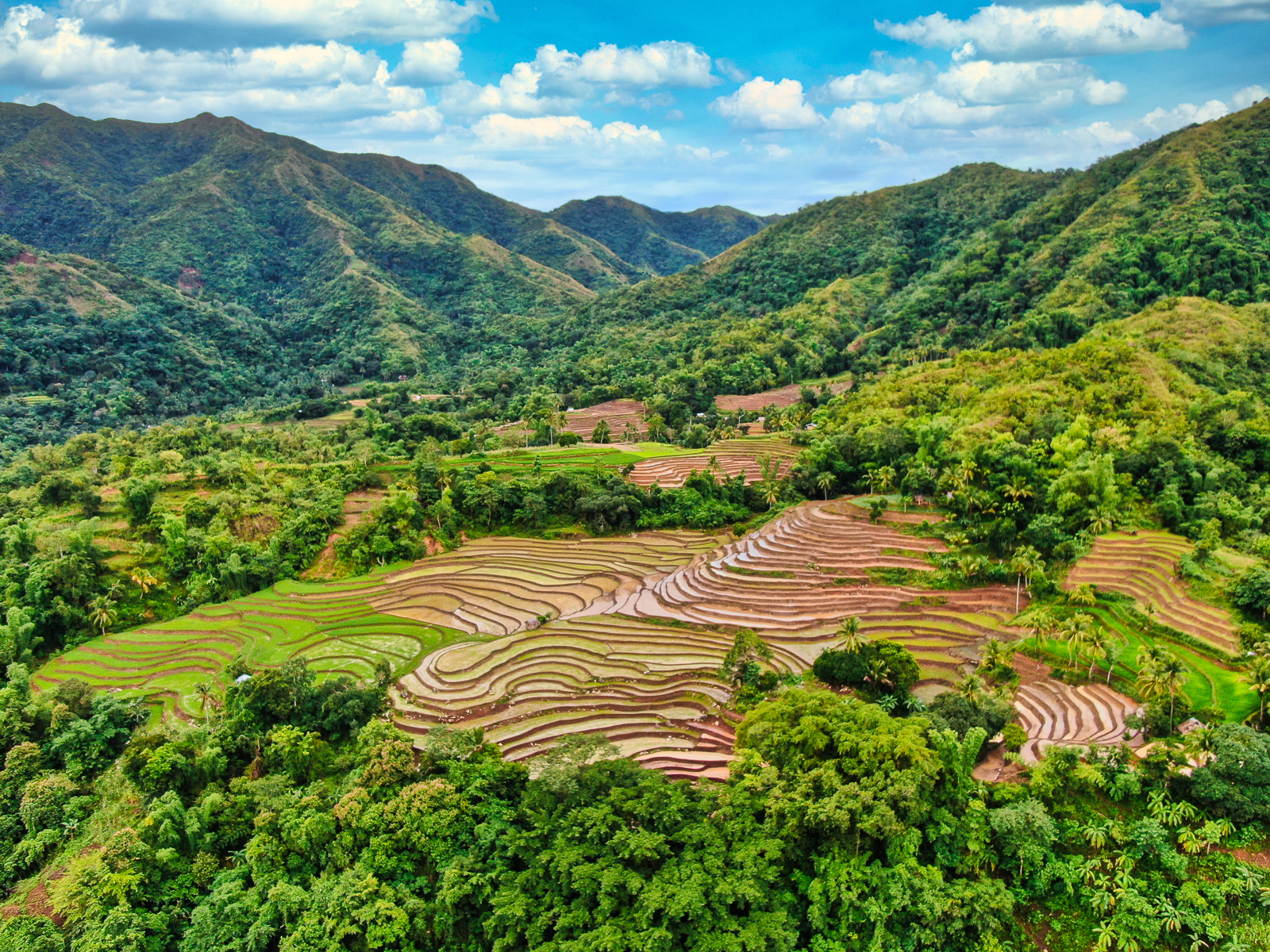
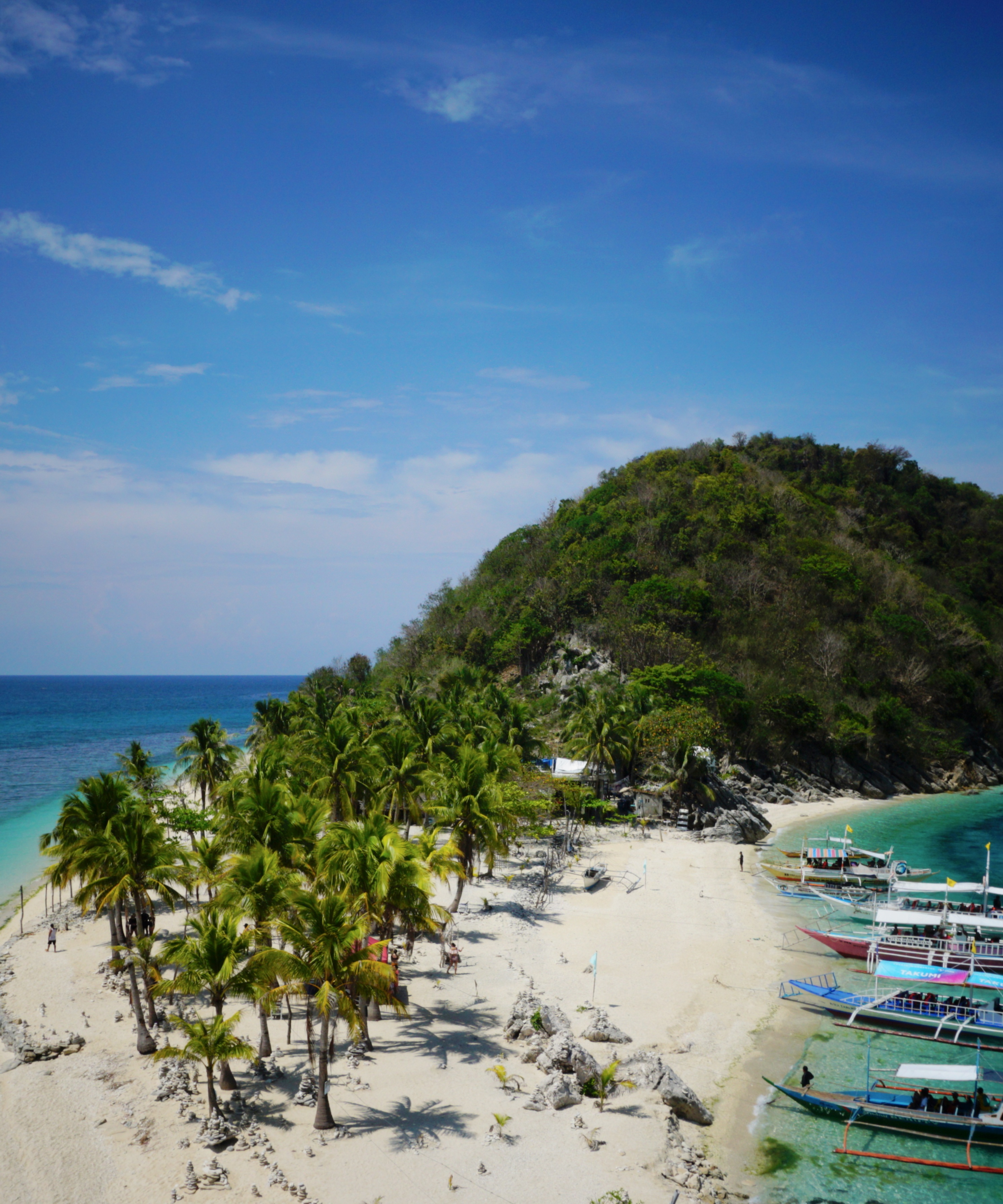
- Clockwise from the top: Miagao Church, Jaro Belfry, Taklong Island, Islas de Gigantes, Tibiao Rice Terraces, Pan-ay Belfry, Boracay
- Anthem: Western Visayas Regional Hymn (DepEd Region VI Hymn)
- Location in the Philippines
- Interactive map of Western Visayas
- Coordinates: 11°08′N 122°32′E
- Country: Philippines
- Island group: Visayas
- Regional center and largest city: Iloilo City

Area
  - Total: 12,750.63 km^{2} (4,923.05 sq mi)
- Highest elevation (Mount Madja-as): 2,117 m (6,946 ft)

Population (2024 census)
  - Total: 4,861,911
  - Density: 381.3075/km^{2} (987.5819/sq mi)
  - Households: 1,939,989

Divisions
  - Provinces: 5: Aklan; Antique; Capiz; Guimaras; Iloilo
  - Independent cities: 1: Iloilo City
  - Component cities: 2: Passi; Roxas City
  - Municipalities: 98
  - Barangays: 3.389
  - Districts: 10

Economy
  - Poverty incidence: 5.2% (2025)
  - GDP total: US$13.9 billion
  - GDP per capita: US$2,878
  - HDI (2023): 0.723 high · 6th of 17
- Time zone: UTC+8 (PST)
- PSGC: 0600000000
- ISO 3166 code: PH-06
- Electorate: 3,128,562 voters (2025)
- Languages: Hiligaynon; Kinaray-a; Aklanon; Capiznon; Inati; Tagalog; Onhan; Ligbok; English

Western Visayas (Hiligaynon: Kabisay-an Nakatundan; Tagalog: Kanlurang Kabisayaan; Filipino: Kanlurang Visayas), designated as Region VI, is an administrative region in the Philippines. The region comprises the islands of Panay and Guimaras. It consists of five provinces: Aklan, Antique, Capiz, and Iloilo on Panay, and the island province of Guimaras. The region also includes one highly urbanized city, Iloilo City, which is the largest city and serves as the regional center.

The Hiligaynon language, native to Iloilo City, is the region's lingua franca. The region is also dominated by native speakers of three Visayan languages: Kinaray-a, Aklanon and Capiznon. The land area of the region is 12,750.63 km^{2} (4,923.05 sq mi), and with a population of 4,730,771 inhabitants.

== Etymology ==
The region's name is in reference to its geographic position in the greater Visayas area.

== History ==
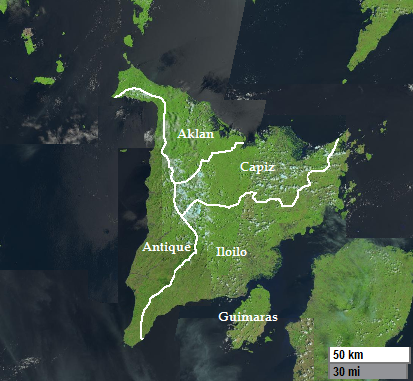
A satellite map of Western Visayas

Regions first came into existence on September 24, 1972, when the provinces of the Philippines were organized into 11 regions by Presidential Decree No. 1 as part of the Integrated Reorganization Plan by President Ferdinand Marcos Sr. The provinces of Aklan, Antique, Capiz, Iloilo (including its then-subprovince of Guimaras), and Negros Occidental were grouped together to form the Western Visayas region.

The province of Palawan was transferred to Region VI (Western Visayas) on May 23, 2005, by Executive Order 429. The Department of the Interior and Local Government announced in June 2005 that the transfer had been completed. However, Palaweños criticized the move, citing a lack of consultation, with most residents in Puerto Princesa City and all municipalities but one preferring to stay with Region IV-B. Consequently, Administrative Order No. 129 was issued on August 19, 2005, to address this backlash. This Order directed the abeyance of Executive Order 429 pending the approval of an implementation plan for the orderly transfer of Palawan from Region IV-B to Region VI. Hence, Palawan is currently still part of Region IV-B.

By virtue of Executive Order No. 183 issued on May 29, 2015, by President Benigno Aquino III, the province of Negros Occidental and its capital, Bacolod, were both removed from Western Visayas in order to form the Negros Island Region along with Negros Oriental. But later regained Negros Occidental and its capital, Bacolod City back into Western Visayas on August 9, 2017, when President Rodrigo Duterte dissolved the Negros Island Region, revoking Executive Order No. 183, s. 2015 through the signage of Executive Order No. 38, citing the reason of the lack of funds to fully establish the NIR according to Benjamin Diokno, the Secretary of Budget and Management.

On June 13, 2024, the region again lost Negros Occidental and Bacolod when the Negros Island Region was reestablished under Republic Act No. 12000 signed by President Bongbong Marcos

== Geography ==
Western Visayas consists of the major island of Panay and the smaller Guimaras, as well as several outlying islands. Its land area is 12,750.63 km^{2} (4,923.05 sq mi), 4.25% of the country's total land area.

The region is bordered to the north by the Sibuyan Sea, northeast by the Visayan Sea, southeast by the island of Negros, south by the Iloilo Strait and Panay Gulf, and west by the Sulu Sea.

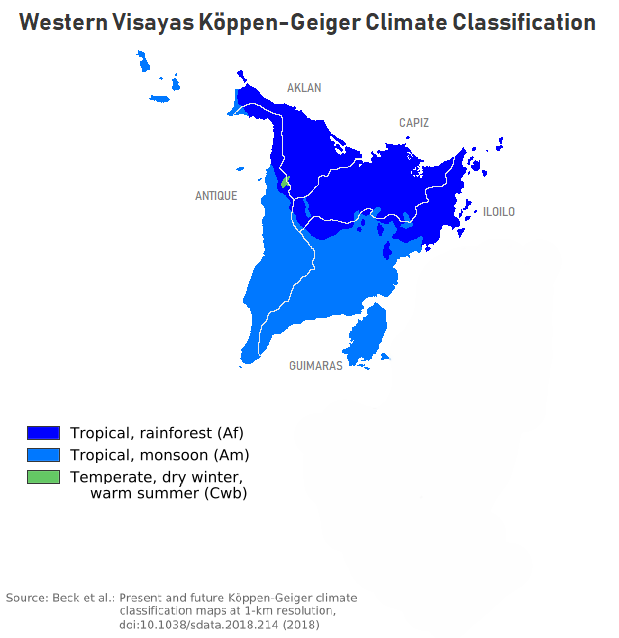
A Köppen climate classification map of the Western Visayas region, Philippines.

=== Administrative divisions ===
==== Provinces ====
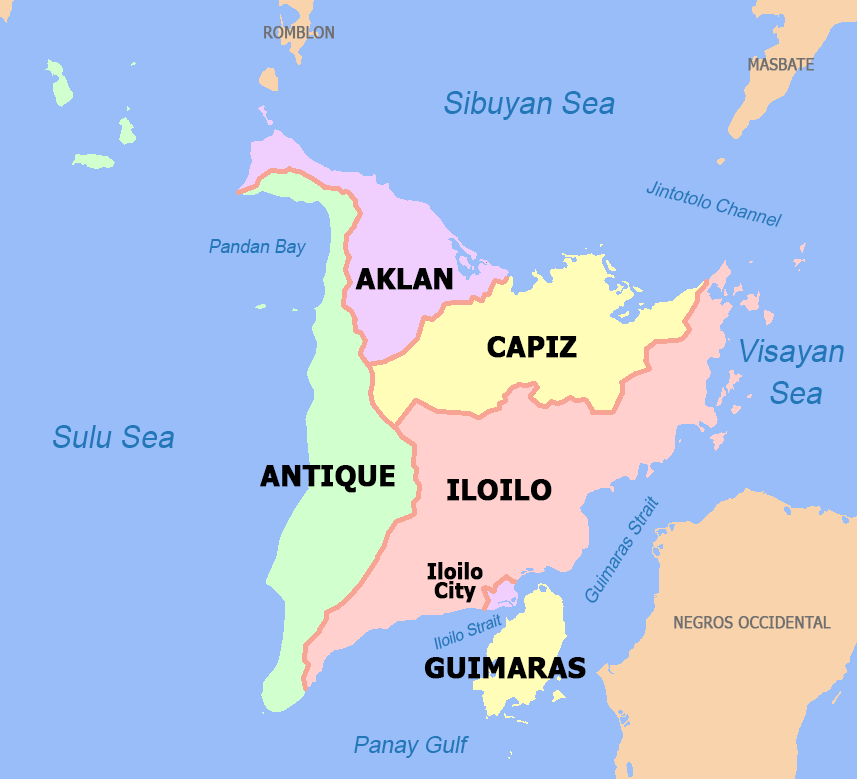
A political map of Western Visayas

Western Visayas consists of 5 provinces, 1 highly urbanized city, 2 component cities, 98 municipalities and 3,389 barangays.

Province or HUC		Capital	Population (2020)		Area		Density		Cities	Muni.	Barangay
					km^{2}	sq mi	/km^{2}	/sq mi			
Aklan		Kalibo	7.7%	615,475	1,760.30	679.66	350	910	0	17	327
Antique		San Jose de Buenavista	7.7%	612,974	2,730.67	1,054.32	220	570	0	18	590
Capiz		Roxas City	10.1%	804,952	2,594.64	1,001.80	310	800	1	16	473
Guimaras		Jordan	2.4%	187,842	611.87	236.24	310	800	0	5	98
Iloilo		Iloilo City	25.8%	2,051,899	4,997.64	1,929.60	410	1,100	1	42	1,721
Iloilo City	†	—	5.8%	457,626	78.34	30.25	5,800	15,000	—	—	180
Total				4,730,771	12,750.63	4,923.05	370	960	2	98	3,389
† Iloilo City is a highly urbanized city; figures are excluded from Iloilo province.

===== Governors and vice governors =====
Province	Image	Governor	Political Party	Vice Governor
Aklan		Jose Enrique Miraflores	Lakas	Dexter M. Calizo
Antique		Paolo Everardo S. Javier	Aksyon	Genevive L. Reyes
Capiz		Fredenil Castro	1-Capiz	James Magbanua
Guimaras		Ma. Lucille L. Nava	NUP	Cecile C. Gamarin
Iloilo		Arthur Defensor Jr.	Uswag Ilonggo	Nathalie Ann F. Debuque

==== Cities ====
- † Regional center

City	Population (2020)	Area		Density		City class	Income class	Province
		km^{2}	sq mi	/km^{2}	/sq mi			
† Iloilo City	457,626	78.34	30.25	5,800	15,000	Highly urbanized	1st	Iloilo
Passi	88,873	251.39	97.06	350	910	Component	4th	Iloilo
Roxas City	179,292	95.07	36.71	1,900	4,900	Component	2nd	Capiz

== Demographics ==
Population census of Western Visayas
Year	Pop.	±% p.a.
1903	1,083,474	—
1918	1,347,249	+1.46%
1939	2,173,579	+2.30%
1948	2,530,517	+1.70%
1960	3,078,305	+1.65%
1970	3,618,326	+1.63%
1975	4,146,390	+2.77%
1980	4,525,615	+1.77%
1990	5,393,333	+1.77%
1995	5,776,938	+1.30%
2000	6,211,038	+1.57%
2007	6,843,643	+1.35%
2010	7,102,438	+1.36%
2015	7,536,383	+1.14%
2020	7,954,723	+1.14%
2024	4,861,911	−11.15%
Data in 2015 and 2020 includes Negros Occidental and Bacolod. Source: Philippine Statistics Authority.

In the 2024 census, it has a population of 4,861,911. Before Negros Occidental and Bacolod separated from the region in 2024, it was 7,954,723.

=== Languages ===
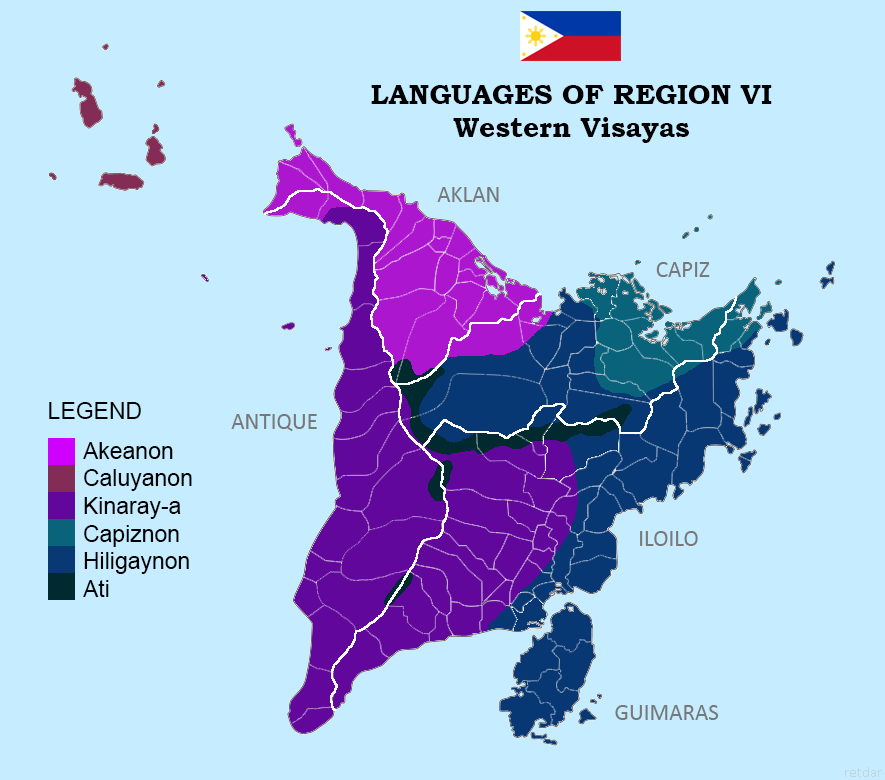
A language map of the Western Visayas

The native languages of Western Visayas are:

- Aklanon/Akeanon, spoken in Aklan, northwestern Capiz, and northern Antique.
- Capiznon, spoken in Capiz, northeastern Iloilo, and eastern Aklan.
- Hiligaynon, spoken in Iloilo, Guimaras, Capiz, Antique, and Aklan. It is the regional lingua franca.
- Kinaray-a, spoken in Antique, western half of Iloilo, Guimaras, western Capiz, and southwestern Aklan.
- Inati, spoken by the indigenous Ati people in Antique, Iloilo, Guimaras, Aklan, and Capiz.
- Malaynon, spoken in northwestern Aklan including Boracay Island.
- Caluyanon, spoken in the Semirara Islands (Semirara, Caluya, and Sibay Islands).
- Ligbok, spoken by the Sulod people in the highlands of Tapaz, Capiz and Calinog, Iloilo.

== Economy ==
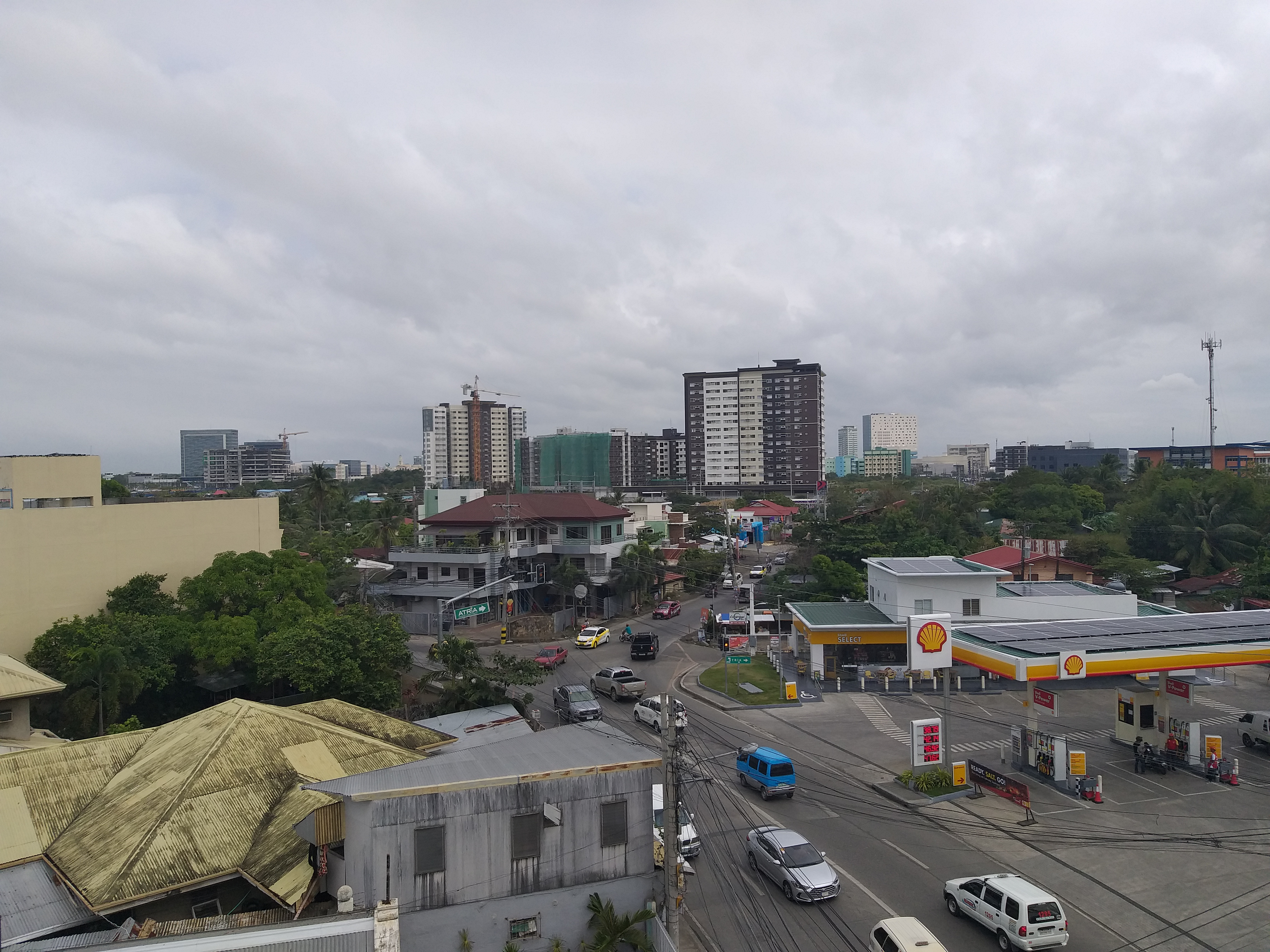
A view of Iloilo City, January 2019

Poverty incidence of Western Visayas (%)

Source: Philippine Statistics Authority

Injap Tower & SM Strata, June 2018

Western Visayas is the sixth largest economy in the Philippines, comprising three major sectors: agriculture, forestry, and fishery; services; and industry. Iloilo City serves as the region's economic hub. Other major trading and commercial centers in the region include Roxas City for Capiz and the entire northern Panay. Provincial capitals such as Kalibo in Aklan, San Jose in Antique, and Jordan in Guimaras serve as the commercial centers for their respective provinces. Metro Iloilo, composed of Iloilo City and the municipalities of Oton, San Miguel, Pavia, Leganes, Santa Barbara, and Cabatuan, is the center for trading, commercial, financial, and industrial activities in the region.

=== Tourism ===
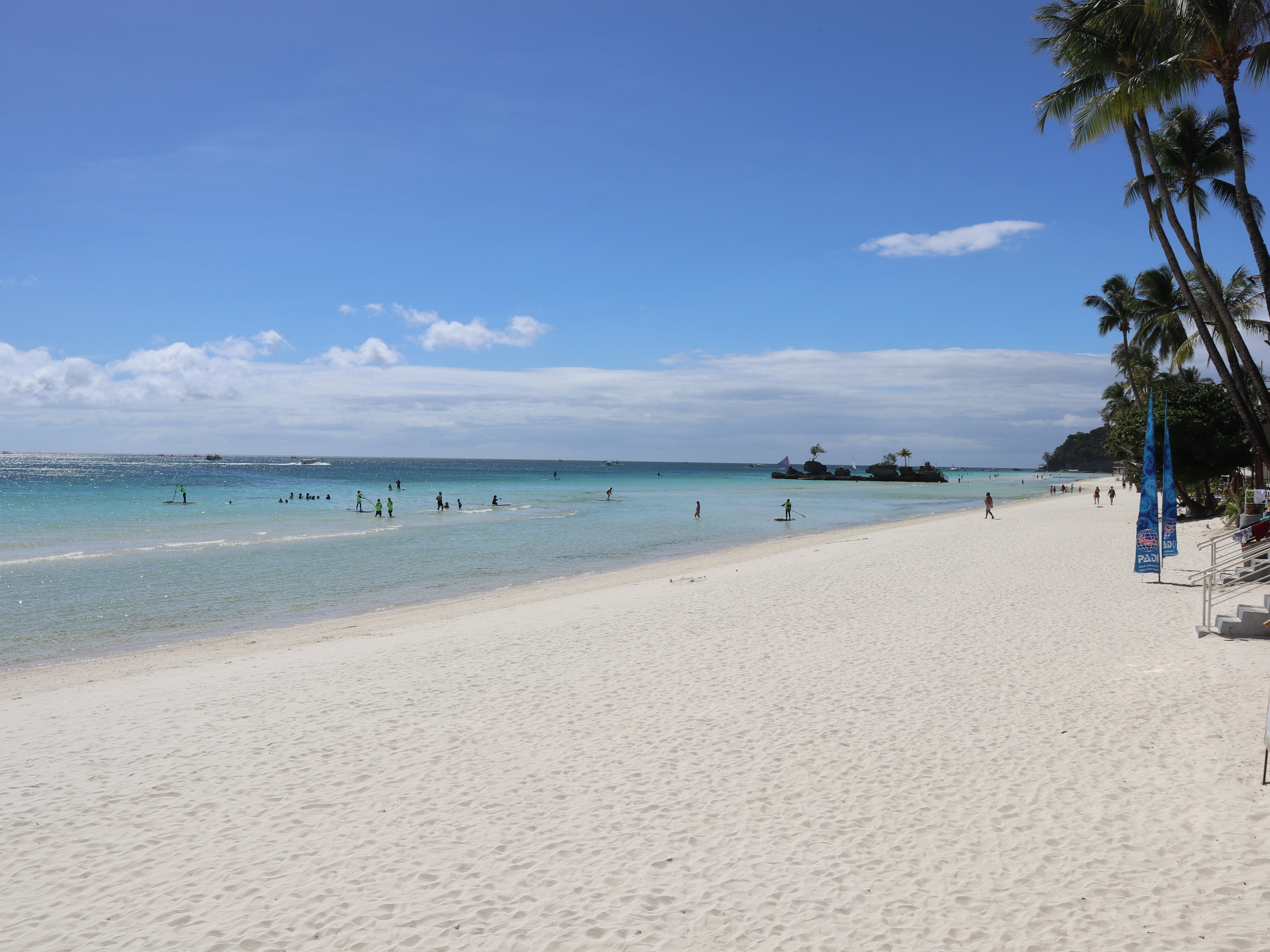
White Beach in Boracay, one of the most popular beaches in the world

The region is known for its rich cultural heritage and natural beauty, featuring several key tourism highlights. Boracay Island, located in Malay, Aklan, is world-famous for its pristine white sand beaches, crystal-clear waters, and vibrant nightlife. Miag-ao Church in Miag-ao, Iloilo, a UNESCO World Heritage Site, showcases unique Baroque-Romanesque architecture and detailed designs.

Iloilo City, a UNESCO Creative City of Gastronomy, is also known for its colonial-era heritage houses, churches, and buildings. The Gigantes Islands in Carles, Iloilo, are known for their white sand beaches, sandbars, limestone cliffs, and clear blue waters. Panay Church in Panay, Capiz hosts the biggest church bell in Asia. Mount Madja-as in Antique is the highest mountain in the region. Guimaras mangoes from Guimaras are known as some of the sweetest in the world. The region is also home to popular festivals such as the Dinagyang of Iloilo City and the Ati-Atihan of Kalibo, Aklan.

== Transportation ==
=== Roads ===
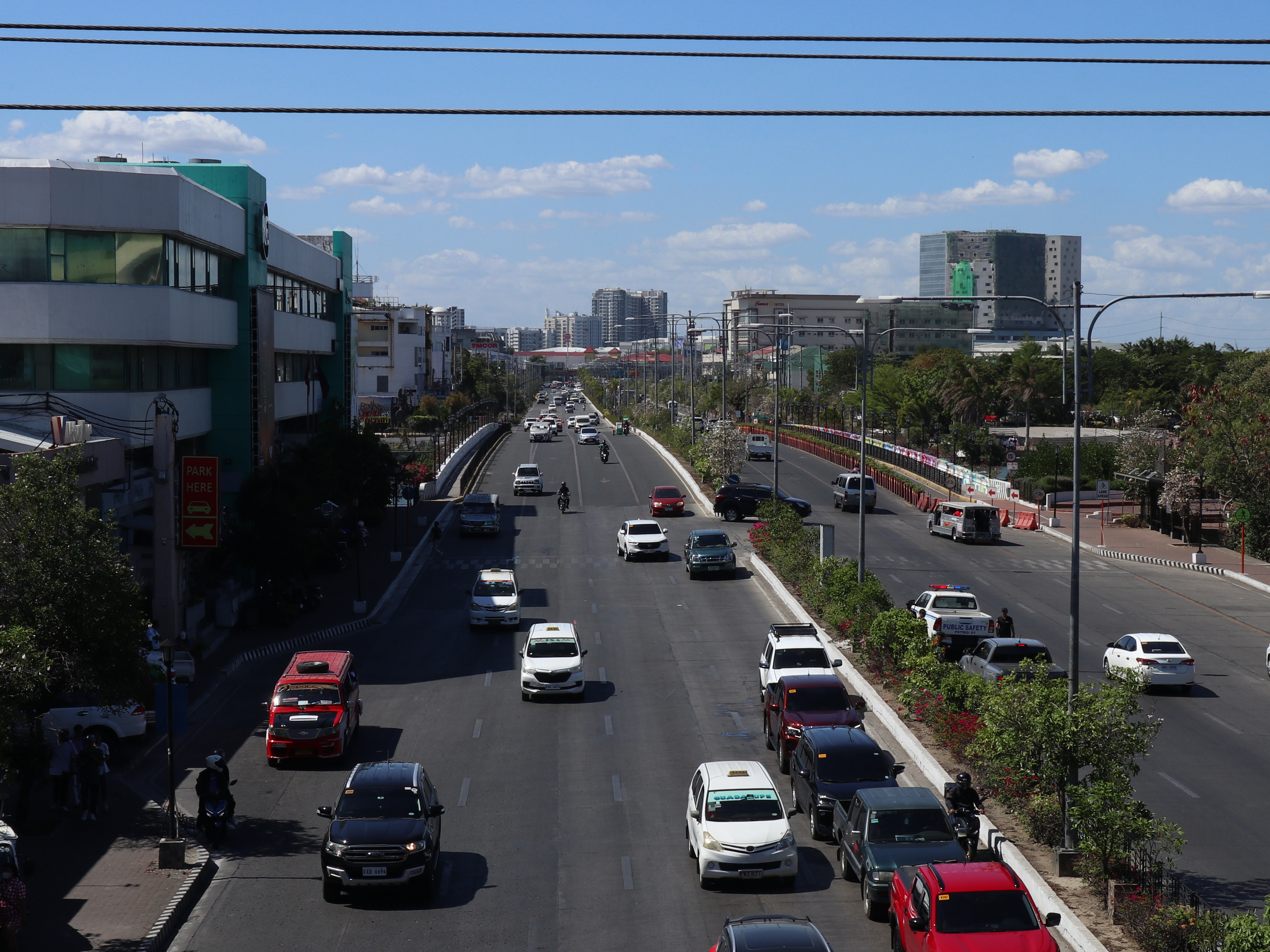
Iloilo–Capiz Road in Iloilo City

Western Visayas is interconnected by major inter-provincial roads that facilitate travel across its provinces. Iloilo City, the region's primary urban center, relies heavily on various public transportation options, including passenger jeepneys, modern Public Utility Jeepneys (modern PUJs), white metered taxis, and tricycles within city limits. In other cities and municipalities, such as Roxas City, Kalibo, and San Jose de Buenavista, tricycles are the primary mode of transport for short distances. Travel between cities and municipalities across Panay Island is typically facilitated by jeepneys, vans, and buses operated by companies like Ceres.

In March 2019, the Land Transportation Franchising and Regulatory Board (LTFRB) launched a Premium Point-to-Point Bus Service in Iloilo City, providing express bus services to airports in Cabatuan, Kalibo, and Caticlan (Boracay).

=== Ports ===
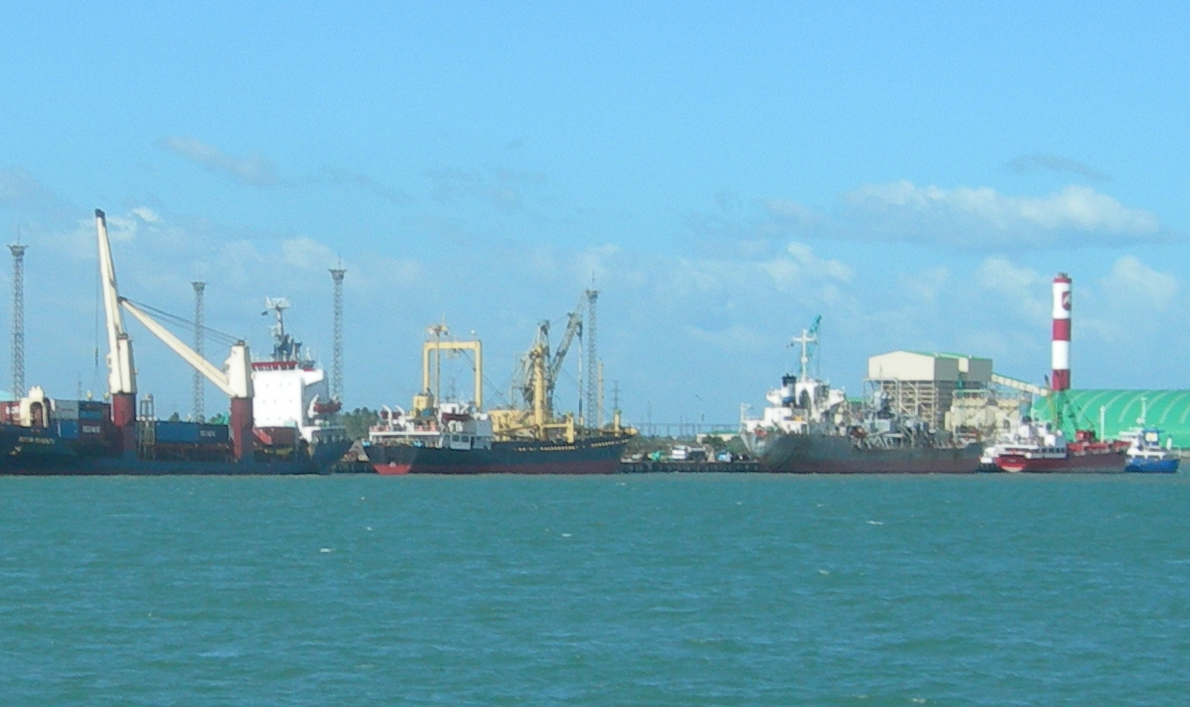
International Container Terminal in Port of Iloilo

The Port of Iloilo is the primary seaport serving the region. Other seaports include Dumangas Port in Dumangas, Iloilo, serves ro-ro and fastcraft to Negros Island and vice versa; Jordan Port in Guimaras, serves ferries from Iloilo City and vice versa; Culasi Port in Roxas, Capiz, serves ferry routes to Batangas and Caticlan and vice versa; Caticlan Port in Malay, Aklan, serves ferries to Boracay Island and vice versa; and the Port of San Jose de Buenavista in Antique, which serves ferries to Palawan and Iloilo City and vice versa.

=== Airports ===
Iloilo International Airport

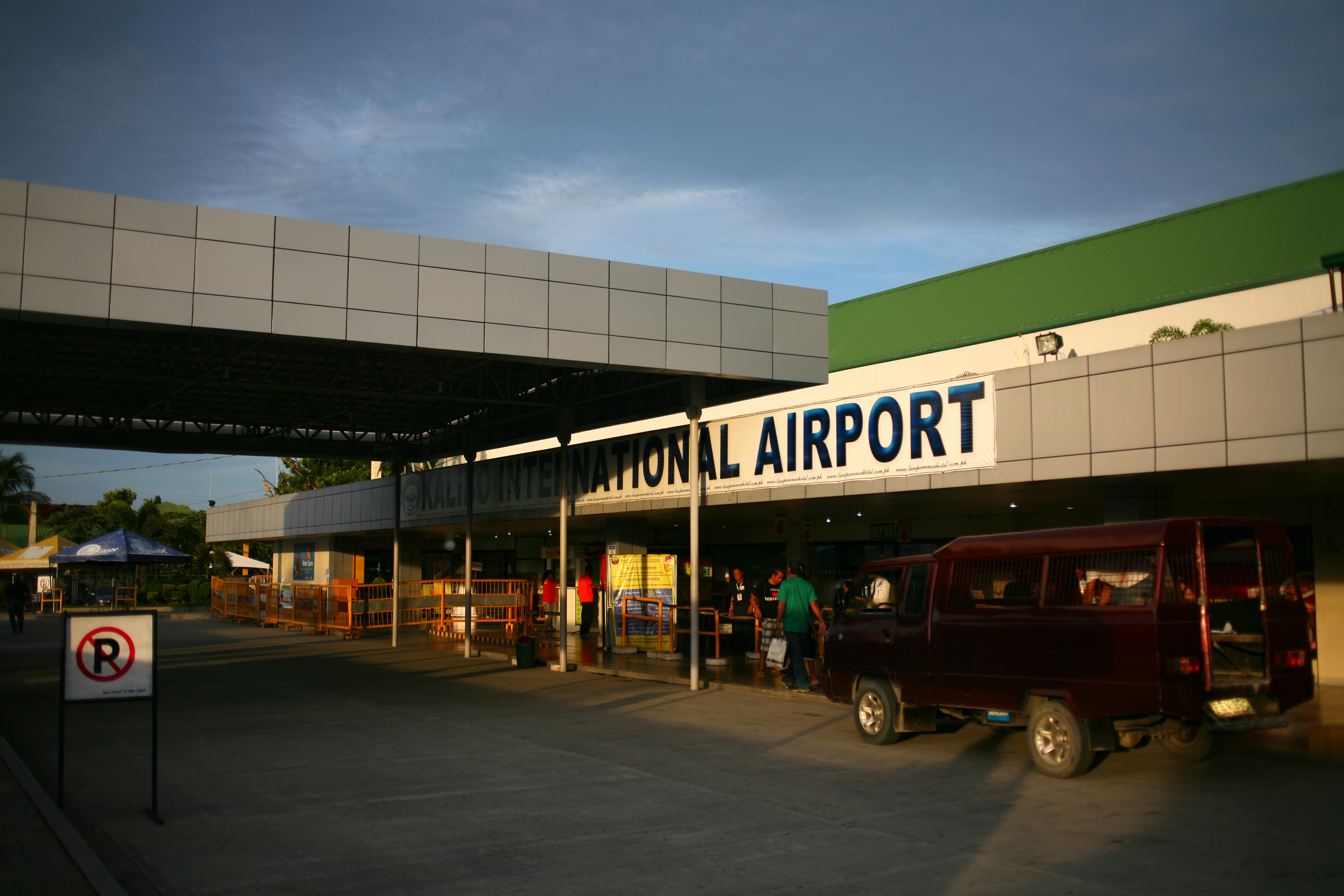
Kalibo International Airport

Western Visayas is served by two international airports and three domestic airports. Iloilo International Airport, located in Cabatuan, Iloilo, serves the general area of Metro Iloilo–Guimaras as well as the entire province of Iloilo, and a gateway into the region. Kalibo International Airport serves the general area of Aklan and is one of the two airports serving Boracay, the other being the domestic Godofredo P. Ramos Airport in Caticlan, Malay, Aklan. The other domestic airports are Roxas Airport, serving the general area of Roxas City and the province of Capiz, and Evelio B. Javier Airport, serving the general area of the province of Antique.

The other airports and airstrips in the region include Semirara Airport on Semirara Island in Caluya, Antique; Sicogon Airport on Sicogon Island in Carles, Iloilo; and Guimaras Airstrip.

=== Rail ===
Proposals to re-connect Iloilo-Roxas, Iloilo-Kalibo, Iloilo-Malay (Aklan) and Iloilo-San Jose (Antique) from Iloilo City via rail were included in the revival of the currently defunct Panay Railways network which has a station in Santa Barbara town proper.
