= Port of Iloilo =

Port of Iloilo Pantalan sang Iloilo
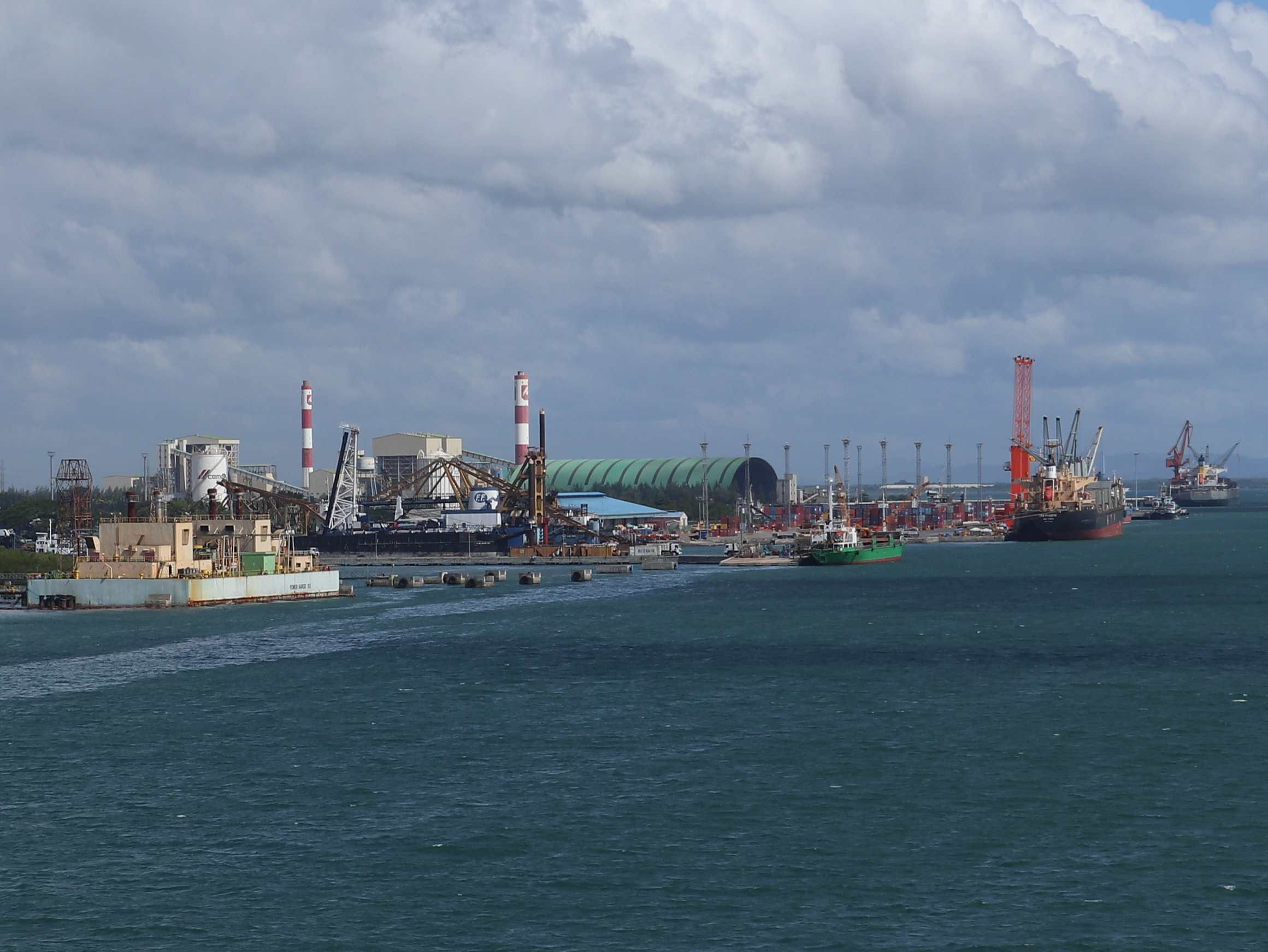
- Visayas Container Terminal in Lapuz district
- Interactive map of Port of Iloilo; Pantalan sang Iloilo

Location
- Country: Philippines
- Location: Iloilo City Proper and Lapuz, Iloilo City
- Coordinates: 10°41′24″N 122°34′59″E
- UN/LOCODE: PHILO

Details
- Opened: September 29, 1855
- Operated by: Philippine Ports Authority
- Owned by: Iloilo City Government
- Type of Harbor: Natural/Artificial
- Size: 20.8 hectares (51 acres)
- No. of wharfs: 3
- No. of piers: 2
- Hub For: Negros Navigation (folded to 2GO Travel)

Statistics
- Vessel arrivals: 78,679^{(2023)}
- Annual cargo tonnage: 4,038,984^{(2023)}
- Annual container volume: 150,889 TEU^{(2023)}
- Passenger traffic: 7,566,772^{(2023)}
- Website www.ppa.com.ph

The Port of Iloilo (Hiligaynon: Pantalan sang Iloilo) is a seaport located in Iloilo City, Philippines. It serves the city, province of Iloilo, and the entire island of Panay in the Western Visayas region of the Philippines. It is located in the districts of Iloilo City Proper and Lapuz, on the southeastern coast of Panay, in Iloilo Strait, and one of the country’s safest and most natural harbors. The Port of Iloilo is managed by the Philippine Ports Authority, a government-owned corporation, and consists of major facilities: the Iloilo River Wharf, Iloilo Domestic Port, and the Visayas Container Terminal.

It is one of the busiest ports in the country, recording 78,679 ship calls, 4 million metric tons in cargo throughput, and 7.6 million passengers in 2023.

== History ==
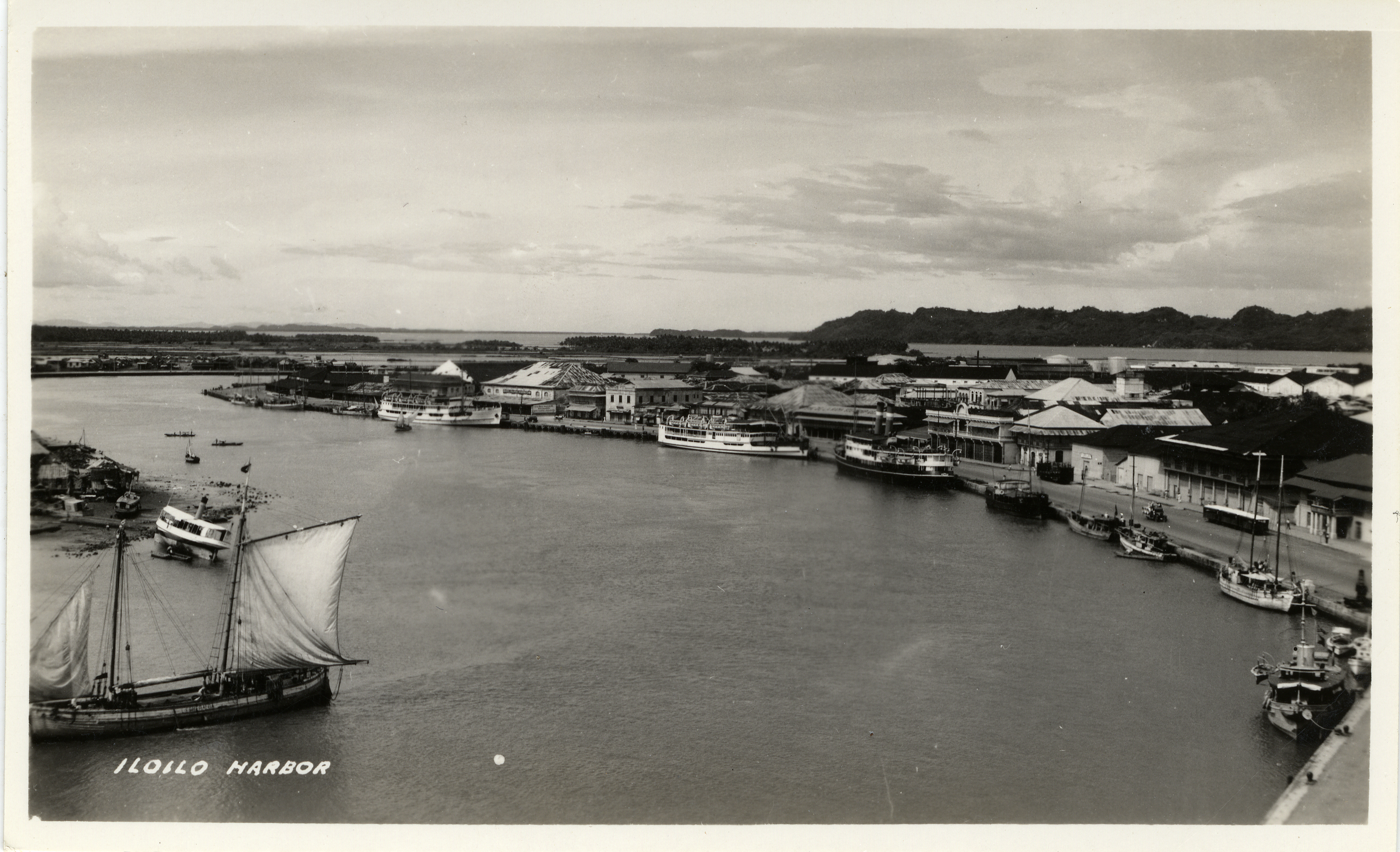
Aerial view of the Muelle Loney Wharf on the Iloilo River, circa 1920s

The Port of Iloilo has been a hub for international shipping since 1855, facilitating the export of sugar and fertilizer to global markets. Its opening to the world market on September 29, 1855, by Queen Isabella II of Spain, revitalized the local economy following the decline of the textile industry. With the inauguration of the Suez Canal in 1869, trade with Europe, particularly the United Kingdom, became more accessible. Nicholas Loney, the U.K. consul, played a pivotal role in this development, and Muelle Loney, the quay along the Iloilo River, is named in his honor.

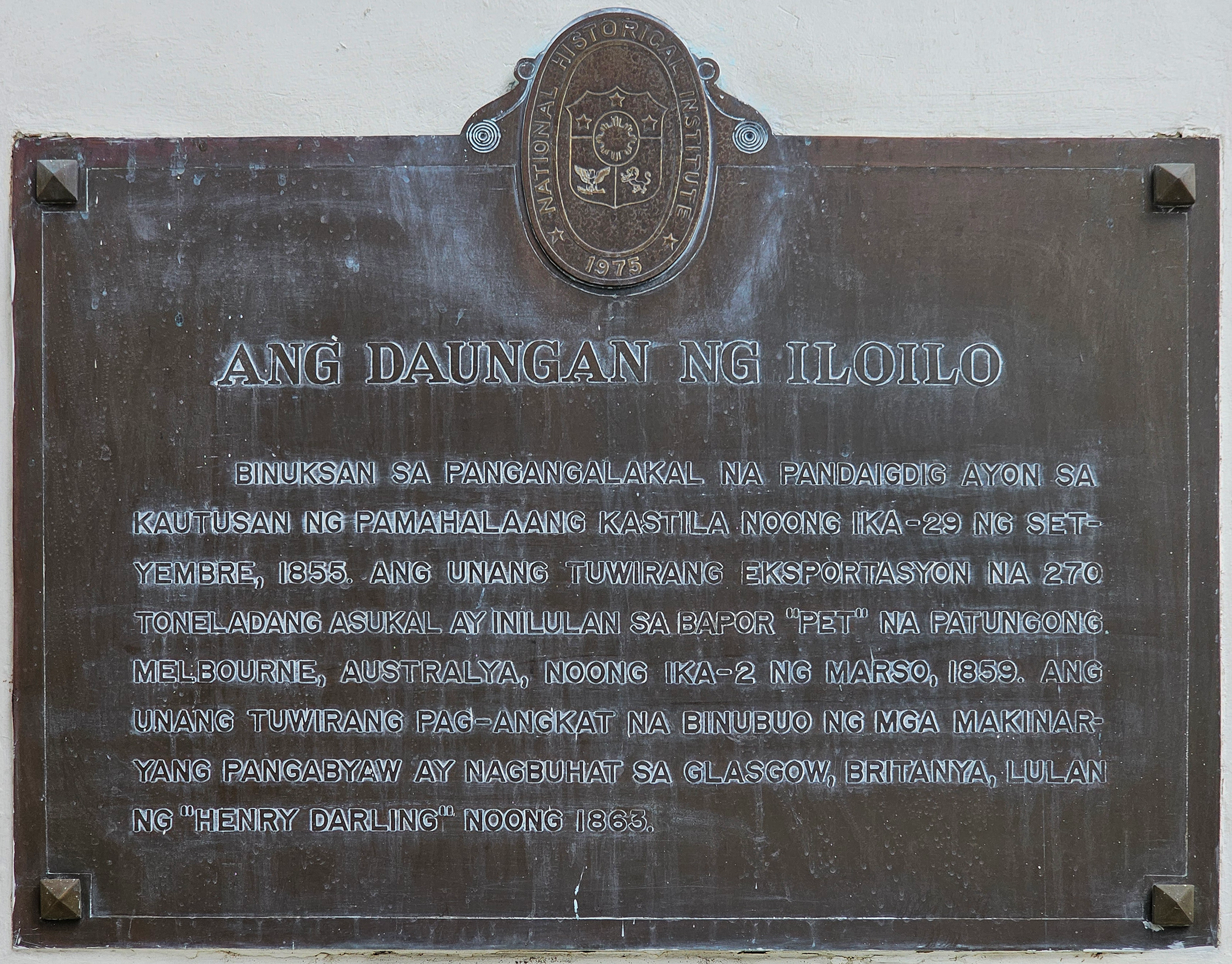
Port of Iloilo Historical Marker (1975)

The rise of the sugar industry spurred an economic boom in Iloilo and its neighboring island, Negros. Iloilo emerged as a leading center of commerce and trade in the Visayas and Mindanao, second only to Manila. Serving as the primary deep-water port for both Iloilo and Bacolod, the capital of Negros Occidental, located 35 miles away across the Guimaras Strait, it handled nearly all sugar and rice trade from Negros during the late 19th and early 20th centuries.

In 2024, International Container Terminal Services, Inc. (ICTSI) secured a 25-year concession deal to develop and manage the Iloilo Commercial Port Complex. As part of this agreement, ICTSI renamed the facility Visayas Container Terminal (VCT).

== Location ==
The Iloilo Harbor is situated within the Iloilo Strait, delineated to the north by a line extending from the Dumangas River across the Iloilo Strait to Navalas Point on Guimaras Island, and to the south by a line stretching from Lusaran Point on Guimaras Island to Surraga River in the municipality of San Joaquin on Panay Island.

== Profile ==
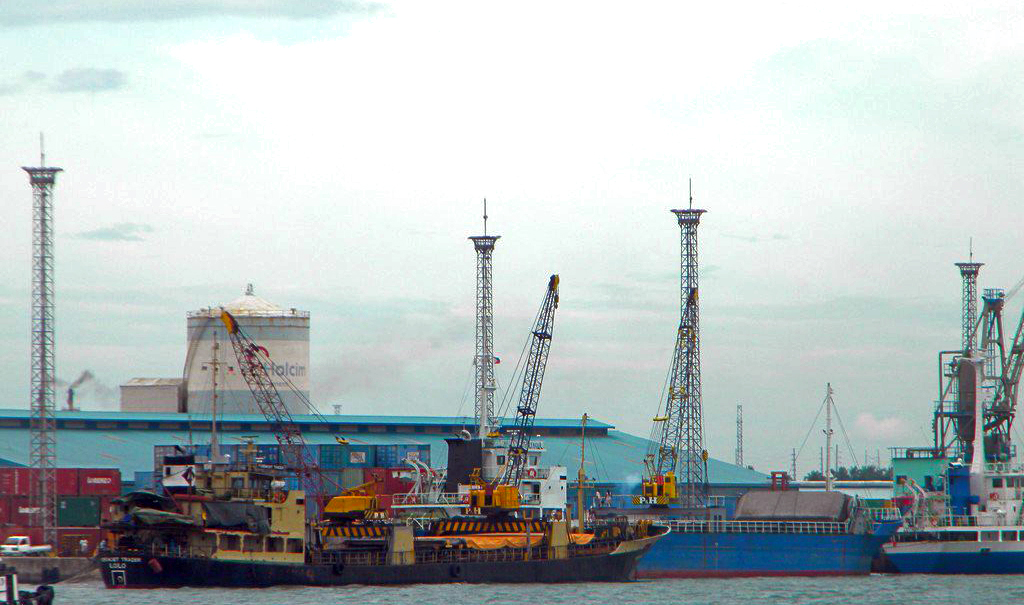
Visayas Container Terminal (VCT), formerly known as Iloilo Commercial Port Complex (ICPC)

The Port of Iloilo, considered the primary trading hub and commercial center for Western Visayas, stands out as one of the safest natural seaports in the Philippines. Spanning 20.8 hectares (51 acres) of reclaimed land, the Iloilo Commercial Port Complex, now known as Visayas Container Terminal, boasts extensive facilities, including 11,400 square metres (123,000 sq ft) of operational space, complemented by an additional area of 97,000 square metres (1,040,000 sq ft), equipped with a crane, 348 metres (1,142 ft) of rails, roll-on-roll-off support, a 7,800-container freight station, and a 720-square-metre (7,800 sq ft) passenger shed. With berth dimensions of 400 metres (1,300 ft) in length, 26.26 metres (86.2 ft) in width, and a berthing depth of 10.50 metres (34.4 ft), the port complex caters to vessels navigating international routes.

Several shipping firms utilize the Port of Iloilo, such as Lorenzo Shipping Corporation, 2GO Travel, Cokaliong Shipping Lines, Philippine Span Asia Carrier Corporation, and Trans-Asia Shipping Lines Inc. Fast ferries operate on the Iloilo-Bacolod route eight times daily, while 2GO inter-island overnight ferries connect to Manila, Bacolod, General Santos, Davao City, Zamboanga and Cagayan de Oro. Fiberglass-made ferries ply the Iloilo Strait to Guimaras throughout the day and offer special trips at night.

Roll-on/roll-off ferry service, or RO-RO, is available between Iloilo City and Guimaras, while the RO-RO to Negros departs from Dumangas, Iloilo, 20 kilometres (12 mi) northeast of Iloilo City.

In 2017 statistics record, the port ranks third in terms of ship calls, with 11,853 recorded, fourth in cargo throughput, totaling 491,719 million metric tons, and fourth in passenger traffic, serving 2.4 million passengers.

== Shipping firms and destinations ==
Shipping Lines	Destinations
2GO Travel	Bacolod, Batangas, Cagayan de Oro, Davao, General Santos, Manila, Zamboanga
Atlantis Yohan Express	Buenavista, Guimaras
Buenavista and Jordan Ferry	Buenavista, Guimaras, Jordan, Guimaras
Cokaliong Shipping Lines	Cebu
FastCat	Bacolod
Jordan Motor Banca Cooperative	Jordan, Guimaras
Maria Estrella Del Mar	Cuyo, Palawan, Puerto Princesa, San Jose, Antique
Milagrosa-J Shipping Lines	Cuyo, Palawan, Puerto Princesa
Montenegro Shipping Lines	Bacolod, Cuyo, Palawan, Jordan, Guimaras, Puerto Princesa
Navimar Shipping Services	Buenavista, Guimaras, Jordan, Guimaras
Ocean Jet	Bacolod
Trans-Asia Shipping Lines	Cebu
Weesam Express	Bacolod

== Facilities ==
The port provides bunkering facilities, offered by Pilipinas Shell, Caltex Philippines Inc., Petrophil Corp, and Petroleum Corp. As a key port in Western Visayas, the Commercial Port Complex (now renamed as Visayas Container Terminal) sits on reclaimed land in Lapuz district and is equipped with modern infrastructure.

Domestic Passenger Terminal

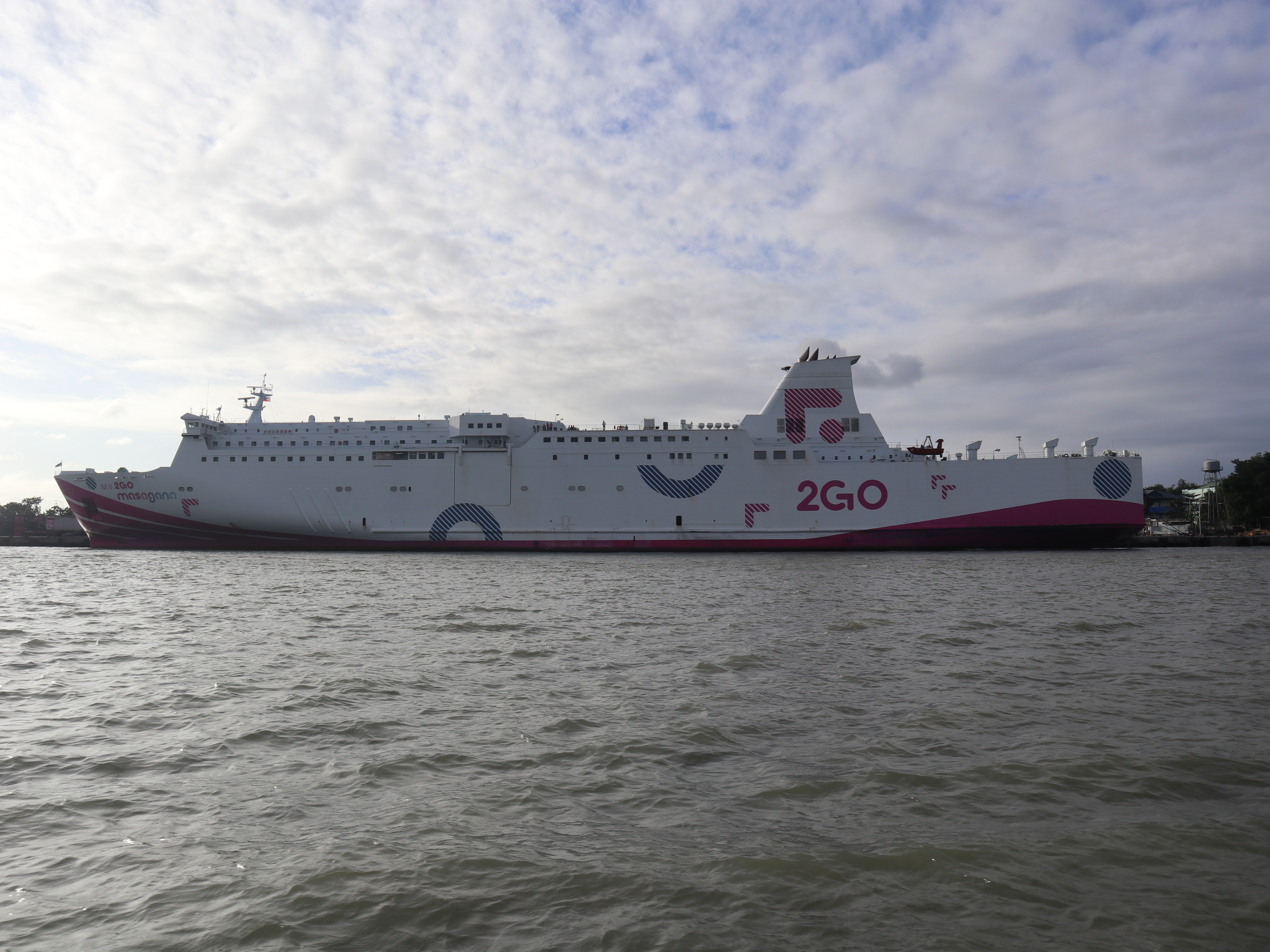
MV 2GO Masagana, Iloilo Domestic Port

The port is mainly divided into the following:

- Iloilo International Port (Visayas Container Terminal, formerly known as Iloilo Commercial Port Complex) - Loboc, Lapuz
- Iloilo Domestic Port (formerly the Old Foreign Pier) - Parola, Iloilo City Proper
- Iloilo River Wharf/Lapuz Wharf (RoRo and Fastcraft Terminal) - Lapuz Norte, Lapuz
- Guimaras-Iloilo Ferry Terminal (Jetty/Motor Banca Terminal) - Parola, Iloilo City Proper
- Ortiz Wharf (Old Jetty/Motor Banca Terminal) - Ortiz, Iloilo City Proper (closed in mid-2020 due to COVID-19 pandemic)

Statistics
Year	Ship Calls	Container Volume (TEU)	Cargo Tonnage (mT)	Passengers
2015	11,224	137,463	3,347,648	1,823,371
2016	12,307	151,817	3,574,575	2,237,811
2017	12,592	162,290	3,758,453	2,402,748
2018	13,315	165,759	3,984,649	2,547,596
2019	19,162	171,025	4,130,055	3,124,361
2020	14,990	154,234	3,768,905	1,105,572
2021	49,458	157,953	4,208,456	3,109,498
2022	63,093	167,962	4,446,275	5,962,999
2023	78,679	150,889	4,038,984	7,566,772

== Data ==
Facility data for the Port of Iloilo
Type	m^{2}
Old foreign pier	17,000
River wharf	68,000
Iloilo Commercial Port Complex	208,000
Back-up area/commercial	97,000
Operational area	111,000

The Port of Iloilo also offers open storage facilities, data listed below:

Outdoor storage data for the Port of Iloilo
Type	m^{2}
Old foreign pier open storage	9,200
River wharf open storage	8,682

== See also ==
- List of East Asian ports
- Fort San Pedro (Iloilo)
- Iloilo Strait
- Iloilo Fish Port Complex
