= Iloilo Fish Port Complex =

Fishing port in Iloilo City, Philippines

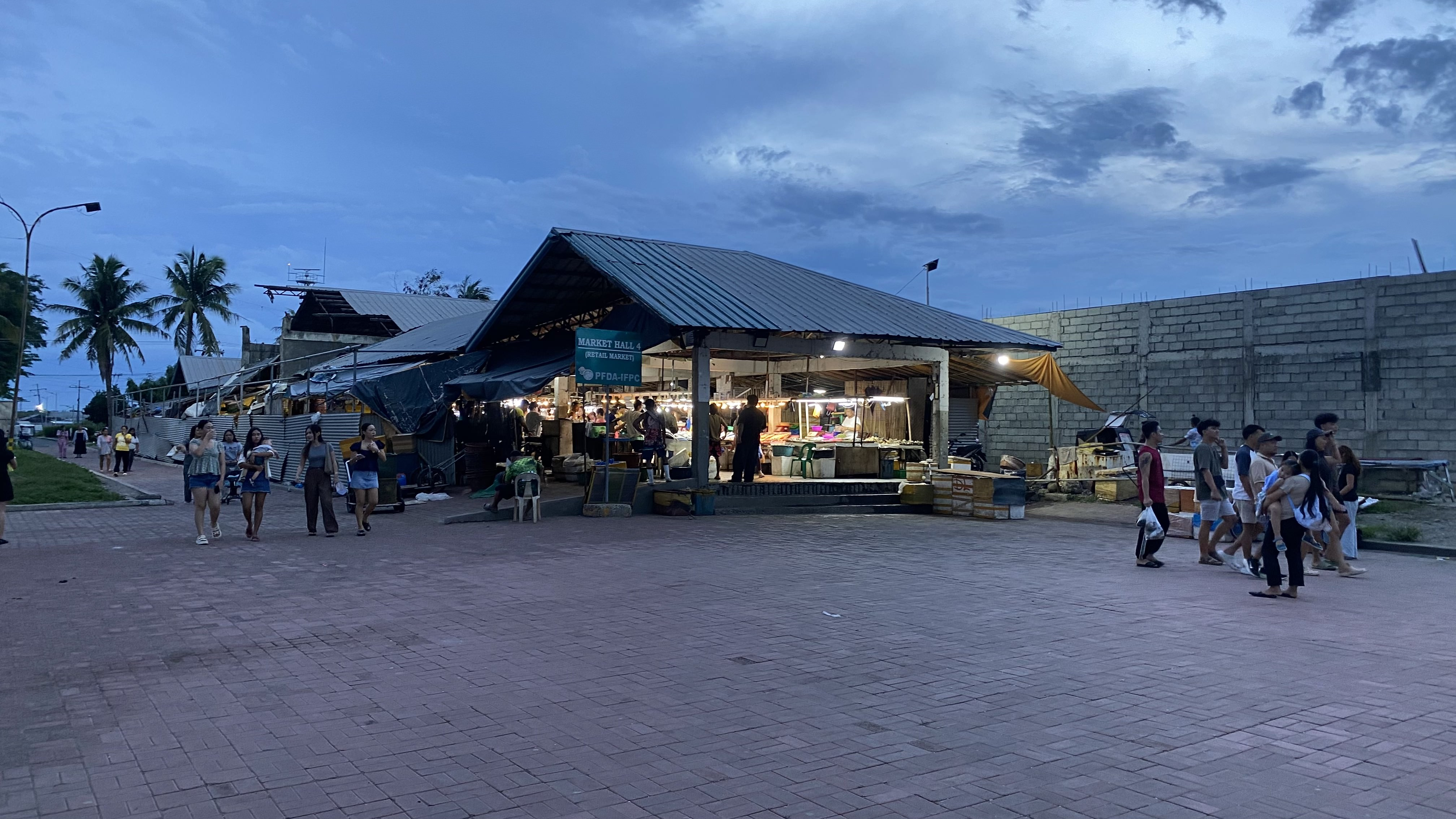
- Iloilo Fish Port Market Hall
- Interactive map of Iloilo Fish Port Complex
- Location within Philippines

Location
- Location: Iloilo City Proper, Iloilo City, Philippines
- Coordinates: 10°41′24″N 122°33′27″E

Details
- Opened: 1976
- Operated by: Philippine Fisheries Development Authority
- Owned by: Iloilo City Government
- Type of Harbor: fishing port
- Size: 21 hectares (52 acres)

Statistics
- Website pfda.gov.ph

The Iloilo Fish Port Complex (IFPC) is a fishing port and fish market in Iloilo City, Philippines. It serves as a major center for fish trading and marine product processing in the Visayas region. The complex is situated on a 21-hectare reclaimed area in Barangay Tanza, Iloilo City Proper.

IFPC has been the primary landing site for bagnetters and various fishing bancas from Iloilo City and its surrounding towns. The location has positioned the port complex as the principal source of fish for Iloilo City’s major public markets and adjacent municipalities.

In March 2022, the fish port complex was granted ₱570 million for the expansion of its facilities which will include the construction of a new fish processing plant, establishment of a fish canning facility and the construction of an alternative energy source. The rehabilitation was completed in 2025.

== Services and facilities ==
Fishing vessels

The Iloilo Fish Port Complex offers comprehensive unloading and marketing facilities for fish and other fishery and aquatic products, catering to both local and international markets. It provides essential services and infrastructure for harbor operations, including drydocking and repair shops, as well as facilities for fuel, oil, water, and ice conveyance, which support the transshipment of goods. Additionally, the complex features a range of post-harvest services such as processing and refrigeration, including product pre-processing, freezing via contact freezers, and cold storage. These facilities are equipped to handle high-quality marine products, including prawns, abalone, cuttlefish, lobster, nylon shell, octopus, slippertail, squid, whiting, and bangus. Furthermore, there is available raw land designated for the establishment of fishery-related factories.

- Breakwater
- Landing Quay
  - Tuna Boat
  - Trawlers and purse seiners
  - Basnigans
  - Bancas
- Refrigeration facility

== See also ==
- Port of Iloilo
