= Port of Puerto Princesa =

Port of Puerto Princesa Pantalan ng Puerto Princesa
- Interactive map of Port of Puerto Princesa; Pantalan ng Puerto Princesa

Location
- Country: Philippines
- Location: Puerto Princesa, Palawan
- Coordinates: 9°44′34″N 118°43′40″E
- UN/LOCODE: PHPPS

Details
- Operated by: Philippine Ports Authority

Statistics
- Website http://www.ppa.com.ph

The Port of Puerto Princesa is the Palawan baseport of the Philippine Ports Authority. It is located about Latitude 09° 44"N, Longitude 118° 43"E, on the western side of Puerto Princesa, westward of Princesa Strait, and the western side of Palawan Island. The port lies 558 meters from a coral reef on the southern portion of Bancao-Bancao Point. Its sea distance from Manila is 370.6 nautical miles (686.4 km). The Port of Puerto Princesa is a major port of entry at the island-province of Palawan.

Puerto Princesa City is located in the middle of the big stretch of the island, and as such, serves as the hub of transport (of goods and passengers) activities for both the northern and southern municipalities of the province.

== History ==
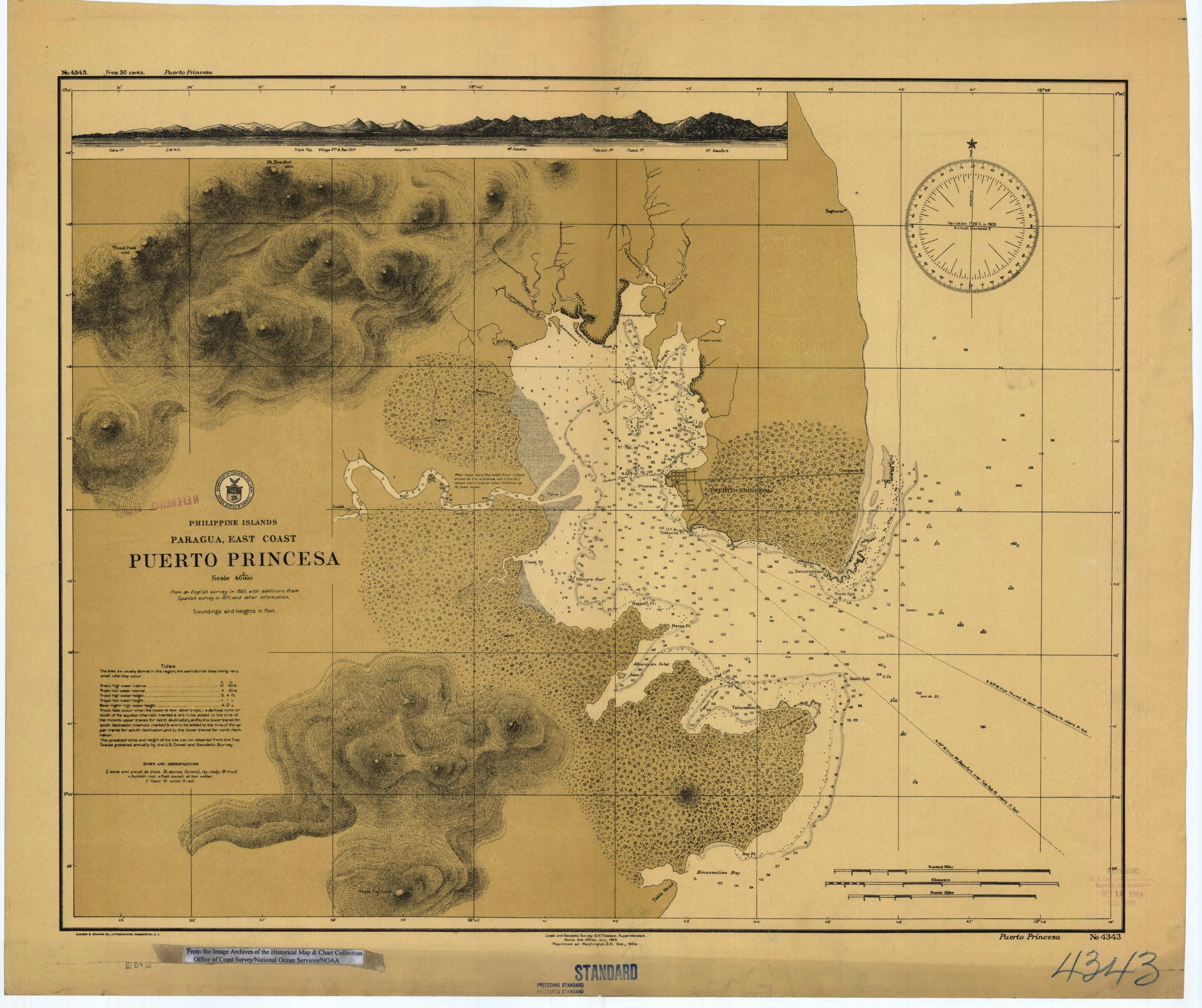
A 1904 nautical chart of Puerto Princesa's harbor

After Spanish colonizers founded the settlement of Puerto Princesa on 4 March 1872 and in May 1872, its port became the center of Spanish Naval Operations in the area because the Bay met all the Navy’s requirements, as it was deep enough for all types of vessels, well-sheltered from any adverse weather condition and out of the typhoon belt. Royal Decrees later provided incentives to settlers, and by 1883 the settlement had flourished into a town with many infrastructures, among them its well-built port.

PMO Puerto Princesa was organized on June 1, 1977 by the Systems Implementation Group (SIG) of the Philippine Ports Authority. This group laid the groundwork for the PMO and held office at a rented structure standing on submerged stilts. It coordinated the smooth turnover of properties and port responsibilities from the then Department of Public Works and Highways and the Bureau of Customs, respectively.

The SIG recruited 15 personnel to form the organizational backbone of operations, security, finance, administration and engineering. From the original 15 personnel, the PMO has now 50 regular employees, 9 casuals, 20 outsourced personnel and 38 agency security guards.

The PMO embarked on expanding operations to Coron, El Nido, Culion, Cuyo, Brooke's Point and the cluster ports of Liminangcong, Taytay (poblacion), Roxas, Narra, San Vicente and Araceli.

It is located in a cove in Southeastern Palawan, and the port is open to cargoes (foreign/domestic; general/containerized) and passengers.

Bottled cargoes, construction materials, general consumer goods to other finished products are just some of the various cargoes coming in the port. Outgoing cargoes include marine and agricultural products, live animals, furniture, coconut products and other raw materials.

== Location and facility ==
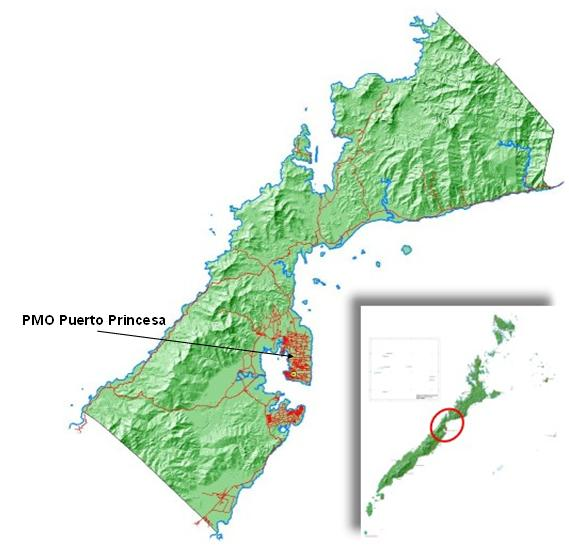
Map showing the location of the port in the city, as well as in the island.

The Port is connected to the City Proper with two-lane concreted road from Rizal Avenue and another two-lane concreted road from Malvar Street. Slight traffic is experienced during the arrival and departure of vessels. Yet both approaches have steep slopes giving difficult accessibility to people.

The port is notably out of the prevailing typhoon belt, and is sheltered enough from any such conditions. Seabed is muddy and free from rocks. Tidal currents are not strong and the range is 1.30 meters between MHHW and MLLW.

The bay area is aided by two rotating lighthouses – one in the northern tip of the bay entrance and the other is in the middle of the northern shore of the bay.

The port is also undergoing security, navigational, equipment improvements and various repairs.

== Awards ==
- Most Environment Friendly Port of the Philippines
- Founder of PPA's Puerto Gwapo Program
