= National Museum of the Philippines – Iloilo =

National Museum in Iloilo City

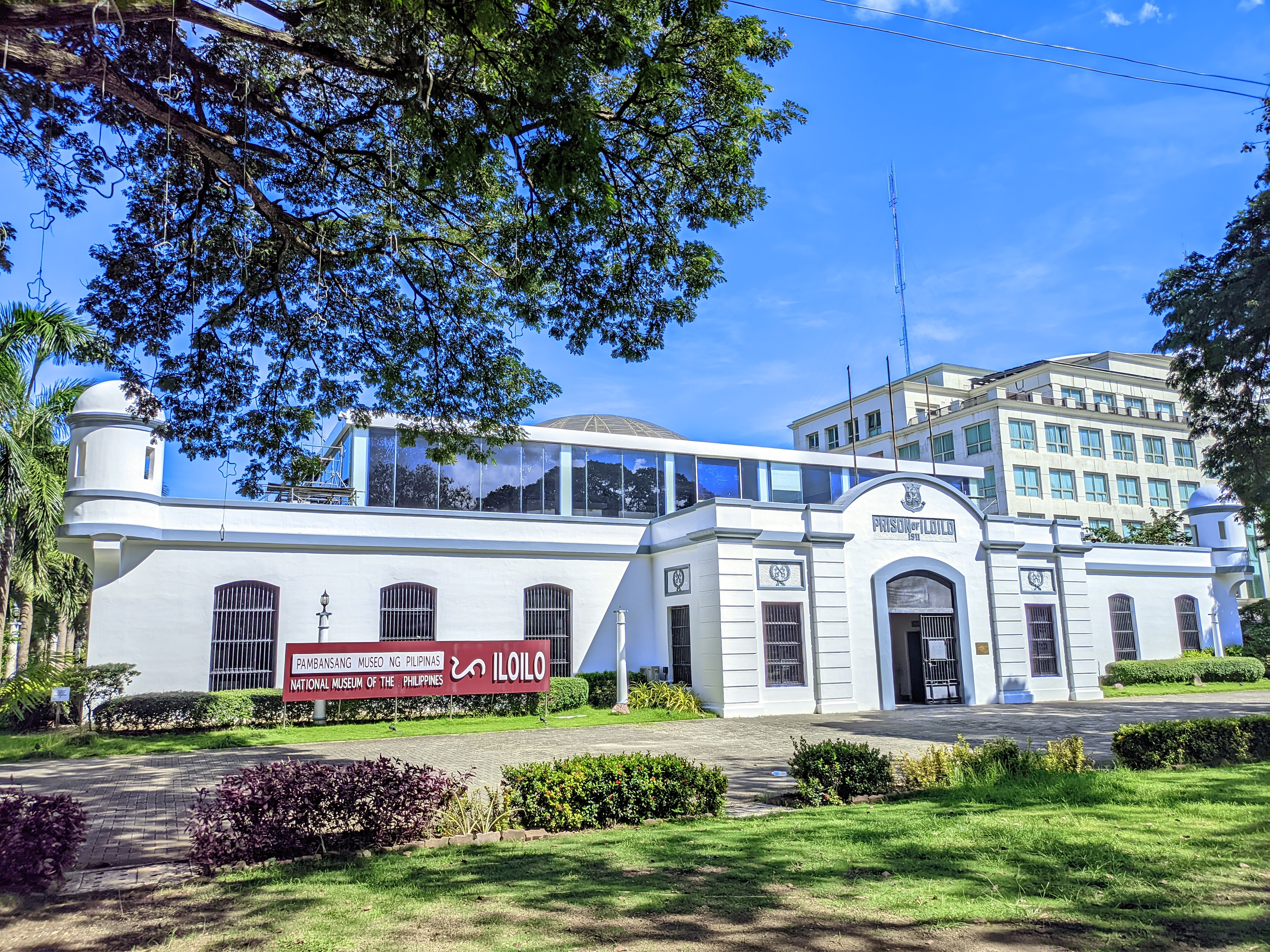
- Iloilo Provincial Jail as a museum, November 2025.
- Established: 2017
- Location: Iloilo Provincial Jail and Old Jaro Municipal Hall buildings, Iloilo City, Philippines
- Coordinates: 10°42′11.6″N 122°34′7.56″E
- Type: Regional museum
- Owner: National Museum of the Philippines
- Building details
- Alternative names: Iloilo Provincial Jail; Iloilo Rehabilitation Center

General information
- Current tenants: National Museum of the Philippines – Iloilo
- Inaugurated: 1911
- Renovated: 2016
- Owner: National Museum of the Philippines

Design and construction
- Architect: William E. Parsons

The National Museum of the Philippines – Iloilo, also known as the National Museum Western Visayas and the Iloilo and Western Visayas Regional Museum, is a museum in Iloilo City, Philippines, housed in the former Iloilo Provincial Jail, also known as the Iloilo Rehabilitation Center. The building was constructed in 1911 and served as the provincial jail until 2006. It is located within the Iloilo Provincial Capitol Complex in Iloilo City Proper. In addition to the building, the Old Jaro Municipal Hall in the district of Jaro is also part of the museum.

== History ==
The National Museum Western Visayas is housed in the Iloilo Provincial Jail which was built in 1911 and used until its abandonment in the 2000s, after a replacement facility was built in 2006. Its satellite office would be at the Old Jaro Municipal Hall which was given to the National Museum of the Philippines (NMP) in 2014 along with the jail building.

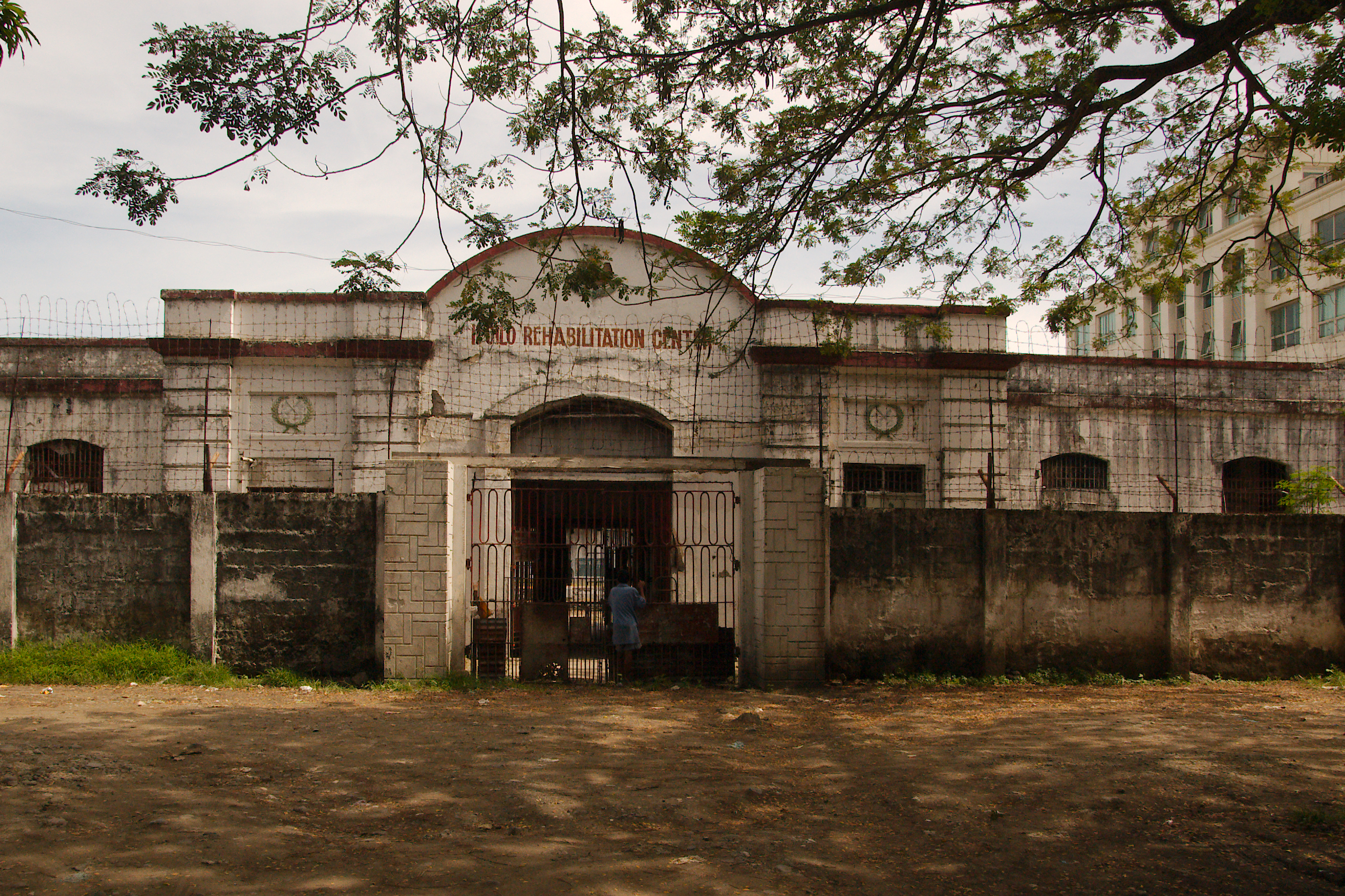
Iloilo Provincial Jail as a rehabilitation center, 2012

The old prison building was converted into a museum by Lim Construction and Trading, a process which began in 2016. A dome structure was added. In February 2017, the NMP Western Visayas satellite office was established after the renovated Old Jaro Municipal Hall was inaugurated.

On April 11, 2018, a turnover ceremony of the renovated ex-prison building to the NMP was held and the museum was inaugurated as the National Museum Western Visayas.

== Galleries and collections ==
The museum has five galleries on its lower floor and an open gallery on its second floor. It houses artifacts from different parts of the Western Visayas region.

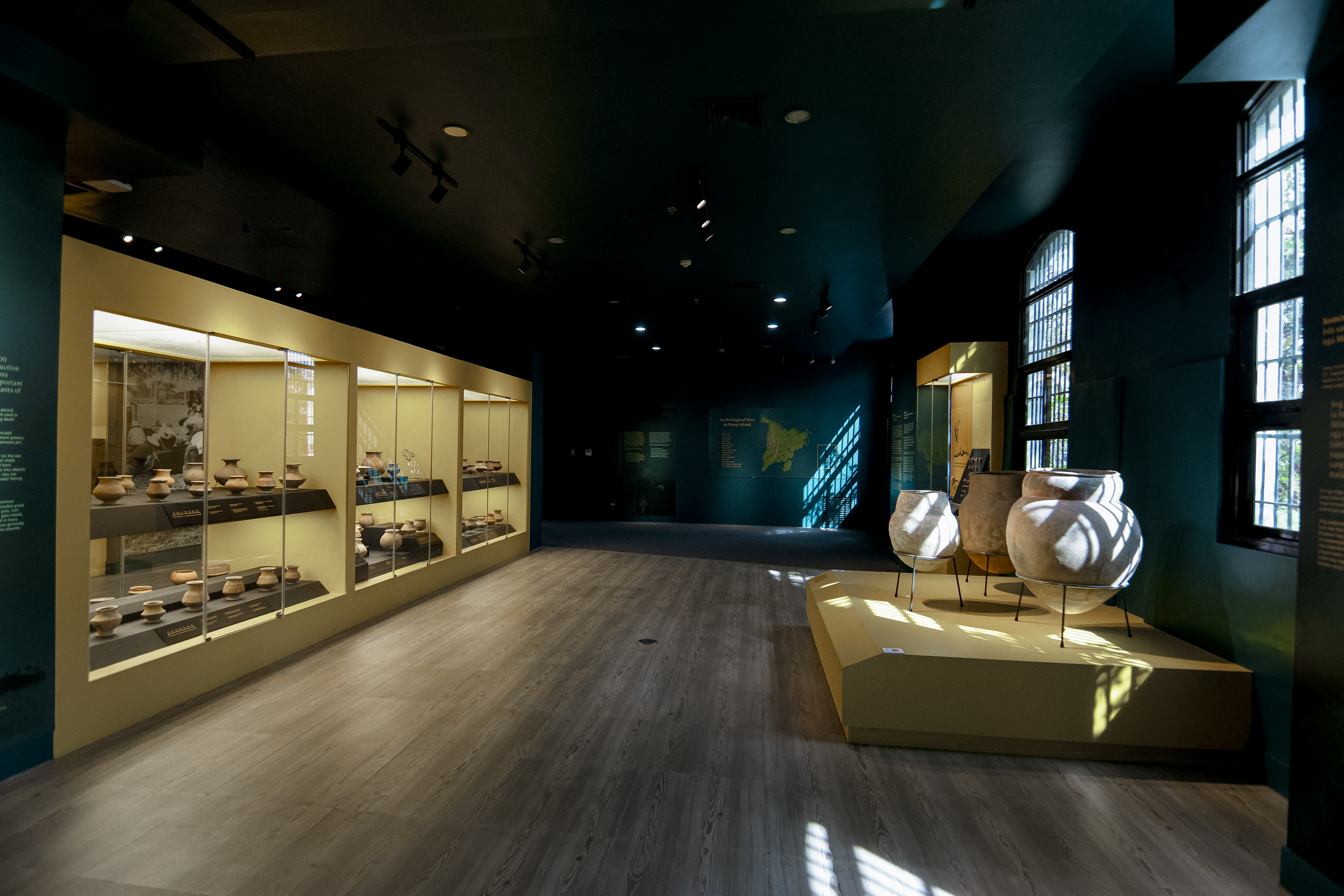

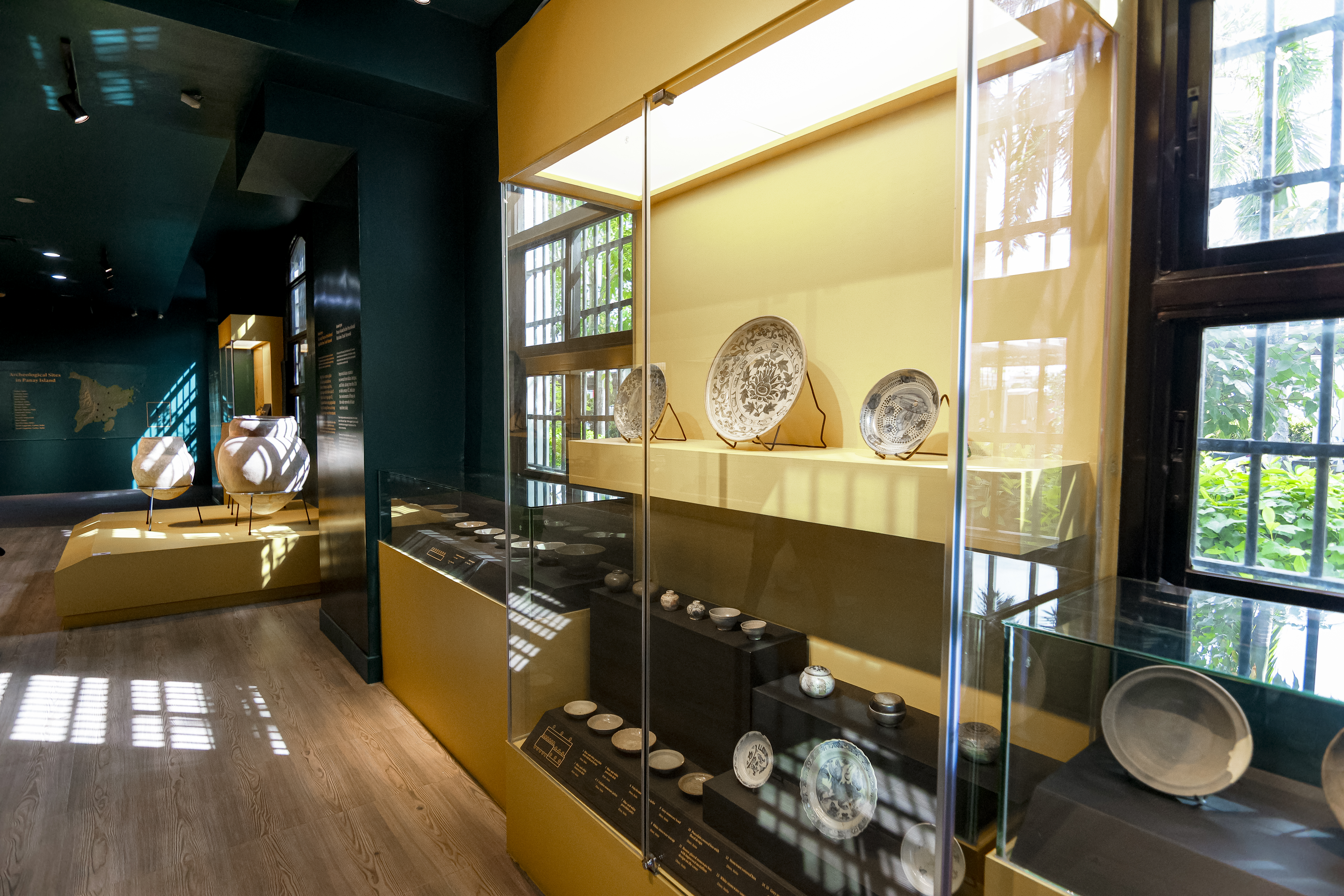

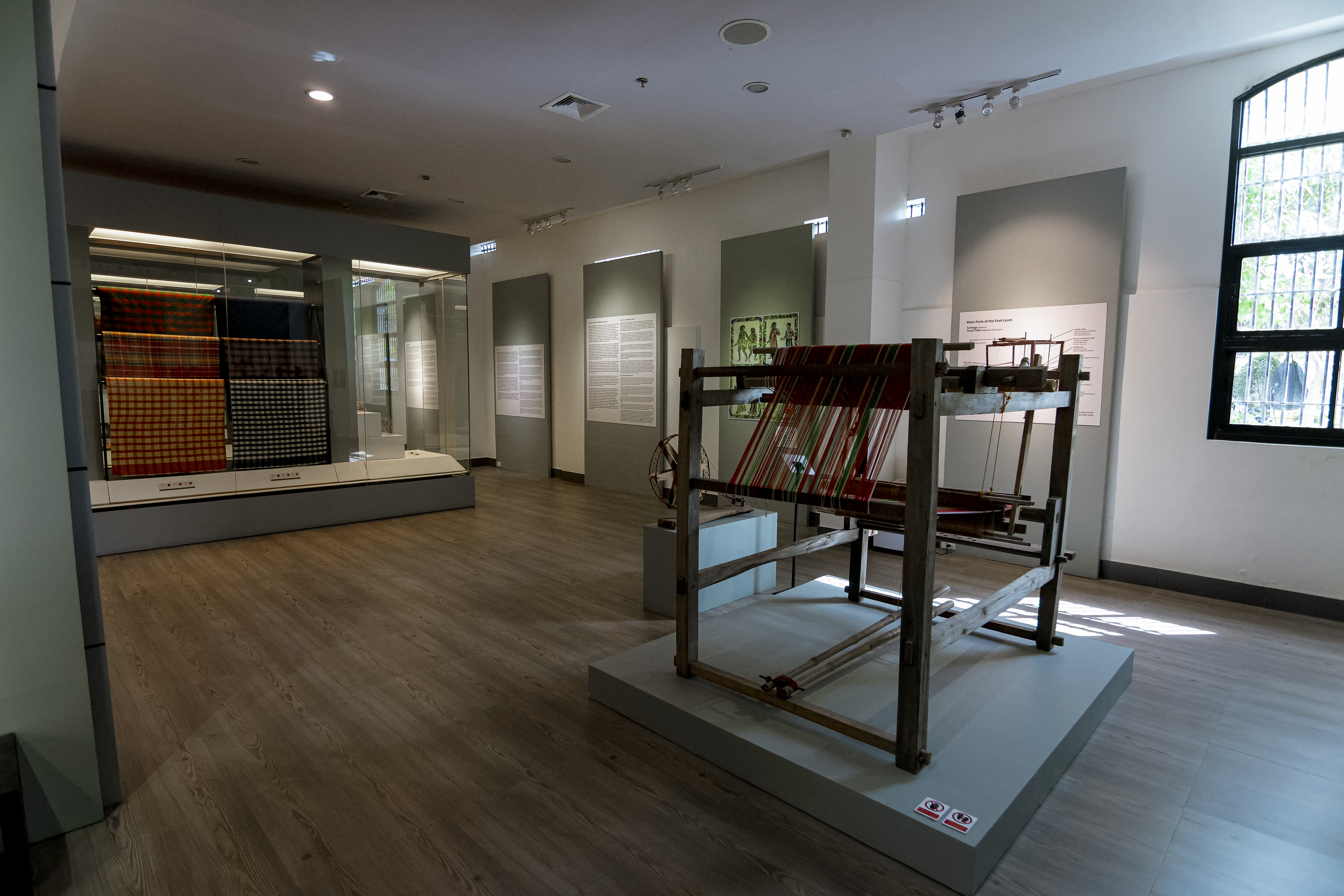

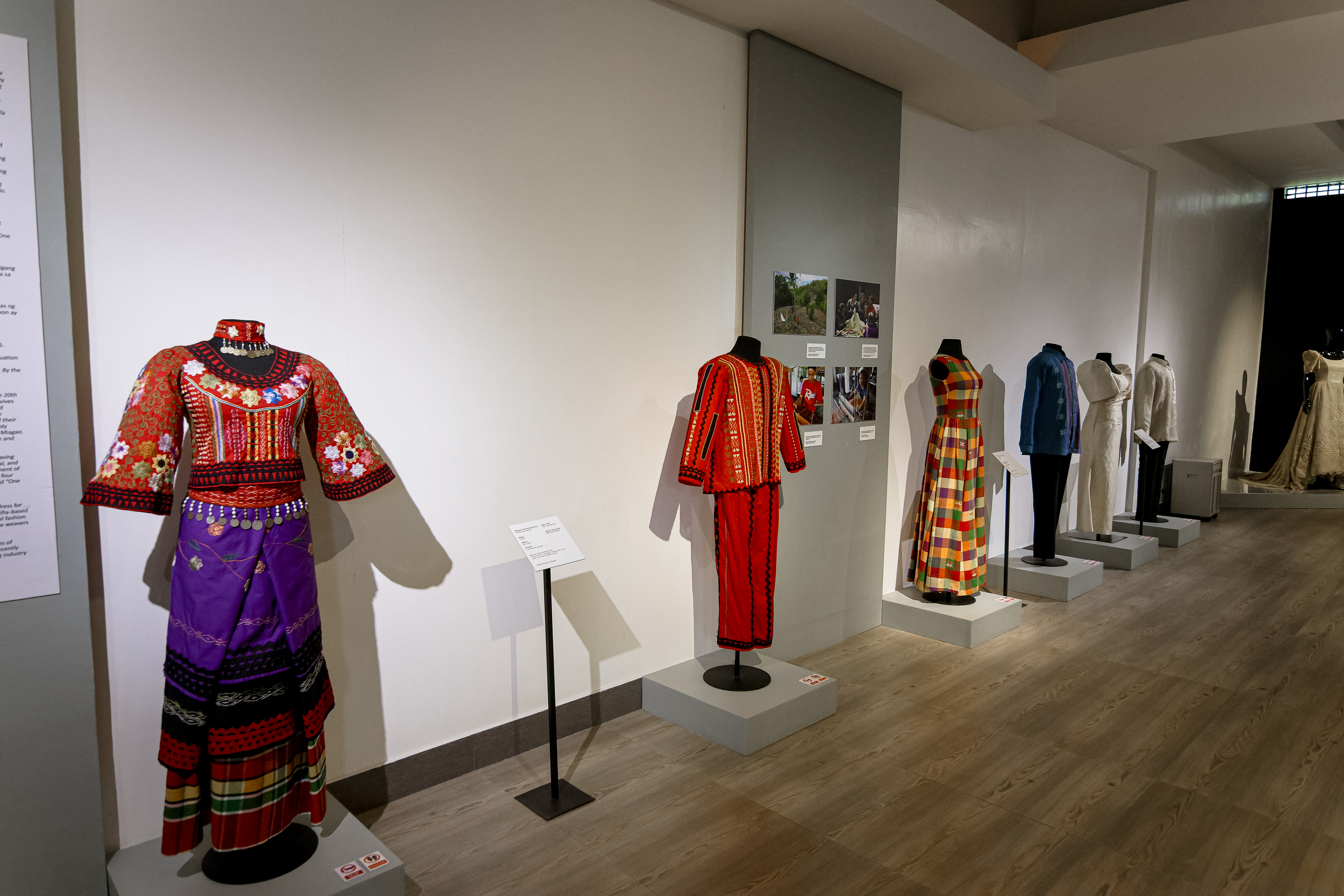

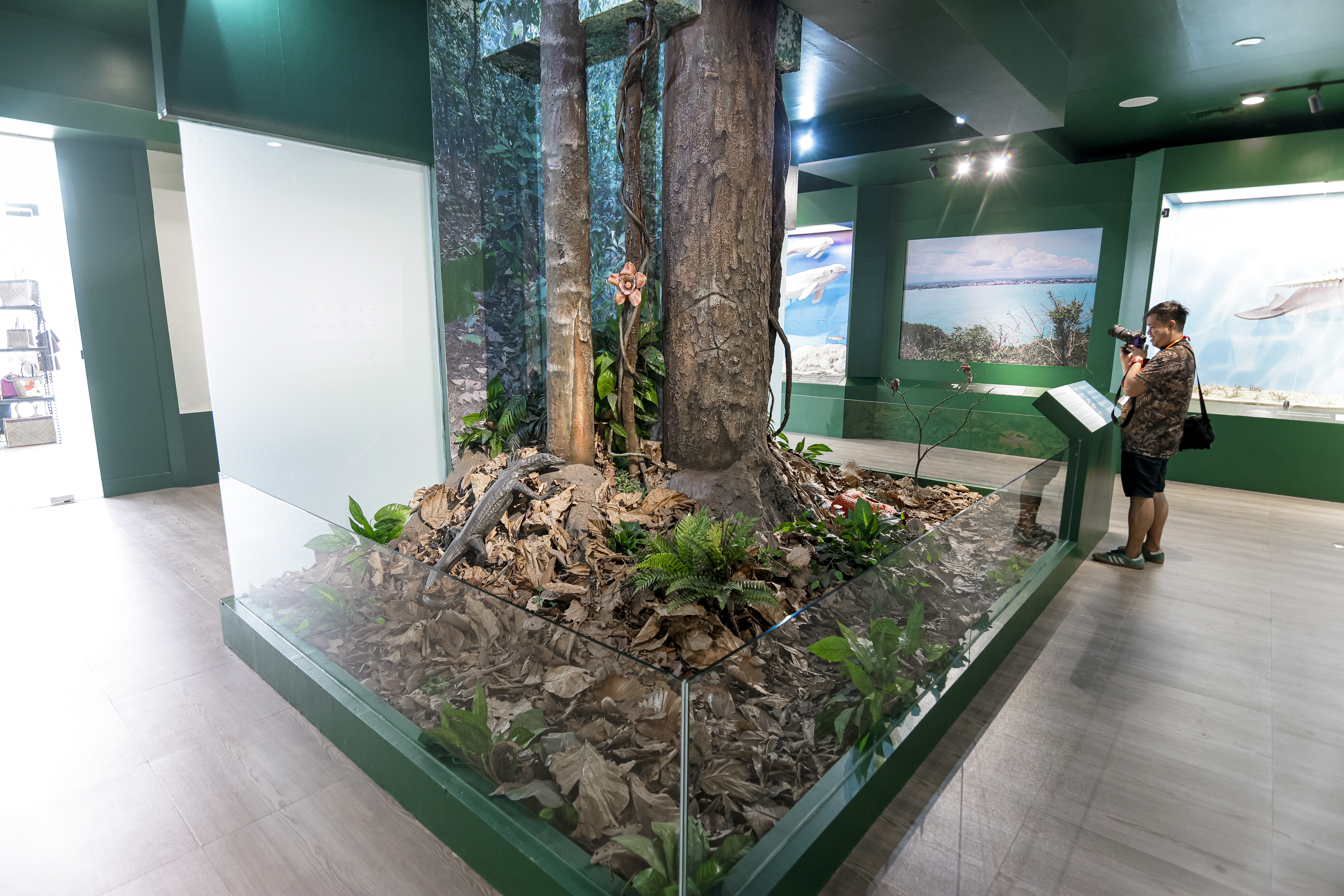

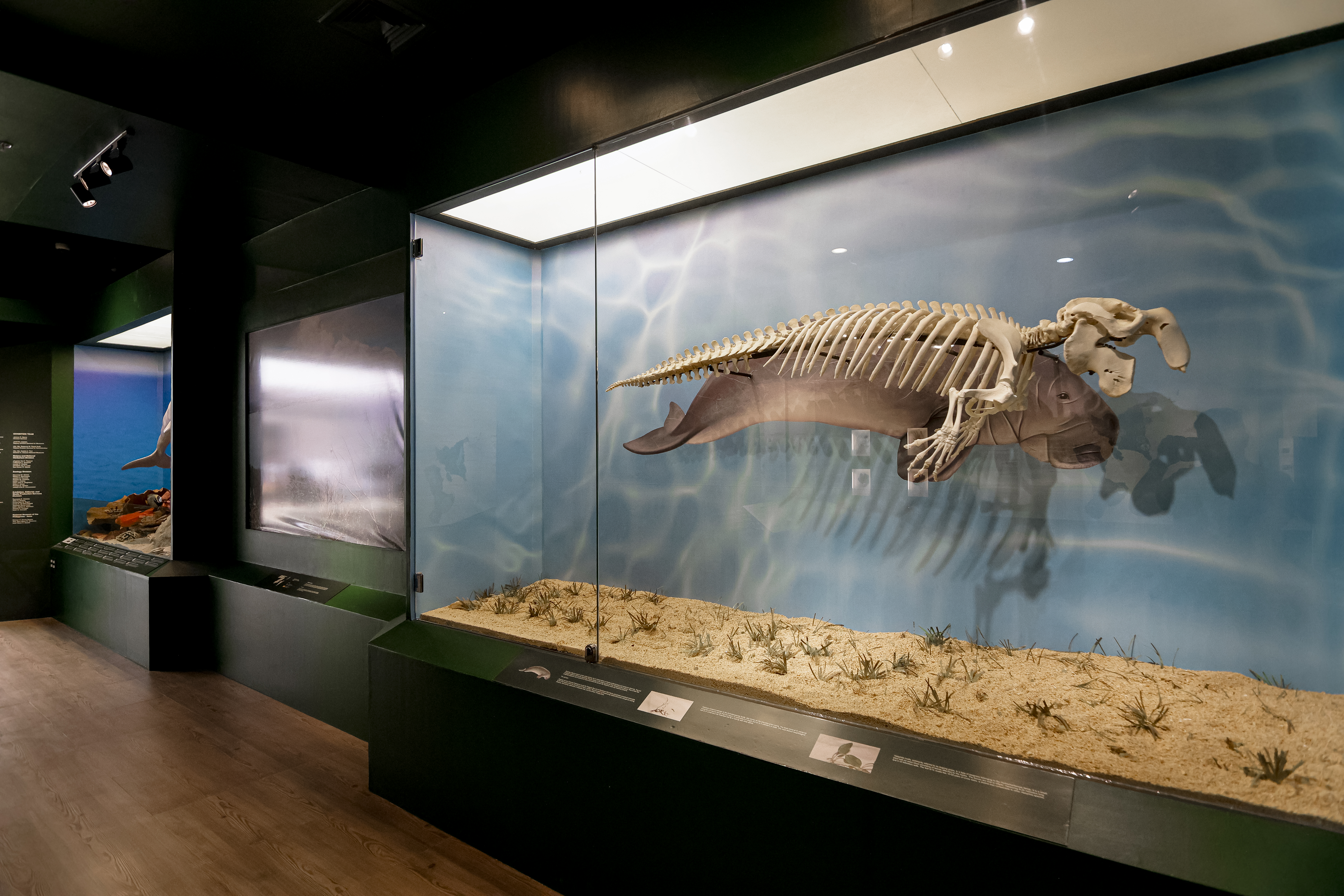
