= Old Jaro Municipal Hall =

Jaro Municipal Hall
- Municipio de Jaro (Spanish)
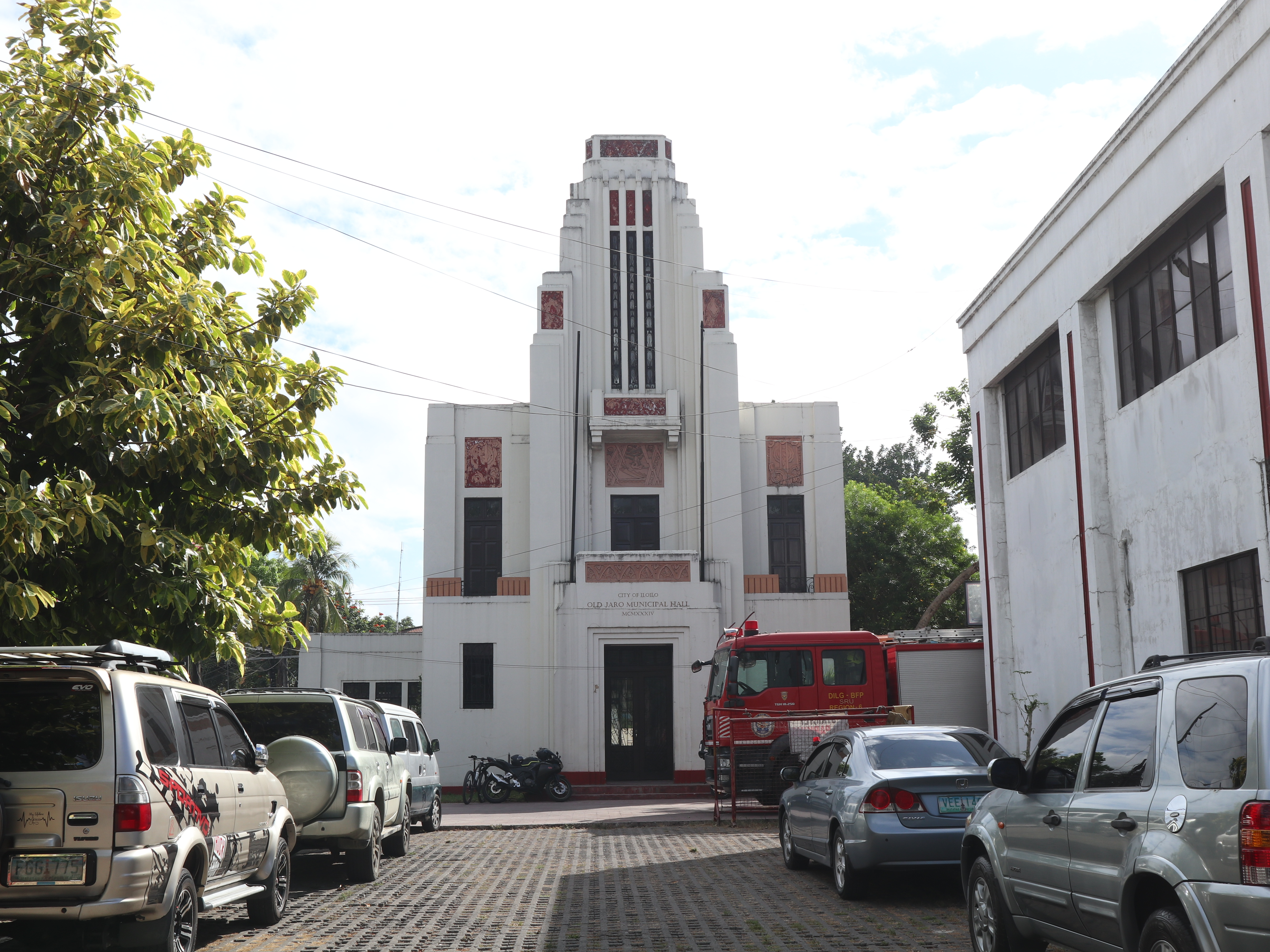
- Jaro Municipal Hall in 2024

General information
- Status: Completed
- Architectural style: Art Deco
- Location: Jaro, Iloilo City, Philippines
- Coordinates: 10°43′32″N 122°33′28″E
- Current tenants: National Museum Western Visayas
- Completed: 1934
- Renovated: 2017
- Renovation cost: ₱20 million
- Owner: Local Government of Iloilo CIty

Technical details
- Material: Mixed concrete
- Floor count: 2
- Floor area: Less than 100 m^{2} (1,100 sq ft)

Design and construction
- Architect: Juan Arellano

The old Jaro Municipal Hall (Spanish: Municipio de Jaro) is a heritage building which previously served as the seat of government of the former city of Jaro in Iloilo province, Philippines.

== History ==
=== Construction and use ===
The Old Municipal Hall was built by the Demetrio Ledesma, who was the presidente municipal of Jaro which was then a separate administrative unit from Iloilo City. In 1933, the building was under construction and was completed in 1934. In 1941, Jaro was absorbed into Iloilo City which meant that the building no longer functions as a municipal hall. It was then used as the headquarters of Jaro's police and the Jaro Health Center and Jaro Fire Station would be built besides the building.

In 2014, the Iloilo City Council approved an ordinance that donated the building to the National Museum of the Philippines so that the organization can use the building as a regional office. Restoration works was done on the building which costed around ₱20 million. In 2017, the National Museum moved to the building and established a satellite office for Region 6 (Western Visayas). The National Museum also uses the building as a site for its training, conferences, seminars and other services.

The building was returned to the ownership of the Iloilo CIty government by the NMP on February 28, 2024.

== Architecture ==
Juan Arellano is the architect of the Art deco building. The historic building is 2-storeys high, made from a mix of concrete, and has a footprint of less than 100 square meters (1,100 sq ft).

== Heritage designation ==
Iloilo City lone district representative Jerry Treñas authored the Republic Act 1055 or the "An Act Declaring the Jaro Cathedral, Molo Church, The Iloilo City Central Business District, Fort San Pedro, Jaro Plaza Complex, Molo Plaza Complex and Plaza Libertad Complex" which declared historic sites in Iloilo City which includes the former municipal hall as part of a Cultural Heritage Tourism Zone. This led to the restoration of the building. After the rehabilitation efforts of the building was completed, the National Museum of the Philippines declared the site as an "Important Cultural Property" on February 17, 2017.

== Gallery ==
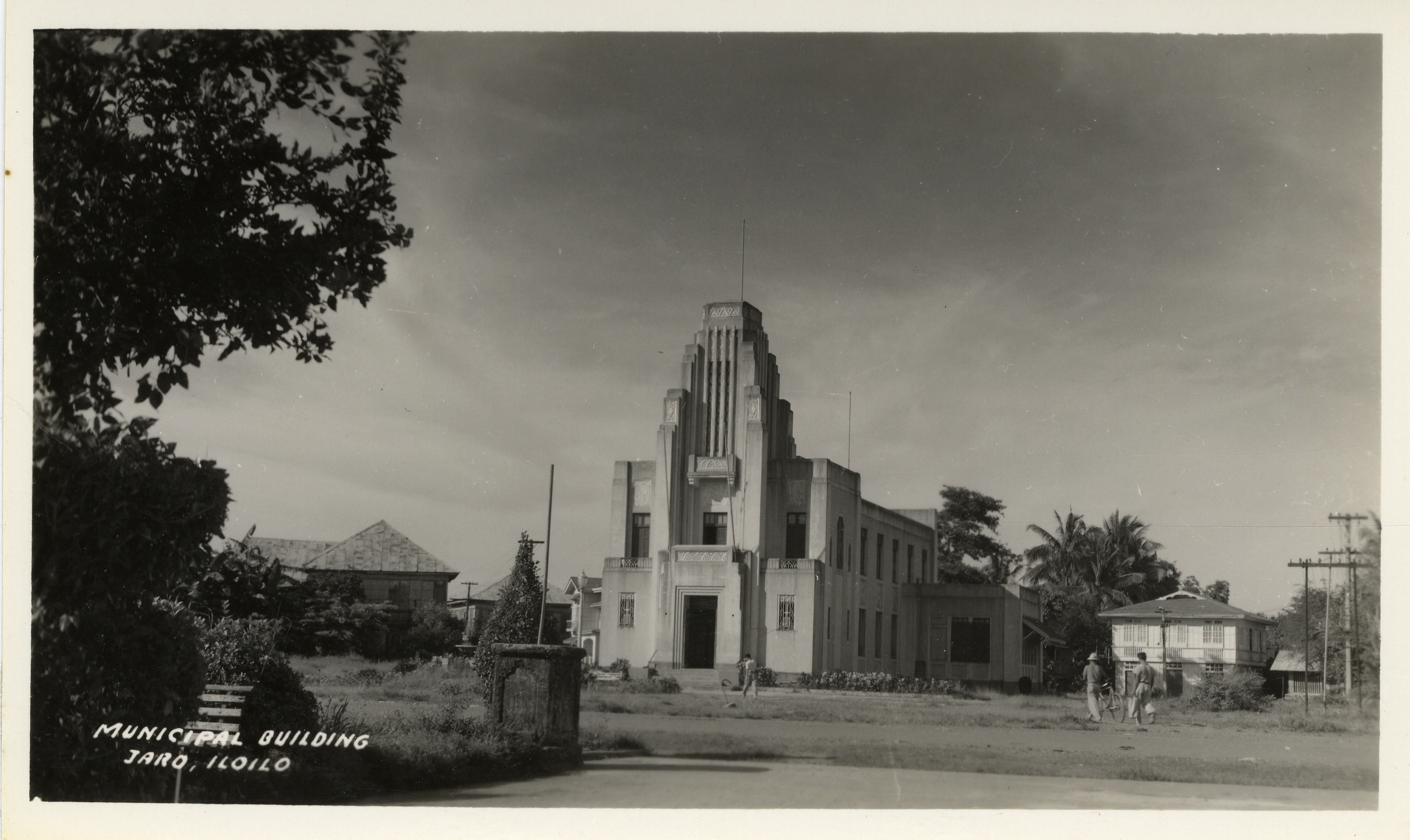
Building c. 1920–1940

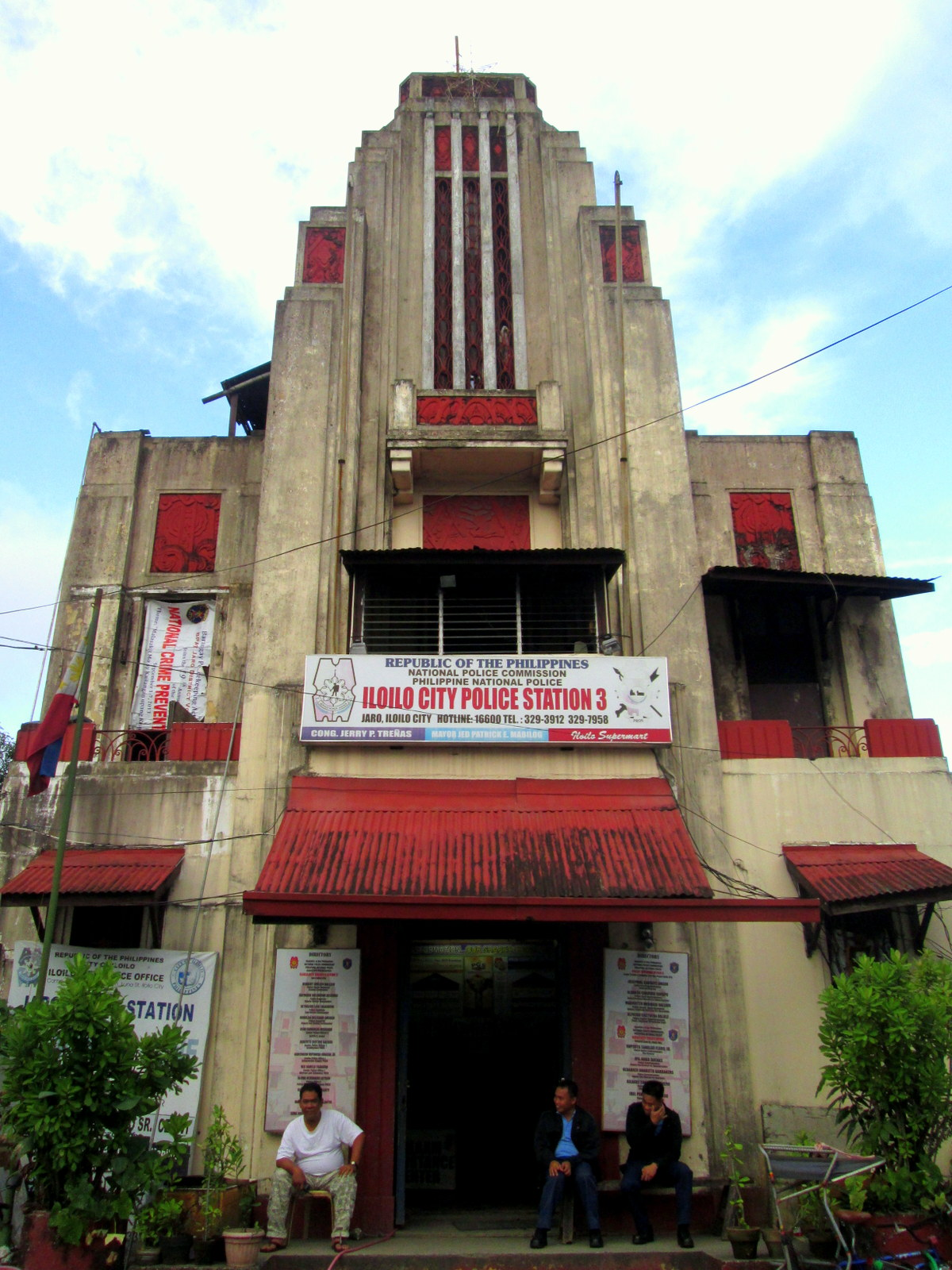
The building in 2011 as a police station prior to its renovation

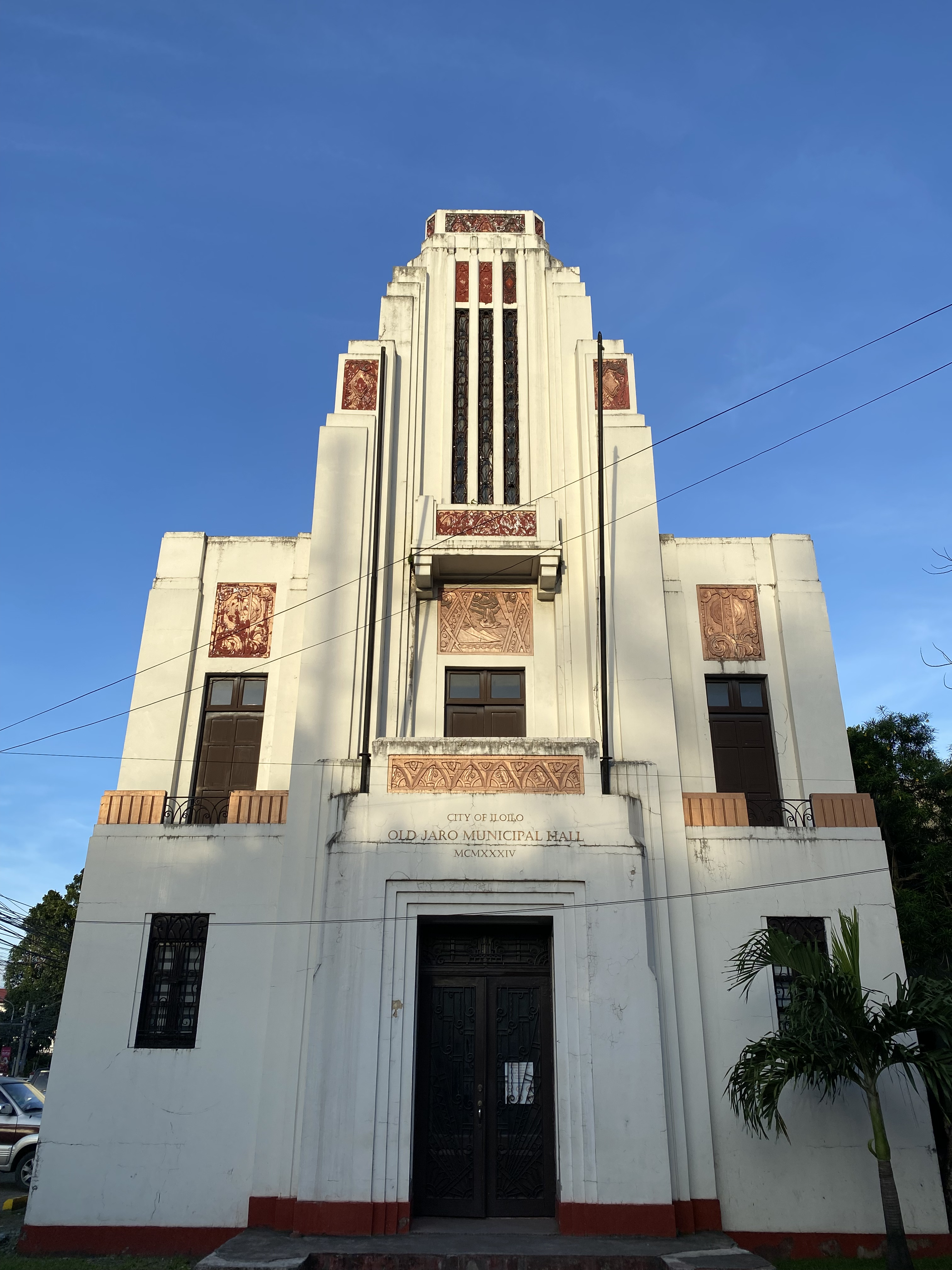
Closeup of façade

The building and its immediate vicinity. January 2026
