= Iloilo Central Business District =

Historic district in Iloilo City, Philippines

Iloilo Central Business District Calle Real Heritage Zone
- Historic district
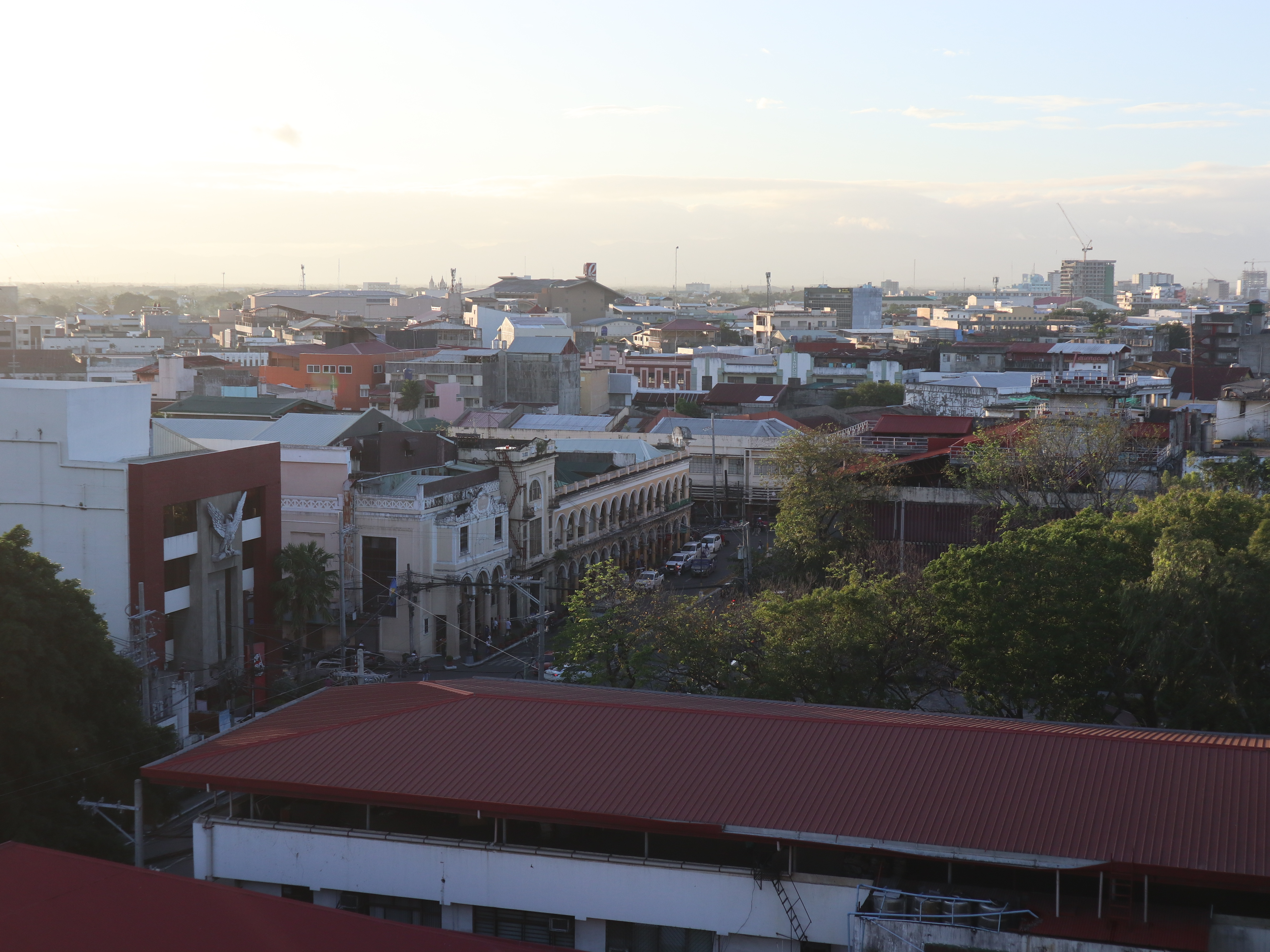
- Aerial view of Iloilo CBD
- Interactive map of Iloilo Central Business District
- Location within Visayas, Philippines Location within Philippines
- Coordinates: 10°41′37″N 122°34′17″E
- Country: Philippines
- Province: Iloilo (geographically only)
- City: Iloilo City
- District: Iloilo City Proper

Area
  - Total: 26 ha (64 acres)
- Time zone: UTC+8 (Philippine Standard Time)
- ZIP Codes: 5000

The Iloilo City Central Business District (Filipino: Distritong Pangkomersyo ng Lungsod ng Iloilo), commonly known as the Calle Real Heritage Zone and colloquially as Old Downtown Iloilo, is a historic commercial district located within the larger district of City Proper in Iloilo City, Philippines. It served as the city's center of commerce and culture from the Spanish colonial period through the American era and into the postwar years. The district encompasses major thoroughfares such as Calle Real and Iznart Street, along with minor surrounding roads including Aldeguer, Guanco, Mapa, Ortiz, and Rizal Streets. It is notable for its concentration of neoclassical, beaux-arts, and art deco architecture dating back to the colonial period.

In 2013, the heritage zone has been declared as one of Iloilo City's Cultural Heritage Tourism Zones along with Plaza Jaro Heritage Zone, Plaza Molo Heritage Zone, Plaza Libertad, and Fort San Pedro through Republic Act Number 10555.

In 2014, the National Historical Commission of the Philippines (NHCP) declared the area a heritage zone under Resolution No. 3, s. 2014, in recognition of its historical and architectural significance. It is also being proposed by the UNESCO National Commission of the Philippines for inclusion in the country’s tentative list of future UNESCO World Heritage Sites, under the title "Historic Center of Iloilo City (Calle Real)" as part of the serial nomination "The Sugar Cultural Landscape of Negros and Panay Islands".

== History ==
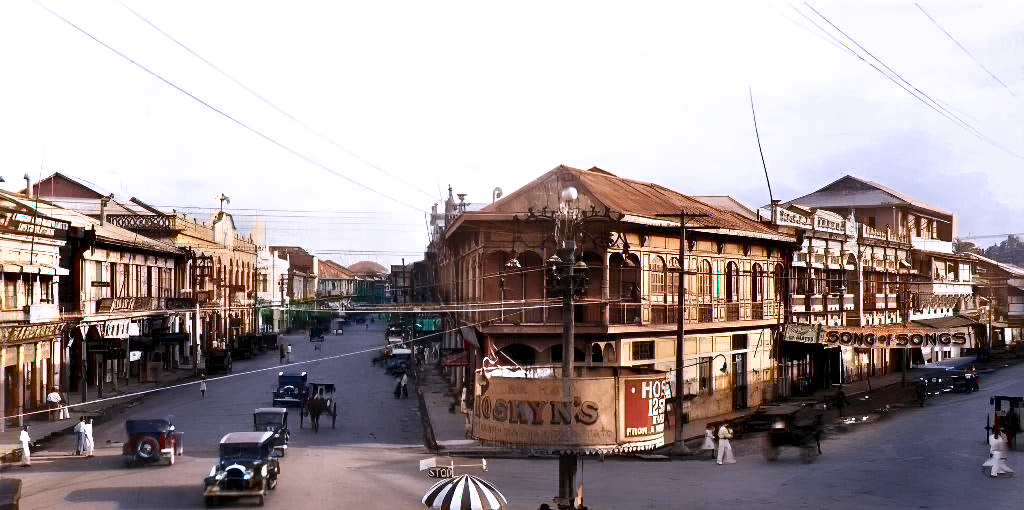
Calle Real and Calle Iznart, circa late 19th century

During the Spanish colonial period, Iloilo rose to prominence as one of the leading port cities in the Philippines. Calle Real developed as the city’s main thoroughfare of commerce, lined with trading houses and shops that catered to both local and international merchants. National hero José Rizal, during his visit in the late 19th century, remarked on the city’s prosperity and elegance.

Under the American colonial administration, the district expanded into a modern commercial hub. Calle Real became the center of high-end shopping, with stores selling imported goods from Europe. The street was officially renamed in honor of José Maria Basa, a Filipino businessman and propagandist contemporary of Rizal, although it continued to be popularly called Calle Real. Over time, the term came to refer not only to the street itself but also to the wider commercial district.

In the 20th century, the district flourished as Iloilo’s premier business center. Department stores, banks, theaters, and office buildings were constructed, many designed in neoclassical, beaux-arts, and art deco styles. Economic changes and patterns of urban migration eventually led to the decline of several heritage structures, though the district continued to function as a hub of trade and commerce.

By the late 20th and early 21st centuries, commercial activity began shifting to other areas of the city, particularly Mandurriao, with the rise of developments such as the Iloilo Business Park. Revitalization efforts were subsequently launched for Calle Real and the heritage district, including façade restorations, the underground installation of utility lines, the passage of stricter heritage conservation ordinances, and cultural programs aimed at promoting the area as both a commercial and tourist destination.

== Geography ==
The Iloilo Central Business District (CBD) is located within the City Proper district of Iloilo City, Philippines. The local government defines the boundaries of the CBD’s Heritage Core as the area bounded by Calle Real and Muelle Loney Street to the east, Plazoleta Gay to the north, Iznart Street to the west, portions of Rizal, Guanco, and Mapa Streets to the south, and Ortiz Street to the southeast. The Heritage Core covers a total area of approximately 14 hectares (0.14 km^{2}).

The CBD's Conservation Expanded Area, which extends north to Yulo Street, further south along Rizal Street, and southeast to include the whole Iloilo City Civic Center, encompasses a total of 26 hectares (0.26 km^{2}).

Downtown Iloilo originally referred to the area now designated as the Iloilo Central Business District. As commercial development expanded within the City Proper, particularly toward Delgado and Valeria Streets, the definition of "downtown" broadened to include these newer areas. The Iloilo Central Business District consequently came to be known as Old Downtown Iloilo, distinguishing it from the larger Downtown Iloilo area that now encompasses much of the City Proper district.

== Architecture ==
Calle Real alone is noted for its concentration of early 20th-century commercial architecture. Many of the buildings along the street and its adjoining streets were constructed during the American colonial period, reflecting architectural styles such as neoclassical, beaux-arts, and art deco. Structures typically feature ornamented façades, arched windows, decorative pilasters, and cornices, while others incorporate streamlined geometric motifs characteristic of art deco design.

Some notable examples of architecture within the heritage zone

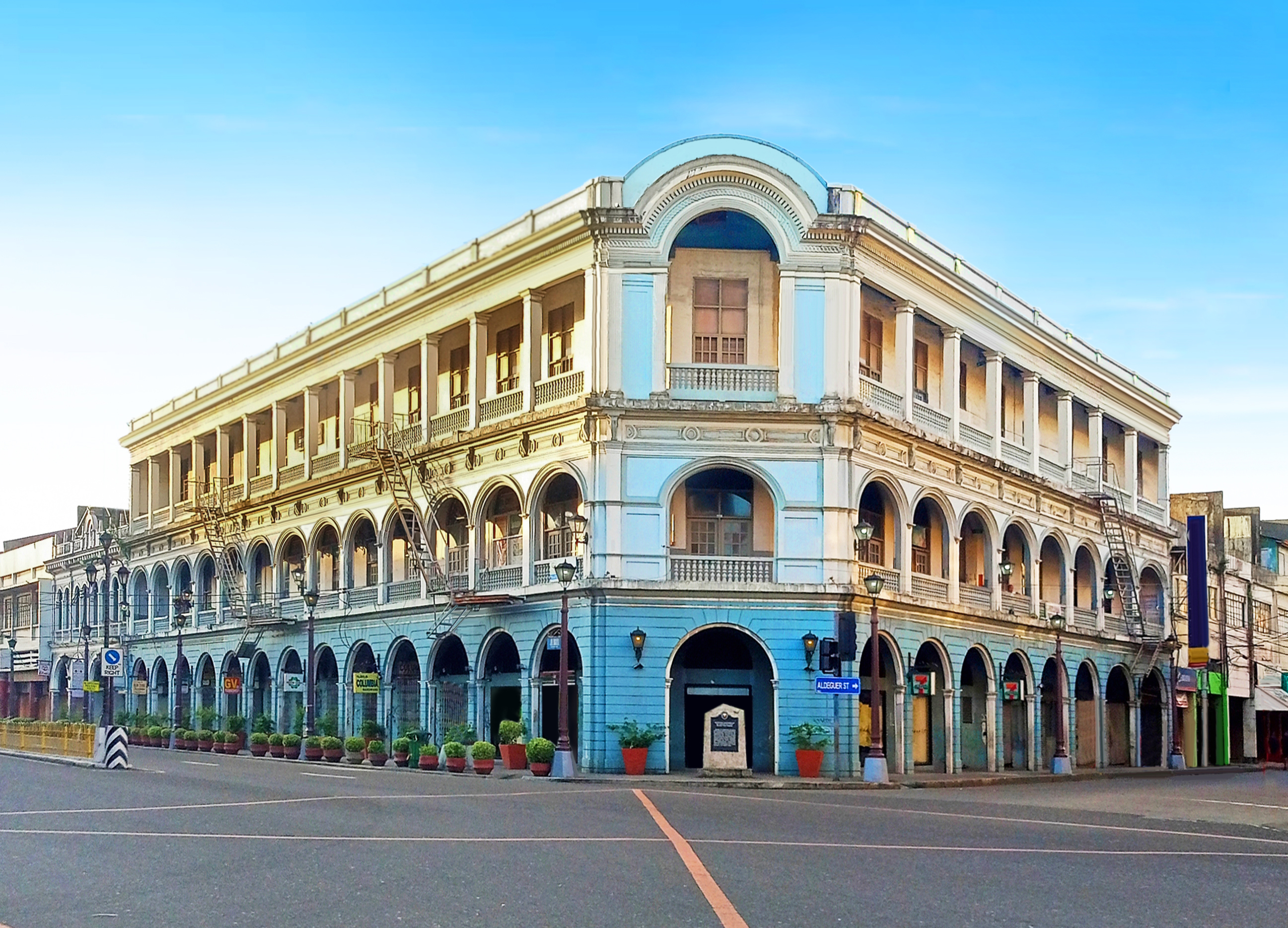
Neoclassical façade of the Eusebio Villanueva Building

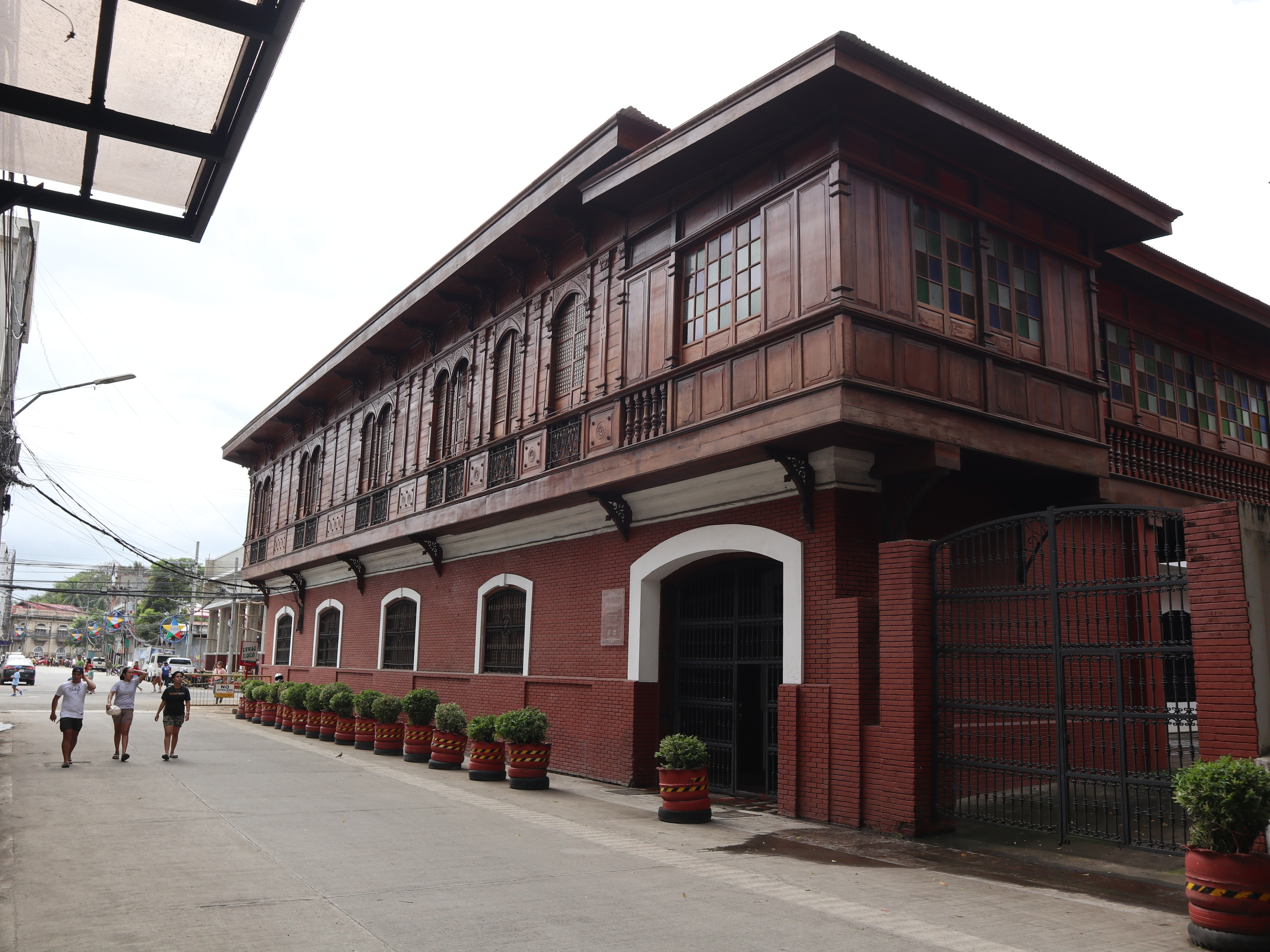
A bahay na bato style Elizalde Building

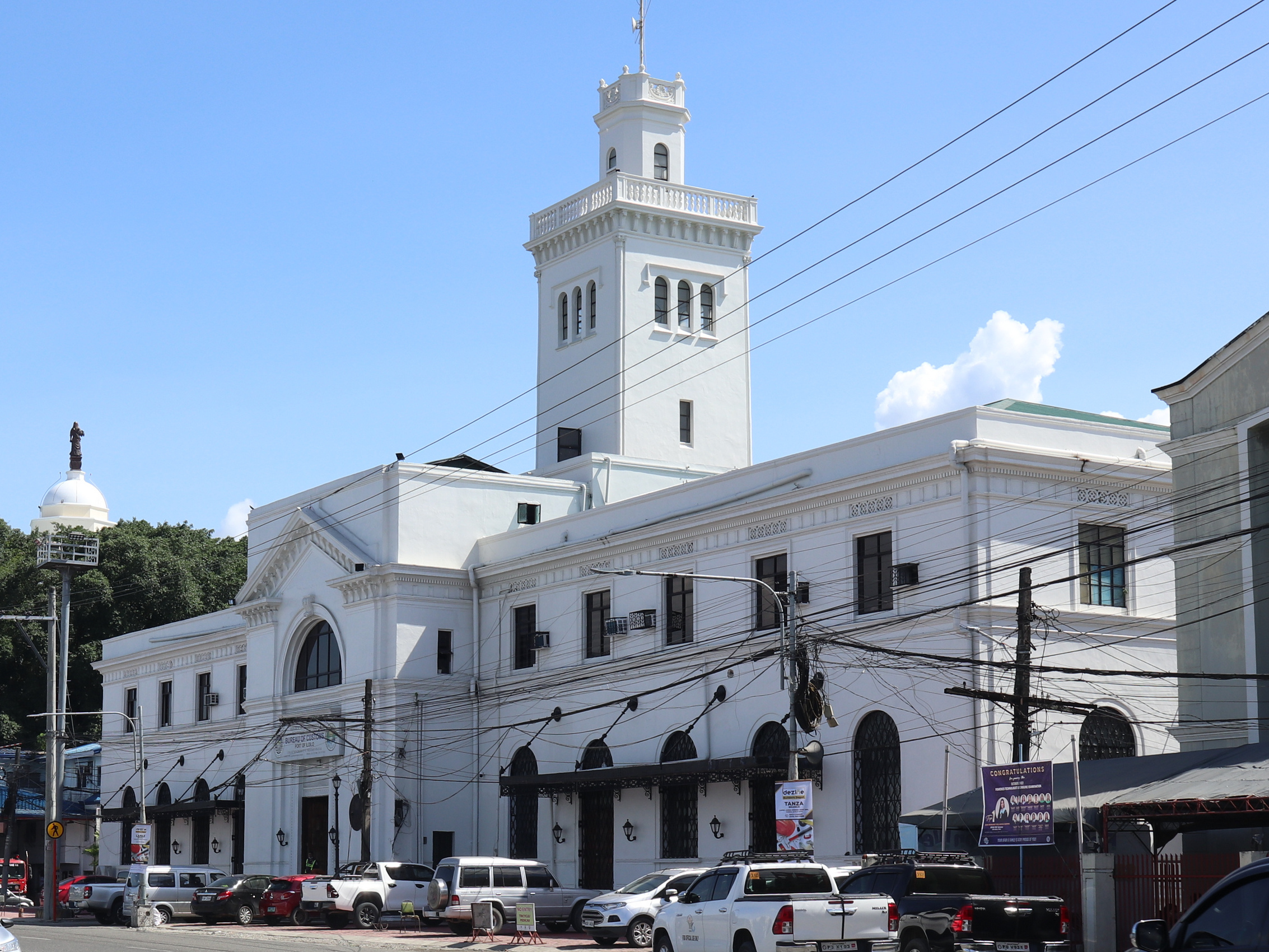
Iloilo Customs House features neoclassical and beaux-arts architecture

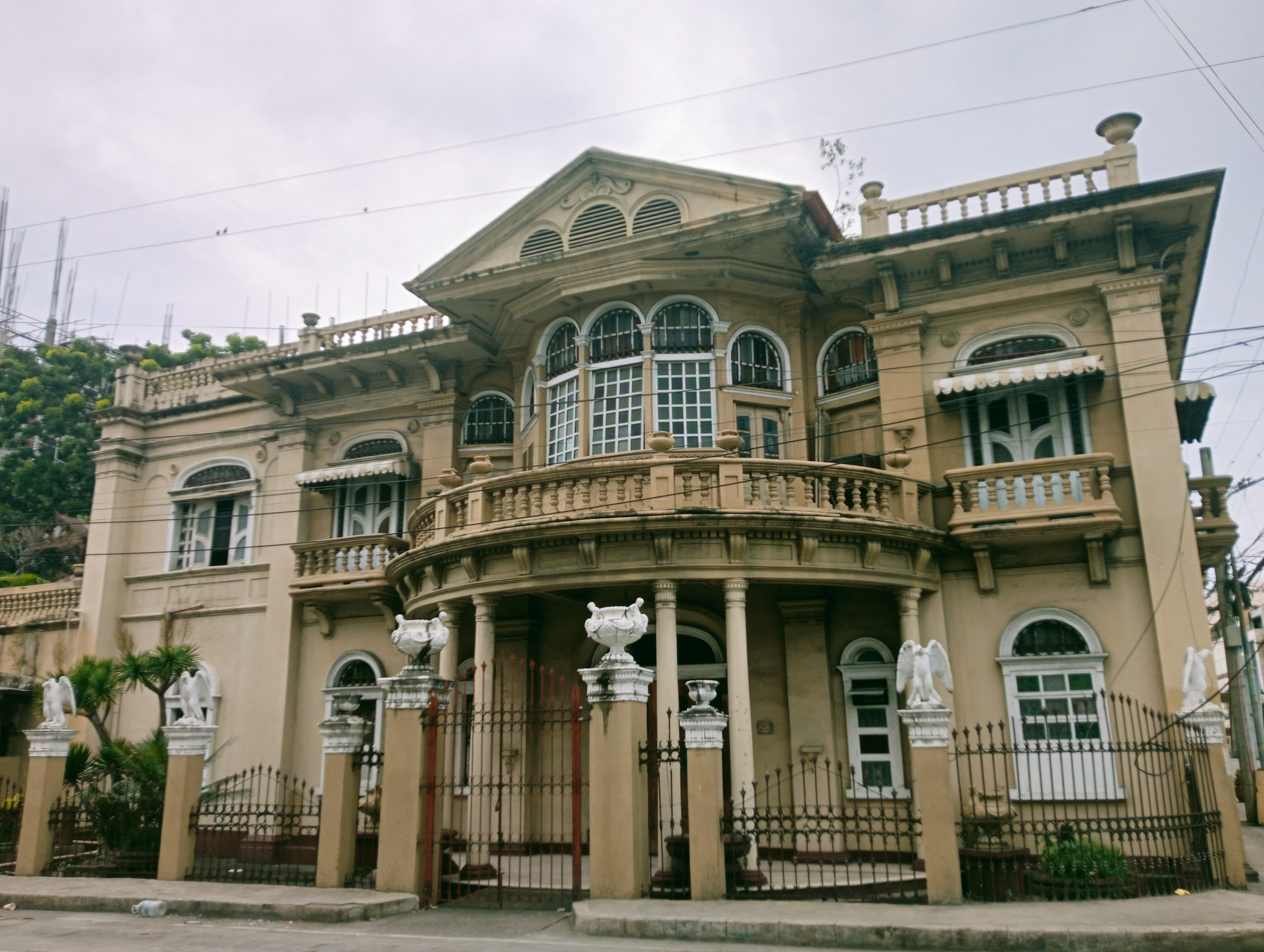
The Beaux-Arts Celso Ledesma Mansion

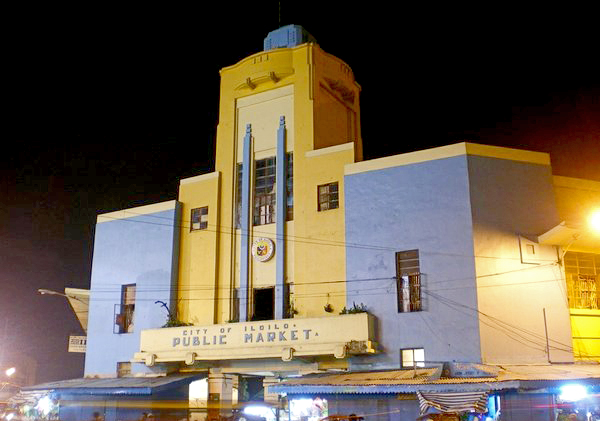
Art deco façade of Iloilo Central Market

Plaza Libertad with the modern neoclassical-art deco Iloilo City Hall

== Economy ==
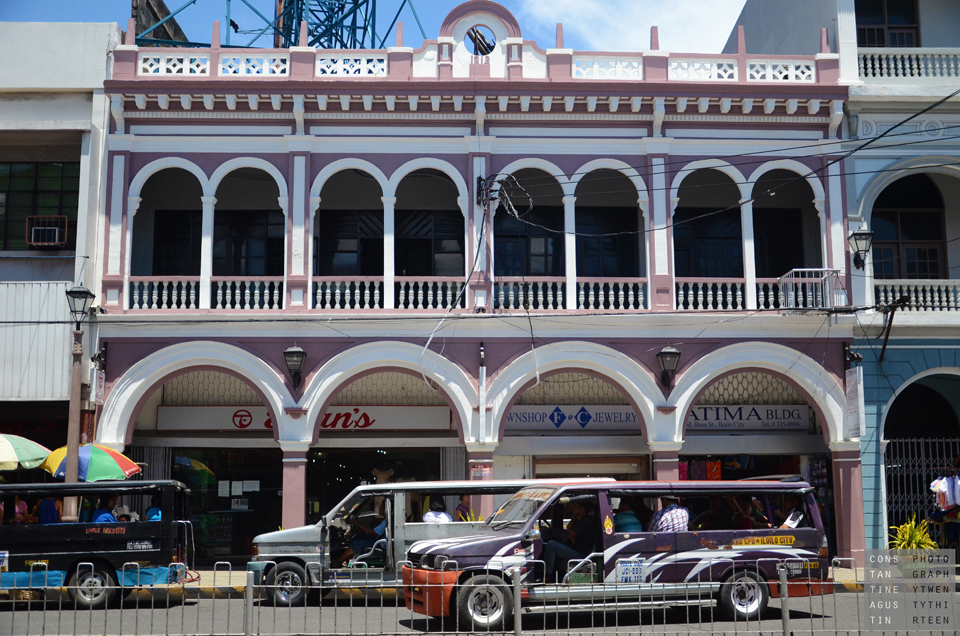
Shops along Calle Real

The commercial center of Iloilo City has historically been concentrated in Calle Real and its surrounding areas since the Spanish colonial period. The district served as the hub of commerce, banking, and finance, hosting major businesses, trading houses, and retail establishments.

In the 21st century, however, the city has experienced rapid modernization, and much of its economic activity has gradually shifted to newer business districts such as the Iloilo Business Park in Mandurriao. Despite this shift, the Iloilo Central Business District remains an active commercial area, supported by heritage-related tourism and local trade.

=== Tourism ===
The Iloilo Central Business District functions as both a commercial center and a heritage attraction. The district hosts walking tours, cultural events, and photography tours. Its preservation and adaptive reuse have reinforced Iloilo City’s reputation as one of the Philippines’ most well-preserved heritage cities.

In recent years, the area has undergone extensive rehabilitation projects led by the city government and private stakeholders. These include the underground installation of utility cables, the brick paving of streets and sidewalks, the repainting of historic façades, and the introduction of an occasional night market to promote economic and cultural activity.

== Designation as a Historic Center ==
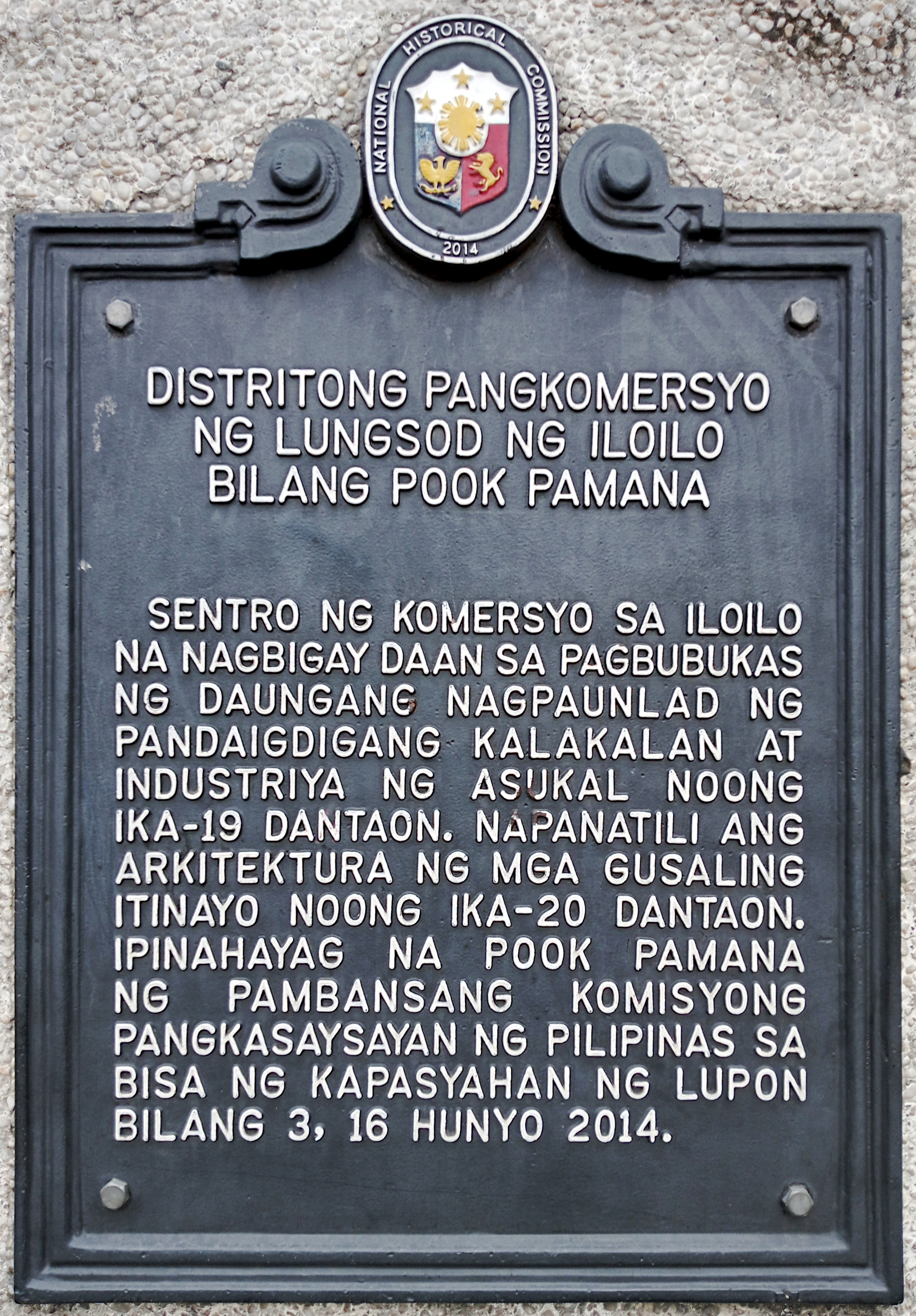
Historical marker of the Iloilo CBD as a heritage zone

The National Historical Commission of the Philippines (NHCP) board resolution cites several reasons for the declaration of certain areas in downtown Iloilo City as a Heritage Zone or Historic Center:

1. Iloilo City has long served as a major administrative and economic center in Western Visayas since the mid-19th century;
2. Iloilo City's growth was significantly influenced by the opening of the port to foreign trade in the 19th century, which led to increased commercial activity and the establishment of international businesses;
3. Calle Real was a melting pot for trade among locals, Europeans, Chinese, and Americans; and
4. Downtown Iloilo features well-preserved streets and buildings that showcase a variety of architectural styles, including neoclassical, art deco, beaux-arts, and postmodern architecture.

=== Declared sites ===
==== Heritage core ====
| Cultural Property wmph identifier (Note: wmph is an internal identifier used by Wikimedia Philippines to identify the monument. This is not an official identifier, and only shown temporarily in the templates until the government creates an updated complete list.) | Site name | Description | Province | City or municipality | Address | Coordinates | Image |
|---|---|---|---|---|---|---|---|
| | Celso Ledesma Building | Constructed in 1923, the commercial building now houses several well-known local establishments | Iloilo | City of Iloilo | J.M. Basa Street | 10°41′46″N 122°34′09″E | Upload file |
| | Dominican Sisters Building | Commercial building built in 1927 | Iloilo | City of Iloilo | J.M. Basa Street | 10°41′45″N 122°34′10″E | Upload file |
| | Pilar Building | Commercial building | Iloilo | City of Iloilo | J.M. Basa Street | 10°41′45″N 122°34′10″E | Upload file |
| | Javellana Building II | Twin commercial building built in 1950 and 1951 | Iloilo | City of Iloilo | J.M. Basa Street | 10°41′43″N 122°34′12″E | Upload file |
| | Iloilo Lucky Auto Supply Building | Commercial building, also known as the Ng Chin Beng Hermanos Building | Iloilo | City of Iloilo | J.M. Basa Street | 10°41′42″N 122°34′12″E | Upload file |
| | S. Villanueva Building | Commercial building constructed in 1927 | Iloilo | City of Iloilo | J.M. Basa Street | 10°41′42″N 122°34′13″E | Upload file |
| | S. Villanueva Building | Commercial building built in 1935 | Iloilo | City of Iloilo | J.M. Basa Street cor. Aldeguer Street | 10°41′41″N 122°34′13″E | Upload file |
| | Eusebio Villanueva Building | Built in 1927, formerly known as the Washington International Hotel. It hosted American, British, and Spanish patrons, as well as Chinese bankers and merchants. Considered the iconic landmark of Calle Real | Iloilo | City of Iloilo | J.M. Basa Street cor. Aldeguer Street | 10°41′40″N 122°34′14″E | Upload file |
| | Divinagracia Building | Commercial building | Iloilo | City of Iloilo | J.M. Basa Street | 10°41′39″N 122°34′14″E | Upload file |
| | Hoskyn's Department Store | Established in 1877, recognized as the first department store in the Philippines | Iloilo | City of Iloilo | J.M. Basa Street | 10°41′38″N 122°34′15″E | Upload file |
| | Javellana Building | Neo-Renaissance style commercial building constructed in 1922 | Iloilo | City of Iloilo | J.M. Basa Street cor. Guanco Street | 10°41′37″N 122°34′16″E | Upload file |
| | Iloilo Central Trading Building | Commercial building | Iloilo | City of Iloilo | J.M. Basa Street | 10°41′37″N 122°34′17″E | Upload file |
| | Regent Arcade Building | Built in 1928, it housed one of the first movie theaters in the country, Cine Palace, which operated for many years | Iloilo | City of Iloilo | J.M. Basa Street cor. Mapa Street | 10°41′36″N 122°34′17″E | Upload file |
| | Elizalde Building | A bahay na bato style building that now houses the Museum of Philippine Economic History | Iloilo | City of Iloilo | J.M. Basa Street cor. Ortiz Street | 10°41′36″N 122°34′21″E | Upload file |
| | Magdalena Building | Commercial building built in 1938 | Iloilo | City of Iloilo | J.M. Basa Street | 10°41′40″N 122°34′15″E | Upload file |
| | Serafin Villanueva Building | One of the Serafin Villanueva commercial buildings, located at the intersection of J.M. Basa Street and Arsenal Streets | Iloilo | City of Iloilo | J.M. Basa Street cor. Arsenal Streets | 10°41′44″N 122°34′12″E | Upload file |
| | Serafin Villanueva Building | One of the Serafin Villanueva commercial buildings, located at the intersection of J.M. Basa Street and Arsenal Streets, built in 1925 | Iloilo | City of Iloilo | J.M. Basa Street cor. Arsenal Streets | 10°41′45″N 122°34′12″E | Upload file |
| | Cacho Building | Demolished commercial building constructed in the early 1900s | Iloilo | City of Iloilo | J.M. Basa Street | 10°41′46″N 122°34′11″E | Upload Photo |
| | Villanueva Building | Commercial building | Iloilo | City of Iloilo | J.M. Basa Street cor. Arroyo Street | 10°41′47″N 122°34′10″E | Upload file |
| | Villanueva Building | Commercial building | Iloilo | City of Iloilo | Iznart Street cor. Ledesma Street | 10°41′46″N 122°34′08″E | Upload Photo |
| | S. Villanueva Building | Commercial building | Iloilo | City of Iloilo | Iznart Street cor. Magsaysay Road | 10°41′43″N 122°34′08″E | Upload file |
| | Villanueva Building | Commercial building | Iloilo | City of Iloilo | Iznart Street cor. De Leon Street | 10°41′36″N 122°34′08″E | Upload Photo |
| | Iloilo Central Market | An Art Deco public market built in 1912, and one of the two major public markets in the downtown area | Iloilo | City of Iloilo | Iznart Street cor. Rizal Street | 10°41′33″N 122°34′09″E | Upload file |
| | J. Melliza Building | Commercial building built in 1931 | Iloilo | City of Iloilo | Iznart Street cor. Aldeguer Street | 10°41′37″N 122°34′09″E | Upload Photo |
| | Tayengco Building | Commercial building built in 1950 | Iloilo | City of Iloilo | Iznart Street | 10°41′41″N 122°34′09″E | Upload Photo |
| | L.J. Hormillosa Building | Commercial building built in 1950 | Iloilo | City of Iloilo | Iznart Street | 10°41′42″N 122°34′09″E | Upload file |
| | Celso Ledesma Building | Commercial building | Iloilo | City of Iloilo | Iznart Street | 10°41′43″N 122°34′09″E | Upload file |
| | Cantonese Club Building | Commercial building | Iloilo | City of Iloilo | Aldeguer Street | 10°41′37″N 122°34′10″E | Upload file |

==== Conservation expanded area ====
| Cultural Property wmph identifier | Site name | Description | Province | City or municipality | Address | Coordinates | Image |
|---|---|---|---|---|---|---|---|
| | Iloilo Customs House | Built in 1916, it is one of the three customs houses in the Philippines | Iloilo | City of Iloilo | Muelle Loney Street cor. Aduana Street | 10°41′39″N 122°34′20″E | Upload file |
| | Celso Ledesma Mansion | A declared heritage house owned by Celso Ledesma, also known as the 'Eagle House' | Iloilo | City of Iloilo | Rizal Street cor. Ortiz Street | 10°41′30″N 122°34′17″E | Upload file |
| | Ker & Co. Building | An office and commercial building located behind the Iloilo City Hall | Iloilo | City of Iloilo | Ortiz Street | 10°41′37″N 122°34′22″E | Upload file |
| | The Masonic Temple | Built in 1928 with Greek and Renaissance-inspired designs, it once housed the Iloilo Lodge No. 11 and later served as the Japanese Army headquarters during World War II | Iloilo | City of Iloilo | J.M. Basa Street | 10°41′32″N 122°34′24″E | Upload file |
| | DBP Building | Built in 1961, the DBP Building is being reconstructed to be converted into a multi-level parking building beside the Iloilo City Hall | Iloilo | City of Iloilo | Calasanz Street cor. De La Rama Street | 10°41′37″N 122°34′25″E | Upload Photo |
| | San Jose Parish Church | Considered the first church in the City of Iloilo, built in 1607 | Iloilo | City of Iloilo | Calasanz Street | 10°41′35″N 122°34′27″E | Upload file |

==== Parks and monuments ====
| Cultural Property wmph identifier | Site name | Description | Province | City or municipality | Address | Coordinates | Image |
|---|---|---|---|---|---|---|---|
| | Plaza Libertad | A Spanish-era town square where the flag of the First Philippine Republic was raised in triumph following Spain’s surrender. It is a declared National Historical Landmark | Iloilo | City of Iloilo | J.M. Basa Street, Zamora Street, Calasanz Street, De La Rama Street | 10°41′35″N 122°34′27″E | Upload file |
| | Sunburst Park | A historic park named in honor of the United States Army 40th Infantry ‘Sunburst’ Division | Iloilo | City of Iloilo | J.M. Basa Street cor. Aduana Street | 10°41′38″N 122°34′19″E | Upload file |
| | Plazoleta Gay | A historic intersection with a diagonal pedestrian crossing and mini park | Iloilo | City of Iloilo | J.M. Basa Street, Iznart Street, Ledesma Street, Arroyo Street | 10°41′47″N 122°34′09″E | Upload file |
| | Maria Clara Monument | A statue of Maria Clara | Iloilo | City of Iloilo | Rizal Street | 10°41′31″N 122°34′09″E | Upload file |

== See also ==
- Calle Real, Iloilo
- Iloilo City Proper
- Iloilo Business Park
