= Iloilo Central Market =

Public market in the Philippines

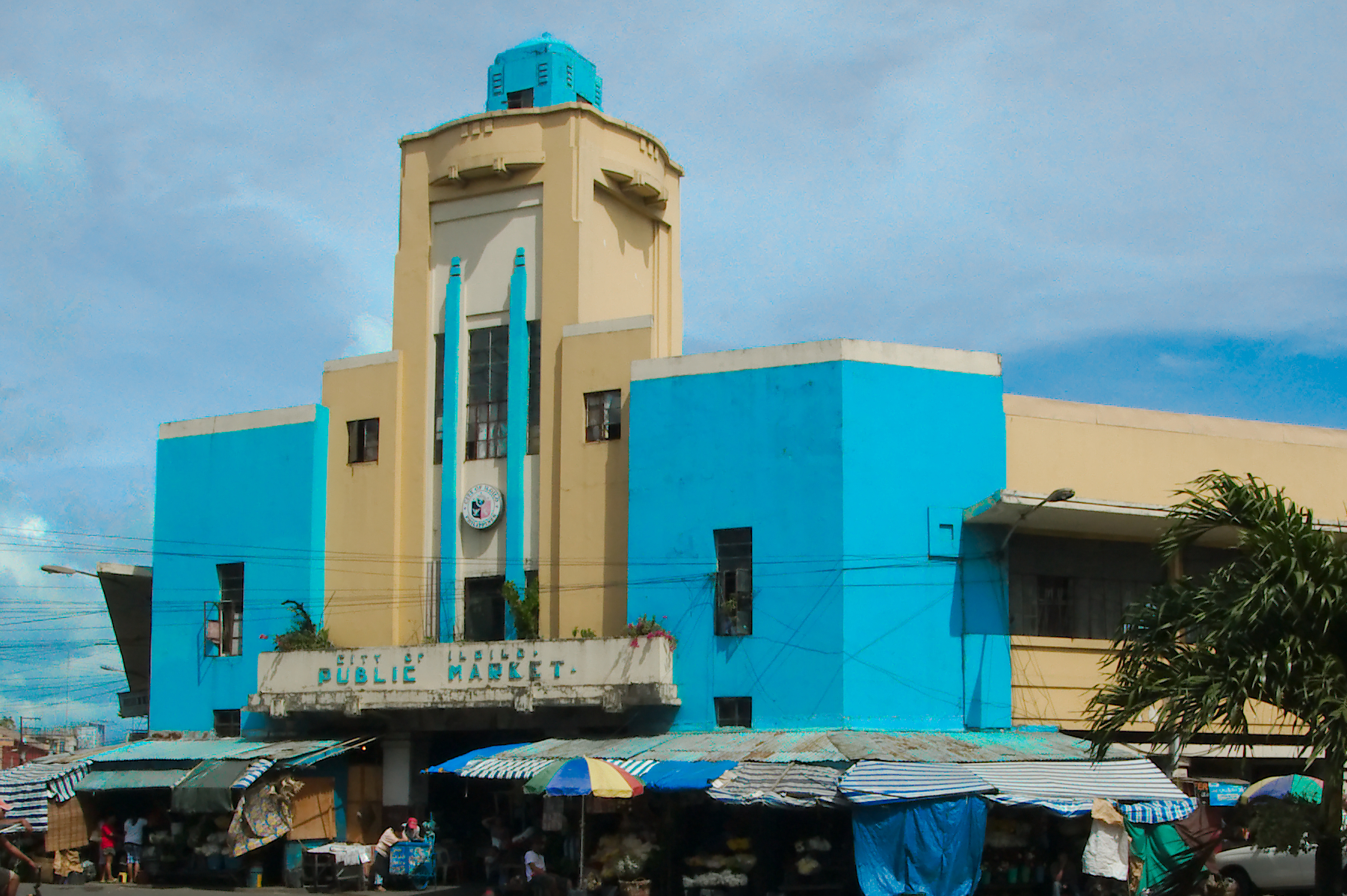
- The art deco façade of the market before the redevelopment
- Location: Iznart Street cor. Rizal Street, Iloilo City Proper; Iloilo City, Philippines; 10.692877°N 122.569451°E
- Opening date: January 15, 1912
- Developer: SM Prime Holdings, Inc. (since 2022)
- Owner: Iloilo City government
- Interactive map of Iloilo Central Market

Iloilo Central Public Market, also known as Central Market or Tienda Mayor, is a public market located in Iloilo City, Philippines. It is one of the two largest public markets (palengkes) in the Iloilo City Proper district, the other being the Iloilo Terminal Market, (commonly referred to as "Super"). Opened in 1912, it is considered one of the oldest public markets in the Philippines and is noted for its Art Deco façade.

In 2022, along with the Iloilo Terminal Market, it underwent redevelopment through a public-private partnership (PPP) between the Iloilo City Government and SM Prime Holdings, Inc. (SMPHI). The market was officially reopened in late 2025. The redevelopment, aside from the public market itself, also features a mall wing known as SM at Iloilo Central Market.

== History ==
The Iloilo Central Market was officially opened to the public on January 15, 1912. Its Art Deco façade was later added in 1938. The market underwent its first major renovation during the term of Acting Mayor Rosa Caram from 1986 to 1987.

Located within the Calle Real Heritage Zone in downtown Iloilo City, the market is surrounded by several heritage structures dating back to the Spanish and American colonial periods. In 2013, the area was declared a Cultural Tourism Heritage Zone, and in 2014, it was recognized as a Historic Center through National Historical Commission of the Philippines (NHCP) Resolution No. 3.

=== Redevelopment ===
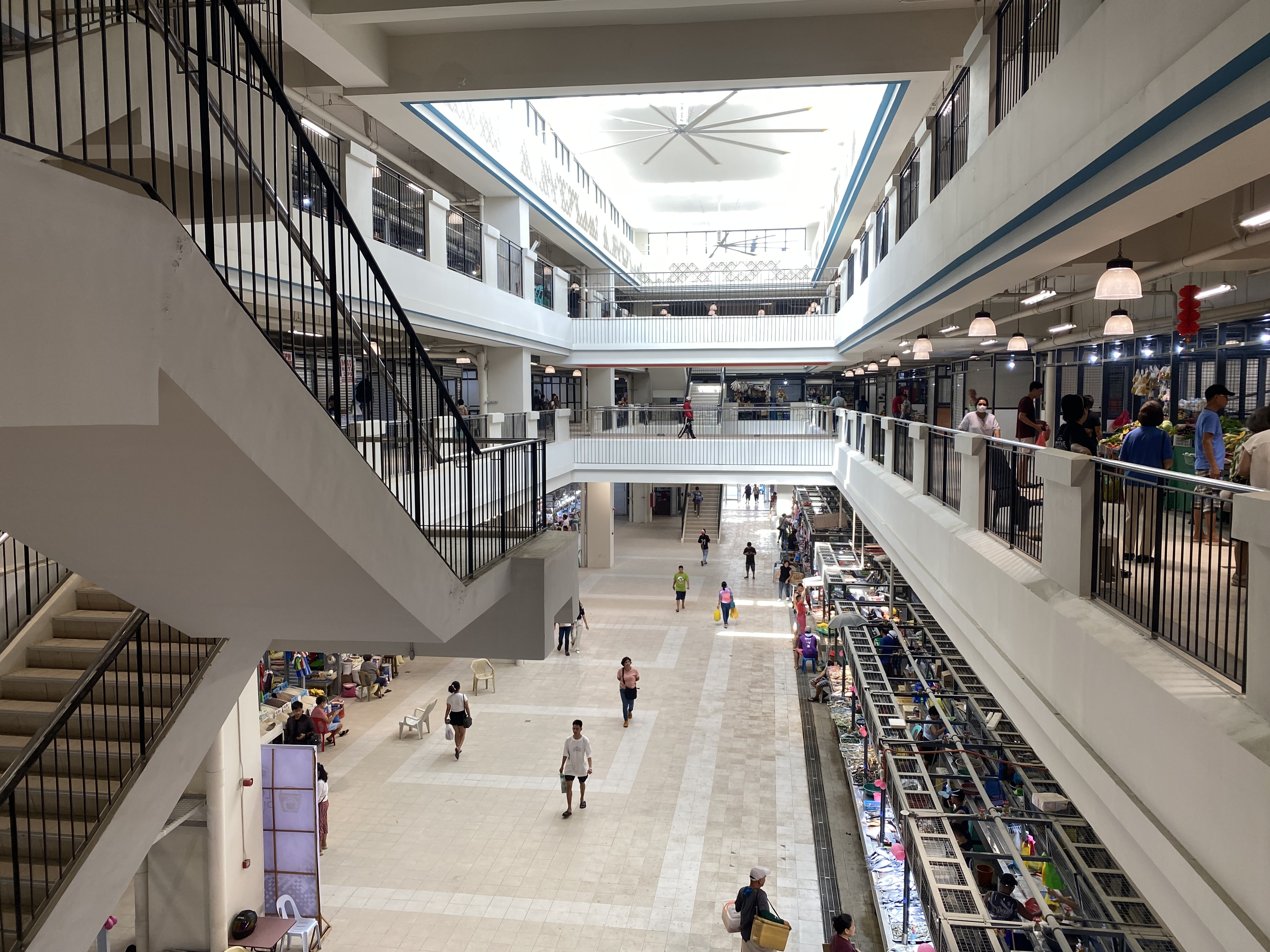
Interior, post-redevelopment

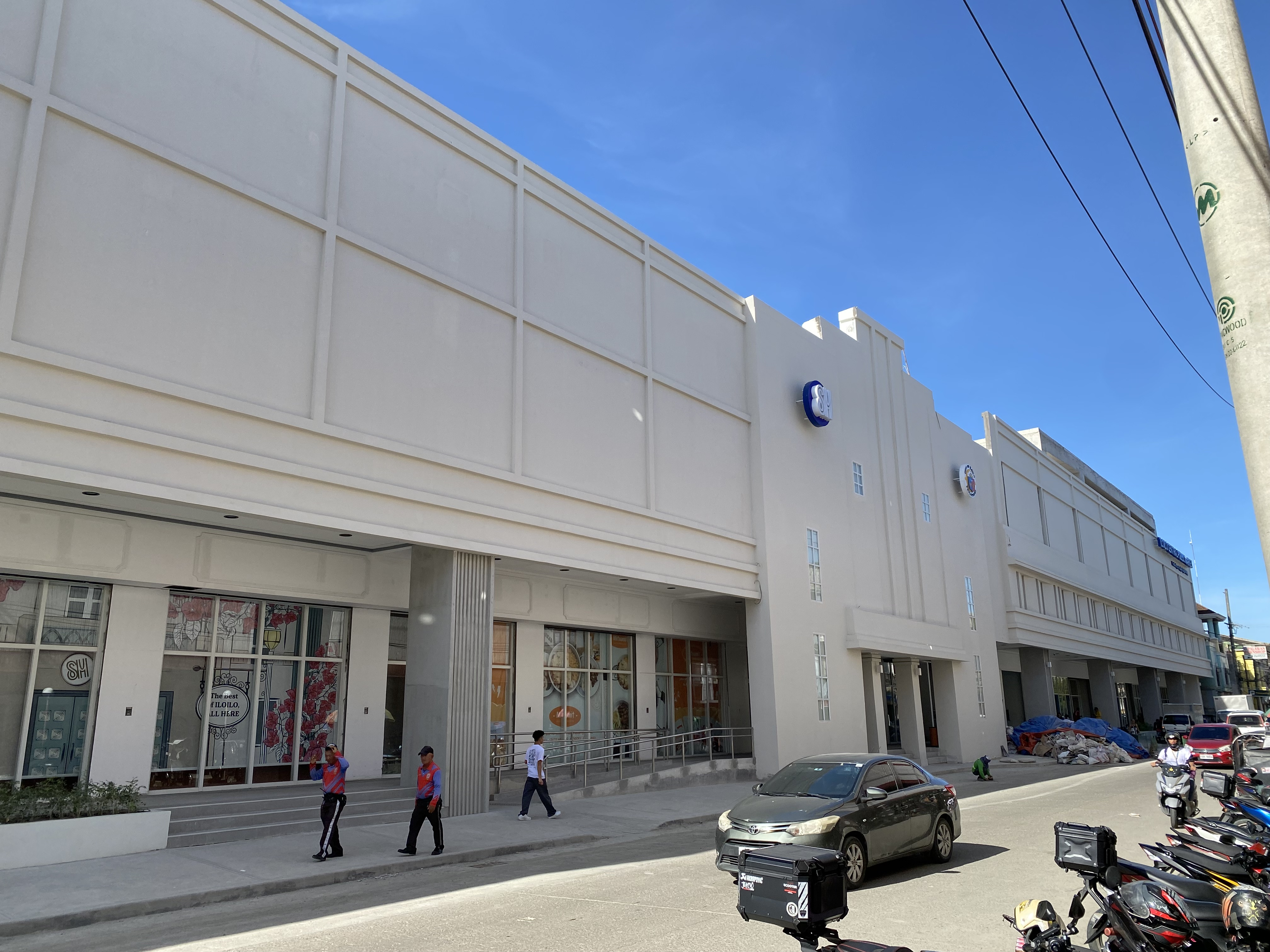
Exterior, post-redevelopment

On August 3, 2022, SM Prime Holdings, Inc. (SMPHI) was awarded a 25-year lease agreement for the market’s redevelopment under a public–private partnership with the Iloilo City Government. During the rehabilitation period, market vendors were temporarily relocated to several streets surrounding the market to continue their operations. In March 2024, the market’s Art Deco façade was demolished to allow for a structural reinforcement and a pledged faithful reconstruction of the original design by SMPHI. The move, however, drew public concern over the city government’s approval process. Mayor Jerry Treñas later faced administrative complaints related to the alleged unlawful demolition, filed by Jose Nereo Lujan, chief information officer of the Iloilo Provincial Information and Community Affairs Office (PICAO), with the Office of the Ombudsman–Visayas in Iloilo City.

In late 2025, the market was officially reopened. The redevelopment maintained the market’s heritage architecture, both exterior and interior, and features two wings: the public market, operated by the local government, and the mall and retail wing, managed by SM Retail. The public market features a modernized wet and dry market, with the number of vendors increased to 850 from the previous 603. The mall wing features a curated mix of shops, food stalls, local brands, and service establishments. The public market section reopened on October 30, while the mall section opened on November 28.

Following its reopening, the city government officially structured its localized market day under the Bolante Day system. For the Central Market, this designated "Lunesan" (Monday Market) schedule permits transient vendors to operate from Monday at 6:00 PM through Tuesday at 5:00 AM.

== See also ==
- La Paz Public Market
