= Our Lady of the Most Holy Rosary of Iloilo =

Canonically crowned image in Iloilo City

Our Lady of the Most Holy Rosary of Iloilo Nuestra Señora Virgen del Santisimo Rosario de Iloilo
- The image venerated in San Jose Church
- Location: Iloilo City Proper, Philippines
- Date: 1616
- Witness: Don Diego Quiñones
- Approval: Julio Cardinal Rosales
- Venerated in: Catholic Church
- Shrine: San Jose Parish Church
- Patronage: Iloilo City
- Feast day: October 7

Our Lady of the Most Holy Rosary of Iloilo (Spanish: Nuestra Señora Virgen del Santisimo Rosario de Iloilo) is a Roman Catholic image of the Blessed Virgin Mary venerated in San Jose Church in Iloilo City Proper, Iloilo City, Philippines.

== History ==
On September 30, 1616, during a battle against a Dutch force, the statue was discovered by Don Diego Quiñones at Fuerte San Pedro (Fort San Pedro). The event coincided with the defenders’ eventual victory after three days of fighting.

Two Augustinian priests, Father Jeronimo de Arevalo and Father Juan de Morales, supported the soldiers during the battle. After the conflict, they organized a procession to carry the statue into the chapel within the fortress. The statue was later proclaimed the Patroness and Mediatrix of Iloilo. Over the past three centuries, devotion to the statue grew, and many people from Panay and Negros began to visit and pay homage to the Our Lady of the Most Holy Rosary.

The statue was enthroned in San Jose Church. In 1970, a replica was erected at Fort San Pedro where it was found. The original statue was episcopally crowned on October 11, 1970, by His Eminence, Julio Cardinal Rosales.

== See also ==
- San Jose Church (Iloilo)
