= Iznart Street =

Street in Iloilo City, Philippines

- Fermin Caram Avenue; Ruperto Montinola Street
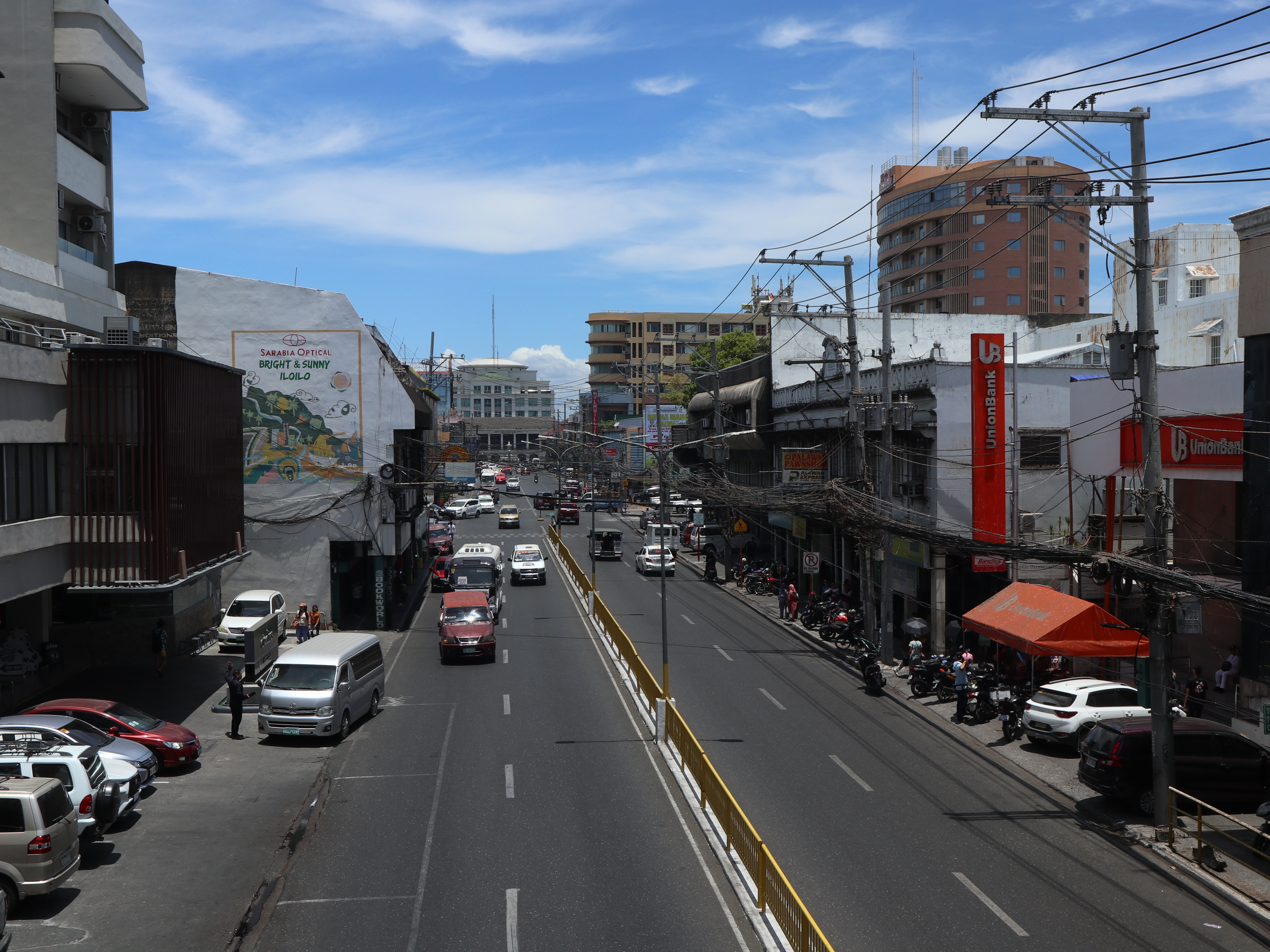
- Iznart Street looking towards Iloilo Provincial Capitol
- Former name: Calle Iznart
- Namesake: Manuel Iznart; Fermin Caram Sr. Ruperto Montinola
- Length: 1.16 km (0.72 mi)
- Location: Iloilo City, Philippines
- North end: General Luna Street
- Major junctions: Solis Street; Yulo/Delgado Street; Ledesma Street; N532 (J.M. Basa Street); Arroyo Street; De Leon Street; Aldeguer Street; Rizal Street
- South end: Blanco Street

Iznart Street, officially known in parts as Fermin Caram Avenue (Note: Fermin Caram Avenue refers to the portion of Iznart Street from General Luna Street to Plazoleta Gay) and Ruperto Montinola Street, (Note: Ruperto Montinola Street refers to the portion of Iznart Street from Plazoleta Gay to Blanco Street) is a major commercial thoroughfare in downtown Iloilo City, Philippines. It runs north–south through the district's center, stretching from the Casa Real de Iloilo to Iloilo Chinatown and extending to the Iloilo Central Market.

During the Spanish colonial era, the street was known as Calle Iznart, named after Manuel Iznart, who served as the mayor of Iloilo in the late 1860s. It was one of the city's key commercial and educational hubs. In the late 19th century and early 20th century, during the early years of American colonial period, Iznart Street served as an extension of Calle Real, running from Plazoleta Gay to the Arroyo Fountain in Iloilo Provincial Capitol.

In 1971, an ordinance was passed renaming certain streets in Iloilo City, including Iznart Street, which was divided into two sections. The northern portion, stretching from Plazoleta Gay to General Luna Street, was renamed in honor of Ruperto Montinola, a former senator and governor of Iloilo. Meanwhile, the southern section, from Plazoleta Gay to Blanco Street, was renamed after Dr. Fermin Caram Sr., a Lebanese physician known for his pivotal role in Iloilo during the cholera epidemic, his contributions to the Philippine Constitution, and his service during the Japanese occupation. Despite the official name changes, the street continues to be widely known and referred to by locals as Iznart Street.

The southern portion of Iznart Street is located within the Calle Real Heritage Zone.

== Landmarks ==
Some of the prominent landmarks along Iznart Street are:

- Arroyo Fountain
- YMCA Building
- Cabalum Western College
- Citadines Amigo Iloilo
- Three defunct movie houses:
  - Cinema
  - Alegro 1
  - Alegro 2
- Unitop Iloilo
- Iloilo Central Commercial High School
- Hua Siong College of Iloilo
- Plazoleta Gay
- Terranza Residences
- Filipino-Chinese Friendship Arch
- Locsin-Coscuella Building, a heritage building built in 1920.
- Iloilo Grand Hotel
- Iloilo Central Market
- University of Iloilo
- Maria Clara Monument
