= Ledesma Mansion =

Heritage house in Iloilo City, Philippines

Coordinates: 10°43′23″N 122°33′27″E

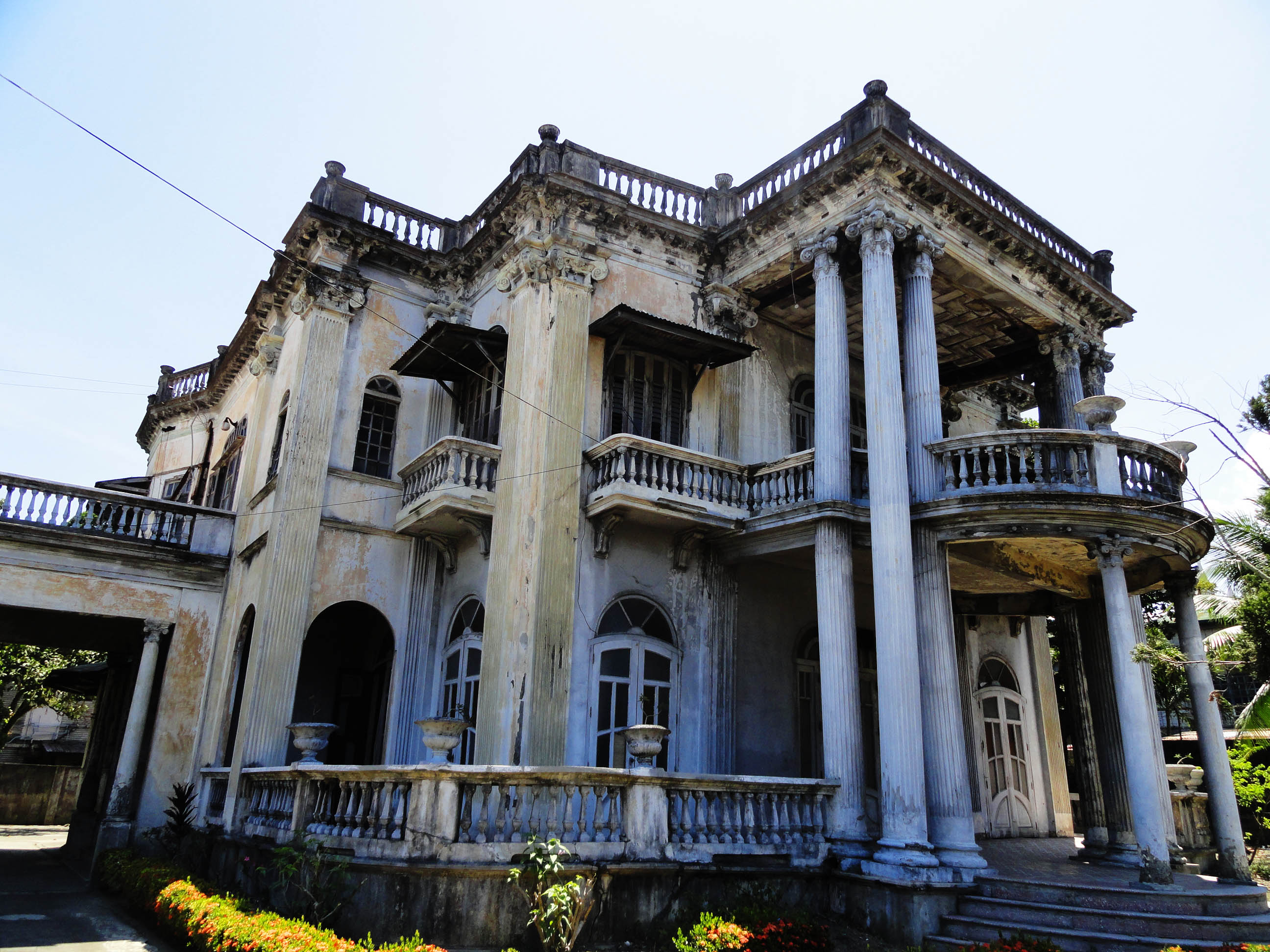
- Interactive map of the Ledesma Mansion area

General information
- Architectural style: Beaux-Arts
- Location: Jaro, Iloilo City, Philippines
- Completed: 1928

The Ledesma Mansion, also known as Don Joaquin Ledesma Ancestral House, is a heritage house located in Jaro, Iloilo City, Philippines. Built in 1928, it was the residence of sugar baron Don Joaquin Ledesma and his wife, Doña Pilar Ledesma.

The mansion is currently abandoned and some efforts to preserve and restore it have been discussed by heritage conservation groups, but no concrete plans have been implemented as of yet.

The mansion is situated prominently in front of the Jaro Plaza.

== See also ==
- Celso Ledesma House
