= Old Iloilo City Hall =

Historic building in Iloilo City, Philippines

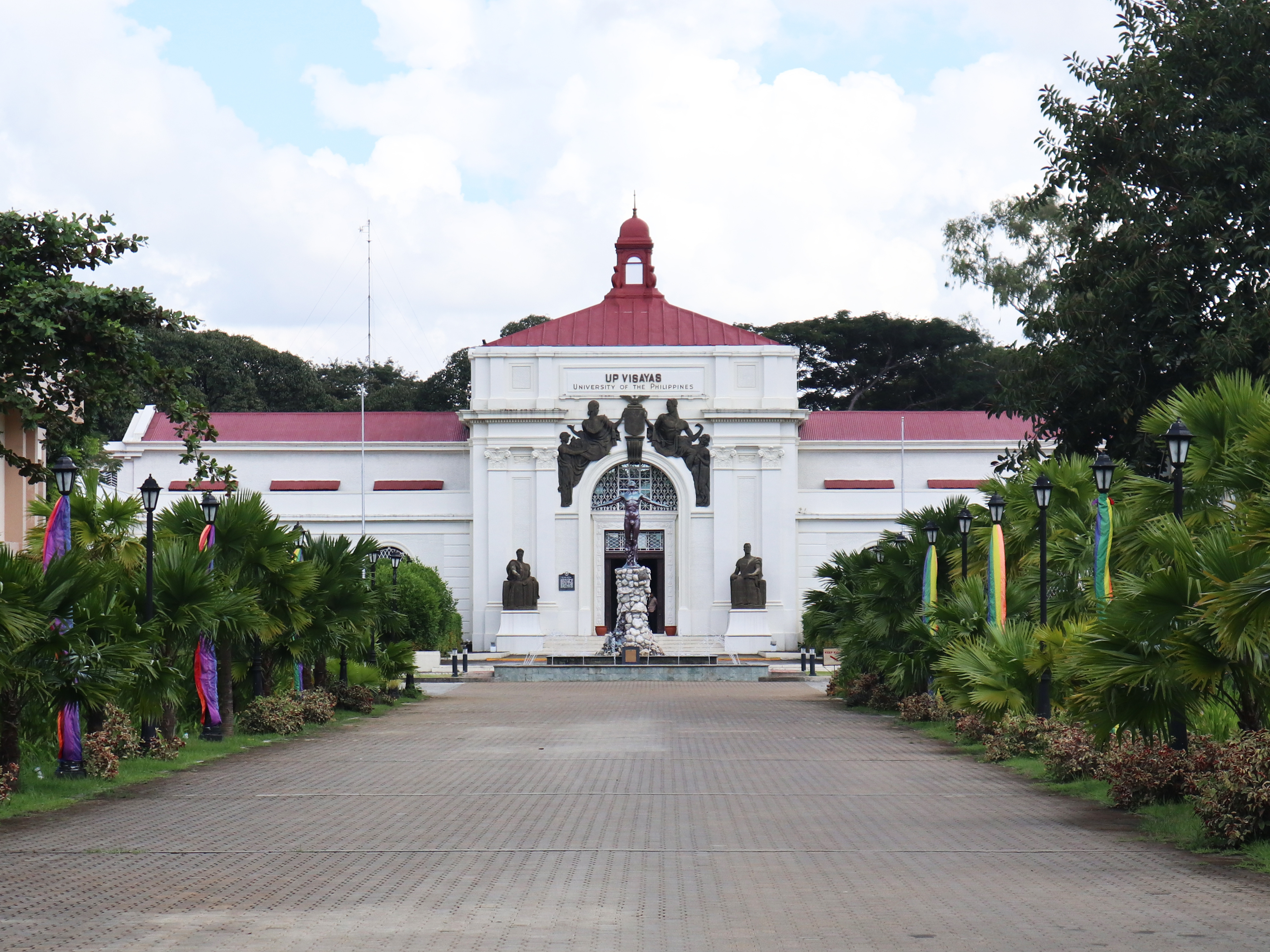
- Alternative names: University of the Philippines Visayas Main Building

General information
- Status: Completed
- Architectural style: Neoclassical
- Location: University of the Philippines Visayas - Iloilo City Campus, General Luna cor. Infante St., Iloilo City, Philippines
- Coordinates: 10°41′53″N 122°33′19″E
- Construction started: February 1931
- Completed: 1935
- Inaugurated: December 1936
- Renovated: 1950, 2019

Design and construction
- Architect: Juan Arellano
- Other designers: Francesco Riccardo Monti (sculptor)

National Historical Landmarks
- Official name: Old Iloilo City Hall
- Designated: 2008

The University of the Philippines Visayas Main Building, also sometimes referred to as the Old Iloilo City Hall, is a historic building in Iloilo City which currently serves as the primary building of the Iloilo City campus of the University of the Philippines (UP) Visayas. It was previously used as the official seat of government of the City of Iloilo.

== History ==
Construction of the building began in February 1931 and it was used to host the Iloilo City Hall as early as 1935. It was inaugurated in December 1936. The building stands in a 10,000 m^{2} (110,000 sq ft) lot which was donated to the local government of Iloilo City. During the Japanese occupation of the Philippines during World War II, Japanese soldiers occupied the building in 1942 and made it their garrison. The Japanese occupied the building until 1945.

In 1945, while the war was still ongoing Iloilo City Council passed Resolution No. 485 which concerns the establishment of a junior college for the University of the Philippines Iloilo. The city council approved Resolution No. 461 after the war, donating the old city hall to the UP Iloilo College which opened in July 1947. It was transferred to the educational institute under the administration of then-Iloilo City Mayor Fernando Lopez and it was repaired in 1950 through the efforts of the Philippine War Damage Commission.

In the 2010s, the building underwent a renovation after the National Historical Commission of the Philippines provided a grant of ₱54 million in 2017 following the lobbying of Senator Franklin Drilon and Antique Representative Loren Legarda. The building was reopened to the public on August 16, 2019.

== Architecture and design ==
Aerial view of the Old Iloilo City Hall and its surroundings

Filipino architect Juan Arellano designed the UP Visayas Main Building for ₱90,000. The building was made in the neo-classical design. The law and order bronze male statues present in the building's facade was made by Italian sculptor Francesco Riccardo Monti. The building's main features are the Court Room and the Session Hall, the latter of which is also known as the Lozano Hall.

== Tenants ==
The building briefly served as the Iloilo City Hall and later a garrison of soldiers of Imperial Japan during the World War II era. As of 2019, the building hosts the office of the Center for West Visayan Studies as well as an art gallery.

== Gallery ==
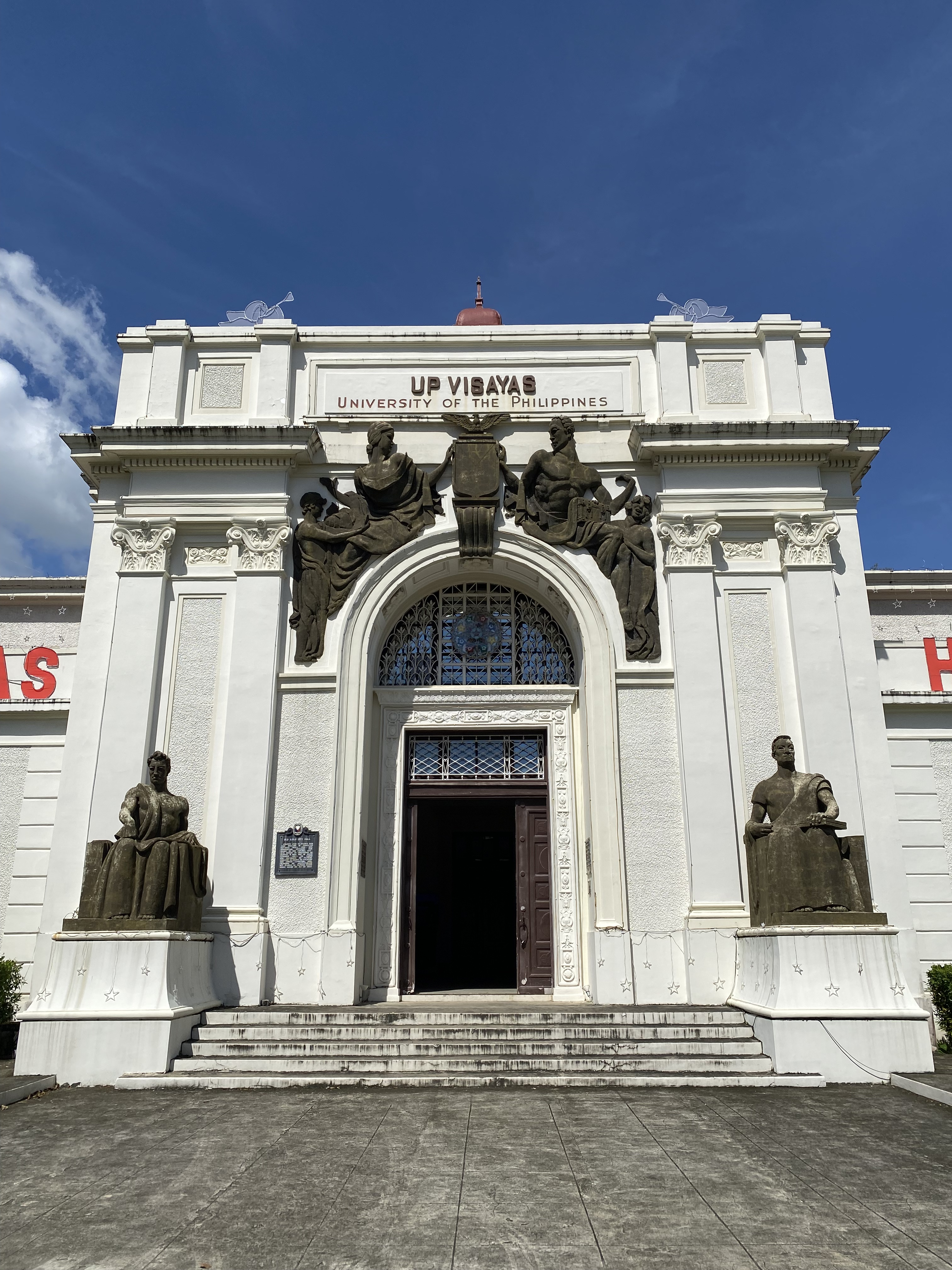
Façade

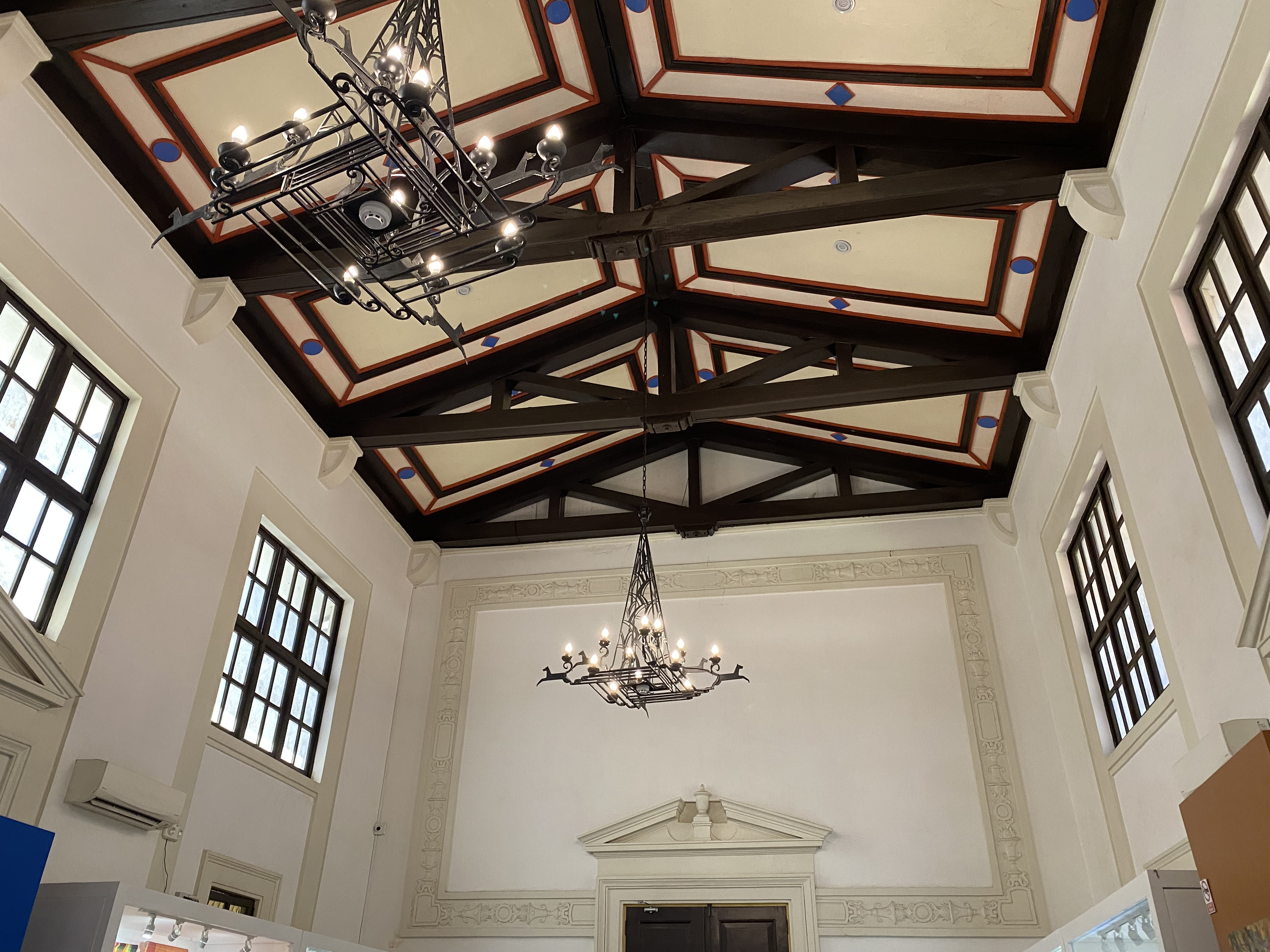
Lozano Hall with its original chandeliers

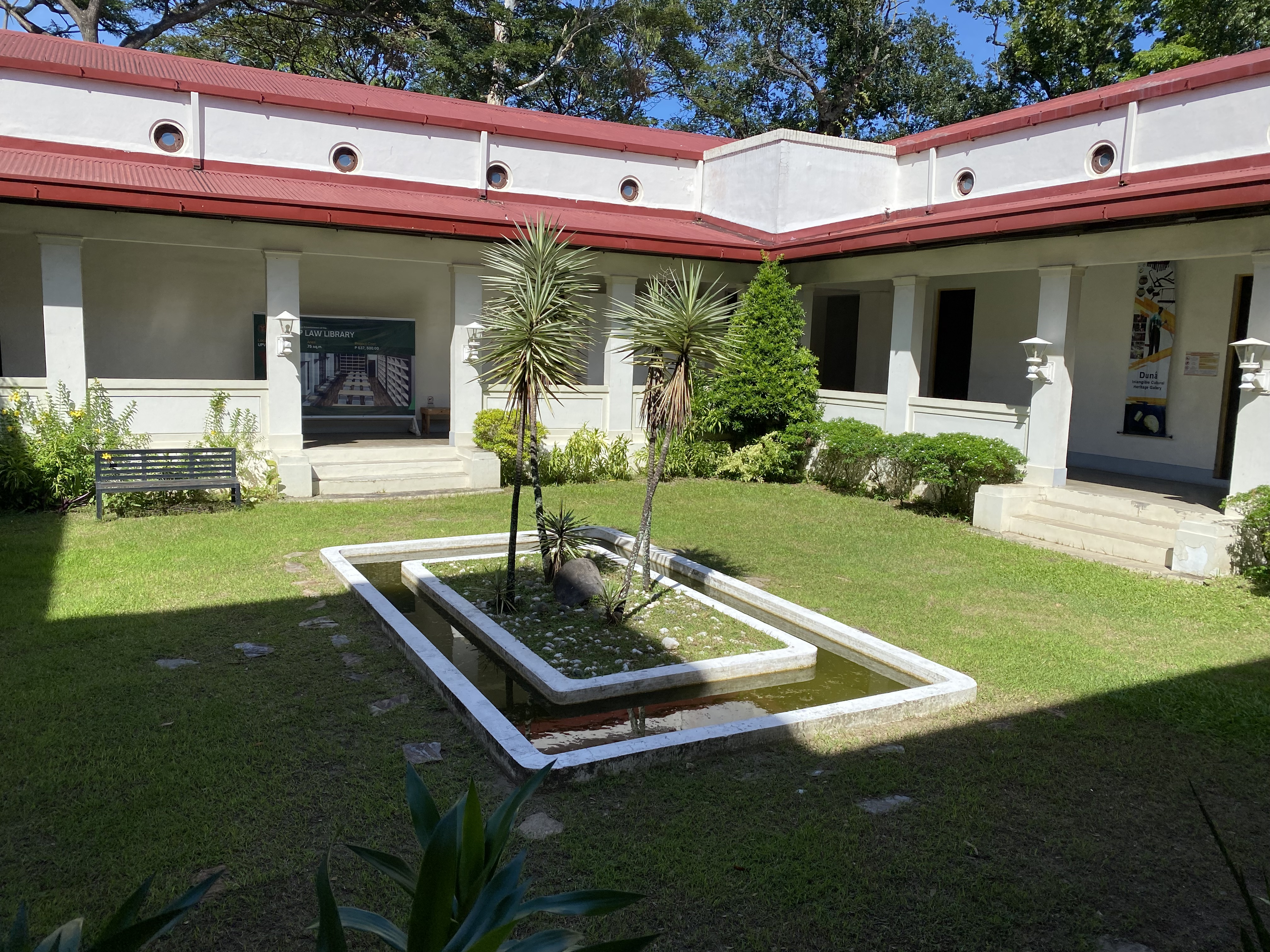
Courtyard within the building

Oblation sculpture in front of the old city hall

== See also ==
- Iloilo City Hall
- Philippines National Historical Landmarks
