= Celso Ledesma House =

Heritage house in Iloilo City, Philippines

Coordinates: 10°41′30″N 122°34′17″E

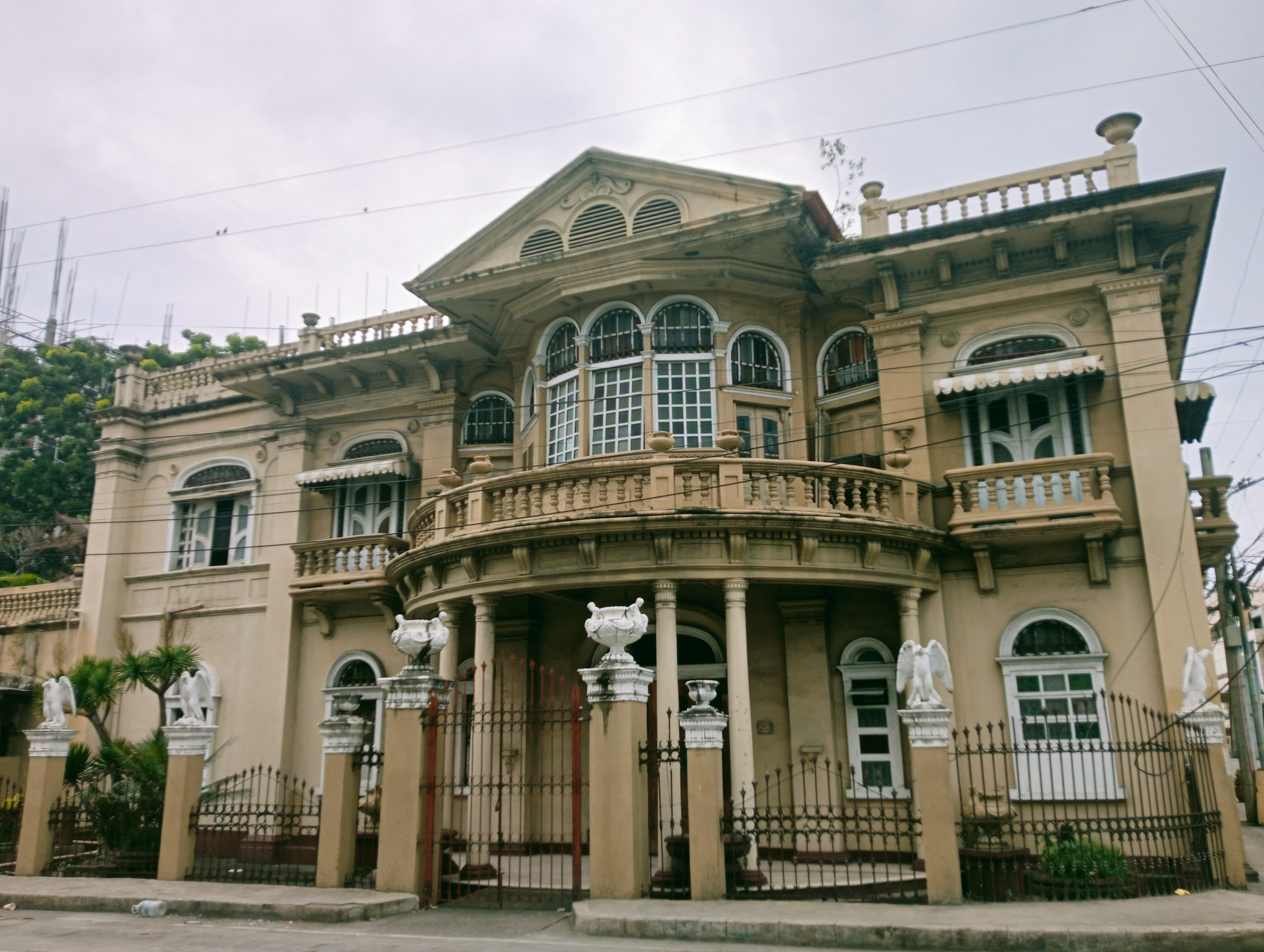
- Interactive map of the Celso Ledesma House area

General information
- Architectural style: Beaux-Arts
- Location: Ortiz Street, Iloilo City Proper, Iloilo City, Philippines
- Completed: 1922

The Celso Ledesma House, or Celso Ledesma Mansion, also known as Eagle House, is a heritage house located in Iloilo City, Philippines. Situated within the Calle Real Heritage Zone in Iloilo City Proper, the house was built in 1922 by engineers Mariano Cacho and Mariano Salas for Don Celso Ledesma. During World War II, the Japanese imperial forces earmarked the house for an important official. However, as the official never arrived in Iloilo, the house and all its furniture were spared from requisition or damage.

Don Celso Ledesma later bequeathed the house to his nephew, Tomas Simeon Zafiro Ledesma. The Ledesma family has continued to maintain the property. Don Zafiro Ledesma served as mayor of Iloilo City.

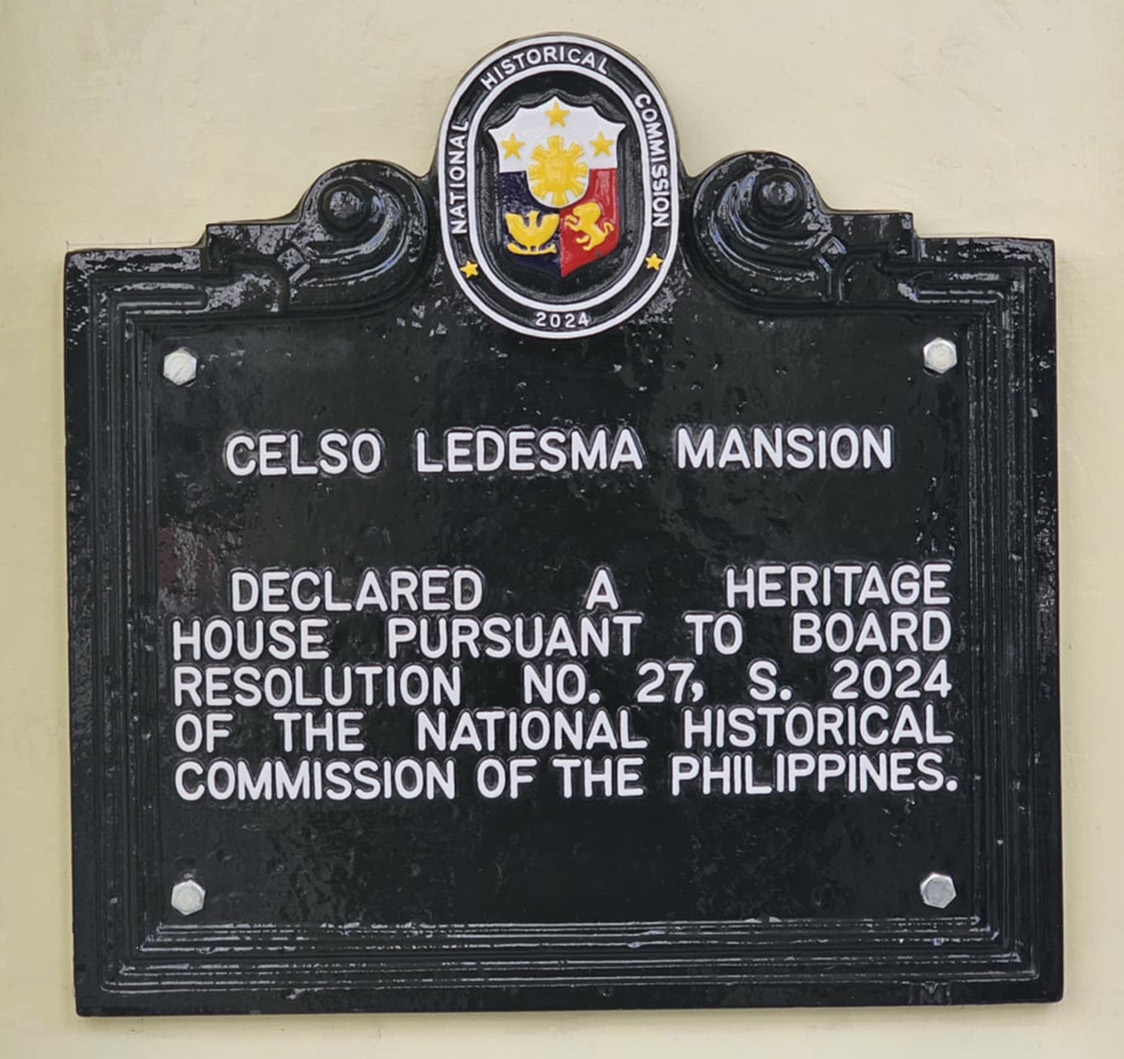
National historical marker stating that the building was declared a Heritage House in 2024

In 2024, the house was declared a Heritage House by the National Historical Commission of the Philippines, and a historical marker commemorating the designation was unveiled by Commission staff, members of the Ledesma family, and Iloilo City Mayor Jerry Treñas.

== See also ==
- Ledesma Mansion
