= Fort San Pedro (Iloilo) =

Fort in Iloilo City, Philippines

Coordinates: 10°41′17″N 122°34′48″E

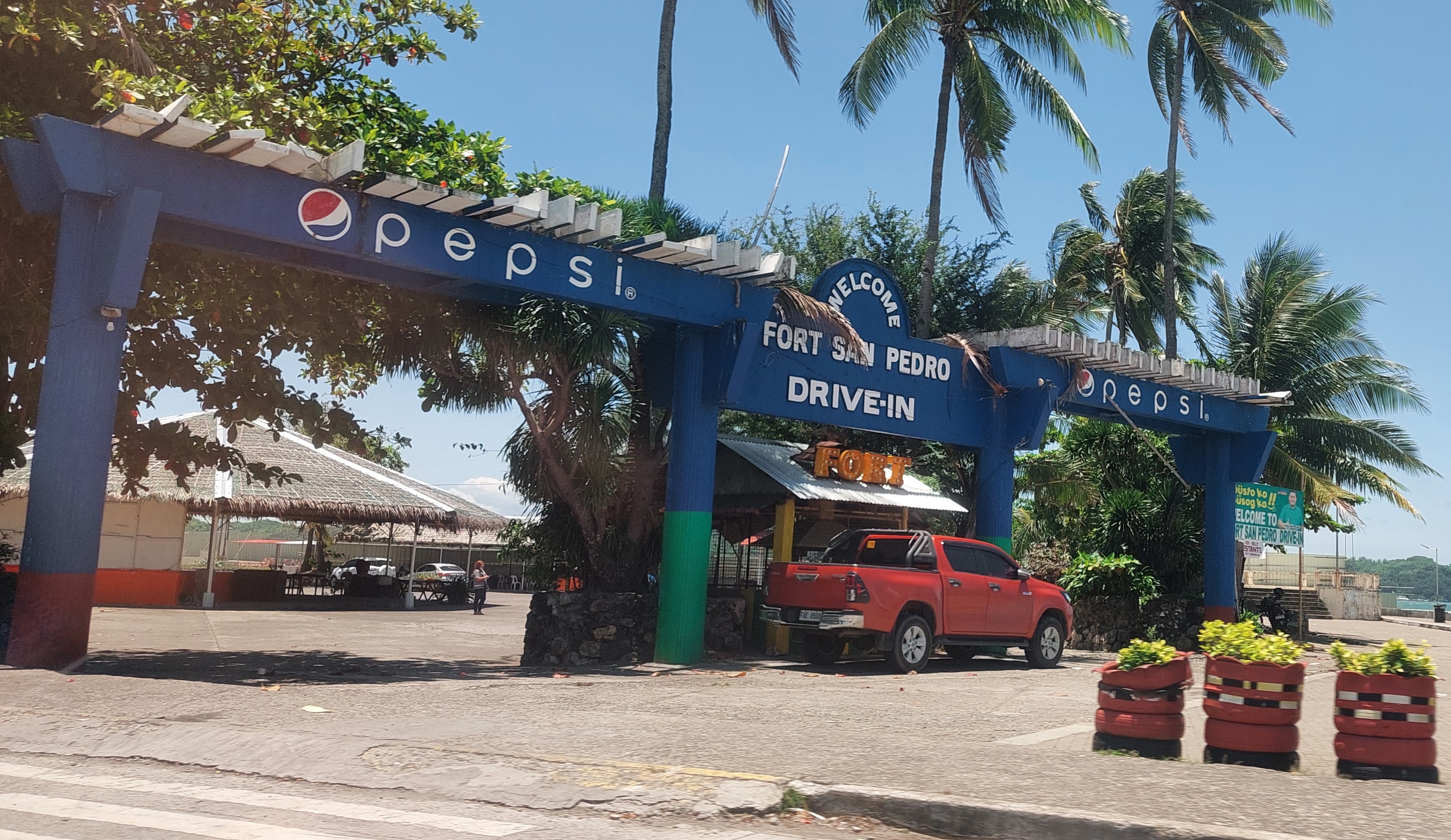
Fort San Pedro in present-day.

Fort San Pedro, also called Fuerza de la Nuestra Señora del Rosario, was a military defense structure in Iloilo City, Philippines. It was built in 1602 by Pedro Bravo de Acuña to protect the city from Moro and Dutch attacks, and was completely destroyed during World War II.

It was declared an important cultural property in 2016 by the National Museum of the Philippines (NMP) and is the second Spanish-built fort in the Philippines and Asia, following the one in Cebu (also named Fort San Pedro).

== History ==
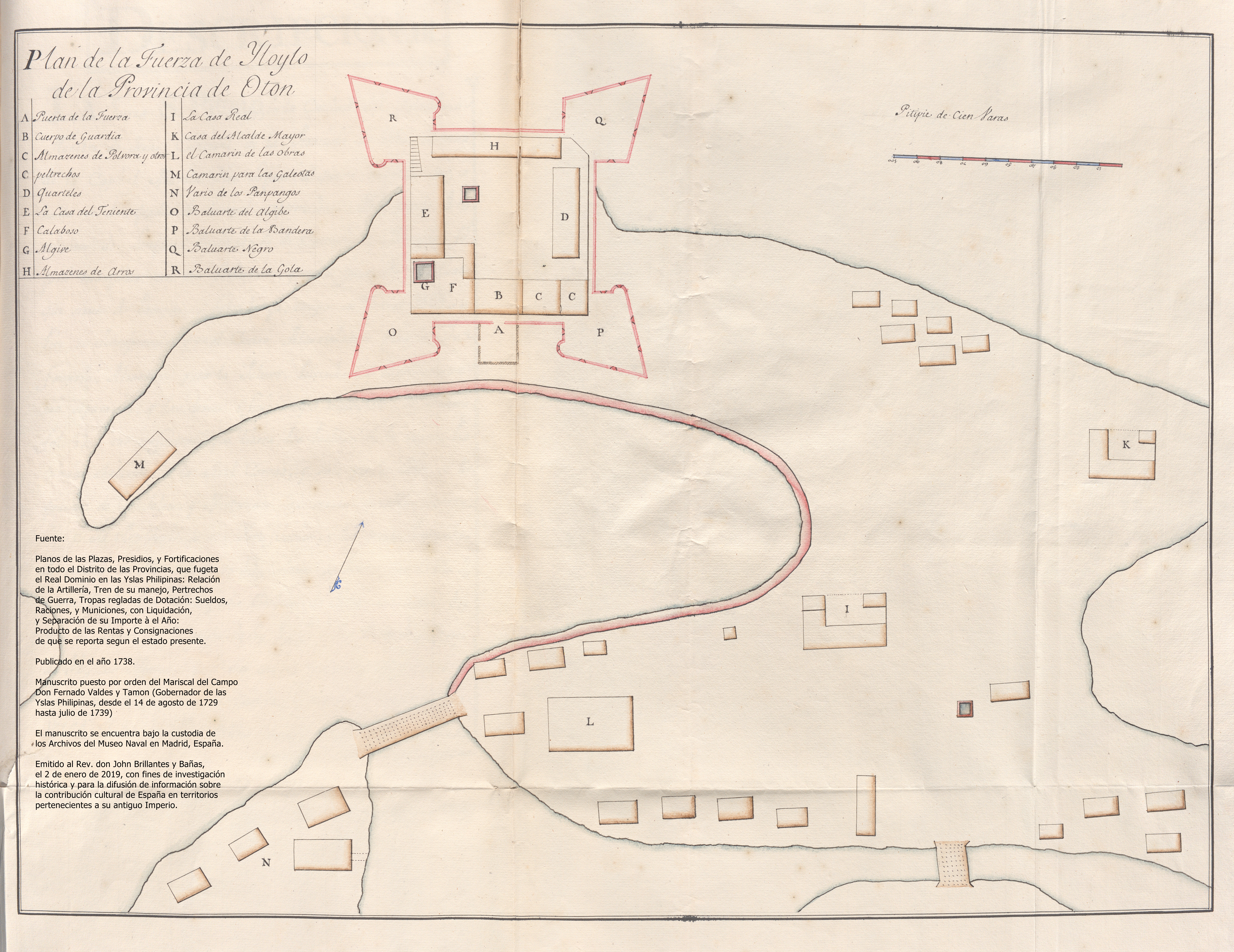
The Plan of the Fortification of the City of Iloilo, circa 1738.

Prior to the founding of the fort, records show the presence of wooden defense installations in Arevalo, Iloilo as early as 1599. A Spanish captain Joan Garcia de Sierra successfully defended a wooden fort at Arevalo against attacks from Mindanao tribes. While he himself was killed in the battle.

The current Fort San Pedro, formerly called Fortificación de Nuestra Señora del Rosario en el Puerto de Yloylo, Provincia de Oton (lit. transl. Fortification of Our Lady of the Rosary in the Port of Yloylo, Province of Oton), was first built out of wood in 1602 by Pedro Bravo de Acuña. It was renovated into a stone fort by Diego de Quiñones following the Dutch attack in 1616, where he found the image of Our Lady of the Most Holy Rosary, now enshrined at San Jose Church.

On October 10, 1903, U.S. President Theodore Roosevelt declared it and its adjoining areas as a military reservation. In 1936, Philippine President Manuel L. Quezon designated the fort as a Philippine Army Post. When World War II erupted, the Japanese Imperial army seized control and made it into a headquarters. In March 1945, combined forces from the United States Navy and Air Force bombed all Japanese installations in Iloilo and pulverized Fort San Pedro. As a ruin, it later served as a park for recreation, outdoor dining, and drinking.

Since 2015, several proposals have been made to reconstruct Fort San Pedro. In 2016, the National Museum of the Philippines (NMP) declared the site an important cultural property and a component of a cultural heritage tourism zone in Iloilo City. In October 2024, the NMP signed an agreement to restore and develop Fort San Pedro, with work scheduled to begin in 2025. There is also a proposal to transfer roll-on/roll-off (Ro-Ro) operations from both Dumangas and Lapuz to Fort San Pedro, along with plans to expand the area by adding more ramps to accommodate ro-ro vessels.

== See also ==
- Fort San Pedro
