= Plazoleta Gay =

Public plaza in the Philippines

Plazoleta Gáy
- Socorro
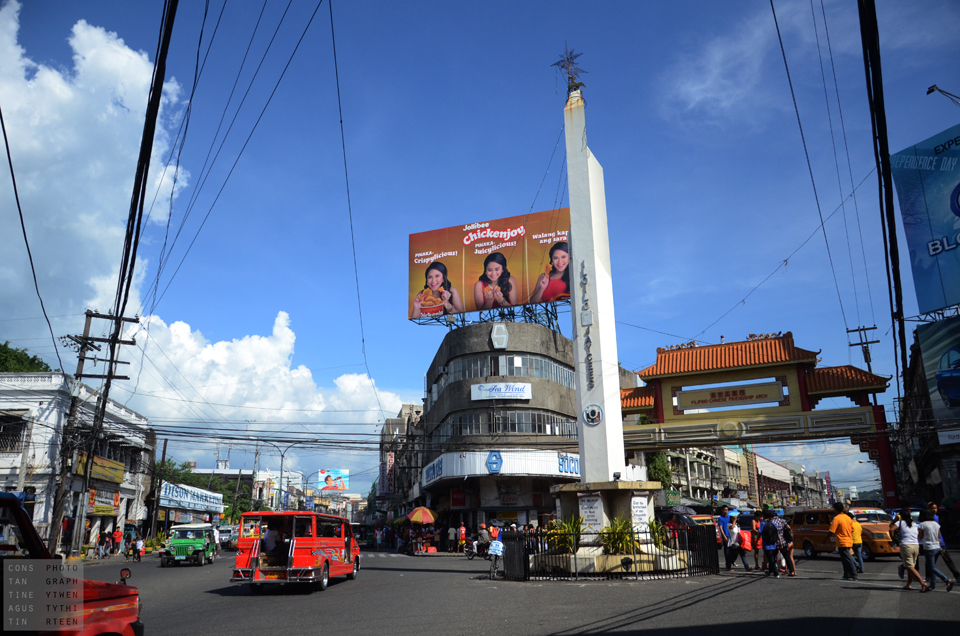
- The plazoleta before the redevelopment
- Interactive map of Plazoleta Gáy
- Type: Town square
- Location: Iloilo City, Philippines
- Coordinates: 10°41′47.1372″N 122°34′8.5188″E
- Etymology: José María N. Gáy

Plazoleta Gáy, formerly referred to as Plaza Gáy, is a small plaza in the middle of the downtown area of Iloilo City, Philippines. Located at the intersection of J.M. Basa, Ledesma, Iznart, and Arroyo streets, it serves as a pedestrian-oriented public space within the city's historic commercial district. It is also commonly referred to locally as Socorro, a name associated with the former Socorro Drugstore, a longstanding commercial establishment located directly across from the plaza. Established in the 1940s, the drugstore became a familiar landmark in the area. Although it closed in July 2025, the name "Socorro" continues to be used locally to identify the surrounding area.

The plazoleta (a diminutive of plaza) is named after José María N. Gáy, the last Spanish mayor of Iloilo and its first mayor under American colonial period. Its central feature is a white commemorative obelisk topped with a dove. The area underwent redevelopment in 2025, including improvements to its paved surfaces and public-space facilities.

Historically, Plazoleta Gáy was a busy road junction and pedestrian crossing in downtown Iloilo. It is also associated with political demonstrations and civic gatherings, including events during the People Power Revolution in 1986.

== Redevelopment ==
Plazoleta Gáy underwent rehabilitation as part of a road and drainage improvement project implemented by the Department of Public Works and Highways (DPWH). The project, which covered portions of J.M. Basa and Iznart streets, included the rehabilitation of the plazoleta, drainage improvements, curb installation, and pavement markings.

The redevelopment in 2025 improved the site's physical environment, incorporating paved areas and a small landscaped public space around its commemorative monument.
