= Iloilo City Hall =

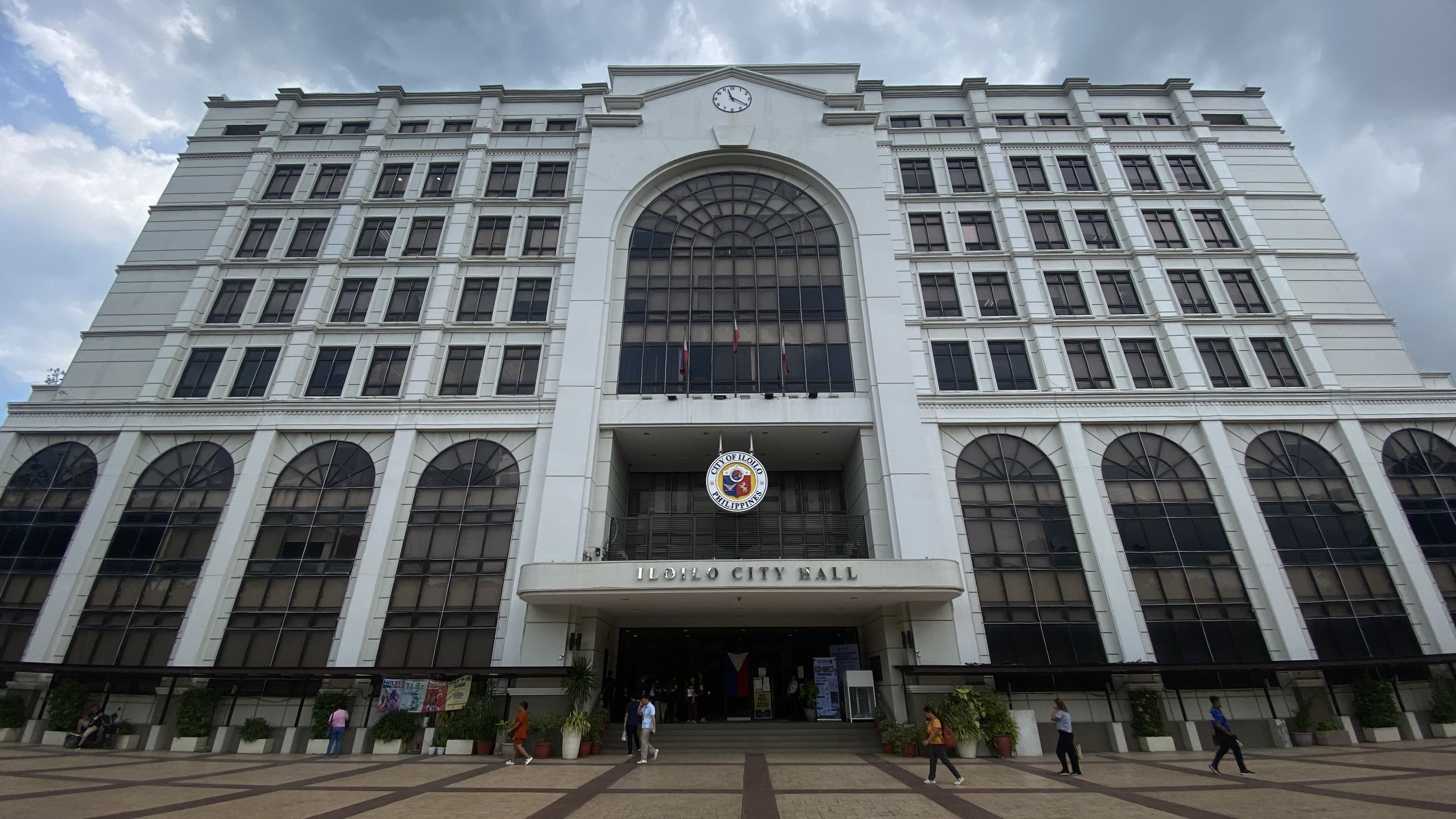
- Iloilo City Hall in 2026
- Interactive map of the Iloilo City Hall area

General information
- Status: Completed
- Type: City Government building
- Architectural style: Neoclassical / Art Deco
- Location: De la Rama Street, Plaza Libertad, Iloilo City Proper, Iloilo City, Philippines
- Coordinates: 10°41′36″N 122°34′24″E
- Completed: August 2011
- Owner: City of Iloilo
- Operator: City of Iloilo

Technical details
- Floor count: 8
- Lifts/elevators: 3

Design and construction
- Developer: City of Iloilo

The Iloilo City Hall is the official seat of government of the City of Iloilo, Philippines, located at Plaza Libertad, within the historic old downtown area in the City Proper district. It is where the Mayor of Iloilo City holds office and the chambers of the Iloilo City Council. It also hosts several offices under the Iloilo City Government. It replaced the old city hall, which now serves as the main building of the University of the Philippines Visayas (UPV) – Iloilo City Campus, in 2011.

Upon its opening, it was recognized as the first green building in the Visayas, featuring solar panels that reduced costs and carbon emissions, a landscaped roof deck with green plants, and an operational rainwater harvesting and recycling system.

== History ==
The city hall was originally located at the corner of General Luna Street and Infante Street, beside the University of the Philippines Visayas. It was donated to the university in 1947 and now serves as the UP Visayas Iloilo City Campus Main Building. Following this, the City of Iloilo temporarily housed its government offices at Casa Real de Iloilo, which was also used by the provincial government. In 2011, the new city hall at Plaza Libertad was completed, becoming the first green building in the Visayas. It features several eco-friendly innovations, including a solar-powered air-conditioning system, a rooftop garden, and a rainwater harvesting area.

In 2024, the eight-story Iloilo City Legislative Building was completed behind the city hall to accommodate city councilors and provide additional office space. It is connected to the city hall via a bridge. The original design of the Iloilo City Hall included a third-floor parking area for all city government-owned vehicles, but then-Mayor Jed Patrick Mabilog decided to convert it into additional office space instead. To address the need for parking, a six-story multilevel parking building is now under construction, as of 2025, adjacent to the city hall, on the former site of the Development Bank of the Philippines (DBP). It will also be connected to the city hall via a bridge.

== Architecture ==
Lin-ay Sang Iloilo (Lady of Iloilo) at the dome of Iloilo City Hall, seen from its rooftop.

The architecture of the Iloilo City Hall draws inspiration from the Old City Hall, incorporating neoclassical architecture while introducing new Art Deco features, including uniformly arched windows, high ceilings, a dome, and an extensive use of patio furniture.

Atop the dome of the city hall stands Lin-ay sang Iloilo (Lady of Iloilo), an 18-foot (5.5 m) bronze statue symbolizing prosperity, hope, and peace. Its design was inspired by the "Lady of Freedom" atop the U.S. Capitol Building in Washington, D.C. The statue was conceptualized by artist Ed Defensor and cast by Franz Herbich at Herbich International Art and Manufacturing Corporation in Liloan, Cebu.

== See also ==
- Old Iloilo City Hall
- Casa Real de Iloilo
