= Plaza Libertad =

Public plaza in Iloilo City

- Plaza Alfonso XII
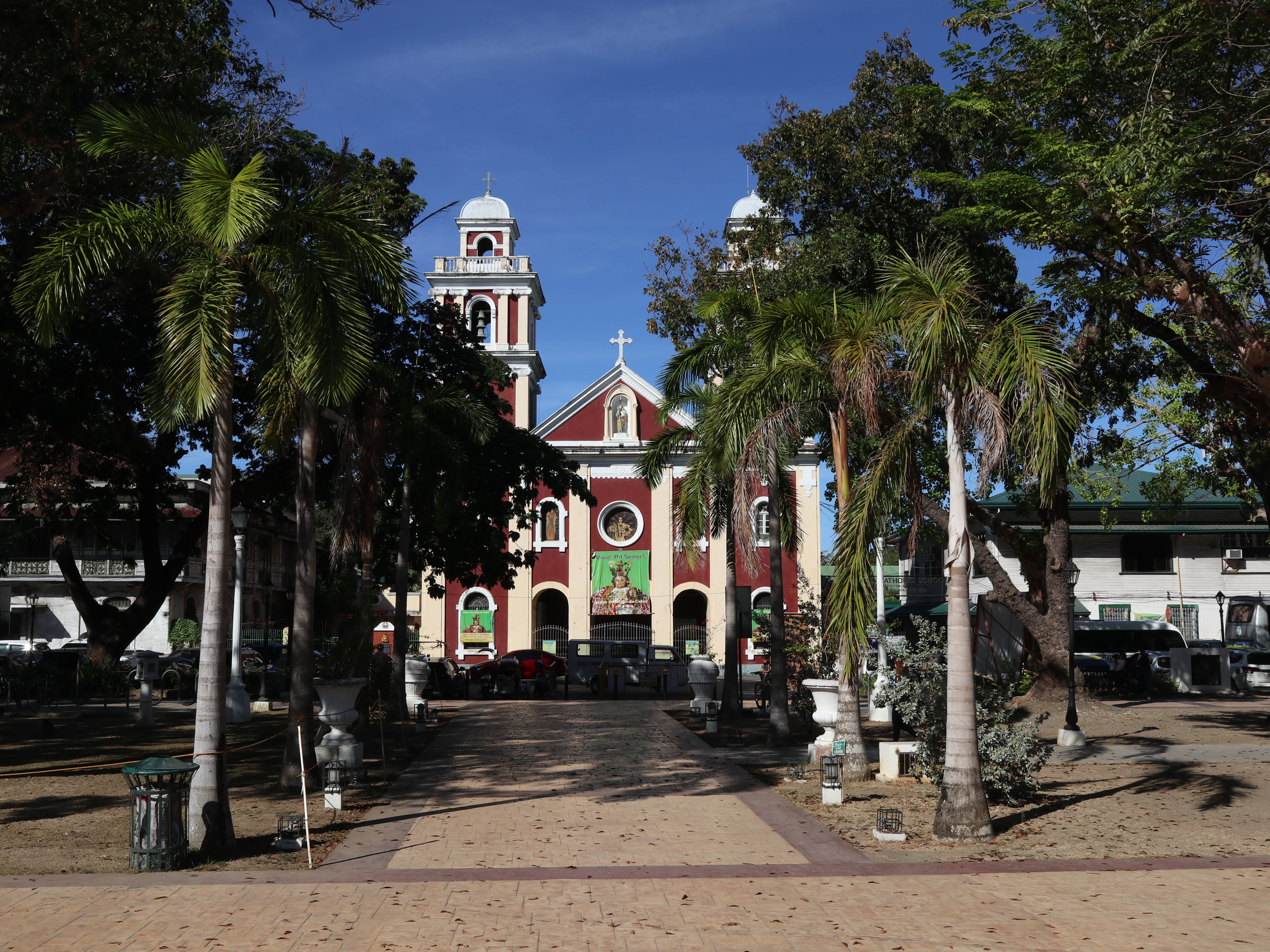
- Plaza Libertad with San Jose Church in the background
- Interactive map of Plaza Libertad
- Type: Urban park, town square
- Location: Iloilo City, Philippines
- Coordinates: 10°41′33.4716″N 122°34′25.2228″E
- Area: 1.28 hectares (3.2 acres)
- Created: 1800s
- Etymology: Alfonso XII

National Historical Landmarks
- Official name: Plaza Libertad
- Type: Structure
- Designated: May 17, 2006; 20 years ago
- Reference no.: No. 12, S. 2003
- Region: Western Visayas
- Marker date: 2006; 20 years ago

Plaza Libertad, formerly known as Plaza Alfonso XII, is a historic plaza or town square in Iloilo City, Philippines. It is considered the site where the flag of the first Philippine Republic was raised in triumph after Spain surrendered Iloilo, the last Spanish capital in Asia and the Pacific, to the revolutionary forces led by Gen. Martin Delgado on December 25, 1898.

Plaza Libertad is located in front of Iloilo City Hall in Iloilo City Proper and is one of the six district plazas in Iloilo City.

== History ==
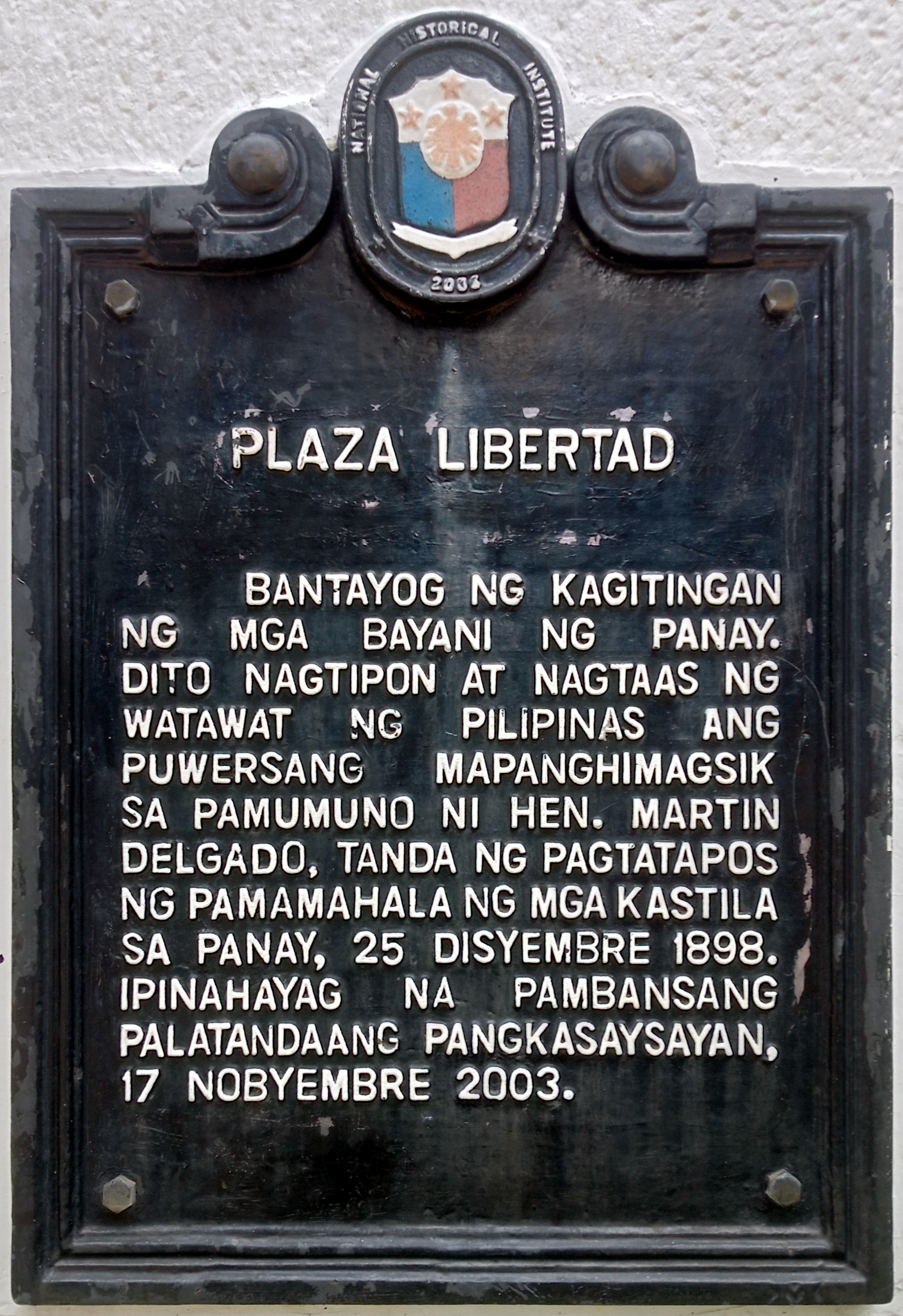
National historical marker installed in 2006

Plaza Alfonso XII, named after a king of Spain, was constructed in the 1800s and is one of the oldest plazas in the Philippines. It was surrounded by most of the government offices in Iloilo.

On Christmas Day of 1898, Governor-General Diego de los Ríos of Spain surrendered to the Filipino revolutionary troops led by General Martin Delgado in the Plaza, thus ending the 333-year-old Spanish colonization of the Philippines. After the surrender, the triumphant revolutionaries for the first time raised the flag of the First Philippine Republic in Iloilo City, the last bastion of Spanish power in the country. It was later renamed Plaza Libertad to reflect the event that happened on the plaza.

On November 17, 2003, the National Historical Institute declared Plaza Libertad a national historical landmark.

== Rehabilitation ==
On February 4, 2021, the rehabilitation of the plaza started with a cost of ₱19 million, funded by the national government through the Tourism Infrastructure and Enterprise Zone Authority (TIEZA) of the Department of Tourism. The rehab includes trimming of trees, landscaping, improvement of facilities, and lighting, among others.

== Gallery ==
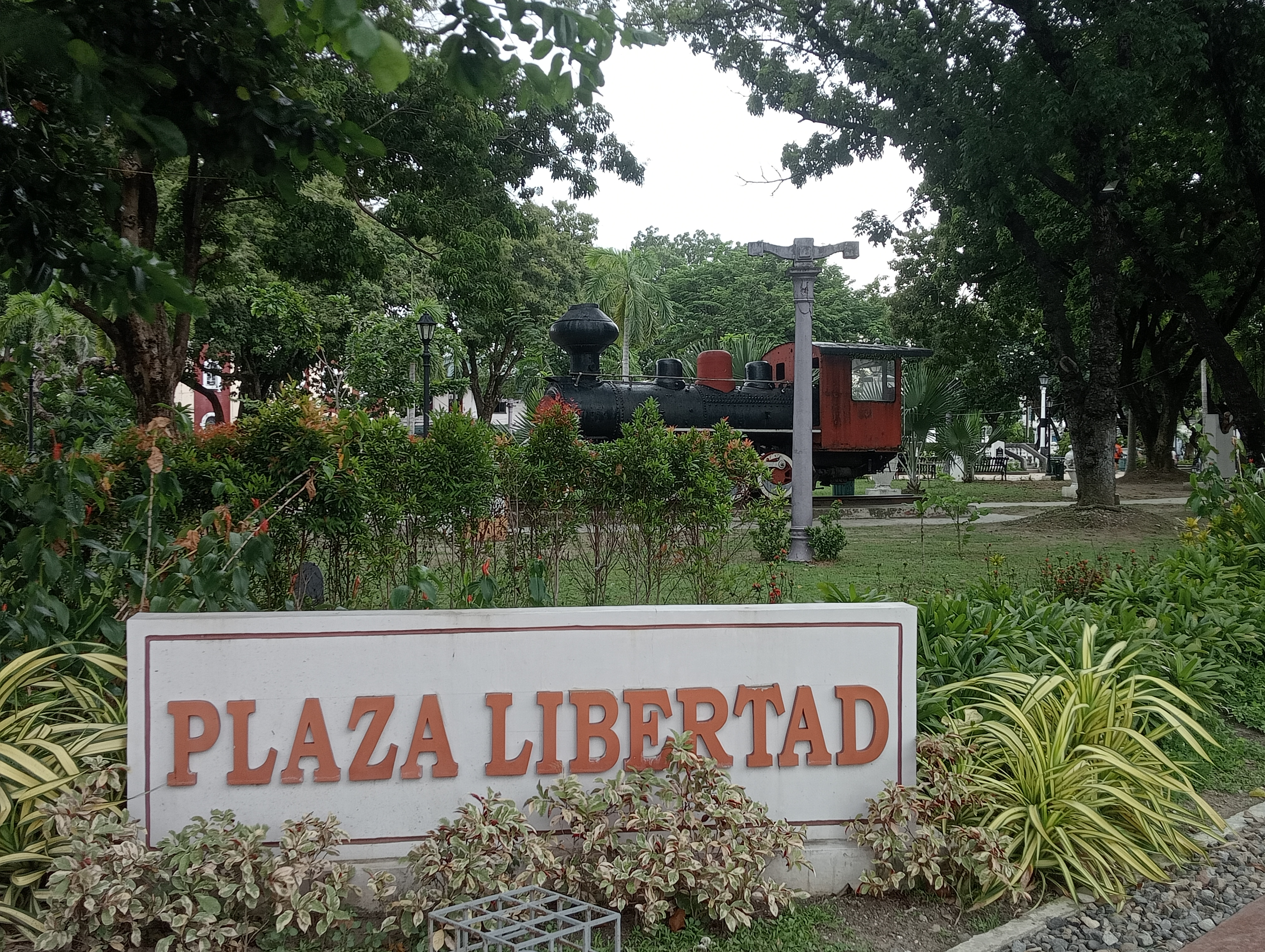
Plaza Libertad Sign

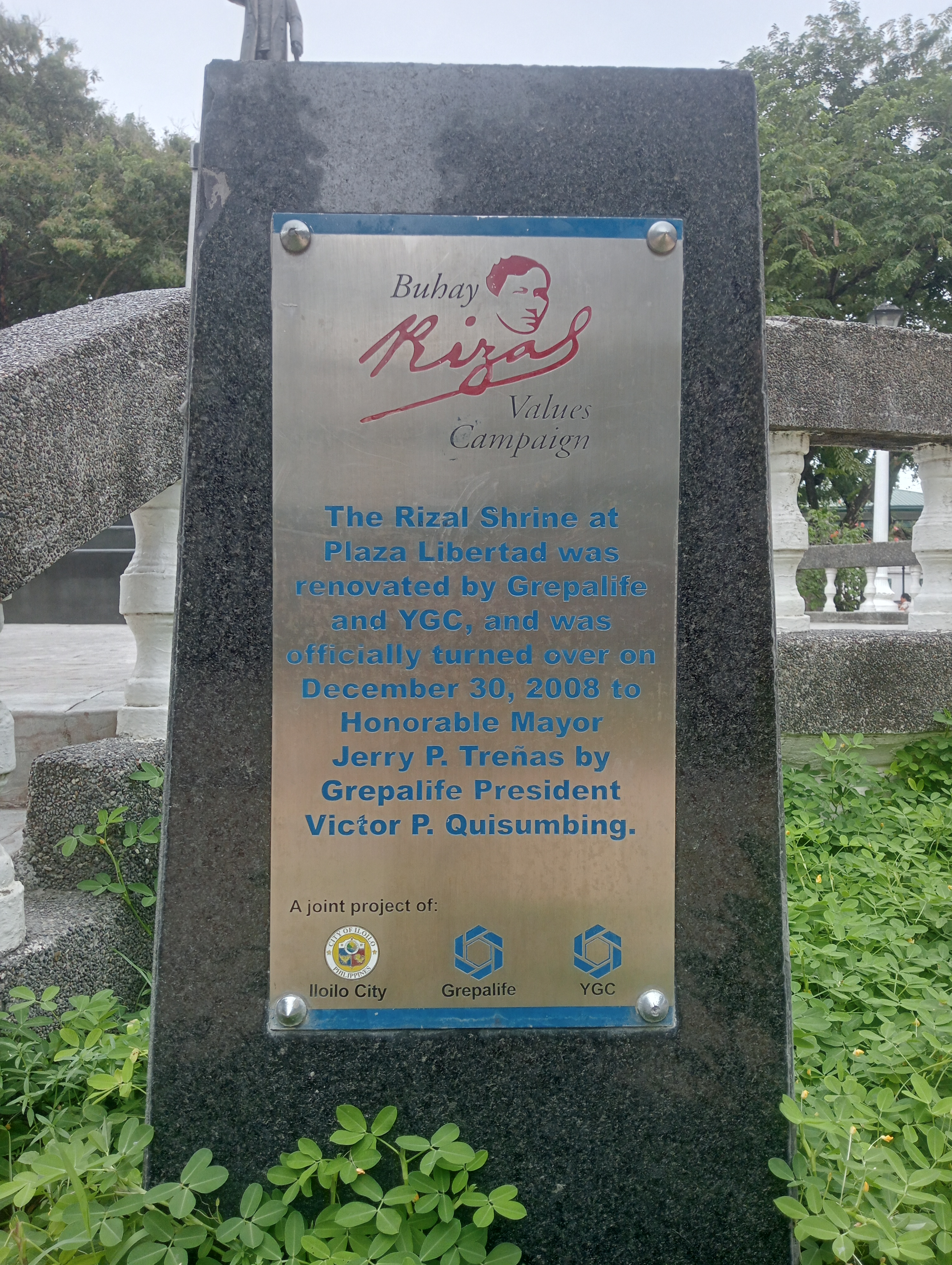
Rizal Shrine Marker

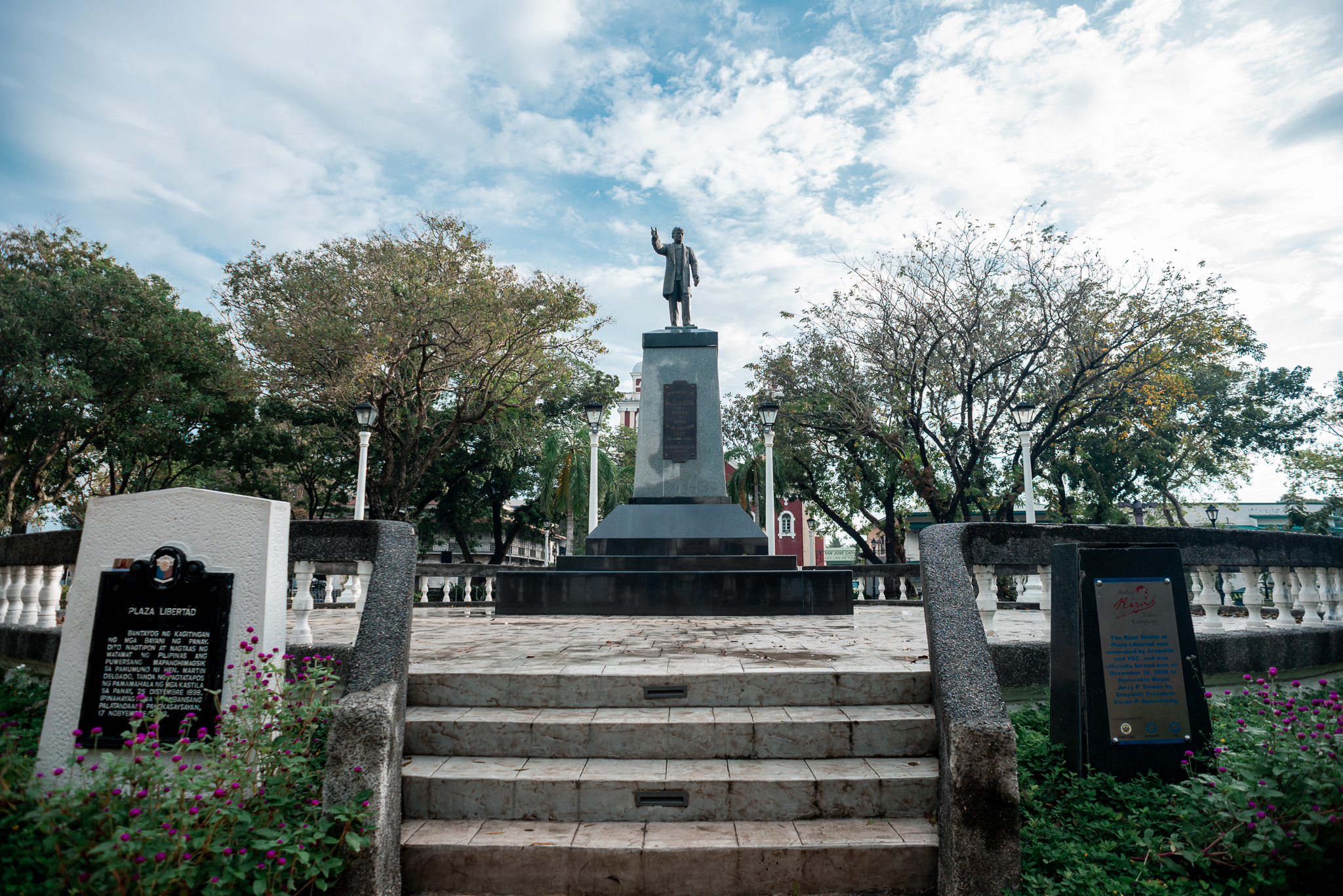
José Rizal statue

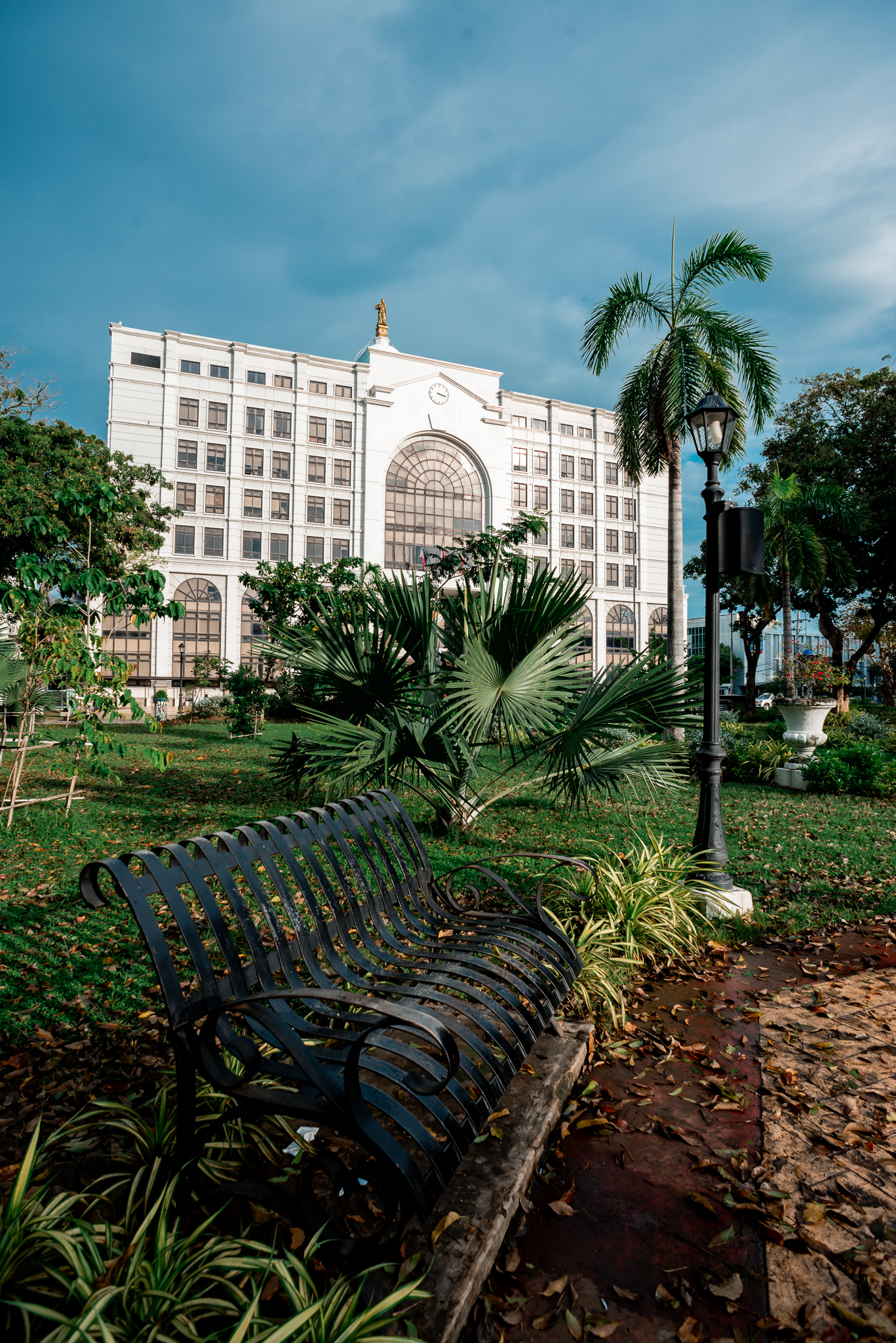
Iloilo City Hall as seen from Plaza Libertad

Plaza Libertad night view

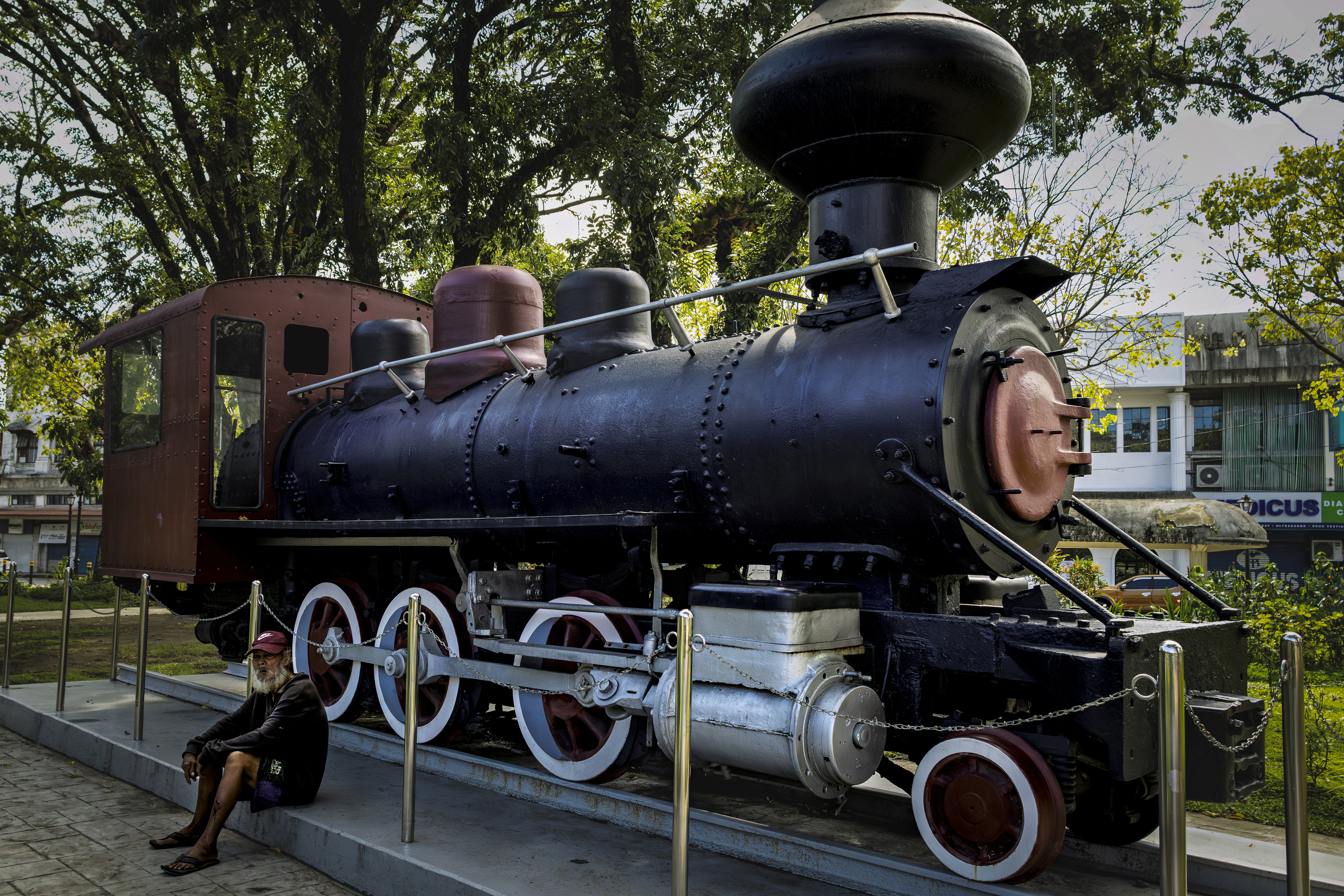
Preserved locomotive formerly used by Panay Railways
