= San Jose Church (Iloilo) =

Roman Catholic church in Iloilo, Philippines

San José Placer Parish Church
- Parokya ng San Jose Placer (Filipino); Parroquia de San Jose Placer (Spanish)
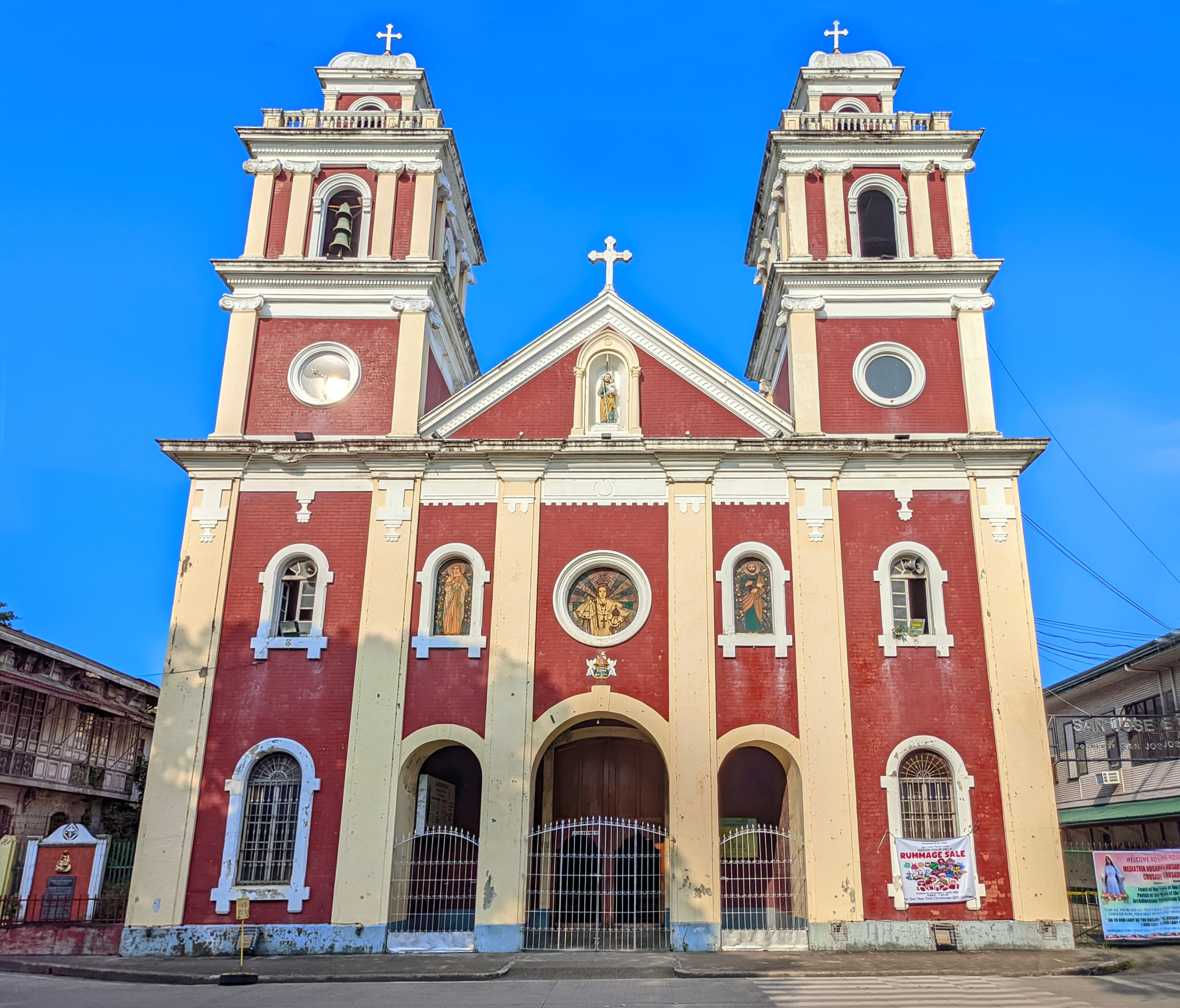
- Church façade facing the Plaza Libertad in 2011

- Location in the Visayas Location in the Philippines
- 10°41′35″N 122°34′28″E
- Location: Iloilo City Proper, Iloilo City, Iloilo
- Country: Philippines
- Denomination: Roman Catholic

History
- Status: Parish church
- Founded: 1607
- Dedication: Saint Joseph
- Consecrated: 1617

Architecture
- Functional status: Active
- Architectural type: Church building
- Style: Renaissance

Specifications
- Materials: Adobe

Administration
- Province: Iloilo
- Archdiocese: Jaro

Clergy
- Archbishop: Midyphil Billones
- Priest(s): Rev. Fr. Nelson G. Zerda, O.S.A.

San Jose Placer Parish Church, is a Roman Catholic church in Iloilo City, Philippines. It is under the jurisdiction of the Archdiocese of Jaro. It was built in 1607 by the Jesuits and is considered the first ever church in the city of Iloilo. The church houses the replica of Santo Niño de Cebú, the patron saint of the Dinagyang Festival, as well as the Our Lady of the Most Holy Rosary of Iloilo. It is located in what was once known as Plaza Alfonso XII, now Plaza Libertad, a historic plaza in Iloilo City.

== History ==
The first church in Iloilo, whose name back then was La Punta, was erected by the Jesuits in 1607, primarily as a support for the military in the area. On April 29, 1617, the Augustinians came and established a house of the order which they named "San José". They held San Jose Church until 1775, when governance was handed over to the secular clergy.

By 1873, the church of San Jose went through a renovation, essentially bolstering on what the Jesuits had already built, and is the same church being seen to this day. In line with the church’s needed overhaul, a nearby convent was also established.

During World War II, the church was saved from being bombed by the Americans after they received information that the Japanese were not holed up in the church as they were previously informed. Between 1980 and 1982, the church was renovated and a new marble floor was laid, under the direction of the poet-writer, Fr. Gilbert Centina. San Jose Church is one of the few parishes in the Philippines still under the Augustinians.

== Architecture ==
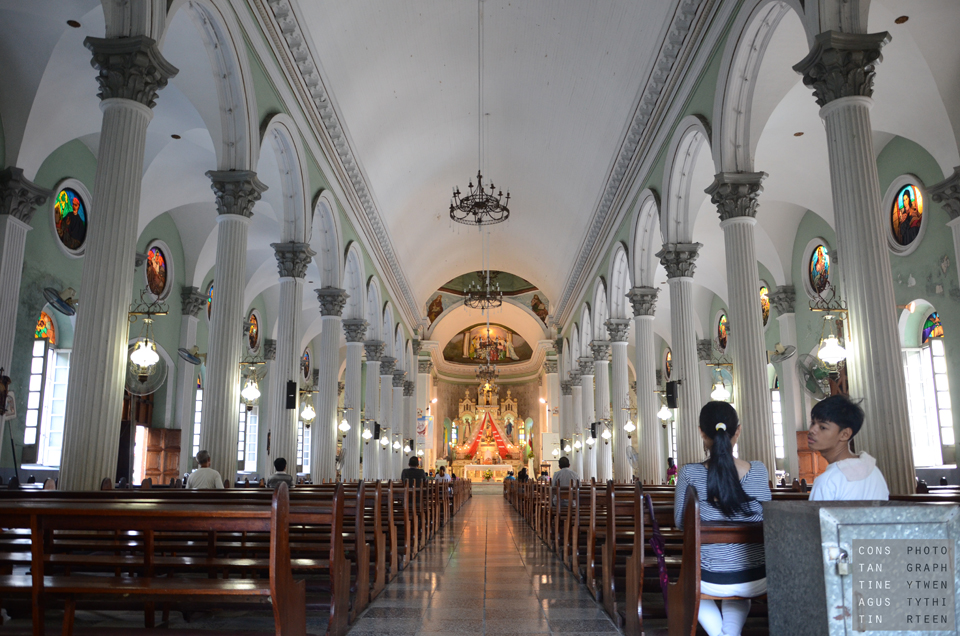
Church nave in 2013, featuring arcades of Corinthian columns

San Jose Church adheres to the Renaissance design, fused with Hellenic elements. In support of the central nave is an arcade of Corinthian pillars. The church is designed to resemble the Latin Cross, with the exception of a dome at the center. The church's interior has an arcade of Corinthian columns supporting a faux barrel vault over the nave and groin vaults over the aisle. The main altar has some Gothic touches. An image of the Nuestra Senora del Rosario can also be found in the church, which was discovered by Diego Quinnes during the Dutch siege of Iloilo on September 30, 1616.
