= Iloilo Supermart =

Supermarket in the Philippines

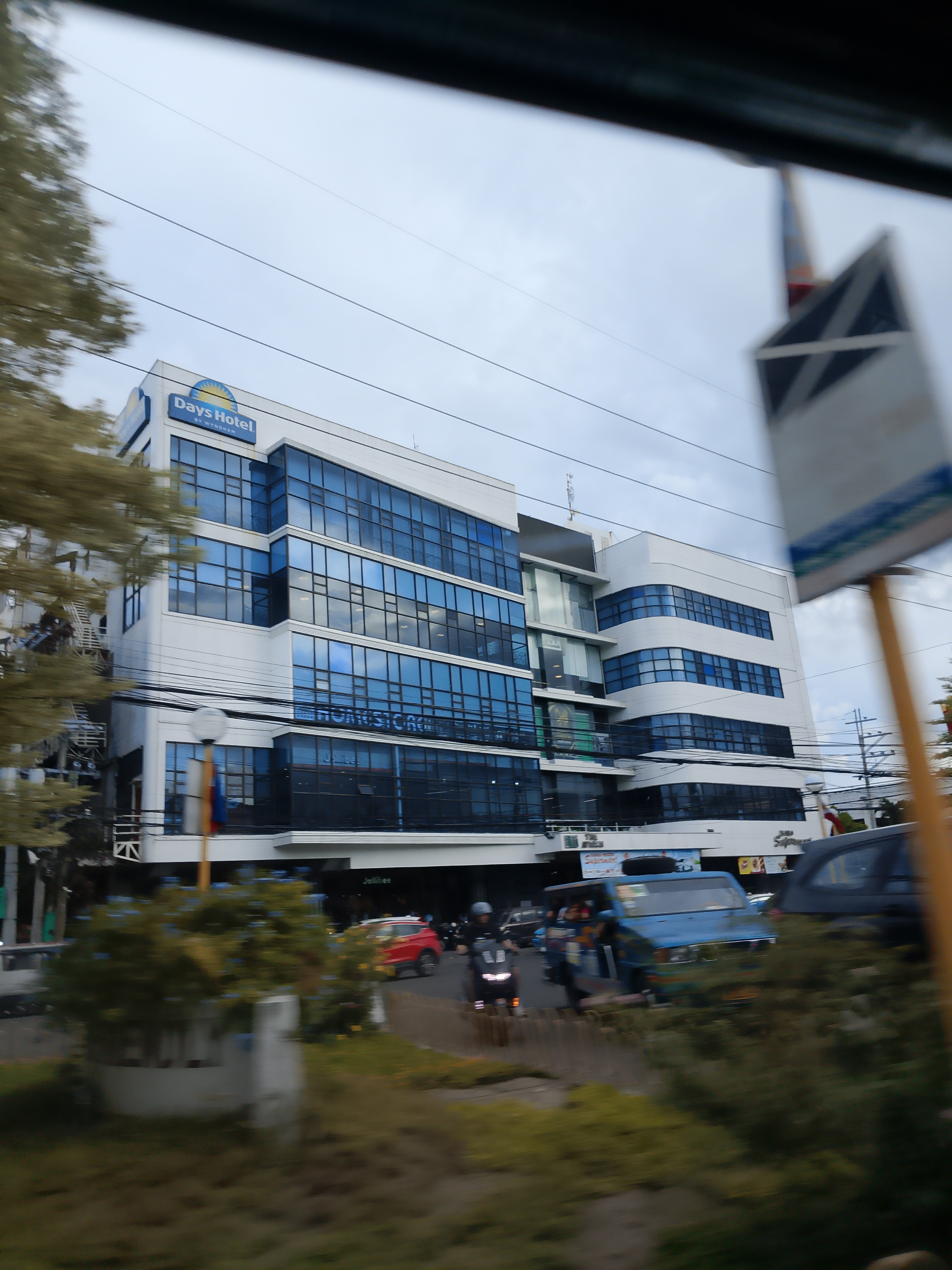
- Atrium Branch at Iloilo City Proper
- Type: Subsidiary
- Industry: Retail
- Predecessor: Washington Supermart
- Founded: 1948; 78 years ago
- Founder: Que Hua Pho
- Headquarters: Iloilo City, Philippines
- Area served: Metro Iloilo
- Key people: Alejandro Que (Chairman & CEO)
- Parent: Que Group
- Website: iloilosupermart.com

Iloilo Supermart, Inc. (shortly known as Supermart) is a supermarket chain operating in Metro Iloilo, Philippines. It is the largest homegrown supermarket chain in Western Visayas. The chain operates its anchor stores and other brands that include Paper Chase, Homestore, Tinapayan, Medicine Corner, ISX Superstore, The Atrium at the Capitol, and Right Choice.

As of October 2023, the chain had a total of ten branches all over Metro Iloilo.

== History ==
The supermarket chain was established in 1948 by Que Hua Pho, more popularly known as "Papa George, with the name Washington Supermart, after acquiring Hoskyn & Co. It was located at the Hoskyn's Building on the corner of J.M. Basa and Guanco Streets, Iloilo City Proper. The first branch under the name Iloilo Supermart on the corner of Delgado and Valeria Streets was later established after the successful establishment of Washington Supermart.

In the 1980s, the company expanded in the districts of Jaro and Molo.

In 1994, The Atrium at the Capitol was inaugurated, housing the largest Iloilo Supermart branch at the time. Subsequent expansions occurred in Mandurriao in 2004 and Arevalo in 2010. The chain continued to expand its presence, with the opening of the Tagbak branch at CityMall Tagbak in Jaro in 2015 and the ninth and largest branch at CityMall Ungka II in Pavia in March 2018, the first branch outside Iloilo City.

On October 2, 2023, Iloilo Supermart opened its tenth and second branch in Pavia, in QHP Plaza in Jibao-an.

== Branches ==
Branch Name	Image	Opening Date	Location
Washington Supermart		1948	J.M. Basa Street, City Proper, Iloilo City
Iloilo Supermart Delgado		1972	Marymart Center, Delgado Street cor. Valeria Street, City Proper, Iloilo City
Iloilo Supermart Jaro		1980s	MacArthur Highway, Tabuc Suba, Jaro, Iloilo City
Iloilo Supermart Molo		1980s	Locsin Street, cor. San Jose Street, Molo, Iloilo City
Iloilo Supermart Atrium		1994	General Luna Street cor. Valeria Street, City Proper, Iloilo City
Iloilo Supermart Mandurriao		2004	Q. Abeto Street, Mandurriao, Iloilo City
Iloilo Supermart Villa		October 15, 2010	Quezon Street, Arevalo, Iloilo City
Iloilo Supermart Tagbak		October 10, 2015	CityMall Tagbak, MacArthur Highway, Tagbak, Jaro, Iloilo City
Iloilo Supermart Ungka		March 23, 2018	CityMall Ungka, Benigno S. Aquino Jr. Avenue, Pavia, Iloilo
Iloilo Supermart Jibao-an		October 2, 2023	QHP Plaza, Jibao-an, Pavia, Iloilo

== Washington Supermart ==
Washington Supermart, initially known as Washington Commercial, was established in 1948 in the Hoskyn's Building, succeeded Hoskyn's Department Store after the acquisition of Hoskyn & Co. by the Que Family. Washington Commercial was the Que Family's second store after Washington Grocery on Iznart Street. Washington Commercial was later renamed Washington Supermart. The supermarket, which anchors the Hoskyn's Building, remains known as Washington Supermart to this day, despite its succeeding branches being named Iloilo Supermart.
