= Iloilo City Proper =

District of Iloilo City, Philippines

Iloilo City Proper La Punta (Spanish) Downtown Iloílo
- Administrative and central business district
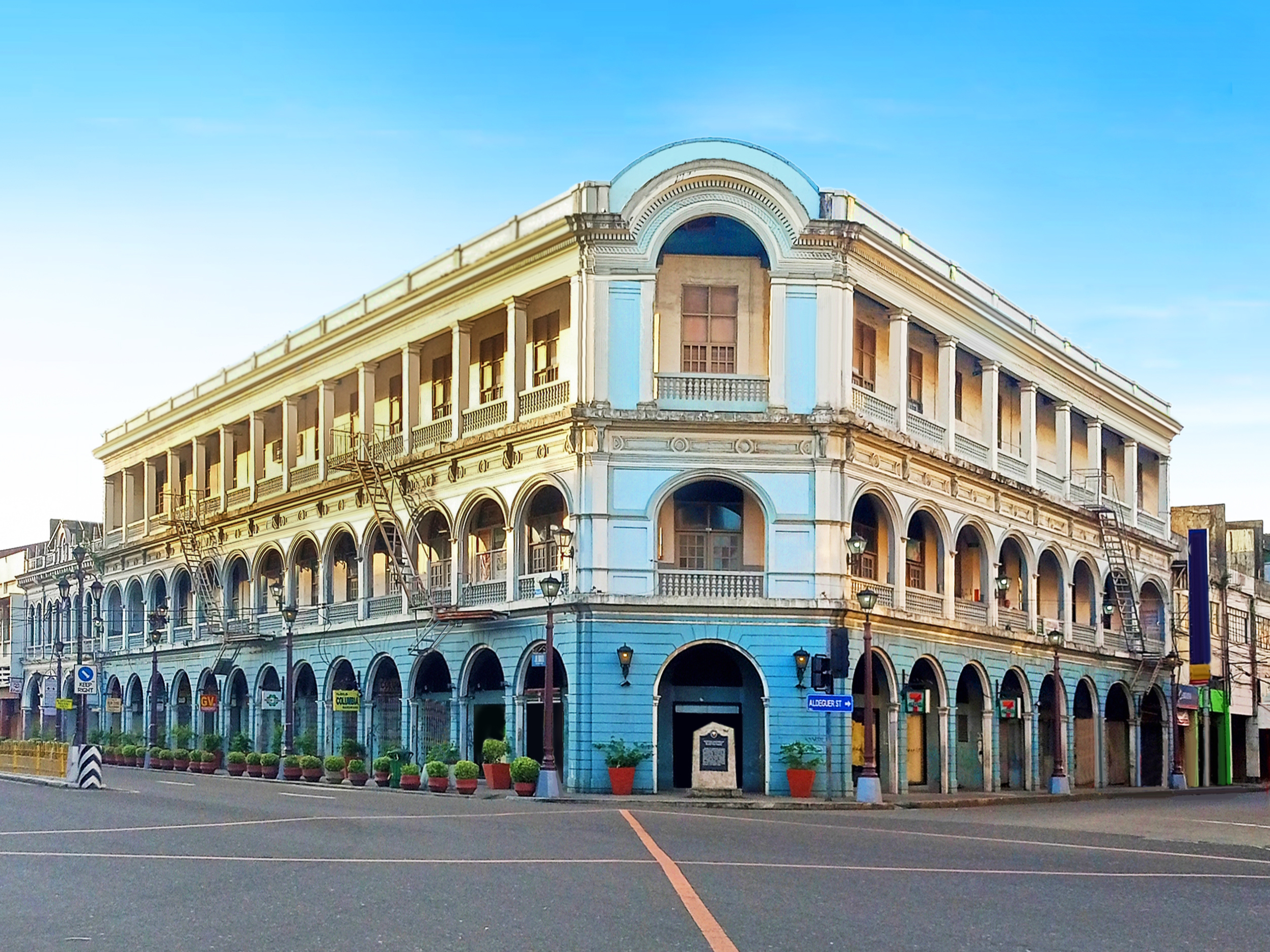
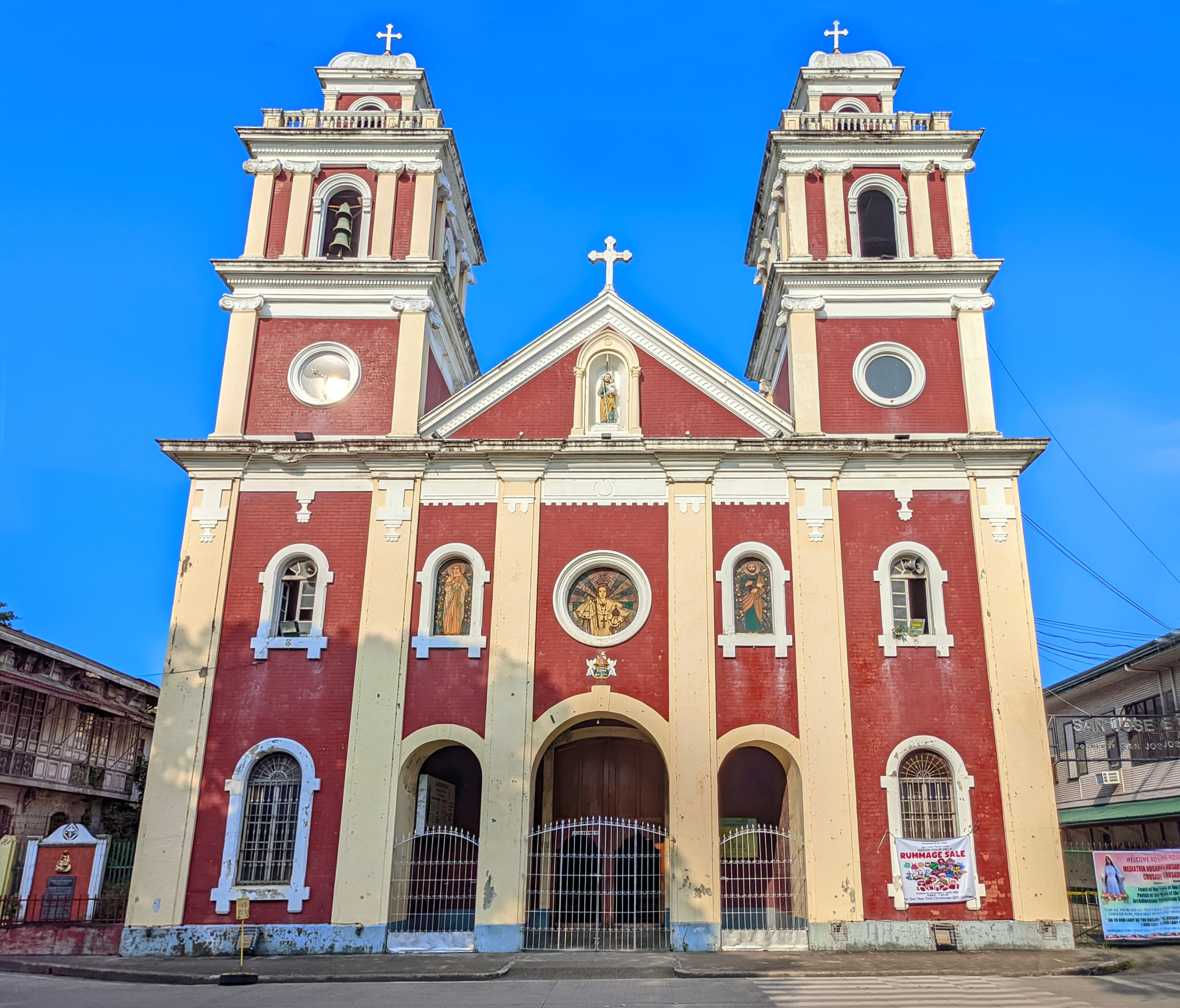
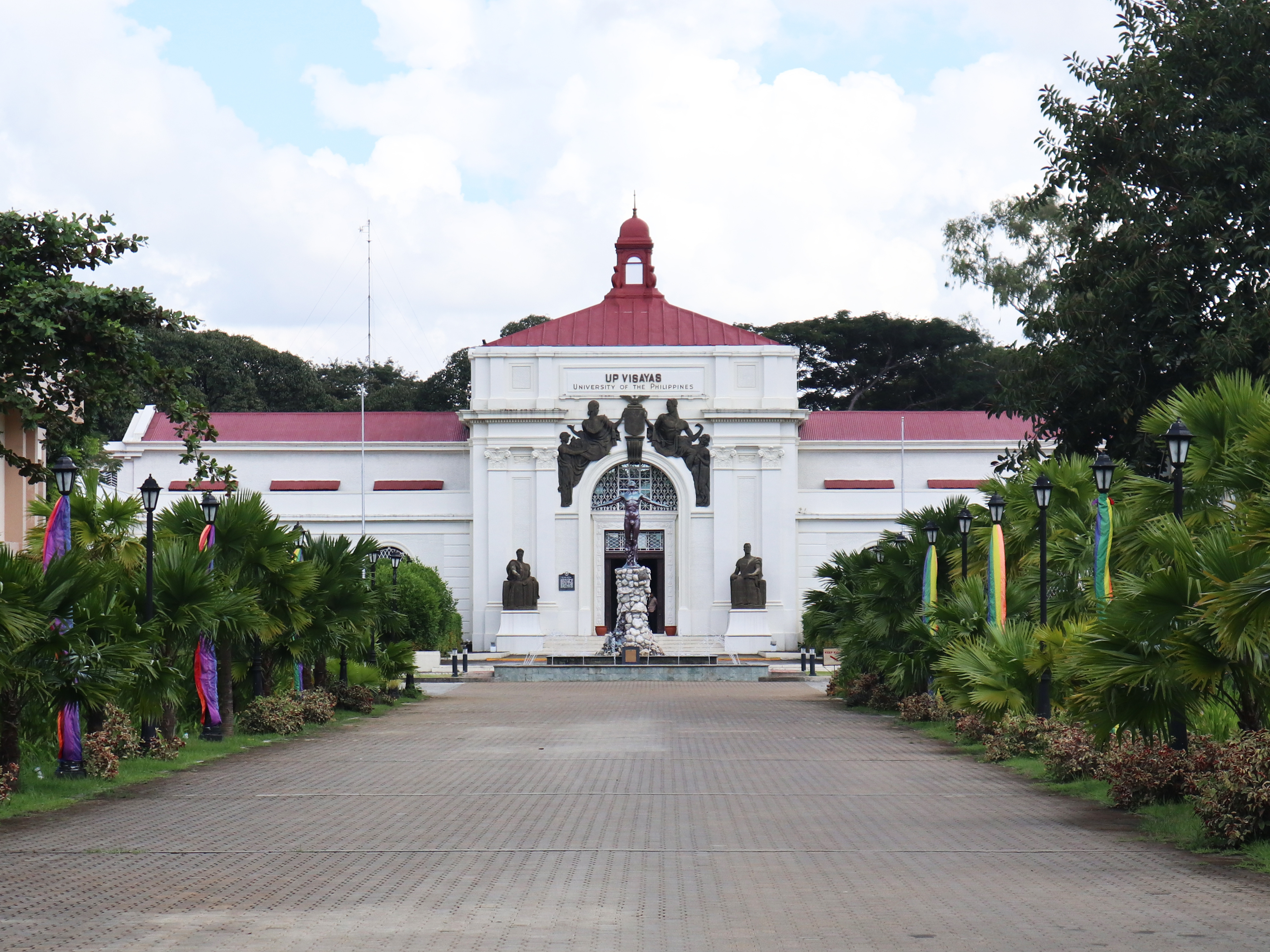
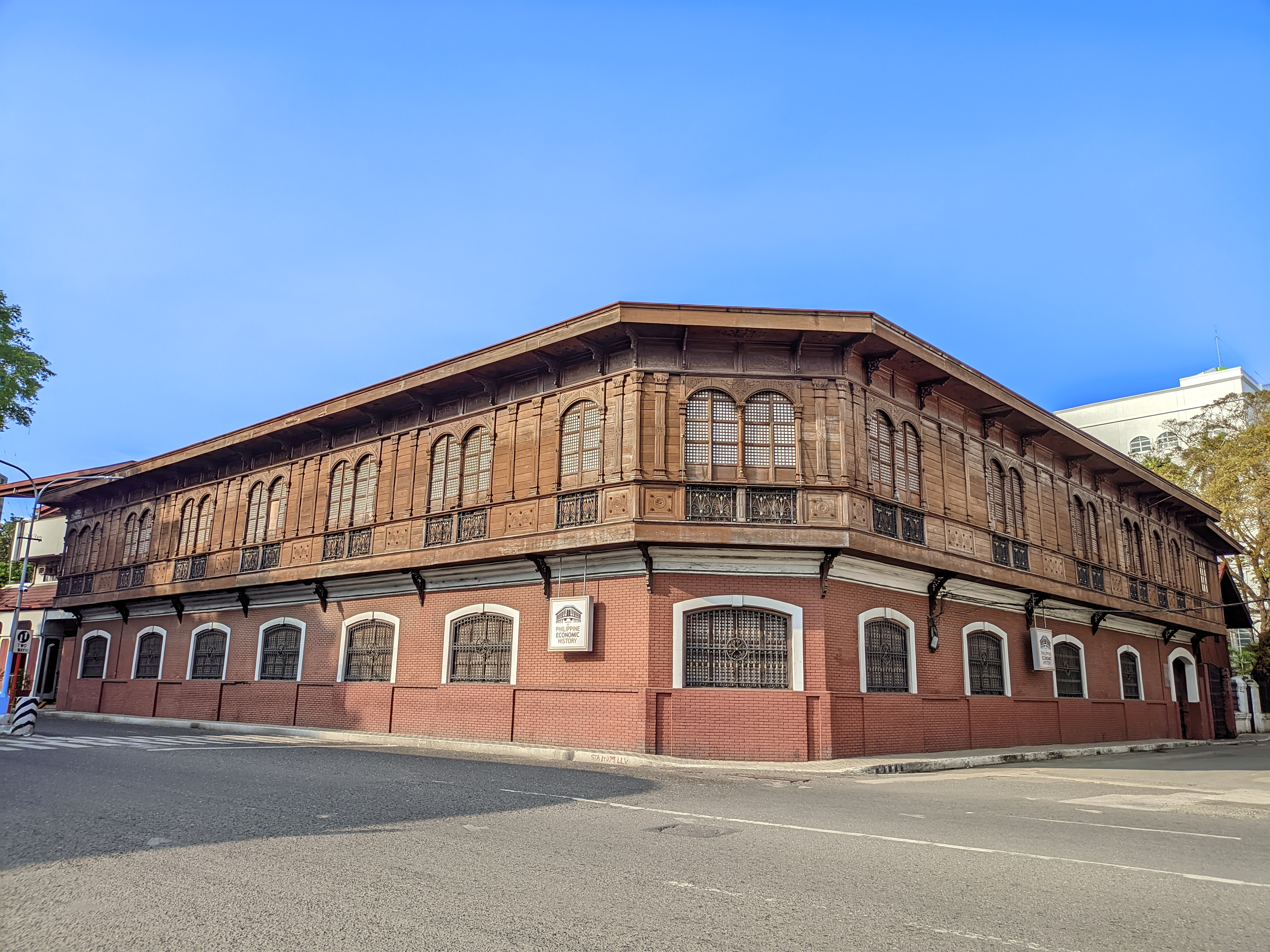
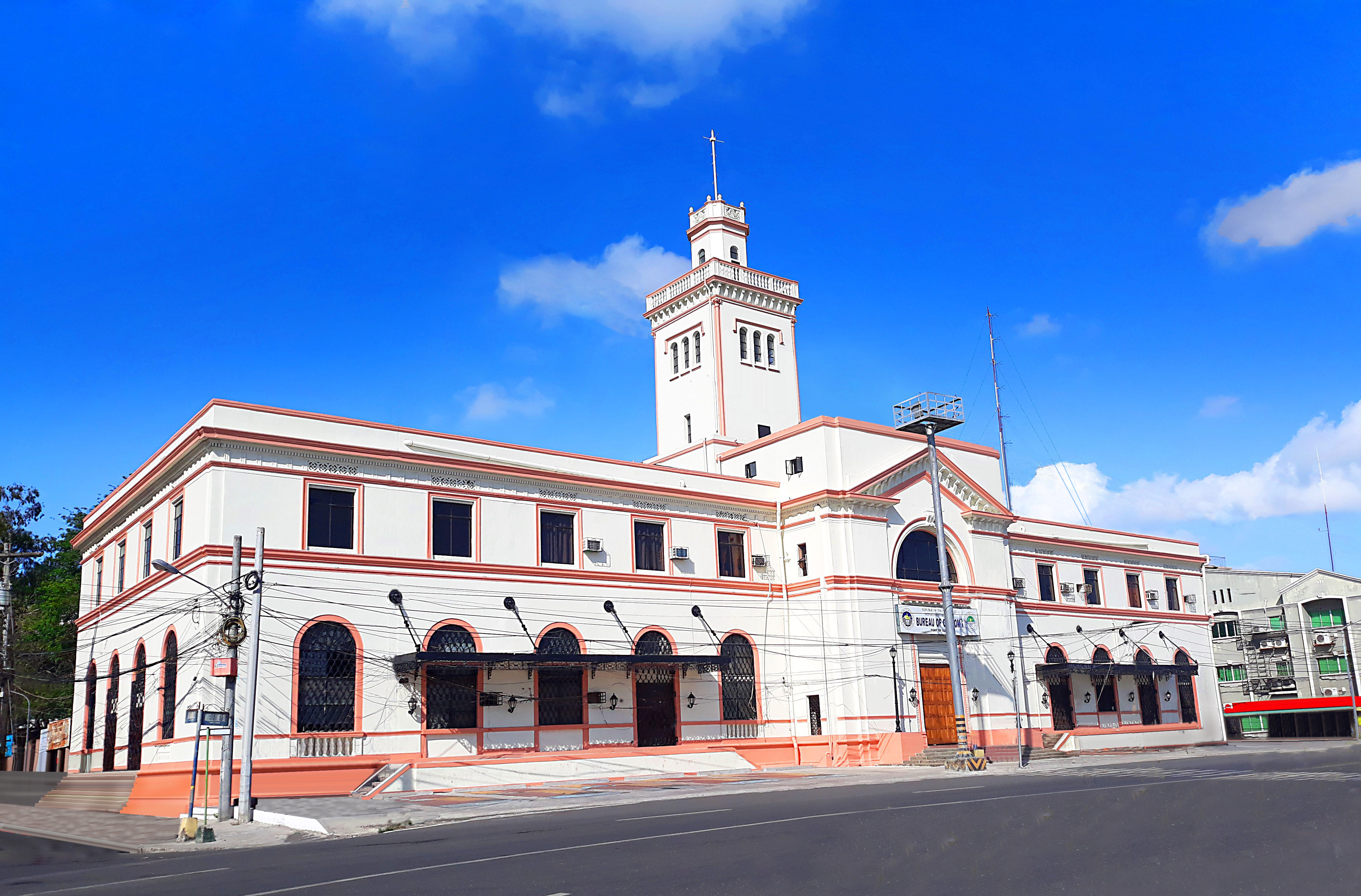
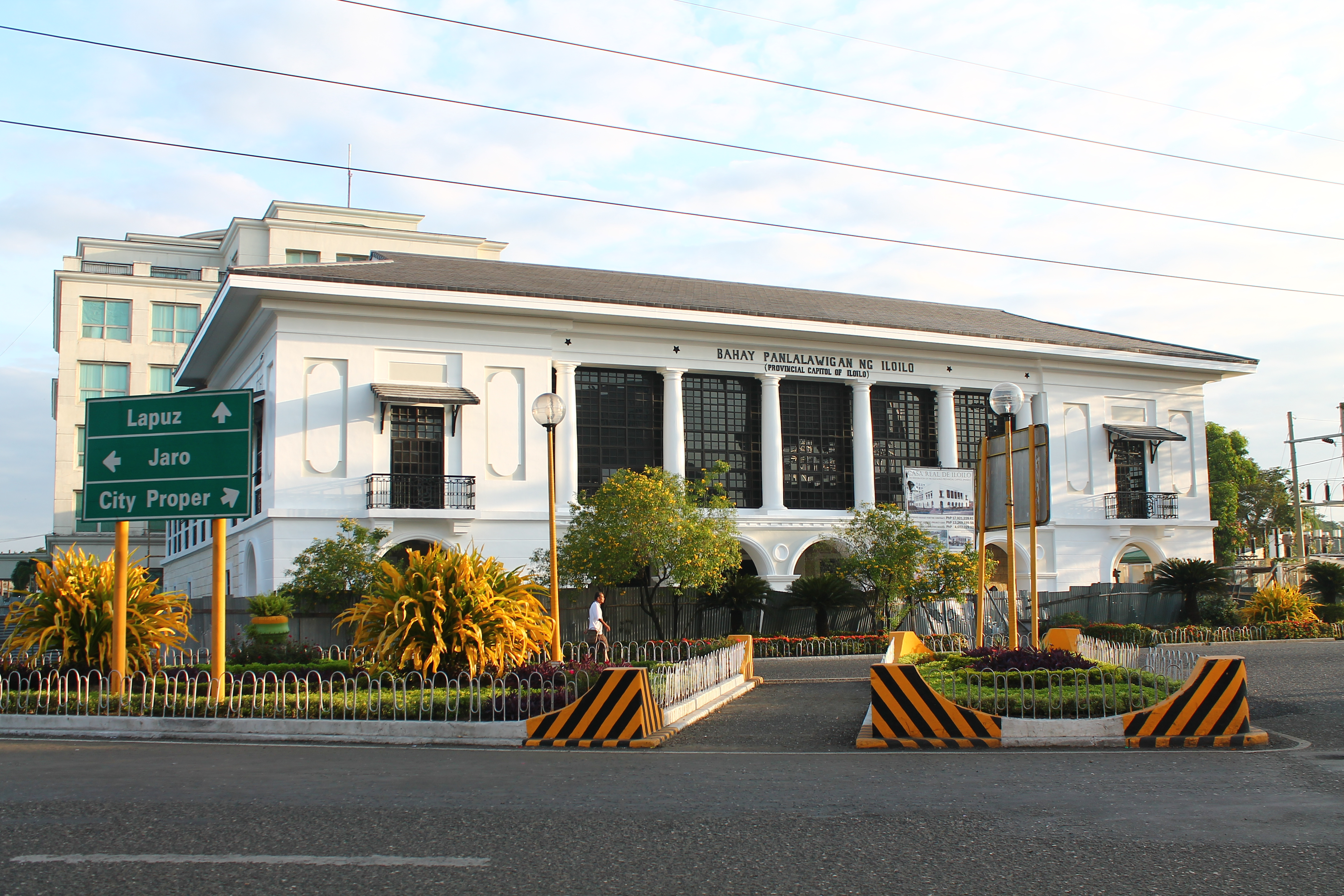
- From top, left to right: Skyline; Eusebio Villanueva Building; San Jose Church; Old Iloilo City Hall; Museum of Philippine Economic History; Iloilo Customs House; Casa Real de Iloilo
- Nicknames: Old Iloilo, Heart of Iloilo
- Motto(s): La muy leal y noble ciudad (The Most Loyal and Noble City)
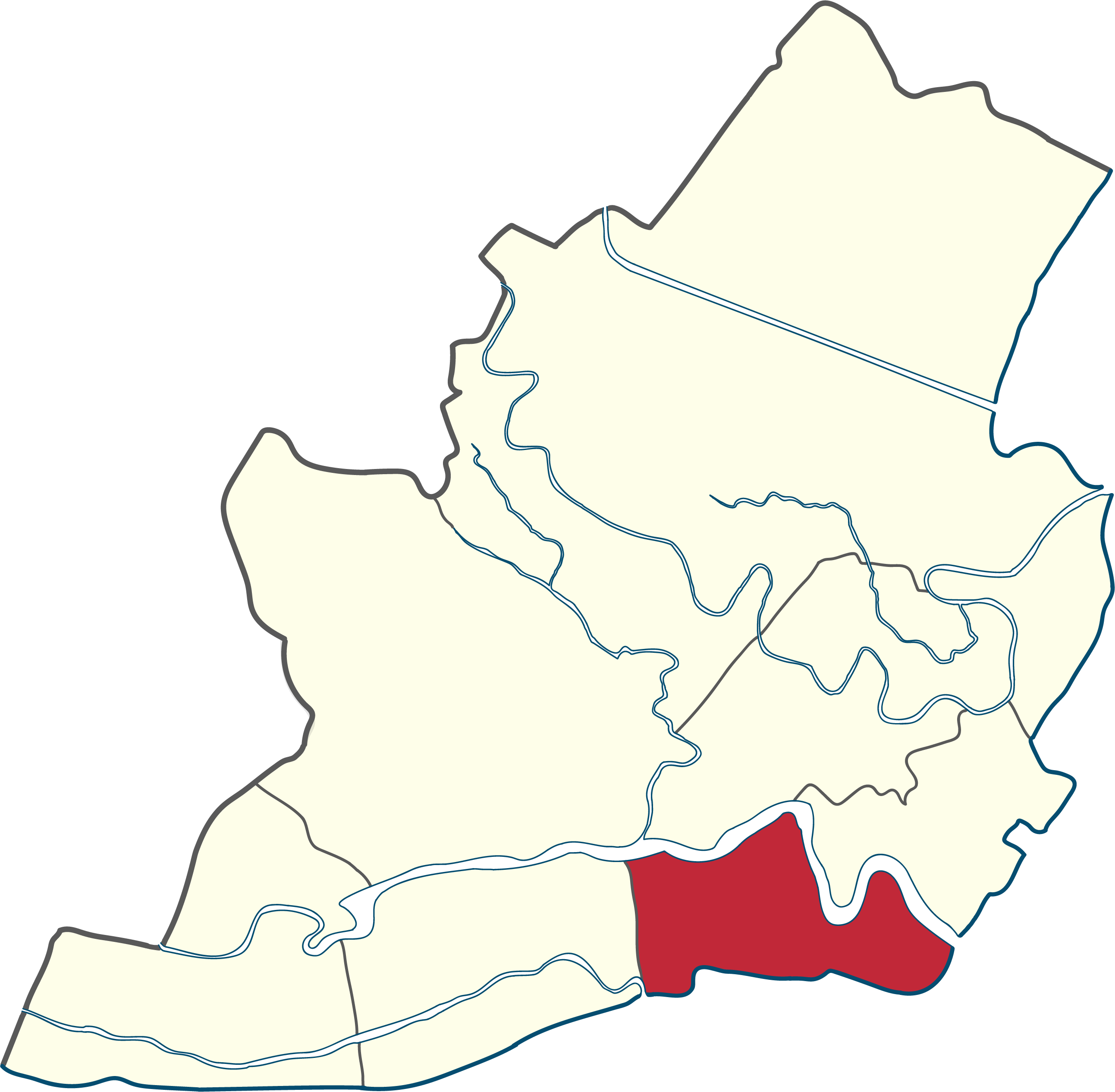
- Location within Iloilo City

- Location in the Philippines Iloilo City Proper (Philippines)
- Coordinates: 10°41′42.7194″N 122°33′52.92″E
- Country: Philippines
- Region: Western Visayas (Region VI)
- Province: Iloilo (geographically only)
- City: Iloilo City
- Congressional District: Lone district of Iloilo City
- Established: 1602
- Cityhood: October 5, 1889
- Consolidation: August 25, 1937
- Barangays: 45 (see Barangays)

Government
  - District ABC President: Madonna Martin

Area
  - Total: 3.75 km^{2} (1.45 sq mi)

Population (2024 census)
  - Total: 47,231
  - Density: 12,600/km^{2} (32,600/sq mi)
- Demonym: Ilonggo
- Time zone: UTC+8 (Philippine Standard Time)
- ZIP code: 5000
- Area code: 33
- Patron saint: Santo Niño (district patronal saint)
- Feast day: Fourth Sunday of January in honor of Señor Santo Niño (coincides with Dinagyang Festival)
- Native languages: Hiligaynon
- Website: www.iloilocity.gov.ph

Iloilo City Proper, also known as Downtown Iloilo or simply Iloilo among locals, is an administrative district in Iloilo City, Philippines, located on the southeastern coast of the island of Panay in the Western Visayas region. It serves as the civic center of the city and province of Iloilo, hosting the seat of city and provincial governments, as well as other local, provincial, and regional government offices. According to the 2024 census, it has a population of 47,231 people.

Before its consolidation with the surrounding municipalities, Iloilo City Proper was the old town and the original city of Iloilo. Established in 1602, it gained cityhood status on October 5, 1889, through a royal decree, and was honored with the title "La Muy Leal y Noble Ciudad" (The Most Loyal and Noble City). In 1898, it served as the last capital of the Spanish Empire in Asia and the Pacific.

Iloilo City Proper is known for its well-preserved 19th and 20th-century architecture, particularly along J.M. Basa Street, popularly referred to as Calle Real. It remains one of the major business districts of the city, alongside the rapidly developing district of Mandurriao.

== Etymology ==
The name "Iloilo" is derived from the older name "Irong-irong" (Philippine Spanish: Ilong̃-ílong̃) meaning "nose-like", referring to the promontory between two rivers (Iloilo and Batiano) where the Fort San Pedro and the 17th-century Spanish port in the district were located. Over time, the name influenced the consolidated greater city of Iloilo, as well as the entire province.

== History ==
=== Early history ===
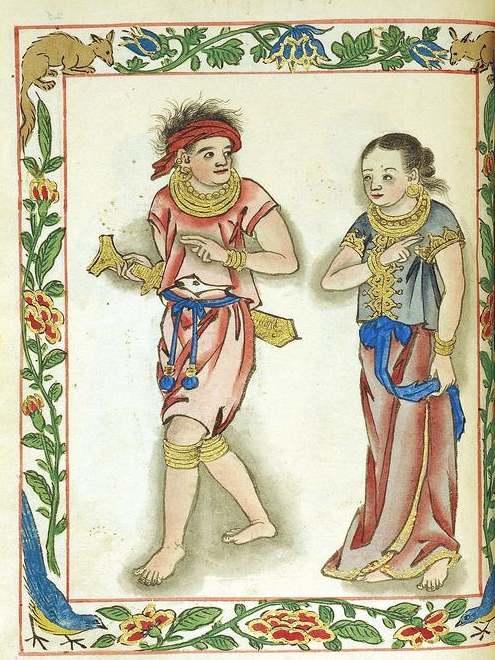
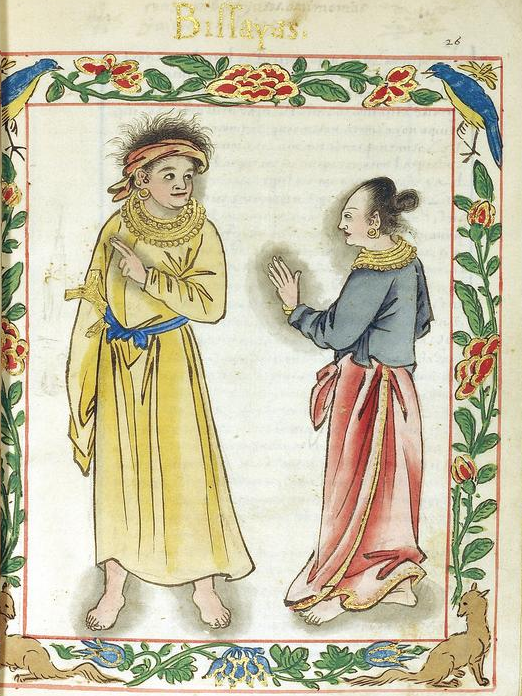
Images from the Boxer Codex (c. 1595), illustrating ancient Visayans

Little is known about the history of the region prior to the arrival of the Spanish. However, numerous legends exist about the origins of the Hiligaynon people. One of the most famous is the Maragtas epic by Pedro Monteclaro, first published in 1907. It tells the story of ten datus and their families, led by Datu Puti, who fled the "kingdom of Borneo" to escape the oppressive rule of Sultan Makatunaw. They arrived in Panay and negotiated the purchase of the lowlands from King Marikudo of the Ati people. The settlers established themselves at the mouth of the Iloilo River, naming the area Irong-irong, under the leadership of Datu Paiburong.

Once widely accepted and included in school textbooks, the Maragtas (along with the Code of Kalantiaw) is now regarded as a 20th-century fabrication. Historian William Henry Scott’s 1968 critique debunked its authenticity, a view supported by experts like Gregorio Zaide and Teodoro Agoncillo. A 2019 thesis by Talaguit highlights an earlier version of the story recorded by Augustinian Friar Rev. Fr. Tomas Santaren in 1902. Santaren's account, based on manuscripts he obtained in Iloilo after 1858, corroborates much of Monteclaro's narrative. However, these manuscripts, written in romanized Hiligaynon during the colonial era, likely reflect oral folklore rather than pre-colonial history. While the Maragtas may contain elements of local folk traditions, it is not considered an authentic historical document but rather a blend of myth and invention.

=== Colonial period ===
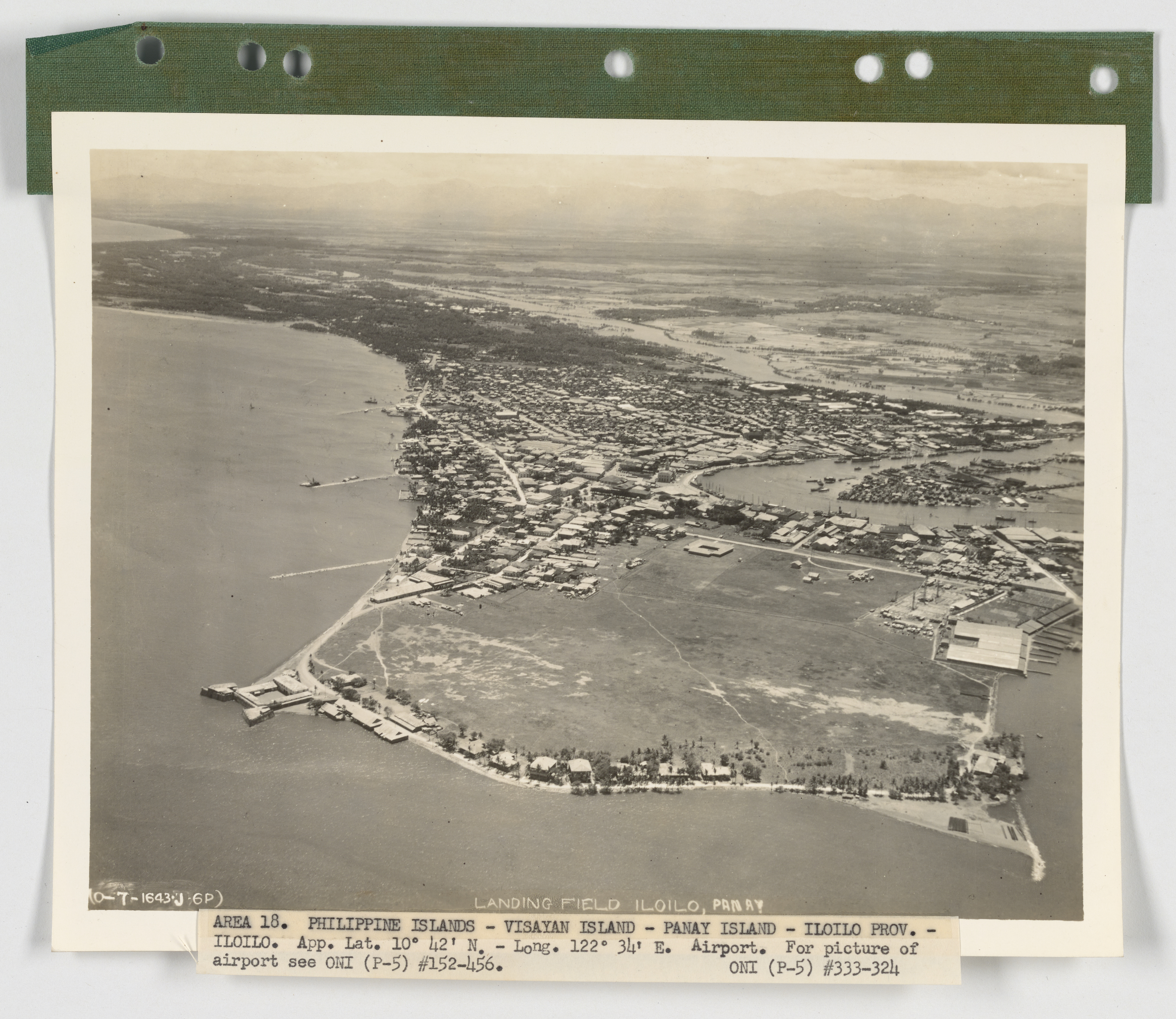
Aerial view of Iloilo City Proper, circa early 1900s.

In 1602, Spanish and Chinese residents from Jaro and Molo, respectively, expanded their settlements to the nearby area of Irong-Irong, naming it La Punta. By 1700, due to continuous attacks by Moro pirates and Dutch forces, the Spanish transferred their capital and seat of power from La Villa Rica de Arevalo to La Punta, which later became known as Iloilo.

The area emerged into a significant trading port in the 19th century. Its strategic location and economic importance attracted leading countries like China, Norway, and the United Kingdom to establish consulates in the city. This was especially evident after Iloilo was declared an international port in the 1850s, which spurred a surge in commercial activity. The city saw rapid development, with the construction of infrastructure, recreational facilities, educational institutions, banks, and foreign consulates.

On October 5, 1889, due to its economic prominence as the second most important port in the Philippines after Manila, Iloilo was elevated from a town to a city by royal decree. The city government was formally established in 1890.

Iloilo's loyalty to Spain earned it the perpetual title of "La Muy Leal y Noble Ciudad" (Most Loyal and Noble City), granted by Queen Regent Maria Christina on March 1, 1898. Over time, this title evolved into the city's nickname, the 'Queen City of the South', being the second most important Spanish port after Manila and its location in the southern part of the archipelago.

On December 25, 1898, the Spanish government surrendered to Ilonggo revolutionaries led by General Martin Delgado at Plaza Alfonso XII (now Plaza Libertad). The event marked the first raising of the Philippine flag on the island of Panay, making Iloilo its last Spanish colonial center in Asia and the Pacific.

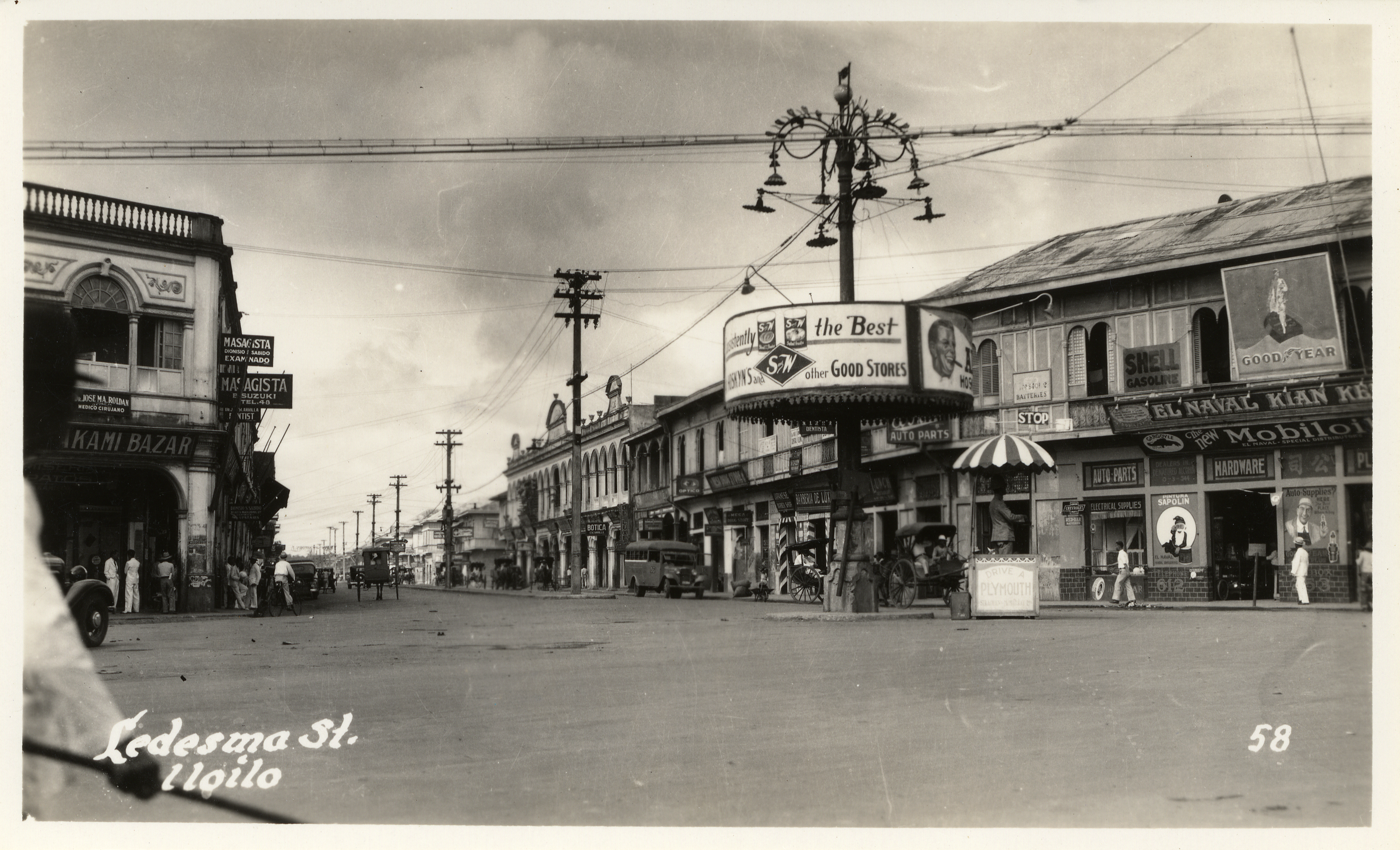
Plazoleta Gay and Ledesma Street, 1920s

The city expanded under a new Commonwealth charter, which legally took effect on July 16, 1937, consolidating the neighboring municipalities of Molo, Arevalo, Mandurriao, and La Paz into its jurisdiction. This unified layout was formally inaugurated as the chartered City of Iloilo on August 25, 1937. Later, on January 7, 1941, the municipality of Jaro was also integrated to form greater Iloilo City.

=== Late 20th and early 21st centuries ===
On February 7, 1966, a fire devastated Iloilo City Proper, destroying nearly three-quarters of the area. The blaze lasted approximately 12 hours and resulted in ₱50 million worth of property damage (1966 value), making it the most destructive fire in the city's history.

In the early 21st century, Iloilo City experienced a significant economic boom. While much of the new major developments occurred outside Iloilo City Proper, the district remains the economic and political center for both the city and the entire province.

== Geography ==
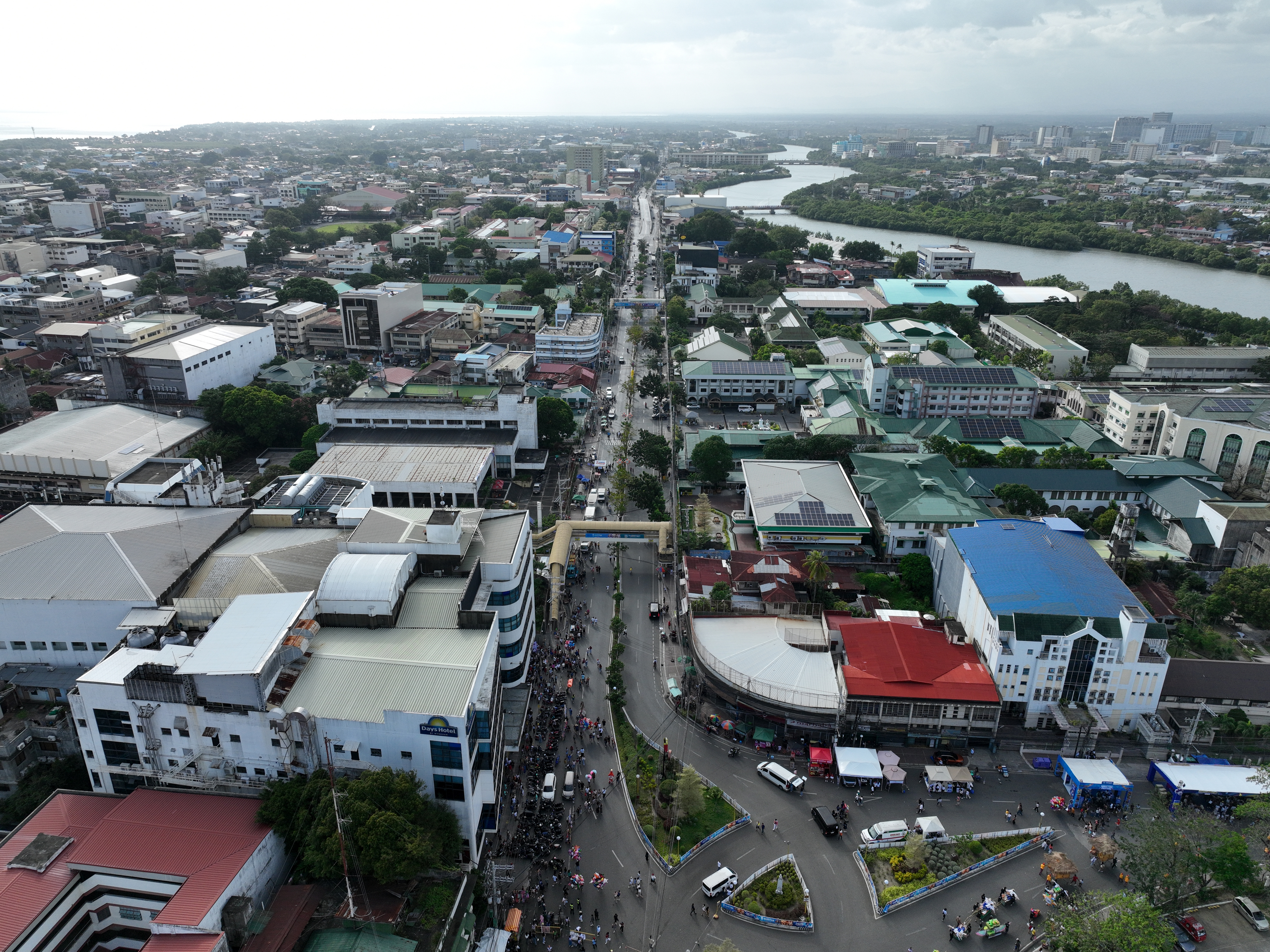
Aerial view of General Luna Street in Iloilo City Proper, looking toward the Molo and Mandurriao districts

Iloilo City Proper sits on the southeastern tip of Panay Island, facing the Iloilo Strait and Guimaras. It is bordered by Molo to the west, and separated from Mandurriao to the northwest, La Paz to the north, and Lapuz to the northeast by the Iloilo River. Just across the strait are Buenavista and Jordan in Guimaras.

Iloilo City Proper, along with parts of Molo and Arevalo, is surrounded by the Iloilo-Batiano river system, which formed an almost-island area or a river island that separated from the mainland of Panay in the southern part of Iloilo City.

=== Barangays ===
Iloilo City Proper has the most number of barangays in Iloilo City, with a total of 45.

- Arsenal Aduana
- Baybay Tanza
- Bonifacio Tanza
- Concepcion-Montes
- Danao
- Delgado-Jalandoni-Bagumbayan
- Edganzon
- Flores
- General Hughes-Montes
- Gloria
- Hipodromo
- Inday
- Jalandoni-Wilson
- Kahirupan
- Kauswagan
- Legaspi dela Rama
- Liberation
- Mabolo-Delgado
- Magsaysay
- Malipayon-Delgado
- Maria Clara
- Monica Blumentritt
- Muelle Loney-Montes
- Nonoy
- Ortiz
- Osmeña
- President Roxas
- Rima-Rizal
- Rizal Estanzuela
- Rizal Ibarra
- Rizal Palapala I
- Rizal Palapala II
- Roxas Village
- Sampaguita
- San Agustin
- San Felix
- San Jose
- Santo Rosario-Duran
- Tanza-Esperanza
- Timawa Tanza I
- Timawa Tanza II
- Veterans Village
- Villa Anita
- Yulo-Arroyo
- Zamora-Melliza

== Economy ==
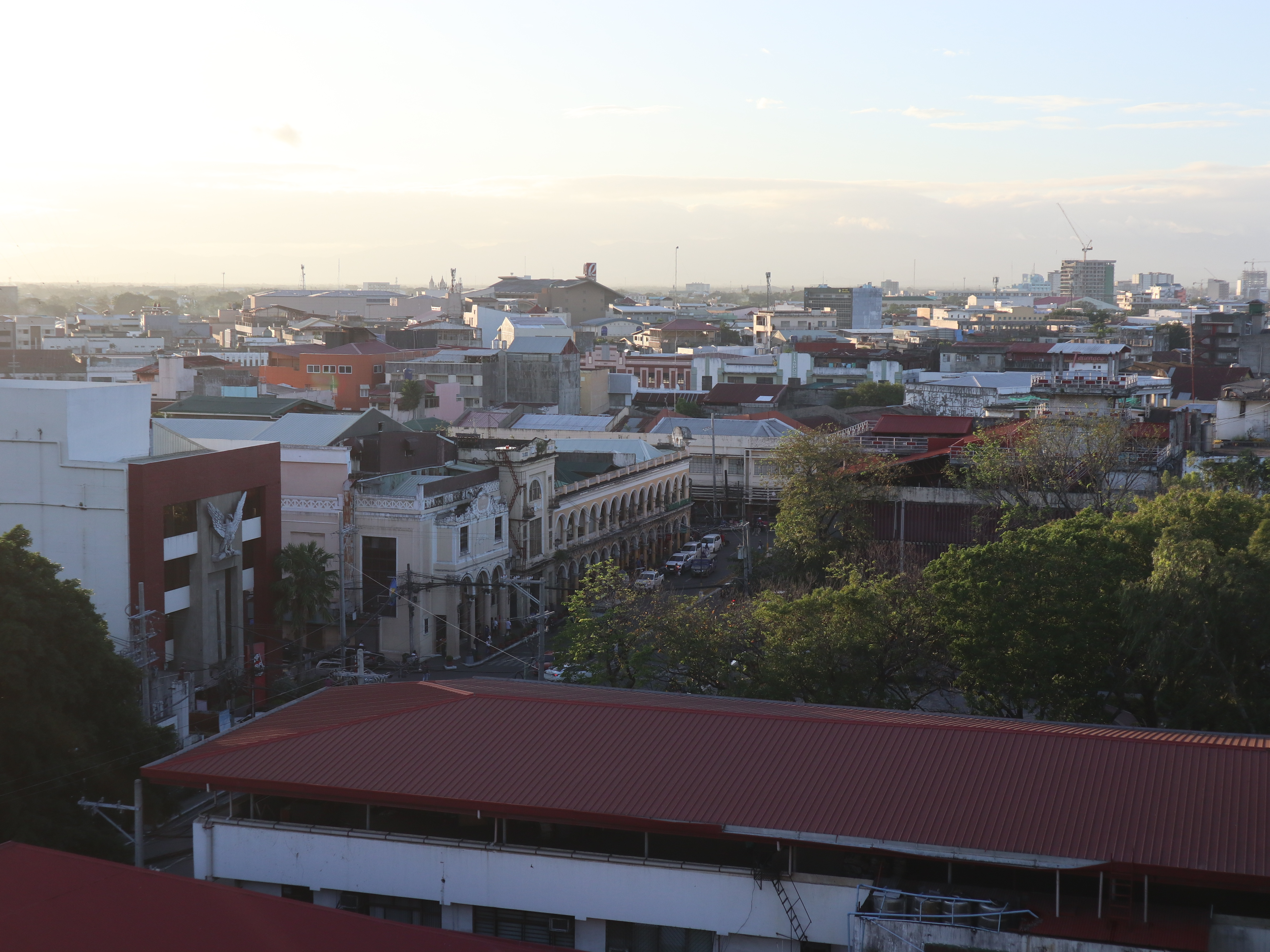
Iloilo Central Business District, the center of business in old Iloilo.

Iloilo City Proper has long been the hub for trade, commerce, banking, finance, education, retail trading, real estate, and industry in Iloilo since its establishment in the early 17th century. As the original territory of the city, it has maintained its position as the economic center of Iloilo. The district has one of the highest concentrations of banks and financial institutions in the country. Major streets like Calle Real, Iznart Street, General Luna Street, and Ledesma Street are major thoroughfares home to numerous service and commercial establishments.

However, the district has faced space limitations for further growth due to its dense urban development. In recent years, proposals have emerged for island-type reclamation along the southern shores of the City Proper. The expansion plan aims to create additional commercial areas, addressing the challenge of limited space and ensuring the district's continued economic growth. The proposal comes as modern developments have increasingly concentrated in other districts, particularly Mandurriao, over the past two decades.

== Government ==
Iloilo City Hall grounds.

Iloilo City Proper serves as the government center for both the city of Iloilo and the province of Iloilo. It houses major government buildings, including the Iloilo Provincial Capitol and the Iloilo City Hall. Numerous other government agencies and offices are also located within the district, making it the administrative center of the region.

== Education ==
Iloilo City Proper is home to half of the universities in Iloilo City. Some of the notable universities and schools in the district are the following:

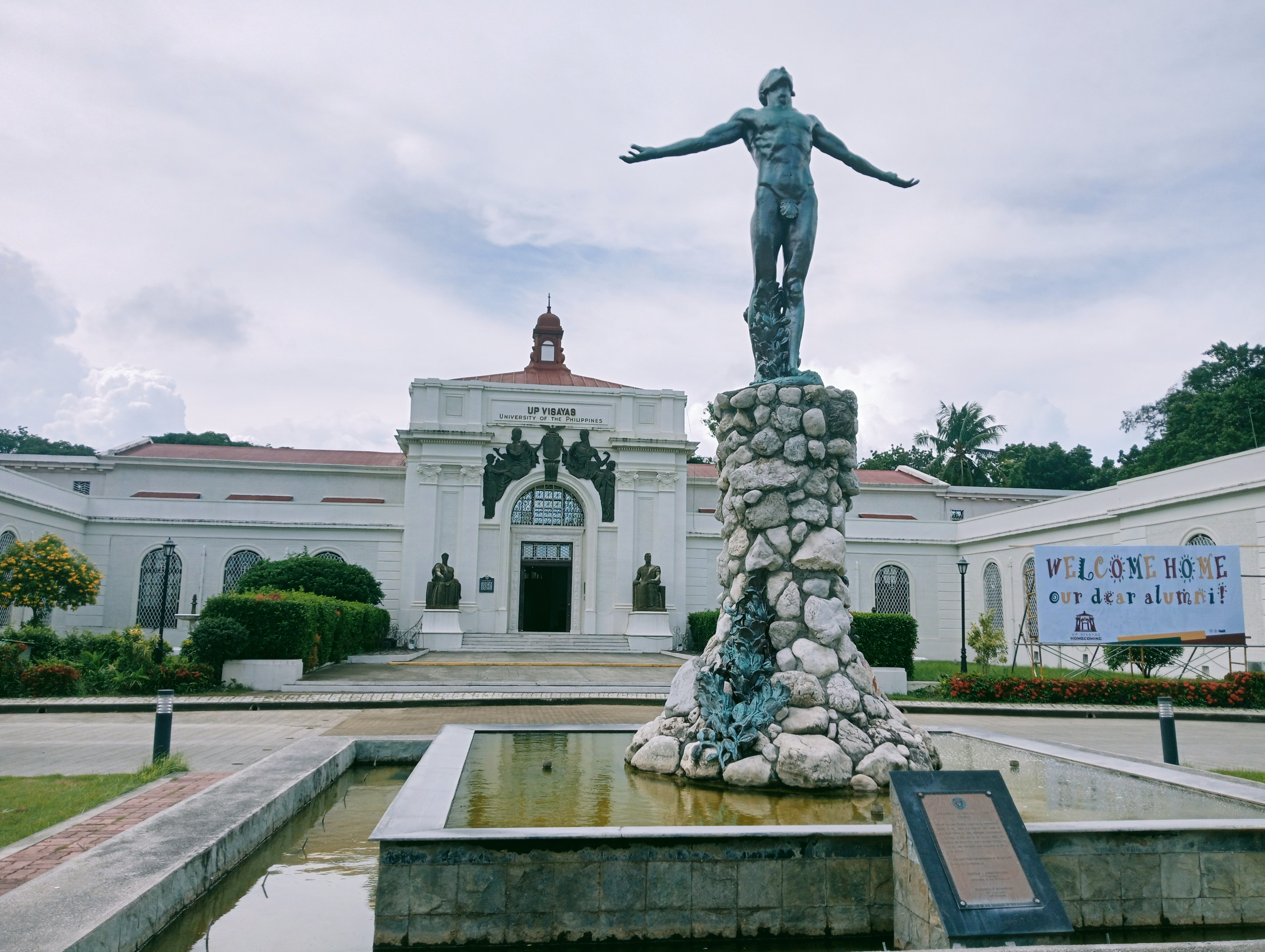
University of the Philippines Visayas – Iloilo City campus's oblation and main hall.

Higher education institutions:

- University of the Philippines Visayas – founded in 1947.
- University of San Agustin – the first university in Western Visayas, founded in 1904.
- University of Iloilo – founded in 1947.
- St. Paul University Iloilo – founded in 1946.
- Hua Siong College of Iloilo – founded in 1912.
- Colegio de las Hijas de Jesus – founded in 1936.
- Colegio del Sagrado Corazon de Jesus – founded in 1917.
- Cabalum Western College – founded in 1945.

Basic educational institutions:

- Assumption Iloilo
- Sun Yat Sen High School
- Ateneo de Iloilo – Santa Maria Catholic School
- Iloilo Central Elementary School
- SPED Integrated School for Exceptional Children
- Iloilo American Memorial School
- Manuel L. Quezon Elementary School – Kahirupan
- Rizal Elementary School – Bonifacio Tanza
- I. Arroyo Elementary School
- San Jose Elementary School – Rizal Street
- Rizal Elementary School
- Center for West Visayan Studies
- A. Montes Elementary School I
- A.Montes Elementary School 2
- Fort San Pedro National High School

== Transportation ==
=== Public transport ===
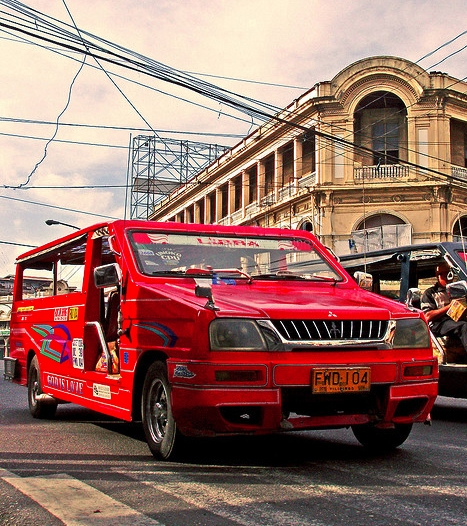
Jeepneys roaming in Calle Real, Iloilo City Proper.

The primary modes of public transportation in Iloilo City Proper are passenger jeepneys and metered taxis. The transportation routes in Iloilo City are mostly focused on the district, which is the center of commerce in the city.

In contrast to President Rodrigo Duterte's administration's plan to phase out old, dilapidated jeepneys as the primary mode of mass public transportation in the Philippines, the city has recently begun to adopt mini-buses like modern PUJs or modern Jeepneys that are now plying in the city, including Iloilo City Proper.

=== Cycling ===
Iloilo City has been hailed as the "Bike Capital of the Philippines." There are also several painted bicycle lanes in Iloilo City Proper that can be found on its main roads, including General Luna Street, Delgado Street, Mabini Street, Infante Street, and the esplanade along Muelle Loney Street.

=== Railway ===
From 1907 to the 1980s, Panay Railways operated a railroad from Roxas City to the port area of Iloilo City Proper. In 2022, Panay Railways announced its opening to foreign ownership to reconstruct its former train lines, which will reconnect the district and city to other major cities in Panay, including Caticlan in Malay, Aklan.

=== Airport and seaport ===
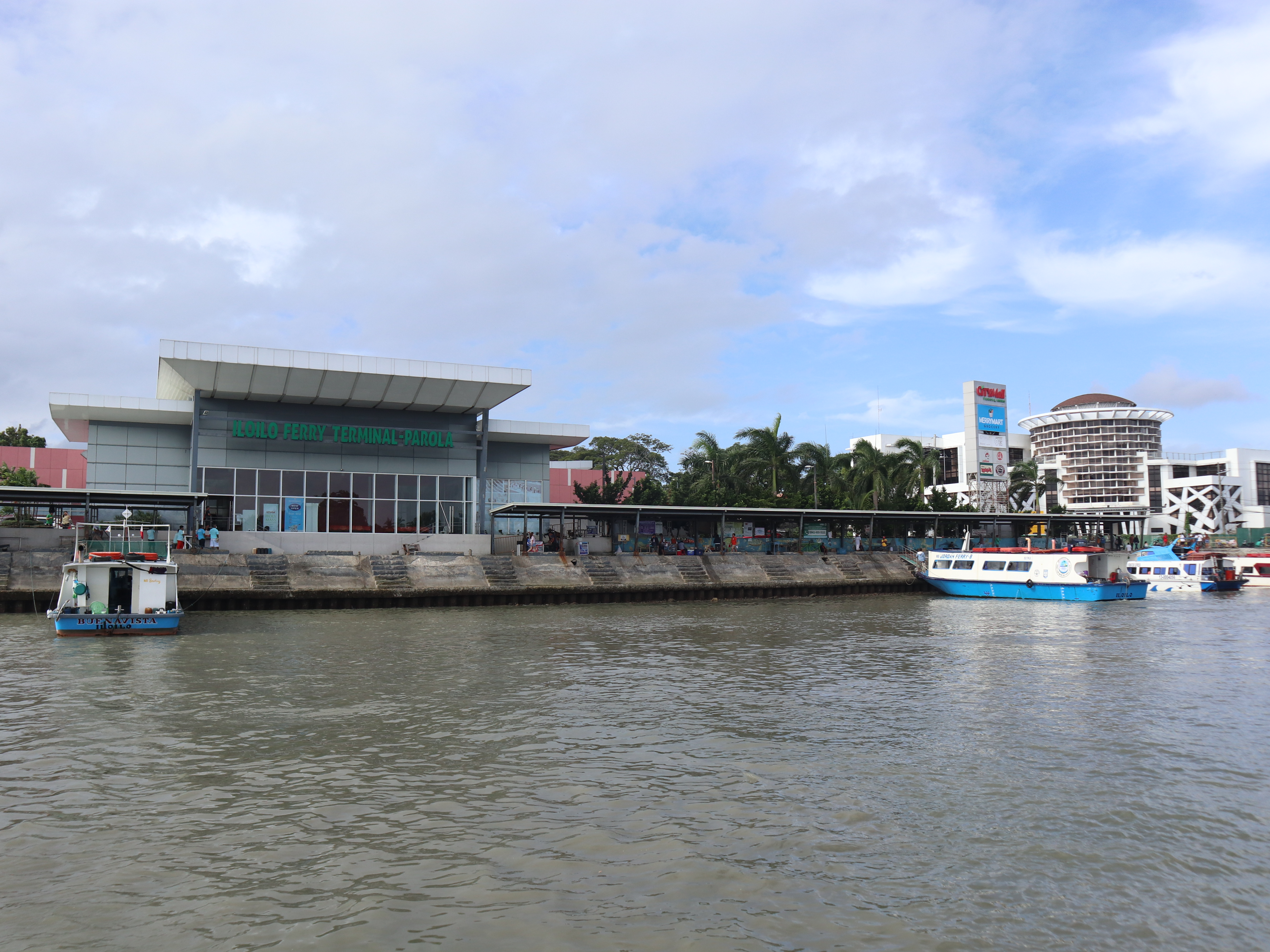
Guimaras-Iloilo Ferry Terminal in Parola

The Iloilo International Airport in Cabatuan, Iloilo, is the primary airport serving the district of Iloilo City Proper, as well as the whole Metro Iloilo–Guimaras. It serves domestic air routes to Manila, Clark, Cebu, Cuyo Island, Puerto Princesa, Sipalay, Cagayan de Oro, General Santos, and Davao City. It is also served by international routes to and from Singapore and Hong Kong.

The Port of Iloilo, which is located near Fort San Pedro, Iloilo City Proper, serves domestic shipping and cargo routes to/from Manila, Cebu, Puerto Princesa, Bacolod, Cagayan de Oro, Zamboanga City, Davao, and General Santos. The Iloilo International Cargo Port, in the adjacent Lapuz district, is a port of call for foreign cargo vessels.

The Guimaras-Iloilo Ferry Terminal, which is located in Parola, serves ferry routes to Jordan and Buenavista in Guimaras, and vice versa.

== Gallery ==
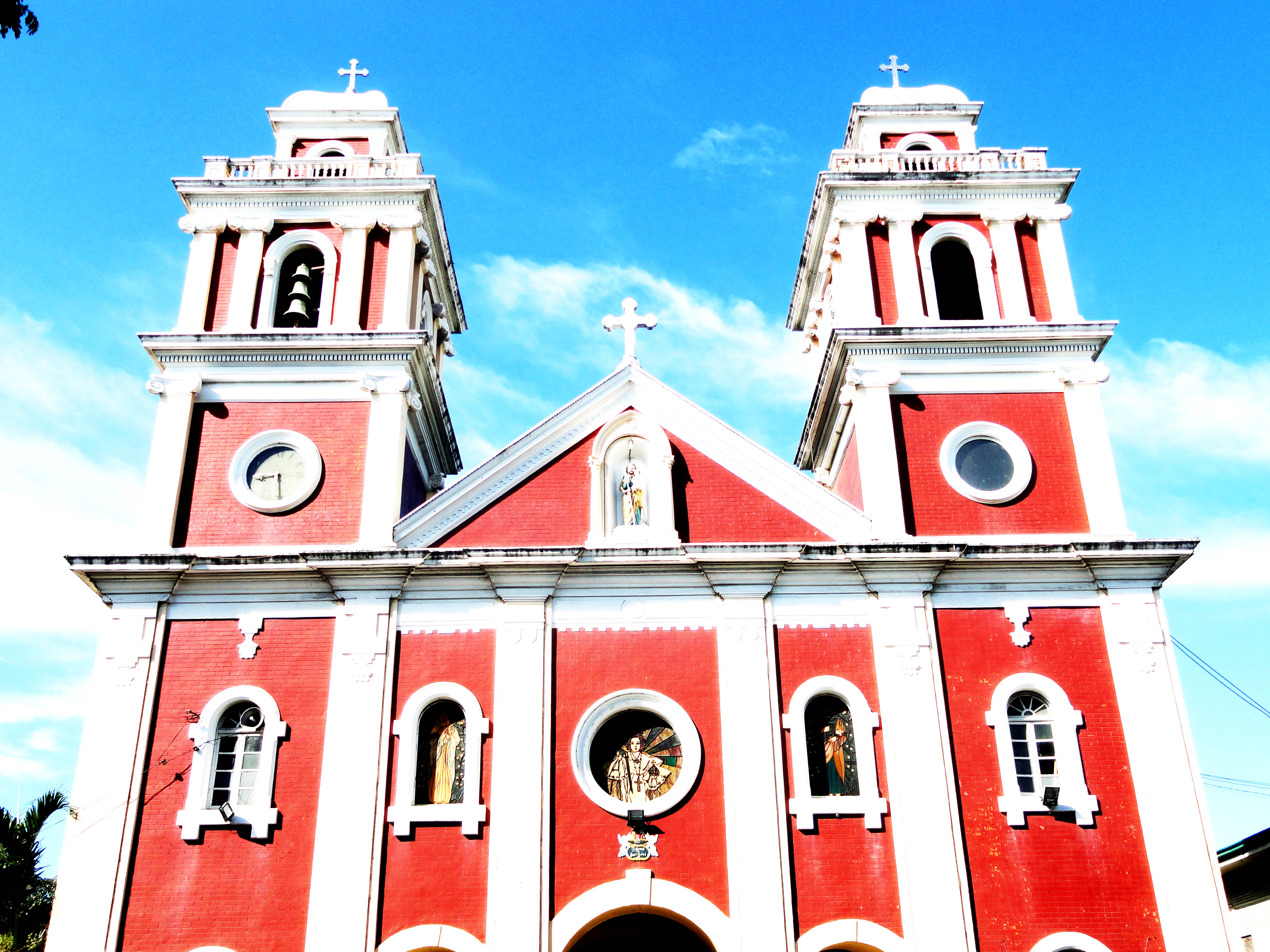
San José de Placer Church, the first ever church in the city of Iloilo, and was built in 1607.

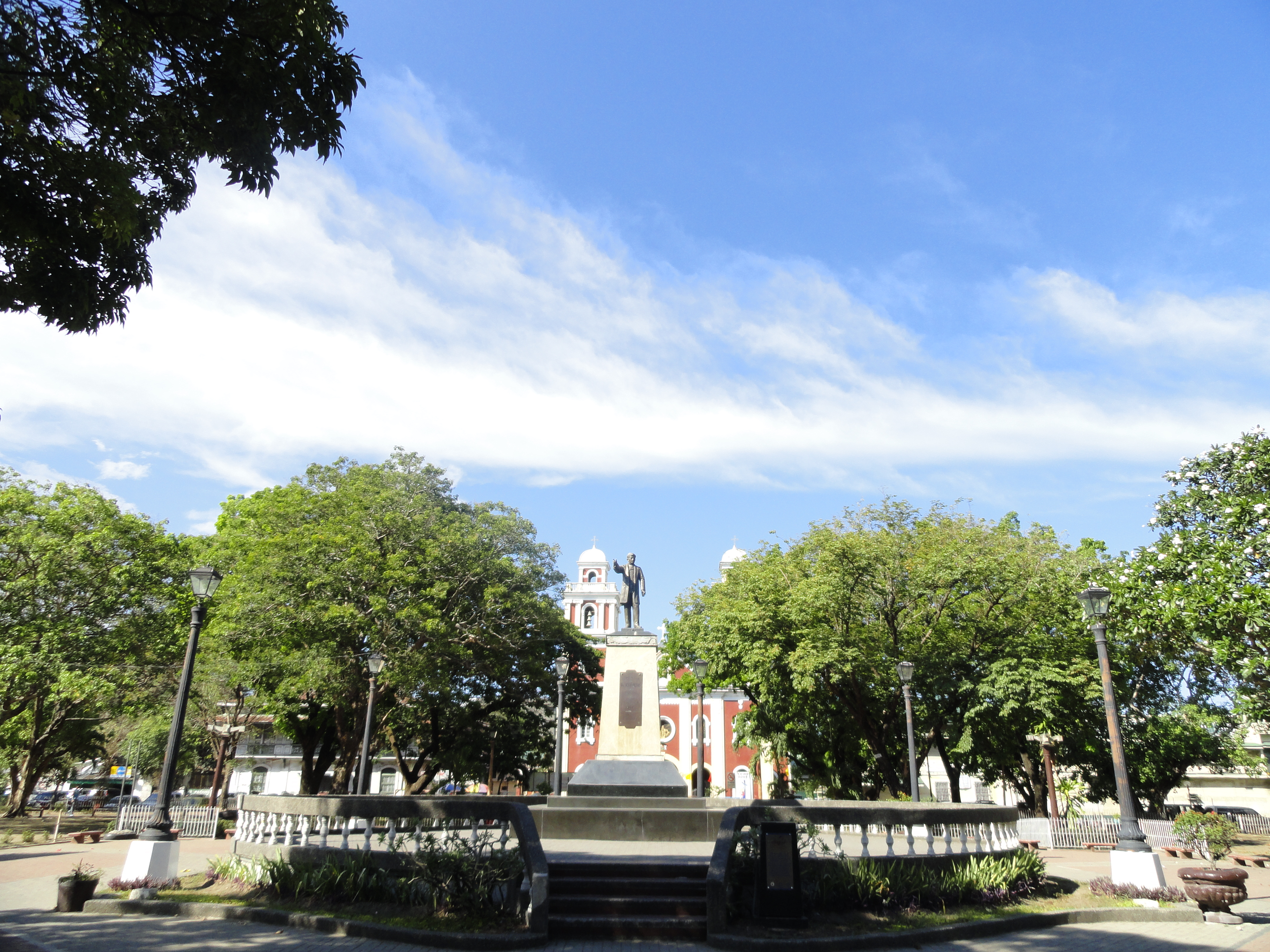
Plaza Libertad, a historic plaza where the flag of the first Philippine Republic was raised.

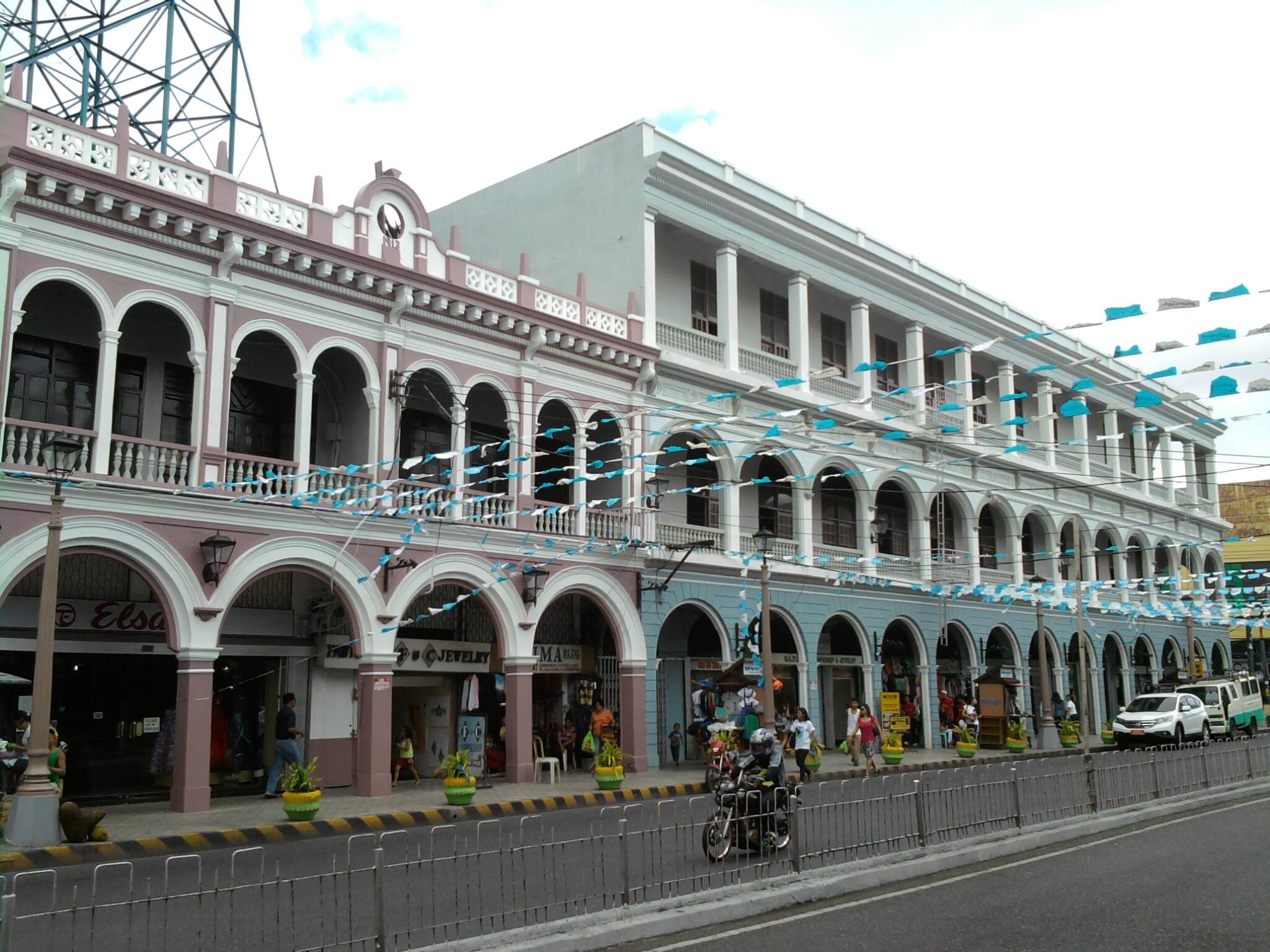
Calle Real, a historical street, contains several fine neoclassical, beaux-arts, and art-deco buildings.

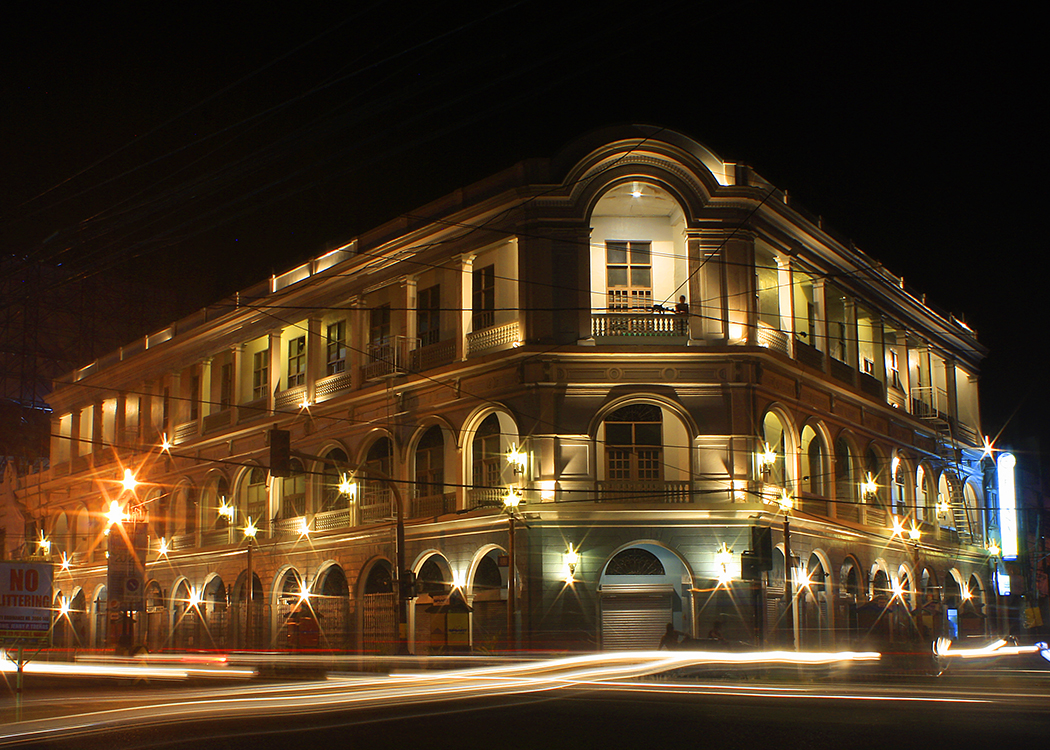
Eusebio Villanueva Building, once known as the International Hotel, located along Calle Real.

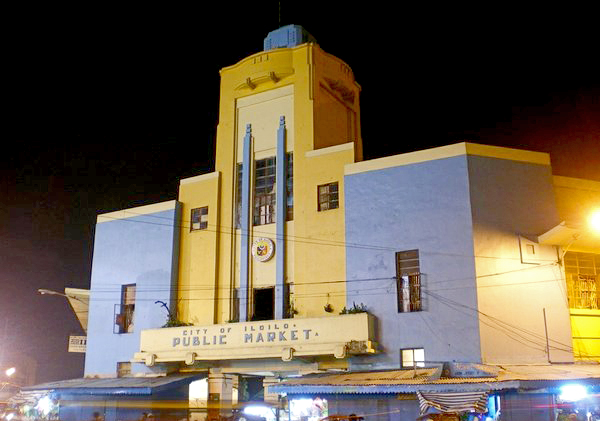
Iloilo Central Market, an art-deco public market, built during the early 20th century.

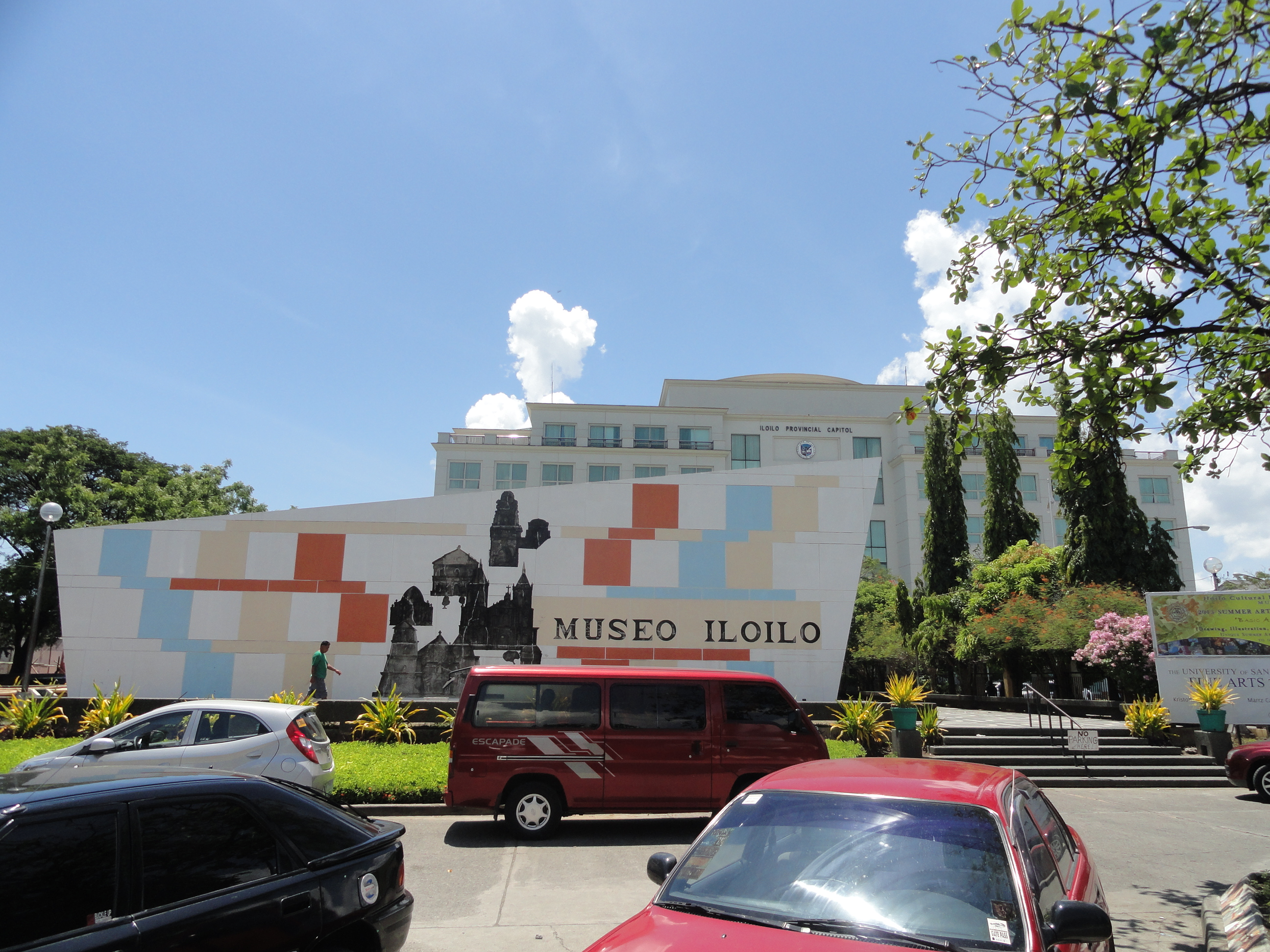
Museo Iloilo, a museum that houses the city and province of Iloilo's cultural heritage.

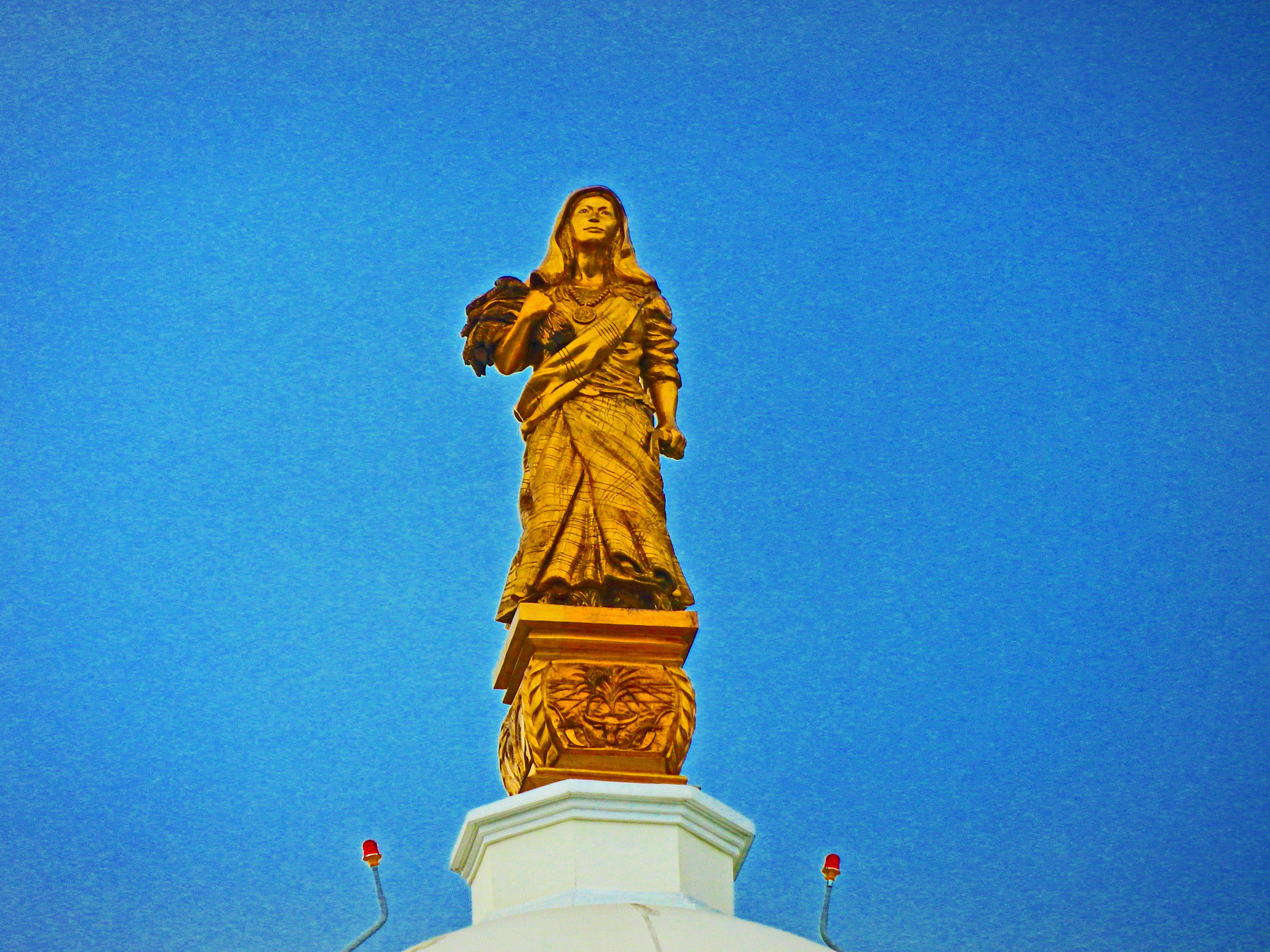
Lin-ay sang Iloilo (Lady of Iloilo), an 18-foot bronze statue on top of Iloilo City Hall's dome.

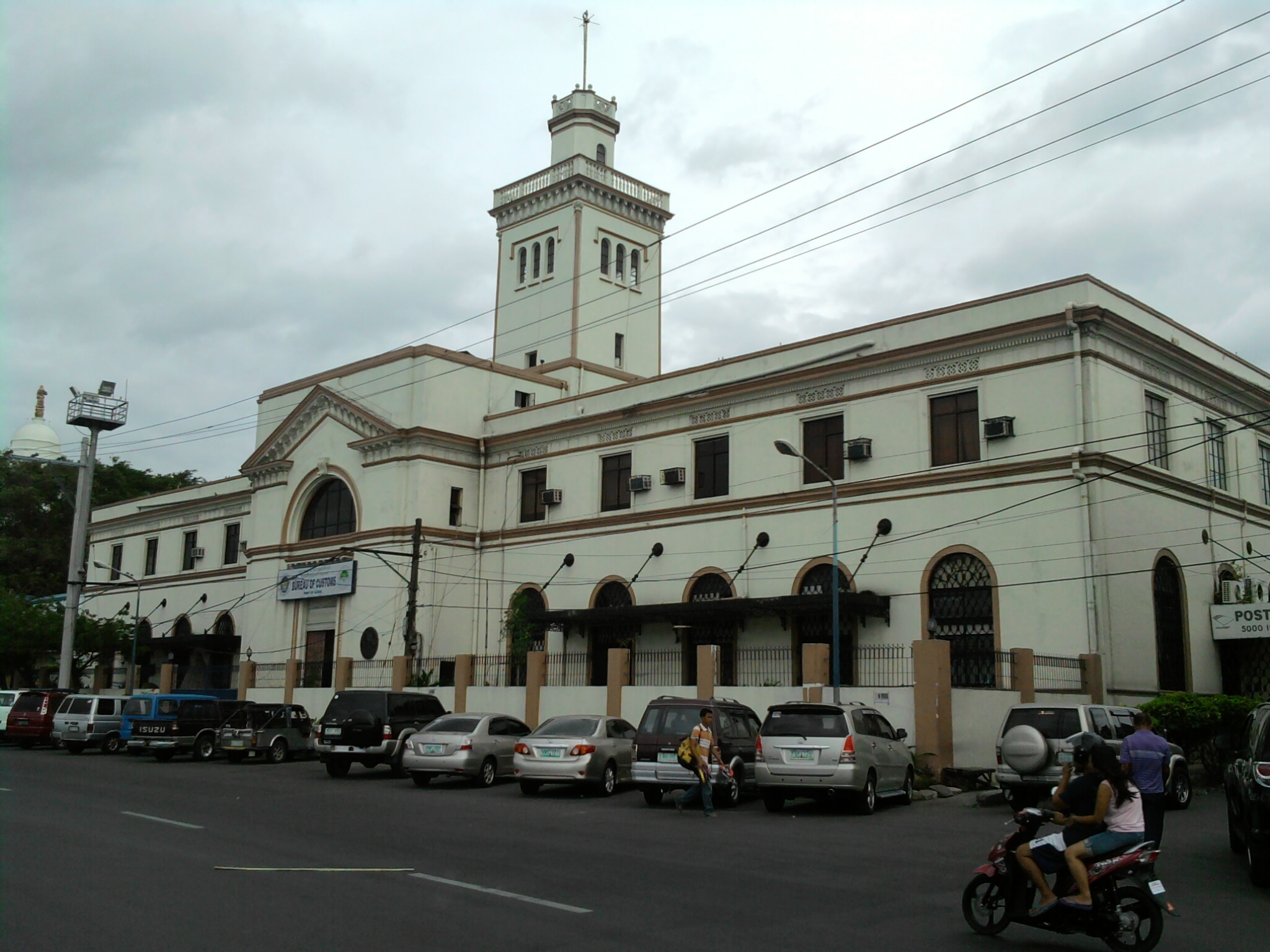
Aduana de Iloilo (Iloilo Customs House), one of the three customs houses in the Philippines.

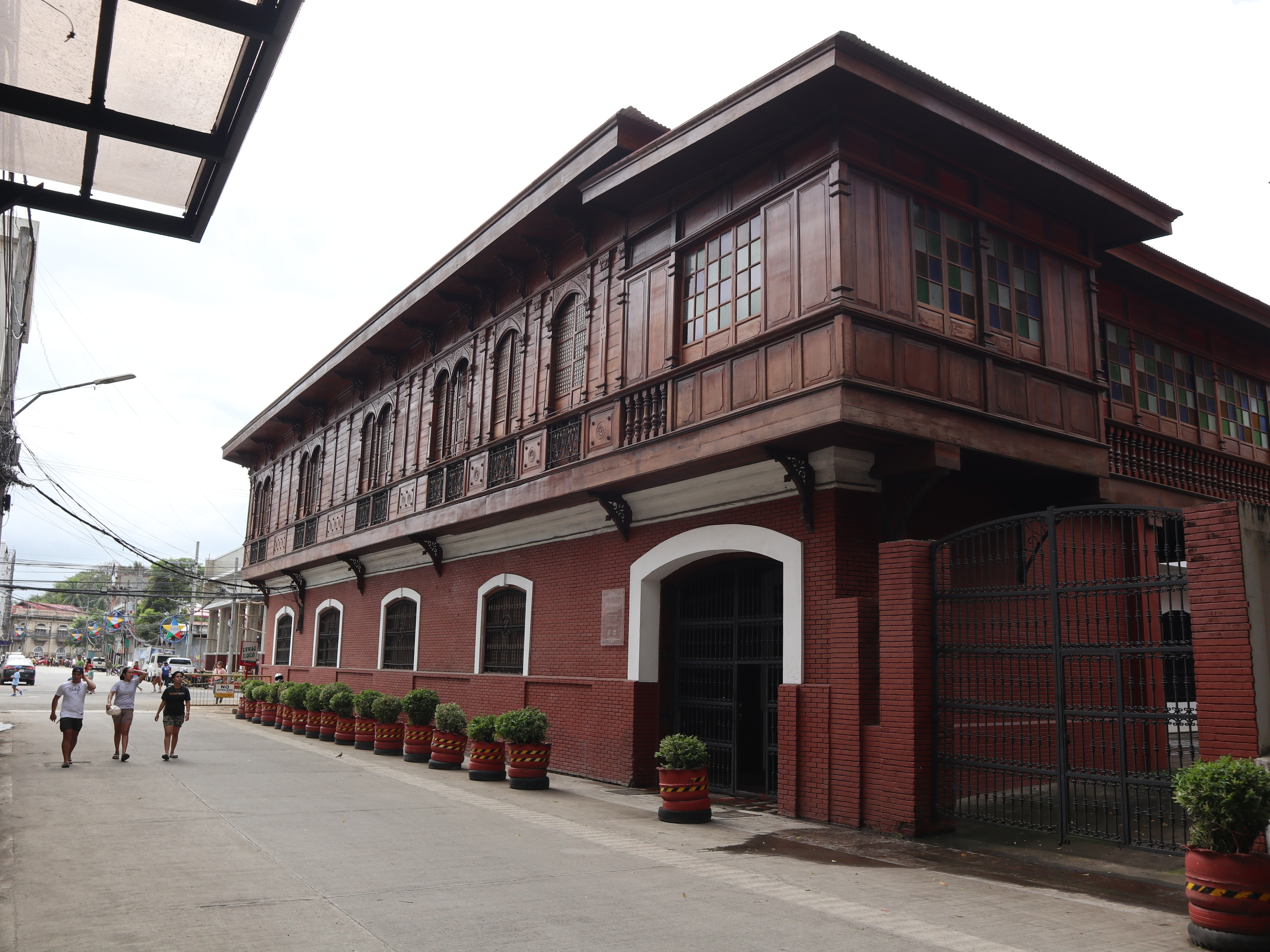
Edificio de Elizalde y Cia, a hundred-year-old structure that now houses the Museum of Philippine Economic History.

== See also ==
- Calle Real
- Dinagyang Festival
- Iloilo City
