= Hoskyn's Department Store =

First department store in the Philippines

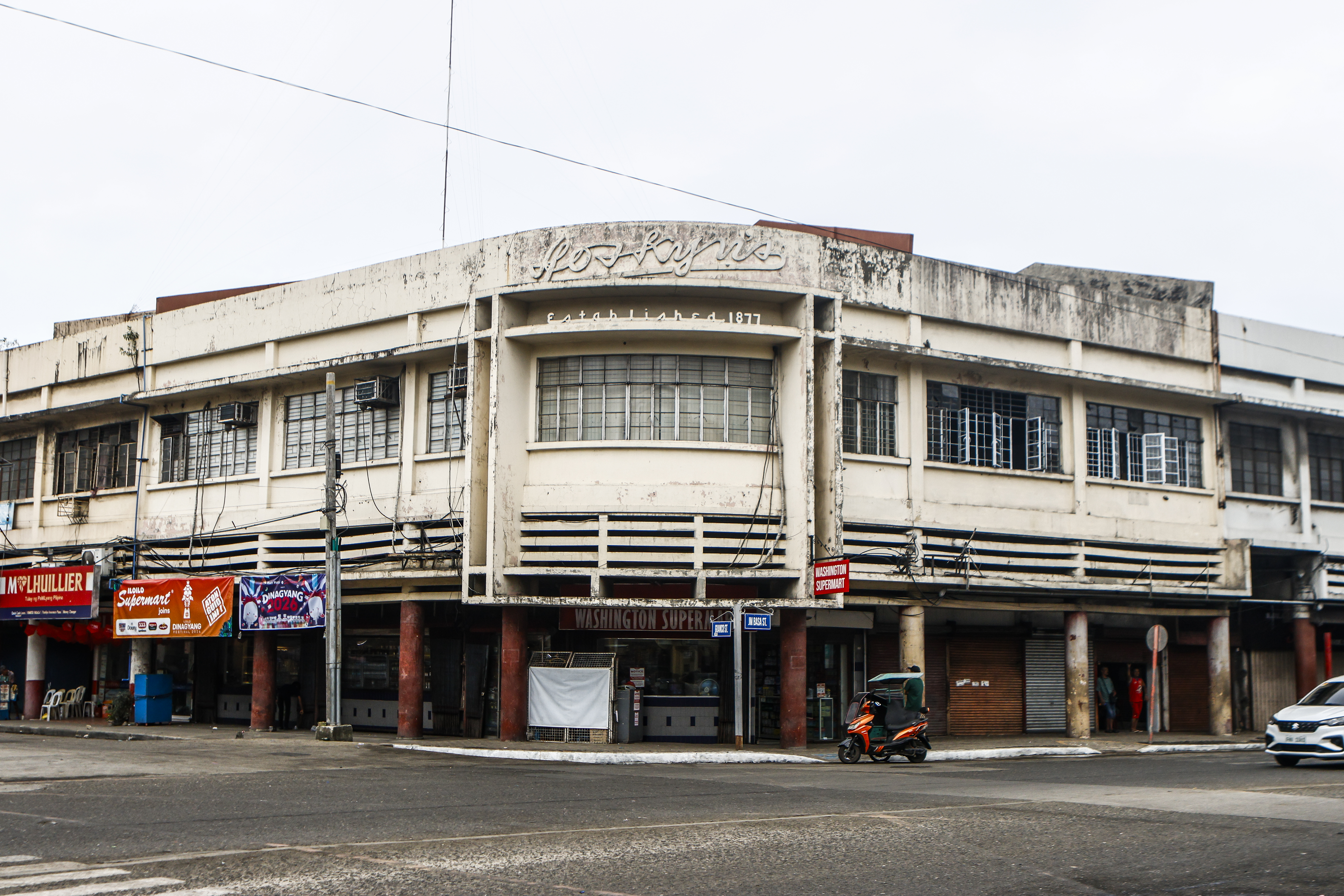
- Hoskyn's Building in 2026
- Industry: Department store
- Founded: 1877; 149 years ago in Iloilo City, Philippines
- Founder: Henry Hoskyn
- Defunct: 1948
- Successor: Washington Supermart
- Owner: Hoskyn & Co.

Hoskyn's Department Store was the first department store in the Philippines, established in 1877 in Iloilo City. It was also the first to introduce the "fixed price" policy in merchandising in the country, offering a wide range of products including groceries, hardware, stationery, toys, watches, jewelry, machinery, buttons, and threads, among others.

The department store was succeeded by Washington Supermart in 1948, and is located at the Hoskyn's Building on the corner of historic Calle Real and Guanco Street in downtown Iloilo City Proper.

== History ==
Hoskyn's Department Store was founded by Henry Hoskyn, a former employee of the firm Smith, Bell and Company based in Manila and nephew of Nicholas Loney, a British vice-consul in Iloilo. It was also managed by J. C. Hoskyn, Herbert Peter Hoskyn, George Medhurst Saul, A. Ponce de Leon, E. Garcia, and Gregorio Manuel Loring Sr., Loring was the son of Wright Boott Loring of Boston, the first American vice consul in Iloilo. The entrance of Hoskyn's Compound in the area bears the name "Galerias de Comercio Loring" in his honor. By 1925, Hoskyn & Co. was incorporated.

After World War II in 1948, the Que Family acquired the company, and renovated and reconstructed the Hoskyn's Building, where the department store was located, on a larger scale. Hoskyn's Department Store was replaced by Washington Commercial, becoming the Que Family's second store after the Washington Grocery on Iznart Street. Subsequently, it was later renamed Washington Supermart. In its succeeding branches, it became known as Iloilo Supermart and grew to become the largest supermarket chain in Western Visayas.
