= 1966 Iloilo City fire =

Fire in Iloilo City, Philippines

- Date: February 7, 1966
- Time: Approximately 1:30 p.m. – 1:30 a.m. PST (UTC+08:00)
- Duration: 12 hours
- Location: Iloilo City Proper, Iloilo City, Philippines; 10.6962°N 122.5678°E
- Type: Fire
- Property damage: ₱50 million (approx. ₱5 billion in today's value)

A fire in Iloilo City on February 7, 1966 destroyed nearly three quarters of the City Proper area, the central business district of Iloilo City, in the Philippines. It is the single most devastating fire in the city's history.

== Fire ==
The fire began around 1:30 pm at a lumberyard on Iznart Street then spread across Quezon and Valeria streets. Fanned by a strong wind, the blaze gutted at least 12 blocks of commercial and residential establishments along Texas Street on the north side, Rizal Street on the south, Jalandoni Street on the west and Arroyo Street on the east. The fire trucks of the government, the now-Bureau of Fire Protection, were ill-equipped to fight the fire because they had to travel 3 kilometres (1.9 mi) to Jaro, Iloilo City to fill their water tanks. The fire lasted approximately 12 hours and ₱50 million (1966 value) worth of property went up in smoke.

== Aftermath ==
After the fire, commercial activity returned to the area with many of surviving concrete commercial buildings being rebuilt, but the area was left with fewer residents since many homes were replaced by commercial structures. Some survivors were relocated to the district of La Paz in Iloilo City.

Among the commercial buildings impacted was the Majestic Theater, which was rebuilt. New commercial landmarks constructed include the Marymart Center, a shopping mall, and the new Iloilo branch of the Philippine National Bank.

In the aftermath of the fire, the Iloilo Filipino Chinese Fire Prevention Association Incorporated was established. It is now known as Federation Iloilo Volunteer Fire Brigade. It is one of the two private volunteer fire departments, though they include some part-time on-call firefighters.
