= Assumption Iloilo =

Roman Catholic school in Iloilo City, Philippines

- Motto: Assomption sans frontières (French)
- Motto in English: Assumption Without Borders
- Type: Private Catholic, college preparatory school
- Established: 1910
- Founders: Religious of the Assumption
- Religious affiliation: Roman Catholic ( Assumption Sisters)
- Principal: Sr.Anna Carmela Pesongco, RA
- Location: 18 Gen. Luna St., Iloilo City, Iloilo, Philippines; 10°42′09″N 122°33′56″E
- Colors: Gold - White - Blue
- Website: assumptioniloilo.edu.ph

Assumption Iloilo (also known as AC or Assumption Convent) is a private Catholic coeducational basic education institution run by the Sisters of the Religious of the Assumption in Iloilo City, Philippines. It was founded by the Assumption Sisters in 1910. It offers preschool, grade school, and high school education for males and females.

== History ==
The Sisters of the Religious of the Assumption first came to the Philippines in 1892 at the request of Queen Maria Cristina of Spain. They established the Superior Normal School for Women Teachers in 1893, one of the first schools for women in the Philippines. However, with the end of the Spanish colonial rule over the Philippines in 1898, the school eventually closed and the Sisters returned to Spain.

In 1904, the Sisters returned to the Philippines at the request of the Apostolic Delegate to the Philippines to Pope Pius X. They reestablished several schools, among them was the Assumption College San Lorenzo and Assumption Iloilo in 1910. It was established at General Hughes Street, Iloilo City at the request of the then Bishop of Jaro, Cardinal Dennis Joseph Dougherty. It was moved to its current location three years later.

In 1946, the Bureau of Private Schools accorded full recognition to the secondary and elementary education offered by the school, after it had re-applied for the Bureau accreditation at the end of the war.

The College Department was opened in 1948–1949, starting with One-Year Secretarial Course, to which were gradually added Liberal Arts, Bachelor of Science in Education and Bachelor of Science in commerce. Alongside these academic degrees, the college was authorized by the archdiocese to give Catechist Diplomas to students who had taught catechism whether in Sunday School or in the public schools during their years with the school.

In 1961, pre-elementary and elementary departments started to accept boys up to Grade III. By 1946, there were boys up to Grade VI. Since then, the Preschool and Grade School Departments included boys.

In 2011, boys were admitted by the high-school and senior-high school departments up to Grade XII.

Desirous of further academic competence which would enable its graduates to meet more functionally the demands of a technologically geared world, the High School Department began working for accreditation by the Philippine Accrediting Association of Schools, Colleges and Universities (PAASCU) in 1970. After a period of intensive efforts to attain PAASCU requirements, the High School Department was granted accreditation status in 1972 and permanent membership in 1975.

In line with the spirit of Vatican II, and in response to the call of the Church in the Second Plenary Council of the Philippines and the needs of the country, the Assumption in the Philippines has moved towards the rural areas and the underprivileged sector, without abandoning the education of the upper/middle class. The majority of its schools, campus ministries and community development works are now among farmers, indigenous people, and the urban poor.

Through formal and non-formal education, Assumption seeks to decrease the gap between the aristocracy and the peasantry and works for the young nobles, the kingdom, and the power so that all may be leaven and agents of Christian social change.

== School program ==
Assumption Iloilo offers Preschool and Elementary education (Grades 1 to 6) for both boys and girls. The Secondary education of the school offers (Grades 7 to 10). It was once exclusive for females, but has been opened to male enrollment in 2011.

Transferees

Assumption-Iloilo will accept transferees on the basis of requirements presented, test

results and interview. Transferees may be admitted to the Elementary (Grades 1 – 4 only) and High School (Grades 7 - 8 only) provided they submit satisfactory evidence of good conduct and

good academic standing from their former school and fulfill all prerequisites.

== See also ==
- Religious of the Assumption
