= Iloilo Sun Yat Sen High School =

Private Chinese school in Iloilo City, Philippines

Sun Yat Sen High School of Iloilo, Inc.
- 菲律濱怡朗中山中學
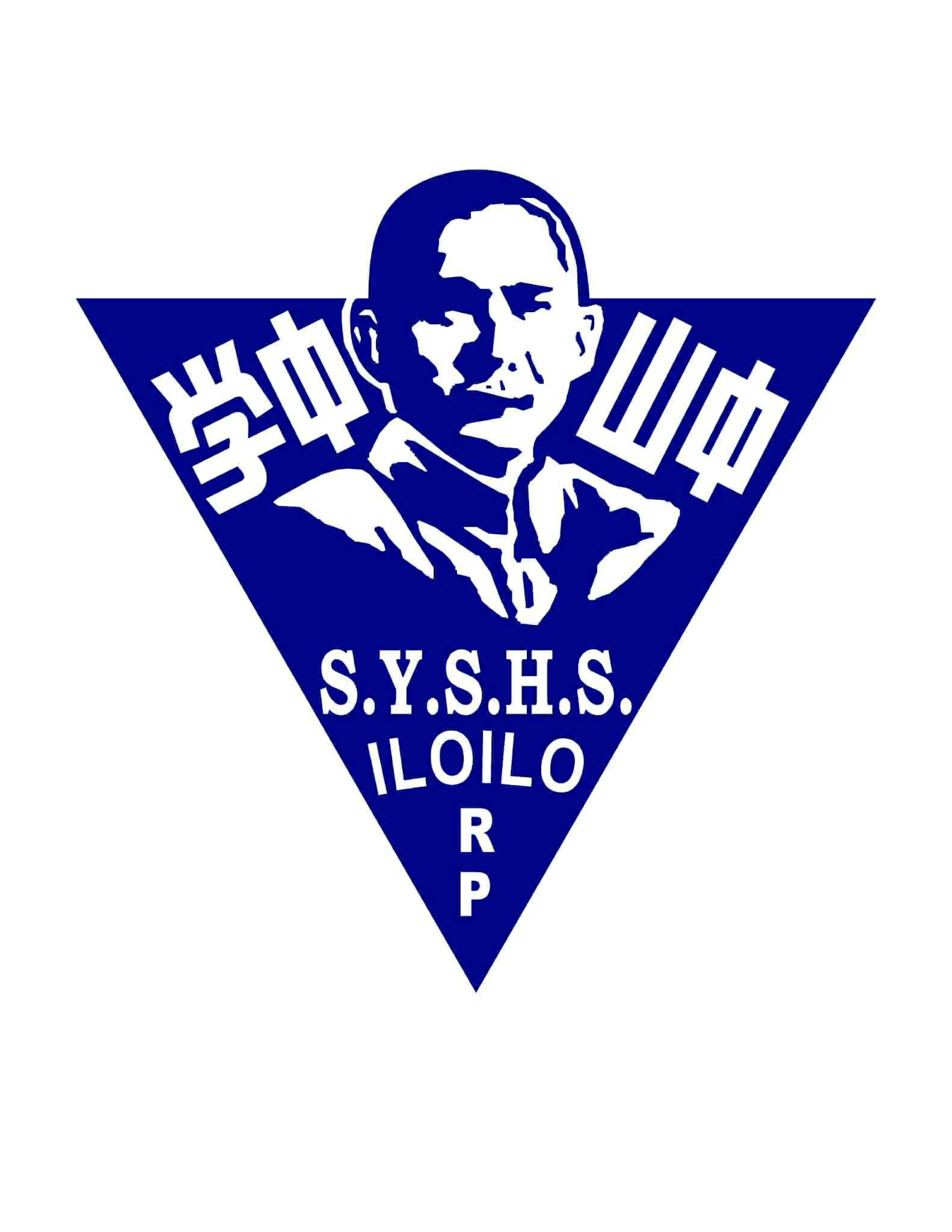

Location
- Iloilo City, Iloilo; Philippines
- Coordinates: 10°41′35″N 122°34′16″E

Information
- Type: Private, Chinese, Filipino-Chinese, Filipino
- Established: November 12, 1925
- Chairman: Mr. Eddy Yulo Ong
- Principal: Dr. Norivi Lorca
- Grades: Pre-nursery to Kinder 2, Grades 1 to 12
- Mascot: Blue Lions
- Affiliations: Federation of Filipino Chinese Chamber of Commerce of Panay, Inc.
- Hymn: Iloilo Sun Yat Sen High School Hymn
- Website: Tiongsan Website

The Sun Yat Sen High School of Iloilo, Inc. (traditional Chinese: 菲律濱怡朗中山中學; simplified Chinese: 菲律滨怡朗中山中学; pinyin: Fēilǜbīn Yílǎng Zhōngshān Zhōngxué; Pe̍h-ōe-jī: Hui-li̍p-pin Î-lóng Tiong-san Tiong-o̍h) (known as “Tiong San” by its alumni and the Chinese-Filipino Ilonggo community) is a private, Chinese preparatory school at Mapa St., Iloilo City administered by its board of trustees. Its programs are in Chinese and English. Filipino subjects and subjects required by the Department of Education of the Philippines are categorized under the English subjects.

== History ==
=== Background ===
Sun Yat-sen was born on November 12, 1866, into a farming peasant household in Choyhung in Kwangtung near the Portuguese colony of Macao. His early education established him as a man of two worlds: China and the West. After a basic training in the Chinese classics in his village school, he was sent to Hawaii in 1879 to join his older brother. There he enrolled in a college where he studied Western science and Christianity. Dr. Sun Yat-sen, the father of the Republic of China, died in Beijing in 1925.

Members of the Filipino-Cantonese Chinese community in Iloilo City founded Sun Yat Sen School on November 12, 1925, to honor Sun Yat Sen.

=== Early years ===
In the beginning, there were 28 students. They used the Cantonese Club building as temporary classroom. In 1929, a lot with an area of 1,096 sq. meters was bought by the Board of Trustees of Cantonese Club members of Iloilo City. A two-storey building was erected to house more than 130 students. Another two-storey building was built in 1938. These are the collaborated effort of the Cantonese people in Iloilo City.

The High School department was established in 1939. A science laboratory was put up. Students now numbered more than 300. The school closed when the Japanese invaded the Philippines on December 8, 1941. The Allied forces liberated Panay island in March 1945. By May, SYSHS resumed classes with 370 students.

=== Post-war era ===
In 1946 student enrollment reached more than 500 resulting in a lack of classrooms. A three-storey building was constructed to house the high school students.

In the spring of 1949, student enrollment reached 670. By the request of the parents, a senior high school curriculum was added. The student population increased to more than 700. An auditorium was added.

In 1956, a lot of 1800 sq. m. opposite the school along Mapa Street was purchased by the Board of Trustees under the leadership of the Chinese Cantonese Club members of Iloilo City on Aldeguer Street. A two-storey wooden structure was erected to accommodate all the high school students. Iloilo Union Auto Supply owner, Tung Ah Hua, helped developed the project through the members of the Cantonese Club; the president during that time was Liu Chuk Tan. Liu Chuk Tan (Remegio Tse Wing Sr.) was from Thuay San, Guang Dong Province in Mainland China. He was the president of the Cantonese Club for eight years during the mid-1960s. His secretary was Chiu Yet.

In 1973, a four-storey building was constructed on the same lot to accommodate more than 1000 students. Another imposing four-storey building with an auditorium was inaugurated on the 60th year foundation of the school in 1985. At this time Kuo Ching Yuan, who was the principal for almost 50 years, retired.

=== 1980s ===
SYSHS was champion in several PRISAA and national sports meets.

In 1962, SYSHS placed first among all private and public schools in Western Visayas and 14th place nationwide in the national government examination for high school graduating students. In the 2000 NSAT examination, SYSHS placed second in Western Visayas and 19th place nationwide.

=== 1990s ===
Juanito "Tarzan" Lee Sio (SIO SUY LIONG) was elected Chairman of the Board in 1994, but died of illness on February 15, 1994.

=== 2000s ===
Upon assumption of office in 2004, the chairman emeritus, Robert Chua, initiated a major renovation of Tiong San for the school's 80th foundation anniversary.

In 2005, the school had qualified in the GASTPE/FAPE-ESC, a scholarship grant by the government to the private schools to slow the exodus of students from private schools to public ones. Tiong San got an overall rating of above standard for its facilities, equipment, faculty and staff.

With donations, in the school year 2009–2010 a bridge connecting the two four-story buildings across Mapa Street was constructed.

=== 2010s ===
For the school year 2010–2011, Victorio S. Lo, acting principal until 2004, assumed the office again after Reynaldo S. Navarro finished his term.

== Administrators ==
- Chairman of the Board: Eddy Yulo Ong (since 2024)
- Alumni Association President: Engr. Fulbert Woo (since 2024)
- Principal: Norivee A. Lorca (since 2024)

== School seal and logo ==
The seal is a blue inverted equilateral triangle with the face of Dr. Sun Yat-sen placed on top. The words on the seal are marked with a white color.

The triangle bears the name “中山中學” which is the school's name in Chinese. The initials "S.Y.S.H.S." (Sun Yat Sen High School) are at the bottom, with "ILOILO" forming an arch under it. Near the corner of the triangle is a vertically displayed "RP" (Republic of the Philippines).
