= General Luna Street =

Street in Iloilo City, Philippines

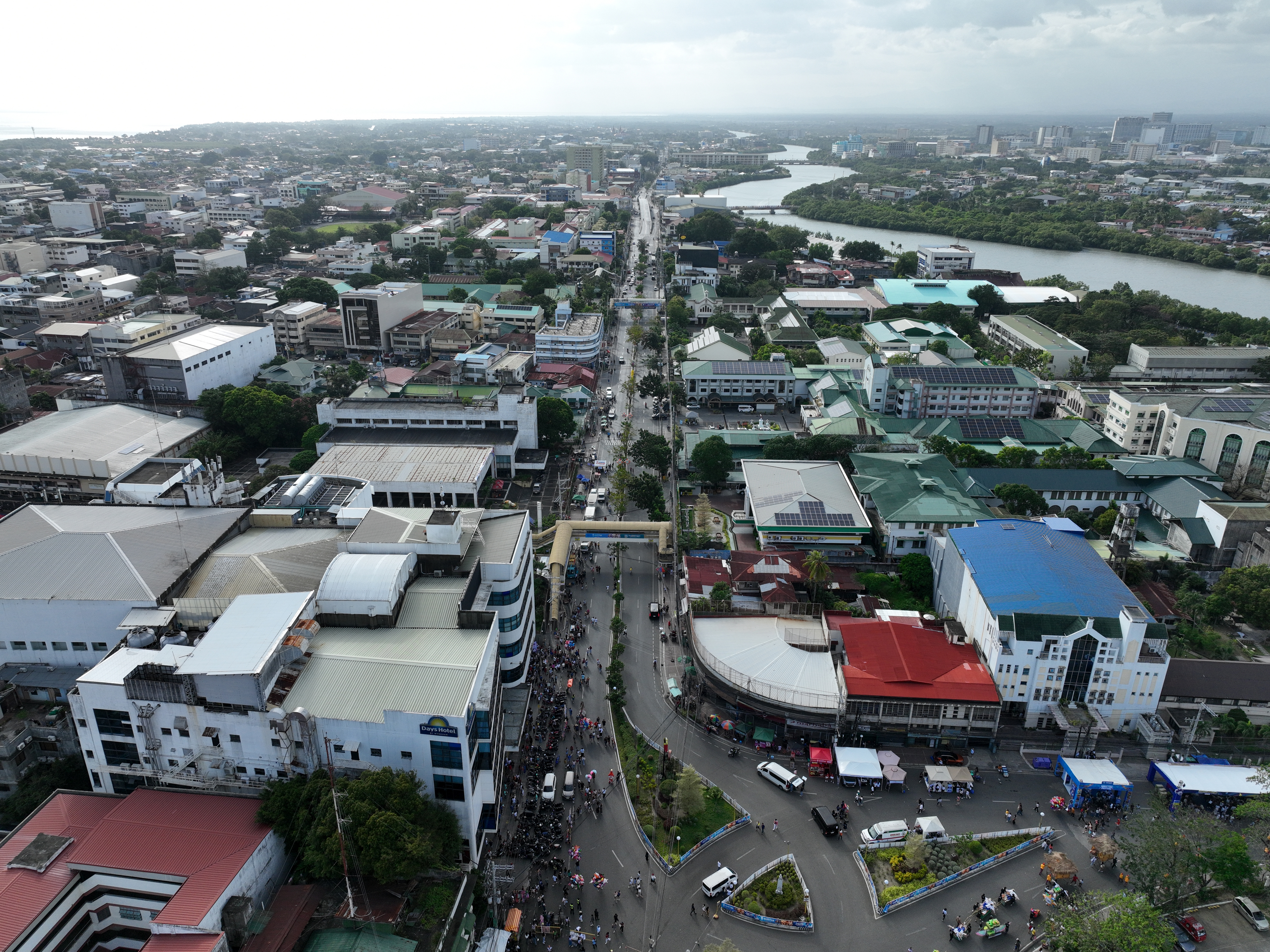
- Drone photo of General Luna Street looking west
- Interactive map of General Luna Street
- Namesake: Antonio Luna
- Length: 1.61 km (1.00 mi)
- Location: Iloilo City, Philippines
- East end: M.H. del Pilar Street in Molo
- Major junctions: Jalandoni Street; N5 (Bonifacio Drive)
- West end: Iznart Street in City Proper

General Luna Street is a major thoroughfare in Iloilo City Proper in Iloilo City, Philippines. It runs east–west, from the intersection of Aquino and Infante Avenues to the Iloilo Provincial Capitol, serving as one of the main thoroughfares connecting the district of Molo to Iloilo City Proper. The street is one of the busiest in Iloilo City, hosting several major institutions, including the University of the Philippines Visayas, University of San Agustin, St. Paul University Iloilo, Assumption Iloilo, and Iloilo Central Elementary School. The headquarters of Panay Electric Company and the Iloilo City Proper Police Station are also located along the street. General Luna Street is named after General Antonio Luna, a Filipino revolutionary leader.

== History ==
The road dates back to the 18th century during the Spanish colonial period. It originally connected the town of Iloilo (now Iloilo City Proper) in the east with the town of Molo in the west. During this time, the street was primarily used by calesas (horse-drawn carriages), caretelas (small carts), and occasionally caruajes (larger horse-drawn carts).

In 1921, under the American regime, major infrastructure projects and improvements were undertaken to accommodate motorized vehicles. This included upgrades to General Luna Street, which were further enhanced with the installation of street lights. Over time, the street has seen significant improvements in its infrastructure, leading to the growth of businesses in the area. Today, General Luna Street remains a key thoroughfare, serving as a main artery for commuters traveling from the central and southern towns of Iloilo. It is also home to many offices, the Iloilo City Proper Police Station, and other business and commercial establishments.
