= Museo Iloilo =

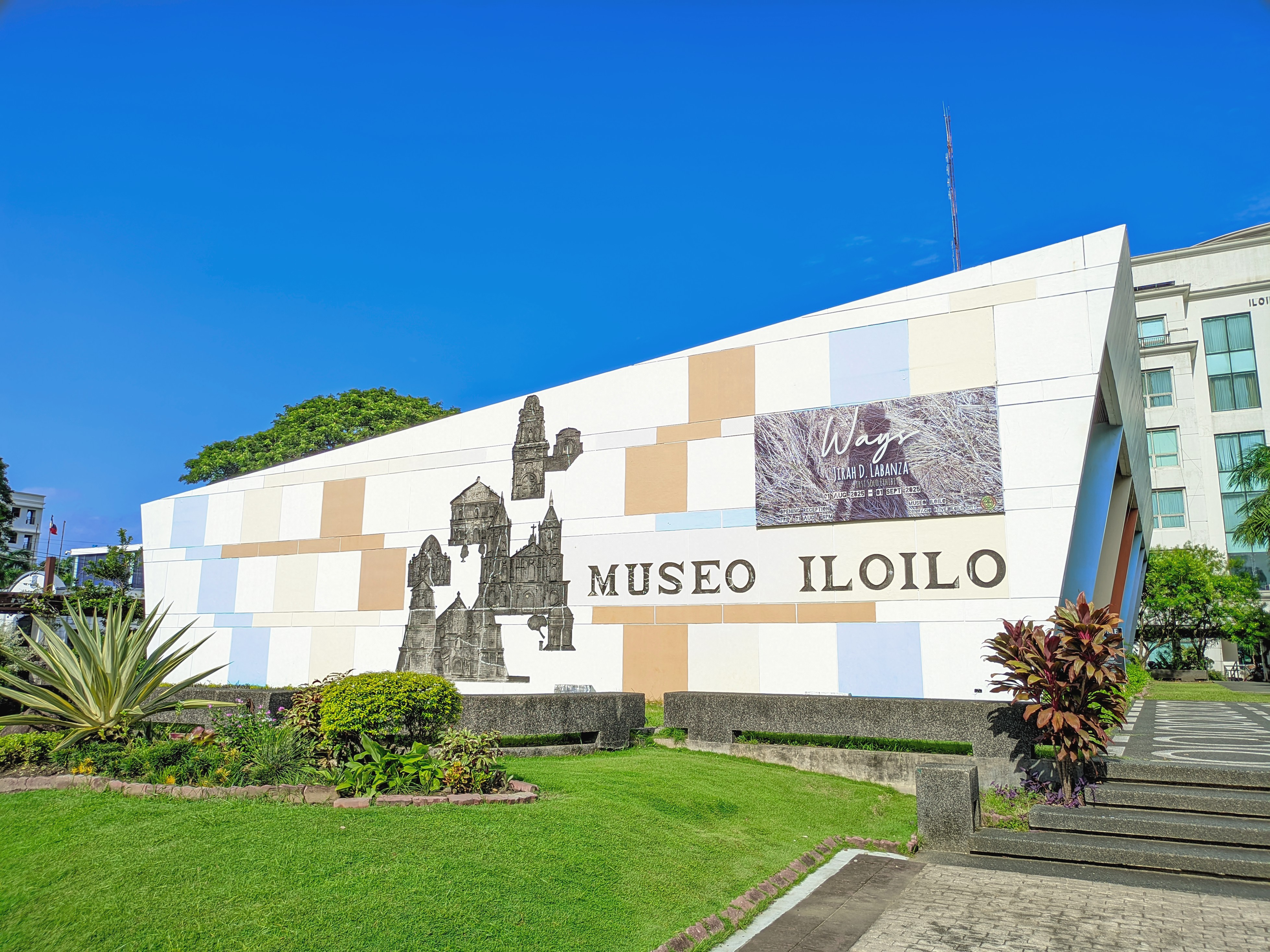
- Museo Iloilo with Iloilo Provincial Capitol in the background
- Former name: Chairman Handumanan Juan Pablo II Museo Iloilo
- Established: 1971
- Location: Iloilo Provincial Capitol Complex, Bonifacio Drive, Iloilo City, Philippines
- Coordinates: 10°42′10″N 122°34′07″E
- Type: Local museum
- Architect: Sergio Penasales

Museo Iloilo is a provincial museum located near the Iloilo Provincial Capitol in Iloilo City, Philippines. It is the first government-sponsored museum in the Philippines outside of Metro Manila. The museum houses a collection of Iloilo's cultural heritage.

Museo Iloilo was built in 1971 and was designed by architect Sergio Penasales.

== Exhibits ==
The museum's permanent exhibit covers cultural heritage of Iloilo and Panay from weaponries and armories during the Filipino-Spanish war in the 1800s, to stone-age potteries and traded potteries from China and Thailand, sculptures in the Spanish era, jars and ceramics during the Japanese invasion, fossils, and jewelries. Parts of a British sunken ship and war remnants are also good finds inside the museum. In addition, they have a selection of priceless cultural bits and pieces such as relics and modern religious images of saints and old churches depicting the unwavering religious spirit of the Hiligaynon people.

Since Iloilo has a number of baroque churches and the people are known to have a strong faith, the section of the museum also displays different sizes of religious figures. The image below is a late 18th-century high relief carving in hardwood, originally polychromed and showing traces of gesso. The relief depicts the conversion of San Agustin, a heretic, to Christianity. The scene shows the penitent convert before the crucified Christ with Sta. Monica, shown with a bare breast, probably recalling how she nourished her son with her milk.

Museo Iloilo Exhibits

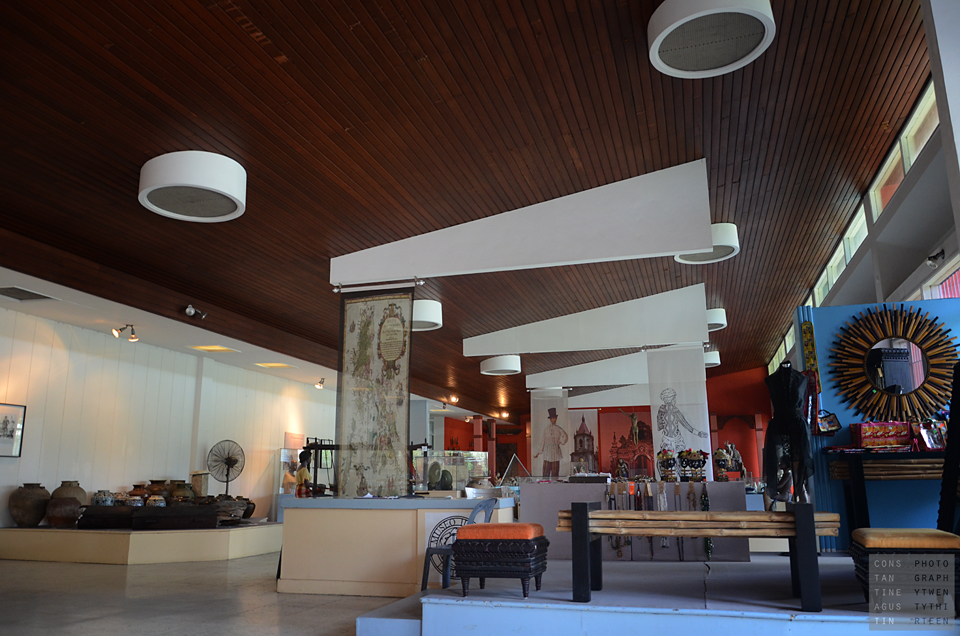
Inside the Museo Iloilo

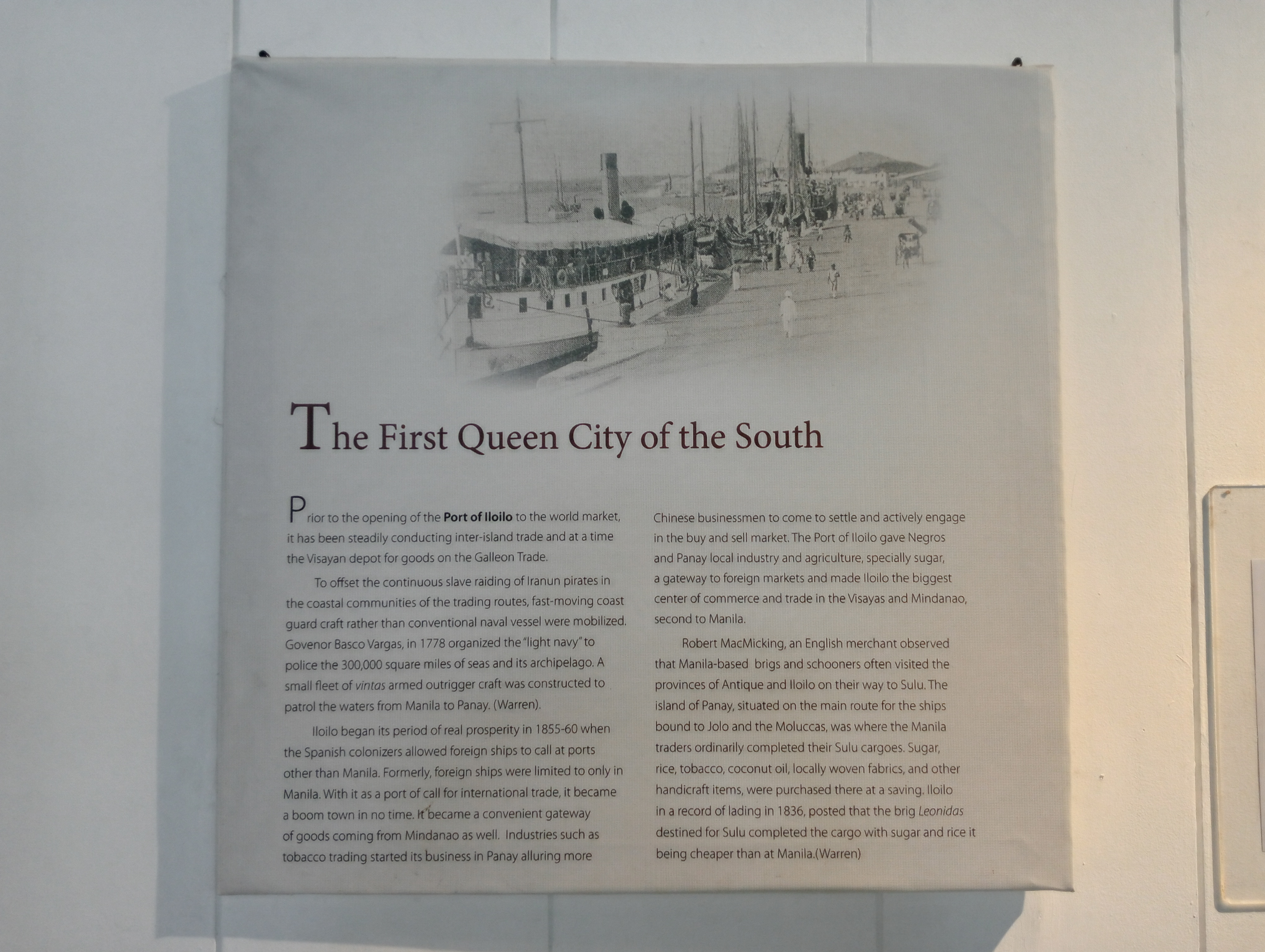
Didactic panel that explains Iloilo's history

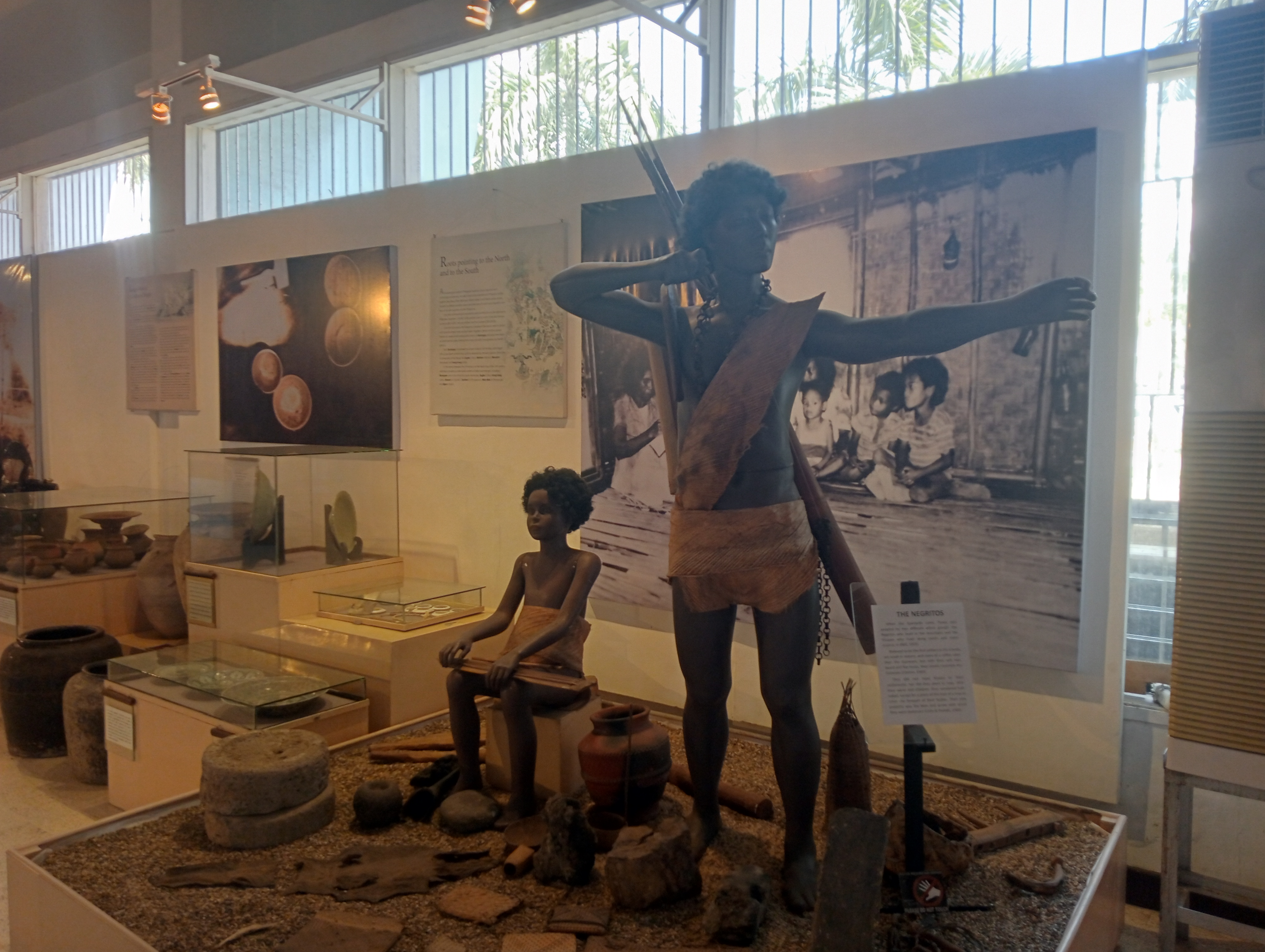
Statues of Ati people
