= Iloilo Freedom Grandstand =

Grandstand in Iloilo City, Philippines

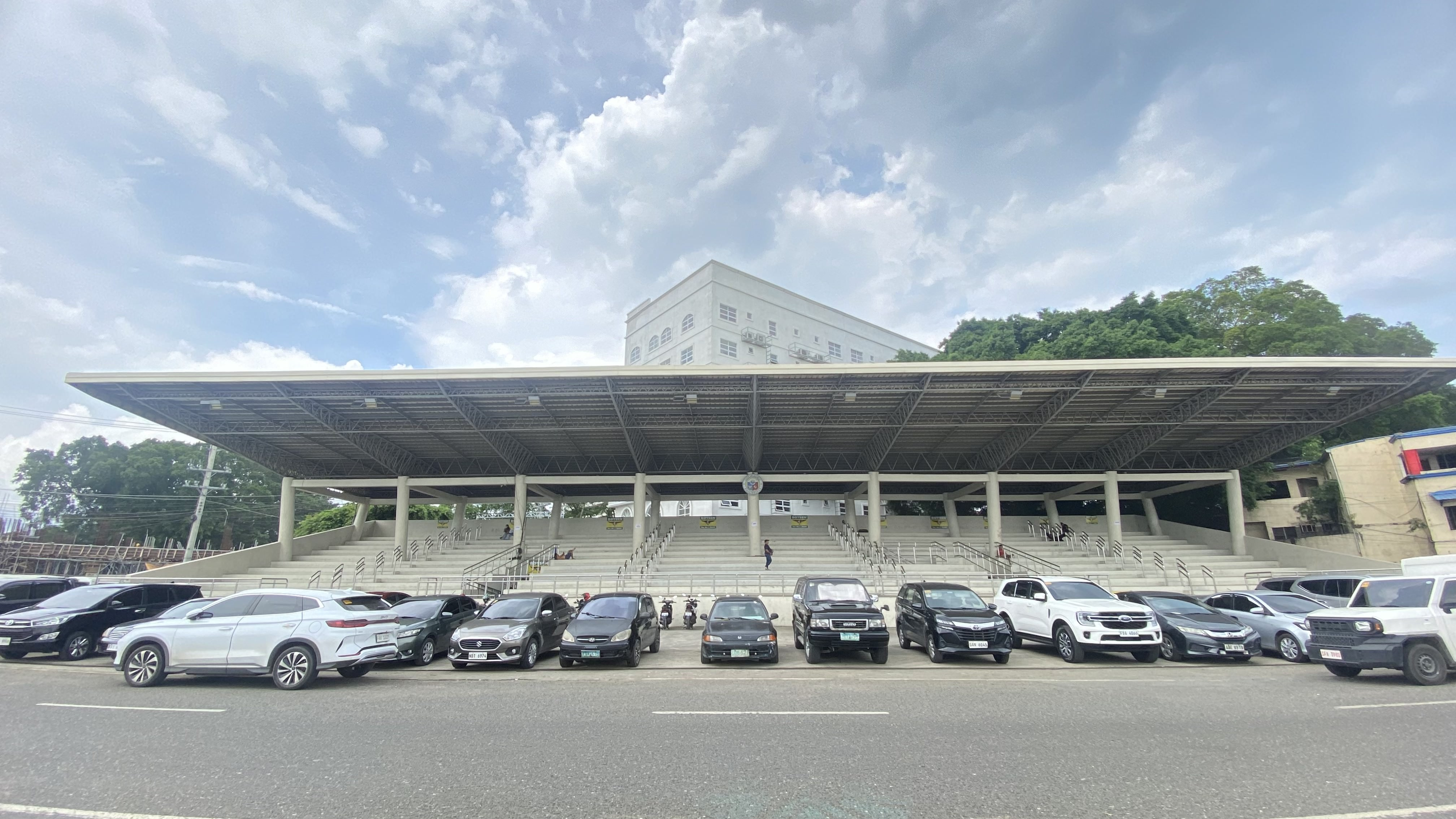
- The grandstand along Muelle Loney Street
- Interactive map of Iloilo Freedom Grandstand
- Location: Muelle Loney Street, City Proper, Iloilo City, Philippines
- Coordinates: 10°41′38.706″N 122°34′23.2464″E
- Capacity: 4,000

The Iloilo Freedom Grandstand is a grandstand located on Muelle Loney Street in Iloilo City Proper, Iloilo City, Philippines. It was built in 2018 as a replacement for the old grandstand with the same name located on Calle Real, which was demolished the same year as part of the revival project of Sunburst Park, where the grandstand used to be located.

The grandstand is a popular venue for the Dinagyang Festival, where the Ati Tribes Competition and the Kasadyahan Festival are mainly held.

== History ==
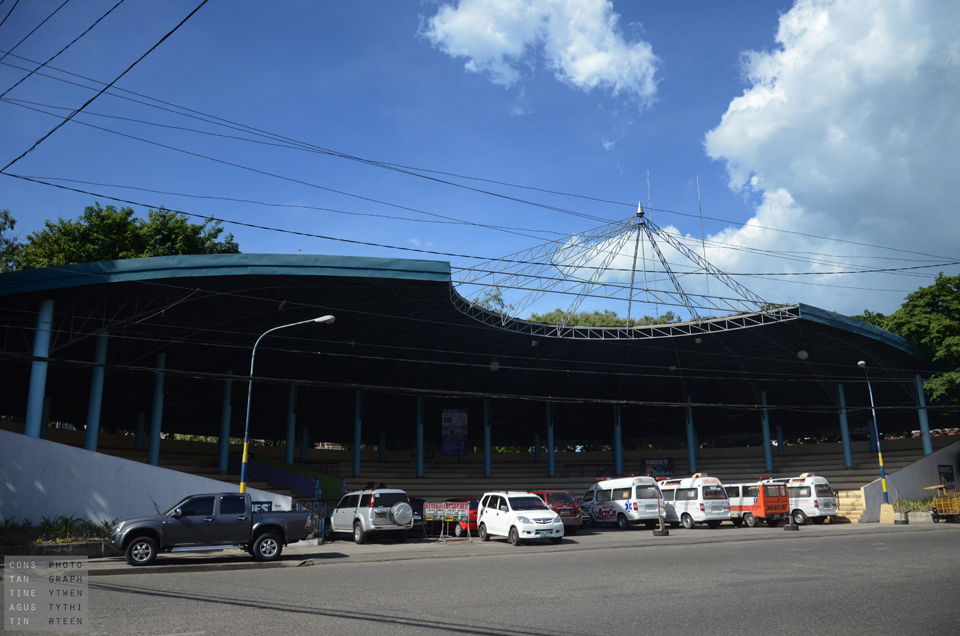
The old Freedom Grandstand on Calle Real, which was demolished for the revival of Sunburst Park.

The original grandstand was built in 1955 within Freedom Park (formerly known as Sunburst Park) by the first elective city mayor, Rodolfo Ganzon, as a concrete memorial to the new found political freedom of Iloilo City residents, which restored to the people of Arevalo, Jaro, La Paz, Mandurriao, Molo, and Iloilo City Proper their constitutional right to elect their own officials, which used to be appointed.

In 1992, during the administration of Mayor Mansing Malabor, the grandstand was renovated and expanded, increasing its seating capacity to 1,800. However, the renovation obstructed the view of the Iloilo Customs House located behind it. As a result, the other structures in Freedom Park, such as eateries and display booths, were demolished.

In 2018, the grandstand was relocated to Muelle Loney Street, where the Old Panay Railways Terminus once stood, overlooking the Iloilo River, while the old structure was demolished as part of the Sunburst Park revitalization project. The new grandstand, with more than twice the capacity of the original, was first used during the 2019 edition of the Dinagyang Festival.
