= Sunburst Park =

Park in Iloilo City

- Freedom Park
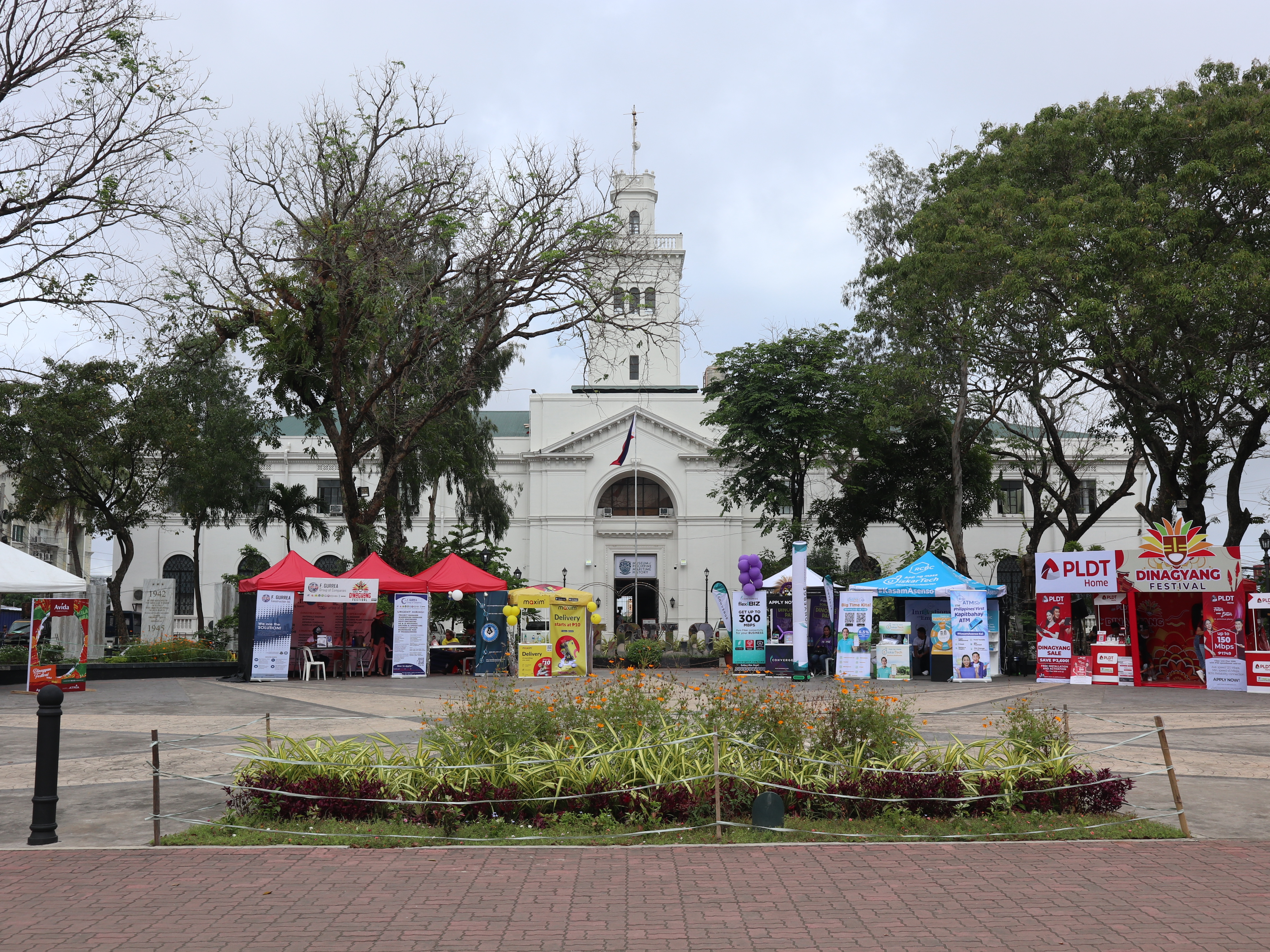
- Sunburst Park with the Iloilo Customs House in the background
- Interactive map of Sunburst Park
- Type: Urban Park
- Location: Iloilo City Proper, Philippines
- Coordinates: 10°41′38″N 122°34′19″E
- Area: 0.39 hectares (0.96 acres)
- Operator: Iloilo City Government

Sunburst Park, originally known as Plaza de Aduana, is a recreational park situated in front of the Iloilo Customs House on Calle Real in downtown Iloilo City, Philippines. The park is named in honor of the United States Army 40th Infantry "Sunburst" Division, which played a significant role in liberating Panay from Japanese forces during World War II. It has also been referred to as Freedom Park.

The park includes a walkway, a chess playground, benches for visitors, a parking area, a statue of Macario Peralta, and a designated Sunburst area.

In 2019, the park underwent restoration after suffering from the effects of the renovation and expansion of the Iloilo Freedom Grandstand in 1992, which led to the demolition of various structures within the park, including eateries and display booths.

== Gallery ==
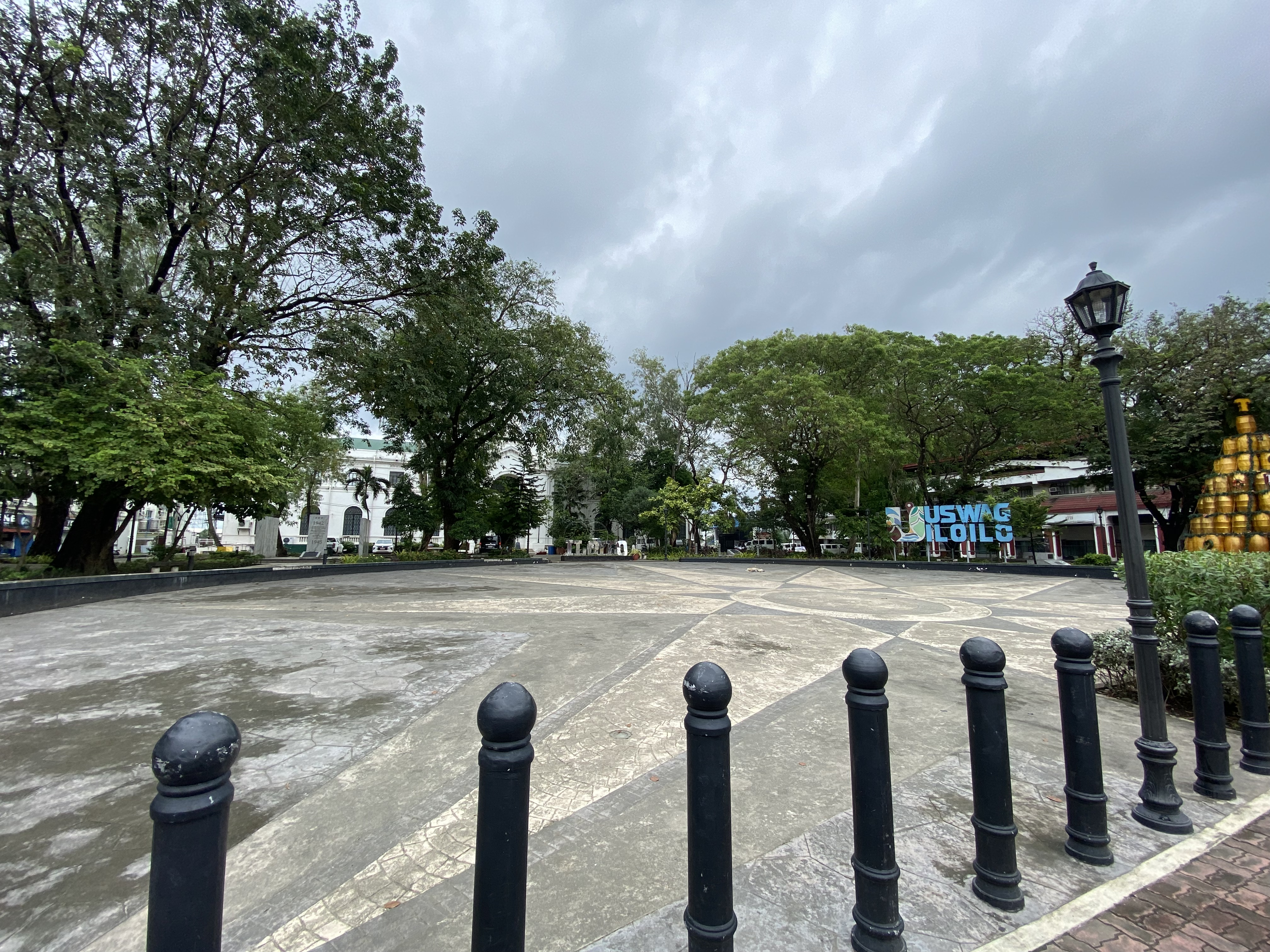
Tiles on the park displaying a sunburst pattern

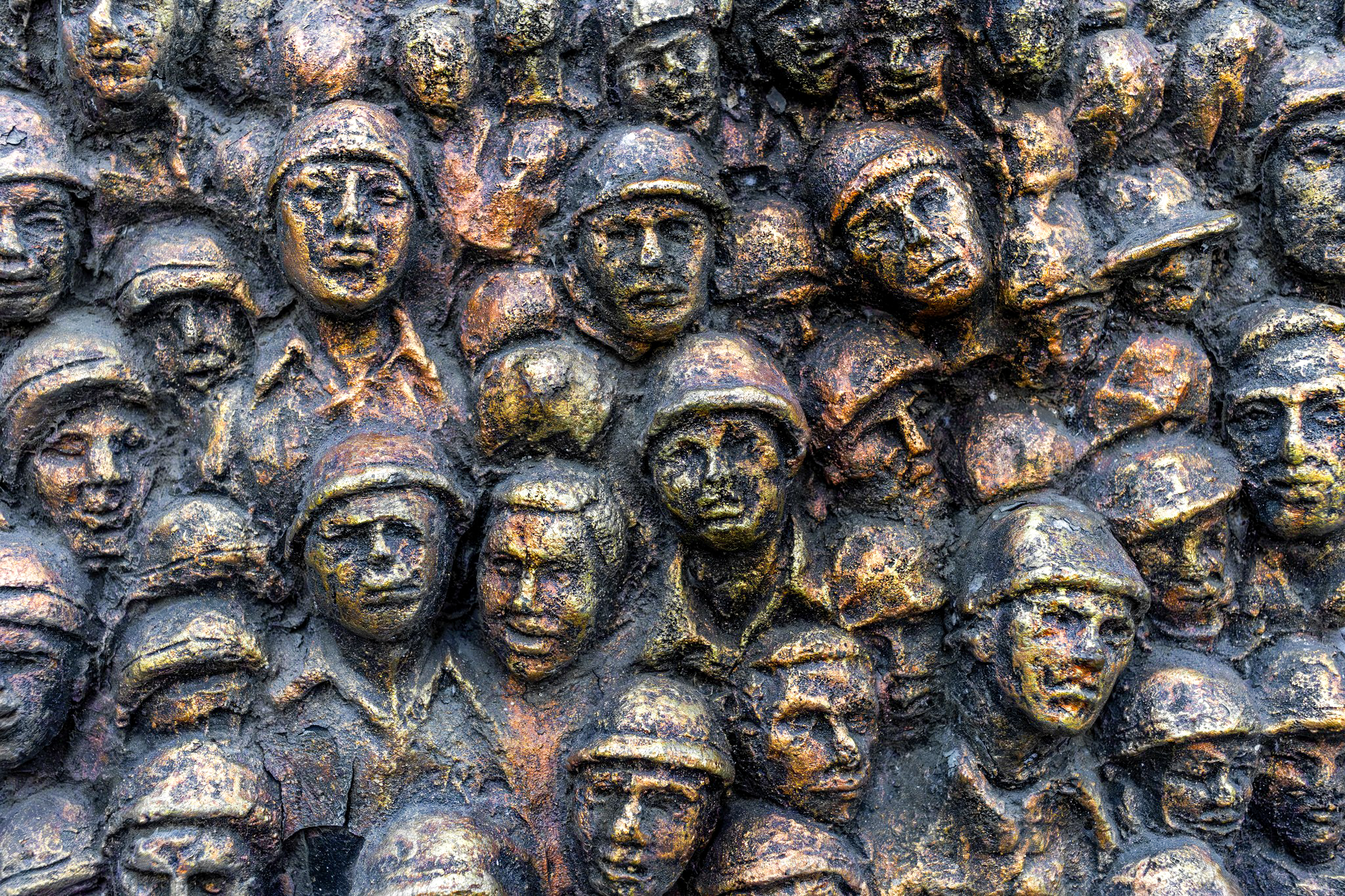
World War II Memorial Wall for Iloilo veterans

== See also ==
- Plaza Libertad
