= Nicholas Loney =

British businessman and vice-consul (1826–1869)

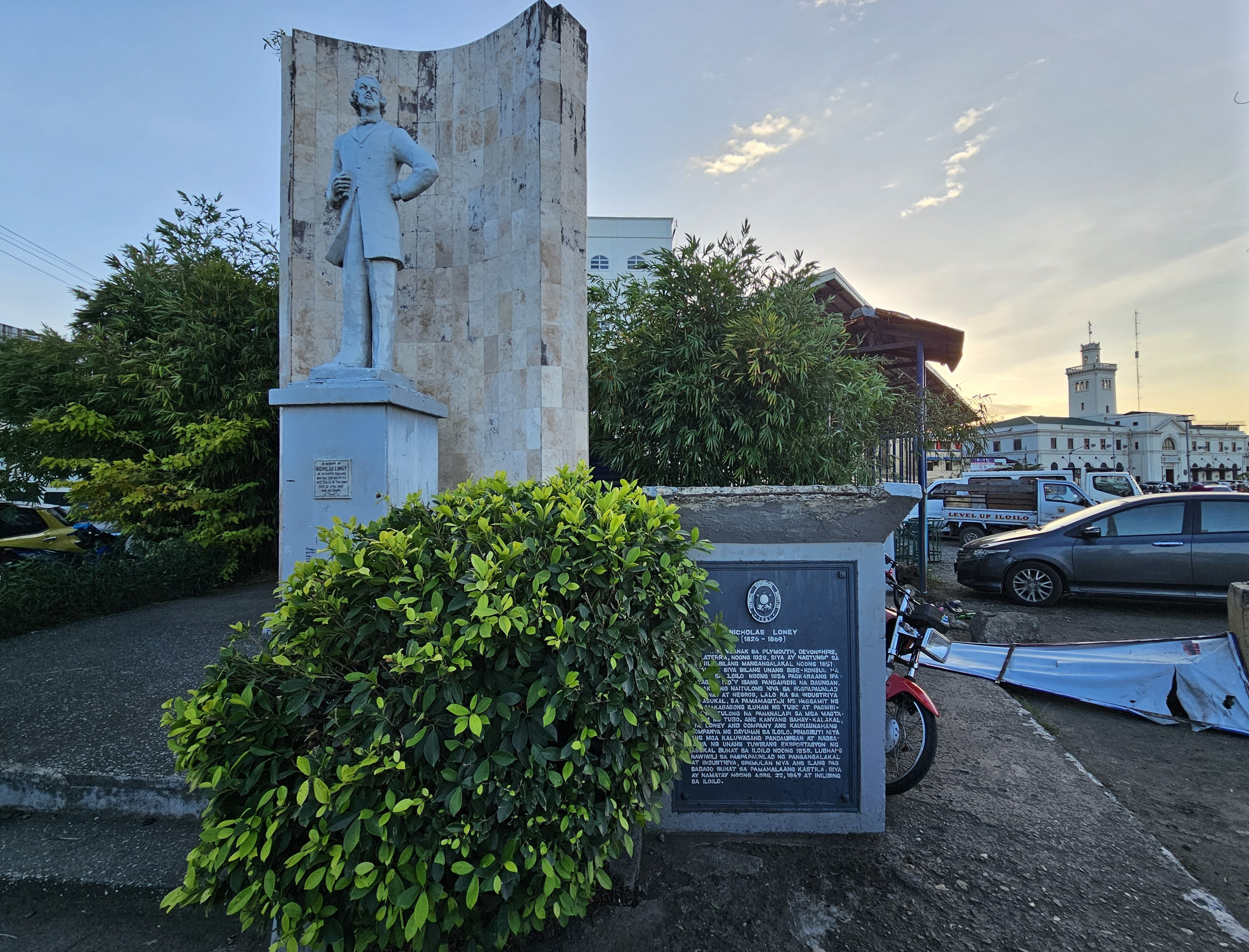
Statue of Nicholas Loney and historical marker by the National Historical Institute along Muelle Loney Street in Iloilo City

Nicholas Loney (1826, Plymouth, United Kingdom – April 23, 1869, Mount Kanlaon, Negros Island, Philippines) was an English businessman and the British Empire's vice-consul in the city of Iloílo.

== Early life ==
The younger son of Admiral Robert Loney, of the Royal Navy, and Ann Condy, Nicholas Loney left home at 16. He first went to Ibero-America where he traveled extensively and became fluent in Spanish. He then turned home to Plymouth, England but stayed only a short time before departing for Asia. He eventually ended up in Singapore where he worked for Ker & Co., a merchant house.

== Career ==
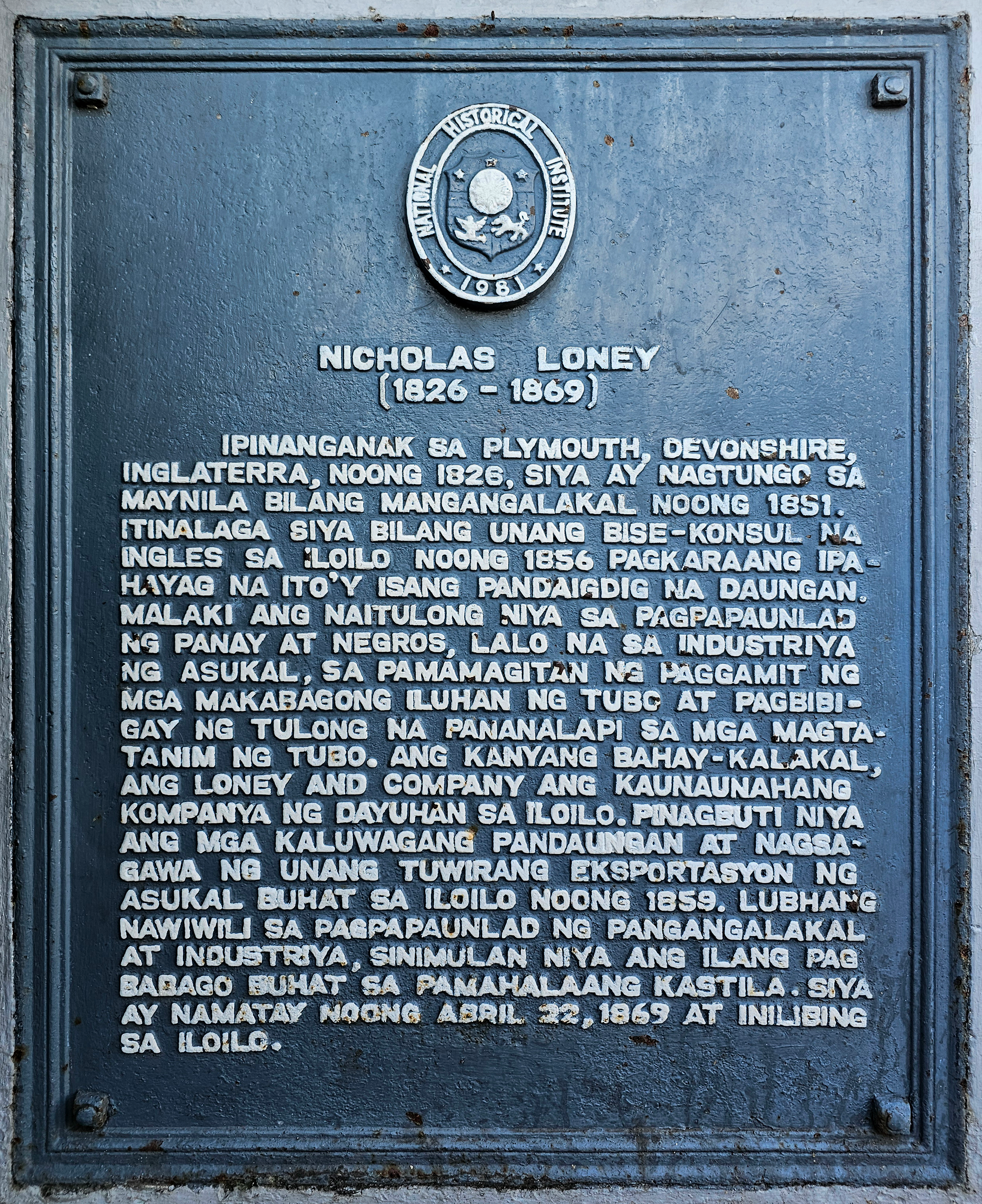
National Historical Institute marker installed in 1981 in Iloilo City

As the Philippines opened to international trade, Kerr & Co. sent him to Manila where he became a popular figure among the business community. When the city of Iloílo was opened to international trade in 1855, he was appointed as the first British Vice Consul in the city the following year on 11 July 1856.

In the Philippines, the hacienda system and lifestyles were influenced by the Spanish colonisation that occurred via Mexico for more than 300 years, but which only took off in the 1850s at Loney's behest. Loney's objective, according to Alfred W. McCoy, was the systematic deindustrialisation of Iloílo. This deindustrialisation was to be accomplished through shifting labour and capital from Iloílo's textile industry (Hiligaynon: habol Ilonggo), the origins of which predate the arrival of the Castilians, to sugar-production on the neighbouring island of Negros. The Port of Iloílo was also opened to the flood of cheaply priced British textiles. These changes had the double effect of strengthening England and Scotland's textile industries at the expense of Iloílo's and satisfying the growing European demand for sugar.

Sugar-production was increasing due to growing price of sugar in Manila and Loney profited from both haciendero and sacada alike by providing loans and purchasing modern machinery from Europe through his firm, Loney & Kerr Co., which helped increased the efficiency of sugar-production on Panay and Negros. He also encouraged improvements in raw-materials-export infrastructure at the Port of Iloílo, reclamation of the western bank of the Iloílo River and the construction of Progreso Street (present-day Isidro de la Rama Street) which became the location of numerous sugar warehouses, including his own.

== Death ==
He died on 23 April 1869 while exploring Mount Kanlaon on the island of Negros. He was buried by the seashore under some coconut trees in what is now Rizal Street in Iloilo City.

== Legacy ==
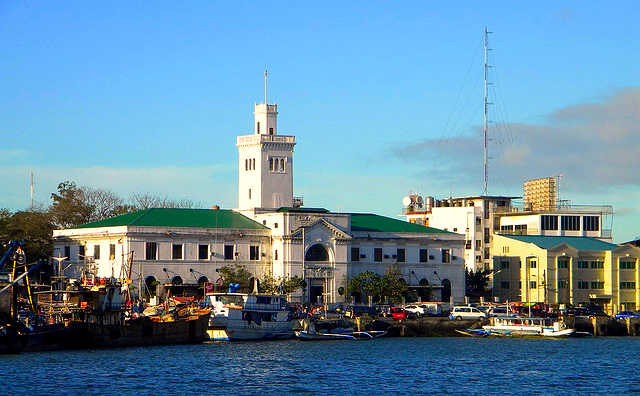
Iloilo Customs House along Muelle Loney with the Iloilo River in the foreground

In March 1904, the Municipal Council of Iloilo passed a resolution naming the quay along the Iloilo River, part of the Port of Iloilo, as Loney Waterfront (Spanish: Muelle Loney). In March 1981 a statue of Loney was unveiled at the end of the waterfront.

Loney had unwittingly planted the seeds of a longstanding social conflict on both Panay and Negros, the fruits of which taste ever bitter to this day. In the late 20th and early 21st centuries, attempts to abolish the hacienda system in the country through land-reform laws have not been successful. The expiration of the Laurel–Langley Agreement and the resultant collapse of the Negros sugar industry gave President Ferdinand Marcos Sr. the opening to strip the hacenderos of their self-appointed roles as kingmakers in national politics, though arguably such an opportunity had been squandered and any significant gains stillborn.
