= Calle Real, Iloilo =

Historic street in Iloilo City, Philippines

Calle Real
- J.M. Basa Street (official)
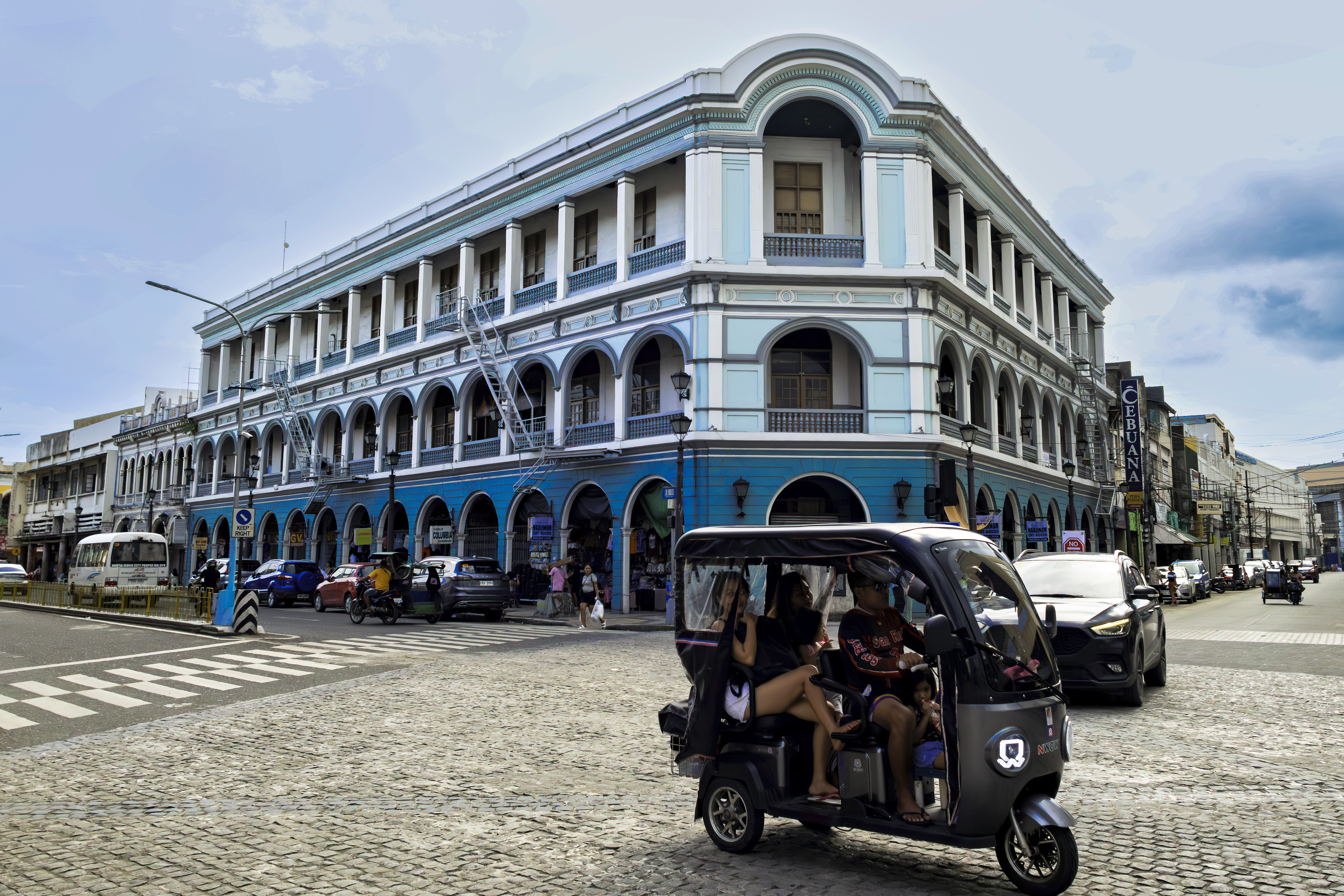
- Eusebio Villanueva Building on Aldeguer Street Junction
- Interactive map of Calle Real
- Former name: Calle Real
- Namesake: Jose Maria Basa (official name)
- Length: 0.75 km (0.47 mi); Based on Google Maps
- Location: Iloilo City, Philippines
- Coordinates: 10°41′37″N 122°34′17″E
- East end: General Hughes Street
- Major junctions: Ortiz Street; Mapa Street; Guanco Street; Aldeguer Street
- West end: Iznart Street

Construction
- Completion: 1800s (Spanish colonial period)

Other
- Status: Heritage zone (Declared by the NHCP in 2013; the district)

Calle Real (lit. 'Royal Street' in Spanish), officially named as J.M. Basa Street, is a historic street located in the old downtown district of Iloilo City Proper in Iloilo City, Philippines. It is home to several fine examples of luxury American-era neoclassical, beaux-arts, and art deco buildings. The street has been famous since the Spanish era and once served as the city's main shopping center for more than a century.

The street's heritage designation by the local government has been expanded into a zone known as the Calle Real Heritage Zone, which covers the long stretch of J.M. Basa and the streets and thoroughfares of Aldeguer, Mapa, Ortiz, Muelle Loney (Loney Wharf), Solis, Rizal, and Iznart (from Plazoleta Gay to Iloilo Central Market). The area is also commonly referred to as the old downtown of Iloilo.

J.M. Basa was named in honor of José María Basa, a Filipino businessman, propagandist, and close associate of José Rizal.

== History ==
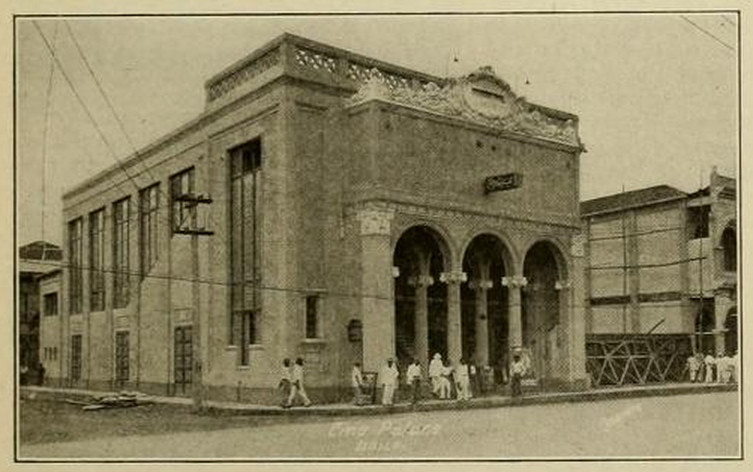
Regent Theatre, Calle Real, c. 1930

Even during the Spanish colonial era, Calle Real was the main street of commerce for Iloilo. José Rizal was even impressed by the city during his arrival.

During the early period of American occupation of the Philippines, Calle Real was known as a hub of high-end shopping outlets selling products from Europe.

The street was officially renamed in honor of Jose Maria Basa, a Filipino businessman-propagandist who was a compatriot of José Rizal. The street remained popularly known as Calle Real. The name would also be later used to refer to the central business district of Iloilo City.

The Art-Deco buildings and other structures along the street deteriorated but remained to be a shopping hub of the city. Calle Real as a district consisting of Aldeguer, Guanco and Iznart, J. M. Basa, and Mapa streets was declared an Iloilo City heritage zone by the virtue of Ordinance No. 00-054, also known as the Local Cultural Heritage Conservation Ordinance which established the Iloilo City Cultural Heritage Conservation Council (ICCHCC).

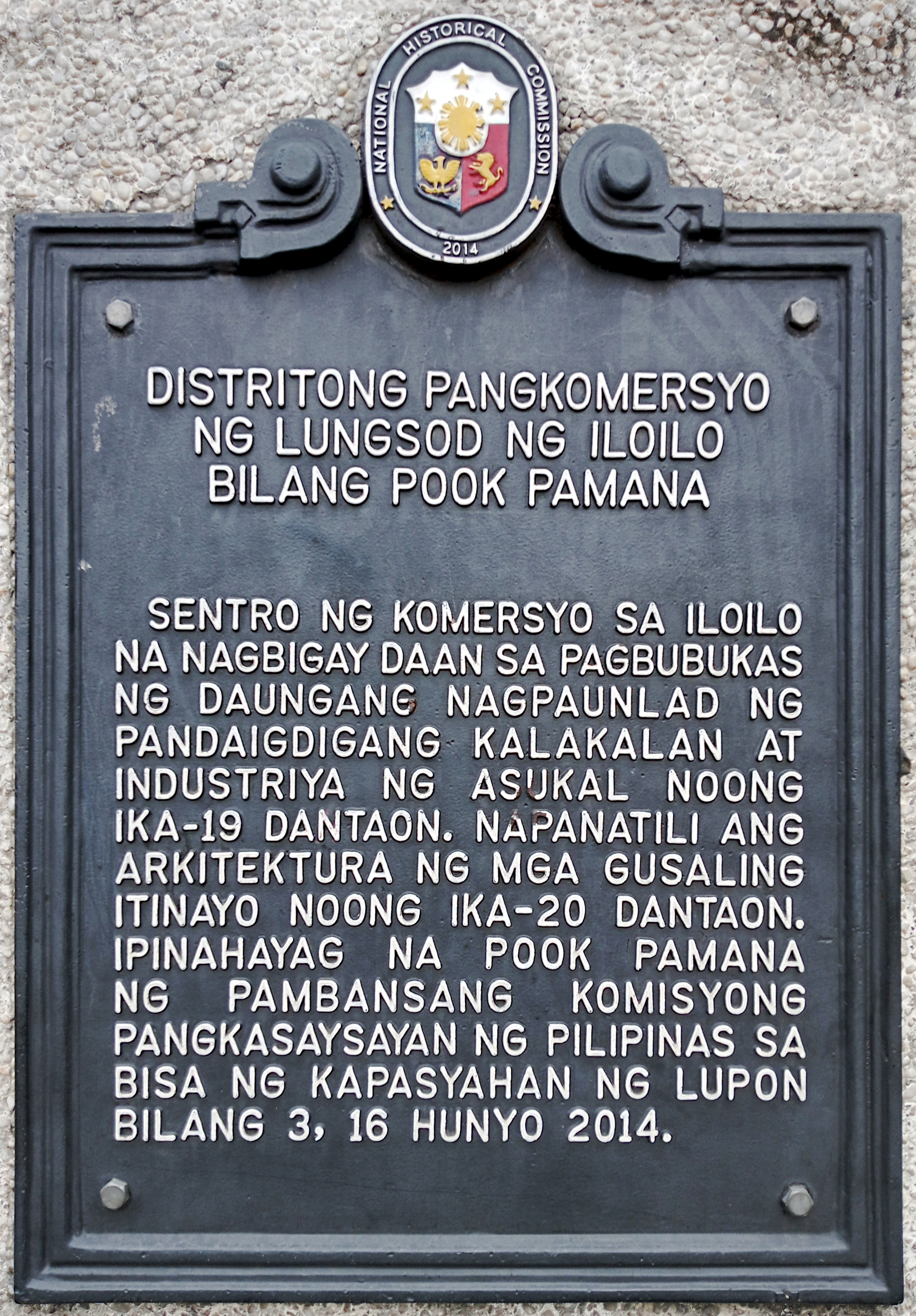
Calle Real historical marker

The National Historical Commission of the Philippines declared Calle Real as a district and a heritage zone on August 8, 2014, with the unveiling of a historical marker outside the Villanueva Building. Its current restoration has been a public-private partnership between the government and the Iloilo Cultural Heritage Foundation, Inc. (ICHFI).

With the recent gradual shift of business activity to other parts of the city, particularly in the district of Mandurriao, efforts have been made to revitalize and repurpose Calle Real. These initiatives include the pedestrianization of Calle Real, the underground installation of utility wires, and the removal of obstructive advertisements. Regarding pedestrianization, experiments have been conducted, such as closing the street on Sundays, but permanent pedestrianization remains a contested issue. Cultural performances are also staged to promote Ilonggo heritage and attract both domestic and foreign tourists. The pedestrianization experiment ended on March 9, 2014, though the Philippine Chamber of Commerce in Iloilo expressed a desire to make it permanent, citing the potential to encourage walking and to take pride in the newly rehabilitated heritage buildings along the street.

In 2023, the underground cabling in the downtown area, including Calle Real, began. It was financed by MORE Power, the city’s sole power distributor. The underground cabling covers the entire length of Calle Real from the Plazoleta Gay to Plaza Libertad. The removal of tangled overhead wires and cables would make way for the historic buildings along the street to be more visible and aesthetically pleasing. By January 2025, the removal of overhead wires and cables on the entire stretch of the street was completed.

== Notable architectural structures ==
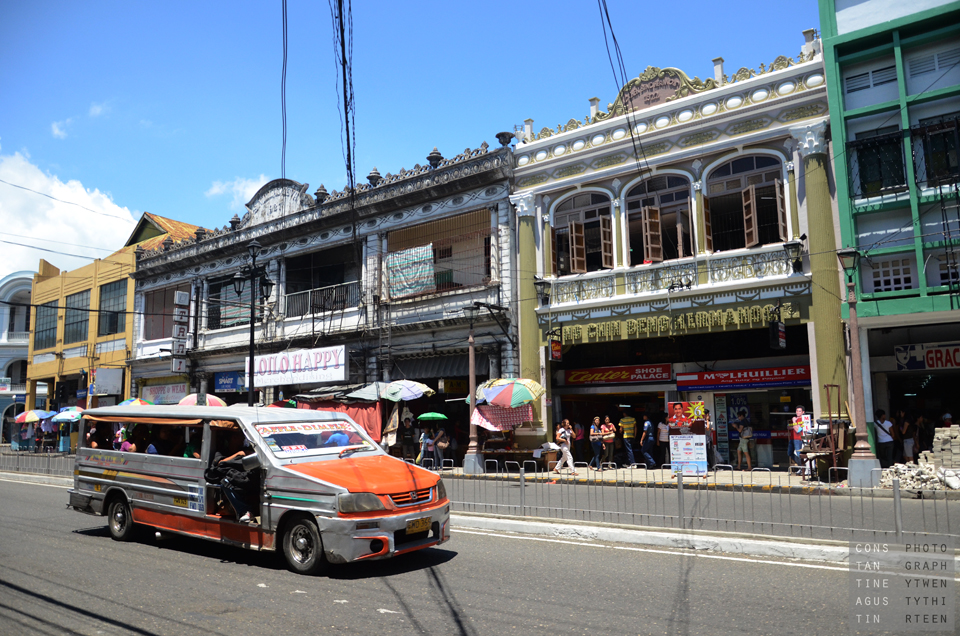
Jeepney traversing Calle Real

Calle Real is noted for its historic buildings and structures, many of which were built between the late 19th century and the early 20th century.

- Eusebio Villanueva Building (Edificio de Villanueva) – Formerly known as the Washington International Hotel, this building dates back to 1927. It hosted American, British, and Spanish patrons as well as Chinese bankers and merchants. It fell into disuse and deteriorated but was restored in 2012.
- Javellana Building (Edificio de Javellana) – Built in 1922, this neo-Renaissance architectural building now houses a tenant for Sarabia Optical.
- Celso Ledesma Building (Edificio de Celso Ledesma) – Constructed in 1923, this commercial building now houses several well-known local stores.
- Regent Theater (Teatro de Regente) – Built in 1928, it housed one of the first movie theatres in the country to operate for a long time, Cine Palace. Though its interior was renovated in the early 1980s or late 1970s, it retained its façade in the Neo-Classical style.
- Cine Eagle (Cine Aguila) – Constructed in 1927, it became one of the largest and most modern theaters in the country at the time.
- Lux Theater (Teatro de Luz) – Another theater, opened on May 7, 1922, by Don Julio Q. Javellana and William Henry Horstmann.
- Iloilo Customs House (Aduana de Iloilo) – located on the Sunburst Park. It is the largest customs house outside Manila and one of only three heritage customs houses in the country, alongside those in Manila and Cebu.
- Elizalde Building (Edificio de Elizalde y Compañia)– This bahay na bato--styled edifice now houses the Museum of Philippine Economic History, the first museum dedicated to economic history in the Philippines.
- Hoskyn's Department Store – It is the first department store in the Philippines, established in 1877.
- Iloilo Masonic Temple – Facing Plaza Libertad, was completed in 1928. It serves as the headquarters of Iloilo-Acacia Lodge No. 11, which was chartered on February 13, 1917. During World War II, it was used as the headquarters of the Japanese Imperial Army. It was declared a National Historical Landmark on February 9, 2018.
- Plaza Libertad – Formerly known as Plaza Alfonso XII during the Spanish colonial era, it is historic plaza where the flag of the first Philippine Republic was raised after Spain surrendered Iloilo. This marked Iloilo in history as the last capital of the Spanish Empire in Asia and the Pacific.

== Gallery ==
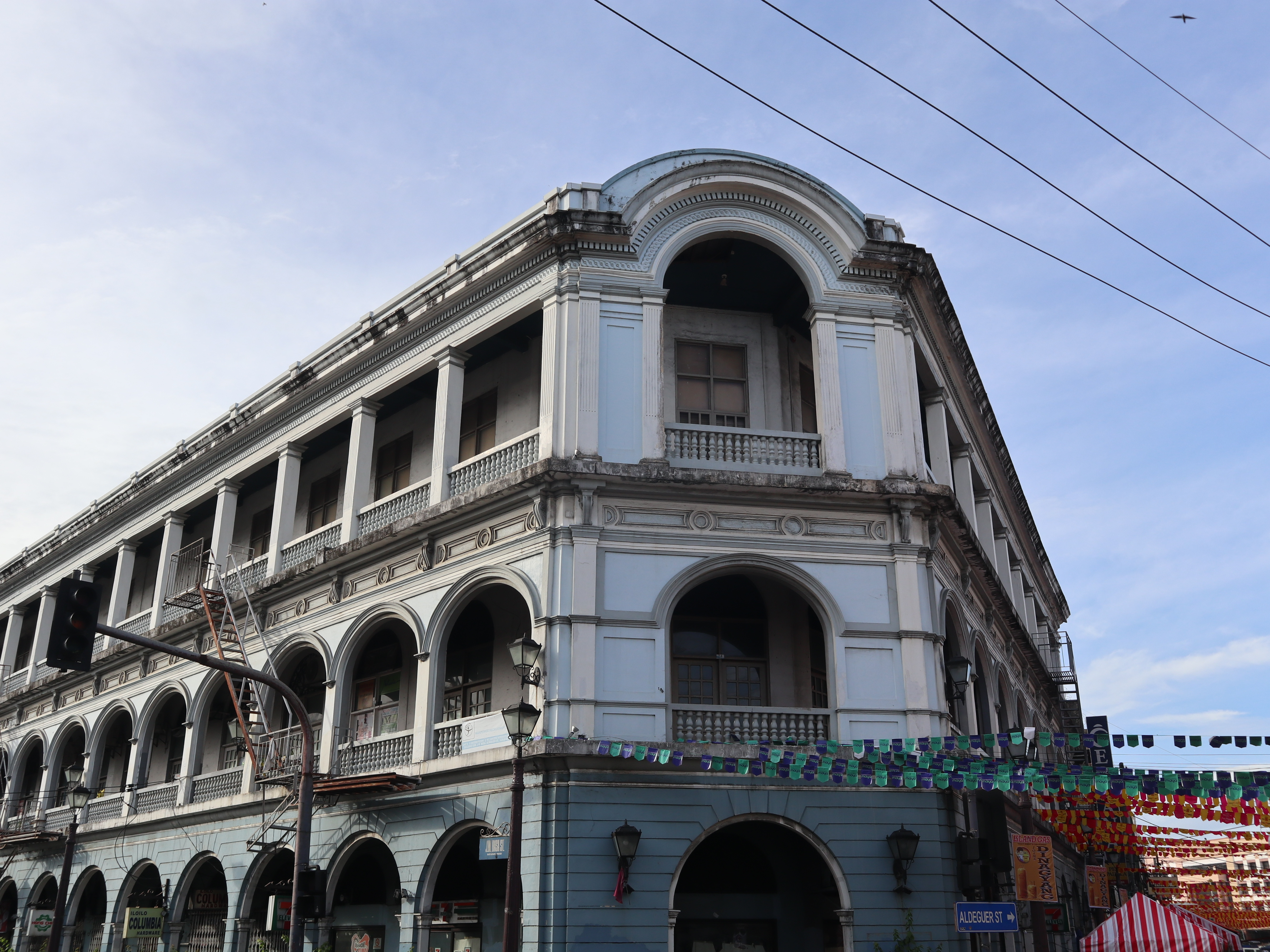
Eusebio Villanueva Building façade

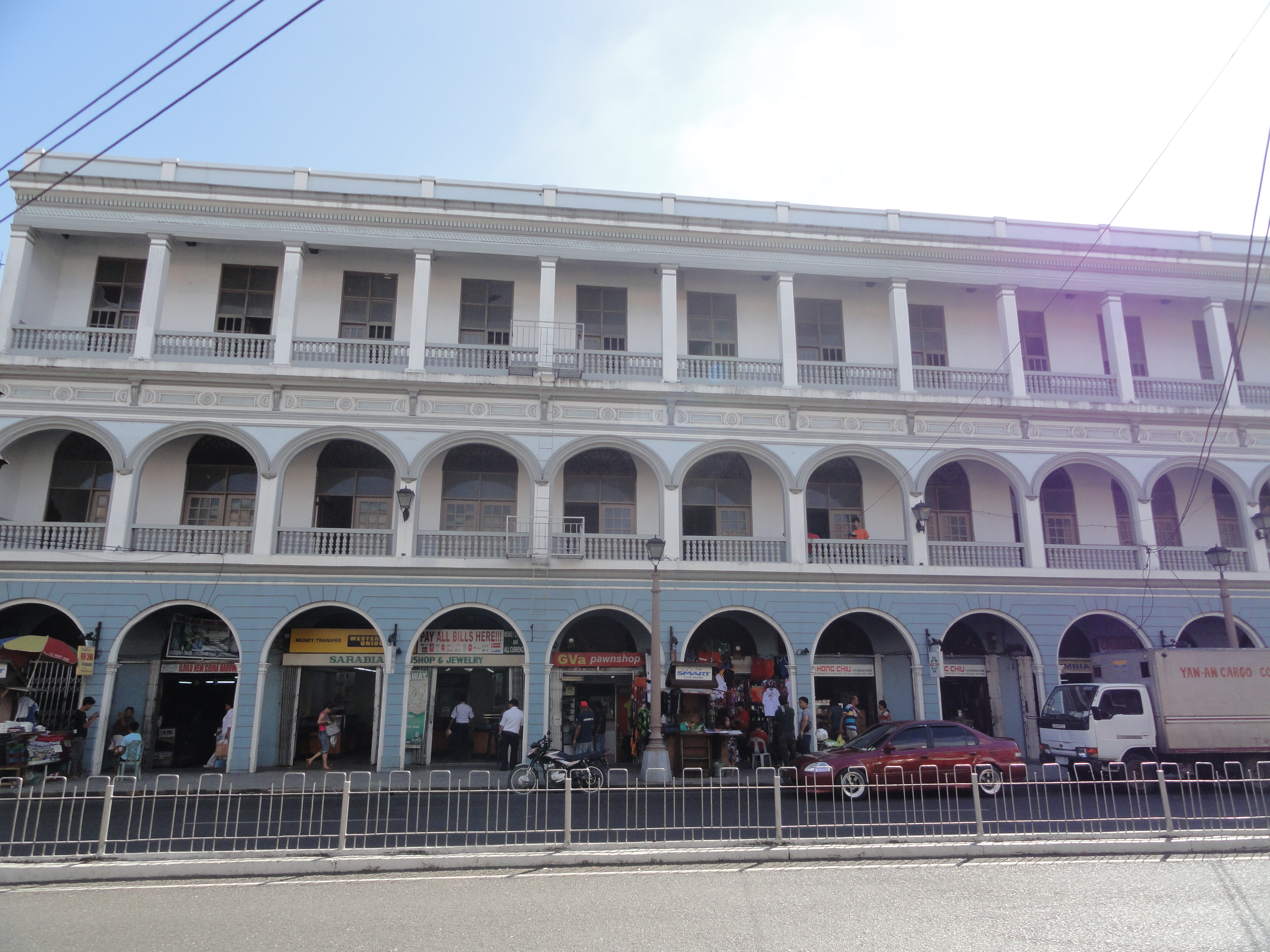
Eusebio Villanueva Building left side view

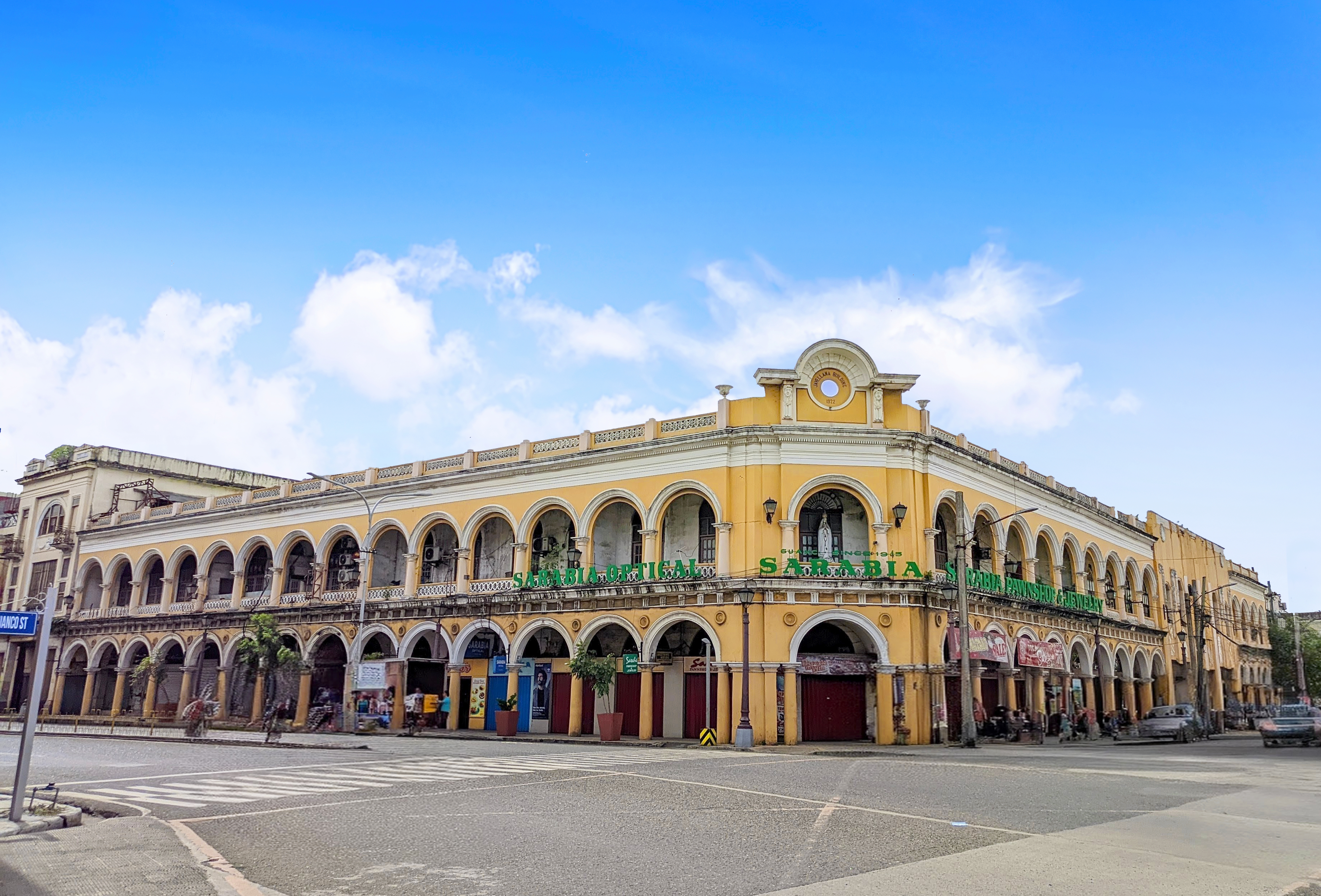
Javellana Building

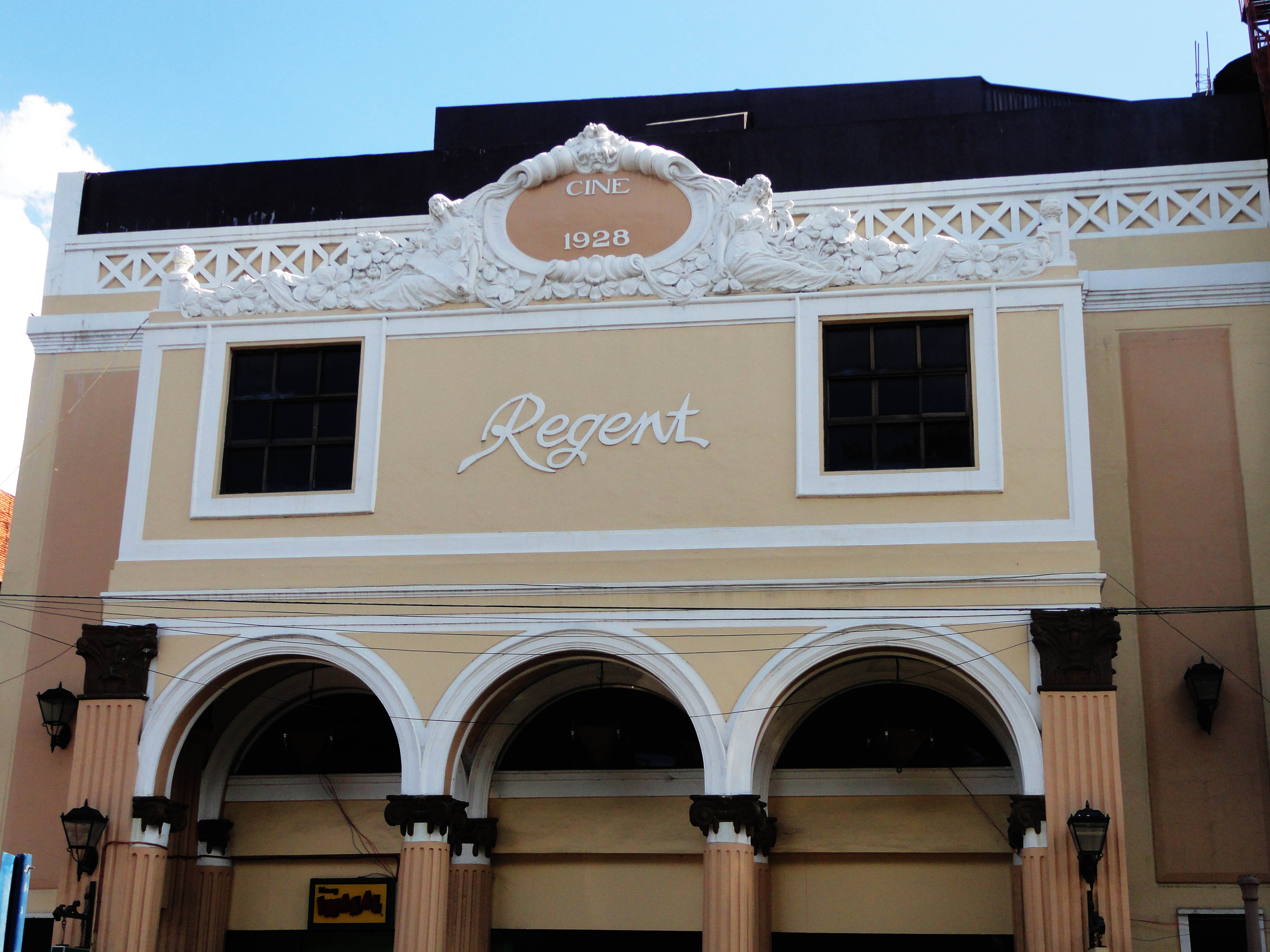
Regent Theater Building

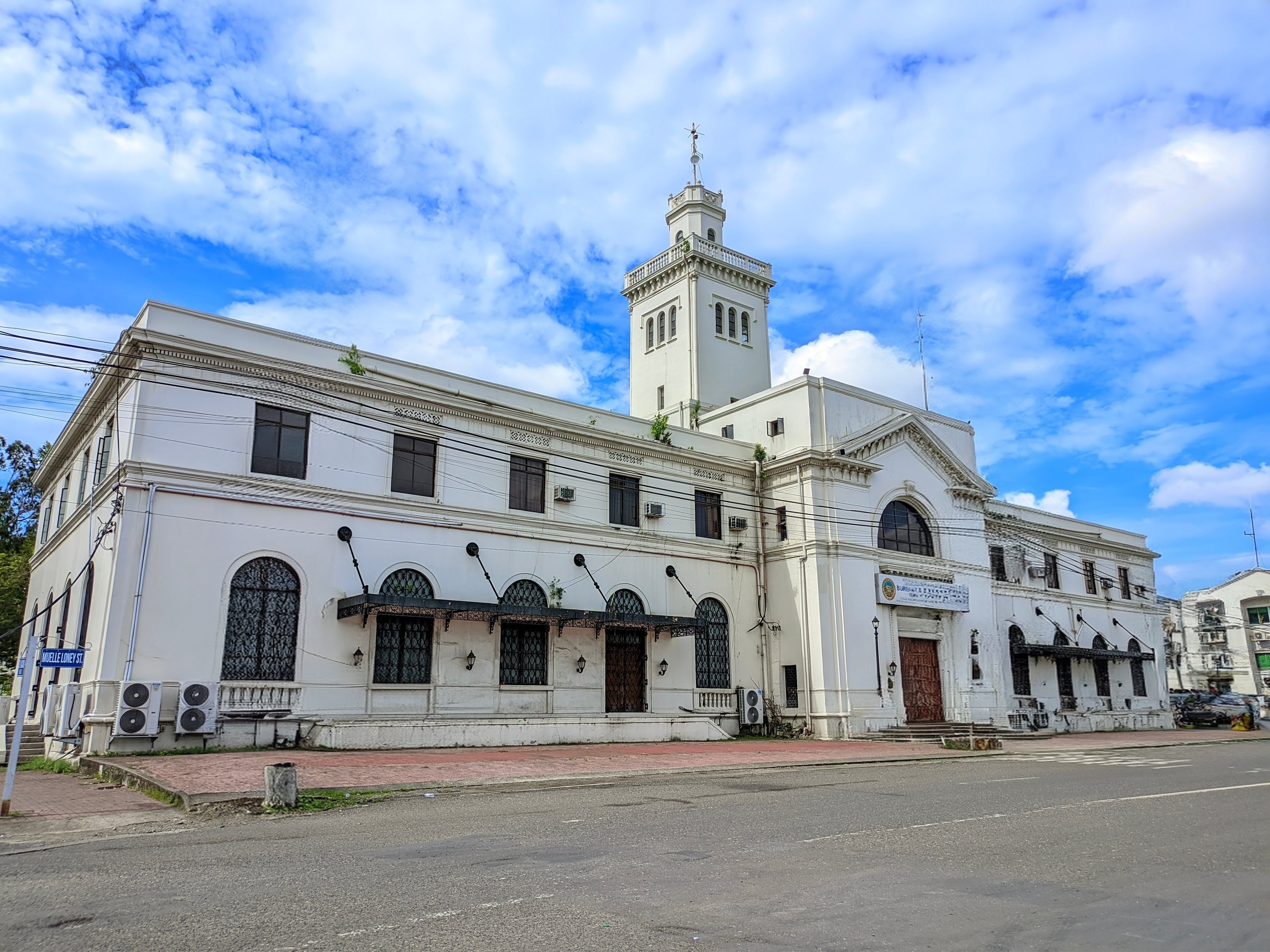
Iloilo Customs House, also known as Aduana de Iloilo

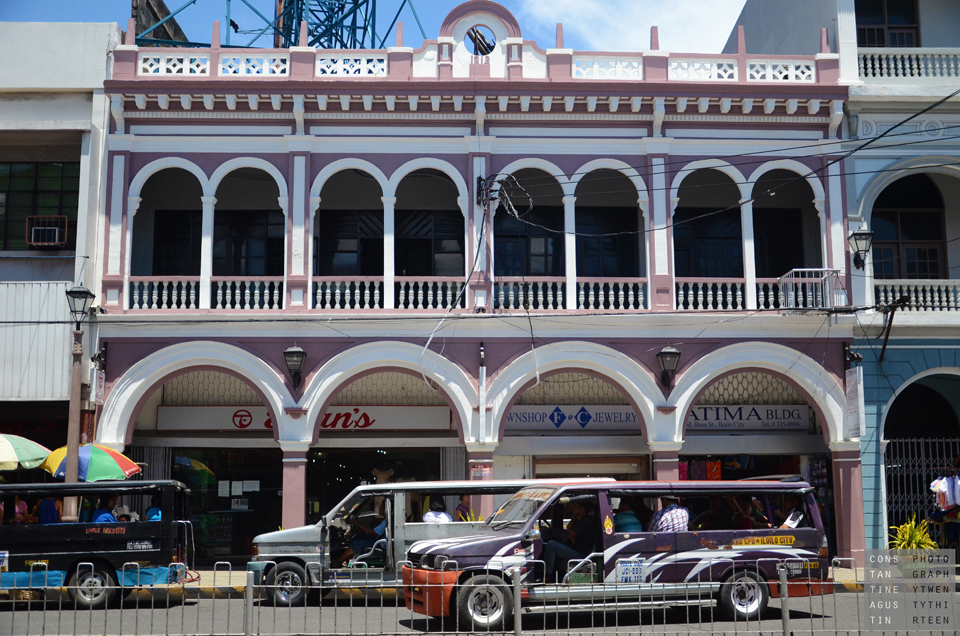
Divinagracia-Alba Building

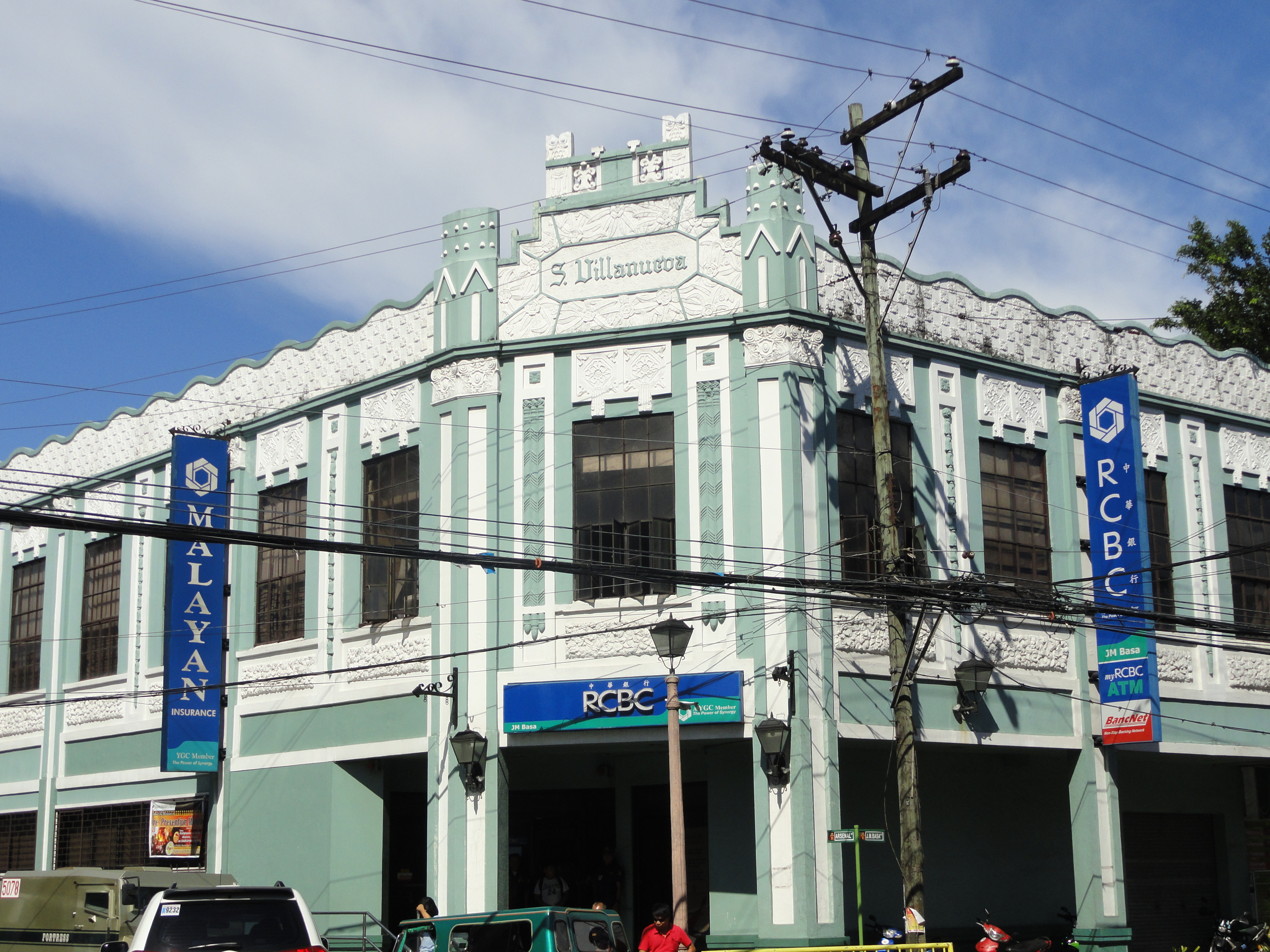
Serafin Villanueva Building

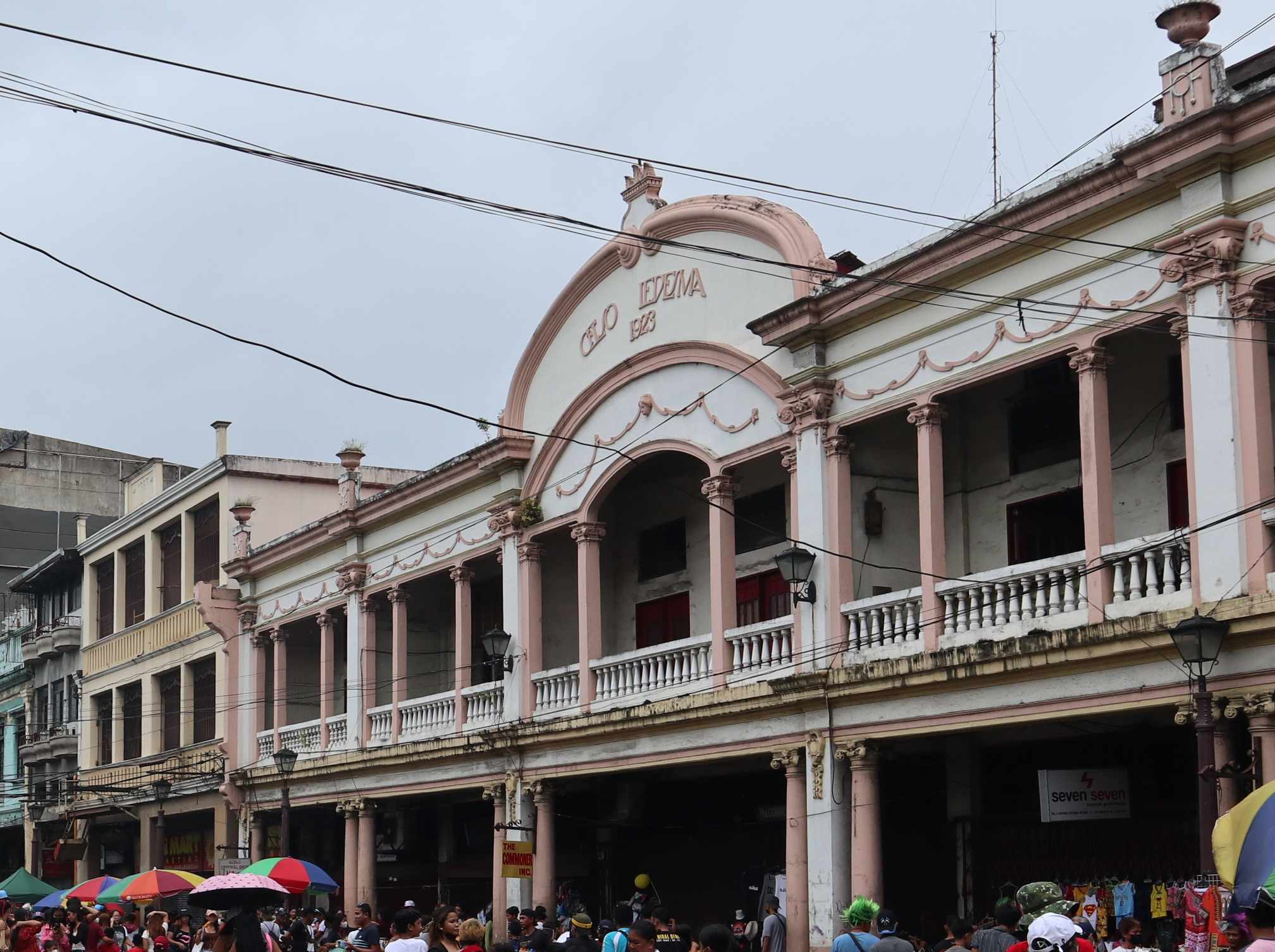
Celso Ledesma Building

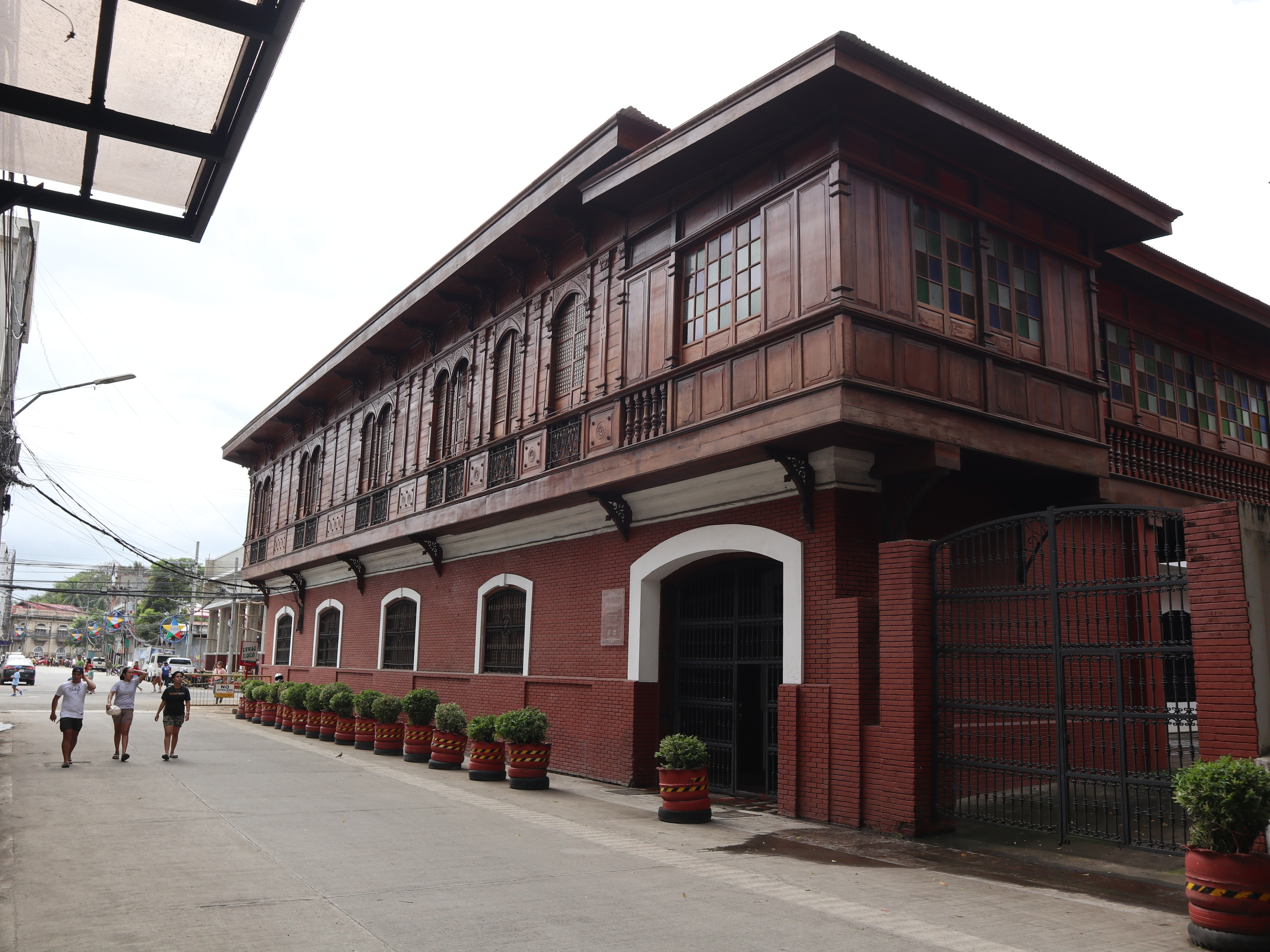
Elizalde Building, houses the Museum of Philippine Economic History

== See also ==
- Escolta Street
- Colon Street
- Iloilo Central Business District
