= Eusebio Villanueva Building =

Commercial building in Iloilo City, Philippines

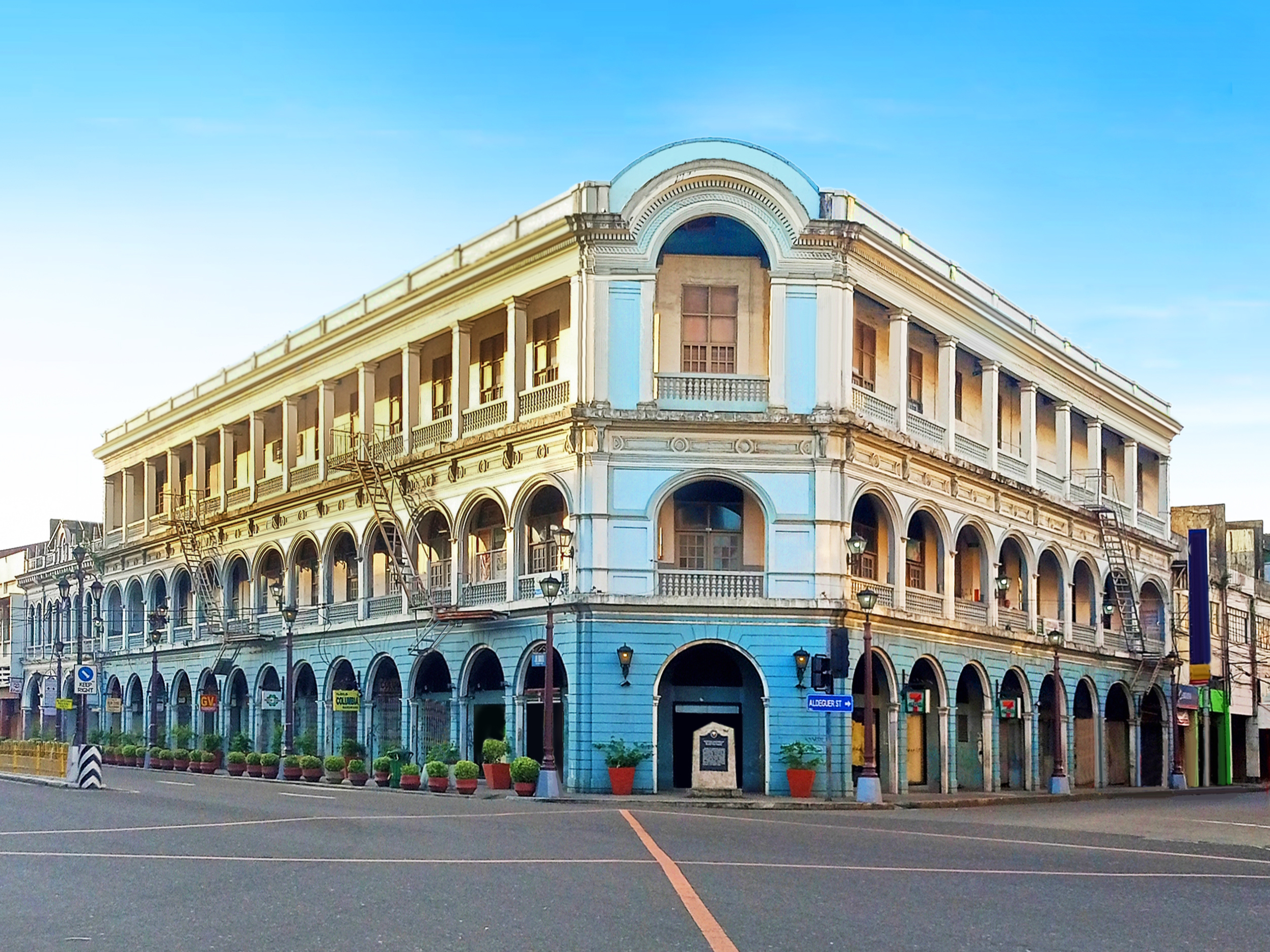
- The facade of the Eusebio Villanueva Building at the junction of Calle Real and Aldeguer Street
- Interactive map of the Eusebio Villanueva Building area
- Former names: Washington International Hotel
- Alternative names: E. Villanueva Building; Villanueva Building

General information
- Status: Completed
- Architectural style: Neoclassical architecture
- Location: Calle Real, Iloilo City, Philippines
- Coordinates: 10.694530°N 122.570459°E
- Completed: 1927
- Renovated: 2012

The Eusebio Villanueva Building, also known as E. Villanueva Building or simply Villanueva Building, is a neoclassical building located along the historic Calle Real in Iloilo City Proper, Iloilo City, Philippines. Built in 1927, it was originally known as the Washington International Hotel. The hotel catered to American, British, and Spanish patrons, as well as Chinese bankers and merchants.

The building was restored in 2012, which now appears to be the centerpiece of the historic street. On August 8, 2014, the National Historical Commission of the Philippines installed a historical marker in front of the building, declaring Calle Real a heritage zone.

== Details ==
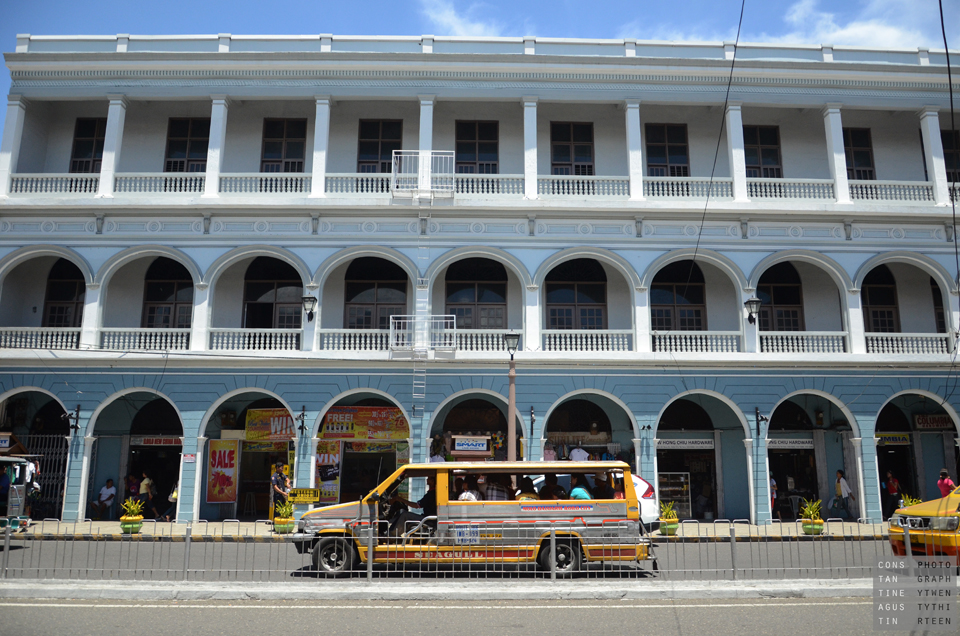
Side view

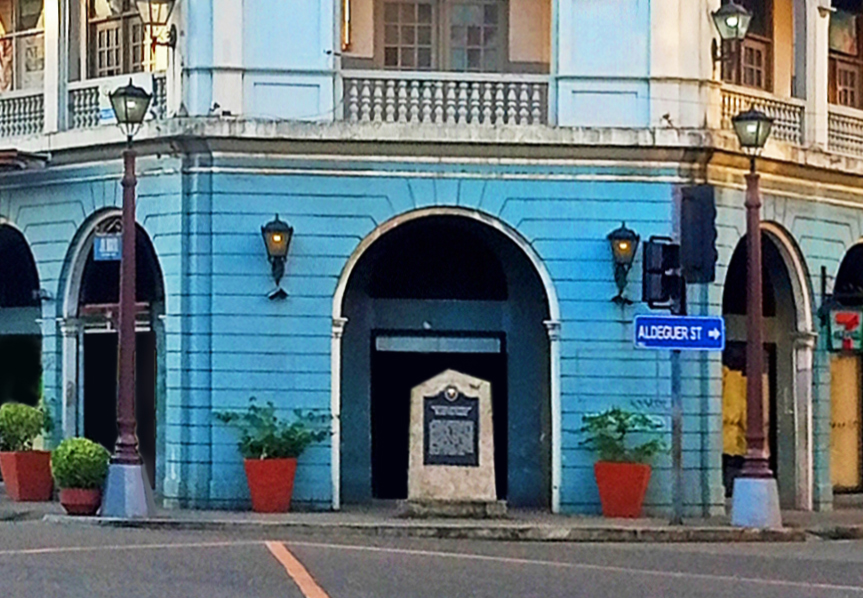
Historical marker

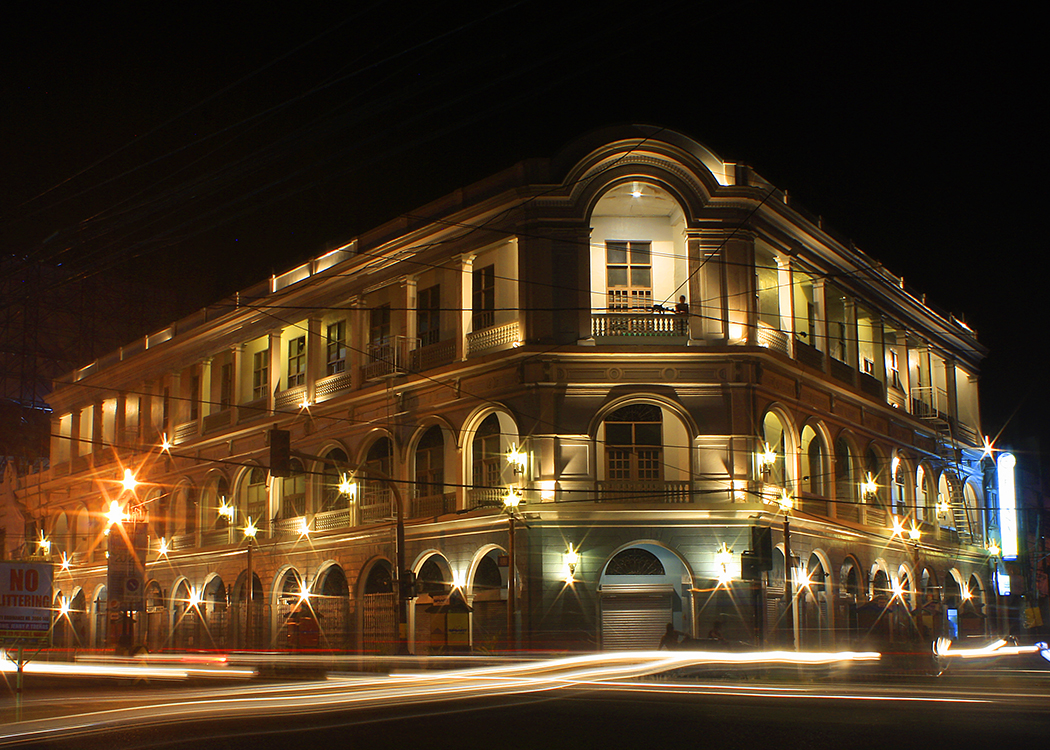
Night view
