= Museum of Philippine Political History =

Museum in Bulacan, Philippines

- Museo ng Kasaysayang Pampulitika ng Pilipinas (Filipino)
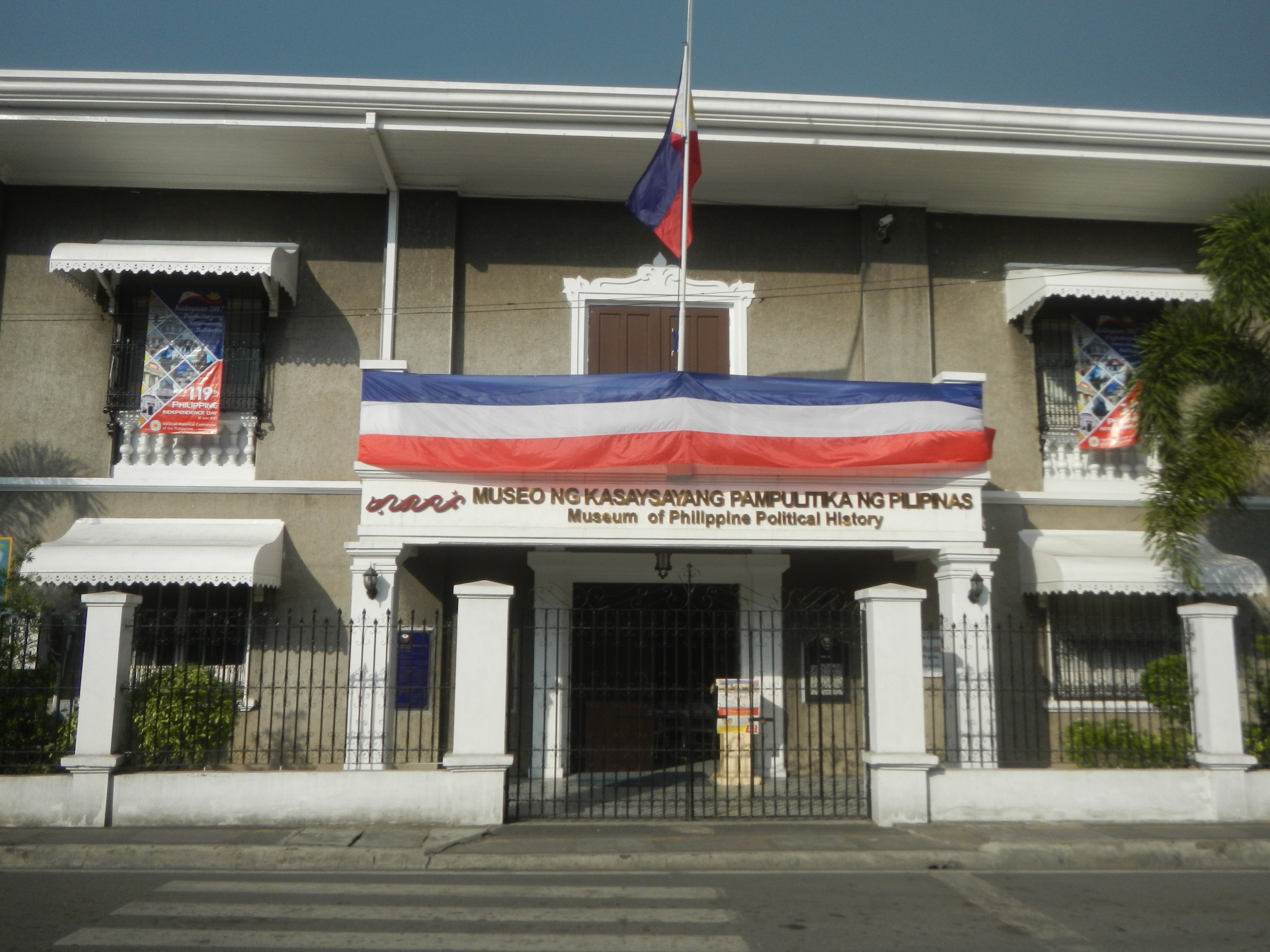
- Coordinates: 14°50′39″N 120°48′42″E
- Type: Museum
- Building details

General information
- Status: Completed
- Architectural style: Colonial
- Location: Malolos, Philippines
- Completed: 1580
- Renovated: 1852

The Museum of Philippine Political History (Filipino: Museo ng Kasaysayang Pampulitika ng Pilipinas) is a museum in Malolos, Philippines. It is located on Paseo del Congreso, Plaza Rizal, Malolos, Bulacan. The museum, owned and operated by the National Historical Commission of the Philippines (NHCP), opened to the public in 2001 to foster awareness for the country's different government systems which defined its political history, enabling an understanding of current political developments and encouraging action to safeguard republican values. The building was initially built on 1580. It was restored in 1852 and was converted into a municipal library. After the Philippine–American War, the building served as the provincial capitol Bulacan until 1930.

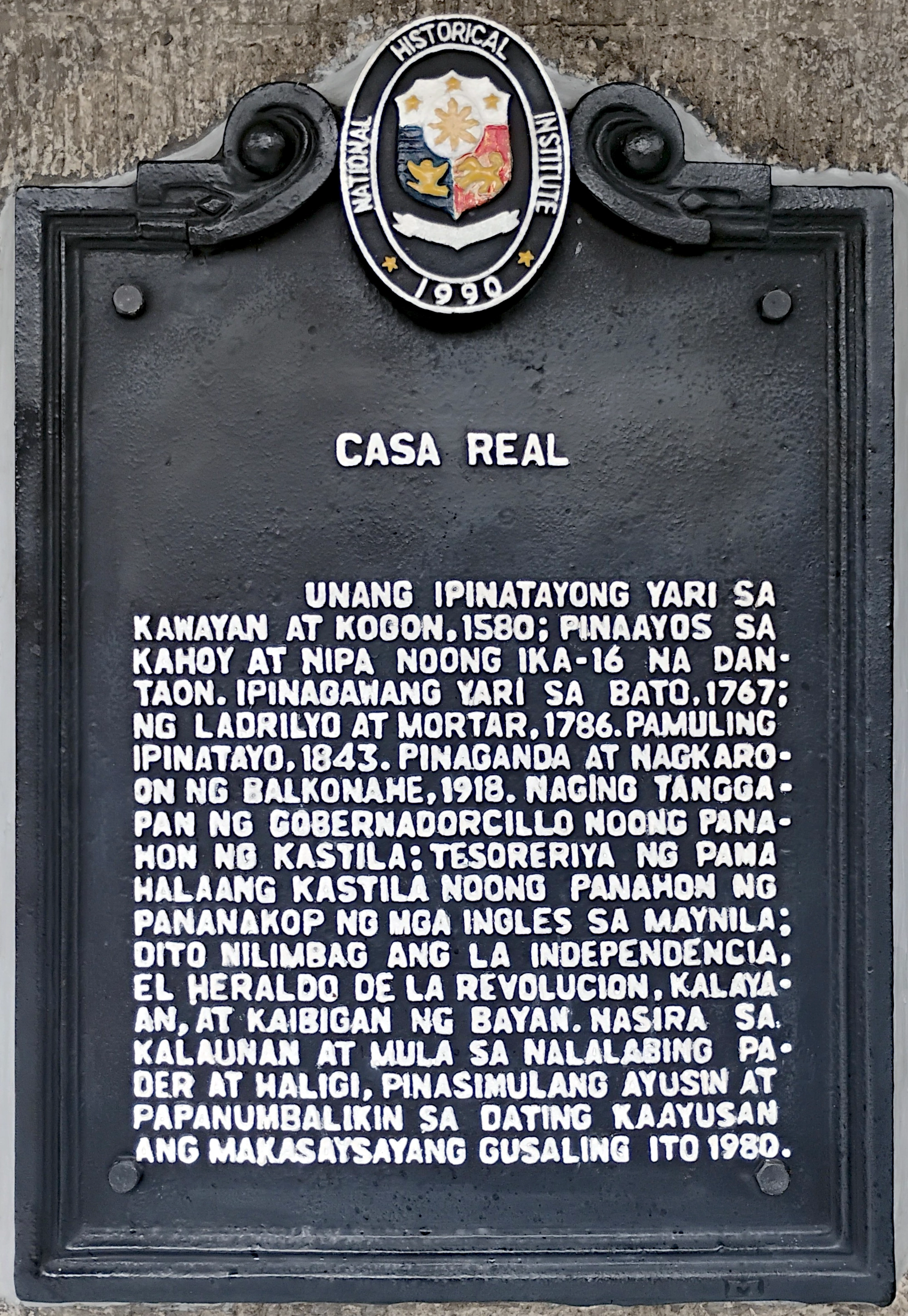
Historical marker for the building installed in 1990

The museum was then located at the grounds of the NHCP building on Kalaw Avenue in Rizal Park, Ermita, Manila. On October 12, 2016, the museum was relocated to the Casa Real Shrine, Malolos.

The museum contains relics from the First Philippine Republic, memorabilia of General Emilio Aguinaldo, relics from the wealthy families of Malolos, exhibits, a printing press of the Malolos Republic, and a display of the 21 Women of Malolos memorabilia.

== See also ==
- Museum of Philippine Economic History
- Museum of Philippine Maritime History
