= Museum of Philippine Economic History =

Museum in Iloilo City, Philippines

- Museo sang Kasaysayan sang Ekonomiya sang Pilipinas (Hiligaynon); Museo ng Kasaysayang Pang-ekonomiya ng Pilipinas (Filipino)
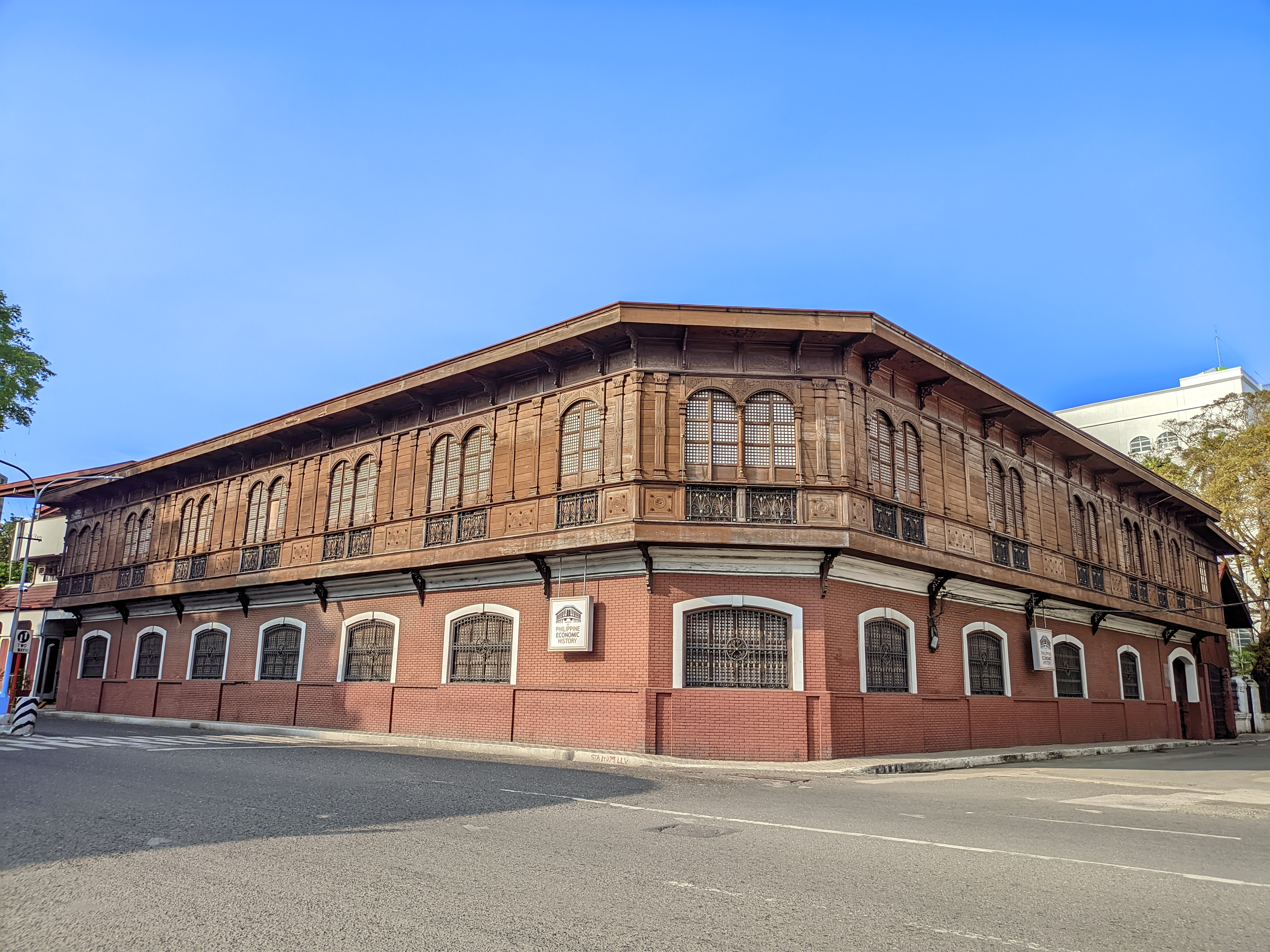
- The Elizalde Building as a museum in 2025
- Established: 2019
- Location: Elizalde Building, Calle Real, Iloilo City, Philippines
- Coordinates: 10°41′36″N 122°34′21″E
- Type: Museum
- Owner: National Historical Commission of the Philippines

Elizalde Building
- Edificio de Elizalde y Compañia (Spanish)
- Former names: Edificio de Ynchausti y Cia (Compañia); Commission on Audit Building

General information
- Current tenants: Museum of Philippine Economic History
- Inaugurated: 1905
- Renovated: 2018
- Owner: National Historical Commission of the Philippines

Museum of Philippine Economic History (Hiligaynon: Museo sang Kasaysayan sang Ekonomiya sang Pilipinas; Filipino: Museo ng Kasaysayang Pang-ekonomiya ng Pilipinas) is a museum in Iloilo City, Philippines. It is located on the historic street of Calle Real in Iloilo City Proper.

It hosted at the Elizalde Building (Spanish: Edificio de Elizalde y Compañia), which used to be the office of the Commission on Audit (COA) before it was donated to the National Historical Commission of the Philippines (NHCP) in 2015.

== Building history ==
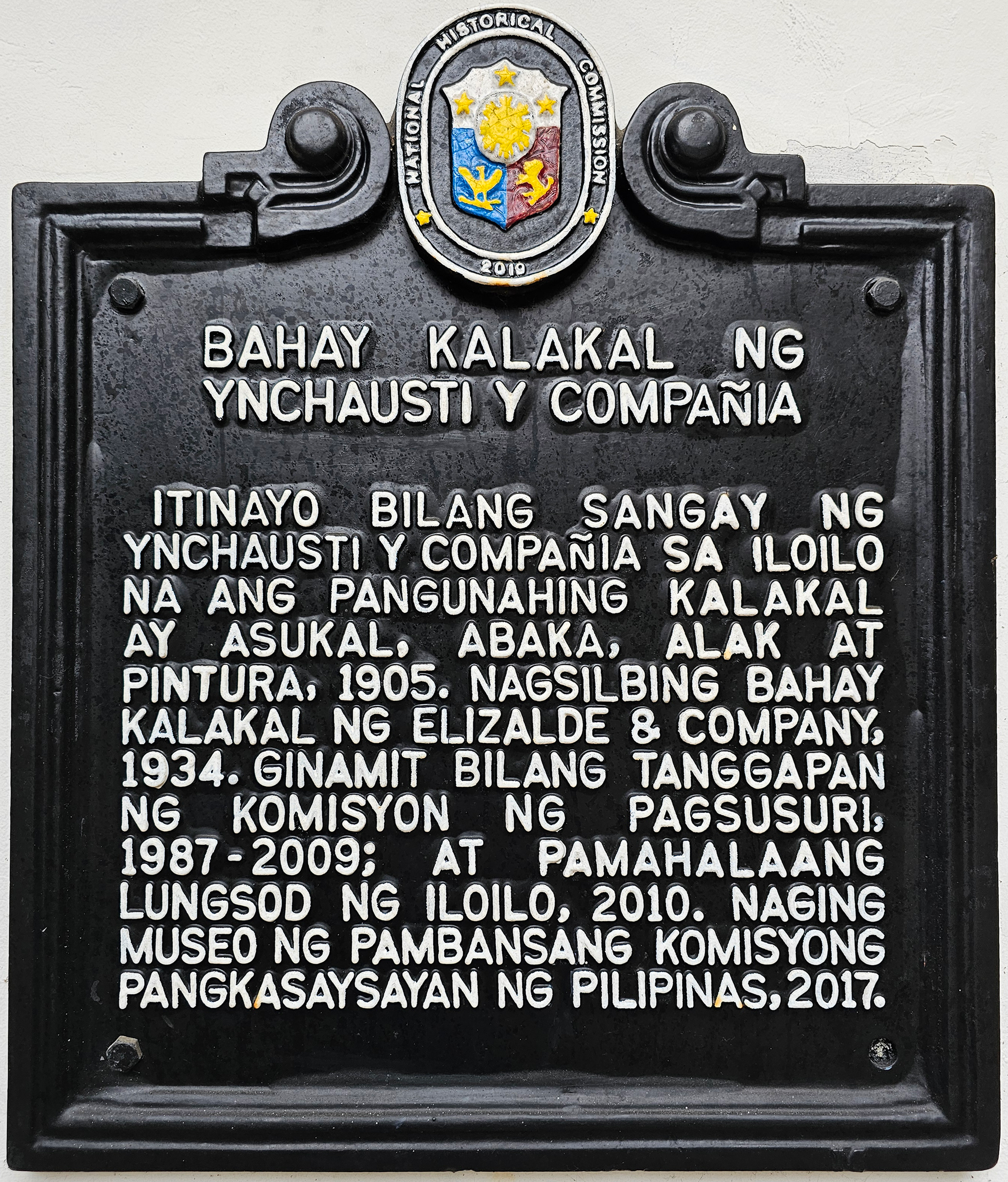
Historical marker for the building that was unveiled by the National Historical Commission of the Philippines in 2019

Constructed in 1905, the building that now houses the museum was originally known as the Edificio de Ynchausti y Cia (Compañia). This structure served as a branch of the Ynchausti y Compañia in Iloilo, a significant trading company founded in 1816 by Basque entrepreneurs Jose Joaquin de Ynchausti Y Gurchategui and Joaquin Elizalde. The company was involved in various industries, including abaca, tobacco, sugar, shipping, banking, and hemp.

In 1934, the building was renamed the Elizalde y Compañia Building after the Elizalde family acquired the Ynchaustis' shares. The building was used as the family's residence, with the ground floor hosting the city's first comprehensive grocery store. The Commission on Audit (COA) later purchased the building and used it as its regional office until the agency relocated to Pavia, Iloilo. During COA's tenure, the building was also commonly referred to as the Elizalde Building and also hosted various offices of the Iloilo City Government, including the city health department, local civil registrar, city planning, city budget, and city tourism, among others, were located in the building.

In 2016, the COA donated the building to the National Historical Commission of the Philippines. The building underwent restoration starting in 2018 and was subsequently opened to the public as the Museum of Philippine Economic History on February 11, 2019.

== Galleries and collections ==
The Museum of Philippine Economic History consists of 13 galleries spread across two floors. These galleries collectively narrate the evolution of the Philippine economy, highlighting significant industries and historical developments.

The ground level features exhibits on the history of the building itself, Iloilo's role as an economic center, and an overview of the country's economic history. It also displays antiques, including century-old paper bills from the Japanese and American eras, encased in glass.

On the second level, the galleries explore ten major industries that have shaped the Philippine economy, such as rice production, boat making, pottery, body ornaments, textiles, blacksmithing, tobacco, sugar, abaca, and coconut. The exhibits also depict the diverse livelihoods of Filipinos across Luzon, Visayas, and Mindanao, and showcase collections related to the history of trade and commerce in the Philippines. The galleries are carefully curated to provide a comprehensive understanding of these industries and their impact on the nation's economic development.

== See also ==
- Museum of Philippine Maritime History
- Museum of Philippine Political History
