= Muelle Loney Street =

Street in Iloilo City, Philippines

- Muelle Loney Marginal Wharf Road; Iloilo River Wharf
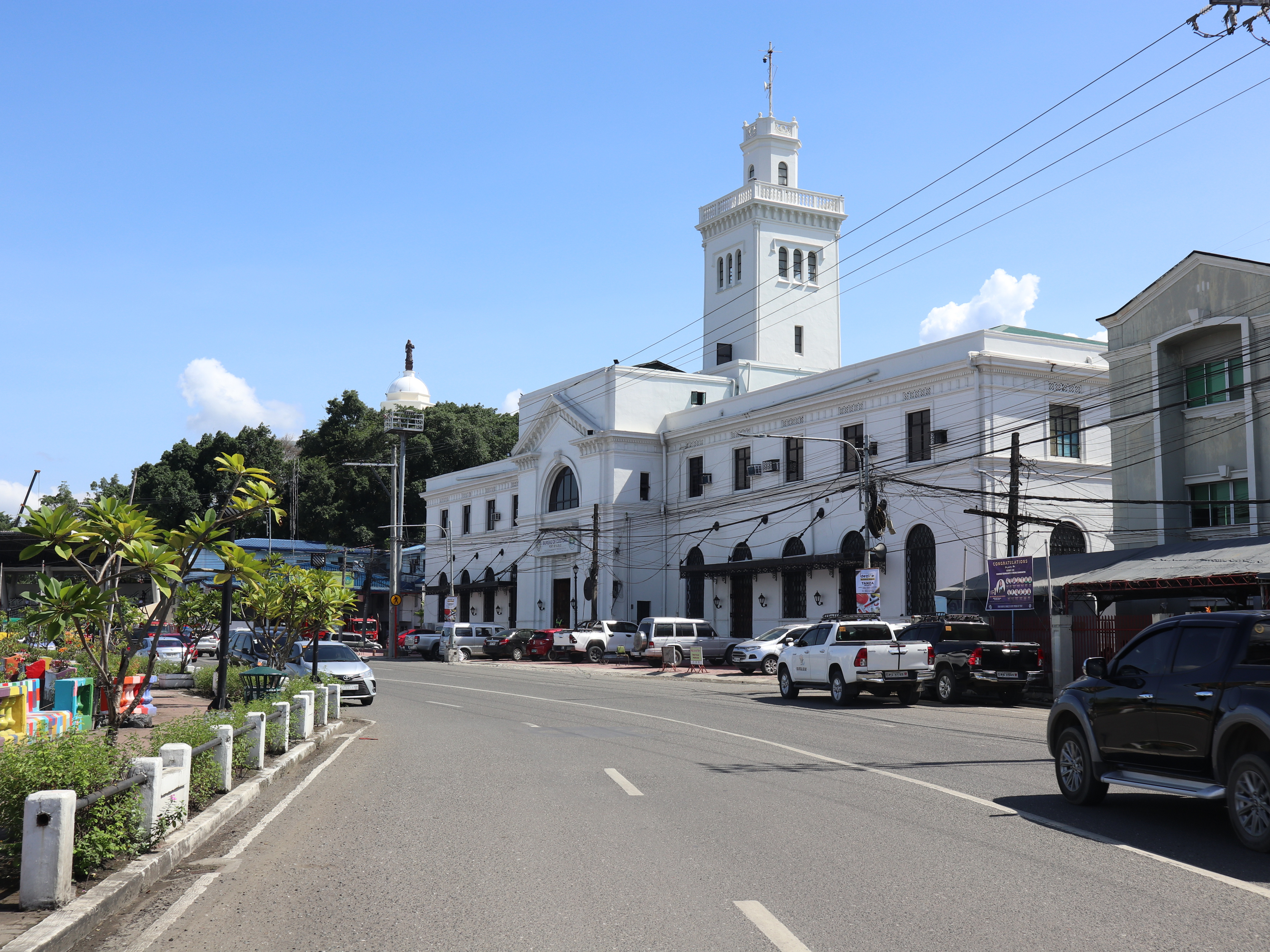
- Muelle Loney Street looking towards the Iloilo Customs House
- Interactive map of Muelle Loney Street
- Namesake: Nicholas Loney
- Length: 3.18 km (1.98 mi)
- Location: Iloilo City, Philippines
- North end: Rizal Bridge
- Major junctions: N511 (Jocson Street); Arroyo Street
- South end: Fort San Pedro Drive

Muelle Loney Marginal Wharf Road, also known as Muelle Loney Street, is a street and wharf located in the Iloilo City Proper district of Iloilo City, Philippines. It runs along the south bank of the Iloilo River, stretching from the Muelle Loney (Rizal) Bridge to Fort San Pedro Drive. During the Spanish colonial period, the street served as a prominent wharf and was one of the most important seaports in the Philippines. It played a significant role in the region's sugar industry, facilitating the transportation of sugar and other goods.

== History ==
In the 1700s to early 1800s, Iloilo developed a prosperous weaving industry, earning the title "Textile Capital of the Philippines." Its river wharf was established to export textiles to Manila. The region's sugar industry saw significant growth after the opening of the Iloilo Port to international trade in 1855 and the arrival of British vice-consul Nicholas Loney in 1856. Through his firm, Loney and Ker Co., Loney modernized sugar production by introducing European machinery and providing crop loans to local planters.

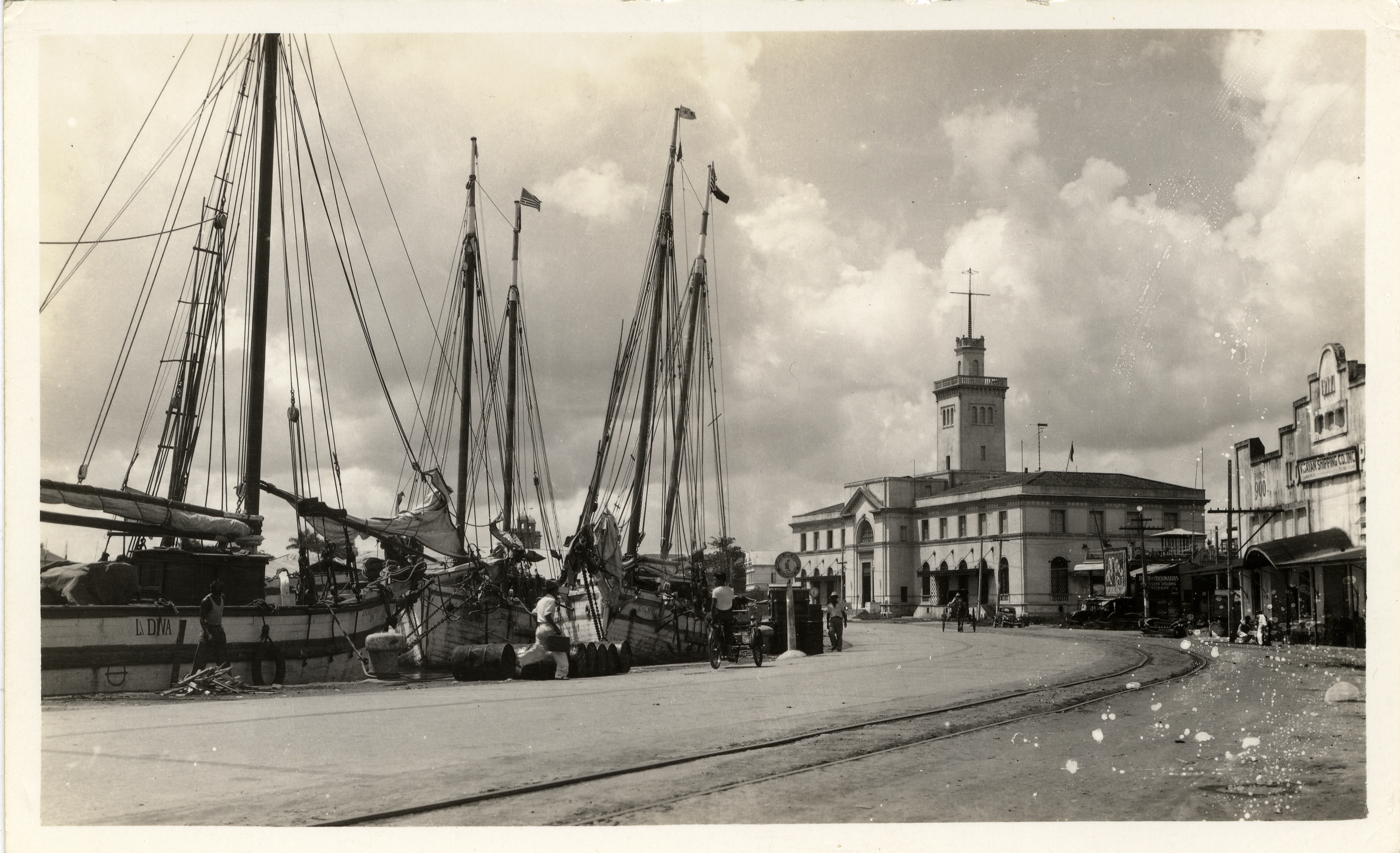
Iloilo River wharf, circa 1920s to 1930s

As trade expanded, the Iloilo River Wharf became a key port, helping transform Iloilo into a major business seaport. During this period, Iloilo emerged as one of the most prosperous cities outside Manila. In recognition of Loney's contributions, the river wharf was named Muelle Loney in his honor, and he is regarded as the "Father of the Philippine Sugar Industry." A statue of Nicholas Loney stands on Muelle Loney Street to commemorate his legacy.

== Notable architectural structures ==
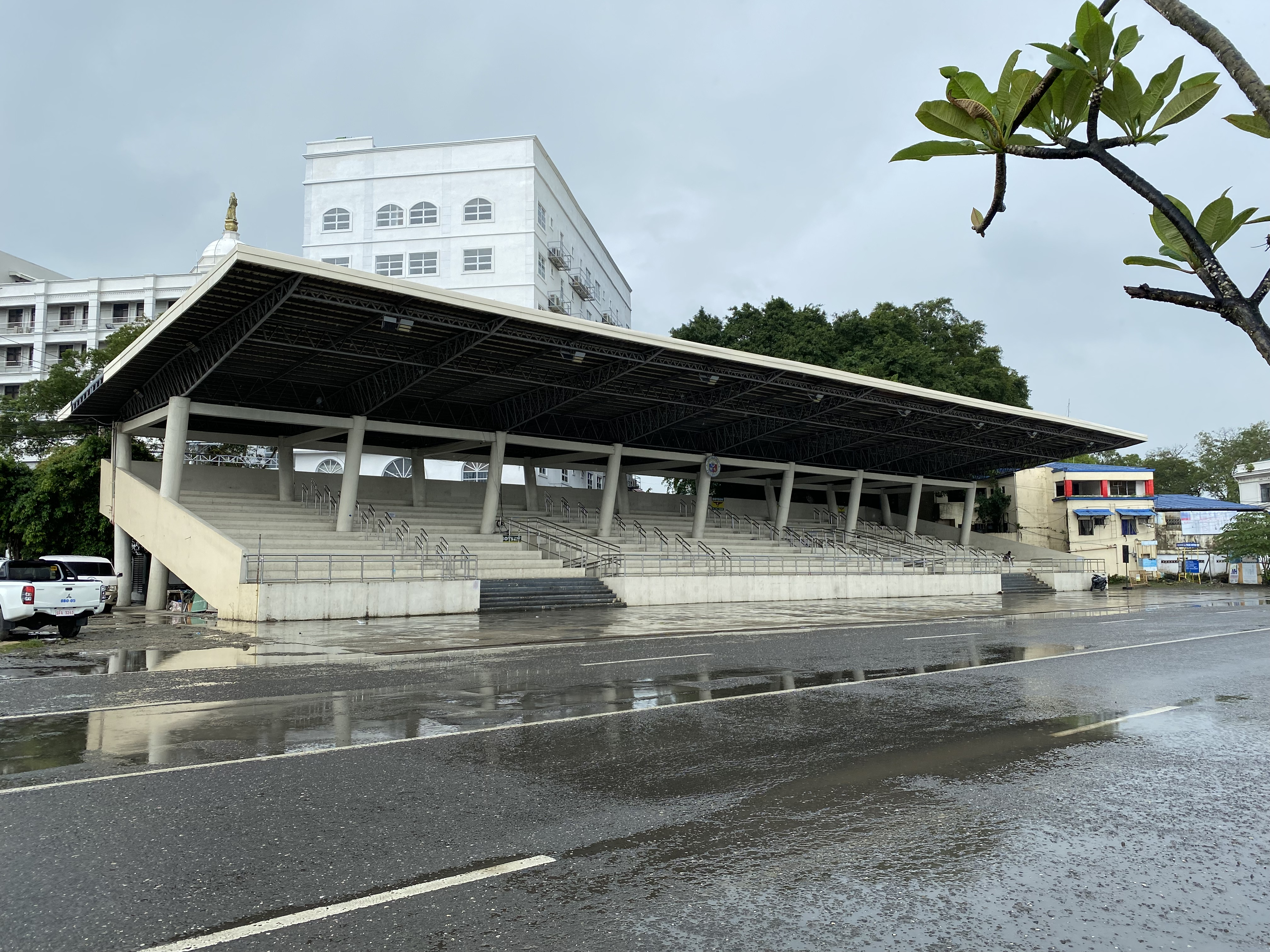
Iloilo Freedom Grandstand

Among the notable structures along the Muelle Loney Street area are:

- Iloilo Customs House (Muelle Loney Street)
- Casa Real de Iloilo (Jocson Street)
- Iloilo Provincial Capitol (Muelle Loney Street)
- National Museum of the Philippines – Iloilo (Muelle Loney Street)
- Iloilo Freedom Grandstand (Muelle Loney Street)
- Iloilo City Hall (Ortiz Street)
- Ker & Co. Building (Ortiz Street)
- Chief Justice Ramon Q. Avanceña Hall of Justice (Bonifacio Drive)
