= Iloilo Customs House =

Historical building and museum in Iloilo City, Philippines

- Aduana de Iloílo (Spanish)
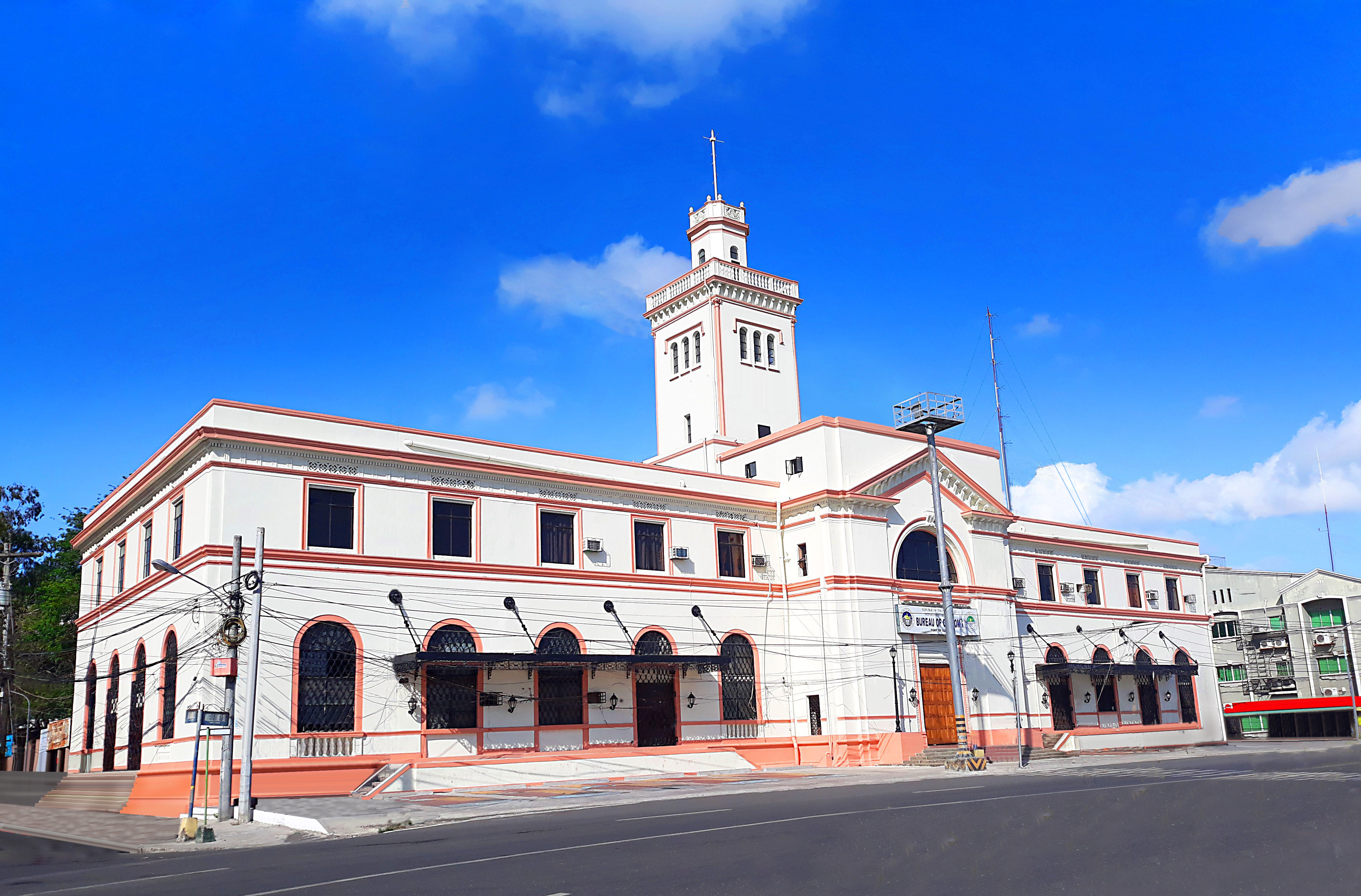
- The façade facing the Iloilo River (2018)
- Alternative names: Adwana sang Iloilo (Hiligaynon)

General information
- Status: Active
- Type: Government building; museum
- Architectural style: Neoclassical
- Location: Muelle Loney Street corner Aduana Street, Iloilo City Proper, Iloilo City, Philippines
- Coordinates: 10°41′39″N 122°34′20″E
- Completed: 1916

Design and construction
- Architect: Ralph Harrington Doane

Museum of Philippine Maritime History
- Museo sang Kasaysayan sang Dagat sang Pilipinas (Hiligaynon); Museo ng Kasaysayang Pandagat ng Pilipinas (Filipino)
- Logo

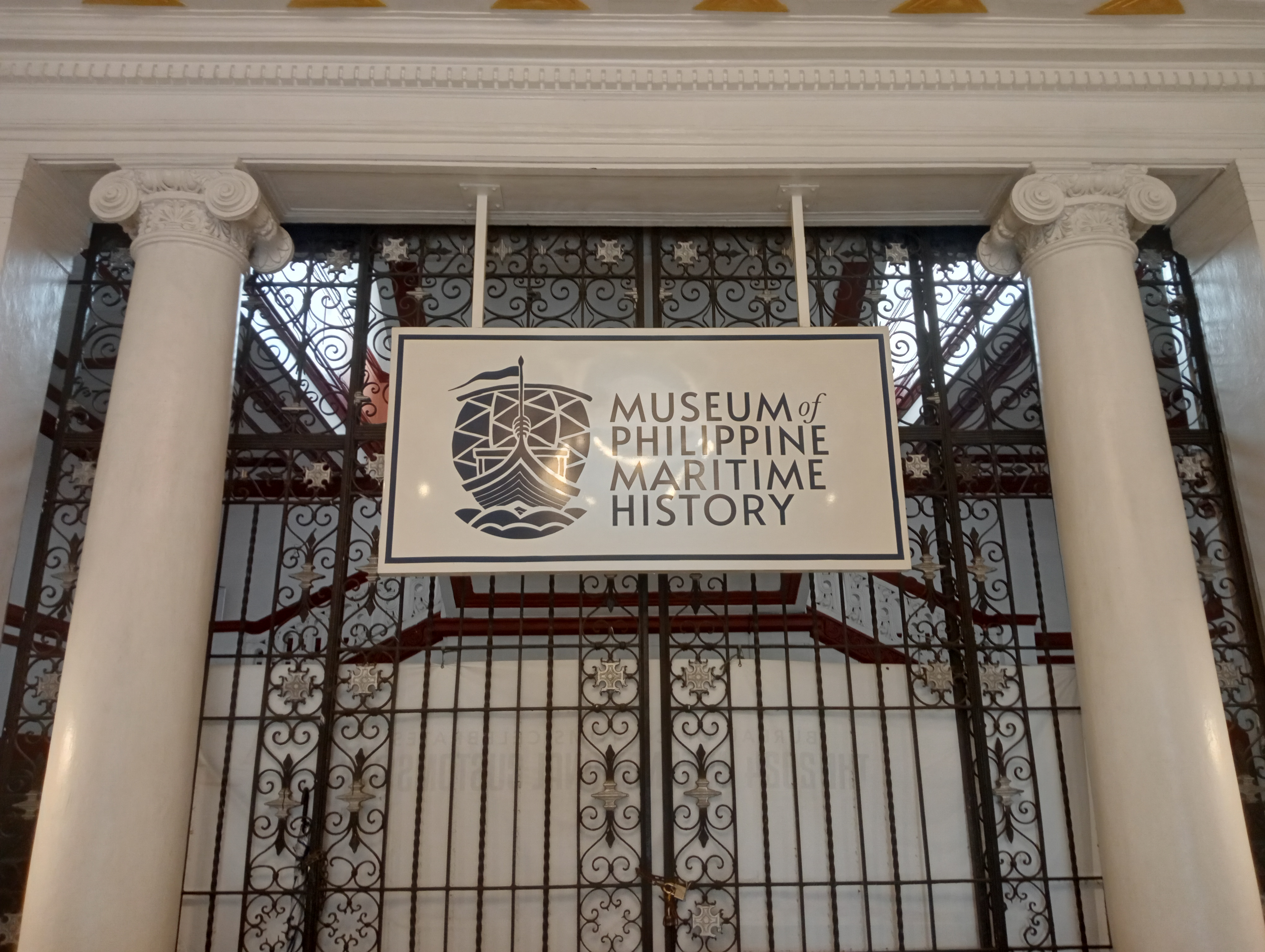
- Interior of the museum
- Established: 2023
- Location: Iloilo Customs House, Muelle Loney Street corner Aduana Street, Iloilo City Proper, Iloilo City, Philippines
- Type: Museum
- Owner: National Historical Commission of the Philippines

The Iloilo Customs House (Spanish: Aduana de Iloílo; Hiligaynon: Adwana sang Iloilo) is a historic building in Iloilo City, Philippines. It was built in 1916 to a design by American architect Ralph Harrington Doane, then Consulting Architect of the Bureau of Public Works in the Philippine Islands. Among the three American-era customs houses in the Philippines, it is the second largest (after Manila's) and second oldest (after Cebu's, now known as Malacañang sa Sugbo). The building is located at Muelle Loney Street and Aduana Street along the Iloilo River and still houses the offices of the Bureau of Customs and the Bureau of Immigration in Iloilo City.

At present, the Iloilo Customs House houses the Museum of Philippine Maritime History (Hiligaynon: Museo sang Kasaysayan sang Dagat sang Pilipinas; Filipino: Museo ng Kasaysayang Pandagat ng Pilipinas) of National Historical Commission of the Philippines (NHCP) at the ground floor and the office of Bureau of Customs at the upper ground floor.

== History ==
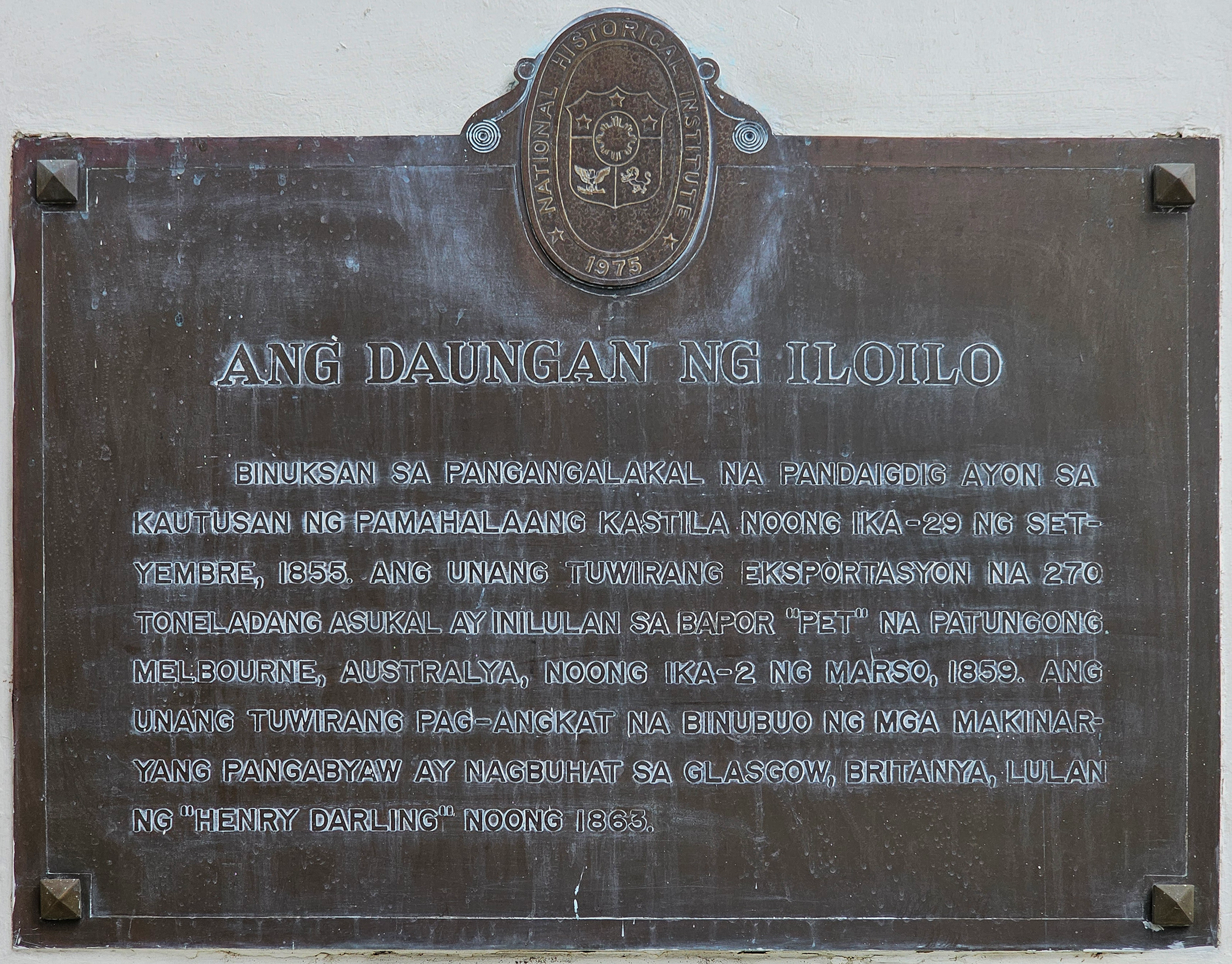
Daungan ng Iloilo (Port of Iloilo) historical marker

The Iloilo Customs House was built in 1916, during the American colonial period in the Philippines. It was then referred to as the Iloilo Customhouse, completed with an original appropriation of ₱200,000, plus an additional appropriation of ₱33,000 in 1917. It is the second custom house built by the Americans after the Cebu Customs House (now known as Malacañang sa Sugbo) of 1910.

Planning for the new custom house of the port of Iloilo started in 1913, with Consulting Architect William E. Parsons initially overseeing the project. The new building was to rise west from the old Spanish-era custom house near the river.

After the departure of Parsons in 1914, the new Consulting Architect George C. Fenhagen took over in the preparation of building plans. Vol. 4 No. 2 of the Bureau of Public Works Bulletin (July 1915) described the circumstances leading to its construction:

The Consulting Architect has stated that plans for the customhouse will be, he hopes, finally completed about the 1st of August. The residents of Iloilo have become rather impatient for some evidence of this structure. Assurance has been given, however, that work will be started immediately upon the receipt of the plans and it is hoped that nothing further will prevent its being started at an early date.

Ralph Harrington Doane replaced Fenhagen as Consulting Architect in 1916, and prepared the final architectural plans of the building. Doane was very critical of Parsons' work in the islands, and endeavored to improve the aesthetics i.e. ornamentation of public buildings. Among his oeuvre are the Pangasinan Provincial Capitol and the National Museum of Fine Arts (Manila).

In 2018, the building underwent rehabilitation by National Historical Commission of the Philippines (NHCP).

The building currently houses the Museum of Philippine Maritime History by the National Historical Commission of the Philippines which opened on January 13, 2023. It is the third thematic history museum in the Visayas after the NHCP Museum of Philippine Political History and Presidential Gallery in Cebu City and the NHCP Museum of Philippine Economic History, also in Iloilo City.

== Architecture ==
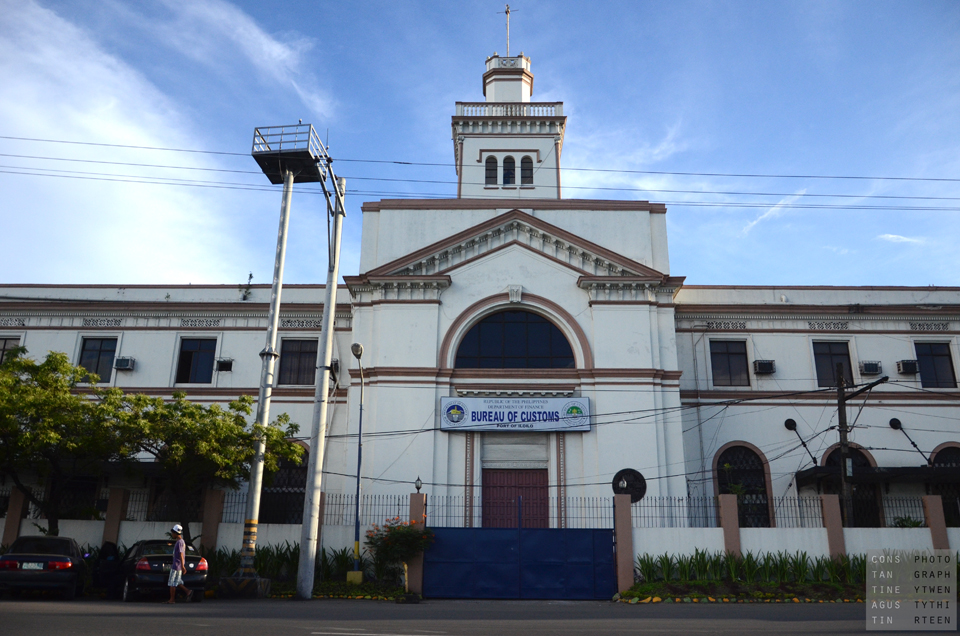
Façade of the customs house, featuring its neoclassical architecture

The architectural style of the Iloilo Customs House is neoclassical, with a dominant central tower. The Manila Customs House, designed by Juan Arellano and constructed towards the end of the American colonial period, is a more ornate version.

Filipino architect Tomas Mapua is often erroneously credited for its design, although he only entered service in the Bureau of Public Works in 1917, when the building was already substantially completed, and as an assisting architect (together with Juan Arellano) to the new Consulting Architect, Ralph Harrington Doane.

== See also ==
- Aduana Building (Manila Customs House)
- Museum of Philippine Economic History
- Museum of Philippine Political History
