= List of Cultural Properties of the Philippines in Western Visayas =

This list contains an overview of the government recognized Cultural Properties of the Philippines in Western Visayas. The list is based on the official lists provided by the National Commission on Culture and the Arts, National Historical Commission of the Philippines and the National Museum of the Philippines.

| Cultural Property wmph identifier (Note: wmph is an internal identifier used by Wikimedia Philippines to identify the monument. This is not an official identifier, and only shown temporarily in the templates until the government creates an updated complete list.) | Site name | Description | Province | City or municipality | Address | Coordinates | Image |
|---|---|---|---|---|---|---|---|
| PH-06-0001 | Kalantiaw Shrine | | Aklan | Batan | | 11°35′13″N 122°29′43″E | Upload Photo |
| PH-06-0002 | General Leandro Fullon Shrine | | Antique | Hamtic | | 10°42′02″N 121°58′52″E | Upload file |
| PH-06-0003 | Anini-y Church | | Antique | Anini-y | | 10°25′50″N 121°55′32″E | Upload file |
| PH-06-0004 | Old Patnongon Church and Convent | | Antique | Patnongon | | 10°54′48″N 121°59′34″E | Upload file |
| PH-06-0005 | Leandro Fullon Birthplace | | Antique | Hamtic | | | Upload Photo |
| PH-06-0006 | Panay Church | | Capiz | Panay | | 11°33′21″N 122°47′37″E | More images |
| PH-06-0007 | Roca Encantada House | | Guimaras | Buenavista | | 10°44′33″N 122°40′46″E | Upload file |
| PH-06-0008 | Barotac Nuevo Church, Convent and Cemetery | | Iloilo | Barotac Nuevo | | 10°53′42″N 122°42′15″E | Upload file |
| PH-06-0009 | Dumangas Church | | Iloilo | Dumangas | | | Upload file |
| PH-06-0010 | Ermita Chapel | | Iloilo | Dumangas | | | Upload Photo |
| PH-06-0011 | Fort Nuestra Señora del Rosario | | Iloilo | Iloilo City | | | Upload Photo |
| PH-06-0012 | Plaza Libertad | | Iloilo | Iloilo City | Zamora Street | 10°41′33″N 122°34′25″E | Upload file |
| PH-06-0013 | Old Iloilo City Hall | | Iloilo | Iloilo City | | | Upload file |
| PH-06-0014 | Rosendo Mejica Historical Landmark | | Iloilo | Iloilo City | | | Upload file |
| PH-06-0015 | Old Iloilo Capitol | | Iloilo | Iloilo City | Bonifacio Drive | | Upload file |
| PH-06-0016 | Port of Iloilo | | Iloilo | Iloilo City | Iloilo Customs House (Aduana) | | Upload file |
| PH-06-0017 | Balantang Memorial Cemetery National Shrine | | Iloilo | Iloilo City | | | Upload Photo |
| PH-06-0018 | Hechanova House | | Iloilo | Iloilo City | | | Upload file |
| PH-06-0019 | Jaro Belfry | | Iloilo | Iloilo City | | | More images |
| PH-06-0020 | Jaro Cathedral | | Iloilo | Iloilo City | | | Upload file |
| PH-06-0021 | San Vicente Ferrer Seminary | | Iloilo | Iloilo City | | | Upload file |
| PH-06-0022 | Lopez Heritage House | | Iloilo | Iloilo City | | | Upload file |
| PH-06-0023 | Molo Church | | Iloilo | Iloilo City | | | More images |
| PH-06-0024 | Old Iloilo City Hall | | Iloilo | Iloilo City | University of the Philippines Visayas City Campus | | Upload file |
| PH-06-0025 | Miagao Church | | Iloilo | Miag-ao | | | More images |
| PH-06-0026 | San Joaquin Church | | Iloilo | San Joaquin | | | Upload file |
| PH-06-0027 | Santa Barbara Golf Course | | Iloilo | Santa Barbara | | | Upload file |
| PH-06-0028 | Church and Convent of Santa Barbara Historical Landmark | | Iloilo | Santa Barbara | | | More images |
| PH-06-0029 | Central Philippine University | | Iloilo | Iloilo City | | | More images |
| PH-06-0030 | Colegio de San Jose | | Iloilo | Iloilo City | | | Upload file |
| PH-06-0031 | Iloilo School of Arts and Trade | | Iloilo | Iloilo City | | | Upload Photo |
| PH-06-0032 | West Visayas State University | | Iloilo | Iloilo City | | | Upload file |

== See also ==
- List of historical markers of the Philippines in Western Visayas
