= List of historical markers of the Philippines in Western Visayas =

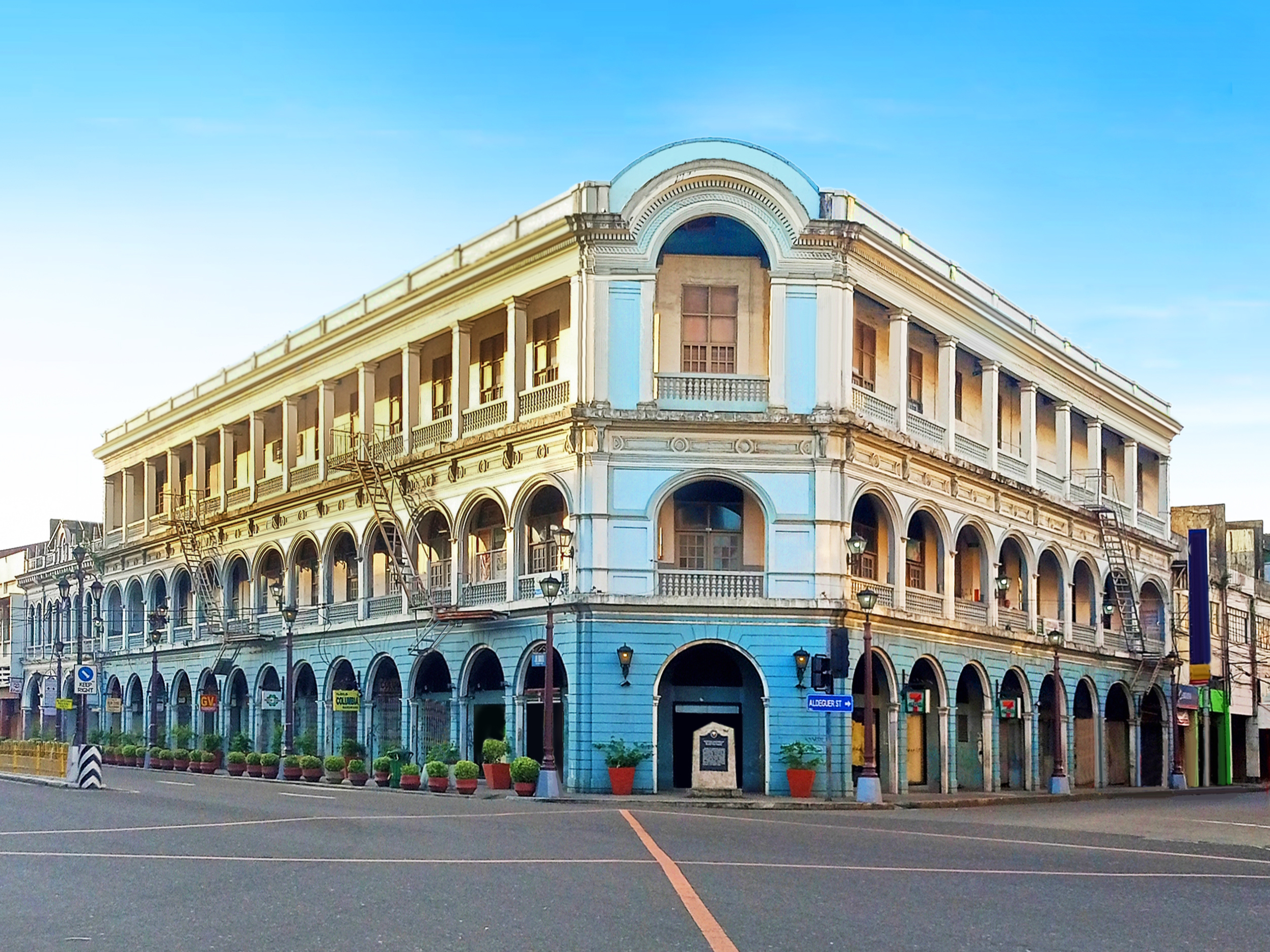
Eusebio Villanueva Building and Iloilo commercial heritage district marker

This list of historical markers installed by the National Historical Commission of the Philippines (NHCP) in Western Visayas (Region VI) is an annotated list of people, places, or events in the region that have been commemorated by cast-iron plaques issued by the said commission. The plaques themselves are permanent signs installed in publicly visible locations on buildings, monuments, or in special locations.

While many Cultural Properties have historical markers installed, not all places marked with historical markers are designated into one of the particular categories of Cultural Properties.

This historical marker for The Code of Kalantiaw in Batan, installed on December 8, 1956, remained in place after William Henry Scott in 1968 proved that Datu Kalantiaw was a hoax and through a resolution that was issued by the National Historical Institute (NHI) in 2004.

This article lists 101 markers from the Western Visayas region.

== Aklan ==
This article lists 22 markers from the province of Aklan.

Marker title	Description	Location	Language	Date issued	Image
(untitled)	Death site of Gen. Francisco del Castillo, leader of Aklan revolutionaries.	Kalibo	English	February 18, 1952	
(untitled)	Nineteen Martyrs of Aklan, patriots and defenders of liberty, executed on March 23, 1897.	Acevedo Building, Kalibo	English	1952	
Altavas	Established as a town in 1862. Became the capital of Capiz during the Japanese occupation.	Altavas Municipal Hall, Altavas	Filipino	June 18, 1992	
Archbishop Gabriel M. Reyes	First archbishop of Cebu. First consecrated Filipino archbishop of Manila on March 19, 1950.	Kalibo (lost)	English	1957	
Bayan ng Batan (Note: Town of Batan)	A center of trade during the pre-Spanish era. Became an independent town in 1789.	Batan	Filipino	December 8, 1992	
Birthplace of Most Reverend Gabriel Martelino Reyes, D.D		CAP Building, Kalibo	English		
Candido Iban	Aklanon revolutionary, helped to produce pamphlets and newspapers for the Katipunan.	Malinao		October 3, 2013	
The Code of Kalantiaw	1433 penal code in the Philippines enacted by Datu Bendahara Kalantiaw (today considered as a historical hoax).	Batan	English	December 8, 1956	
Francisco del Castillo	Revolutionary leader, led the Battle of Kalibo when he died March 17, 1897.	Kalibo	Filipino	April 25, 2019	
Cardinal Jaime Sin	Archbishop of Manila (1974-2003), hero of People Power I and II.	New Washington	Filipino	2007	
Jose Cortes Altavas	Part of the revolutionary forces of Capiz. Became representative to the Asamblea Filipina in 1907 and senator in 1916.	Altavas Monument, Altavas	Filipino	January 25, 2018	
Gabriel M. Reyes	First Filipino archbishop of Manila, October 14, 1949.	Kalibo	Filipino	March 24, 2022	
Kapitan Gil M. Mijares	One of the Aklanon heroes of World War II. Executed by the Japanese in 1994.	Kalibo	Filipino	November 3, 2006	
Koronel Pastor C. Martelino	One of the Aklanon heroes of World War II. Became part of the Death March, but escaped to become a guerrilla in Manila. First Filipino superintendent of the Philippine Military Academy.	Camp Pastor Martelino, Kalibo	Filipino	November 3, 2006	
Memorare	Dedicated to the Aklanon Katipuneros who died during the Revolution.	Kalibo	Filipino	April 25, 2019	
Labingsiyam na Martir ng Aklan	Executed under orders of Colonel Ricardo Monet on March 23, 1897.	Kalibo	Filipino	April 25, 2019	
Macario L. Peralta, Jr. 30 Hulyo 1913 – 30 Disyembre 1965 (Note: Macario L. Peralta, Jr.: 30 July 1913 – 30 December 1965)	Filipino commander during World War II. Secretary of the Department of National Defense from 1962 to 1965.	Aklan Provincial Capitol Grounds, Kalibo	Filipino	July 30, 2013	
Memorare	Dedicated to the Nineteen Martyrs of Aklan. Centenary dedication.	Kalibo	English	March 24, 1997	
Pagdakip Kay Heneral Ananias Diokno (Note: Capture of General Ananias Diokno)	Where Ananias Diokno was captured by the Americans in 1901.	Altavas	Filipino	August 30, 2013	
Simbahan ng Malinao (Note: Church of Malinao)	Became a parish of San Jose under the Diocese of Cebu.	Malinao	Filipino	April 30, 2019	
Sanduguan (Pacto de Sangre) (Note: Blood Pact)	Where Katipuneros signed a blood compact to fight against the Spaniards.	Sitio Kuntang, Brgy. Ochando, New Washington	Filipino	March 2, 2015	
Victorino Mapa; 1855–1927	Legal adviser to the Philippine revolutionary government. Supreme Court chief 1920 - 1921.	Glowmoon Hotel, Kalibo	English	1964	

== Antique ==
This table lists 11 markers from the province of Antique.

Marker title	Description	Location	Language	Date issued	Image
Bahay na Bato in Antique	Declared heritage house.	Gobierno Street, San Jose de Buenavista	English	February 2, 2021	
Hantique Igcabuhi	Established by Augustinians in the town of Hamtic in 1581. Became the province of Antique when the province was carved in 1790 from parts of Iloilo and Capiz.	Hamtic Church Plaza	Filipino	1965	
Bugasong	Started as an encomienda of Pedro Guillen in 1591. Became the capital of Aklan from 1790 to 1802.	Bugasong	Filipino	January 17, 1992	
Calixto O. Zaldivar Hall of Justice	Named after Calixto Zaldivar, the first Antiqueño who became a justice to the Supreme Court.	San Jose de Buenavista	English	October 13, 2000	
Casa Tribunal de Patnongon	Started to be built in 1874 and served as Patnongon's municipal hall; restored by the National Historical Commission of the Philippines in 2025.	Patnongon	Filipino	August 29, 2025	
Evelio B. Javier	Antique governor. Assassinated while guarding the ballots during the snap presidential election.	San Jose de Buenavista	Filipino	February 11, 2006	
Leandro Locsin Fullon	Revolutionary general that liberated many towns in Antique, collaborated with Gen. Martin Delgado in Panay.	Hamtic Public Plaza	Filipino	March 13, 2024	
Leandro Locsin Fullon	Revolutionary general that liberated many towns in Antique, collaborated with Gen. Martin Delgado in Panay.	Brgy. Bagumbayan, Antique–Aklan Road cor. Pandan–Libertad–Aklan Boundary Road, Pandan	Filipino	September 21, 2026	
Ang Lumang Simbahan at Kumbento ng Patnongon (Note: The Old Church and Convent of Patnongon)	Built in 1860 by P. Manuel Asensio, OSA. Finished in 1895 under P. Eustaquio Heria.	Patnongon	Filipino	February 25, 2008	
Pook na Pinanganakan ni Leandro Fullon (Note: Birthplace of Leandro Fullon)	Leandro Locsin Fullon, revolutionary general was born on this site on March 13, 1874.	Hamtic	Filipino	March 13, 2004	
Simbahan ng Anini-y (Note: Church of Anini-y)	First built by the Augustinians from 1630 to 1638 in a nearby site. The current church was made of corals and was constructed in 1845.	Anini-y	Filipino	August 5, 2004	

== Capiz ==
This table lists six markers from the province of Capiz.

Marker title	Description	Location	Language	Date issued	Image
Birthplace of Manuel Acuña Roxas	Birthplace of the last president of the Commonwealth, from 1946 to 1948.	Roxas City	English	1958	
Church of Pan-Ay	First church established in 1774. Houses the biggest bell in the Philippines, measuring seven feet in diameter.	Pan-Ay	English	December 6, 1997	
Filamer Christian University	Established in August 1904 by American Baptist Missionaries Rev. Joseph C. Robbins and his wife. The university was closed and served as garrison during World War II.	Roxas City	Filipino	August 12, 2014	
Kapitolyo ng Capiz (Note: Capitol of Capiz)	First built of wood. First finished in 1911. Third floor added from 1945 to 1949.	Roxas City	Filipino	April 22, 2022	
Manuel Acuña Roxas (1892–1948)	Orator, statesman, economist, and nationalist. Fifth president of the Philippines.	Roxas City	English	2011	
Memorare	In memory of Gen. Esteban Contreras and revolutionaries who participated in the battles of Tadiao, Lahab, Pan-ay, and Balisong.	Pontevedra	English	May 4, 1997	

== Guimaras ==
This table lists one marker from the province of Guimaras.

Marker title	Description	Location	Language	Date issued	Image
Roca Encantada	Declared as a heritage house by the NHCP.	Buenavista	English	March 28, 2004	

== Iloilo ==
This table lists 61 markers from the Province of Iloilo.

Marker title	Description	Location	Language	Date issued	Image
Adriano Dayot Hernandez (1870–1925)	Leader of the National Forces of the Visayas in March 1899. Became the first Filipino director of Bureau of Agriculture.	General Adriano Dayot Hernández Monument, Dingle Town Plaza, Dingle	Filipino	2008	
Bahay Kalakal ng Ker & Company Ltd. (Note: Trade Building of Ker & Company Ltd.)	Established in Manila in 1827. Had a branch in 1862 in Iloilo which was the primary financier of machines for sugarcane.	Ortiz St., Iloilo City Proper, Iloilo City.	Filipino	July 24, 2018	
Bahay Kalakal ng Ynchausti y Compañia (Note: Trade Building of Ynchausti & Company)	Built as a branch of Ynchausti & Company in 1905 trading sugar, abaca, liquor, and paints.	Museum of Philippine Economic History, Calle Real, Iloilo City	Filipino	February 11, 2019	
Ang Bahay ni Hechanova (Note: The House of Hechanova)	Historic house of World War II guerrillas headed by Macario Peralta.	Gran Plains Subdivision, Jaro, Iloilo City	Filipino	1984	
Mga Bantayan ng Guimbal (Note: Guimbal Watchtowers)	Built by the Spaniards against Dutch attacks.	Brgy. Rizal-Taguisan, Guimbal	Filipino	April 10, 2026	
Ang Bayan ng Alimodian (Note: The Town of Alimodian)	Established by Augustinian priests in 1754. Became an independent town in 1918 from Leon. Hundreds of people were massacred by the Japanese.	Alimodian	Filipino		
Bayan ng Oton (Note: The Town of Oton)	One of the oldest pueblos in Iloilo. One of the center of trade and commerce in the Visayas from 12th century up to the coming of the Spaniards. Former capital of the Province of Ogtong.	Oton Municipal Hall, Oton	Filipino	May 3, 2013	
Battle of Balantang	Bloodiest battle fought by the Panay guerilla forces led by Col. Macario Peralta, Jr. in WWII.	Balantang Memorial Cemetery National Shrine, Jaro, Iloilo City	English	March 18, 1998	
Casa de España de Iloilo	Built under the design of Tomás Mapúa in 1926, partly damaged during WWII.	Iloilo City Proper, Iloilo City	Filipino, English	October 6, 2026	
Celso Ledesma Mansion	Declared as a heritage house by the NHCP.	Celso Ledesma Mansion, Ortiz Street, Iloilo City	English	May 15, 2025	
Central Philippine University	Established in 1905 under the American Baptist Foreign Mission Society as Jaro Industrial School by William Valentine, and organized the first student governing body in South East Asia, the Central Philippine University Republic in 1906.	Jaro, Iloilo City	Filipino	September 19, 1980	
Church and Convent of Barotac		Barotac Nuevo			
Colegio de San Jose	Opened on May 1, 1872. Permission to also operate as a high school granted in 1926.	Jaro, Iloilo City	English	1939	
Koronel Quintin Salas (Note: Colonel Quintin Salas)	Leader of the Dumangas uprising on October 28, 1898. Considered as the last standing leader who surrendered to the Americans in the Visayas.	Dumangas	Filipino	October 31, 1972	
Ang Daungan ng Iloilo (Note: The Port of Iloilo)	Iloilo opened its doors to world trade under the decree of the Spanish government on September 29, 1855.	Custom House, Iloilo City Proper, Iloilo City	Filipino	September 29, 1975	
Distritong Pangkomersyo ng Lungsod ng Iloilo Bilang Pook Pamana (Note: Commercial District of City of Iloilo as Heritage Site)	Center of commerce that opened in the 20th century and paved the way for the sugar industry in the region.	Eusebio Villanueva Building, Calle Real, Iloilo City Proper, Iloilo City	Filipino	August 8, 2014	
Fort Nuestra Señora del Rosario	Site of Fort Nuestra Señora del Rosario. Built in 1617 as protection from pirates.	Fort San Pedro, Iloilo City Proper, Iloilo City	English	1949	
Graciano Lopez Jaena	First editor of La Solidaridad. Became part of the Propaganda Movement of 1882.	Fajardo St., Jaro, Iloilo City	Filipino	February 15, 1970	
Guho ng Kapilya ng Ermita (Note: Ruins of the Chapel of Ermita)	First built out of nipa when Araut was made as a center of evangelization in Panay.	Dumangas	Filipino	March 13, 2014	
Gusali ng Iloilo-Acacia Masonic Lodge No. 11 (Note: Iloilo-Acacia Masonic Lodge No. 11 Building)	Built under the leadership of WB Thomas N. Powell from 1927 to 1928. Used as a station of Japanese troops during WWII.	Masonic building, Calle Real, Plaza Libertad, Iloilo City Proper, Iloilo City	Filipino	February 9, 2018	
Heneral Martin Teofilo Delgado (Note: General Martin Teofilo Delgado)	A leader of the Philippine revolution in the Visayas. First governor of Iloilo under the Americans from 1901 to 1903.	Municipal Plaza, Sta. Barbara	Filipino	November 17, 1973	
Jose Soriano Araneta		Pavia Municapal Hall, Pavia			
Kampanaryo ng Jaro (Note: Jaro Belfry)	First built through corals and bricks, 1744.	Jaro Plaza, Jaro, Iloilo	Filipino	November 27, 2022	
Ang Kapilya ng Ermita (Note: The Chapel of Ermita)	Declared as a national historical landmark by the NHCP.	Dumangas	Filipino	August 28, 1989	
Ang Katedral ng Jaro, Iloilo (Note: The Cathedral of Jaro, Iloilo)	Built in 1874. Where Graciano Lopez-Jaena was baptized on December 20, 1856.	Jaro Cathedral, Jaro, Iloilo City	Filipino	December 1976	
Ledesma Ancestral House		Washington Street, Jaro, Iloilo City	English	February 7, 2023	
Lopez Ancestral House	Declared as a heritage house by the NHCP.	La Paz, Iloilo City	Filipino	March 28, 2004	
Macario L. Peralta, Jr. 30 Hulyo 1913 – 30 Disyembre 1965 (Note: Macario L. Peralta, Jr.: 30 July 1913 – 30 December 1965)	Established the Free Panay Guerilla Forces, July 1, 1942.	Sunburst Park, J.M. Basa Street, Iloilo City	Filipino	January 13, 2023	
Ang Mga Magbanua (Note: The Magbanuas)	Town where the Magbanuas came from, including Teresa Magbanua, heroine of Panay.	Pototan	Filipino	1974	
Magdalena G. Jalandoni; 1891–1978	Wrote 85 volumes of literary work. Received the Republic Cultural Heritage Award in Literature at the age of 16.	Jaro, Iloilo City	Filipino	1982	
Makasaysayang Simbahan ng San Joaquin (Note: Historic Church of San Joaquin)	Declared as a national historical landmark by the NHCP.	San Joaquin Church, San Joaquin	Filipino	November 22, 1979	
Marciano Araneta y Soriano	Revolutionary leader, one of the ones who established a cantonal government in Negros.				
Miagao Church	Construction began in 1787 and ended in 1797. It served as a fortress against Muslim raiders.	Miagao Church, Miagao	Filipino	February 16, 1963	
Nazaria Lagos (1851–1945)	Nurse who helped the sick and the wounded of the revolution.	Dueñas	Filipino	August 28, 1973	
Nicholas Loney (1826–1869)	Helped in the region's economic growth after Iloilo was opened as an international port.	Nicholas Loney Monument, Iloilo City Proper, Iloilo City	Filipino	1981	
Old Capitol Building of Iloilo	Once used as Casa Real by the Spaniards.Used by the Japanese forces from 1942 to 1945 during World War II.	Capitol Grounds, Iloilo City Proper. Iloilo City	Filipino	2010	
Old Iloilo City Hall	Inaugurated 1936. Property was given to the University of the Philippines.	University of the Philippines Visayas, Iloilo City Proper, Iloilo City	Filipino	2008	
Paaralang Pansining at Panghanapbuhay ng Iloilo (Note: Iloilo School of Arts and Trade)	Established in 1905 at Iznart Street. Damaged during World War II and was repaired after.	Iloilo Science and Technology University, La Paz, Iloilo City	Filipino	February 1980	
Pablo Araneta y Soriano (1865–1943)	A revolutionary leader. Became a commandant-general of the revolutionary forces in Iloilo.	Molo Convent, Molo, Iloilo City	Filipino	December 17, 1988	
Ang Pagpapalaya ng Isla ng Panay (Note: The Liberation of Panay Island)	The independence of Panay island was declared on March 22, 1945.	Sunburst Park, J.M. Basa Street, Iloilo City	Filipino	January 13, 2023	
Pamahalaang Mapanghimagsik ng Kabisayaan (1898) (Note: Revolutionary Government of the Visayas: 1898)	Site where the revolutionary government for Visayas and Mindanao was proclaimed.	Santa Barbara	Filipino	November 17, 1973	
Panay Landing	Panay liberation operation of World War II. The 40th Infantry Division, 8th U.S. Army landed here on March 19, 1945.	Tigbauan	English	1954	
Patrocinio Gamboa (1865–1953)	Revolutionary of Iloilo. Risked her life transferring the Philippine flag from Jaro to Santa Barbara.	Jaro Plaza, Jaro, Iloilo City	Filipino	December 21, 1980	
Patrocinio Gamboa	Revolutionary of Iloilo, unveiled in celebration of 150th birth anniversary.	Cor. Jayme and Commission Civil Sts., Brgy Benedicto, Jaro, Iloilo City	Filipino	April 30, 2015	
Plaza Libertad	Philippine flag was raised on this spot signaling end of Spanish rule.	Plaza Libertad, Iloilo City Proper, Iloilo City	Filipino	May 17, 2006	
Port of Iloilo	Iloilo opened its doors to world trade under the decree of the Spanish government on September 29, 1855.		English	September 29, 1975	
Rosendo Mejica (1873–1956)	One of the first publishers of Hiligaynon. Born on March 1, 1873.	Rosendo Mejica Ancestral House, Baluarte, Molo, Iloilo City	Filipino	1973	
Santa Barbara Golf Course	Oldest golf course in the country. Built by Scottish engineers from the Philippine Railway Company.	Sta. Barbara	Filipino	2007	
Sara, Iloilo (1877-1977)	Established by Augustinians in 1877. Became a regular parish in 1895.	Sara Municipal Building, Sara	Filipino	December 2, 1977	
Seminaryo ng San Vicente Ferrer (Note: Seminary of Saint Vincent Ferrer)	Established 1869. First building constructed in 1871. Reopened after World War II.	Jaro, Iloilo City	Filipino	1990	
Simbahan at Kumbento ng Santa Barbara (Note: Church and Convent of Santa Barbara)	Built in 1849. Used as a station of the revolutionary forces in their proclamation of the Revolutionary Government in Visayas under Martin Teófilo Delgado.	Santa Barbara	Filipino	2012	
Simbahan ng Dumangas (Note: Church of Dumangas)	Built with the convent of Fr. Martin de Rada, O.S.A., 1572. Designated as a national historical landmark by the NHCP.	Dumangas	Filipino	August 28, 1989	
Simbahan ng Leon (Note: Church of Leon)	First established as a visita of Tigbauan, 1730.	Leon Church, Leon	Filipino	May 7, 2023	
Simbahan ng Miagao (Note: Church of Miagao)	Designated as a national historical landmark by the NHCP.	Miagao Church, Miagao	Filipino	April 14, 1977	
Simbahan ng Molo (Note: Church of Molo)	Plans for a stone church laid out in 1866. Slightly damaged during World War II.	Molo, Iloilo City	Filipino	June 21, 1992	
Simbahan ng San Joaquin (Note: Church of San Joaquin)	Current church built between 1855-1869 out of coral stones by Fr. Tomas Santaren.	San Joaquin Church, San Joaquin	Filipino	December 15, 2015	
Sofia Reyes de Veyra (1876–1953)	Civic and feminist teacher. Became the vice president of Centro Escolar University from 1934 to 1953.	Villa Arevalo Plaza, Villa Arevalo, Iloilo City	Filipino	September 30, 1976	
Tigbauan	Established 1575 as a visita of Oton. Became a parish in 1580.	Tigbauan Church grounds, Tigbauan	Filipino	December 7, 1975	
Tomas Confesor	Economist and first director of the Department of Trade and Industry.	Cabatuan	Filipino	March 2, 1974	
Villa de Arevalo	Provincial capital in 1582. Was given the title "La Villa Rica de Arevalo."	Villa Arevalo Plaza, Villa Arevalo, Iloilo City	Filipino	December 11, 1981	
West Visayas State University	Established as Iloilo Normal school on June 16, 1902. Buildings were constructed in 1924.	La Paz, Iloilo City	Filipino	2007	

== See also ==
- List of Cultural Properties of the Philippines in Western Visayas

== Bibliography ==
- National Historical Institute (1994). Historical Markers: Regions V-XIII. National Historical Institute.
- National Historical Institute (2008). Historical Markers (1992 - 2006). National Historical Institute.
- A list of sites and structures with historical markers, as of 16 January 2012
- A list of institutions with historical markers, as of 16 January 2012
