= Sofia de Veyra =

Filipino feminist and educator

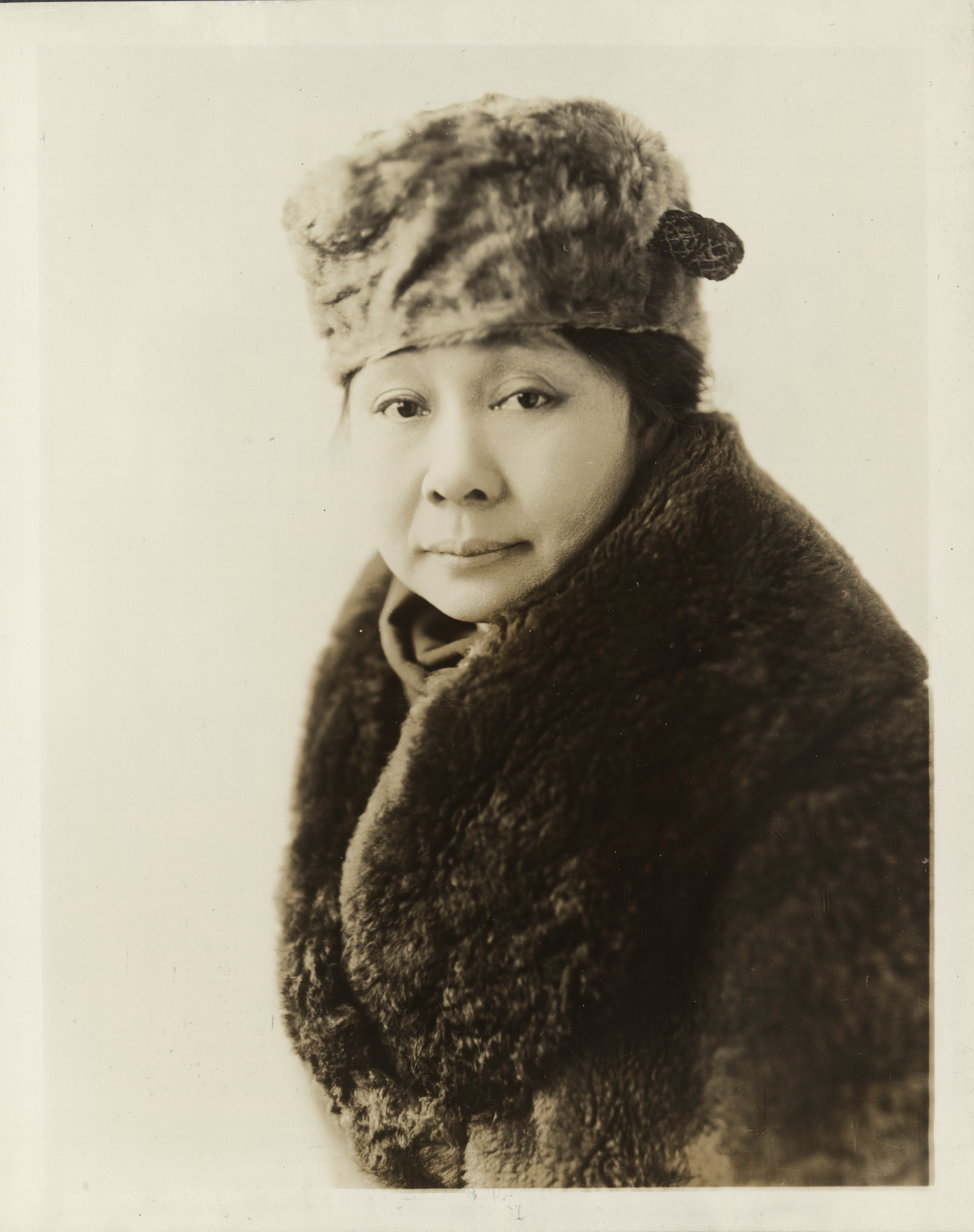
- Sofia de Veyra in 1921

Personal details
- Born: Sofia Tiaozon Reyes; September 30, 1876 Iloilo City, Iloilo, Captaincy General of the Philippines
- Died: January 1, 1953 (aged 76) Manila, Philippines
- Spouse: Jaime Carlos de Veyra
- Profession: Educator; Social welfare worker Activist

Sofia Tiaozon Reyes de Veyra (30 September 1876 – 1 January 1953) was an organizer of the first Filipino nursing schools and President of the National Federation of Women's Clubs which led the suffrage movement for women of the Philippines. She was a Filipina suffragette, social welfare worker, private secretary in the office of the President of the Philippines, teacher, school founder, and member of several government boards.

== Early life ==
Sofia Tiaozon Reyes was born in Arévalo, Iloilo (now a district of Iloilo City), the daughter of Santiago Reyes and Eulalia Tiaozon.

== Education ==
In the 1890s, she studied in a private school in Iloilo, run by the family of Chief Justice Ramón Avanceña. She worked as an assistant at the school to pay for her tuition, board and lodging. She studied in the last decade of the Spanish rule in the Philippines, resulting in her studies being in Castilian, which she notably excelled in. Following the Philippine–American War, she got an American teacher to instruct her in grammar and arithmetic, among other subjects.

After becoming Assistant Dean of Women at Philippine Normal University, de Veyra pursued further studies in Manila.

== Early career ==
De Veyra's studies led her to be one of the first Filipino teachers in Saravia (now Enrique B. Magalona), in Negros Occidental province. There she taught English. Later, with the establishment of the first Girls' Dormitory in Bacolod, Negros Occidental, she was made Matron.

In 1906, the Philippine Normal University de Veyra became Assistant Dean of Women at the University, and moved to Manila. That year, de Veyra helped organize the University's Normal Hall Dormitory, which trained the first Filipino nursing students and recruited young Filipinas from across the country. In 1907,She co-founded a nurses' training school at Iloilo City with an American woman, Mary E. Coleman.

She also co-wrote a cookbook that was published in both English and Spanish, Everyday Cookery for the Home (1930, 1934).

== Suffrage activism ==
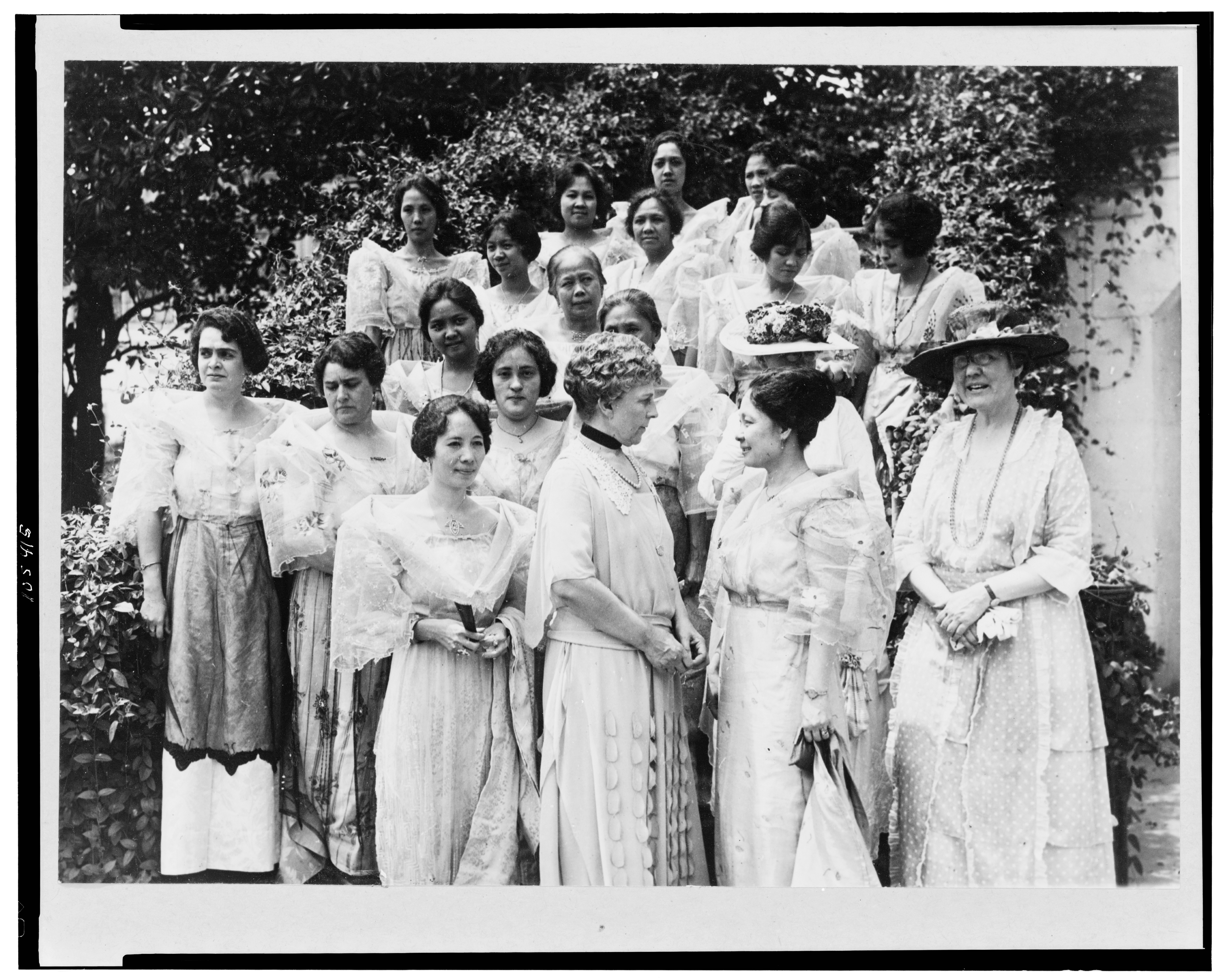
de Veyra and wives of the Second Philippine Parliamentary Mission received at White House by First Lady Florence Harding

In 1917, de Veyra moved to Washington, D.C. as a diplomat's wife, and while there gave lectures and was otherwise active in women's clubs. She wrote essays that were published in newspapers around the United States. Sofia de Veyra was also noted for wearing the distinctive Philippine terno formal dress to events and while giving public speeches in the United States.

De Veyra was one of the organizers of the first Woman's Club in the Philippines. The Womans Club headquartered in Manila. By 1920, de Veyra's Woman's Club operated a Day Nursery and a Flower market. It supported three women police matrons who cared for women pending trials. The Club ran a Woman's Free Employment Agency which aided destitute women. The club also formed the Little Mother's League, Civic Committee and provided free legal aid for indigent women through Filipina lawyers.

De Veyra later aided in the consolidating of all the woman's clubs and associations in the Philippines. On February 5, 1921, 300 women's associations established the National Federation of Women's Clubs of the Philippines.

In 1922, she attended the Pan-American Conference of Women held in Baltimore and spoke about the Philippines. She met with First Lady Florence Harding, and received a certificate of appreciation from the American Red Cross for her contributions during World War I. In 1922, de Veyra was a leader of a Filipina suffrage delegation that met with First Lady Harding.

Back in the Philippines by 1925, she founded the Manila Women's Club. In time, she became president of the National Federation of Women's Clubs, and used her position to advocate for women's suffrage in the Philippines. She was also appointed head of the domestic science department at Centro Escolar de Señoritas, a girls' school.

== Philippine independence ==
On January 22, 1930, de Veyra's name was included on The Independence Congress Manifesto as a recognized representative of the Filipino People. De Veyra held an official role in the Independence Congress as an officer of the congress and Chairman of the Women's Section.

At 9:30 A.M. February 26, 1930, de Veyra gave her opening remarks to the Independence Congress and later delivered a formal address.

== Personal life ==
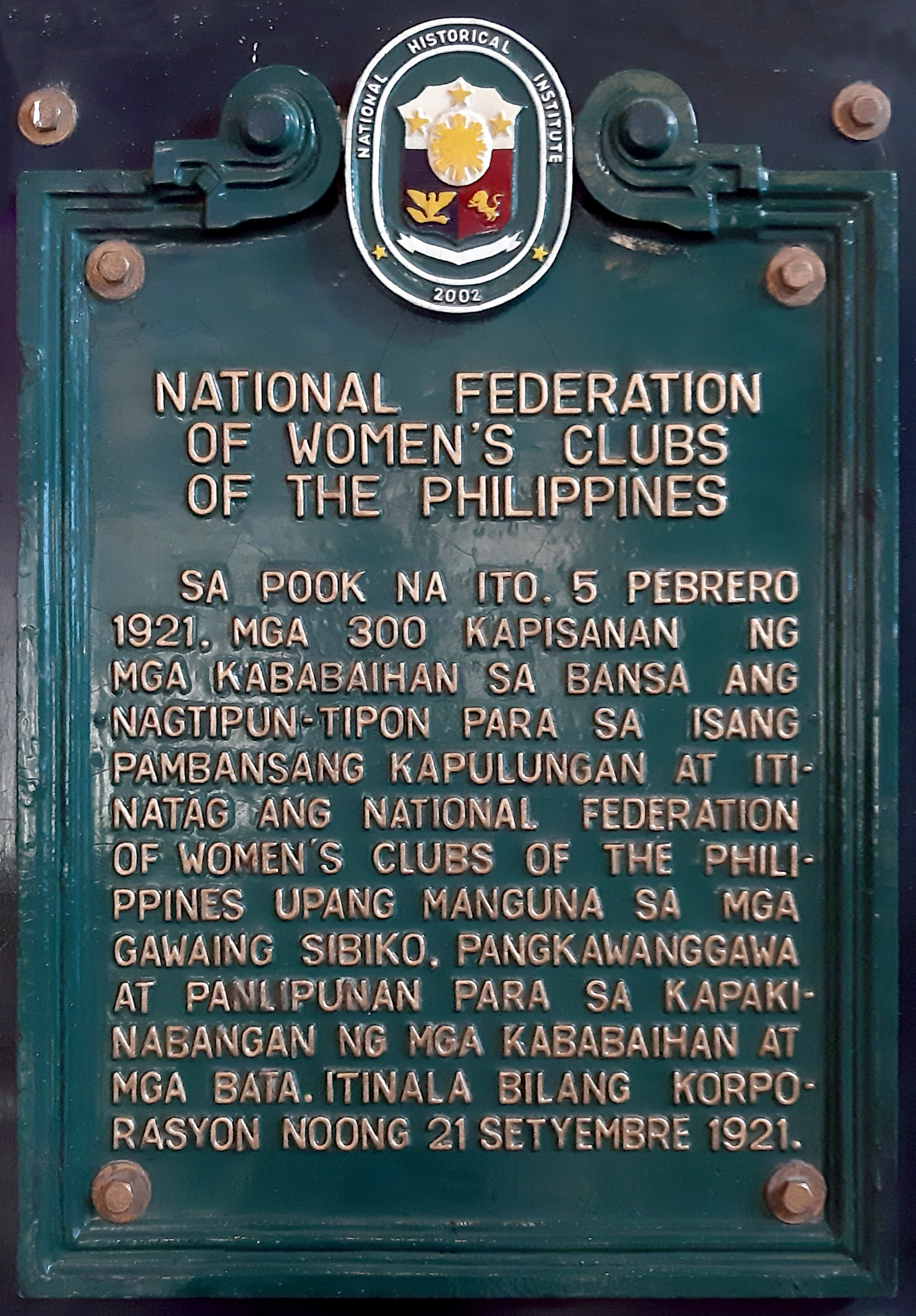
National Federation of Women's Clubs of the Philippines historical marker

In 1907, de Veyra married Jaime C. de Veyra. They had four children. Their son Manuel E. de Veyra was a doctor during World War II serving at Bataan. Their son Jesus de Veyra became a judge, and dean of the Ateneo Law School from 1976 to 1981.

De Veyra died in 1953 at the age of 77. Her daughter-in-law wrote a biography, Faith, Work, Success: An Appraisal of the Life and Work of Sofia Reyes de Veyra, in 1959. There is a historical marker honoring de Veyra's work in her home district in the Western Visayas region.

De Veyra was a transnational Asian/American activist that advocated for human rights in the Philippines and the United States. As the Philippines were under colonial control during the early 20th century, she dedicated her life in hope of revealing the limitations of colonialism and the need for equal gender rights.

== Gallery ==
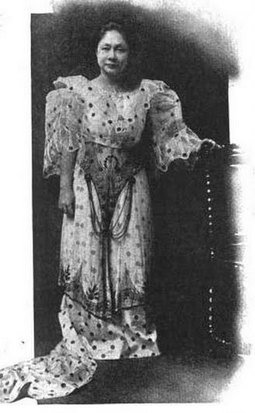
De Veyra in a 1919 publication

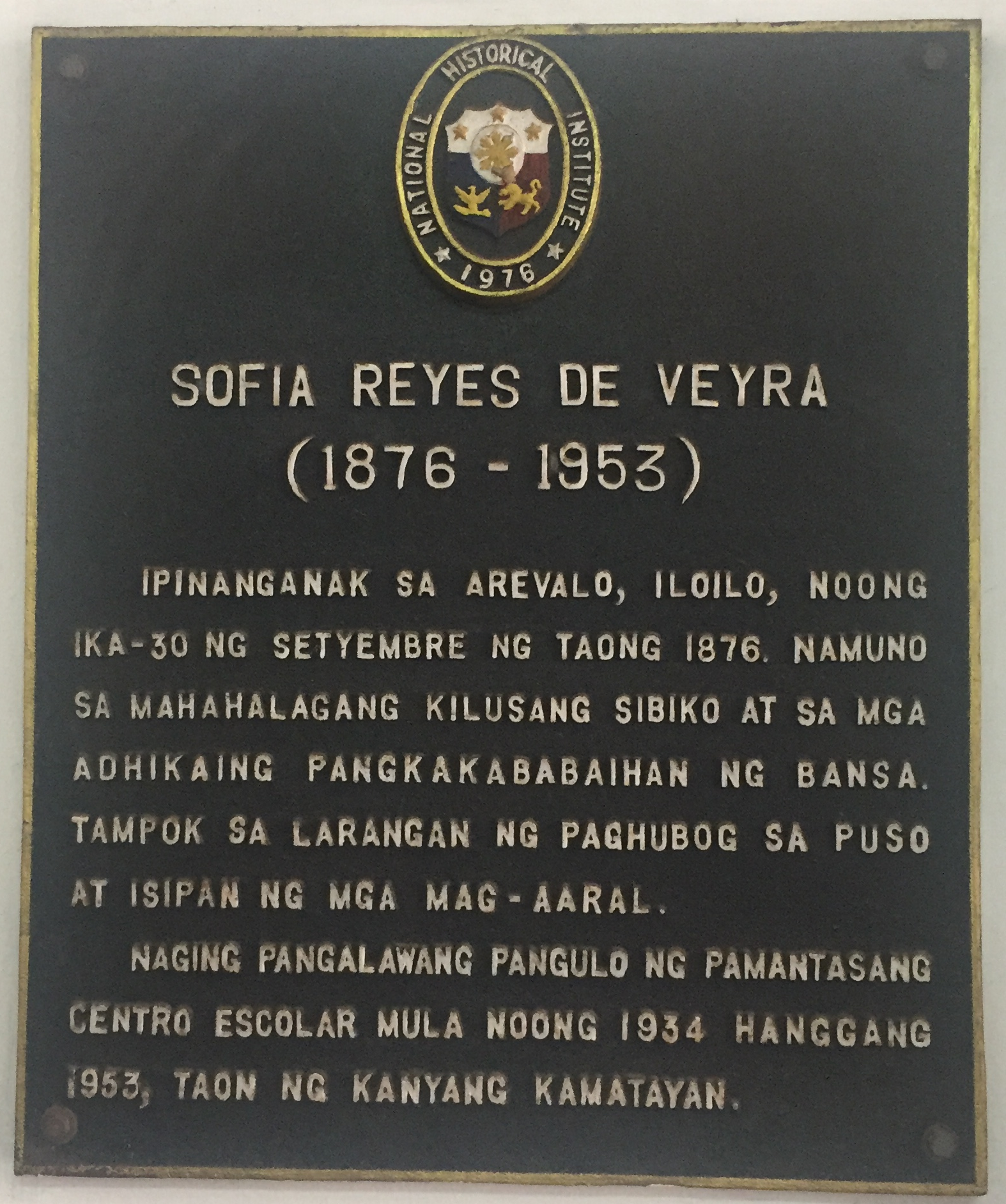
Biographical historical marker found inside the Centro Escolar University
