= Molo Church =

Roman Catholic church in Iloilo City, Philippines

- Santa Ana Parish of Molo
- Parokya ni Santa Ana ng Molo (Filipino); Parroquia de Santa Ana de Molo (Spanish)
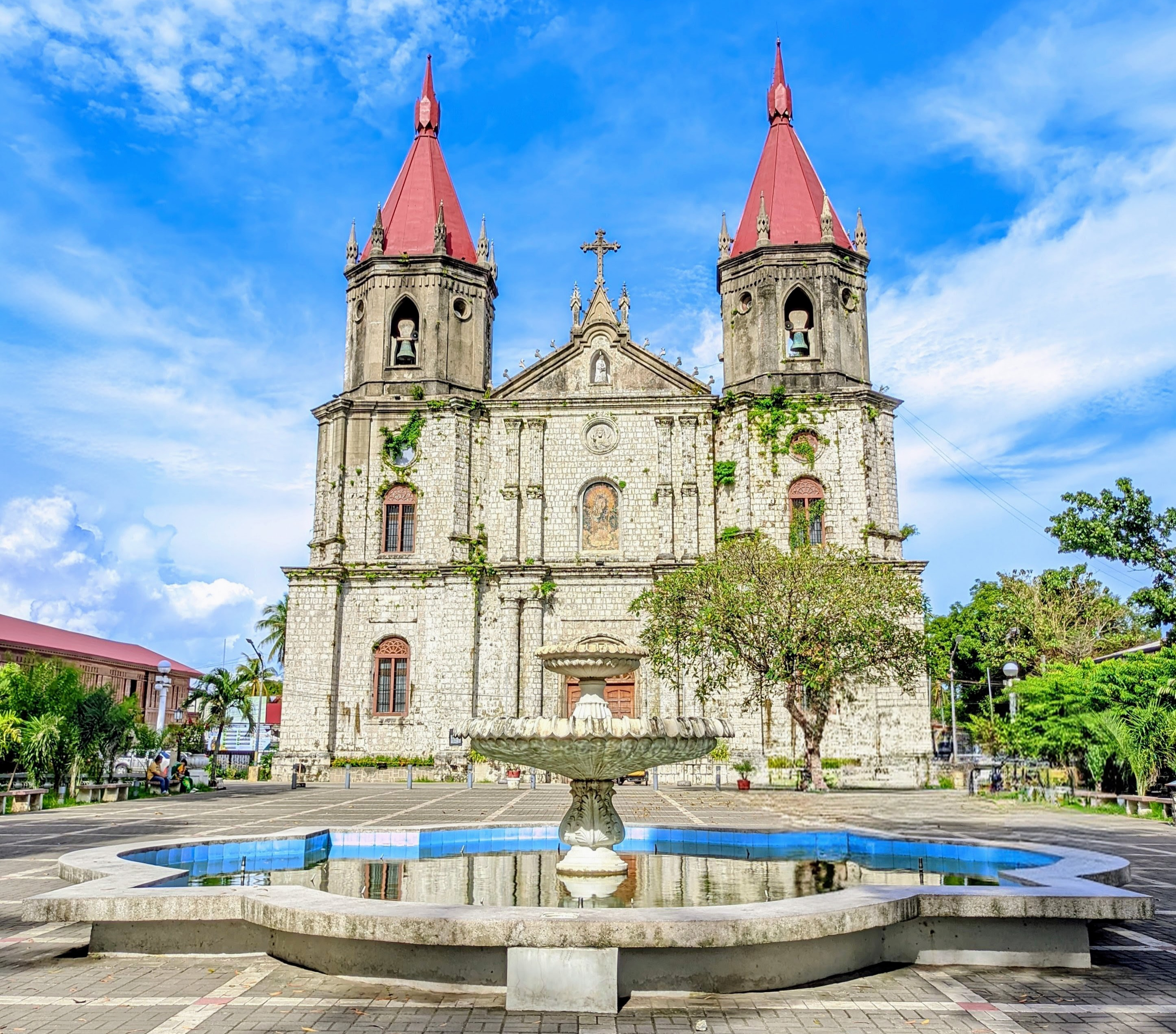
- The church in October 2025

- Location in the Visayas Location in the Philippines
- 10°41′50″N 122°32′41″E
- Location: Molo, Iloilo City, Iloilo
- Country: Philippines
- Language(s): Hiligaynon, English
- Denomination: Roman Catholic

History
- Status: Parish church
- Founded: 1831; 195 years ago
- Dedication: Saint Anne
- Consecrated: 1888; 138 years ago

Architecture
- Functional status: Active
- Heritage designation: National Historical Landmark
- Designated: 1992
- Architectural type: Church building
- Style: Gothic-Renaissance
- Groundbreaking: 1831; 195 years ago
- Completed: 1888; 138 years ago

Specifications
- Length: 82.1 m (269 ft)
- Width: 28.7 m (94 ft)
- Materials: Coral, Limestone

Administration
- Archdiocese: Jaro
- Deanery: Saint Paul
- Parish: Saint Anne

Clergy
- Priest(s): Very Rev. Msgr. Jose Marie Amado S. Delgado., P.C.

National Historical Landmarks
- Region: Western Visayas
- Legal Basis: Resolution No. 4, s. 1993
- Marker Date: 1992

Santa Ana Parish Church, commonly known as Molo Church (Filipino: Simbahan ng Molo; Hiligaynon: Simbahan sang Molo), is a Spanish neo-Gothic Roman Catholic church located in the district of Molo in Iloilo City, in the Philippines. It is under the jurisdiction of the Archdiocese of Jaro. The church is recognized as "the women's church" or "the feminist church" because it only features images of female saints inside, including Saint Anne, the patron saint of Molo. The National Historical Institute declared it a national landmark in 1992.

== History ==
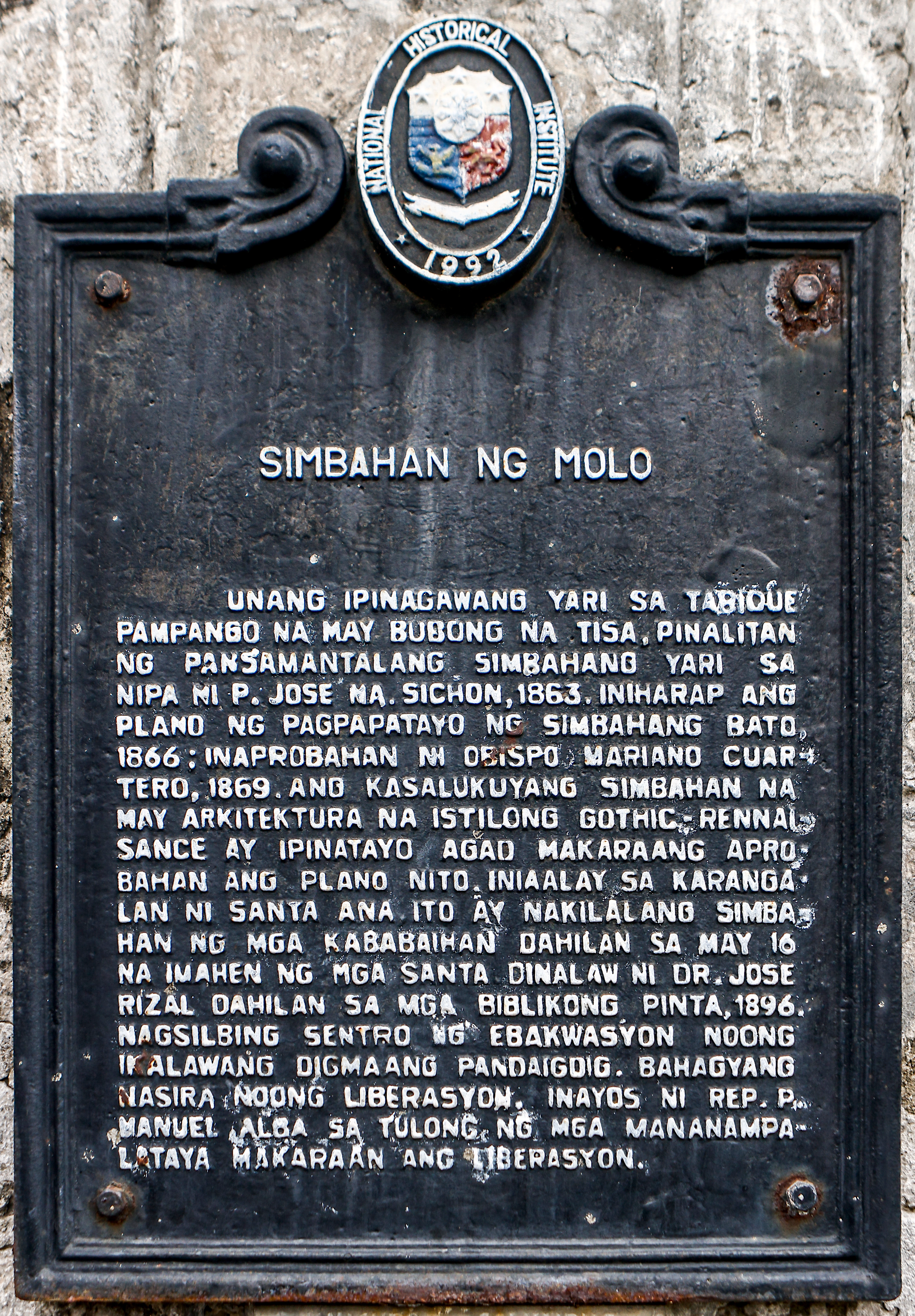
Church NHI historical marker installed in 1992

Molo Church was constructed in 1831 under Fray Pablo Montaño. Originally made of tabique pampango with a chalk roof. Plans for a concrete structure were drawn up in 1866, approved by Bishop Mariano Cuartero in 1869, and completed in 1888 by Fray Agapito Buenaflor under Don Jose Manuel Locsin's supervision. In honor of Saint Anne, the church is known as a feminist church because of its two rows of sixteen female saints on both sides of the altar.

Molo Church was visited by Dr. Jose Rizal on August 4, 1886, because of its biblical paintings, which can no longer be seen in the church.

It served as an evacuation center for civilians during World War II. The church was damaged and one tower was destroyed on March 18, 1945, during the liberation of the Philippines from Japan. The church was later repaired by Rev. Manuel Alba with the help of the congregation.

The church was declared a national landmark by the National Historical Institute in 1992 through the representation of Sir Knight Rex S. Salvilla. It is the only Gothic church in the country outside of Metro Manila.

== Architecture ==
The façade of the church is made of rough stone that highlights the Gothic-Renaissance Revival elements seen in the structure, with its two towers that have numerous spires and pointed arches. The church has three naves with sixteen statues of female saints inside. These saints are St. Juliana of Nicomedia, St. Marcella, St. Lucy, St. Apollonia, St. Genevieve, St. Rose of Lima, St. Elizabeth of Hungary, St. Teresa of Ávila, St. Clare of Assisi, St. Monica, St. Cecilia, St. Felicity of Rome, St. Agnes of Rome, St. Margaret of Antioch, St. Martha of Bethany and St. Mary Magdalene.

The church has four wooden side altars and a single high altar. It also features two decorated wooden pulpits. The church's patroness, Saint Anne, is housed in the reredos at the high altar, along with statues of the Blessed Virgin and the Holy Trinity.

== Gallery ==
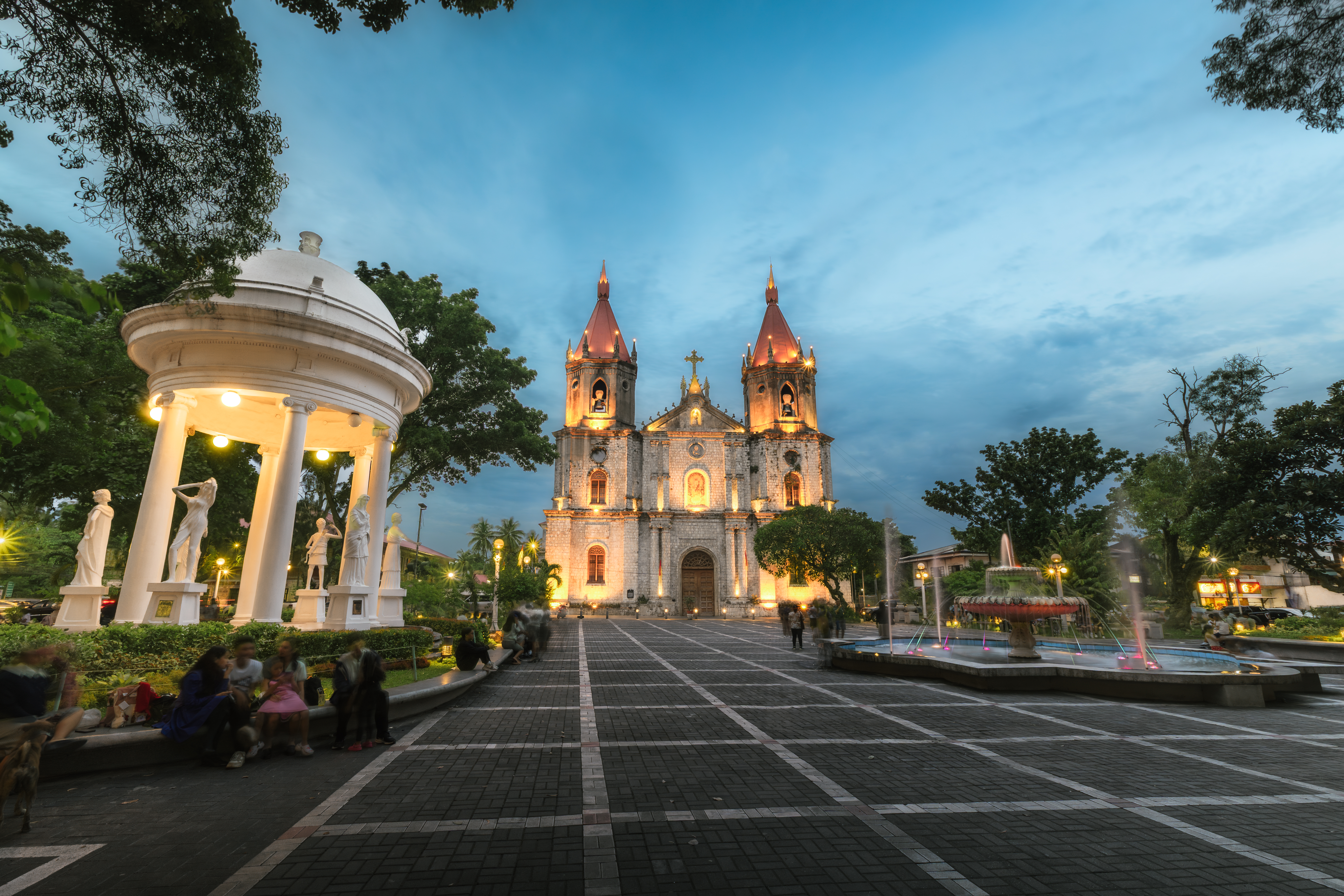
View of the church from the Molo Plaza at blue hour

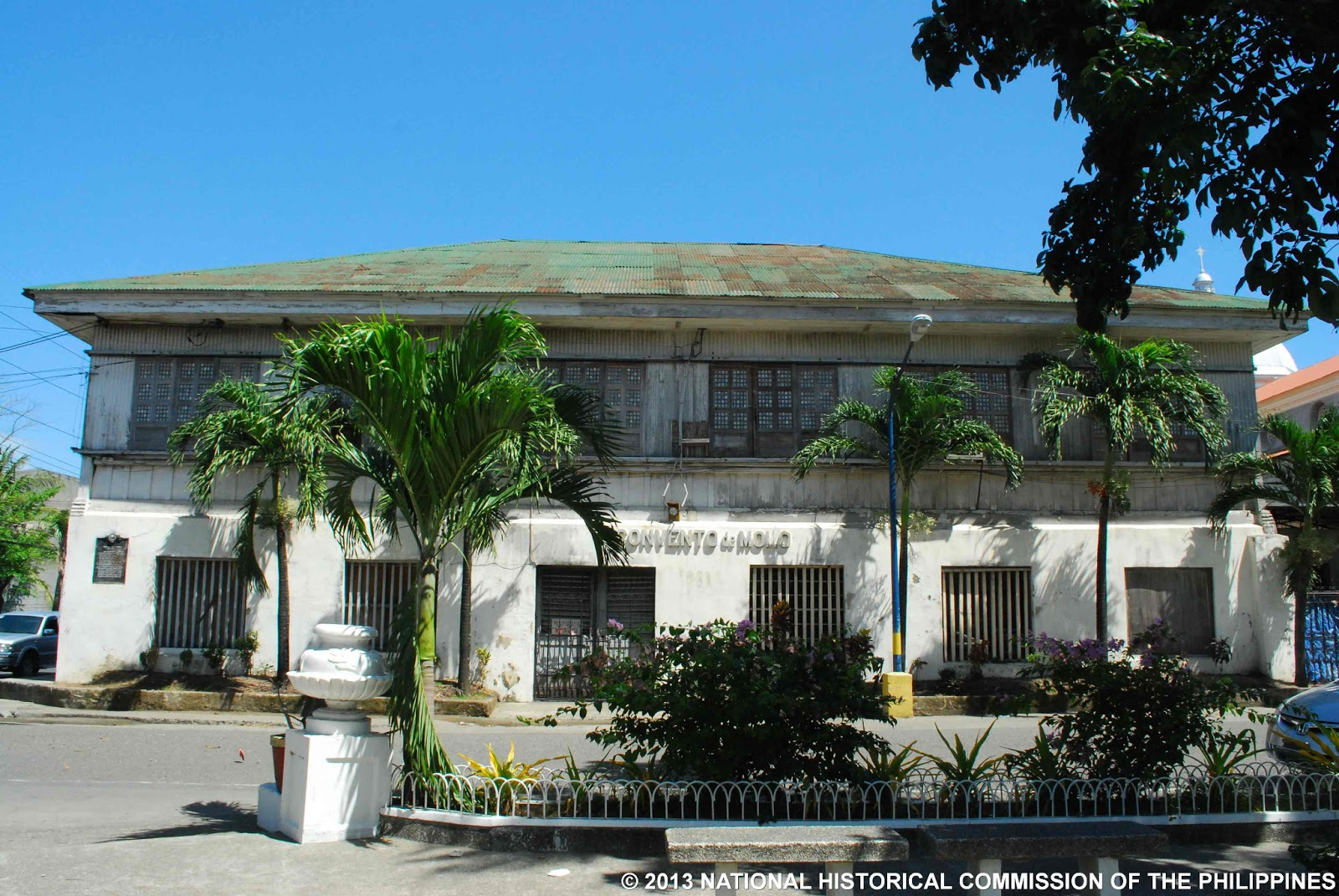
Convent of Molo beside the church

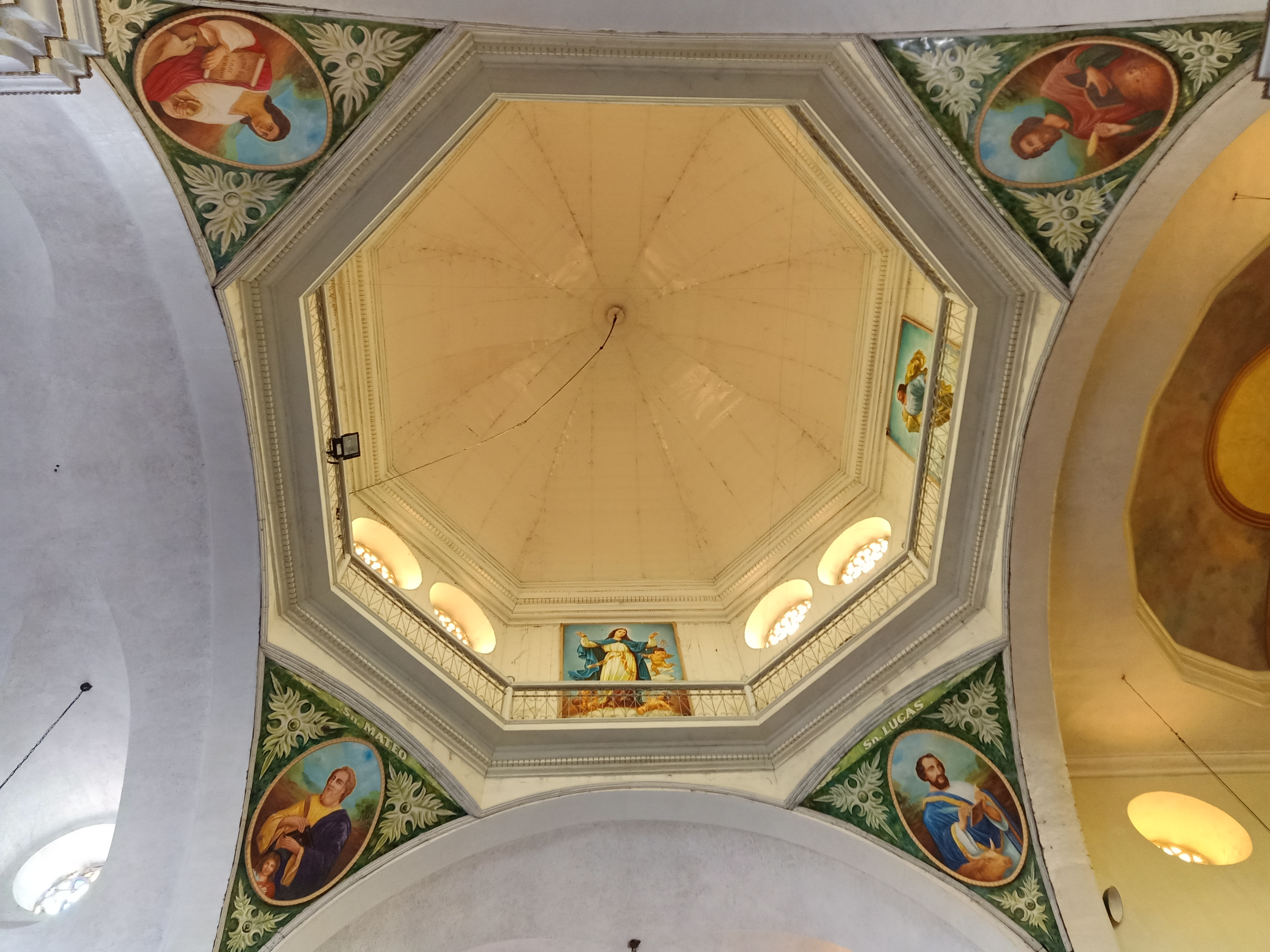
Dome interior

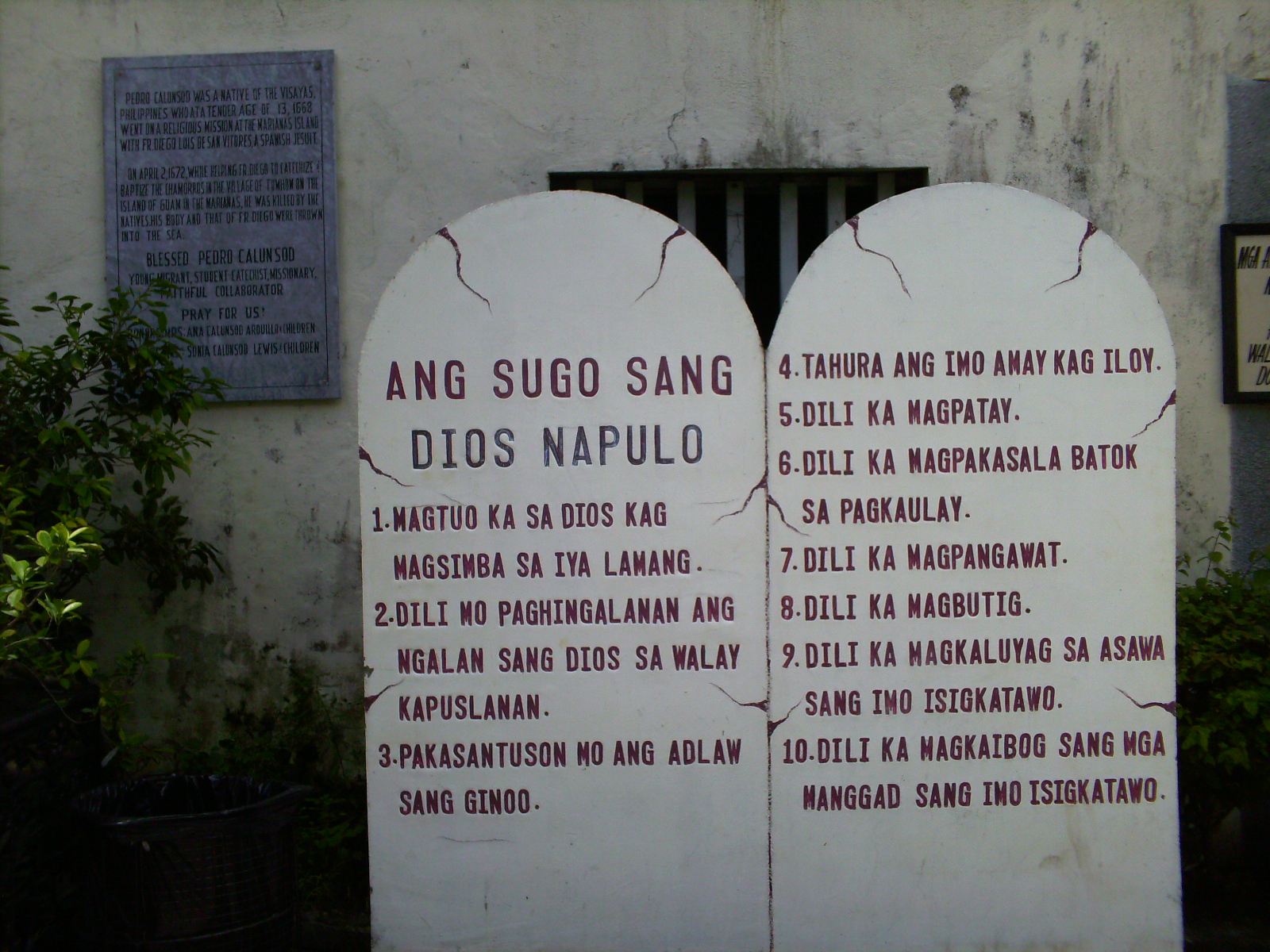
The Ten Commandments in Hiligaynon language

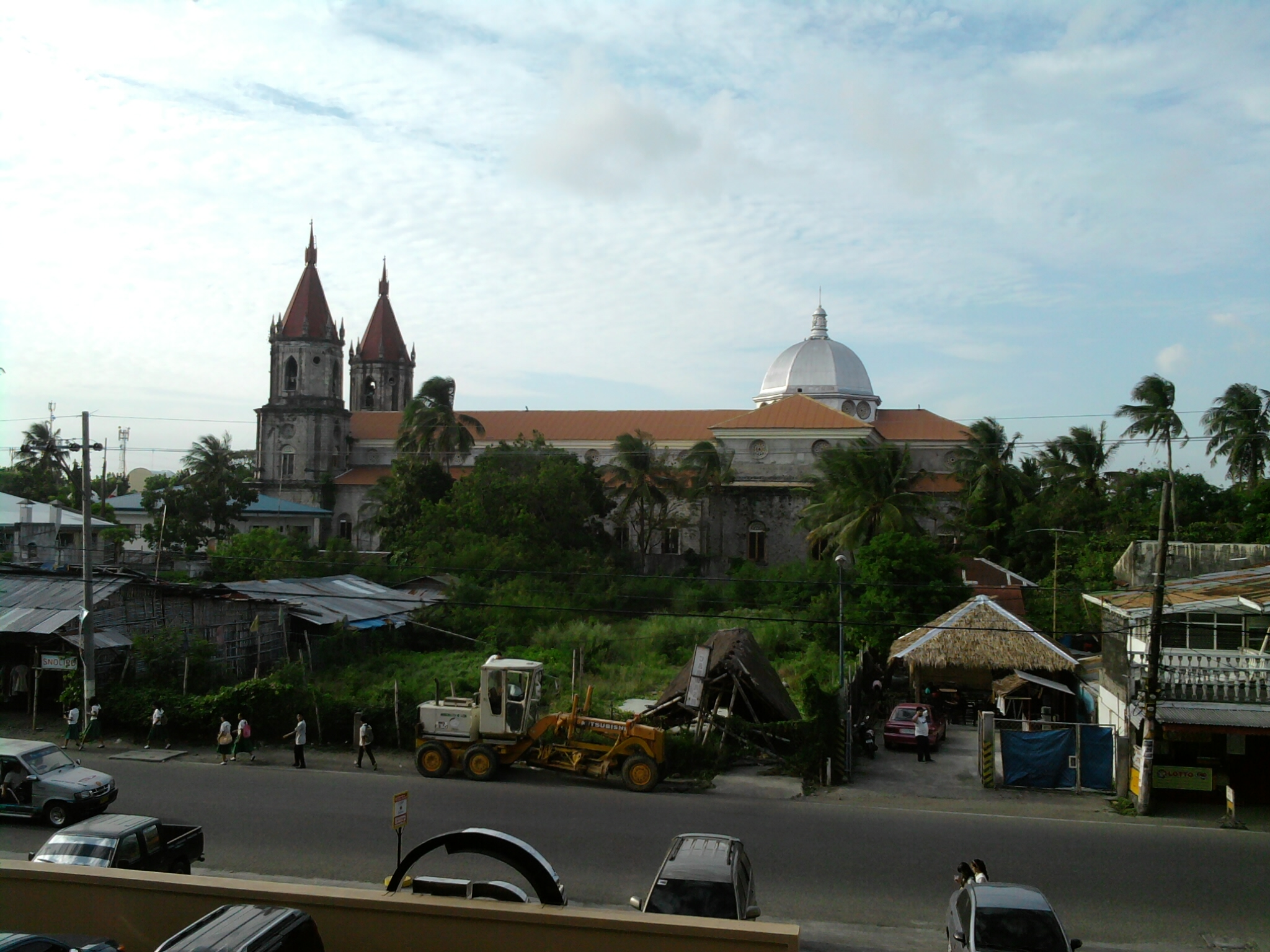
Side view of the church

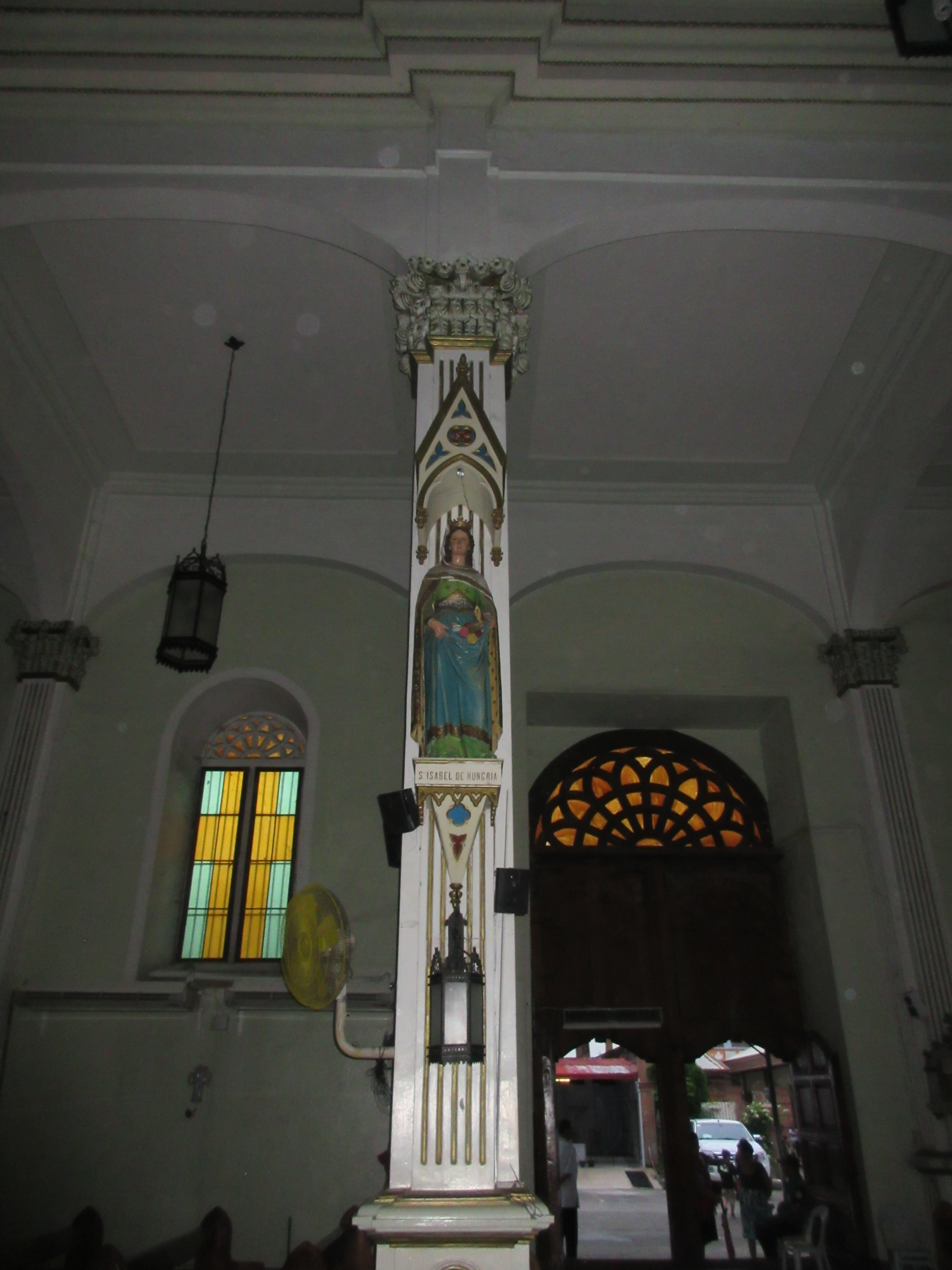
A sculpture of St. Elizabeth of Hungary, one of the sixteen female saints inside the church

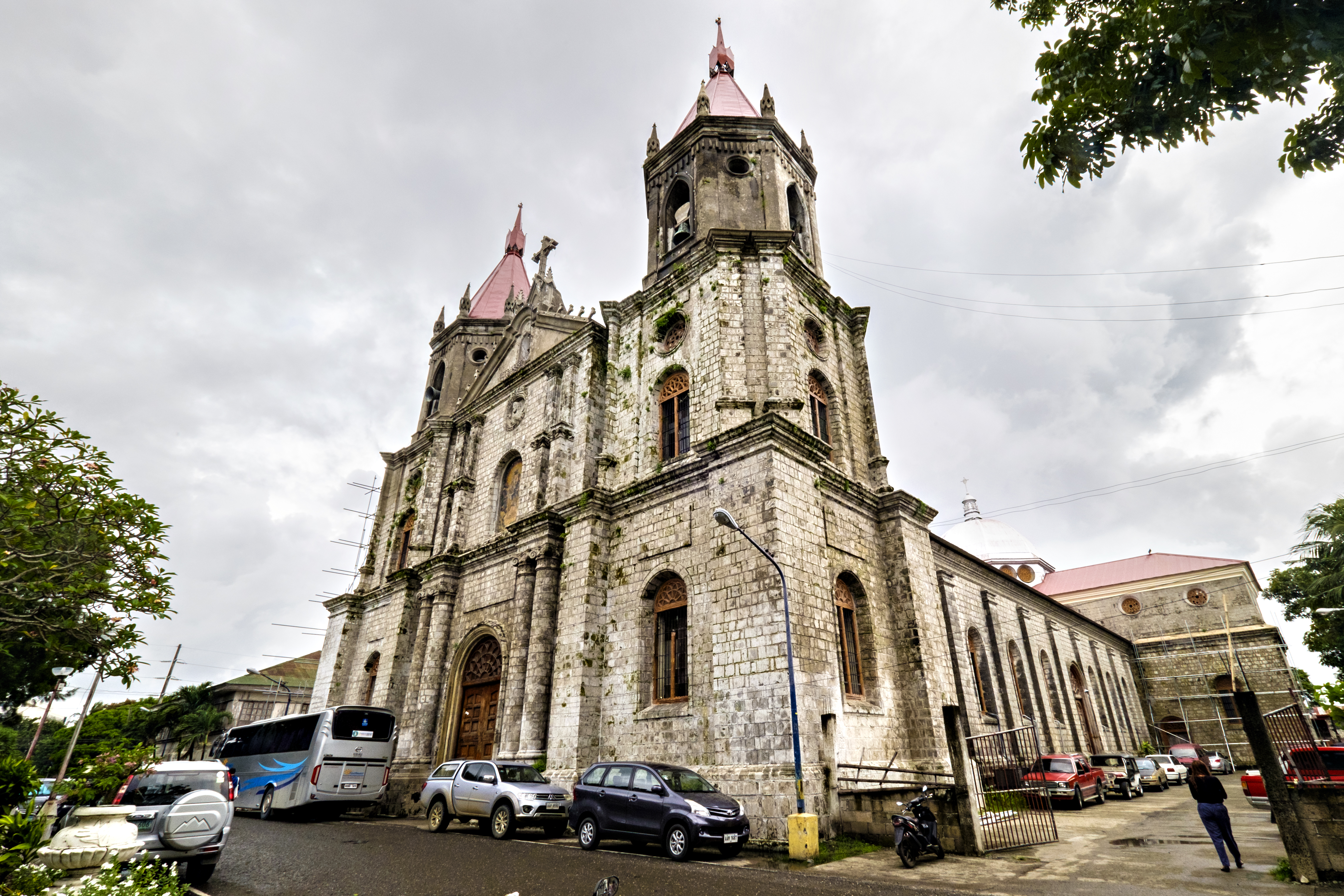
Northwest façade

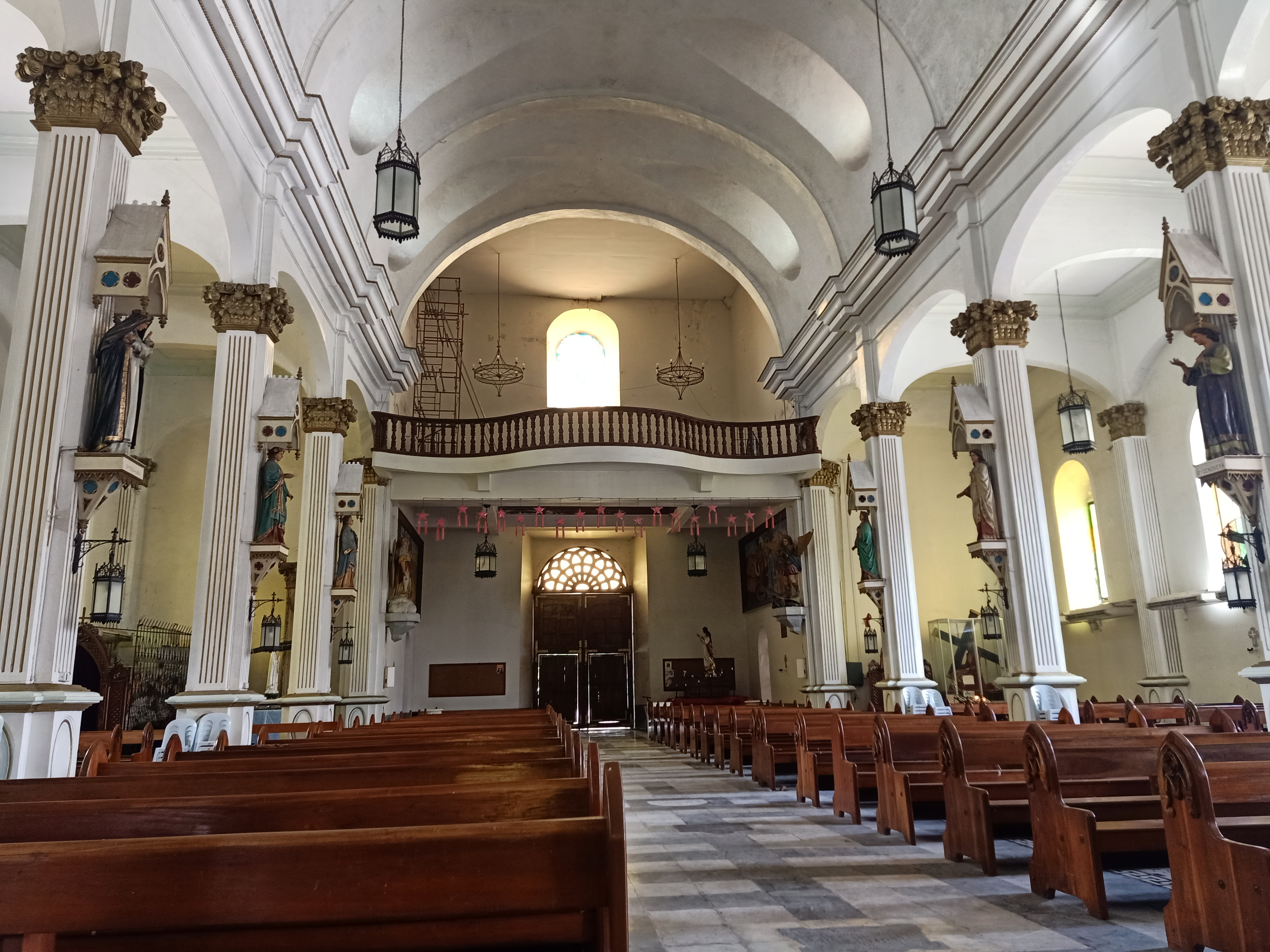
Interior facing northwest

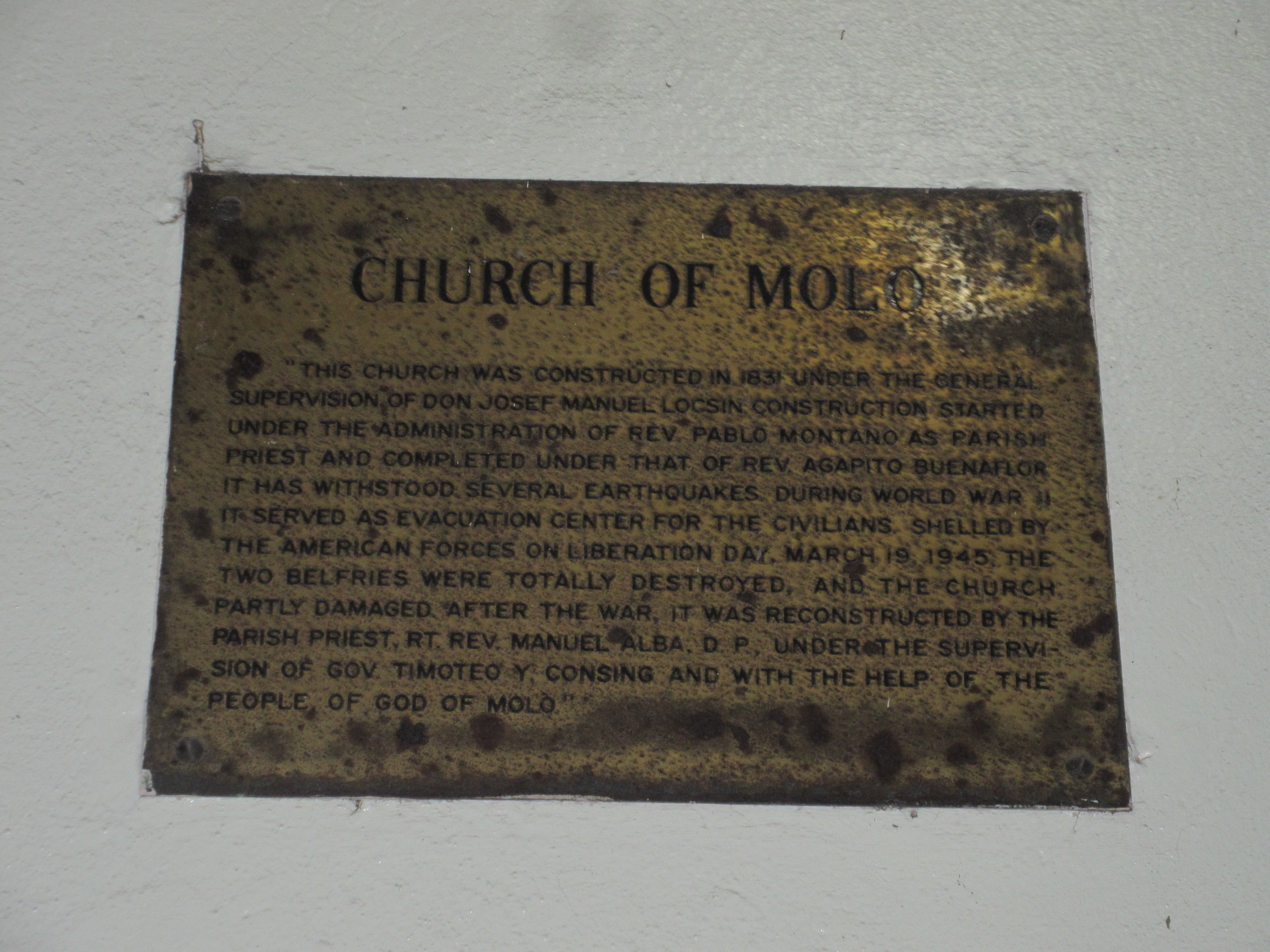
Another historical marker

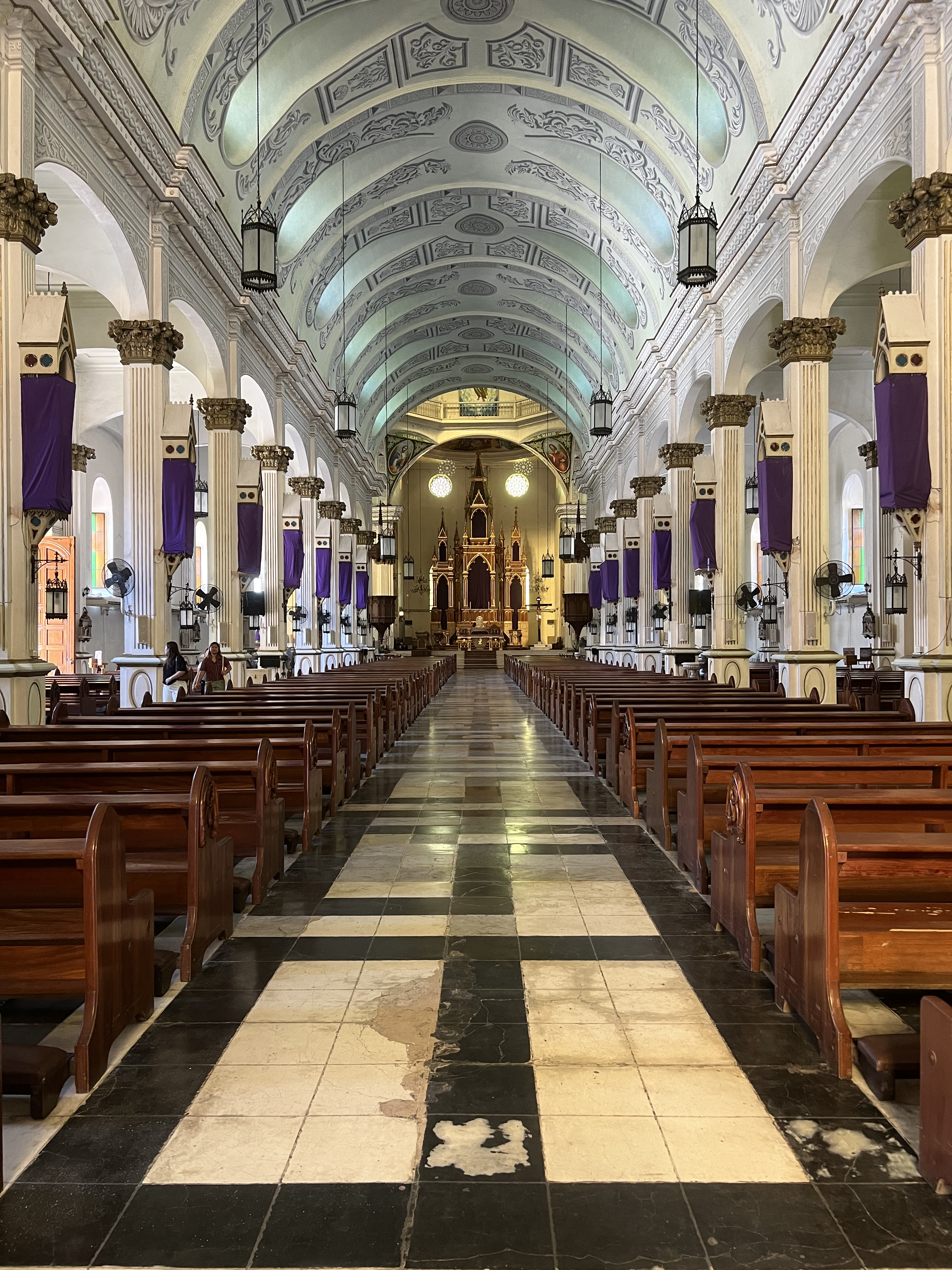
Nave

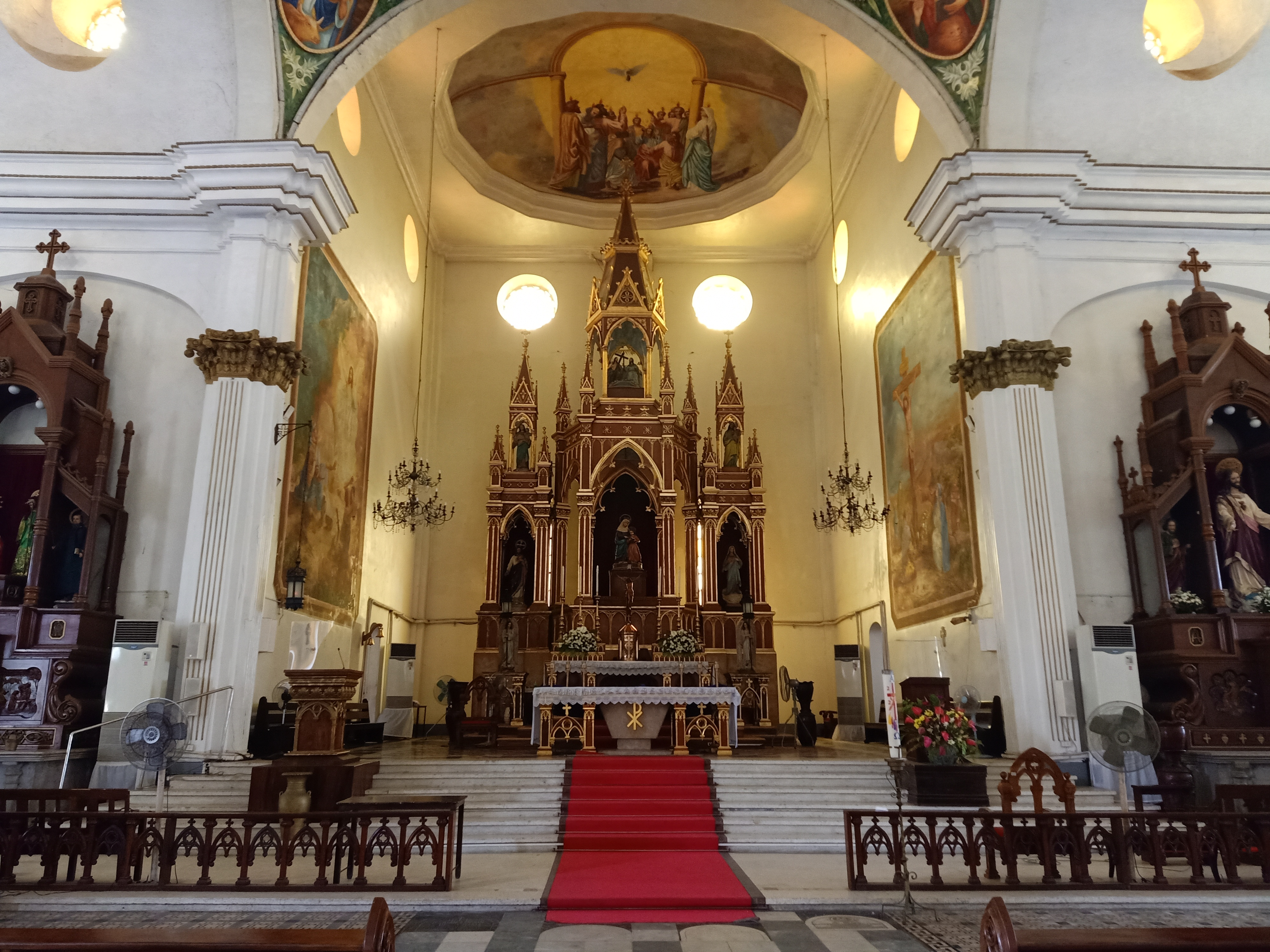
High altar and reredos

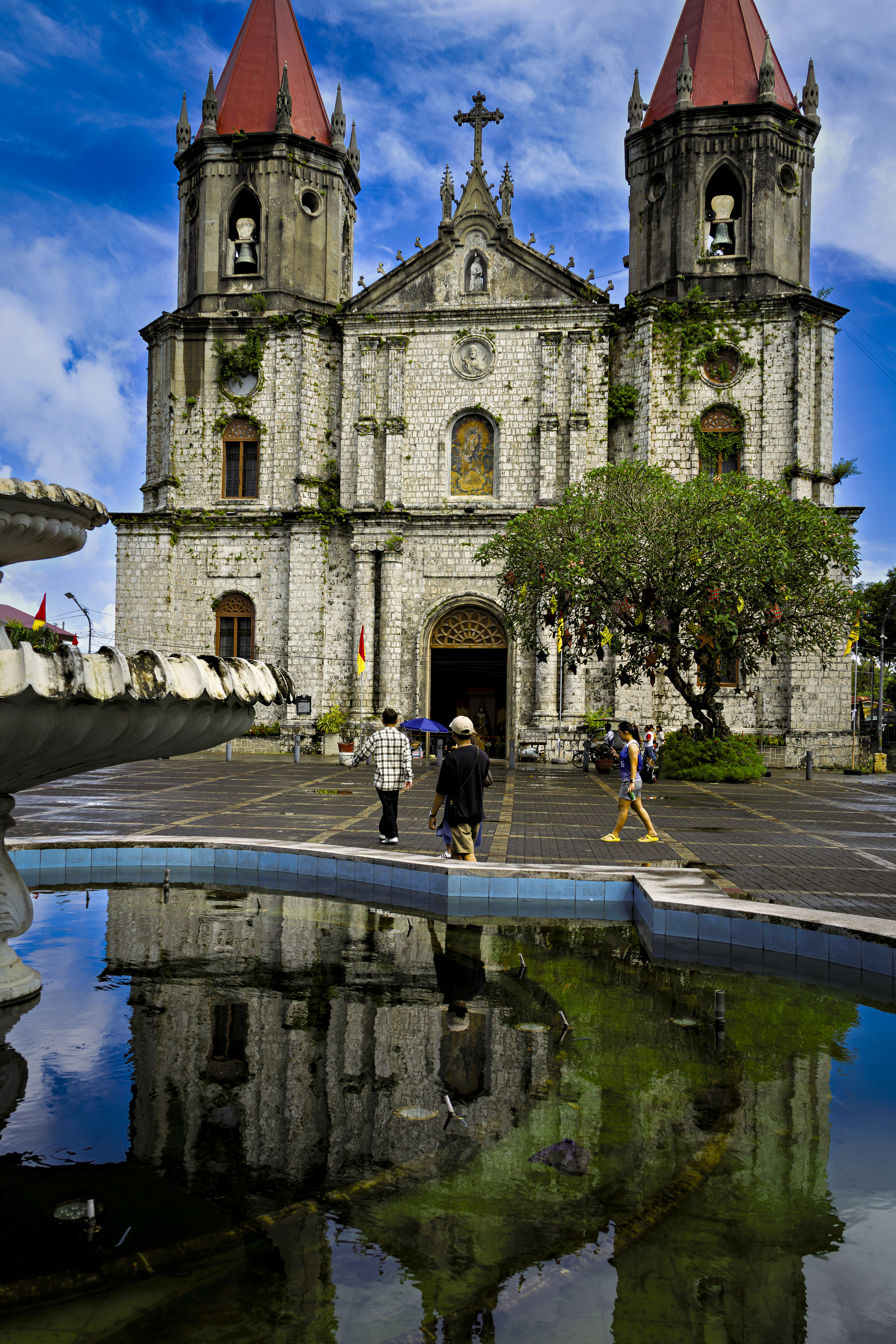

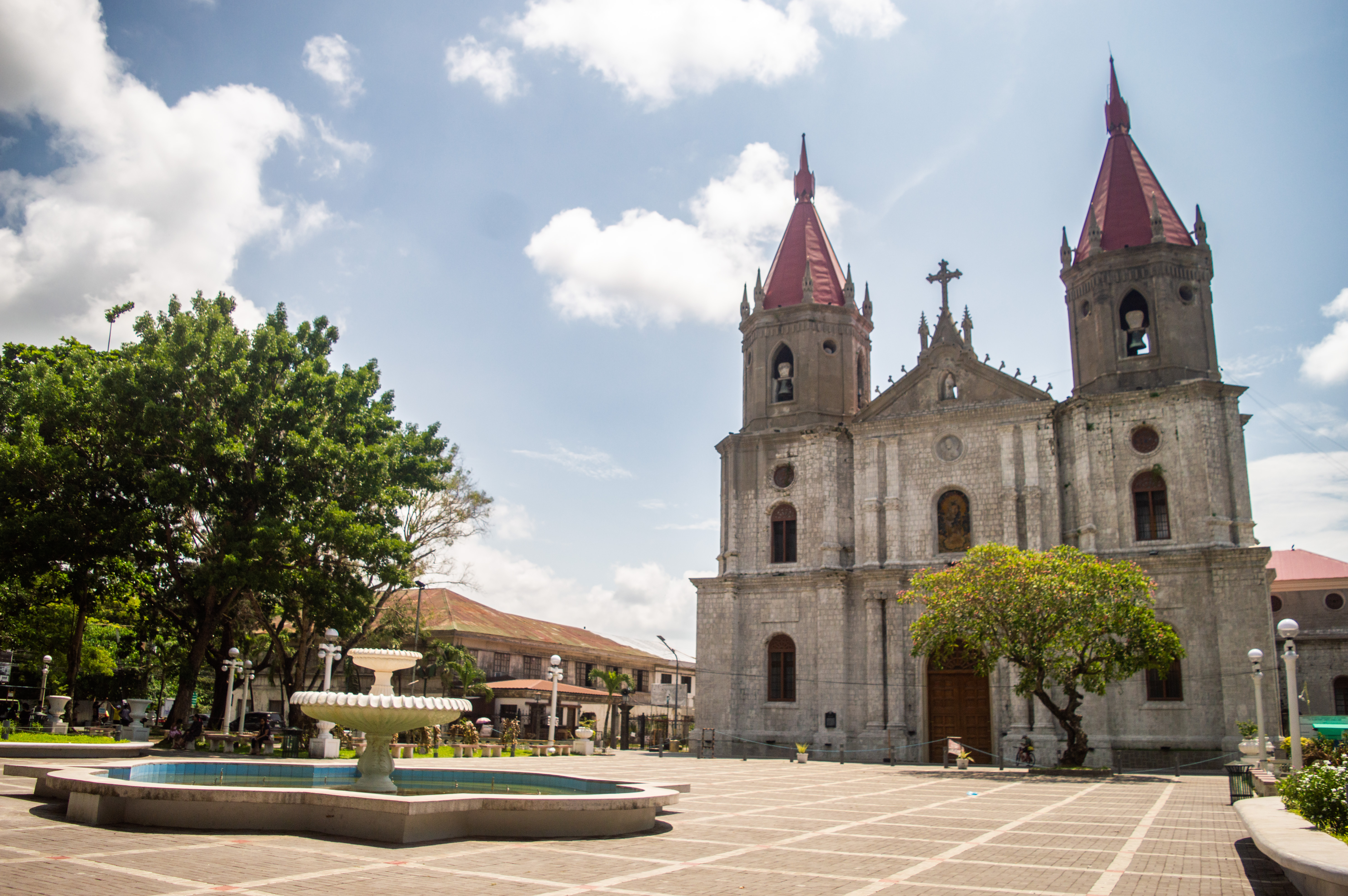

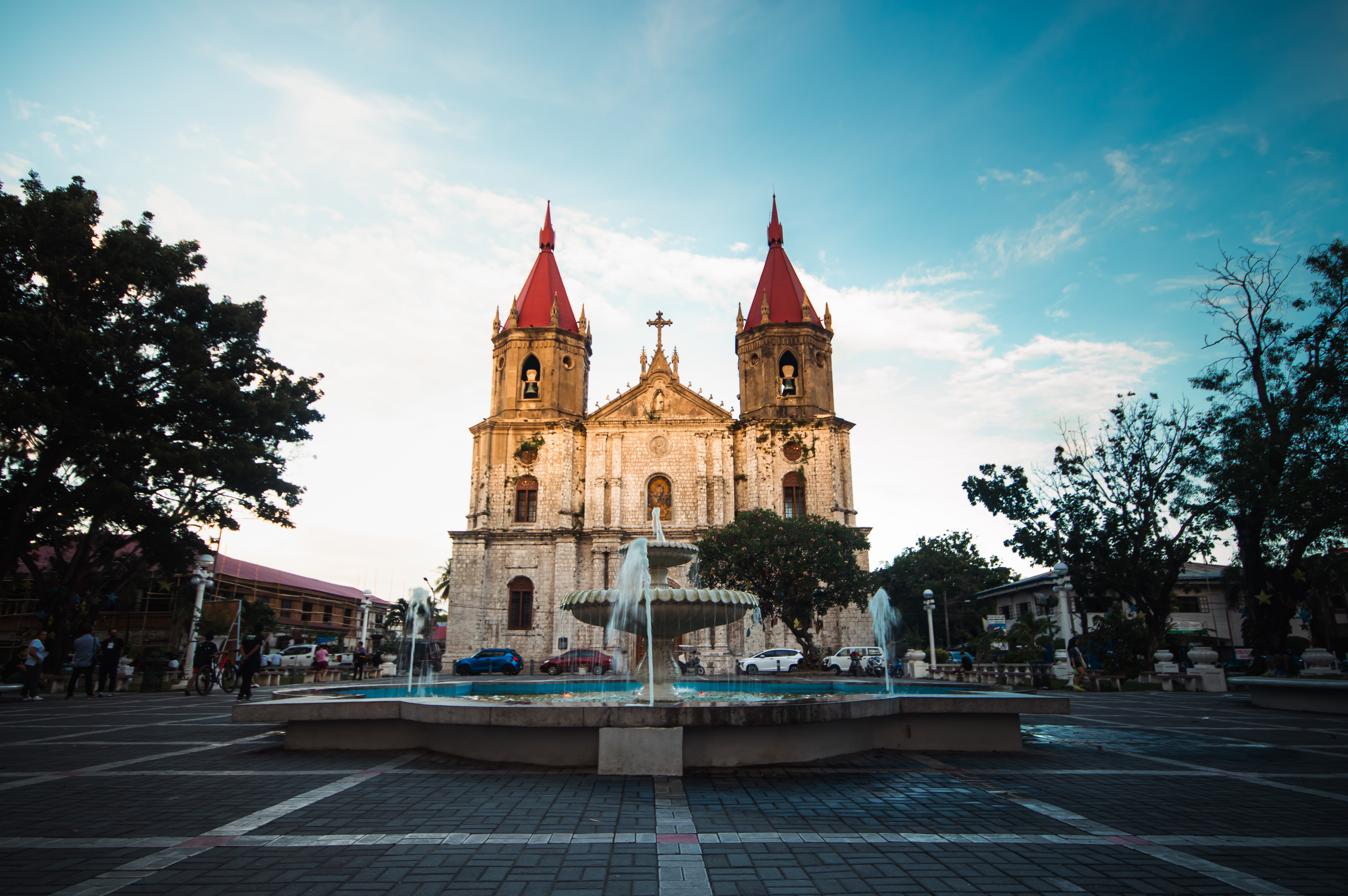

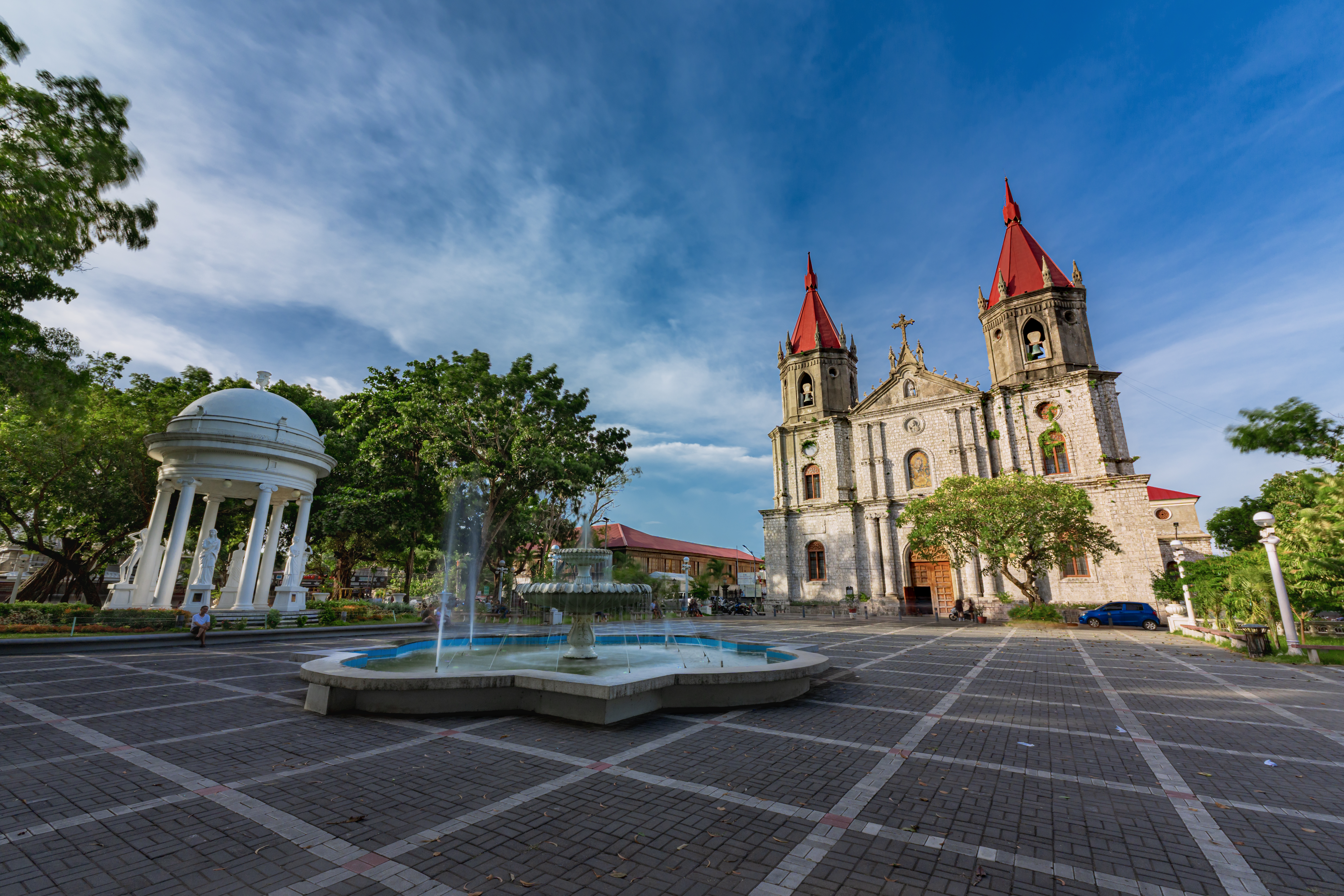

== See also ==
- Jaro Cathedral
