= Saint Anthony of Padua Church (Barotac Nuevo, Iloilo) =

Roman Catholic church in Iloilo, Philippines

Barotac Nuevo Church
- Saint Anthony of Padua Parish Church
- Parokya ni San Antonio de Padua (Filipino)
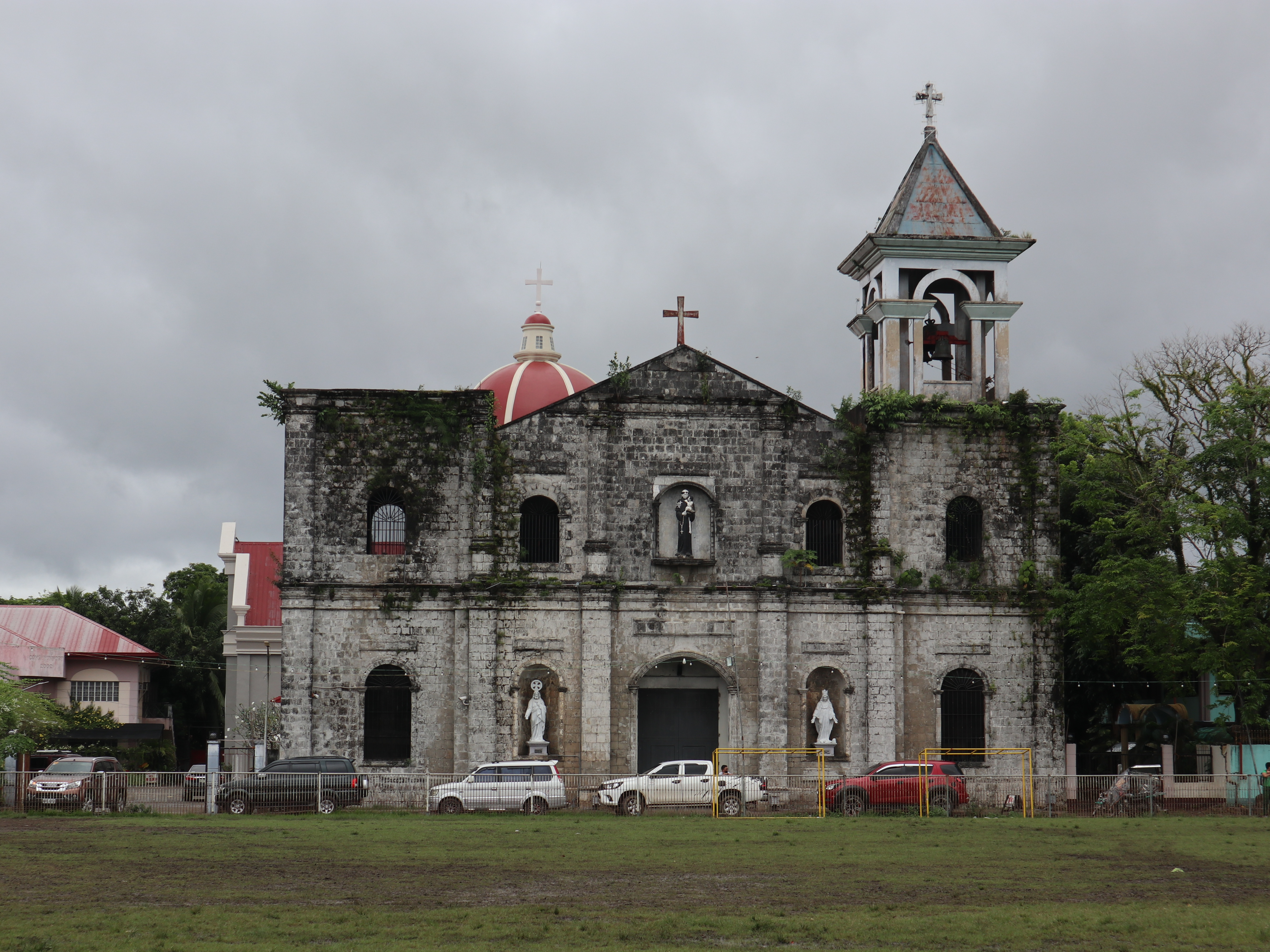
- Church facade in January 2023

- Location in the Visayas Location in the Philippines
- 10°53′43″N 122°42′15″E
- Location: Barotac Nuevo, Iloilo
- Country: Philippines
- Denomination: Roman Catholic

History
- Status: Parish church
- Founded: 1710
- Founder: Friar Luis Gomez de Padilla
- Dedication: St. Anthony of Padua

Architecture
- Functional status: Active
- Heritage designation: National Historic Landmark
- Designated: 1997
- Architectural type: Church building
- Style: Neo-Romanesque
- Completed: 1910
- Closed: 1944-1947

Specifications
- Materials: Coral stone and bricks

Administration
- Archdiocese: Jaro
- Deanery: St. Jude Thaddeus
- Parish: St. Anthony of Padua

Clergy
- Priest: Father Francisco Gabriel

Saint Anthony of Padua Parish Church, commonly known as Barotac Nuevo Church, is a Roman Catholic church in the municipality of Barotac Nuevo, Iloilo, Philippines under the Archdiocese of Jaro. It was declared as a National Historic Landmark in 1998 under the leadership of Monsignor Jesus Enojo assisted by Congressman Narciso Montfort. The present church was completed in 1910 under the guidance of Father Mariano Conjugacion and played a significant role during the Spanish and Japanese occupations.

== History ==
Barotac Nuevo, which was then called Ginhawa-an, was civilized when the Spanish discovered and occupied it during the late 16th century. The Spanish conquistadors built a bamboo and nipa chapel to initiate the evangelization of the locals in 1573. Trade within adjacent neighbors started after these developments and the economy started to flourish. When the soldiers fled from Ginhawa-an, the church was burned by the locals and they also killed the resident friar. This resulted the Spanish government to send an army to pacify them by burning their settlements and killing some of the natives including their leader Sugaob for revenge.

Military reinforcements arrived in 1581 and with them was the parish priest of Dumangas, Father Juan de Peñanosa which aimed to forcefully Christianize the natives, even to the point of murdering the people to participate within the program. A pathway connecting Dumangas and Ginhawa-an, which was built between 1589 and 1595 under Father Bartolome de Castillo was one of the developments of Ginhawa-an that made it a sitio of the recently proclaimed pueblo (or town) of Dumangas.

The settlement changed its name to Barotac, during the time when volcanic residues covered almost the entire area and destroyed the agriculture. The name Barotac is from the Spanish word baro, which means mud, as well as the last syllables of tac and lutac. Nuevo was added to distinguish its name from the other Barotac within the island.

Barotac was officially declared as parish in 1710 under the soon-to-be parish priest, Father Luis Gomez de Padilla.

The 40-year reconstruction was finished in 1750 in the Romanesque style but it was short-lived because of the destruction brought about by the 1758 earthquake. A new church of coral stone and bricks and a convent were immediately constructed following the devastation and were both completed in 1802. In 1907, another fire destroyed the church which was led to believe that it was caused by an arson.

In 1910, a new church under the leadership of Father Mariano Conjugacion was built and it will survive until the present day. During the World War II, Colonel Macario Peralta Jr. ordered that the whole church and convent be burnt in order to render it useless as a Japanese garrison. The fire destroyed only the convent which was then later occupied by the Japanese soldiers to be used as their stronghold for the remainder of the war; this lasted from 1942 to 1944. On June 13, 1944, during the first ever fiesta of the barrio, Juan Maquiling, a spy from the Filipino troops penetrated and annihilated all of the Japanese soldiers inside the church. Eventually the war ended, and the church was re-used not until 1947.

A modern steel bell tower was added in 1966.

=== Post-War reconstructions and additions ===
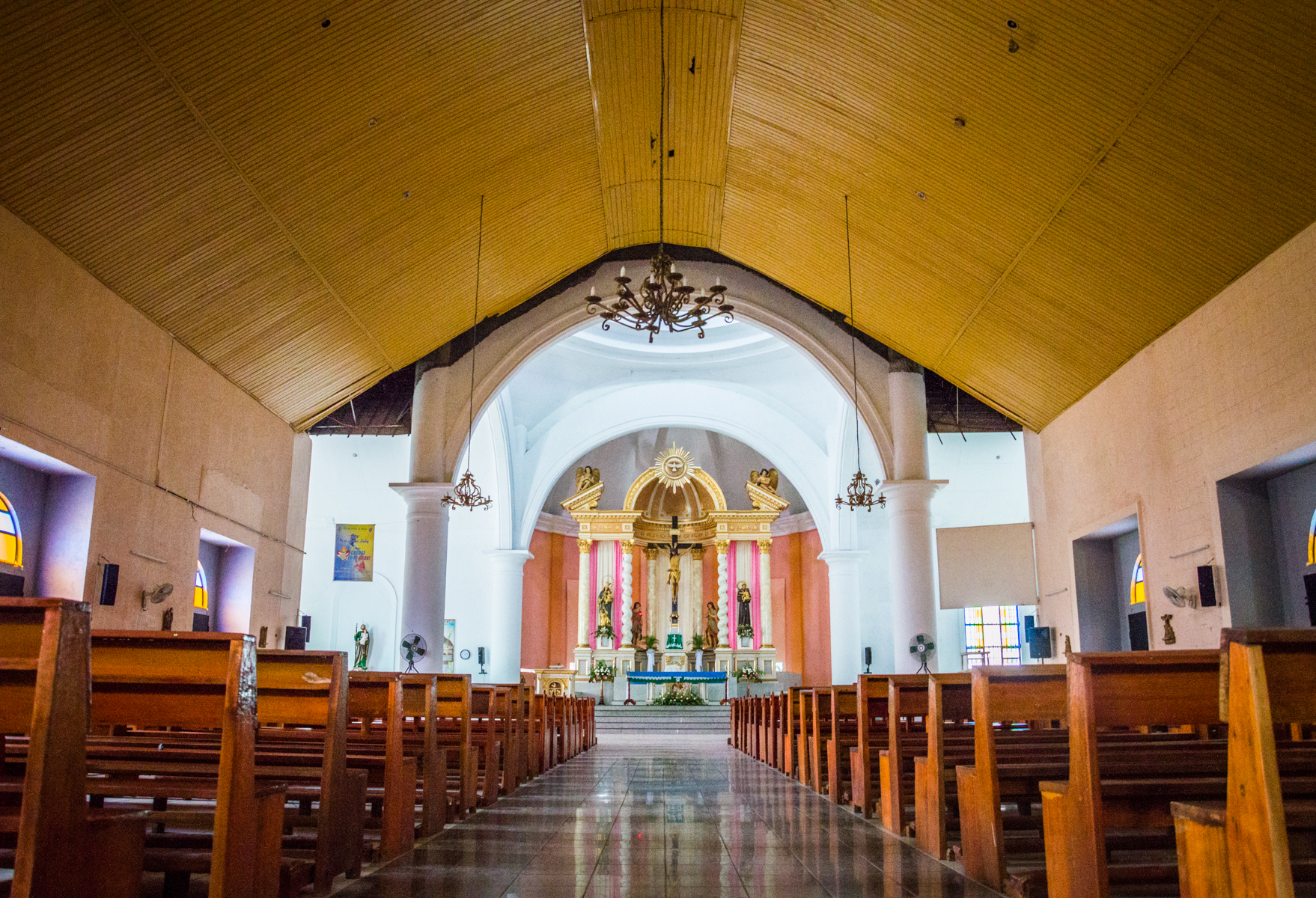
Church interior in 2014

The Barotac Nuevo Church was declared a National Historic Landmark through Msgr. Jesus Enojo and Congressman Narciso Montfort. Through this declaration, the church received funds for a major reconstruction. The plan included the removal of the columns in the main aisle of the church; installation of side posts to reinforce the supports of the main roof trusses; and installation of a new ceiling throughout and granite floor tiles. In 2002, a Church Building Commission under Monsignor Ramon Pet was organized and was tasked to construct the following: a new altar and a dome, new convent, adoration chapel, new parish hall, quarters for the altar boys, boutique and main parking area, cemetery chapel and memorial park.

== The plaza ==
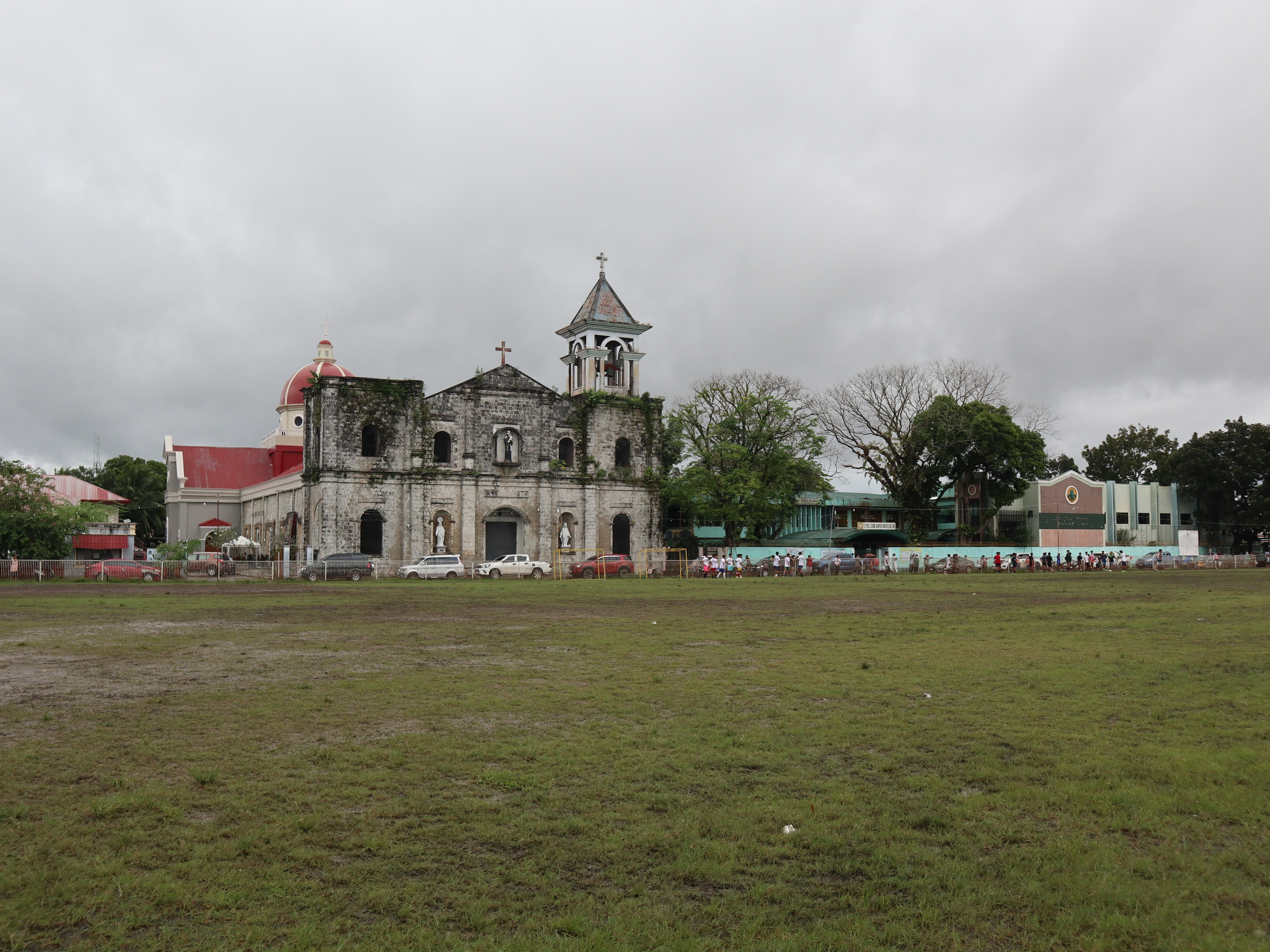
The plaza fronting the church

The heritage church is beside a football field that is currently used as playground and practice grounds for children, adults and professionals. The town of Barotac Nuevo officially holds the title, "the Football Capital of the Philippines". It used to be a Spanish plaza which is common in building Spanish church typology.
