= History of Iloilo City =

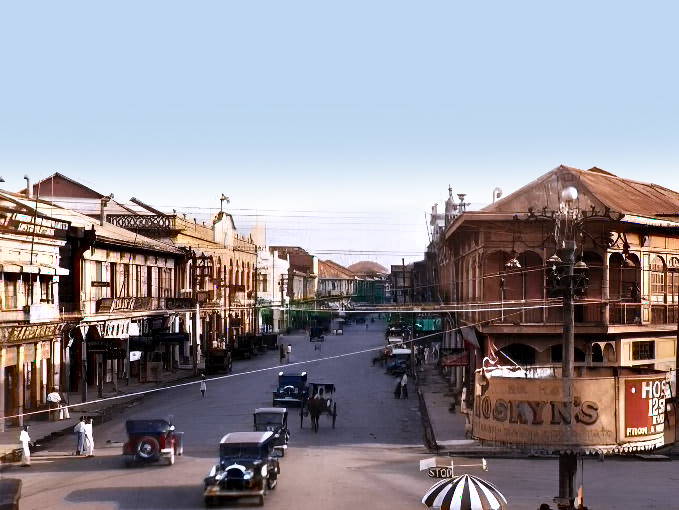
Calle Real, Iloilo City, circa early 1900s

Iloilo City, the regional center of Western Visayas, is one of the oldest cities in the Philippines and a major economic hub in the Visayas region. The history of Iloilo City traces its beginnings to the 14th century, when records from the Yuan dynasty mention a bustling trade outpost in the area. During the Spanish colonial period, the town developed into a prosperous port and an important administrative center. Iloilo was formally granted city status by Queen Regent Maria Christina through a royal decree in 1889, which also bestowed upon it the honorific title La Muy Leal y Noble Ciudad ("The Most Loyal and Noble City"). By the late 19th century, Iloilo had become the second most important city in the Philippines, next to Manila.

Following the fall of Manila to American forces in 1898, Iloilo briefly served as the seat of the Spanish colonial government in the Philippines, making it the last capital of the Spanish East Indies. Under American rule, the city continued to flourish as a center of commerce, education, and culture in the region. During World War II, Iloilo was occupied by Japanese forces from 1942 until its liberation in 1945. In the immediate postwar period, the city experienced a modest economic slowdown as it rebuilt from wartime destruction.

In the early 21st century, Iloilo City experienced significant economic growth, becoming one of the fastest-growing cities in the Philippines. Today, it is known for its well-preserved heritage structures, vibrant economy, culinary traditions, and cultural events such as the Dinagyang Festival, one of the largest and most popular festivals in the Philippines. In 2023, Iloilo City was designated as a UNESCO Creative City of Gastronomy.

== Legends and oral traditions ==
According to oral tradition, ten datus left the island of Borneo to escape a tyrant ruler, Datu Makatunao. They arrived in Panay through the Siwaragan River in San Joaquin, Iloilo, where the native Ati people lived under their chieftain, Marikudo, and his wife, Maniwan-tiwan.

Datu Puti, one of the datus, expressed their desire to settle in the lowlands. They offered to barter the lowlands for a golden salakot, a long-brimmed hat, and a long golden necklace. Marikudo agreed to the barter and moved with his people to the mountains. After the transaction, the datus divided the lowlands among themselves. Datu Paiburong was known to have settled in a village called Irong-irong, the old name for Iloilo.

Although the story of the ten datus and the so-called "Barter of Panay" has been widely retold in Visayan culture, modern historians and anthropologists generally regard it as a legend rather than a factual account. Scholars note that no contemporary evidence supports the existence of the ten datus or the barter event, and many elements of the story appear to be symbolic explanations for early settlement patterns rather than literal historical events. Because of this, the narrative is now considered part of the region's rich folklore, reflecting cultural memory rather than verifiable history.

== Pre-colonial period ==
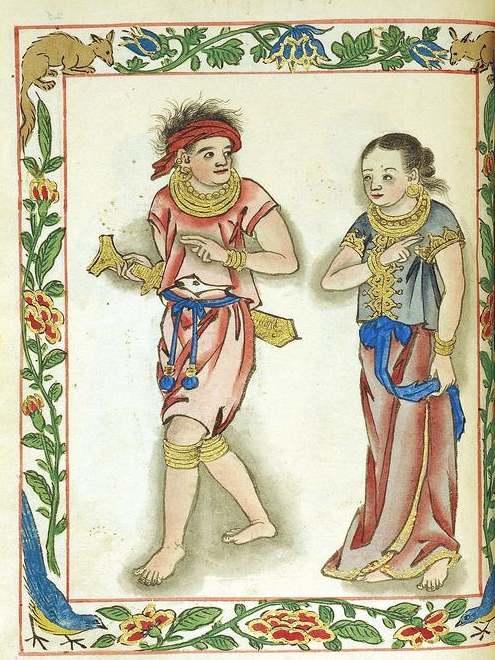
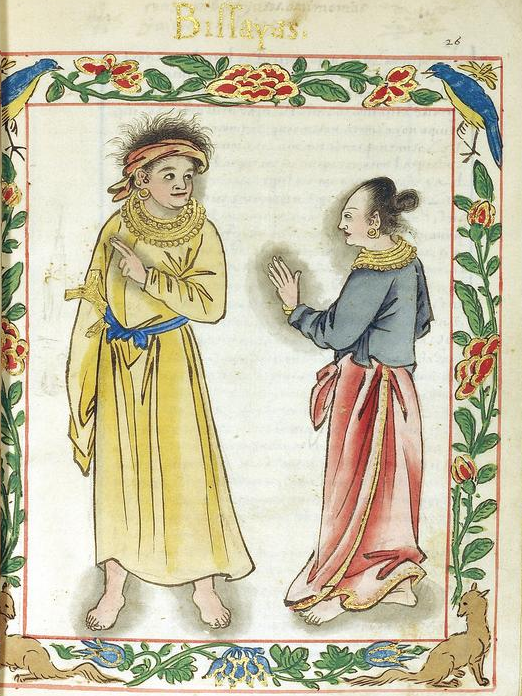
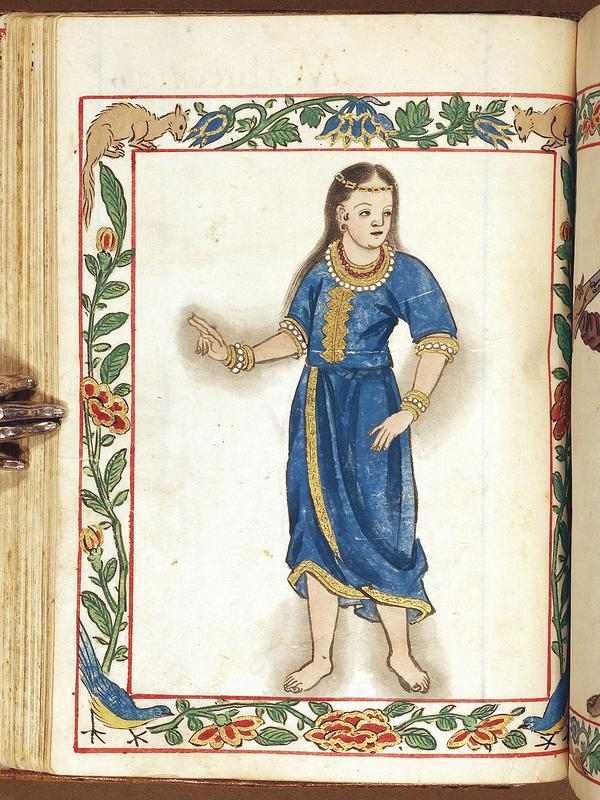
Images from the Boxer Codex (c. 1595), illustrating ancient Visayans

Before the arrival of the Spaniards, Panay Island was inhabited by two major ethnic groups: the Negritos or Atis and the Visayans. These groups formed the earliest communities that shaped the cultural landscape of the region. The earliest written reference to Iloilo appears in Yuan dynasty records from the 14th century, identifying the area around modern-day Iloilo as 啞陳 (Pe̍h-ōe-jī: A-tân), a bustling trade outpost in the Visayas.

The Atis, considered the earliest settlers, lived primarily in the mountainous and forested areas of Panay. They were nomadic hunter-gatherers who moved from place to place in search of food. Their clothing was minimal, often just pieces of bark or woven fibers used to cover themselves, and their lifestyle was closely tied to the natural environment. Their small, mobile communities relied on hunting, foraging, and simple tools.

In contrast, the Visayans lived along the coasts and river systems, forming larger, more settled communities, including those along the waterways of present-day Iloilo City. Early Spanish accounts, such as the Boxer Codex, Antonio de Morga's Sucesos de las Islas Filipinas, and the writings of Miguel de Loarca, describe Visayans as heavily tattooed people, leading to the Spanish nickname Pintados. The tattoos symbolized status, achievements in battle, and social identity.

Visayans wore clothing made of cotton with colored stripes, as well as silk and textiles woven from banana fibers. Gold ornaments were common, especially among the upper classes, who adorned themselves with earrings, bracelets, and intricately worked jewelry that signified wealth and prestige.

Early scholars such as H. Otley Beyer initially used the term "Visayan" to refer specifically to the inhabitants of Panay. Over time, however, the term expanded to include the peoples of Negros, Cebu, Bohol, Leyte, Samar, and other surrounding islands as culture and languages spread throughout the Visayas region.

Precolonial Visayan society was organized into barangays led by a datu. These communities had established social classes, including nobles (timawa or tumao), freemen (oripun or alipin), and slaves, along with active trade networks reaching China, Southeast Asia, and other Philippine islands. Pottery, beads, metal goods, and textiles formed part of a thriving commercial exchange long before Spanish colonization.

== Spanish colonial era (1565–1898) ==
=== Early settlement ===
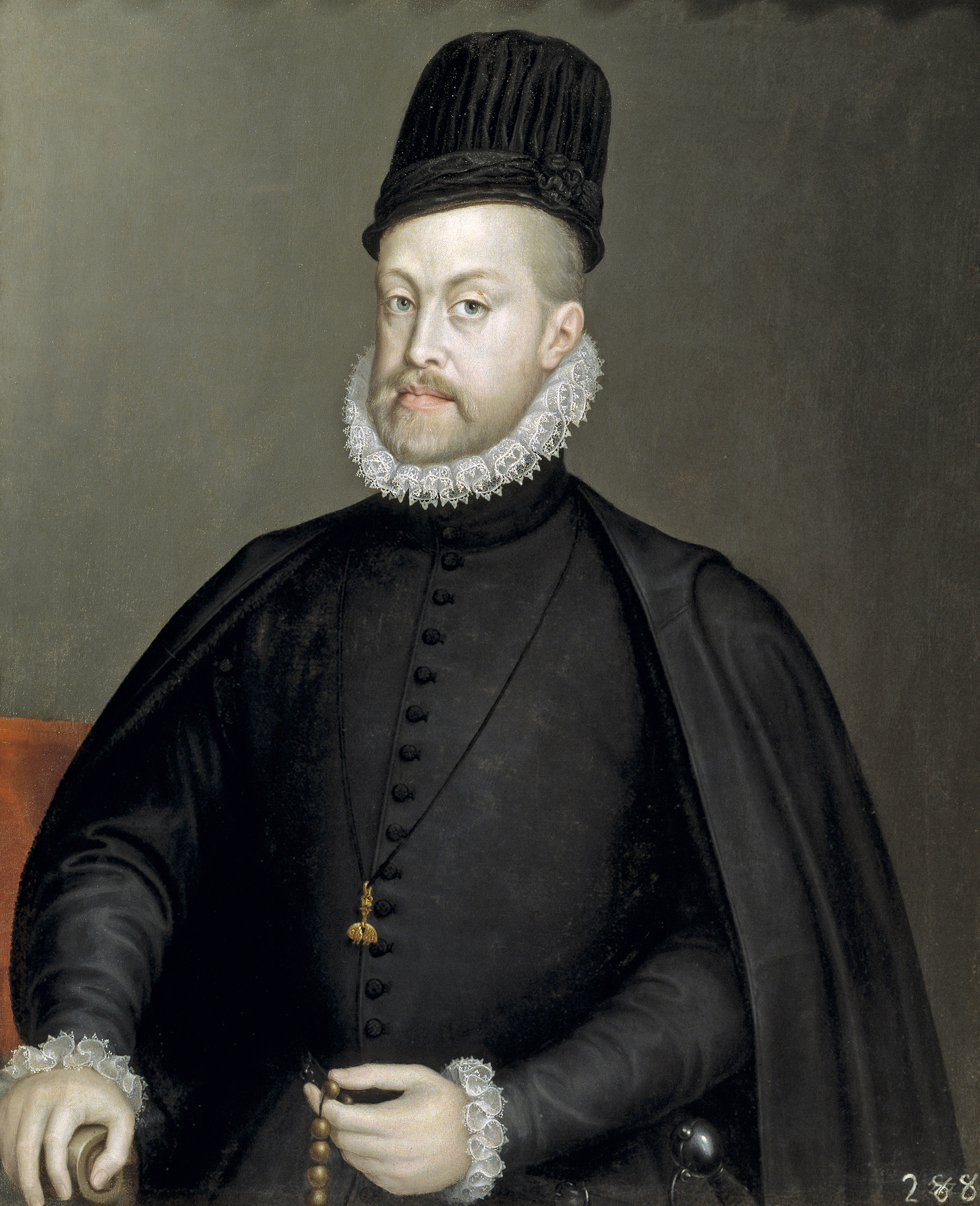
Philip II of Spain, namesake of the Philippines

Under King Philip II, in 1565, Spaniards from New Spain returned to Cebu to avenge Ferdinand Magellan's death. Miguel López de Legazpi led the expedition, which pillaged and burned houses in Cebu; many Cebuanos retreated in the face of the well-armed Spaniards, who fielded reformed infantry units known as tercios composed of alabardero, alférez with a sword, and arcabucero with firearms. Legazpi dispatched Felipe de Salcedo, along with Spanish friar Martín de Rada and other Augustinian missionaries, to seek provisions. They landed in Panay, establishing a temporary settlement near the Araut River in Dumangas.

In 1566, a more permanent settlement was founded in the town of Ogtong, present-day Oton, which became the earliest Spanish administrative center on Panay Island. Gonzalo Ronquillo served as the town's first encomendero. Although Ogtong was formally established in 1572 as the second official Spanish colonial outpost after Cebu, the settlement had already been active since 1566 with about eighty Spaniards from Europe. Reinforcements arrived in 1603, 1636, 1670, and 1672, composed of 66, 50, 169, and another 169 Mexican soldiers, respectively. By 1586, there were about twenty Spanish households and a garrison reinforced by roughly thirty Spanish or Mexican soldiers. By the 1700s, Iloilo had an estimated 166 Spanish Filipino families and 29,723 native families.

Unlike the Indianized Cebuanos, who were relatively neutral toward the Spaniards, or the partially Islamized Tagalogs of Manila, who were often hostile, the people of Panay welcomed the Iberians as allies. At that time, Panay was engaged in conflicts with Muslim polities, particularly the Sultanate of Brunei and its vassal states, the Sultanate of Sulu, and the Kingdom of Maynila, which, according to Spanish Governor-General Francisco de Sande, were related to each other by blood ties. The people of Panay largely accepted Christianity and supplied many of the native mercenaries used in Spanish campaigns, including operations against partly Islamized Manila.

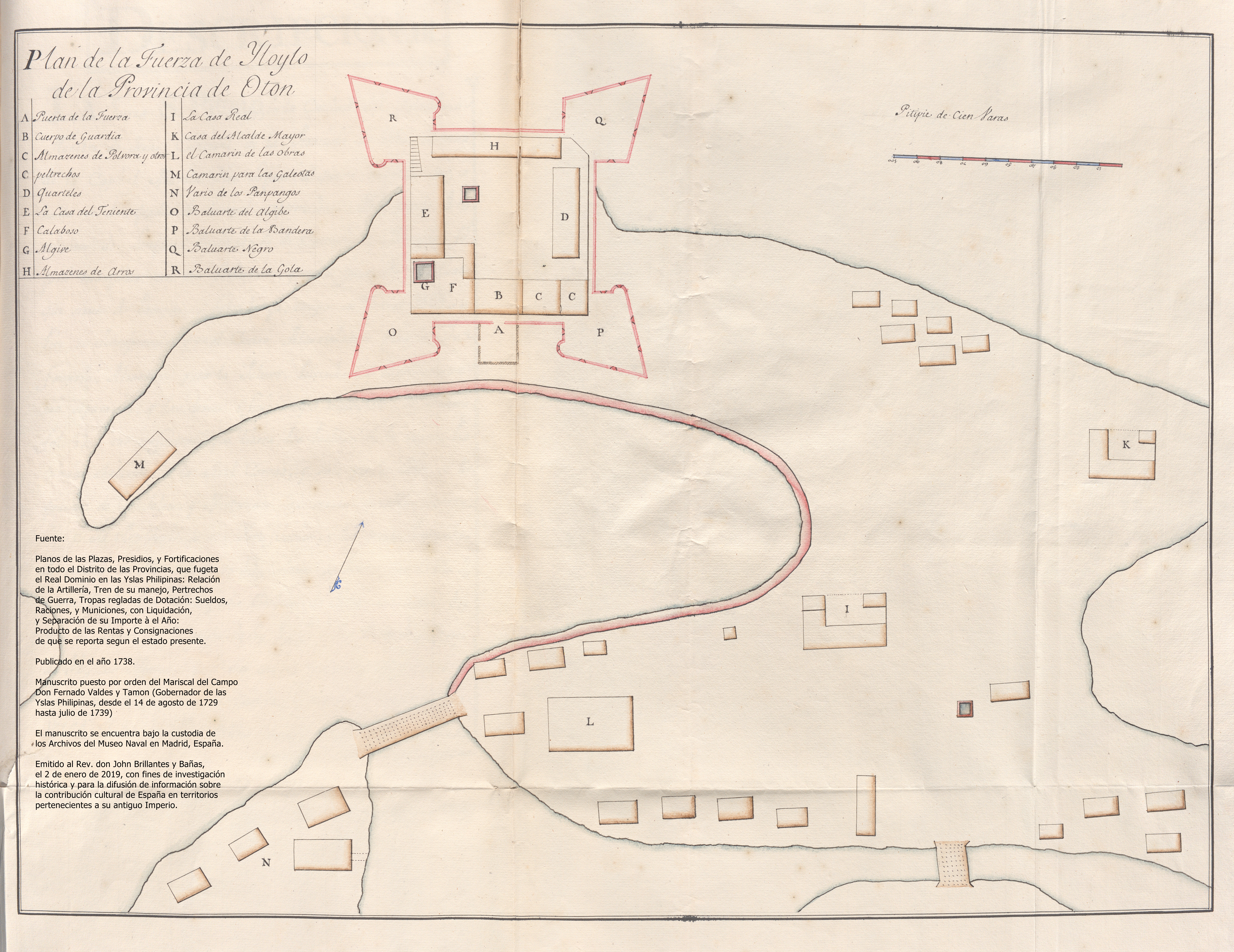
Drafted plan of the Fort of Iloilo in 1738, originally named the Fortificación de Nuestra Señora del Rosario en el Puerto de Yloylo

In 1581, Ronquillo, now Governor-General, established a larger settlement in Arevalo, east of Ogtong, naming it La Nueva Villa de Arevalo after his hometown in Spain. The settlement became known for shipbuilding and eventually came to be called La Villa Rica de Arevalo, one of the six Spanish royal cities in the Philippines at the time. In 1600, a large Muslim force of about 70 ships and 4,000 warriors attacked the town. The invasion was repelled by approximately 1,000 Visayan warriors and 70 Mexican arquebusiers under Juan Garcia de Sierra, the Spanish alcalde mayor, who was killed in the battle. As Moro incursions increased, Pedro Bravo de Acuña, the new Governor-General, built a small wooden fortress to defend the coast. The fortification was located on an islet in the Batiano Estuary called Catalman, meaning "pointed," and also as Irong-irong or Ilong-ilong, meaning "nose-like." The Spaniards initially called the area La Punta, but the indigenous name persisted and was eventually hispanized into Iloilo. The wooden fort was later developed into the stone-built Fort San Pedro, and the Spanish officials transferred administrative power to the area from Arevalo, in 1700.

On September 28, 1616, Dutch forces launched an attack on Iloilo. Spanish defenders led by Diego Quiñones fortified the town with redoubts and trenches covered with sawali. During the battle, according to local tradition, Quiñones stumbled upon a buried wooden box containing an image of the Virgin Mary holding the Child Jesus. The soldiers carried the image in procession to the fort and prayed for protection. On the night of the 30th day, the Dutch unexpectedly withdrew, abandoning their dead and wounded. The victory was regarded as miraculous, and the event began the long-standing Ilonggo devotion to Our Lady of the Holy Rosary.

=== Textile and sugar industry ===
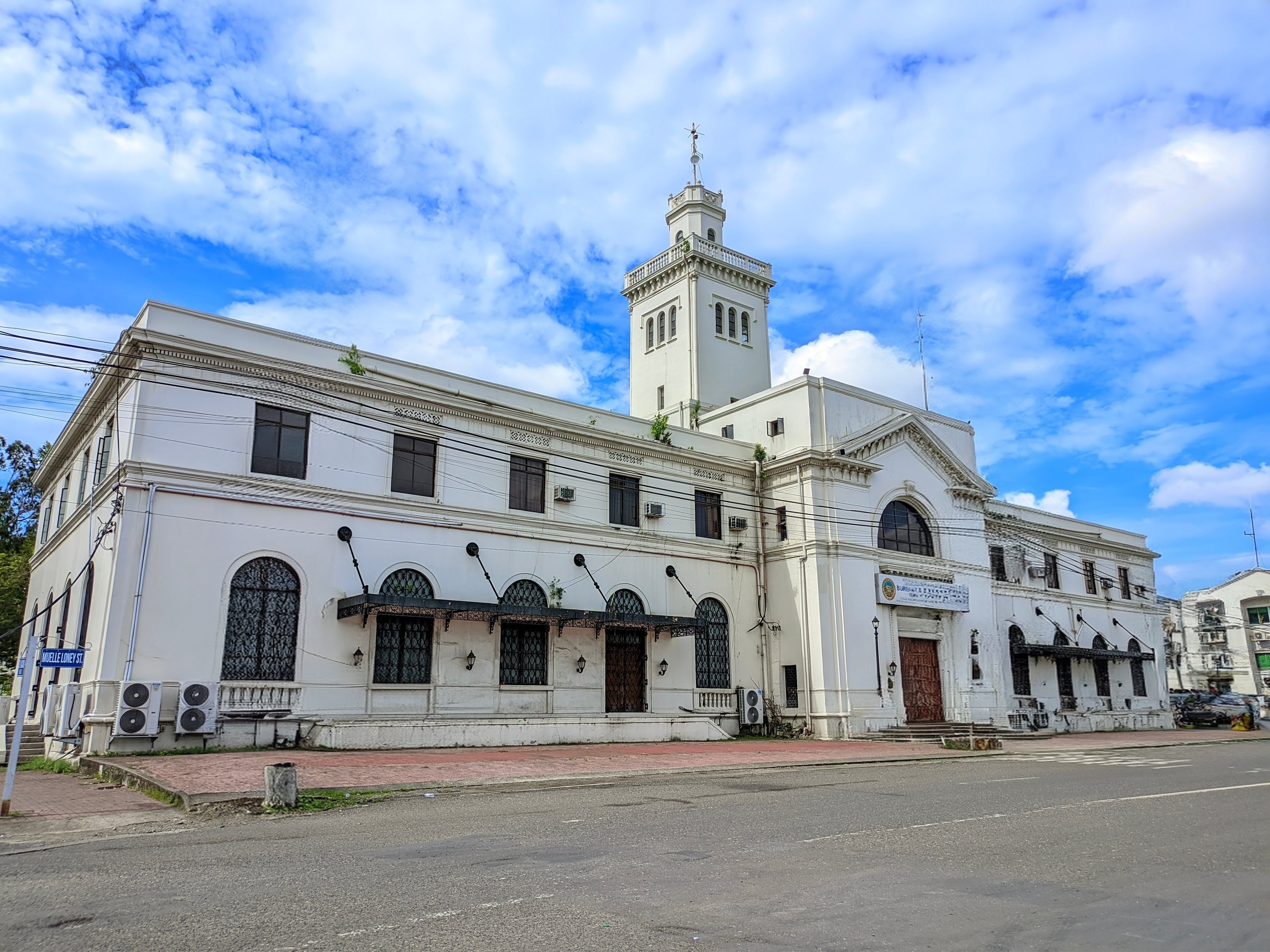
Iloilo Customs House is the second-largest customs house in the Philippines after the Aduana de Manila in Intramuros

By the 18th century, Iloilo had transformed from a military outpost into a growing commercial center. During this period, local authorities encouraged Chinese migrants to settle in the area and contribute to trade and local industries. Alongside them were Latin Americans from the Viceroyalty of New Spain, who were brought to Iloilo to support fortification work and administrative duties. Their presence helped strengthen the social and economic foundation of the region.

Toward the late 1700s, Iloilo's economy surged with the rise of its weaving industry. Local production of sinamay, piña, jusi, and hablon reached large-scale levels, earning Iloilo the title "Textile Capital of the Philippines." These fabrics were highly valued and were exported to Manila and abroad, creating new wealth and establishing a prosperous Ilonggo upper middle class. However, by the mid-19th century, Iloilo's weaving industry began to decline. The arrival of cheap, machine-made textiles from the United Kingdom overwhelmed local handwoven products in both price and volume.

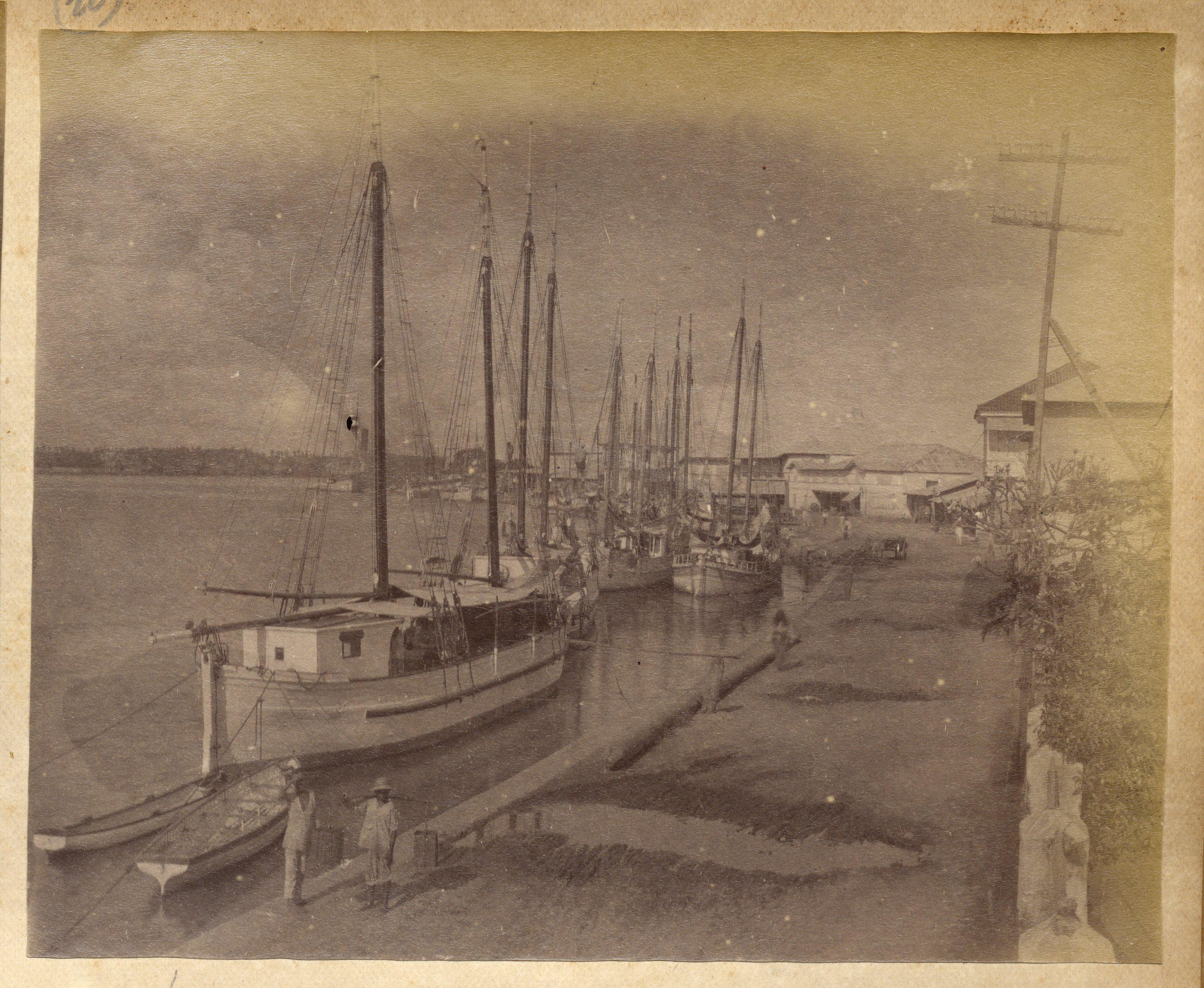
The view of the Port of Iloilo's harbor and warehouses in 1894

A major turning point arrived when Queen Isabela II, through a Royal Order dated September 5, 1855, opened the Port of Iloilo to international trade. With this development, Iloilo began exporting jusi, sinamay, cotton fabrics, tobacco, abaca, dyewood, and sugar directly to foreign markets. The opening attracted foreign businessmen and marked the beginning of rapid commercial expansion. In 1856, Nicholas Loney, a British merchant, arrived as Vice Consul of Great Britain in Iloilo. Seeing that Ilonggo farmers still used primitive farming and milling tools, Loney pushed for the modernization of the region's agricultural industry. He offered iron plows and modern milling machinery on interest-free credit, with Ker & Co. and other British firms supplying the equipment.

As weaving declined, sugar emerged as the new economic powerhouse. Worldwide demand for sugar surged in the late 19th century, and Iloilo, along with nearby Negros, capitalized on this boom. Loney's introduction of modern equipment, along with his construction of warehouses and establishment of direct foreign trade connections, fueled massive expansion. Wealthy Ilonggo families began establishing large haciendas in Negros, and by 1885, Iloilo was exporting 100,000 tons of sugar annually. The town soon witnessed the rise of new schools, banks, trading houses, shipping facilities, and foreign consulates, and became the major commercial hub of the Visayas.

==== Cityhood ====
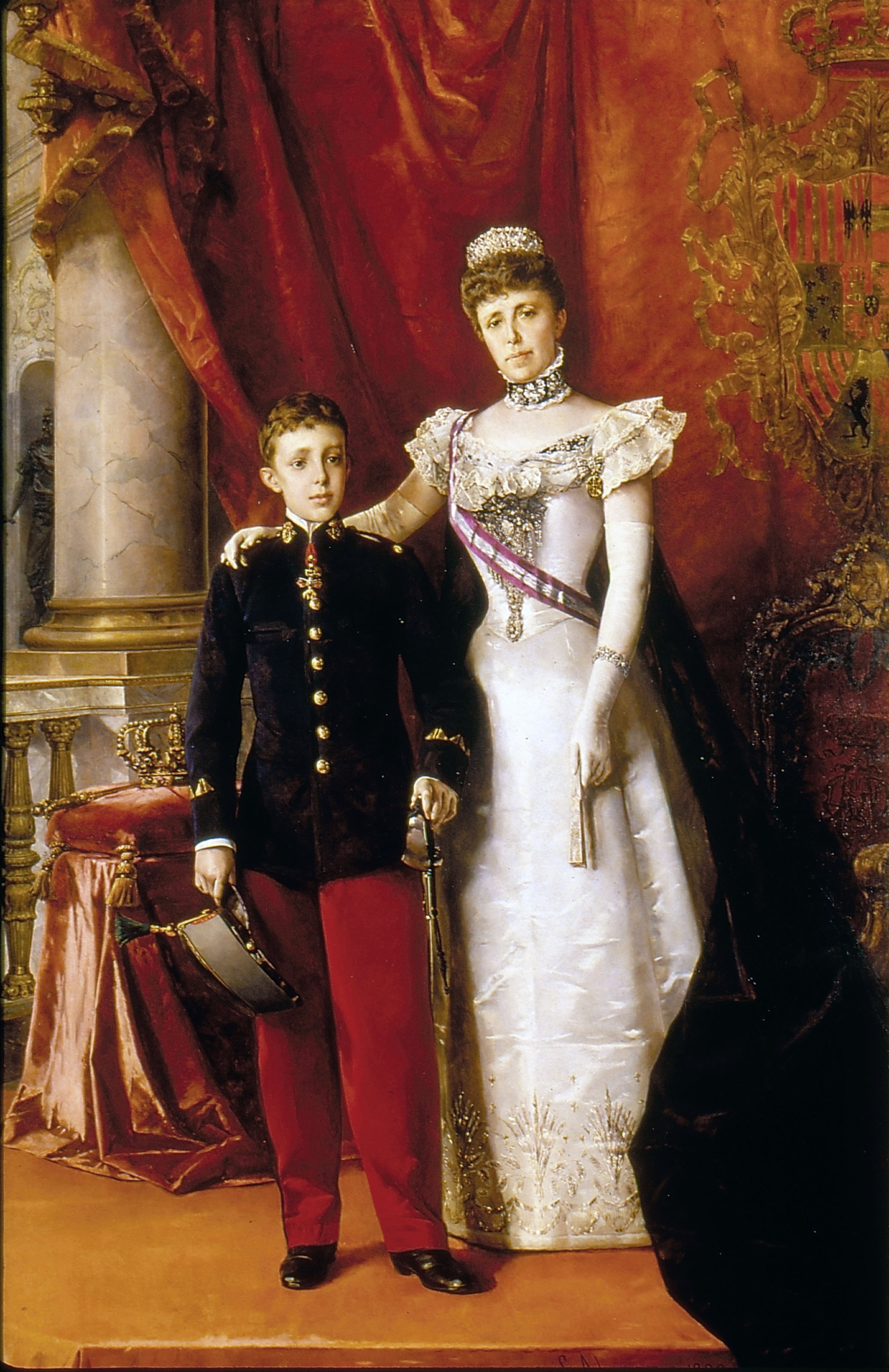
Maria Christina of Austria and her son Alfonso XIII, under whose authority Iloilo was granted city status

In 1888, Governor-General Valeriano Weyler recommended establishing ayuntamientos or city halls across key provinces to improve governance and manage growing economic activity. Recognizing Iloilo's rapid commercial expansion, especially its booming sugar economy and foreign trade, Spain granted Iloilo special royal attention. On October 5, 1889, Queen Regent Maria Christina of Austria, acting on behalf of her son, the young King Alfonso XIII, issued a Royal Decree elevating Iloilo from a town to a city. The declaration emphasized Iloilo's growing industries, its international trade, and its status as the second most important urban center in the Philippines after Manila.

To formalize this transition, Overseas Minister Manuel Becerra later issued another decree on November 12, 1889, establishing the Ayuntamiento of Iloilo, which was officially created by a Superior Decree on January 31, 1890. The Ayuntamiento of Iloilo was inaugurated on February 7, 1890, followed a year later by the establishment of the Ayuntamiento of Jaro, another progressive city located just north of Iloilo. Don Tirso Lizarraga became the first mayor, with Don Sabino Ordaz and Don Isidro de la Rama serving as vice mayors. Nine other council members and a treasurer completed the city government.

=== Revolution and uprising ===
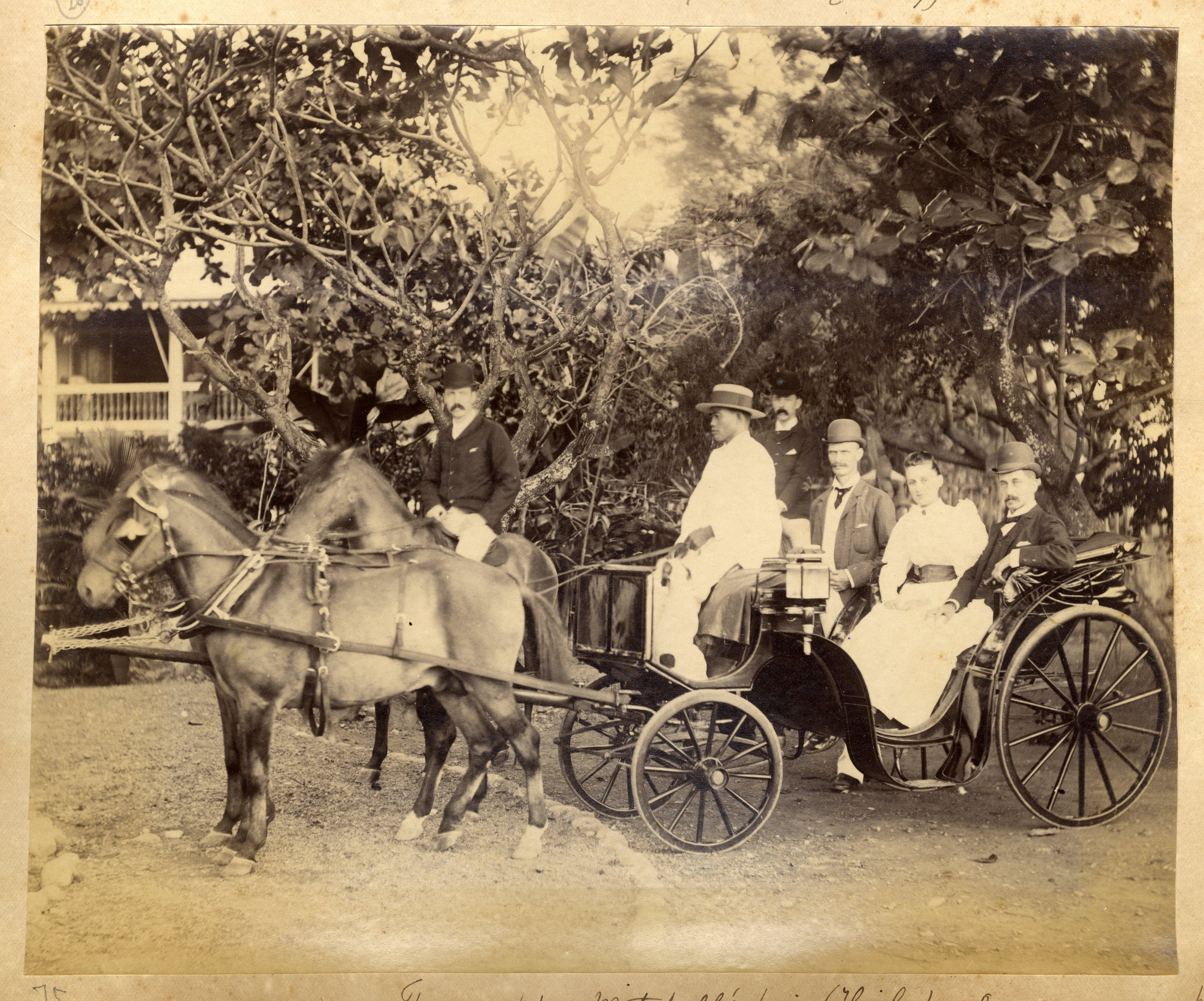
Iloilo's elite in a carriage, 1894

By the late 19th century, Iloilo had become a prosperous city and had raised the standard of living for its principalia and ilustrado class due to its thriving sugar industry, export trade, and commercial activity. On the onset of the Philippine Revolution in Manila on August 30, 1896, the Ilonggo elite, through the Iloilo and Jaro ayuntamientos, including the nearby towns of Molo, Mandurriao, and Arevalo, condemned the uprising. Nearby provinces such as Antique, Capiz, and Negros also followed suit. Demonstrating loyalty to Spain, the Ilonggo elite organized volunteers to assist in quelling the rebellion in Manila. Five hundred Ilonggo troops formed the Ilonggo Volunteer Battalion under mostly Spanish leadership. Divided into two companies, they participated in campaigns against revolutionary forces of Emilio Aguinaldo in Cavite and Pampanga in 1897, achieving a series of victories.

Following the Pact of Biak-na-Bato in April 1898, the Ilonggo Battalion returned home. Unnoticed by the Spanish crown for their support, the city was nevertheless recognized on March 1, 1898, by Queen Regent Maria Christina with a royal decree awarding Iloilo the perpetual title of La Muy Leal y Noble Ciudad or "The Most Loyal and Noble City." Because of the special recognition and Iloilo's favored status under the Spanish monarchy, the city earned the nickname the "Queen's Favored City in the South", or simply the "Queen's City in the South", which eventually evolved into the "Queen City of the South," reflecting its economic importance next to Manila.

As revolutionary sentiment spread across the archipelago, on March 18, 1898, the Comité de Conspiradores was organized in Molo by Roque Lopez and Pablo Araneta to plot against the Spanish government. The group was later renamed the Comité de Visayas. After the Spanish defeat at the Battle of Manila Bay, Governor-General Diego de los Ríos relocated the provisional Spanish government to Iloilo City, making it the administrative center of the remaining Spanish authority while peace terms were being negotiated. He attempted to maintain control by forming a Council of Reforms with all Ilonggo members, but the effort was doomed, as revolutionary movements across the Philippines were already in motion.

Plaza Libertad, the site of the 1898 surrender of Spanish forces in Iloilo

By November 17, 1898, revolutionary forces raised the Philippine flag in Santa Barbara, Iloilo, and expanded their influence throughout surrounding towns. Most of Panay Island was under revolutionary control, with the exception of Iloilo City and adjacent areas. On December 2, 1898, the Federal State of the Visayas was proclaimed, federating cantonal governments in Panay, Negros, Bohol, and Romblon. Roque Lopez served as its president, with Iloilo City functioning as the regional seat.

Finally, on the morning of December 25, 1898, Spanish officials formally surrendered Plaza Alfonso XII, now Plaza Libertad, to General Martín Delgado, marking the end of Spanish rule in Iloilo and making the city briefly the last Spanish capital in Asia and the Pacific. American forces arrived on December 27, 1898, and were gradually reinforced to occupy the city in accordance with the Treaty of Paris. Resistance and skirmishes persisted throughout the province until 1901, when civilian municipal administrations were reconstituted under American oversight, completing the transition from Spanish to American colonial governance.

== American colonial era (1898–1941) ==
=== Philippine–American War ===
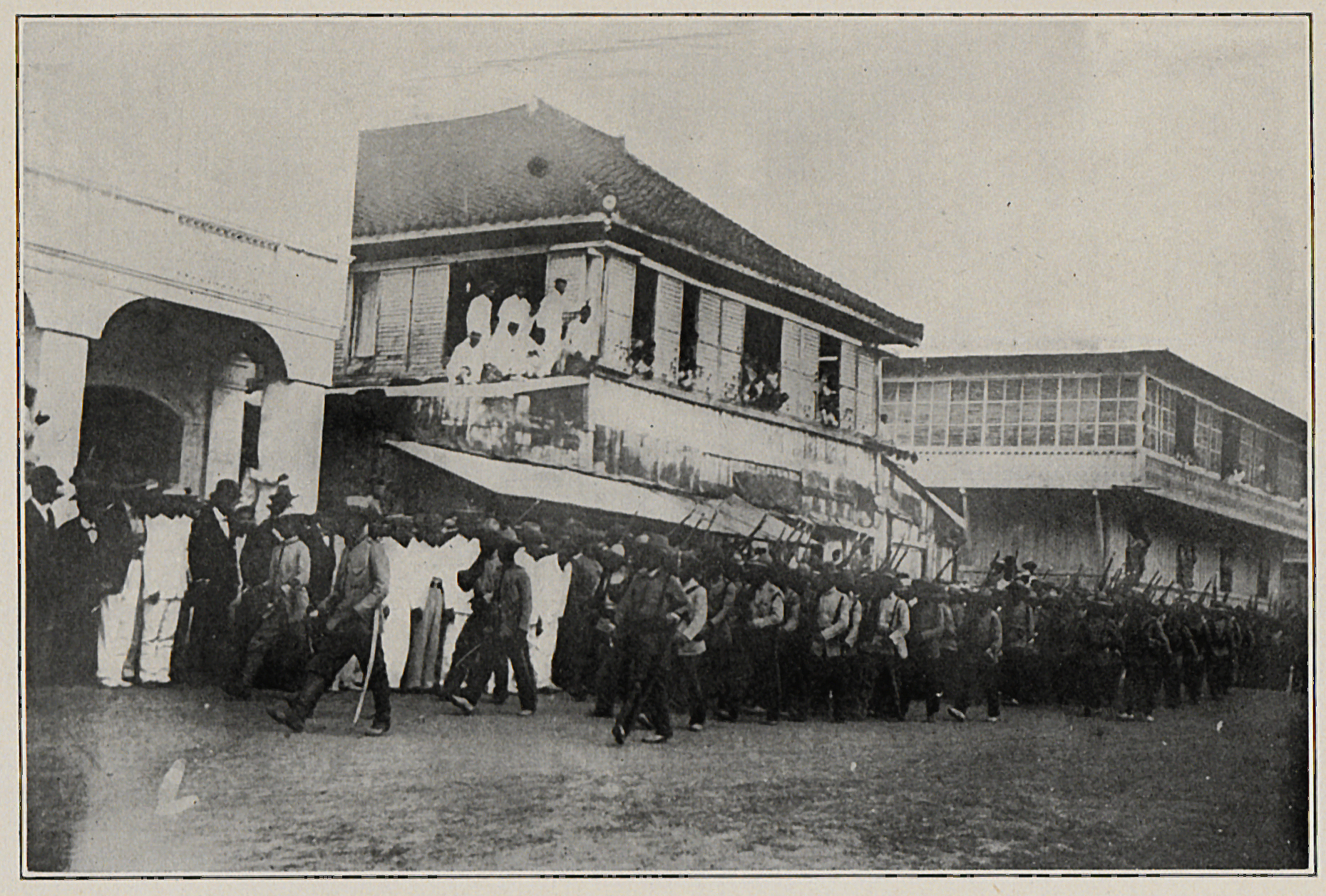
General Martín Teófilo Delgado marching in 1901 ahead of 30 officers and 140 men to surrender to Brigadier General Robert Patterson Hughes, regional commander of the U.S. forces occupying the country

After the Spanish surrender in December 1898, revolutionary forces in Iloilo made a formal entry into the city, greeted with music and banners, and constituted a local government. On January 17, 1899, an election was held, placing Raymundo Melliza, a respected member of a notable Molo family, as Mayor. Despite this, the influence of the revolutionary government under Aguinaldo extended only a short distance from the city, as American forces were already waiting for a signal from Manila. Two additional American ships reinforced the U.S. presence, although no clashes occurred immediately after the Spaniards' departure.

By February 4, hostilities had broken out between Aguinaldo's forces and the Americans in Luzon. Emissaries delivered messages urging the Ilonggos to hold the city against the incoming Americans. Upon receipt of orders from Manila, General Miller renewed demands for the surrender of Iloilo, threatening bombardment by February 12. On February 10, an extraordinary session at the City Hall debated plans for the city's defense. Some advocated burning Iloilo to deny it to the Americans, but Mayor Melliza protested, recognizing the threat to property and civilians. Nevertheless, a majority of the council, influenced by mercenary soldiers with no local ties, approved the measure.

The American bombardment began on February 11, 1899. Early that morning, retreating revolutionary troops and rioters set fire to petroleum-smeared houses. Chinese, European, and Spanish residents tried to protect their property, sometimes through bribery. British warships intervened, sending marines to safeguard foreign-owned properties. By 1:00 p.m., American forces had landed and restored order. Claims for damages were later submitted but rejected by the U.S. military authorities. The destruction left Iloilo City largely in ruins. A 1909 article in the local newspaper Nuevo Heraldo summarized the devastation:

"The fire left behind only the name Iloilo, as the main part of the city was reduced to ashes by the retreating Ilongo troops. That event was the cause of the ruin of such a beautiful city, second only to Manila..."

Despite the devastation, resistance continued in Iloilo and surrounding towns until 1901. The city was among the last in the Philippines to fall under American control. Some revolutionary leaders, including General Martín Delgado, eventually surrendered and were reintegrated into local society. Delgado later served as Governor of Iloilo from 1901 to 1904 under American rule, becoming the highest-paid provincial governor in the archipelago.

=== Reincorporation and re-charter ===
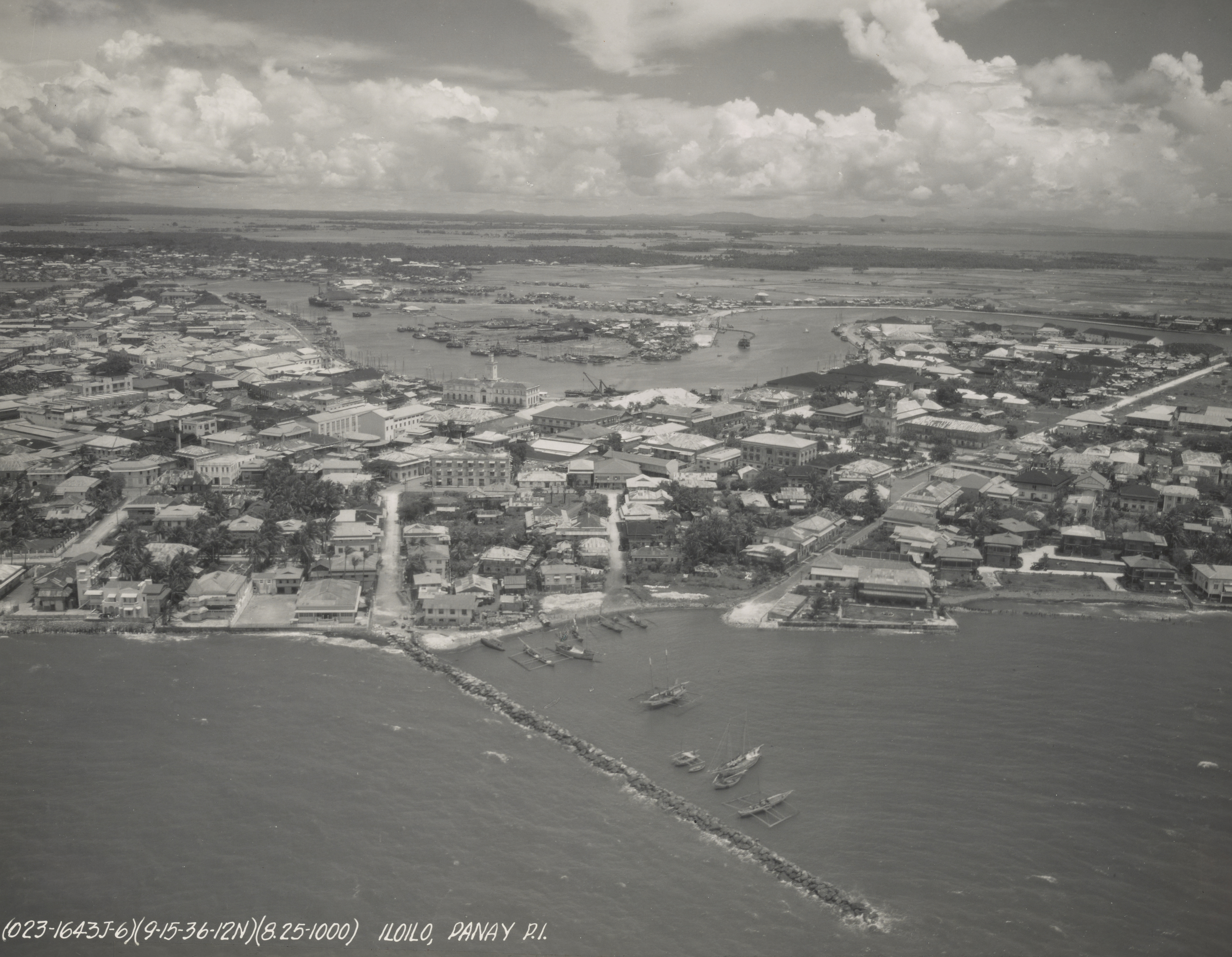
Aerial view of Iloilo City in 1936

By April 1901, American forces had largely restored order, and local governments were established across Iloilo Province. During this period, surrounding municipalities, such as Molo, Mandurriao, La Paz, and later Jaro, were gradually incorporated into the city's territory, laying the foundation for its eventual Commonwealth-era expansion. However, La Paz and Jaro regained separate status in 1920.

Congressman Cresenciano Lozano authored the bill for the city's elevation, enacted on October 20, 1936. This charter established the City Government of Iloilo, initially covering the town of Iloilo, which already included Molo and Mandurriao. A few weeks later, the charter was amended to incorporate La Paz and Arevalo, creating a city population large enough to meet legal requirements.

Although the charter specified conditions for city inauguration, delays in elections meant the formal assumption of office did not occur immediately. On August 25, 1937, the City of Iloilo was officially inaugurated, with Dr. Ramon J. Campos sworn in as the first City Mayor, succeeding Eulogio Garganera, the last municipal president. Later, the town of Jaro was incorporated into Iloilo City in January 1941, completing the city's territorial expansion. This reorganization designated the former towns into districts of the City of Iloilo, which came to comprise six: Iloilo proper, Jaro, Molo, Arevalo, La Paz, and Mandurriao.

=== Golden era ===
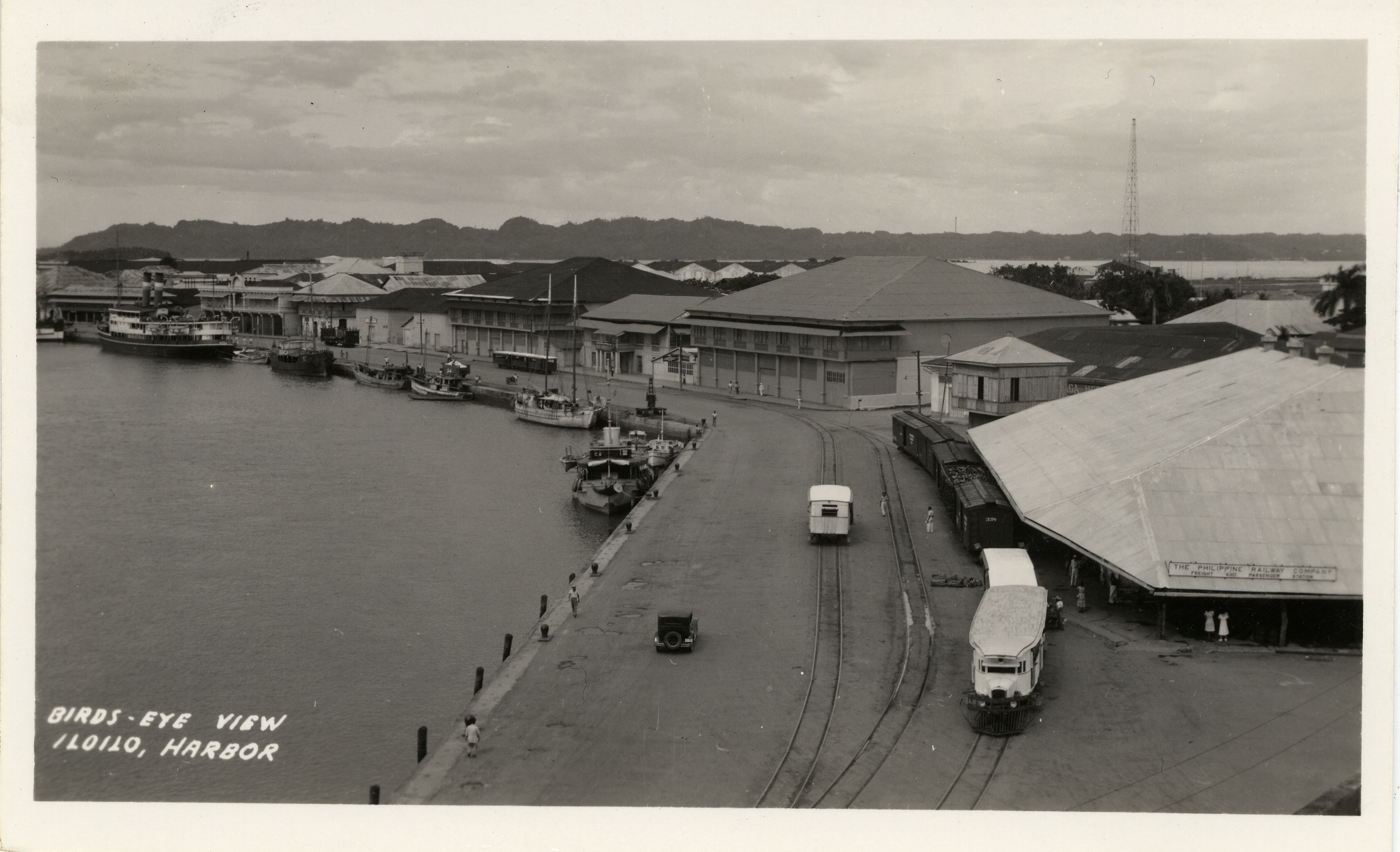
The Panay Railways terminal at Muelle Loney Wharf, c. 1920s–1930s

Under American administration, Iloilo underwent significant modernization marked by expanded public works, the growth of educational and religious institutions, and increased economic activity. Following the reorganization of municipal governments in the early 1900s and the stabilization of political authority, the city began to recover from the damage caused by the Philippine–American War. The American colonial government implemented major infrastructure improvements, including the construction, widening, and upgrading of roads. The operation of the Panay railway further supported commercial activity by allowing sugar and agricultural products from across Panay to reach Muelle Loney more efficiently. The sugar industry reached its peak during this period, contributing to the rise of an affluent Ilonggo elite commonly referred to as the Sugar Barons. Their wealth encouraged the construction of large residences in districts such as Jaro and Molo and introduced architectural styles including Art Deco, Beaux-Arts, Art Nouveau, and Neo-Classical along Calle Real and the surrounding commercial area.

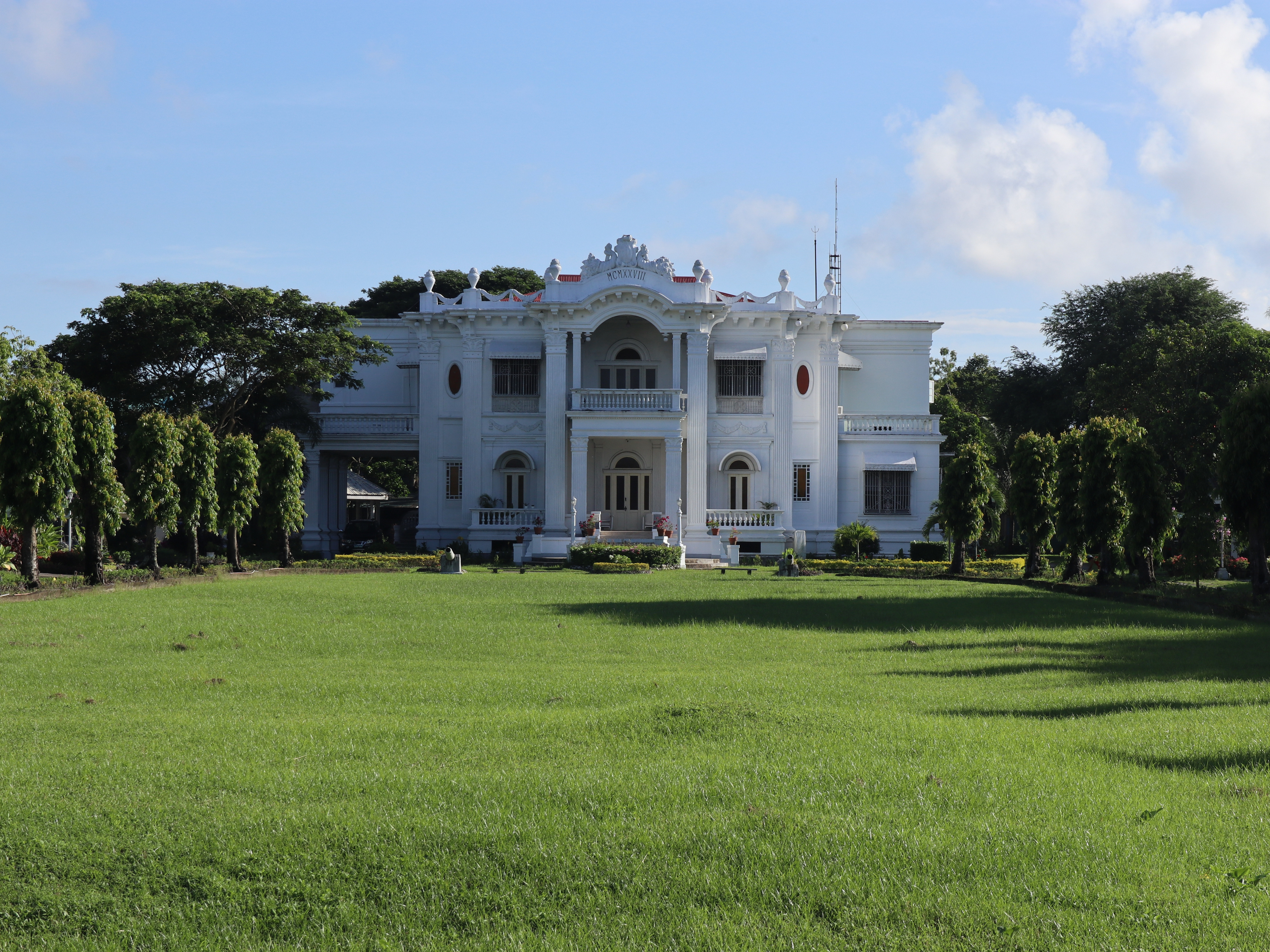
The Lopez Heritage House is one of the grand mansions whose prominence reflects the influence of the sugar boom

Iloilo also developed as an educational and religious center. American education policies introduced English as the medium of instruction and expanded public schooling, which led to the establishment of institutions such as Iloilo Normal School, Iloilo National High School, and Baluarte Elementary School. Protestant missionaries founded Iloilo Mission Hospital in 1901 and later established Central Philippine University (CPU) in 1905, which adopted work study programs and student self-governance. Baptist, Presbyterian, and Adventist organizations were active in the city. Catholic institutions also expanded through the Augustinians, who developed the school that would later become the University of San Agustin (USA), and through the Paulinian Sisters, who established St. Paul's Hospital and St. Paul University Iloilo (SPUI).

The period also saw the rise of several Ilonggos in national government. Nicholas Jalandoni became the youngest member and later the first Speaker of the Philippine Legislature. Victorino Mapa and Ramón Avanceña both served as Chief Justices of the Supreme Court. Senators Ruperto Montinola and José María Arroyo were influential national figures. Ilongga women, including Pura Villanueva Kalaw and Sofia de Veyra, were active in the national suffrage movement and contributed to early advocacy for women's rights in the Philippines.

Iloilo City in its heyday during the American period

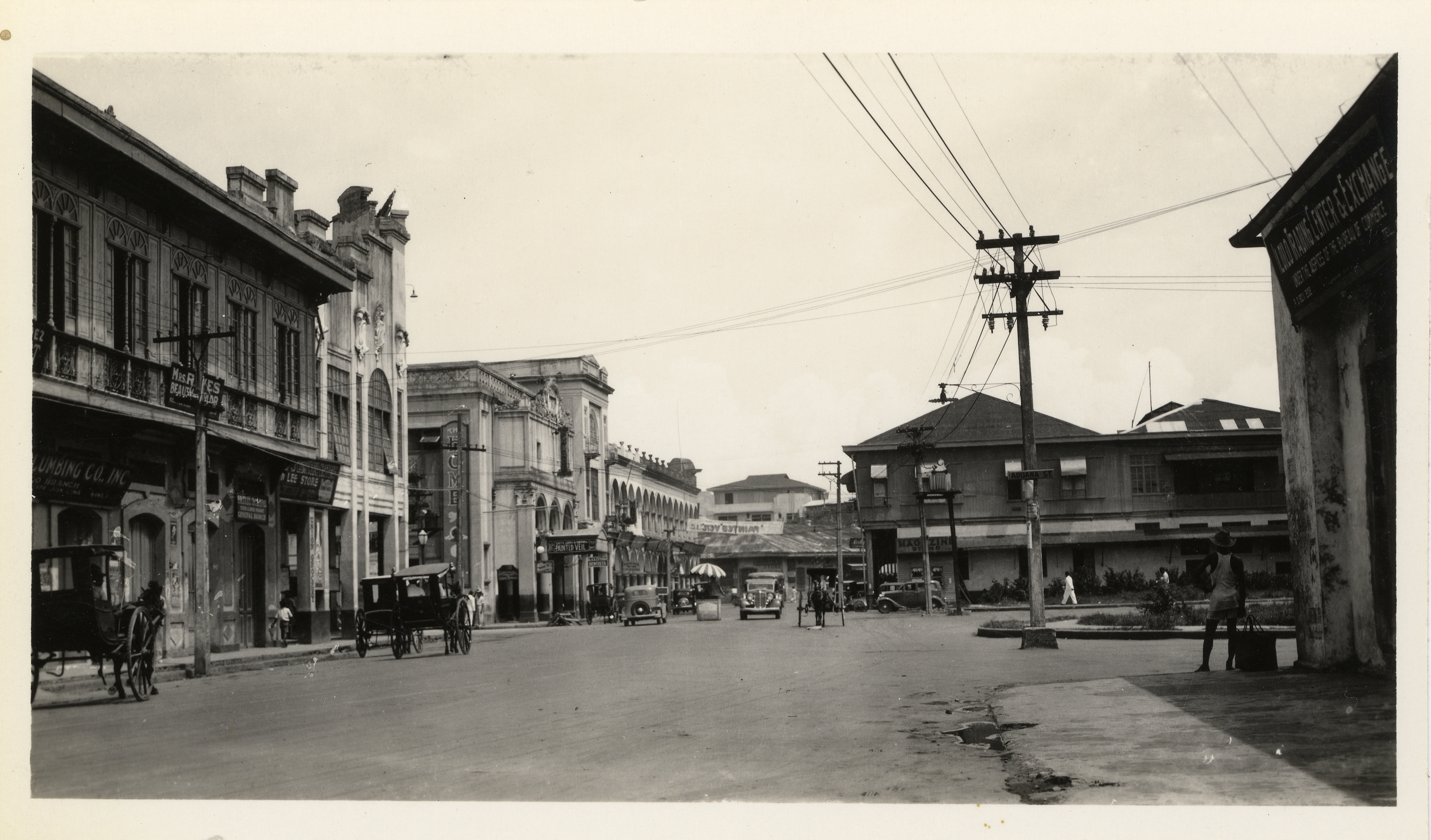
J.M. Basa Street, widely known as Calle Real

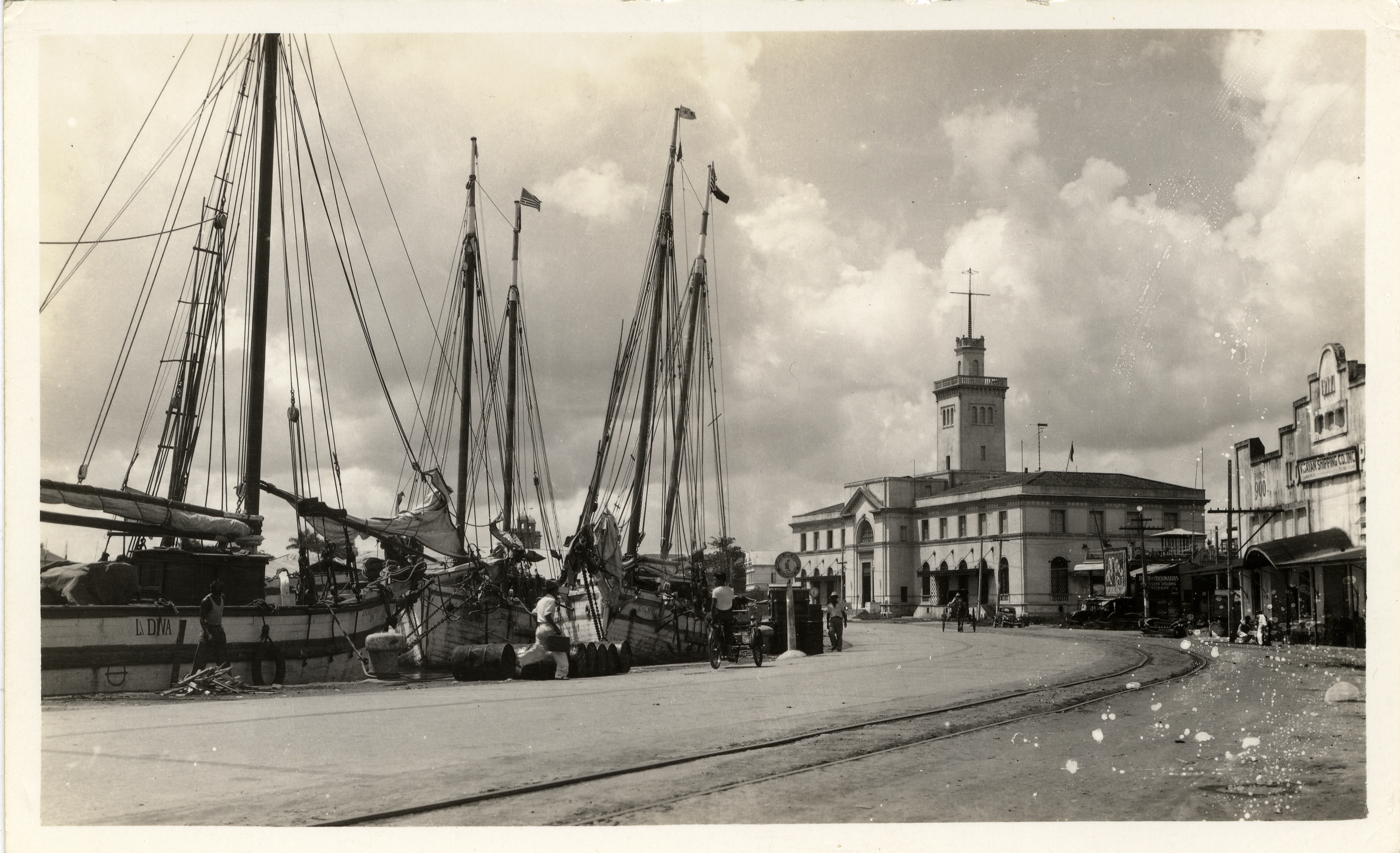
Sailing ships at the Muelle Loney wharf

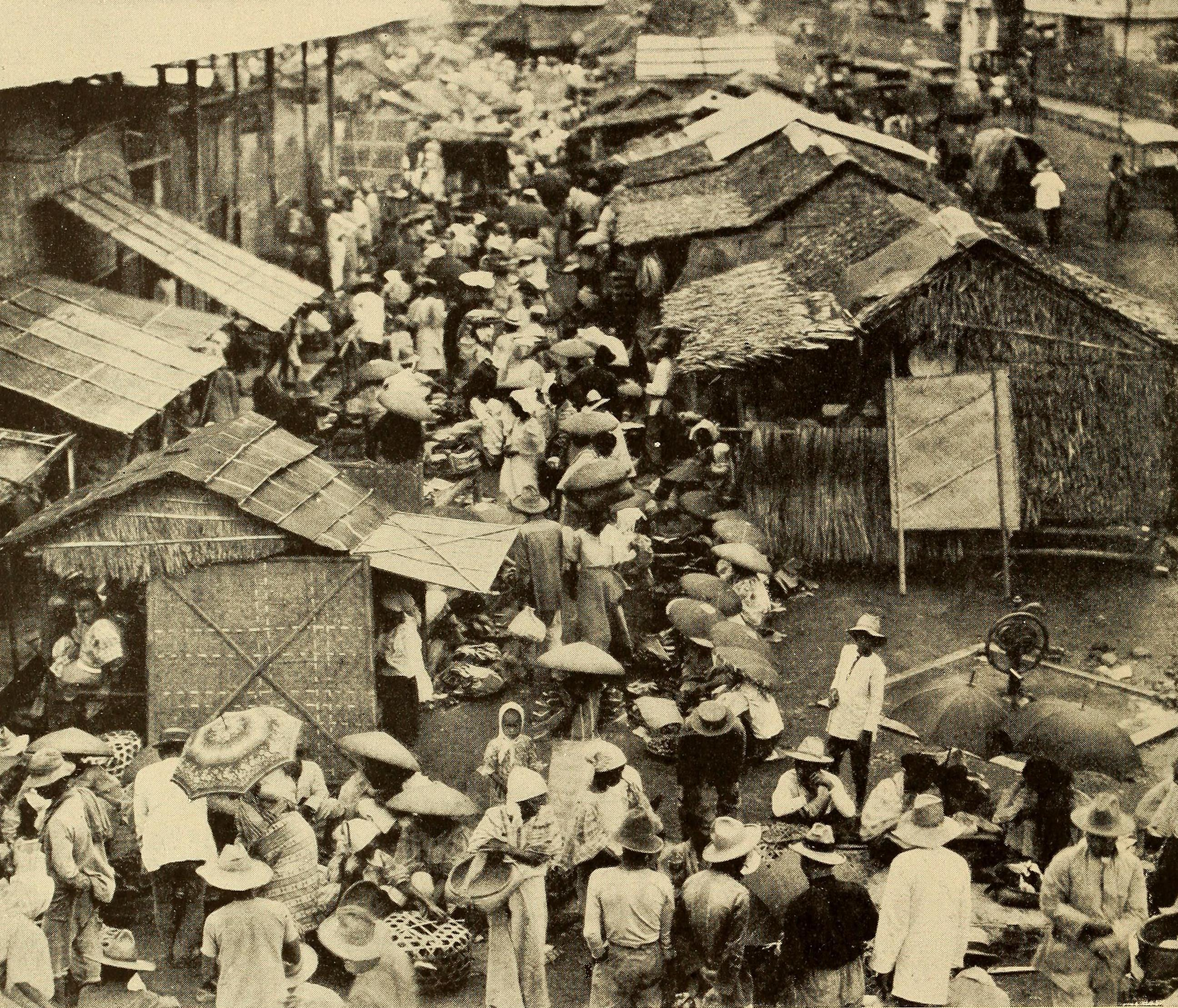
A market in Iloilo

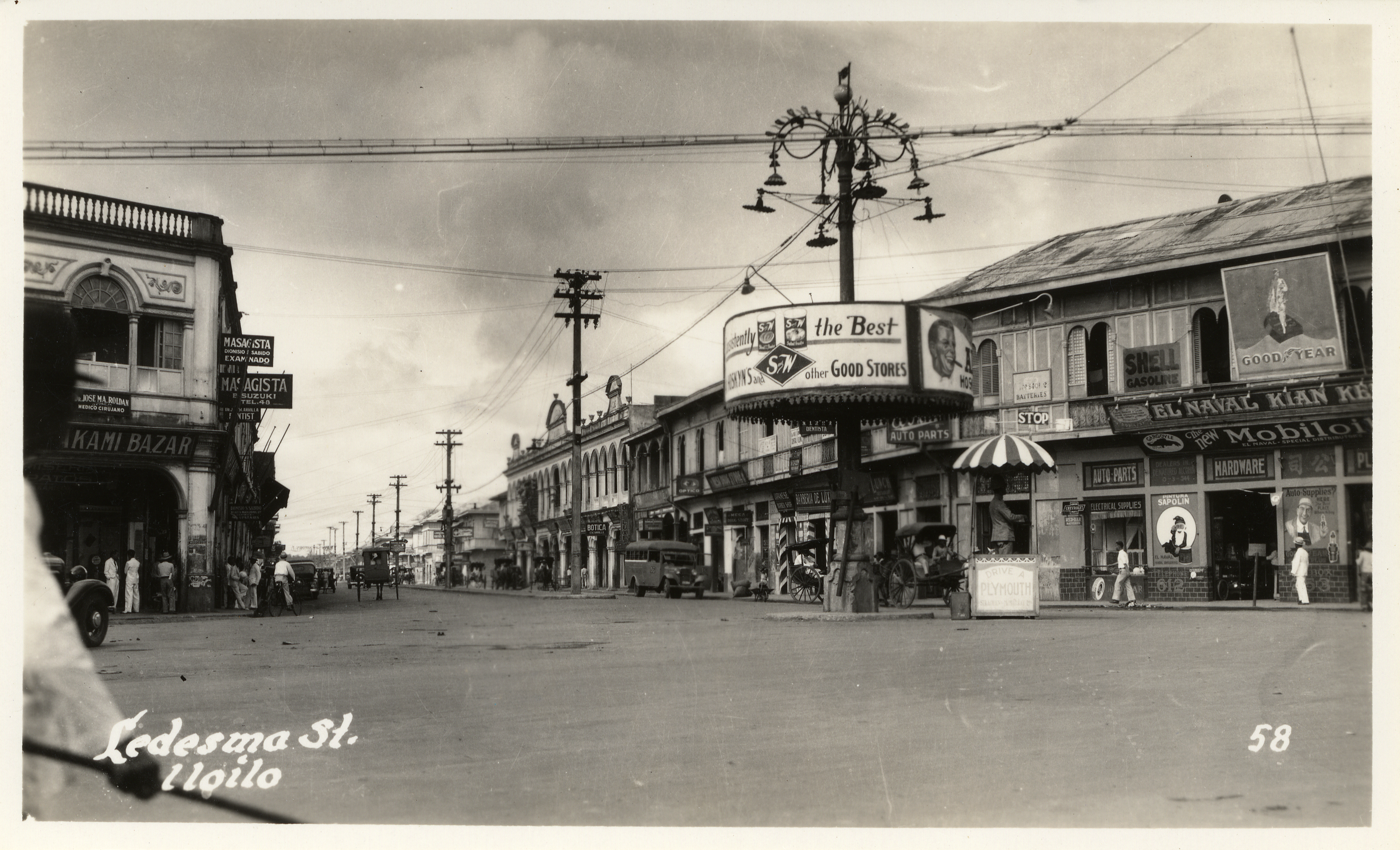
View of Ledesma Street from Plazoleta Gay, a road junction

== Japanese occupation (1942–1945) ==
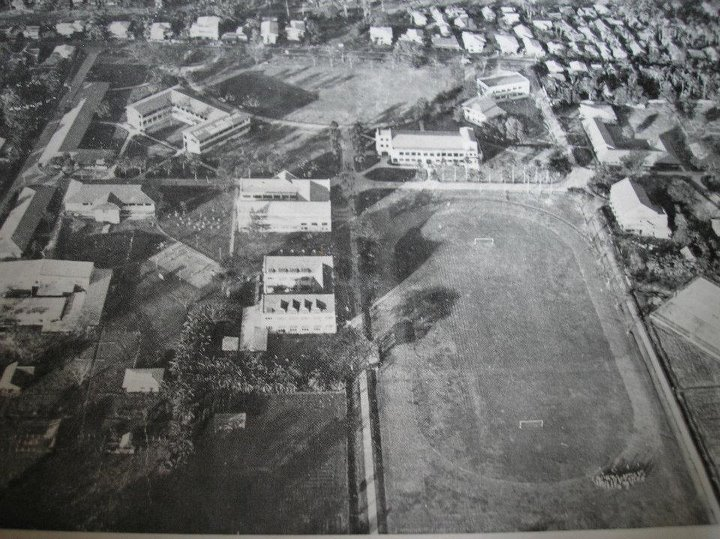
Central Philippine University's main campus suffered extensive destruction during World War II

In April 1942, Japanese forces occupied Iloilo City, halting its growing economy and placing Panay under strict military rule. Several Ilonggos joined the guerrilla resistance, including the units of Macario Peralta Jr., whose forces eventually liberated most of Panay's interior and were regarded by other guerrilla networks as primus inter pares due to their effectiveness. Governor Fermin Caram accepted the position of provincial governor under Japanese supervision after being authorized by Governor Tomas Confesor, who had gone to the mountains to join the guerrillas. With no functioning city government, Iloilo was directly administered by the Japanese through the office of the governor.

Life during the occupation was marked by hardship and abuse. Japanese troops established "comfort stations" in Iloilo in 1942 where Filipino women were imprisoned, assaulted, and killed. These atrocities formed some of the darkest chapters of the war in the region.

By early 1945, as American forces prepared to return to Iloilo, General Robert Shoe planned to bomb the city to drive out any remaining Japanese troops. Governor Fermin Caram learned of the plan and, knowing the Japanese had already abandoned the city, devised a way to prevent its destruction. Large letters spelling "NO JAPS HERE" were arranged on the ground using linen and lime. When American pilots flew over, they spotted the message and dropped a sandbag containing a note that read message received, notified headquarters. The bombing was cancelled, sparing countless lives and preserving the city from further devastation.

On March 18, 1945, American forces landed in Tigbauan and began the liberation of Iloilo and the rest of Panay. By March 25, the city was fully secured, and remnants of Japanese battalions were detained in Jaro Plaza, which temporarily served as a holding facility. Three days later, crowds gathered at Plaza de Aduana, later renamed Sunburst Park after the American division that liberated Panay, to celebrate the victory alongside Filipino and American troops. During the transition to postwar governance, Mariano Benedicto was appointed as City Mayor, marking the beginning of Iloilo's recovery from the trauma and destruction of the war.

== Post-war and independence era (1945–1986) ==
World War II left Iloilo City heavily devastated. Much of its infrastructure, businesses, and civic buildings were damaged or completely destroyed, forcing local government efforts to focus largely on rebuilding. The prewar city hall, designed by Juan Arellano and completed on December 19, 1936, stood as one of the few major structures that survived. In 1947, Mayor Fernando Lopez and the city council passed a resolution donating the building to the University of the Philippines. The city government vacated it in May, and by June, the UP College in Iloilo officially opened. With no permanent home, city offices temporarily moved to Rizal Elementary School in Tanza before relocating to the former residence of Spanish consul Fernando Reguera at Blumentritt and de la Rama streets. By 1948, the city hall finally settled in the Javellana Building fronting Plaza Libertad, where it remained for decades. In the same year, a 7.8-magnitude earthquake struck Panay, which was the second strongest on record in the country and caused widespread damage in Iloilo City, with total losses estimated at ₱1,000,000.

Despite the initial push toward recovery, Iloilo continued to face significant challenges in the post-war years. The decline of the sugar industry, the backbone of the city's prewar economy, sharply reduced local revenues. Labor unrest in the port area, rising criminality in the countryside, and political instability added further strain. Then, in 1966, a massive fire swept across the downtown district and destroyed nearly three-quarters of the commercial center, pushing the already fragile city deeper into economic stagnation. As opportunities dwindled, many Ilonggos migrated to Bacolod, Cebu, Manila, and abroad in search of better prospects. This exodus drained Iloilo of both investors and skilled workers, weakening its position as a major economic hub. It was also during this time that Iloilo slowly lost its status as the second most important city in the Philippines to Cebu.

Recovery came slowly and gradually. The construction of a modern fishing port and later a new international seaport marked the first major steps toward revitalization. These new facilities attracted commercial firms and opened the door for renewed trade and investment. One by one, businesses returned, stimulating commercial activity and setting Iloilo back on the path toward economic resurgence.

On December 22, 1979, Iloilo City was declared a highly urbanized city through Batas Pambansa Blg. 51. With this status, Iloilo regained political and economic independence from the province, although residents consequently lost the right to vote for provincial officials.

=== Marcos dictatorship ===
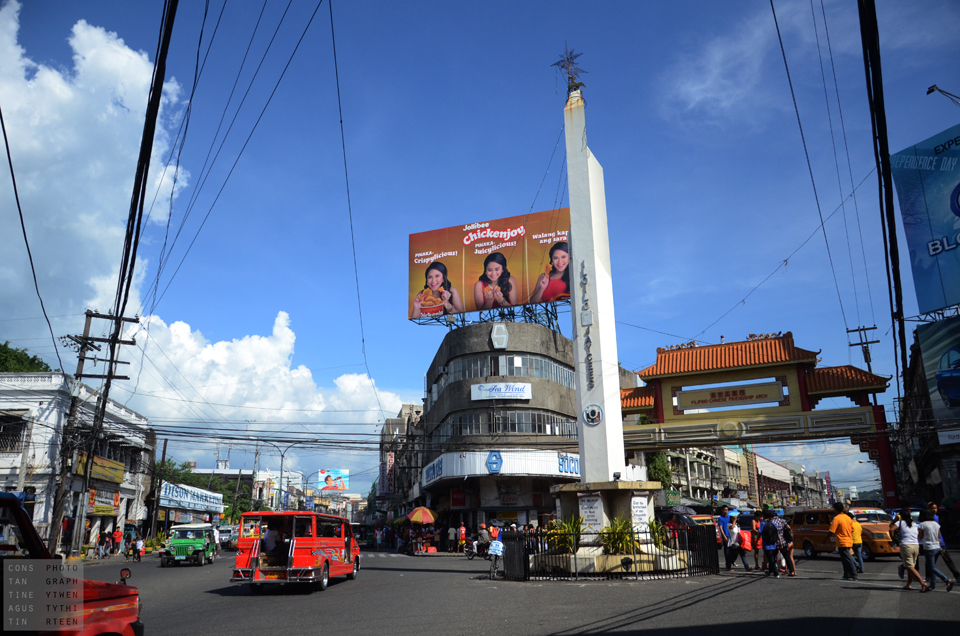
Plazoleta Gáy, where people in Iloilo gathered for the 1986 People Power Revolution

The closing months of 1969 marked the beginning of a turbulent era in the Philippines. Ferdinand Marcos' debt-funded infrastructure spree, intended to secure his re-election, triggered a severe balance of payments crisis immediately after the November polls. By his second inauguration on December 30, 1969, the peso was collapsing and inflation was spiraling, fueling a wave of unrest now remembered as the First Quarter Storm. While Manila became the center of massive protests, Iloilo City experienced its own parallel surge of activism.

In Iloilo, students from Central Philippine University (CPU) and the Western Institute of Technology (WIT) emerged as key organizers of local protests. They banded together as the Federation of Ilonggo Students (FIST), led by figures such as Vic Beloria, Renato Ganchero, Virgil Ortigas, and brothers Napoleon and Rolando Lorca. Their activism placed them at the forefront of the growing anti-dictatorship movement. Many would later be forced into hiding after the declaration of martial law—and several, including some FIST leaders, were killed resisting the regime. Their names now stand on the Bantayog ng mga Bayani, honored for their sacrifice. Among them was also Edmundo Legislador of UP Iloilo, another young Ilonggo whose activism cost him his life.

Marcos' declaration of martial law in 1972 marked the start of a 14-year authoritarian rule defined by censorship, militarization, and widespread human rights violations. Documentation by Amnesty International, Task Force Detainees of the Philippines, and other monitoring groups estimates that the regime was responsible for 3,257 extrajudicial killings, 35,000 cases of torture, and 70,000 incarcerations. Iloilo was not spared from this repression. Camp Delgado became one of the key detention centers for political prisoners in the Visayas.

Notable Ilonggos were imprisoned there, including labor lawyer Rodolfo Lagoc, who was detained without charges for six months, and Coronacion "Waling-waling" Chiva, the famed World War II heroine. Chiva's legendary status offered her some measure of protection, but many others were not as fortunate. Activists like Luing Posa-Dominado and Judy Taguiwalo suffered torture, sexual assault, and severe abuse while in detention. For their courage, Lagoc, Chiva, and Posa-Dominado were later memorialized at the Bantayog ng mga Bayani. Taguiwalo survived and continued her public service, eventually serving as Secretary of Social Welfare and Development decades later.

== Contemporary era (1986–present) ==
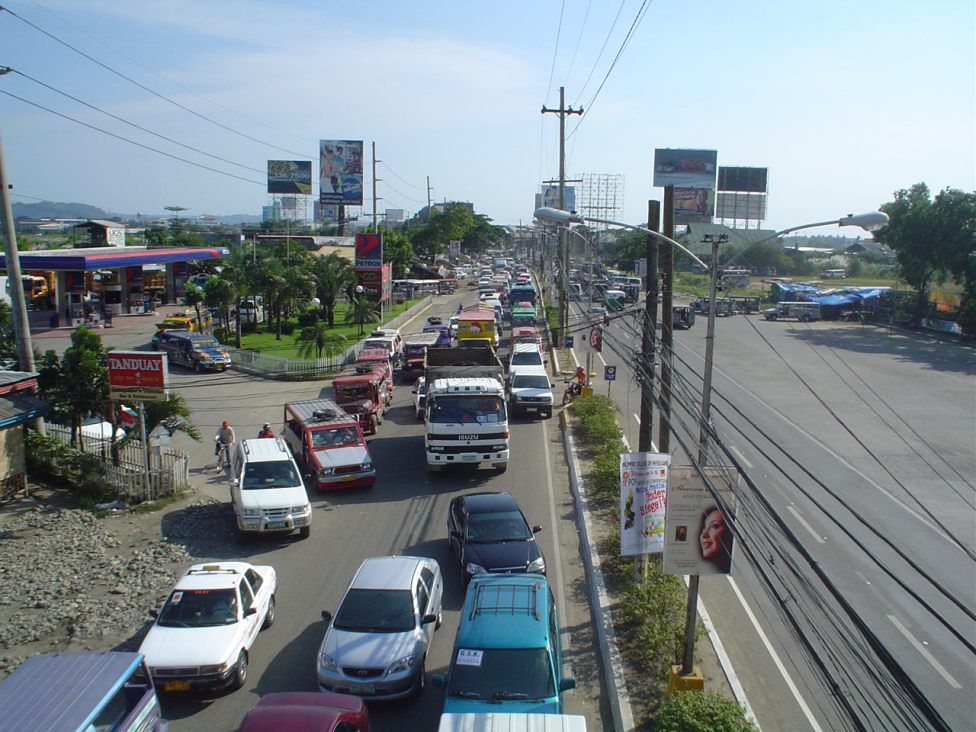
Traffic congestion on Diversion Road in the 2000s

By the late 1980s, as urbanization and economic activity in Iloilo City and its neighboring towns increased, business leaders and local officials began discussions on forming a metropolitan alliance to coordinate regional development. In 2001, the Metropolitan Iloilo Development Council (MIDC) was created, bringing together Iloilo City and the municipalities of Leganes, Oton, Pavia, and San Miguel. In 2006, a larger metropolitan body, the Metro Iloilo–Guimaras Economic Development Council (MIGEDC), was formed to include the municipalities of Santa Barbara and Cabatuan, as well as the island province of Guimaras. MIGEDC subsequently became the governing body of the Metro Iloilo–Guimaras area.

In 2007, the Iloilo International Airport in Cabatuan opened, replacing the old Mandurriao Airport. The vacated old airport property was later acquired by Megaworld Corporation and developed into the Iloilo Business Park, which became the city's new central business district. The surrounding area, once dominated by fishponds and salt beds, also underwent significant urban redevelopment, including the establishment of Atria Park District, SM City Iloilo complex, and Smallville Business Complex.

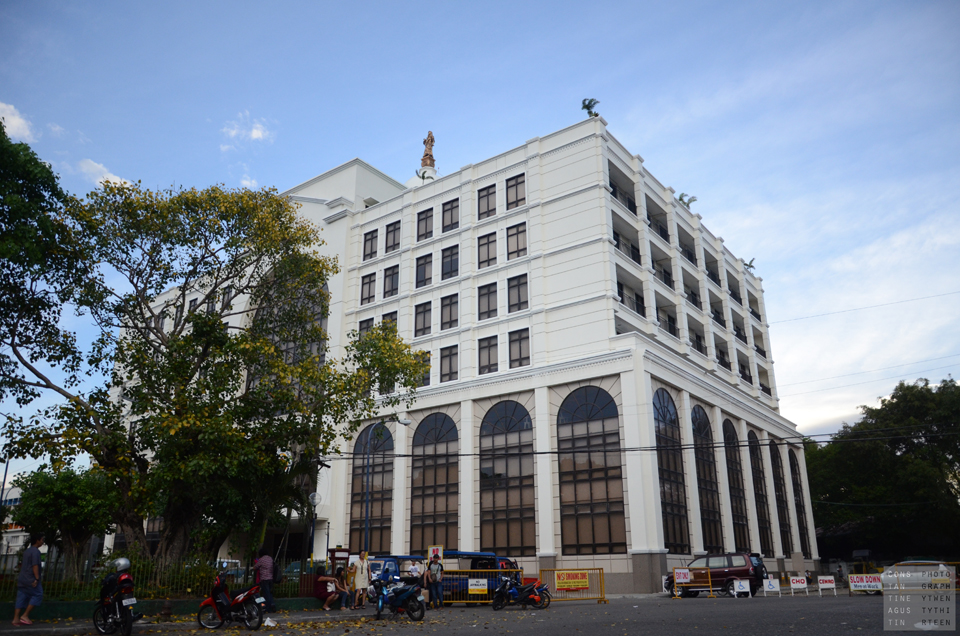
The new Iloilo City Hall at the Plaza Libertad

In 2008, Lapuz was officially separated from La Paz and became Iloilo City's seventh district. In 2011, the new Iloilo City Hall at Plaza Libertad was completed, after years of having no permanent location. The Jaro Floodway, a major component of the Iloilo Flood Control Project, was also finished in the same year to address the city's recurring flooding problems, particularly after the severe flooding brought by Typhoon Frank in 2008, considered the worst flood in the city's history. In 2012, the Iloilo River Esplanade opened as part of the Iloilo River Rehabilitation Project, which restored the Iloilo River after years of pollution and informal settlements. The esplanade later became a major tourist attraction in the city.

In 2016, Mayor Jed Patrick Mabilog was publicly accused by President Rodrigo Duterte of being a "major drug protector," and Iloilo City was labeled as the most "shabulized" city in the Philippines. The claims were strongly challenged by local officials and residents, who argued that the accusations were unfair and harmful to the city's reputation, with many suggesting Duterte was misinformed or politically motivated. Law enforcement agencies, including the Philippine National Police (PNP) and the Philippine Drug Enforcement Agency (PDEA), also stated that their records did not support the assertion that Iloilo was the most affected by the illegal drug trade compared to other cities. Following the accusations and reported threats, Mabilog went on leave and later left the country in 2017, resulting in the vacancy of the mayoralty. Vice Mayor Jose Espinosa III subsequently assumed office as mayor in accordance with the city's succession rules.

In 2019, Iloilo City's power distribution sector experienced a major shift when the long-time distributor, Panay Electric Company (PECO), was challenged by MORE Electric and Power Corporation (MORE Power) over issues related to outdated infrastructure and service quality. On February 14, MORE Power was granted a 25-year distribution franchise following the expiration of PECO's franchise on January 18. MORE Power began operations on February 28, 2020, marking the end of PECO's 97-year operation in the city. The transition was generally welcomed by residents, local officials, and consumer groups.

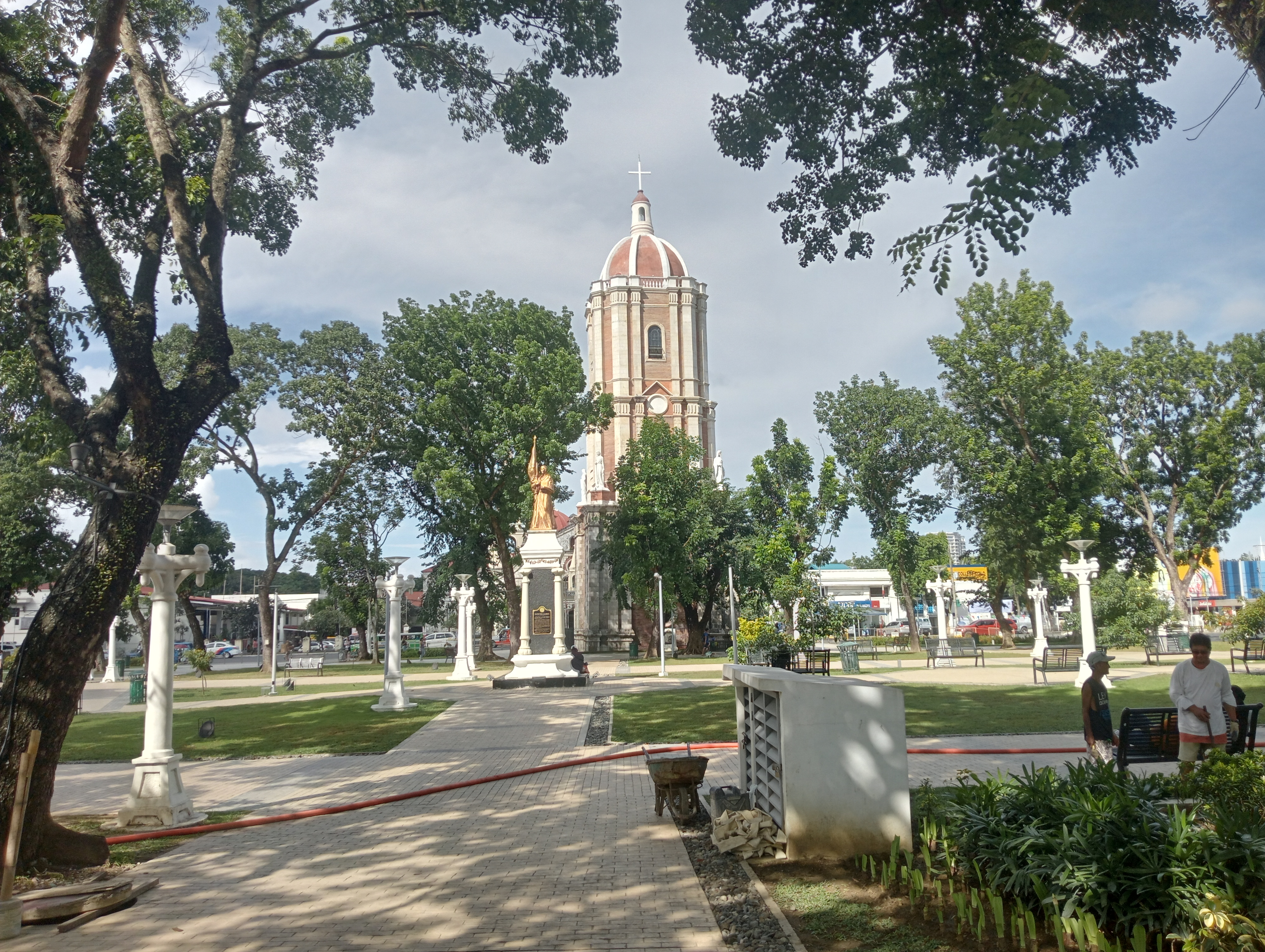
Rehabilitated Jaro Plaza with the Jaro Belfry in the background

From 2021 to 2023, Iloilo City underwent rehabilitation and beautification of its public plazas, including Jaro Plaza, Plaza Libertad, La Paz Plaza, Mandurriao Plaza, Arevalo Plaza, and Molo Plaza. The Jaro Belfry was also restored. District public markets, such as La Paz Public Market, Jaro Public Market, Arevalo Public Market, and Mandurriao Public Market, were renovated, while the Iloilo Central Market and Iloilo Terminal Market were redeveloped into market malls through public-private partnerships with SM Prime Holdings.

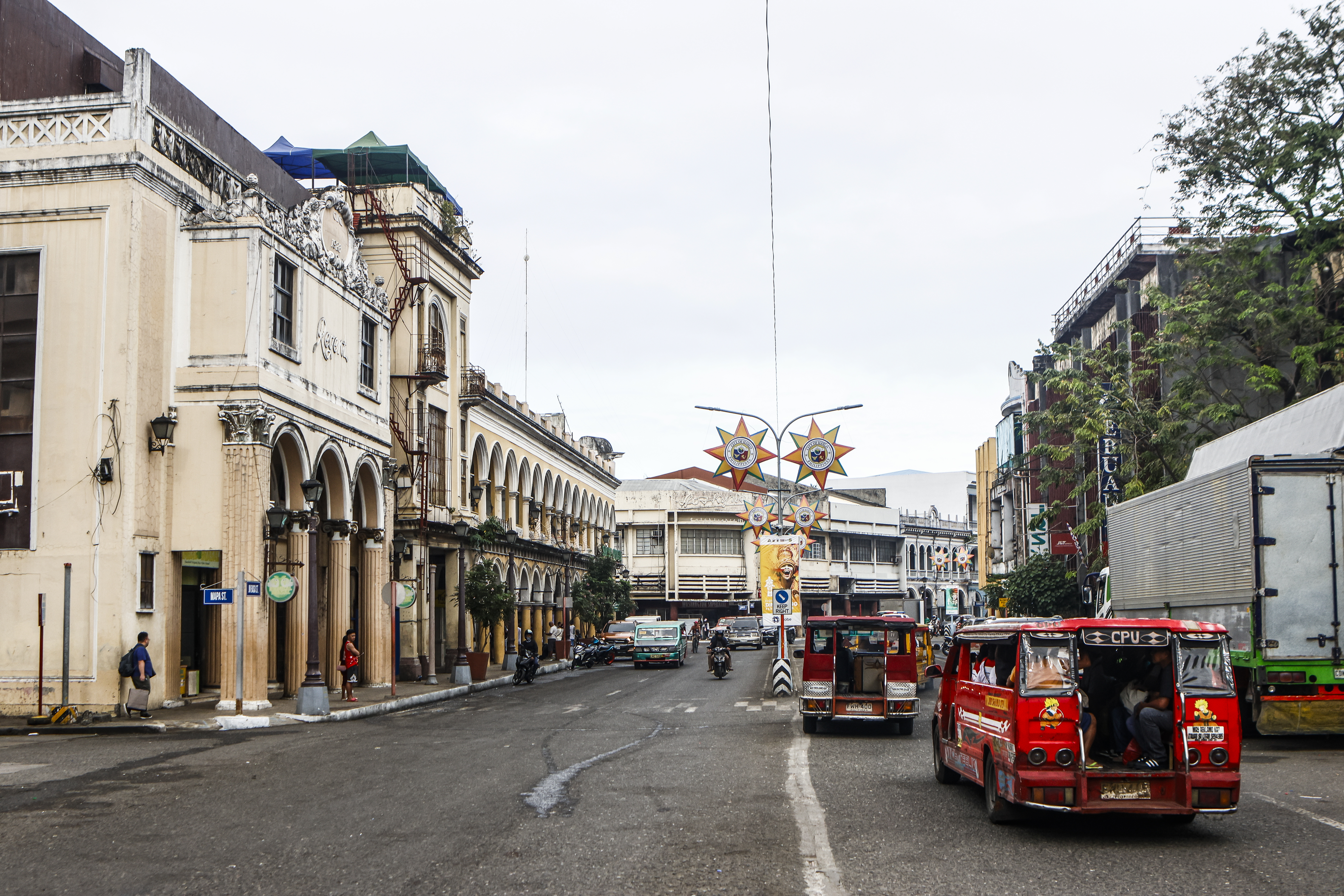
Calle Real in downtown Iloilo City, after the removal of spaghetti wires

In 2023, Iloilo City was recognized as a City of Gastronomy by the UNESCO Creative Cities Network, acknowledging its rich culinary heritage and popular dishes such as La Paz batchoy, pancit molo, kadyos-baboy-langka (KBL), laswa, and kansi. On May 8, 2024, the Hinilawod Epic Chant recordings of Central Philippine University (CPU) were inscribed in the UNESCO's Memory of the World Register, marking the city's second UNESCO distinction. The Calle Real Heritage Zone was also included in the UNESCO World Heritage Sites Tentative List as part of "The Sugar Cultural Landscape of Negros and Panay Islands." The underground cabling along Calle Real was completed in early 2025, clearing the historic street of overhead spaghetti wires.

In 2024, the Iloilo Commercial Port Complex was placed under the management of International Container Terminal Services, Inc. (ICTSI) and renamed the Visayas Container Terminal. The facility became one of the most modern ports in the Philippines, enhancing international connectivity and supporting trade and economic growth in the central Philippines. In the same year, Iloilo City was recognized as the second fastest-growing economy among all highly urbanized cities in the country. In 2026, the city received its second ASEAN Clean Tourist City Award during the ASEAN Tourism Forum 2026 and was named one of the inaugural "20 Cities Towards Zero Waste" by the United Nations Secretary-General's Advisory Board on Zero Waste.

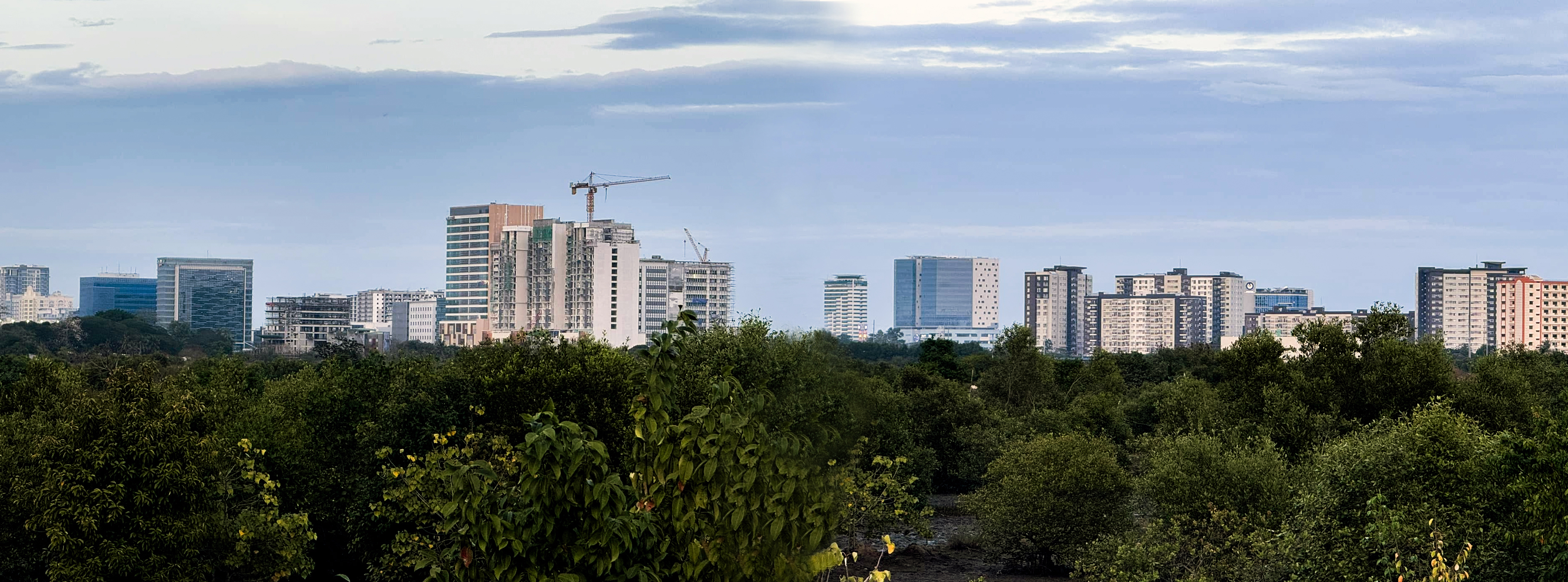
Skyline of Mandurriao, Iloilo City as of 2025, as seen from Sunset Boulevard

== See also ==
- Madja-as
