= IFCP (disambiguation) =

IFCP is the Internet Fibre Channel Protocol.

IFCP may also refer to:

- Institute for Cancer Prevention, a U.S.-government-supported cancer center
- Iloilo Flood Control Project, a project of the Department of Public Works and Highways in Iloilo City, Philippines
- Impenetrable Forest Conservation Project, the forerunner to Institute of Tropical Forest Conservation in Uganda
