= Marvin Traub =

American businessman

- Born: May 14, 1925; New York City, U.S.
- Died: July 11, 2012 (aged 87); Manhattan, New York City, U.S.
- Occupations: businessman, writer
- Known for: CEO and President of Bloomingdale's

Marvin Traub (May 14, 1925 – July 11, 2012) was an American businessman and writer. He was a prominent business executive in the retail sector known for his impact on merchandising and marketing. Traub was CEO and President of Bloomingdale's for twenty-two years leaving in 1992 to found his own consulting firm, Marvin Traub Associates. Between 1994 and 2000, Marvin Traub Associates participated in a joint venture with retail-focused investment banking firm, Financo, Inc.

Traub is the author of two books. In 1993, Traub wrote Like No Other Store...:: The Bloomingdale's Legend and the Revolution in American Marketing about his tenure at Bloomingdale's. In 2008, he wrote Marvin Traub: Like No Other Career, a coffee table book that also profiles his works since leaving Bloomingdale's.

== Biography ==
=== Early life and education ===
Marvin Traub was born to a Jewish family on April 14, 1925 in New York City. Traub's father Sam D. was an executive of a corset company and his mother Bea (née Bruckman), a saleswoman at Bonwit Teller. As a teenager Traub was a neighbor and friend of Stanley Kubrick, sharing an interest in photography. Traub graduated from Harvard University in 1947, although his studies were interrupted by service in Europe during World War II. He then attended Harvard Business School, from which he graduated in 1949.

=== Career ===
In 1978, Traub was named CEO of U.S. based retailer, Bloomingdale's, where he remained through 1992. After leaving Bloomingdales in 1992, Traub founded his own consulting firm, Marvin Traub Associates. Between 1994 and 2000, Marvin Traub Associates participated in a joint venture with retail-focused investment banking firm, Financo, Inc.

=== Other affiliations and awards ===
Traub was a Trustee of the American Health Foundation (AHF) between August 1975 and February 1978. He was the President of Bloomingdale's from 1978 to 1992, and Vice Chairman of Federated Department Stores from 1988 to 1992. He served on the Visiting Committee of the Harvard School of Public Health. Traub was also the Chairman of SD Retail Consulting, which is a unit of The Hilco Organization.

Traub was the recipient of The Gold Medal of the National Retail Federation in 1991 as well as the Légion d’Honneur and Ordre national du Mérite from France and was awarded the Commendatore de la Republic by Italy.

=== Personal life ===
While at Harvard, he married Lee Laufer on September 2, 1948. Traub's wife had studied dance under Martha Graham in 1942 and is the chair emerita of the Martha Graham Center of Contemporary Dance.

Traub had three children; Andrew (formerly an executive at Macy's), James (a journalist) and Margaret (who founded and runs the lighting company Adesso).

=== Death ===
Traub died from bladder cancer at his home in Manhattan on July 11, 2012 at the age of 87.
