= Ernst Wynder =

American epidemiologist

Ernst Ludwig Wynder
- Born: April 30, 1922; Herford, Westphalia
- Died: July 14, 1999 (aged 77); Manhattan, New York, US
- Education: New York University; Washington University School of Medicine
- Occupations: Physician, educator, health researcher
- Known for: Linking smoking with lung cancer
- Awards: Robert Koch Prize (Gold, 1990)

Ernst Ludwig Wynder (April 30, 1922 – July 14, 1999) was an American epidemiology and public health researcher who studied the health effects of smoking tobacco. His and Evarts Ambrose Graham's joint publication of "Tobacco Smoking as a Possible Etiologic Factor in Bronchiogenic Carcinoma: A Study of 684 Proved Cases" appeared in the Journal of the American Medical Association. It was one of the first major scientific publications to identify smoking as a contributory cause of lung cancer.

== Biography ==
Wynder was born in Herford, Westphalia in 1922 to Jewish parents (a cousin of Robert Weinberg). In 1938 his family escaped Nazi rule and fled to the United States, where Wynder enrolled at New York University. During World War II, he attained citizenship and joined the U.S. Army, where, as a German-speaker, he was assigned to a psychological warfare unit to monitor German newscasts. After the war, he attended medical school at Washington University in St. Louis. In 1950, he received both a Bachelor of Science and a medical degree. Aside from his credentials as a physician, Wynder was a researcher, educator, and activist. He devoted his career to the study and prevention of cancer and chronic disease, publishing hundreds of scientific papers. Through the 1950s and 1960s, he worked at Sloan-Kettering Institute for Cancer Research. In 1969, he founded the American Health Foundation. In 1972, he founded the academic journal Preventive Medicine and served as the founding editor. Wynder died from thyroid cancer on July 14, 1999.

== Scholarship ==
=== Smoking and Lung Cancer Studies ===
Wynder began collaborating with his coauthor on the article, Evarts Ambrose Graham, as a medical student at Washington University in St. Louis in 1947. The previous summer he had conducted epidemiological studies of smoking behavior among 146 lung cancer patients in New York City. The project was funded by the American Cancer Society. Now, with Graham, Wynder collected extensive data on 604 patients with lung cancer at hospitals across the United States. Departing from a tradition of using anecdotal evidence (e.g., clinical interviews) to develop explanations of disease causation, Wynder and Graham applied rudimentary statistical methods to their study. They divided patients into crude categories of "moderate" or "heavy" smokers, based on retrospective interviews of each patient's smoking behavior over a twenty-year period. They also measured and controlled for important confounding factors (e.g., age, types of tobacco use, inhalation level). Most importantly, with regard to an ability to demonstrate causation, Wynder and Graham also studied a control group of cancer-free individuals in hospitals. They systematically compared the lung cancer patients to the control group.

On May 27, 1950 the Journal of the American Medical Association published the resulting scientific report. Incidence among men and women matched patterns of smoking behavior in men and women: "the enormous increase in the sale of cigarettes in this country approximately parallels the increase in [lung cancer]." As further scientific evidence of smoking's role in causing lung cancer began to accumulate in the United States and Great Britain, Wynder and Graham investigated the biological plausibility of the association between smoking and lung disease. In 1950, they initiated a study of the impact of cigarette tar condensate from tobacco smoke on the skin of mice. After a year of exposure to tar, 44 percent of the mice developed cancers. Wynder also discovered specific carcinogens in tar (e.g., benzopyrenes, arsenic), but was unable to identify the contributions of these chemicals to cancer.

Wynder's studies of tobacco smoke were timely and important. Whereas laboratory studies of tobacco tar had been conducted elsewhere, Wynder's findings supported the growing epidemiological data. "The production of tumors in lab animals offered a powerful indicator that something in cigarette smoke could account for the epidemiological findings," writes Allan M. Brandt, a historian of medicine.

=== Other Research ===
Wynder published nearly 800 papers during his lifetime. Wynder's work appeared in 139 periodicals and one book. More than half of his articles were published in ten prestigious mainline journals, such as Cancer, the flagship journal of the American Cancer Society. The dominant themes were lung and breast cancer, but there were also in-depth studies of the epidemiology of cancer of the bladder, larynx, colon and rectum, stomach, ovary, prostate, pancreas, and kidney, as well as numerous experimental studies. Many of these papers were the first or most comprehensive studies ever published, especially the massive 1960 coauthored study of the epidemiology of breast cancer.

== See also ==
- Tobacco
- Cigarette
- Lung cancer
- Evarts Ambrose Graham
