= Helen Graham =

Helen Graham may refer to:

== People ==
- Helen Graham (bowls), Zambian lawn bowler
- Helen Graham (historian), English historian
- Helen Tredway Graham (1890–1971), American pharmacologist
- Helen Matthews, Scottish footballer

== Fictional characters ==
- Helen Graham (EastEnders)
- Helen Graham (The Tenant of Wildfell Hall)
- Helen Graham, in Peril at End House

== Other ==
- Helen F. Graham Cancer Center, Stanton, Delaware
