= Warren Henry Cole =

American surgeon

Warren Henry Cole (24 July 1898 – 25 May 1990) was an American surgeon, a pioneer in the field of adjunctive treatments for surgical cancer patients. With Evarts Ambrose Graham, he co-developed in the process of visualizing the gall bladder with X-rays by using contrast media, a process used in the diagnosis of gall bladder disease, in 1924.

Born in Clay Center, Kansas in 1898 Cole received his M.D. from Washington University School of Medicine, and served on the faculty for several years. Cole left Washington University in St. Louis in 1936 to serve as a professor at University of Illinois Chicago, a position he held for 30 years. He served as a president of the American Cancer Society from 1959–1960.
