= Preventive Medicine (journal) =

- Discipline: Preventive medicine, public health
- Language: English
- Edited by: Luisa N. Borrell

Publication details
- History: 1972–present
- Publisher: Elsevier
- Frequency: Monthly
- Impact factor: 3.2 (2025)

Standard abbreviations
- ISO 4: Prev. Med.

Indexing
- CODEN: PVTMA3
- ISSN: 0091-7435 (print); 1096-0260 (web)
- LCCN: 72624344
- OCLC no.: 01605081

Links
- Journal homepage; Online access

Preventive Medicine is a peer-reviewed medical journal published by Elsevier since 1972. It covers all aspects of preventive medicine and public health. The editor-in-chief is Luisa N. Borrell (City University of New York). The founding editor was Ernst Wynder.

== Abstracting and indexing ==
The journal is abstracted and indexed in EMBASE, Scopus, Science Citation Index, Current Contents/Clinical Medicine, BIOSIS Previews, and Index Medicus/MEDLINE/PubMed. Its 2014 impact factor was 3.086, ranking it 25th among 153 journals in the category "General and Internal Medicine" and 31st among 162 journals in the category "Public, Environmental, and Occupational Health".
