= Evarts Ambrose Graham =

American surgeon (1883–1957)

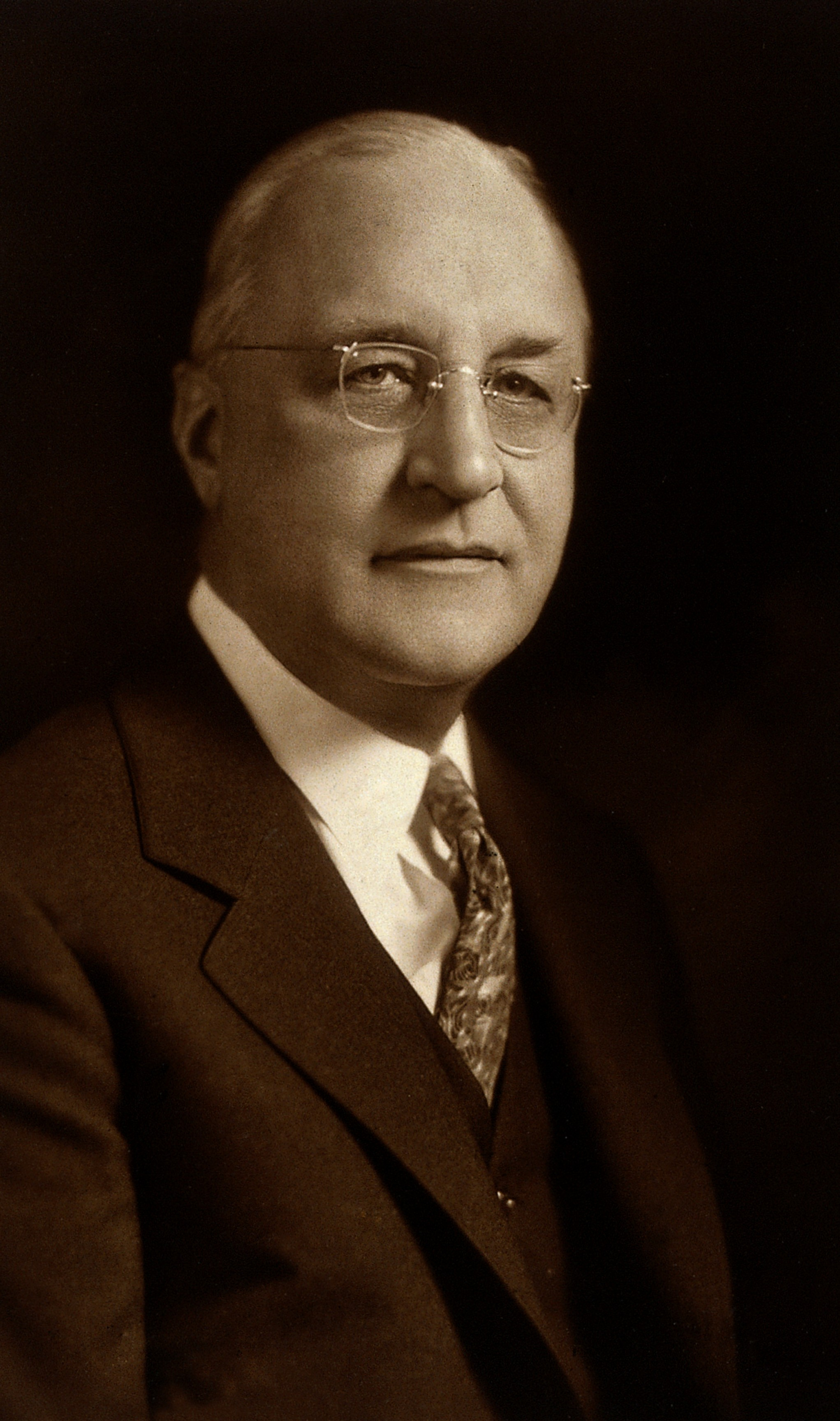
- Born: March 19, 1883; Chicago, Illinois, US
- Died: March 4, 1957 (aged 73); St. Louis, Missouri, US
- Education: Princeton University; Rush Medical College
- Employer: Washington University School of Medicine
- Known for: Research in surgery and radiology; first surgeon to perform a successful pneumonectomy for lung cancer
- Spouse: Helen Tredway
- Children: 2
- Awards: Lister Medal (1942)

Evarts Ambrose Graham (March 19, 1883 – March 4, 1957) was an American academic, physician, and surgeon.

== Early years and military service ==
Born in Chicago, Illinois to a surgeon, David Wilson Graham, and Ida Ansbach Barned Graham, Evarts attended college at Princeton University (A.B., 1904) and received his M.D. degree from Rush Medical College in 1907. Graham then trained as a surgery resident at Presbyterian Hospital in Chicago, and subsequently as a graduate student in chemistry at the University of Chicago. There, he met his wife, Helen Tredway, Ph.D. (1890-1971), a biochemist and pharmacologist. Evarts served as a Major (O4) in the U.S. Army Medical Corps from 1917 to 1919, and was initially posted to Camp Lee (now Fort Lee, Virginia). He completed revolutionary new work on surgical technique for the treatment of empyema, which had become important following the influenza pandemic of 1918. Afterwards, Graham served in France as commander of U.S. Army Evacuation Hospital 34.

== Career at Washington University ==
Following his discharge from military service, he was recruited to Washington University in St. Louis, MO as the Bixby Professor of Surgery. An expert thoracic surgeon, he was best known for collaborating with Jacob J. Singer, Kenneth Bell, and William Adams on the first successful removal of a lung for the treatment of bronchogenic carcinoma in 1933. The patient was another physician (an obstetrician-gynecologist from Pittsburgh, Pennsylvania), James Lee Gilmore. In 1924, together with fellow surgeon Warren Henry Cole, Graham developed the technique of cholecystography, the first procedure for imaging the gallbladder and detecting the presence of cholelithiasis. Graham was instrumental in founding the American Board of Surgery in 1937 and he was active as a medical editor and author. Graham was Editor-in-Chief of the Yearbook of Surgery & the Journal of Thoracic Surgery, and Co-Editor-in-Chief of Annals of Surgery.

Graham served as the chairman of the department of surgery at Washington University School of Medicine (WUSM) from 1919 to 1951, and the chief of surgery at Barnes Hospital, the teaching medical center of WUSM now known as Barnes-Jewish Hospital. Graham and Ernst Wynder conducted the first systematic research on the carcinogenic effects of cigarette smoking that was done on a large scale, and they published their results in a 1950 paper in the Journal of the American Medical Association (JAMA).

== Illness and death ==
Graham himself had been a long-time cigarette smoker until his own research, known as the 1950 Wynder and Graham Study, supported a link between smoking and disease, and he ironically died from lung cancer in 1957. He was survived by his wife and two sons—Evarts A. Graham Jr. (1921–1996), an editor, and David Tredway Graham (1918–1999), an internist. Evarts Graham's seminal lung cancer surgery patient in 1933, Gilmore, also outlived him by six years, dying in 1963 at the age of 78.

== Honors and awards ==
In 1941, Graham was elected to the American Philosophical Society. That same year, he was elected to the United States National Academy of Sciences. He was awarded the Lister Medal in 1942 for his contributions to surgical science. The corresponding Lister Oration, given at the Royal College of Surgeons of England, was not delivered until 1947, and was titled 'Some Aspects of Bronchogenic Carcinoma'. His other awards included the gold medal of the Radiological Society of North America; the Leonard Research Prize of the American Roentgen Ray Society; the gold medal of the St. Louis Medical Society; the gold medal of the Southern Medical Society; and presidency of the International Congress of Surgeons in 1953-1954. Graham received honorary doctorates from the University of Cincinnati, Princeton University, Western Reserve University, the University of Pennsylvania, and the University of Chicago. Named lectureships included the Harvey, Mutter, McArthur, Shattuck, Alvarez, Joyce, Arthur Dean Bevan, Caldwell, Balfour, and Judd Lectures.
