= James Traub =

American journalist

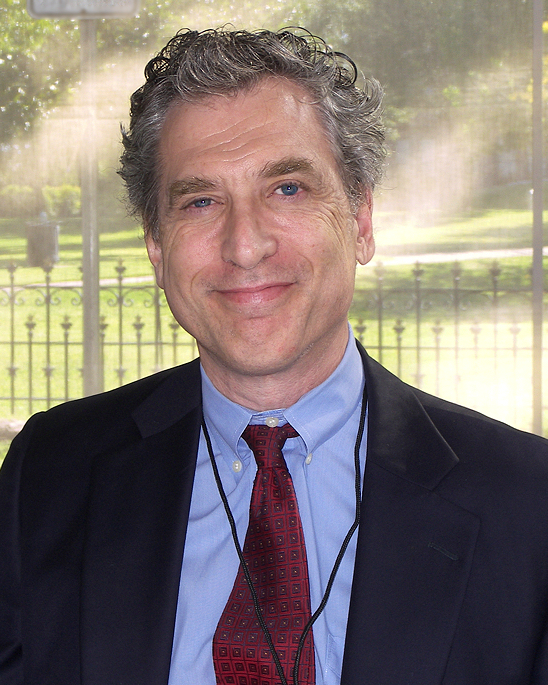
- Traub at the 2008 Texas Book Festival
- Born: 1954 (age 71–72)
- Education: Harvard University
- Occupation: Journalist

James Traub (born 1954) is an American journalist. He is a contributing writer for The New York Times Magazine, where he has worked since 1998. From 1994 to 1997, he was a staff writer for The New Yorker. He has also written for The New York Review of Books, The Atlantic Monthly, National Review, Spy, and Foreign Affairs. He is a senior fellow at the Center on International Cooperation at New York University and also teaches at the university.

As a freelance journalist, he has written many book reviews and other articles for the New York Times. His recent writing focuses on politics and international affairs, including profiles of Barack Obama, Al Gore and John McCain. He also wrote a book on Kofi Annan and the United Nations.

New York City is the subject or background of several of his books. His 1990 book Too Good to Be True was about the rise and fall of Wedtech, a small Bronx manufacturing company that used no-bid contracts, fraud and corruption to win defense contracts during the Reagan administration. His 2004 book The Devil's Playground was about the history of Times Square, including its decline as a center of adult businesses in the 1990s to its redevelopment under Mayor Rudy Giuliani, who was also the subject of several feature articles he wrote for the New York Times Magazine.

He has written extensively on education issues, including his 1994 book City On A Hill, a profile of City College of New York, written after he spent 18 months on campus. He wrote a study of school reform called Better By Design for the Thomas B. Fordham Foundation that profiled ten approaches to school reform. He has also written articles about the No Child Left Behind Act and school choice.

He taught at the Maulana Azad College in Aurangabad, India. He was also a reporter for the New York Post and a senior editor of the Saturday Review.

== Family ==
He is the son of Marvin Traub, formerly chairman of Bloomingdale's, and Lee L. Traub, chair emerita of the Martha Graham Center of Contemporary Dance. He is married to Elizabeth Easton, formerly the chair of the Department of European Painting and Sculpture at the Brooklyn Museum and an adjunct professor at New York University. He is a magna cum laude graduate of Harvard University.

== Books ==
- Too Good to Be True: The Outlandish Story of Wedtech, Doubleday, 1990 — ISBN 978-0-385-26182-1
- City On A Hill: Testing the American Dream at City College, Addison Wesley Publishing, 1994 — ISBN 978-0-201-62227-0
- The Devil's Playground: A Century of Pleasure and Profit in Times Square, Random House, 2004 — ISBN 978-0-375-50788-5
- The Best Intentions: Kofi Annan and the UN in the Era of American World Power, Farrar, Straus and Giroux, 2006 — ISBN 978-0-374-18220-5
- The Freedom Agenda: Why America Must Spread Democracy (Just Not the Way George Bush Did), Farrar, Straus and Giroux, 2008 — ISBN 978-0-374-15847-7
- John Quincy Adams: Militant Spirit, Basic Books, 2016 — ISBN 978-0-465-02827-6
- What Was Liberalism?: The Past, Present, and Promise of a Noble Idea, Basic Books, 2019 — ISBN 9781541616844
- Judah Benjamin: Counselor to the Confederacy, Yale University Press, 2021 — ISBN 9780300229264
- True Believer: Hubert Humphrey's Quest for a More Just America, Basic Books, 2024 — ISBN 9781541619579
- The Cradle of Citizenship: How Schools Can Help Save Our Democracy, W. W. Norton & Company, 2026 — ISBN 9781324079514
