= 1950 Wynder and Graham Study =

Research connecting smoking with lung cancer

The 1950 Wynder and Graham Study was conducted by Ernest Wynder and Evarts Graham and was entitled "Tobacco Smoking as a Possible Etiologic Factor in Bronchiogenic Carcinoma: A Study of Six Hundred and Eighty-Four [684] Proved Cases". It was published on May 27, 1950. It was a case-control study to determine the relationship between various external factors and the development of bronchogenic carcinoma. The study concluded that long-term tobacco usage contributes to the onset of lung cancer, as an overwhelming majority (96.5%) of the men with the disease were classified as moderate to heavy smokers for an extended period of time, compared to a lower percentage of the general hospital population control group.

== Context ==
Studies conducted before smoking and lung cancer were scientifically related connected a higher rate of smoking to lung cancer incidence, and eventually mortality 20 years later. In 1775, Percivall Pott’s discovery of the high incidence of scrotal cancer in chimney sweeps demonstrated that charred organic substances were carcinogenic. Wynder used Pott’s research as a foundation for his argument that his hypothesis that smoking leads to the development of lung cancer was biologically valid. In 1912, Isaac Adler connected the rise in primary lung cancer to consumption of cigarettes because of the different smoking habits of men and women. Men experienced a higher incidence of lung cancer and also smoked much more than women. Other early researchers include: Joseph Bloodgood (1921) who demonstrated a link between tongue cancer and tobacco, founder of the American Cancer Society Frederick Hoffman (1924) who proved excessive smoking caused cancer development in the mouth and lungs, and Morton Lenvin (1950) who analyzed hospital data to show the positive correlation between tobacco and lung cancer (1950).

Despite this growing evidence linking tobacco usage to lung cancer, in 1950 the scientific consensus was that major cause of lung cancer was from industrial and automotive polluters. Richard Doll, a prominent scientist who conducted the British Doctors Study with Austin Bradford Hill in 1951, theorized that smoking was not considered an obvious factor because everyone participated in it, yet not everyone developed lung cancer. Scientists believed many other factors were responsible for the development of lung cancer, such as automobile exhaust, coal fumes, infectious diseases, race, and better diagnostic technologies. Moreover, it was deemed unlikely that a single preventable factor, such as smoking, could alone cause such a complicated outcome like cancer.

In the fifty years leading up to the Wynder and Graham study, lung cancer was observed to have risen dramatically and disproportionately in comparison to other cancers. From the 1920s to 1950, the year of the study's publication, deaths from lung cancer had quadrupled so now it was the leading cancer found in men. This follows the upward trend of smoking that peaked 20 years prior due to its social pervasiveness, global association with glamour and camaraderie, and the heavy influence of the tobacco industry.

Ernst Wynder was a medical student when he came up with the idea to link smoking with cancer when he witnessed the blackened lungs of a man with lung cancer and later learned that he was a heavy smoker. Wynder sought the assistance of Evarts Graham, a thoracic surgeon and head of the surgery department. Although Graham did not believe in the increased risk of lung cancer from smoking, as he smoked excessively, he enabled Wynder to conduct a case-control study by providing subjects with lung cancer to interview. In 1948, Wynder began distributing questionnaires at Bellevue Hospital asking individual habits, such as smoking, and by 1949 he had data from over 200 patients that proved smoking and lung cancer were correlated. When these findings were presented at the American Cancer Society 1949 national meeting, the lack of audience response reflected a dismissal of smoking as a causal factor for lung cancer. The 1950 Wynder and Graham Study was the first large-scale study to investigate link between smoking and cancer. It differed from previous studies because of the size of the test group, and clear, statistically-significant results.

== Purpose ==
The objective of this research was to design a clinical study to assess multiple external factors in the onset of bronchogenic carcinoma, and which activities or predisposed determinants increase risk for lung cancer.

== Study design ==
This study was a retrospective, case-control study that compared smoking habits of 684 individuals with bronchogenic carcinoma to those without the condition. The survey included questions about smoking: starting age, 20 year tobacco consumption, brands used; as well as inquires about exposure to hazardous agents in the workplace, alcohol use, and causes of death for family members. Researchers obtained information through “special interviews” with patients from hospitals across the nation. Since hospital records provided insufficient information for the scope of this study, trained staff interviewed 634 patients, and the remaining subjects were either mailed the survey or had a close contact answer on their behalf. In addition to current smoking habits, surveys asked about patients' smoking habits for the last 20 years due to the hypothesis of delayed emergence of cancer in smokers. Below is a list of the questions on the etiologic survey:

1. Have you ever had a lung diseases? If so, state time, duration and site of disease.
2. Do you or did you ever smoke?
3. At what age did you begin to smoke?
4. At what age did you stop smoking?
5. How much tobacco did you average per day during the past 20 years of your smoking? (Cigarettes . . . Cigars . . . Pipes . . .)
6. Do you inhale the smoke?
7. Do you have a chronic cough which you attribute to your smoking, especially upon first smoking in the morning? If so, for how long?
8. Do you smoke before or after breakfast?
9. Name the brand(s) and dates if any given brand has been smoked exclusively for more than five years.
10. What kind of jobs have you held? Have you been exposed to dust or fumes while working there?
11. Have you ever been exposed to irritative dusts or fumes outside of your job? In particular have you ever used insecticide spray excessively? If so, state time and duration.
12. How much alcohol do you or have you averaged per day? State time and duration in years (Whiskey . . . Beer . . . Wine . . .)
13. Where were you born and where have you lived most of your life? State the approximate time span you have lived in a certain locality. Up to what grade did you attend school?
14. State the cause of death of your parents, and of brothers and sisters if any.
15. Site of lesion, microscopic diagnosis, papanicolaou class, etiological class

(Note: questions above were reproduced from Table 1: "Etiologic Survey" of Wynder and Graham's study)

Subjects were classified into two categories: cases, those with bronchogenic carcinoma, and controls, those without the condition. There were 605 microscopic confirmations of the disease. The "general hospital population" group consisted of 780 men and 552 women without cancer. Furthermore, control studies were added to minimize bias from interviewers, and the compare the incidence of lung cancer with exposure to other factors among the different groups. Control study 1 included 100 men with lung cancer and 186 with other chest diseases, and its interviewers were not affiliated with the hospitals and did not know patients' diagnoses. Control study II involved 83 individuals with lung cancer and involved a similar survey administered by doctors who were not under the oversight of these researchers. Finally, the researchers equated the age distributions of lung cancer and non-cancer groups. The total percentage of patients with cancer in a particular age group was used as a benchmark to adjust the percentages of nonsmokers.

To organize the data, smokers were classified as nonsmokers, light, moderately heavy, heavy, excessive, and chain. Individuals in the study were evaluated based on average daily consumption of cigarettes, age, history of disease, and occupation - the latter two to avoid confounding variables. Researchers wondered if there was a connection between an increased consumption of cigarettes for a longer period of time and a higher prevalence of lung cancer in these individuals, excluding adenocarcinoma.

Group	Classification	Cigarettes per Day
0	Nonsmokers	<1
1	Light smokers	1-9
2	Moderately heavy smokers	10-15
3	Heavy smokers	16-20
4	Excessive smokers	21-34
5	Chain smokers	>35

(Note: table above was reproduced from Table 2: "Classification of Smoking Habits" of Wynder and Graham's study)

The Wynder and Graham study was significant due to the segmentation of risk groups by quantity smoked and the period of tobacco usage. Also, this study sought to reduce confounding variables and selection bias.

== Results and major findings ==
The key finding of the study was that of the men in the study, men with lung cancer were more likely to be long-term smokers than those without the disease. Thus, researchers concluded that smoking is responsible for the onset of bronchogenic carcinoma, but did not establish a causal relationship between smoking cigarettes and developing lung cancer. There was also an evident dose-response relationship: as average daily cigarette consumption increased, so did the number of people with lung cancer as opposed to ones without the disease. Additionally, cigarette usage was shown to contribute to the development of other forms of cancer and heart disease Also, the control studies conducted by "third party" physicians exhibit corresponding results to the data gathered by researchers.

Concerning age distributions, 2.3% with lung cancer were younger than 40 years of age, meanwhile 79.3% were older than 50. In the general hospital population, 14.6% were nonsmokers, but there were only 1.3% nonsmokers within the lung cancer group. Likewise, 54.7% in the general hospital group classify themselves as heavy and chain smokers, whereas 86.4% in the lung cancer group smoke the same amount. Also, when focusing on the excessive smokers subset, there is a 32.1% difference in excessive smokers in the lung cancer group and general hospital group.

Researchers assessed different methods of smoking, such as cigarette, pipe, and cigar. They found that almost all smokers consumed cigarettes, 4% smoked pipes, and 3.5% smoked cigars. When polling for inhalation, they discovered cigarette smoke is inhaled more often than that of cigars or pipes. Also, women smoke a lot less than men, and there was not enough data to link smoking to lung cancer in these cases. Therefore, Wynder conducted separate study on women in 1956.

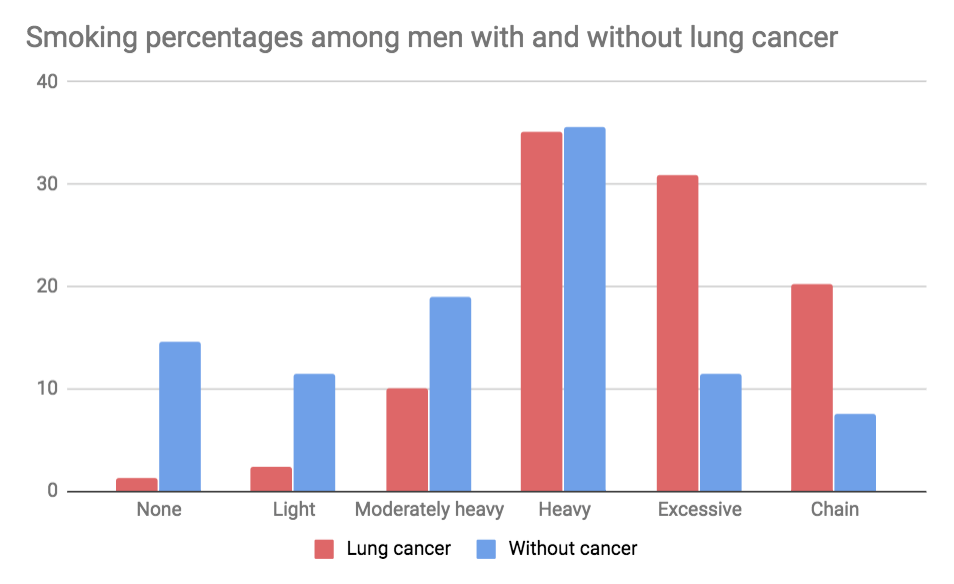

(Note: graph above was reproduced from Figure 3: "Percentages for amount of smoking among 605 male patients with cancer of the lungs and 780 men in the general hospital population without cancer with the same age and economic distribution" of Wynder and Graham's study)

Age Distribution in 605 Cases of Cancer of the Lung in Men
Age Groups	Percentage of Cases
30-39	2.3
40-49	17.4
50-59	42.6
60-69	30.9
70-79	6.8

(Note: table above was reproduced from Table 5: "Age Distribution in 605 Cases of Cancer of the Lung in Men" of Wynder and Graham's study)

== Final conclusions ==
The study concluded that 96.5% of men with bronchogenic carcinoma were heavy to chain smokers, compared to 73.7% of the general population. Statistically, it was rare to find cases of epidermoid or undifferentiated carcinoma in males who haven’t been heavy smokers. Moreover, 96.1% of people with lung cancer smoked for over 20 years, which leads the researchers to hypothesize a 10-year or more lag time between starting smoking and exhibiting the first signs of cancer. Since the overwhelming majority of smokers smoked cigarettes and more cigarette users inhale, this was thought to be a factor in developing lung cancer at a higher rate.

Most importantly, the study proved a dose-dependent relationship. Subjects who developed lung cancer smoked more excessively and for a more prolonged period of time than individuals who did not develop the disease.

== Impact ==
The Wynder and Graham 1950 study was able to conclude that "smoking was an important factor in the production of bronchogenic carcinoma," but smoking wasn't established as a causal factor until four years later, when Wynder published another paper entitled, "Tobacco as a Cause of Lung Cancer" The same year Wynder and Graham published their findings, Doll and Hill conducted their own case-control study that reaffirmed smoking raises the chance of developing lung cancer. Several major studies were published three quarters of a year apart in 1950 that reached the same conclusion: smoking is related to lung cancer.

Public outrage immediately following these papers was underwhelming. In fact, both the scientific and medical sectors cast doubt on the findings, characterizing these study results as controversial. Doll theorized that this state of denial was due to the ubiquity of smoking, and consequently, the public dismissed the dangers of cigarettes since not everyone who smoked developed lung cancer. Additionally, the tobacco industry obscured and distorted these scientific conclusions to dissuade public recognition of the harmful results of smoking, and denied causal link between cigarettes and lung cancer. The tobacco industry appealed to people's desire for freedom and opposition to paternalism. It conveyed the message that the decision to smoke should be left to each individual: in America the government does not have the authority to dictate each person's lifestyle choices.

In 1962, the Surgeon General Luther Terry assembled a task force to review the evidence. Two years later, he released the 1964 Smoking and Health: Report of the Advisory Committee to the Surgeon General of the Public Health Service, which stated that smoking is a definitive causal factor for lung cancer in men and a probable cause in women. As a result, statistics indicate that the public took notice of this health advisory, since smoking decreased by 5% several months following the report. Congressional action followed during the next several years with the Federal Cigarette Labeling and Advertising Act of 1965 and the Public Health Cigarette Smoking Act of 1970. This legislation resulted in health warnings on cigarette boxes, and prevention of broadcast cigarette advertisements. Additionally, in 1983 the federal cigarette tax doubled (the last cigarette tax increase occurred over 30 years earlier to support the Korean War).
