= Helen Tredway Graham =

American pharmacologist and professor (1890–1971)

- Born: July 21, 1890; Dubuque, Iowa, U.S.
- Died: April 4, 1971 (aged 80)
- Occupation: Pharmacologist
- Spouse: Evarts Graham

Helen Tredway Graham (July 21, 1890 – April 4, 1971) was an American pharmacologist known for her research contributions in pharmacology and her active involvement in social causes. She earned her academic degrees from Bryn Mawr College and the University of Chicago before marrying physician Evarts Graham in 1916. Despite societal expectations, Graham pursued a successful career in pharmacology while raising two children. Her research focused on histamine and peripheral nerve cells, yielding several scientific publications. Graham also engaged in social activism, particularly in advocating against air pollution and promoting education.

== Biography ==
=== Early life and education ===
Helen Tredway Graham was born on July 21, 1890, in Dubuque, Iowa, to Harry Ennis Tredway, a merchant, and Marian McConnell. She pursued higher education at Bryn Mawr College, where she graduated with both a B.S. and an M.A. in chemistry. Graham furthered her studies in Germany before obtaining her Ph.D. in chemistry from the University of Chicago in 1915.

=== Career and family life ===
In 1916, Graham married physician Evarts Graham, and the couple had two children. Despite societal expectations at the time, Graham balanced her family responsibilities with a successful career in pharmacology. During World War I, while her husband served overseas, Graham worked as an assistant in pharmacology at Johns Hopkins University. After the war, the couple settled in St. Louis, where Evarts had a position at Washington University in St. Louis.

=== Scientific contributions ===
Graham returned to the laboratory in 1926 as an instructor in the pharmacology department at Washington University School of Medicine. She conducted research alongside Nobel Prize winner Herbert Gasser, focusing on the physiology and pharmacology of peripheral nerve cells. Graham steadily advanced through the academic ranks, becoming an assistant professor in 1931 and an associate professor in 1937. Graham was appointed as a full professor of pharmacy in 1954.

=== Social activism and later life ===
Outside of her scientific pursuits, Graham was involved in various social causes, including participating in the movement against air pollution in St. Louis, helping establish the Junior College District of St. Louis, and serving as a trustee of Bryn Mawr College and the Community School in St. Louis. She also contributed to civic causes, serving as president of the St. Louis League of Women Voters and sitting on the city's board of freeholders.

Following the passing of her husband in 1957 due to lung cancer, Graham continued her contributions to scientific research and social activism. She was promoted to emeritus professor in 1958 but remained active in her scientific pursuits and social causes until her death in 1971.

== Bibliography ==
- Rudavsky, Shari (February 2000). "Graham, Helen Tredway". American National Biography. New York: Oxford University Press. doi:10.1093/anb/9780198606697.article.1201358. (subscription required)
