= Spaghetti wires =

Spaghetti wires are a colloquial term used in the Philippines and parts of Southeast Asia to describe clusters of tangled and overlapping overhead utility cables attached to electric poles.

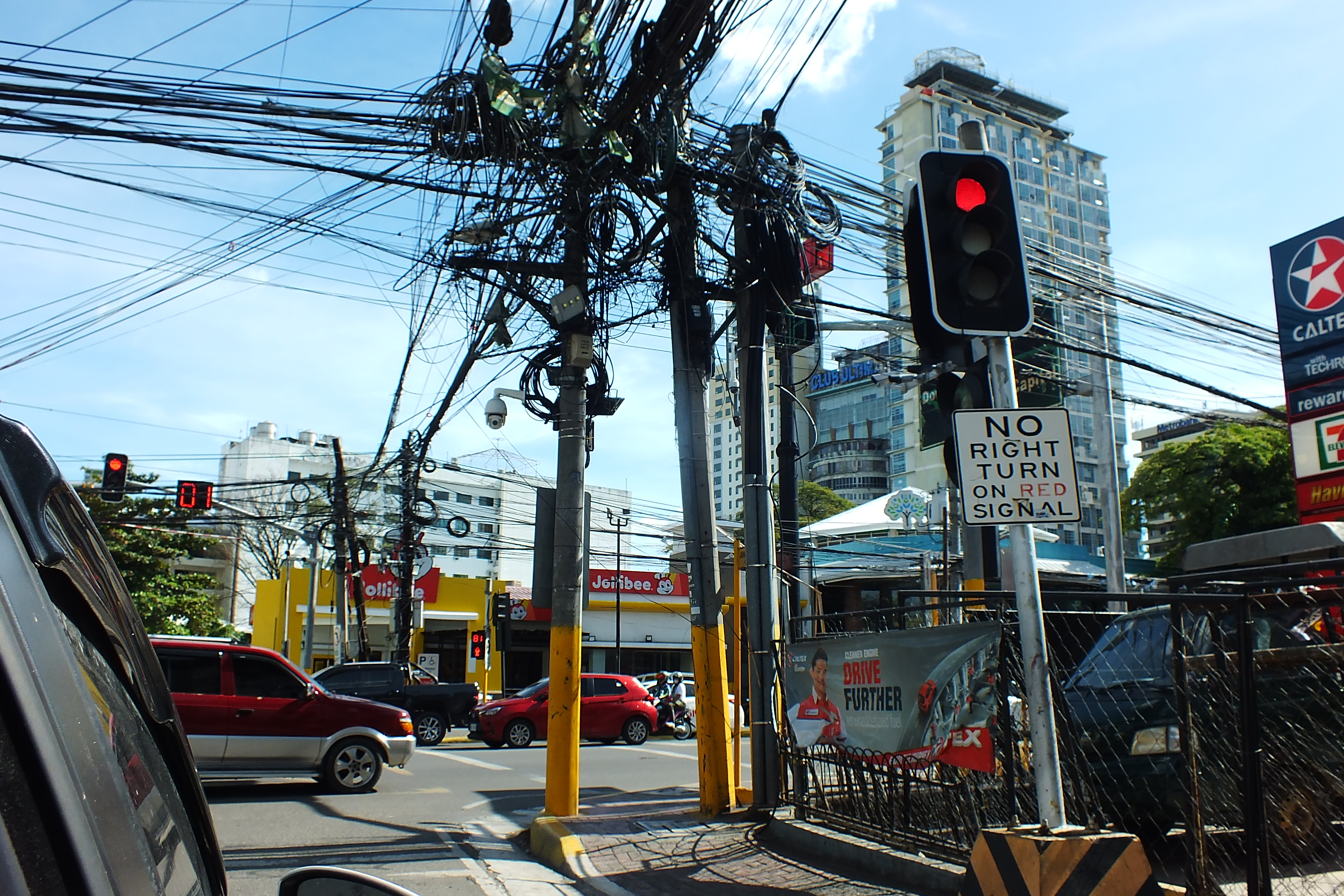
Spaghetti wires on a utility pole along General Maxilom Avenue, Cebu City.

The term refers to the large number of power, telecommunications, and cable television lines that run across streets and buildings. These clusters of cables are commonly seen in crowded urban areas and are often linked to inadequate infrastructure planning, safety concerns, and visual pollution.

== Description ==
Spaghetti wires consist of multiple tite overhead cables installed by different utility providers on shared posts. These include electric distribution lines, fiber-optic cables, internet connections, and cable television wires. Over time, additional lines are attached while unused or outdated cables are left in place, resulting in thick bundles of hanging wires.

A 2024 study published by the Tapa Project found that tangled overhead cables are frequently seen in crowded urban areas where utility installations were carried out without proper planning or coordination. The study also reported that these clusters of wires block scenic views and make the surrounding streets and neighborhoods appear messy.

In an article for SunStar Cebu, Trina Louise Rivera explained that spaghetti wires often appear because of weak urban planning, unclear legal duties between utility companies and local government units, and a lack of accountability from the companies responsible for maintaining or removing the cables. A separate report from Visor.ph noted that many of the wires are not owned by the local electric company, Meralco, but are instead installed by internet and telecommunications providers, often without any clear labeling.

== Causes ==
The development of spaghetti wires has been linked to rapid urban growth and poorly coordinated utility installations. The 2024 multidisciplinary study described the phenomenon as a product of infrastructure projects executed without proper planning, oversight, or removal of redundant lines.

Local government have said that unclear rules and poor enforcement make the problem worse. In Manila, Mayor Isko Moreno instructed telecommunications, cable, and power companies to take down tangled or abandoned wires, warning that they pose a danger to pedestrians and block streets and sidewalks.

In Cebu City, the city government has suggested ordinances that would assign specific sections of utility posts to individual companies and raise the posts to prevent cables from overcrowding. There have also been proposals to move some utility lines underground, as is done in other countries, but financial and practical challenges have delayed these plans.
