= Jaro Floodway =

Artificial waterway in Iloilo, Philippines

Location
- Country: Philippines
- Province: Iloilo

Physical characteristics
- Source: Jaro River
  - location: Pavia, Iloilo
  - coordinates: 10°45′43″N 122°33′4″E
- Mouth: Iloilo Strait
  - location: Jaro, Iloilo City
  - coordinates: 10°44′36″N 122°35′19″E
- Length: 4.75 km (2.95 mi)

The Jaro Floodway is an artificially constructed waterway in Iloilo City, Philippines, designed to divert excess water from the tributaries of the Jaro River directly to the Iloilo Strait, reducing flood risks in the low-lying districts of La Paz, Lapuz, City Proper, and parts of Jaro.

It forms part of the Iloilo Flood Control Project (IFCP), a major infrastructure initiative of the Department of Public Works and Highways (DPWH). Planning for the project began in 1999 in response to the city’s recurring seasonal flooding. Construction started in 2006 and was completed in 2011. The project was financed through the Japan Bank for International Cooperation (JBIC) and implemented in two stages: the first undertaken by China International Water & Electric Corp., and the second by Hanjin Heavy Industries Co. Ltd. of Korea.
