= Institute for Cancer Prevention =

Defunct cancer center in New York, US

- Dissolved: 2004
- Type: Nonprofit / Research Institute
- Legal status: Defunct
- Purpose: Cancer prevention research
- Headquarters: Valhalla, New York, United States
- Formerly called: American Health Foundation

The Institute for Cancer Prevention (IFCP) in Valhalla, New York, formerly the American Health Foundation, was the only National Cancer Institute designated cancer center described as focusing solely on prevention.

It declared bankruptcy in 2004, three months after federal auditors determined that the institute had improperly sought grant money to cover unrelated expenses.
