= Megaworld Boulevard =

Thoroughfare in Iloilo City, Philippines

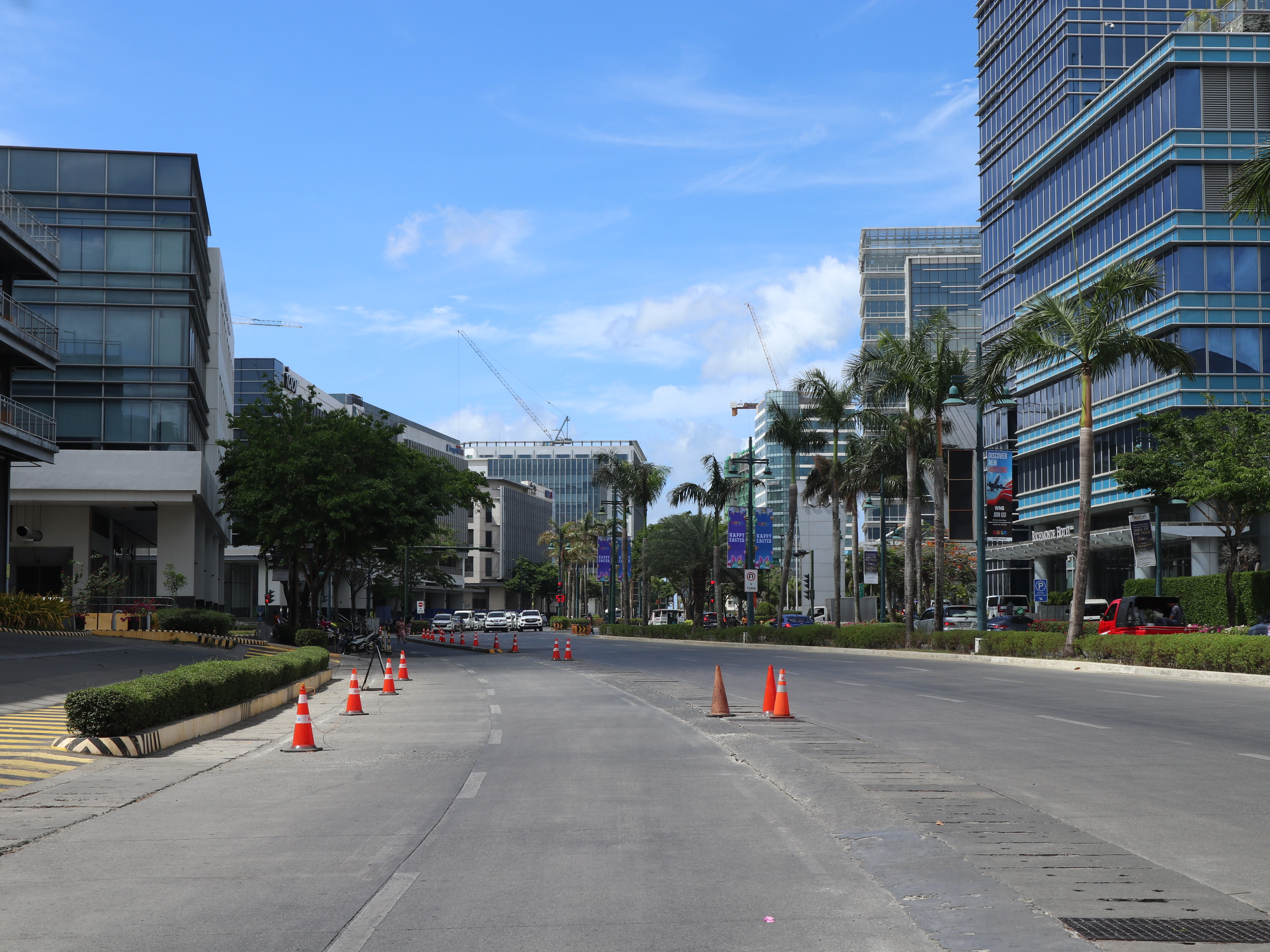
- Namesake: Megaworld Corporation
- Length: 1.91 km (1.19 mi)
- Location: Iloilo City, Philippines
- North end: Airport Road
- Major junctions: Q. Abeto Street
- South end: R. Mapa Street

Megaworld Boulevard is a six-lane road in Mandurriao, Iloilo City, Philippines. It serves as the main boulevard of the Iloilo Business Park. The boulevard runs diagonally in a north–south direction, almost parallel to Benigno S. Aquino Jr. Avenue. It connects Benigno S. Aquino Jr. Avenue in the north to Iloilo Sunset Boulevard in the south.

Before its transformation into a central business district, the area where the boulevard now runs was previously the runway of Mandurriao Airport.

== Route description ==
Megaworld Boulevard begins at Airport Road, an access road to Benigno S. Aquino Jr. Avenue in the north. The boulevard continues south, passing through an intersection with Q. Abeto Street and leading to Festive Walk Mall. It then intersects with Enterprise Road before passing by the Iloilo Convention Center and several BPO offices. The boulevard stretches through the financial district of Iloilo Business Park and ends at another major intersection with R. Mapa Street.

To the south, Sunset Boulevard North provides access to Iloilo Sunset Boulevard, which in turn connects to President Corazon C. Aquino Avenue and leads toward Oton.
