= Festive Walk Mall =

Mall in Iloilo City, Philippines

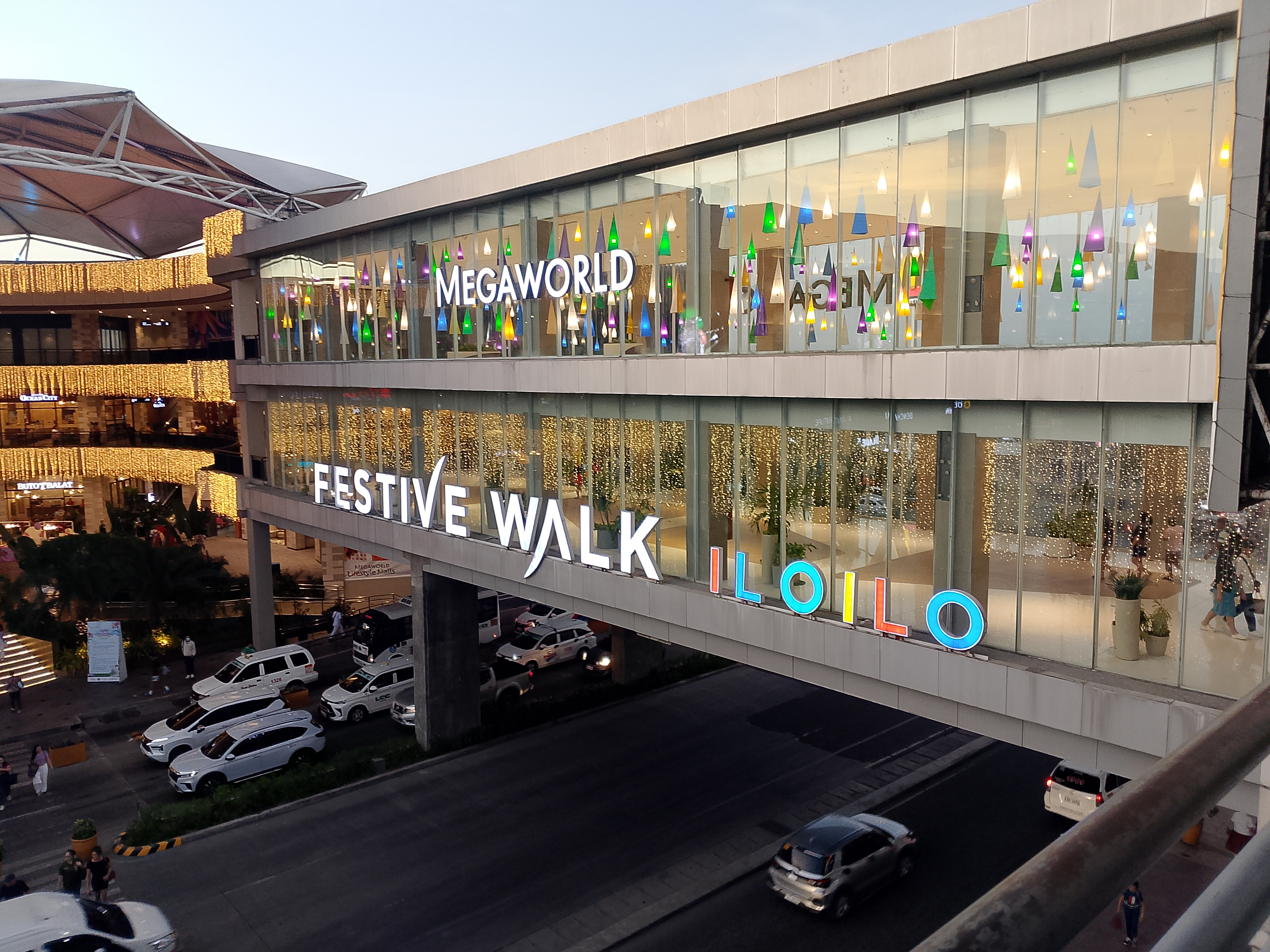
- Festive Walk Mall skybridge
- Location: Iloilo City, Philippines
- Coordinates: 10°43′04″N 122°32′49″E
- Address: Megaworld Blvd., Iloilo Business Park, Mandurriao, Iloilo City
- Opened: June 30, 2018; 8 years ago
- Developer: Megaworld Corporation
- Manager: Megaworld Lifestyle Malls
- Num. of stores: TBA
- Num. of anchor tenants: 4
- Floor area: 90,000 m^{2} (970,000 ft^{2})
- Floors: 3
- Parking: 1,000 slots
- Website: Megaworld Lifestyle Malls Official Website

Festive Walk Iloilo (also known as Festive Walk Mall or simply Festive among the locals) is a lifestyle mall development under Megaworld Lifestyle Malls, located along Megaworld Boulevard inside the 72-hectare Iloilo Business Park township of Megaworld Corporation in Mandurriao, Iloilo City.

Launched in 2018, the three-level main mall has 90,000 square meter of gross floor area and is Megaworld's first and biggest full-scale lifestyle malls outside of Luzon. Featuring a design inspired by Ilonggo's love for the arts, culture and celebrations, Festive Walk Mall won the Highly Commended Award for 'Best Retail Architectural Design' at the 2018 Philippines Property Awards.

Festive Walk Mall is well connected via covered walkways to the Festive Walk Mall Annex, Festive Walk Parade, the Iloilo Business Park Transport Hub and the Iloilo Museum of Contemporary Art (ILOMOCA)

== Mall features ==
=== First in Iloilo Features ===
Upon opening on June 30, 2018, Festive Walk Mall introduced new features which at that time were not yet available in Iloilo. Among these are:

- First Pet-Friendly Mall in Iloilo. Festive Walk Mall was the first Pet Friendly Mall in Iloilo and introduced the Pet Pass system to Ilonggo pet owners.
- First In-mall Dog Park in Iloilo. Festive Walk Mall has its own indoor dog park at the 3rd level, where guests can bring pets.
- First Dolby Atmos Theaters in Iloilo. Festive Walk Mall initially started with 7 state-of-the-art cinemas with 2 Dolby Atmos Theaters, but now it has been reduced to 3 digital cinemas plus a VIP cinema.
- First Iloilo and Western Visayas VIP Cinema Festive Walk Mall also introduced Iloilo's first VIP cinema equipped with adjustable food tray and LED lamp, unlimited popcorn and drinks, and call button for personal butler service.
- First Mall in Iloilo to have an Outdoor Park. Festive Walk Mall has an outdoor park and open space with roof gardens and greeneries located at its 3rd level called The Deck.
- First Mall in Iloilo to have its own Chapel. The St. Joseph Chapel is located at the 3rd Level of Festive Walk Mall.

=== First in Iloilo, Dining and Retail Brands ===
The Festive Walk's retail mix consists of international and homegrown dining and retail brands, including those that opened in Iloilo for the first time such as:

- Festive Market by Savemore (an affordable supermarket brand created by SM)
- LOCO Local Coffee (Authentic local coffee and coffee beans shop)
- Wilcon Home Essentials (the first in-mall store of Wilcon in Visayas)
- Coffee Bean and Tea Leaf
- The Marketplace
- La Lola Churreria
- DIY Hardware
- Japan Home Center
- Mumuso
- Nature Republic
- Henry's Professional
- Barking Cafe (the first coffee shop in Iloilo that allows pet owners to bring their pets into the cafe)

=== Festive Walk Mall Annex ===
Festive Walk Mall Annex is a three-level, 9,000 square meter complex located across Festive Walk Mall along Megaworld Boulevard, in Iloilo Business Park.

The new building, is directly connected to the main mall via an airconditioned skybridge at the second and third floors and connects to the multi-level parking building where the mall's transport hub is located.

Festive Walk Mall Annex is also home to The Marketplace, the first Iloilo branch of the supermarket chain, the first in-mall showroom of BMW, which marks the first entry of the German luxury carmaker to Iloilo, as well as a host of shops and services, medical facilities.

The mall extension is also home to satellite offices of various government agencies including PhilHealth, Land Transportation Office (LTO) and Bureau of Immigration.

=== Festive Walk Parade ===
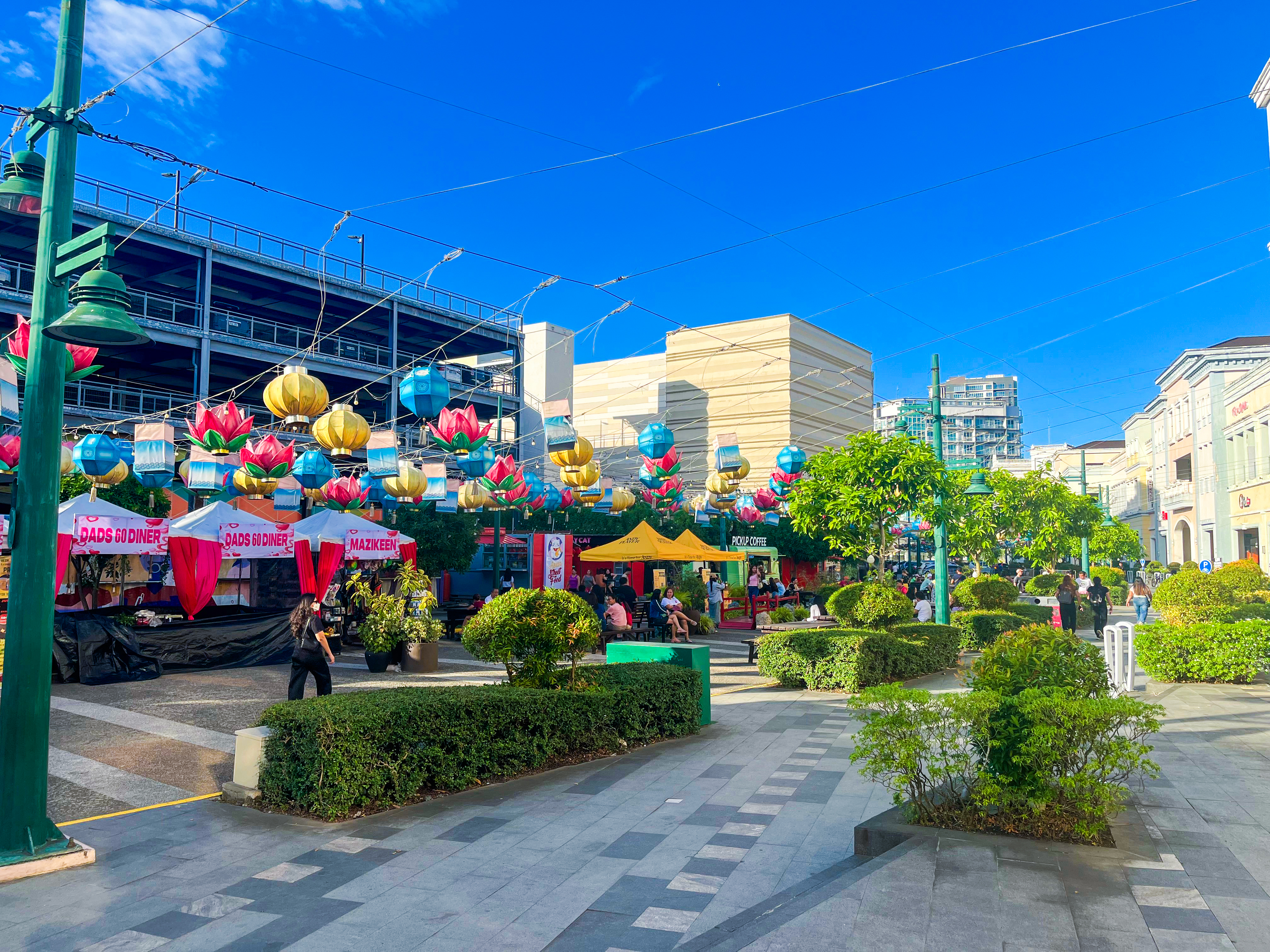
Iloilo K-Town in Festive Walk Parade

Festive Walk Parade is a 1.1 km retail and commercial strip in Iloilo Business Park. It is known as a nightlife destination and hosts the nightly street party “Festive Nights”. Festive Walk Parade's restaurant row on its second floor also offers alfresco dining and views of the landscaped Park Square where a monument of Ilonggo revolutionary hero, General Martin Delgado stands. It also features a K-Town (Koreatown) where Korean restaurants are lined up.

The exterior design of Festive Walk Parade is designed after the Santana Row development in California, with touches of art nouveau and art deco. It is directly connected via elevated walkways to Festive Walk Mall Annex, Festive Walk Mall and Iloilo Transport Hub.

At the edge Festive Walk Parade is the Casa Emperador, which is home to the Iloilo Museum of Contemporary Art.

=== Iloilo Museum for Contemporary Art (ILOMOCA) ===
First inaugurated on March 17, 2018, the P109-million ILOMOCA – is the first contemporary art museum in Visayas and Mindanao, located at the edge of Festive Walk Parade inside the Iloilo Business Park township in Mandurriao, Iloilo City. The museum has direct interconnections to Festive Walk Mall Annex, Festive Walk Mall and Iloilo Business Park Transport Hub.

The museum features four main galleries, five exhibit halls, and 3,000 square feet in exhibition space. Since its launch, ILOMOCA has helped position Iloilo Business Park as a rising art district.

=== Science XPdition Iloilo ===
Located on the third level of Festive Walk Mall, Science XPdition Iloilo is Iloilo City's first museum entirely dedicated to science, learning, and discovery. Spanning 1,650 square meters, it features over 100 interactive exhibits and more than 100 hands-on experiments across 10 themed laboratories.

== Gallery ==
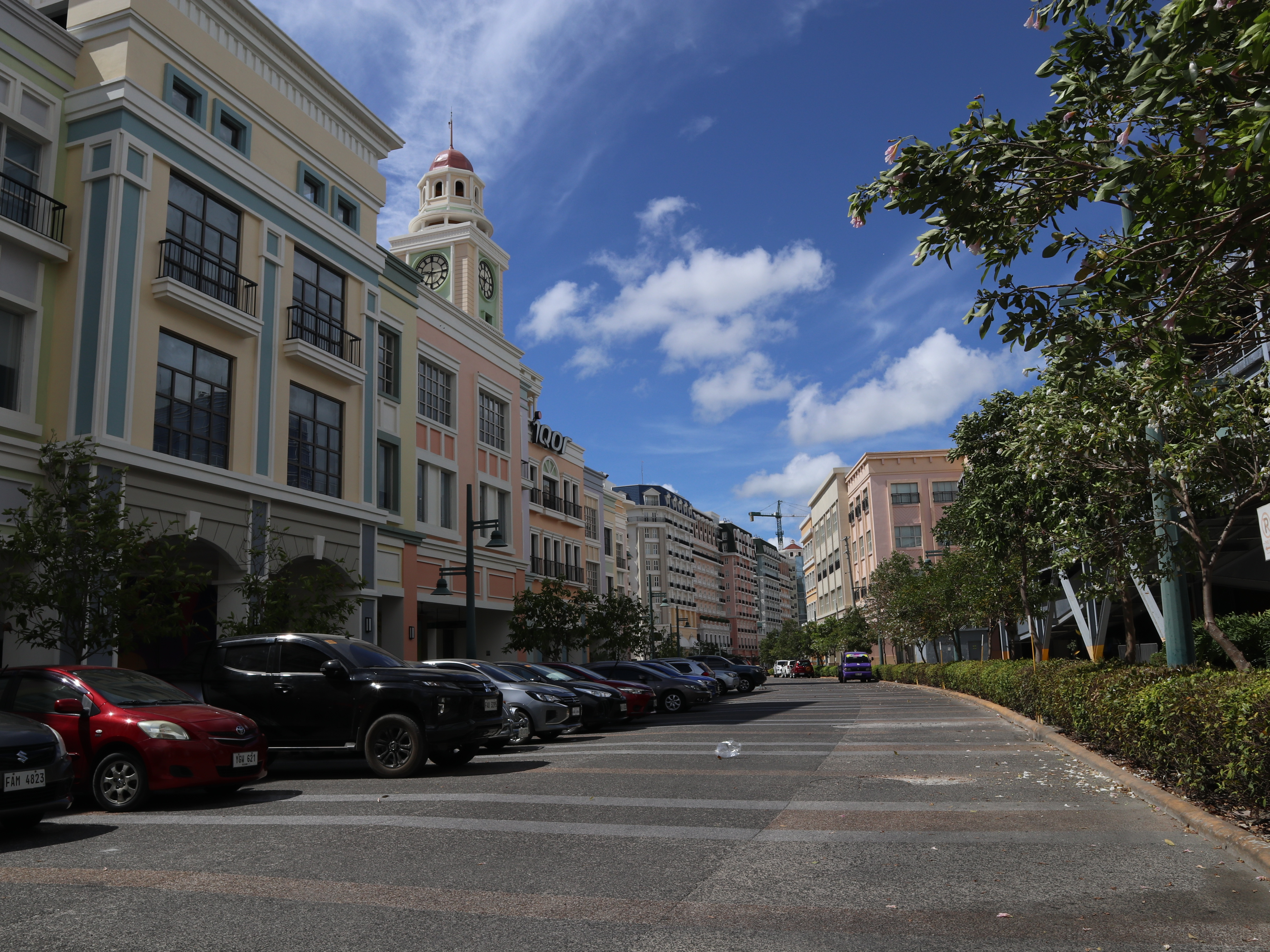

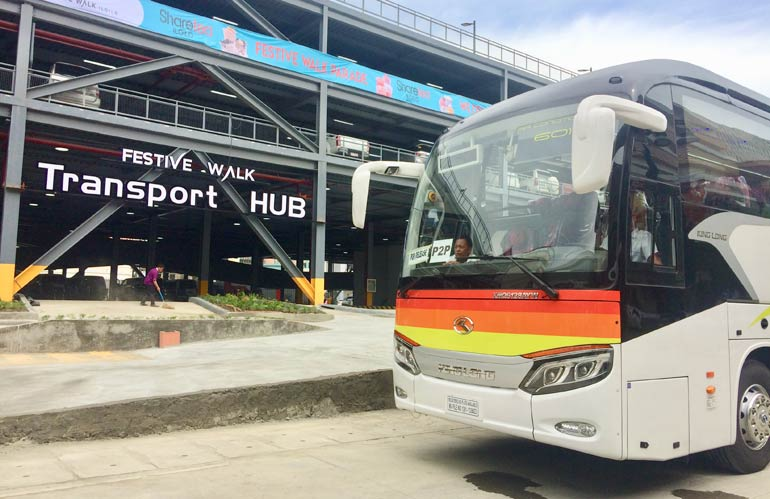

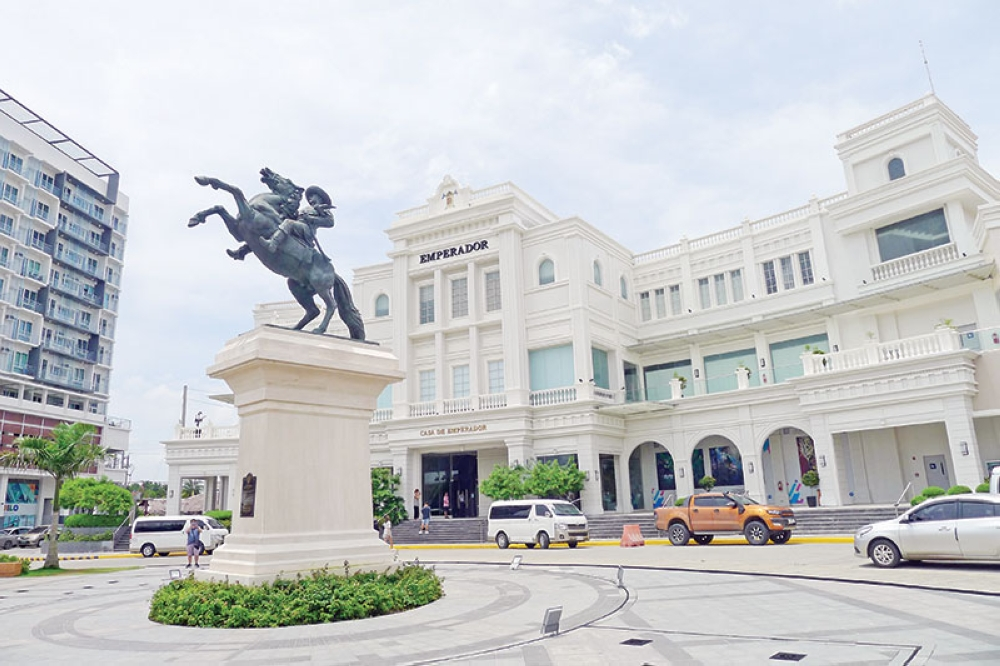

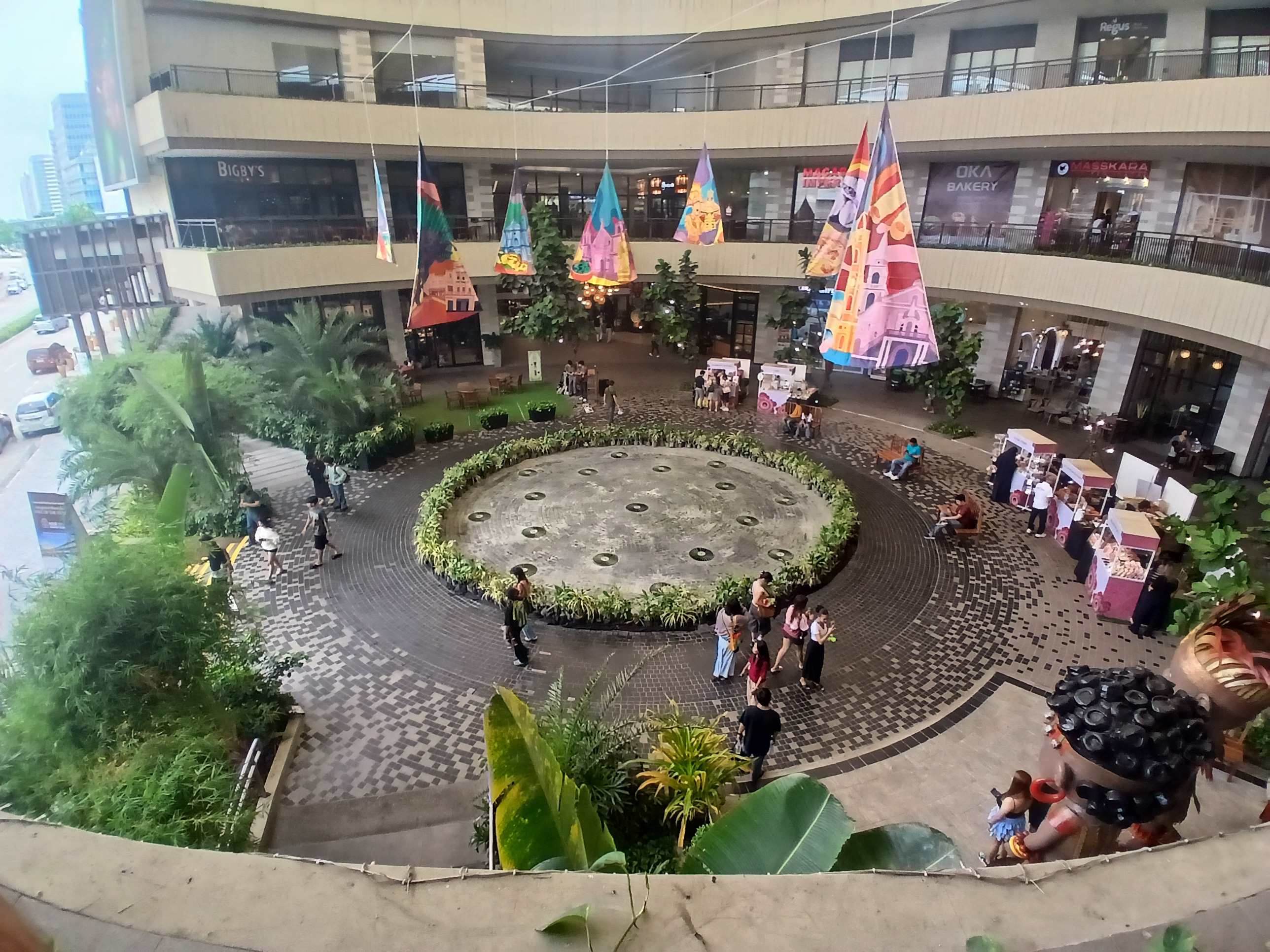
