= Iloilo Convention Center =

- Official logo since 2019

- Facade of Iloilo Convention Center

- Location within Visayas Location within Philippines
- Alternative names: ICON; ICC

General information
- Type: Convention center
- Location: Megaworld Blvd., Iloilo Business Park, Mandurriao, Iloilo City, Philippines
- Coordinates: 10°42′52″N 122°32′41″E
- Construction started: 2013
- Completed: 2015
- Cost: 747 million

Technical details
- Floor count: 2
- Floor area: 11,832 m^{2} (127,360 sq ft)

Design and construction
- Architect: William V. Coscolluela
- Architecture firm: W.V. Coscolluela and Associates (WVCA)

Other information
- Seating capacity: 4,200

Iloilo Convention Center (ICON) is a convention center in Iloilo Business Park, in the district of Mandurriao, Iloilo City, Philippines. It stands on the site of Iloilo's former airport, Mandurriao Airport.

== History ==
=== Iloilo-Mandurriao Airport ===
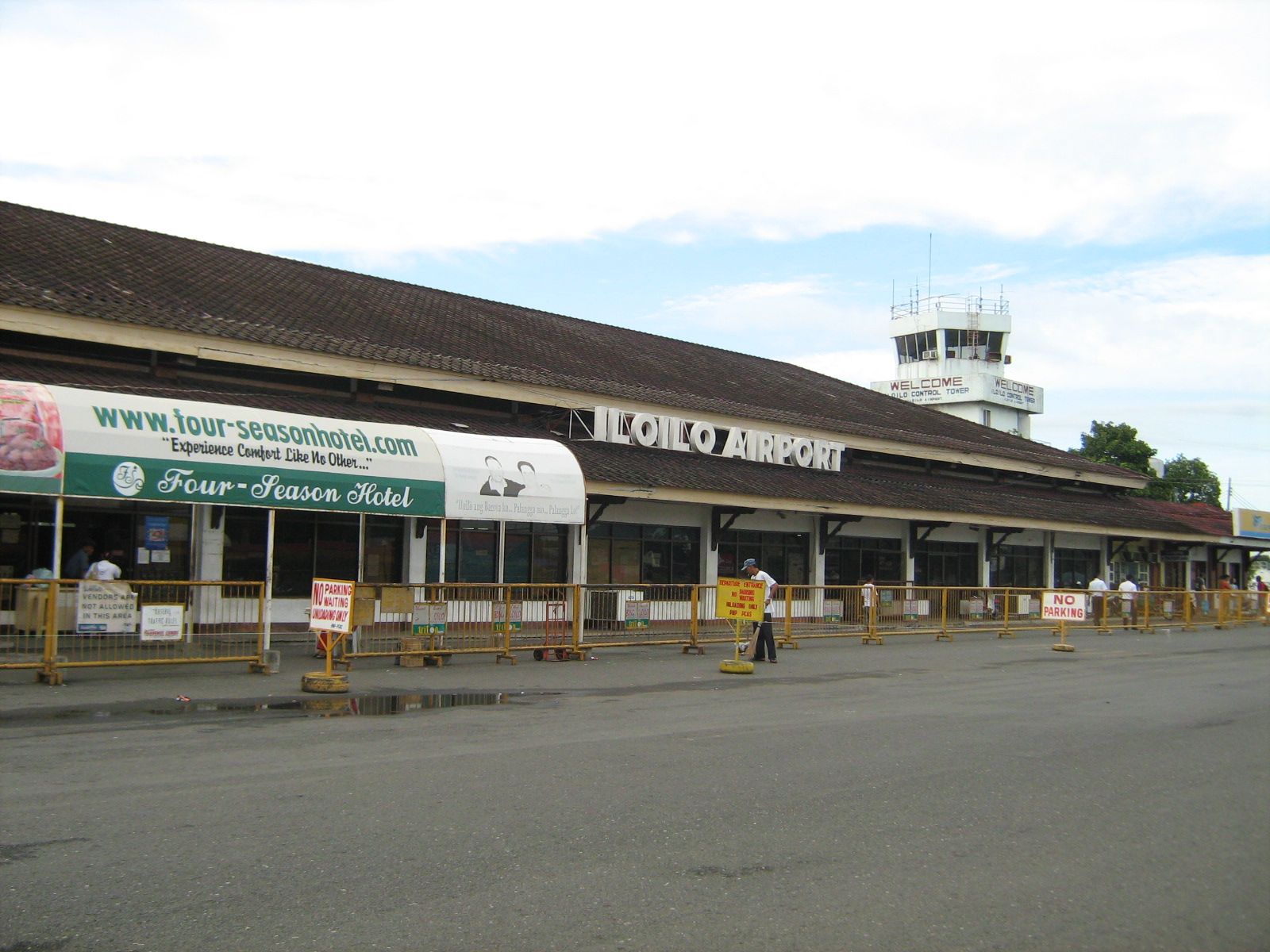
Mandurriao Airport in 2006

Iloilo's former airport, Manduriao Airport, occupied the site from 1937 until late 2011 (the airport itself ceased operations in June 2007). In the 1990s, Mandurriao Airport was plagued with a myriad of problems such as outdated facilities and amenities, poor passenger comfort, operation limitations due to many obstacles, and limited expandability. The airport complex likewise was located directly alongside major city thoroughfares, in particular the city's main highway, the Tomas Confesor Highway, which complicated the flow of traffic in and around the area. At one point, the Civil Aviation Authority of the Philippines, then known as "Philippine Air Transportation Office", which was already having difficulty managing vehicular traffic around the airport, proposed banning cargo and delivery trucks from passing through the road in front of the terminal building. However, the city government did not respond. This prompted authorities to have a new airport built outside Iloilo City, eventually selecting the municipality of Cabatuan for the new airport. The site of Iloilo International Airport is close to Barangay Tiring, where a World War II airfield formerly stood.

The airport's passenger terminal, built in 1982, was left abandoned after the airport's closure and stood for many years alongside the control tower. Sometime between 2012 and 2013, the airport's terminal was demolished after the entire airport complex was acquired by Megaworld Corporation. The control tower, demolished in 2021, was left untouched and served as a monument to Iloilo's aviation history and Philippine aviation history as well as a homage to Pope John Paul II's 1981 visit to the Philippines, as Iloilo was one of his destinations in his 1981 itinerary and Iloilo's airport that year was in Mandurriao.

=== ICon ===
Iloilo Convention Center's construction was completed in September 2015 in time for the APEC 2015. The 1.7-hectare (4.2-acre) lot where it stands on was donated by Megaworld Corp. The Tourism Infrastructure and Enterprise Zone Authority allocated P200 million for the construction of the convention center, while another P250 million was sourced from the Priority Development Assistance Fund of Senator Franklin Drilon.

== Design ==
The convention center designed by Ilonggo architect, William Coscolluela. The design was inspired by Iloilo's Dinagyang and Paraw Regatta festivals. The paraw is a native double outrigger sailboat in the Visayas region, used in the annual Paraw Regatta Festival sailboat race. Abstract designs of the Dinagyang Festival are featured on the glass walls of the center.

It is a two-storey structure with a total floor area of 11,832 square metres (127,360 sq ft). The main hall on the ground floor has a 3,700-seat capacity and 500-seat function rooms on the second floor. A rooftop of 1,500 square metres (16,000 sq ft) is available for outdoor functions.

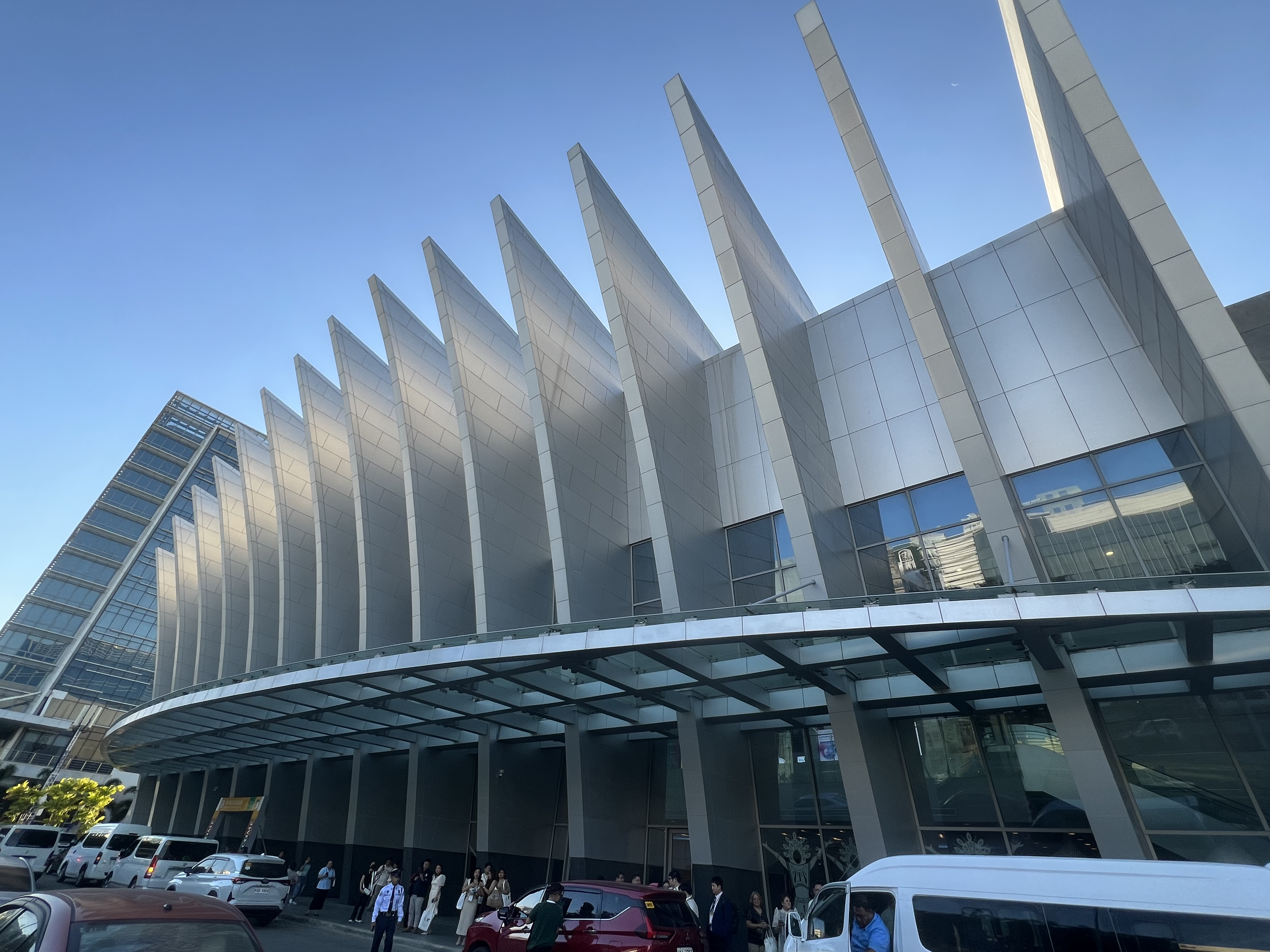
Closeup of façade

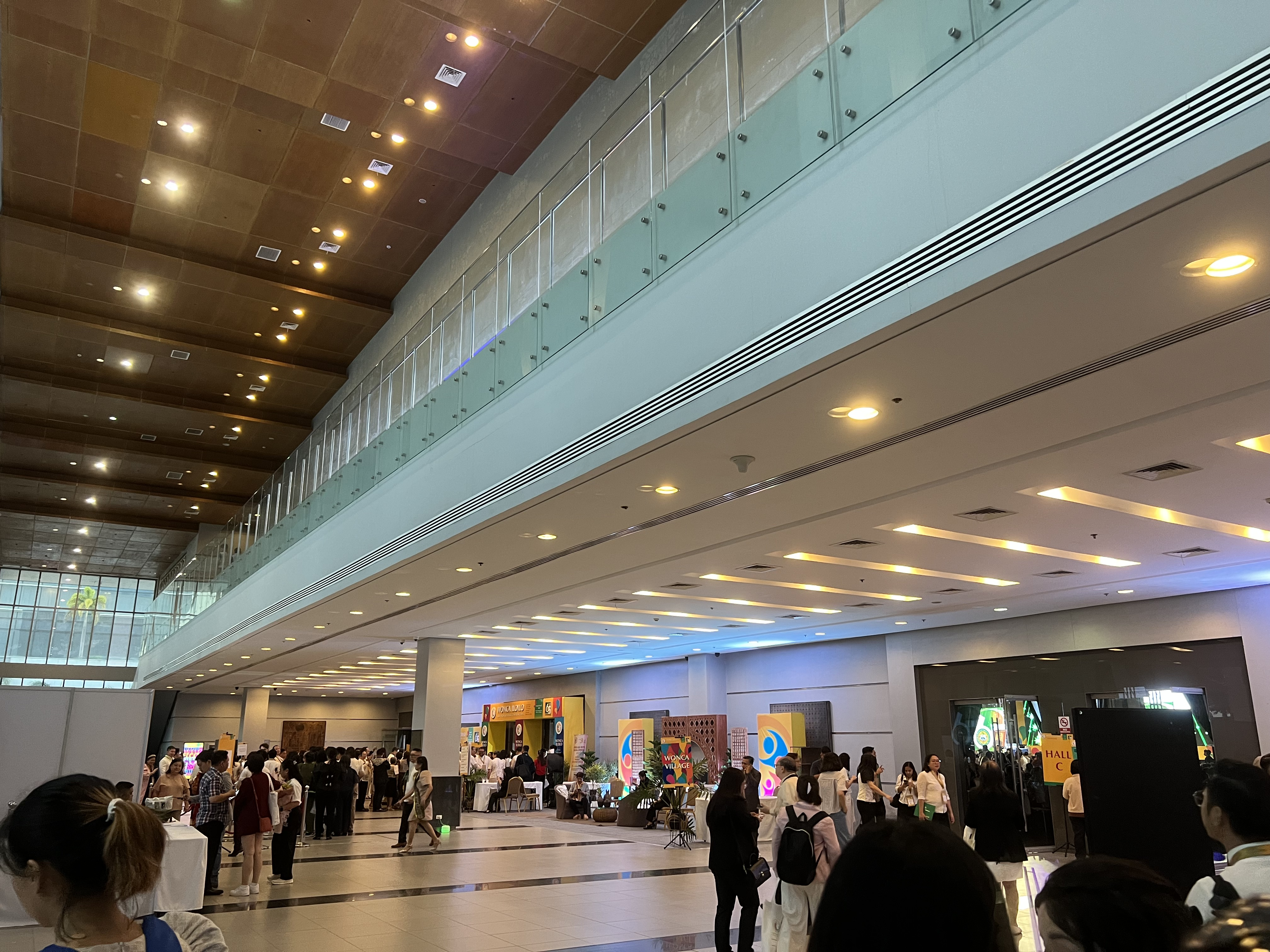
Front lobby

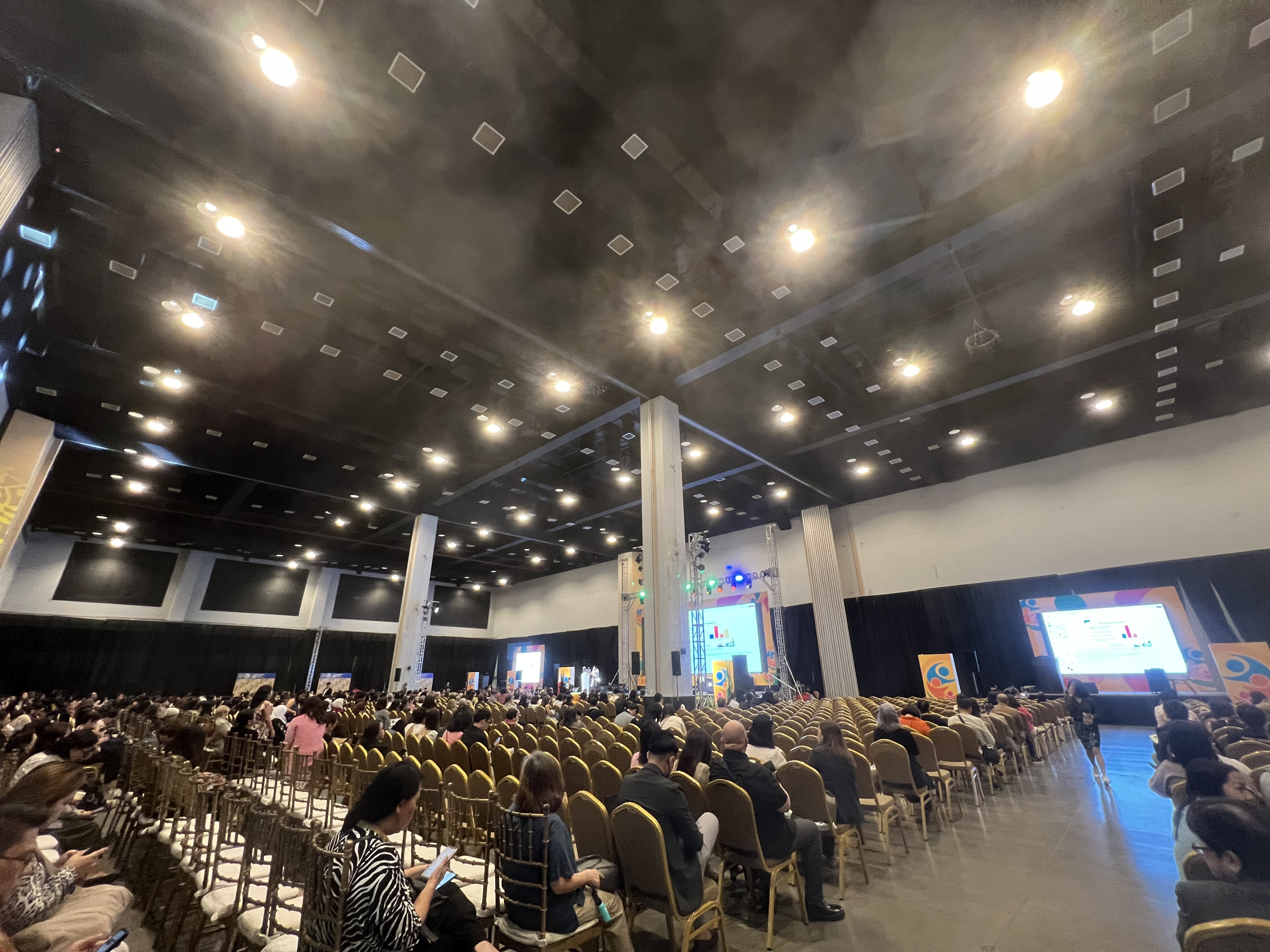
Halls A to C

== Inauguration ==
President Benigno Aquino III led the inauguration on September 14, 2015. Senator Franklin Drilon who was instrumental in the realization of this project introduced the president and also gave his message. Congressman Jerry Treñas, Governor Arthur Defensor Sr., Mayor Jed Patrick Mabilog led the local officials who welcomed President Aquino. Also in attendance are Department of Public Works and Highways Secretary Rogelio Singson and Department of Tourism Secretary Ramon Jimenez Jr. whose departments contributed to the project construction.

== APEC Meetings ==
Asia-Pacific Economic Cooperation (APEC) 2015 meetings scheduled at the center include:

1. Small and Medium Enterprise ministerial meeting on September 21–25

2. Senior Disaster Management Officials Forum on September 22–23

3. High-Level Policy Dialogue on Food Security and the Blue Economy and Related Meetings on September 28 to October 6, 2015
