= Brandy Museum (Philippines) =

Brandy museum in Iloilo City, Philippines

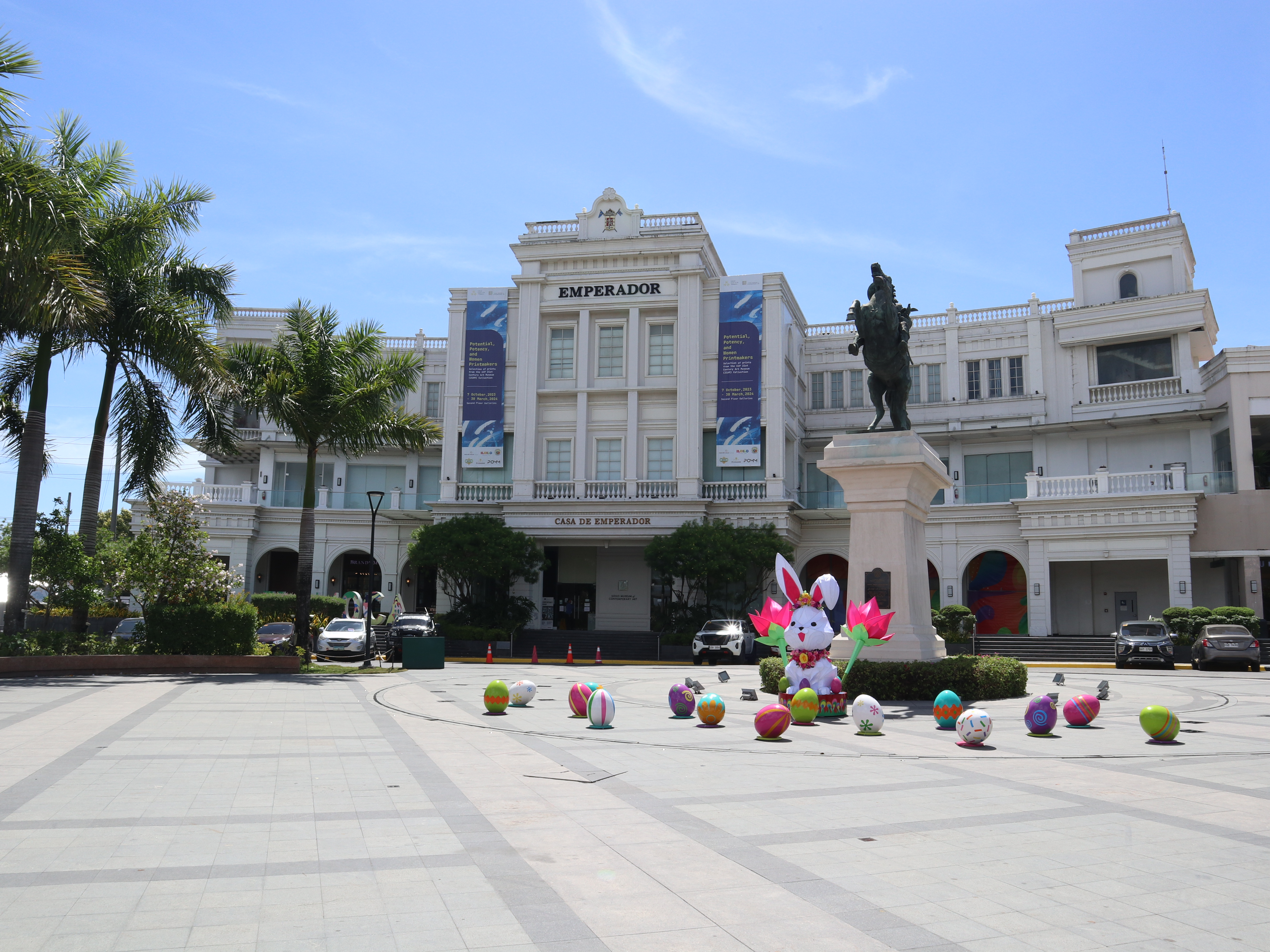
- Brandy Museum housed at the Casa de Emperador
- Established: January 6, 2022
- Location: Casa de Emperador, Iloilo Business Park, Mandurriao, Iloilo City, Philippines
- Coordinates: 10°43′5.82″N 122°32′54.22″E
- Type: Brandy museum

The Brandy Museum is a museum dedicated to brandy, located in Iloilo Business Park, Mandurriao, Iloilo City, Philippines. It is the first and only museum of its kind in the country. Owned and operated by Emperador, Inc., the museum opened its doors in 2022.

The museum is situated at Casa de Emperador, next to the Iloilo Museum of Contemporary Art (ILOMOCA).

== Exhibits ==
The museum's gallery features a collection of preserved books, letters, brandy-making tools, and soil samples, offering visitors a glimpse into the age-old practice of brandy production. The exhibits also highlight the histories of five brandy brands under Emperador, Inc.: Fundador, Tres Capas, Terry Centenario, Garvey, Soyo, and Espléndido.

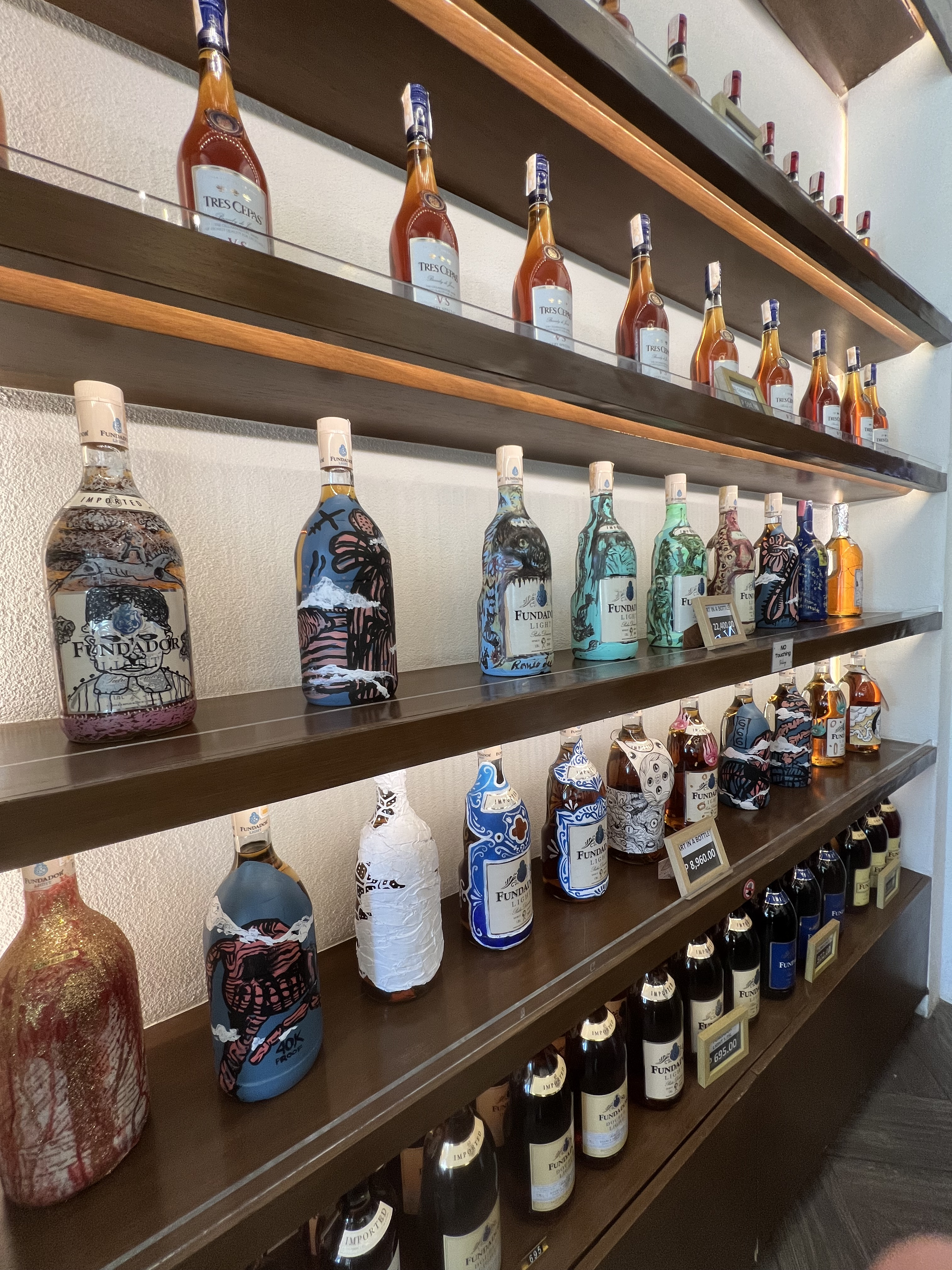
Decorated brandy bottles

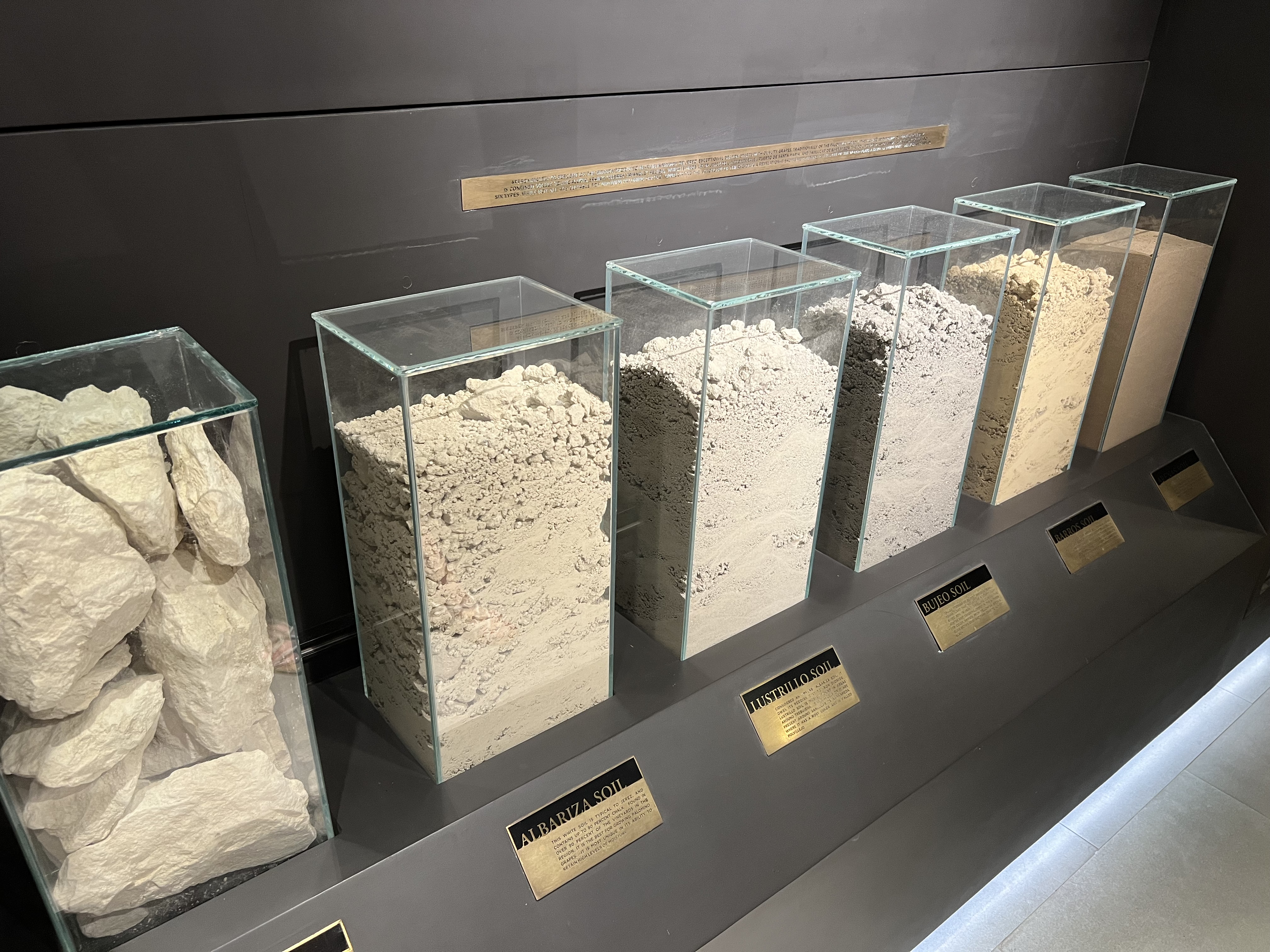
Soils used in grapevine cultivation

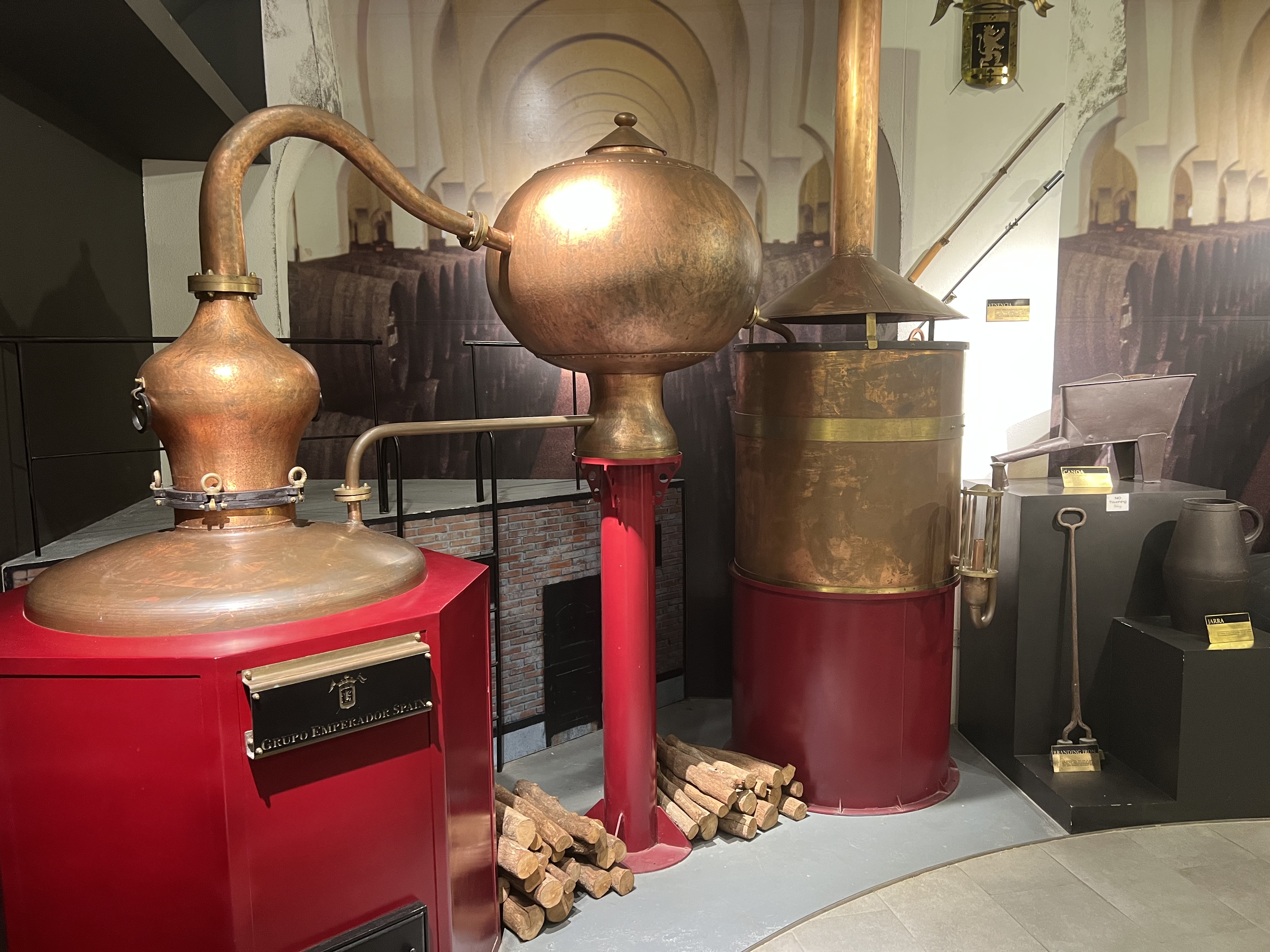
Equipment used in brandy production

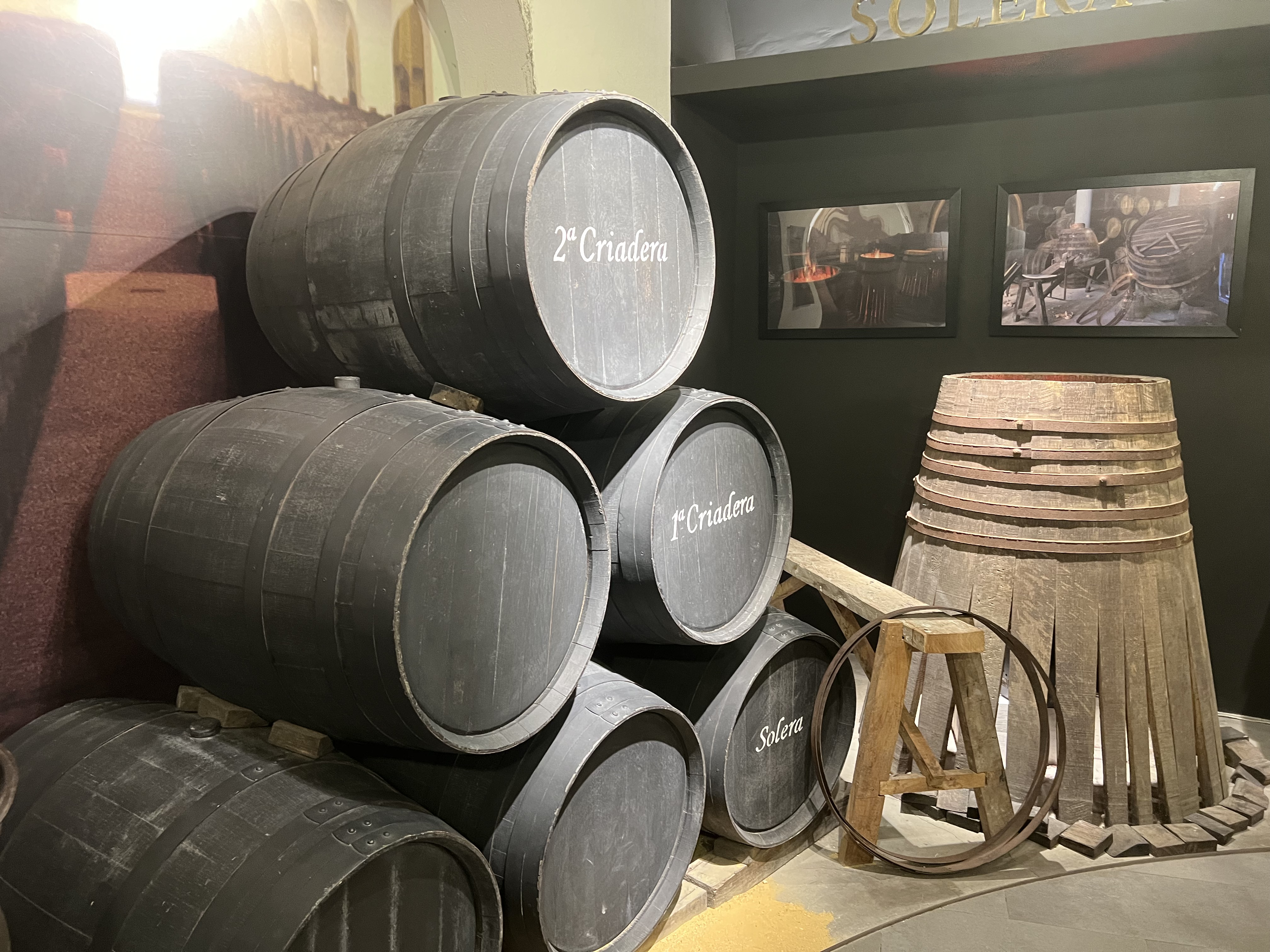
Casks for storing brandy
