= Iloilo Business Park =

Central business district in Western Visayas, Philippines

- Central business district
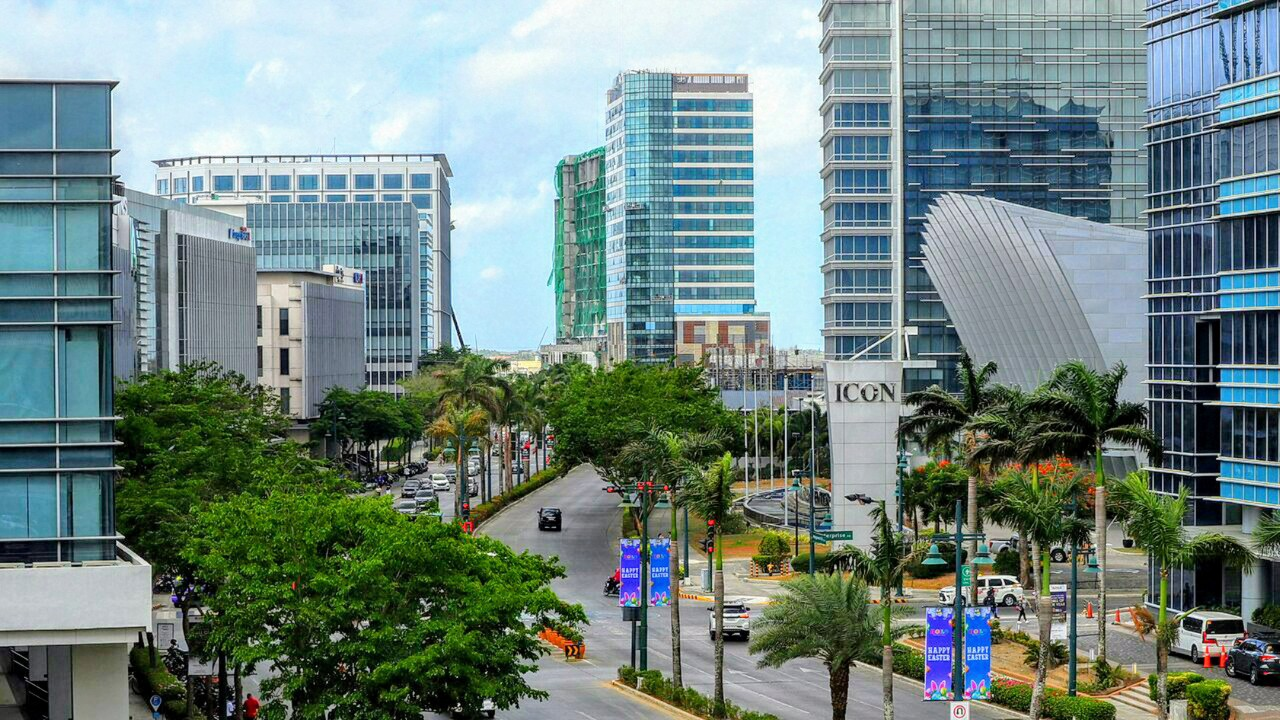
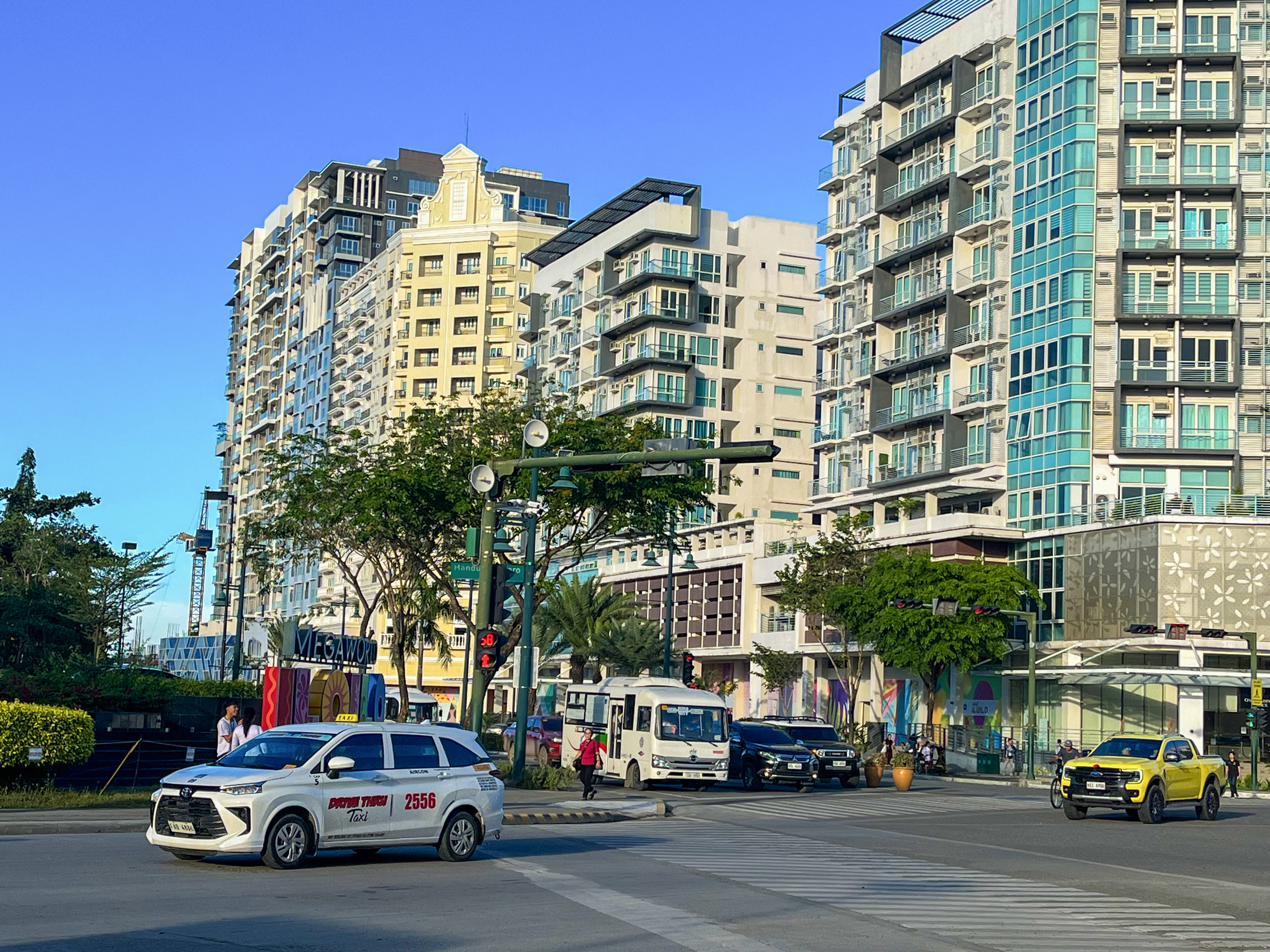
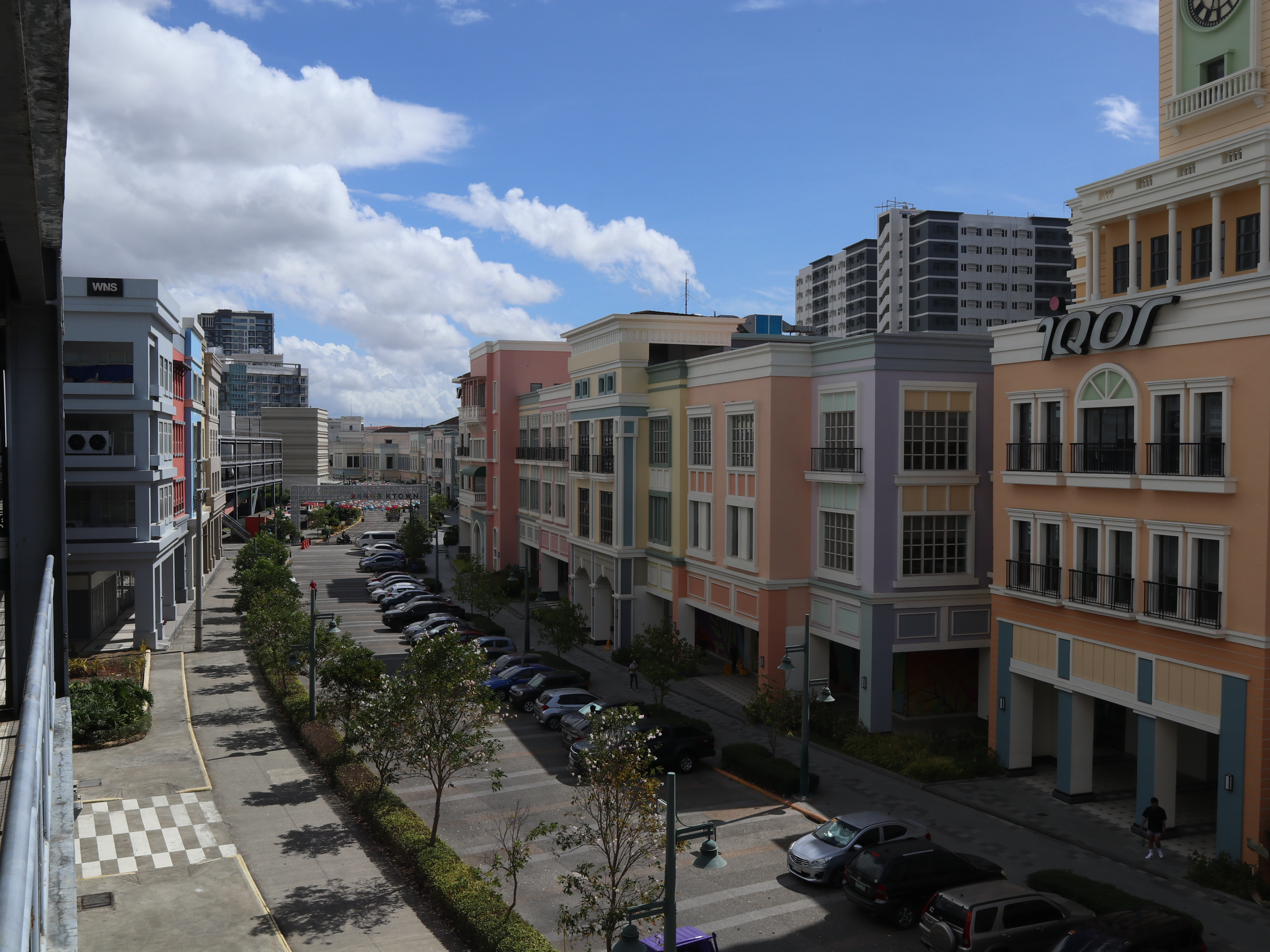
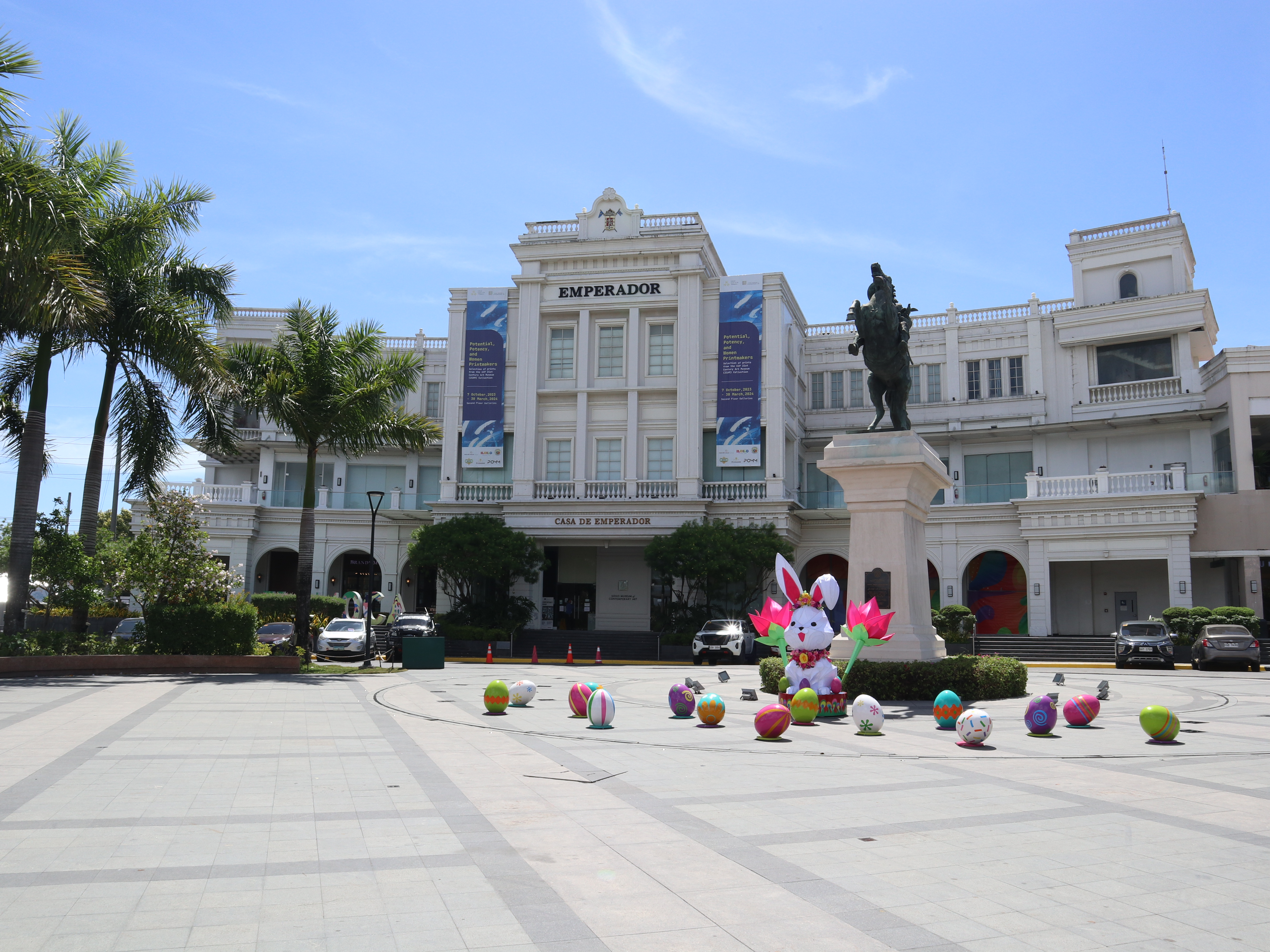
- From left to right: Skyline, Megaworld Boulevard, Iloilo Convention Center, Festive Walk Parade, Casa de Emperador

- Nicknames: Megaworld; IBP
- Interactive map of Iloilo Business Park
- Location within Philippines
- Coordinates: 10°42′53″N 122°32′41″E
- Country: Philippines
- Region: Western Visayas
- Province: Iloilo
- City: Iloilo City
- District: Mandurriao

Area
  - Total: 0.72 km^{2} (0.28 sq mi)
- Time zone: UTC+8 (PST)
- Zip code: 5000
- Area code: 33
- Website: iloilobusinessparkph.com

Iloilo Business Park (also known as IBP or Megaworld (Note: after the developer's name, Megaworld Corporation)) is a 72-hectare (180-acre) mixed-use master-planned central business district in Mandurriao, Iloilo City, Philippines by Megaworld Corporation. It is an integrated township project featuring a financial district, a lifestyle mall, office buildings catering to business process outsourcing firms, boutique and deluxe hotels, a convention center, and medical services facilities.

Iloilo Business Park was the site of Mandurriao Airport, the former main airport of Iloilo until 2007, when Megaworld Corporation acquired the property and developed it into a mixed-use development. Since then, the area has experienced significant growth and is now bounded by two other major developments in Mandurriao, namely SM Iloilo of SM Prime to its east and Atria Park District of Ayala Land to its southeast.

Iloilo Business Park has been officially recognized as the center of arts and culture in Iloilo City.

== History ==
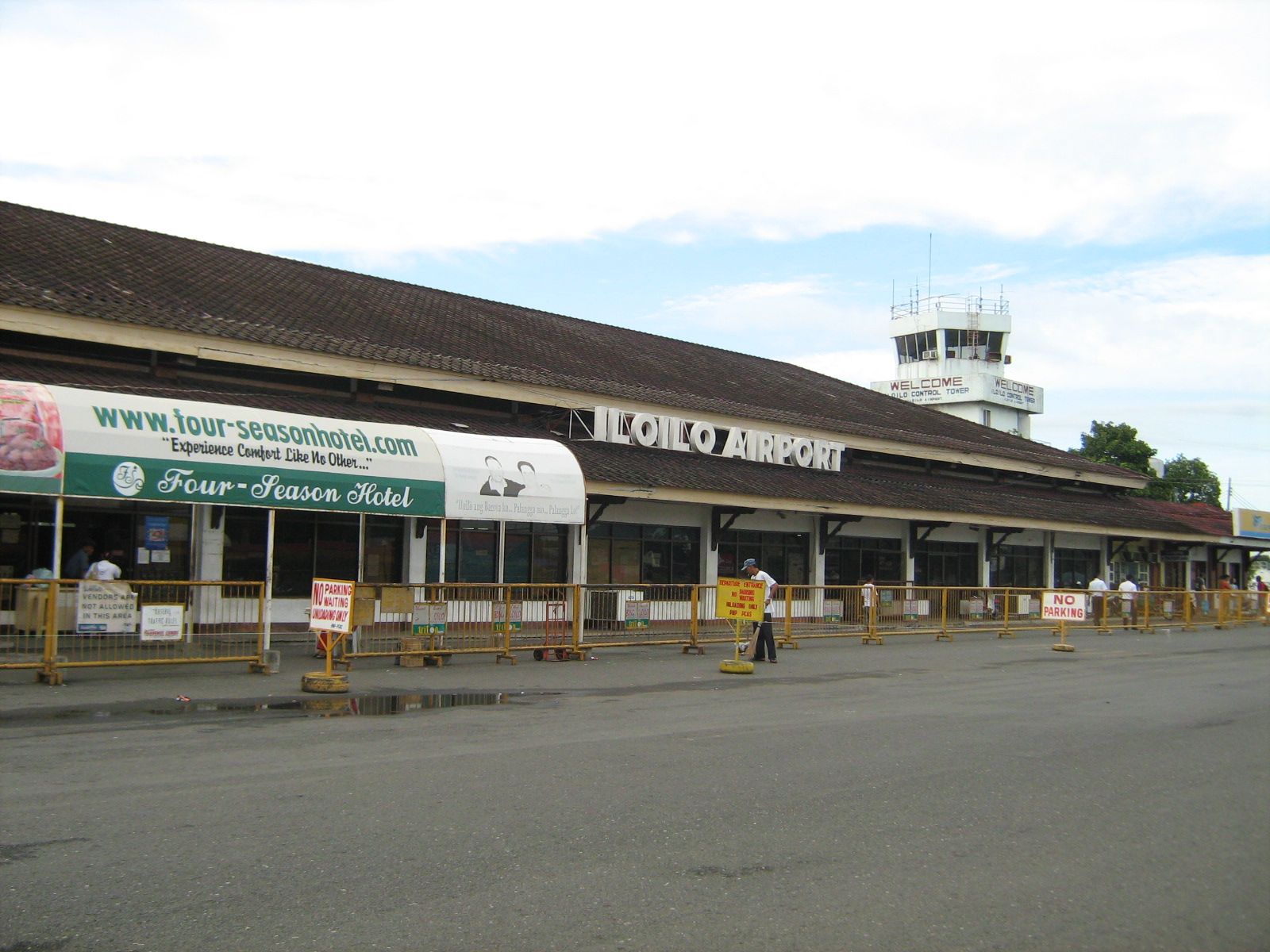
The terminal building of Mandurriao Airport, where the Iloilo Convention Center now stands

Iloilo Business Park is located on the site of Iloilo's former airport, Mandurriao Airport, which the conglomerate acquired for 1.2 Billion Pesos from the Philippine national government. Megaworld is projected to pour in ₱25 Billion for the entire development in a span of years. Initial development includes construction of a road network, the 12-storey Richmonde Hotel Iloilo and Richmonde Tower, Festive Walk, Two Business Process Outsourcing office buildings. The IT complex has been certified as an information technology park by the Philippine Economic Zone Authority (PEZA), granting locators perks such as tax holidays and duty-free importation of equipment among others.

Megaworld is setting aside a 9.7-hectare (24-acre) lot for the boutique hotel and commercial district which is being offered to interested business owners.

Iloilo Business Park increased by an additional 18 hectares (44 acres), including Barangay Santa Rosa located northwest of the initial property, bringing the project to roughly 72 hectares (180 acres) from its initial 54.5 hectares (135 acres). This is due to the increasing demand for residential and commercial properties and good reception to Megaworld's first development in the region and biggest township in the Visayas, modeled after the live-work-play approach that it claims to have pioneered in the Philippines.

In 2025, the Iloilo City Government under Mayor Raisa Treñas declared the Iloilo Business Park as the 'Center of Arts and Culture' of the city through an executive order.

== Developments ==
South/central and north sections of Iloilo Business Park
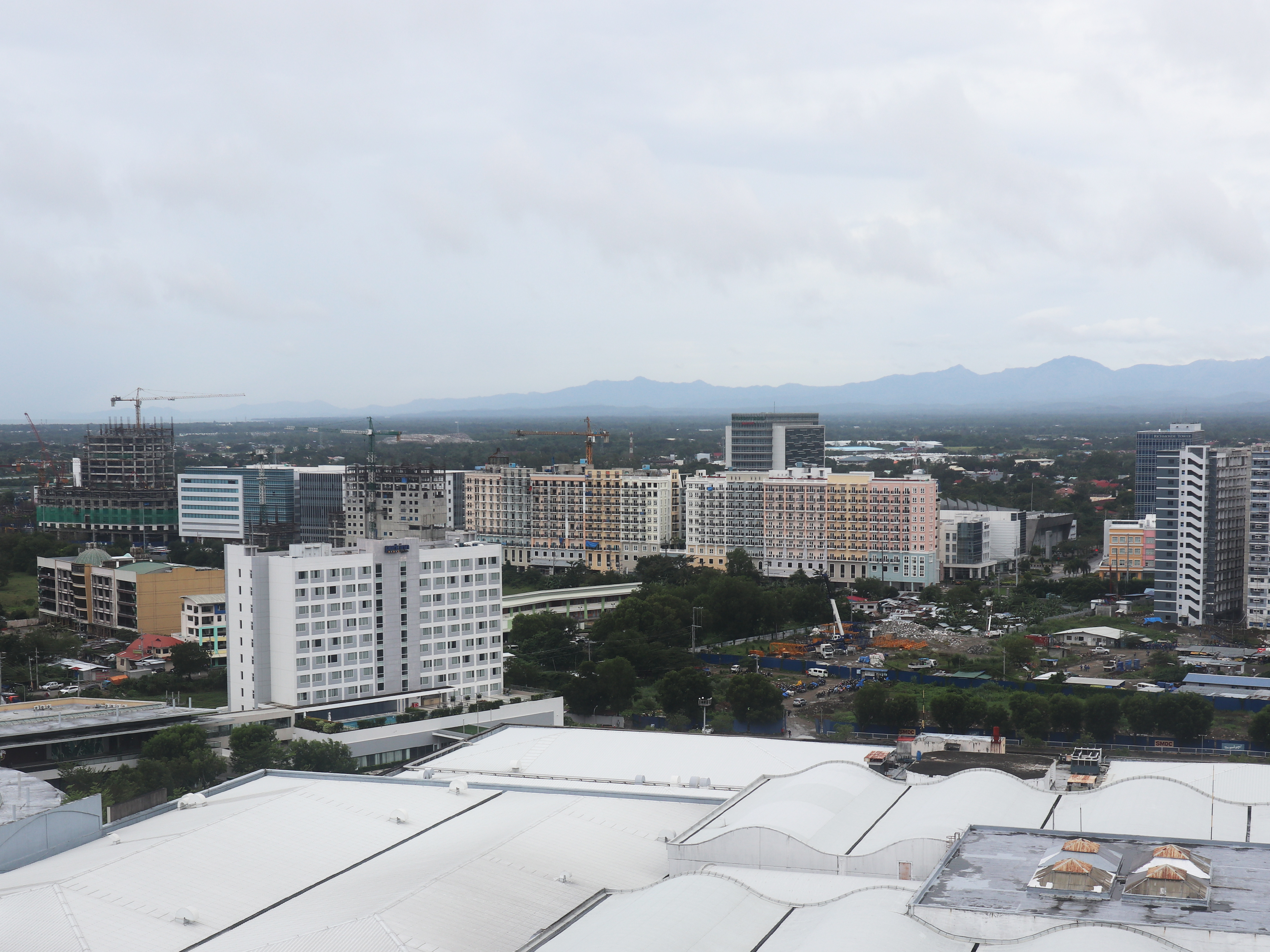
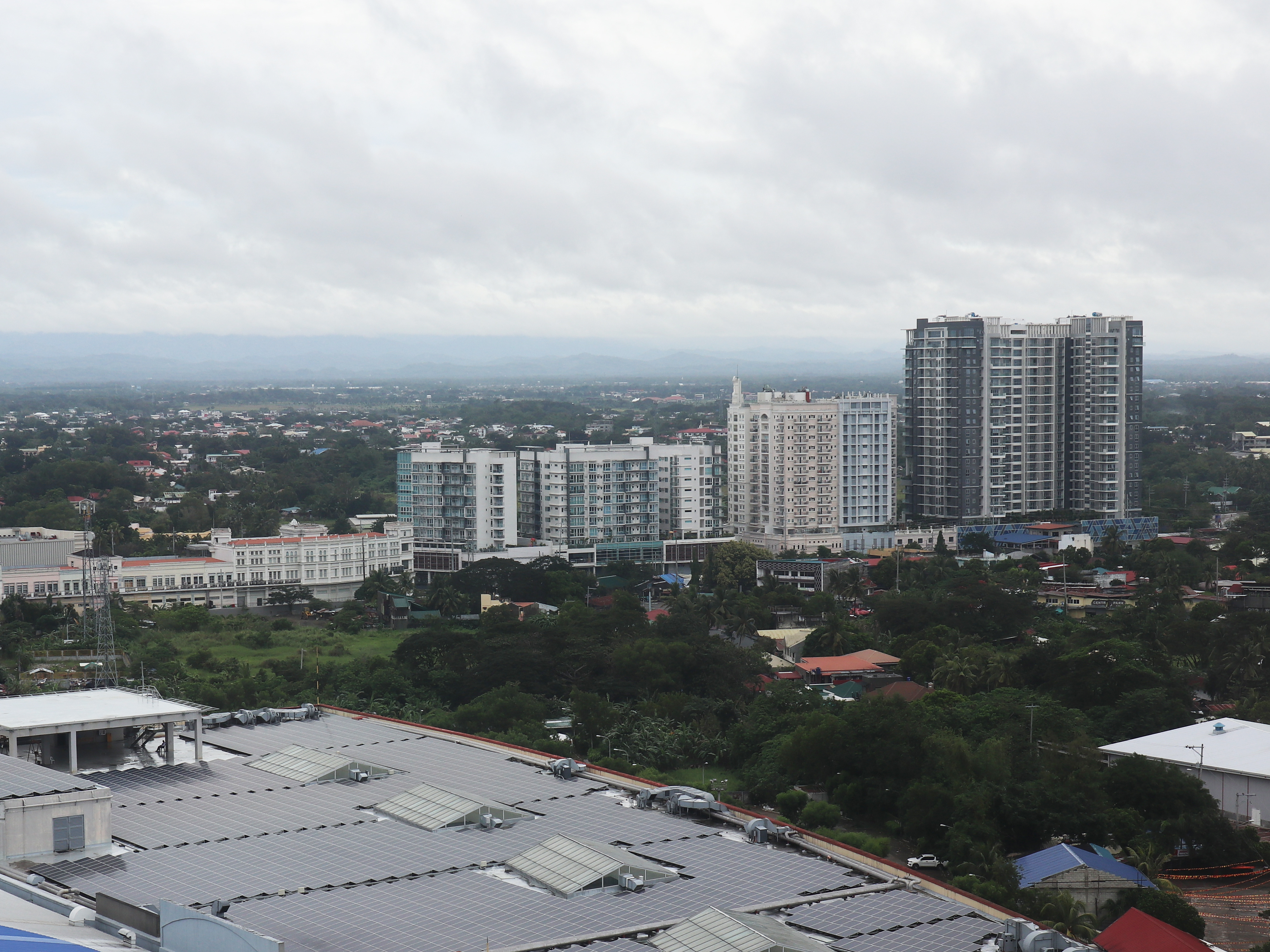

=== Residential ===
One Madison Place Luxury Residences is the first residential development built by Megaworld within Iloilo Business Park. It is composed of three 10-storey mid-rise towers located along Megaworld Boulevard.

Lafayette Park Square, the township's second condominium project, is a 14-storey single tower designed with French and Spanish architectural influences.

The Palladium, launched in October 2014, is the tallest residential condominium in Iloilo Business Park. Rising 80 meters with 22 floors, it is also the first in Western Visayas to feature sky gardens on selected levels overlooking Iloilo City. The top floor features exclusive loft-type units ranging from 76 to 115 square meters.

Megaworld introduced its fourth and fifth residential developments in 2017: Saint Honore and Saint Dominique. Both are Paris-inspired mid-rise condominiums with ten levels, featuring 168 and 152 units respectively. The two towers share a common podium, amenities, and each development includes a planned second tower.

The Pinnacle, the sixth condominium within the township, is a 20-storey luxury residential tower to be developed beside the International Corporate Plaza.

Megaworld's seventh condominium, and ninth residential tower in the township, is Firenze, a 22-storey tower inspired by the Italian city of Florence. It is planned to rise next to The Palladium at the northern section of Megaworld Boulevard.

=== Office buildings ===
The first three office towers developed in Iloilo Business Park, One Global Center, Two Global Center, and the Richmonde Tower, were primarily built to accommodate business process outsourcing (BPO) companies. Together, they offer a combined 25,000 square meters of leasable space and can host around 10,000 employees. The Richmonde Tower also houses the Richmonde Hotel Iloilo.

Construction of two additional BPO-oriented office towers, One Techno Place and Two Techno Place, began in 2015. These developments will add approximately 19,000 square meters of leasable space, providing capacity for an additional 8,000 workers. Other IT-BPO office towers within the township include the Festive Walk Parade Tower, One Fintech Place, and Two Fintech Place.

Aside from buildings catering mainly to BPO locators, Iloilo Business Park also has several corporate office developments in the pipeline. The most notable is the International Corporate Plaza, a 19-storey tower designed as a green, sustainable office building, touted as the first of its kind in Western Visayas. Major banks such as Metrobank and UnionBank of the Philippines have also announced plans to build their regional corporate offices within the township.

=== Hotels ===
Richmonde Hotel Iloilo occupies the ground floor and the 7th to 12th floors of the Iloilo Richmonde Tower. It features 149 guest rooms and serves both business travelers and tourists. It is also the first Richmonde Hotel established outside Metro Manila.

Courtyard by Marriott Iloilo is a 15-storey hotel developed by Megaworld Corporation in partnership with Marriott International. It offers 326 rooms and suites and opened on May 1, 2018. It is the first Courtyard by Marriott property in the Philippines and the first Marriott-branded hotel in the Visayas and Mindanao regions in two decades, following the rebranding of Marriott Cebu into Seda Cebu.

Belmont Hotel Iloilo is a 12-storey hotel opened on June 24, 2026. It is the largest hotel in Iloilo City with a total of 405 rooms. It is the second Belmont brand property in Western Visayas, after the one in Boracay.

=== Commercial ===
Festive Walk Iloilo is Megaworld's first stand-alone lifestyle mall in the Visayas and Mindanao, and the first upscale mall in Iloilo. The development consists of two buildings, a three-level main mall and a three-level annex, featuring retail shops, dining establishments, cinemas, and event spaces. The Marketplace by Rustan's serves as one of the main supermarket anchors, while Festive Market by Savemore also operates as a supermarket within the complex.

Festive Walk Parade is a 1.1-kilometer outdoor commercial and retail strip, recognized as the longest shopping and dining strip in the Philippines. Its first phase opened on December 20, 2016, followed by a grand opening in January 2017. Additional phases were completed in 2018.

Landers Superstore is set to open a branch within Iloilo Business Park, bringing its membership-based wholesale retail format to the township.

=== Museums and art galleries ===
The Iloilo Museum of Contemporary Art (ILOMOCA) is the first contemporary and modern art museum in the Visayas and Mindanao, and the first museum developed by Megaworld in the Philippines. It features works by both local and international artists, including pieces by Salvador Dalí.

The Brandy Museum, the first and only brandy museum in the Philippines, offers an interactive virtual tour that highlights the history of brandy and wine production.

Science XPdition Iloilo, located on the third level of Festive Walk Mall, is a science-focused museum featuring more than 100 hands-on exhibits and activities across 10 themed laboratories. It is the township's third museum and the first in Iloilo City dedicated entirely to science and interactive learning.

=== Convention center ===
The Iloilo Convention Center stands on a 1.7-hectare site donated by Megaworld Corporation, formerly part of the apron and terminal area of the old Mandurriao Airport. Its construction was funded through the Tourism Infrastructure and Enterprise Zone Authority (TIEZA) and the Priority Development Assistance Fund (PDAF) allocated by Senator Franklin Drilon.

=== Medical services ===
SuperCare Medical Services, Inc. is a nine-storey medical facility currently under construction within the township.

== Transport ==
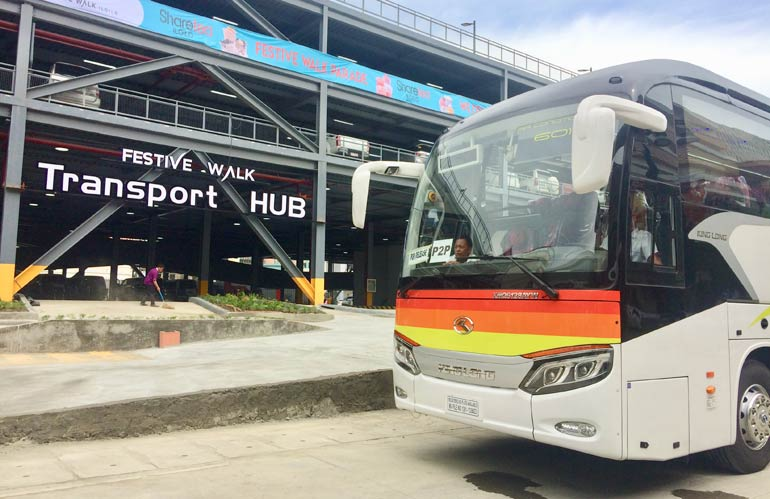
Festive Walk Transport Hub and the Premium Point-to-Point (P2P) Bus

Iloilo Business Park features two transport hubs, one dedicated to Premium Point-to-Point Bus Service, offering express routes to the airports in Cabatuan, Kalibo, and Boracay (Caticlan), and also servicing mini-buses, taxis, and jeepneys for routes within the metro area. The other transport hub is exclusively for vans traveling to destinations within and outside the metro area limits. Both hubs serve as central terminals in Iloilo City, after the closure of the Jaro Market transport hub that used to serve the ALEOSAN jeepneys.

A free shuttle bus service also operates along a fixed route within Iloilo Business Park, traveling north to south and vice versa along Megaworld Boulevard, while electric carts provide free-roaming transportation throughout the area.

== Gallery ==
Some landmarks in Iloilo Business Park

Iloilo Business Park aerial view

Festive Walk Clock Tower

Courtyard by Marriott Iloilo

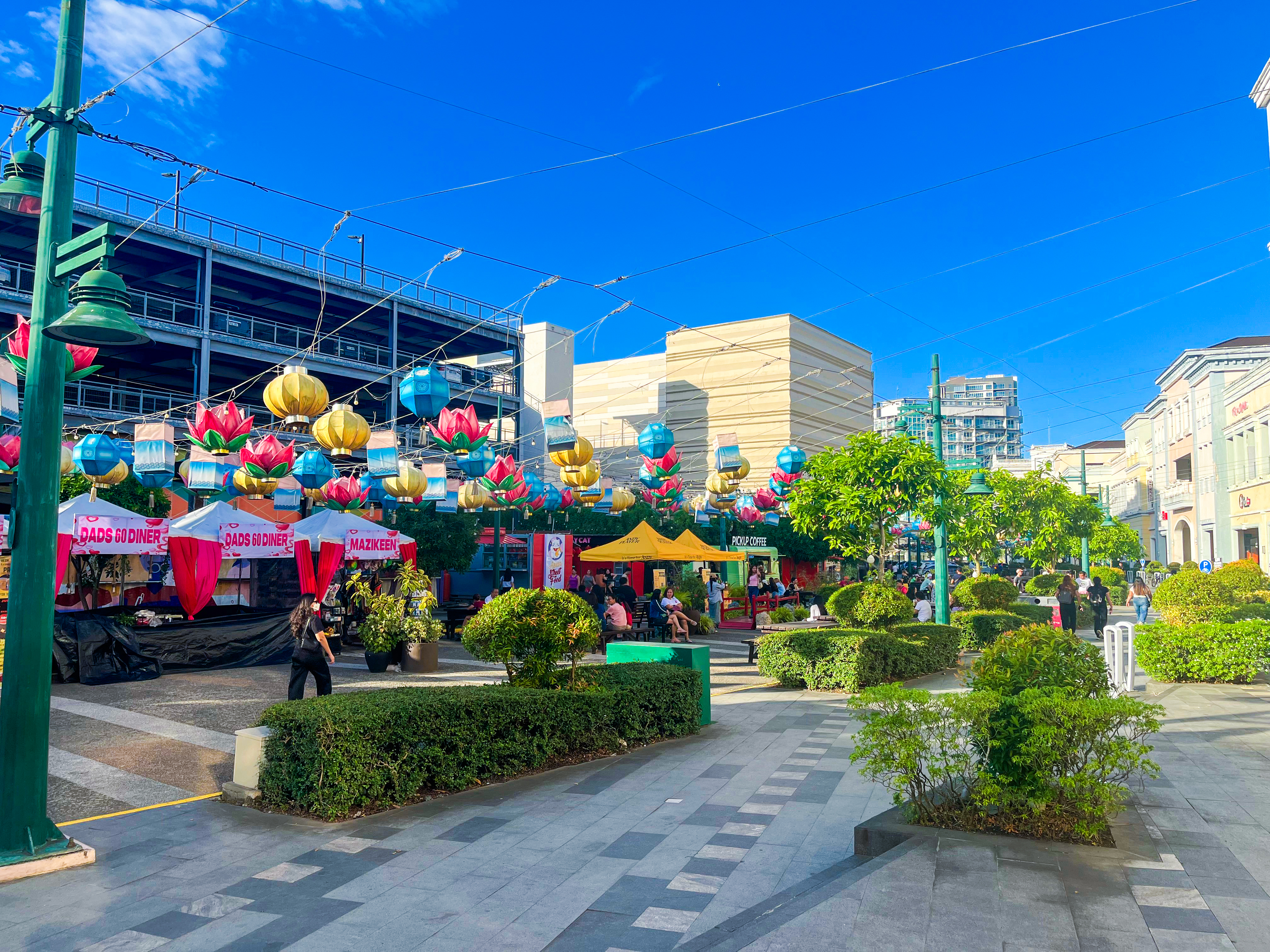
Iloilo K-Town (Koreatown)

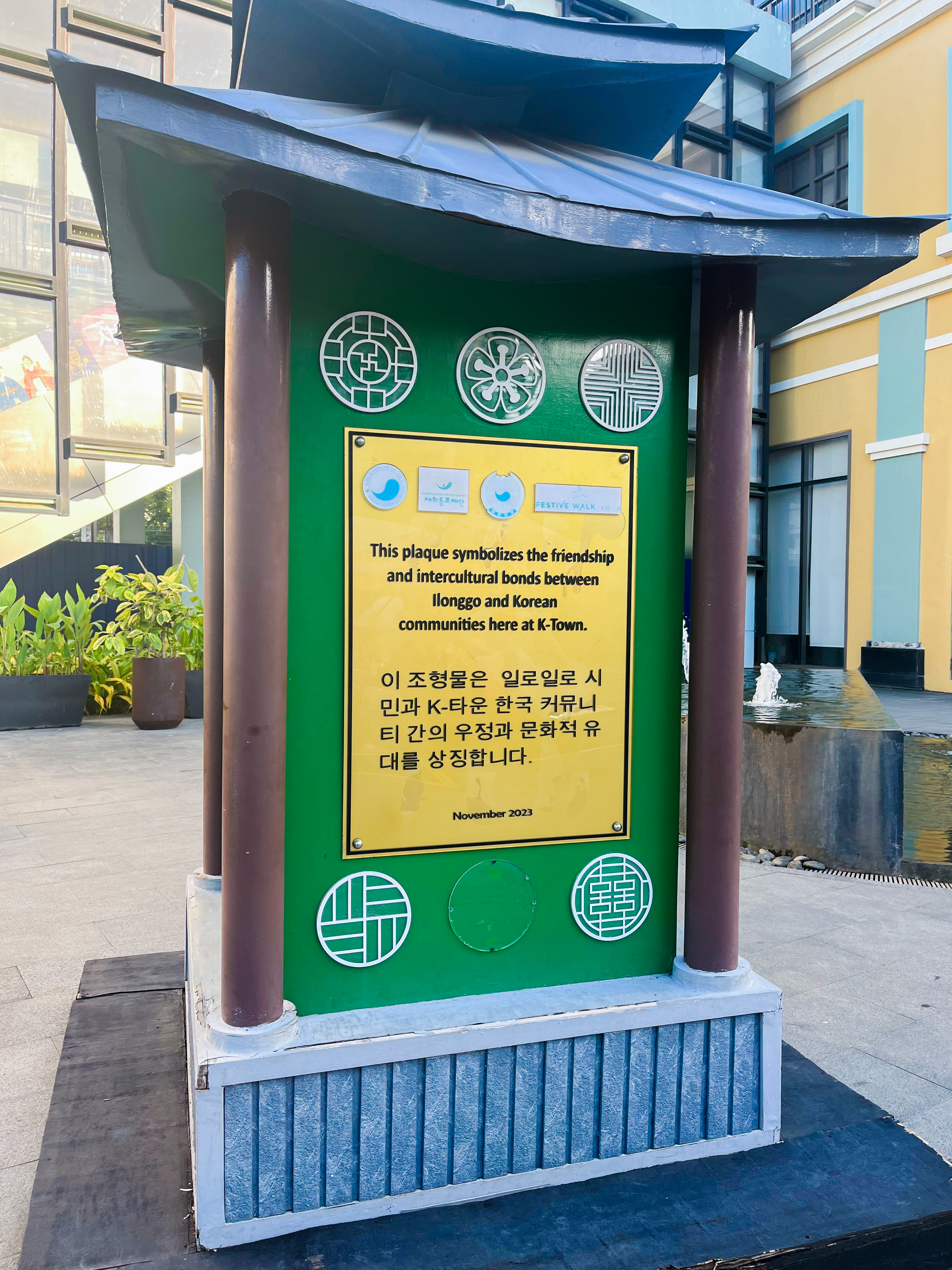
Ilonggo-Korean friendship marker

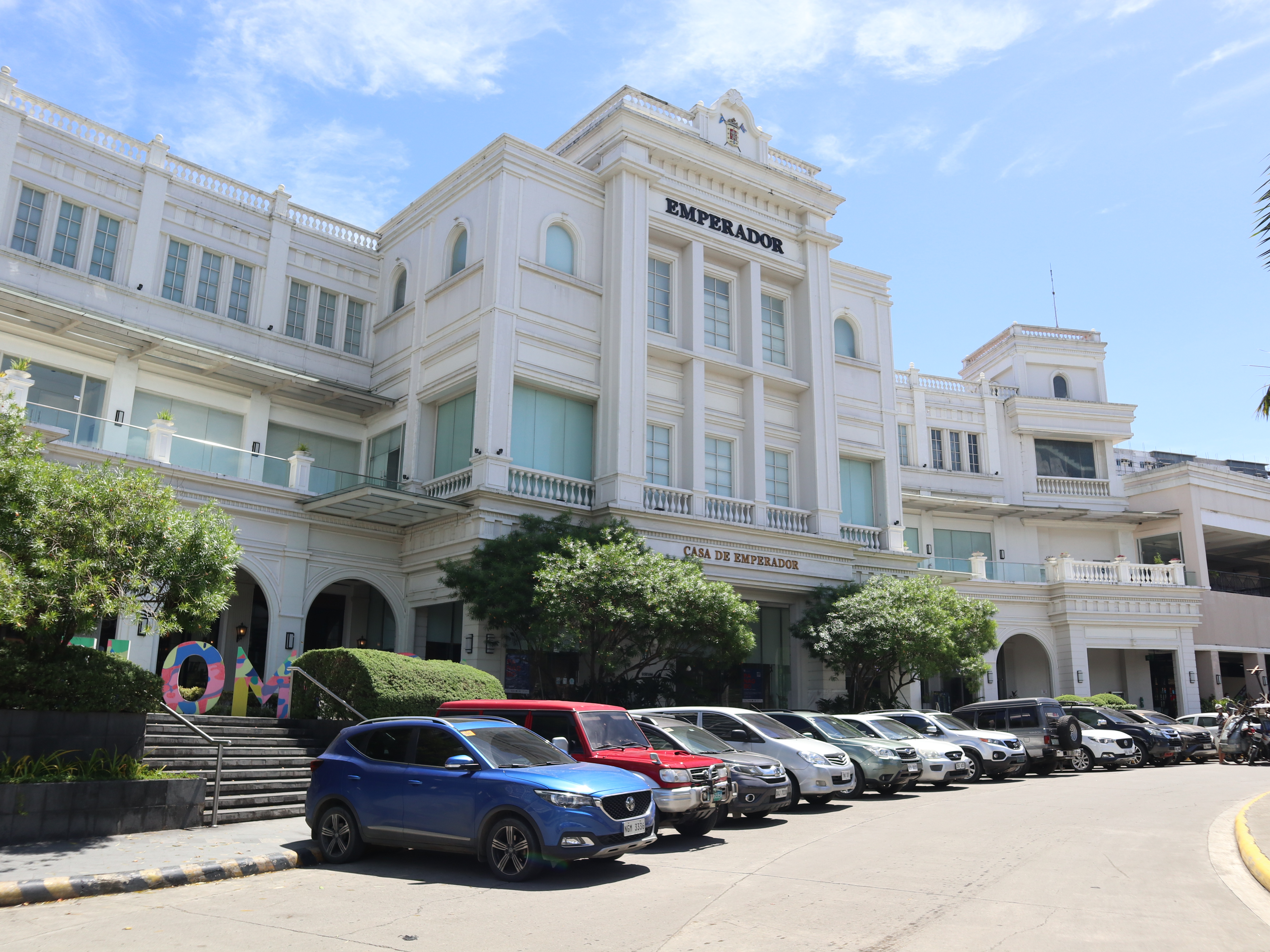
Casa de Emperador

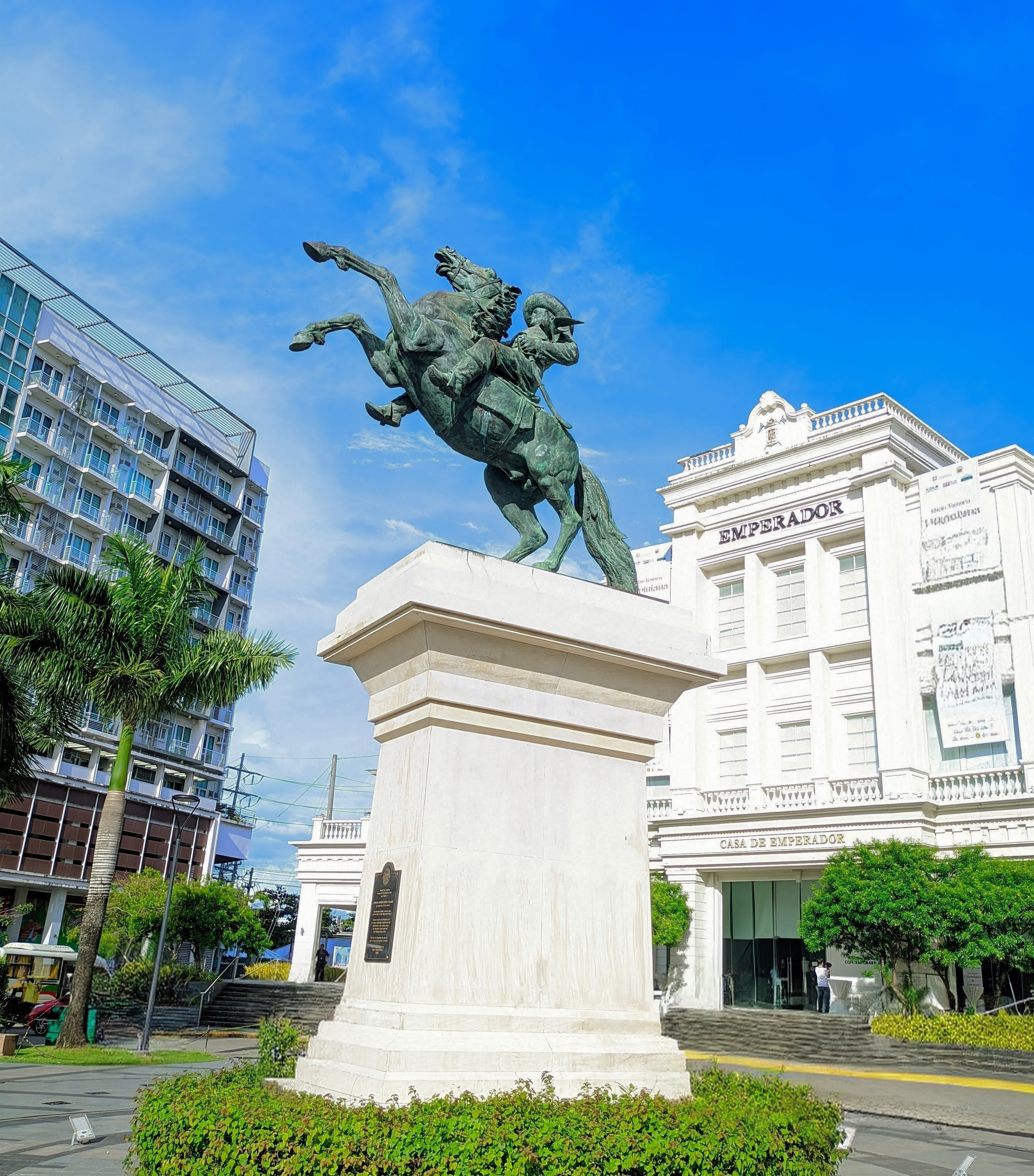
General Martin Delgado Monument
