= Iloilo Museum of Contemporary Art =

Art museum in Iloilo City, Philippines

- Iloilo Museum of Contemporary Art housed at the Casa de Emperador
- Established: March 17, 2018
- Location: Casa de Emperador, Iloilo Business Park, Mandurriao, Iloilo City, Philippines
- Coordinates: 10°43′05″N 122°32′54″E
- Type: Art museum
- Website: www.ilomoca.org

The Iloilo Museum of Contemporary Art (ILOMOCA) is an art museum in Iloilo City, Philippines. It is the first museum in the Visayas and Mindanao dedicated to modern art.

The museum is housed at the Casa de Emperador (Emperor's House) beside the Brandy Museum, the country's first brandy museum, by Emperador brandy in the real estate giant Megaworld's Iloilo Business Park township in Mandurriao, Iloilo City.

== History ==
Initiated by Megaworld Corporation through Megaworld Foundation, ILOMOCA was constructed in partnership with Ilonggo art collector Edwin Valencia.

Valencia, who started collecting art in the 1980s while he was working as an investment banker in New York, envisioned having a family museum that would not only house his collection but would also share them to the Ilonggo community. Realizing that building a large museum will be a major undertaking due to the growing size and scale of his collection, Valencia had an idea of partnering with an organization or a company that could build an infrastructure and house his collection.

In 2014, Valencia met with Kevin Tan, then-head of Megaworld Lifestyle Malls and now the CEO of Alliance Global Group Inc., the holding company of Megaworld Corp. Tan said the real estate company planned to build a museum in Manila but Valencia suggested Iloilo as the location, due to the province's thriving art community.

ILOMOCA opened on March 17, 2018, with the goal of enriching the community life of Iloilo province through exhibitions and outreach programs.

== Galleries and collections ==
The ₱109-million ILOMOCA spans 3,000 square meters of floor space, which includes three floors and five exhibit halls.

Its facade is adorned by an 8.8-meter bronze statue of Iloilo's revolutionary hero General Martin Delgado, the work of award-winning Spanish artist Ginés Serrán-Pagán. The sculpture depicts Delgado, who was the first Filipino governor of Iloilo province, riding a horse with his left hand holding a sword. Above Delgado's shoulder is a dove, which symbolizes Delgado's fight for freedom.

=== Hulot Exhibit ===
The ground floor houses The Hulot Exhibit, named after the Hiligaynon word for room or space. It is allocated for exhibitions of local and international artists and serves as a commercial space for guest artists to display and sell their works. Visitors can also find the museum shop, where they can buy souvenirs and special museum memorabilia.

=== The Gallery ===
The second floor contains The Gallery, which is devoted to rotating shows of various themes. It has three inaugural exhibitions: works by Filipino artists who identify themselves as Ilonggo and are recognized locally and abroad; pieces by foreign artists and a collection of sculptures.

==== Ilonggo Country gallery ====
The “Ilonggo Country” gallery, which features finest artists who have Ilonggo roots, seeks to showcase the diverse art community of the region. It emphasizes the lack of an “Ilonggo art” and instead curates “art conceived and realized by the many Ilonggo artists from everywhere who continue to contribute to the flourishing Philippine art.” Among the artists featured in the Ilonggo Country are Rock Drilon, Charlie Co, Nelfa Querubin and other emerging artists who have won national awards.

==== Foreign pieces ====
Meanwhile, Gallery 2 called “A Presence Beyond The Native,” showcases a collection of artworks by foreign artists. Masterworks of international artists such as Salvador Dalí, Marc Chagall, and Joan Miró are displayed in the gallery.

==== Sculptures ====
The third gallery houses sculptures to demonstrate the expansion of the traditional sculpture media to contemporary times through fabric, glass, steel, concrete, or resin. Among the works displayed in the gallery are glass sculptures by Ramon Orlina, a miniature of Michael Cacnio's UPlift sculpture, said to be the female version of the University of the Philippines’ iconic Oblation, and glass heads of Benedicto “BenCab” Cabrera.

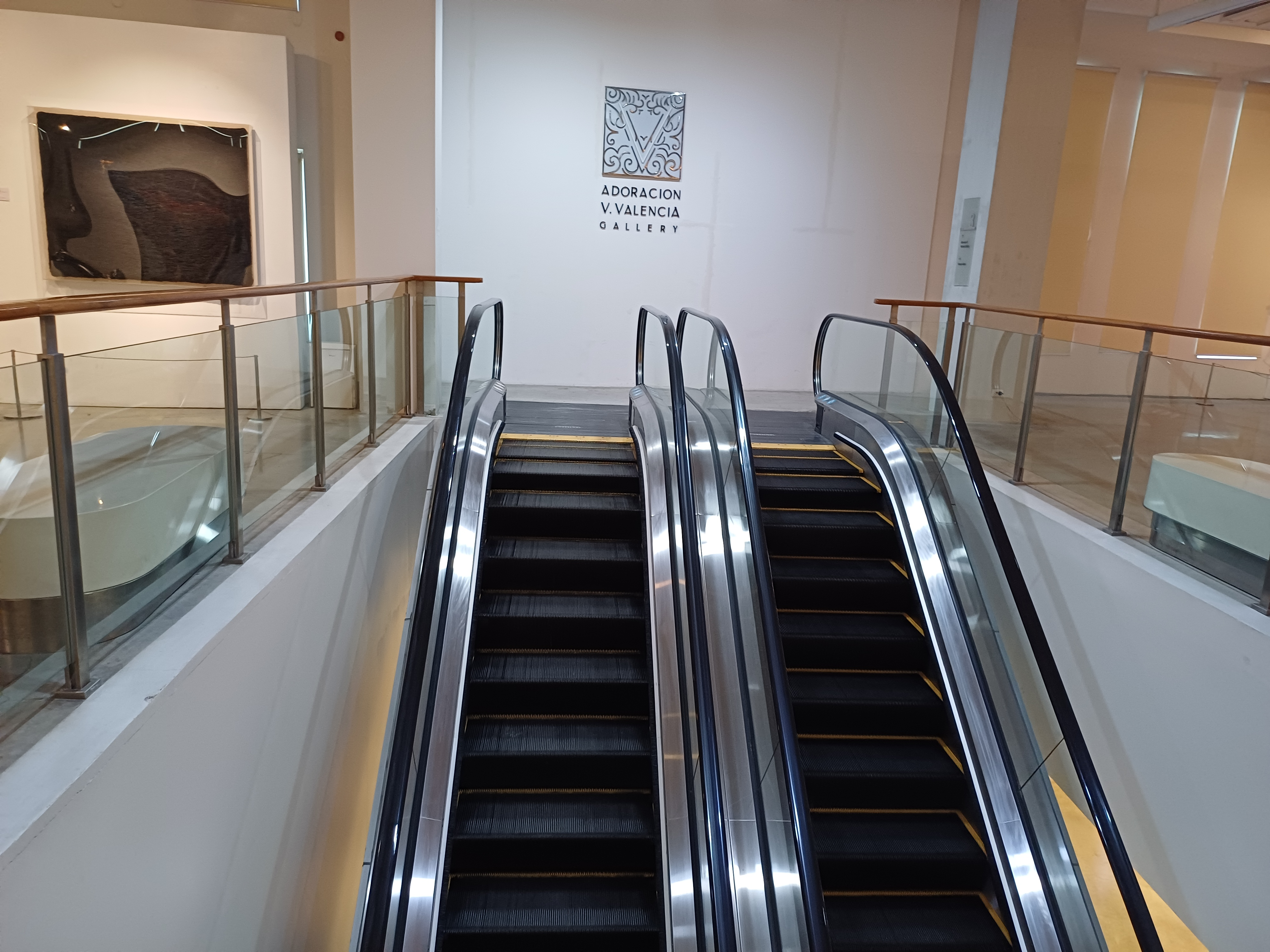
Adoracion Valencia Gallery

=== Adoracion Valencia Gallery ===
The third floor is named the Adoracion Valencia Gallery and showcases the personal collection of ILOMOCA's primary patron, Edwin Valencia. It is named after Valencia's mother who influenced his passion for the arts. It houses the collection of the Valencia family, including works from National Artists Arturo Luz and Ang Kiukok.

=== The Box ===
Aside from hosting exhibitions, ILOMOCA also has its own venue for hosting performance art, theater productions, workshops, and other cultural events. Called The Box, the theater is located on the second level of the museum and is equipped with state-of-the-art audio technology. It has a capacity of up to sixty people.
