= Mandurriao Airport =

Former airport of Iloilo, Philippines (1937–2007)

Mandurriao Airport Paliparan ng Mandurriao Hulugpaan sang Mandurriao
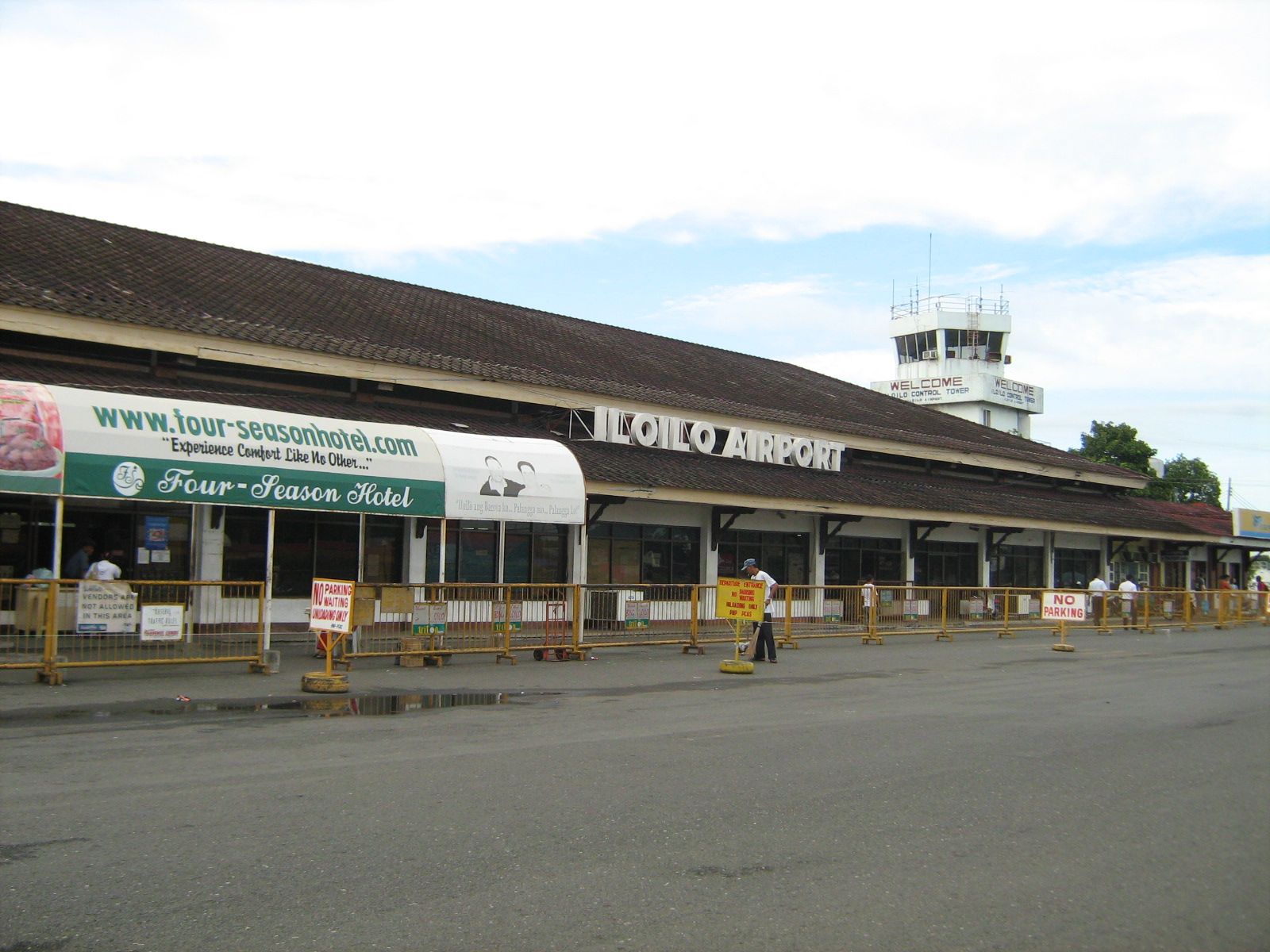
- Exterior of Mandurriao Airport
- IATA: ~~ILO~~; ICAO: ~~RPVI~~

Summary
- Airport type: Defunct
- Owner/Operator: Air Transportation Office
- Serves: Metro Iloilo–Guimaras
- Location: Mandurriao, Iloilo City, Iloilo, Philippines
- Opened: 1937
- Closed: June 14, 2007
- Elevation AMSL: 8 m (26 ft)
- Coordinates: 10°42′47.04″N 122°32′27.90″E
- Interactive map of Mandurriao Airport

Runways
Direction	Length		Surface
Direction	m	ft	Surface
02/20	2,100	6,890	Asphalt (Closed)

Mandurriao Airport (IATA: ~~ILO~~, ICAO: ~~RPVI~~), also known as Iloilo Airport during its operation, was an airport that served the area of Iloilo City and the province of Iloilo in the Philippines. The airport was located 5 kilometres (3.1 mi) northwest of downtown Iloilo City in the district of Mandurriao. It was the fourth-busiest airport overall and the busiest domestic airport in the Philippines, accommodating over 700,000 passengers and over 5,000 tons of cargo in 2005. During the construction of the new Iloilo International Airport, it was also known as Iloilo-Mandurriao Airport.

Having been in service since the 1930s, Mandurriao Airport has since been replaced by the Iloilo International Airport located in the municipality of Cabatuan, and was subsequently decommissioned on June 14, 2007. A sprawling business district, known as Iloilo Business Park occupies the former airport site.

== History ==
=== As a World War II airfield ===
Mandurriao Airport was built in 1937 and also served as a World War II airfield. By 1942, the airfield was captured by Japanese forces until the US Army recaptured it in 1945.

=== As a civilian airport ===
The year 1981 saw the arrival of Pope John Paul II to the province of Iloilo on one of his stops during his 1981 Philippines visit, with the airport being used to facilitate his landing. A 2,202-square-meter (23,700 sq ft) passenger terminal building was built in 1982.

However, in the 1990s, problems in Mandurriao Airport began to rise due to the liberalization of the Philippine aviation industry and the rise of air travel in the country. The increasing incidents of terrorism in the Philippines forced aviation officials to restrict airport access only to passengers, the sealing of doors and windows at airport terminals being an essential component thereof. However, the terminal's architecture, which took advantage of natural ventilation, had posed problems for passengers, causing six to twenty-three air-conditioning units to be installed. Another barrage of problems hit the airport, which included outdated facilities, more poor passenger comfort, and others. Passenger complaints also focused on having their baggage manually checked due to the updated machines being for the sole use of Philippine Airlines. The airport complex likewise was located directly alongside major city thoroughfares, in particular the city's main highway, the Tomás Confesor Highway, which complicated the flow of traffic in and around the area.

=== Closure and redevelopment ===
In 1995, a proposal of building a new airport outside of the city was announced, selecting Cabatuan as the new airport site in 1997. On June 13, 2007, at 6:20 pm PST, a Manila-bound Cebu Pacific Airbus A319 became the last commercial flight to depart the airport. The airport was formally decommissioned at 5:00 am PST the following day, coinciding with the simultaneous commissioning of the Iloilo International Airport.

The 54-hectare (130-acre) property was sold for bidding and redevelopment. After delays, Megaworld acquired the site for Php 1.2 billion (roughly $2.5 million) to be developed into a mixed-use residential and commercial complex, now known as the Iloilo Business Park.

Iloilo Convention Center, which occupies the former site of the airport's passenger terminal (demolished between 2012 and 2013), played host to the APEC Finance meetings in 2015.

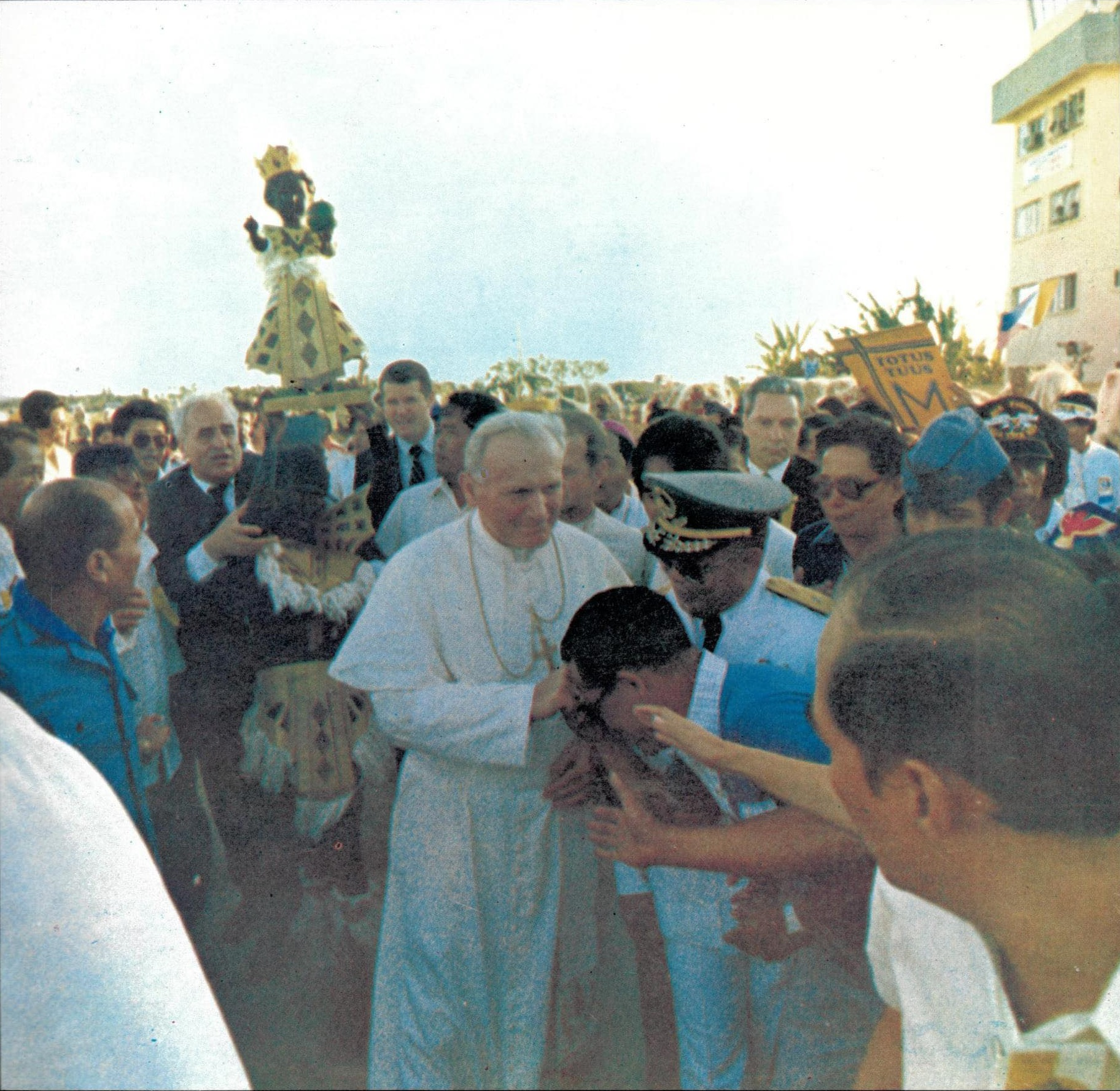
Pope John Paul II meets admirers at Mandurriao Airport in 1981. The tall building in the background is the airport's control tower, which served as a monument to the Pope until its demolition in 2021.

The former control tower of Mandurriao Airport remained standing for thirteen years after the airport's closure until its demolition in 2021. It used to serve as a monument to Iloilo's aviation history and Philippine aviation history and also acted as a homage to Pope John Paul II and his 1981 visit to the Philippines, which included Iloilo as a stop.

== Former airlines and destinations ==
Airlines	Destinations
Cebu Pacific	Cebu, Manila
PAL Express	Cebu, Manila
Philippine Airlines	Manila

== See also ==
- Iloilo International Airport
