= Districts of Iloilo City =

Conglomeration of former cities and towns

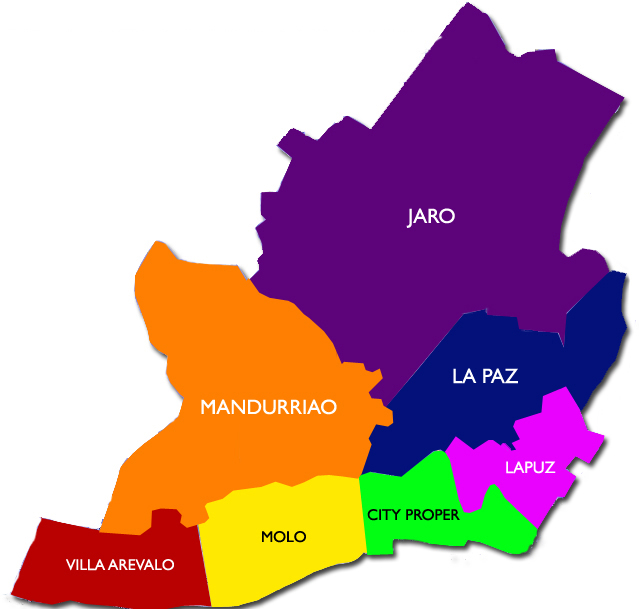
Villa de Arevalo Iloilo City Proper Jaro La Paz Lapuz Mandurriao Molo

The districts of Iloilo City are the seven geographical and administrative districts (boroughs) that comprise Iloilo City, Philippines. These are Arevalo, City Proper, Jaro, La Paz, Lapuz, Mandurriao, and Molo. All seven districts fall under the lone congressional district of Iloilo City and are further subdivided into barangays, totaling 180 barangays across the entire city.

== Background ==
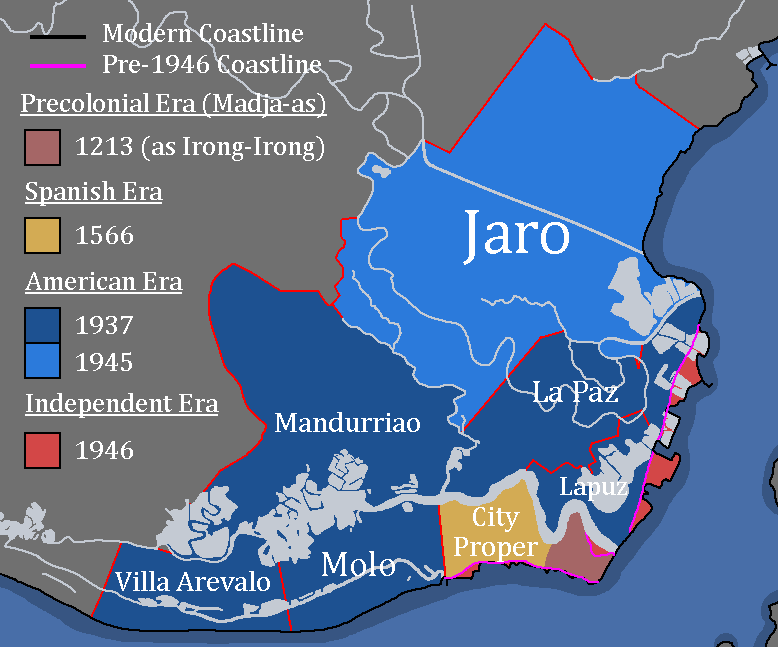
The territorial expansion of Iloilo City with its seven districts.

Arevalo was the first municipality in the area to be formally settled and established by the Spanish. It initially served as the capital of the province of Oton (now Iloilo province) before the seat of power was moved to a location near the mouth of the Iloilo River known as La Punta and later became Iloilo. The new capital gradually developed into a thriving business center and, by the 19th century, had emerged as a significant trading port. Iloilo gained cityhood on October 5, 1889, and as the city expanded, nearby municipalities were considered for incorporation.

Jaro officially became a city in 1891. In 1903, Jaro (including Leganes), La Paz, Mandurriao, and Molo were merged with the city of Iloilo. Pavia was also incorporated into Iloilo in 1905, but on February 15, 1908, both Jaro and Pavia were separated from Iloilo, with Pavia being re-established as part of Jaro. La Paz also regained its autonomy in 1920.

On July 16, 1937, Iloilo officially entered a new Commonwealth charter, which was formally inaugurated on August 25, 1937, resulting in a territorial expansion where the surrounding municipalities of Arevalo, La Paz, Mandurriao, and Molo were consolidated into the city. Jaro, following the separation of Leganes and Pavia in the 1920s, was formally absorbed into Iloilo City on January 16, 1941.

On December 17, 2008, Lapuz, which had been a sub-district of La Paz since the Spanish colonial period, was officially separated and recognized as Iloilo City’s seventh and newest district. For several years prior to its formal separation, Lapuz had already functioned as a de facto district, even having its own district president, similar to the other districts of the city.

== Description and list of barangays ==
Iloilo City has a total of 180 barangays throughout its seven districts.

=== Iloilo City Proper ===
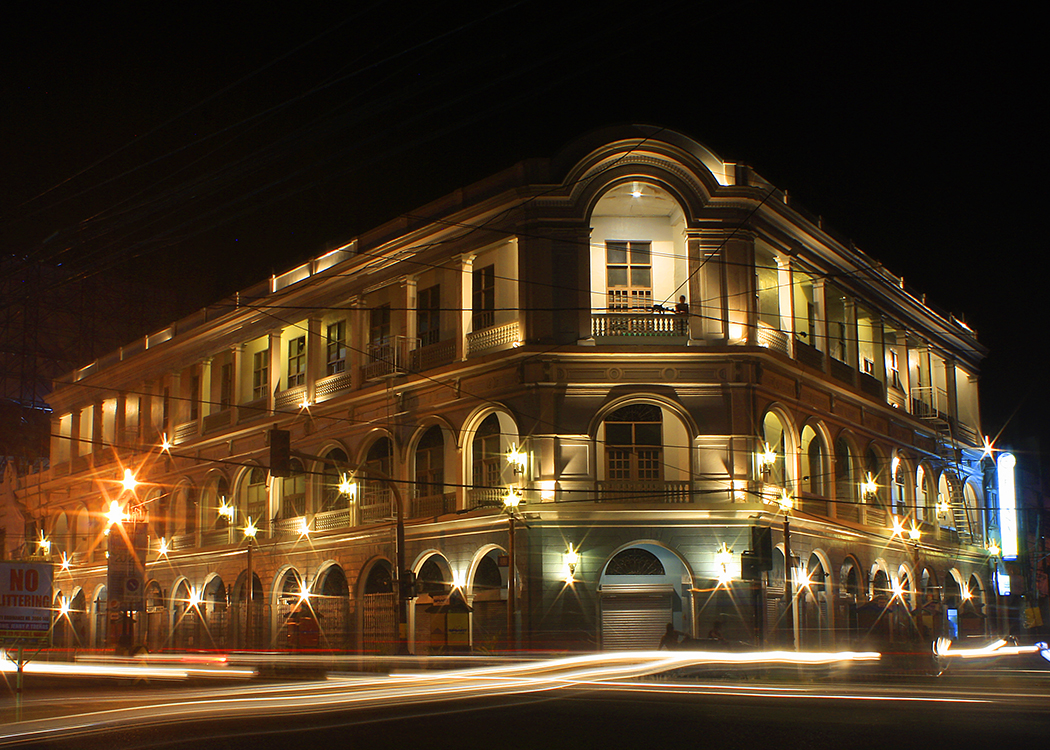
The Villanueva Building on Calle Real in the City Proper district, the downtown area of Iloilo City

City Proper is the second-most densely populated district and is considered the heart of Iloilo City. It serves as the civic center, housing the offices of both the city and provincial governments, as well as various local and regional government agencies for the Western Visayas. For much of Iloilo's history, economic activity was centered in this district. However, in recent years, development has gradually shifted toward Mandurriao and Jaro, mainly due to limited space for new infrastructure in the old downtown area.

The district is also known for its well-preserved commercial buildings from the late 19th to early 20th century, such as the Eusebio Villanueva Building, Javellana Building, and the Aduana Building, which can be found along many of its historic streets.

City Proper has the most barangays among all the districts, with a total of 45, and has a population density of around 13,000 people per square kilometer, making it one of the most densely populated areas in the city.

Barangays	Population (2024)	Area		Density	
	Population (2024)	km^{2}	sq mi	/km^{2}	/sq mi
Arsenal Aduana	177	0.08	0.031	2,200	5,700
Baybay Tanza	2,108	0.25	0.097	8,400	22,000
Bonifacio Tanza	2,916	0.04	0.015	73,000	190,000
Concepcion-Montes	2,455	0.22	0.085	11,000	28,000
Danao	305	0.20	0.077	1,500	3,900
Delgado-Jalandoni-Bagumbayan	209	0.02	0.0077	10,000	26,000
Edganzon	383	0.10	0.039	3,800	9,800
Flores	143	0.04	0.015	3,600	9,300
General Hughes-Montes	1,943	0.09	0.035	22,000	57,000
Gloria	149	0.02	0.0077	7,500	19,000
Hipodromo	683	0.05	0.019	14,000	36,000
Inday	308	0.15	0.058	2,100	5,400
Jalandoni-Wilson	799	0.06	0.023	13,000	34,000
Kahirupan	456	0.03	0.012	15,000	39,000
Kauswagan	354	0.04	0.015	8,900	23,000
Legaspi dela Rama	635	0.12	0.046	5,300	14,000
Liberation	315	0.05	0.019	6,300	16,000
Mabolo-Delgado	1,130	0.05	0.019	23,000	60,000
Magsaysay	337	0.07	0.027	4,800	12,000
Malipayon-Delgado	785	0.02	0.0077	39,000	100,000
Maria Clara	589	0.06	0.023	9,800	25,000
Monica Blumentritt	1,380	0.06	0.023	23,000	60,000
Muelle Loney-Montes	1,109	0.09	0.035	12,000	31,000
Nonoy	404	0.08	0.031	5,100	13,000
Ortiz	1,281	0.10	0.039	13,000	34,000
Osmeña	111	0.03	0.012	3,700	9,600
President Roxas	179	0.20	0.077	900	2,300
Rima-Rizal	623	0.01	0.0039	62,000	160,000
Rizal Estanzuela	3,351	0.04	0.015	84,000	220,000
Rizal Ibarra	534	0.03	0.012	18,000	47,000
Rizal Palapala I	1,620	0.02	0.0077	81,000	210,000
Rizal Palapala II	2,245	0.03	0.012	75,000	190,000
Roxas Village	43	0.04	0.015	1,100	2,800
Sampaguita	410	0.13	0.050	3,200	8,300
San Agustin	687	0.19	0.073	3,600	9,300
San Felix	1,033	0.10	0.039	10,000	26,000
San Jose	382	0.03	0.012	13,000	34,000
Santo Rosario-Duran	1,665	0.11	0.042	15,000	39,000
Tanza-Esperanza	1,733	0.06	0.023	29,000	75,000
Timawa Tanza I	461	0.02	0.0077	23,000	60,000
Timawa Tanza II	1,564	0.04	0.015	39,000	100,000
Veterans Village	5,396	0.23	0.089	23,000	60,000
Villa Anita	906	0.12	0.046	7,600	20,000
Yulo-Arroyo	158	0.04	0.015	4,000	10,000
Zamora-Melliza	2,777	0.15	0.058	19,000	49,000
Iloilo City Proper	47,231	3.75	1.45	13,000	33,000
Source: Philippine Statistics Authority – Philippine Standard Geographic Code – Iloilo City – Barangays

=== La Paz ===
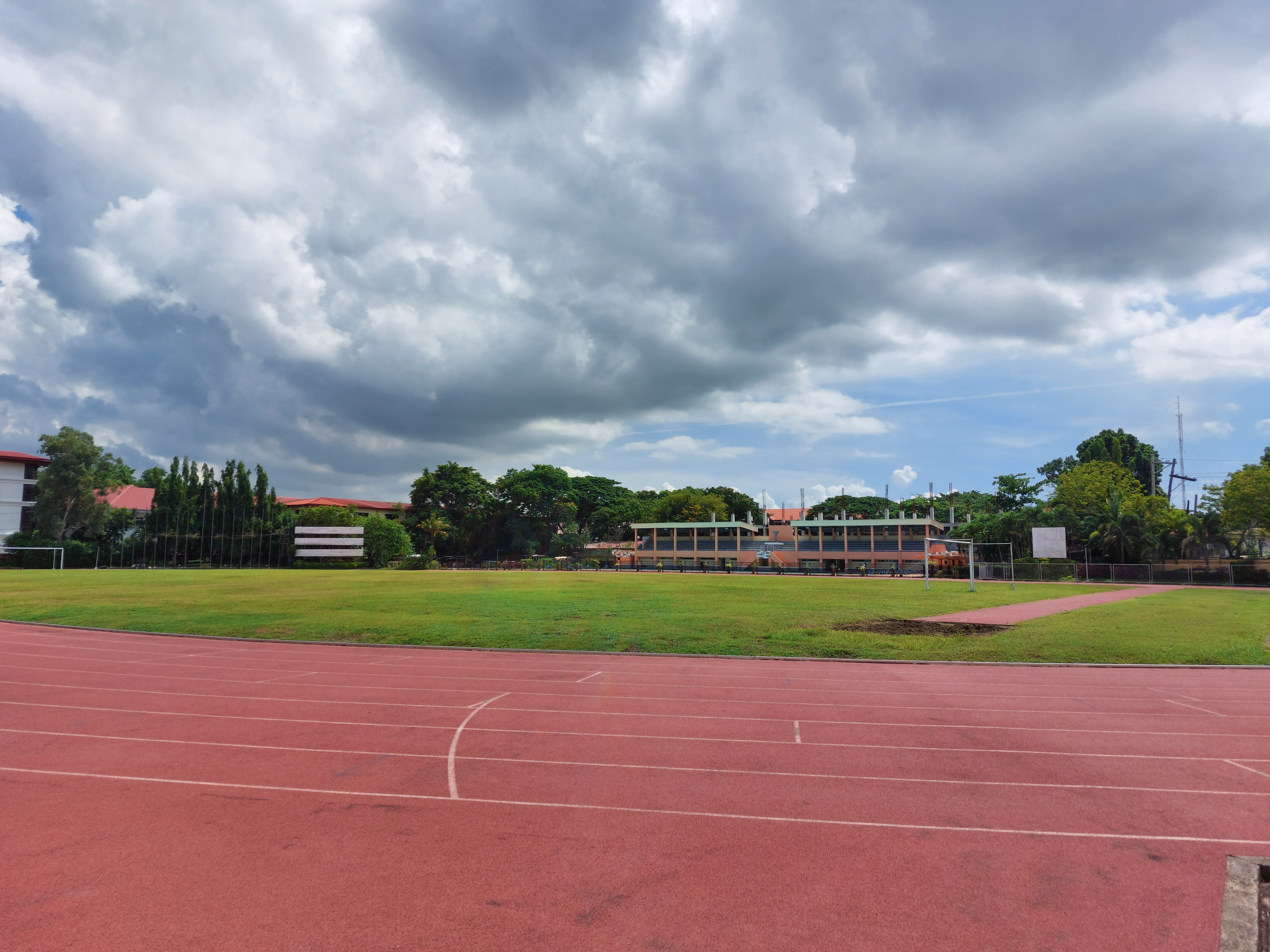
Iloilo Sports Complex in La Paz, the third largest district in Iloilo City

La Paz is the third-largest district in Iloilo City by land area. It is known as the birthplace of the Filipino noodle soup dish, La Paz Batchoy. The La Paz Plaza is the largest public plaza in the city. It is home to several educational institutions, including West Visayas State University, Iloilo Science and Technology University, Western Institute of Technology, St. Therese – MTC Colleges, and Hua Siong College of Iloilo (Satellite Campus).

La Paz has a total of 25 barangays.

Barangays	Population (2024)	Area		Density	
Barangays	Population (2024)	km^{2}	sq mi	/km^{2}	/sq mi
Aguinaldo	1,523	0.07	0.027	22,000	57,000
Baldoza	6,255	0.32	0.12	20,000	52,000
Bantud	575	0.13	0.050	4,400	11,000
Banuyao	1,489	0.56	0.22	2,700	7,000
Burgos-Mabini-Plaza	1,763	0.24	0.093	7,300	19,000
Caingin	4,695	0.24	0.093	20,000	52,000
Divinagracia	998	0.09	0.035	11,000	28,000
Gustilo	2,510	0.11	0.042	23,000	60,000
Hinactacan	737	1.98	0.76	370	960
Ingore	4,640	2.83	1.09	1,600	4,100
Jereos	3,672	0.18	0.069	20,000	52,000
Laguda	318	0.05	0.019	6,400	17,000
Lopez Jaena Norte	1,879	0.11	0.042	17,000	44,000
Lopez Jaena Sur	2,242	0.23	0.089	9,700	25,000
Luna	578	0.11	0.042	5,300	14,000
MacArthur	640	0.04	0.015	16,000	41,000
Magdalo	984	0.10	0.039	9,800	25,000
Magsaysay Village	1,183	0.30	0.12	3,900	10,000
Nabitasan	3,574	0.80	0.31	4,500	12,000
Railway	1,334	0.07	0.027	19,000	49,000
Rizal	1,978	0.08	0.031	25,000	65,000
San Isidro	4,363	0.43	0.17	10,000	26,000
San Nicolas	1,212	0.15	0.058	8,100	21,000
Tabuc Suba	4,650	0.94	0.36	4,900	13,000
Ticud	4,306	1.17	0.45	3,700	9,600
District of La Paz	58,098	11.33	4.37	5,100	13,000
Source: Philippine Statistics Authority - Philippine Standard Geographic Code - Iloilo City - Barangays

=== Jaro ===
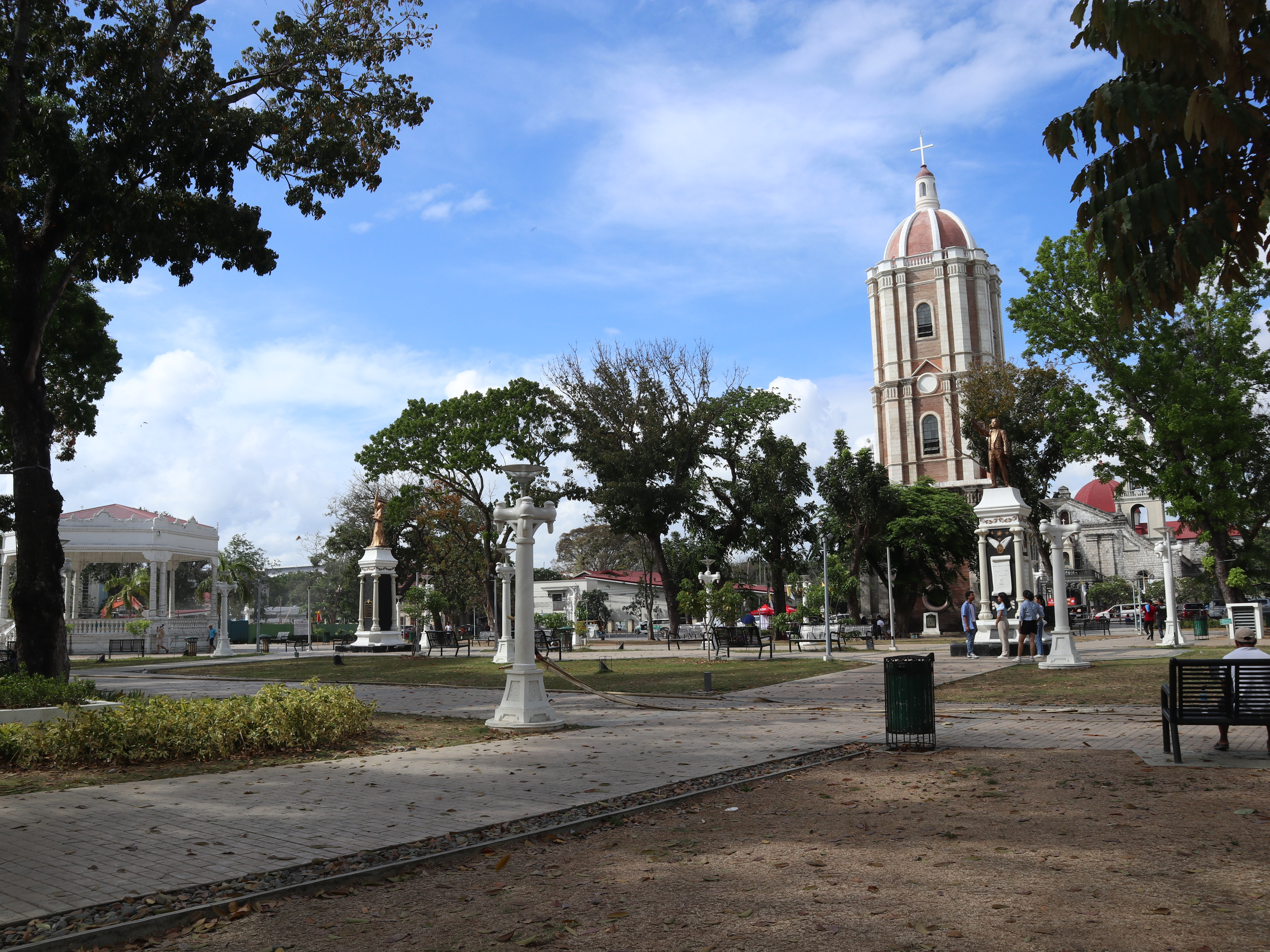
Graciano Lopez Jaena Park in Jaro, the city's largest district by both geographical area and population

Jaro is the largest and most populous district of Iloilo City, accounting for 35% of the city's total land area and 29% of its population. It is considered the center of faith in Western Visayas, being home to the Jaro Metropolitan Cathedral, the seat of the Roman Catholic Archdiocese of Jaro, which covers Iloilo, Antique, Guimaras, and Negros Occidental.

As a former city with a significant Spanish Filipino population, Jaro features many old mansions and heritage houses, such as the Lopez Mansion, Lizares Mansion, Ledesma Mansion, and Casa Mariquit. It is also home to Central Philippine University, the first university in Western Visayas to be ranked among Asia’s and the world’s best universities by Quacquarelli Symonds.

The district of Jaro has a total of 42 barangays.

Barangays	Population (2024)	Area		Density	
Barangays	Population (2024)	km^{2}	sq mi	/km^{2}	/sq mi
Arguelles	688	0.12	0.046	5,700	15,000
Balabago	10,441	2.43	0.94	4,300	11,000
Balantang	4,762	1.96	0.76	2,400	6,200
Benedicto	2,954	0.17	0.066	17,000	44,000
Bito-on	7,026	1.61	0.62	4,400	11,000
Buhang	3,930	1.40	0.54	2,800	7,300
Buntatala	4,558	1.51	0.58	3,000	7,800
Calubihan	925	0.03	0.012	31,000	80,000
Camalig	2,679	0.56	0.22	4,800	12,000
Claudio Castilla El-98	116	0.02	0.0077	5,800	15,000
Cuartero	2,160	0.27	0.10	8,000	21,000
Cubay	7,004	1.05	0.41	6,700	17,000
Democracia	1,373	0.07	0.027	20,000	52,000
Desamparados	423	0.03	0.012	14,000	36,000
Dungon A	1,120	0.21	0.081	5,300	14,000
Dungon B	3,076	0.53	0.20	5,800	15,000
Fajardo	1,205	0.06	0.023	20,000	52,000
Javellana	545	0.03	0.012	18,000	47,000
Lanit	8,346	2.45	0.95	3,400	8,800
Libertad Santa Isabel	346	0.05	0.019	6,900	18,000
Lopez Jaena	713	0.05	0.019	14,000	36,000
Luna	193	0.04	0.015	4,800	12,000
M.H. del Pilar	3,896	0.30	0.12	13,000	34,000
M.V. Hechanova	4,182	0.83	0.32	5,000	13,000
Ma. Cristina	673	0.06	0.023	11,000	28,000
Montinola	829	0.13	0.050	6,400	17,000
Our Lady of Fatima	1,630	0.19	0.073	8,600	22,000
Our Lady of Lourdes	2,567	0.23	0.089	11,000	28,000
Quintin Salas	5,267	0.82	0.32	6,400	17,000
Sambag	5,876	1.27	0.49	4,600	12,000
San Isidro	12,603	1.51	0.58	8,300	21,000
San Jose	398	0.04	0.015	10,000	26,000
San Pedro	1,147	0.06	0.023	19,000	49,000
San Roque	1,567	0.05	0.019	31,000	80,000
San Vicente	1,056	0.13	0.050	8,100	21,000
Seminario	294	0.05	0.019	5,900	15,000
Simon Ledesma	2,220	0.06	0.023	37,000	96,000
Tabuc Suba	10,933	1.30	0.50	8,400	22,000
Tacas	6,892	3.65	1.41	1,900	4,900
Tagbac	5,329	1.37	0.53	3,900	10,000
Taytay Zone II	1,009	0.06	0.023	17,000	44,000
Ungka	3,323	0.74	0.29	4,500	12,000
District of Jaro	136,274	27.48	10.61	5,000	13,000
Source: Philippine Statistics Authority – Philippine Standard Geographic Code – Iloilo City – Barangays

=== Molo ===
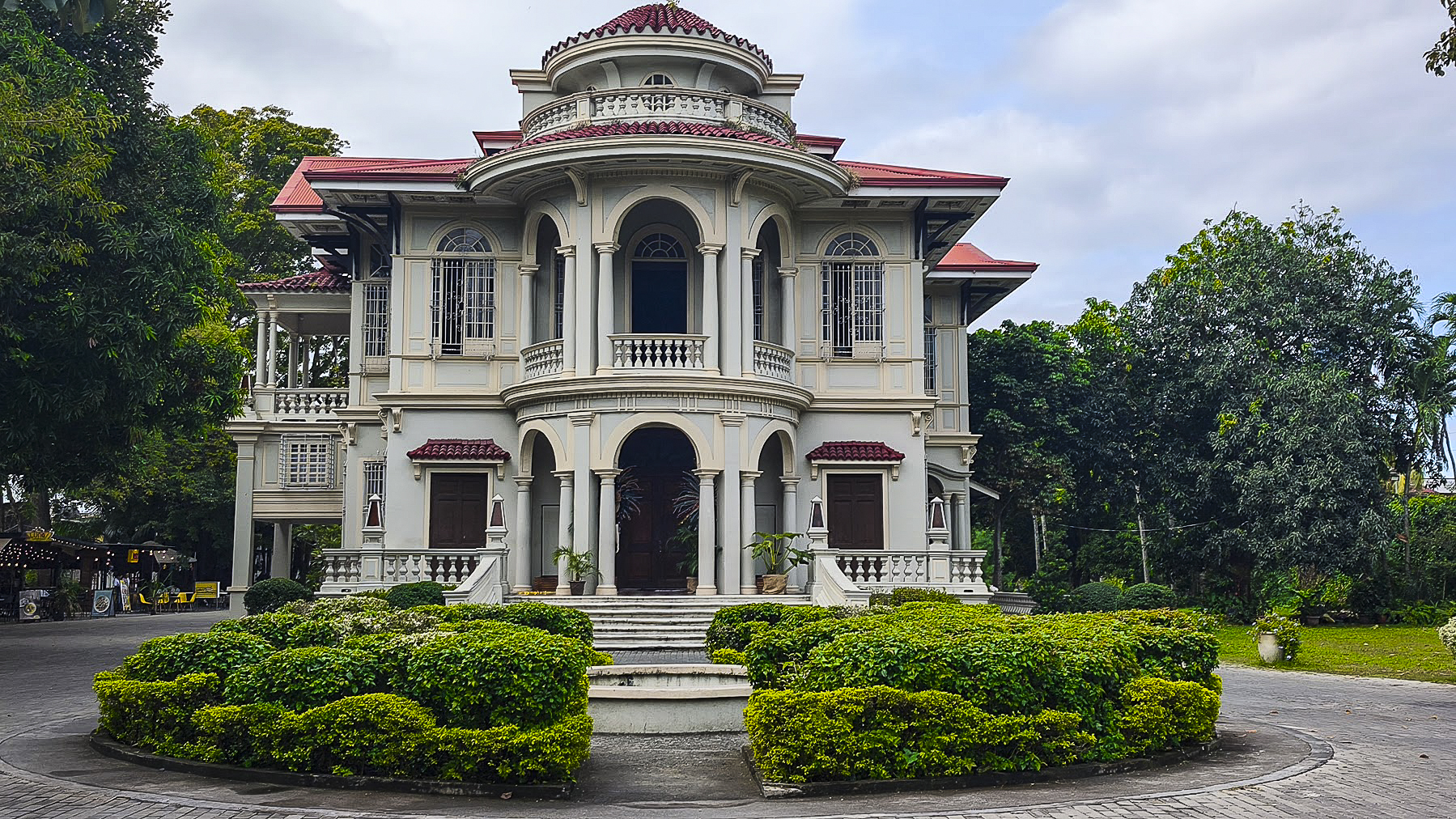
Molo Mansion in Molo, the city's most densely populated district

Molo is the most densely populated district in Iloilo City, with a population density of 14,000 people per square kilometer, and is the second-most populated district overall. It is known for the gothic-renaissance Molo Church and several heritage houses, including the Yusay-Consing Mansion, popularly known as the Molo Mansion.

The district is the origin of Pancit Molo, a pork dumpling soup made with wonton wrappers. Historically, Molo was recognized as the Chinese district of Iloilo, where many Chinese Filipino residents lived. It is also referred to as the "Athens of the Philippines" for being the birthplace of several prominent Filipino philosophers and political leaders.

Molo is composed of 25 barangays. The barangay of Calumpang is the most populous in Iloilo City, with a population of 15,568 (2024 census).

Barangays	Population (2024)	Area		Density	
	Population (2024)	km^{2}	sq mi	/km^{2}	/sq mi
Calumpang	15,568	0.88	0.34	18,000	47,000
Cochero	806	0.06	0.023	13,000	34,000
Compania	3,312	0.22	0.085	15,000	39,000
East Baluarte	1,819	0.09	0.035	20,000	52,000
East Timawa	775	0.06	0.023	13,000	34,000
Habog-Habog Salvacion	2,193	0.13	0.050	17,000	44,000
Infante	1,726	0.09	0.035	19,000	49,000
Kasingkasing	2,365	0.08	0.031	30,000	78,000
Katilingban	927	0.05	0.019	19,000	49,000
Molo Boulevard	8,357	0.24	0.093	35,000	91,000
North Avanceña	594	0.10	0.039	5,900	15,000
North Baluarte	4,907	0.13	0.050	38,000	98,000
North Fundidor	2,907	0.70	0.27	4,200	11,000
North San Jose	1,179	0.14	0.054	8,400	22,000
Poblacion	736	0.07	0.027	11,000	28,000
San Antonio	2,477	0.22	0.085	11,000	28,000
San Juan	11,091	0.32	0.12	35,000	91,000
San Pedro	3,230	0.25	0.097	13,000	34,000
South Baluarte	1,524	0.10	0.039	15,000	39,000
South Fundidor	3,319	0.79	0.31	4,200	11,000
South San Jose	1,811	0.27	0.10	6,700	17,000
Taal	1,425	0.33	0.13	4,300	11,000
Tap-oc	380	0.06	0.023	6,300	16,000
West Habog-Habog	1,314	0.07	0.027	19,000	49,000
West Timawa	2,051	0.11	0.042	19,000	49,000
District of Molo	76,793	5.54	2.14	14,000	36,000
Source: Philippine Statistics Authority - Philippine Standard Geographic Code - Iloilo City - Barangays

=== Mandurriao ===
Iloilo Convention Center in Mandurriao, the city's most modern and commercially developed district

Mandurriao is the second-largest district in Iloilo City by land area and the third-most populous. It is known for its modern, large-scale mixed-use developments, such as Iloilo Business Park, Atria Park District, SM Iloilo Complex, and Smallville Business Complex, where many of the city’s high-rise buildings are located. The district is also home to numerous upscale restaurants, bars, nightclubs, hotels, condominiums, and business process outsourcing (BPO) offices. It houses SM City Iloilo, the largest mall in the city.

Mandurriao is divided into 18 barangays.

Barangays	Population (2024)	Area		Density	
	Population (2024)	km^{2}	sq mi	/km^{2}	/sq mi
Abeto Mirasol Taft South (Quirino Abeto)	2,068	0.54	0.21	3,800	9,800
Airport (Tabucan Airport)	5,190	1.01	0.39	5,100	13,000
Bakhaw	6,107	0.25	0.097	24,000	62,000
Bolilao	6,365	0.35	0.14	18,000	47,000
Buhang Taft North	2,236	0.33	0.13	6,800	18,000
Calahunan	5,659	1.65	0.64	3,400	8,800
Dungon	3,865	0.95	0.37	4,100	11,000
Guzman-Jesena	5,641	0.89	0.34	6,300	16,000
Hibao-an Norte	2,167	0.88	0.34	2,500	6,500
Hibao-an Sur	5,281	2.16	0.83	2,400	6,200
Navais	4,725	1.24	0.48	3,800	9,800
Oñate de Leon	5,092	0.51	0.20	10,000	26,000
Pale Benedicto Rizal	3,151	0.35	0.14	9,000	23,000
PHHC Block 17	1,787	0.14	0.054	13,000	34,000
PHHC Block 22 NHA	1,369	0.20	0.077	6,800	18,000
San Rafael	2,424	1.59	0.61	1,500	3,900
Santa Rosa	1,001	0.38	0.15	2,600	6,700
Tabucan	2,336	0.35	0.14	6,700	17,000
District of Mandurriao	66,464	13.78	5.32	4,800	12,000
Source: Philippine Statistics Authority – Philippine Standard Geographic Code – Iloilo City – Barangays

=== Villa de Arevalo ===
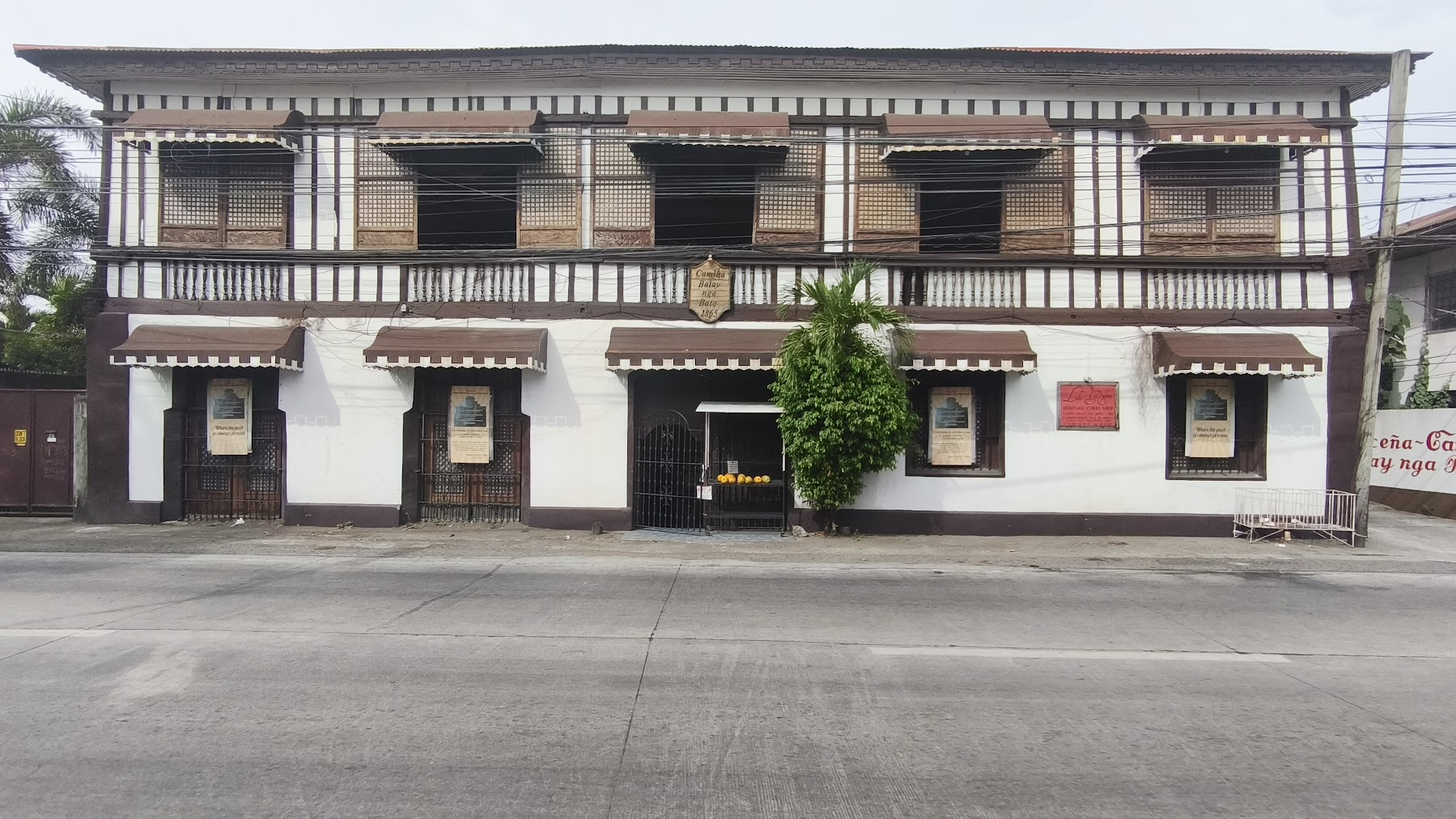
Camiña Balay Nga Bato in Arevalo, the westernmost district of Iloilo City

Arevalo is the westernmost and farthest district from Iloilo City Proper. It is well-known for its seafood restaurants along the shores of Villa Beach, which annually hosts the Paraw Regatta Festival. The district’s parish, the Archdiocesan Shrine of Santo Niño de Arevalo, houses the Santo Niño de Arévalo, the third-oldest Santo Niño figure in the Philippines. Arevalo is also home to the Camiña Balay nga Bato, a heritage house and restaurant built in 1865.

The district of Arevalo is composed of 13 barangays.

Barangays	Population (2024)	Area		Density	
	Population (2024)	km^{2}	sq mi	/km^{2}	/sq mi
Bonifacio	2,023	0.37	0.14	5,500	14,000
Calaparan	9,242	0.33	0.13	28,000	73,000
Dulonan	4,849	0.69	0.27	7,000	18,000
Mohon	1,320	0.15	0.058	8,800	23,000
Quezon	1,742	0.16	0.062	11,000	28,000
San José	2,218	0.62	0.24	3,600	9,300
Santa Cruz	4,019	0.56	0.22	7,200	19,000
Santa Filomina	2,823	0.35	0.14	8,100	21,000
Santo Domingo	2,494	0.41	0.16	6,100	16,000
Santo Niño Norte	4,342	0.20	0.077	22,000	57,000
Santo Niño Sur	9,266	0.98	0.38	9,500	25,000
Sooc	8,877	2.26	0.87	3,900	10,000
Yulo Drive	4,050	0.51	0.20	7,900	20,000
District of Arevalo	57,265	7.58	2.93	7,600	20,000
Source: Philippine Statistics Authority - Philippine Standard Geographic Code - Iloilo City - Barangays

=== Lapuz ===
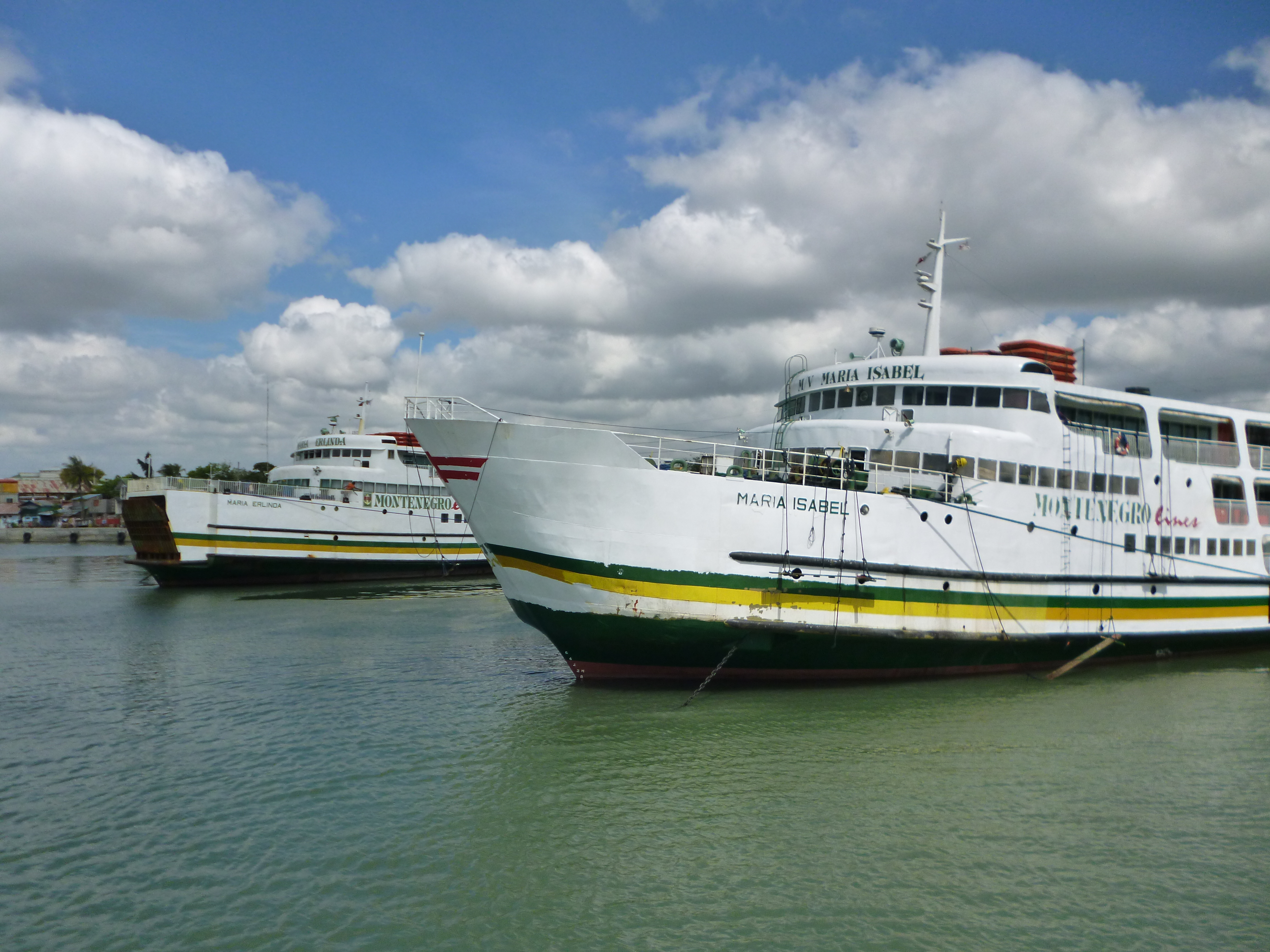
Ferry port in Lapuz, the smallest and least populous district in the city

Lapuz is the smallest district in Iloilo City in terms of land area and population. It is considered the gateway to the city, as it is home to key transport hubs including the Iloilo International Port, the Iloilo Ro-Ro (roll-on, roll-off) Port, and the Iloilo Fastcraft Terminal.

The district of Lapuz is composed of 12 barangays.

Barangays	Population (2024)	Area		Density	
Barangays	Population (2024)	km^{2}	sq mi	/km^{2}	/sq mi
Alalasan	2,893	0.07	0.027	41,000	110,000
Bo. Obrero	6,892	0.31	0.12	22,000	57,000
Don Esteban	3,501	0.25	0.097	14,000	36,000
Jalandoni Estate	1,847	0.13	0.050	14,000	36,000
Lapuz Norte	2,570	0.35	0.14	7,300	19,000
Lapuz Sur	1,468	0.12	0.046	12,000	31,000
Libertad	780	0.04	0.015	20,000	52,000
Loboc	2,564	1.40	0.54	1,800	4,700
Mansaya	3,374	0.16	0.062	21,000	54,000
Progreso	1,310	0.27	0.10	4,900	13,000
Punong	1,514	0.05	0.019	30,000	78,000
Sinikway	2,890	0.08	0.031	36,000	93,000
District of Lapuz	31,603	3.25	1.25	9,700	25,000
Source: Philippine Statistics Authority - Philippine Standard Geographic Code - Iloilo City - Barangays
