= Terranza Residences Iloilo =

Terranza Residences
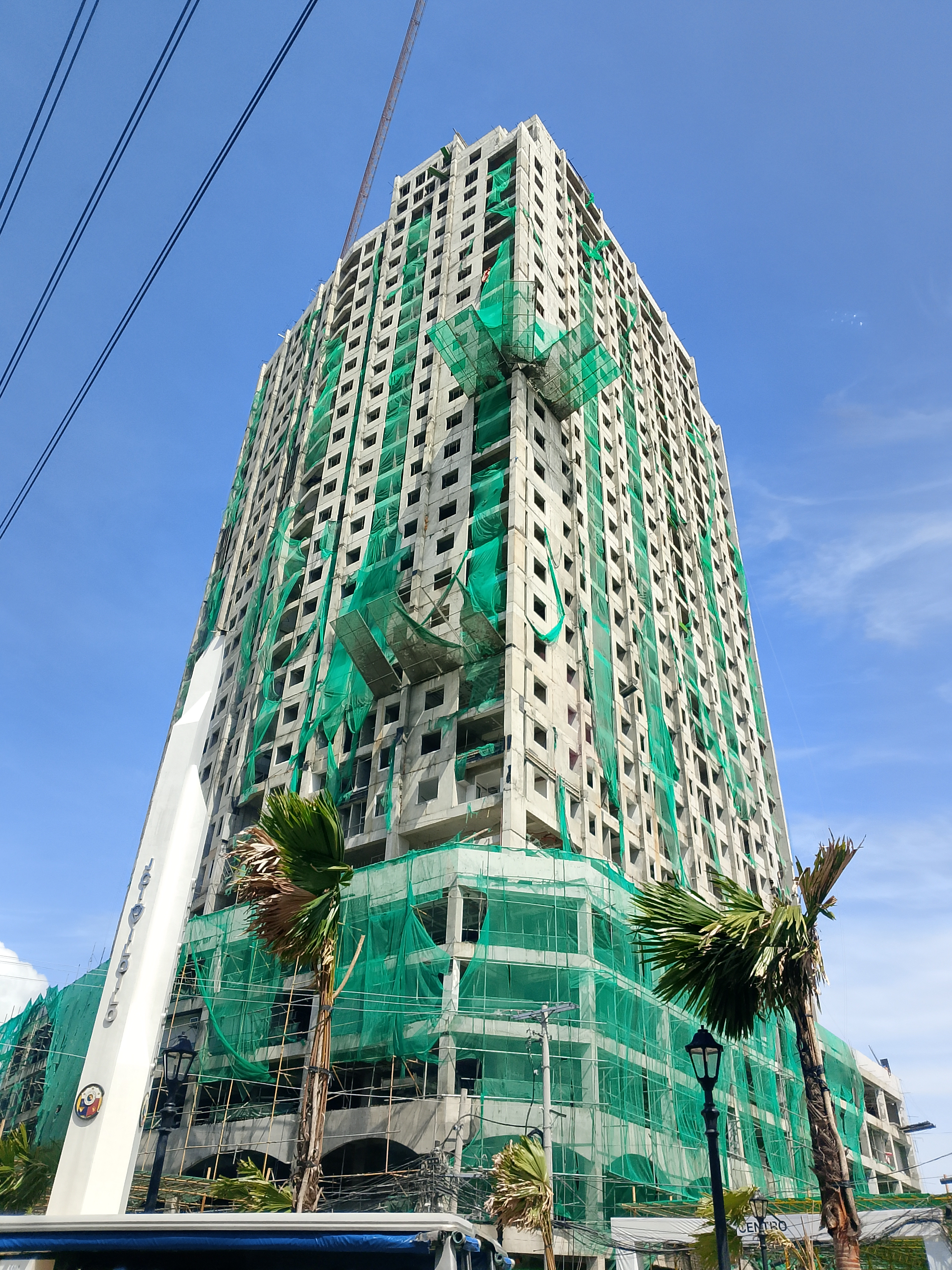
- Terranza Residences, as of November 2025
- Interactive map of the Terranza Residences area

General information
- Status: Under construction
- Type: Residential condominium
- Location: Arroyo Street Cor. Iznart Street, Iloilo City Proper, Iloilo City, Philippines
- Coordinates: 10.696839°N 122.569393°E
- Groundbreaking: October 2021
- Construction started: 2022
- Estimated completion: 2025
- Owner: GGTT Realty

Height
- Height: 116 m (380.58 ft)

Technical details
- Floor count: 33
- Floor area: 25,390 m^{2} (273,295.69 ft^{2})

Design and construction
- Architect: Edward Co Tan + Architects
- Developer: Cebu Landmasters, Inc. (CLI)
- Main contractor: International Builders Corporation (IBC)

Other information
- Number of units: 600

The Terranza Residences is a 33-storey residential tower under construction, located at the corner of Arroyo Street and Iznart Street in City Proper, Iloilo City, Philippines. It is being developed by Cebu Landmasters, Inc. (CLI) in partnership with International Builders Corporation (IBC) through their joint venture company, GGTT Realty.

Terranza Residences became the tallest building in Iloilo City and the Western Visayas upon its topping out in September 2025. It is also the first residential condominium built within the Calle Real Heritage Zone.

== Development ==
The ₱1.5-billion Terranza Residences project was officially launched in October 2021. The condominium is located within the Calle Real Heritage Zone, a protected area defined under Iloilo City Cultural Heritage Conservation Council (ICCHCC) Ordinance No. 54 of 2000. The ordinance established the boundaries and conservation guidelines for 26 heritage buildings and sites within Iloilo City Proper.

The construction of Terranza Residences drew some public attention due to its high-rise scale within a declared heritage zone. A few heritage advocates expressed concern that the building might affect the visual integrity of the historic downtown Iloilo and noted that Mandurriao, the district zoned for high-rise developments, would have been a more suitable location for such a project. The issue echoed the 2013 Torre de Manila controversy in Manila, where a condominium was criticized for disrupting the view of the Rizal Monument.

Iloilo City Mayor Jerry Treñas defended the project, saying he disagreed with claims that it would obstruct or diminish the sightlines of the surrounding heritage buildings. Treñas emphasized that Terranza Residences complied with the conservation guidelines of the heritage district and the setback requirements mandated by the National Building Code of the Philippines. The project also secured a zoning clearance from the Iloilo City Zoning Board of Adjustments and Appeals. Developers likewise stated that the tower’s design incorporates heritage-inspired architectural elements to complement the character of the surrounding historic district.

The construction began in mid-2022 and was topped out in September 2025, becoming the new tallest structure in Iloilo City. The project is targeted for completion in late 2025.

== Architecture and design ==
Artist's impression

Terranza Residences is designed as a 33-storey residential tower with a modern architectural style that incorporates heritage-inspired elements reflecting the historic character of Calle Real, a historic street in downtown Iloilo City. According to its developers, the design draws inspiration from traditional Filipino architecture, particularly the bahay na bato, featuring stone finishes, arched windows, and other classical details on its façade.

The tower sits on a multi-level podium that includes two floors of retail space and parking areas. Under the joint venture arrangement, International Builders Corporation (IBC) is responsible for building and managing the retail component, while Cebu Landmasters, Inc. (CLI) oversees the residential development of the project.

== See also ==
- Injap Tower Hotel
- List of tallest buildings in Iloilo
