= List of tallest buildings in Iloilo =

List of tallest buildings in Iloilo ranks the tallest buildings in Metro Iloilo, Philippines, according to their architectural height. The list includes buildings in Iloilo City and neighboring municipalities within the metropolitan area.

Iloilo City, the regional center of Western Visayas, has experienced significant high-rise development since the beginning of the 21st century, particularly in the residential, hospitality, and commercial sectors. The district of Mandurriao has the largest concentration of high-rise developments, particularly within Iloilo Business Park, Atria Park District, and along Sen. Benigno S. Aquino Jr. Avenue. Other developments are located in City Proper, Jaro, and neighboring municipalities such as Pavia and Oton.

== Tallest completed buildings ==
This list ranks completed buildings in Metro Iloilo by architectural height, including spires and other architectural features but excluding antenna masts. It includes buildings with at least 12 storeys or an architectural height of at least 35 metres (115 feet), in accordance with the criteria used by Emporis.

Rank	Name	Image	Location	Height	Floors	Year completed	Notes
1	Terranza Residences		Iloilo City Proper	116 m (381 ft)	33	2026*	Tallest building in Iloilo City and Western Visayas.
2	SM Strata Tower 1		Mandurriao	84 m (276 ft)	18	2018	Part of the twin-tower development SM Strata.
2	SM Strata Tower 2		Mandurriao	84 m (276 ft)	18	2024	Part of the twin-tower development SM Strata.
3	The Palladium		Mandurriao	80 m (260 ft)	22	2022	Tallest building in Iloilo Business Park.
4	International Corporate Plaza		Mandurriao	79.5 m (261 ft)	19	2024	
5	Injap Tower		Mandurriao	75 m (246 ft)	21	2013	Former tallest building in Iloilo from 2013 to 2018.
6	The Pinnacle		Mandurriao	73 m (240 ft)	20	2025	
7	Lafayette Park Square		Mandurriao	68 m (223 ft)	16	2018	
8	Courtyard by Marriott Hotel Iloilo		Mandurriao	67.9 m (223 ft)	16	2017	
9	Style Residences – Building A		Mandurriao	60 m (200 ft)	16	2023	
9	Style Residences – Building B		Mandurriao	60 m (200 ft)	16	2023	
9	Style Residences – Building C		Mandurriao	60 m (200 ft)	16	2023	
9	Style Residences – Building D		Mandurriao	60 m (200 ft)	16	2024	
9	Style Residences – Building E		Mandurriao	60 m (200 ft)	16	2024	
10	Avida Towers Atria – Tower 1		Mandurriao	57.88 m (189.9 ft)	15	2017	
10	Avida Towers Atria – Tower 2		Mandurriao	57.88 m (189.9 ft)	15	2018	
10	Avida Towers Atria – Tower 4		Mandurriao	57.88 m (189.9 ft)	15	2023	
11	Bernwood Tower		Iloilo City Proper	55 m (180 ft)	15	2024	
12	Robinsons Cybergate Iloilo – Tower 3		Pavia	48 m (157 ft)	14	2024	Tallest building in Pavia.
13	Grand Xing Imperial Hotel – East Wing		Iloilo City Proper	45.2 m (148 ft)	13	2017	
14	Richmonde Hotel & Tower		Mandurriao	45 m (148 ft)	14	2014	
15	Stronghold Insurance Western Visayas Corporate Center		Mandurriao	42 m (138 ft)	14	2022	
16	The SouthPrime Flats – Building 1		Mandurriao	41.8 m (137 ft)	14	2025	
17	Enterprise One		Mandurriao	41.5 m (136 ft)	12	2024	Part of a two-building office development.
17	Enterprise Two		Mandurriao	41.5 m (136 ft)	12	2025	Part of a two-building office development.
18	Avida Towers Atria – Tower 3		Mandurriao	40.4 m (133 ft)	11	2018	
19	Belmont Hotel		Mandurriao	40 m (130 ft)	12	2024	
19	Medicus Medical Center		Mandurriao	40 m (130 ft)	11	2013	
20	Grand Xing Imperial Hotel – West Wing		Iloilo City Proper	39.5 m (130 ft)	11	2016	
21	One Spatial – Building 1		Mandurriao	37 m (121 ft)	11	2017	
21	One Spatial – Building 2		Mandurriao	37 m (121 ft)	11	2019	
22	Robinsons Cybergate Iloilo – Tower 2		Pavia	36.9 m (121 ft)	10	2023	
23	One Madison Place – Tower 1		Mandurriao	36.7 m (120 ft)	10	2017	
23	One Madison Place – Tower 2		Mandurriao	36.7 m (120 ft)	10	2017	
23	One Madison Place – Tower 3		Mandurriao	36.7 m (120 ft)	10	2017	
24	Iloilo Business Hotel		Mandurriao	36.5 m (120 ft)	10	2007	Former tallest building in Iloilo from 2007 to 2013.
25	Iloilo City Hall		Iloilo City Proper	36.2 m (119 ft)	8	2011	
26	Park Inn by Radisson Iloilo		Mandurriao	36.16 m (118.6 ft)	10	2019	
27	WV Tower 1		Mandurriao	36 m (118 ft)	11	2022	
27	WV Tower 2		Mandurriao	36 m (118 ft)	11	2022	
28	Saint Honore		Mandurriao	35.9 m (118 ft)	10	2022	
28	Saint Dominique		Mandurriao	35.9 m (118 ft)	10	2023	
29	SM City Iloilo North Block		Mandurriao	35.8 m (117 ft)	10	2026	
30	Zuri Hotel Iloilo		Mandurriao	35.5 m (116 ft)	10	2019	
31	Avida Storeys Atria – Storeys 1		Mandurriao	35.3 m (116 ft)	10	2017	
31	Avida Storeys Atria – Storeys 2		Mandurriao	35.3 m (116 ft)	10	2018	
32	SuperCare Medical Services, Inc.		Mandurriao	35 m (115 ft)	10	2026	
32	August Residences		Mandurriao	35 m (115 ft)	10	2023	

== Buildings under construction or proposed ==
This section lists high-rise buildings under construction, undergoing site preparation, or proposed in Metro Iloilo. Expected completion dates are estimates and may be subject to change.

One of the tallest proposed developments in the city was the 40-storey Gaisano Tower, with a proposed height of 200 metres (660 ft). Announced in 2013 as part of the mixed-use Gaisano Iloilo City Center project in Mandurriao, the tower was never realized as originally announced for unknown reasons.

Name	Location	Height	Floors	Expected completion	Notes
Excelsior Sky Residences – Tower 1	Mandurriao	N/A	36	TBA	Proposed
Excelsior Sky Residences – Tower 2	Mandurriao	N/A	36	TBA	Proposed
The Vantage by Rockwell	Iloilo City Proper	N/A	25	TBA	Proposed
Avenir Iloilo	Mandurriao	N/A	22	TBA	Under construction
Firenze	Mandurriao	80 m (260 ft)	22	2028	Under construction
Bernwood Centrale	Jaro	55 m (180 ft)	15	2026	Topped off
WVSU Medical Arts Building	Jaro	N/A	15	2027	Under construction
NHA Condo Building	Mandurriao	N/A	15	TBA	Proposed
The SouthPrime Flats – Building 2	Mandurriao	N/A	14	2026	Topped off
The SouthPrime Flats – Building 3	Mandurriao	N/A	14	2027	Under construction
Augusta Residences	Oton	N/A	12	TBA	Site preparation
Green Meadows East Hotel	Jaro	N/A	12	TBA	Proposed
Myara Tower	Mandurriao	N/A	12	TBA	Proposed
Haru Residences	Mandurriao	N/A	11	TBA	Proposed
WVSUMC Cancer Institute and Heart, Lung and Kidney Center	Jaro	N/A	10	TBA	Proposed
Hacienda Verde Hotel	Pavia	N/A	10	TBA	Under construction
USWAG 4PH Condominium Complex	Jaro	N/A	10	2027	Under construction
PHINMA University of Iloilo – Site 4	Iloilo City Proper	N/A	10	TBA	Site preparation
University of San Agustin – Senior High School Building	Iloilo City Proper	N/A	8	TBA	Proposed
PHINMA University of Iloilo – Blanco Building	Iloilo City Proper	N/A	8	TBA	Topped off
PHINMA University of Iloilo – Site 1	Iloilo City Proper	N/A	8	TBA	Topped off
PHINMA University of Iloilo – Site 2	Iloilo City Proper	N/A	8	TBA	Under construction
PHINMA University of Iloilo – Site 3	Iloilo City Proper	N/A	8	TBA	Site preparation
Bernwood Resort Residences	Jaro	N/A	8	TBA	Proposed

== Timeline of tallest buildings ==
This is a chronological record of buildings to have held the title of tallest building in Iloilo City.

Name	Image	Location	Years as tallest	Height	Floors	Notes
Jaro Belfry		Jaro	1744–1882	29 m (95 ft)	3	
Oton Church		Oton	1882–1948	68.28 m (224.0 ft)	1	Demolished.
Jaro Belfry		Jaro	1948–1995	29 m (95 ft)	3	
Sky City Tower		Iloilo City Proper	1995–2007	29.4 m (96 ft)	9	
Iloilo Business Hotel		Mandurriao	2007–2013	36.5 m (120 ft)	10	
Injap Tower		Mandurriao	2013–2018	75 m (246 ft)	21	
SM Strata		Mandurriao	2018–2025	84 m (276 ft)	18	Twin-tower development.
Terranza Residences		Iloilo City Proper	2025–present	116 m (381 ft)	33	Still under construction as of November 2026.

== See also ==
- List of tallest buildings in the Philippines
- List of tallest buildings in Metro Manila
- List of tallest buildings in Cebu City
