= Donglü =

Donglü 东闾村
- Village
- Location in Hebei
- Coordinates: 38.684444°N 115.561666°E
- Country: People's Republic of China
- Province: Hebei
- Prefecture-level city: Baoding
- District: Qingyuan
- Town: Donglü Town (东闾镇)

Donglü (simplified Chinese: 东闾; traditional Chinese: 東閭; pinyin: Dōnglǘ), also written as Donglu, is a village in Donglü Town (东闾镇), in Qingyuan District, Baoding, Hebei province, China. It has become known for the apparition of the Blessed Virgin Mary, known as Our Lady of China, witnessed there in 1900, and the Marian shrine and pilgrimage site which have since developed.

== Geography ==
Donglü is located about 140 kilometres south-west of the Chinese capital Beijing and about 20 kilometers to the southeast of Baoding, to which Qingyuan County administratively belongs.

== Religion ==
In 2004 it was reported that as many as 7000 of Donglü's approximately 9000 residents are Catholic, giving the town probably a larger concentration of Catholics than any other place in China. The city is part of the Roman Catholic Diocese of Baoding.

Donglü is home to a Gothic-style church originally constructed in the late 1880s and rebuilt in 1992 after being reduced to ruins in 1941 during the Second World War when it caught fire due to Japanese artillery bombardment. The structure is said to be large enough to hold several thousand people; local officials reportedly maintain that the church building is the largest in north China.

== Our Lady of China ==
Donglü was the site of a Marian apparition in 1900 during the Boxer Rebellion. This apparition became known in Catholic devotion as Our Lady of China or Our Lady of Donglü. In the Catholic Church, Donglü was consecrated as the shrine for Our Lady of China in 1932 by Pope Pius XI. On May 23, 1995, an apparition of Mary took place, reportedly witnessed by over 30,000 pilgrims, and certified by the bishop of Baoding. Witnesses spoke of the sun spinning from left-to-right in the sky and giving off various colors. The phenomenon lasted approximately twenty minutes.

=== Recent events ===
Since the 1990s, multiple sources have reported that there have been several years in which pilgrimages to Donglü have been declared illegal by the government. Public security forces have been employed to attempt to prevent pilgrims from reaching the village or the shrine or to force those present to leave. In various incidents, multiple individuals have been arrested.

Various leaders of the Baoding diocese in which Donglü falls have also been arrested and/or incarcerated. In April and May 1996, up to 5,000 troops were mobilized along with about 30 armored cars as well as helicopters in order to isolate the village. The statue of Mary at the shrine was reportedly confiscated.

The original and largest shrine in Donglü has reportedly been destroyed by persecutors, though the original image of Our Lady of China is reportedly under the protection of disguised Catholic priests in the region.

== See also ==
- Our Lady of China
- Catholicism in China
- Christianity in China
- Our Lady of Sheshan
