= Mandurriao Church =

Roman Catholic church in Iloilo City, Philippines

- Espousal of Our Lady Parish Church
- Parokya ng Kasunduan sa Pagpapakasal ng Mahal na Birhen (Filipino); Parroquia de los Desposorios de la Virgen (Spanish)
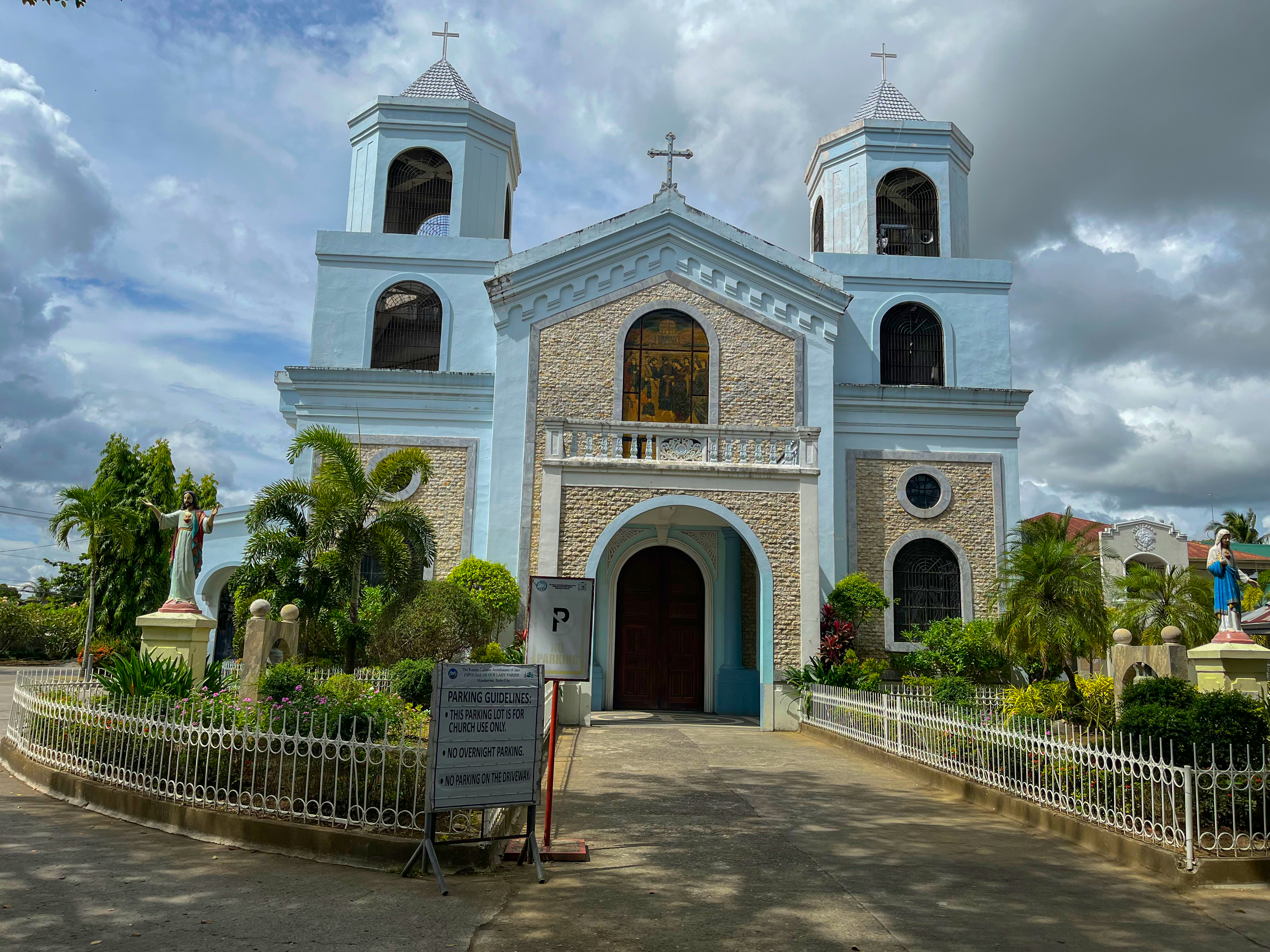
- The church in January 2025

- Location in the Visayas Location in the Philippines
- 10°43′3″N 122°32′10″E
- Location: Mandurriao, Iloilo City
- Country: Philippines
- Language(s): Hiligaynon, English
- Denomination: Roman Catholic

History
- Status: Parish church
- Founded: 1921; 105 years ago
- Dedication: Espousals of the Blessed Virgin Mary
- Consecrated: February 21, 1998; 28 years ago

Architecture
- Functional status: Active
- Architectural type: Church building
- Style: Neoclassical
- Groundbreaking: 1991; 35 years ago (reconstruction)
- Completed: 2000; 26 years ago (current building)

Specifications
- Materials: Stone, Concrete

Administration
- Archdiocese: Jaro
- Parish: Espousal of Our Lady

Clergy
- Priest: Rev. Msgr. Mario Cesar Enarsao P.C. Rev. Fr. Rex John Palmos Rev. Fr. Titus Prudente

Espousal of Our Lady Parish Church, commonly known as Mandurriao Church, is a Roman Catholic church located in the district of Mandurriao in Iloilo City, Philippines. It is under the Archdiocese of Jaro.

== History ==
Mandurriao Church was established as a visita under the Augustinian friars during the Spanish period in the 17th century. In 1768, it was handed over to the Jesuits, then later to the Dominicans, before being returned to the Augustinians. In 1921, Mandurriao became an independent parish. Unfortunately, during the Second World War, the colonial-era church, cemetery, and other structures, as well as its records, were destroyed.

Following the war, a modest house of worship was built, and reconstruction efforts culminated in the church's dedication in 1959. By 1985, plans for a new church emerged. Construction began in 1991, based on a design by Engr. Timoteo Jusayan, which was later modified by Engr. Ermelo Porras and Architect Rolando Siendo. The church was inaugurated on February 21, 1998, and its construction was completed two years later in 2000.

== Architecture ==
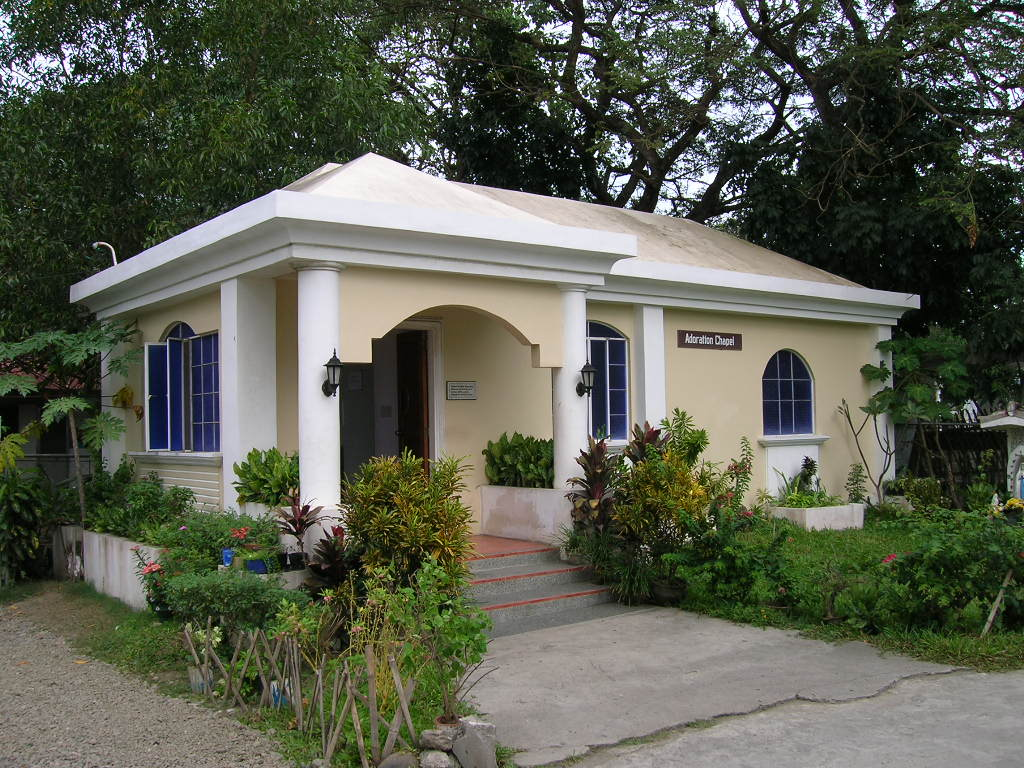
Mandurriao Church Adoration Chapel

The Mandurriao Church features a churchyard with a footpath leading to the portico, which is flanked by semicircular gardens. The gardens house the images of the Sacred Heart of Jesus on the gospel side and the Immaculate Heart of Mary on the epistle side.

The church's façade has a brick-tile surface, with a balustrade dividing the portico (which has an archway) from the pediment, which is punctured by an arch window. The façade is flanked by two bell towers, each with a base pierced by round and arch openings. The upper floors of the towers feature arch punctures, and the towers are capped with pyramidal roofs, adding to the church's classic architectural appeal.
