= Our Lady of China =

Chinese Catholic title for the Virgin Mary

Our Lady of China Nostra Domina de Sina Our Lady of Donglü 中華大聖母 / 東閭聖母
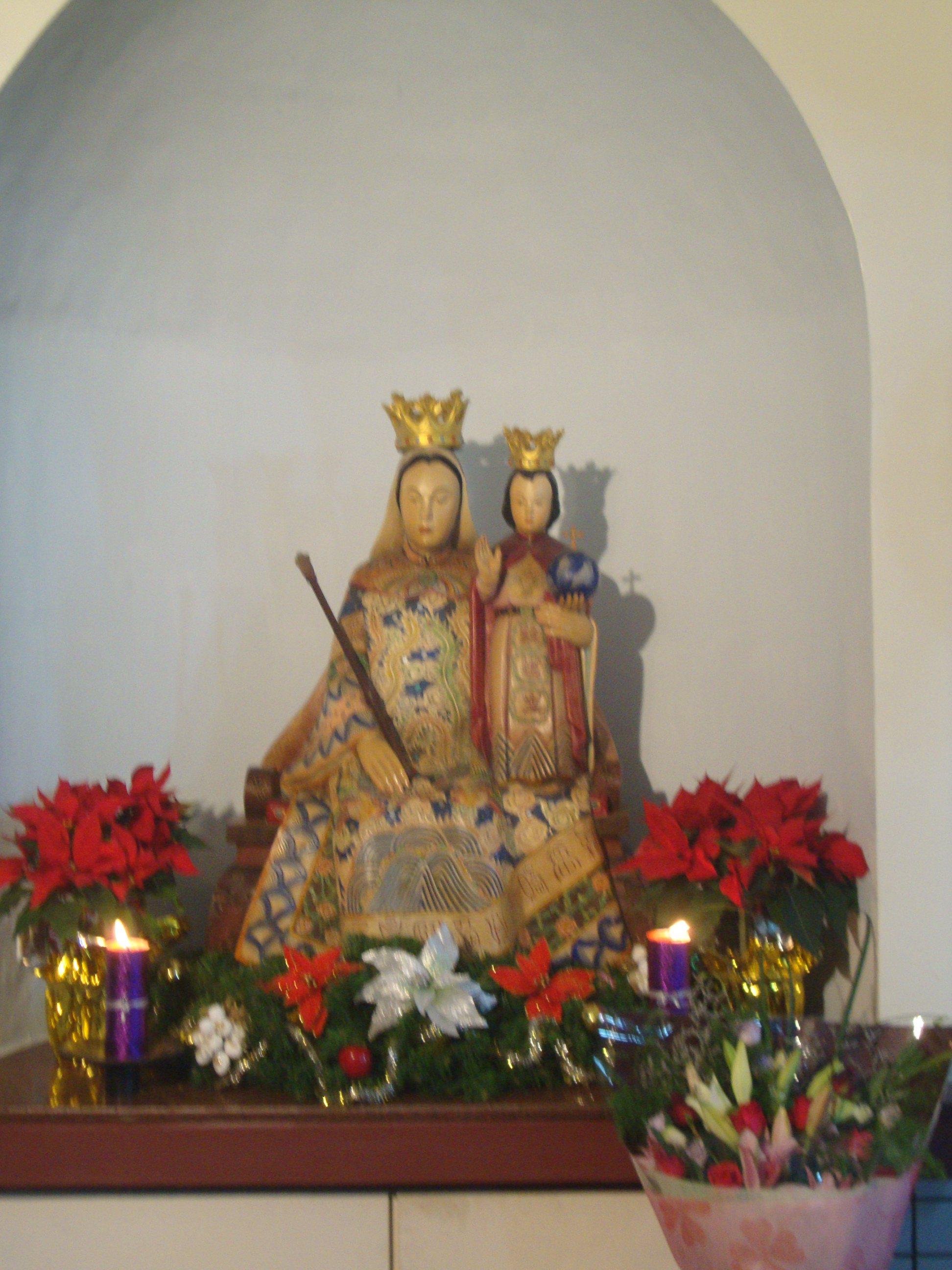
- The pontifically crowned image venerated in Chiayi, Taiwan
- Location: Chiayi County, Taiwan (Republic of China)
- Date: 1976
- Type: Wooden image, bejewelled crown and scepter
- Approval: Pope Francis
- Venerated in: Catholic Church
- Shrine: National Shrine of Our Lady of China, Meishan, Taiwan
- Patronage: Chinese peoples
- Attributes: Madonna and Child wearing Chinese imperial regalia
- Feast day: The Second Sunday of May; Chinese New Year's Day (Macau)

Our Lady of China, the Great mother (Latin: Nostra Domina de Sina) (traditional Chinese: 中華大聖母; simplified Chinese: 中华大圣母; pinyin: Zhōnghuá Da Shèngmǔ), also known as Our Lady of Donglü (traditional Chinese: 東閭聖母; simplified Chinese: 东闾圣母; pinyin: Dōnglǘ Shèngmǔ), is a Roman Catholic title of the Blessed Virgin Mary associated with a Marian apparition in Donglü, China in 1900.

Pope Francis granted an official decree of canonical coronation on 19 February 2021 towards a Marian image venerated at the National Shrine of Our Lady of China in Chiayi County, Taiwan. The rite of coronation was executed on 14 August 2022. (Note: Pope Francis, Congregation for Divine Worship and the Discipline of the Sacraments — Protocol Number: 464/20, 19 February 2021. Vatican Secret Archives.)

== History ==
=== In Hebei, China ===
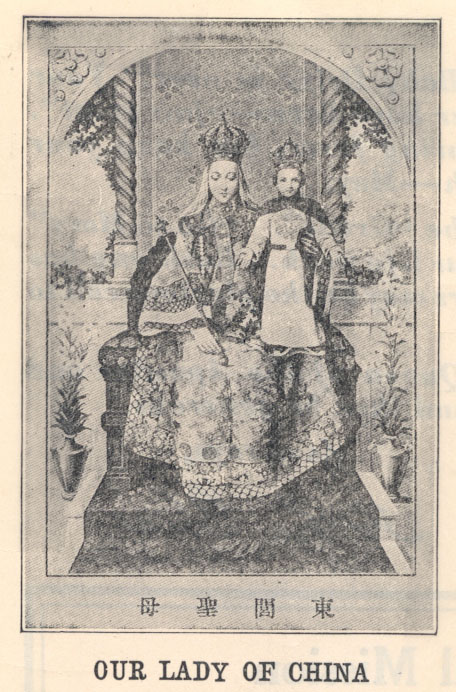
The original statue image of "Our Lady of China" or "Our Lady of Donglü" (東閭聖母) constructed in Yaoyang, Hebei province, destroyed in 1966 during the Cultural Revolution. A similar painting was reconstructed in 1989 now in its place.

During the Boxer Rebellion, a great number of soldiers attacked the village of Donglü, Hebei. The village consisted of a small community of Christians founded by the Vincentian Order of priests. Pious legends claim that the Blessed Virgin Mary appeared in white with a fiery horseman (believed to be Saint Michael the Archangel) who chased away the soldiers.

The local priest, Father Rene Flament of the Congregation of the Mission hired a local French painter in Shanghai to make a Marian statue similar to the Chinese dowager Empress Ci Xi. This image was based in the Marian image of “Our Lady of Laeken” venerated in the Church of Our Lady of Laeken in Brussels, Belgium. The Donglu statue was later destroyed in 1966 during the Cultural Revolution.

Accordingly, Donglu became a place of pilgrimage in 1924. The image was blessed and promulgated by Pope Pius XI in 1928. At the close of the 1924 Shanghai Synod of Bishops in China, the first national conference of bishops in the country, the Apostolic Chancellor, Cardinal Celso Costantini as the Apostolic Delegate in China, along with all the bishops of China, consecrated the Chinese people to the Blessed Virgin Mary. Pope Pius XII designated the feast day as an official feast of the Catholic liturgical calendar in 1941.

In 1973, the Chinese Bishops' Conference, upon approval from the Holy See, placed the feast day on the vigil (day preceding) of Mothers Day (the second Sunday of May).

In 1989, a painted canvas of the same Madonna with Child Jesus dressed in golden imperial robes was recreated, now enshrined at the altar of the “Our Lady of Donglu” parish.

=== In the United States of America ===
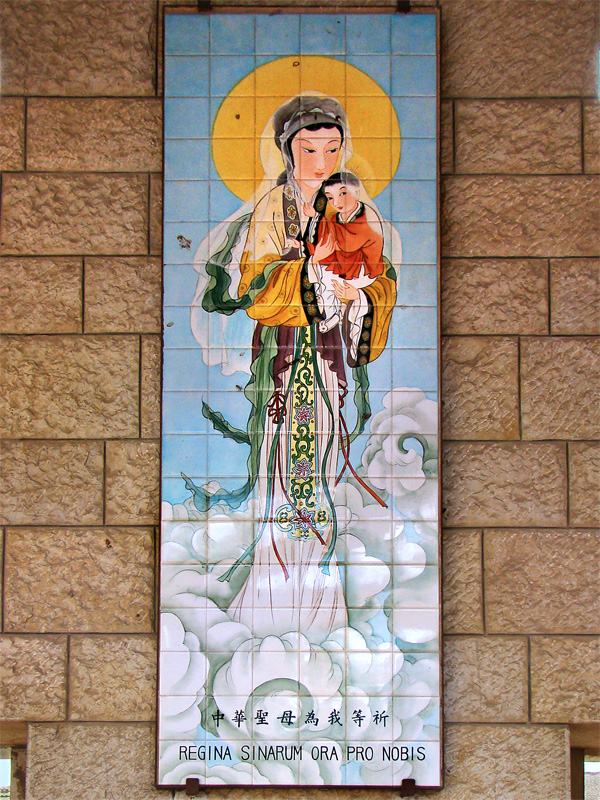
An image of the Madonna and child as Queen of China (Latin: Regina Sinarum) displayed at the Basilica of the Annunciation in Nazareth.

On 22 January 1982, an American shrine dedicated to the namesake Marian title was erected in Rockville, Maryland, United States under the auspices of the former Archbishop of Washington, Cardinal James Aloysius Hickey. The Catholic shrine serves as a pastoral mission to the Chinese peoples.

=== In the Republic of China ===
Alternatively in 1976, another statue was reconstructed in Taiwan now venerated in the “National Shrine of Our Lady of China”, which was constructed in 1913.

In 2020, the now Archbishop of Taipei, Thomas Chung An-Zu requested a formal coronation for the Marian image, which was granted and merited a decree of pontifical coronation from Pope Francis on 19 February 2021. The official decree was released to the Taiwanese media on 2 March 2021. The image was crowned on 14 August 2022.

Another namesake Marian Catholic parish is located in the #367 Jong—Zheng road of Xindian District in New Taipei, with a significant influx of both Taiwanese aboriginal and Vietnamese Marian devotees.

=== In Shanghai, China ===
The namesake Marian title is also honored by its Marian devotees as a variant name for the Blessed Virgin Mary of “Mary, Help of Christians” venerated at the Sheshan Basilica for communist—nationalist sentiments. Though the stylistic iconographies of both images of the enshrined Marian images differ.

== Marian image and veneration ==
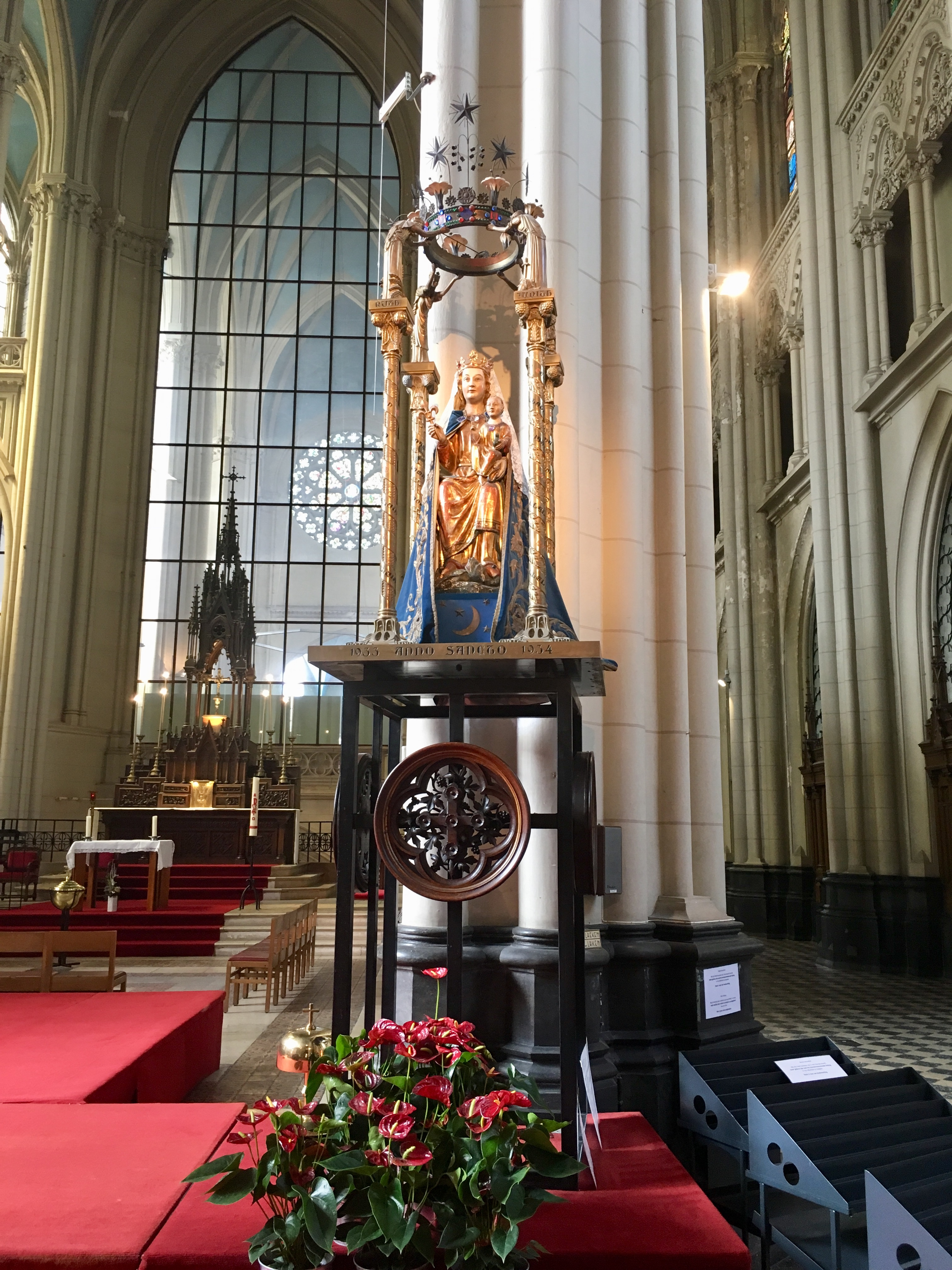
The Marian image venerated in the Church of Our Lady of Laeken in Brussels, where the Donglu image was patterned on. Pope Pius XI crowned this image on 17 May 1936.

A namesake mosaic is displayed at the Basilica of the National Shrine of the Immaculate Conception in Washington D.C. established in 2002.

Controversy arose due to the Marian iconography allegedly having syncretist associations to the Buddhist goddess Kuan Yin and not being officially sanctioned by the Holy Office for religious propagation. Adding more political issues, a Chinese cardinal, Thomas Tien Keng-Hsin, sanctioned this variant image for a religious prayer card for the persecuted in China, and was widely promoted in America and Canada. (Note: Several churches, chapels, and pastoral centers around the world, predominantly those focused on ministry to Chinese-speaking Catholics, have adopted the name, including a mission in Washington, D.C. St. Genevieve's Chinese Roman Catholic Church, Fresno, California also honors Our Lady of China. There is a Chapel of Our Lady of China in the Diocese of Brooklyn, New York. In the Philippines where the Chinese and Chinese-Filipinos comprise the biggest ethnic community, the Santa Maria Parish of the Jesuit Fathers, located at the old Ateneo campus in Iloilo City, is the only church in the country dedicated to Our Lady of China that is duly recognized by the Catholic Bishops Conference of the Philippines (CBCP). The Archdiocesan Shrine of the Most Sacred Heart of Jesus in D. Jakosalem, Cebu City, still by the Jesuits, also houses an image of Our Lady of China. It used to be dedicated to this title of Our Lady until the patronage was changed to the Sacred Heart of Jesus. Although Binondo in Manila is the country's Chinese capital, both the Minor Basilica of Saint Lorenzo Ruiz (Filipino Parish) and the Binondo Chinese Parish does not house an image of the Chinese Madonna (as clarified by representatives of both parishes). As of October 2020, images of Our Lady of China (sometimes referred to as Our Lady of Sheshan) can be found at the following Chinese-Filipino Catholic communities: Santa Maria- Our Lady of China Parish, Iloilo City; Ateneo de Iloilo - Santa Maria Catholic School, Iloilo City; Archdiocesan Shrine of the Most Sacred Heart of Jesus, Cebu City; Sacred Heart School - Ateneo de Cebu, Mandaue City; Saint Peter the Apostle Parish, Paco, Manila; Lorenzo Ruiz Mission Society Seminary, Manila; Saint Jude Catholic School (National Shrine of Saint Jude Thaddeus), Manila; St. Jude Thaddeus Parish, Legazpi City; Queen of Peace Parish, Bacolod City; Resurrection of the Lord Parish, Iligan City; and Our Lady of Lourdes Parish in Butuan City (P. Burgos Street).)

Nevertheless, Pope Francis granted a canonical coronation to the image, as existing at a shrine in Taiwan, in 2022.

== Notes ==
=== Sources ===
- https://web.archive.org/web/20050425130840/http://www.udayton.edu/mary/resources/olchina.html
- http://www.catholicculture.org/docs/doc_view.cfm?recnum=3172
