= Iloilo Scholastic Academy =

Private Chinese school in Iloilo City, Philippines

- 怡朗新华学院

Location
- Buhang Taft North, Mandurriao; Iloilo City, Iloilo 5000; Philippines
- Coordinates: 10°42′48″N 122°32′52″E

Information
- Other name: ISA
- Type: Private school
- Established: 2004
- Director: Peter M. Chan
- Grades: K–12
- Gender: Co-educational
- Language: English, Chinese, Filipino
- Website: www.isa.edu.ph

Iloilo Scholastic Academy (simplified Chinese: 怡朗新华学院; traditional Chinese: 怡朗新華學院; pinyin: Yílǎng Xīnhuá Xuéyuàn; Pe̍h-ōe-jī: Î-lóng Sin-hôa Ha̍k-īⁿ) (ISA) is a K–12 co-educational private school in Mandurriao, Iloilo City, Iloilo, Philippines. It was established in 2004 by a group of Ilonggo businessmen who wanted to have a school that aims to impress the Filipino and Chinese cultures in a new generation.
