= Ateneo de Iloilo =

Catholic Chinese school in Iloilo City

Ateneo de Iloilo Santa Maria Catholic School
- 怡朗亞典耀聖母學校
- The Jesuit Chinese-Filipino school in Western Visayas, Philippines
- Former names: Santa Maria Catholic School (1958-2004)
- Motto: In Omnibus Amare et Servire (Latin)
- Motto in English: To Love and Serve in All Things
- Type: Private Roman Catholic non-profit coeducational Basic education institution
- Established: 1958; 68 years ago
- Founders: Fr. Andrew Joliet, SJ
- Religious affiliation: Roman Catholic (Jesuit)
- Academic affiliations: PAASCU; JBEC; CEAP
- President: Arnel (Atong) T. Ong
- Principal: Arnel (Atong) T. Ong (acting)
- School chaplain: Fr. Braulio “Bong” Dahunan, SJ
- Academic staff: 150
- Administrative staff: 60
- Students: 2,100
- Location: Pison Ave, Brgy San Rafael, Mandurriao District, Iloilo City, Iloilo, Philippines; 10°42′18.68″N 122°32′50.08″E
- Campus: Urban; Main Campus 7.5 hectares (75,000 m^{2}) Atria Park District Brgy San Rafael, Mandurriao District Iloilo City; Satellite Campus City proper Gen. Blanco St. Iloilo City
- Alma Mater song: "Amare et Servire"
- Patroness: Blessed Virgin Mary (under the title of Our Lady Queen of China)
- Colors: Blue and White
- Sporting affiliations: ISSA, PRISAA, JAM
- Mascot: Blue Dragons
- Website: www.adi.edu.ph

The Ateneo de Iloilo – Santa Maria Catholic School (AdI–SMCS) (simplified Chinese: 怡朗亚典耀圣母学校; traditional Chinese: 怡朗亞典耀聖母學校; pinyin: Yílǎng Yàdiǎnyào Shèngmǔ Xuéxiào; Pe̍h-ōe-jī: Î-lóng A-tián-iāu Sèng-bió Ha̍k-hāu), is a private, Jesuit, Catholic, Chinese-Filipino Basic Education school run by the Philippine Province of the Society of Jesus in Iloilo City, Philippines. It is a non-stock and non-profit institution duly accredited by the Philippine Council for NGO Certification (PCNC). It is also recognized by the Philippine Accrediting Association of Schools, Colleges and Universities (PAASCU) with Level 2 accreditation. The Ateneo de Iloilo began in 1958 as a parochial school named Santa Maria Catholic School. In 2004, the school was officially recognized as a Jesuit school separate from the Santa Maria Parish and was renamed as "Ateneo de Iloilo – Santa Maria Catholic School". It is the eighth Jesuit school in the Philippines to be named "Ateneo". The Ateneo de Iloilo is a K-12 school and its curriculum includes Chinese language, Christian Living Education, and Ignatian Spirituality programs.

The Ateneo de Manila University Graduate School of Business has a satellite school in Iloilo. It is located in the Ateneo de Iloilo's San Rafael Campus. The presence of this graduate school is a trial balloon of the Ateneo de Iloilo's plan to become a higher education institution in the future and to eventually become a university.

== History ==
=== Early years ===
The Jesuits came to Iloilo City in 1953 after being expelled from China by the Communists, and continued their apostolic work in the local Chinese community. They first did parish-pastoral ministry. With the support of the Iloilo Chinese and Filipino communities, Santa Maria Parish under the tutelage of Our Lady Queen of China was established by Fr. Guerrino Marsecano, an Italian Jesuit missionary.

Jesuits believe that quality education is essential in molding good Catholic Christians; so in 1958, with nine students as enrollees, Fr. Andrew Joliet, a French Jesuit, and Fr. Santiago Leon, a Spanish Jesuit, acting as Founder/Director and Principal respectively, opened a parochial school that was named Santa Maria Catholic School (SMCS). A year after the founding of the school, a two-story wooden building was constructed to provide the students with eight classrooms. In 1962, through the beneficence of Eduardo and Cesar Lopez, additional classrooms were built on the brothers' lot situated across the street.

SMCS had its first batch of graduates from the Grade School Department in school year 1965–66. The school accepted its first batch of high school freshmen in school year 1966–67. SMCS held its first high school graduation in March 1970. In 1968, the Philippine government recognized SMCS as a Filipino school with a comprehensive Chinese language program.

From nine pupils in 1958, SMCS's student population had continuously grown. It accepted a total of 615 enrollees for high school alone in 1970. However, due to the decision of the Chinese Provincial superior to maintain only an elementary school, no freshmen were accepted for the school year 1971–72. As a result, high school enrollment plummeted to 513 and to 481 the following year. When parents of the students protested the phasing-out of the high school department, the Chinese Provincial Superior reconsidered his decision. A year after, enrollment started picking up as freshmen were again allowed to enroll for the school year 1972–73.

Meanwhile, a donation of 3,600 square meters of land by the Lopez family in June 1972 paved the way for the construction of a four-story concrete building in 1974 to replace the wooden one. The French-German missionary Fr. Arthur Baur, S.J., parish priest and Superior of the Sta. Maria community, added a new wing to the school in 1977.

Despite the limitations of a constricted space, SMCS's complex continued to grow under the tenure of Fr. John Chi, SJ. When SMCS celebrated its 25th founding anniversary in 1983, improvements such as the construction of additional comfort rooms, large classrooms, and a cluster of offices were undertaken. A two-story structure was also put up to house classrooms for kindergarten pupils. Two years later, administrative offices on the ground floor of the school were renovated and a conference room was added.

The integration of the Jesuits of the China Province delegation in the Philippines into the Jesuit Philippine Province on September 27, 1988, resulted in all the former delegation works being placed under the care and control of the Philippine Jesuit provincial superior. This facilitated the assignment of Filipino Jesuits to the three Chinese-Filipino schools run by Jesuits: the Santa Maria Catholic School (Iloilo), Sacred Heart School–Ateneo de Cebu, and Xavier School (San Juan, Metro Manila).

=== Recent years ===
With the incessant clamor of SMCS alumni and the local Iloilo community to let their children study in a Jesuit school, a plan for expansion and transfer to a new and spacious site was initiated.

On April 30, 2004, a Memorandum of Agreement was signed by Jesuit Father Provincial Romeo J. Intengan, S.J., Fr. Manuel A. Uy Jr., S.J., Director of SMCS, and Victor F. Pison of the Kauuturan Pison Development Corporation (KAPIDECO). The latter was donating 2.5 hectares of land to be part of the 7.5-hectare campus of a new Ateneo, the first in the Visayas. Archbishop Angel Lagdameo of the Archdiocese of Jaro and Iloilo City Mayor Jerry Treñas, an Ateneo de Manila alumnus, witnessed the MOA signing, which formalized the establishment of the Ateneo de Iloilo – Santa Maria Catholic School, a Jesuit school separate from the parish.

The new school campus is on a 7.5-hectare property in Barangay San Rafael, Mandurriao District, Iloilo City. This site is the new main campus of the school. Buildings for the preschool, grade school, high school, and administration were constructed in this new campus, along with a covered gymnasium, sports complex, and church. Phase 1 of the master plan of the new campus was completed and the High School Department transferred to the new site in June 2010.

Groundbreaking rites for the construction of a four-story building (Phase 2) worth P200 million for the use of the Grade School Department and the Administration were held on June 1, 2013. Construction of the Grade School and Administration buildings (Phase 2) began in late 2013. It was opened for Preschool and Grades 1–2 in 2016 and became fully operational in the school year after.

The school has totally transferred to the new site in Barangay San Rafael, Mandurriao District, Iloilo City, in 2017, with 2,100 students and 200 faculty and staff. The old campus at General Blanco Street is now being used as a center for evangelization and pastoral activities by the Jesuits. School year 2018–2019 marks the school's Golden Anniversary with a theme: 60 years of forming leaders ignited by love and service.

== PAASCU accreditation ==
During the five-year term (1991–1996) of Fr. Renato Puentevella, S.J, as Director - Principal, SMCS went through the Philippine Accrediting Association of Schools, Colleges, and Universities (PAASCU) Preliminary Survey and Formal Survey. The Grade School Department was granted a three-year PAASCU accreditation in 1995 and the High School Department followed suit the following year.

== See also ==
- List of Jesuit educational institutions in the Philippines
- List of Jesuit sites
