= Injap Tower Hotel =

- Injap Tower (left) in 2018
- Interactive map of the Injap Tower Hotel area

General information
- Status: Completed
- Type: Condo hotel
- Location: Benigno S. Aquino Jr. Avenue, Mandurriao, Iloilo City, Philippines
- Coordinates: 10.7139°N 122.5527°E
- Construction started: 2010
- Completed: 2013
- Operator: Hotel 101

Height
- Height: 74.9 metres (246 ft)

Technical details
- Floor count: 21

Other information
- Number of rooms: 194 (2016)

Injap Tower Hotel is a 21-storey condo hotel located along Sen. Benigno Aquino Jr. Avenue in Mandurriao, Iloilo City, Philippines, directly across from SM City Iloilo. The hotel is managed by Hotel 101 and was initially operated by Hotel of Asia, Inc. upon its opening in 2013, under DoubleDragon Corporation.

Upon its completion in 2013, Injap Tower Hotel became the tallest building in Iloilo City and in the Western Visayas region, standing at a height of 74.9 metres (246 feet). It held the status until 2018, when it was surpassed by the nearby 18-storey SM Strata twin towers, which are approximately 9 metres (30 feet) taller. As of 2025, Injap Tower remains the tallest hotel in Western Visayas and the fourth tallest building in Iloilo City.

The hotel features 194 identical rooms marketed as "Happy Rooms." It also features the Horizon Café, a restaurant located on the top floor, and a wellness facility known as The Spa Circle.

== See also ==
- Hotel 101
- List of tallest buildings in Iloilo
