= Atria Park District =

Mixed-use development in Iloilo City, Philippines

- Atria Park District aerial view

Project
- Opening date: 2012; 14 years ago
- Developer: Ayala Land, Inc.
- Operator: Ayala Property Management Corporation
- Owner: Ayala Land, Inc. KAPIDECO Group
- Website: Official website

Location
- Interactive map of Atria Park District
- Coordinates: 10°42′24.6″N 122°32′52.2″E
- Country: Philippines
- Island: Panay
- Region: Western Visayas
- City: Iloilo City
- Location: Mandurriao, Iloilo City, Philippines

Atria Park District is a 32-hectare (79-acre) master-planned, mixed-use development located in the district of Mandurriao, Iloilo City, Philippines by Ayala Land, Inc. It features residential buildings, office buildings, outdoor malls, and an educational and a medical institution.

The property is a joint venture with Kauuturan Pison Development Corporation (KAPIDECO) Group, located in Barangay San Rafael, Mandurriao, which used to be covered with vast salt beds. The property also includes a 35-foot Pison Chimney Monument.

== Facilities ==
The development includes Avida Towers Atria, a 15-storey condominium complex with four towers, and Avida Storeys Atria, a 10-storey condominium with two towers. Commercial spaces include The Shops at Atria, an outdoor mall managed by Ayala Malls, offering dining, retail, and service establishments with Metro Supermarket as its anchor. The Strip at Atria is another shopping and dining area.

The district also houses the 104-bed Healthway Qualimed Hospital Iloilo, the first Ayala hospital in the Visayas and Mindanao, serving as a regional center for women's health and pediatric services. Seda Atria Hotel Iloilo, a 152-room hotel, is the first Seda Hotel brand in the Visayas. The Ayala Techno Hub Iloilo is a two-hectare BPO and IT center. Ateneo de Iloilo, a private Catholic, Chinese-Filipino school, is also a part of the development.

In November 2023, Atria Park District was relaunched with a new logo and developments including the Atria Gardens, a lifestyle garden district that will feature shopping and dining components in a park setting. It will also include three new Techno Hub BPO buildings.

== Gallery ==
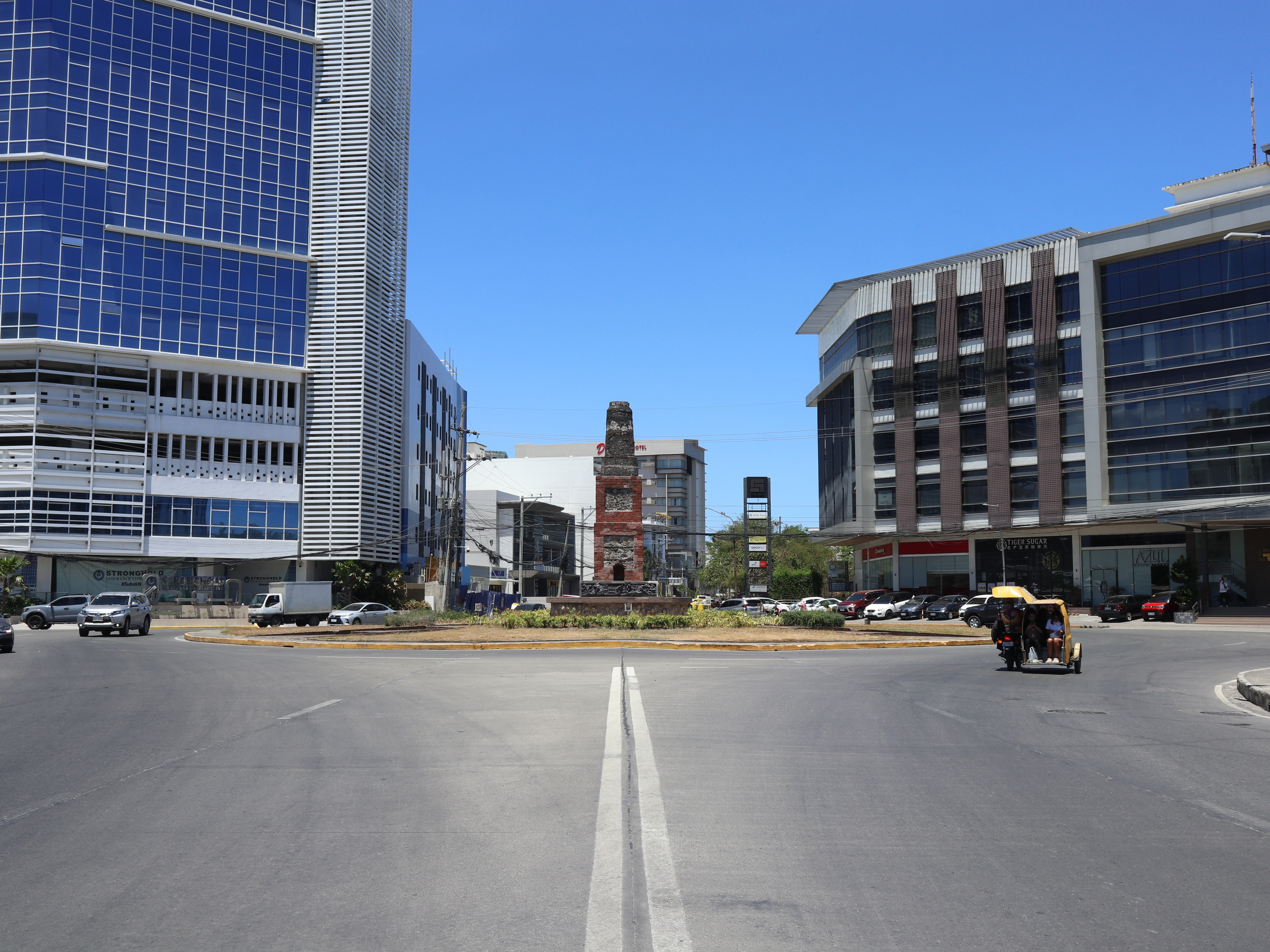
Pison Chimney Monument

Healthway Qualimed Hospital Iloilo

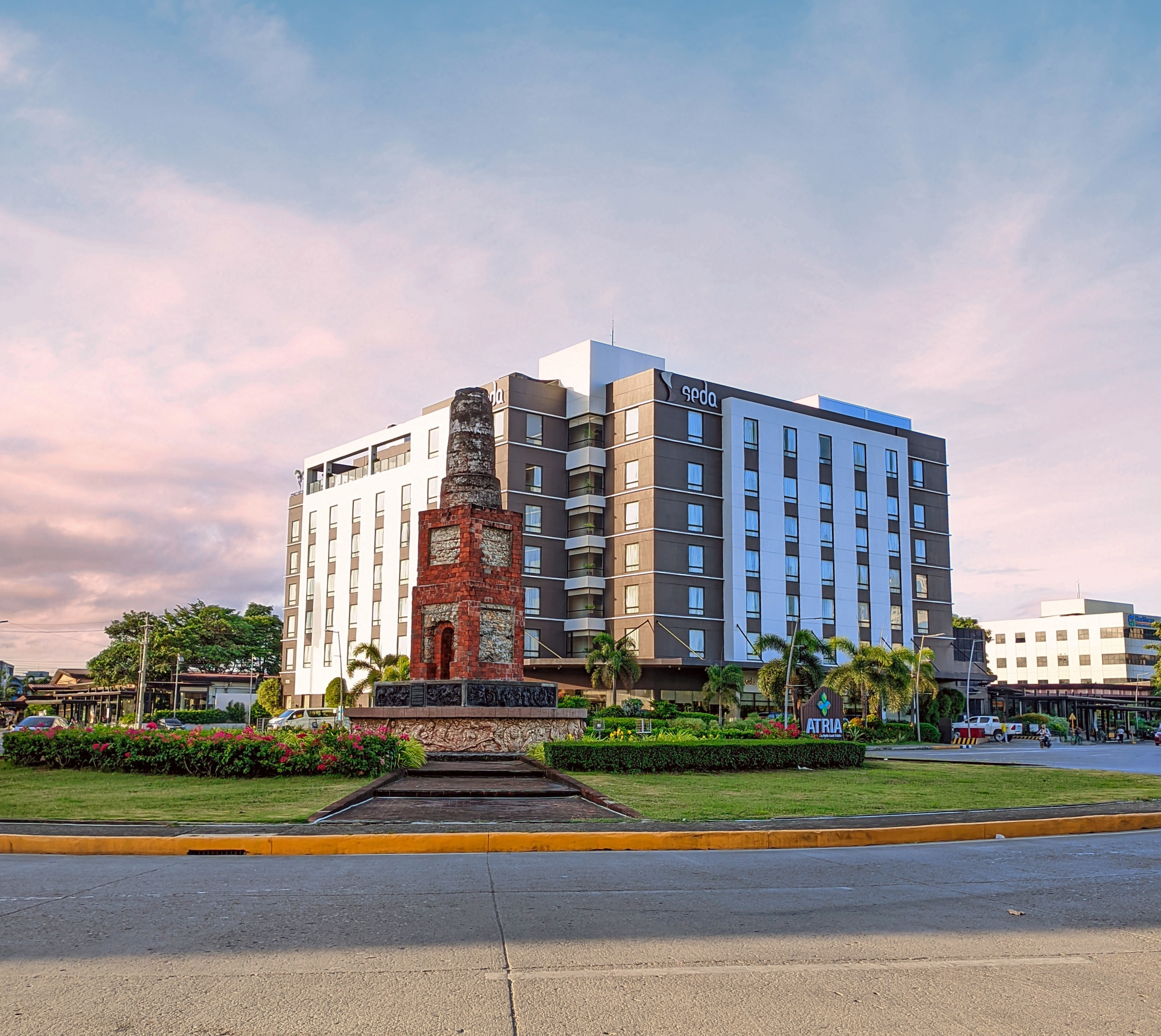
Seda Hotel Atria
