= Smallville Business Complex =

Commercial district in Mandurriao, Iloilo

Coordinates: 10°42′18″N 122°33′06″E

Smallville Business Complex, also known as Smallville Complex or simply Smallville, is a commercial and entertainment district located in Mandurriao, Iloilo City, Philippines. It is one of the city's nightlife areas, and was once regarded as Iloilo's nightlife capital before subsequent developments expanded across the district of Mandurriao. The area is known for its bars, nightclubs, restaurants, and hotels.

Originally, the term "Smallville" specifically referred to a complex of restaurants, bars, and clubs situated adjacent to the Iloilo Business Hotel. As the area expanded, "Smallville" continued to be used to describe the broader vicinity, which now includes the original Smallville Commercial Complex and extends to Riverside Boardwalk, another establishment near the Iloilo River Esplanade.
