= Mandurriao =

District of Iloilo City, Philippines

- District of Iloilo City
- Mandurriao CBD

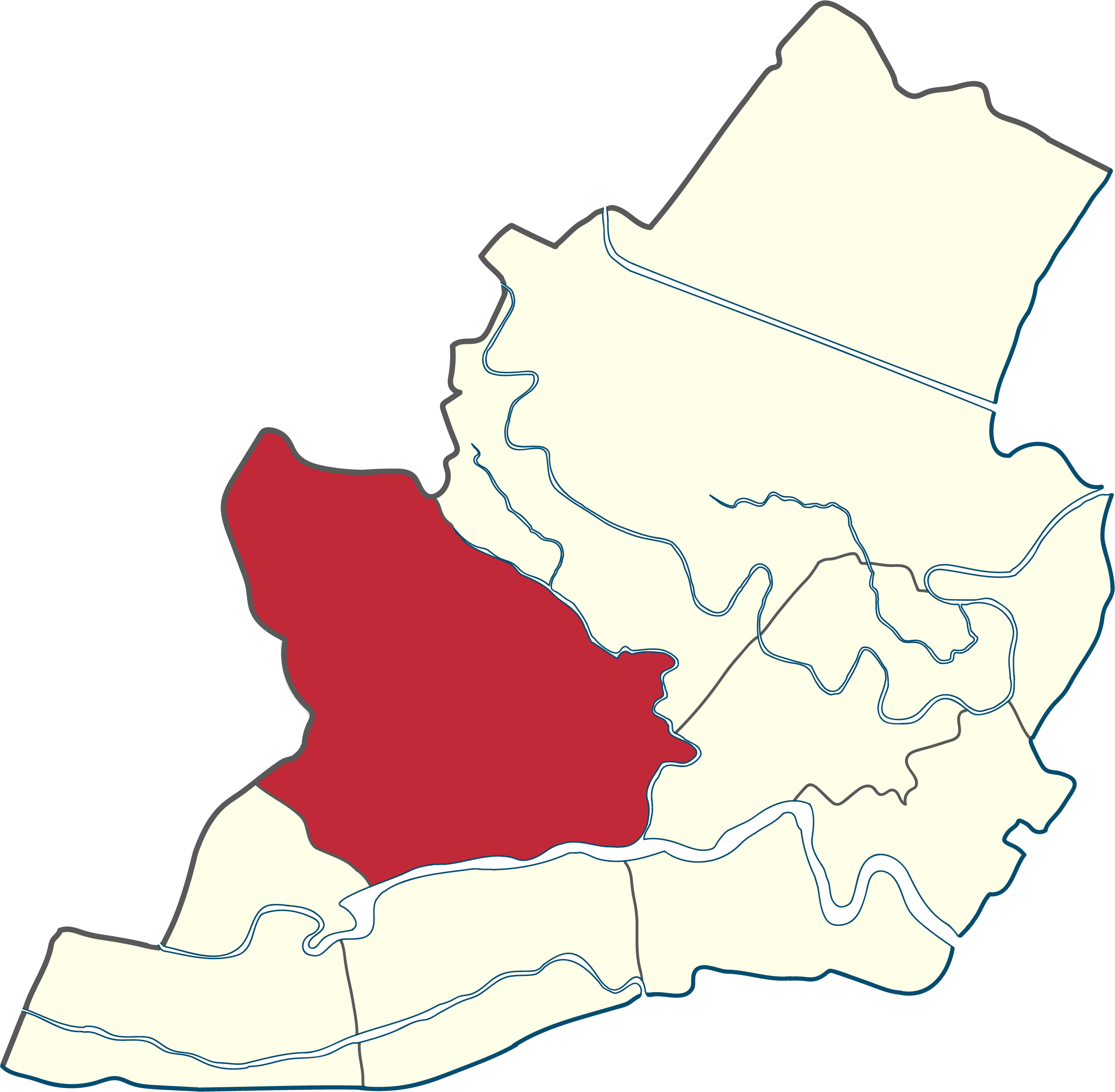
- Location within Iloilo City
- Interactive map of Mandurriao
- Location in the Philippines Mandurriao (Philippines)
- Coordinates: 10°43′3″N 122°32′11″E
- Country: Philippines
- Region: Western Visayas (Region VI)
- Province: Iloilo (geographically only)
- City: Iloilo City
- Congressional District: Lone district of Iloilo City
- Established: 1726
- Merged into city: August 25, 1937
- Barangays: 18 (see Barangays)

Government
  - District ABC President: Ariel Mirar

Area
  - Total: 13.78 km^{2} (5.32 sq mi)

Population (2024 census)
  - Total: 66,464
  - Density: 4,823/km^{2} (12,490/sq mi)
- Demonym: Manduryawnon
- Time zone: UTC+8 (Philippine Standard Time)
- ZIP code: 5000
- Area code: 33
- Patron saint: The Espousal of Our Lady and Saint Joseph
- Feast day: November 26
- Native languages: Hiligaynon

Mandurriao ([manduˈryaw]) is a district in Iloilo City, Philippines. It is the second-largest district by geographical area as well as the third-most populous district, with 66,464 people in the 2024 census. Mandurriao is one of the major business districts of Iloilo City, along with Iloilo City Proper.

Mandurriao is known for its modern developments and vibrant nightlife scene. The district is home to several major mixed-use developments, including Iloilo Business Park, Atria Park District, SM Iloilo Complex, Smallville Business Complex, and Gaisano Iloilo City Center. Due to its dynamic environment, Mandurriao is sometimes nicknamed 'the district that never sleeps' of Iloilo.

== Etymology ==
The name Mandurriao was derived from the names of two crocodiles fighting named Mandu and Riao during the exploration of the Spaniards in Iloilo. The names of the crocodiles were originally from two now-defunct lakes also named Mandu and Riao, where the two crocodiles' habitats are, respectively. It later formed in the minds of the people that the place was called Mandurriao. Eventually, the letter "r" in Mandu-Riao was replaced with "rr". For the Spaniards, having an "rr" in a word brought further beauty and character.

== History ==
Mandurriao Church

Mandurriao was founded in 1726. Originally a municipality in its own right, it was legally annexed into Iloilo City on July 16, 1937, which was formally inaugurated on August 25, 1937, along with the former towns of Arevalo, La Paz, and Molo under Act No. 719 of 1903.

Initially, Mandurriao was predominantly a residential and agricultural district, known for its fishponds and salt beds. However, over time, the district underwent significant transformation and evolved into a bustling business district. The former fishponds and salt beds have given way to urban development, paving the way for the emergence of the city's new commercial hub.

Today, Mandurriao stands as a thriving area with a vibrant mix of residential, commercial, and business establishments. It has become an important center of commerce and economic activity within Iloilo City. The district's urban development has attracted various industries, contributing to the growth and prosperity of the city as a whole.

=== Mandurriao Airport period (1937–2007) ===
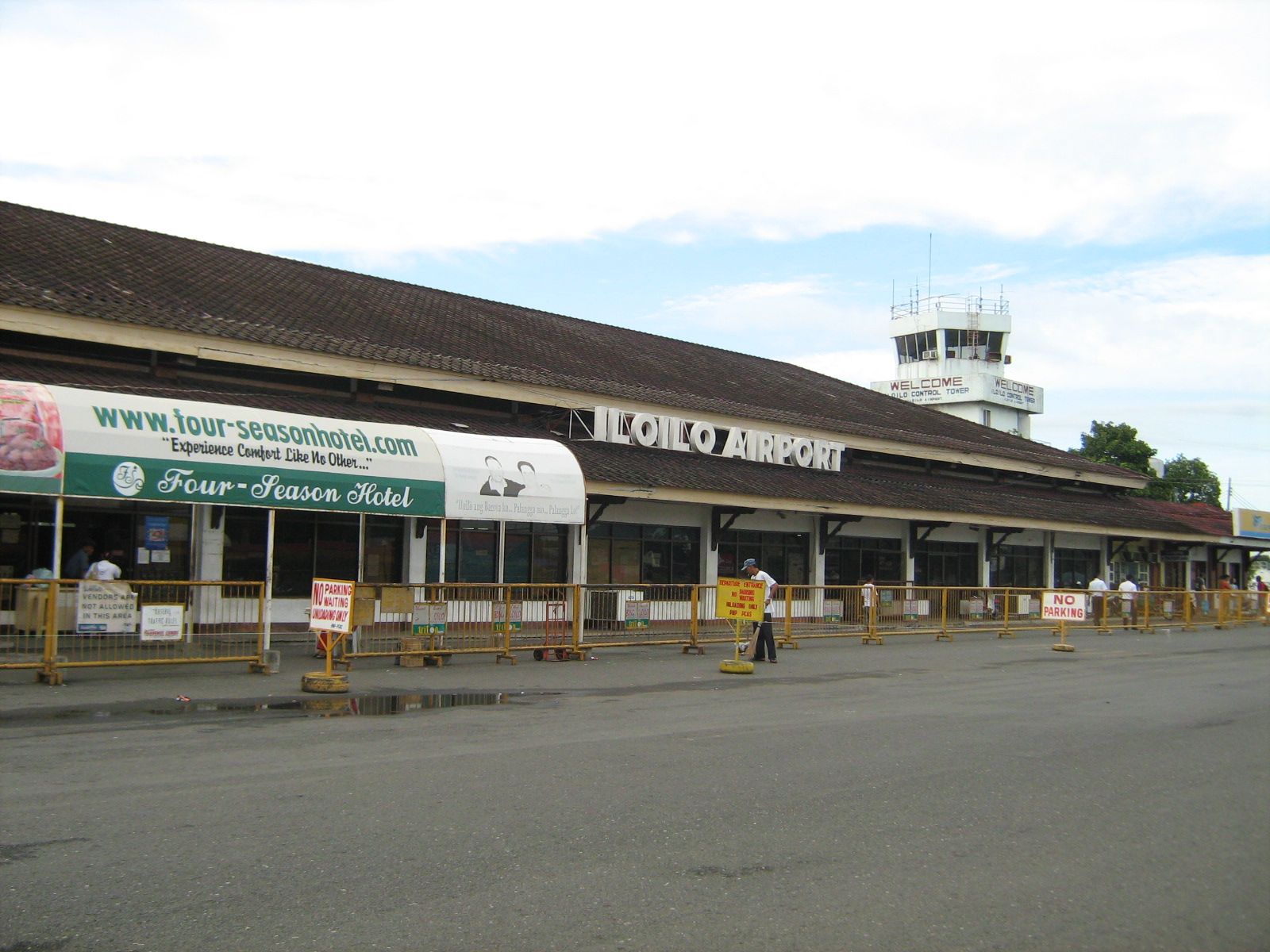
Façade of Mandurriao Airport before it was demolished

Mandurriao Airport was built in 1937 and has served as the gateway to Iloilo. The airport was also used as a World War II airfield. In the 1990s, the Philippine aviation industry liberalized and air travel increased in the country, and problems at Mandurriao Airport began to emerge, prompting the national government as well as the city and provincial government's agreement to a proposal to build the current Iloilo Airport outside of the city.

=== Development period ===
Injap Tower Hotel and SM Strata

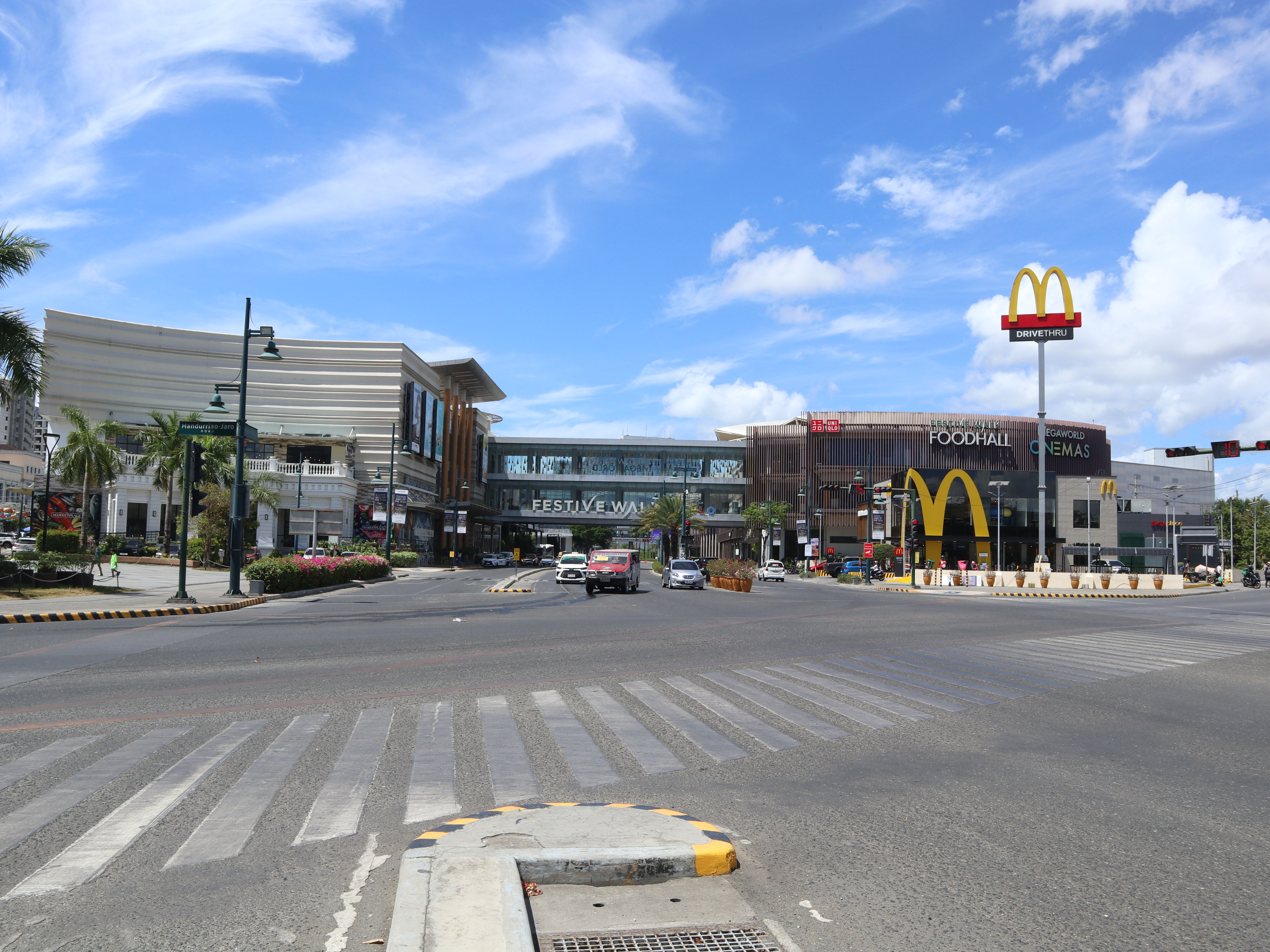
Megaworld Boulevard in Iloilo Business Park

In 2007, the new airport in Cabatuan, Iloilo was opened, rendering the old airport in Mandurriao available for privatization. Megaworld Corporation acquired the 72-hectare site of the old airport for ₱1.2 billion (approximately $2.5 million) with plans to develop it into Iloilo City's new central business district (CBD), known as Iloilo Business Park.

The transformation of the former airport site into the Iloilo Business Park has attracted significant investment from prominent companies. Alongside Megaworld Corporation, Ayala Corporation, SM Development Corporation, and Gaisano Group of Companies have also invested in the surrounding area of Mandurriao. This influx of investment has led to the development of commercial and residential projects, including office buildings, shopping centers, hotels, and residential condominiums.

In 2015, the Iloilo Convention Center was constructed on the former site of the airport's passenger terminal, which had been demolished between 2012 and 2013. The Iloilo Convention Center played a pivotal role in hosting the APEC Finance meetings in the same year, showcasing Iloilo's capacity to host international events.

The development of the Iloilo Business Park and the surrounding area in Mandurriao has significantly transformed the landscape and economic profile of the district. It has become a vibrant center for business, commerce, and leisure, attracting both local and foreign investments while contributing to the overall growth and progress of Iloilo City. Mandurriao hosts a growing Indian community near the Nanak Darbar Indian Sikh Temple where it held the Guinness world record, for simultaneous candle lighting by 100,000 people for the world peace.

== Geography ==
Mandurriao is the second-largest district in Iloilo City, covering 13.78 square kilometres (5.32 sq mi). It is 4.77 kilometres (2.96 mi) away from Iloilo City Proper. Mandurriao is bordered by the districts of Jaro to the northeast, La Paz to the east, City Proper to the southeast, Molo to the south, and Arevalo to the southwest. It also connects with the municipalities of Oton to the west and Pavia to the north. Mandurriao is the only district in Iloilo City without access to the Iloilo Strait.

=== Barangays ===
The district of Mandurriao has a total of 18 barangays.

- Abeto Mirasol Taft South (Quirico Abeto)
- Airport (Tabucan Airport)
- Bakhaw
- Bolilao
- Buhang Taft North
- Calajunan
- Dungon C
- Guzman-Jesena
- Hibao-an Norte
- Hibao-an Sur
- Navais
- Oñate de Leon
- Pale Benedicto Rizal
- PHHC Block 17
- PHHC Block 22 NHA
- San Rafael
- Santa Rosa
- Tabucan

== Economy ==
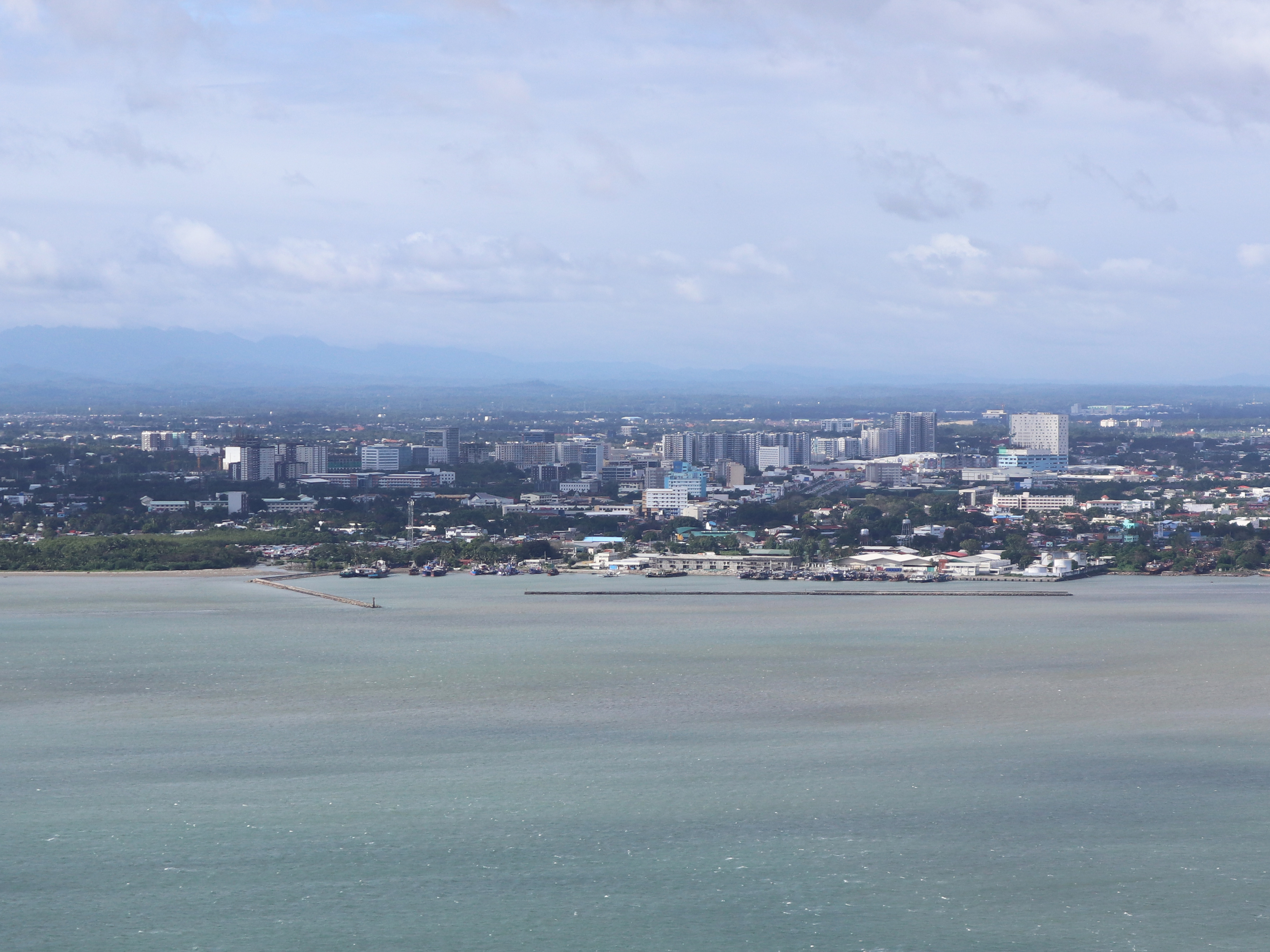
Skyline view of Mandurriao high-rise structures as seen from Balaan Bukid in Guimaras

Mandurriao, serves as a hub for trade, commerce, finance, real estate, and business process outsourcing in Iloilo City, along with Iloilo City Proper. Mandurriao has experienced rapid development, becoming the fastest-growing district in the city. Mandurriao is home to four major mixed-use development townships, namely Iloilo Business Park, Atria Park District, SM Iloilo Complex, and Iloilo City Center. The developments are located close to each other, forming a central business district (CBD) referred to as the Iloilo Business Triangle or Mandurriao Business District.

SM City Iloilo, the largest mall in Iloilo

Mandurriao has the highest concentration of high-rise buildings in Iloilo City. The economic activities in Mandurriao continue to thrive, with the continuous growth of business process outsourcing (BPO) companies, upscale hotels, residential towers, large malls, parks, and offices throughout the district.

== Education ==
Mandurriao has several academic institutions. The most notable ones are namely, Ateneo de Iloilo–Santa Maria Catholic School, Iloilo Scholastic Academy, Santa Isabel College of Iloilo City, St. Joseph School, and Mandurriao National High School, among others. Additionally, a new campus of National University is currently under construction next to SM City Iloilo.

== Transportation ==
Mandurriao is mostly served by jeepneys and white-metered taxis. Tricycles and trisikads are also being used as transportation within the district for shorter distances. The Aleosan Transport Terminal (Hibao-an Terminal) in Hibao-an Norte, Mandurriao serves routes to central Iloilo towns or ALEOSAN (Alimodian, Leon, San Miguel) towns, vice versa.

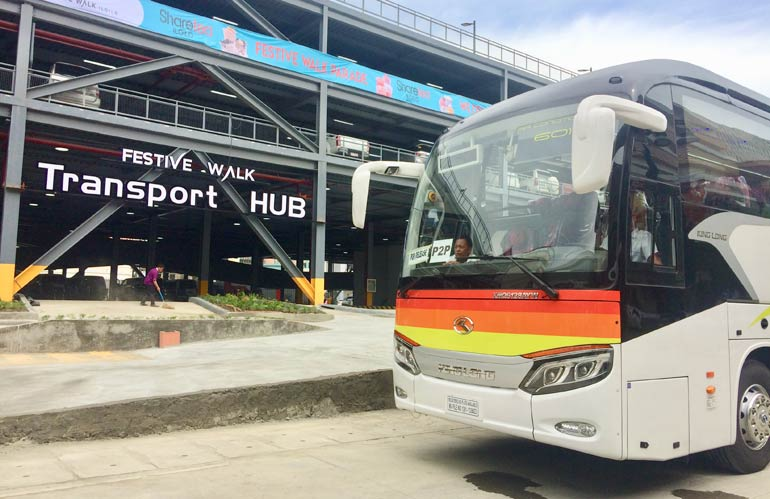
Festive Walk Transport Hub and the Premium Point-to-Point (P2P) Bus servicing Iloilo City to Iloilo International, Kalibo International, and Caticlan Airports and vice versa.

In March 2019, the Land Transportation Franchising and Regulatory Board announced the opening of a new Premium Point-to-Point Bus Service in Iloilo City with express bus services from Festive Walk Transport Hub in Iloilo Business Park to Iloilo International, Kalibo International, and Caticlan airports in Cabatuan, Kalibo, and Boracay (Caticlan, Malay), respectively.

In addition to Iloilo City's being the Bike Capital of the Philippines, there is also a network of the country's longest protected bike lanes that follows the long stretch of Diversion Road that traverses Mandurriao's new business center. The bike lane stretches from Iloilo Esplanade up to Ungka in Jaro.

== See also ==
- Iloilo Business Park
- Atria Park District
- List of tallest buildings in Iloilo
