= Iloilo International Airport =

Airport serving Iloilo, Philippines

Iloilo International Airport Pangkalibutan nga Hulugpaan sang Iloilo Pangkalibutan nga Hərəgpaan kang Iloilo Paliparang Pandaigdig ng Iloilo Aeropuerto Internacional de Iloílo
- The passenger terminal building in 2022
- IATA: ILO; ICAO: RPVI; WMO: 98637

Summary
- Airport type: Public
- Owner/Operator: Civil Aviation Authority of the Philippines
- Serves: Metro Iloilo–Guimaras
- Location: Cabatuan, Iloilo, Philippines
- Opened: June 14, 2007; 19 years ago
- Operating base for: Cebu Pacific
- Time zone: PHT (UTC+08:00)
- Elevation AMSL: 46.64 m (153.0 ft)
- Coordinates: 10°49′58″N 122°29′36″E

Maps
- Map of Iloilo International Airport complex
- Location within Visayas Location within Philippines

Runways
Direction	Length		Surface
Direction	m	ft	Surface
02/20	2,500	8,202	Asphalt concrete

Statistics (2025)
- Passengers: 3,101,280 ▲11.25%
- Aircraft movements: 22,410 ▲9.18%
- Cargo (in kg): 8,114,853 ▲672.06%
- Source: CAAP https://www.caap.gov.ph/aircraft-passenger-and-cargo-movements/

Iloilo International Airport (IATA: ILO, ICAO: RPVI), also known as Cabatuan Airport, after its location, is the main international airport serving Iloilo City and its metropolitan area, as well as the rest of Iloilo province in the Western Visayas region of the Philippines. It is the fifth-busiest airport in the Philippines and is located in the municipality of Cabatuan, Iloilo, approximately 24 kilometers (15 mi) northwest of Iloilo City proper. The airport sits on a 188-hectare (460-acre) site and serves as an operating base for Cebu Pacific.

The airport opened to commercial traffic on June 14, 2007, replacing the old Iloilo Airport in Mandurriao, Iloilo City, after over seventy years in operation. The new airport inherited its IATA and ICAO airport codes, as well as its position as the fourth-busiest airport in the Philippines from its predecessor. It is the first airport in both Western Visayas and the island of Panay built to international standards, serving as the primary gateway to the region. It is classified as an international airport by the Civil Aviation Authority of the Philippines.

== History ==
=== Early history ===
The site of the current airport was originally a World War II airfield constructed in 1942. It was called Cabatuan Airfield after its location by the Japanese forces which operated it during the war. It was also referred to as Tiring Landing Field (TLF) by others but this is an inaccurate name as the airfield had installations in other Cabatuan, Iloilo barrios as well. Another erroneous name was Santa Barbara Airfield, erroneous as the airfield was not located in the neighboring town. The Japanese forces operated Cabatuan Airfield from 1942 until their retreat in 1945, and it was also the site of the official Japanese surrender on Panay on September 2, 1945.

=== Situation at Mandurriao Airport ===
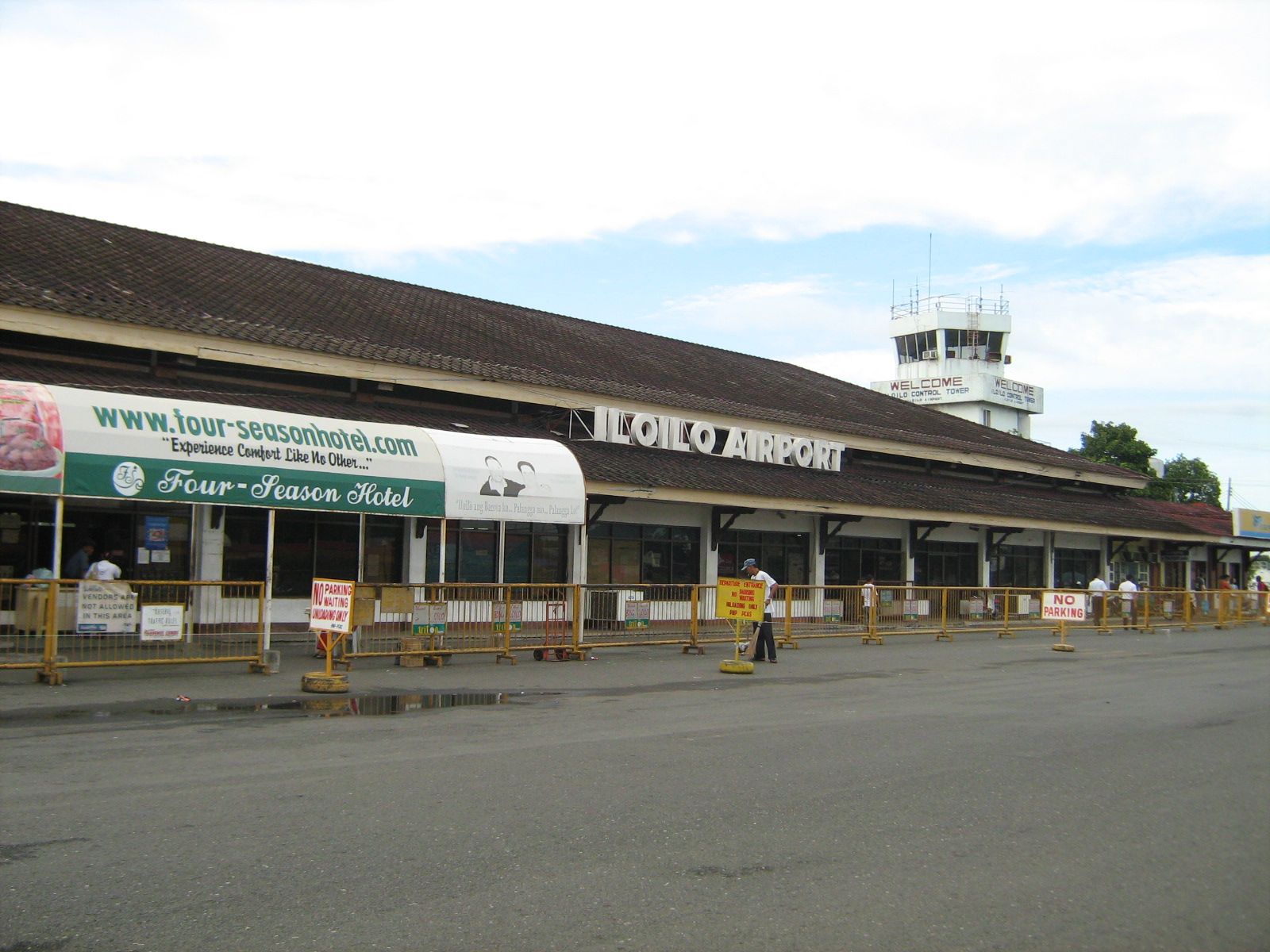
By the 1990s, Mandurriao Airport was faced with a myriad of problems which warranted its eventual closure.

Prior to the construction of Iloilo International Airport, Iloilo City was served by Mandurriao Airport, located in the Mandurriao district of Iloilo City, which had been in operation since 1937. Though continually expanded in order to accommodate the changing demands of the city throughout much of its history, Iloilo City's rapid urbanization had made this feat impossible by the 1990s. The 2,202-square-meter (23,700 sq ft) terminal building, constructed in 1982 to handle the passenger demands of a single airline, (Philippine Airlines, being the Philippines' aviation monopoly at the time), was unable to cope with the liberalization of the Philippine aviation industry and the subsequent boom in air travel, when as many as four airlines served the airport at the same time and where the passenger terminal needed to have an area of at least 7,800 square meters (84,000 sq ft) in order to absorb all peak-hour demand.

The airport's problems continued to linger with it into the new millennium. The increasing incidence of terrorism in the Philippines for example forced aviation officials to restrict airport access only to passengers, the sealing of doors and windows at airport terminals being an essential component thereof. However, the airport's architecture (which took advantage of natural ventilation) and lack of air conditioning made the airport's pre-departure and arrival areas very uncomfortable for passengers to stay in. To counteract this, the Air Transportation Office (the forerunner of the Civil Aviation Authority of the Philippines) installed six air-conditioning units at the pre-departure area. Although the installed units were able to provide a degree of comfort to passengers, the ATO recognized that their efforts were inadequate: in order to effectively provide a comfortable environment for passengers throughout the entire terminal building, twenty-three air conditioners needed to be installed. Passenger complaints meanwhile were not limited to just the lack of air conditioning: despite the existence of a baggage X-ray machine, passengers flying other airlines were forced to have their baggage manually checked as the machine was ostensibly for the sole use of Philippine Airlines passengers.

In addition to problems with the terminal building, both the airport's location and surrounding infrastructure were the subject of much complaint as well. For one, although some 1,700 cars visited the airport daily, the parking lot had only 129 slots, and could not be expanded any further. The airport complex likewise was located directly alongside major city thoroughfares, in particular the city's main highway, the Tomas Confesor Highway, which complicated the flow of traffic in and around the area. At one point, the ATO, which was already having difficulty managing vehicular traffic around the airport, proposed banning cargo and delivery trucks from passing through the road in front of the terminal building. However, the city government did not respond.

Beset with a myriad of problems, authorities eventually concluded that a new airport had to be built outside the city, selecting the municipality of Cabatuan as the site of the new Iloilo International Airport. The airport's location was also the site of Cabatuan Airfield, a World War II airfield built primarily in Barangay Tiring but also spread out to adjacent Barangays Duyan-Duyan, Gaub, Tabucan, and Manguna, all located in the same municipality.

=== Planning and construction ===
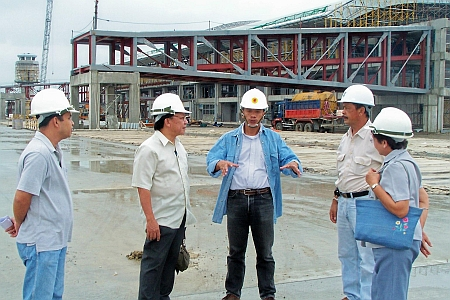
Construction work at the Iloilo International Airport site in July 2006. In the second image, officials from the Philippine Information Agency are being briefed by airport project managers on the progress of the airport's construction.

In October 1995, the Iloilo city government announced its intention to construct a new airport outside the city in cooperation with the private sector. Although two sites were initially proposed: north of the city in Cabatuan and south of the city in the province of Guimaras, the ATO decided to keep the airport in Iloilo, citing the lack of demand in Guimaras to justify construction there. The Regional Development Council for Western Visayas (RDC) later endorsed the project to the National Economic and Development Authority (NEDA) for its approval in July 1997. Despite the endorsements, the NEDA, citing an internal rate of return below the set "hurdle rate" of fifteen percent and the impossibility of acquiring some 415 hectares (1,030 acres) of land for the project in one year, rejected the airport proposal in February 1998, and the project was subsequently excluded from the 1998 development cooperation program of the German government.

Concurrently with the planning of the new airport, the Japan International Cooperation Agency (JICA) initiated a study on the master planning and long-term development plans of four key domestic airports in the Philippines. The report cited Mandurriao Airport, Bacolod City Domestic Airport, Legazpi Airport and Daniel Z. Romualdez Airport in Tacloban City as these key domestic airports, noting the high growth of passenger and cargo volume there and the eventual need for expansion. Heeding the recommendations of the JICA report, President Joseph Estrada signed a memorandum in November 1998 creating the Iloilo Airport Coordinating Committee, headed by Iloilo-born senator Franklin Drilon. The coordinating committee decided that a new airport was needed for Iloilo City as Mandurriao Airport was deemed unexpandable due to operational obstacles and the presence of slums and other natural and civic structures that would restrict expansion efforts. In addition, the committee, objecting to the idea that the new airport would serve merely as a reliever for the new Bacolod airport, successfully lobbied for an international airport to be built in lieu of a domestic one. The project finally received NEDA approval in March 2000, with Cabatuan as the location of the new airport based on a study performed by both the DOTC and the JICA later that year.

Although multiple funding sources were originally considered by the NEDA to fund the airport's construction, it was decided that the project should avail of an official development assistance facility offered by the Japanese government through the then-newly formed Japan Bank for International Cooperation (JBIC). After almost two years of negotiations, and after initially refusing to bankroll the project, the JBIC extended a 6.2 billion peso (US$152 million) loan to the Philippine government in August 2000.

The Iloilo International Airport project was inaugurated by President Gloria Macapagal Arroyo on January 25, 2004, and construction work on the new airport started on April 14 that year. The original expected deadline of completion was June 2007, although this was moved to the first quarter of 2007. A joint venture between the Taisei Corporation and the Shimizu Corporation of Japan served as the contractor for the project, with Phil-Japan Airport Consultants, Inc. managing the project and serving as the government's consultant to the project. The project was 75 percent complete as of July 14, 2006, and fully completed by March 18, 2007. While construction was completed ahead of schedule, the airport was constructed over budget, with a final cost of around 8.8 billion pesos ($201 million) caused by increases in the cost of civil works and consultancy services.

=== Naming ===
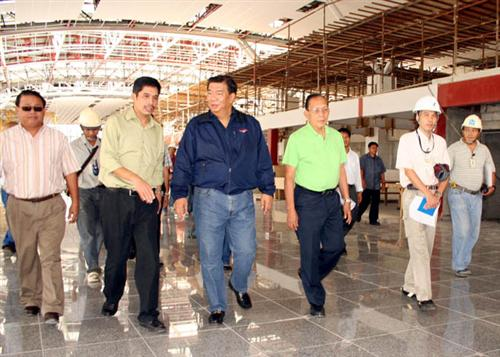
Senator Franklin Drilon inspecting the construction, 2006

During construction, the airport was officially called the New Iloilo Airport Development Project, or NIADP. However, as the airport was nearing completion, there were three main contenders for the airport's name: Iloilo International Airport, the original name of the airport which had the support of the Iloilo provincial and city governments; Panay International Airport, proposed by the President and supported by the RDC, which at the time was led by Antique governor Salvacion Perez; and Graciano Lopez-Jaena International Airport, named after the Iloilo-born Graciano López Jaena, proposed by the Dr. Graciano Lopez-Jaena Foundation with the support of the RDC and Antique governor Perez, who is also a member of the foundation, and endorsed by the National Historical Institute.

Out of the two proposals, the name Panay International Airport was dropped due to opposition by the Iloilo city and provincial governments, the Sangguniang Panlungsod of Iloilo City, the mayor of Cabatuan and Justice Secretary Raul Gonzalez, all citing that it is illogical to rename an airport after an island as large as Panay. Prospects for Graciano Lopez-Jaena International Airport were better, with then Iloilo governor Niel Tupas, Sr. saying that the feasibility of renaming the airport after López Jaena or any other Ilonggo should be studied first.

Local newspaper The News Today issued an informal survey asking Iloilo City residents what should be the name of the airport and why. Although the survey is non-scientific, a plurality of the nineteen respondents suggested that the name be kept as Iloilo International Airport.

More recently, after the opening of the airport, the local government of Cabatuan suggested renaming the airport after Tomas Confesor, a native of Cabatuan who once served as governor of Iloilo, a senator, and is known for being one of the founders of the Boy Scouts of the Philippines. This was opposed by Tupas' successor, Arthur Defensor, Sr., who says that the current name has geographic value. Opposition to the proposed name change has also come from Senator Drilon, the Iloilo Business Club, and the regional office of the Department of Tourism.

=== Inauguration and start of operations ===
Accompanied by national and local officials, President Gloria Macapagal Arroyo at ribbon cutting ceremony, June 13, 2007

Iloilo International Airport was originally scheduled to open on March 19, 2007, when its inaugural flight would land; however, this was moved to April 16, with commercial operations commencing on April 21. This date was likewise scrapped due to the inability of the President to attend because of the hospitalization of First Gentleman Jose Miguel Arroyo, with a new date scheduled for sometime in late April. Some sources indicated that the airport would open on May 10, 2007, during a major TEAM Unity rally in Iloilo City that President Arroyo was expected to attend, although this date was not considered in favor of a date after the 2007 elections, specifically in June, in order to avoid political overtones from dominating the airport's opening. The final date chosen for the airport's inauguration was June 13, 2007, with commercial services commencing the next day. By that time, airlines had already transferred their offices to the new airport.

The airport was formally opened on June 13 with the arrival of the presidential aircraft at the new airport at around 9:50 am PST, with Governor Tupas leading provincial and city officials in welcoming the President to the new facility. The inauguration of the new airport also included figures such as Japanese ambassador Ryuchiro Yamazaki and Transportation and Communications Secretary Leandro Mendoza, who assisted the President in leading the inaugural rites. The facility itself was formally commissioned at 5:00 am PST on June 14, coinciding with the simultaneous decommissioning of Mandurriao Airport. The first commercial flight to land at the new airport was Air Philippines Flight 987, a Boeing 737-200 that departed from Ninoy Aquino International Airport (Manila) and landed at 6:05 am PST the same day.

Operations on the first day of the airport's commercial activity ran smoothly, although a baggage conveyor belt and X-ray machines malfunctioned due to a sudden surge in passengers trying to catch their early morning flights. Some tension marred the airport's first day after baggage porters who worked at the old airport insisted on working at the new airport. The ATO, DOTC and the porters have since agreed to a closed-door conference and later on to refer the problem to DOTC Assistant Secretary Eduardo "Red" Kapunan, the person in charge of international airports in the Philippines.

=== Future expansion and development ===
Rear façade of the passenger terminal building

Since the opening of Iloilo International Airport, the airport has operated beyond its designed annual capacity of 1.2 million passengers. By 2019, the airport handled more than two million passengers. Plans to expand the airport were laid as early as February 2016, to be implemented under a public-private partnership (PPP) scheme. The project would have cost ₱30.40 billion and would involve the expansion of the passenger terminal and other facilities. It also included a 30-year concession contract to operate and maintain the airport.

In December 2018, Prime Asset Ventures, Inc. (PAVI) — a subsidiary of the Villar Group of Companies of businessman and former senator Manny Villar — submitted an unsolicited proposal (USP) to operate, maintain, and expand the airport, valued at ₱6.89 billion. The Civil Aviation Authority of the Philippines (CAAP) granted the original proponent status to the proposal in May 2019.

Another plan was announced in October 2022, when the Department of Transportation (DOTr) announced the airport's inclusion on the list of airports in the PPP pipeline for the upgrading and expansion of airports. By December 2022, CAAP asserted the need for expansion as travel demand returns to its pre-COVID-19 pandemic levels.

In April 2023, Aboitiz InfraCapital, Inc. of the Aboitiz Group submitted a USP to undertake the redevelopment of Iloilo International Airport, valued at ₱9.95 billion. After Cebu Pacific announced the resumption of international flights from Iloilo to Hong Kong and Singapore — which had been suspended since 2020 due to the COVID-19 pandemic, Iloilo City Mayor Jerry Treñas emphasized the need for a larger airport to accommodate the influx of passengers and increase in cargo traffic. He has urged the DOTr to expedite the proposed expansion and repairs of the airport's facilities.

In October 2024, PAVI holds the original proponent status for the ₱20.85 billion upgrade of the airport. If no other companies submit a counteroffer during the Swiss challenge, PAVI will retain its status as the original project proponent. The DOTr plans to award the concession for the rehabilitation of the Iloilo International Airport in 2025.

While the approval of the USPs for the airport's expansion is still pending, the CAAP indicated that several facility upgrade projects for the airport are planned in the interim, supported by a proposed budget of ₱645 million allocated by the Department of Budget and Management (DBM). The total cost to rehabilitate and expand the airport's facilities, including the proposed projects, is pegged at ₱14.7 billion, according to a report from the CAAP.

== Structure ==
=== Runway ===
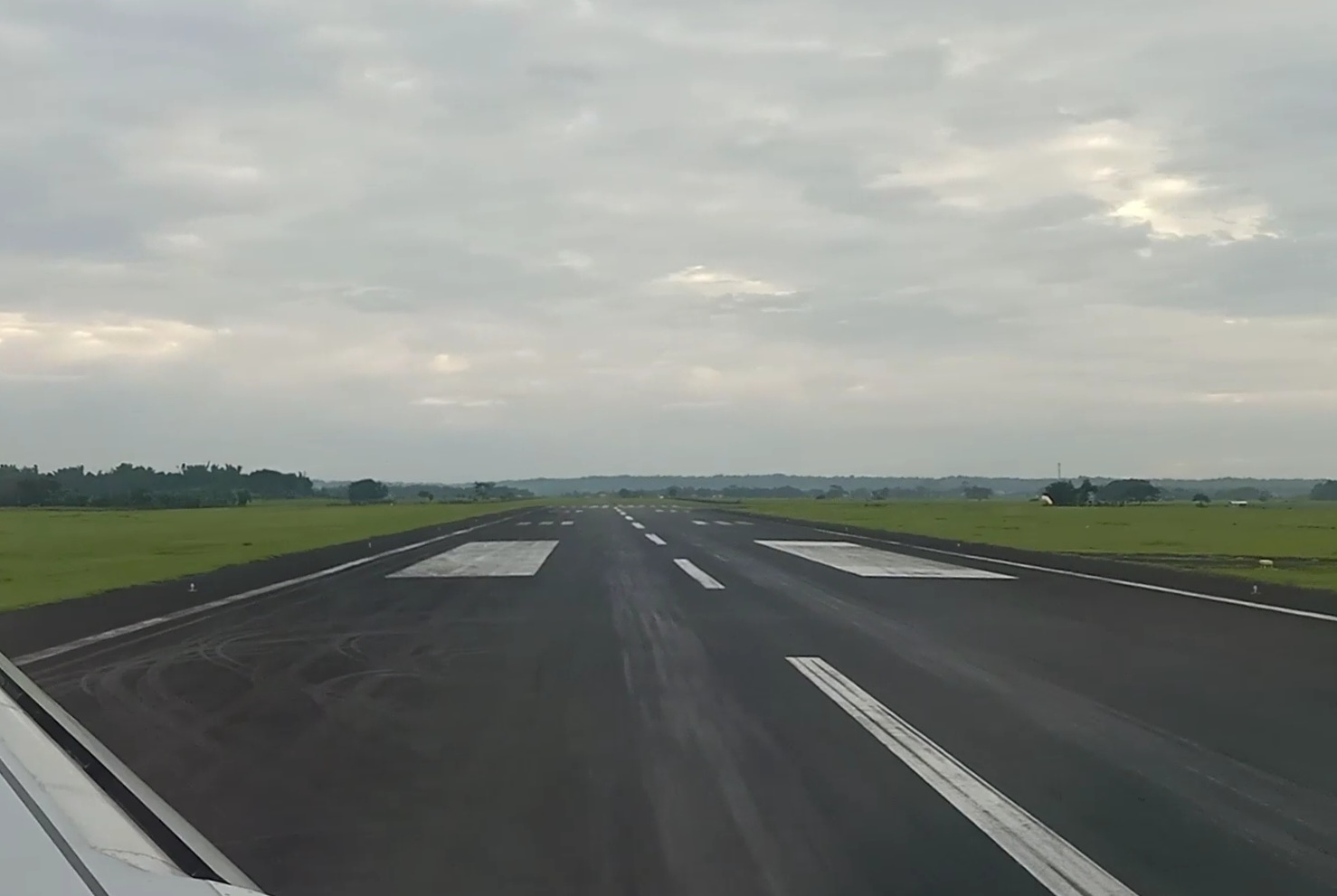
Airport runway

Iloilo International Airport has one primary 2,500-meter (8,200 ft) runway 45 meters (148 ft) wide. The runway runs at a direction of 02°/20°, the same as Mandurriao Airport. However, unlike the runway at Mandurriao, the longer runway at Iloilo International Airport can support widebodied aircraft such as the Airbus A330, Airbus A340, Airbus A350 XWB, Airbus A380, Boeing 777 (with reduced payload for the -300 series or -200 series), Boeing 767, Boeing 757, Antonov An-124 Ruslan, McDonnell Douglas MD-11, Boeing 787. This was proven when an Airbus A310 and a Boeing C-17 Globemaster III (designated as an Airbus CC-150 Polaris and CC-177 Globemaster III, respectively) belonging to the Royal Canadian Air Force, landed at the airport to deploy Canadian troops for relief operations in the wake of Typhoon Haiyan.

Runway lights and an Instrument Landing System were installed, making the airport capable of supporting low-visibility and night landings under any weather conditions.

=== Terminals ===
==== Passenger terminal ====
Pre-departure area of Iloilo International Airport.

The airport has a 13,700-square-meter (147,000 sq ft) main passenger terminal designed to accommodate around 1.2 million passengers annually. Regarded as one of the most beautifully designed airport terminals in the Philippines, its architectural style is said to be reminiscent of Hong Kong International Airport, albeit on a smaller scale. It is divided into three levels: arrivals and baggage claim on the first floor, check-in on the second floor and departures on the third floor. The pre-departure area at Iloilo International Airport has a capacity of 436 passengers. Three jet bridges protrude from the terminal above a 48,000-square-meter (520,000 sq ft) apron, enabling Iloilo International Airport to handle up to six aircraft simultaneously. When fully extended, the jet bridges stretch to a length of 35 meters (115 ft).

The terminal is equipped with six X-ray machines, as well as escalators and staircases for departing and arriving passengers' use. There are also two elevators, one for very important persons and one for disabled passengers. Two pocket gardens have been installed at the terminal, one each for both the departure and arrival halls. The building features ten modern check-in counters with LCD monitors. The terminal makes extensive use of natural lighting, designed for energy efficiency. Other amenities available to passengers include a special smoking room, a duty-free shop, a VIP lounge, a Mabuhay Lounge for Philippine Airlines business class passengers and counters for hotel and car rental bookings, as well as areas for airport stores and payphones.

On August 5, 2016, the CAAP launched the airport's free wireless Internet network, in cooperation with PLDT and Smart Communications.

==== Cargo terminal ====
Iloilo International Airport has a 1,281-square-meter (13,790 sq ft) cargo terminal, designed to handle up to 11,500 tonnes (11,300 long tons; 12,700 short tons) of cargo annually. The three-storey building, built in an architectural style similar to that of the main terminal building, has a covered platform, bathrooms, government offices and cargo handling areas, as well as its own parking lot. Airline offices also occupy the structure, secured by means of a perimeter fence with a guard house.

=== Other structures ===
Control tower

Iloilo International Airport has a 35-meter (115 ft) tall control tower equipped with air navigation equipment and radar systems. A briefing room for pilots is found inside the control tower. Additionally, the airport complex has a fire station equipped with three fire trucks, a maintenance building, a mechanical building and an administrative building. In front of the passenger terminal is a 415-slot parking lot for the use of passengers, employees and airport visitors.

The airport has a power back-up system and a power generating station that enables the airport to run in the event of a power outage, returning the supply of electric power to the facility within three seconds. The airport has water treatment facilities and a 6-hectare (15-acre) man-made pond used for flood control and drainage purposes as well as for the irrigation of nearby farmland. A waste treatment and sorting facility on the airport grounds converts solid waste into fertilizer for the use of surrounding farms.

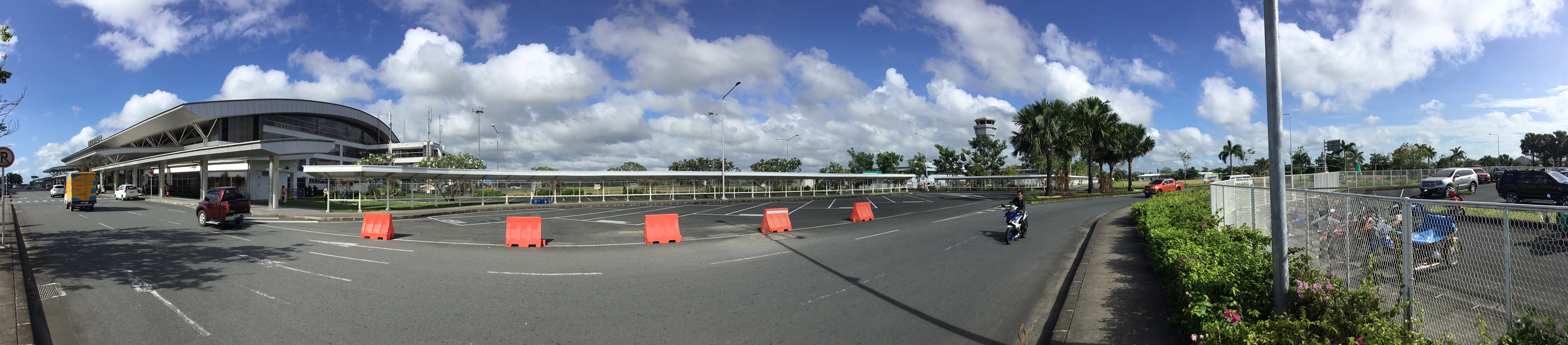
Panoramic view of airport

== Airlines and destinations ==
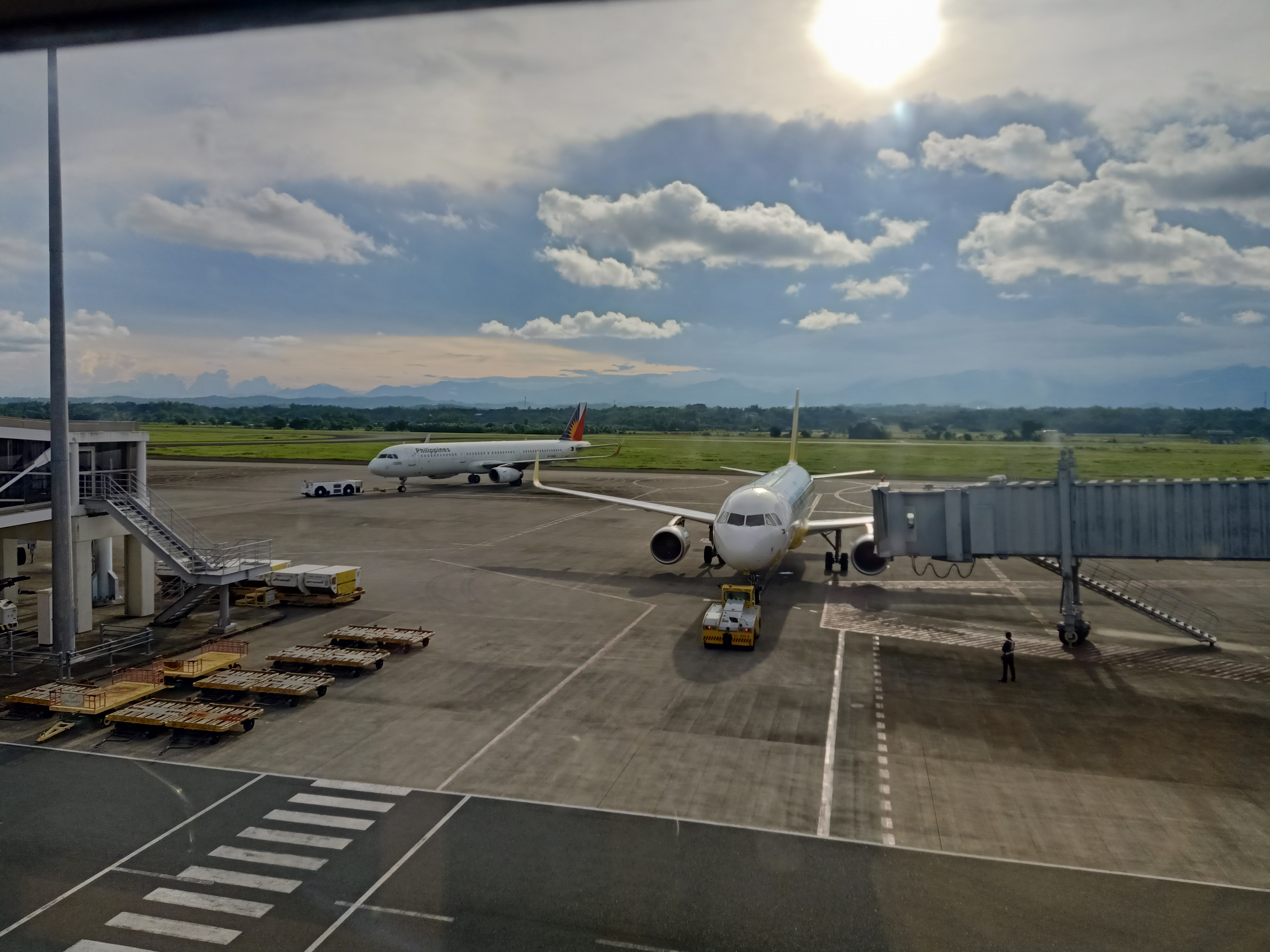
An Airbus A321 of Philippine Airlines (PAL Express) and A320 of Cebu Pacific at the apron.

Airlines	Destinations
Cebgo	Cagayan de Oro, Davao, Legazpi, Tacloban, Tagbilaran
Cebu Pacific	Bangkok–Don Mueang (resumes November 23, 2026), Cebu, Clark, Davao, General Santos, Hong Kong, Manila, Puerto Princesa, Singapore (resumes November 23, 2026)
PAL Express	Cebu, Manila
Philippines AirAsia	Manila
Scoot	Singapore

In 2011, Iloilo International Airport serviced an average of 42 flights daily on four domestic routes. At the time of its opening, the ATO believed that international flights out of and to the airport might not begin until 2008, although international passenger flights could commence once Iloilo International Airport meets ICAO standards. A study was conducted on the feasibility of the airport serving international flights, and the CAAP announced that year that the airport met ICAO standards, allowing for international flights to land at the airport.

The DOTC plans to stage international cargo flights out of the airport, as sixty percent of Philippine seafood exports come from Panay. Japan and Hong Kong have been cited as potential first destinations of these cargo flights.

On January 31, 2008, the Iloilo city government announced that Cebu Pacific was considering starting international services from Iloilo, initially with a route to Hong Kong to cater to the large number of Overseas Filipinos there. Philippine Airlines later announced its intent to serve this route as well, suggesting that Iloilo tourism authorities mount thrice-weekly charter flights to the city using PAL Airbus A320 aircraft. City government officials also believed that the opening of a Cathay Pacific office in Iloilo City may bode well for future service to Hong Kong. In addition to Hong Kong flights, the Center for Research and Communication of the University of Asia and the Pacific has called for flights from Iloilo City to Japan, South Korea and mainland China. The first international flight from Iloilo International Airport departed on November 8, 2012, to Hong Kong.

PAL Express, a subsidiary of Philippine Airlines, once considered a direct route from Iloilo to Malay to boost Boracay-bound tourism traffic. A resolution passed by the Iloilo City Local Development Council (ICLDC) called on PAL president (now DOTr Secretary) Jaime Bautista to institute direct flights to Malay from Iloilo, with onward service to Cebu City on the return portion from Malay. However, PAL has questioned the route's feasibility, citing congestion at Godofredo P. Ramos Airport which serves that municipality. Nearly ten years after initial service was discussed, on March 20, 2017, leisure carrier Air Juan became the first airline to launch scheduled service between the two airports, as well as launching additional service to Cuyo in Palawan, and supplementary service to Sipalay in Negros Occidental.

In March 2020, international flights were suspended as a response to the COVID-19 pandemic. Amid the 2022 monkeypox outbreak and its associated health risks, Iloilo Governor Arthur Defensor Jr. announced that the airport would remain closed to international flights. As travel restrictions gradually eased, authorities in Western Visayas began working in June 2023 to revive international flights after successfully reviving key domestic routes from Clark International Airport to three destinations in the region. International flights officially resumed on October 27, 2024.

Scoot, the low-cost subsidiary of the Singapore Airlines Group, launched direct flights to Iloilo on April 14, 2025, to compete with Cebu Pacific in this route. Scoot is the first foreign carrier to launch flights to the airport.

== Statistics ==
Data from Civil Aviation Authority of the Philippines (CAAP).

Year	Passenger movements				Aircraft movements				Cargo movements (in kg)			
Year	Domestic	International	Total	% change	Domestic	International	Total	% change	Domestic	International	Total	% change
2007	1,002,618		1,002,618	▲15.99	10,532		10,532	▲14.13	10,104,427		10,104,427	▲1.85
2008	1,073,907		1,073,907	▲7.11	12,160		12,160	▲15.46	9,360,273		9,360,273	▼7.36
2009	1,324,148		1,324,148	▲23.30	8,440		8,440	▼30.59	7,483,077		7,483,077	▼20.05
2010	1,498,695		1,498,695	▲13.18	16,034		16,034	▲89.98	11,820,227		11,820,227	▲57.96
2011	1,707,969		1,707,969	▲13.96	10,094		10,094	▼37.05	11,601,045		11,601,045	▼1.85
2012	1,854,427		1,854,427	▲8.57	18,208		18,208	▲80.38	12,961,254		12,961,254	▲11.72
2013	1,639,364	48,734	1,688,098	▼8.97	23,700	474	24,174	▲32.77	12,959,967	—	12,959,967	▼0.01
2014	1,621,650	55,982	1,677,632	▼0.62	17,192	494	17,686	▼26.84	15,292,992	—	15,292,992	▲18.00
2015	1,854,126	61,696	1,915,822	▲14.20	21,342	566	21,908	▲23.87	12,920,439	—	12,920,439	▼15.51
2016	1,874,922	68,797	1,943,719	▲1.46	19,463	590	20,053	▼8.47	13,338,851	—	13,338,851	▲3.24
2017	1,954,813	68,203	2,023,016	▲4.08	20,530	507	21,037	▲4.91	15,494,800	—	15,494,800	▲16.16
2018	2,215,074	80,909	2,295,983	▲13.49	22,691	636	23,327	▲10.89	22,616,854	183,215	22,800,069	▲47.15
2019	2,754,772	80,126	2,834,898	▲23.47	22,091	598	22,689	▼2.74	16,157,385	133,255	16,290,640	▼28.55
2020	666,385	20,193	686,578	▼75.78	7,664	93	7,757	▼65.81	6,125,541	38,613	6,164,154	▼62.16
2021	341,950	—	341,950	▼50.20	5,090	1	5,091	▼34.37	4,881,693	—	4,881,693	▼20.81
2022	1,708,764	—	1,708,764	▲399.71	14,386	—	14,386	▲182.58	4,243,113	—	4,243,113	▼13.08
2023	2,330,053	—	2,330,053	▲36.35	17,450	—	17,450	▲21.30	2,077,315	—	2,077,315	▼51.04
2024	2,774,097	13,694	2,787,791	▲19.64	20,365	161	20,526	▲17.63	1,014,115	36,947	1,051,062	▼49.40
2025	2,973,085	128,195	3,101,280	▲11.25	20,477	1,933	22,410	▲9.18	8,026,807	88,046	8,114,853	▲672.06

An em dash (—) is used if data from CAAP is not available.

== Ground transport ==
=== Road ===
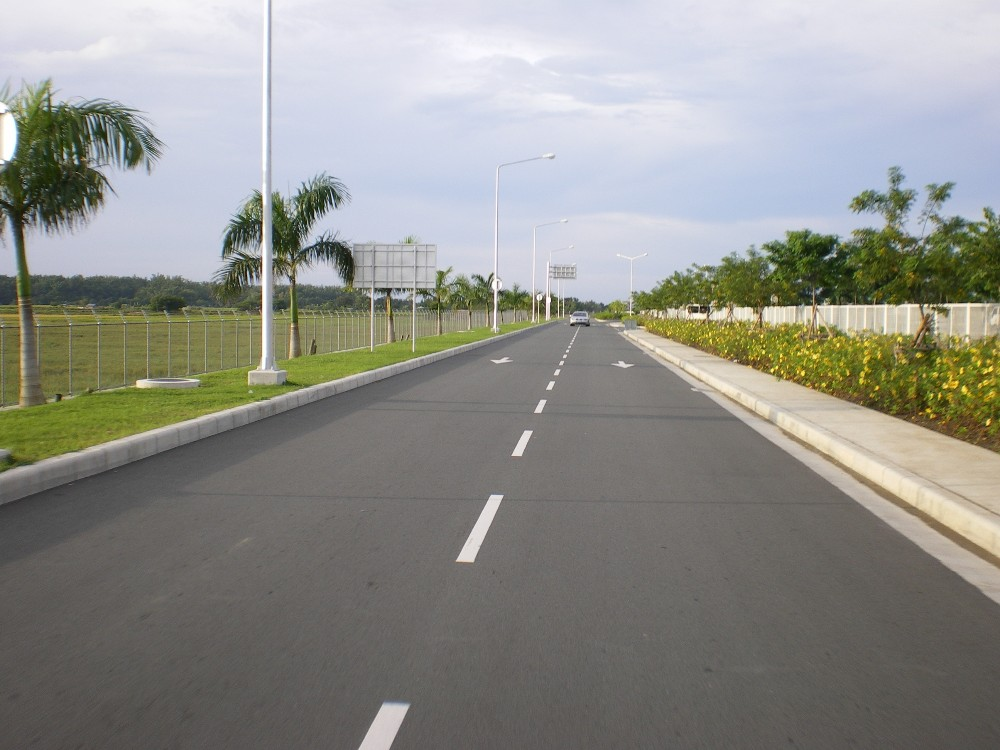
A secondary access road leading to the airport complex. This road branches from the main access road leading to the airport.

Iloilo International Airport is connected to Iloilo City proper via six to eight-lane Benigno S. Aquino Jr. Avenue. At Bangga Dama in Santa Barbara, the Tomas Confesor Highway serves as a bypass access road from the avenue. The access road is approximately 3-kilometer (1.9 mi) long and 30-meter (98 ft) wide, allowing for four lanes of traffic. The estimated travel time from Iloilo City Proper to the airport is around thirty minutes.

To relieve crowding on the main access road during peak hours, a 3.2-kilometer (2.0 mi) secondary access road was constructed, connecting the airport to Cabatuan proper through Barangay Duyan-Duyan. The 124 million-peso ($2.6 million) road is expected to improve connectivity between the airport and both northern Iloilo and southern Capiz, as well as reduce travel times from there to the airport by at least fifteen minutes. The two-lane road opened in July 2010.

=== Public transportation ===
When the airport opened in 2007, no franchises for transport services to the airport have been granted yet by the Land Transportation Franchising and Regulatory Board (LTFRB), although public transport routes to and from the airport were being studied. Some transport operators, however, have expressed interest in starting shuttle services to the airport from Iloilo City, while others have drawn proposals for public transport routes from Iloilo City directly to the airport. A shuttle service is currently available to the airport from Iloilo City, with pick-up and drop-off points at SM City Iloilo and Jaro Plaza. Aside from shuttle services, P2P buses can be used by travelers going to Iloilo Business Park and vice versa, which was launched July 2019.

Taxi cabs in Iloilo may be hired to get from the airport to Iloilo City Proper or vice versa. The taxi drivers will most likely opt for a fixed rate rather than using the taxi meter. The taxi fare going to the airport from Iloilo City Proper range between 350 and 400 pesos as of 2016.

Iloilo International Airport is accessible via jeepney to Santa Barbara town proper, after which travelers may take a share taxi to the airport. Travelers may also take jeepneys en route to Cabatuan, Calinog or Janiuay, all of which stop at Santa Barbara.

=== Future rail ===
A train linking Iloilo International Airport to Iloilo City proper, similar to the Airport Express in Hong Kong and similar systems in other cities, has been proposed. A study to determine the feasibility of a train service has since been commissioned by the city government. Other proposals to connect the airport to the city via rail include the revival of the currently defunct Panay Railways network which has a station in Santa Barbara town proper.

== Accidents and incidents ==
- On October 13, 2017, Cebu Pacific Flight 461, an Airbus A320-200 (registration RP-C3237) from Manila, suffered a runway excursion upon landing. All 180 passengers and six crew members safely evacuated the aircraft. As the airport was closed in order to tow the incident aircraft to the tarmac, seven domestic flights were cancelled, while eleven were re-timed. Other flights were diverted to Roxas Airport, while flights from Hong Kong and back were diverted to Mactan–Cebu International Airport.

== See also ==
- Mandurriao Airport
