= Cabatuan, Iloilo =

Municipality of the Philippines in the province of Iloilo

Cabatuan
- Municipality
- Municipality of Cabatuan
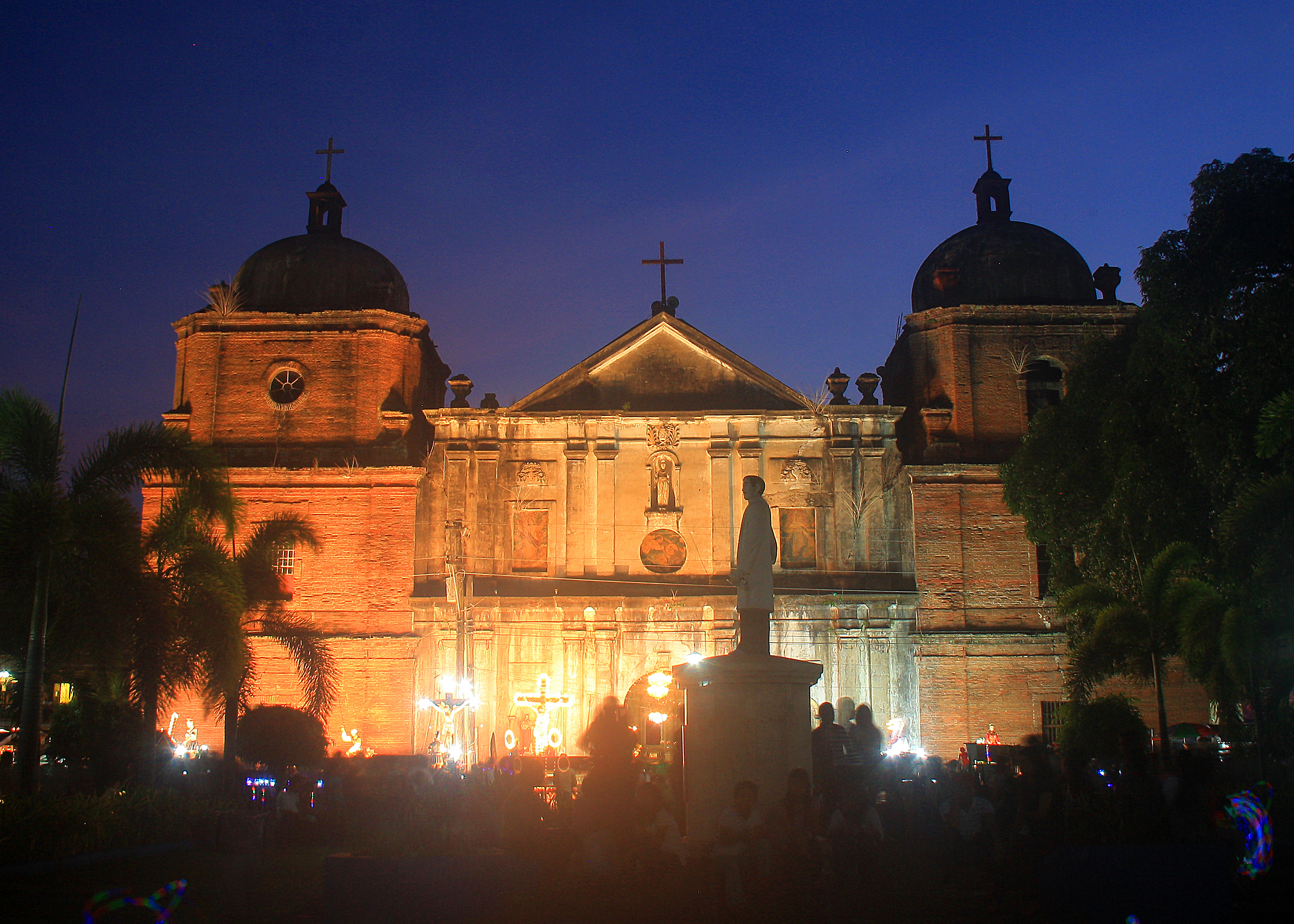
- The Cabatuan Church, at night.

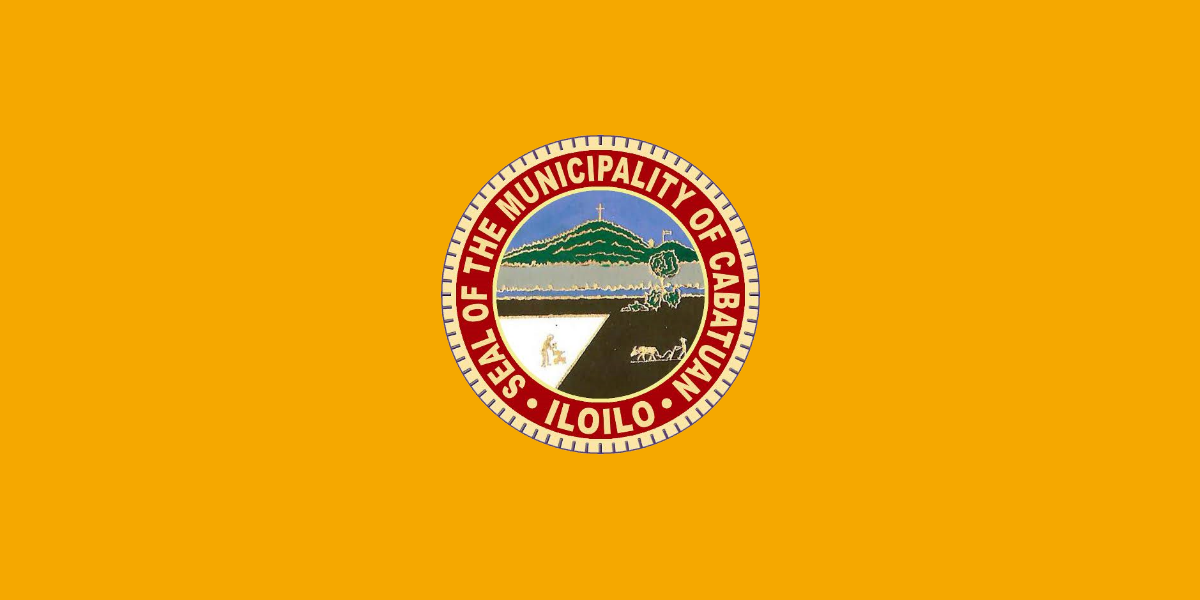
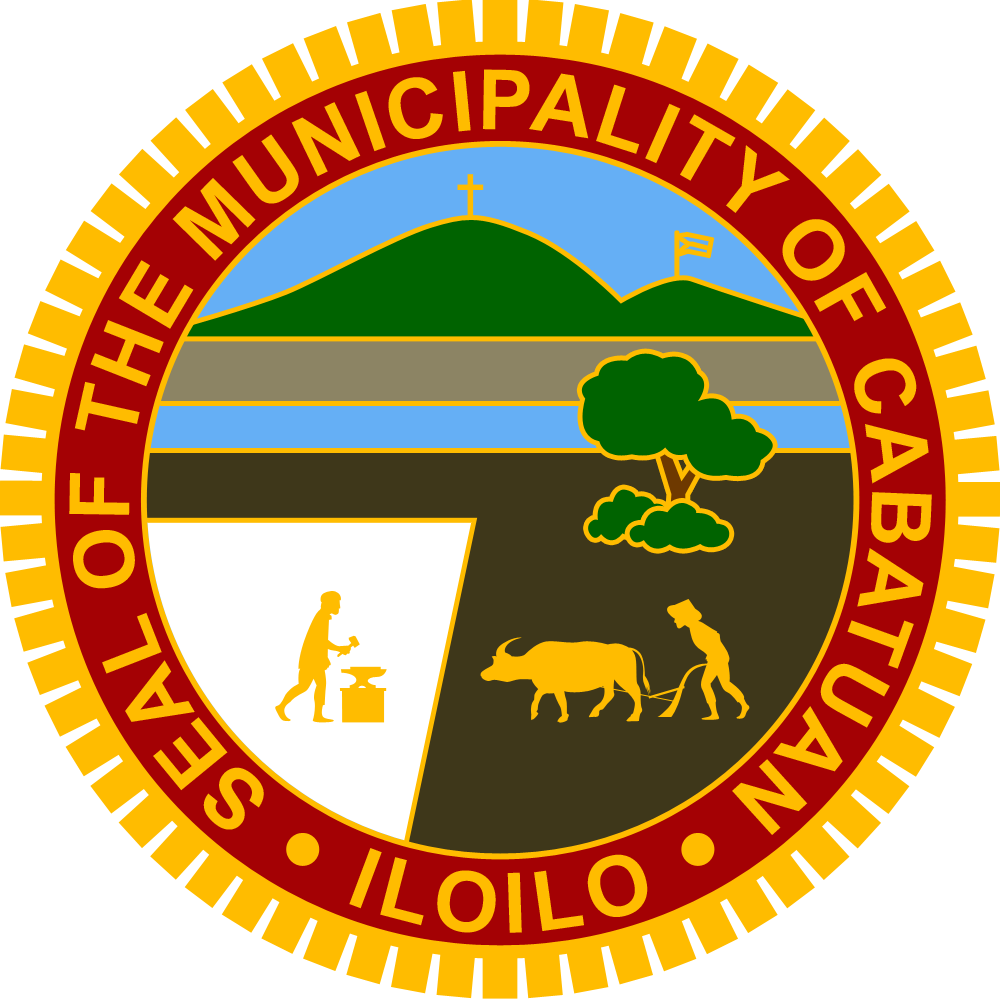
- Flag Seal
- Anthem: Ang Banwa nga Namat-an
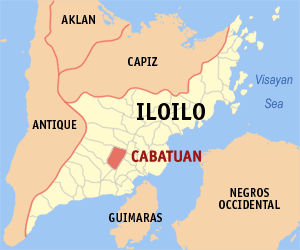
- Map of Iloilo with Cabatuan highlighted
- Interactive map of Cabatuan
- Location within the Philippines
- Coordinates: 10°53′N 122°29′E
- Country: Philippines
- Region: Western Visayas
- Province: Iloilo
- District: 3rd district
- Founded: 1732
- Barangays: 68 (see Barangays)

Government
  - Type: Sangguniang Bayan
  - Mayor: Elizalde G. Pueyo (PFP)
  - Vice Mayor: Patrick Anthony C. Tobias (Ind)
  - Representative: Lorenz R. Defensor (NUP)
  - Municipal Council: Members: Jose Marie V. Lamparero (PFP); Reynalyn N. Echavez (PFP); Eduardo S. Tuares (Ind); Jeebee M. Borbon-Baluyot (PFP); Rizaldy J. Nolasco (PFP); Noemi C. Lujan (Nacionalista); Fe V. Tobias (PFP); Jacinto O. Parcon (PFP); Roel H. Tamorite ^{‡}; Jelani M. Borbon ^{◌}; ‡ ex officio ABC president; ◌ ex officio SK chairman
  - Electorate: 36,981 voters (2025)

Area
  - Total: 112.90 km^{2} (43.59 sq mi)
- Elevation: 78 m (256 ft)
- Highest elevation: 204 m (669 ft)
- Lowest elevation: 34 m (112 ft)

Population (2024 census)
  - Total: 62,717
  - Density: 555.51/km^{2} (1,438.8/sq mi)
  - Households: 14,784
- Demonym: Cabatuananon

Economy
  - Income class: 1st municipal income class
  - Poverty incidence: 10.41% (2023)
  - Revenue: ₱ 245.1 million (2023, 2024)
  - Assets: ₱ 870.8 million (2024)
  - Expenditure: ₱ 84.18 million (2023, 2024)
  - Liabilities: ₱ 313.5 million (2024)

Service provider
  - Electricity: Iloilo 1 Electric Cooperative (ILECO 1)
- Time zone: UTC+8 (PST)
- ZIP code: 5031
- PSGC: 063012000
- IDD : area code: +63 (0)33
- Native languages: Kinaray-a; Hiligaynon; Ati; Tagalog
- Website: cabatuan.gov.ph

Cabatuan, officially the Municipality of Cabatuan (Hiligaynon: Banwa sang Cabatuan, Kinaray-a: Banwa kang Cabatuan; Tagalog: Bayan ng Cabatuan), is a municipality in the province of Iloilo, Philippines. According to the 2024 census, it has a population of 62,717 people. It is located 24 kilometres (15 mi) northwest of Iloilo City and was part of the Metro Iloilo–Guimaras area.

It is mainly agricultural with 8,251.18 hectares (20,389.1 acres) of agricultural land. Certain crops are abundantly produced including rice, corn, sweet potato, taro, and cassava. Sugar cane, coffee, tropical fruits and vegetables, and coconut are also produced in certain areas. The locals also earn from livestock and poultry. Moreover, the land is also an excellent source of gravel and sand for the production of concrete.

== History ==
Residents believe that the name Cabatuan may have originated from three local dialect terms reflecting aspects of its prehistoric landscape. It could derive from (1) CaBatuan, meaning a large area of rocks; (2) Batuan, meaning to fight, defy, or oppose; or (3) Batu-an, a sour-fruit-bearing evergreen tree that grew abundantly in the region. Another theory, however, suggests that the name was derived from "naga-batu" (fighting or opposing) which is used to describe a creek in the town that flowed from east to west opposite to that of the usual flows of the rivers in the region. The municipality's name is distinguished from a municipality of the same name in Isabela, Luzon.

The town of Cabatuan was originally known for the "Sinulugans," hillside tribesmen who annually performed the "Sinulog," or Dance of Death, featuring sword-fighting rituals. The area was also inhabited by tulisanes (bandits) and rustlers before the arrival of the Spaniards in 1732.

The town was founded on April 9, 1732, after a molave cross (with only its base currently existing) was planted on the peak of Pamul-ogan Hill. It was originally planned by Tono whose statue now stands in front of the Municipal Building. He was then a town leader together with two other leaders Gomoc and Amihan. This early settlement was then flourishing on a level zone of land near the northern bank of the Tigum River where the poblacion or the commercial center of the town is now located.

In 1733, Cabatuan was officially organized upon the installation of Rev. Fr. Antonio Lopez as its first priest and Tono as its first "gobernadorcillo". Furthermore, the town was placed by the priest under the spiritual protection of Saint Nicholas de Tolentino whom Cabatuananons venerate as their Patron Saint whose feast is celebrated from September 1–10 every year through a 10-day celebration that is grandiosely culminated on September 10 by the highly anticipated Tinuom Festival patterned from Iloilo's Kasadyahan Festival.

In 1903, after the census had been taken, the neighbouring town of Maasin, with a population of 8401, was temporarily annexed to Cabatuan that had a population of 16,497.

During the Second World War, Cabatuan officially became the last defense of Western Visayas against the Japanese forces which led to the destruction of most of its edifices.

Lt. Col. Ryoichi Tozuka, the commander of the Imperial Japanese Army in Panay Island, signed the document of surrender at Cabatuan Airfield, on September 2, 1945, the same day as the surrender signing in Japan aboard the U.S.S. Missouri. This was accepted by Col. Raymond G. Stanton, comdg the 160th U.S. Infantry regiment, and was attended by Rear Admiral Ralph O. Davis, commanding the U.S. Navy's 13th Amphibious Group, and by Brig. Gen. Donald J. Myers, commanding the 40th Infantry Division. The 13th Amphibious Group was tasked to transport the 40th U.S. Infantry Division to Korea.

In modern times, Cabatuan serves as a gateway to Iloilo, being the location of the new Iloilo International Airport.

== Geography ==
Cabatuan is described as a cultural and religious town in the heart of Panay Island, located along a branch of the Suage River, 24 kilometres (15 mi) from Iloilo City, the capital of Iloilo province.

=== Barangays ===
Cabatuan is politically subdivided into 68 barangays. Each barangay consists of puroks and some have sitios.

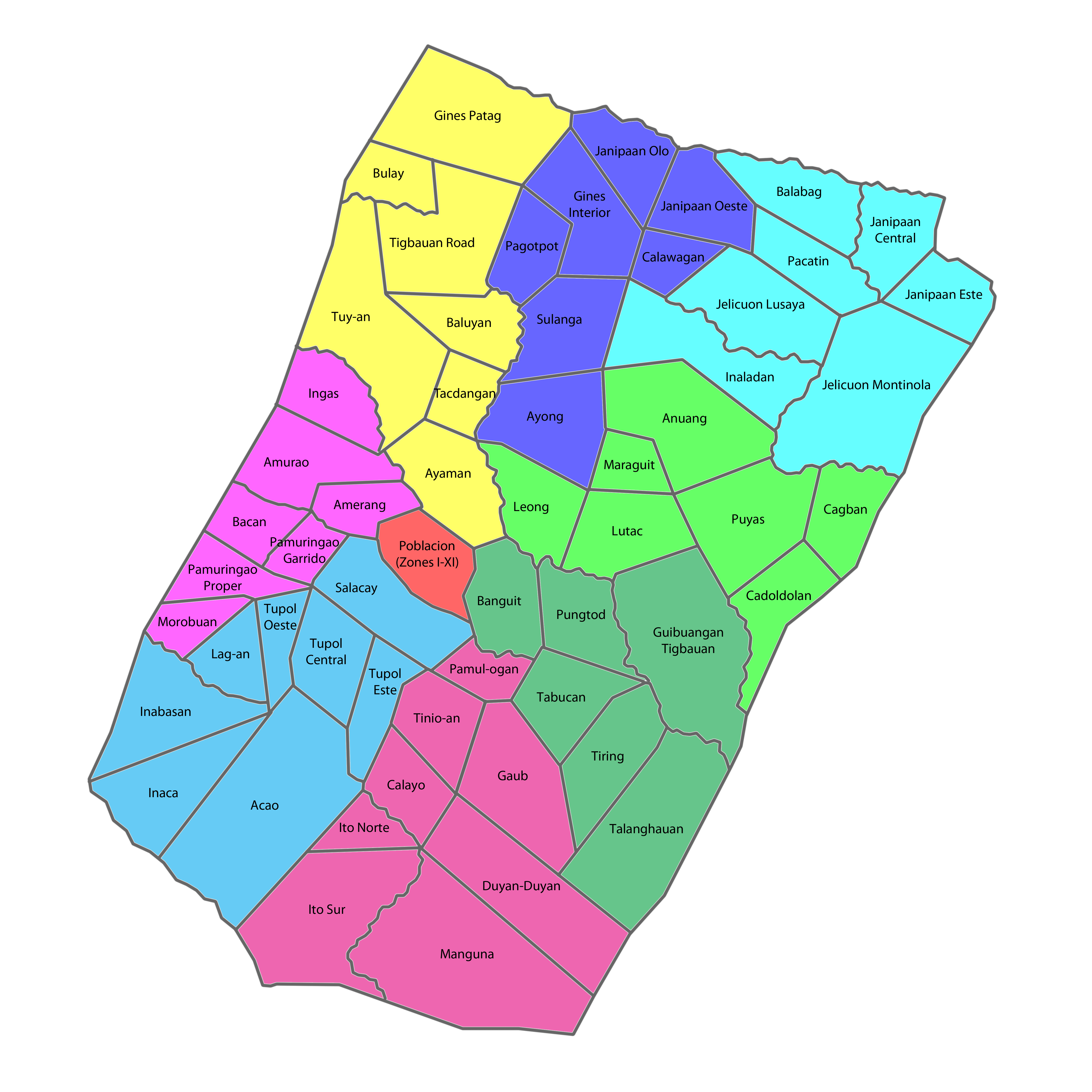
Political Map of Cabatuan, Iloilo

- Acao
- Amerang
- Amurao
- Anuang
- Ayaman
- Ayong
- Bacan
- Balabag
- Baluyan
- Banguit
- Bulay
- Cadoldolan
- Cagban
- Calawagan
- Calayo
- Duyan-Duyan
- Gaub
- Gines Interior
- Gines Patag
- Guibuangan Tigbauan
- Inabasan
- Inaca
- Inaladan
- Ingas
- Ito Norte
- Ito Sur
- Janipaan Central
- Janipaan Este
- Janipaan Oeste
- Janipaan Olo
- Jelicuon Lusaya
- Jelicuon Montinola
- Lag-an
- Leong
- Lutac
- Manguna
- Maraguit
- Morubuan
- Pacatin
- Pagotpot
- Pamul-ogan
- Pamuringao Proper
- Pamuringao Garrido
- Pungtod
- Puyas
- Salacay
- Sulanga
- Tabucan
- Tacdangan
- Talanghauan
- Tigbauan Road
- Tinio-an
- Tiring
- Tupol Central
- Tupol Este
- Tupol Oeste
- Tuy-an
- Zone I Pob. (Barangay 1)
- Zone II Pob. (Barangay 2)
- Zone III Pob. (Barangay 3)
- Zone IV Pob. (Barangay 4)
- Zone V Pob. (Barangay 5)
- Zone VI Pob. (Barangay 6)
- Zone VII Pob. (Barangay 7)
- Zone VIII Pob. (Barangay 8)
- Zone IX Pob. (Barangay 9)
- Zone X Pob. (Barangay 10)
- Zone XI Pob. (Barangay 11)

=== Climate ===
Climate data for Cabatuan, Iloilo
Month	Jan	Feb	Mar	Apr	May	Jun	Jul	Aug	Sep	Oct	Nov	Dec	Year
Mean daily maximum °C (°F)	29 (84)	31 (88)	32 (90)	33 (91)	31 (88)	30 (86)	29 (84)	29 (84)	29 (84)	29 (84)	29 (84)	29 (84)	30 (86)
Mean daily minimum °C (°F)	22 (72)	22 (72)	22 (72)	23 (73)	25 (77)	25 (77)	24 (75)	24 (75)	24 (75)	24 (75)	23 (73)	22 (72)	23 (74)
Average precipitation mm (inches)	48 (1.9)	41 (1.6)	58 (2.3)	82 (3.2)	223 (8.8)	300 (11.8)	346 (13.6)	307 (12.1)	311 (12.2)	292 (11.5)	167 (6.6)	81 (3.2)	2,256 (88.8)
Average rainy days	11.4	7.7	11.3	15.4	25.7	28.5	29.5	28.7	28.3	28.7	21.8	15.2	252.2
Source: Meteoblue (Use with caution: this is modeled/calculated data, not measured locally.)

== Demographics ==
Population census of Cabatuan
Year	Pop.	±% p.a.
1903	16,497	—
1918	14,816	−0.71%
1939	21,054	+1.69%
1948	24,743	+1.81%
1960	26,397	+0.54%
1970	30,078	+1.31%
1975	32,268	+1.42%
1980	34,468	+1.33%
1990	40,892	+1.72%
1995	42,264	+0.62%
2000	45,935	+1.80%
2007	50,861	+1.41%
2010	54,950	+2.85%
2015	58,442	+1.18%
2020	61,110	+0.94%
2024	62,717	+0.63%
Source: Philippine Statistics Authority

In the 2024 census, the population of Cabatuan was 62,717 people, with a density of 560 inhabitants per square kilometre or 1,500 inhabitants per square mile.

=== Languages ===
Kinaray-a and Hiligaynon are the most dominant dialects in Cabatuan. English and Tagalog are also spoken.

=== Religion ===
Roman Catholicism is the most dominant religion in this municipality.

== Economy ==
Poverty incidence of Cabatuan (%)

Source: Philippine Statistics Authority

== Government ==
=== Fire station ===
The Cabatuan Fire Station was chosen as entry of Region VI in the Search for Outstanding Municipal Fire Station in the Philippines in 2008.

=== Hymn ===
The town has its own official hymn entitled Ang Banwa nga Namat-an composed by Jesus Pablito G. Villanueva. It is required (as imposed by Municipal Ordinance No. 2007-002) that the hymn be sung after the National Anthem in flag ceremonies in all public schools, agencies, and institutions in the municipality.

=== Municipal hall ===
One of the earliest town halls built in Northern Iloilo is the Cabatuan Municipal Hall. It was built in 1734 along with the Church. Calamities and war, however, damaged the second level of this public house and many renovations had been done. On the other hand, the designs were still derived from the original plan of the Casa. The first level of the town hall is already centuries old and its interior is characterized by the Art Deco cubical columns and semi-arched Tuscan windows adorned with capiz shells.

== Infrastructure ==
The Iloilo International Airport is located in the municipality; specifically in the barangays of Tabucan, Tiring, Duyan-Duyan and Manguna. The airport can be reached either from the Cabatuan access roads (Barangay Tabucan and Barangay Tiring, Cabatuan) or from the Pavia-Santa Barbara-Cabatuan (Barangay Duyan-Duyan, Cabatuan) access road.

== Tourism ==
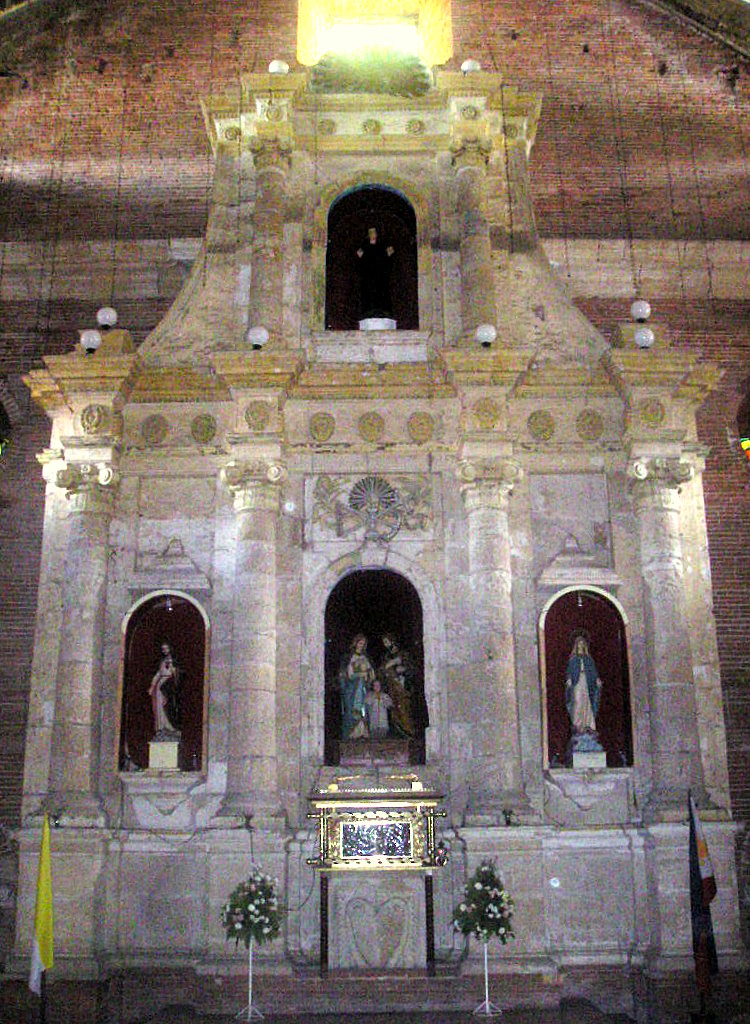
Main Altar of San Nicholas de Tolentino Parish Church

=== San Nicholas de Tolentino Church ===
Built in 1834, San Nicholas de Tolentino Parish Church is a Tuscanic church of baked brick is one of the most beautiful churches in the Philippines. The gigantic Church is the only existing church in Iloilo which has three façades. Its twin belfries capped with cream-colored domes are considered to be one of the best in the Philippines.

The church was given the title "Model of Temples" since it was the best representation of European architecture on the Philippine islands during the Spanish era. In 1948, the church was partially damaged by an earthquake which ruined four of its belfries, two of its façade pediments and the central dome. In the early 1990s the church was restored back to its present grandeur. Today, 'La Iglesia de San Nicolas de Tolentino' is one of the most picturesque churches in Asia.

=== Cabatuan Cemetery ===
This century old Spanish-Filipino Cemetery is the only cemetery in the Philippines which is in the shape of a square. There are three Byzantine arch entrances at the front-gate, and a baroque central chapel is located at the center. The chapel is a fusion of Roman, Gothic, Byzantine, and Baroque architectures. The carvings on the chapel's facade is considered to be the most distinct cemetery relief which can only be found in Cabatuan. Furthermore, this cemetery's organization is known throughout the region.

=== Pamul-ogan Hill ===
This shrine is considered to be the cradle of Cabatuan's History. At the peak of the hill lies a concrete cross reminiscent of the original cross planted by the Spaniards who first came in the region. Every lent, traditional devotees start their journey from the mouth of Barangay Pamulogan to the peak of the hill as penitence.

=== Baluarte Shrine ===
Located on Balic Hill in Cabatuan, the shrine is a religious site visited by tourists and pilgrims, particularly during the Lenten season. A cross stands at the summit, resembling the one on Pamul-ogan Hill, while an Art Deco-style chapel is situated at the base. The summit also offers panoramic views of the town.

=== The Tree of Bondage ===
The Shrine of the Bondage Tree lies in the Town plaza directly in front of the Municipal Hall of Cabatuan. It is believed that the natives were tied in this tree and whipped if they refuse the polo or forced labor during the Spanish Era. The tree is an old and artistically skewed Plumeria tree (Plumeria rubra) currently fortified with a concrete base to withstand destruction.

== Culture ==
The town celebrates three main holidays: the Cabatuan Town Fiesta on September 10, as well as the Tinuom Festival that culminates the town fiesta and the strictly observed Lenten procession during Holy Week.

=== Tinuom Festival ===
The Tinuom Festival is a celebration of the town's history and its popularly craved delicacy, tinuom made of native chicken souped with spices - tomatoes, onions, garlic, ginger, and lemon grass and wrapped in banana leaves. This festival is one of the highlights of the 10-day fiesta celebration of the municipality and is a colorful explosion of music and dances patterned from Iloilo's Kasadyahan Festival. There are six (6) competing groups (called tribes or "tribu" in the local dialect) composed of students from six secondary schools in Cabatuan. The groups are judged according to creativity, originality, costume, and choreography, among others. The winning group is the town's official representative to the Kasadyahan Festival in Iloilo City where the town has been actively participating in. This year, Tribu Ilahas from Tiring National High School, winner of the 2007 Tinuom Festival placed third in the Kasadayahan Competition.

=== Holy Week ===
Cabatuan is also known to have the most wooden and porcelain statues being showcased on Lenten processions (a religious parade evident in almost all parishes in the Philippines during Holy Week). The most popular set of these figures is the wooden Last Supper.

In the morning of Good Friday, the statue of the Nazareno together with thousands of Cabatuananons and tourists alike follow a procession locally called Via Crucis from the Church to the Balic Hill pausing on the 14 Stations of the Cross erected along the path.

In the afternoon, on the other hand, another procession is held after the Good Friday Mass around the poblacion where the said wooden and porcelain statues embellished with fresh flowers, royal cloths and personalized lighting are paraded. They pass by the Stations of the Cross creatively displayed along in life-size carvings and effigies locally called Kapiya built out of indigenous materials native to the barangays assigned to the specific station. This unique display garnered recognition in Western Visayas and consequently haul tourists as well. Pasyon Singing by barangay folks accompanying their respective Kapiya follows the procession.

The Dampug marks the culmination of Holy Week. The ceremony reenacts the angel's announcement of Christ's resurrection and his encounter with Mary. Each year, a child from a prominent local family is selected to portray the angel, known as the "Dampug". A stage, typically designed to resemble a cavern, is erected in the town plaza for the early morning presentation. The tradition continues to be observed by the local community.

== Health ==
=== Rural Health Center ===
Located at San Agustin Street right behind the plaza's covered courts, the Cabatuan Rural Health Center is the most accessible rural health center in the municipality. It caters to treatment of minor diseases and injury, vaccination, and limited laboratory testing.

=== Ramon Tabiana Memorial District Hospital ===
The Ramon Tabiana Memorial District Hospital (RTMDH) located in Barangay Pungtod, Cabatuan is the major health service institution that serves the municipality and its neighboring towns. The hospital is headed by Dr. Levi Osea, has a 50-bed capacity, and is served by 76 personnel. During the 4th Hospital Awards and Recognition Ceremony held on April 10, 2008, at the Iloilo Provincial Capitol, RTMDH was adjudged the Best District Hospital in the province of Iloilo and bagged five awards - Best Hospital, Best in Dental Service, Best in Laboratory Service, Best in Dietary Service, Best in Radiology Service and Best in Administrative Service.

== Education ==
There are two schools district offices which govern all educational institutions within the municipality. They oversee the management and operations of all private and public, from primary to secondary schools. These are the:

- Cabatuan I Schools District
- Cabatuan II Schools District

Forty-six educational institutions, including day care centers, can be found in Cabatuan. Of this total, 44 are public schools while two are private institutions, which are also accredited by the Department of Education (DepEd) and the Bureau of Secondary Education.

On the other hand, 38 public elementary schools can be found in the municipality. Twenty-nine elementary schools offer complete courses in elementary education while 9 schools only offer primary grades (Grade 1 to 4). Divided into districts, the public elementary schools in Cabatuan are almost evenly distributed among the barangays. The first district has 18 public elementary schools while the second district has 20. The 38 public elementary schools' names are enumerated below.

Two other private institutions offering complete elementary education can be found in the municipality. One is the parish-owned Cabatuan Parochial School at Rizal Ilaya Street and the other is Clairemont International Grade School at Serrano Ext. Street right beside the Cabatuan National Comprehensive High School.

=== Primary and elementary schools ===
- Alpha Omega Academy
- Apia Elementary School
- Bacan Elementary School
- Blessed Gems Christian Academe
- C. Galindo Primary School
- Cabatuan Baptist Kindergarten School
- Cabatuan Central Elementary School
- Cabatuan Parochial School
- Celda Elementary School
- Christian Life Fellowship Learning Center
- Cipriano Clama Primary School
- Clairemont International Grade School
- Colomer Elementary School
- Corazon Galindo PS
- Don Nicolas Catalan Memorial Elementary School
- Doroteo Lujan Elementary School
- Eugenio J. Hobilla Memorial Elementary School
- Gaub Elementary School
- Grio Elementary School
- Guibuangan Elementary School
- Guidance on Learning and Development Study Center
- Inaca Elementary School
- Inaladan Primary School
- Ito Elementary School
- J.B. Pueyo Primary School
- Janipaan Elementary School
- Jelicuon Elementary School
- Jiloca Elementary School
- Maraguit Elementary School
- Marin Elementary School
- Martin Cubil Elementary School
- Mateo Elementary School
- Medonn Integrated Academy
- Medonn Learning Center
- Moises Cuello Primary School
- Morobuan Primary School
- Niembra-Sotelo Primary School
- P. Muyuela Elementary School
- Pamuringao Primary School
- Parreño Elementary School
- Puga Elementary School
- Pungtod Elementary School
- Salacay Elementary School
- T. Confesor Mem. Elementary School
- Tabares Elementary School
- Tigbauan Road Elementary School
- Tiring Central Elementary School
- Tupol Elementary School
- V. Ferro Memorial Elementary School
- Venancio Deseda Memorial Primary School
- Victory-Bel Christian Elementary School
- W. Grio Elementary School

=== Secondary schools ===
The municipality has seven public secondary schools which serve the public for secondary education.

- Acao National High School
- Ambrosio Maido Memorial National High School
- Cabatuan National Comprehensive High School
- Mateo National High School
- Puga Integrated School
- Tiring National High School
- Wenceslao S. Grio National High School

== Notable personalities ==
- Tomás Confesor - Politician and former senator
- Denver Cuello - Boxer
- Nicolas Mondejar - Catholic bishop
- Hector Tarrazona - Colonel
- Felipe Landa Jocano - Anthropologist
- Flavio Zaragoza Cano - Prince of Visayan Poets
