= Cabatuan Church =

Church in Iloilo, Philippines

- San Nicolas de Tolentino Parish
- Parokya ni San Nicolas de Tolentino (Filipino); Parroquia de San Nicolás de Tolentino (Spanish)
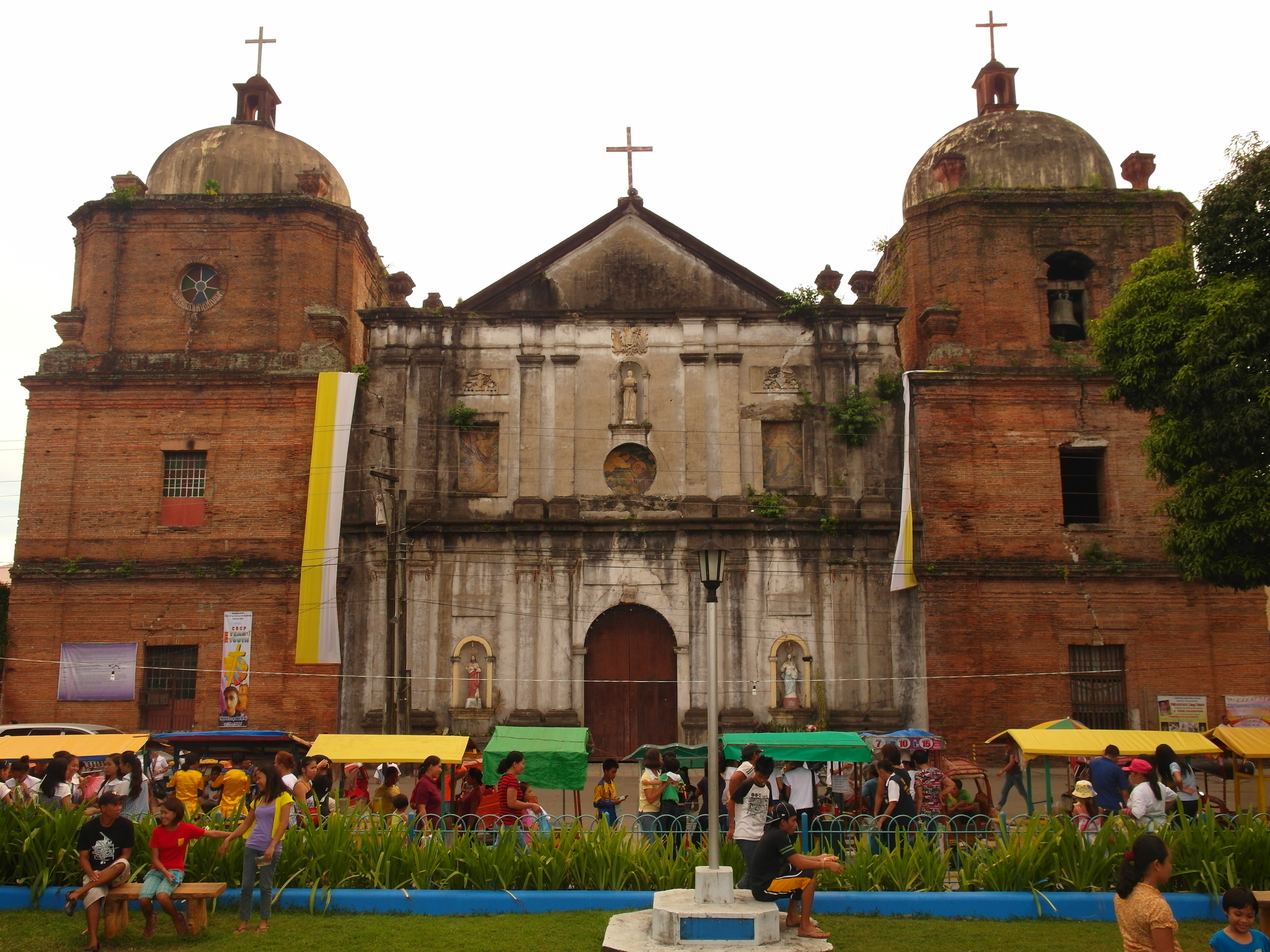
- The church's facade in 2011.

- Location in the Visayas Location in the Philippines
- 10°52′51″N 122°28′53″E
- Location: Cabatuan, Iloilo
- Country: Philippines
- Language(s): Kinaray-a, English
- Denomination: Roman Catholic

History
- Status: Parish church
- Founded: 1732; 294 years ago
- Dedication: Nicholas of Tolentino

Architecture
- Functional status: Active
- Architect: Fr. Ramon Alquizar
- Architectural type: Church building
- Style: Neoclassical
- Completed: 1866; 160 years ago

Specifications
- Length: 62.73 m (205.8 ft)
- Width: 19.25 m (63.2 ft)

Administration
- Archdiocese: Jaro
- Deanery: Saint Thomas

The San Nicolas de Tolentino Parish Church, commonly known as Cabatuan Church, is a Roman Catholic church located in the municipality of Cabatuan, Iloilo, Philippines and is under the jurisdiction of the Roman Catholic Archdiocese of Jaro. It is famously known as the "Model of Temples" by El Eco de Panay.

== History ==
Cabatuan was established as an independent parish in 1732, with Fr. Antonio Lopez serving as its first parish priest. Earlier church structures are believed to have existed prior to the construction of the present stone church.

The current church was initiated in 1834 under the supervision of the Augustinian priest Rev. Fr. Ramon Alquizar, replacing earlier temporary structures built by previous missionaries. Construction was completed in 1866. The church became known as one of the most prominent religious structures in Iloilo during the Spanish colonial period and was once described by a Spanish-language newspaper published in Iloilo in the late 19th century, El Eco de Panay as the "Model of Temples" in its September 6, 1894 issue. It was also regarded as the largest brick structure in Western Visayas during its time.

Before the Second World War, a large convento or rectory stood beside the church. The structure was burned by guerilla forces in 1942 as part of a scorched-earth strategy and was later demolished by the Imperial Japanese Army in 1943. Its bricks were reportedly reused in the construction of the Tiring Landing Field.

On January 25, 1948, an earthquake struck Panay Island and caused significant damage to the church, including the destruction of four of its six belfries.

== Architecture ==
The San Nicolas de Tolentino Parish Church is primarily designed in the Neoclassical style with Tuscan and Renaissance architectural elements. Constructed mainly of red brick, the church is noted for its massive appearance, thick walls, and cruciform layout measuring approximately 60 meters in length and 20 meters in width.

The church is considered architecturally unique in Iloilo for having three facades and originally six belfries, although only two remain after the 1948 earthquake. The main facade features Tuscan pilasters, horizontal cornices, and Augustinian symbols, including the pope's tiara and the emblem of the transfixed heart. Niches containing religious figures flank the main entrance, while the upper level contains the image niche of the patron saint.

The remaining two bell towers are described as having Moorish or Byzantine influences and are crowned with domes, cupolas, and crosses. The nave walls contain archways and clerestory rose windows with multicolored glass panes, while the interior includes wooden pulpits with gilded bases near the transepts.

== Gallery ==
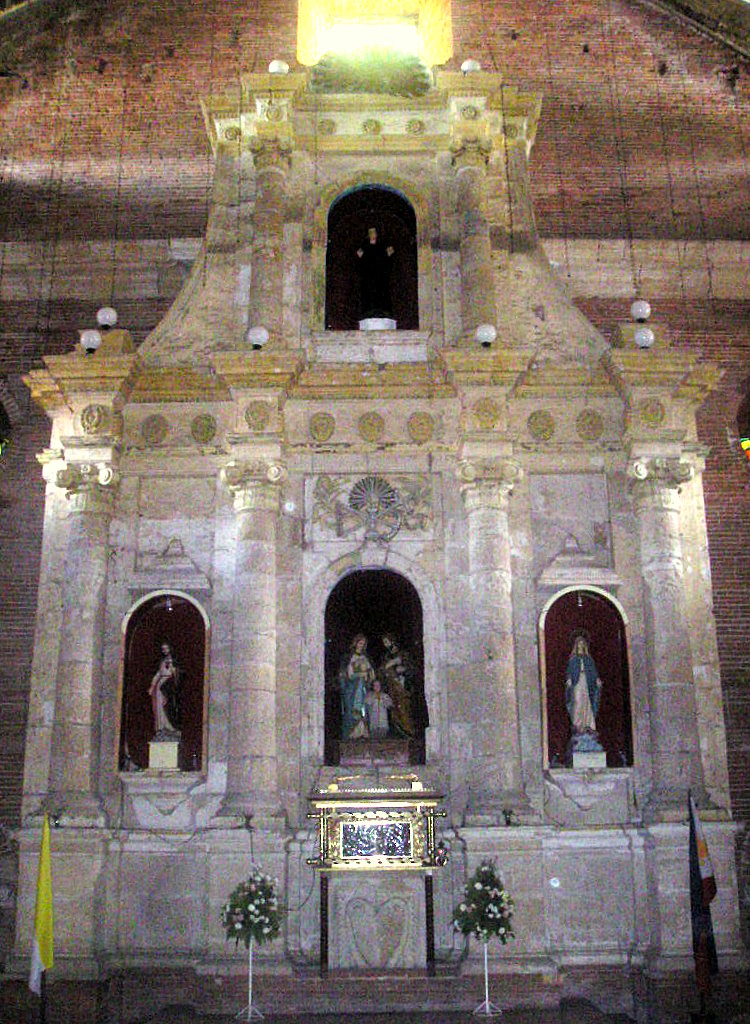
The main altar of the church.

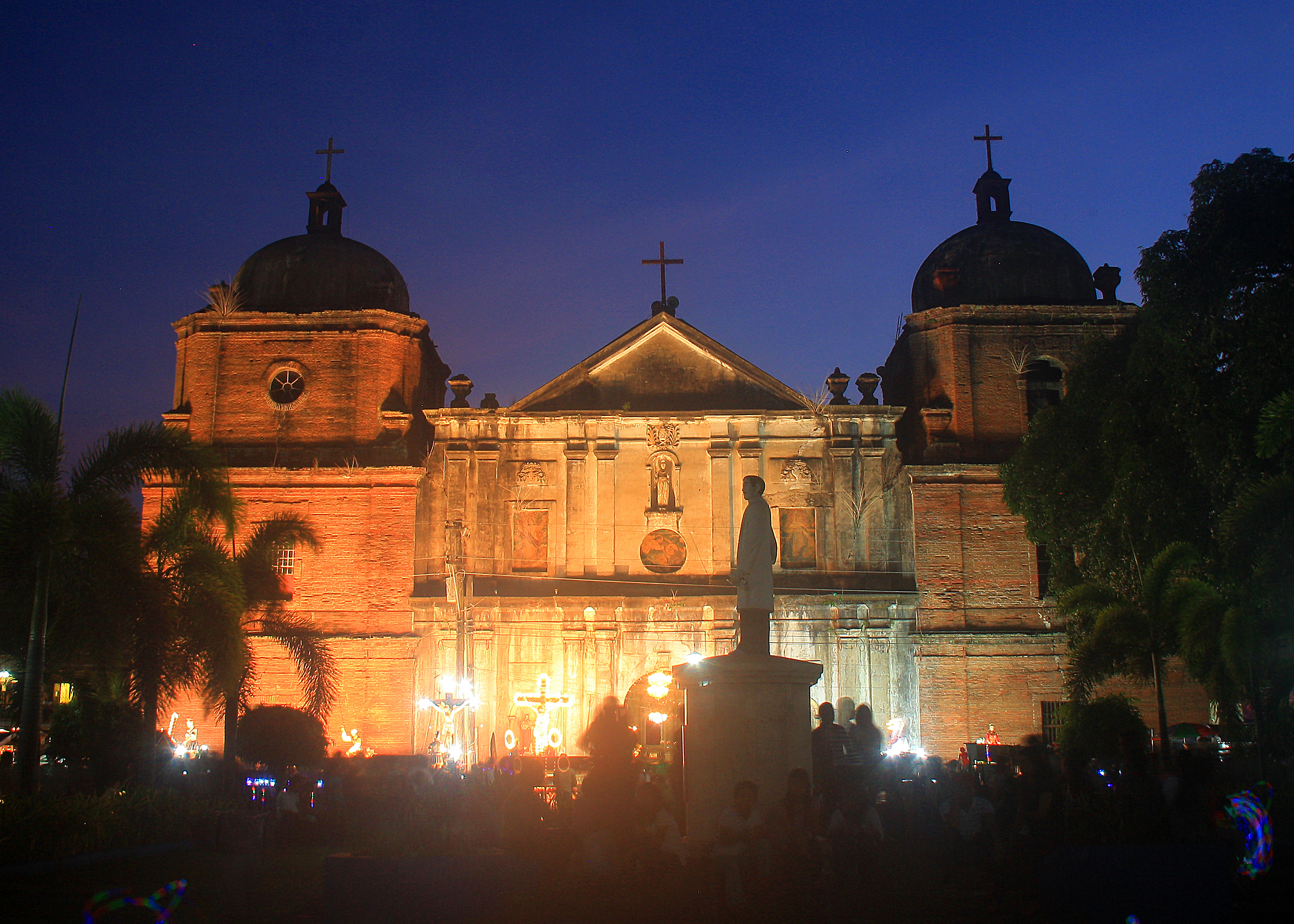
The church by night.
