= List of Art Deco architecture in Asia =

This is a list of buildings that are examples of Art Deco in Asia:

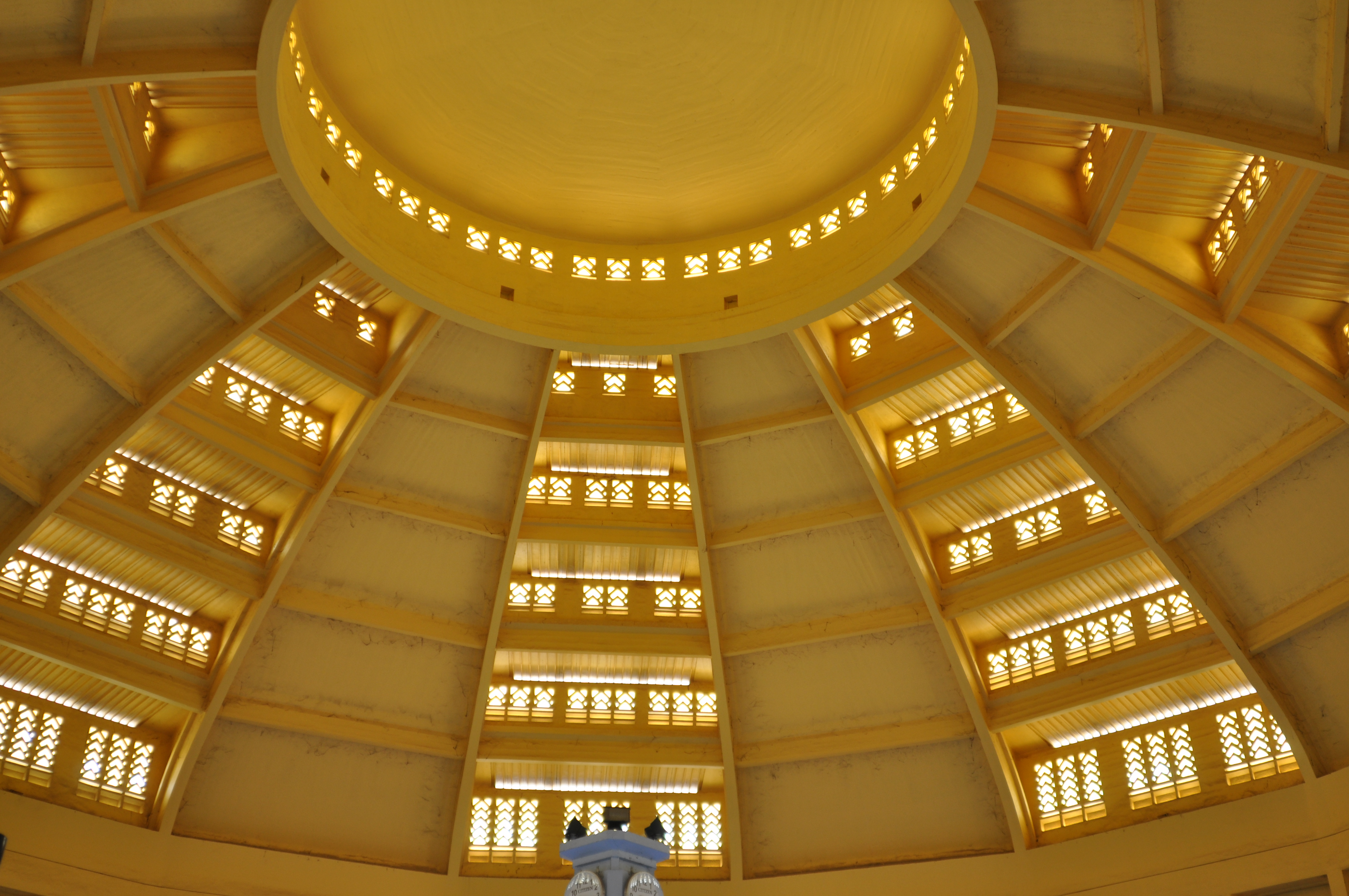
Phnom Penh Central Market, Phnom Penh, Cambodia

== Cambodia ==
- Central Market (Phsar Thom Thmei), Phnom Penh, Phnom Penh, 1937
- Central Market, Battambang
- Phnom Penh railway station, Phnom Penh, 1932

== China ==
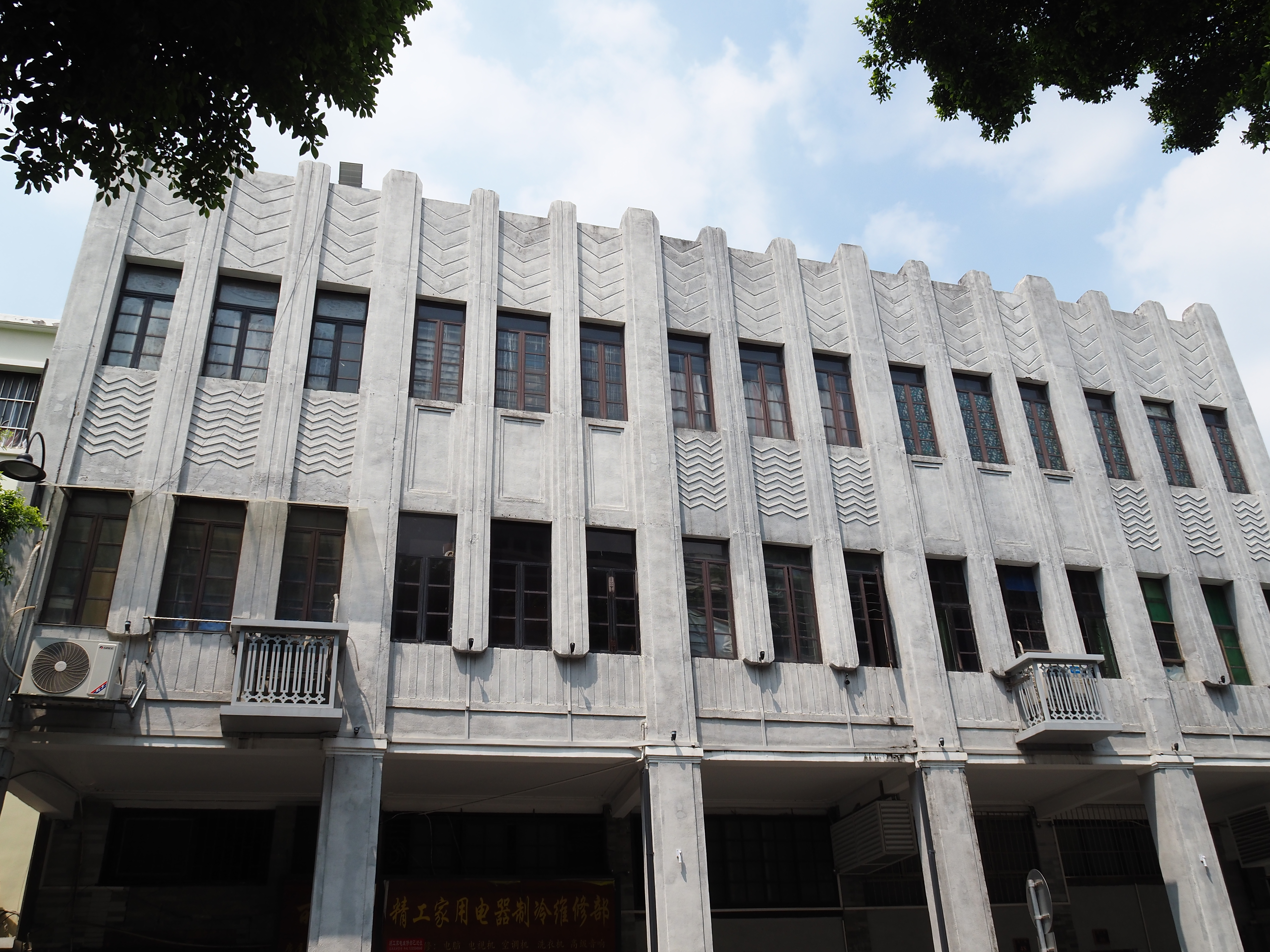
Tong Lau on Enning Road No. 46-54, Guangzhou

=== Guangzhou ===
source: 广州市各级文物保护单位列表, 广州市历史建筑列表

- Baoyuan Zhongyue No. 25(宝源中约25号民居), Guangzhou
- Dai Tung Restaurant, Guangzhou, construction halted in 1938 due to Japanese invasion, topped out in 1958
- Donggao Yiheng Road No. 3 (东皋一横路3号民居), Guangzhou
- Eng Aun Tong (Guangzhou), Guangzhou, 1937
- Enning Road No. 46-54 (恩宁路46~54号骑楼), Guangzhou
- Fok Zi Ting Mansion (霍芝庭公馆旧址), Guangzhou
- Haizhu Nan Road No. 152 (海珠南路152号骑楼), Guangzhou
- Jianglan Road No. 102 (桨栏路102号), Guangzhou
- Ng Lou (梧庐), Guangzhou
- Oi Kwan Hotel, Guangzhou, 1937
- Renmin Road No. 33 (人民南路33号骑楼), Guangzhou

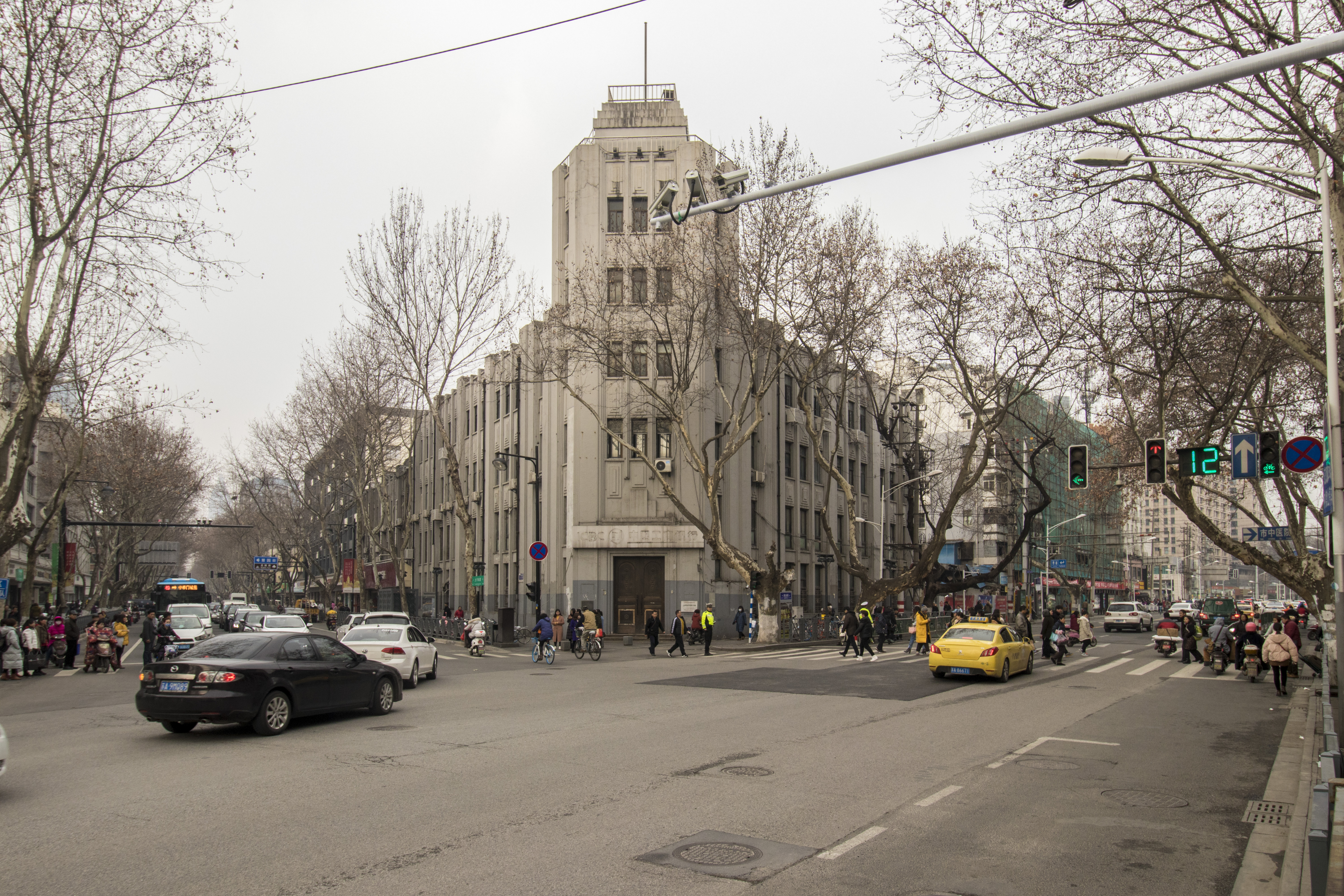
Former Shanghai Commercial and Savings Bank, Nanjing

=== Nanjing ===
source: 南京市境内的江苏省文物保护单位列表

- China & South Sea Bank Building (Nanjing), Nanjing, 1929
- Fuchang Hotel, Nanjing, 1933
- Nanjing Dahua Theatre, Nanjing, 1935
- National Commercial Bank Building (Nanjing), Nanjing, 1937
- Shanghai Commercial and Savings Bank Building (Nanjing), Nanjing, 1933
- Presidential Building (子超楼), Presidential Palace (Nanjing), Nanjing, 1936

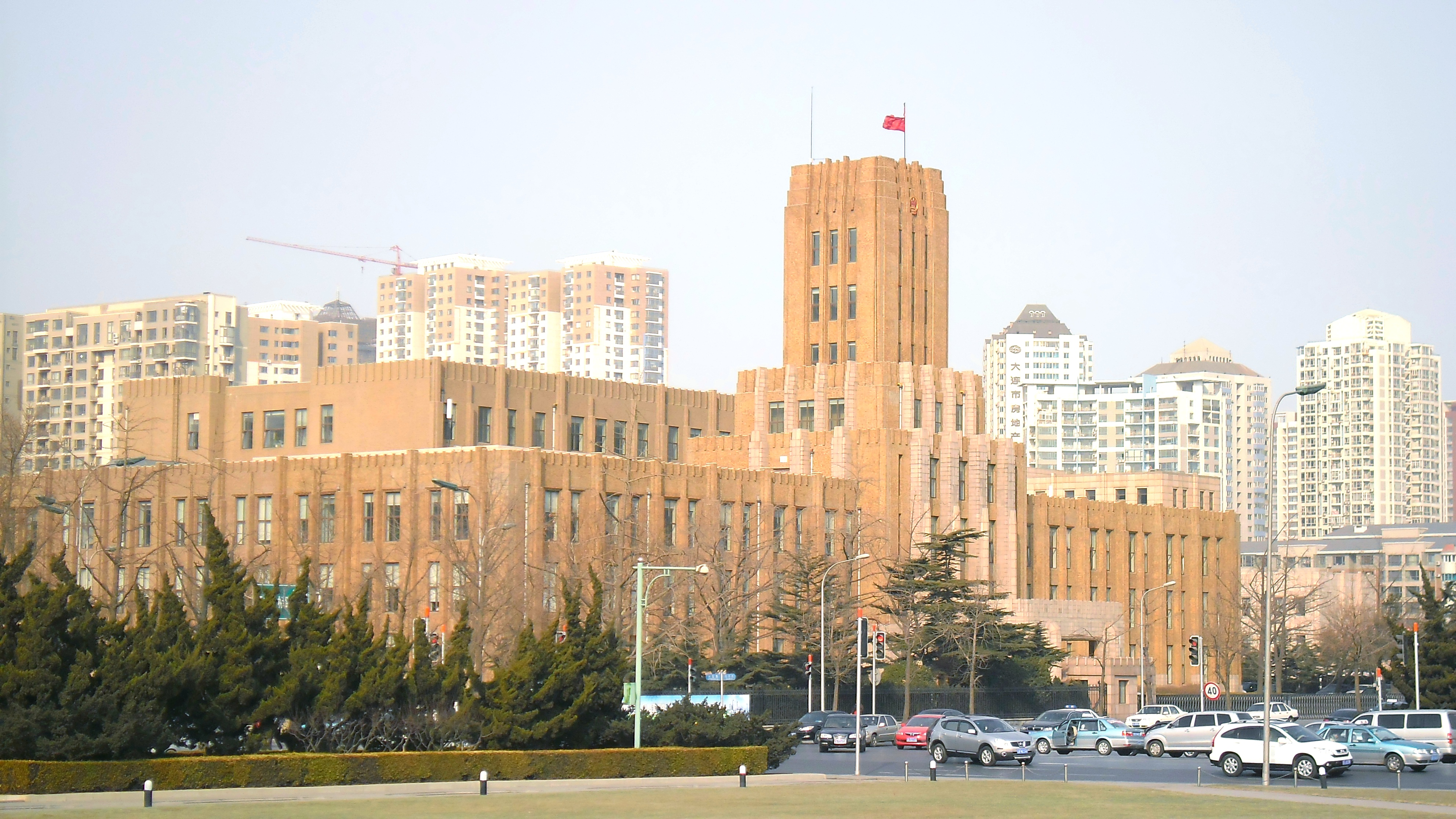
Dalian Intermediate people's court (Former Kwantung Regional Court Building)

=== Northeastern Provinces ===
- Baoshan Department Store, Changchun, 1938
- Dalian Intermediate people's court, Former Kwantung Regional Court Building (大连市中级人民法院,原关东厅地方法院旧址）), Dalian, 1930
- Dalian Public Security Bureau, Former Kwantung Police Bureau Building (大连市公安局,原关东厅警察署), Dalian, 1930
- Fengle Theatre, Changchun, 1935
- Former Dalian Broadcasting Center (大连中央放送局旧址), Dalian 1925
- Former Daxing Company Building, Changchun, 1936
- Former Mukden Yuelai Hotel Building, Shenyang, 1921
- Harbin International Hotel (哈尔滨国际饭店), Harbin, 1937

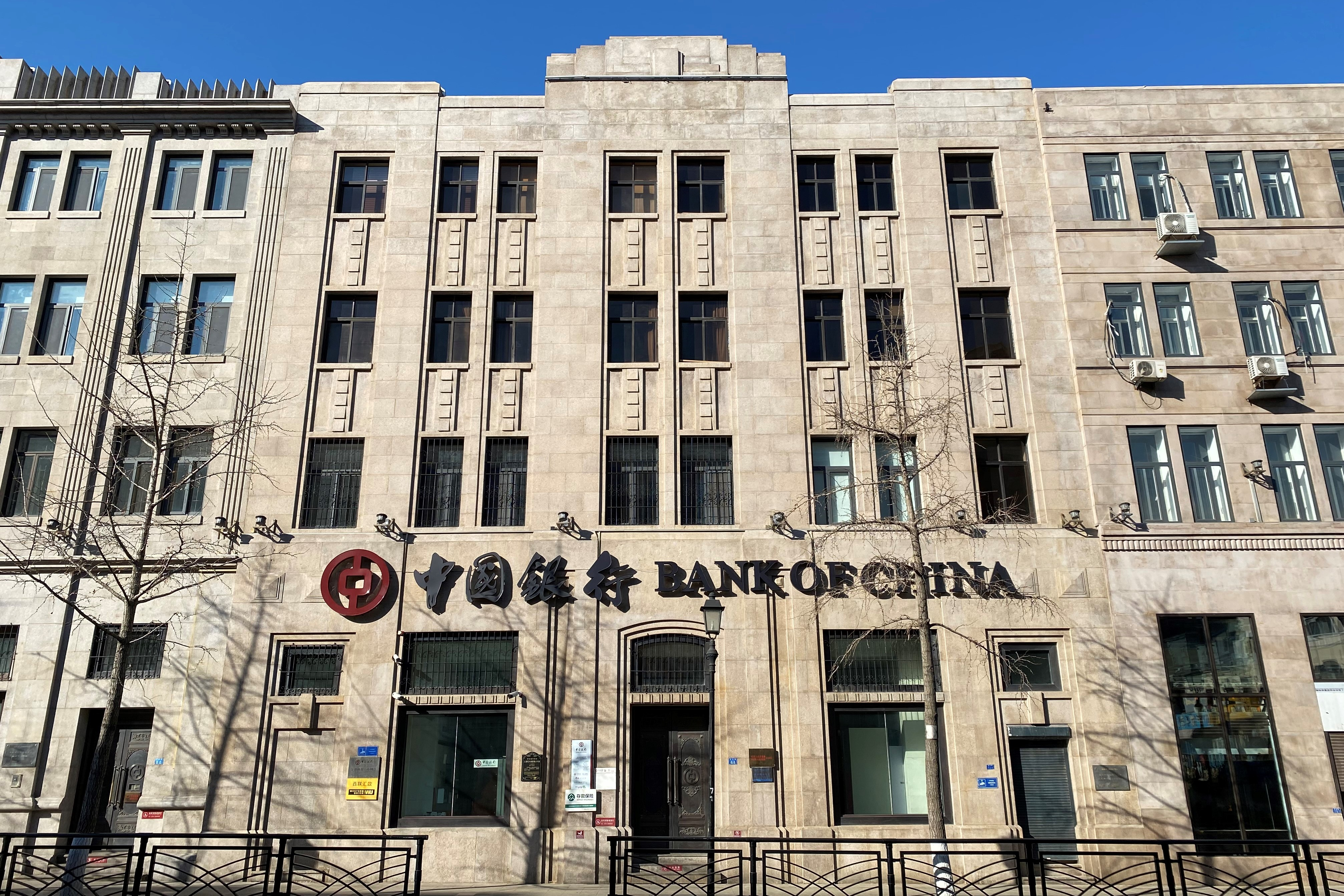
Shanghai Commercial and Savings Bank, Qingdao

=== Qingdao ===
source: 青岛中山路近代建筑

- Continental Bank Building (Qingdao), Qingdao, 1934
- Former Shandong Theatre, Qingdao, 1931
- Hong Tai Department Store, Qingdao, 1932
- Ming Hua Building, Qingdao, 1934
- Qingdao Commodity Stock Exchange, Qingdao, 1933
- Shanghai Commercial and Savings Bank (Qingdao), Qingdao, 1934
- Shanzuo Bank Building, Qingdao, 1934
- Xin Xin Apartment Building, Qingdao, 1936
- Yong An Theatre, Qingdao, 1924

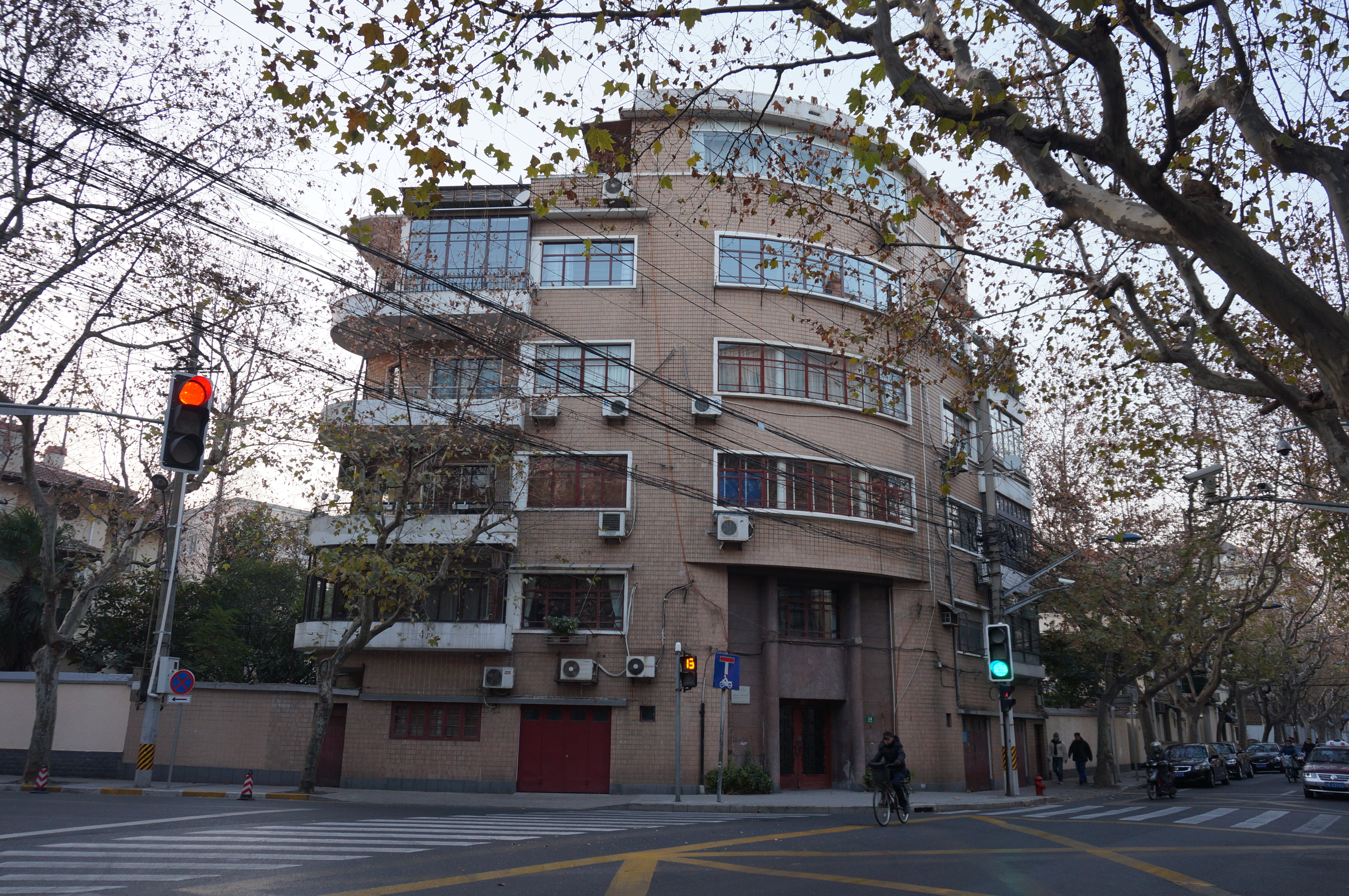
Amyron Apartments, Shanghai, China

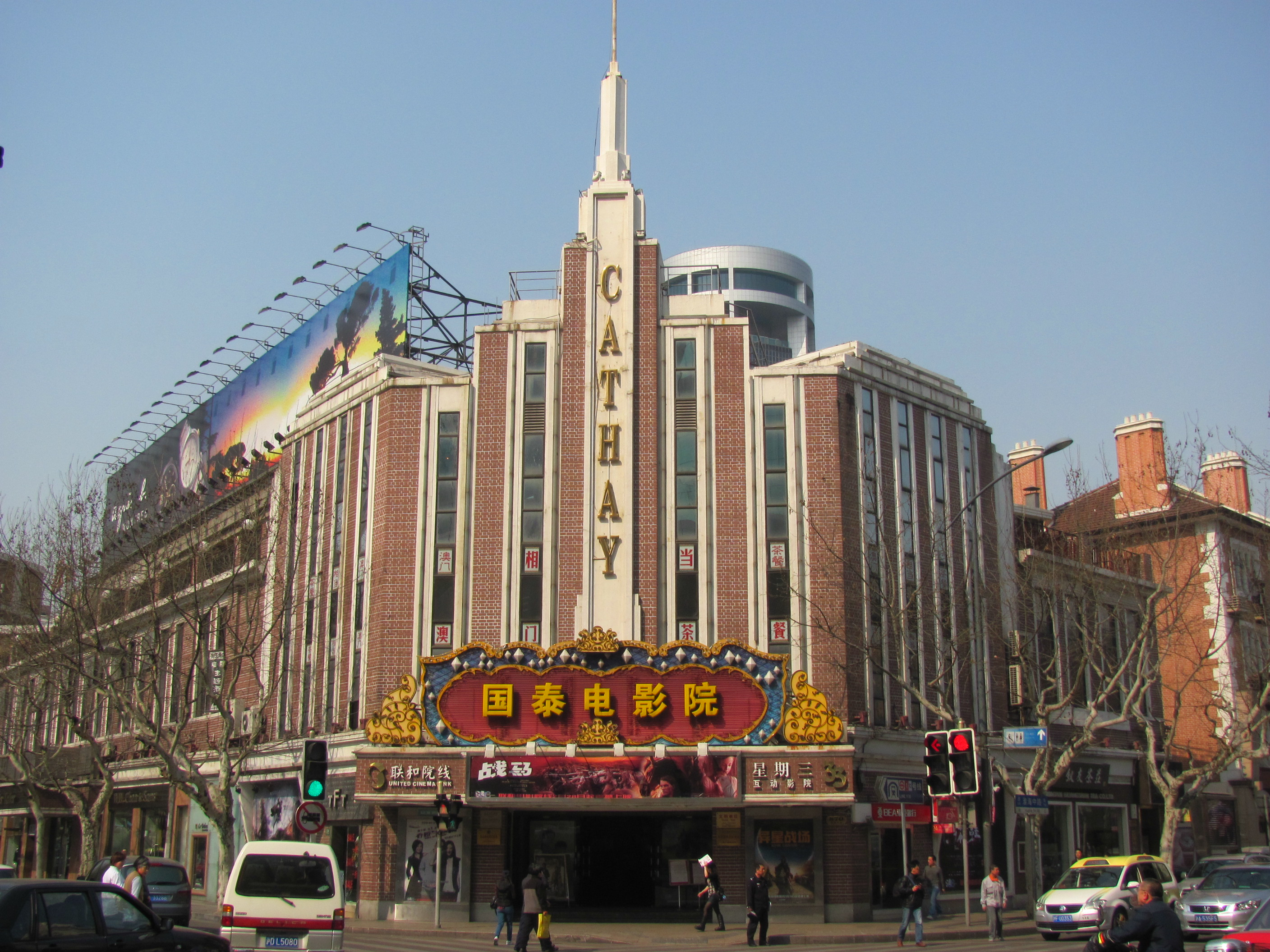
Cathay Theater, Shanghai, China

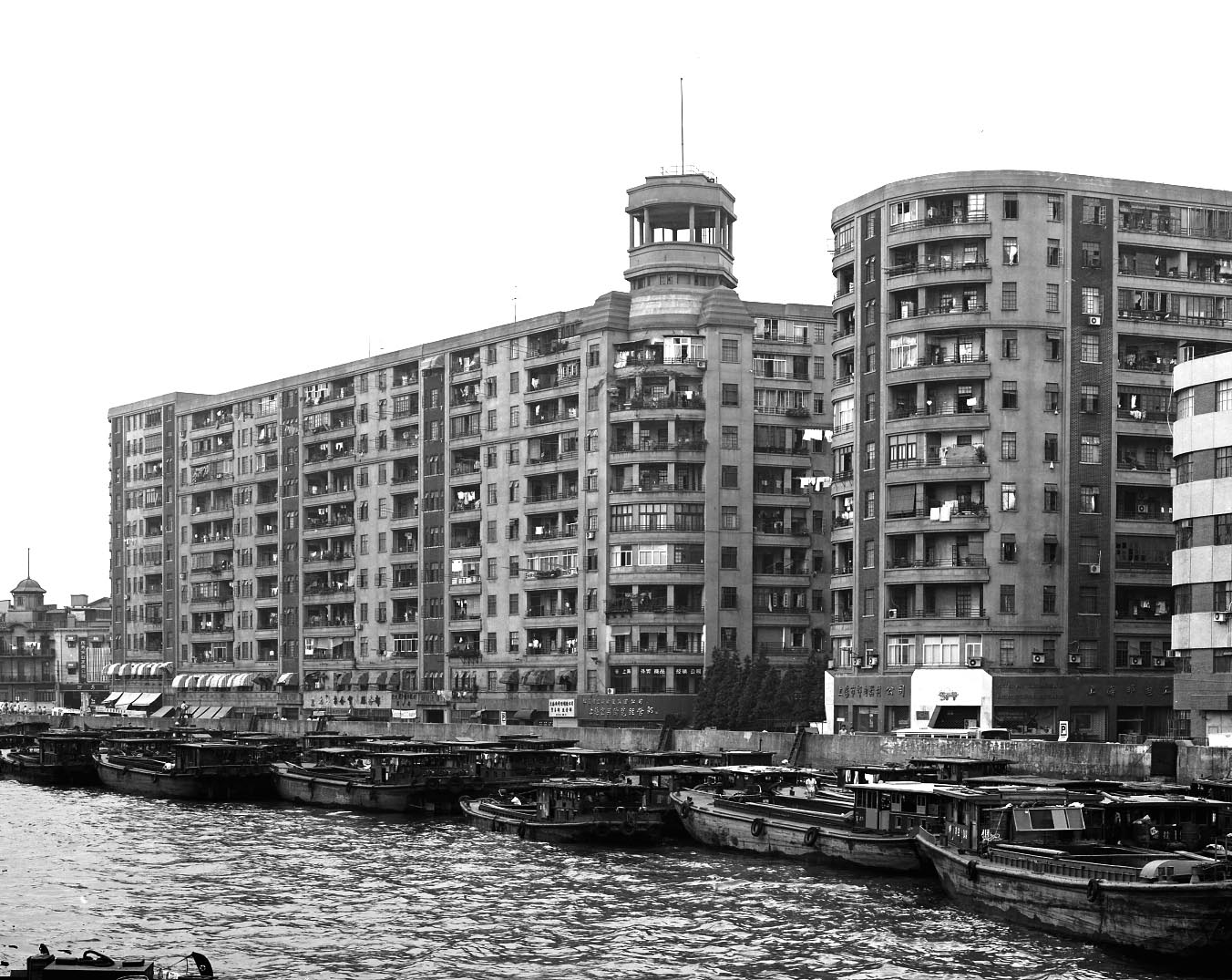
The Embankment House

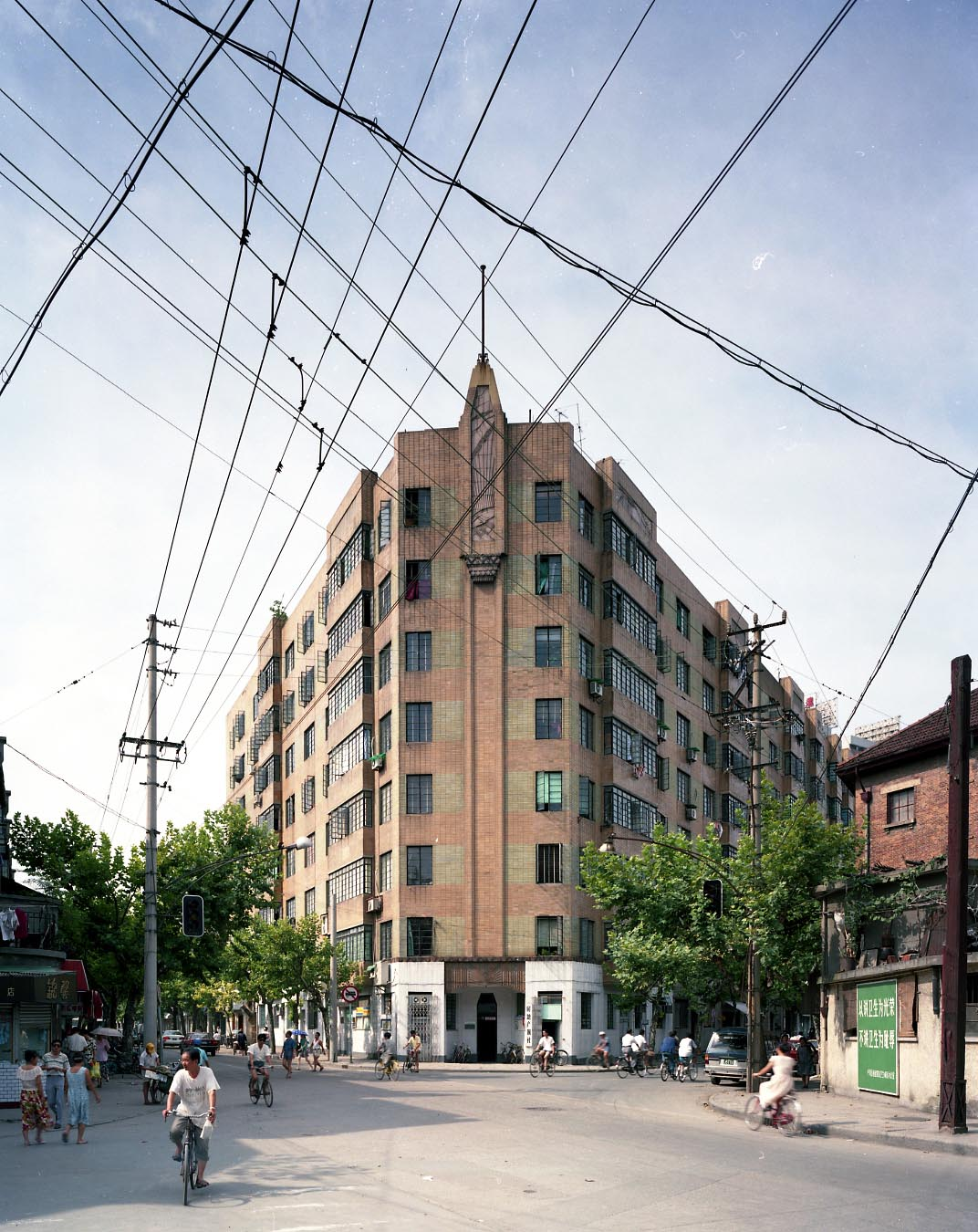
The Astrid Apartments

=== Shanghai ===
- Amyron Apartments, Shanghai, 1941
- Avenue Apartments, Shanghai, 1932
- Bank of China Building, Shanghai, Shanghai, 1937
- Bank of Shanghai/Shangha Federation of Trade Unions (formerly the China Bank of Communications), Shanghai, 1949
- Bank of Taiwan Building, Shanghai, 1924
- Broadway Mansions, Shanghai, 1935
- Cathay Theatre, Shanghai, 1932
- Cercle Sportif Français, Shanghai, 1926
- Changde Apartments/Eddington House, Shanghai, 1936
- Chinese YMCA, Shanghai, 1934
- Defense of Sihang Warehouse, Shanghai, 1931
- Denis Apartments, Shanghai, 1928
- Dubail Apartments, Shanghai, 1931
- Dufour Apartments, Shanghai, 1939
- Embankment Building, Shanghai, 1932
- Empire Mansions, Shanghai, 1931
- Engineering Building at the Xuhui campus – Jiao Tong University, Shanghai, 1932
- Eye and ENT Hospital of Fudan University, Shanghai, 1934
- Fuyou Road Mosque, Shanghai, 1936
- Gascogne Apartments, Shanghai, 1935
- German Church, Shanghai, 1932
- Grand Cinema, Shanghai, 1933
- Green House/Woo Villa (Laszlo Hudec, now the Urban Design and Planning Institute), Shanghai, 1938
- Hamilton House, Shanghai, 1931
- Hengshan Picardie Hotel, Shanghai, 1934
- Huaihai Lu, Avenue Joffre, Shanghai
- Institut Pasteur of Shanghai (formerly Musee Heude), Shanghai, 1930
- Jiangwan Sports Center (stadium, natatorium), Shanghai, 1934
- Jinjiang Hotel (former Cathay Mansion, 1929 and Grosvenor House, 1934), Shanghai
- Magy Apartments, Shanghai, 1936
- Majestic Theatre, Shanghai, 1941
- Medhurst Apartments, Shanghai, 1934
- New Asia Hotel, Hongkou, Shanghai, 1934
- Paramount (Shanghai), Shanghai, 1933
- Park Hotel, Shanghai, 1934)
- Peace Hotel (Part of The Bund, Palmer & Turner), Shanghai, 1929
- Pei Mansion, Shanghai, 1934
- Rainbow Apartments, Shanghai
- Renji Hospital (formerly Lester Chinese Hospital), Shanghai, 1932
- Rockbund Art Museum, Shanghai, China, 1933
- Stellar International Cineplex, Shanghai, 1932
- Villas Hotel, Shanghai, 1930s
- Washington Apartments, Shanghai, 1928
- Wheelock and Co. Sichuan Mansion, Shanghai, 1943
- Wukang Mansion/Normandie Apartments, Shanghai, 1924

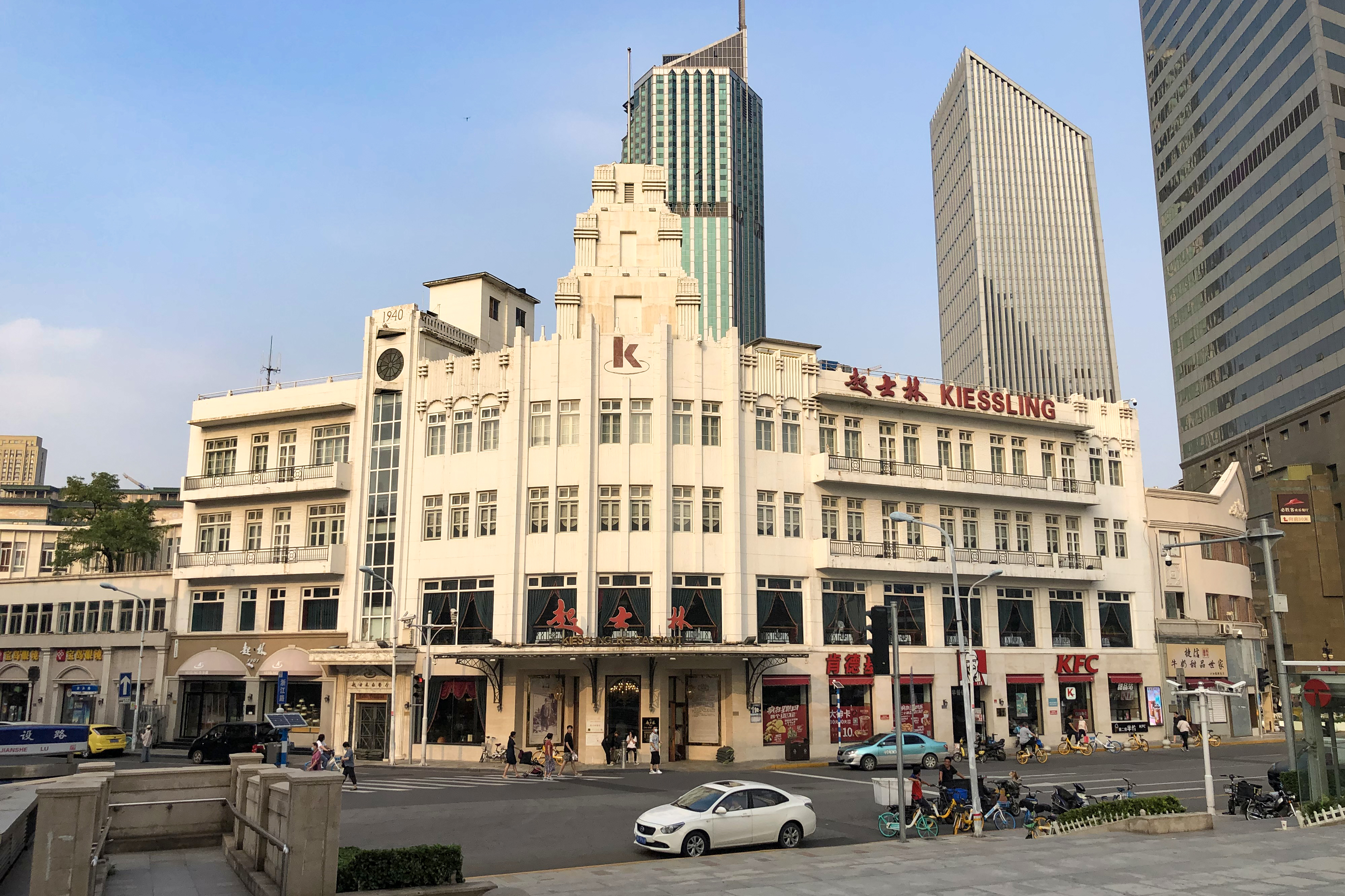
Kiessling Restaurant, Tianjin

=== Tianjin ===
source:, 天津市文物保护单位, 天津市历史风貌建筑列表

- Bohai Building, Tianjin, 1934
- Former Residence of Sun Jilu, Tianjin, 1939
- Former Residence of Xu Shuqiang, Tianjin, 1940
- Jai alai Sportcenter, Tianjin, 1933
- Leopold Building, Tianjin, 1938
- Mao Gen Building, Tianjin, 1937
- Tianjin Department Store, Tianjin, 1926
- Tianjin Synagogue, Tianjin, 1940
- Xin Hua Trust and Savings Bank Building, Tianjin, 1934
- Victoria Building/Kiessling Restaurant, Tianjin, 1940

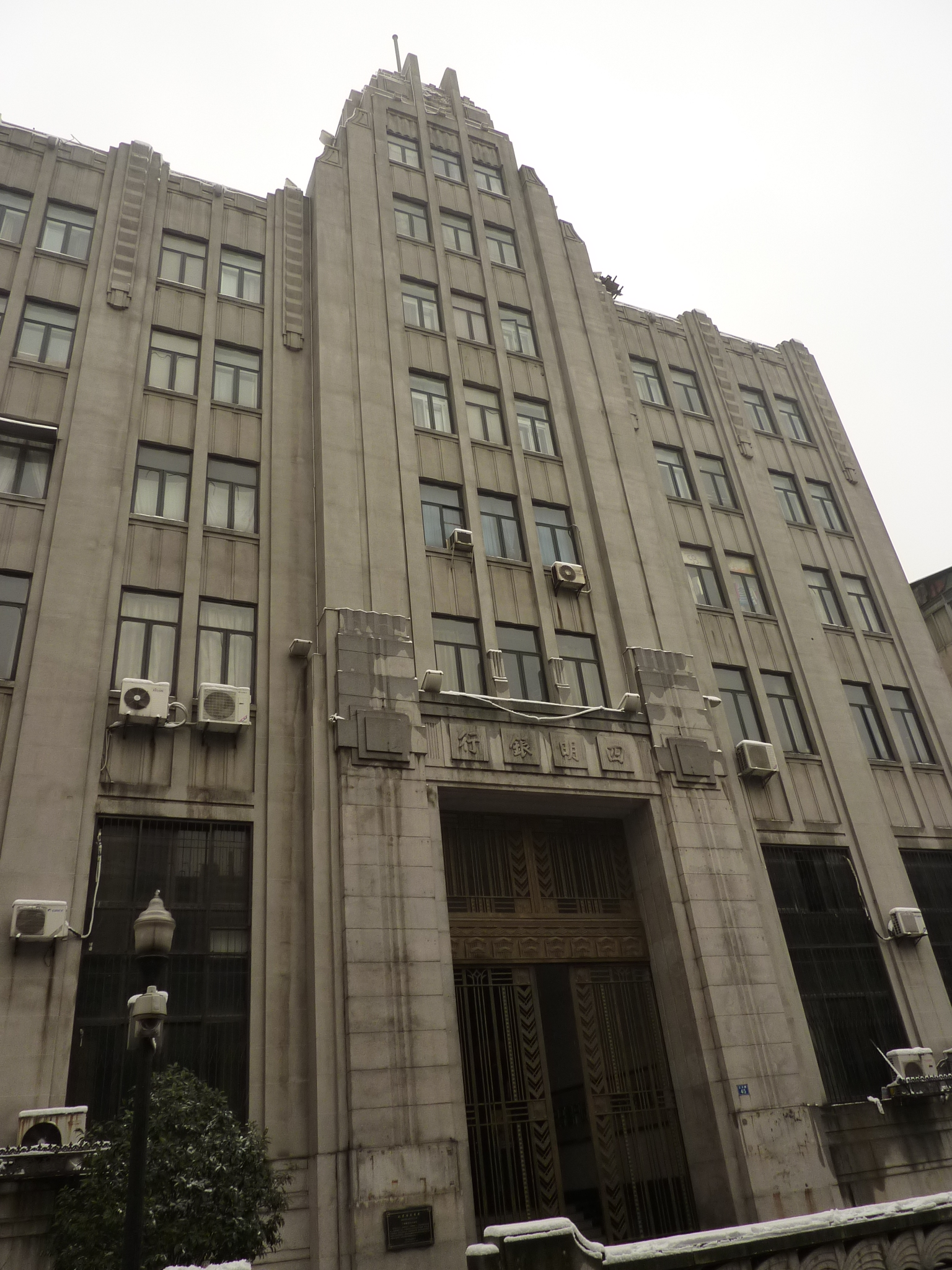
Si Ming Bank Building, Wuhan

=== Wuhan ===
source: 武汉市优秀历史建筑列表

- Central Trust of China Building (中央信托局汉口分局), Wuhan, 1936
- Da Fu Bank Building (大孚银行), Wuhan, 1936
- Juxingcheng Bank Building (聚兴诚银行), Wuhan, 1935
- National Industrial Bank of China Building (中国实业银行), Wuhan, 1936
- Si Ming Bank Building (四明银行), Wuhan, 1936

=== Other cities ===
- Imperial Bank of China Building (Ningbo), Ningbo, 1930
- Former East Asia Development Board Liaison Office (兴亚院厦门联络部旧址), occupied on the former Huang Zhencheng residence, Xiamen, 1930

== Hong Kong ==
- Bank of China Building, Hong Kong, 1951
- The Peninsula Hong Kong, Hong Kong, 1928
- Yau Ma Tei Theatre, Hong Kong, 1930

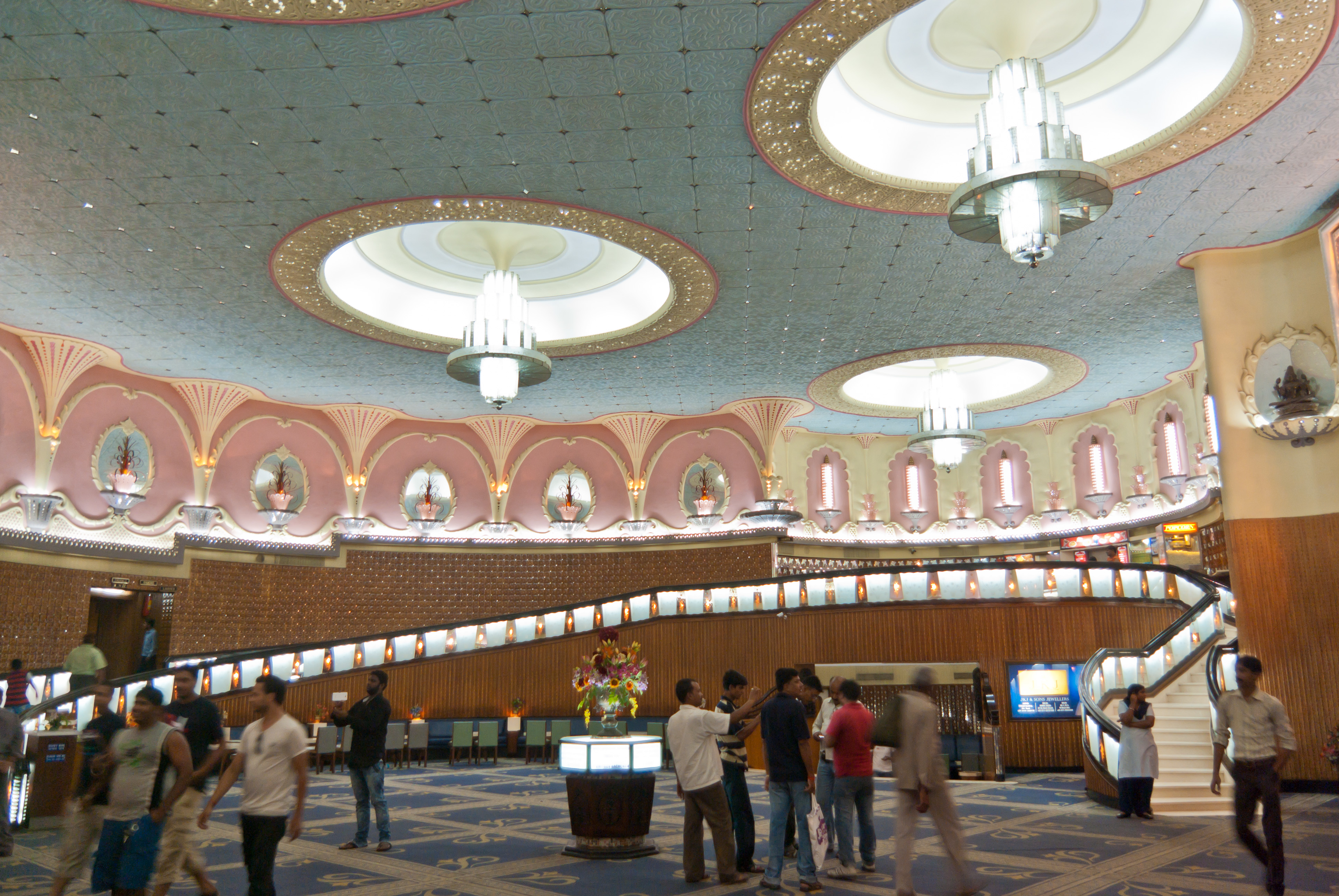
Raj Mandir Cinema, Jaipur, India

== India ==
- Ahmedabad Town Hall
- Electricity House - Vijali Ghar, Ahmedabad, Gujarat
- The Imperial Hotel, New Delhi, 1931
- Magen Avraham Synagogue, Ahmedabad, Gujarat, 1934
- Prabhat Talkies, Mangalore,
- Rajeshwari Theatre - Konankunte, Kon, Bangalore, Karnataka
- Umaid Bhawan Palace indoor pool, Jaipur, 1928–1943

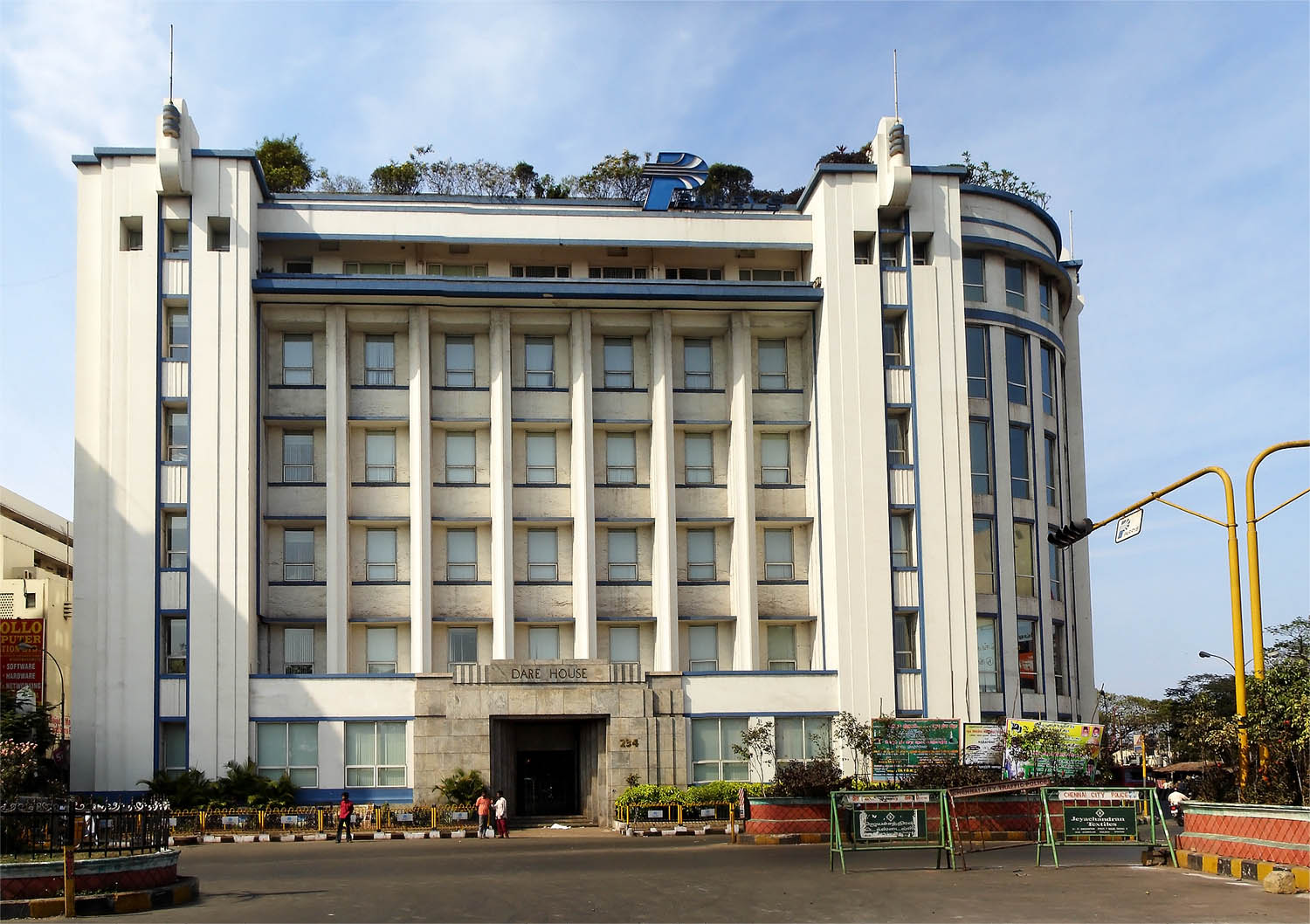
Dare House, Chennai, India

=== Chennai ===
- Andhra Insurance Buildings, Chennai, 1940
- Casino Theatre, Chennai, 1941
- Catholic Centre, Chennai, 1951
- Dare House (EID Parry Building), Chennai, 1940
- Kamadhenu Theatre, Chennai, 1945
- Kasturi Buildings (The Hindu), Chennai, 1939
- Oriental Buildings, Chennai, 1935
- Taj Connemara, Chennai, 1854, 1937

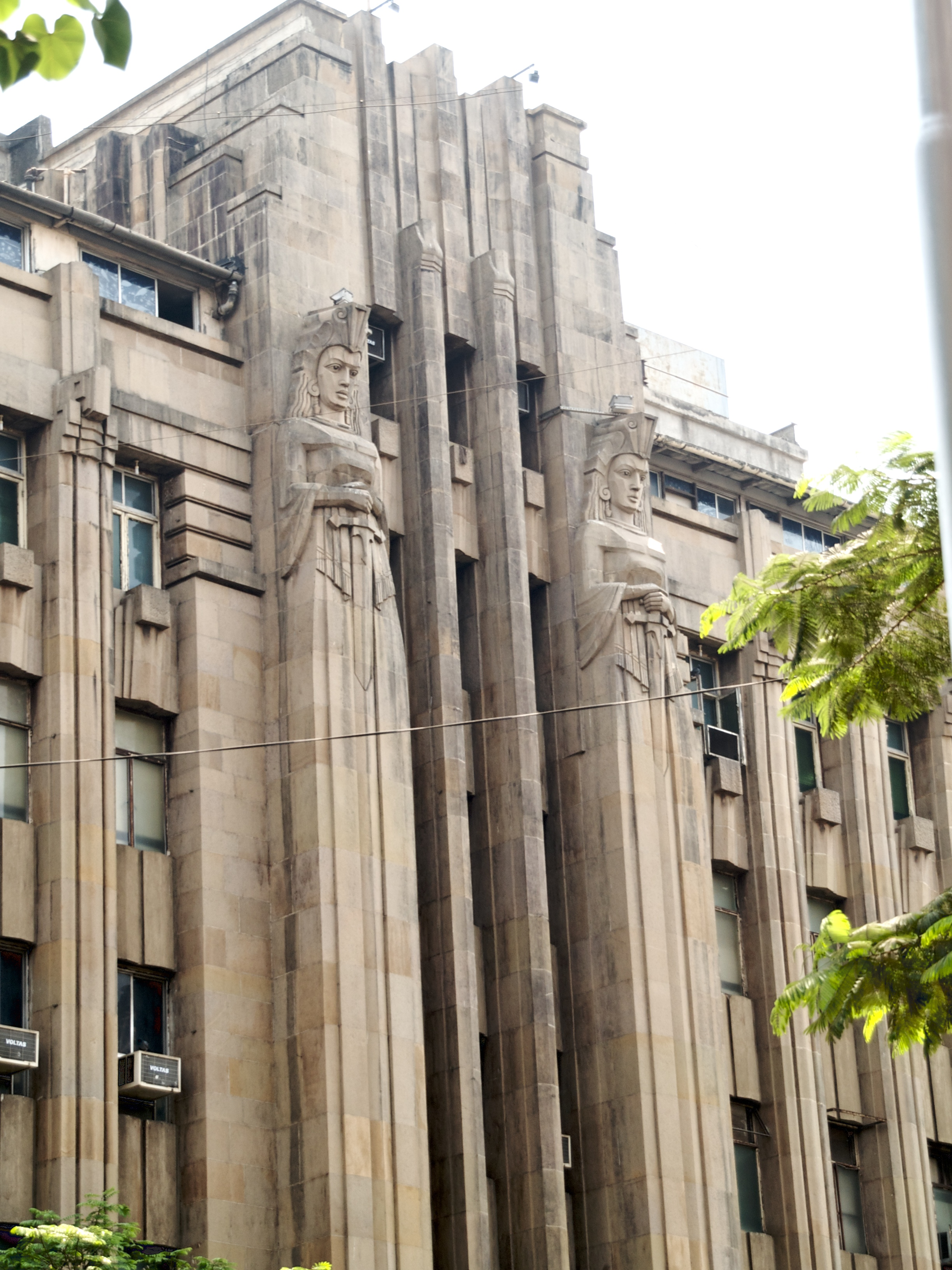
New India Assurance Building, Mumbai, India

=== Mumbai ===
- Eros Cinema, Mumbai, 1935
- Government Law College, Mumbai, 1938
- Indian Merchant's Chamber building, Mumbai, 1939
- Kapadia Chambers apartments, Mumbai
- Metro Cinema, Mumbai, 1938
- N.M. Petit Fasli Agiary, Mumbai, 1939
- New Empire Cinema, Mumbai, 1908, 1948
- New India Assurance Building, Mumbai, 1936
- Regal Cinema, Mumbai, 1933
- Shri Ganesh Krupa, Shivaji Park, Mumbai
- Taraporewala Aquarium, Mumbai, 1951
- United Building, Mumbai

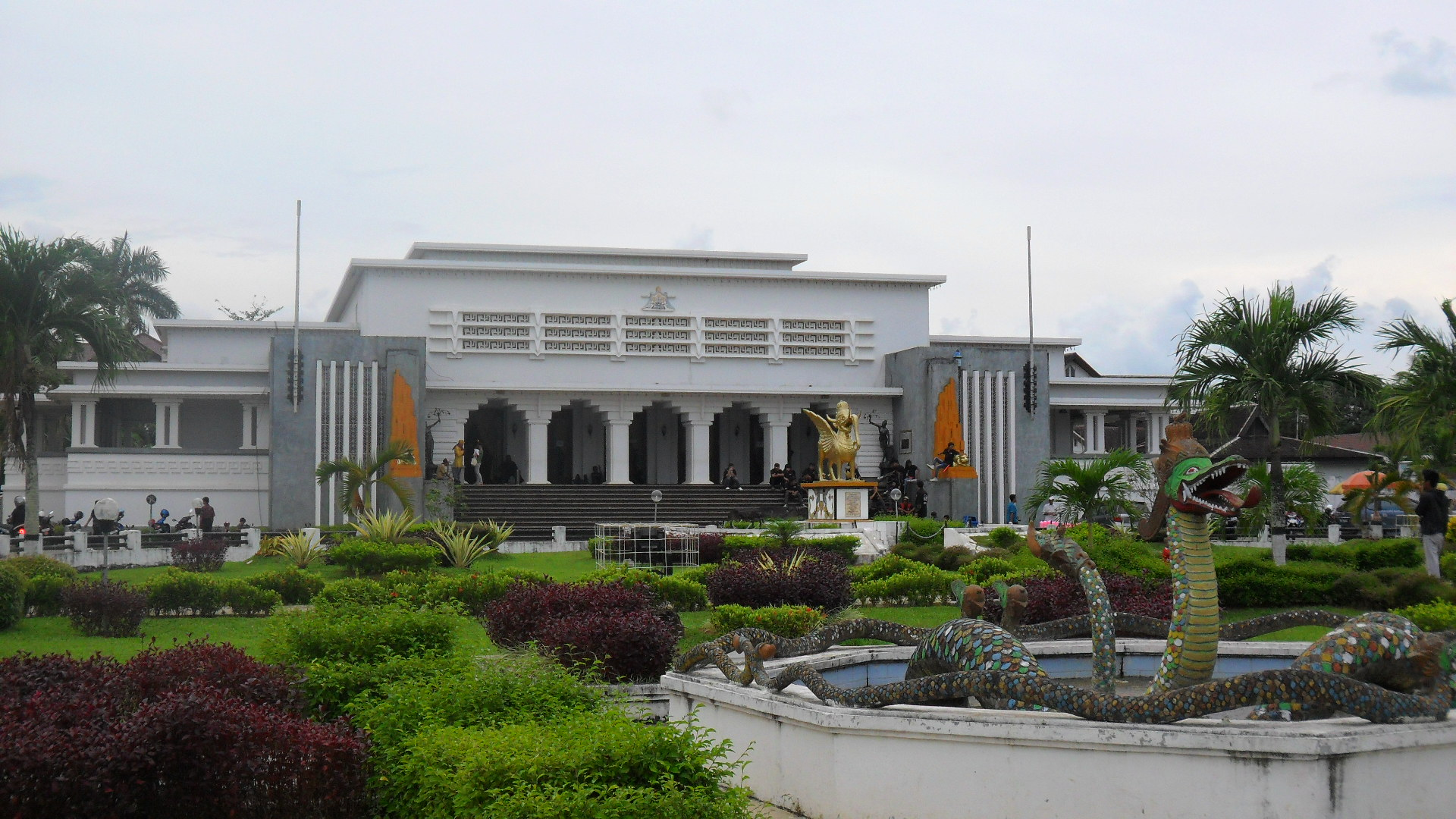
Mulawarman Museum, Tenggarong, East Kalimantan, Indonesia

== Indonesia ==
- Art council building (formerly Societeit De Harmonie), Makassar, South Sulawesi, 1910
- Asy-Syuro Cipari Mosque, Garut, West Java, 1936
- Balai Pertemuan, Palembang, South Sumatra, 1920s
- Banjarbaru City Hall, Banjarbaru, South Kalimantan, 1924
- Banjarmasin Cathedral, Banjarmasin, South Kalimantan, 1931
- Birao Building, Tegal, Central Java, 1913
- Bioskop Garuda, Kediri, East Java, 1970s
- Bioskop Irama, Pameksaan, Madura Island, 1952
- Bioskop Juliana, Garut, West Java, 1918
- Bioskop Karia, Padang Panjang, West Sumatra, 1931
- Bioskop Permata, Special Region of Yogyakarta, 1940s
- Bioskop Puspa, Lhokseumawe, Aceh, 1963
- Bioskop Ria, Pematangsiantar, North Sumatra, 1955
- Cirebon City Hall, Cirebon, West Java, 1927
- Cirebon railway station, Cirebon, West Java, 1912
- Gedung BAT (Formerly British American Tobacco regional headquarters), Cirebon, West Java, 1924
- Gedung Bundar, Magelang, Central Java, 1934
- Gedung Juang Tambun, Bekasi, West Java, 1925
- GKJ Gondokusuman, Yogyakarta special region, 1913
- GPIB Maranatha, Pangkalpinang, Bangka Belitung Islands, 1927
- Graha Tumapel, Malang, East Java, 1928
- Ijen Cathedral, Malang, East Java, 1934
- Inna Bali Hotel, Denpasar, Bali, 1927
- Kolese Santo Yusup (formerly The Neutrale Lagere School), Malang, East Java, 1930s
- Madiun City Hall, Madiun, East Java, 1930
- Mako Lanal, Tegal, Central Java, 1914
- Malang City Hall, Malang, East Java, 1929
- Mulawarman Museum, Tenggarong, East Kalimantan, 1936
- Official Residence of the Governor of South Sulawesi, Makassar, South Sulawesi, 1935
- Old Padang City hall, Padang, West Sumatra, 1936
- Palembang Mayoral Office, Palembang, South Sumatra, 1931
- Pekalongan Post office, Pekalongan, Central Java, 1920
- Regional Chief Economist (RCE) Center, Malang, East Java, 1936
- Rio X'nter (formerly Bioscoop Rio), Cimahi, West Java, 1947
- Sacred Heart of Jesus church, Banda Aceh, Aceh, 1926
- Siantar railway station, Pematangsiantar, North Sumatra, 1916
- SMAN 1 Building, Surakarta, Central Java, 1943
- Stella Maris Hospital, Makassar, South Sulawesi, 1937
- St. Anthony's church Kotabaru, Yogyakarta Special region, 1926
- St. Joseph's church, Ambarawa, Central Java, 1924
- Tegal Post Office, Tegal, Central Java, 1930
- Waterleiding Tower, Tegal, Central Java, 1932
- Yogyakarta railway station, Yogyakarta Special region, 1920 (current facade)
- Zebaoth Church, Bogor, West Java, 1920

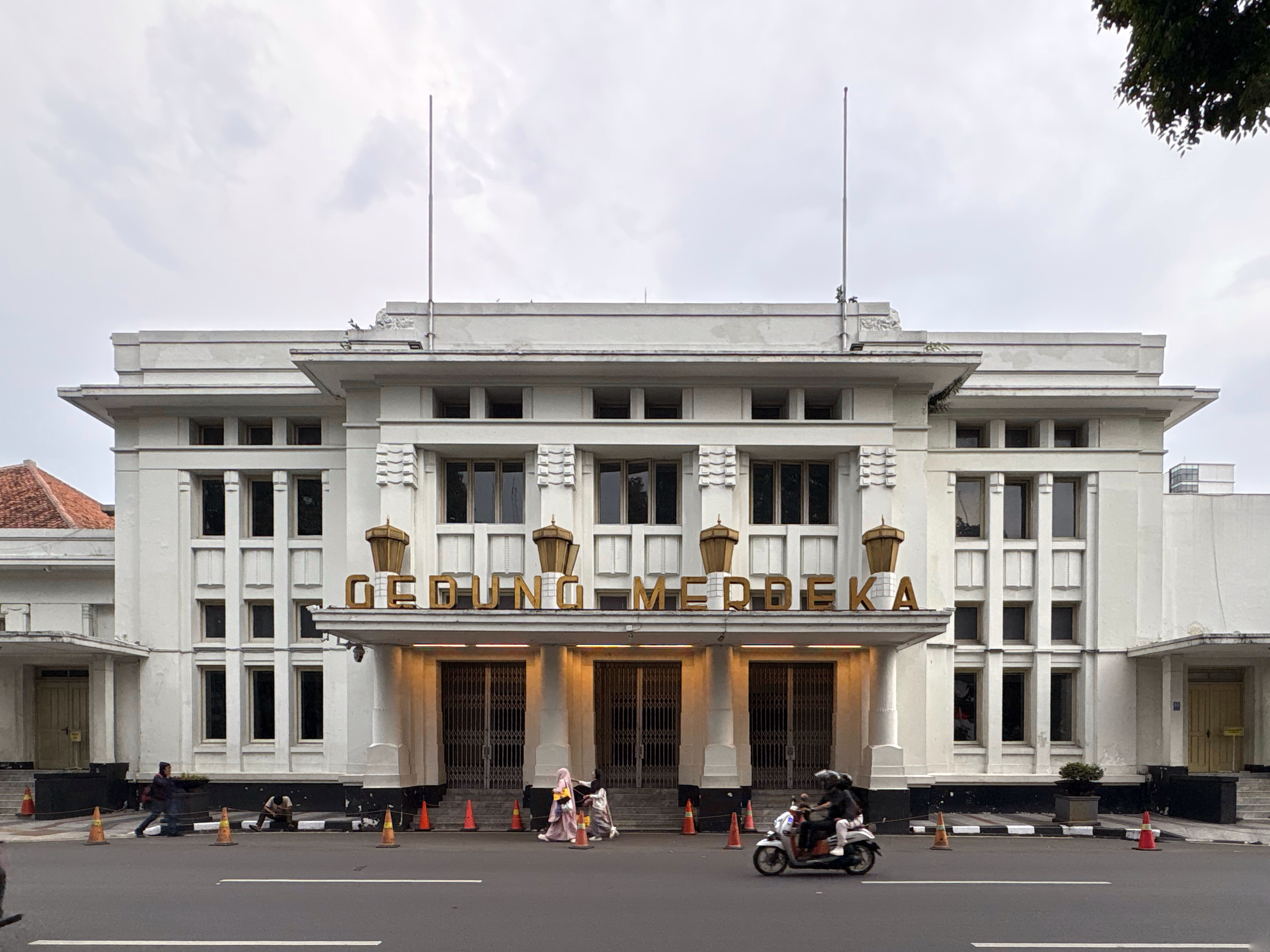
Gedung Merdeka building, Bandung, West Java, Indonesia

=== Bandung ===
- Bandung City Hall, Bandung, West Java, 1927
- Bandung Milk Centre, Bandung, West Java, 1925
- Bandung railway station, Bandung, West Java, 1928
- Bank BJB Syariah, Bandung, West Java, 1936
- Bank Pacific, Bandung, West Java, 1925
- Bio Farma building, Bandung, West Java, 1926
- Bioscoop Elita, Bandung, West Java, 1910s
- Bioscoop Dian, Bandung, West Java, 1925
- Centre Point (formerly Naessens & Co. music equipment store), Bandung, West Java, 1925
- DENIS Bank building, Bandung, West Java
- Gedung Escompoto, Bandung, West Java, 1915
- Gedung Gas Negara, Bandung, West Java, 1919
- Gedung Landmark, Bandung, West Java, 1922
- Gedung LKBN Antara, Bandung, West Java, 1936
- Gedung Pensil, Bandung, West Java, 1918
- Gedung PTPN XII, Bandung, West Java, 1930
- Gedung Rumentang Siang (formerly Bioscoop Rivoli), Bandung, West Java, 1935
- Gedung Sate, Bandung, West Java, 1924
- GPIB Bethel, Bethel Protestant Church, Bandung, West Java, 1924
- GPIB Maranatha, Maranatha Protestant Church, Bandung, West Java, 1926
- Grand Hotel Preanger (now Prama Grand Preanger), Bandung, West Java, 1929
- Het Paleis van de Legercommandant (Kodam III Siliwangi), Bandung, West Java, 1918
- Hotel Lengkong, Bandung, West Java, 1940s
- Hotel Swarha, Bandung, West Java, 1935
- Kantor Pos Besar Bandung, Bandung, West Java, 1928
- Kiaracondong railway station, Bandung, West Java, 1923
- Kologdam Building, Bandung, West Java, 1920
- Merdeka Building, Bandung, West Java, 1926
- Moh. Toha building, Bandung, West Java, 1919
- Museum Geologi, Bandung, West Java, 1928
- New Majestic, Bandung, West Java, 1924
- NIROM Radio building, Bandung, West Java, 1925
- Pikiran Rakyat office, Bandung, West Java, 1925
- Savoy Homann Hotel, (Designed by Albert Aalbers), Bandung, West Java, 1939
- SMPN 2 Main building, Bandung, West Java, 1913
- SMPN 5 Main building, Bandung, West Java, 1920
- Villa Isola, (Bumi Silliwangi, Designed by C.P. Wolff Schoemaker), Bandung, West Java, 1932
- Villa Tiga Warna, Bandung, West Java, 1937
- Warenhuis De Vries, Bandung, West Java, 1920 (current facade)

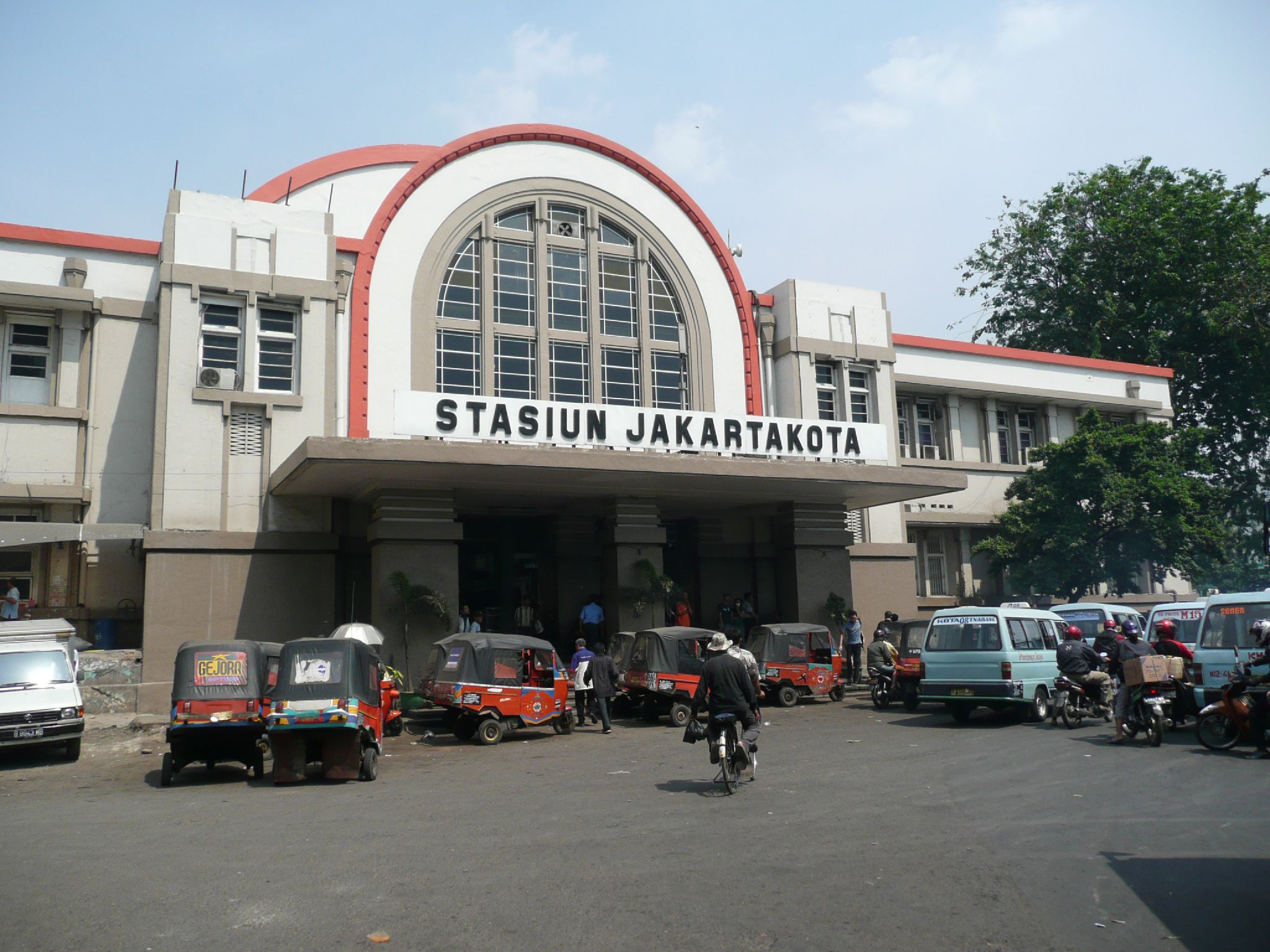
Jakarta Kota railway station, Jakarta, Indonesia

=== Jakarta ===
- Asuransi Jasa Indonesia building (formerly the West Java Handel Society), Jakarta, 1920
- Antara Building, Jakarta, 1920
- Athena Discotheque, Jakarta, 1927
- Bank Mandiri Office – Pintu Besar branch (formerly Nederlandsch-Indische Escompto Maatschappij), Jakarta, 1920
- Bank Mandiri – Jakarta-Kota branch (formerly Nederlandsch-Indische Handelsbank, Binnen Nieuwpoortstraat), Jakarta, 1940
- Bank Mandiri Office in the Pertamina headquarter complex, Jakarta, 1938
- Bank Tabungan Negara Office, Jakarta, 1938 (renovated to its current facade)
- BP7 Building (formerly the Volksraad building), Jakarta, 1927
- Building at Jl. Kunir no. 2 (formerly Geo Wehry Jakarta), Jakarta, 1928
- Cikini Post Office, Jakarta, 1920s
- Cipto Mangunkusumo General Hospital, Jakarta, 1926
- Department of Defense and Security main building (formerly Rechts Hogeschool), Jakarta, 1924
- Department of Energy and Mineral Resources main building (formerly Batavia Police Headquarter), Jakarta, 1925
- Eijkman Institute for Molecular Biology, Jakarta, 1916
- Filateli Jakarta, Jakarta, 1913
- GKI Kwitang, Jakarta, 1924
- GKI Pinangsia, Jakarta, 1952
- Hotel des Galeries, Jakarta, 1914
- Jakarta Kota railway station, Jakarta, 1928
- Jasindo building, (formerly West Java Handel Maatschappij), Jakarta, 1920
- Kota Post Office, Jakarta, 1929
- Koinonia Church, Jakarta, 1916 (current facade)
- Kunstkring Art Gallery, Jakarta, 1914
- Mandiri Museum, Jakarta, 1933
- Main building of Medical Faculty of the University of Indonesia, Jakarta, 1926
- Manggarai railway station, Jakarta, 1918
- Mausoleum O. G. Khouw, Jakarta, 1927
- Ministry of National Development Planning building, Jakarta, 1925
- Former Malacca Gallery at Jalan Malaka, Jakarta, 1923
- Metropole Jakarta, Jakarta, 1932–1949
- National Committee on Sea Transportation Safety, Ministry of Transportation Building, Jakarta, 1918
- Peruri Office, Jakarta, 1920s
- Pniel Church (Gereja Ayam), Jakarta, 1915
- Santa Maria school (Formerly Koningin Emma School), Jakarta, 1911
- St. Joseph's Church, Matraman, Jakarta, 1909 or 1924
- St. Paul's Church, Jakarta, Jakarta, 1936
- St. Theresia's Church, Jakarta, 1934
- The Hermitage Hotel, Menteng, Jakarta, 1924
- Toko Tio Tek Hong, Jakarta, 1916
- Tanjung Priuk railway station, Jakarta, 1925

=== Medan ===
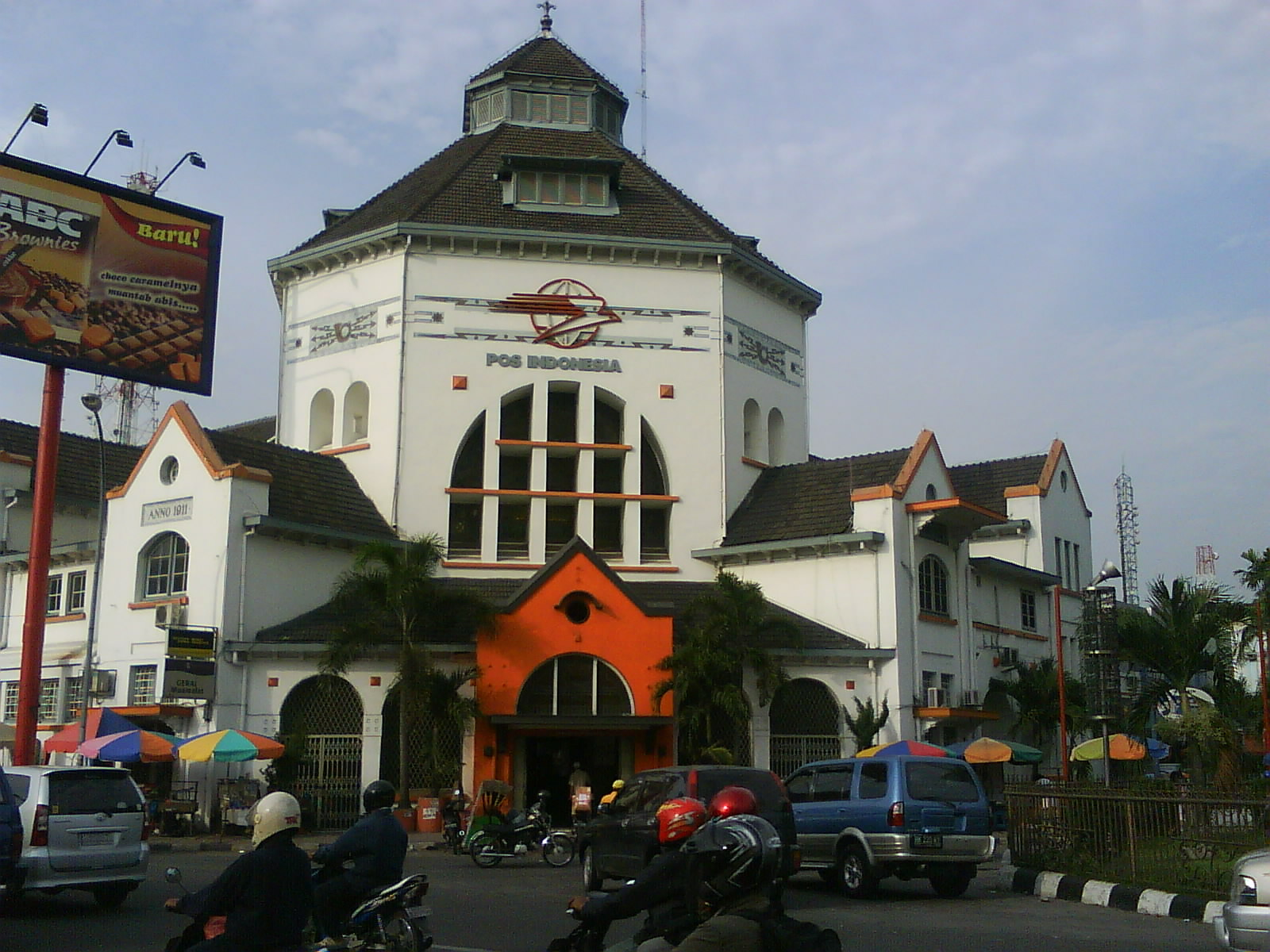
Medan Post Office, Medan, North Sumatra, Indonesia

- Bank Mandiri office at Lapangan Merdeka, Medan, North Sumatra, 1929
- BKS PPS (Badan Kerja-sama Perusahaan Perkebunan Sumatera), (Sumatra Planters Association), Medan, North Sumatra, 1918
- HKBP Sudirman Medan, Medan, North Sumatra, 1912
- Immanuel Protestant Church (formerly Nederlandse Hervormde Kerk), Medan, North Sumatra, 1921
- Kereta Api (Persero) Divisi Regional I Sumatera Utara building, Medan, North Sumatra, 1918
- Medan Cathedral, Medan, North Sumatra, 1928
- Medan Mayoral office, Medan, North Sumatra, 1930s
- Medan Railway Station, Medan, North Sumatra, 1937
- Medan Post Office, Medan, North Sumatra, 1911
- Ria Restaurant (formerly Bioscoop Rex), Medan, North Sumatra
- St. Elisabeth's Hospital, Medan, North Sumatra, 1930
- Tip Top Restaurant, Medan, North Sumatra, 1934
- Former Varekamp & Co. bookstore and printers, Medan, North Sumatra
- Warenhuis Medan, Medan, North Sumatra, 1919

=== Semarang ===
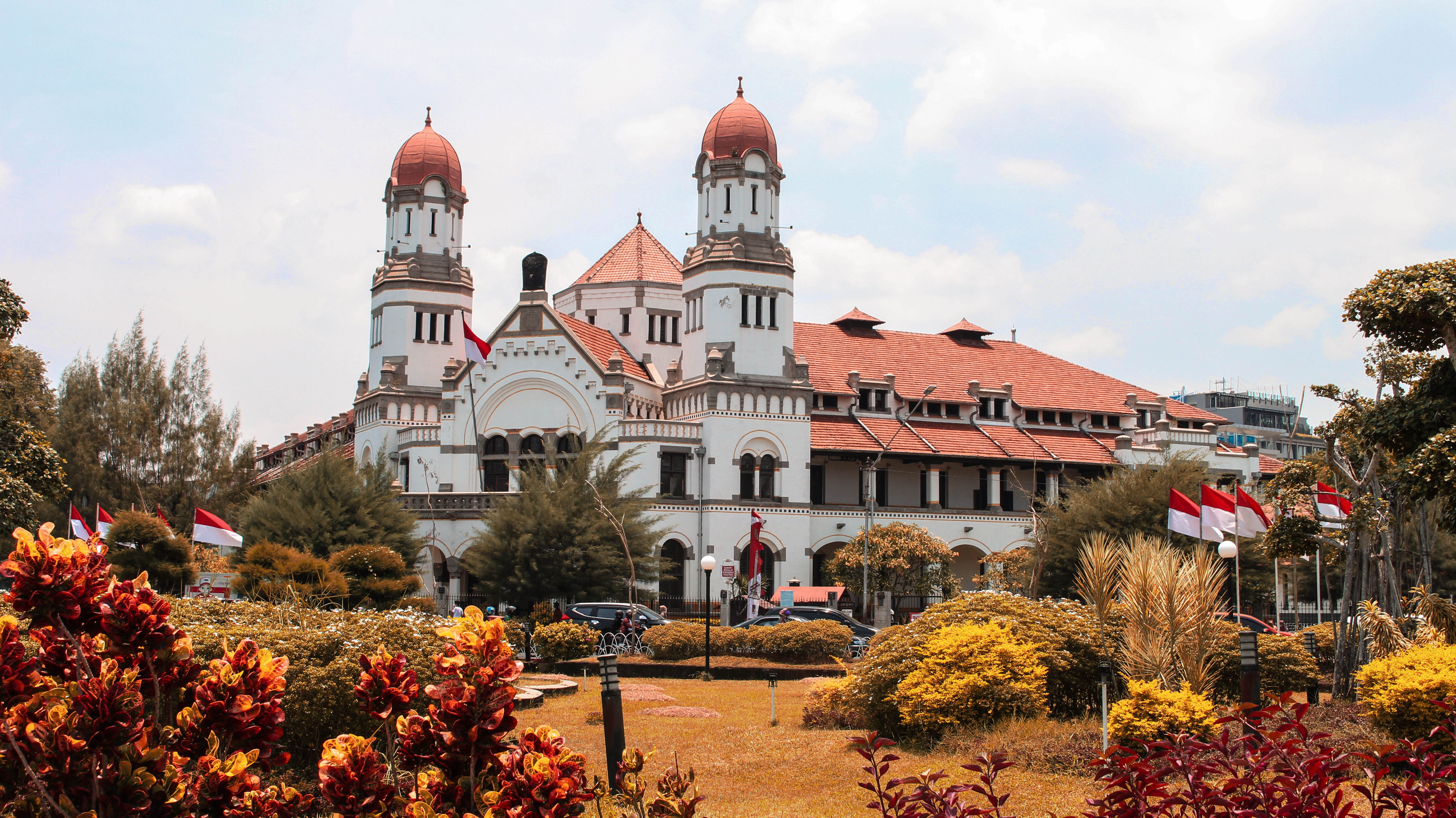
Lawang Sewu, Semarang, Central Java, Indonesia

- Bank Mandiri Office at Kepadang, Semarang, Central Java, 1930s (current facade)
- Borsumy Heritage (formerly Borneo Sumatra Handel Maatschappij), Semarang, Central Java, 1939
- Gabungan Koperasi Batik Indonesia, Semarang, Central Java, 1937
- Gedung Djakarta Lloyd, Semarang, Central Java, 1930
- Gedung Jiwarasya, Semarang, Central Java, 1916
- Holy Rosary Cathedral, Semarang, Central Java, 1927
- Lawang Sewu, Semarang, Central Java, 1919
- Mandala Bakti Museum (formerly Raad van Justitie), Semarang, Central Java, 1930
- Former Oei Tiong Ham Concern office, Semarang, Central Java, 1933
- Former PELNI office (now RAYNOX Restaurant and Bar), Semarang, Central Java, 1917
- Praoe Lajar cigarette factory, Semarang, Central Java, 1910s
- Pertamina regional office (formerly Bataafsche Petroleum Maatschappij), Semarang, Central Java, 1938
- Poncol railway station, Semarang, Central Java, 1914
- Puri Gedeh, Semarang, Central Java, 1925
- Tawang railway station, Semarang, Central Java, 1914

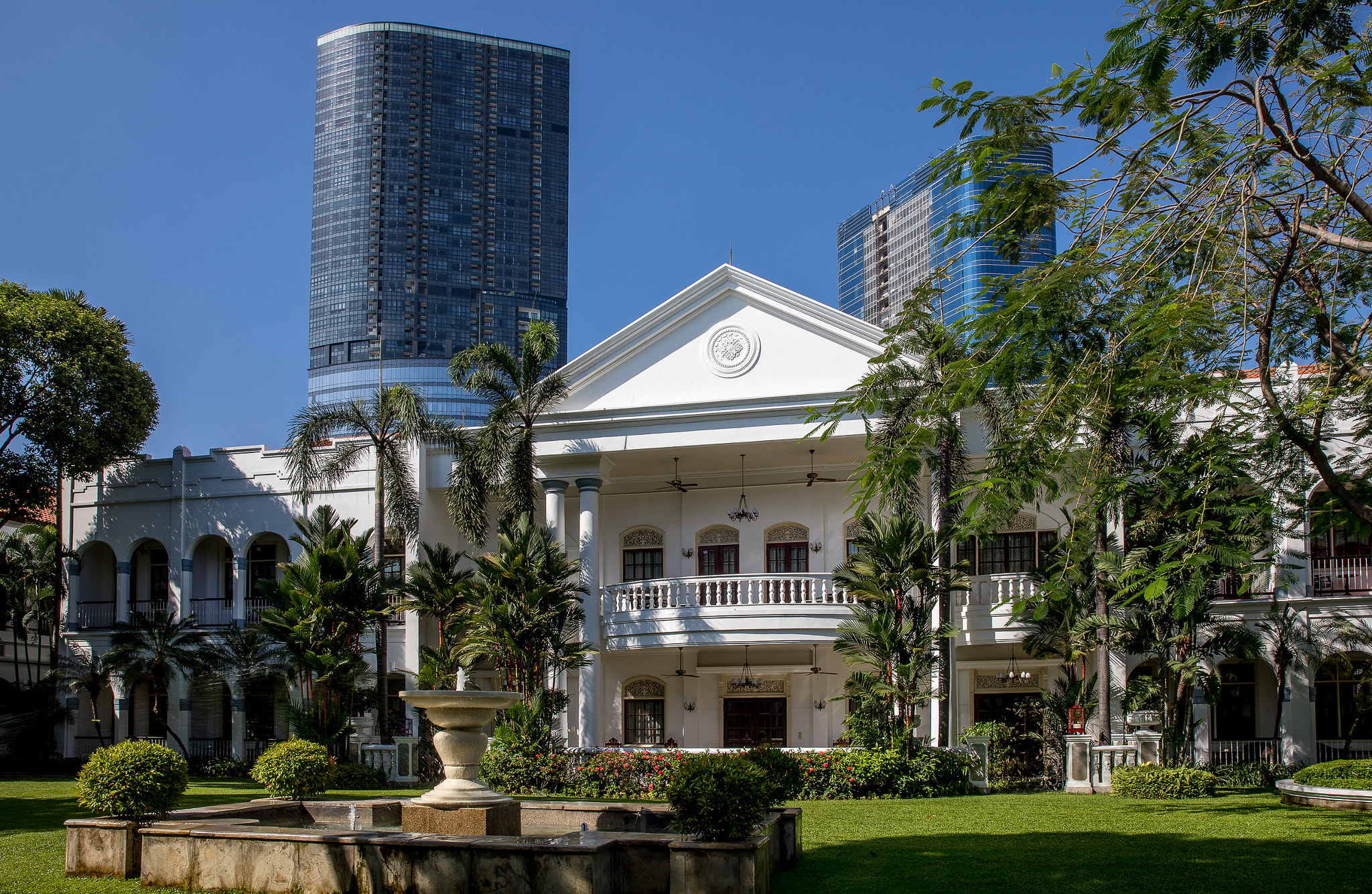
Hotel Majapahit, Surabaya, East Java, Indonesia

=== Surabaya ===
- Apotheek Rathkamp, Surabaya, East Java, 1930
- Bioskop Indra, Surabaya, East Java, 1910s
- Cigar Building, Surabaya, East Java, 1916
- City Hall, Surabaya, East Java, 1925
- East Java Governor's office, Surabaya, East Java, 1931
- Gedung Borsumij, Surabaya, East Java, 1930s
- Gedung Internatio, Surabaya, East Java, 1931
- Gedung Siola, Surabaya, East Java, 1923
- Gedung PTPN X, Surabaya, East Java, 1927 (Formerly Koloniale Bank de Soerabaja)
- Gedung PTPN XI, Surabaya, East Java, 1921
- GPIB Immanuel Surabaya, East Java, 1924
- Hotel Majapahit, Surabaya, East Java, 1930 (lobby extension)
- Jagir Dam, Surabaya, East Java, 1923
- Kantor Pos Besar, Surabaya, East Java, 1928
- Olympic Hotel, Surabaya, East Java, 1955
- Pers Perjuangan monument, Surabaya, East Java, 1925
- Radar Surabaya Office, Surabaya, East Java
- Simpangsche Apotheek, Surabaya, East Java, 1930 (current facade)

== Iran ==
- College of Engineering, University of Tehran, Tehran, 1942
- Ministry of Justice, Tehran, 1930s
- National Bank at the Bazaar, Tehran
- Ramsar Hotel, Ramsar, Mazandaran, 1933
- School for Orphans, Tehran
- Tabriz Railway Station, Tabriz, 1916, 1958

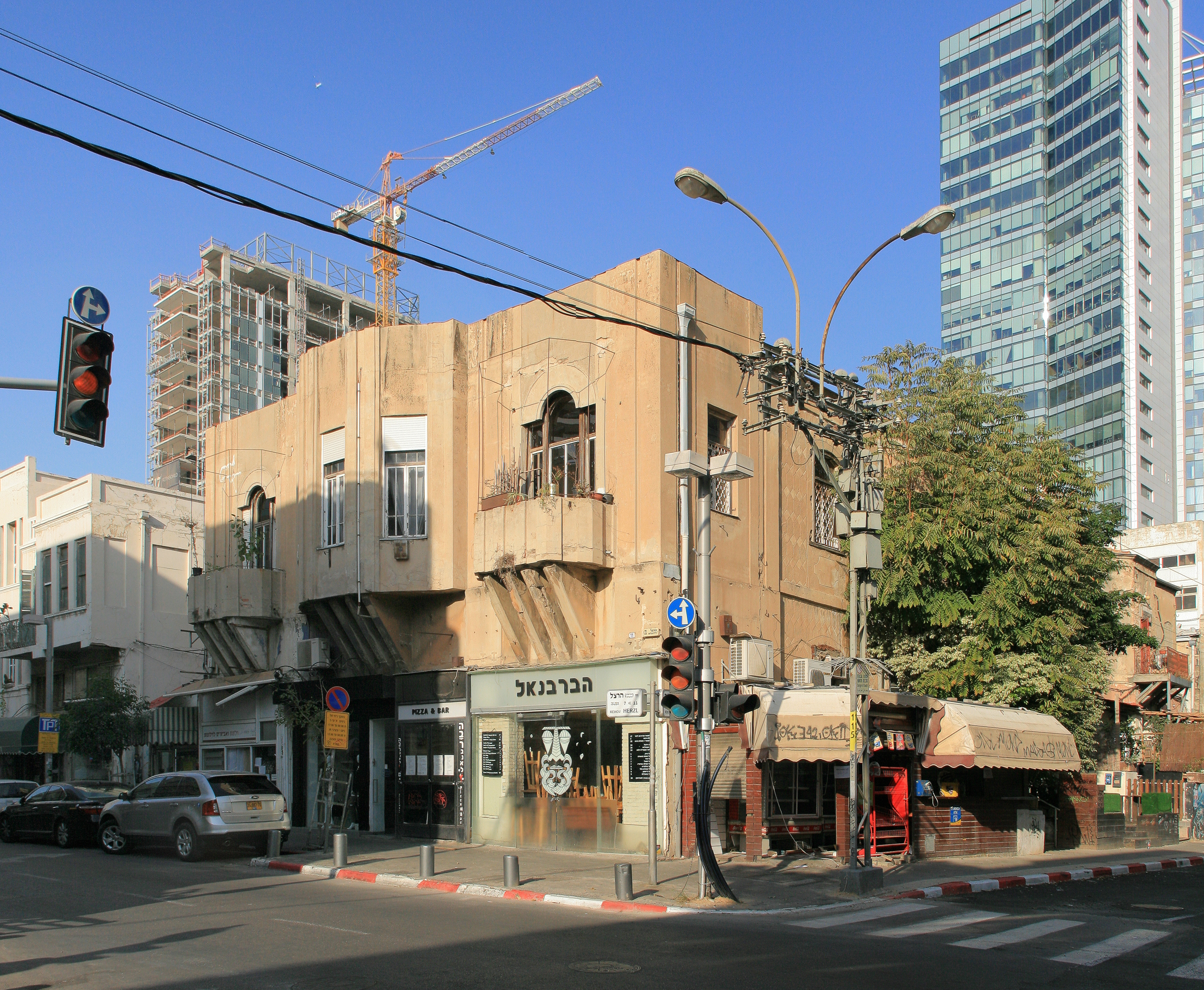
Herzl street 11, Tel Aviv-Yafo, Israel

== Israel ==
- Alhambra Cinema, Jaffa, 1937
- British War Cemetery, Jerusalem, 1927
- Generali Building, Jerusalem
- Great Synagogue, Tel Aviv, 1926 (eclectic with Art Deco elements)
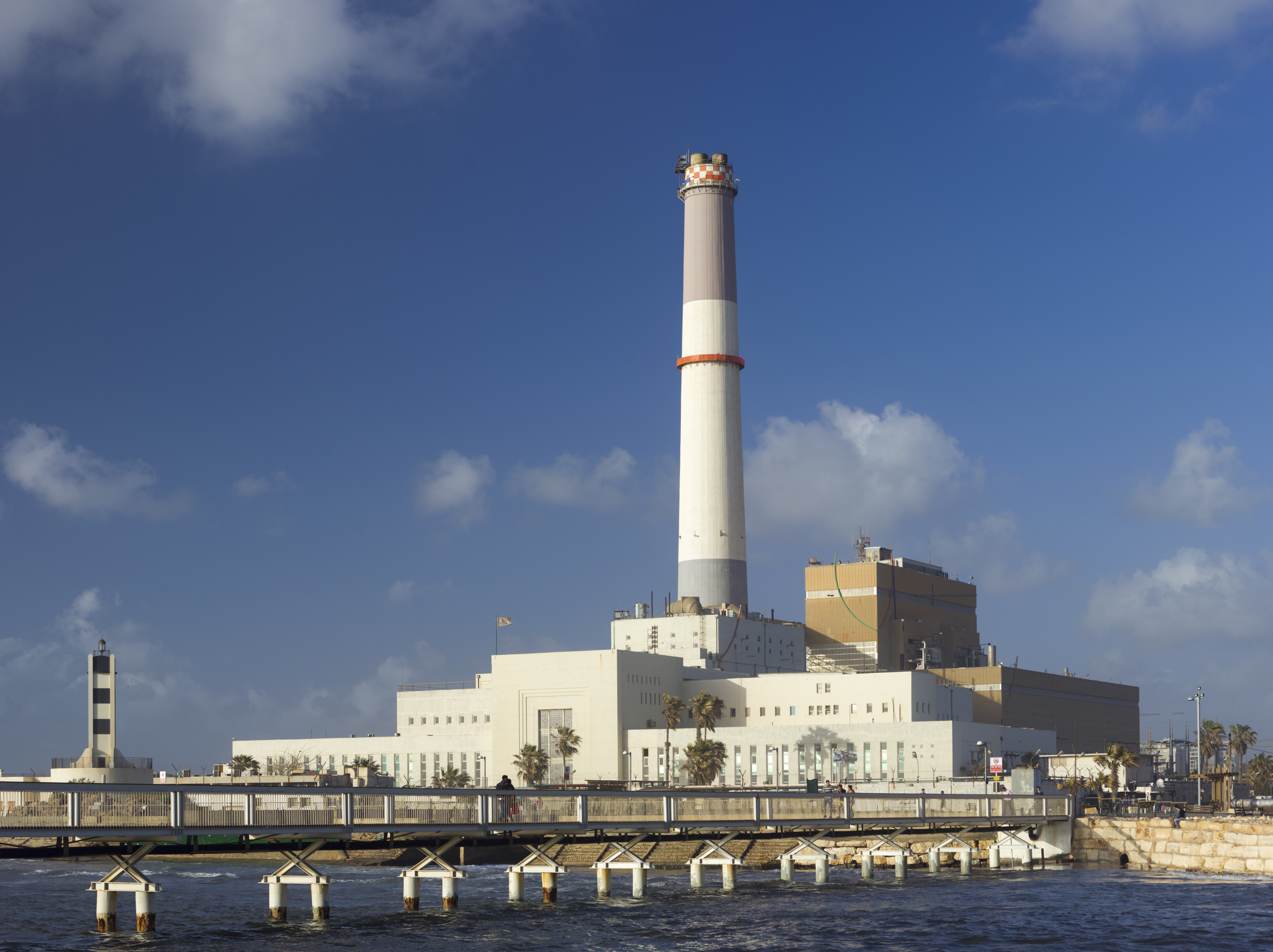
- Reading power station, Tel Aviv
  Gymnasia Rehavia high school, Rehavia, Jerusalem, 1928
- Herzl Street 11, Tel Aviv
- Schiff House, now HerzLilienblum Museum of Banking and Tel Aviv Nostalgia, Tel Aviv, 1909, 1924
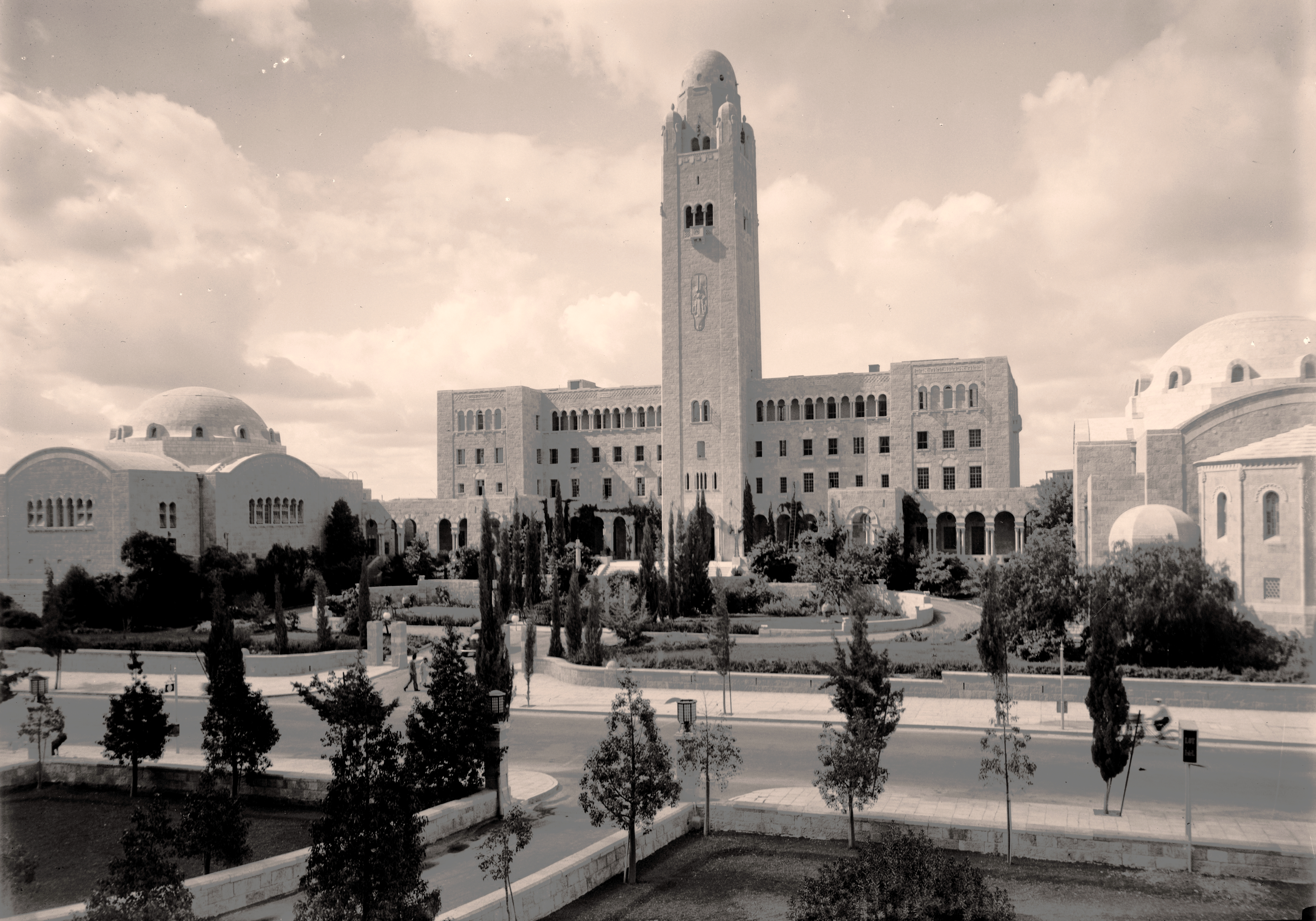
- YMCA building, Jerusalem, designed by the architect of the Empire State building
  Jerusalem International YMCA, Jerusalem, 1933
- Jewish Agency Headquarters, Rehavia, Jerusalem, 1929
- Levant Fair grounds, Tel Aviv, 1923–1936
- Mugrabi Cinema, Tel Aviv, 1930
- Old City Hall, Tel Aviv, 1924
- Palm Tree House, Tel Aviv, 1922
- former Preservation Building, Herzl Street, Tel Aviv, 1930s
- First Power Plant, now Israel Electric Corporation building, Tel Aviv, 1923
- Reading Power Station, Tel Aviv, 1938
- Rehavia neighborhood, Jerusalem, 1924
- Ohel Moed Synagogue, Tel Aviv, 1931
- Villa Salameh, now Belgian Consulate, Jerusalem, 1930

== Japan ==
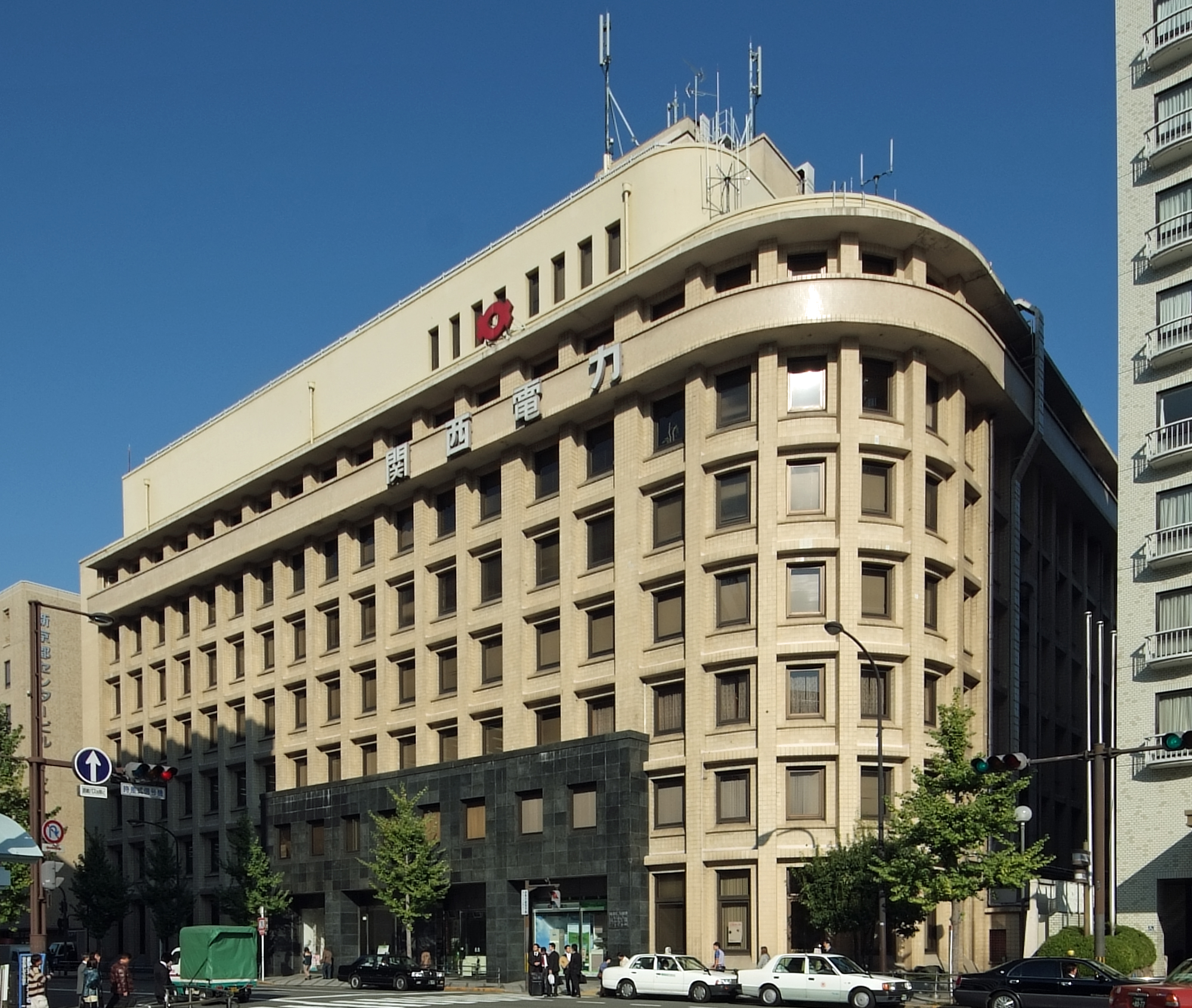
Kansai Electric Power Company, Osaka, Japan

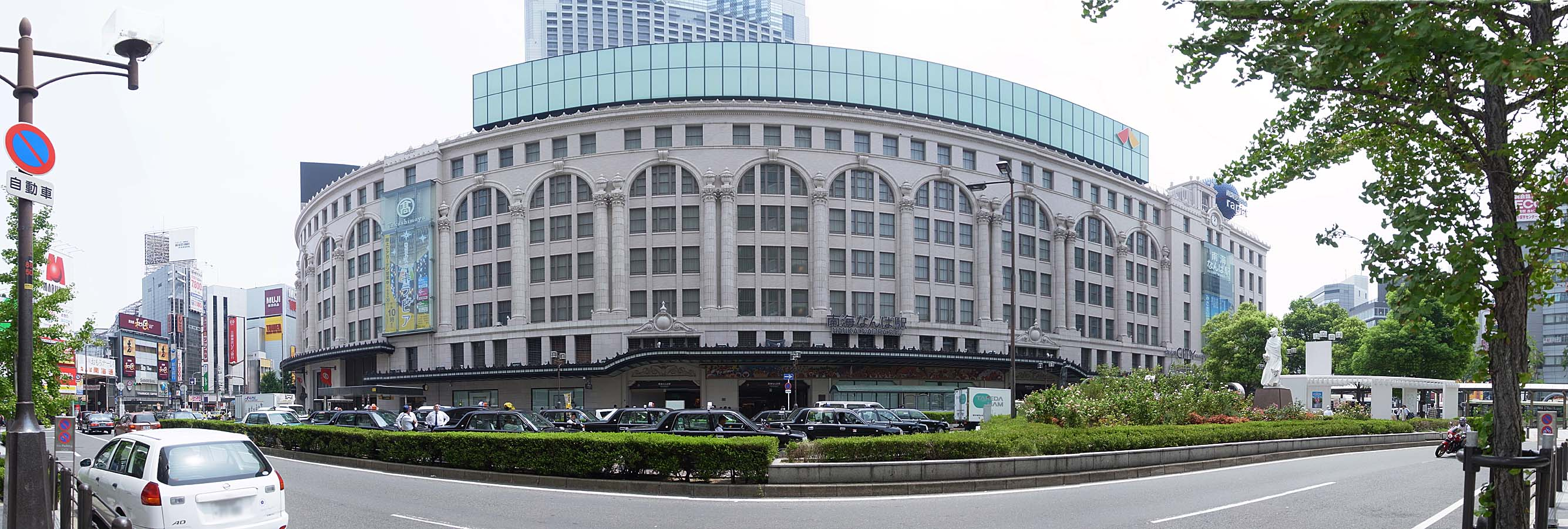
Kansai Electric Power Company, Osaka, Japan

- 1928 Building (Ichikyunachi Building) Kyoto, 1928
- Aimoto Power Station, Kurobe
- Daimaru Shinsaibashi store, Osaka, 1933
- former Japanese National Railways Kyushu Area Headquarters and former Mitsui & Co. branch, Moji-ku, Kitakyūshū, 1937
- former JR Kyushu Northern Kyushu Area Headquarters, Moji-ku, Kitakyūshū, 1935
- Hikawa Maru ship, Yokohama, 1929
- Hiroshima Peace Memorial, Hiroshima, 1915
- Hotel New Grand, Yokohama, 1927
- Imperial Hotel, Chiyoda, Tokyo, 1923
- Isetan Shinjuku main store, Shinjuku, Tokyo, 1933
- Kangawa Prefectural Building, Yokohama, 1928
- Kansai Electric Power Company, Kyoto, 1937
- Kansai Japanese-French Academy, Sakyo-ku, Kyoto, 1936
- Kobe City Archives (formerly Ikenaga Museum of Art), Kobe, 1938
- Kobe Customs Headquarters, Kobe, 1927
- Kōshien Hotel/Kōshien Kaikan, Mukogawa Women's University, Nishinomiya, Hyōgo, 1930
- Matsuzakaya Yokohama department store (formerly Nozawaya department store), Kanagawa, 1928
- Osaka City University Building No. 1, Osaka, 1934
- Osaka Security Exchange, Osaka, 1949
- Osaka Prefectural Government Main Building, Chuo-ku, Osaka, 1926
- Osaka Shochikuza theatre, Chuoku, Osaka City, 1923
- Otomeza Theater, Mitarai, Kure, 1937
- Rokko Sanjo Station, Nada-ku, Kobe, 1932
- Takashimaya Osaka Nankai building, 1932
- Takashimaya East Annex, 1928
- Toyama Prefectural Office Building, Toyama, 1935
- Toyosato Elementary School old building and auditorium, Shiga, 1937
- Yokohama Bankers Association, Yokohama, 1936
- Yokohama Customs Building, Yokohama, 1934
- Yokohama Port Opening Memorial Hall, Yokohama, 1937

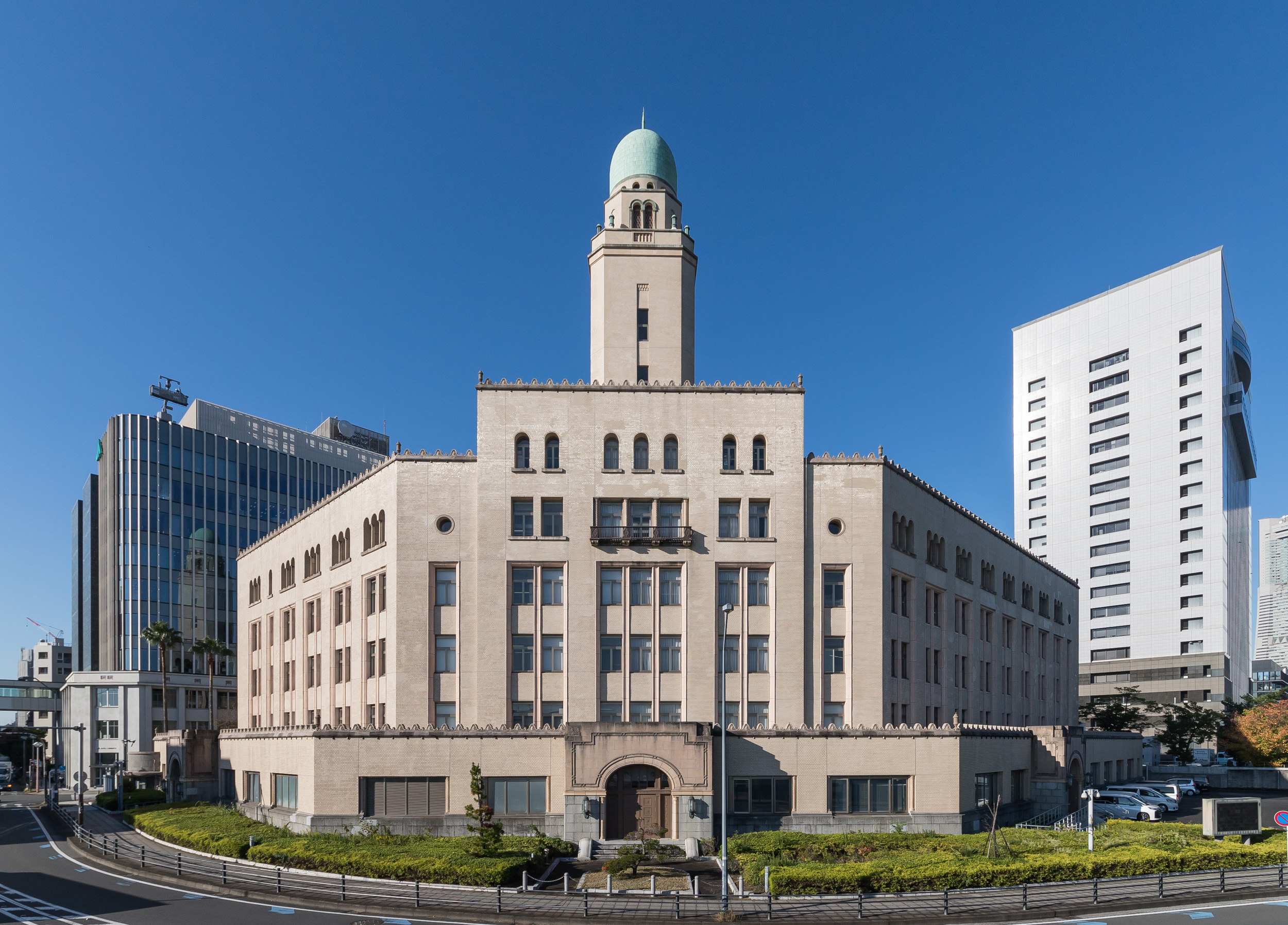
Yokohama Customs Headquarters, Kanagawa, Japan

=== Tokyo ===
- Asakusa Station/Matsuya department store, Taito, Tokyo, 1931
- Ginza Wako, Tokyo, 1923
- former Hakuhodo Head Office, Chiyoda-ku, Tokyo, 1930
- Hilltop Hotel (Yamanoue Hotel), Chiyoda, Tokyo, 1953
- Lion Beer Hall, Tokyo, 1934
- Mitsukoshi Nihonbashi, Tokyo, 1925
- Mitsukoshimae Station passageway, Tokyo, 1932
- National Diet Building, Chiyoda, Tokyo, 1936
- St. Luke's International Hospital, Tsukiji, Chuo, Tokyo, 1902, 1924
- Tokiwadai Photo Studio, Edo-Tokyo Open Air Architectural Museum, Tokyo, 1937
- Tokyo Metropolitan Teien Art Museum, (Prince Asaka Residence), Tokyo, 1933
- Tosho Bunko Library, Kita, Tokyo

== Laos ==
- Lao Chaleune Theatre, Savannakhet, 1930s
- Siensavan Cinema, Wat Visoun, Luang Prabang
- Soumpholphakdy House, Savannakhet, 1926

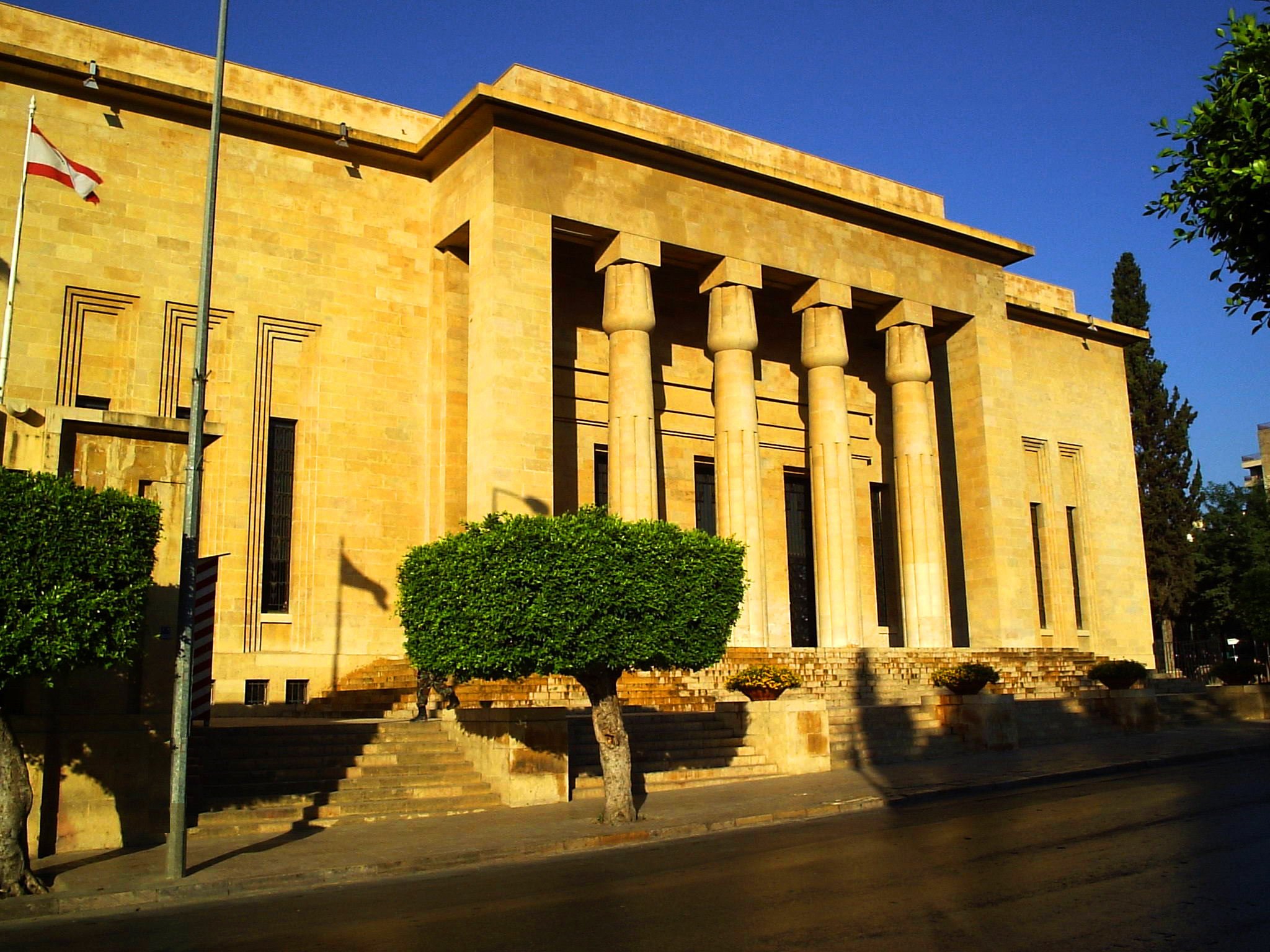
National Museum of Beirut, Beirut, Lebanon

== Lebanon ==
- Cinema Opera and Ezzeddine Building, Beirut, 1932
- Corm Building and Gardens (Ford Motor Company's Middle East headquarters), Beirut, 1929
- National Museum of Beirut, Beirut, 1937
- Nejme Square/Place de l'Étoile (including the Abed Clock Tower, Lebanese Parliament building), Beirut

== Macau ==
- Cinema Alegria/Yongle Theatre, Macau, 1952
- Teatro Apollo (now Esprit store), Macau, 1935
- Red Market, Macau, 1936
- Hotel Grande Macau, Macau, 1937

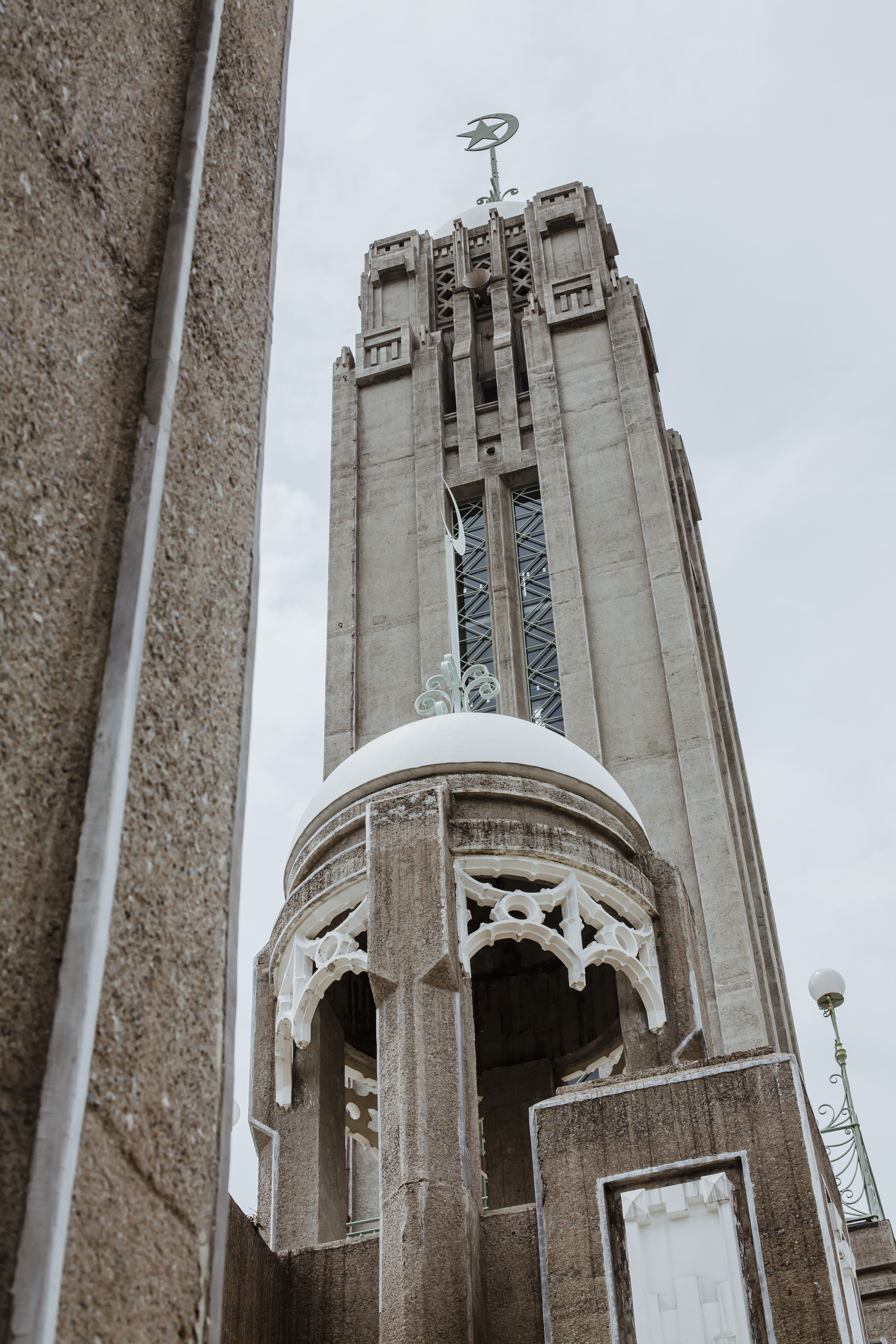
detail, Sultan Sulaiman Mosque, Selangor, Malaysia

== Malaysia ==
- Capitol Theatre, Jalan Bendahara, Malacca, 1936
- KTM Museum (former Johor Bahru railway station), Johor, 1909
- Lido Cinema, Kota Bharu, Kelantan
- Lido Theatre, Dato Onn Jafar, Ipoh, 1957
- Majestic Theater, Jalan Chamberlain Hulu, Ipoh, 1940s
- Ruby Cinema, Ipoh
- Sultan Sulaiman Mosque, Selangor, 1934
- Sungai Petani clock tower, Sungai Petani, Kedah, 1936

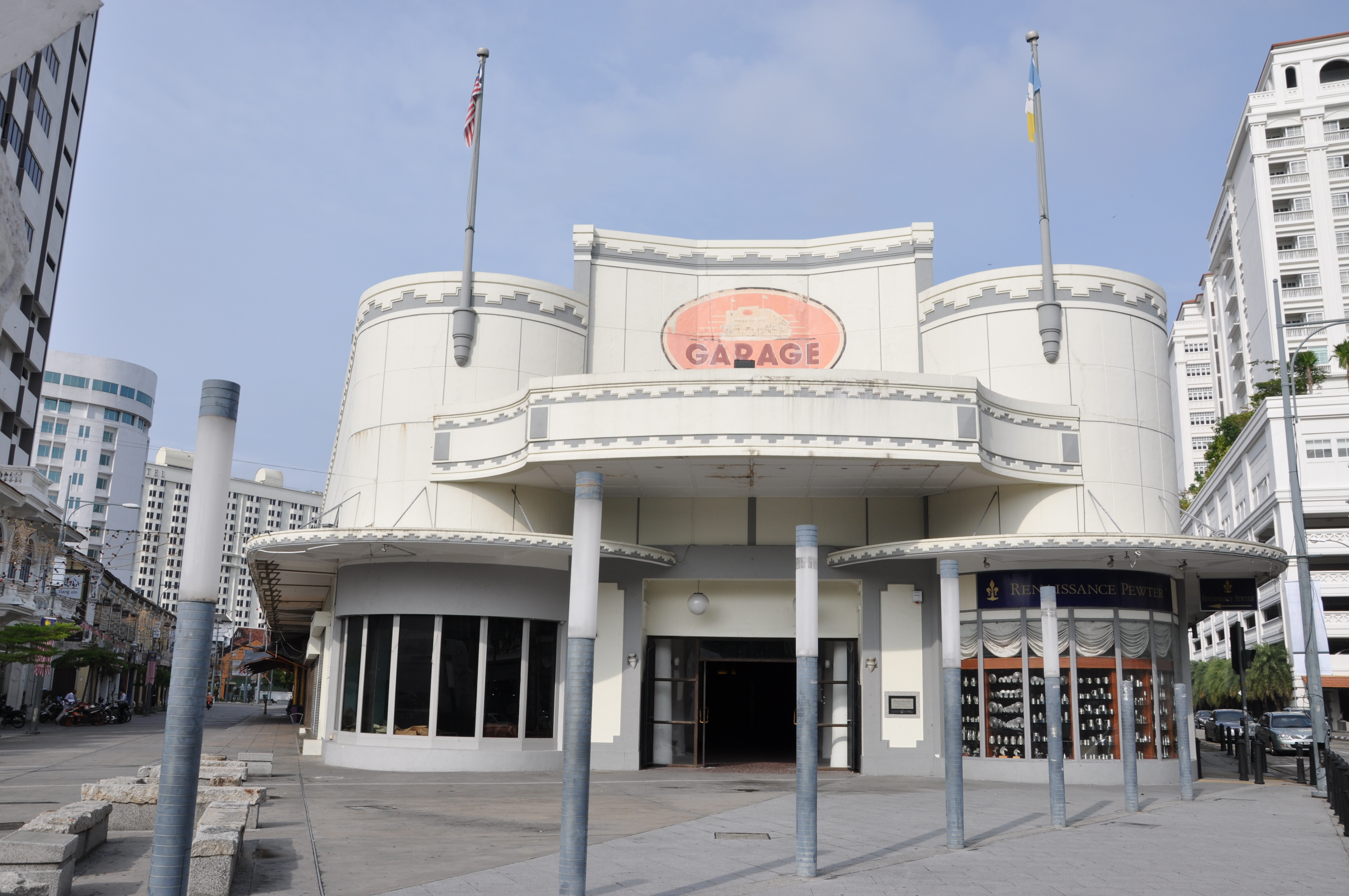
Maison De Poupée (former Garage), George Town, Penang, Malaysia

=== George Town, Penang ===
- City Rio Cafe, George Town, Penang
- Georgetown Cinema, George Town, Penang
- India House, George Town, Penang
- Maison De Poupée (former Garage), George Town, Penang
- Odeon Cinema, George Town, Penang
- Penang Masonic Temple, George Town, Penang, 1927
- Standard Chartered Bank, George Town, Penang
- The Star Theatre, George Town, Penang

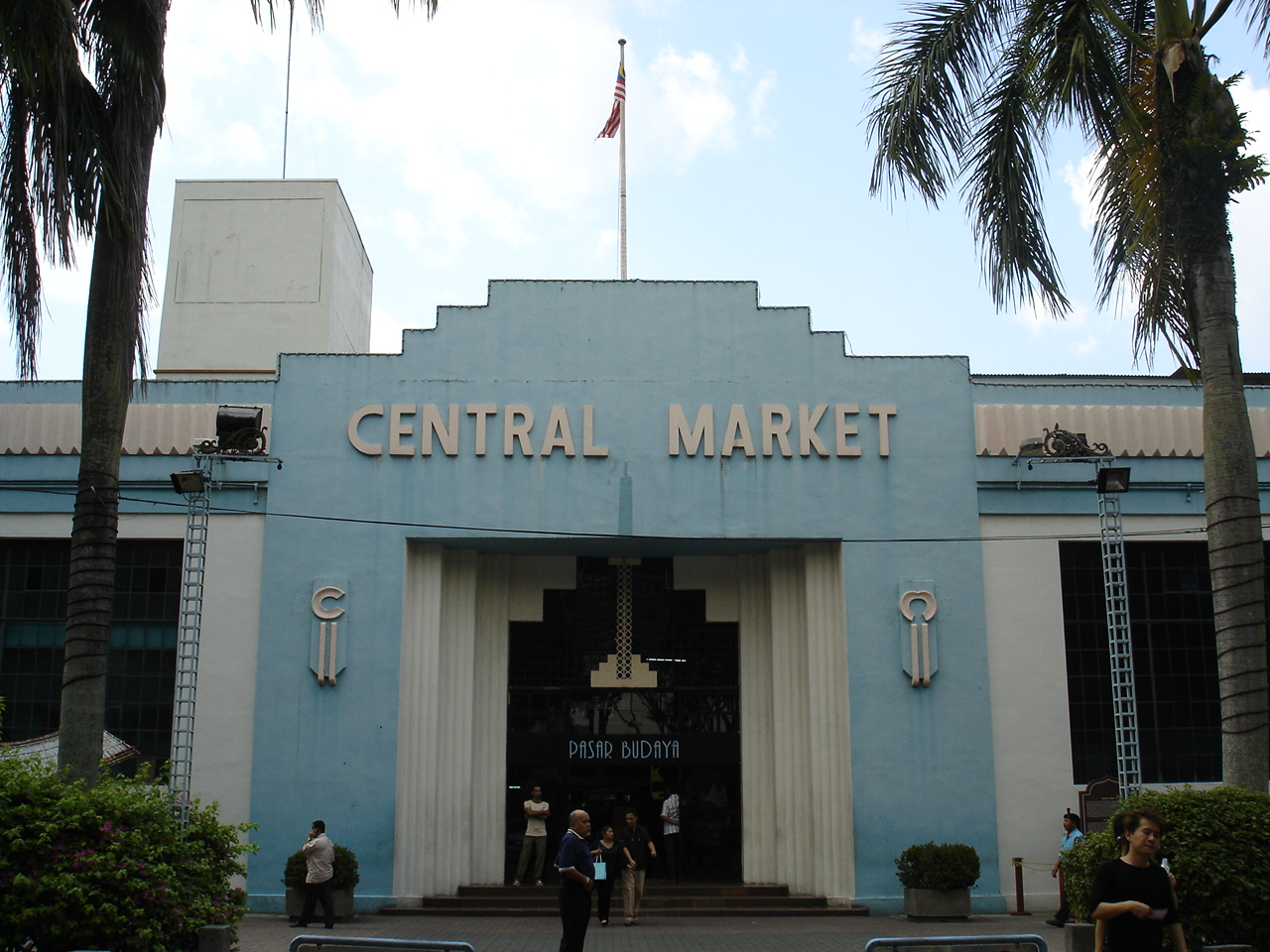
Central Market, Kuala Lumpur, Malaysia

=== Kuala Lumpur ===
- Capitol Theatre, Kuala Lumpur, 1947
- Central Market, Kuala Lumpur, 1937
- Coliseum Theatre, Kuala Lumpur, 1920
- Lee Rubber Building, High Street, Kuala Lumpur, 1930
- Market Square clock tower (behind Central Market), Kuala Lumpur, 1937
- Odeon Cinema, Jalan Tuanku Abdul Rahman, Kuala Lumpur, 1936
- Old OCBC Building, Kuala Lumpur, 1938
- Oriental Building, Kuala Lumpur, 1937
- Pavilion Cinema, Kuala Lumpur
- Perpustakaan Kanak-kanak children's library, Kuala Lumpur
- Rubber Research Institute, Jalan Ampang, Kuala Lumpur, 1935
- Wisma Ekran (Central Market), Kuala Lumpur, 1888, 1937

== Myanmar ==
- Aung Mingala Cinema, Dawei, Tanintharyi Region
- City Lite Cinema Hall, Myitkyina, Kachin State, 1951
- Hla Thiri Cinema, Minbu, Magwe Division, 1959
- Kemarat Cinema, Kengtung, Shan State
- King's Cinema, Mawlamyine, Mon State
- Min Thiha Cinema, Katha, Sagaing Region
- Myoe Gon Yaung Cinema, Mandalay, Mandalay Region
- Myoma Cinema, Pyin Oo Lwin, Mandalay Region
- San Thit Cinema, Ma-ubin, Irrawady Region, 1963
- Sein Mit Tar, Hsipaw, Shan Statem 1964
- Shwe Hintha Cinema, Bago, Bago Region
- Starlight Cinema, Bhamo, Khachin State, 1959
- Tun Thiri Cinema, Pyay, Bago Region
- Win Cinema, Taungoo, Bago Region, 1961
- Win Lite Cinema, Mandalay, Mandalay Region
- Yazuna Cinema, Pyin Oo Lwin, Mandalay Region
- Zabudipa Cinema, Bhamo, Kachin State

=== Yangon ===
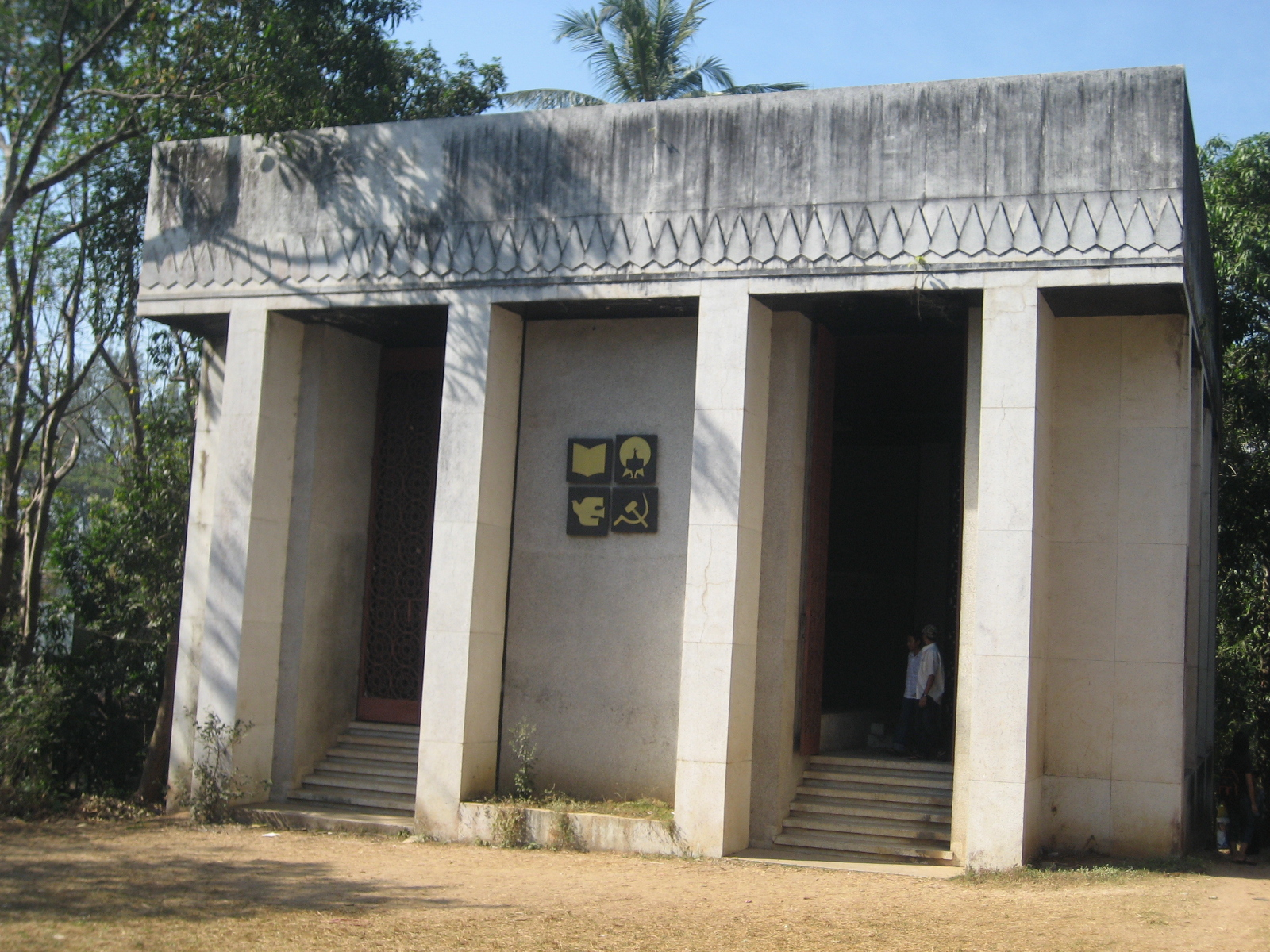
Thakin Kodaw Hmaing Mausoleum, Yangon, Rangoon, Myanmar

- Agricultural Development Bank, Yangon, 1930
- Bayint Cinema (King Cinema), Yangon
- Hsuhtupan Cinema, Yangon
- Myanma Economic Bank No. 2, (formerly the Chartered Bank), Yangon, 1941
- Myanma Port Authority, Yangon
- Myoma and Shwe Gon Cinemas, Yangon, late 1940s
- Nay Pyi Daw Cinema Hall, Yangon
- Su Htoo Pan Cinema, Yangon
- Thakin Kodaw Hmaing Mausoleum, Yangon, 1966
- Thamada Cinema, Yangon
- Thwin Cinema, Yangon
- Waziya Cinema, Yangon
- Yadanabon Cinema, Yangon

== Pakistan ==
- House of Syed Abul A'la Maududi, Lahore
- Qamar House, Karachi, 1951

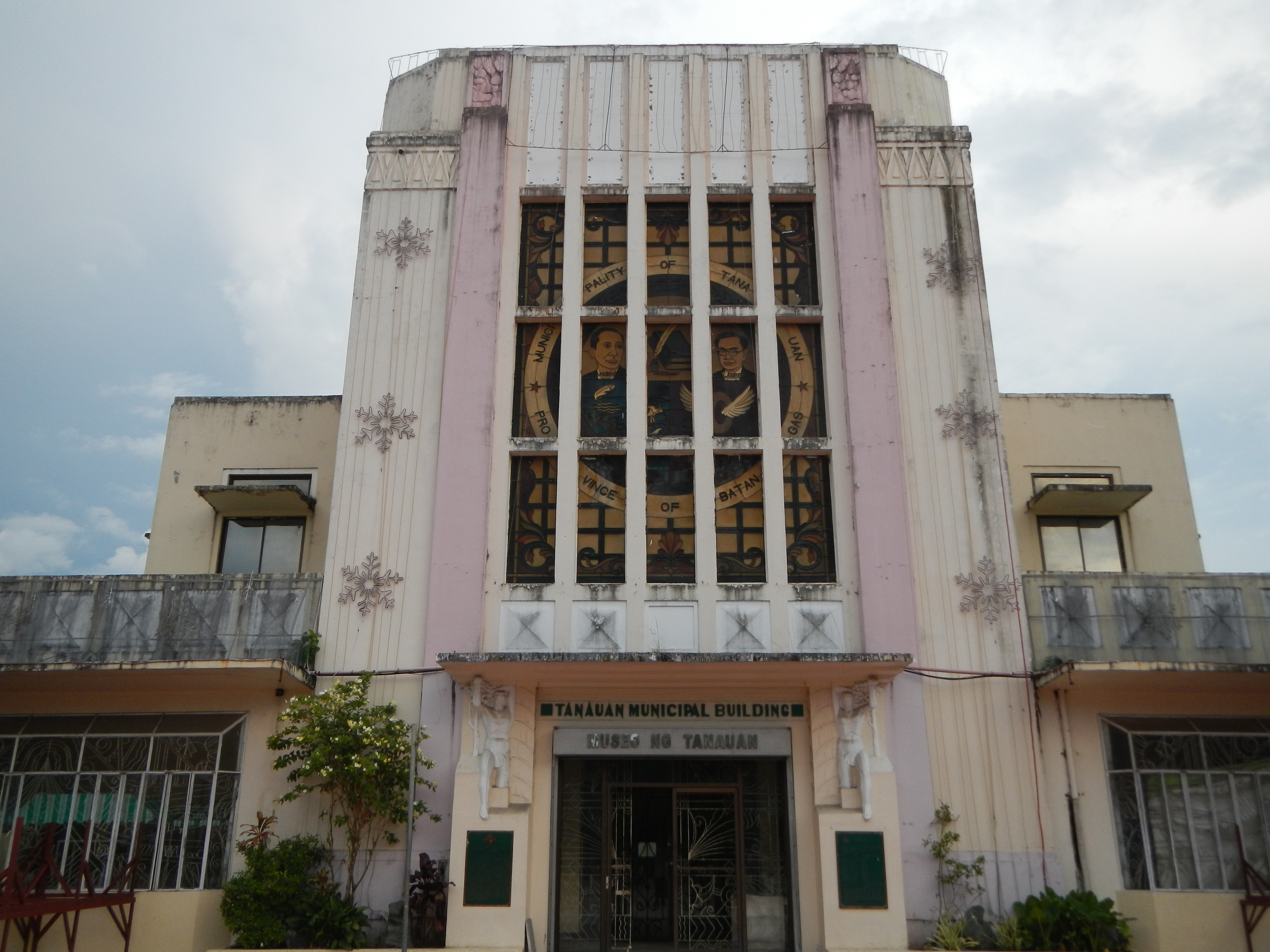
Tanauan Museum, Old Municipal Building, Tanauan, Batangas, Philippines

== Philippines ==
- Antipolo Cathedral, Antipolo, Rizal, 1954
- Bauan Municipal Hall, Juan M. Arellano, Bauan, Batangas, 1930
- City Hall, Surigao City, Surigao del Norte
- Daku Balay, (Salvador Cinco), Bacolod City, Negros Occidental, 1936
- Dr. Jose Corteza Locsin Ancestral House, Silay, Negros Occidental, 1930s
- Far Eastern University Campus, Sampaloc, Manila, 1940s
- Hotel Tiffany, Laoag, Ilocos Norte
- Iglesia Filipina Independiente, Laoag, Ilocos Norte
- Immaculate Conception Cathedral, Urdaneta, Pangasinan
- Misamis Occidental Provincial Capitol, Oroquieta, Misamis Occidental, 1935
- Novo Department Store, Laoag, Ilocos Norte
- Provincial Capitol, Surigao City, Surigao del Norte
- Roman Catholic Church, Oroquieta, Misamis Occidental
- Tacloban City Hall, Tacloban, Leyte
- Tanauan Museum (old municipal building), Tanauan, Batangas, 1920s
- La Union Provincial Capitol, San Fernando, La Union
- Vi-Car Building, Dagupan, Pangasinan

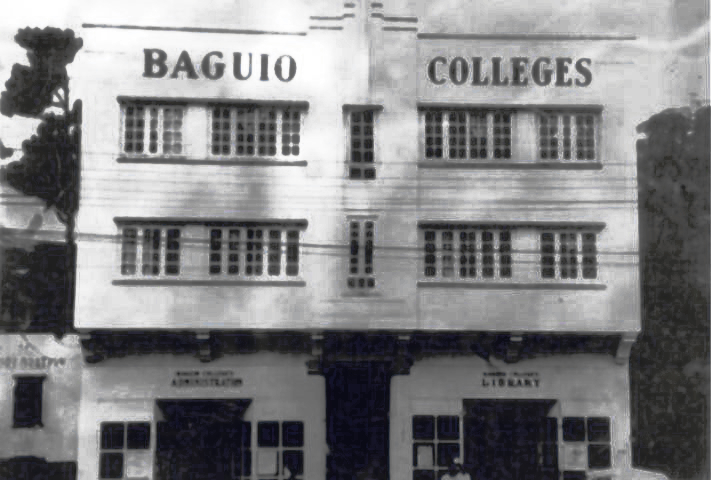
Baguio Colleges, Baguio, Benguet, Philippines

=== Benguet Province ===
- Baguio Colleges, Baguio, Benguet
- Bayanihan Hotel and Commercial Building, Baguio, Benguet
- Benguet Auto Lines Station (Pablo Antonio), Baguio, Benguet
- Hotel City Lunch, Baguio, Benguet
- Iglesia ni Cristo Lokal ng Baguio, Baguio, 1954
- Philippine Military Academy (PMA) Melchor Hall, Baguio, Benguet, 1950
- Pines Theater, Fernando H. Ocampo, Baguio, Benguet, 1939
- Philippine National Bank (PNB), Baguio, Baguio, Benguet
- Plaza Theater, Baguio, Benguet
- Session Road buildings Baguio, Benguet
- Session Theater, (Fernando Ocampo), Baguio, Benguet
- Sunshine Bakery, Baguio, Benguet

=== Bohol ===
- Capitol Theater, Tagbilaran, Bohol, 1940

=== Bulacan Province ===
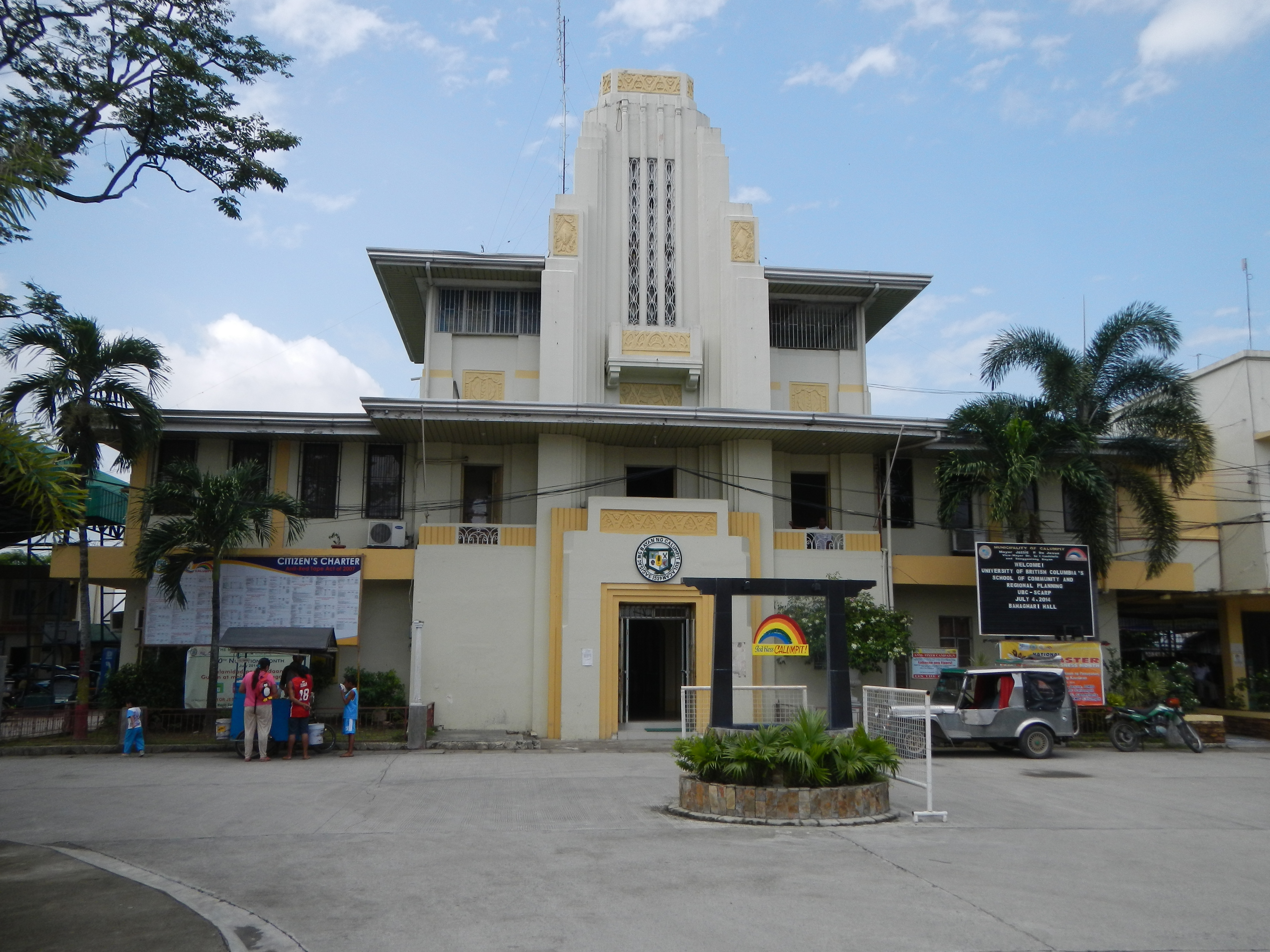
Calumpit Municipal Hall, Calumpit, Bulacan, Philippines

- Bulacan Provincial Capitol, Malolos, Bulacan, 1930
- Calumpit Municipal Hall, Calumpit, Bulacan
- Dr. Luis Santos Ancestral House, Malolos, Bulacan, 1933
- Ipo Dam Tower, Norzagaray, Bulacan, 1935
- Malolos City Hall, Malolos, Bulacan

=== Camarines Sur Province ===
- Alex Theater, Naga, Camarines Sur
- Carmelite Chapel, Naga, Camarines Sur
- Jaucian House, Libmanan, Camarines Sur, 1926
- Morales Ruins, Libmanan, Camarines Sur, 1937
- Nacieno House, Libmanan, Camarines Sur

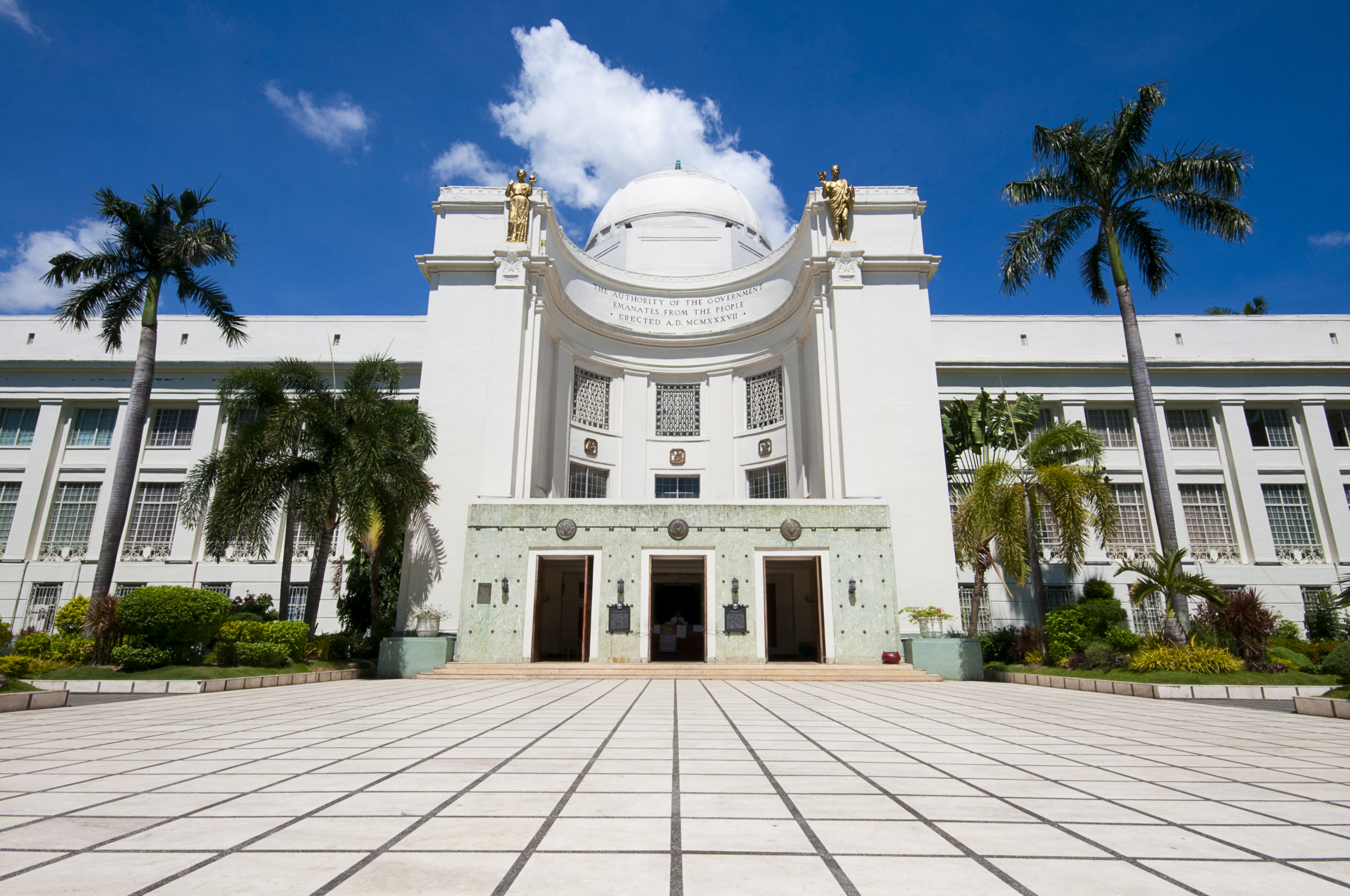
Cebu Provincial Capitol Compound, Cebu City, Philippines

=== Cebu Province ===
- Alliance française, Cebu City, Cebu
- Cebu Provincial Capitol, (Juan M. Arellano), Cebu City, Cebu, 1938
- Gotiaoco Building, Cebu City, Cebu
- Lapulapu Monument, Lapu-Lapu City/Opon, Cebu, 1933(demolished)
- Oriente Theater (Fernando Ocampo), Cebu City, Cebu
- University of the Philippines Cebu administration building, Cebu City, Cebu

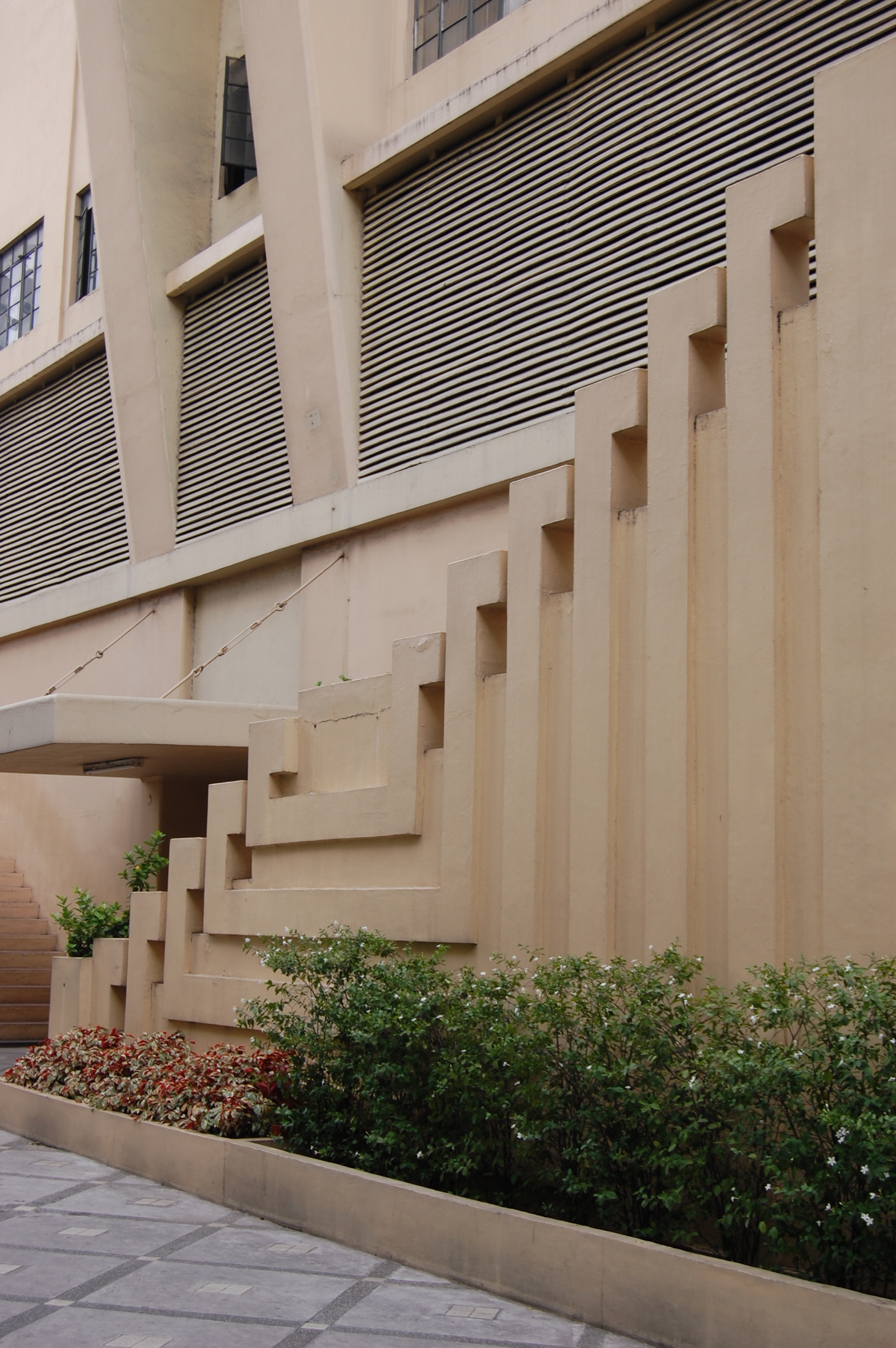
FEU Administration Bldg., Manila, Philippines

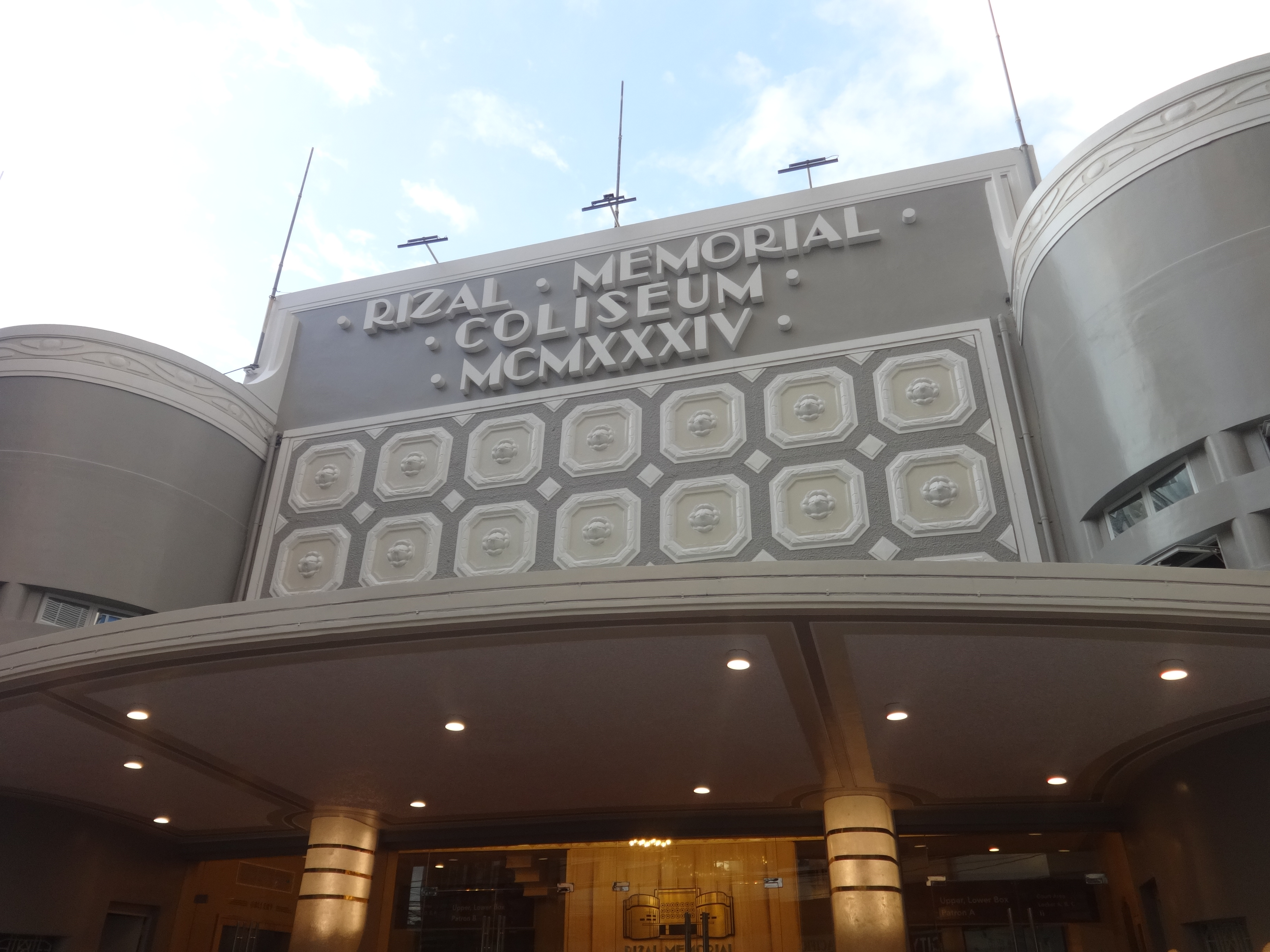
Rizal Memorial Coliseum, Manila, Philippines

=== Manila ===
- Afable Building, Manila, 1931
- Aguinaldo's Building, Manila, 1931
- Angela Apartments, (Fernando Ocampo), Manila, 1936
- Astoria Building, Manila
- Ateneo Auditorium, (Juan Nakpil), Manila, 1936
- Avenue Theater, (Juan Nakpil), Manila, 1939 (demolished)
- Bautista-Nakpil Pylon in Manila North Cemetery, (Juan Nakpil), Santa Cruz, Manila
- Bel-Air Apartments, (Pablo Antonio), Manila, 1937
- Bellevue Theater, Manila, 1934
- Benipayo Press building, Manila
- Capitan Gonzaga Residence, (Pablo Antonio), Manila
- Capitol Theater, (Juan Nakpil) Manila, 1935
- Central Hotel, (Capitan Pepe Building, Juan Nakpil), Manila, 1938
- Central Institute of Technology, Manila
- Centro Escolar University, Manila
- Chapel of the Crucified Christ, Saint Paul University Manila (Andrés Luna de San Pedro), Manila, 1927
- Chapel of the Most Blessed Sacrament, De La Salle University (Tomás Mapúa), Manila, 1939
- Chevrolet building, Romualdez Street, north of U.N. Avenue, Manila (demolished)
- Cine Astor, Manila (demolished)
- Coca-Cola Bottling Plant, (Gabler-Gumbert), Manila
- Commercial building on Calle Santa Potenciana corner Calle Solana
- Crystal Arcade, (Andrés Luna de San Pedro, 1932)(demolished)
- De Ocampo Eye Clinic, Manila (demolished)
- Elena Apartments, (Juan Nakpil), Manila, 1935 (demolished)
- Ever Theater, Manila
- Far Eastern University buildings and Auditorium, (Pablo Antonio), Manila, 1939–49
- First United Building, (Andrés Luna de San Pedro), Manila, 1928
- Forum Theatre, (Juan Nakpil), Manila, 1968
- Francisco Villa Roman Foundation School, (Juan Nakpil), Malate, Manila
- Gaiety Theater, (Juan Nakpil), Manila, 1935 (demolished)
- G. Apacible Bridge, Manila
- Go Lam Co Hardware & Plumbing Co. Building, Manila
- Grand Theater, Manila (demolished)
- Great Eastern Hotel, Manila (demolished)-This was the tallest art-deco hotel in the Philippines.
- Hap Hong Building, Manila, 1938
- Heacock Building, (Fernando Ocampo, Tomas Arguelles, and George Koster), Manila, 1938(demolished)
- Hidalgo-Lim house, (Juan Nakpil), Manila, 1930
- High Commissioner's Residence, 1940
- Hotel Filipinas, (Chow King, Recto Ave. cor. Rizal Ave.), Manila
- Ideal Theater, (Pablo Antonio), Manila, 1933 (demolished)
- Ides O'Racca Building, Manila, 1935
- Iglesia Unida Ecumenical Templo Central, Manila
- Insular Life Building, (Fernando de la Cantera and William James Odom), Manila, 1930 (demolished)
- Javellana house (Juan Nakpil), Manila (demolished)
- L. R. Papa Pension, Manila
- La Estrella del Norte building, (Savory Restaurant), Manila (demolished)
- Lacson house (Juan Nakpil), Manila (demolished)
- Laperal Apartments, Manila (demolished)
- Life Theater, (Pablo Antonio), Manila, 1941
- Lyric Theater (Pablo Antonio renovation), Manila, 1937 (demolished)
- Manila Central University Administration and Pharmacy, Manila
- Manila Hotel, (Andrés Luna de San Pedro, 1935 renovation)
- Manila Jai Alai Building, (Welton Beckett, 1940) (demolished)
- Manila Metropolitan Theater, (Juan M. Arellano), Manila, 1931
- Manila Police District building, Manila
- Manila Port Terminal Building, Manila, 1939
- Manuel F. Tiaoqui Building, Santa Cruz, Manila
- Marsman Building, (Port Authority Building, Juan Arellano), Manila, 1938
- Mayflower Building, Manila, 1938
- Meralco Building, (Juan Nakpil), Manila, 1936 (demolished)
- Metropolitan Waterworks and Sewerage System branch no. 5 building, Recto Avenue, Manila
- Miramar Apartments (New Miramar Hotel), Manila, 1932
- Myers Building, (Velco Building), Manila
- Narcisa Building, Manila
- National Teachers College, Manila
- Orchid Garden Hotel, (Pablo Antonio), Manila, 1930
- Pako Building, Manila, 1939
- Paterno Building, (Fernando Ocampo), Manila, 1929
- Philippine Business for Social Progress building, Manila
- Philippine Christian University, Manila
- Philippine Coast Guard Building, Manila
- Pink house on Paris Street, Manila (demolished)
- Quezon Bridge, Manila, 1939
- Radio Theater, Manila, 1929 (demolished)
- Ramon Roces Building, (Pablo Antonio), Manila
- Rex Theater, Manila
- Rizal Memorial Baseball Stadium, Manila, 1934
- Rizal Memorial Coliseum, Manila, 1934
- Rizal Memorial Sports Complex, Malate, Manila, 1934
- Rizal Memorial Stadium, Manila, 1934
- Saint Cecilia's Hall, St. Scholastica's College, (Andrés Luna de San Pedro), Manila, 1932
- San Lazaro Racetrack, (Juan Nakpil), Manila (demolished)
- Scala Theater, (Pablo Antonio), Manila
- Scottish Rite Temple, Manila, 1930s
- Singson Building, Manila
- South Syquia Apartments, Manila
- St. Paul United Methodist Church, Manila
- State Theater, (Juan Nakpil), Manila, 1935 (demolished)
- Syquia Building/Michel Apartments, (Francis Mandelbaum), Manila (demolished)-This was the tallest art-deco apartment building in the Philippines.
- Times Theater, (Luis Araneta), Manila, 1939
- Tivoli Theater, Manila (demolished)
- University of Manila Main Building
- U.S.T. Central Seminary, (Fernando H. Ocampo), Manila, 1933
- U.S.T. Clinic, Cooperative, Gym, High School, Manila
- U.S.T. Press building, Manila, 1950 (demolished)
- U.P. University Theater, Manila (demolished)
- University Club, (de la Cantera), Manila (demolished)
- University of Santo Tomas Central Seminary Building, Manila, 1933
- Uy Su Bin Building, Manila
- Warehouse, Railroad St. corner 22nd St., Manila
- Y.I.C. Building, Manila (demolished)
- Yutivo Building, (Arthur Julius Nicolaus Gabler-Gumbert), Manila, 1922
- YSS Laboratories building, Manila

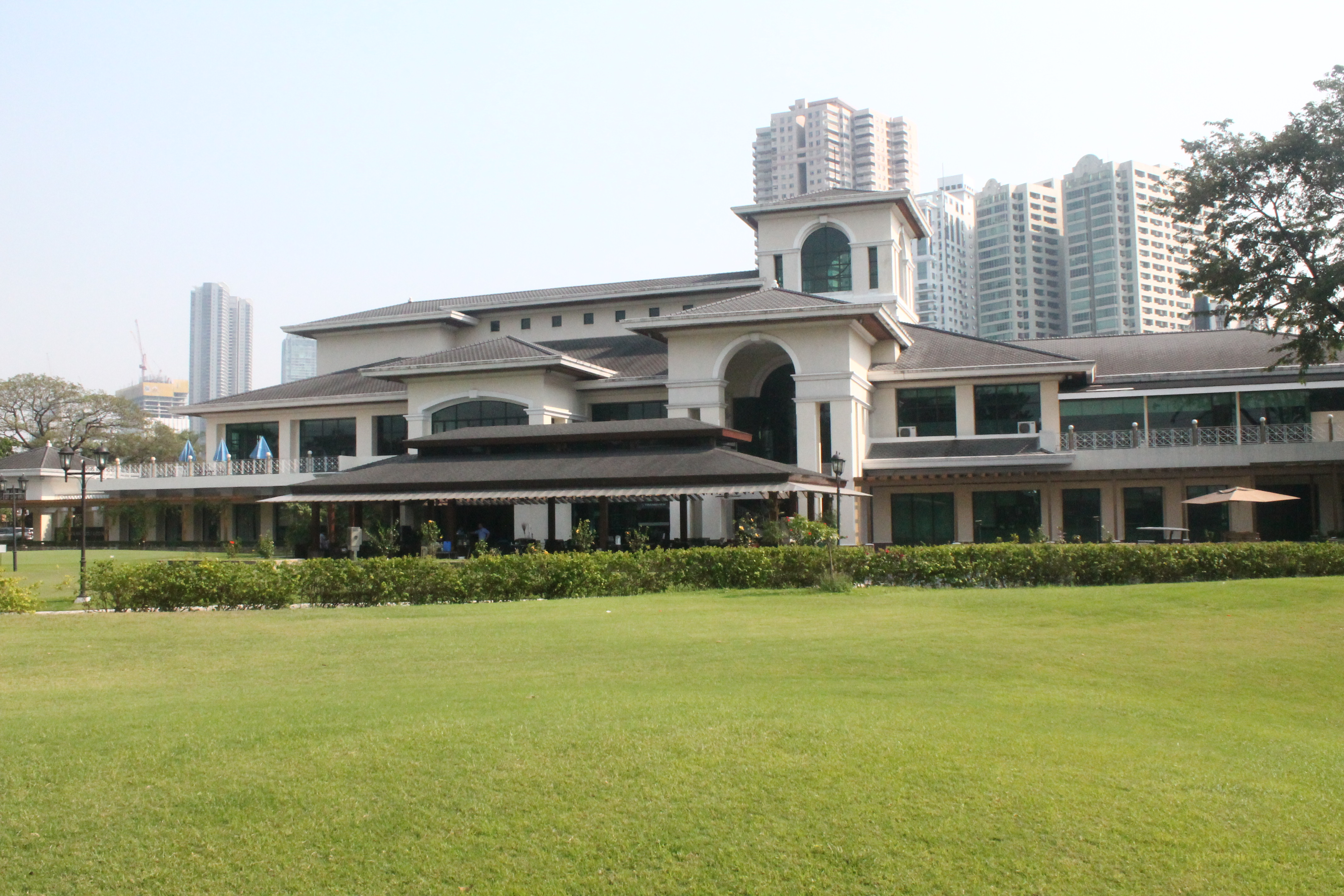
Wack Wack Golf and Country Club, Mandaluyong, Metro Manila, Philippines

=== Metro Manila ===
- Ang Tibay Factory, Caloocan
- Baclaran Church, Parañaque, 1932
- Balintawak Beer Brewery (demolished), Valenzuela
- Biological Production Service building, Muntinlupa
- Bonifacio Monument, Guillermo Tolentino, Caloocan, 1933
- Cine Concepcion, (Pablo Antonio), Malabon, 1940 (demolished)
- Clipper Hotel, Makati
- Gomez Mansions, Pasay
- Greendale Supermarket (Savemore), Marikina
- Guardhouse south of Petron station, C-5, Barangay Ugong, Pasig, (demolished)
- Hospital Español de Santiago, Makati, 1932 (demolished)
- Iglesia Ni Cristo chapel (Locale of F. Manalo), San Juan, 1952
- Iglesia ni Cristo Lokal ng Caloocan, Caloocan, 1953
- Iglesia ni Cristo Lokal ng Pasay, Pasay, 1954
- Iglesia ni Cristo Lokal ng Paco, Paco, Manila, 1957
- Lambingan Bridge, San Juan
- Manila Polo Club, (Pablo Antonio), Makati, 1950
- Manila Sanitarium, (Adventist Medical Center Manila), Pasay, 1929
- Mapúa Mansion, Pasay, 1930
- Morosi Theater, Pasay (demolished)
- Municipal Building, Makati
- Nielson Field Tower, Makati, 1937
- Santa Ana Racetrack, Makati (demolished)
- Savoy Bistro, Makati
- Syjuco Bel-air Apartments, Makati
- University of Makati Stadium, Makati
- Wack Wack Golf and Country Club, Mandaluyong, 1930
- White Cross Orphanage (Pablo Antonio), San Juan, 1938

=== Nueva Ecija ===
- Iglesia ni Cristo Lokal ng Cabanatuan, Cabanatuan, Nueva Ecija, 1957

=== Mindanao island ===
- Court of First Instance and City Jail, (demolished), Davao City
- Dakudao Building, Davao City
- Garcia Building, Davao City
- PNB building, Davao City
- Provincial Capitol, Cagayan de Oro
- PTA Stadium, Davao City

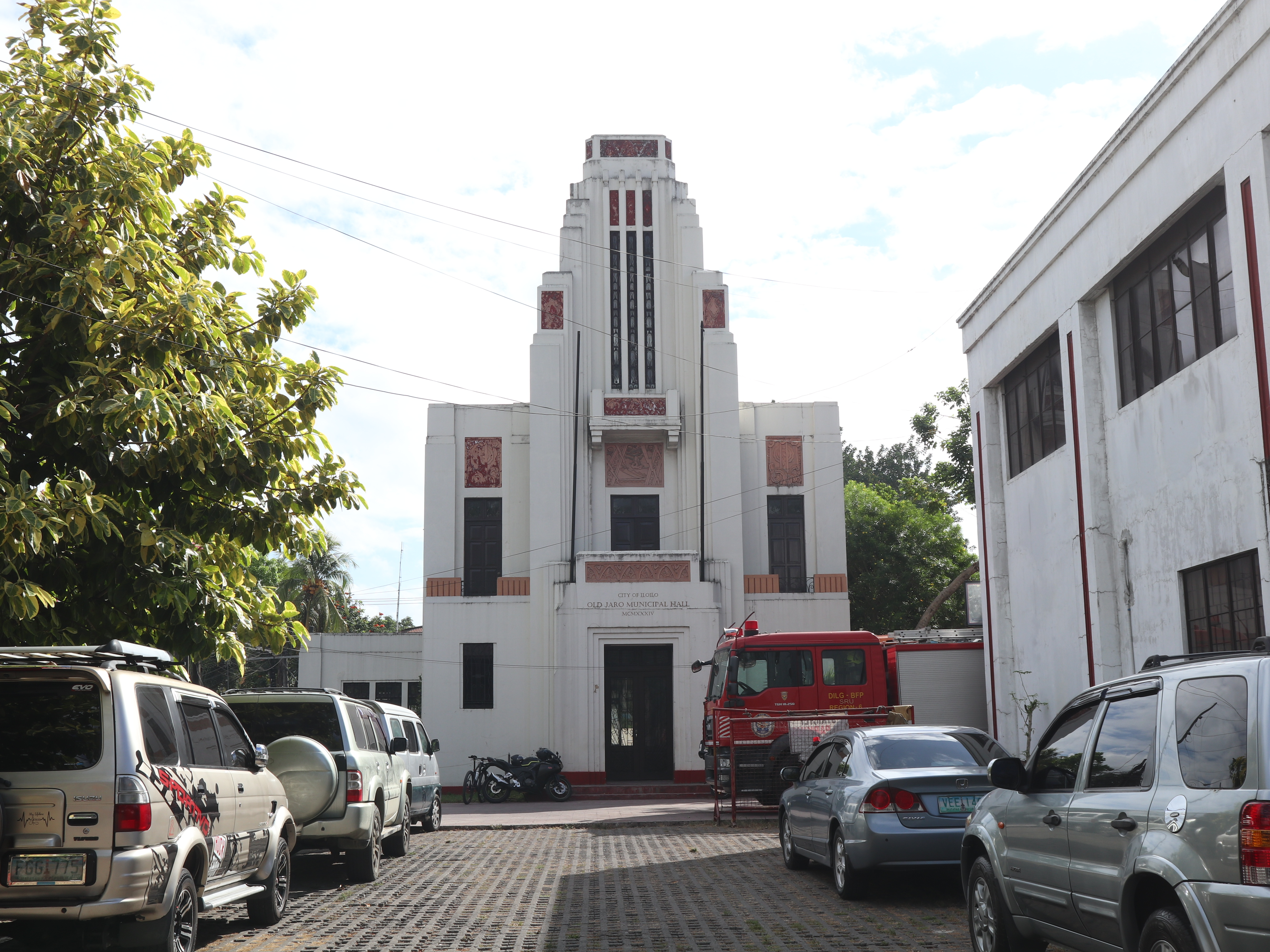
Old Municipal Hall, Jaro, Iloilo City, Philippines

=== Pampanga Province ===
- Pampanga Theater, San Fernando, 1939

=== Panay island ===
- Angelicum School Iloilo, Jaro, Iloilo City
- Banco Nacional de las Filipinas, Iloilo City
- Cementerio Catolico de Molo, Molo, Iloilo City
- Iloilo Central Market, Iloilo City
- Jaro Municipal Hall, (Juan M. Arellano), Jaro, Iloilo City, 1935
- Ledesma Mansion, Jaro, Iloilo City
- Lizares Mansion, Jaro, Iloilo City, 1937
- Lopez Boat House, (Fernando Ocampo) Jaro, Iloilo City, 1936
- Lopez Heritage House (Nelly's Gardens Mansion), Jaro, Iloilo City, 1928
- Pablo Dulalia Building, Iloilo City, 1932
- Philippine Tuberculosis Society Building, Iloilo City
- S. Villanueva Building, Iloilo City
- Salvador Building, Iloilo City
- YMCA, Iloilo City

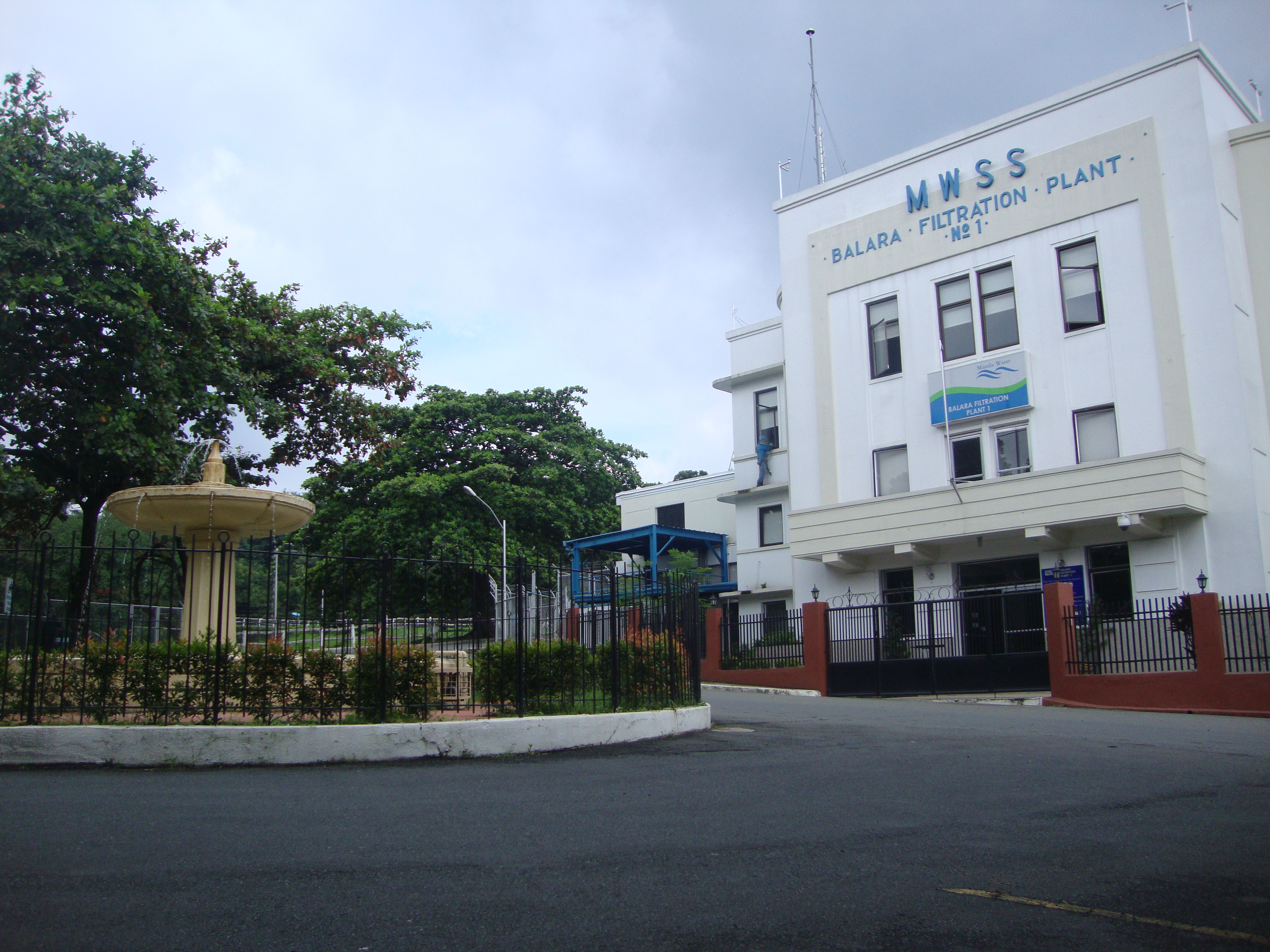
Balara Filtration Plant, Quezon City, Philippines

=== Quezon City ===
- 19 June Bridge, Quezon City
- AFP GHQ Building, Quezon City
- AFP Medical Center, Quezon City
- Balara Filters Plant, Quezon City
- Camp Aguinaldo guardhouses, Quezon City
- Christ the King Mission Seminary, Quezon City
- Manahan Building, Quezon City
- Medics Dormitory, Aurora Boulevard
- Mira-Nila House
- Mount Carmel Church, Quezon City
- National Cathedral of Saint Mary and Saint John, Quezon City
- National Children's Hospital, Quezon City (demolished)
- National Shrine of Our Lady of Lourdes, Quezon City
- Quezon City General Hospital, Quezon City
- Quezon Institute, (Juan Nakpil,), Quezon City, 1938
- Quezon Memorial Circle (Federico Ilustre), Quezon City, This is the tallest art-deco structure in the Philippines.
- Saint Joseph's College of Quezon City gateposts and fence, Quezon City
- Sacred Heart Parish Kamuning, Quezon City
- Santander Building, Quezon City
- Santo Domingo Church, (Jose Maria Zaragosa), Quezon City
- Siena College of Quezon City, Quezon City
- Standard Photo Engraving Co. building, Quezon City
- UERMMMC College of Medicine, Quezon City
- U.P. Quezon Hall (Juan Nakpil), Gonzales Hall (Nakpil), Palma Hall (Cesar Concio), Melchor Hall (Concio), Carillon Tower (Nakpil), Luna Parade Ground flagpole base, Molave Residence Hall, Quezon City
- Veterans Memorial Medical Center guardhouse, Quezon City
- Welcome Monument (Luciano V. Aquino), Quezon City, 1948

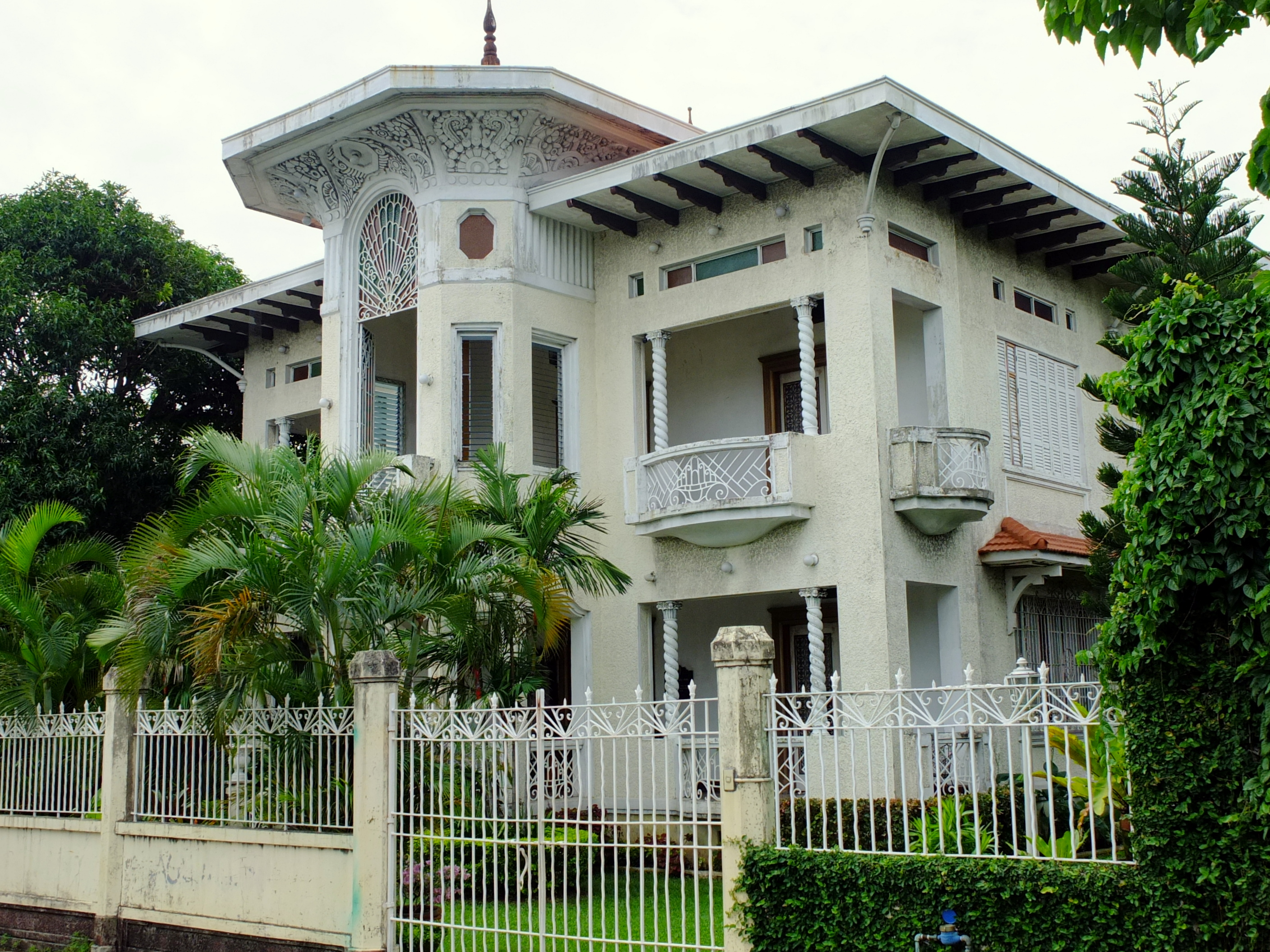
Gala-Rodriguez house, Sariaya, Quezon Province, Philippines

=== Quezon Province ===
- Gala-Rodriguez Ancestral House (Juan Nakpil), Sariaya, Quezon, 1935
- Municipal Hall, Tiaong, Quezon
- Natalio Enriquez House (Andres Luna de San Pedro), Sariaya, Quezon
- Quezon Provincial Capitol, (Juan M. Arellano), Lucena, Quezon, 1935
- Sariaya Municipal Building, (Juan M. Arellano), Sariaya, Quezon, 1931

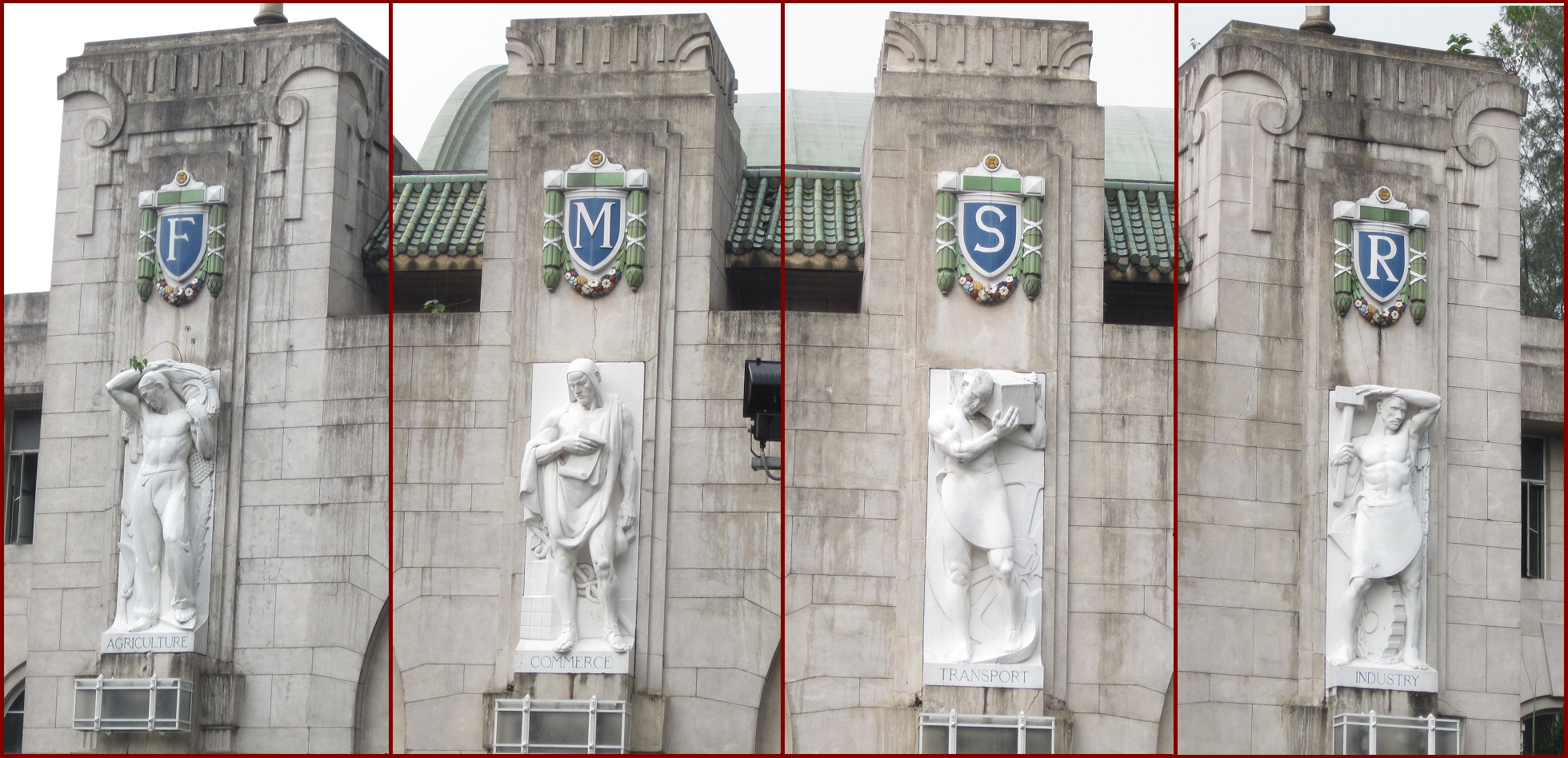
Tanjong Pagar railway station, Singapore

== Singapore ==
- 36 and 38 Armenian Street, Singapore
- Asia Insurance Building, Singapore, 1958
- Bank of China Building (Singapore), 1953
- Capitol Theatre, Singapore, 1930
- Clifford Pier, Collier Quay, Singapore, 1933
- former Ford Factory, Bukit Timah, Singapore, 1942
- Kallang Airport, Singapore, 1937
- Majestic Theatre (formerly the Tien Yien Moh Toi Theatre), Chinatown, 1938
- Murray Terrace, Singapore, 1929
- Parkview Square, 2002
- Rex Cinemas Mackenzie, 1964
- Tanjong Pagar railway station, Tanjong Pagar, 1932
- The Cathay, Singapore, 1937
- The Great Madras, Little India, Singapore
- Tiong Bahru housing estate, Bukit Merah Planning Area, 1920s

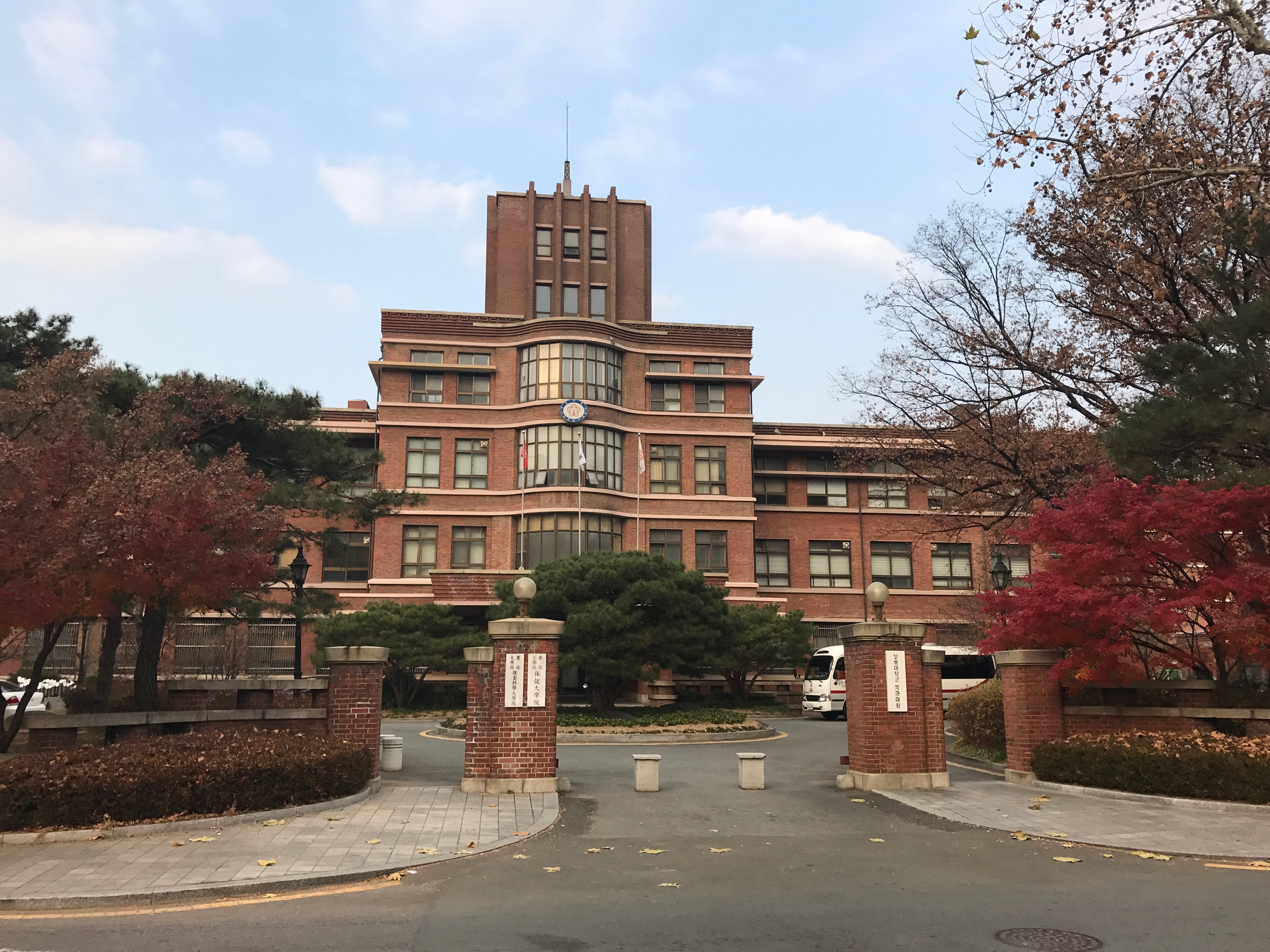
Graduate School of Medicine, Kyungpook National University (KNU), Daegu, South Korea

== South Korea ==
- former Busan Meteorological Observatory, Busan, 1934
- Central Temple of Cheondogyo, Seoul, 1921
- Chonnam Girls' High School, Gwangju, 1927
- former City Hall, Seoul, 1925
- Graduate School of Medicine (formerly Daegu Medical College), Kyungpook National University, Daegu, 1933
- Gyeonggi Commercial High school, Seoul, 1923
- former Ilseon Shipping Office, Incheon, 1930s
- Kyungpook National University Hospital (the former Provincial Daegu Hospital, Daegu, 1928,
- Myeongdong Theater, Seoul, 1936
- Seoul Metropolitan Council building, Seoul, 1925
- Seoseok Elementary School and Gymnasium, Gungwon-do, Hongcheon-gun Seosok-myeon, 1935

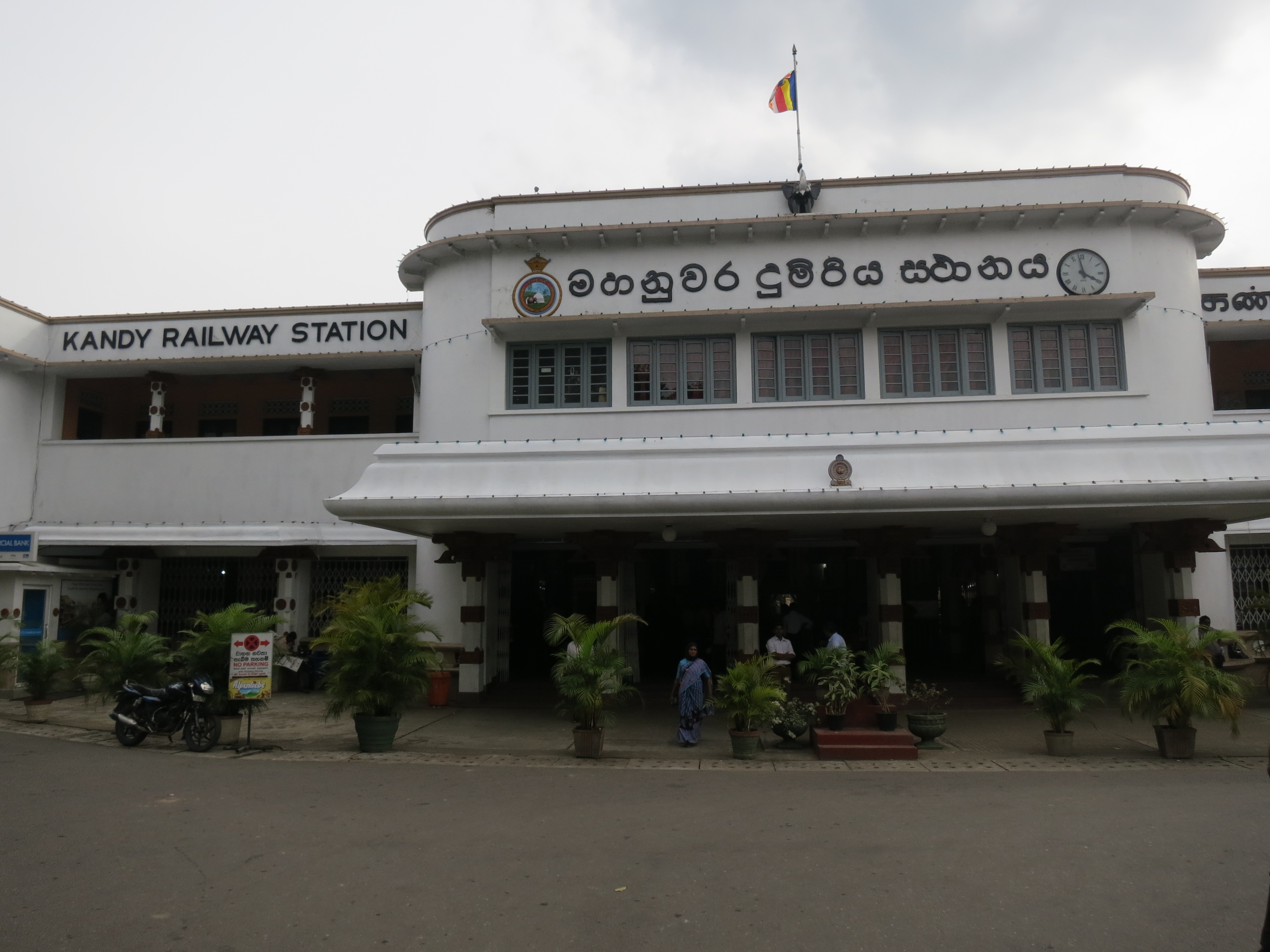
Kandy Railway Station, Kandy, Sri Lanka

== Sri Lanka ==
- Deco on 44 Hotel, Lighthouse Street, Galle, 1930s
- Galle Face Court, Galle Road, Colombo, 1930s
- Imperial Theatre, Kurunegala
- Kandy Railway Station, Kandy
- Walker Sons and Company Building, Layden Bastian Road, Colombo
- YMCA, Bristol Street, Colombo

== Thailand ==
- Laung Sitra Tapakarn's residence, Ratchaburi
- New Chalerm Uthai Theater, Uthai Thani, early 1940s
- O.K. Rama, Suphanburi
- Phra Ram Ratchaniwet (Ban Puen Palace for King Chulalongkorn), Petchaburi, 1916
- St. Josef Church, Ban Pong, Ratchaburi
- Thahan Bok Theater, Lopburi, 1941
- Wik Kru Thawee Theatre, Ratchaburi, 1958

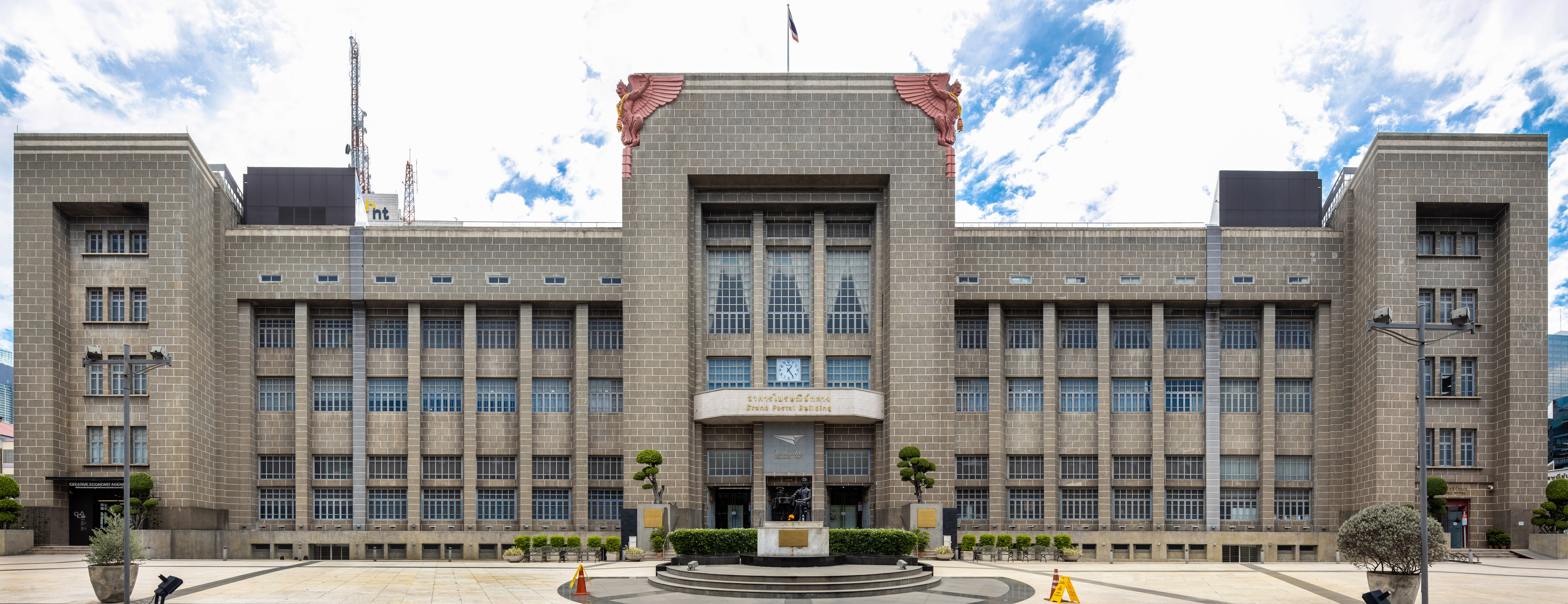
Bangkok General Post Office, Bang Rak, Bangkok, Thailand

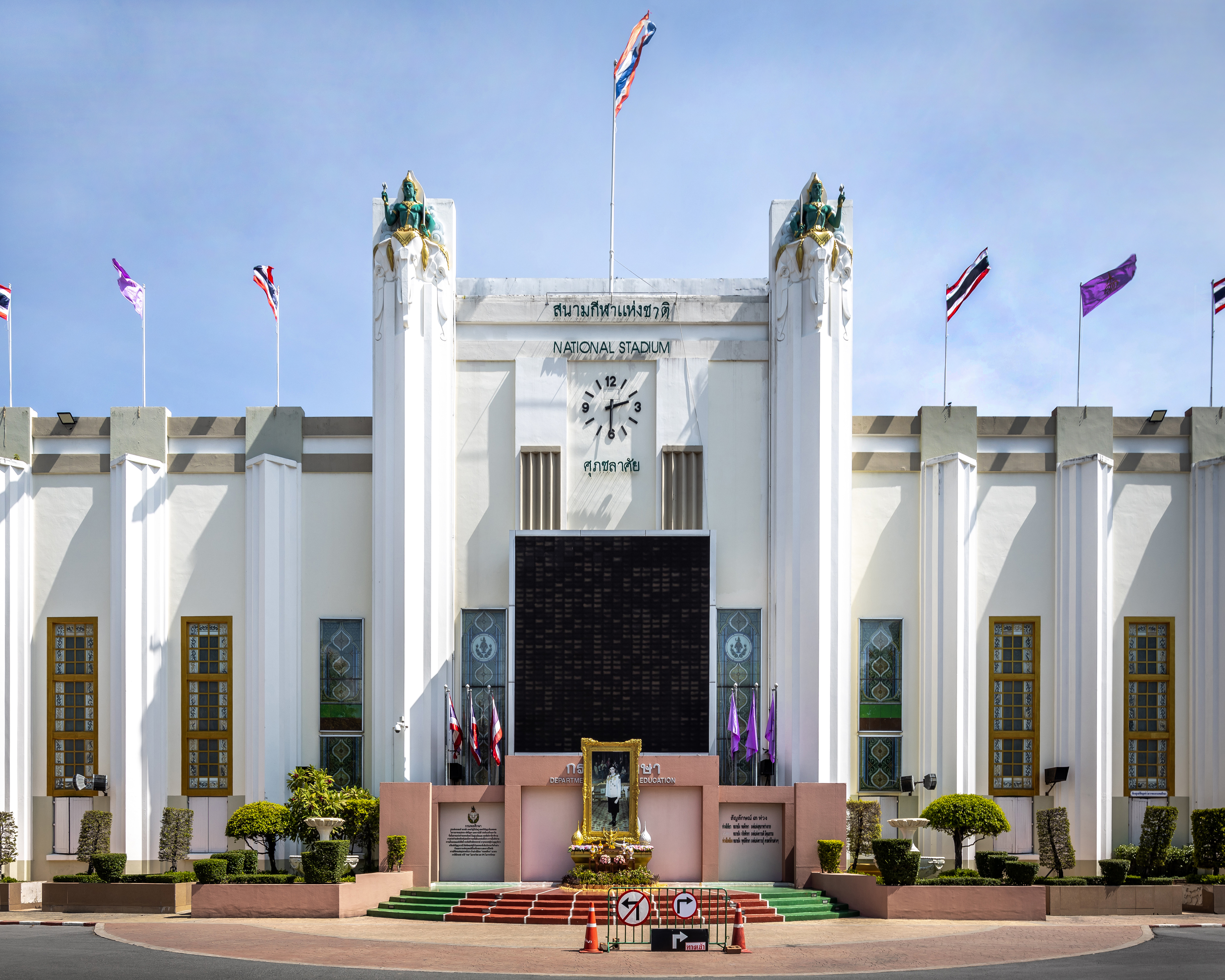
Suphachalasai Stadium or National Stadium

=== Bangkok ===
- Bangkok Railway Station (Hua Lamphong Station), Pathum Wan District, Bangkok, 1916
- Democracy Monument, Bangkok, 1939
- General Post Office, Bangkok, 1940
- National Stadium, Pathum Wan District, Bangkok, 1937
- Rajadamnern Stadium (Sanam Muay Rajadamnern boxing stadium), Bangkok, 1945
- Rama I Road Yotse bridge-Kasat Suek bridge, Bangkok, 1929
- The Royal Hotel
- Sala Chalermkrung Royal Theatre, Bangkok, 1933
- Thon Buri Railway station, Bangkok Noi District, Bangkok, 1950
- Victory Monument, Ratchathewi District, 1942
- The 1940s-era buildings along the middle section of Ratchadamnoen (Kingswalk) Avenue
- Scala Cinema, Bangkok, 1969

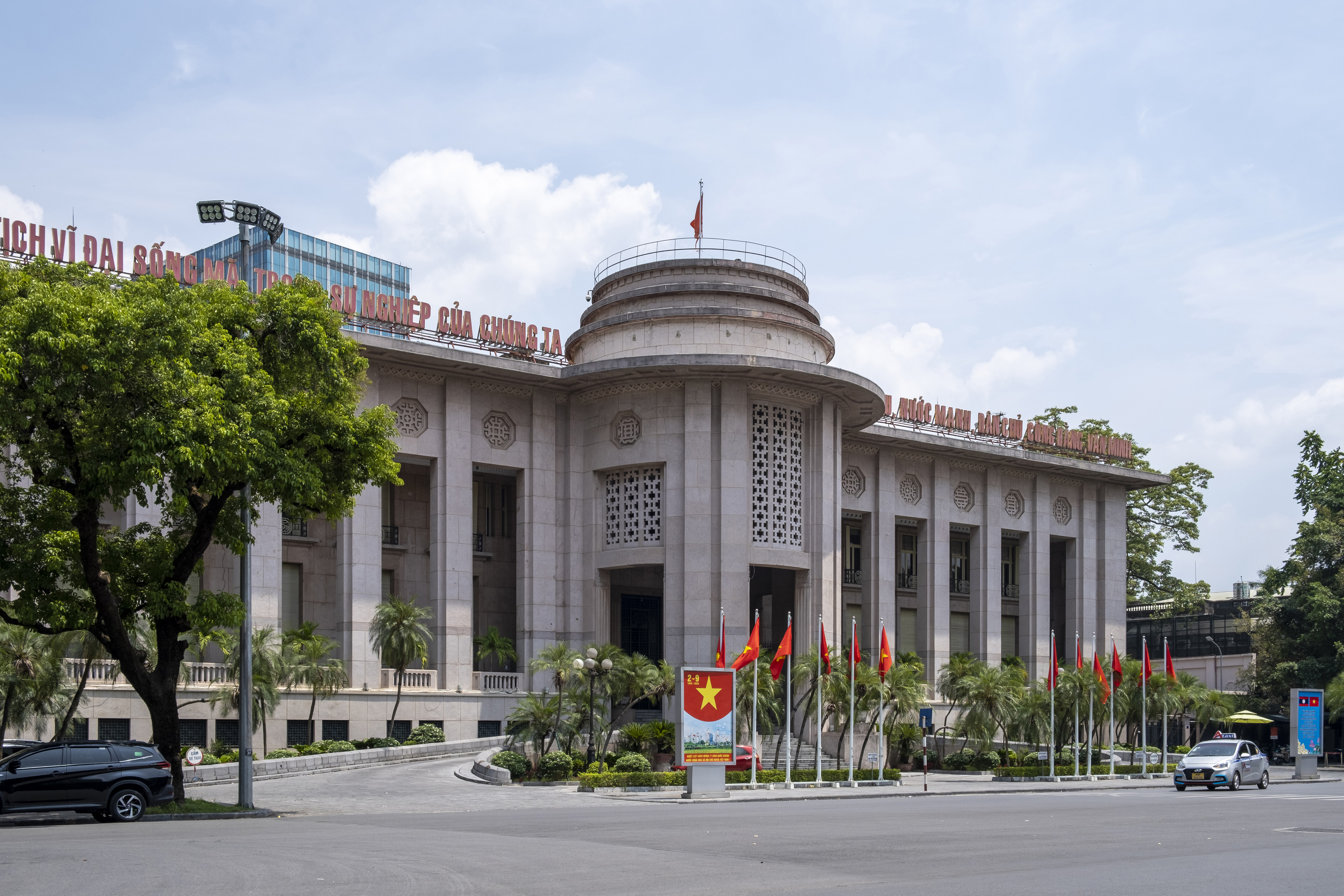
Banque de l'Indochine (now State Bank of Vietnam), Hanoi, Vietnam

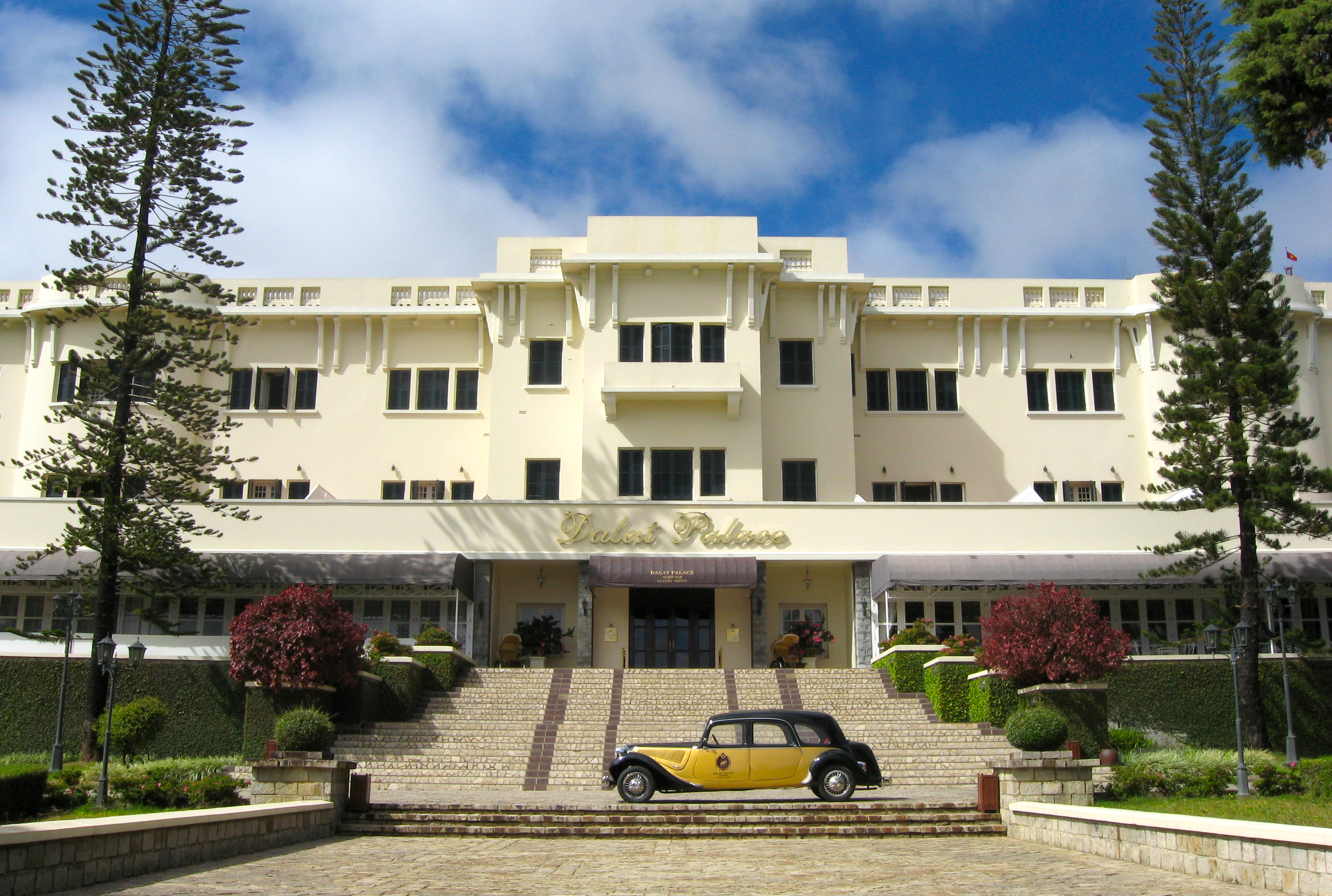
Dalat Palace Hotel, Da Lat, Vietnam

== Vietnam ==
- Bach Mai Hospital (formerly René Robin Hospital), Hanoi, 1940
- Banque de l'Indochine (now State Bank of Vietnam), Hanoi, 1930s
- Clinique Building (former hospital), French Quarter, Hanoi, 1920s
- Cửa Bắc Church, Hanoi, 1925, 1932
- Da Lat Palace Hotel, Da Lat, 1922
- Da Lat Railway Station, Da Lat, 1932, 1938
- Domaine de Marie Catholic convent, Da Lat, 1940
- Emperor Bao Dai's Summer Palace, Da Lat
- Ho Chi Minh City Museum of Fine Arts, Ho Chi Minh, 1934
- Hotel de l'Opera Hanoi, Hanoi
- IDEO printing house, Hanoi
- Ministry of Foreign Affairs, Hanoi, 1945
- State Bank of Vietnam, Hanoi

== See also ==
- List of Art Deco architecture
- Art Deco topics
- Streamline Moderne architecture
