= Fernando Ocampo =

Filipino architect and civil engineer

Ar. Fernando H. Ocampo, Sr., FPIA, PICE
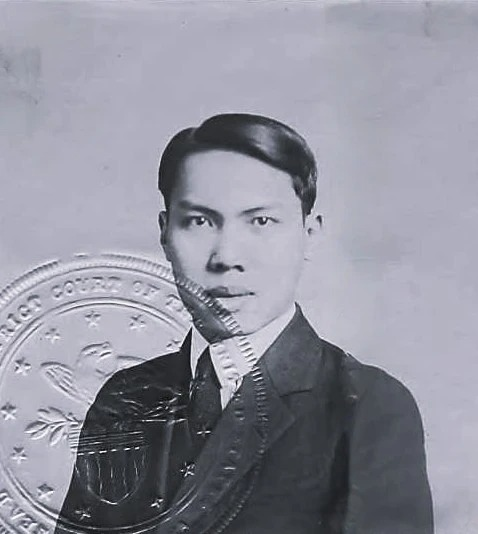
- Ocampo's U.S. passport application picture, 1921
- Born: Fernando Hizon Ocampo; August 7, 1897; San Fernando, Pampanga, Captaincy General of the Philippines
- Died: 1984 (aged 86–87); Manila, Philippines
- Resting place: La Loma Cemetery
- Education: Ateneo de Manila University; University of Pennsylvania; University of Santo Tomas
- Occupations: Architect, Civil Engineer, Architectural Professorial Lecturer
- Spouse: Lourdes Magdangal Luciano-Ocampo
- Children: 4 (including Edgardo Ocampo)

Fernando Hizon Ocampo, Sr. (August 7, 1897 – 1984) was a Filipino architect and civil engineer.

== Biography ==
Fernando Hizon Ocampo, Sr., A.B., B.S.C.E., B.S. Arch., was born on August 7, 1897, in San Fernando, Pampanga, at the historic Hizon–Ocampo House he was the son of Dr. Basilio Ocampo a gobernadorcillo of San Fernando Pampanga and Leoncia Hizon-Ocampo. One of Manila's renowned architects and Civil Engineer. Ocampo was educated at the ADMU A.B., in 1914; UST College of Engineering, B.S. in Civil Engineering, 1919; and University of Pennsylvania, B.S. in Architecture, 1921. Following his graduation from the University of Pennsylvania, he worked in the Ballinger & Perrot Architects+Engineers office of Ar. Emile G. Perrot, AIA, ASCE and Ar. Walter F. Ballinger an architect and engineer in Philadelphia, Pennsylvania, and then spent two years traveling in Europe, giving particular attention to architectural designs. Returning to Manila he was for four years an assistant architect in the Bureau of Public Works. In 1927 he became associated with architect Tomas Arguelles and established Arguelles & Ocampo Architects.

Many of Manila's finest business buildings and residences attest to Ocampo's ability as an architect and engineer. Among these are the Manila Cathedral; UST Central Seminary; the Arguelles, Paterno Building FEATI University at carriedo corner McArthur Bridge, Sta. Cruz, Manila, Ayala, G.A. CuUnjieng Building build in 1935 (demolished in September 1945 during liberation of manila) present site of Fernandez Building of LBC Escolta Branch in front of Natividad (Hamilton Brown/Phil. Education Co.) Building at no. 415 Escolta cor. T. Pinpin Streets, binondo, manila in 1929; Regina Building at Escolta street, binondo, manila in 1915 with design and structural collaboration with Ar. Andres P. Luna; and Fernandez buildings; the Assumption Academy of Pampanga, the North Syquia and Admiral Apartments (demolished 2014 during Mayor Joseph E. Estrada Administration) in Malate, and the residence of Mr. Joaquin Baltazar, the latter having taken the first prize in the 1930 beautiful home contest. He also designed the Calvo Building at Escolta cor. Soda Streets., Manila in 1938 and the Eugenio Lopez, Sr. "Boat House" at Iloilo City in 1936.

In 1929 and 1930 Ocampo was a member of the Board of Examiners for Architects in Manila, co-founded Philippine Institute of Architecture (PIA) together Ar. Juan M. Arellano & Ar. Andres P. Luna and in addition to his private practice he became a member of the faculty of the School of Architecture at the University of Santo Tomas, Manila.

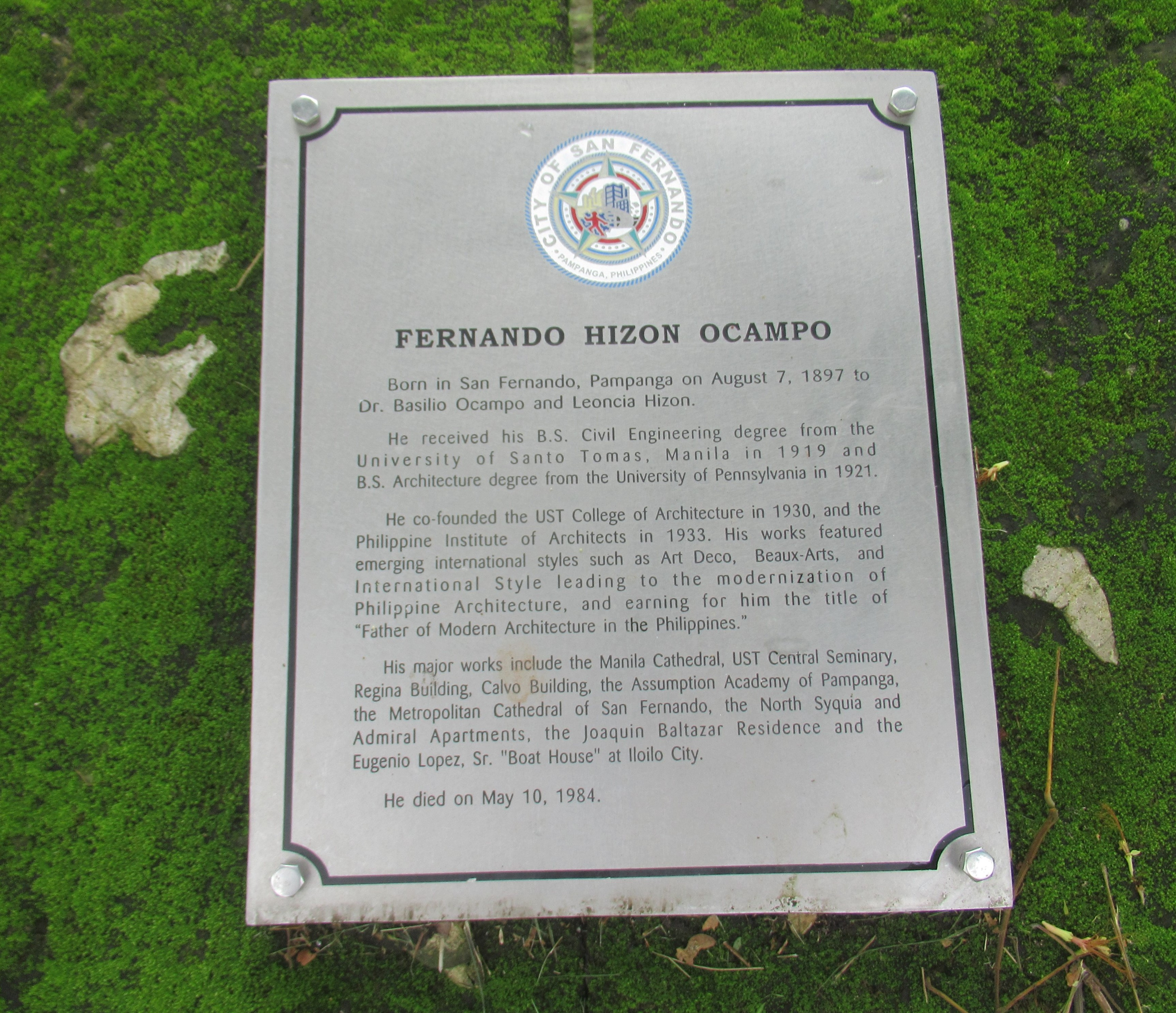
San Fernando, Pampanga historical marker

== Personal life ==
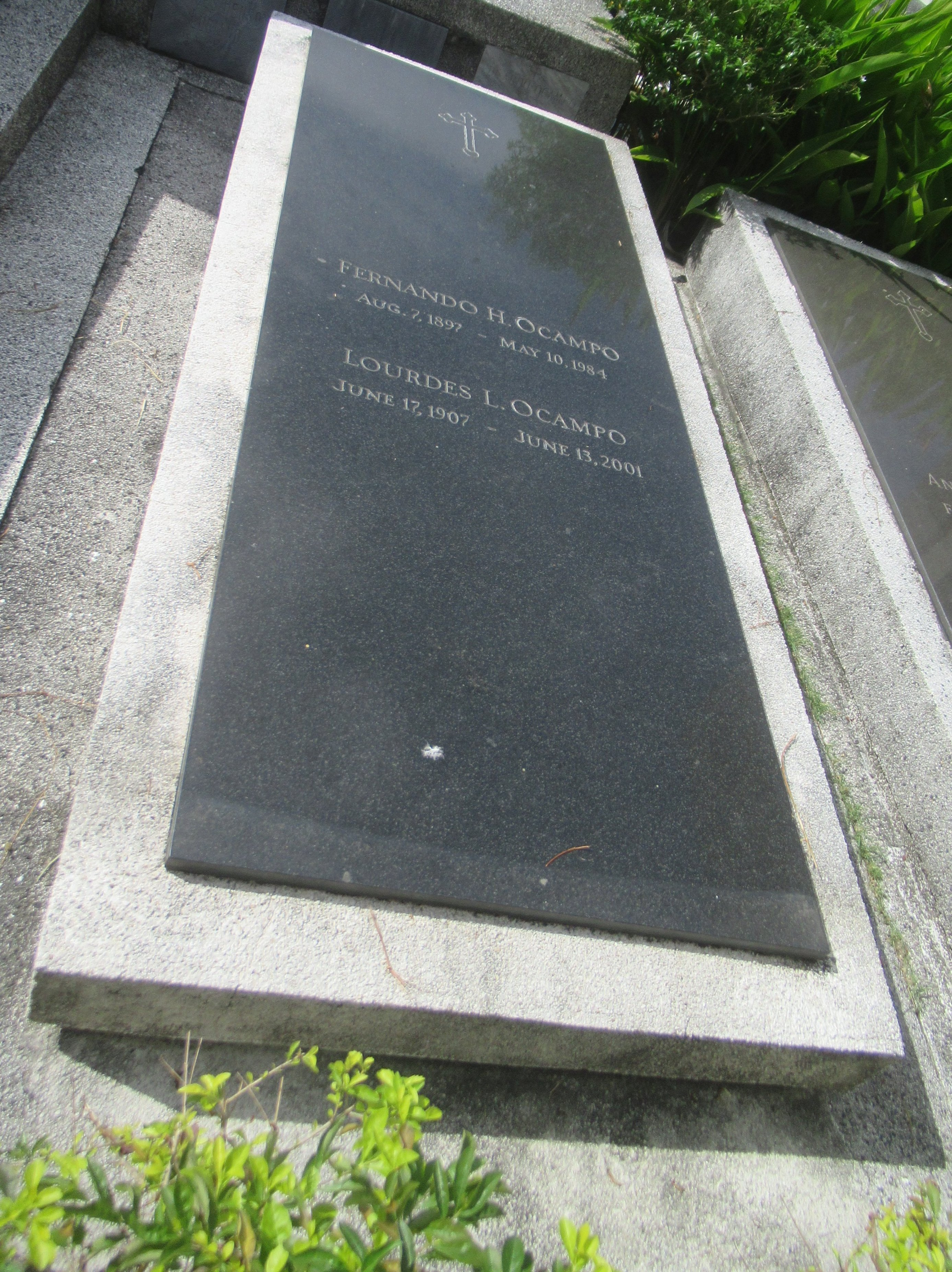
Fernando Hizon Ocampo, Sr.'s grave at La Loma Cemetery.

One of Ocampo's children was renowned basketball player and coach Ed Ocampo (1938-1992) and architect Fernando L. Ocampo, Jr., UAP.

== Death ==
He died in 1984 in Manila, Philippines due to a lingering illness.
