= Regina Building =

Historic building in Binondo, Manila, Philippines

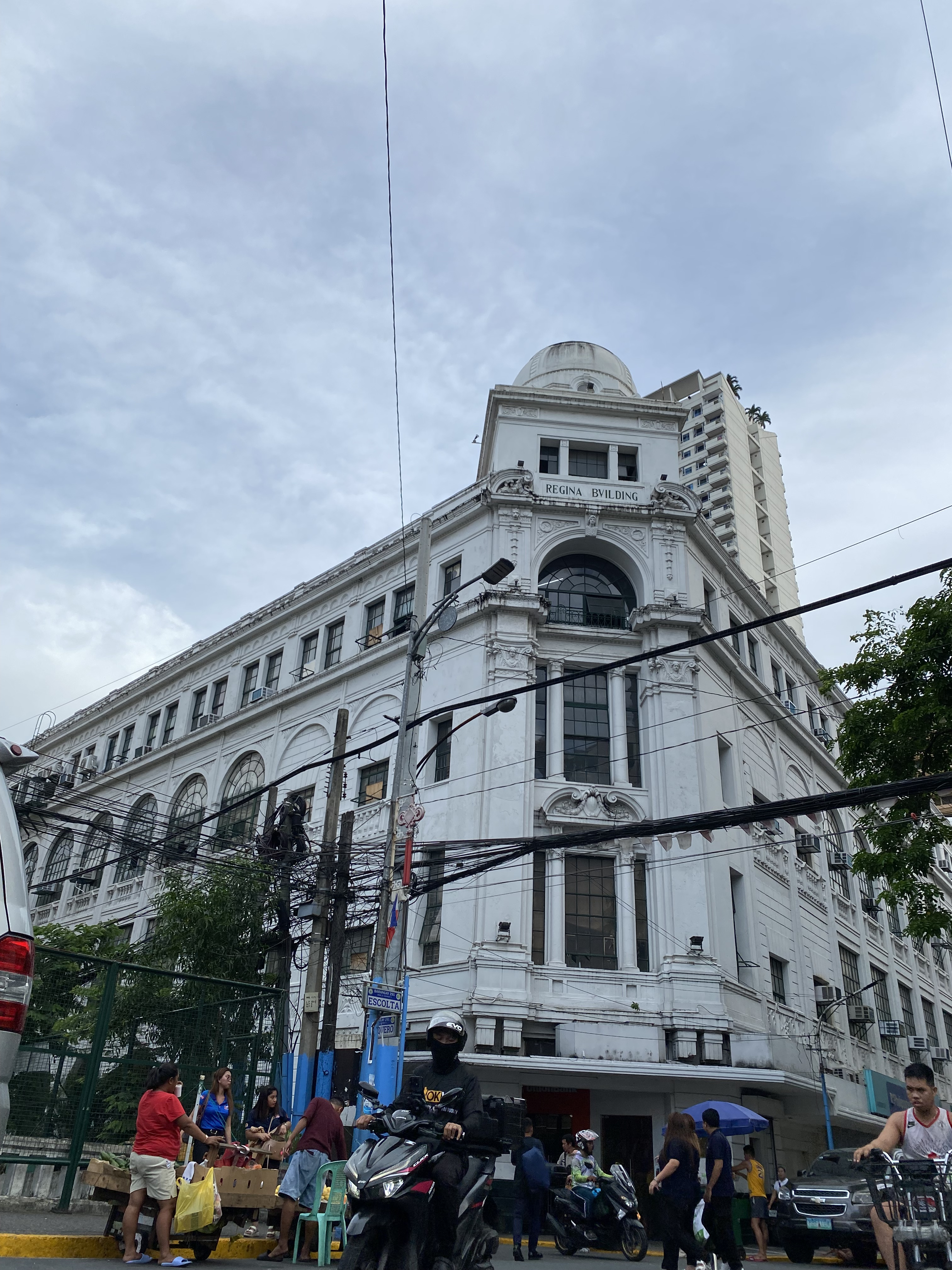
- Façade of Regina Building in 2025
- Interactive map of the Regina Building area

General information
- Architectural style: Neoclassical Beaux-arts architecture
- Location: 420 Escolta Street Corner Burke Street, Binondo, Manila, Philippines
- Coordinates: 14.5985°N 120.9795°E
- Completed: 1915

Design and construction
- Architects: Andrés Luna de San Pedro and Fernando H. Ocampo, Sr.

Regina Building, previously known as Roxas Building, is a historic building located along Escolta Street in Binondo, Manila, Philippines. It was designed sequentially by Andrés Luna de San Pedro and Fernando H. Ocampo. The neoclassical beaux-arts commercial structure was built in 1915.

== History ==
Regina Building, originally known as Roxas Building was designed by Andres Luna de San Pedro, son of Juan Luna and was built in 1915 at the corner of Escolta Street and Calle David in Binondo, Manila. The design combined the styles of neoclassicism and beaux-arts. It was a three-storey structure during the time it was built but was later expanded into a fourth floor by Fernando Ocampo when the De Leon family bought if from the Roxases. The building was renamed Regina Building in 1926.

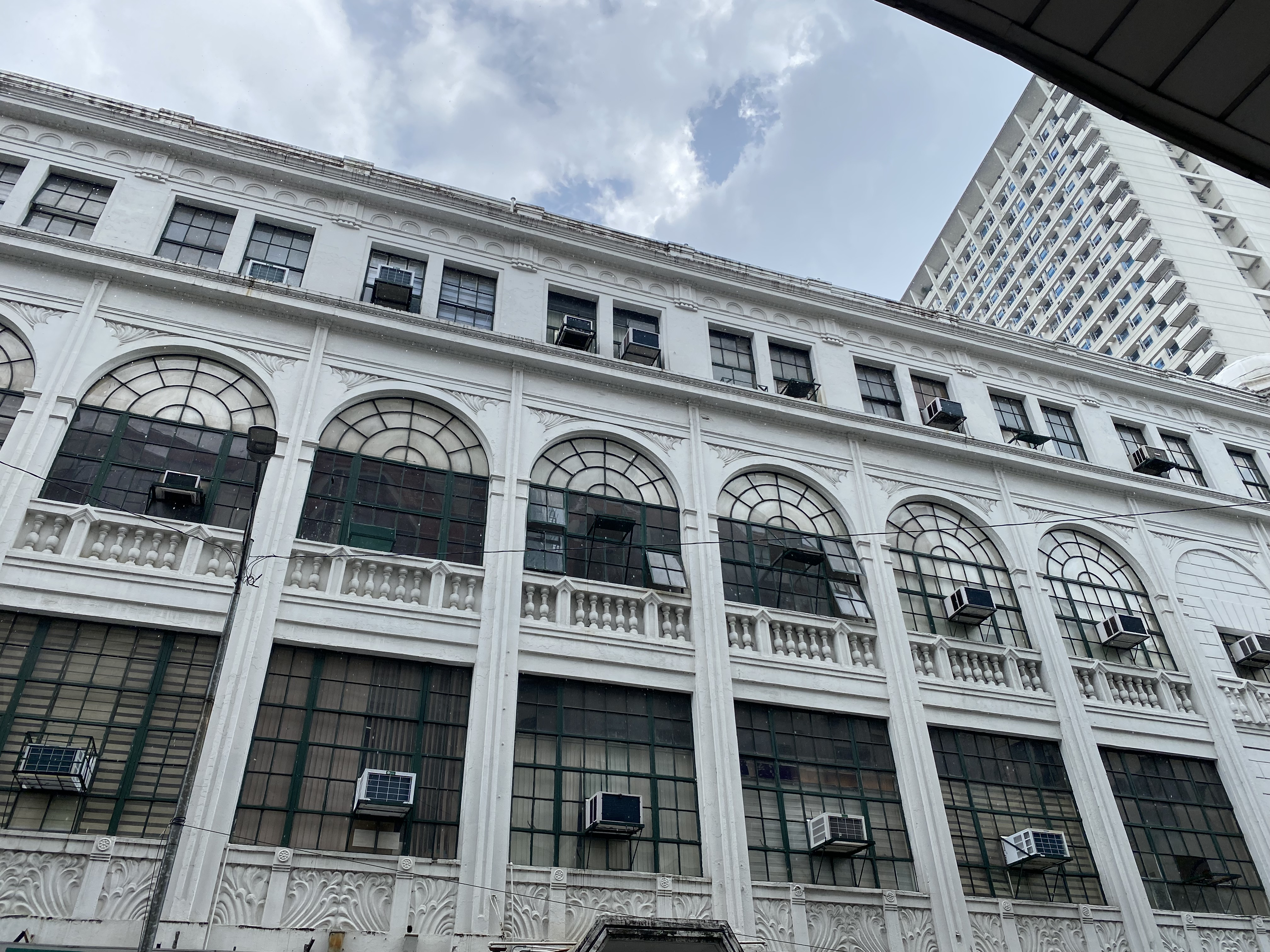
Façade along Escolta Street

This building is surrounded on its two sides by two bodies of water, Estero de la Reina and the Pasig River.

Madrigal Steamship company owned by the former senator Vicente Madrigal had its main office in the building. The senator also rented a room here for his staff. Many insurance companies also occupied the structure during its heyday including one of the first Filipino-owned insurance companies (now is Spanish-owned Mapfre Insular Insurance), the Provident Insurance Corporation in 1934. The building now houses several freight forwarding companies.
