= Calvo Building =

Historic building in Manila, Philippines

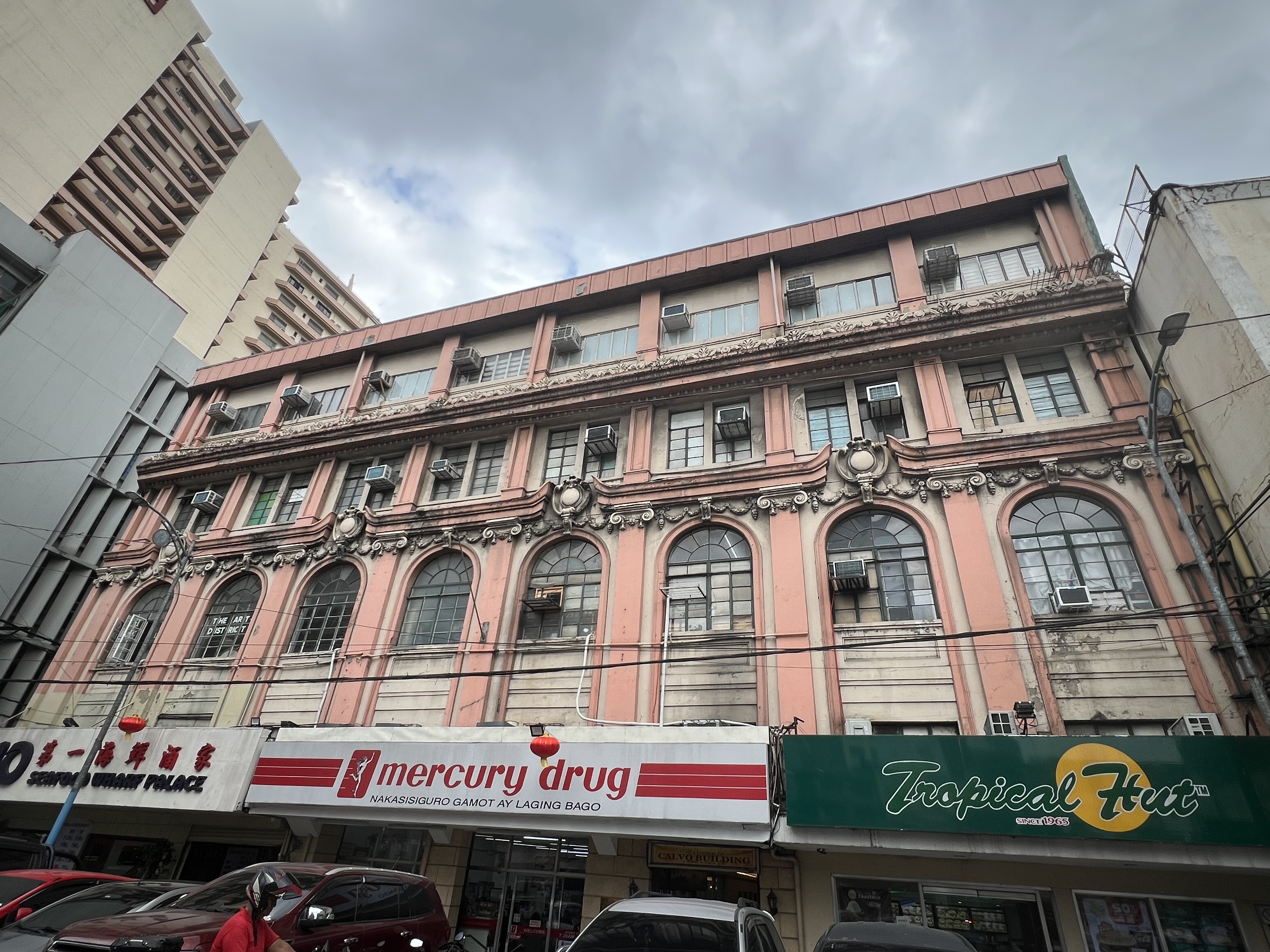
- Interactive map of the Calvo Building area

General information
- Architectural style: Beaux-Arts architecture
- Coordinates: 14°35′50″N 120°58′42″E
- Groundbreaking: 1938
- Opened: August 14, 1938; 87 years ago
- Owner: Angel Calvo

Design and construction
- Architect: Fernando Ocampo, Sr.
- Architecture firm: Arguille & Ocampo Architects

The Calvo Building is a historic building along no. 266 Escolta corner Soda Streets, Binondo, Manila, Philippines. Built in 1938, owned by Doña Emiliana Mortera vda. De Calvo and Angel Calvo, it is an outstanding mix of Beaux-Arts and Neoclassical architecture, designed by Fernando H. Ocampo.

Being in one of Manila's business districts, it served as the home of many businesses and establishments. It was the home of radio station Robert La Rue "Uncle Bob" Stewart's Republic Broadcasting System, a precursor of DZBB-AM and GMA Network.

Other businesses that occupied the building are as follows:

- Philippine Bank of Commerce
- Sabater Optical
- Luisa & Sons, a pre-war soda fountain house
- Aquino & Lichauco Attorneys-at-Law
- Araneta & Company
- MARECO Recording Studio
- LR Villar Music Store
- Sorriente-Santos retail department store chain- originator of the "Buy-one, Take-one"
- Torino Restaurant
- Peacock Garden
- Syyap's Inc.
- Botica de Sta. Cruz
- Esso & Company Inc.
- The Idol Shop
- Wah Yuen Hotpot & Seafood Restaurant
- Filipino Theatrical Enterprises

During the Japanese occupation, it was used by the Japanese Imperial forces. It was damaged in the Liberation of Manila in 1945, and was restored in 1946.

Today it houses UNO Restaurant, Mercury Drug Store, Tropical Hut and the Escolta Commercial Association. It also contains one of the country's oldest brass-cage Otis elevators. It is also known to be the only building in prewar Escolta to be recessed from the street, as it was a Tranvia flagstop.

It now houses the Calvo Building Museum which contains memorabilia from the country's specially Manila's prewar commerce and industry, early theater and entertainment, early printing and ephemera, artifacts from the Manila Carnival and other vestiges of the city's storied past.

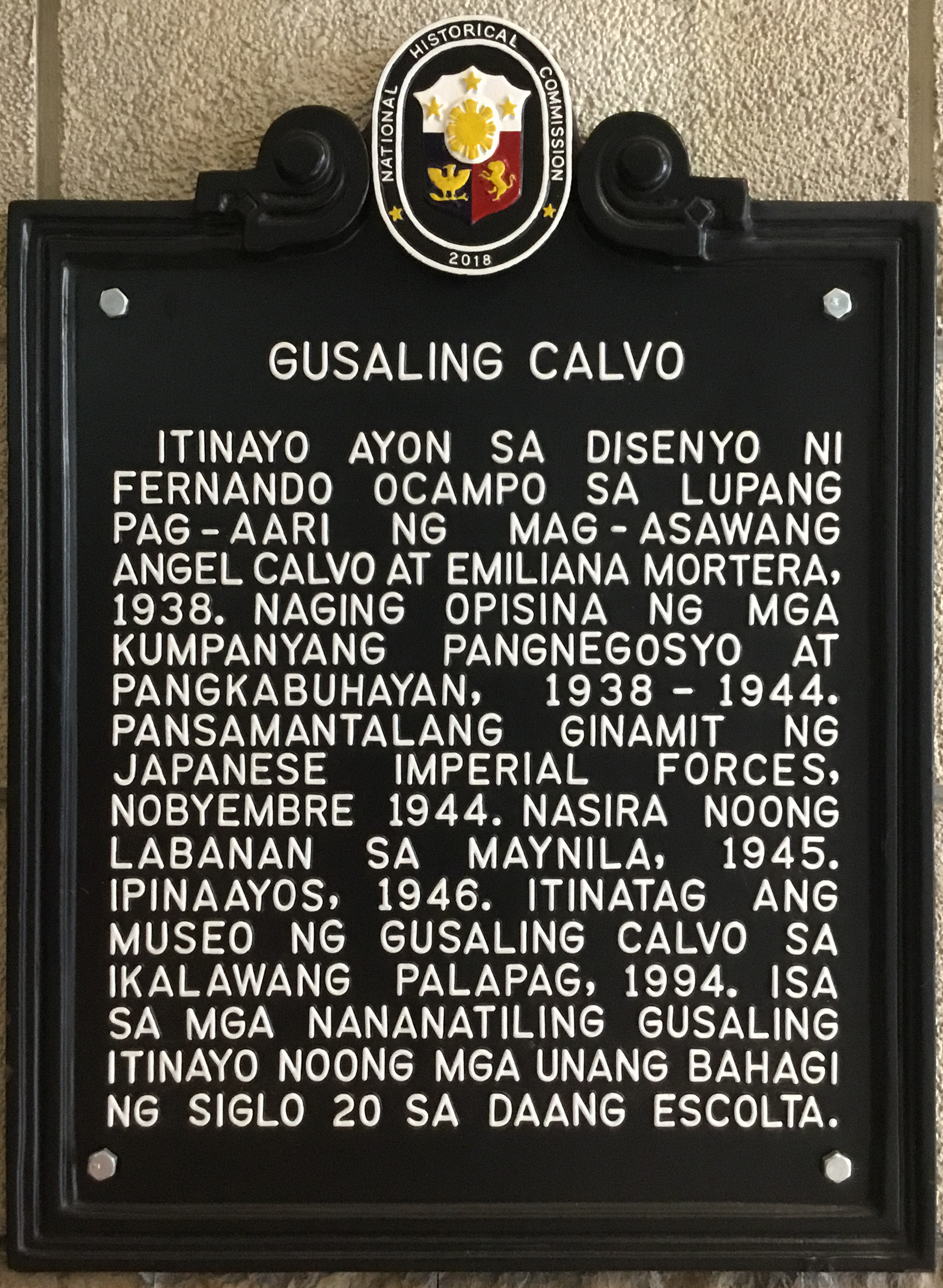
Historical marker by the NHCP

A historical marker was installed by the National Historical Commission of the Philippines on August 14, 2018.

Original Filipino Text	Translated English Text
ITINAYO AYON SA DISENYO NI FERNANDO OCAMPO SA LUPANG PAG-AARI NG MAG-ASAWANG ANGEL CALVO AT EMILIANA MORTERA, 1938. NAGING OPISINA NG MGA KUMPANYANG PANGNEGOSYO AT PANGKABUHAYAN, 1938 - 1944. PANSAMANATALANG GINAMIT NG JAPANESE IMPERIAL FORCES, NOBYEMBRE 1944. NASIRA NOONG LABANAN SA MAYNILA, 1945. IPINAAYOS, 1946. ITINATAG ANG MUSEO NG GUSALING CALVO SA IKALAWANG PALAPAG, 1994. ISA SA MGA NANANATILING GUSALING ITINAYO NOONG MGA UNANG BAHAGI NG SIGLO 20 SA DAANG ESCOLTA.	Built under the designs of Fernando Ocampo on the land owned by the couple Angel Calvo and Emiliana Mortera, 1938. Became offices of commercial companies, 1938 - 1944. Temporarily used by Japanese Imperial Forces, November 1944. Destroyed during the Battle of Manila, 1945. Restored, 1946 Calvo Building Museum was established on its second floor, 1994. One of the remaining buildings from the earlier part of the 20th century along Escolta Street.

== Details ==
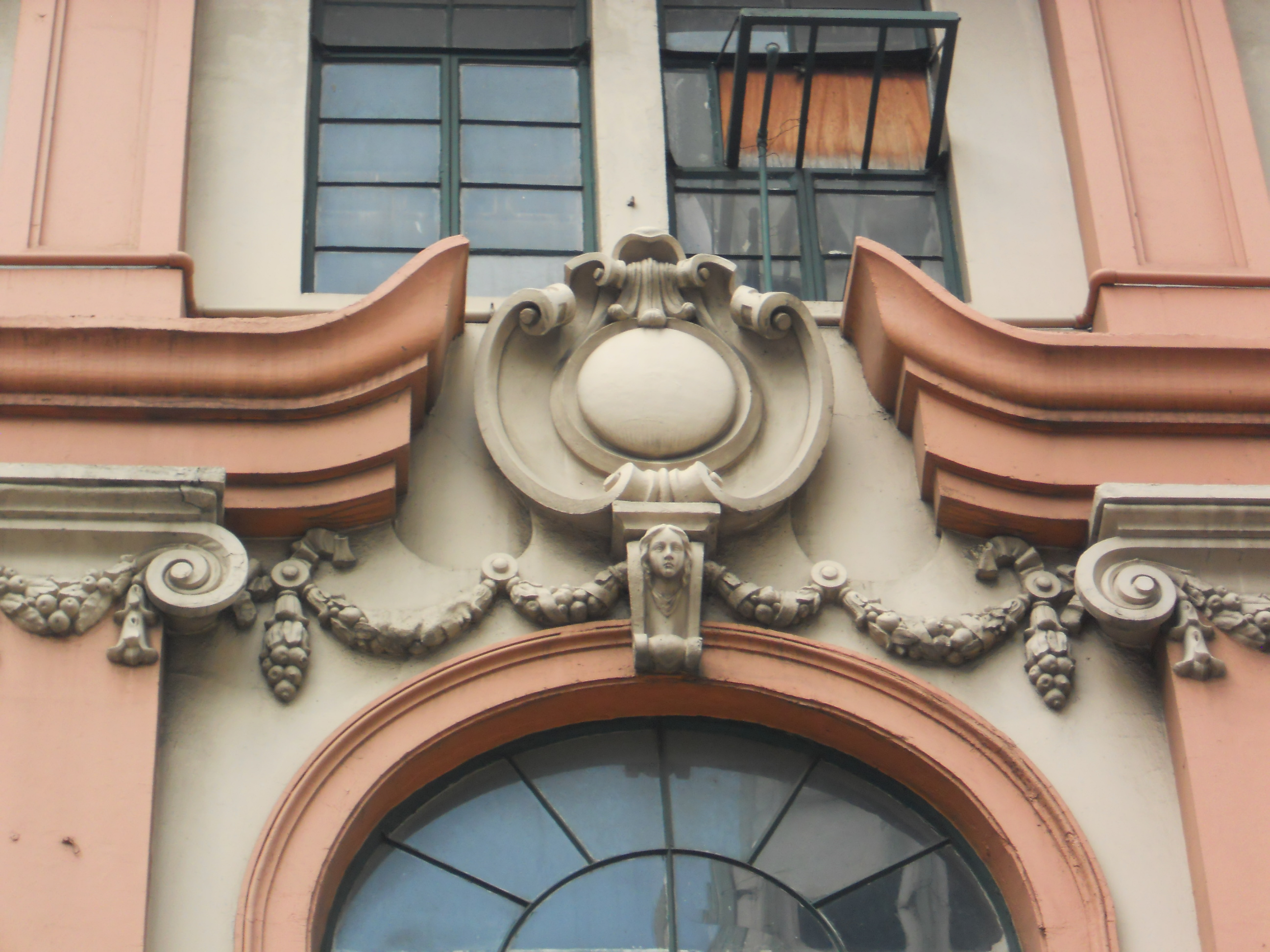
The building's architectural details

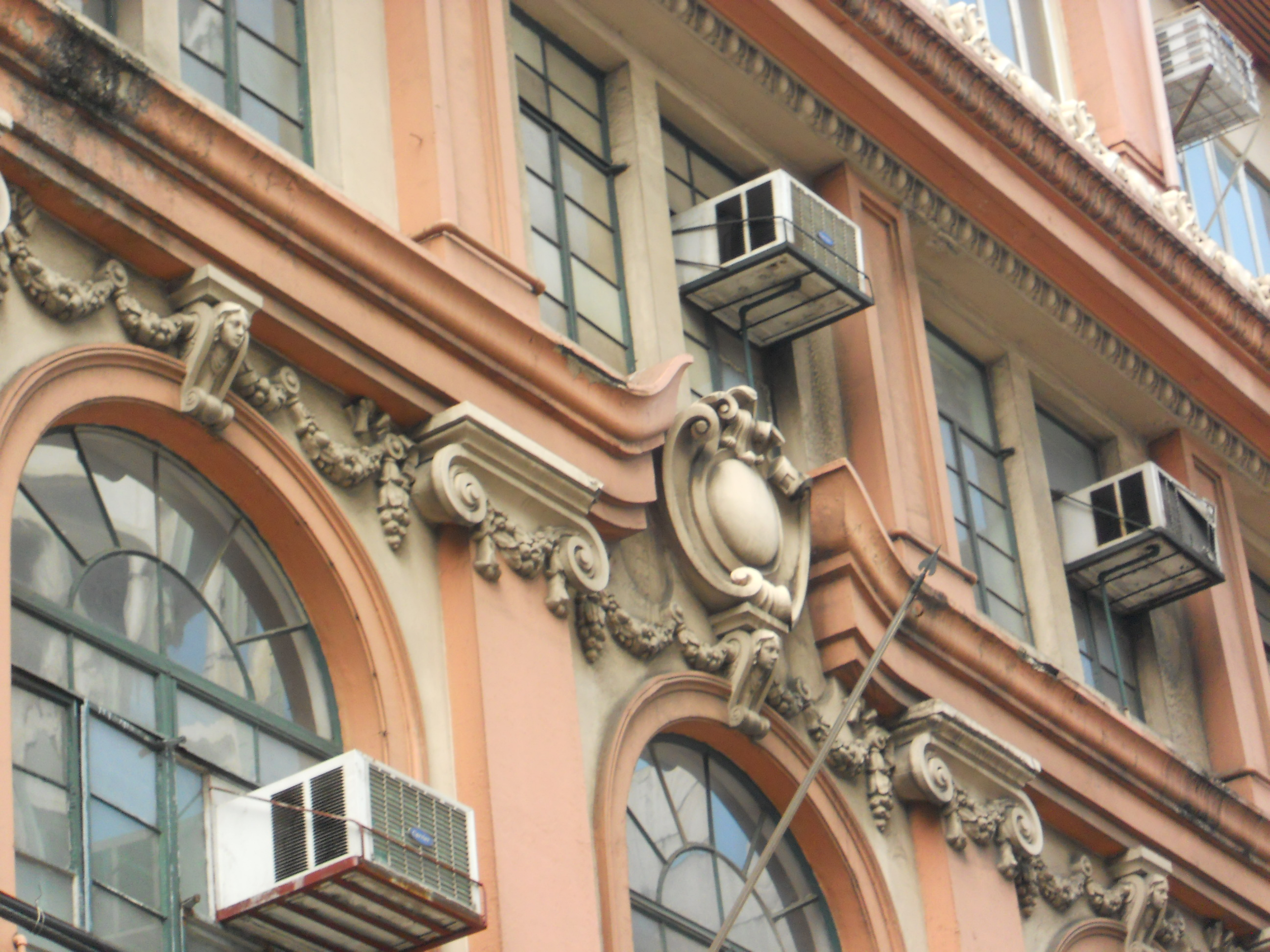

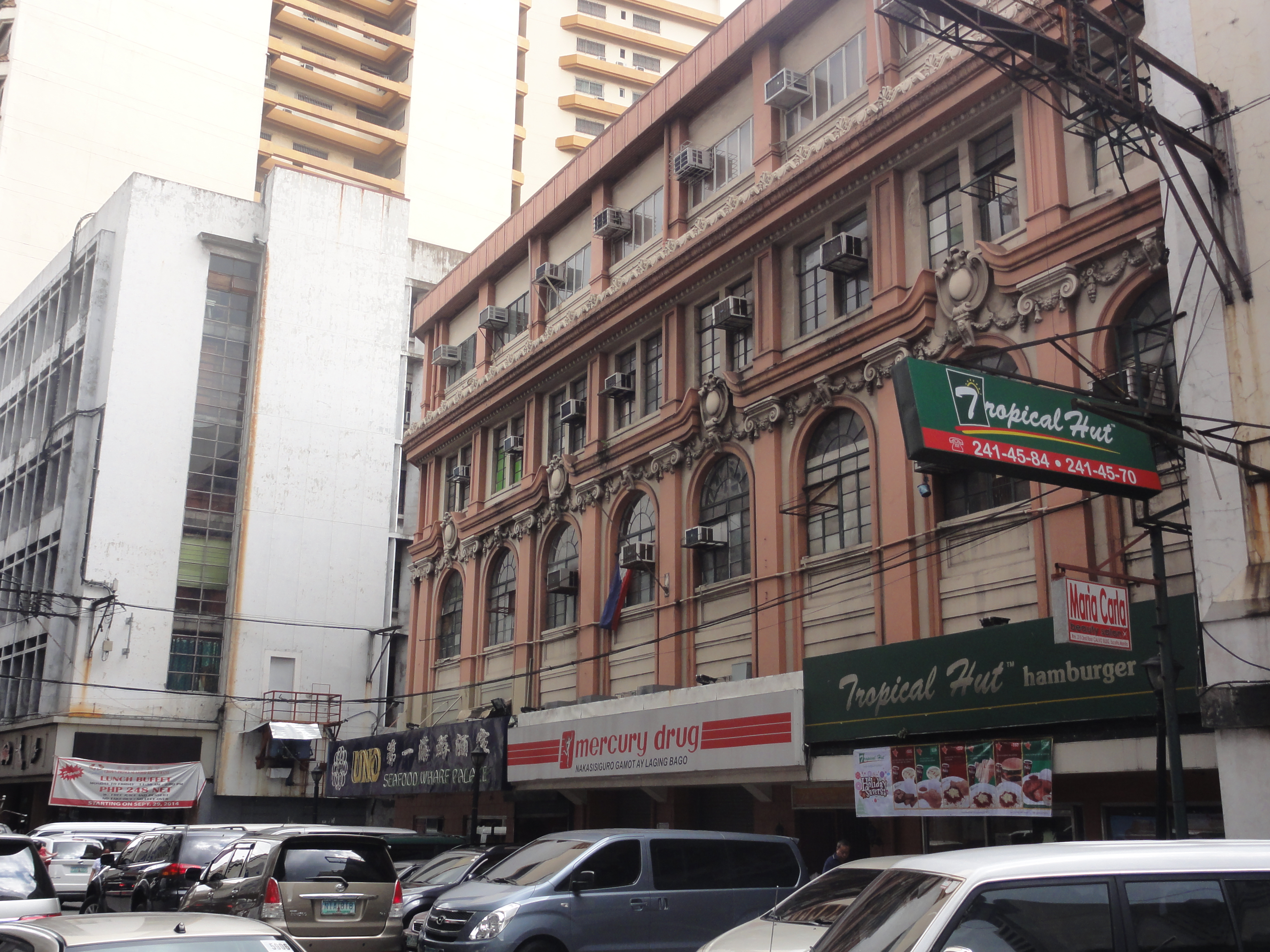

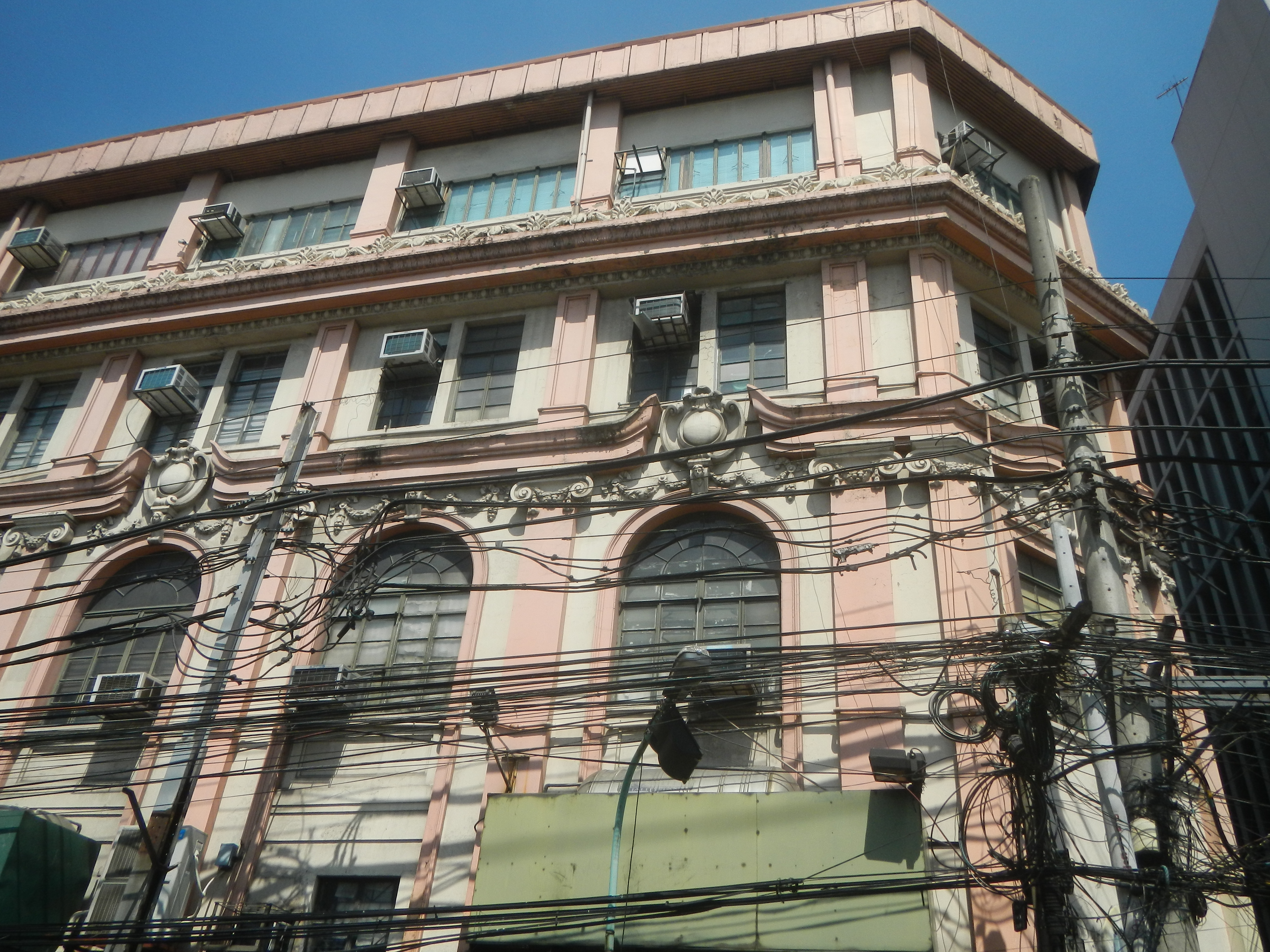

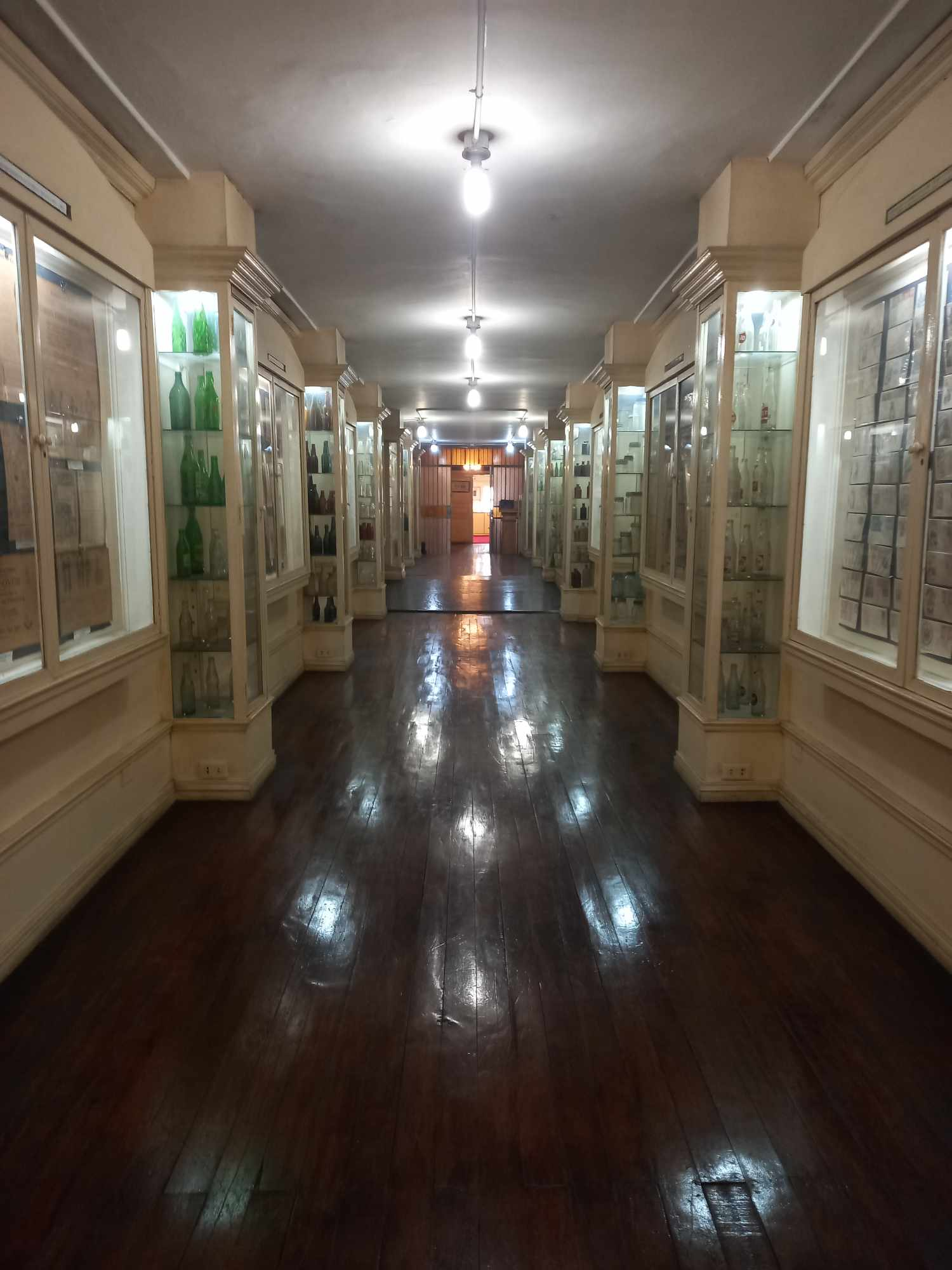
Interior of the Calvo Building Museum
