= Hizon–Ocampo House =

Heritage house in Pampanga, Philippines

The Hizon-Ocampo House (Filipino: Bahay Hizon-Ocampo Kapampangan: Bale Hizon-Ocampo) is a heritage house in the City of San Fernando, Pampanga. It is located on A. Consunji Street in Barangay Santo Rosario.

The house was first residence of Anacleto Hizon and Victoria Singian de Miranda. It was inherited by their daughter Leoncia Hizon who was married to Basilio Ocampo, gobernadorcillo of San Fernando. Among their children was renowned architect Fernando H. Ocampo.

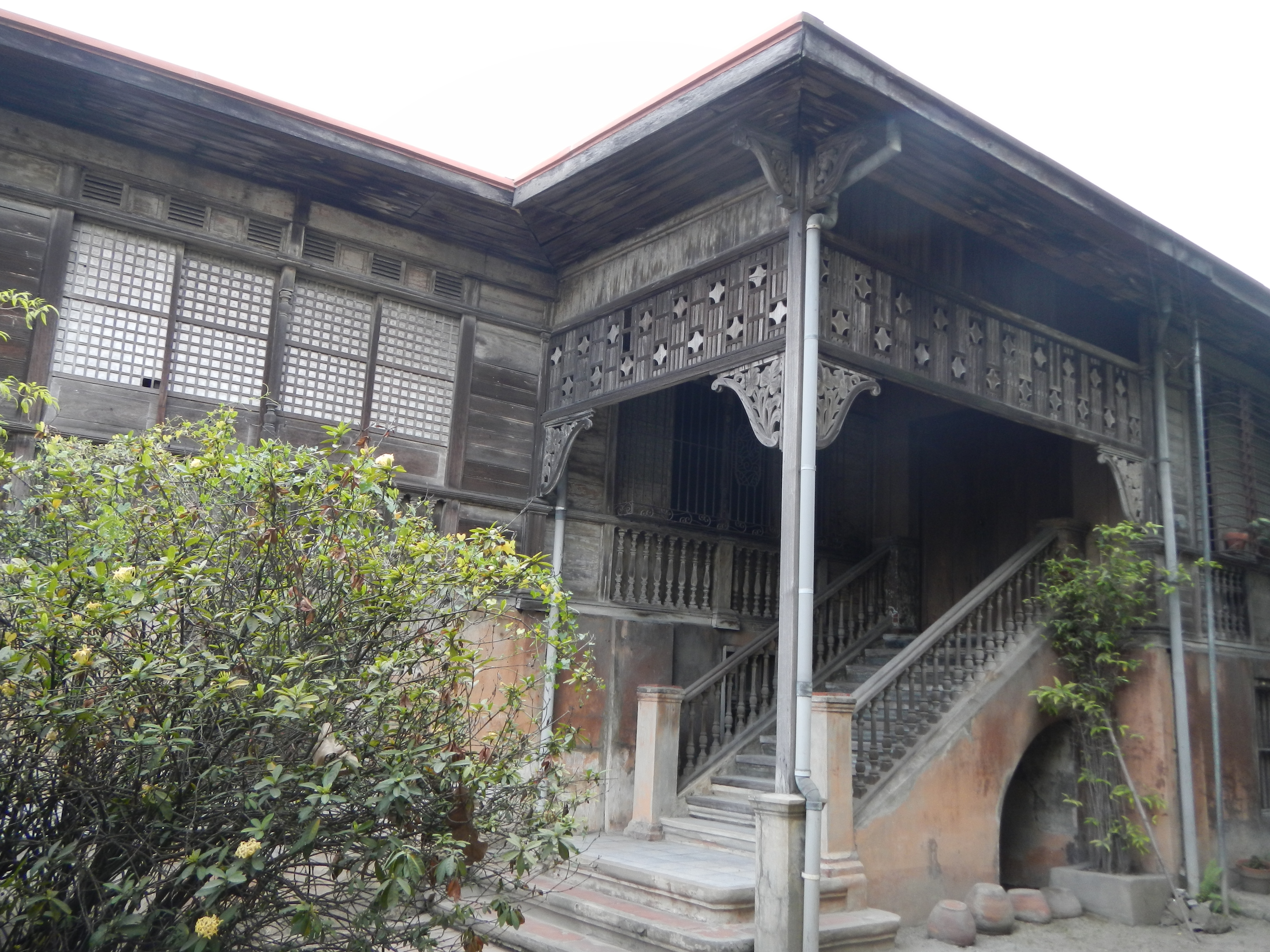
View of the stairs and side of the house

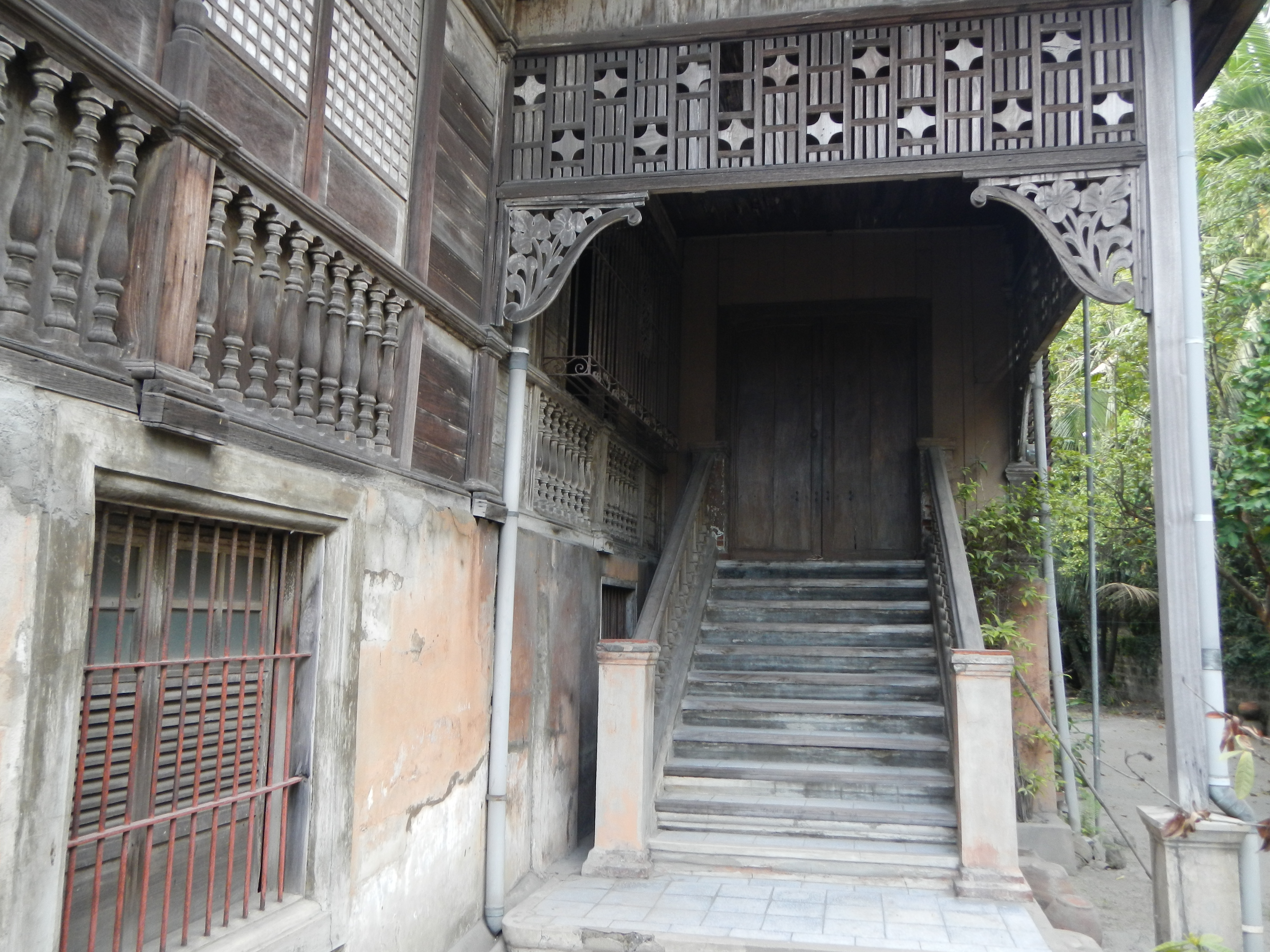
The stairs

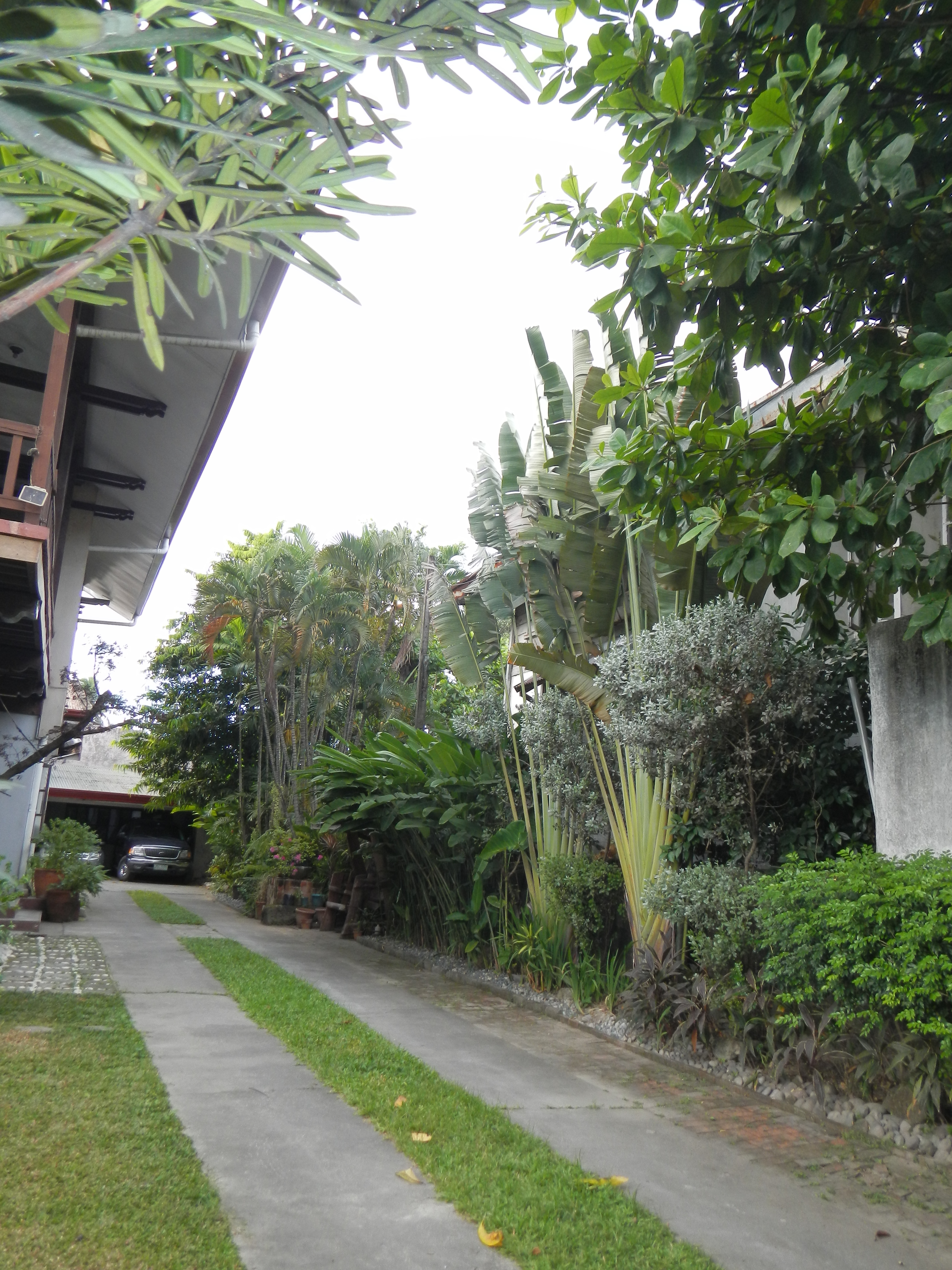
Driveway

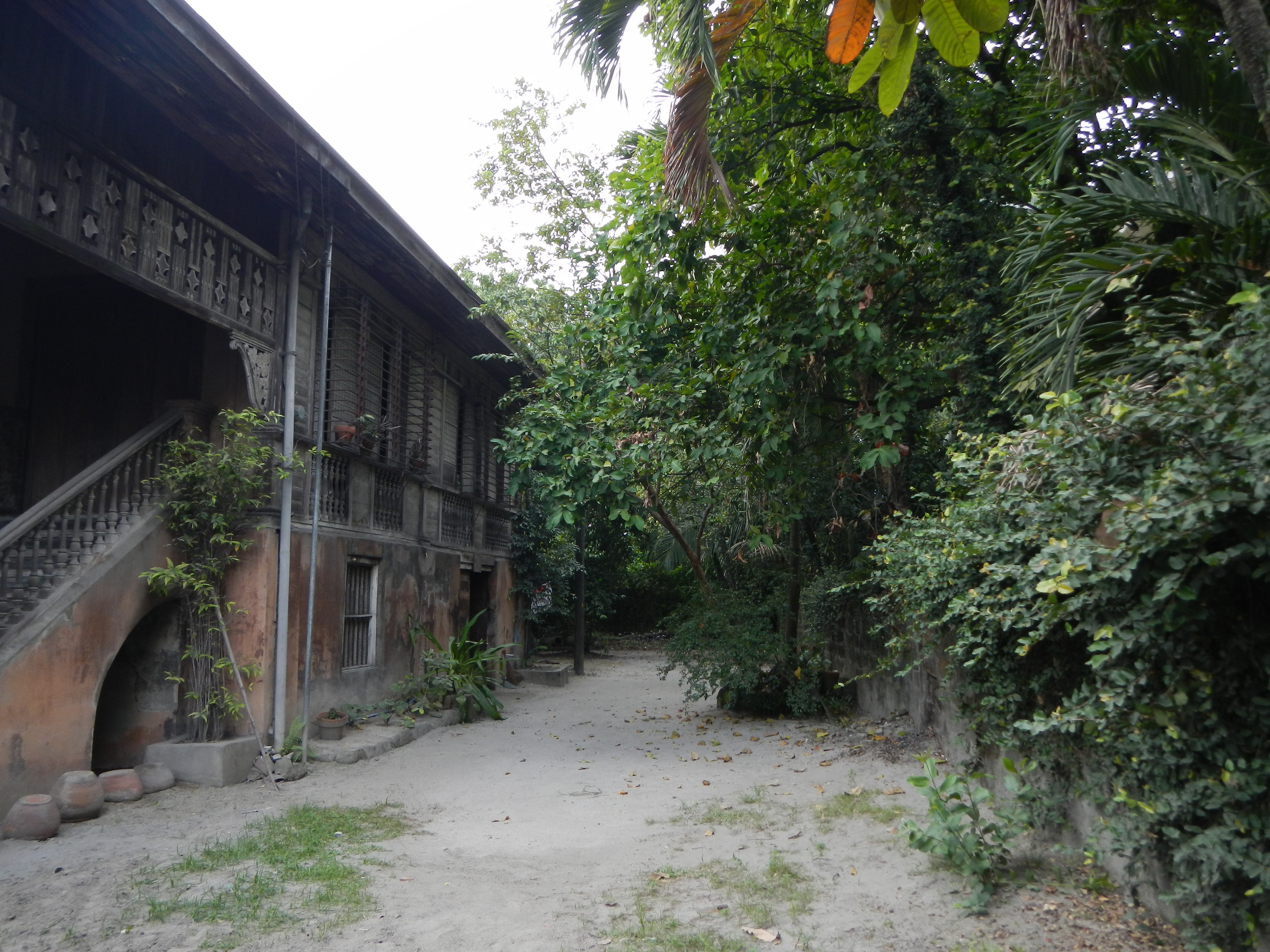
Passage and garden

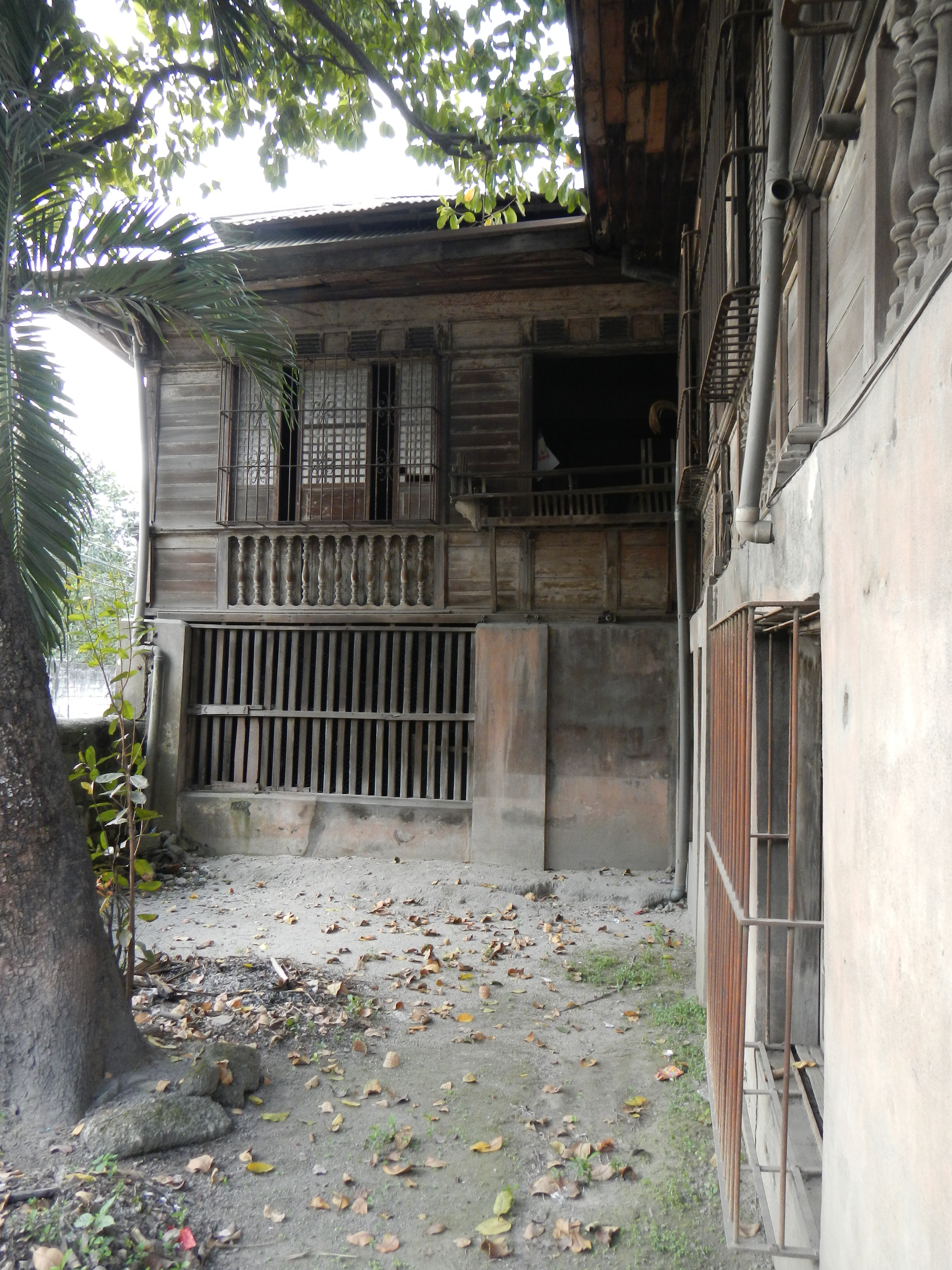
Left side of the House

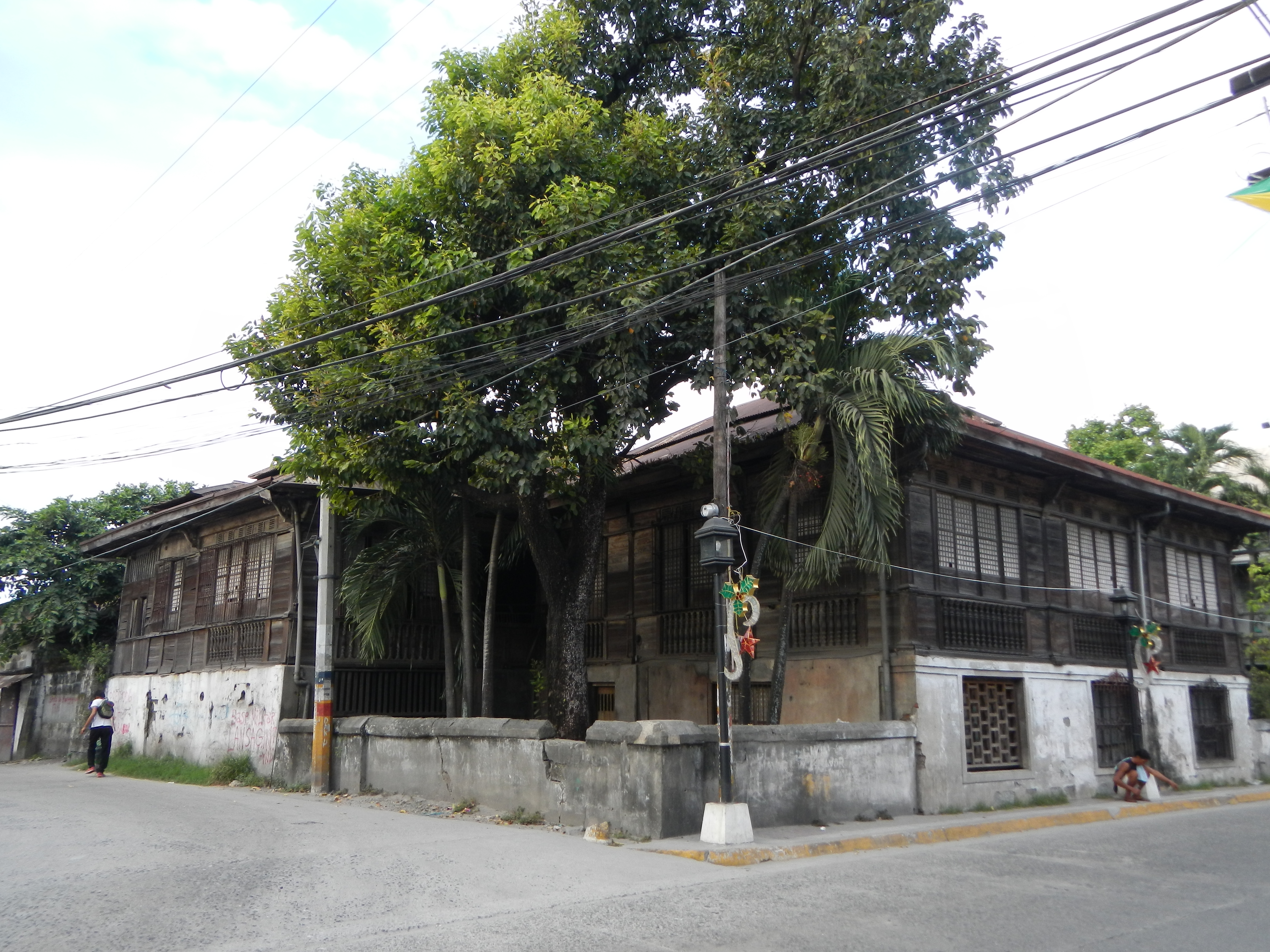
View from the street

== See also ==
- Ancestral houses of the Philippines
