= University of Santo Tomas Central Seminary Building =

University of Santo Tomas; Central Seminary Building
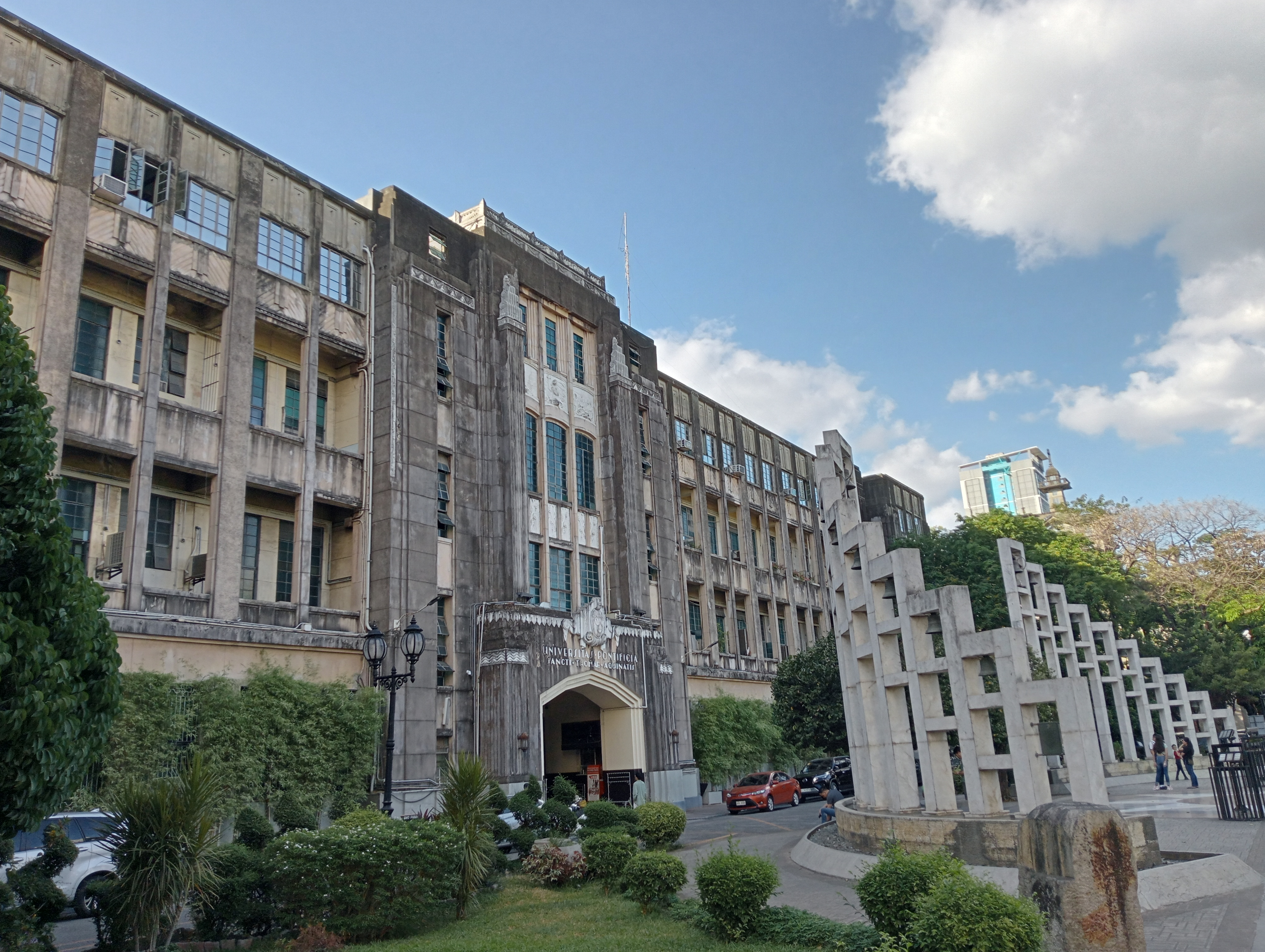
- Santísimo Rosario Parish

General information
- Type: Ecclesiastical and educational building
- Architectural style: Art Deco
- Location: España, Sampaloc, Manila
- Coordinates: 14°36′37″N 120°59′21″E
- Completed: November 13, 1932
- Owner: University of Santo Tomas

Design and construction
- Architect: Fernando H. Ocampo Sr.
- Architecture firm: Arguilles & Ocampo Architects

National Cultural Treasures
- Designated: January 25, 2010
- Reference no.: 1–2010

The University of Santo Tomas Central Seminary Building currently houses the Santísimo Rosario Parish, the Central Seminary, and the Faculties of Ecclesiastical Studies of the Pontifical and Royal University of Santo Tomas in Manila. The parish was canonically inaugurated on April 26, 1942, by Michael J. O'Doherty, the Archbishop of Manila. On January 25, 2010, the National Museum of the Philippines formally declared the Central Seminary Building as a National Cultural Treasure.

== Architecture ==
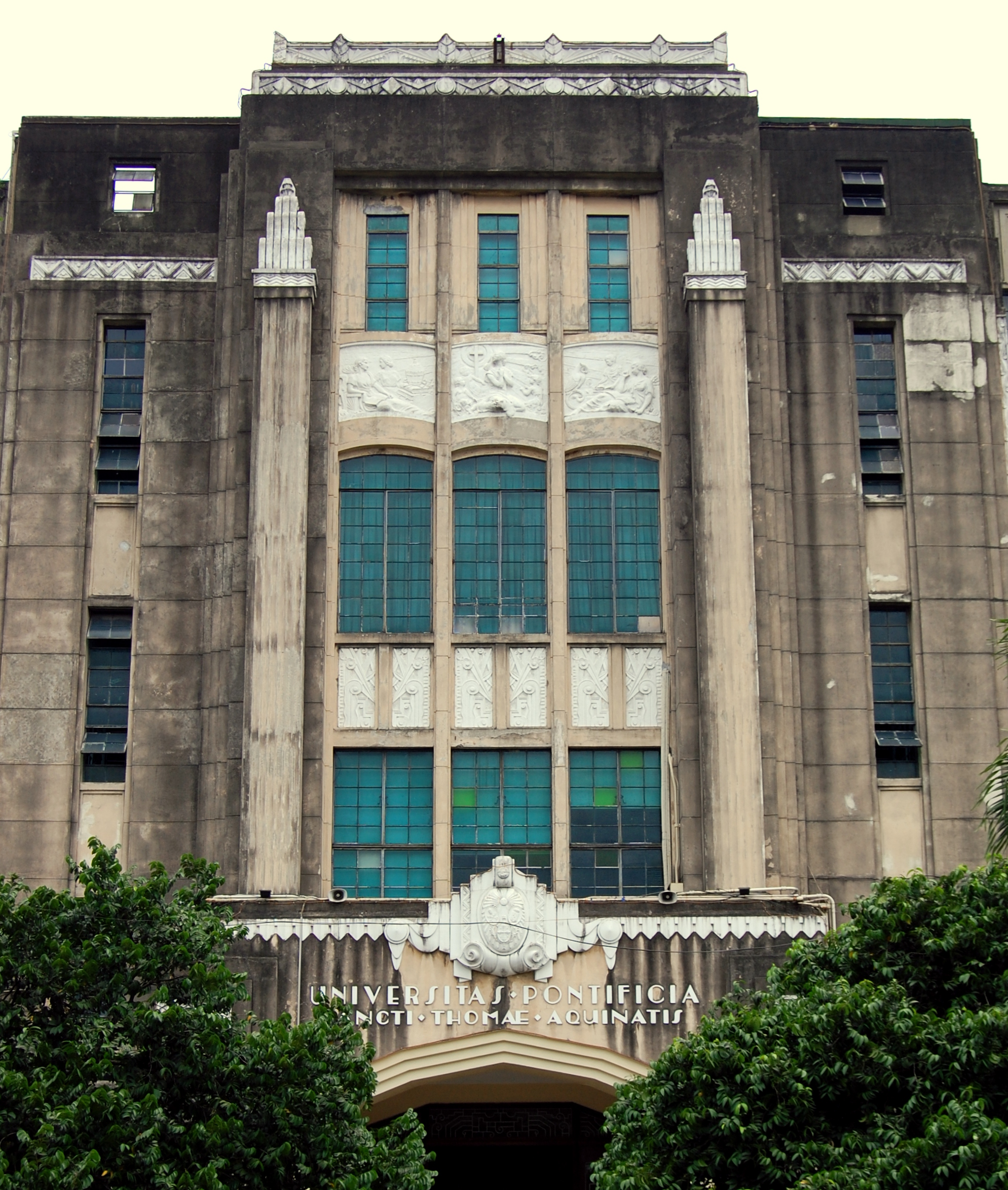
Central Seminary Building

Santísimo Rosario Parish
- UST Chapel
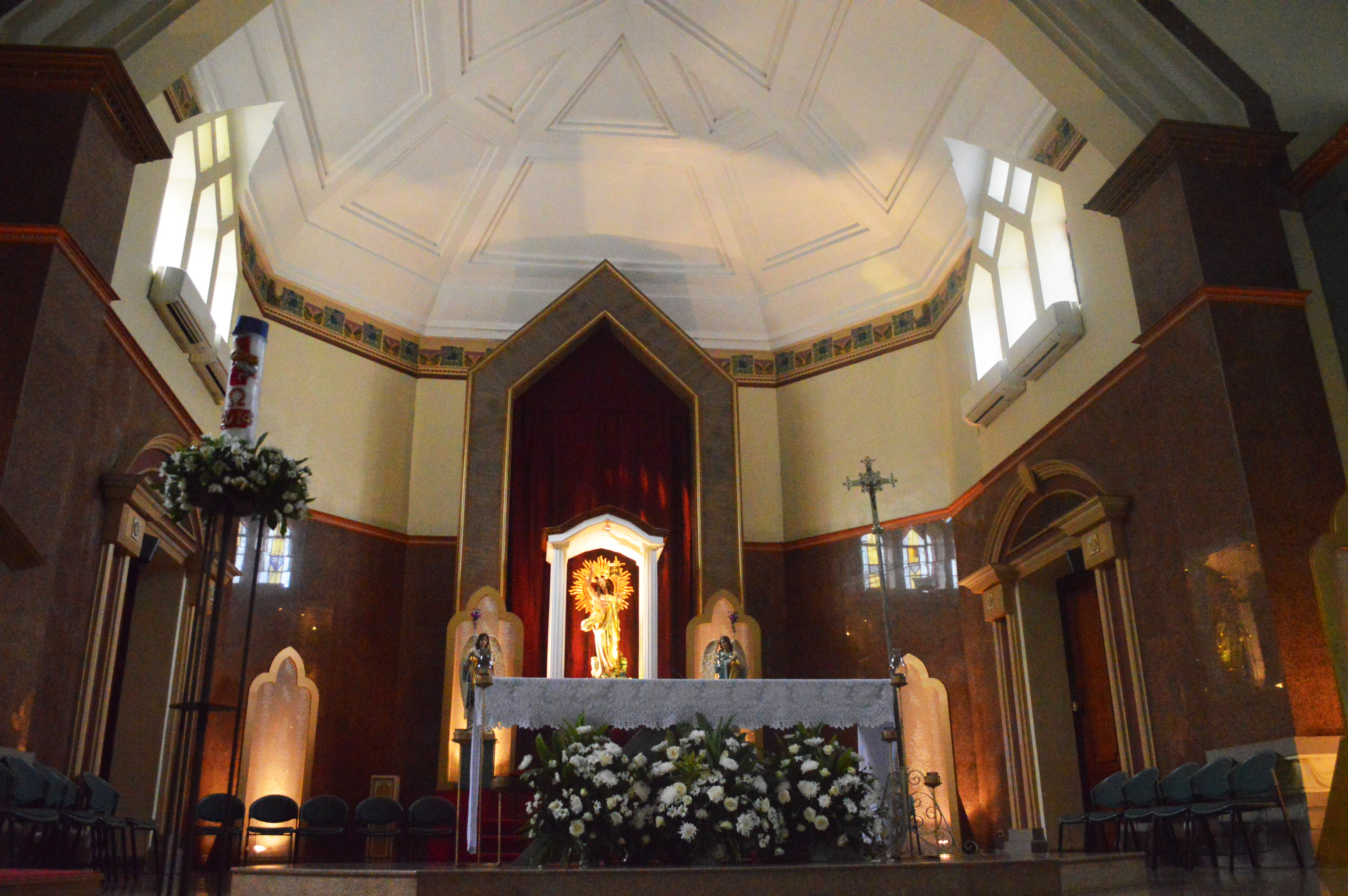
- The chancel of the parish church
- Santísimo Rosario Parish
- 14°36′37″N 120°59′21″E
- Country: Philippines
- Denomination: Roman Catholic
- Religious order: Dominican Order

History
- Status: Parish church
- Founded: April 26, 1942
- Dedication: Our Lady of the Holy Rosary

Architecture
- Functional status: Active
- Architect: Fernando H. Ocampo Sr.
- Completed: November 13, 1932

Administration
- Province: Manila
- Archdiocese: Manila
- Deanery: Our Lady of Loreto
- Parish: Santísimo Rosario

Clergy
- Priest(s): Rev. Fr. Glen Mar Gamboa, OP

The Central Seminary of the University of Santo Tomas was designed by Fernando Hizon Ocampo Sr. It was built in the 1930s. The plan of the seminary was configured in the form of the letter E, with courtyards bisecting the wings. The boxy building had an elongated frontage assembling a continuous band of balconies and windows on the second and third level. The structure's horizontally-oriented massing was broken by an engaged central section at the main entrance and two other similar treatments at the end portions. An art deco relief, bud-like finials, and a tableau embellished the stepped pylon at the entrance.

== Official declaration ==
Section 3 of "The Cultural Properties Preservation and Protection Act" states that a "National Cultural Treasure is a unique object found locally, possessing outstanding historical, cultural, artistic and/or scientific value which is significant and important to this country and nation." This recognition marks the first ever inclusion of an educational institution among the ranks of National Cultural Treasures, with the majority of structures being churches and the rest being terrestrial landmarks, intangible cultural property and movable objects. As heritage sites, they will be accorded protection and recognition, giving importance to their witness of 400 years of tumultuous Philippine history.

== Gallery ==
UST Central Seminary Building

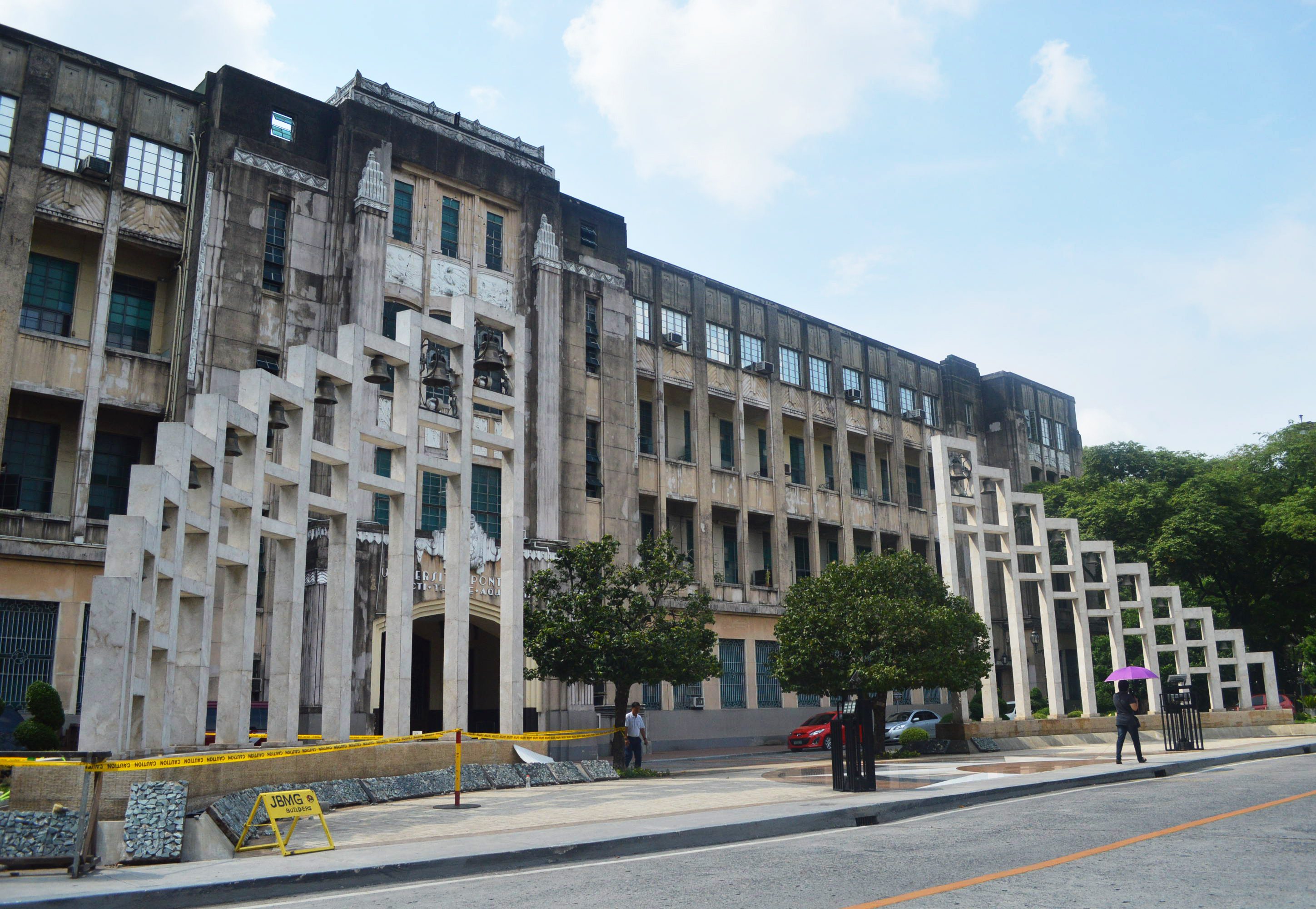
View from Gonzales Drive, with carillon

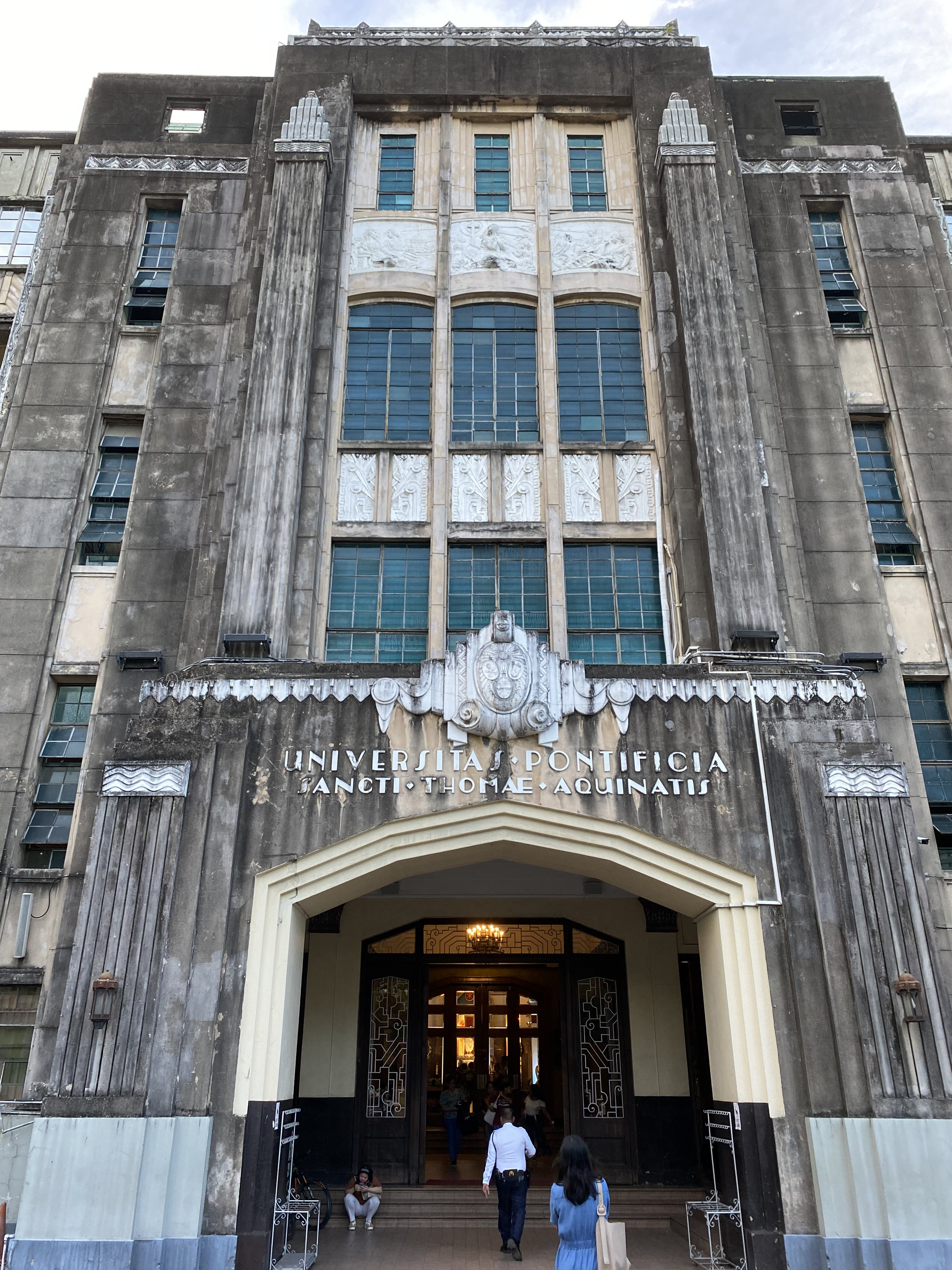
Closeup of façade

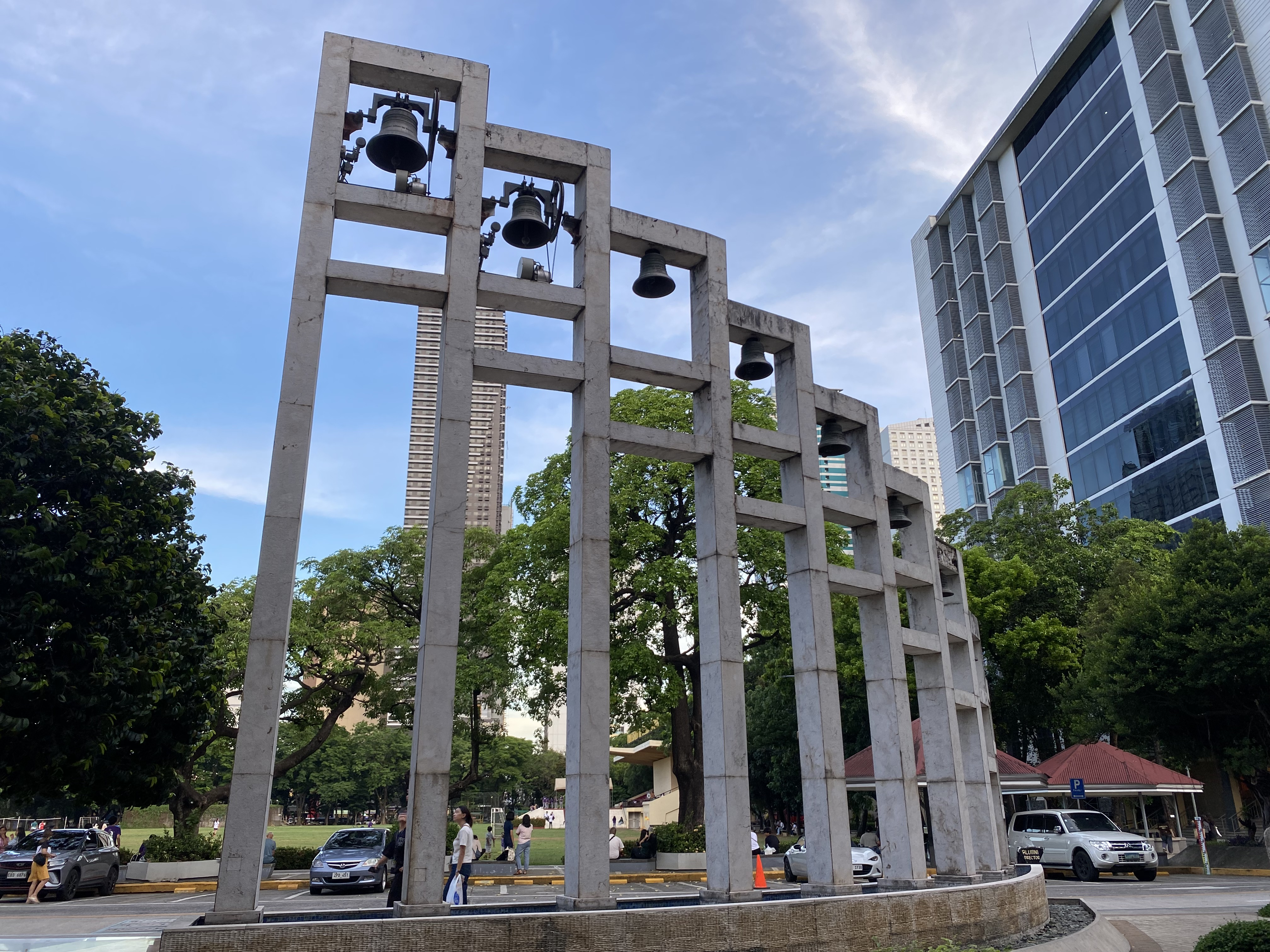
Closeup of the left side carillon

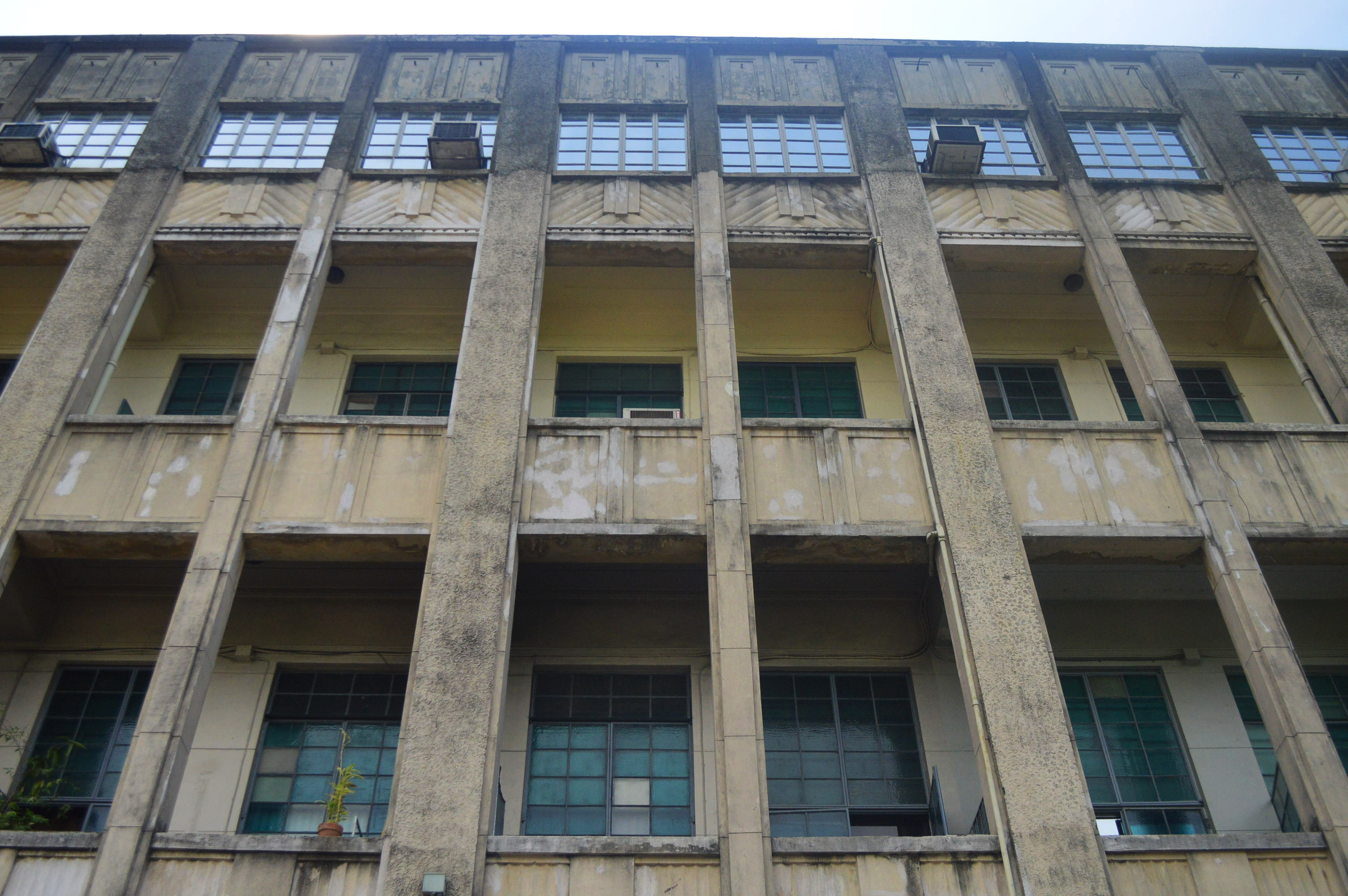
Regular fenestration

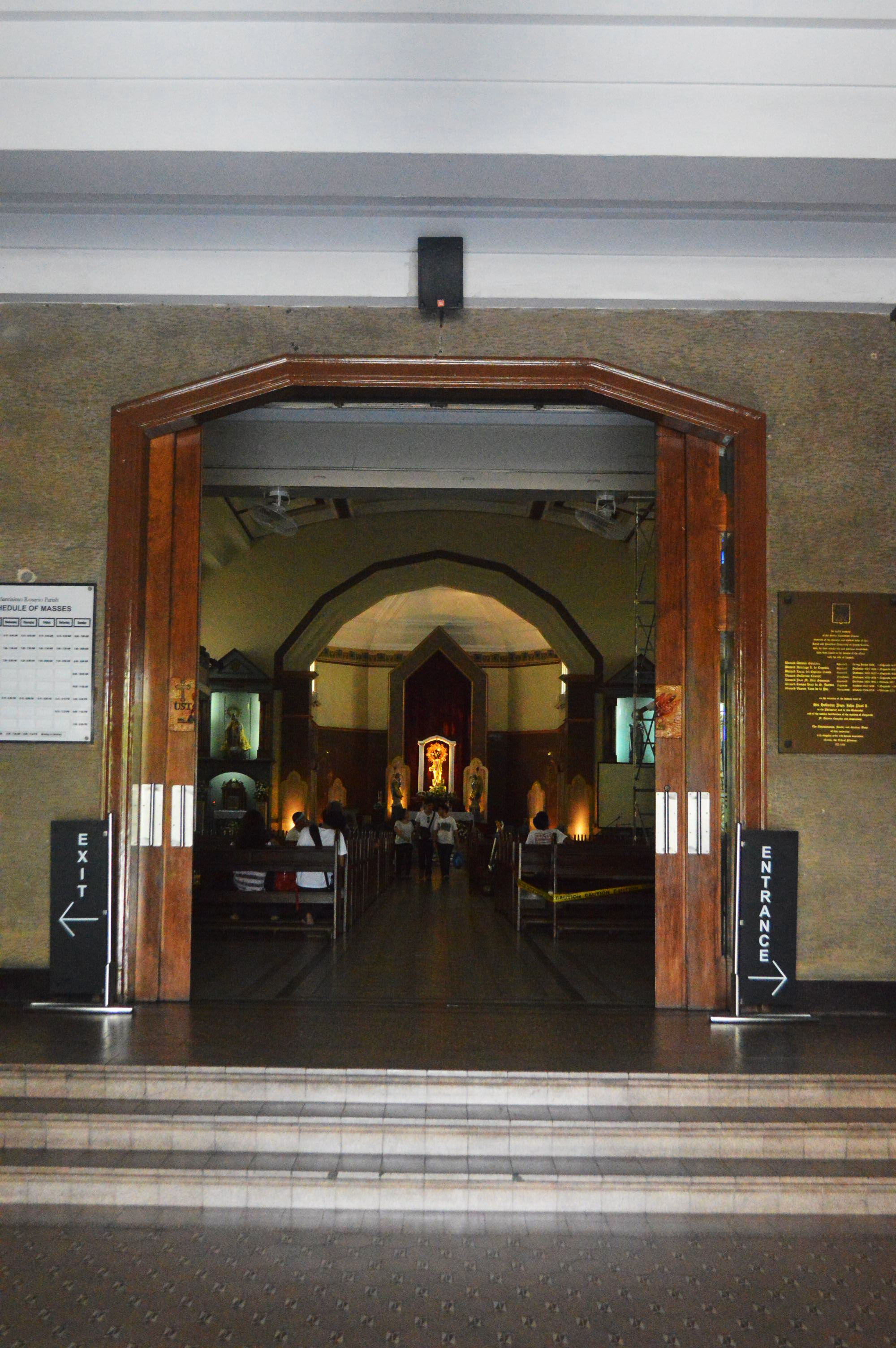
Entrance to Santísimo Rosario Parish Church

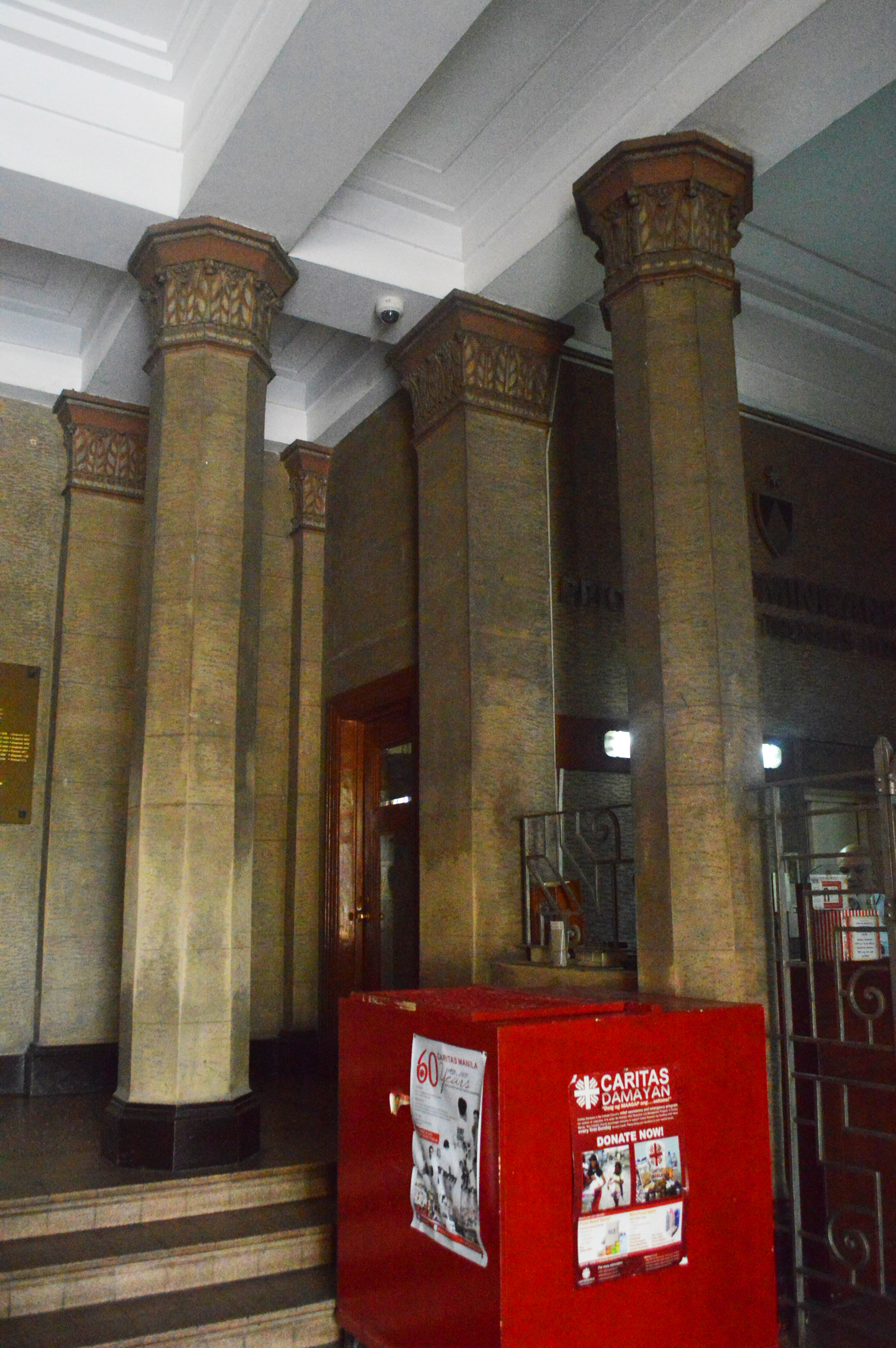
Columns
Santísimo Rosario Parish Church

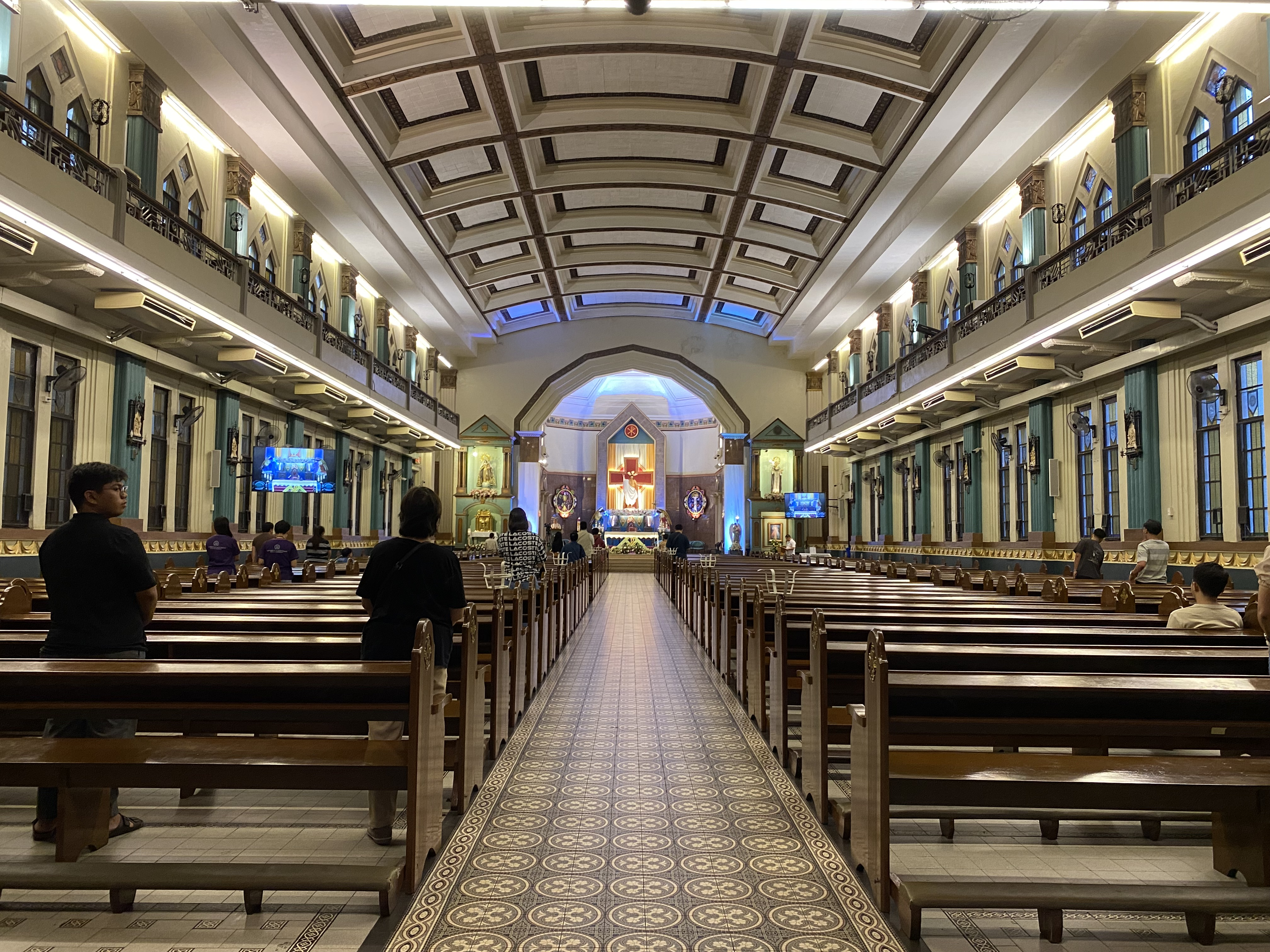
The nave from the entrance

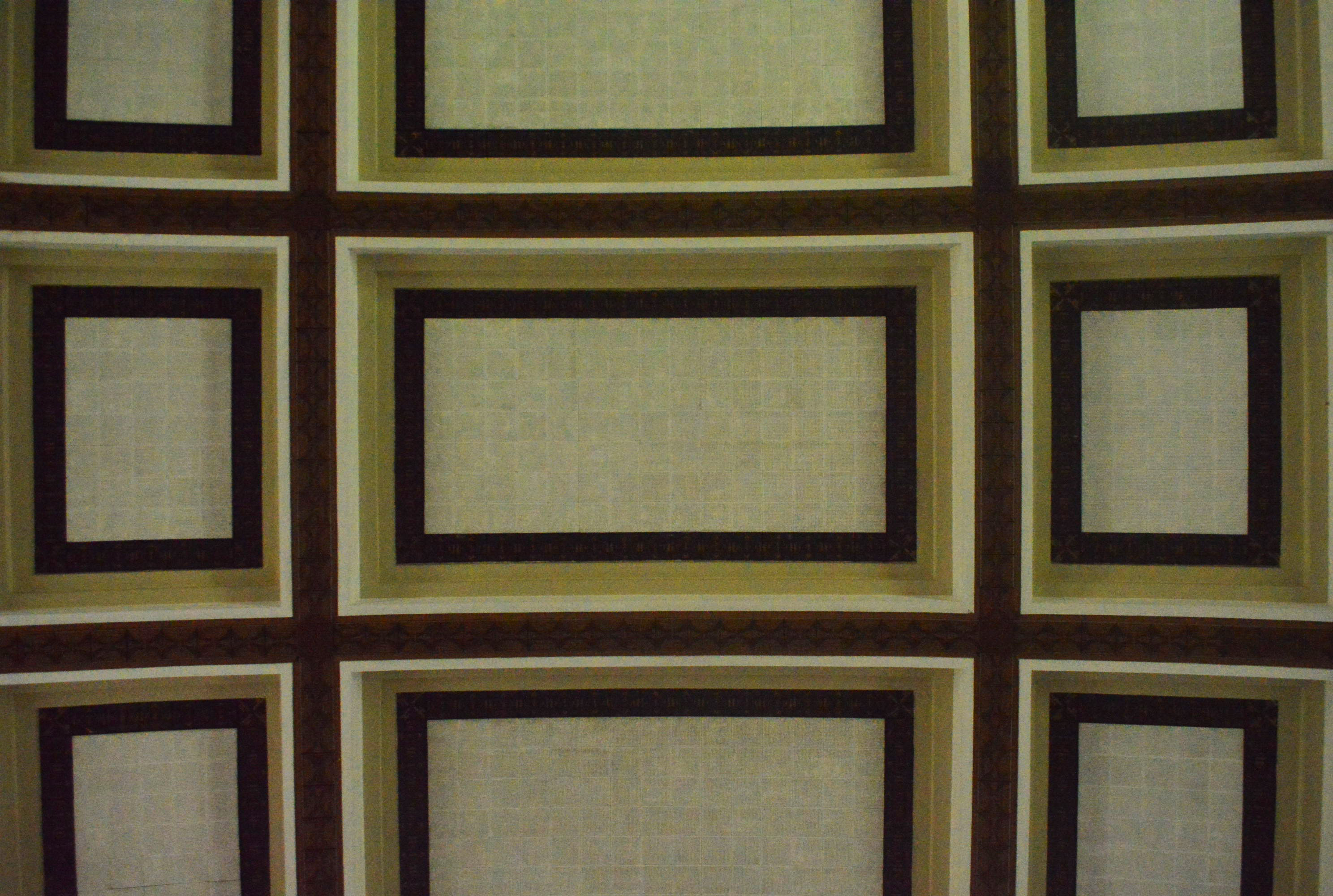
The coffered ceiling

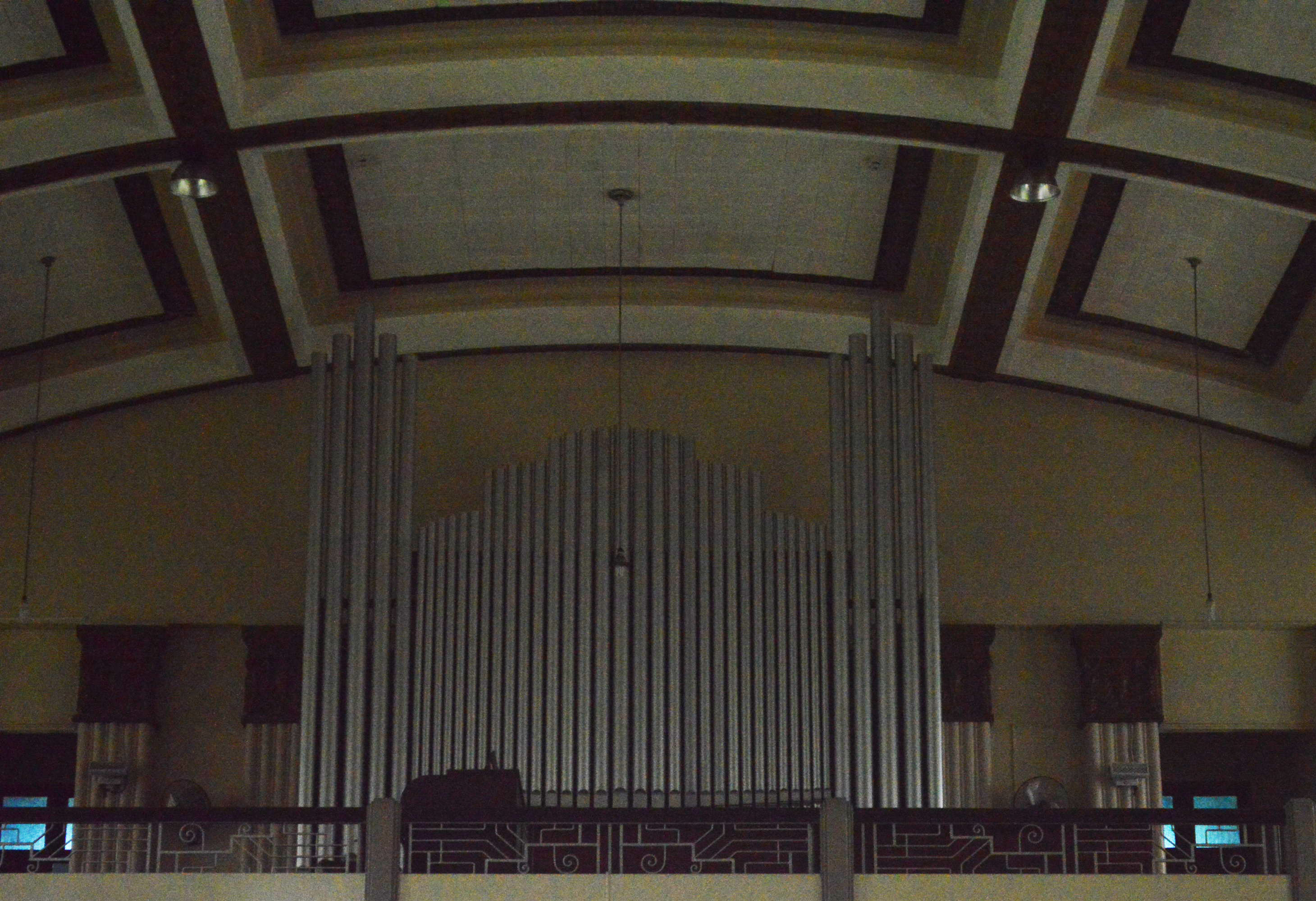
Organ in the choir loft

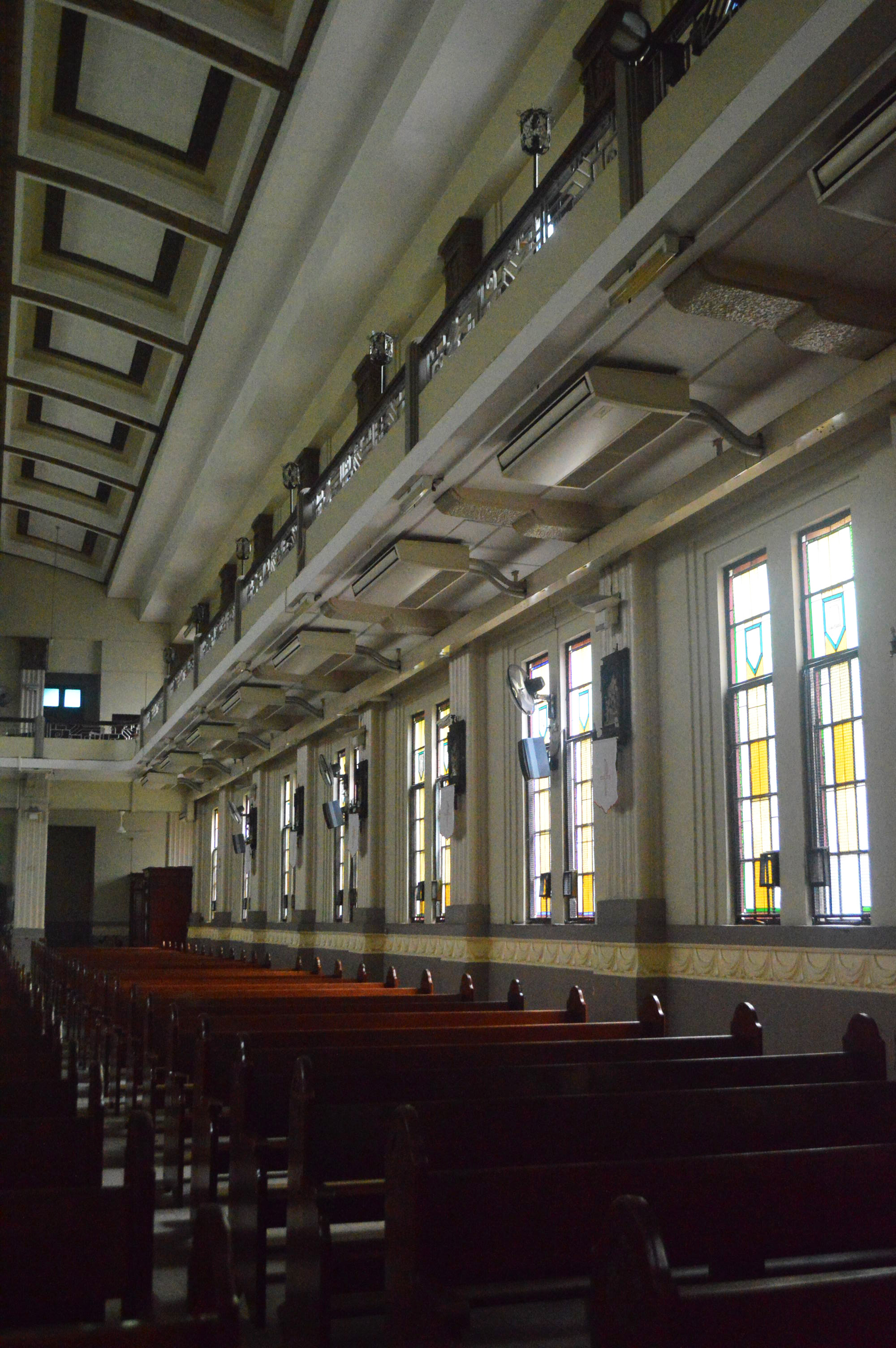
Balcony seats

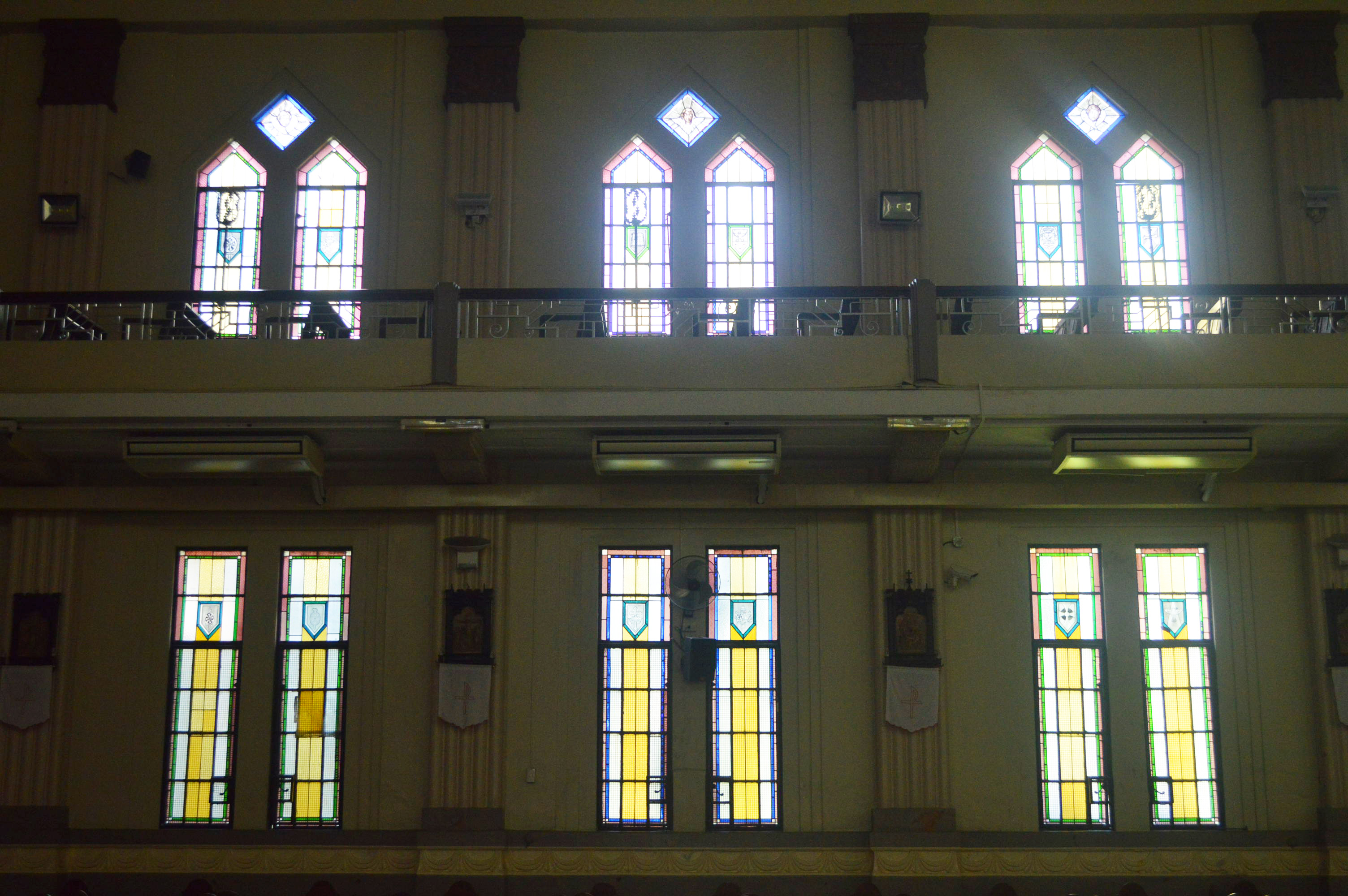
Window designs

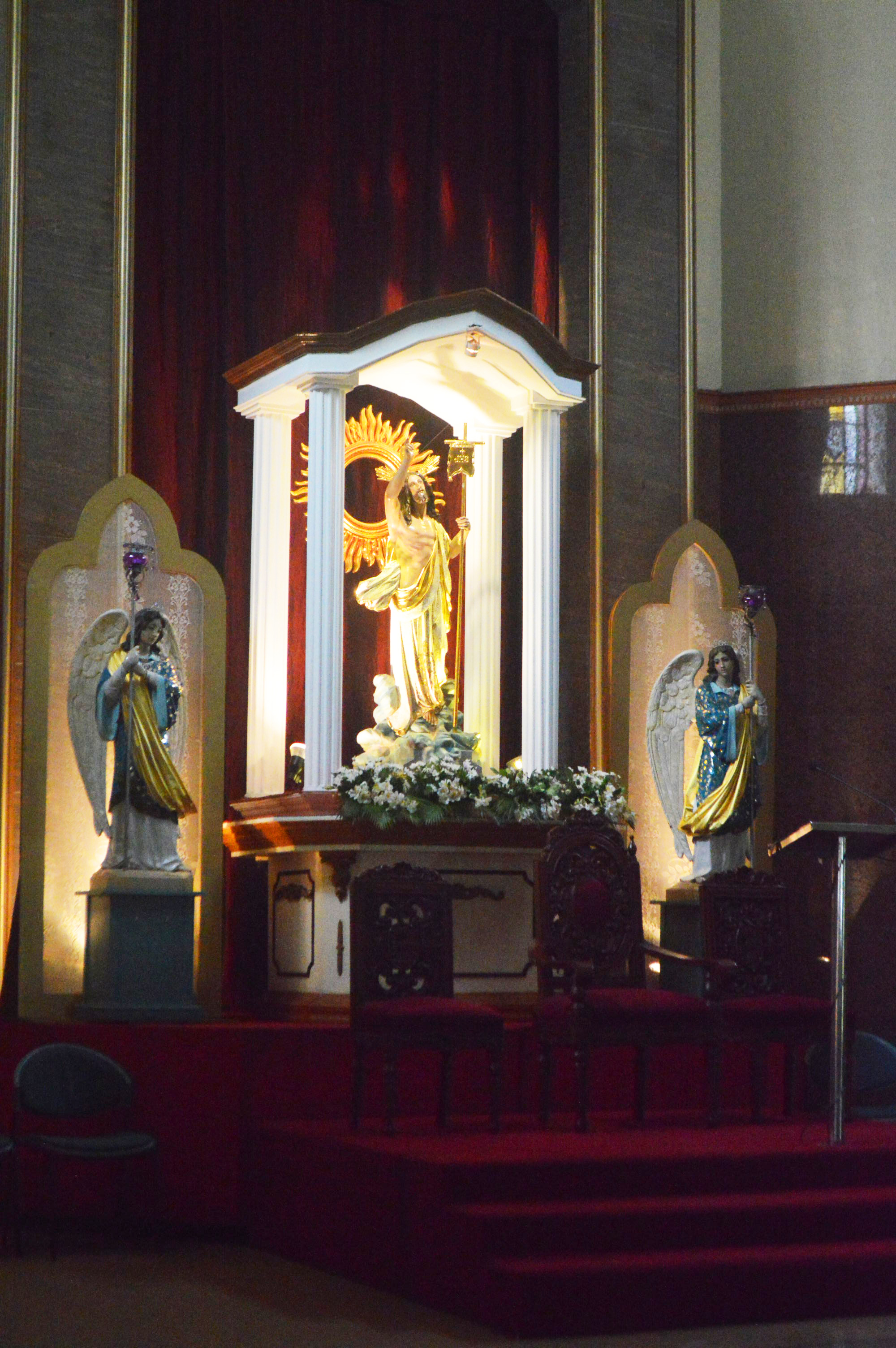
Altar

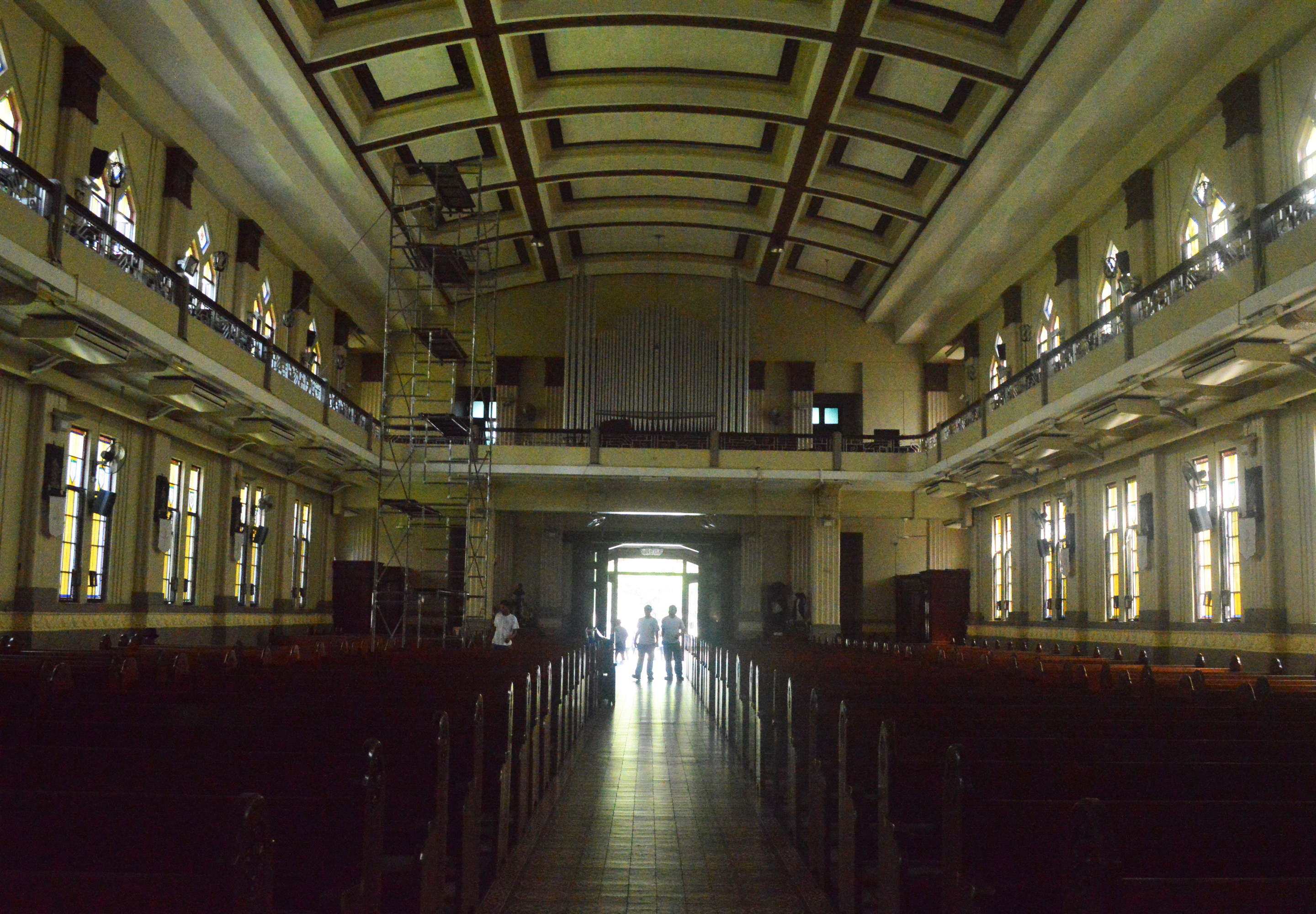
Viewed from the chancel
