= Don Roman Santos Building =

Office building in Manila, Philippines

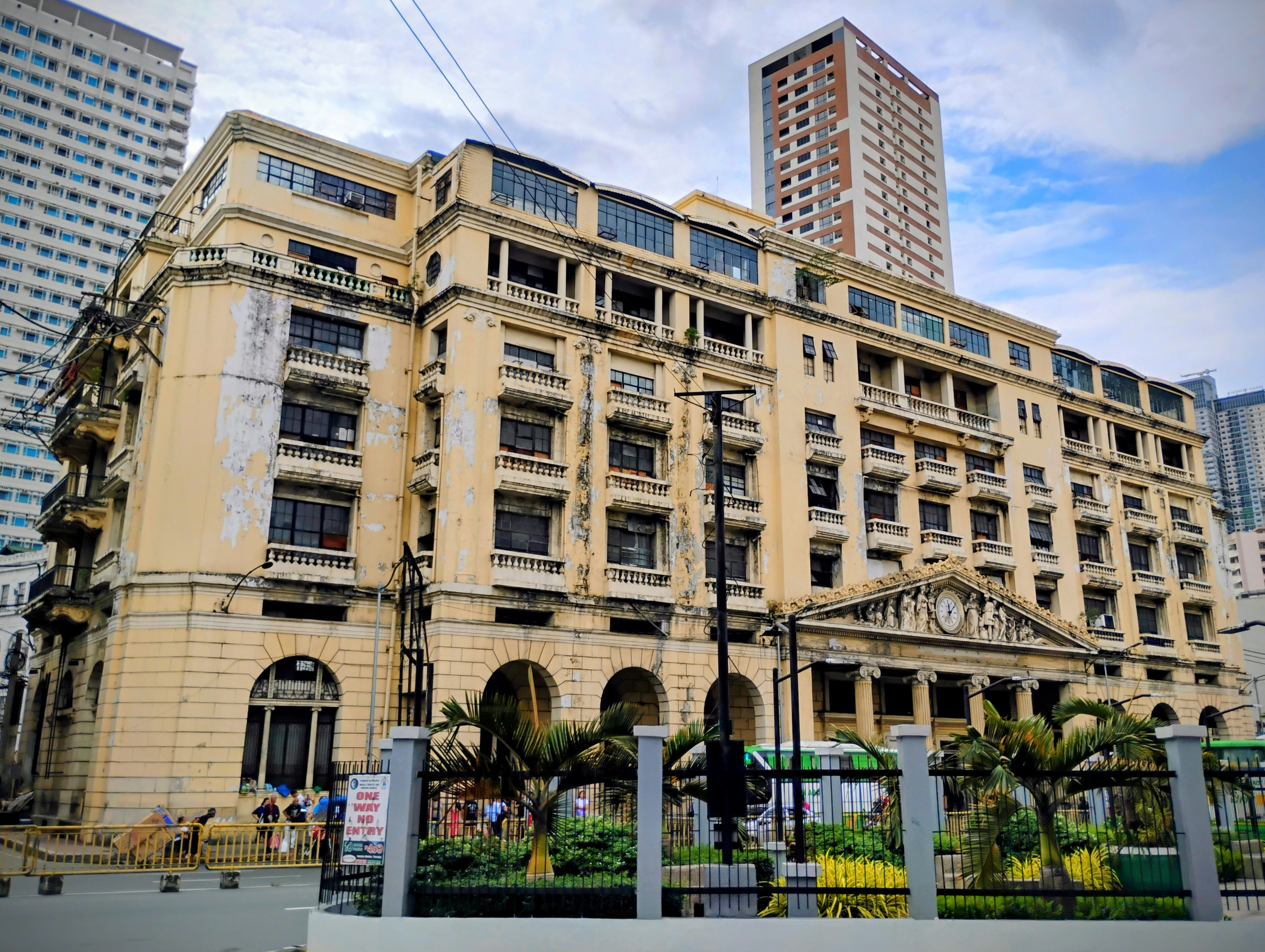
- The facade of Don Roman Santos Building facing Escolta Street in 2025
- Interactive map of the Don Roman Santos Building area
- Former names: Consolidated Investments Building

General information
- Status: Completed
- Architectural style: Neoclassical architecture
- Location: Escolta Street, Santa Cruz, Manila, Philippines
- Coordinates: 14°35′55.29″N 120°58′48.57″E
- Completed: 1894
- Renovated: 1957

Technical details
- Floor count: 9

Design and construction
- Architects: Joan Josep Jose Hervas y Arizmendi (1894); Andres P. Luna, FPIA (1937)

The Don Roman Santos Building is a neoclassical building located along the historic Escolta Street in Santa Cruz, Manila, Philippines. It fronts Plaza Lacson (formerly Plaza Goiti) which leads to directly to Carriedo Street or to Rizal Avenue. It was built in 1894 and expanded in 1957.

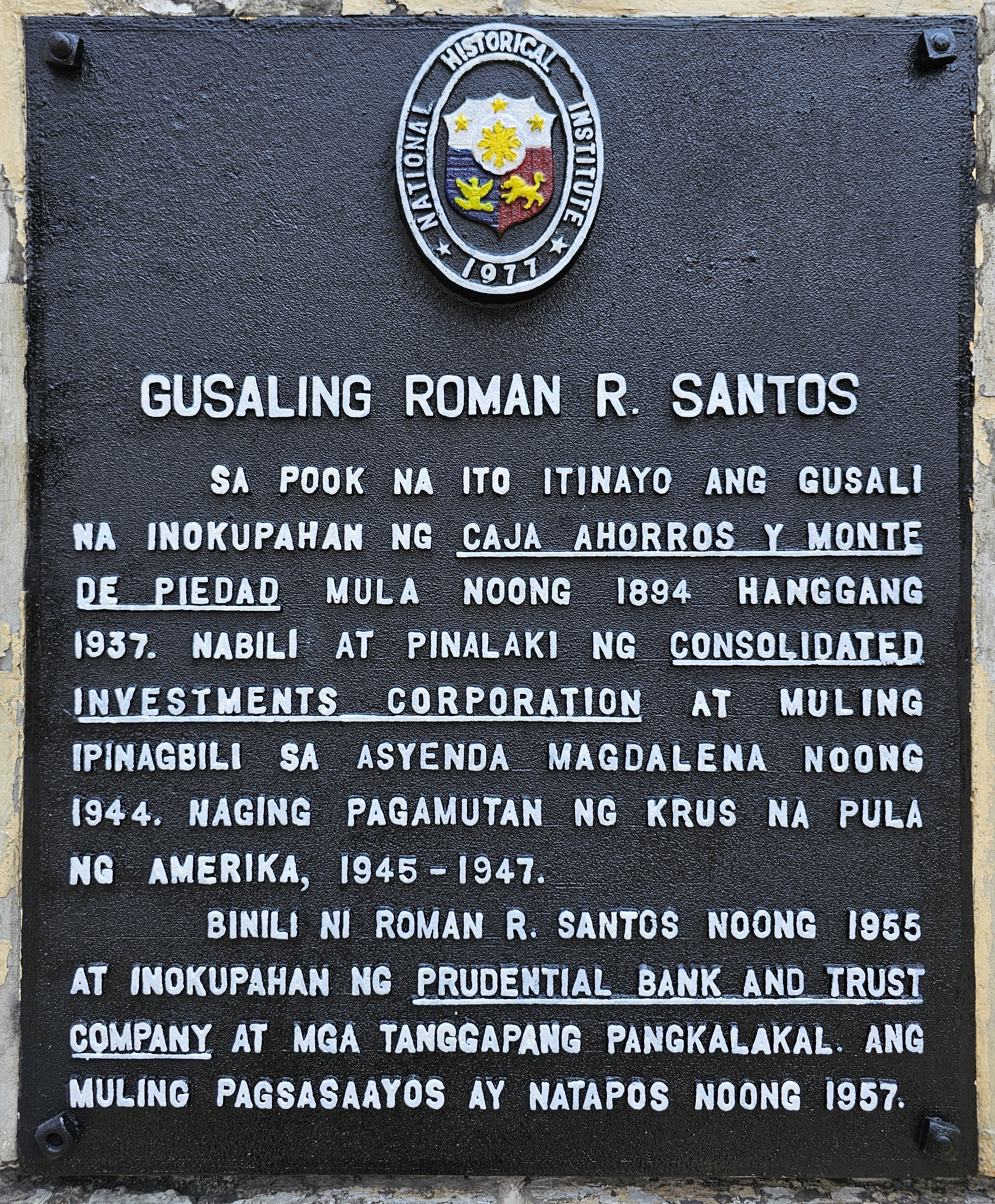
National historical marker installed in 1977

The site has been the original offices for Monte de Piedad Savings Bank from 1894 to 1937. The ownership of the building was transferred to Consolidated Investment Corporation in 1937. It then became an American Red Cross-operated hospital from 1945 to 1947 after which housed Prudential Bank and South Supermart. Currently, the ground floor serves a branch for the Bank of the Philippine Islands after it acquired Prudential Bank in 2005.

== See also ==
- Commercial Bank and Trust Company Building
