= Angelicum (disambiguation) =

Angelicum is Pontifical University of St. Thomas Aquinas (Angelicum) in Rome, Italy. Angelicum is also the title of the university's peer reviewed journal.

Angelicum may also refer to:

- Angelicum School Iloilo, Iloilo City, Philippines
- Angelicum College, Quezon City, Philippines
