= HUB: Make Lab =

- Location: Manila, Metro Manila, Philippines
- Coordinates: 14°35′56.0″N 120°58′47.3″E
- Address: First United Building, 413, Escolta Street, Binondo, Manila
- Opened: 2016
- Owner: Sylianteng family Escolta Commercial Association Inc.
- Num. of stores: varies
- Num. of anchor tenants: 3
- Floors: 1
- Public transit: Carriedo
- Website: HUB:Make Lab

HUB: Make Lab also known as the Hub, is an adaptive reuse, incubator space for creative startups and artists which also acts as an alternative shopping center. Located within the former space occupied by Berg's Department Store in First United Building in Escolta St., Binondo, Manila, Philippines.

Opened in 2016 after the success of the Saturday X Future Market, organized by the artist collective, 98B COLLABoratory along with the increasing foot traffic in Escolta during its first street party known as the Escolta Block Party. HUB: Make Lab is a project of 98B COLLABoratory and the First United Building. In December 2018, it has since then evolved into its own organization serving its creative and action-oriented communities. It has also become a reference for other new creative hubs in the Philippines, one notable example is Pineapple Lab, formerly located in Poblacion, Makati City which was closed down in 2020 due to COVID-19 pandemic.

== History ==
Established in 2012, the artist collective 98B COLLABoratory opened its current studio at the mezzanine of the First United Building. In 2013, 98B started their monthly Saturday X Future Market as an attempt to revitalize the historic Escolta street.

== Tenants ==
HUB: Make Lab is an alternative shopping space where local creatives promote their works and crafts. It also hosted some exhibitions within the spaces as well. Each space is leasable ranging from 6.12 to 12.25 square meters and serve 22 businesses.

Alongside its art and culture-focused retail spaces, HUB: Make Lab also has three permanent tenants within the space.

=== Fred's Revolución ===
Opened its first branch in Cubao Expo, the second branch of Fred's Revolución is a rustic pub located adjacent to HUB itself.

=== The Den: Coffee & Contemporary Culture ===
The Den is a coffee shop located at the back of First United Building. It also acts as a space where Philippine coffee and contemporary culture intersect through programming that explores art, design, music, lifestyle, emerging communities, and new ideas.

=== Folk 1006 ===
A rustic barbershop derived from the words, Folk which meant common people and 1006, the area code of the Binondo district where Escolta Street is located.
