= Natividad Building =

Historic building in Manila, Philippines

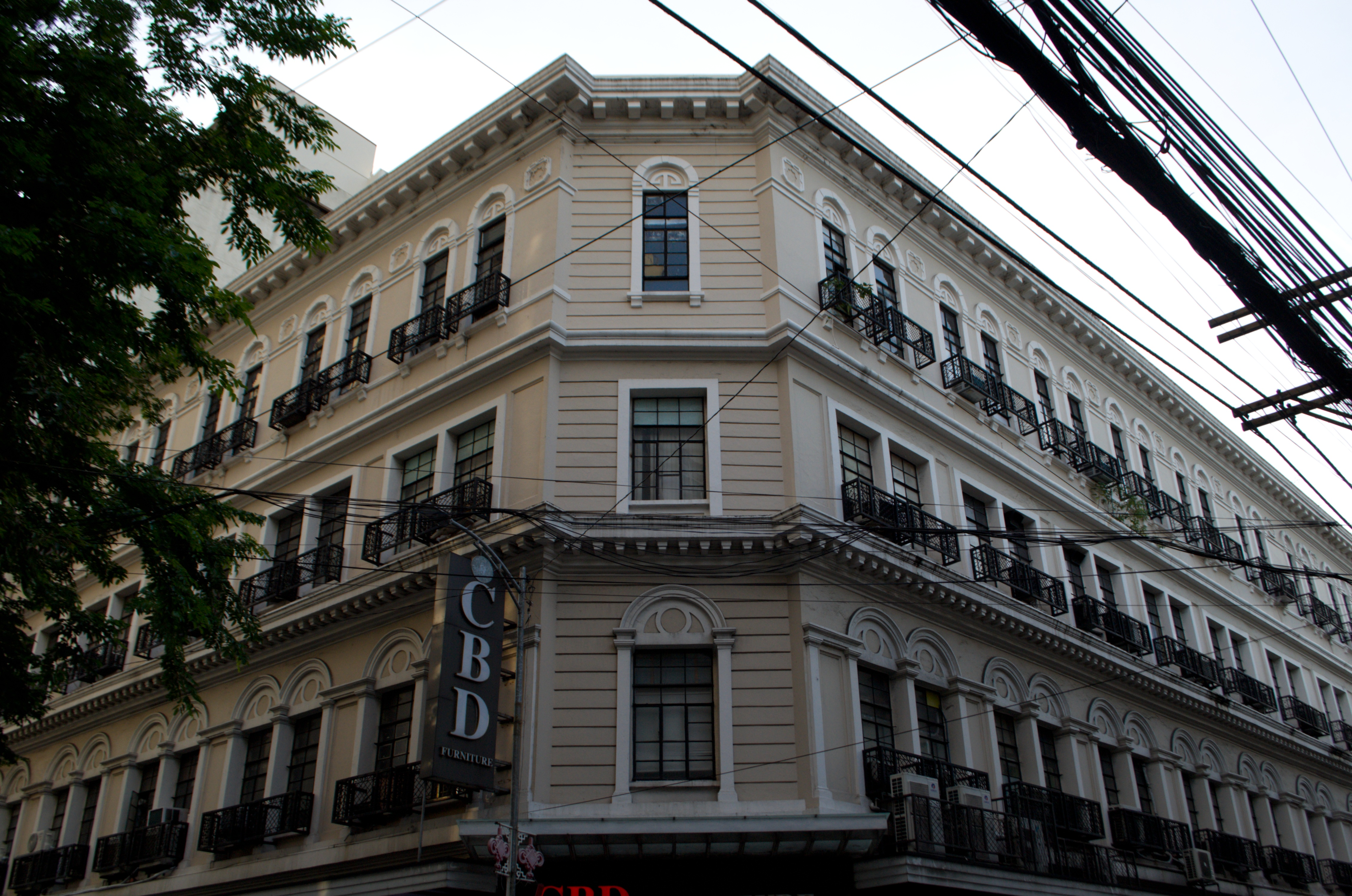
- The facade of Natividad Building along Escolta Street
- Interactive map of the Natividad Building area

General information
- Architectural style: Beaux-Arts architecture
- Location: Escolta Street, Binondo, Manila, Philippines
- Coordinates: 14°35′53″N 120°58′43″E
- Groundbreaking: 1928

Design and construction
- Architect: Fernando de la Cantera Blondeau

The Natividad Building is a historic building along Escolta corner Tomas Pinpin, Binondo, Manila, Philippines. Designed by Philippine-born Spanish architect Fernando de la Cantera Blondeau, it is an outstanding example of beaux-arts architecture. It once housed the Philippine Insurance Commission. During World War II, the building was spared from destruction albeit suffered some damages.
