= Capitol Theater (Manila) =

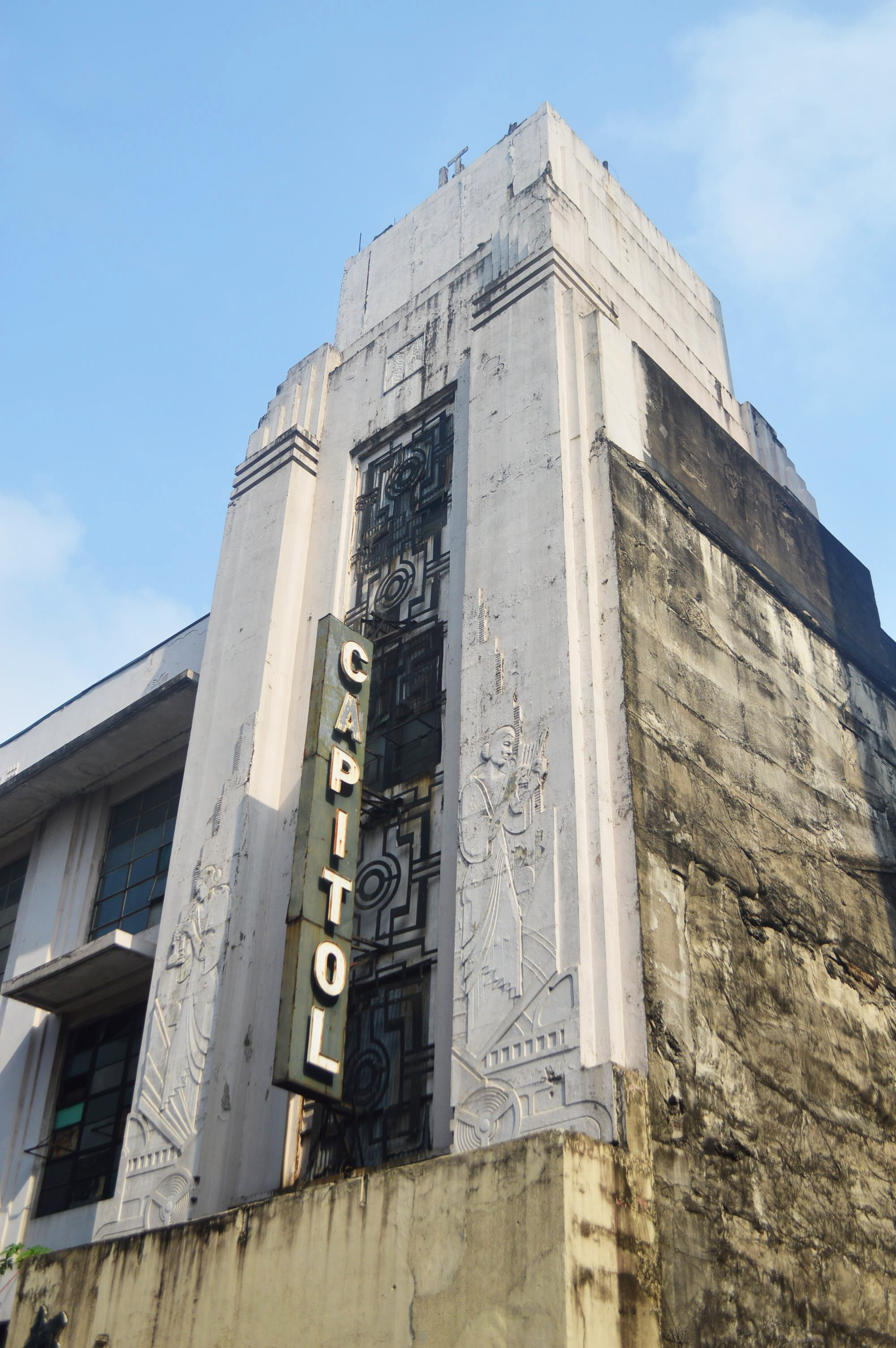
- Tower of the Capitol Theater in Escolta where the main entrance is located.

- Location within Manila Location within Metro Manila Location within Luzon Location within Philippines

General information
- Status: Demolished
- Type: Theater building
- Architectural style: Art deco
- Location: Escolta, Manila, 250 Escolta Street, Binondo, Manila, Philippines
- Coordinates: 14°35′50″N 120°58′40″E
- Groundbreaking: 1930
- Inaugurated: January 8, 1935
- Demolished: 2020
- Owner: Roxan Inc.

Technical details
- Material: Concrete
- Floor area: 3,067 m^{2} (33,010 sq ft)

Design and construction
- Architect: Juan F. Nakpil

Other information
- Seating capacity: 1,100

The Capitol Theater was an Art deco theater in Manila, Philippines. It was built during the 1930s at #250 Escolta Street, Binondo part of the city's primary commercial district, together with the Lyric Theater near corner nueva street present day E.T. Yuchengco Street. It was designed with a double-balcony by National Artist Juan Nakpil and that was considered a rare feat during that era.

== Architecture ==
A decorative located over the main building entrance, was intentionally designed to be different from the rest of the building. The tower façade is symmetrically composed with lines offsetting each other to emphasize the strong and rigid geometric forms; this is most especially shown at the top, with recessed tiers resembling a ziggurat and the geometric details at the top corners. At the center of this is an art deco grille-work that is made up of squares and circles surrounded by two pilasters on both sides. Both of the vertical surfaces have low-relief figures depicting two Filipina muses which are portrayed wearing native dress or 'traje de mestizas' and local fauna which include carabao head. This was done by Francesco Riccardo Monti, also known for his works in some of the famous buildings in Metro Manila. Strong lines and soft curves outline the pleats of the gowns worn by the muses. To represent its use as a theater, both muses each hold a mask and a lyre, associated with theater arts and music, respectively.

The external elements found in the building relate to the function of the structure as a cinema and the Art Deco style with its strong geometric forms. Crowning the top of the central tower is the world "Capitol," the name of the structure in concrete. Due to natural and human-caused damage, only the I and T remain.

The national flower, sampaguita was the underlying motif of the interior spaces shown in wrought-iron grills on the stairs, the lobby, the foyer and the proscenium arch. Also found in its lobby is a mural entitled "Rising Philippines" done by Victorio C. Edades, Carlos V. Francisco and Galo B. Ocampo. The theme also is evident in the proscenium arch, featuring sampaguita flowers in bloom finished in white seashell. Four concentric circles of short bamboo nodes and internodes radiate from the sampaguita flowers.

The theater accommodates 1,100 seats in its air-conditioned double-balcony interior.

== Damage and decay ==
The theater closed because of the declining theater business in Manila. The beginning of the Light Rail Transit (LRT) construction caused the theater-goers to choose cinema theaters inside the newly opened air-conditioned malls.

== Demolition ==
The theater was demolished in June 2020 to make way for a new high-rise building.
