= Philippine National Bank Building (Escolta) =

Historic office building in Manila, Philippines

- The PNB Building in 2014

General information
- Location: Escolta, Manila, Philippines
- Construction started: 1962
- Completed: 1965
- Inaugurated: 1966
- Demolished: 2016
- Owner: Philippine National Bank (until 1996); Manila City Government (1996–2016)

Technical details
- Floor count: 12

The old Philippine National Bank (PNB) Building was a former office building along Escolta Street in Manila, Philippines.

== History ==
The PNB Building was constructed from 1962 to 1965 and was inaugurated in 1966 by its namesake and tenant, the then-state owned Philippine National Bank (PNB). It was built on the former site of the Crystal Arcade.

PNB occupied the building until 1996 when the banking firm was privatized. It then moved its headquarters to Pasay sharing a lot in the Financial Center estate with Philippine Airlines. The PNB was the main government finance body prior to the establishment of the Bangko Sentral ng Pilipinas, the Philippines' central bank. The building housed the City College of Manila before it was abandoned.

In January 2015, the building sustained damages from a fire which led to the owner of the building, the Manila City Government to have it demolished.

== Architecture and design ==
The architect of the PNB Bank is Carlos Arguelles with David Consunji as the building's contractor. The architectural style of the building is considered to be that of the International Style which is described to have complemented the climate and context of its immediate vicinity, the Escolta area, according to architect Dominic Galicia, president of the Philippine office of the International Council on Monuments and Sites. The building is 12-storeys high.

== Demolition ==
Following the 2015 fire, the Manila City Government under the administration of Manila Mayor Joseph Estrada decided to demolish the building after it deemed the building structurally unsound. The building's demolition was earlier proposed in 2010 under Estrada's predecessor Alfredo Lim after Romy Lorenzo of Geltd Developers and Managers Group Inc., a developer claimed that the PNB Building is at a risk of collapse should an earthquake strike the city. The demolition was condemned by heritage conservationists, since the PNB Building is presumed to be an Important Cultural Property under the National Cultural Heritage Act and has suggested to retrofit the building instead.
