= Lizares Mansion =

Heritage house in Iloilo City, Philippines

Coordinates: 10°43′55″N 122°33′31″E

- Villa Lizares (Spanish)
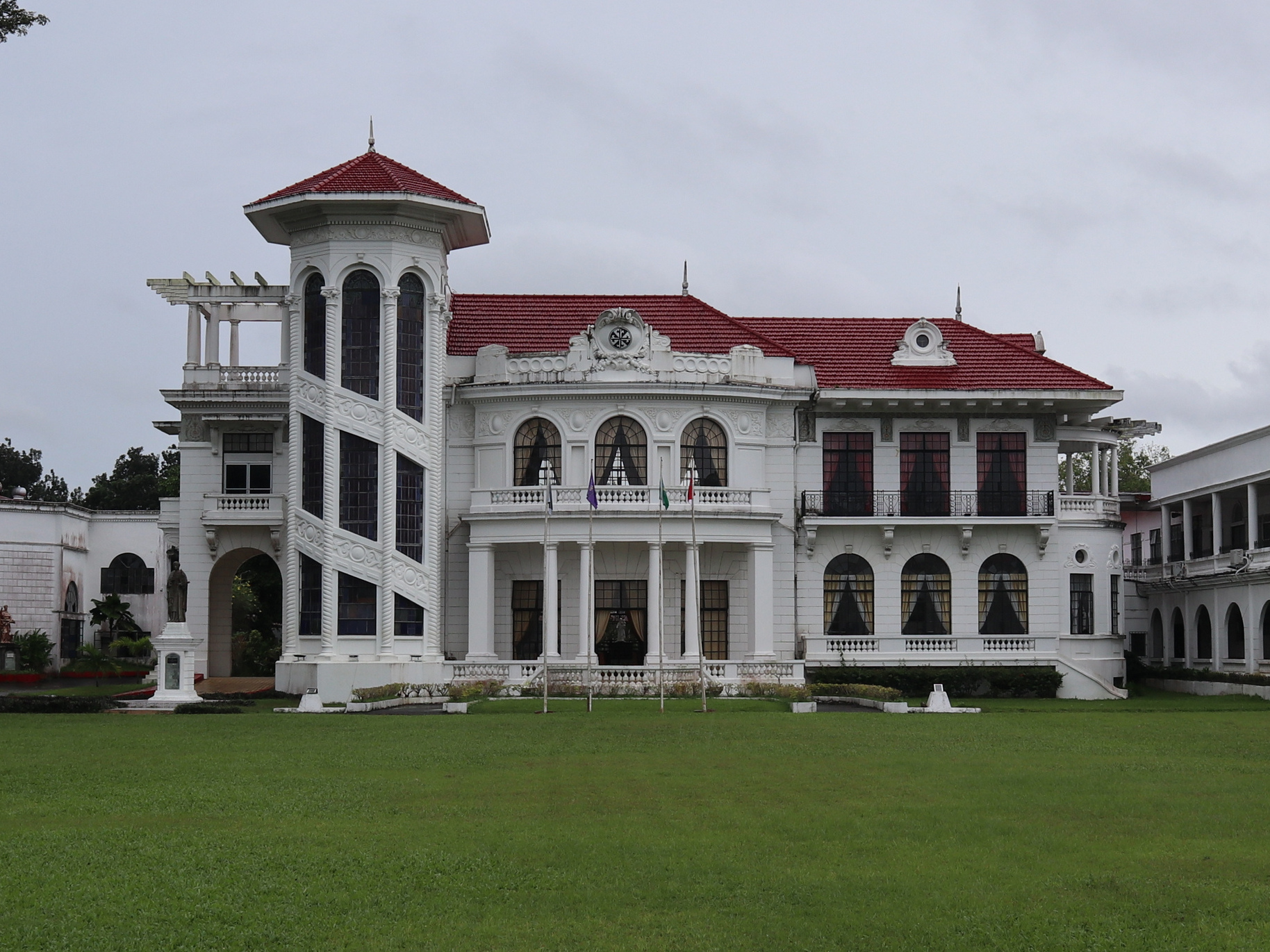
- Interactive map of the Lizares Mansion area
- Alternative names: Lizares–Gamboa Mansion

General information
- Architectural style: Beaux-Arts
- Location: Jaro, Angelicum School, MacArthur Highway, Iloilo City, Philippines
- Completed: 1937
- Owner: Angelicum School Iloilo

Technical details
- Floor count: 3

Design and construction
- Architect: Andrés Luna de San Pedro

The Lizares–Gamboa Mansion, also known as Lizares Mansion or Villa Lizares, is a Beaux-Arts heritage house located in the district of Jaro in Iloilo City, Philippines. Built in 1937, it now serves as the chapel of Angelicum School Iloilo.

In 2024, the Lizares Mansion was declared an Important Cultural Property by the National Museum of the Philippines (NMP).

== History ==
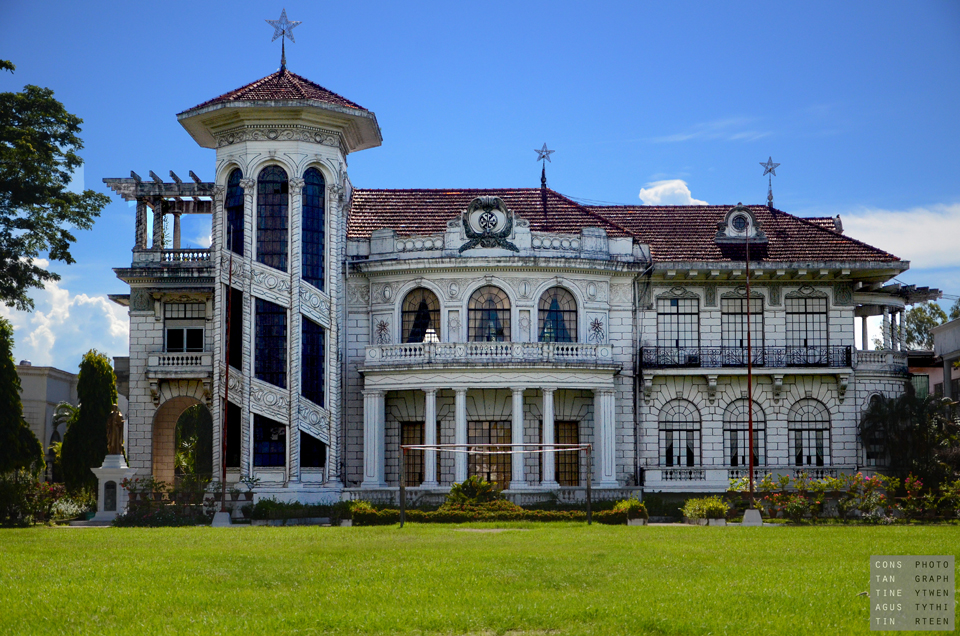
Lizares Mansion in 2013, before it was repainted and whitewashed in 2018

The Lizares Mansion, built in 1937, was a gift from Don Emiliano Lizares to his wife, Conchita Gamboa, and their two sons and three daughters. It was designed by Andres Luna de San Pedro, the son of famous Filipino painter Juan Luna. The mansion has three floors, a basement, and an attic. It features a winding wooden staircase, large bedrooms with floors and 59 doors made of hardwood.

When World War II broke out, the Lizares family left for a safe hiding place in Pototan, Iloilo. The mansion was then used as the headquarters of the Japanese army. During the Japanese occupation, Filipino soldiers were tortured within its walls, and their bodies were disposed of on the estate grounds, with the basement believed to be a dumping ground for tortured Filipinos. Some accounts suggest the family used a network of underground tunnels during their escape, one of which reportedly led to Iloilo Memorial Park.

As the liberation of Panay approached, Japanese soldiers in the mansion committed seppuku. Locals believe that the spirits of those who died during this period still haunt the mansion.

After the war, the Lizares family returned to live in the mansion, but life was never the same. In 1950, Don Emiliano Lizares died, and his widow left for Manila, leasing the mansion to a businessman who turned it into a casino. The city mayor later ordered the casino closed, claiming it corrupted the locals. The mansion was then left in the care of Tio Doroy Finolan and his wife, who kept it intact.

In 1962, the Lizares Mansion was sold to the Dominicans. In 1963, it was converted into a House of Formation for young Dominicans in the Philippines. By 1978, the Lizares Mansion compound had become the home of Angelicum School Iloilo with the help of the University of Santo Tomas (UST).

In 2024, the Lizares Mansion was declared an Important Cultural Property by the National Museum of the Philippines (NMP).

== In popular culture ==
Lizares Mansion has been featured in several Philippine television dramas. It was a notable location in the Philippine remake of the 2005 South Korean television drama "A Love to Kill," which premiered on Netflix in 2022, starring Ian Veneracion. The mansion also appeared in ABS-CBN's "The Iron Heart," starring Richard Gutierrez, which premiered in November 2022.

In 2024, the mansion was seen as the principal photography location for the Philippine adaptation of "It's Okay to Not Be Okay," starring Carlo Aquino, Joshua Garcia, and Anne Curtis.

== See also ==
- Angelicum School Iloilo
