= Crystal Arcade =

Former commercial building in Manila

- Alternative names: Arcache Arcade

General information
- Architectural style: Streamline Moderne
- Construction started: 1920s
- Inaugurated: June 1, 1932
- Demolished: on or before 1962
- Cost: ₱1.5 million
- Owner: El Hogar Filipino

Technical details
- Floor count: 3
- Floor area: 2,875 m^{2} (30,950 sq ft)

Design and construction
- Architect: Andrés Luna de San Pedro

The Crystal Arcade was a commercial building along Escolta Street, in Manila, Philippines.

== History ==
=== Construction ===
The construction of the Crystal Arcade began in the 1920s on land owned by the building on the Pardo de Taveras family. However, due to mounting costs, the owners ceded ownership of their Escolta properties including the Crystal Arcade to the lending El Hogar Filipino in 1931. The building costed ₱1.5 million to build. The building was inaugurated on June 1, 1932, with less storeys than initially planned.

Nevertheless, the Crystal Arcade functioned as a shopping mall for high society. It was also considered as most modern building in the Philippines at the time.

=== World War II ===
The Crystal Arcade during World War II housed the Japanese-sponsored agencies like the Japanese Government Railways and the Board of Tourist Industry. It sustained damage during the Battle of Manila in 1945 which ended the Japanese occupation of the city.

=== Decline and demolition ===
After World War II, the Crystal Arcade still accommodated some stores on its first floor with its second floor reduced as a storage space. It was already dilipitated by the 1960s. Eventually it was demolished, and the Philippine National Bank Building was erected in its place.

== Architecture and design ==
The Crystal Arcade had Andrés Luna de San Pedro as its architect, who is a relative of the Pardo de Taveras, the site's original owners. The building is an example of Streamline Moderne architecture, with Luna drawing inspiration from The Crystal Palace of London.

The building at the coerner of Escolta and San Vicente Streets, was three-storeys high, with a basement, and occupyied an area of 2,875 square meters (30,950 sq ft). There were plans to erect the Crystal Arcade as a seven-storey structure with a ten-storey central tower. In its heyday, the building has an installed air-conditioning system.
