= Burke Building (Manila) =

Historic Building in Manila, Philippines

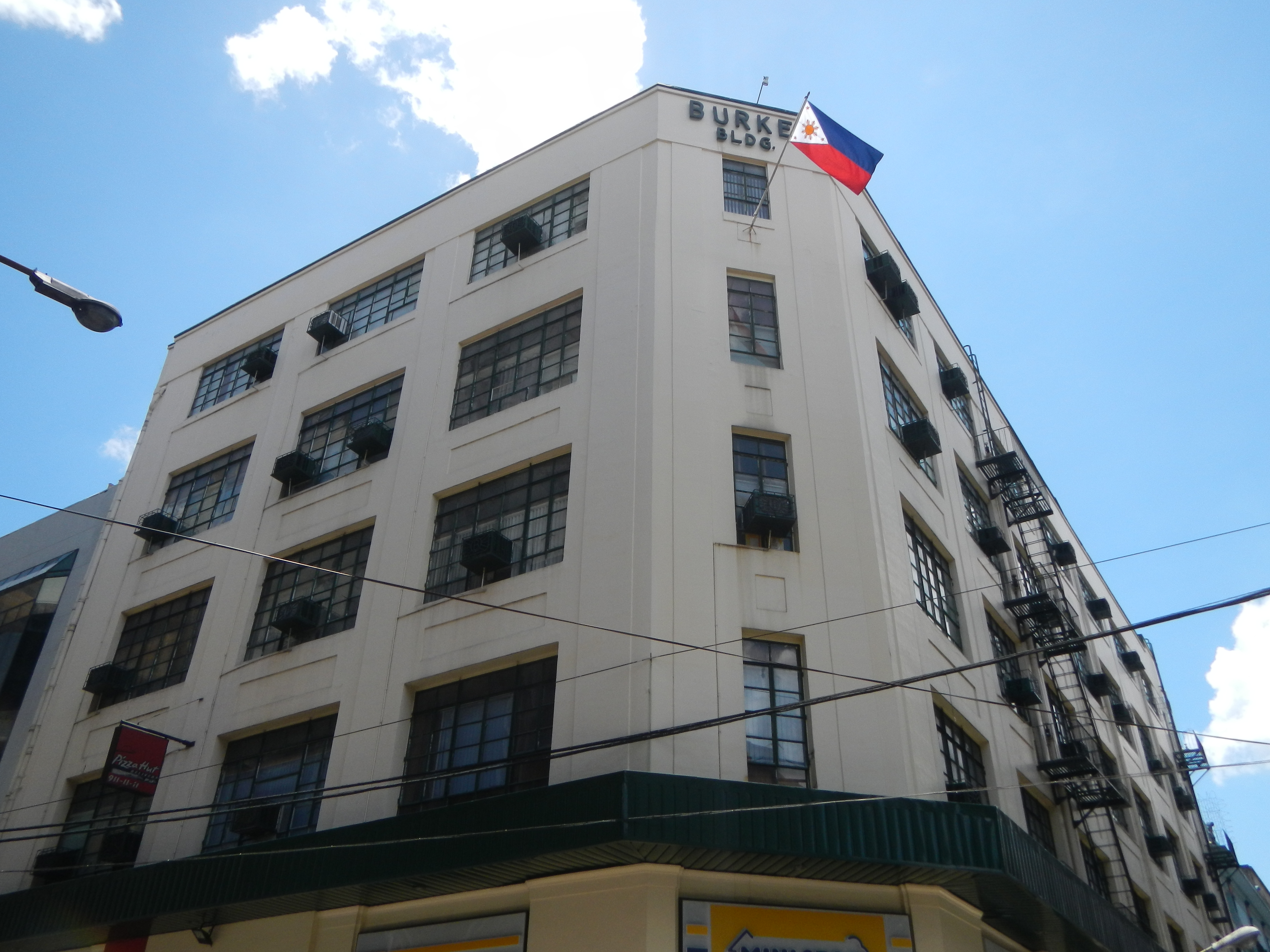
- The facade of Burke Building along Escolta Street
- Interactive map of the Burke Building area

General information
- Status: Completed
- Location: Escolta Street, Binondo, Manila, Philippines
- Coordinates: 14°35′55″N 120°58′45″E
- Named for: William J. Burke
- Completed: 1919

Burke Building is a historic building along Escolta corner Burke, Binondo, Manila, Philippines. First built in 1919, it survived World War II and has gone major remodeling since. Named after cardiologist William J. Burke, the building is also known as the location of the first elevator in Manila.
