= Commercial Bank and Trust Company Building =

- Gusali ng Commercial Bank and Trust Company (Filipino)
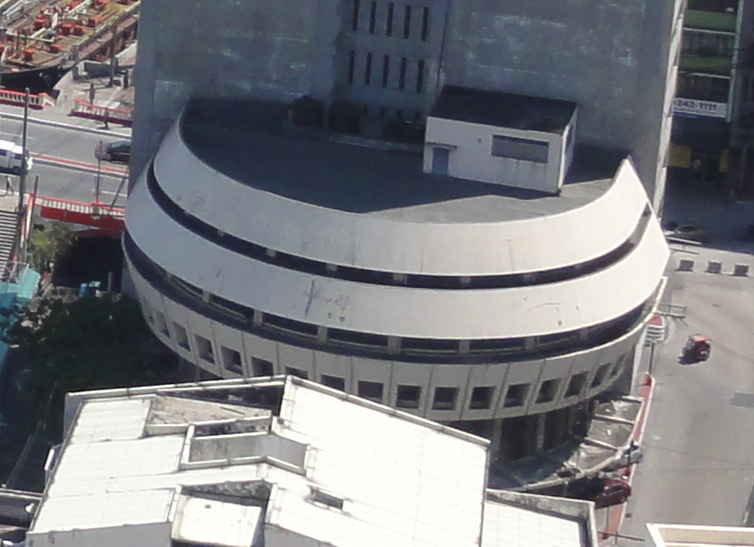
- Interactive map of the Commercial Bank and Trust Company Building area

General information
- Architectural style: Brutalist
- Location: Escolta Cor. Yuchengco Streets, Binondo, Manila, Philippines
- Coordinates: 14°35′48″N 120°58′38″E
- Current tenants: BPI Escolta branch
- Completed: 1969
- Owner: Bank of the Philippine Islands

Design and construction
- Architect: José María Zaragoza
- Designations: Important Cultural Property (June 27, 2019)

The Commercial Bank and Trust Company (Comtrust) Building is a historic building along Escolta and Yuchengco Streets in Binondo, Manila, Philippines. It houses the Escolta branch of the Bank of the Philippine Islands (BPI).

== History ==
The Commercial Bank and Trust Company (Comtrust) Building as its name suggest was initially hold office for commercial banking firm Comtrust shortly after it was built in 1969. In 1981, Comtrust would merge with the Bank of the Philippine Islands (BPI) and consequentially BPI became the building's new tenant. The building would house the BPI Escolta branch.

On June 27, 2019, the building was recognized as an Important Cultural Property by the National Museum of the Philippines. A marker stating the recognition would be unveiled on August 30, 2023.

== Architecture and design ==
The Comtrust Building was designed by Filipino architect José María Zaragoza. The semi-dome building exhibits a Brutalist style of architecture.
