= Andrés Luna de San Pedro =

Filipino architect

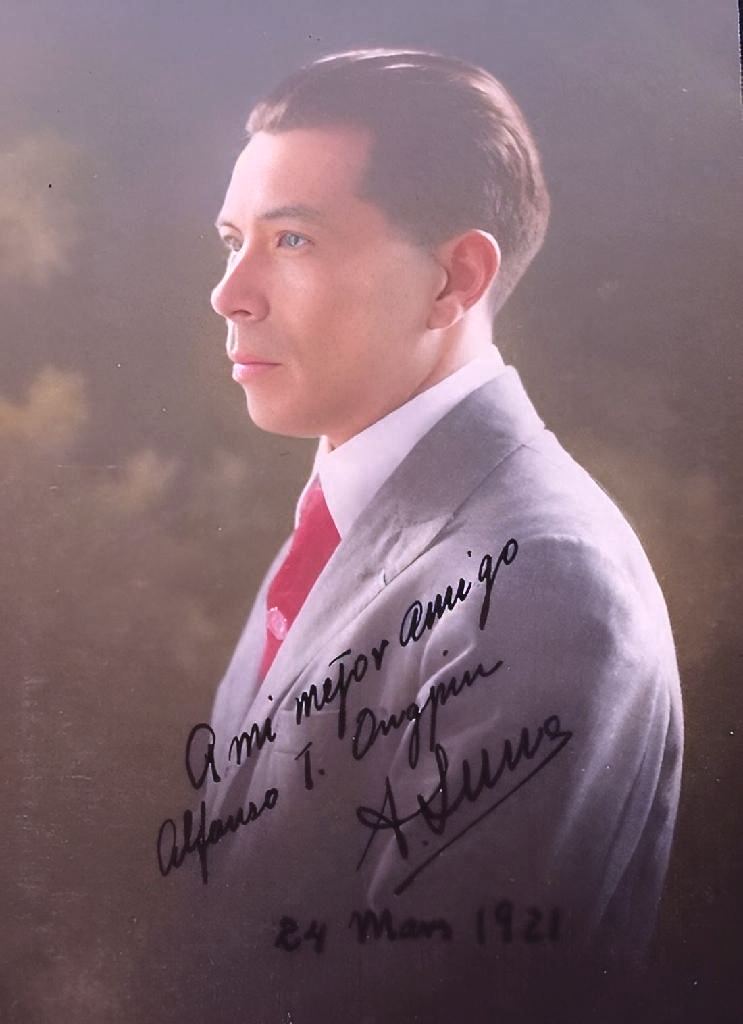
- Born: Andrés Julián Joaquín Omer Luna de San Pedro y Pardo de Tavera; September 9, 1887; Paris, France
- Died: January 22, 1952 (aged 64); Manila, Philippines
- Other name: Lulín
- Citizenship: Spaniard, French, American (1899-1946), Philippine
- Occupation: Architect
- Spouse: Grace McRae
- Parent(s): Juan Luna de San Pedro y Novicio, María de la Paz Pardo de Tavera y Gorricho
- Practice: Architect
- Buildings: Legarda Elementary School; First United Building; Crystal Arcade; Alfonso Zobel Mansion

Andrés Luna y Pardo de Tavera FPIA (September 9, 1887 – January 22, 1952) was a French-Hispano Filipino architect who built the first air-conditioned building in the Philippines, the Crystal Arcade which was the seat of the pre-war Manila Stock Exchange (previous site of Paseo de Escolta and now present site of City College of Manila-Escolta Building, demolished in 2016) that was once located on No. 71 Escolta Street, Binondo, Manila. He was assigned as the city architect of the City of Manila from 1920 to 1924. Some of his buildings were lost during World War II.

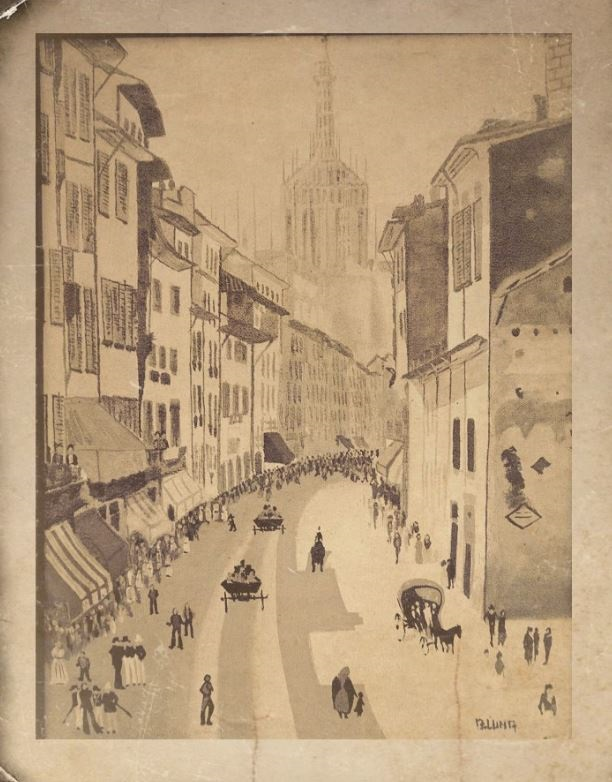
European city

== Life and career ==
Andres Luna de San Pedro y Pardo de Tavera was born on September 9, 1887, in Paris, France. His parents are Juan Luna de San Pedro y Novicio and María de la Paz Pardo de Tavera y Gorricho. He is also a nephew of Don Trinidad H. Pardo de Tavera.

Luna grew up in Paris until the age of six, when his father shot Luna's mother, Paz, and Lunas maternal grandmother, Doña Juliana Gorricho, on September 22, 1892. Lunas father had frequently accused Paz of committing adultery in the time leading up to the killing. On February 8, 1893, Luna's father was acquitted by a French court, on the grounds that it had been a crime of passion. He subsequently left Paris together with Luna. After spending six months in Barcelona and Paris, they travelled by boat along with his uncle, Gen. Antonio N. Luna to Manila on May 24, 1894.

Luna was taught art lessons by Miguel Zaragoza, and subsequently Ramon Santa Coloma and Lorenzo Guerrero. In Japan, he studied ceramics, followed by studying architecture at the International Correspondence School, where he earned his diploma in 1911. Later while he stayed in France, he studied at the École des Beaux-Arts. Upon return to the Philippines, he served as the architect of the City of Manila from 1920 to 1924. In 1938, he became a member of the Manila Beautiful Committee which was created for the beautification of the city. Throughout his career, Luna gained recognition for his works, including the St. Louis Exposition and the Philippine Institute of Architects.

He died on January 22, 1952, at the age of 64. He was survived by his American wife, Grace, who later migrated back to the United States after his death.

== Works ==
- Regina Building
- Natalio Enriquez Ancestral House in Sariaya, Quezon, 1931
- Legarda Elementary School, 1922
- El Nido Mansion (Eugene Arthur (E.A.) Perkins Residence), 1925 "Manila's Most Beautiful Home of 1928"
- First United Building, 1928
- Crystal Arcade, 1932
- Alfonso Zobel Mansion
- Jose Ma. Basa Jr. Mansion on Lepanto Street
- Manila Hotel, (renovated in 1935)
- St. Cecilia's Hall, St. Scholastica's College, 1932
- Lizares Mansion in Jaro, Iloilo City, 1937
- Chapel of the Crucified Christ, St. Paul University Manila, 1927
