= First United Building =

Historic building in Manila, Philippines

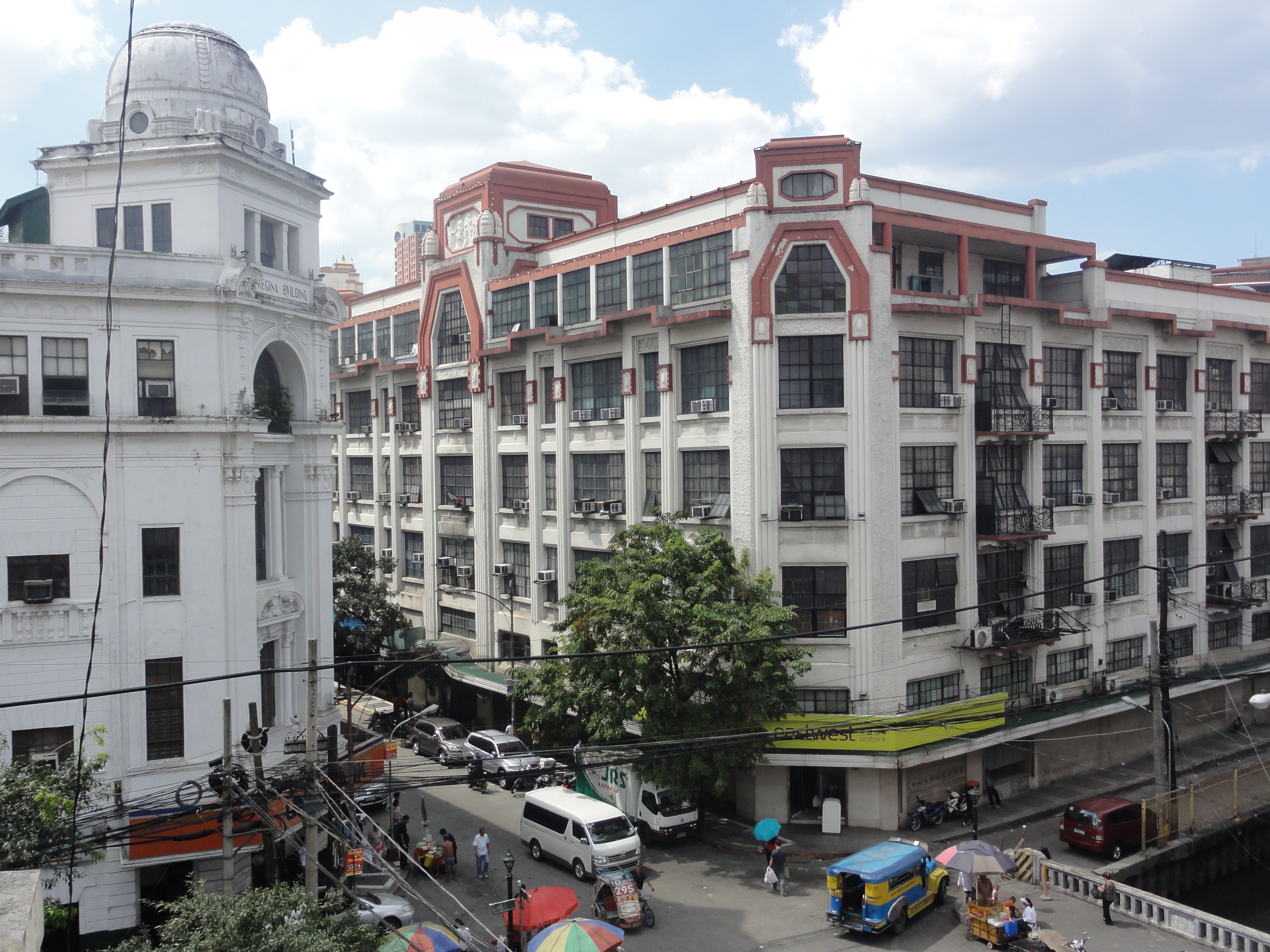
- Facade of First United Building (right)

- Location within Manila Location within Metro Manila Location within Luzon Location within Philippines
- Alternative names: Perez-Samanillo Building

General information
- Status: Completed
- Type: Commercial
- Architectural style: Art deco
- Location: 413 Escolta Street, Binondo, Manila, Philippines
- Coordinates: 14°35′55″N 120°58′46″E
- Completed: 1928
- Owner: Sylianteng family United Coconut Planters Bank; Tanco family

Design and construction
- Architect: Andres P. Luna, FPIA

The First United Building, formerly known and still commonly referred to as Perez-Samanillo Building, is an Art Deco building on Escolta Street in Binondo, Manila, Philippines. It was designed by Andrés P. Luna, the son of renowned painter Juan N. Luna, and was the tallest building in Manila when it was completed in 1928.

== History ==
=== Early years ===
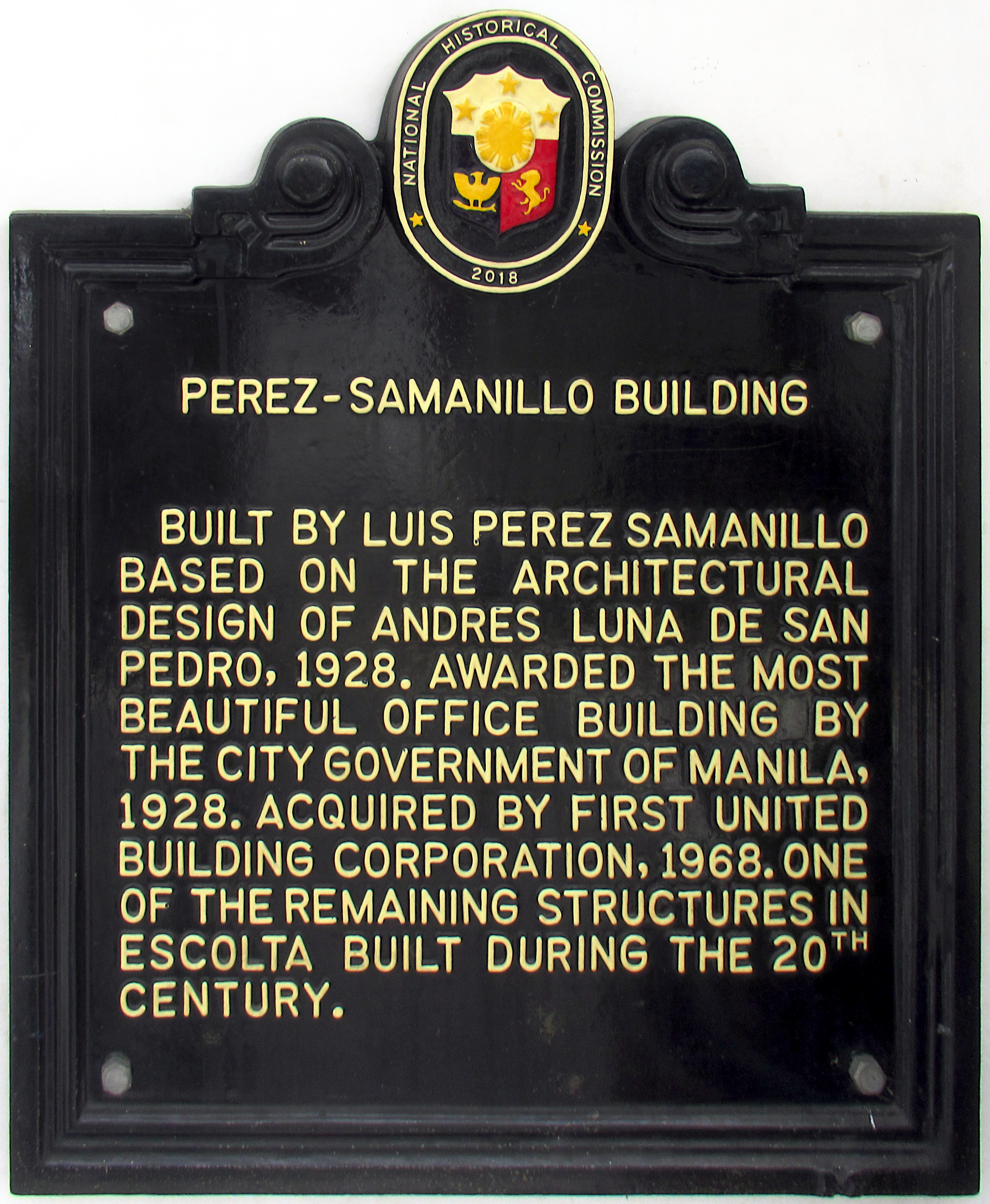
Historical marker installed in 2018

The First United Building, alternatively known as the Perez–Samanillo Building was built in 1928 for Luis Perez Samanillo at the time when Escolta was considered a financial center. The Erlanger & Galinger, and Hale Shoe Company moved in to the building in February 1928, and was followed by leather goods store Riu Hermanos. In 1936, Berg's Department Store set up shop on the building's ground floor. The Perez–Samanillo Building also hosted diplomatic missions with the consulates of France and Panama becoming tenants of the building in 1933.

The building was left significantly damaged following the aftermath of World War II but was later repaired. In 1951, Chinese businessman Sy Lian Teng of the Sylianteng family bought Berg's from its original German owner, Ernest Berg.

=== First United Building ===
The Perez–Samanillo Building was put on sale around 1964 It was bought by José Cojuangco, who owns United Bank a tenant of the building, in 1968. The Cojuangcos held the building for 11 years. In 1979 the parts of the building was acquired by Danding Cojuangco and the Sylianteng family.

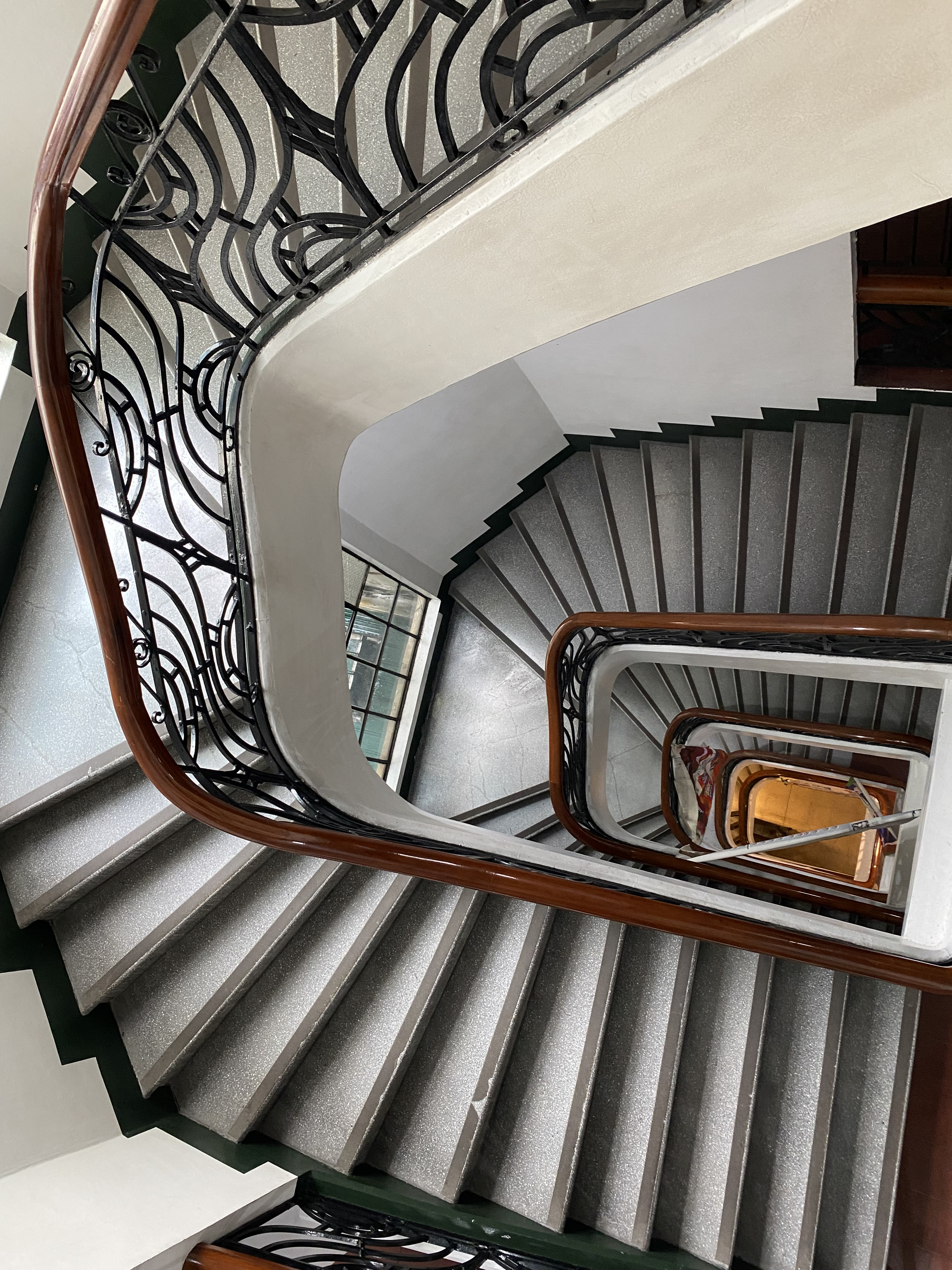
Interior stairwell

In the 1970s to the 1980s, the building hosted various film production studios namely RVQ Productions of comedian Dolphy (1974–2012), Nora Villamor (NV) Productions of actress and producer Nora Aunor (1973–1985), GC Films which is associated with Rolando and Gabby Concepcion (1982-1984), and Essex Films of Danny Zialcita. Berg's Department Store, a main landmark in Escolta, closed sometime in 1982.

The Syliantengs made a conscious effort to maintain the building through an "adaptive reuse" approach. The First United Building Community Museum was established to honor the wish of Sy Lian Teng, the family patriarch, to set up a museum using his collection of old photos and other archival materials. The museum opened in May 2015. It features Escolta's history as a major shopping and financial district in Manila.

A year later, HUB: Make Lab, an incubator for creative startups akin to the Chelsea Market along with Fred's Revolucion, an artist-run bar and The Den Coffee & Contemporary Culture, a coffee shop and a space for contemporary artists, all opened in 2016 after the successful efforts by the Escolta Commercial Association Inc. to revive the street along with the bi-monthly Escolta Block Party. Their operations was disrupted during the COVID-19 pandemic in 2020 but since then, HUB: Make Lab and its sister tenants, has since then resumed operations.

== Architecture ==
The First United Building was designed by Andres P. Luna with a rectangular plan. On the main facade is a central tower flanked by two chamfered corner towers on both ends of the building. The three towers have the same ornamental treatments of thin cylindrical moldings running up to the square plates and continued by beveled arches that relate to the windows at the sixth floor. There are octagonal windows flanked by stout finials above the arches. A pergola with protruding rafters originating from the girder connected the bevels. The central tower which contains the main entrance of the building has a rigid arch and capped by elongated octagons that bordered a display. The parapet on the topmost part has floral arrangement on an urn with equally distant low-relief medallions. The main entrance is located below the central tower which leads to the elevator and the stairwell. The side towers are both cut in the corners to open up the intersection.

=== Malasakit Gran Prix Award ===
In June, the restored FUB won the Malasakit Gran Prix Award, at the 2024 Good Design Philippines. Robert Sylianteng, owner and President with wife Lorraine accepted the highest prize from Department of Trade and Industry's Design Center of the Philippines' Mylene Abiva.
