= Angelicum School Iloilo =

Roman Catholic school in Iloilo City, Philippines

- Motto: Caritas, Justitia, et Fortitudo (Latin)
- Motto in English: Charity, Justice, and Fortitude
- Type: Private, Roman Catholic, Dominican, Non-graded Non-profit Coeducational Basic education institution
- Established: 1978; 48 years ago
- Founders: Rev.Fr.Rogelio B. Alarcon, OP
- Religious affiliation: Roman Catholic (Dominicans)
- Academic affiliations: DOMNET
- Director: Fr.Honorato C.Castigador, OP
- Location: McArthur Drive, Tabuc Suba, Jaro, Iloilo City, Philippines; 10°43′54″N 122°33′32″E
- Campus: Urban, 1.65 ha (16,500 m^{2})
- Colors: Blue - Gold - Black
- Mascot: Blue Owl
- Website: www.angelicum.edu.ph
- Location within Visayas Location within Philippines

Angelicum School Iloilo is a private, Catholic school run by the Philippine Province of the Order of Preachers in Jaro, Iloilo City, Philippines. It is one of the three Angelicum Schools established by Fr. Rogelio B. Alarcon, O.P. in the 1970s that pioneered a non-graded, open-classroom education system in the Philippines. The school is also known for the Lizares Mansion, former heritage house turned school building, which stands in the school's campus. It is one of Iloilo's imposing landmarks. The school grounds and the mansion light up during the Christmas season with a grand opening called "Daigon Slash Sigaboom."

== History ==
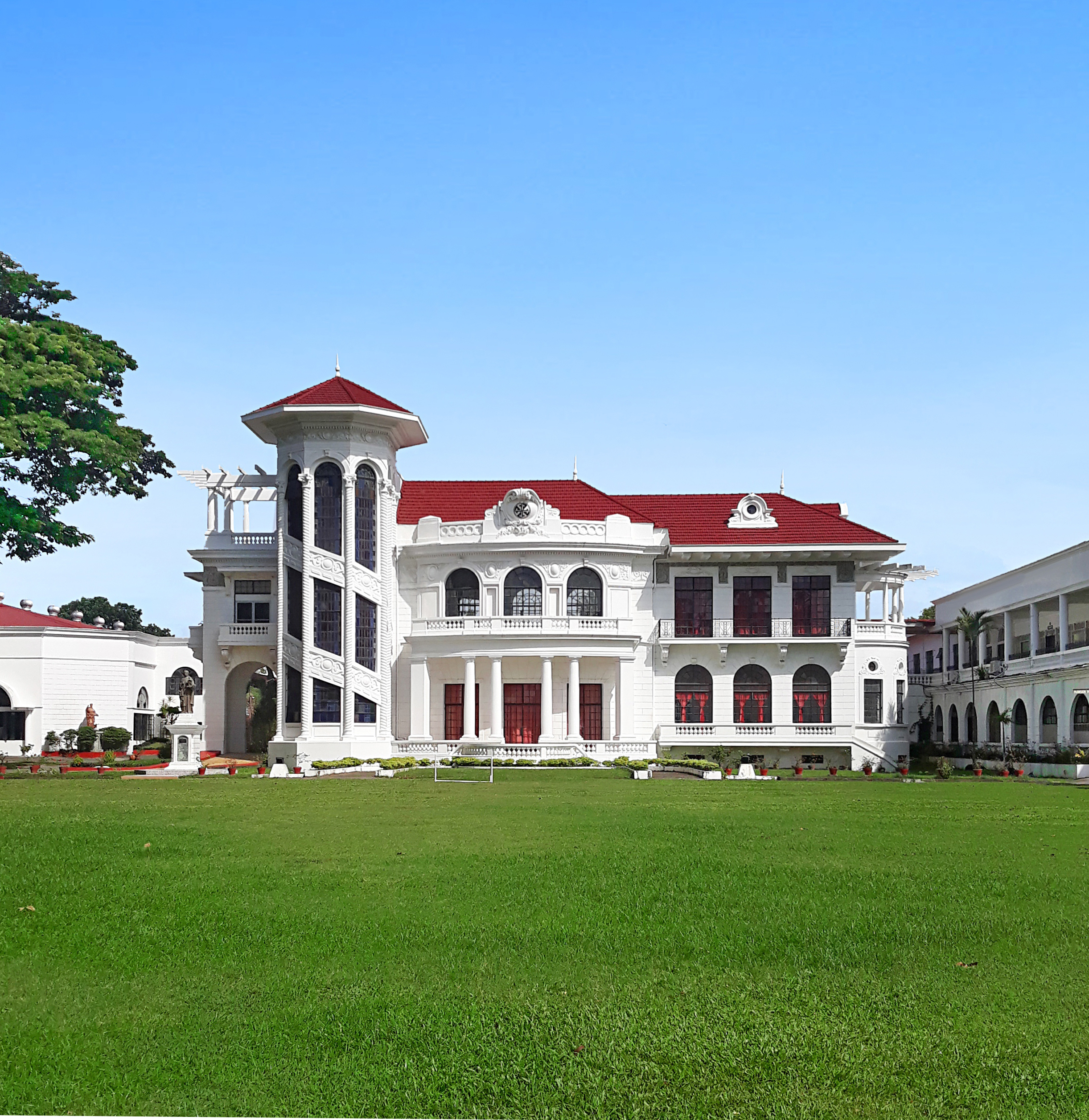
Lizares Mansion serves as Angelicum School Iloilo's chapel.

The concept of a school catering to the individual needs of each learner was on the mind of Fr. Rogelio B. Alarcon, O.P. when he was a student of Colegio de San Juan de Letran in Manila. In 1972, he (then the first Prior Provincial of the Dominican Province of the Philippines) was able to convince some educators and the Provincial Council to establish a non-graded school. It was to be called Angelicum after one of the Dominican houses of studies in Rome and in honor of the Dominican Angelic Doctor of the Church St. Thomas Aquinas, the Universal Patron Saint of Catholic schools.

The first Angelicum School (now Angelicum College) was founded in Quezon City in 1972. The second was established in Teheran, Iran in 1974 and was later closed when war broke out. In 1978, Angelicum School Iloilo was opened with 70-plus students and four teaching staff.

Angelicum School Iloilo, which occupies the Lizares Mansion compound, has an area of 16,500 square meters along McArthur Drive, Tabuc Suba, Jaro, Iloilo City. The mansion, which is a mixture of American and Spanish architecture, is one of the most elegant structures in Iloilo.

Built in 1937 by Don Emiliano Lizares for his wife Concepcion Gamboa and their two sons and three daughters, the mansion has three floors, a basement and an attic. It has a winding wooden staircase and big bedrooms with floor and doors made of hardwood. It has 59 doors which indicate the intricacy of its layout.

When World War II broke out, the family left for a safe hiding place in Pototan, Iloilo. The mansion was then used as headquarters of the Japanese army. It was believed that the basement became a dumping ground for tortured Filipinos.

After the war, the family went back to live in the mansion, but life was never the same. In 1950, Don Emiliano Lizares died and his widow left for Manila, leasing the mansion to a businessman who turned it into a casino. The city mayor later ordered that the casino be closed, claiming that it corrupted the Ilonggos. After that, the mansion was left to the hands of a caretaker Tio Doroy Finolan who, with his wife, kept it intact.

In 1962 the Lizares Mansion was sold to the Dominicans. In 1963, it was converted into a House of Formation for young Dominicans in the Philippines.

In 1978, the Lizares Mansion compound became the home of Angelicum School Iloilo.

In 2024, the Lizares Mansion was declared as an Important Cultural Property by the National Museum of the Philippines (NMP).

== Integration ==
During the 10th Chapter of the Dominican Province of the Philippines (DPP) in April 2012, a proposal to integrate all schools run by the Dominicans in the Philippines was approved. The 123rd act of the 10th provincial chapter states: “We ordain that the DPP move towards integrating all existing educational institutions of the [Philippine Dominican] Province within the two venerable and historical educational institutions, that of Letran (1620) and UST (1611) in the event that UST is transferred to the jurisdiction of the Province.

Todate, two Dominican schools (Aquinas University of Legazpi and Angelicum College) have been integrated with UST. With the integration, the two schools have been renamed UST - Legazpi and UST Angelicum College.

The integration of Angelicum College - Quezon City is presently being evaluated and if integration results are positive, Angelicum - Iloilo will follow. It will be renamed UST - Iloilo.

== School seal ==
The official seal of Angelicum School Iloilo is made up of two circles with the outer enclosing the inner circle. The upper half of the outer circle bursts with the words "angelicum school iloilo" in gold letters using Old English type. The lower half of the outer circle carries the words "ILOILO CITY" and the institution's foundation year “1978” also in gold letters using Arial type. Its background color is royal blue.

The inner circle encloses a multi-ray sun above an escutcheon and a banner. The background color of the inner circle is sky blue. The multi-ray sun, rendered in gold, is symbolic of St. Thomas Aquinas, Doctor of the Church and patron saint of Angelicum School Iloilo and of all Catholic institutions in the world.

The upper part of the escutcheon is a white rectangular area which carries a white open book outlined in red. On the open book, the Latin word "VERITAS" is inscribed in red Arial type. The book is set between the symbols of Greek letters alpha and omega, also rendered in red.

The open book inscribed with the word VERITAS represents the quest for excellence especially in the search for the truth, which is Jesus Christ, just as all knowledge should begin and end in God — the alpha and the omega.

The Blessed Virgin Mary's intercession is dutifully invoked in setting the symbols and inscriptions amid the Marian color since Angelicum School Iloilo is devoted to her, thus the sky blue background color of the inner circle.

The lower part of the escutcheon, which is the largest, is the black-and-white Dominican cross and shield representing the Order of Preachers which established the school and whose charism and zeal for the Truth are deeply ingrained and manifested in the school's activities as well as in its vision, mission statement, philosophy and objectives. It is a reflection of the Dominicans’ full and unqualified support for Angelicum Iloilo School's search for truth. The white and black colors represent purity and sacrifice, respectively.

== Directors ==
- Rev. Fr. Rogelio B. Alarcon, O.P., 1978–1979
- Rev. Fr. Thomas L. Francisco, O.P., 1979–1980
- +Rev. Fr. Amador B. Ambat, O.P., 1980–1984
- +Rev. Fr. Edmundo A. Espinas, O.P., 1984–1987
- Rev. Fr. Jesse M. Lorete, O.P., 1987–1988
- Rev. Fr. Roberto G. Reyes, O.P., 1988–1989
- Rev. Fr. Joseph R. Raquid, O.P., 1989–1990
- Rev. Fr. Juan V. Ponce, O.P., 1990–1997
- +Bro. Nelson C. Taclobos, O.P., 1997–2001
- Nancy Delicana, 2001–2006
- Sr. Ma. Vigilia Rivero, O.P., 2006–2008
- Rev. Fr. Rafael Lusuegro, O.P., 2008–2011
- Rev. Fr. Lauro G. de Dios, O.P, 2011–2015
- Rev. Fr. Ramon Claro G. Mendez, O.P., PhD, 2015–2019
- Rev. Fr. Maximo P. Gatela, O.P., 2019–2021
- Rev. Fr. Honorato C. Castigador, O.P., 2021–present

== Principals ==
- Ms. Susana Palces-Triunfante, 1978–1985
- Rev. Fr. Ramon Cercado, O.P., 1985–1987
- Rev. Fr. Jesse M. Lorete, O.P., 1987–1988
- Rev. Fr. Roberto G. Reyes, O.P., 1988–1989
- Rev. Fr. Joseph R. Raquid, O.P., 1989–1990
- Rev. Fr. Juan V. Ponce, O.P., 1990–1997
- Bro. Nelson C. Taclobos, O.P., 1997–1998
- Sr. Ma. Felicitas Macsera, O.P., 1998–1999
- Rev. Fr. Norberto Castillo, O.P., 1999–2001
- Ms. Nancy Delicana, 2001–2006
- Sr. Ma. Virgilia Rivero, O.P., 2006–2008
- Rev. Fr. Rafael B. Lusuegro, O.P., 2008–2011.
- Rev. Fr. Lauro G. de Dios, O.P, 2011–2015
- Ms. Elisa N. Bustamante 2015-2016
- Rev. Fr. Paul Reagan O. Talavera, O.P., 2016–2019
- Rev. Fr. Maximo P. Gatela O.P., 2019–2021
- Rev. Fr. John Stephen P. Besa, O.P., 2021-2024
- Rev. Fr. Paul Lovell Javier, O.P., LPT, MSM, 2024–Present

== Tourism ==
During the term of Rev. Fr. Juan V. Ponce, O.P., the facade of the mansion was dressed with lights during the Christmas season. It was flocked to by tourists and has become a yearly tradition of the school.

In 2006, the Angelicum mansion was included in the Iloilo Heritage Sites by the Iloilo City Cultural Heritage Conservation Society. It was cited for its Romanesque style architecture.

== Notable alumni ==
- Myrtle Gail Sarrosa (HS 2011, Elem 2007), Pinoy Big Brother: Teen Edition 4 Big Winner
- Philip Stanley Amigo Palisada (HS 1985), news anchor, Dateline Philippines Sunday, ABS-CBN News Channel
- Rodolfo Yap, Jr (HS 1983), Australian-based actor, professional fitness trainer and photographer
- Gynnyn Gumban (HS 1992), municipal councilor, Municipality of Pavia
- Luis Gonzalo Pelayo (Elem 1997 & HS 2001) - 9th place December 2005 Nursing Licensure Examination
- Varsolo Sunio (Elem 1998), Summa Cum Laude, BS in physics with Computer Engineering, AdMU
