= Escolta Street =

Historic street in Manila, Philippines

Coordinates: 14°35′52″N 120°58′43″E

- Calle de la Escolta
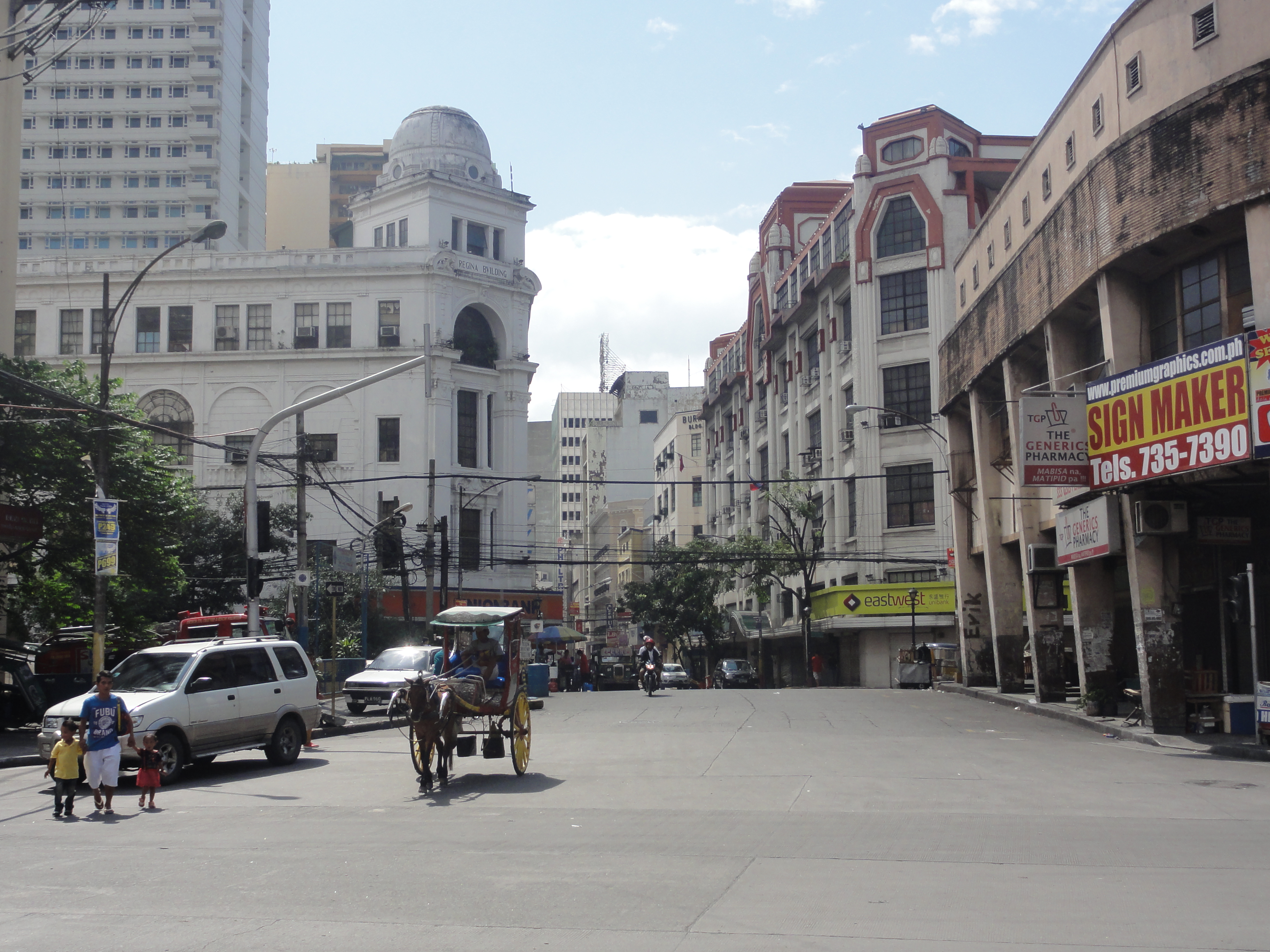
- Escolta Street, looking west from Plaza Santa Cruz
- Interactive map of Escolta Street
- Length: 0.5 km (0.31 mi); Based on Google Maps
- Location: Manila
- East end: N150 (Plaza Santa Cruz Road) in Santa Cruz
- Major junctions: Burke Street; Tomas Pinpin Street; Yuchengco Street
- West end: Quintin Paredes Road in Binondo

Construction
- Completion: 1594

Escolta Street (Spanish: Calle de la Escolta) is a historic east–west street in the old downtown district of Binondo in Manila, Philippines. It runs parallel to the Pasig River from Quintin Paredes Road (Plaza Moraga) to Plaza Santa Cruz Road (Plaza Lacson). The street is home to several fine examples of early skyscraper design in the Philippines.

Its definition as a historic financial district includes Escolta and other surrounding streets of Binondo and Santa Cruz. It currently carries one-way eastbound traffic towards Santa Cruz.

== History ==
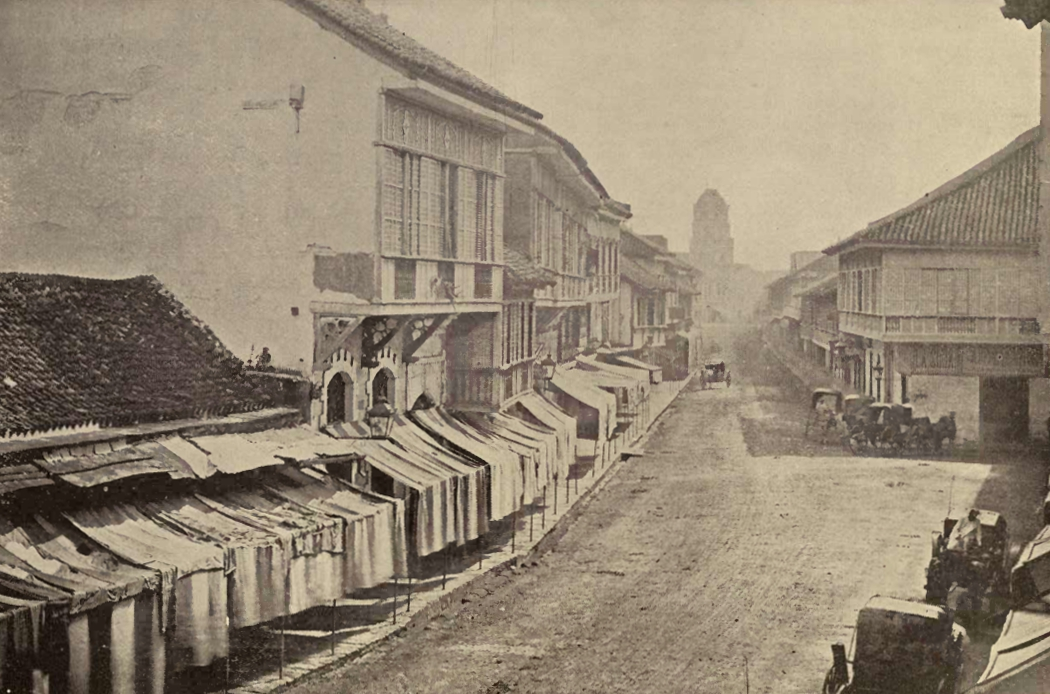
The Escolta, the "Broadway of Manila", circa 1899

Escolta, one of the oldest streets in Manila, was created in 1594. Its name was derived from the Spanish word escoltar, meaning "to escort".

In Walter Robb's essay Main Street, he states, "The gates of the walled city were closed at sunset, when curfew rang from the towers of all its churches; they were not opened again until dawn. Low, massive, stone-arched, typically medieval as you see them today, these gates were all furnished out with ponderous drawbridges lowered and raised by rude capstans, with strong porcullises [sic] of square iron bars which settled into place as the drawbridges rose upright." After some individuals went missing "along the sandy path to the bridge," Robb continues, a delegation petitioned the governor to station a detachment of halberdiers "along the path as a guard until after the city gates were closed." "The governor assented, detailing a grizzled officer to arrange the escort, the escolta, in such a manner as to protect the path for a period of six months; and from this the winding path by the riverside got its name, la escolta, the escort, long before it was widened to the dignity of a street."

Escolta was known for its concentration of immigrant merchants, mainly from Fujian, China, who came to make their fortune during the Manila-Acapulco Galleon trade. The street was lined with shops and boutiques selling imported goods from China, Europe, and elsewhere in Latin America that arrived at the nearby port of San Nicolas. By the late 19th century, Escolta flourished into a fashionable business district hosting the city's tallest buildings and the Manila Stock Exchange. The shops were replaced by modern department stores, and an electric tram line known as tranvía plied the street. Escolta served as the city's primary commercial district until its decline in the 1960s when the center of business gradually shifted to Makati.

== In music ==
The first known reference to "La Escolta" can be heard on the zarzuela "El pay-pay de Manila".

== Notable architectural structures ==
=== Destroyed / demolished ===
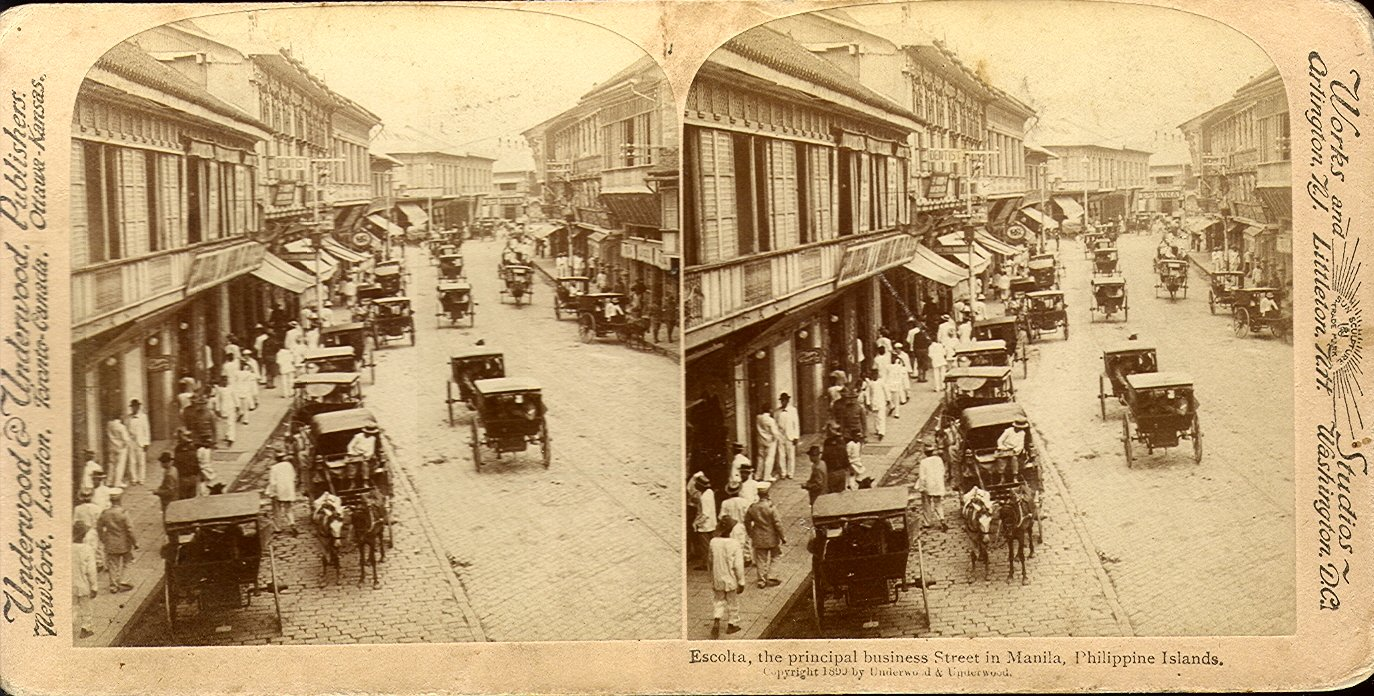
Escolta, 1899

- Capitol Theater: Designed by Juan Nakpil and built in the 1930s, this theater had a double balcony, a rare architectural design. The theater's facade has reliefs of two muses done by Francesco Monti. Largely demolished in June 2020 to make way for a high-rise building, retaining some of its facade after a cease-and-desist order from the National Commission on Culture and the Arts.
- Crystal Arcade: An Art Deco shopping mall. First fully air-conditioned commercial establishment and home of the first Manila Stock Exchange, the precursor of the Philippine Stock Exchange. During the Japanese occupation, it was home to the Japanese Government Railways and the Board of Tourist Industry. Damaged in the Liberation of Manila. Demolished in the 1960s. The land was occupied by the Philippine National Bank Building until its demolition in 2015.
- Lyric Theater: An Art Deco building later reconstructed in 1937 by National Artist Pablo Antonio. It survived the bombing of Manila during World War II and was the home of Warner Bros productions from 1945 until 1970. The land was occupied by the Philippine National Bank Building until its demolition in 2015.
- Gutierrez Building: Destroyed to make way for the expansion of the Brias Roxas Building in 1931.
- Brias Roxas Building: A military supply store. The enlarged building was completed in 1932. Damaged during the liberation of Manila and eventually demolished. The land was occupied by the Philippine National Bank Building until its demolition in 2015.
- Philippine National Bank Building: An office building in the International style, inaugurated in 1966. Following a 2015 fire, it was declared structurally unsound and was demolished the following year by its owners, the city government of Manila.
- Sta. Cruz Building: Inaugurated 1948. Gutted, demolition stopped with the façade largely intact due to a cease and desist order from the National Commission on Culture and the Arts in 2019. Fire 2019, completely demolished 2021.
- American Chamber of Commerce building: Also known as the Lusco Building, the Neoclassical building found along Dasmariñas Street and the corner of Burke Street was built in the 1930s. Gutted, a cease and desist order from the National Historical Commission of the Philippines in 2017 prevented its destruction. After negotiations with its owners, the facade would be integrated with the new building named 101 Residence.
- Walter Olsen Building: Built in 1906, it is also known as the Hamilton Fashion Building. It was the first building in the country to be built using steel mesh-reinforced concrete. It was largely demolished in 2018, and its façade was integrated into the newly built Pioneer House Manila.
- Fanlo building: Land now occupied by the Escolta Carpark building.
- Clarke's: First ice cream shop in the country. Land now occupied by the Commercial Band and Trust Company Building
- Salon de Pertierra: First to screen films in the Philippines (1897). Now occupied by the Original Savory, which burned in 2015.
- American Bazaar: Department store founded in 1898.
- La Estrella Del Norte: This was a luxury shopping center built in the Streamline Moderne Art Deco style. It was occupied by Original Savory, established in the 1950s, and renovations modified its appearance. It burned in 2015 and is in a ruined state.
- Philippine National Bank "Old Masonic Temple": Destroyed in the Liberation of Manila.
- La Puerta Del Sol
- Edificio Baretto Building: Destroyed by fire in 1917, rebuilt. Demolished for the construction of the Capitol Theatre in the 1930s.
- American Drug Company Building: Housed Botica Boie, the country's first drugstore. It closed in the 1960s.
- Samanillo Building: A wooden building burned in 1922. In 1928, it was rebuilt in concrete as the Perez-Samanillo building (First United Building).
- Cu-Unjieng Building: An 8-storey building destroyed in the Liberation of Manila. Portions of it are integrated into the Petersen Building.

=== Existing ===
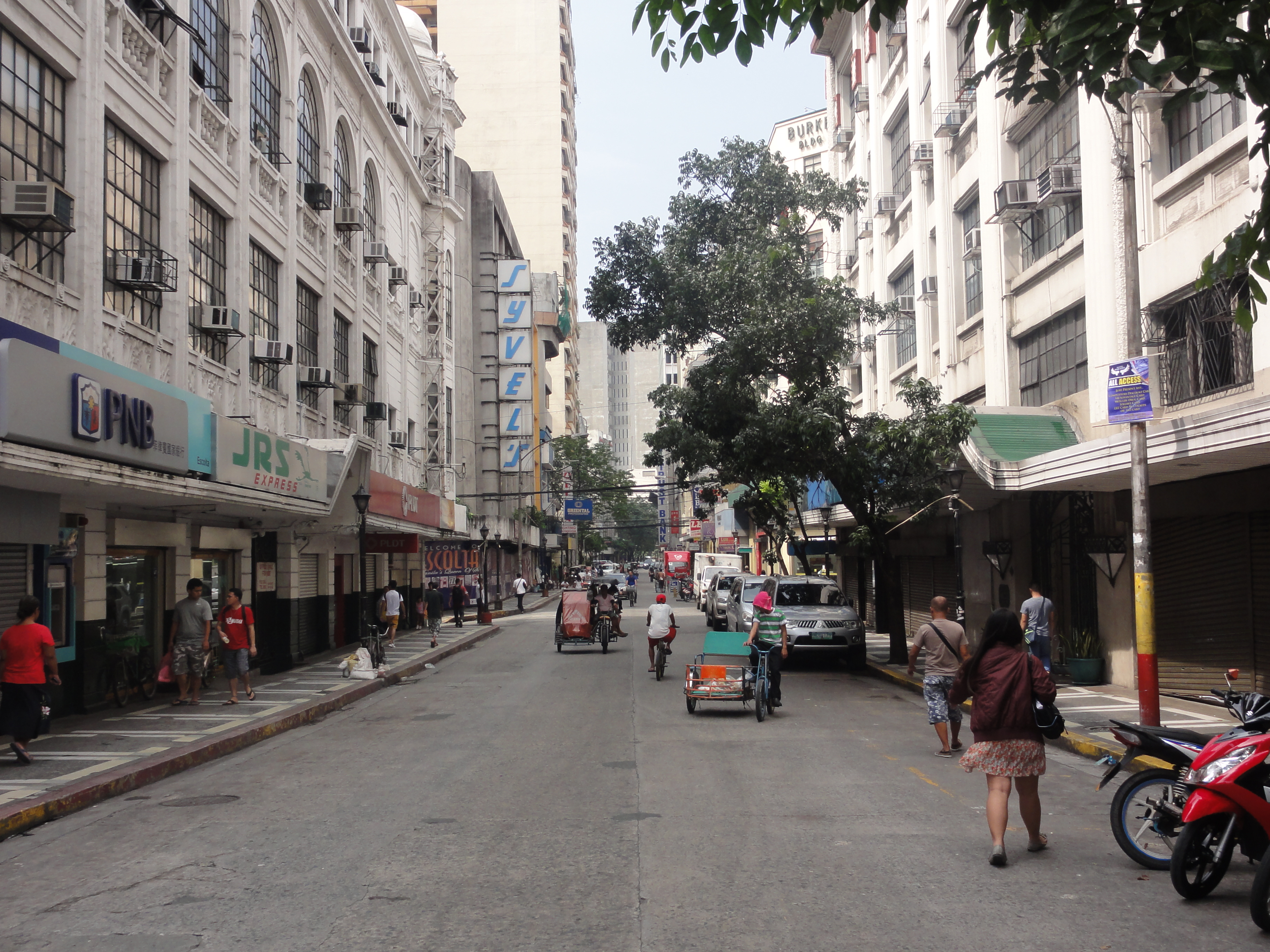
Westward view of Escolta Street in 2014

- Don Roman Santos Building: A neo-classical building fronting Plaza Goiti (Lacson) at the eastern end of Escolta Street. The building once housed the headquarters of Monte de Piedad and Prudential Bank before it was sold to the Bank of the Philippine Islands.
- First United Building: One of the few surviving examples of Art Deco architecture in Manila, it was the tallest building in Manila when it was completed in 1928. Designed by Andres Luna de San Pedro, it was previously named the Perez Samanillo Building.
- El Hogar Filipino Building: A neo-classical and Renaissance building built as a wedding gift for the union of a Zobel daughter and a Peruvian count back in 1914. It was designed by Ramon Irureta-Goyena and Francisco Perez-Muñoz in the Beaux Arts Style.
- Regina Building: Built in 1934, this four-storey building was designed in the neo-classical style by Andres Luna de San Pedro.
- Natividad Building: A Beaux-Arts style building that housed the Insurance Commission in the 1950s.
- Burke Building: Named after cardiologist William J. Burke, the building is known as the location of the first elevator in Manila.
- Calvo Building: Another fine example of Beaux-Arts architecture, it was built in 1938 by Angel Calvo and designed by Fernando Ocampo. In 1950, the building was also the location of the first radio studio of DZBB-AM (a flagship AM radio station of GMA Network) until 1957, when it was transferred to GMA Network Center (the current headquarters of GMA 7) along EDSA corner Timog Avenue, Diliman, Quezon City.
- Pan Pacific Industrial Sales Co Building: This building, also known as the Panpisco Building, was built in the 1950s.
- Heacock Department Store: Collapsed in 1937 due to an earthquake. Rebuilt in 1938 but gutted in the Liberation of Manila. Reopened after reconstruction in 1948. Became Syvel's. Now abandoned.
- Commercial Band and Trust Company Building: Also known as AICS Building.
- Uy Chaco Building: Also known as the Philtrust Building.
- HSBC Building

== Gallery ==
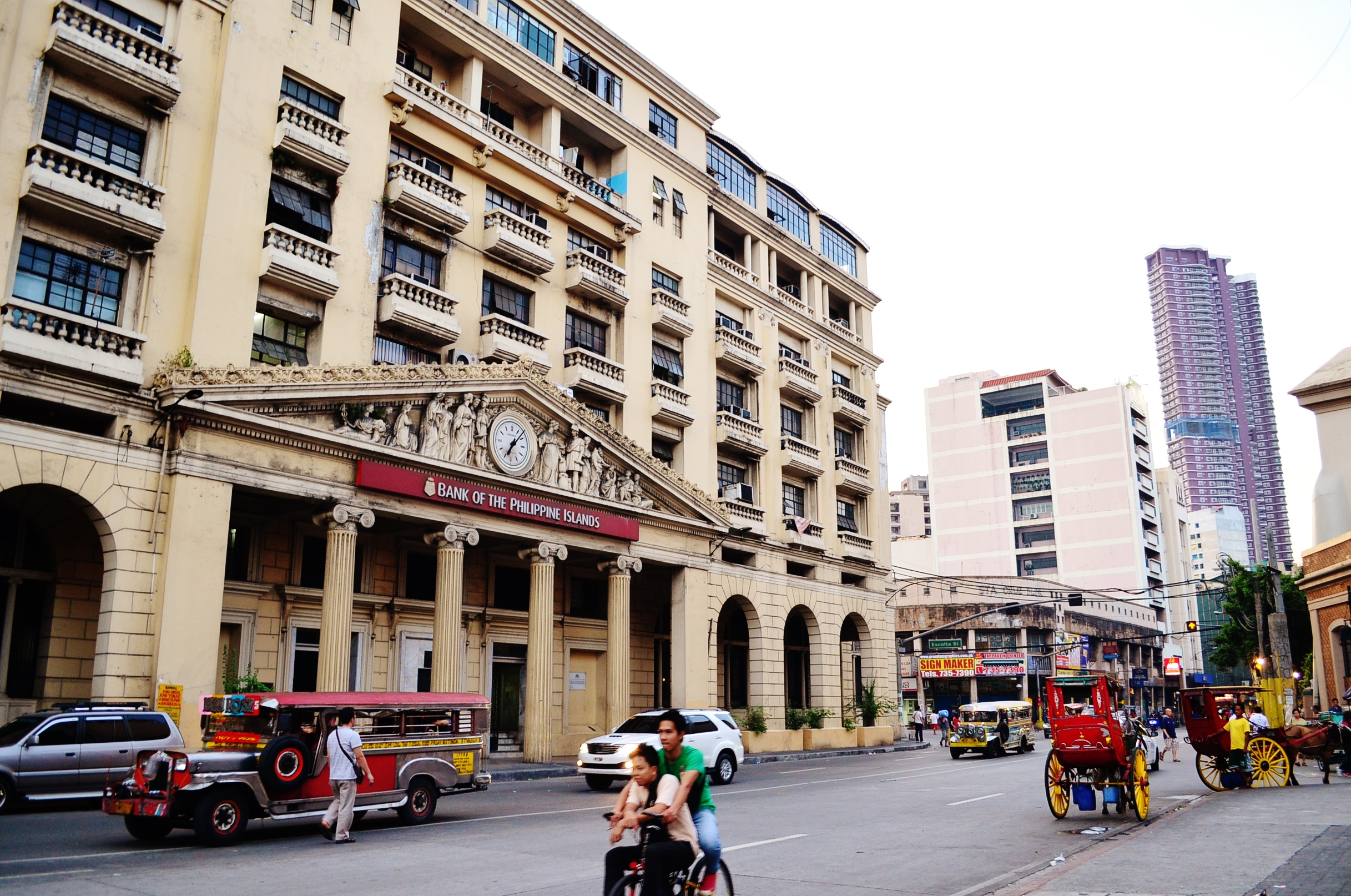
Roman R. Santos Building

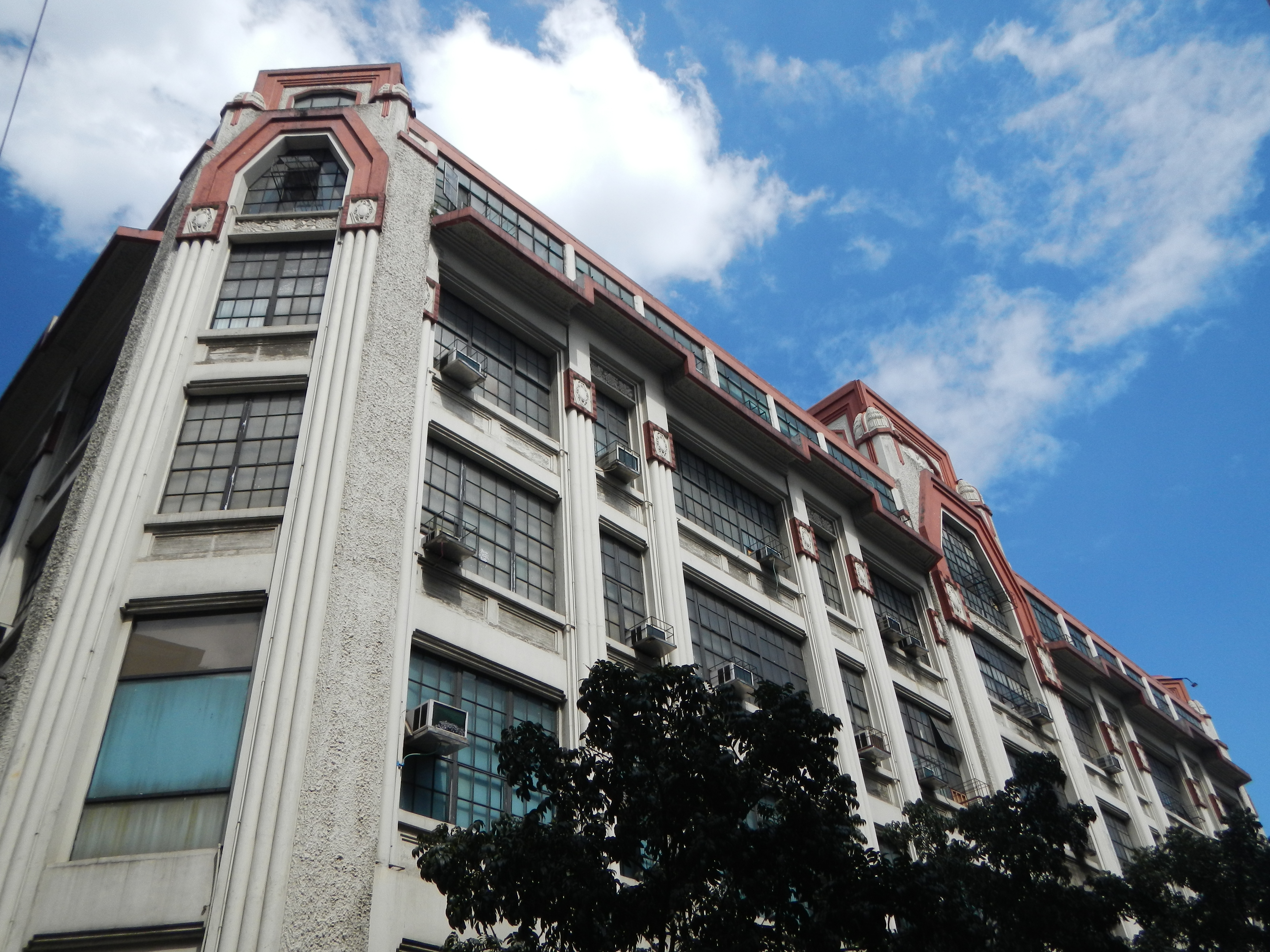
First United Building (former Perez-Samanillo Building)

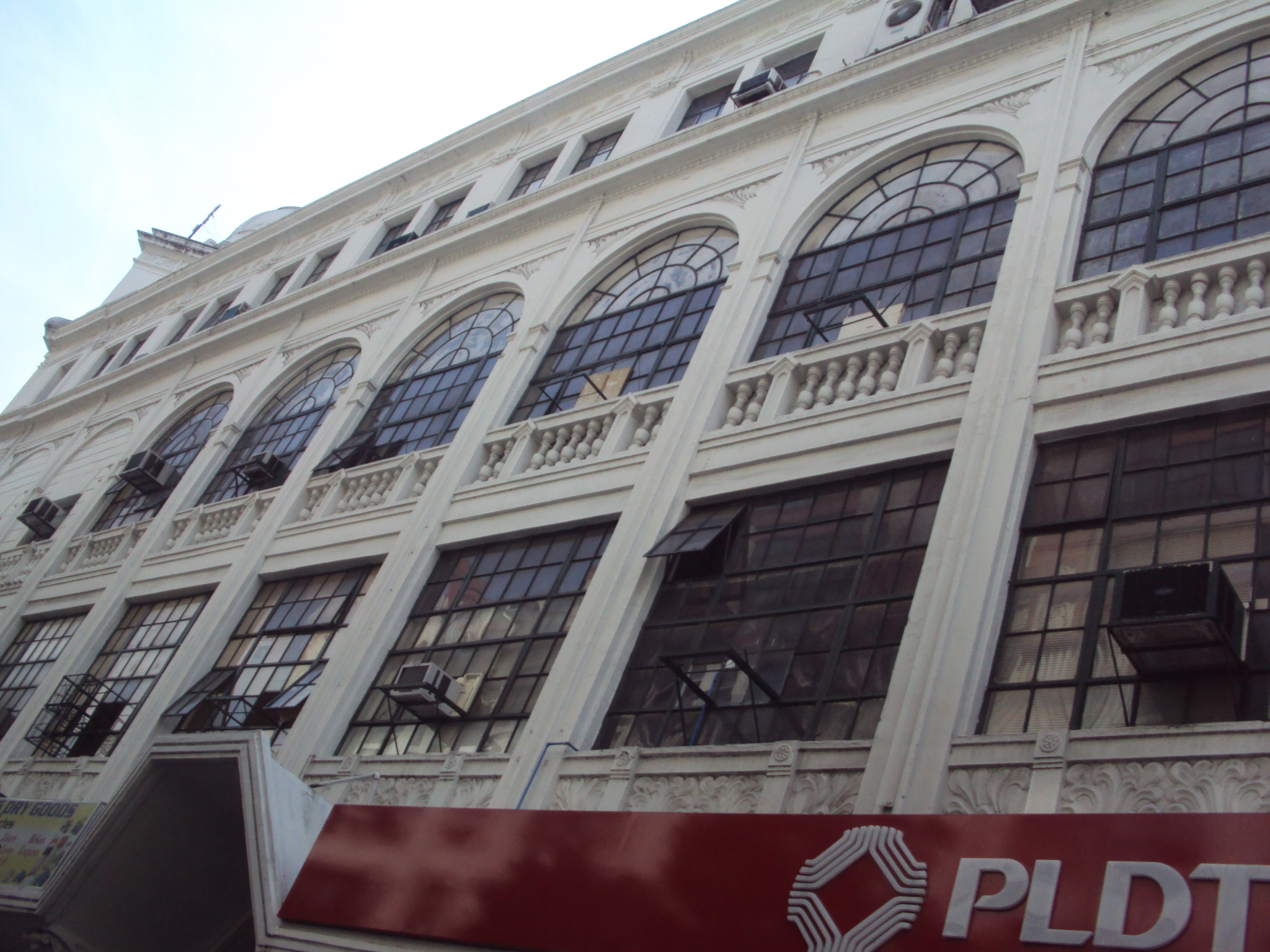
Regina Building north façade viewed from the street

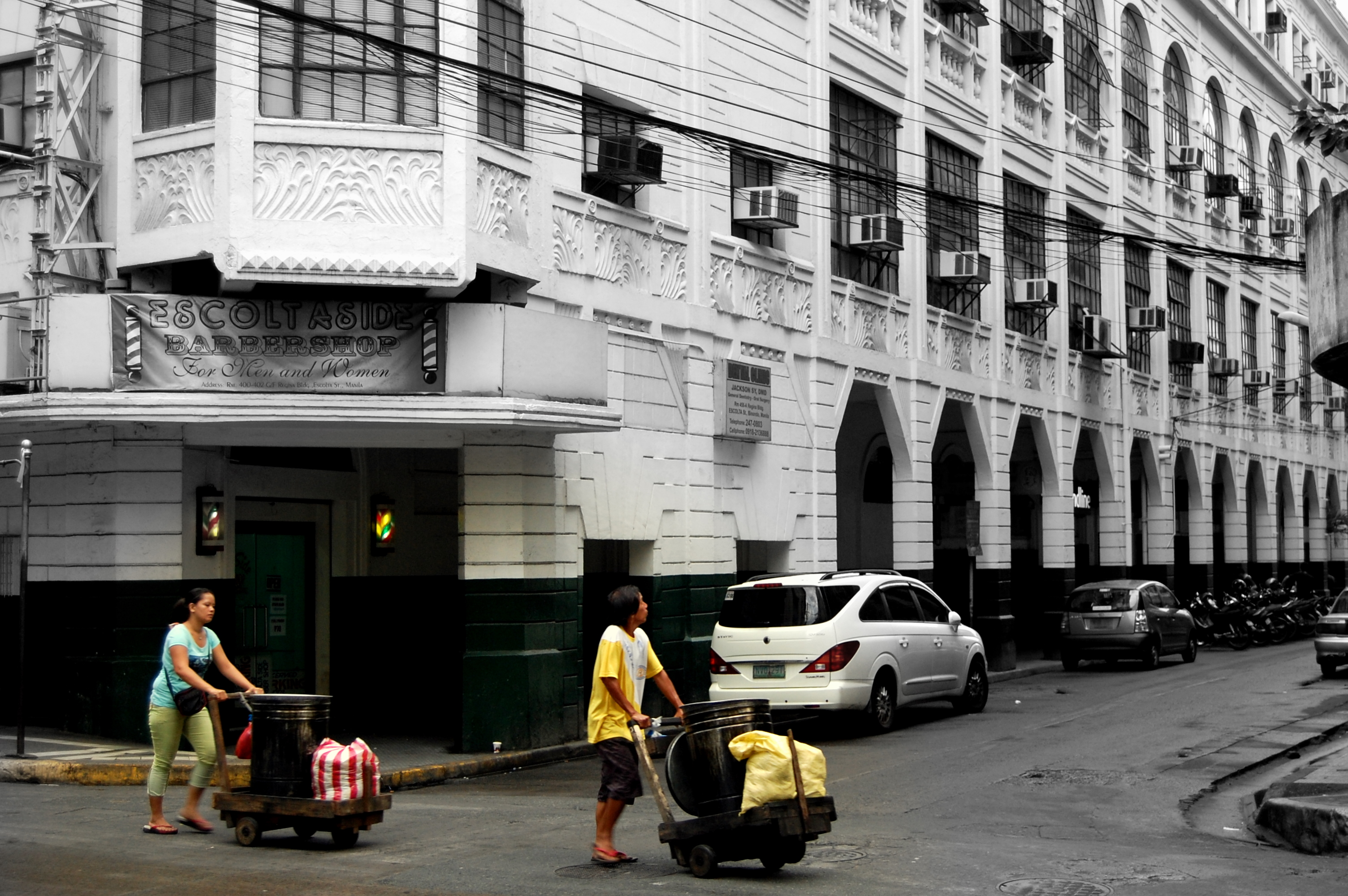
Street vendors in front of Regina Building at Escolta, Manila

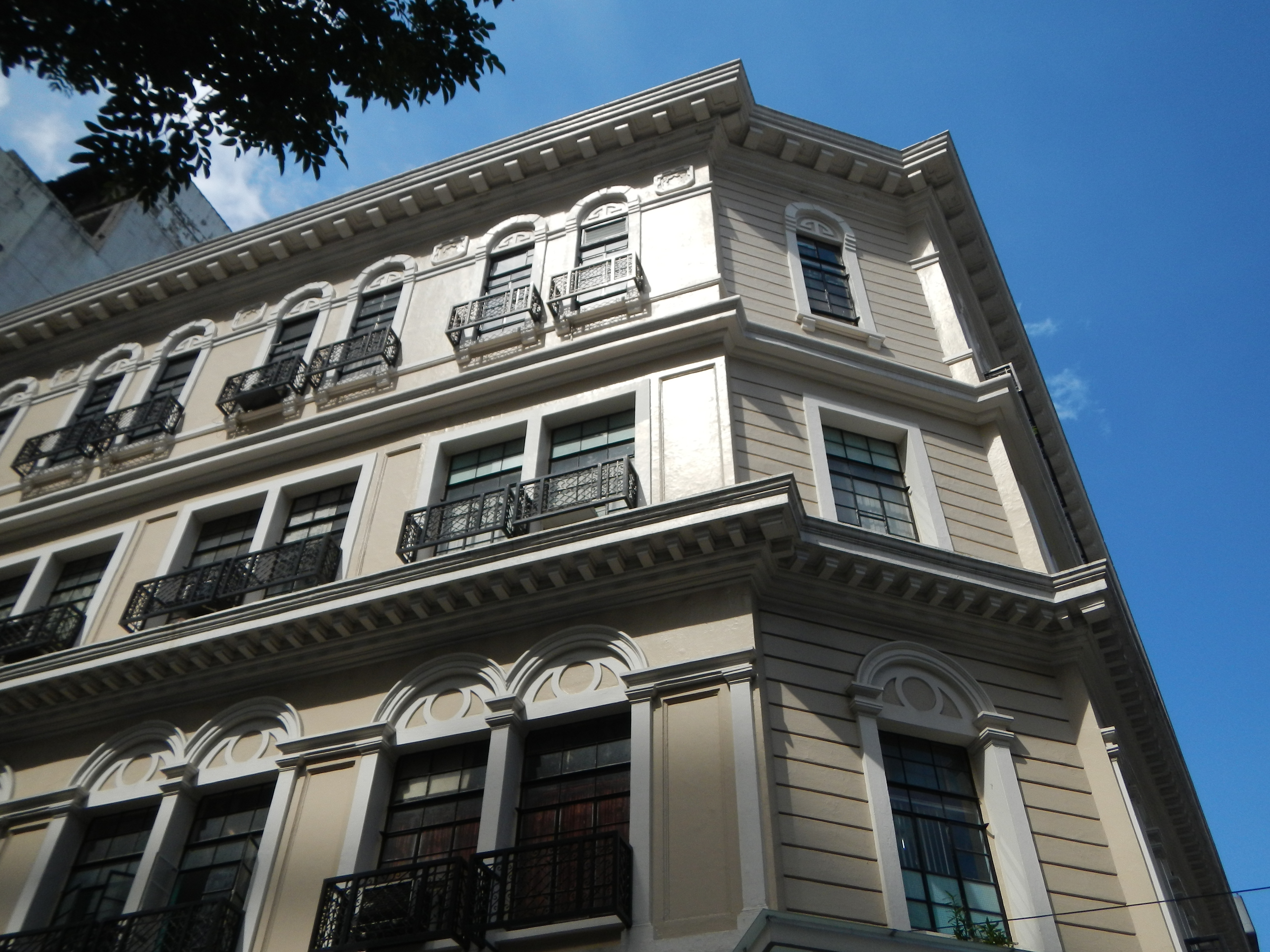
Natividad Building

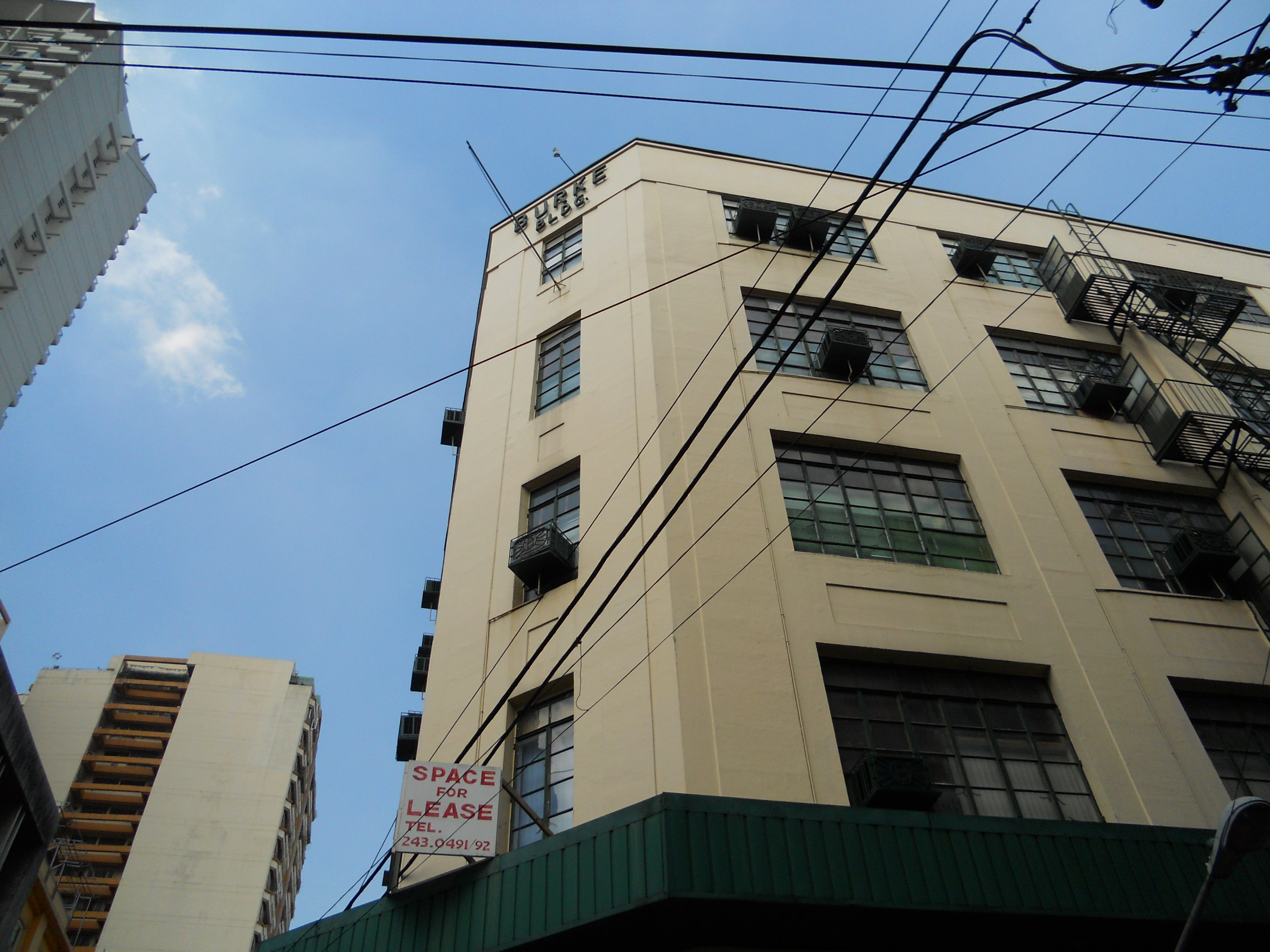
Burke Building

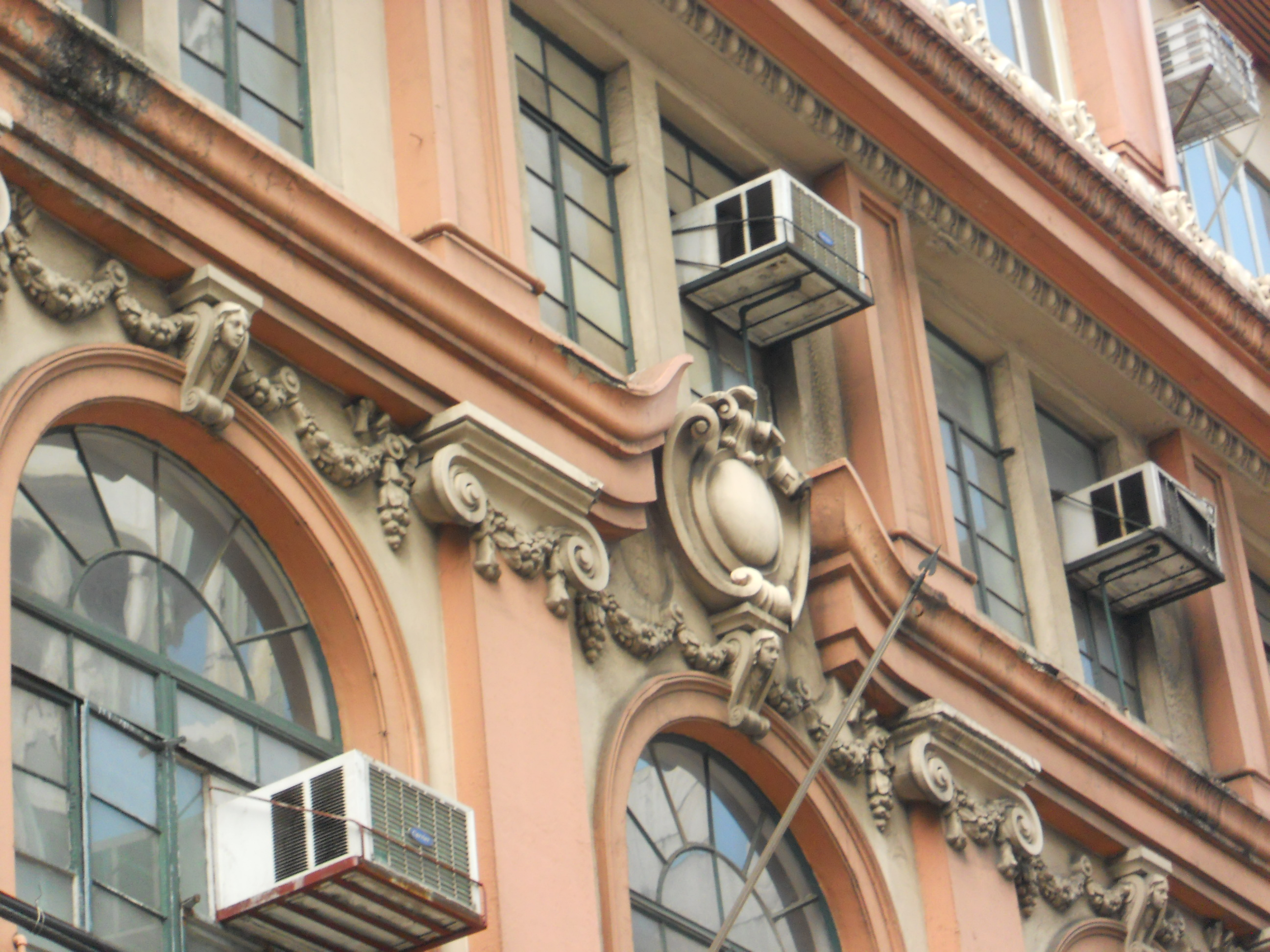
Calvo Building beaux-arts details

== See also ==
- Colon Street
- Calle Real
- Hidalgo Street
