= Beaux-Arts architecture =

Neoclassical architectural style

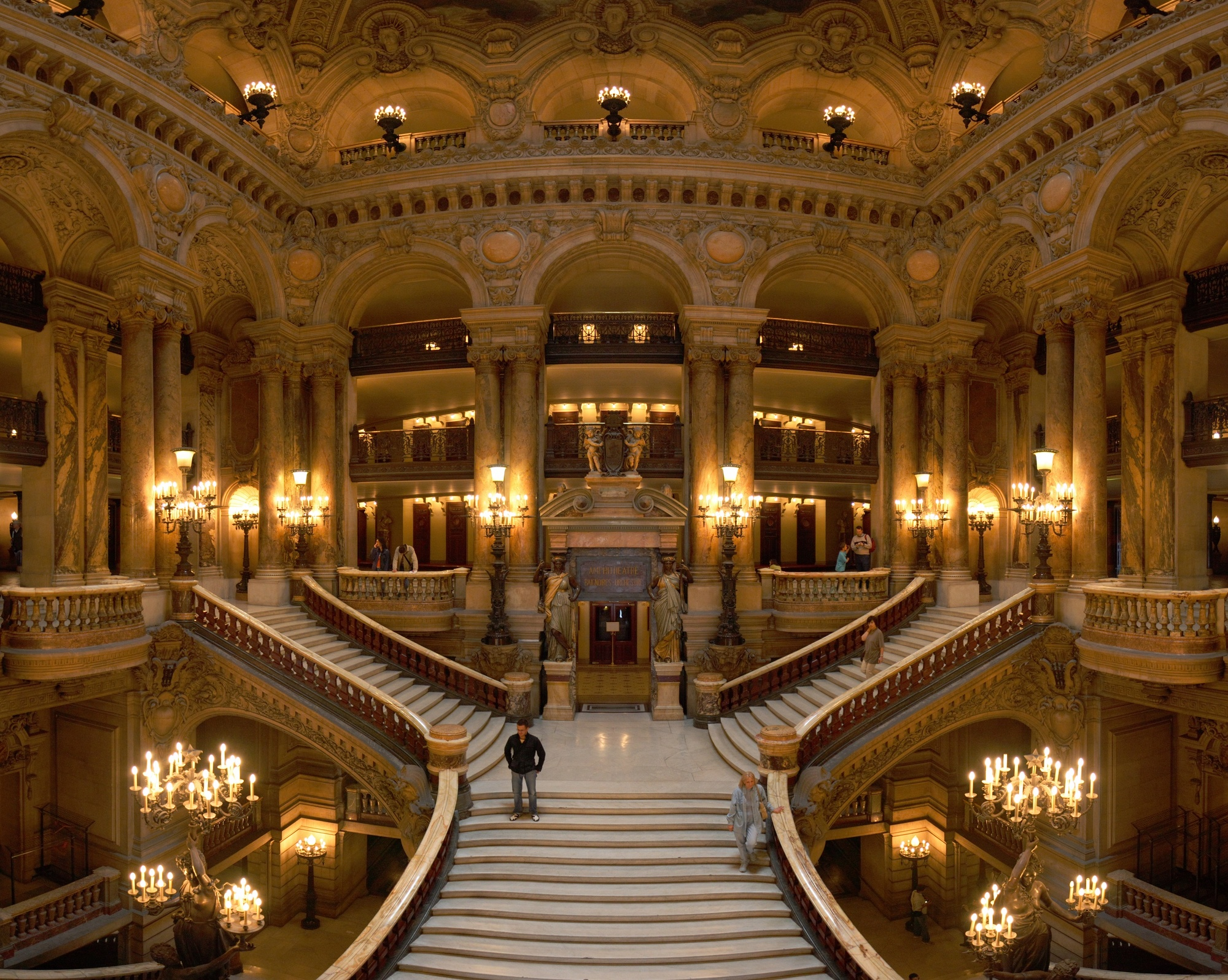
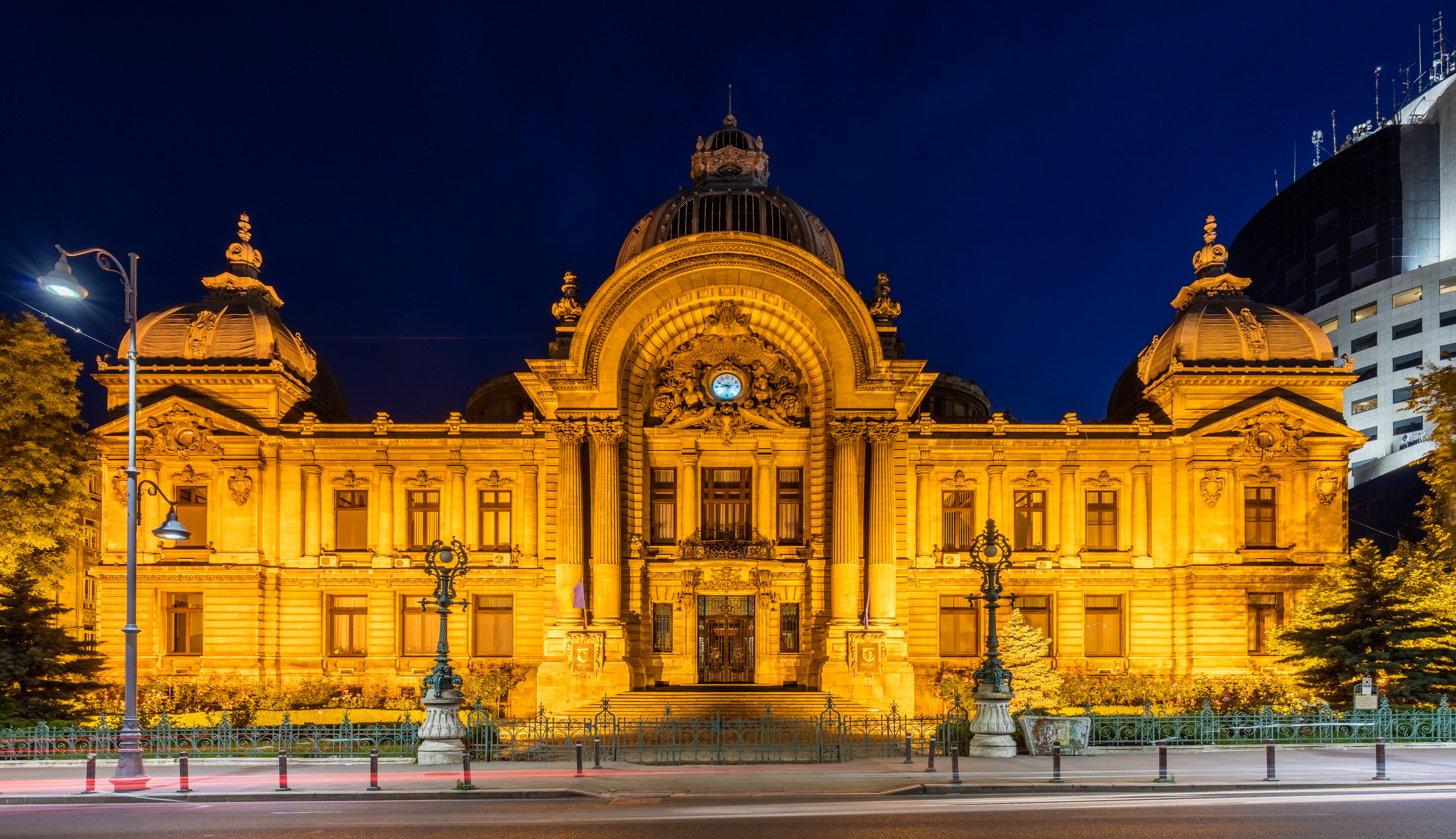
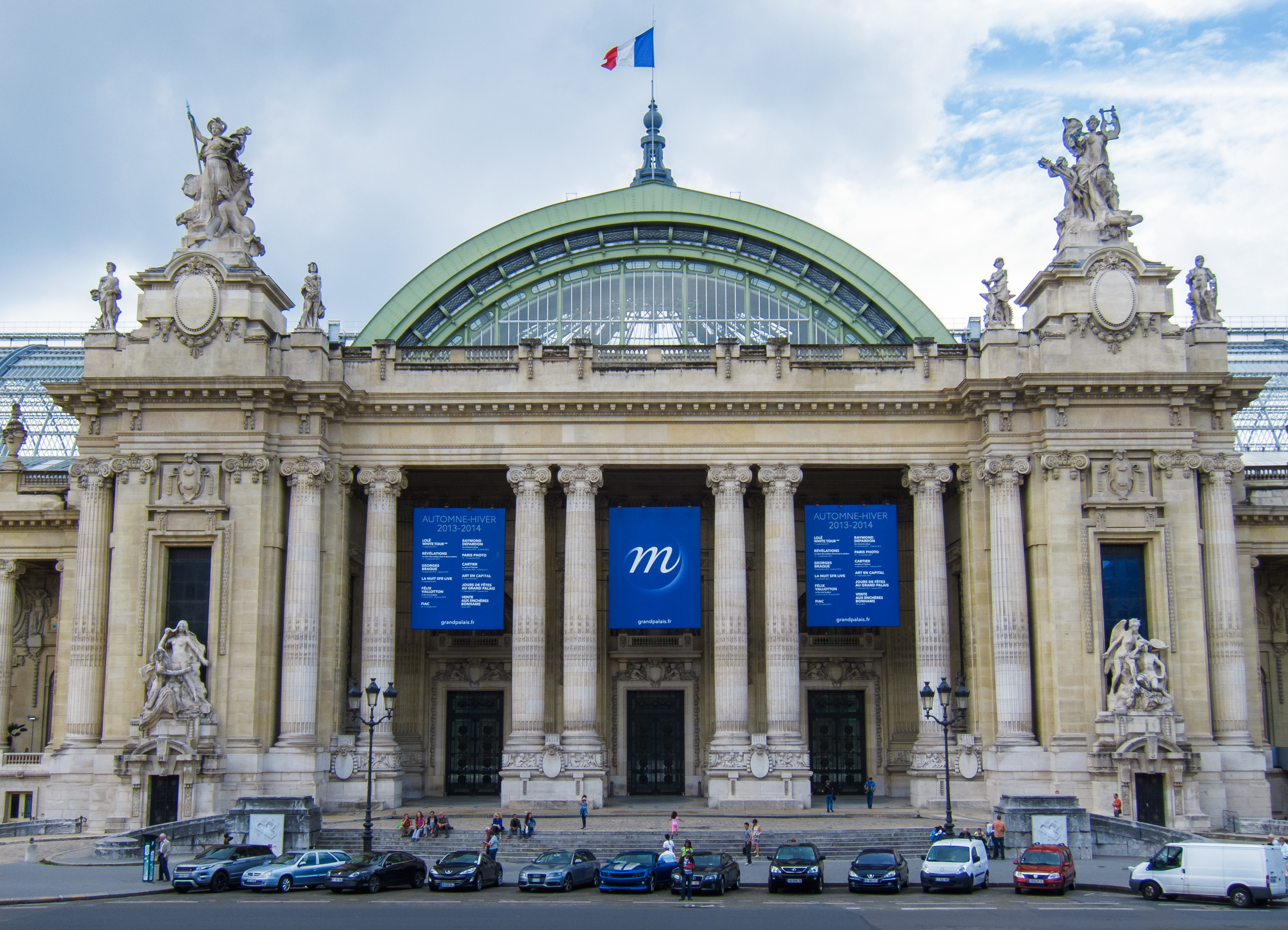
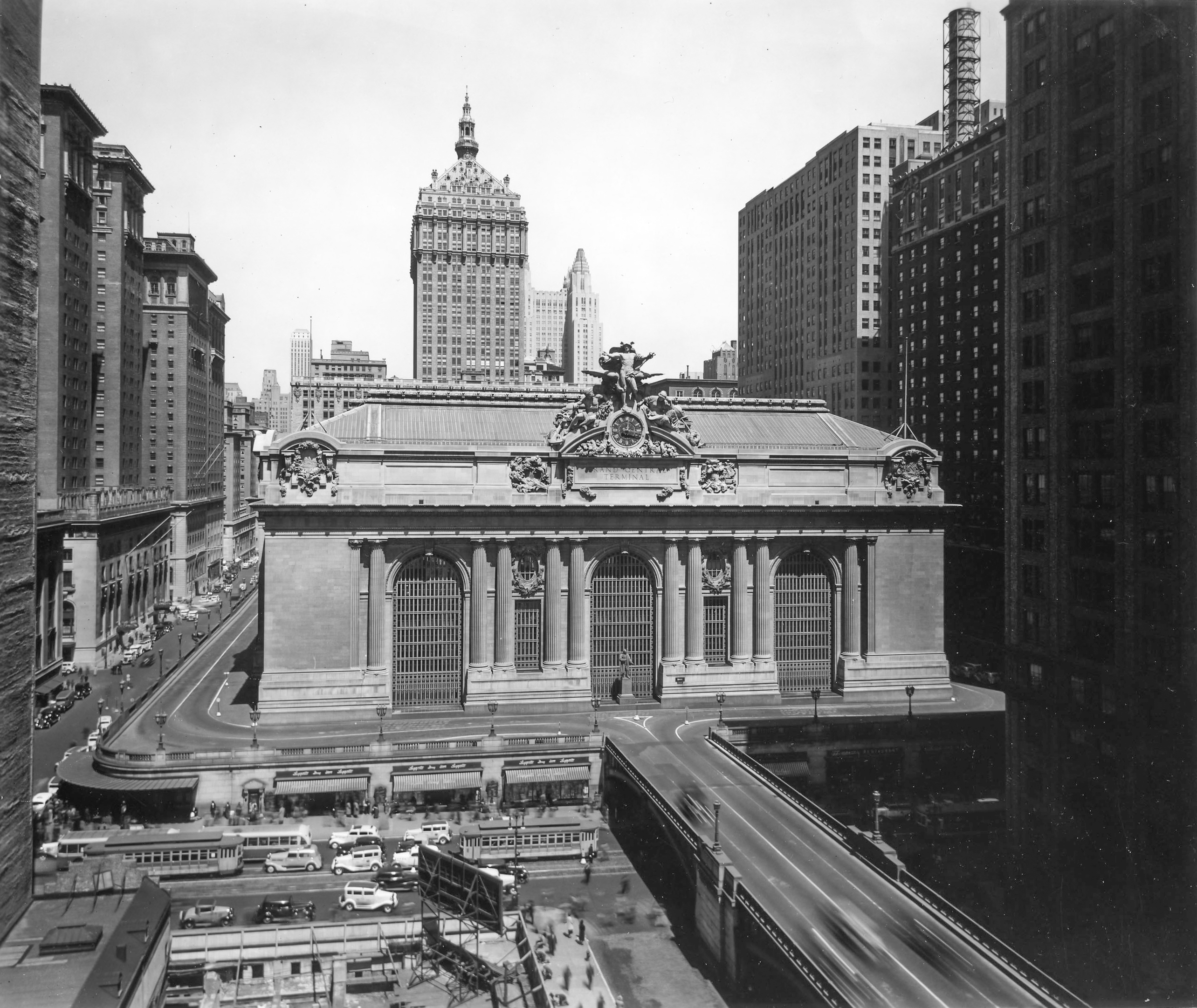
- Top: The Grand staircase of the Palais Garnier (Paris), 1860–1875, by Charles Garnier; Second: The CEC Palace on Victory Avenue (Bucharest, Romania), 1897–1900, by Paul Gottereau; Third: Entrance of the Grand Palais (Paris), 1900, by Charles Girault; Bottom: Grand Central Terminal and the New York Central Building (New York City), pictured in 1944

Beaux-Arts architecture (/boʊz ˈɑːr/ bohz AR, French: [boz‿aʁ]) was the academic architectural style taught at the École des Beaux-Arts in Paris, particularly from the 1830s to the end of the 19th century. It drew upon the principles of French neoclassicism, but also incorporated Renaissance and Baroque elements, and used modern materials, such as iron and glass, and later, steel. It was an important style and was enormously influential in Europe and the Americas through the end of the 19th century and into the 20th, particularly for institutional and public buildings.

== History ==
The Beaux-Arts style evolved from the French classicism of the Louis XIV style, and then French neoclassicism beginning with the Louis XV style and Louis XVI style. French architectural styles before the French Revolution were governed by Académie royale d'architecture (1671–1793), then, following the French Revolution, by the Architecture section of the Académie des Beaux-Arts. The academy held the competition for the Grand Prix de Rome in architecture, which offered prize winners a chance to study the classical architecture of antiquity in Rome.

The formal neoclassicism of the old regime was challenged by four teachers at the academy, Joseph-Louis Duc, Félix Duban, Henri Labrouste, and Léon Vaudoyer, who had studied at the French Academy in Rome at the end of the 1820s. They wanted to break away from the strict formality of the old style by introducing new models of architecture from the Middle Ages and the Renaissance. Their goal was to create an authentic French style based on French models. Their work was aided beginning in 1837 by the creation of the Commission of Historic Monuments, headed by the writer and historian Prosper Mérimée, and by the great interest in the Middle Ages caused by the publication in 1831 of The Hunchback of Notre-Dame by Victor Hugo. Their declared intention was to "imprint upon our architecture a truly national character."

The style referred to as Beaux-Arts in English reached the apex of its development during the Second Empire (1852–1870) and the Third Republic that followed. The style of instruction that produced Beaux-Arts architecture continued without major interruption until 1968.

The Beaux-Arts style heavily influenced the architecture of the United States in the period from 1880 to 1920. In contrast, many European architects of the period 1860–1914 outside France gravitated away from Beaux-Arts and towards their own national academic centers. Owing to the cultural politics of the late 19th century, British architects of Imperial classicism followed a somewhat more independent course, a development culminating in Sir Edwin Lutyens's New Delhi government buildings.

== Training ==
The Beaux-Arts training emphasized the mainstream examples of Imperial Roman architecture between Augustus and the Severan emperors, Italian Renaissance, French and Italian Baroque models especially, but the training could then be applied to a broader range of models: Quattrocento Florentine palace fronts or French late Gothic. American architects of the Beaux-Arts generation often returned to Greek models, which had a strong local history in the American Greek Revival of the early 19th century. For the first time, repertories of photographs supplemented meticulous scale drawings and on-site renderings of details.

Beaux-Arts training made great use of agrafes, clasps that link one architectural detail to another; to interpenetration of forms, a Baroque habit; to "speaking architecture" (architecture parlante) in which the appropriateness of symbolism was paid particularly close attention.

Beaux-Arts training emphasized the production of quick conceptual sketches, highly finished perspective presentation drawings, close attention to the program, and knowledgeable detailing. Site considerations included the social and urban context.

All architects-in-training passed through the required stages—studying antique models, constructing analos, analyses reproducing Greek or Roman models, "pocket" studies and other conventional steps—in the long competition for the few places at the Académie de France à Rome (housed in the Villa Medici), whose holders were traditionally required to send presentation drawings, known as envois de Rome, at intervals.

== Characteristics ==
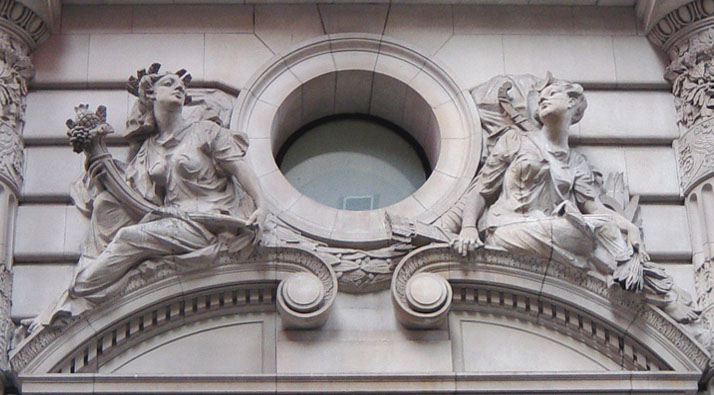
Beaux-Arts building decoration presenting images of the Roman goddesses Pomona and Diana. Note the naturalism of the postures and the channeled rustication of the stonework.

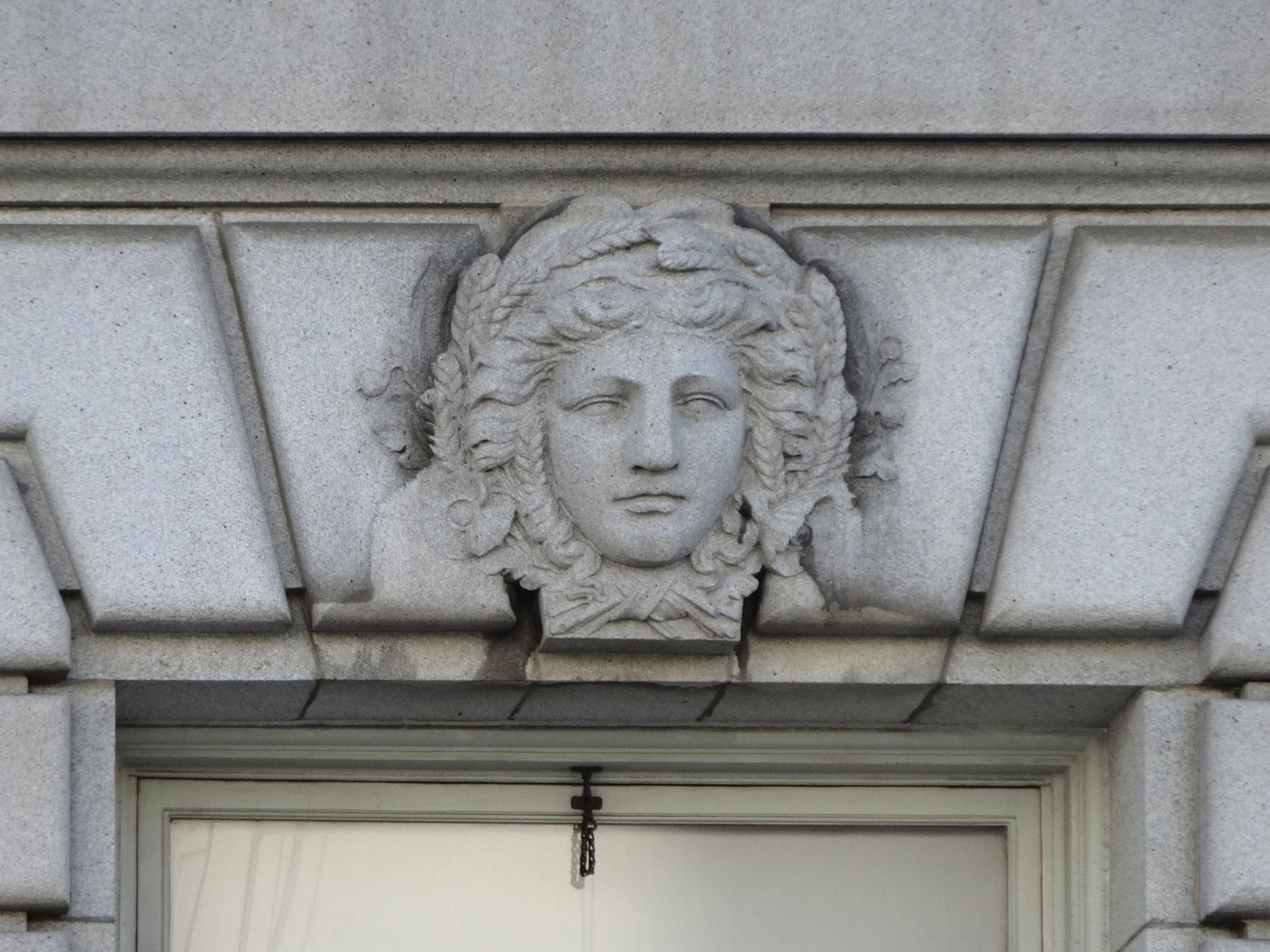
Alternating male and female mascarons decorate keystones on the San Francisco City Hall

Beaux-Arts architecture depended on sculptural decoration along conservative modern lines, employing French and Italian Baroque and Rococo formulas combined with an impressionistic finish and realism. In the façade shown above, Diana grasps the cornice she sits on in a natural action typical of Beaux-Arts integration of sculpture with architecture.

Architectural embellishments including sculptural supporting consoles, deep cornices, swags, and sculptural enrichments employed several generations of architectural modelers and carvers of Italian and Central European backgrounds.

Characteristics of Beaux-Arts architecture included:

- Flat roof
- Rusticated and raised first story
- Hierarchy of spaces, from "noble spaces"—grand entrances and staircases—to utilitarian ones
- Arched windows
- Arched and pedimented doors
- Classical details: references to a synthesis of historicist styles and a tendency to eclecticism; fluency in a number of "manners"
- Symmetry
- Statuary, sculpture (bas-relief panels, figural sculptures, sculptural groups), murals, mosaics, and other artwork, all coordinated in theme to assert the identity of the building
- Classical architectural details: balustrades, pilasters, festoons, cartouches, acroteria, with a prominent display of richly detailed clasps (agrafes), brackets and supporting consoles
- Subtle polychromy

== Beaux-Arts architecture by country ==
=== Europe ===
==== Belgium ====
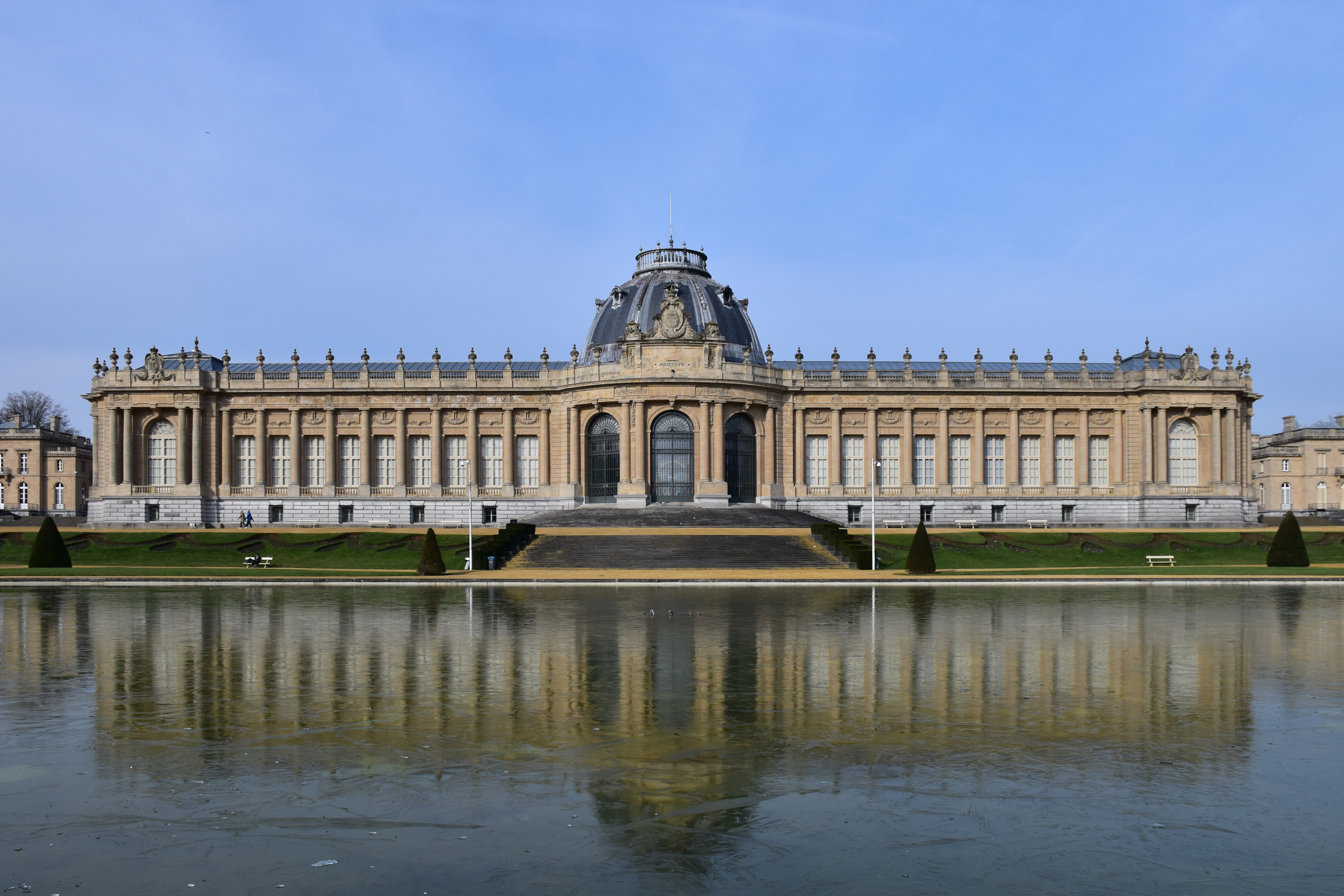
Royal Museum for Central Africa, Tervuren

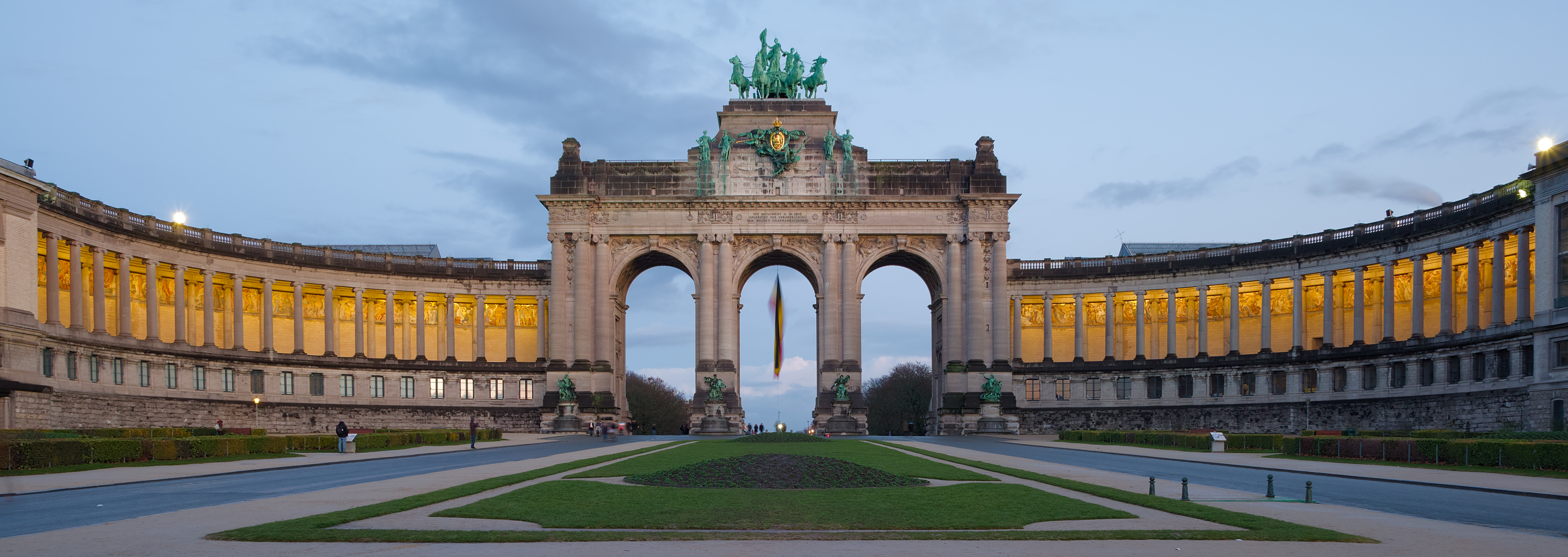
Main triumphal arch with the two side buildings of the Cinquantenaire/Jubelpark, Brussels

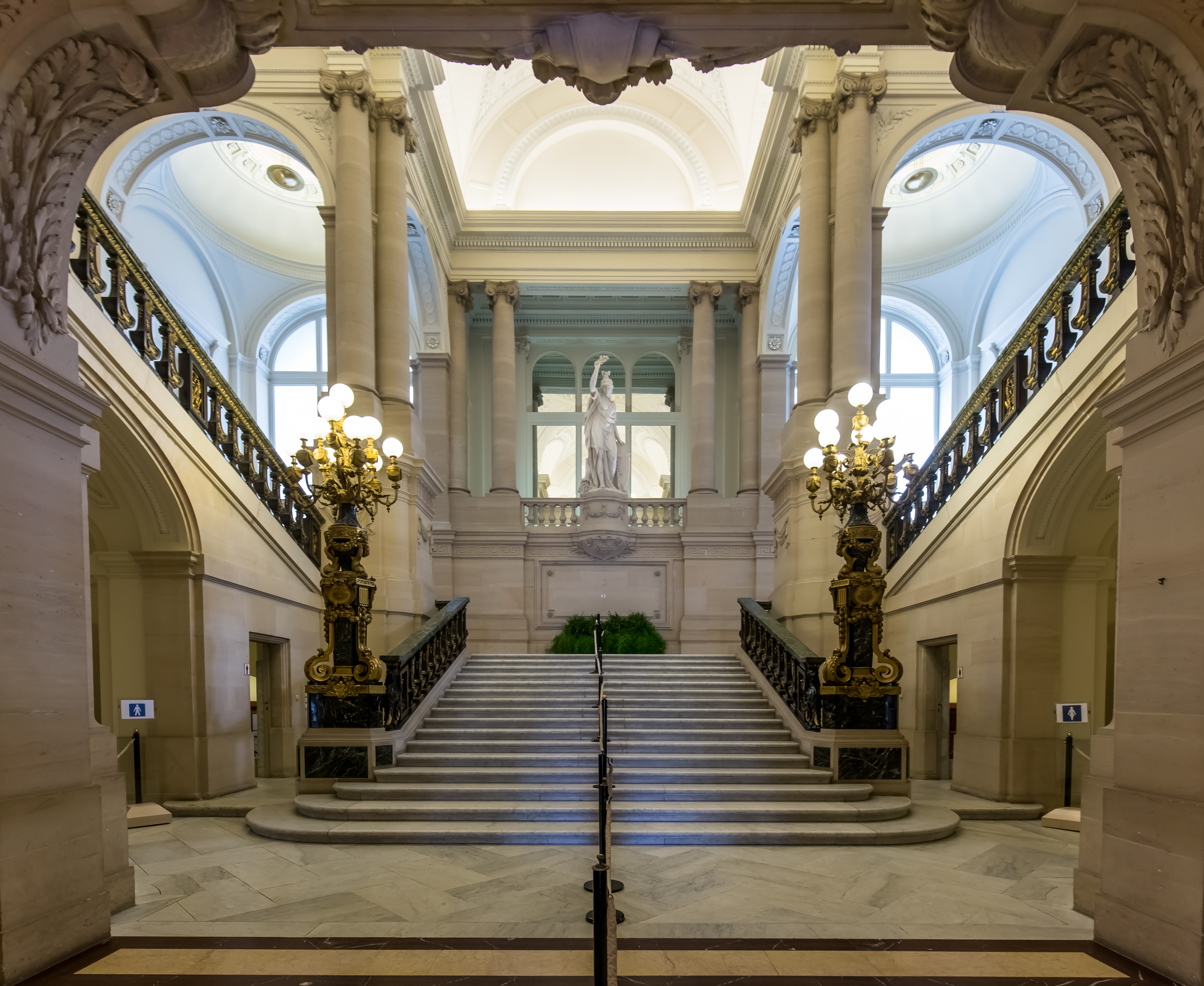
Grand Staircase of the Royal Palace of Brussels

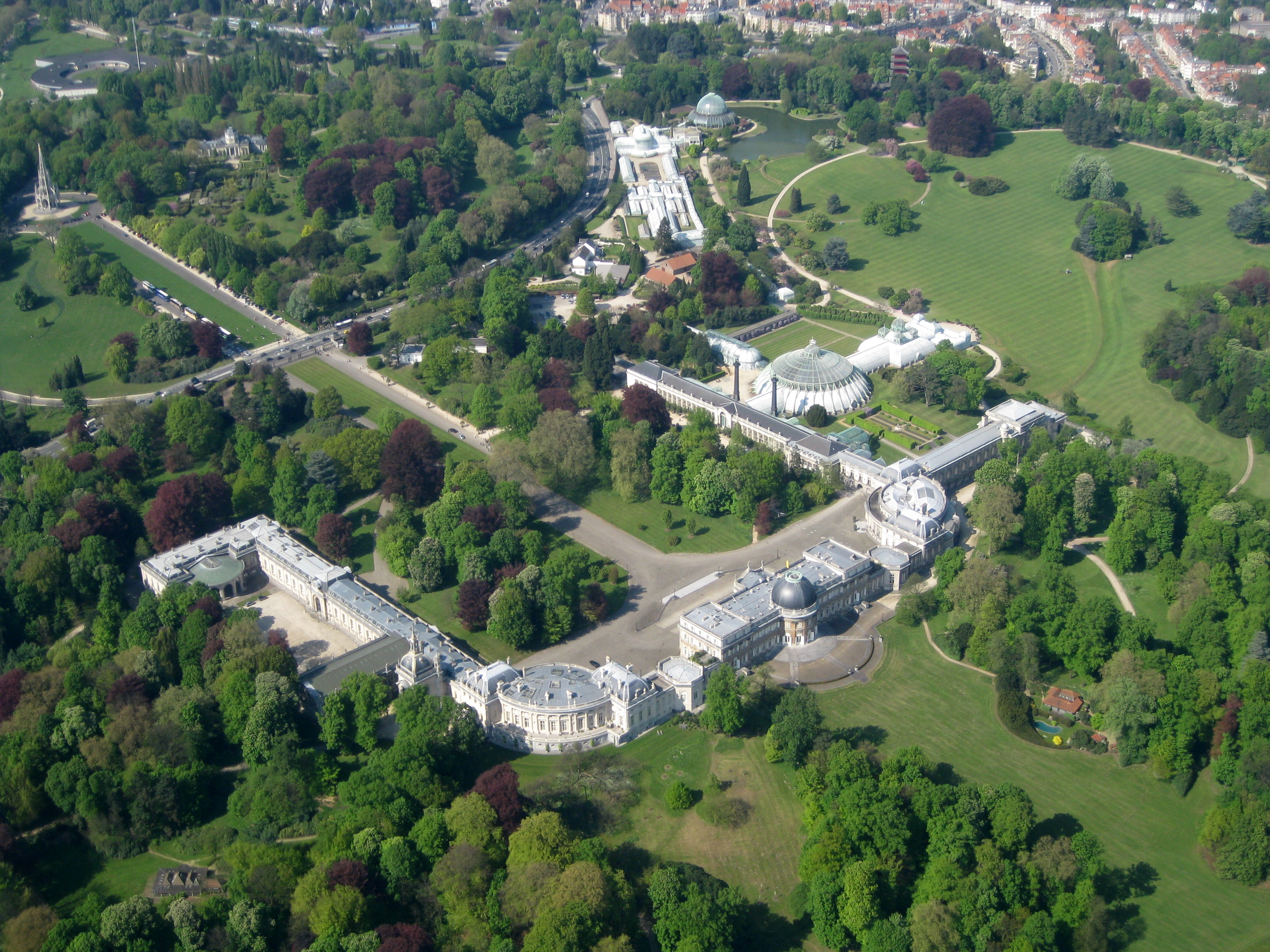
Overview from the Royal Palace of Laeken, Brussels

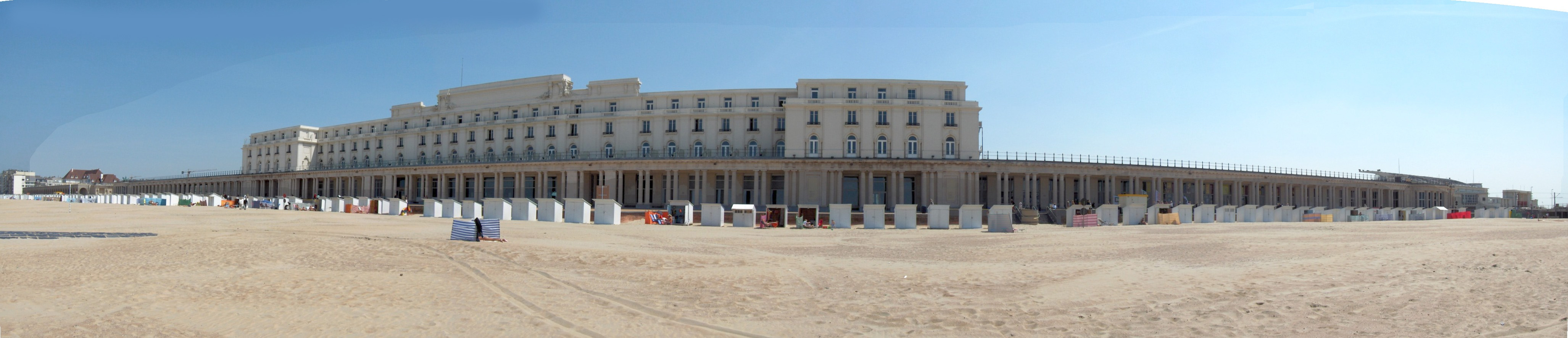
Panoramic view of the Royal Galleries of Ostend

Even though the style was not used as much as in neighbouring country France, some examples of Beaux-Arts buildings can still be found in Belgium. The most prominent of these examples is the Royal Museum for Central Africa in Tervuren, but the complexes and triumphal arch of the Cinquantenaire/Jubelpark in Brussels and expansions of the Palace of Laeken in Brussels and Royal Galleries of Ostend also carry the Beaux-Arts style, created by the French architect Charles Girault. Furthermore, various large Beaux-Arts buildings can also be found in Brussels on the Avenue Molière/Molièrelaan. As an old student of the École des Beaux-Arts and as a designer of the Petit Palais, Girault was the figurehead of the Beaux-Arts around the 20th century. After the death of Alphonse Balat, he became the new and favourite architect of Leopold II of Belgium. Since Leopold was the grandson of Louis Philippe I of France, he loved this specific building style which is similar to and has its roots in the architecture that has been realized in the 17th and 18th century for the French crown.

===== Beaux-Arts buildings in Belgium =====
- 1782: Palace of Laeken, Brussels (extensions)
- 1880: Cinquantenaire/Jubelpark, Brussels (complexes and triumphal arch)
- 1898: Royal Museum for Central Africa, Tervuren
- 1902–1906: Royal Galleries of Ostend, Ostend (extensions)
- 1908: Avenue Molière 177–179 / Avenue Brugmann 176–178, Brussels (a combination of Art Nouveau, Beaux-Arts and eclecticism)
- 1909: Avenue Molière 193, Brussels
- 1910: Avenue Molière 128, Brussels
- 1910: Avenue Molière 130, Brussels
- 1910: Avenue Molière 132, Brussels
- 1910: Avenue Molière 207, Brussels
- 1912: Avenue Molière 519, Brussels
- 1912: Avenue Molière 305, Brussels

==== France ====
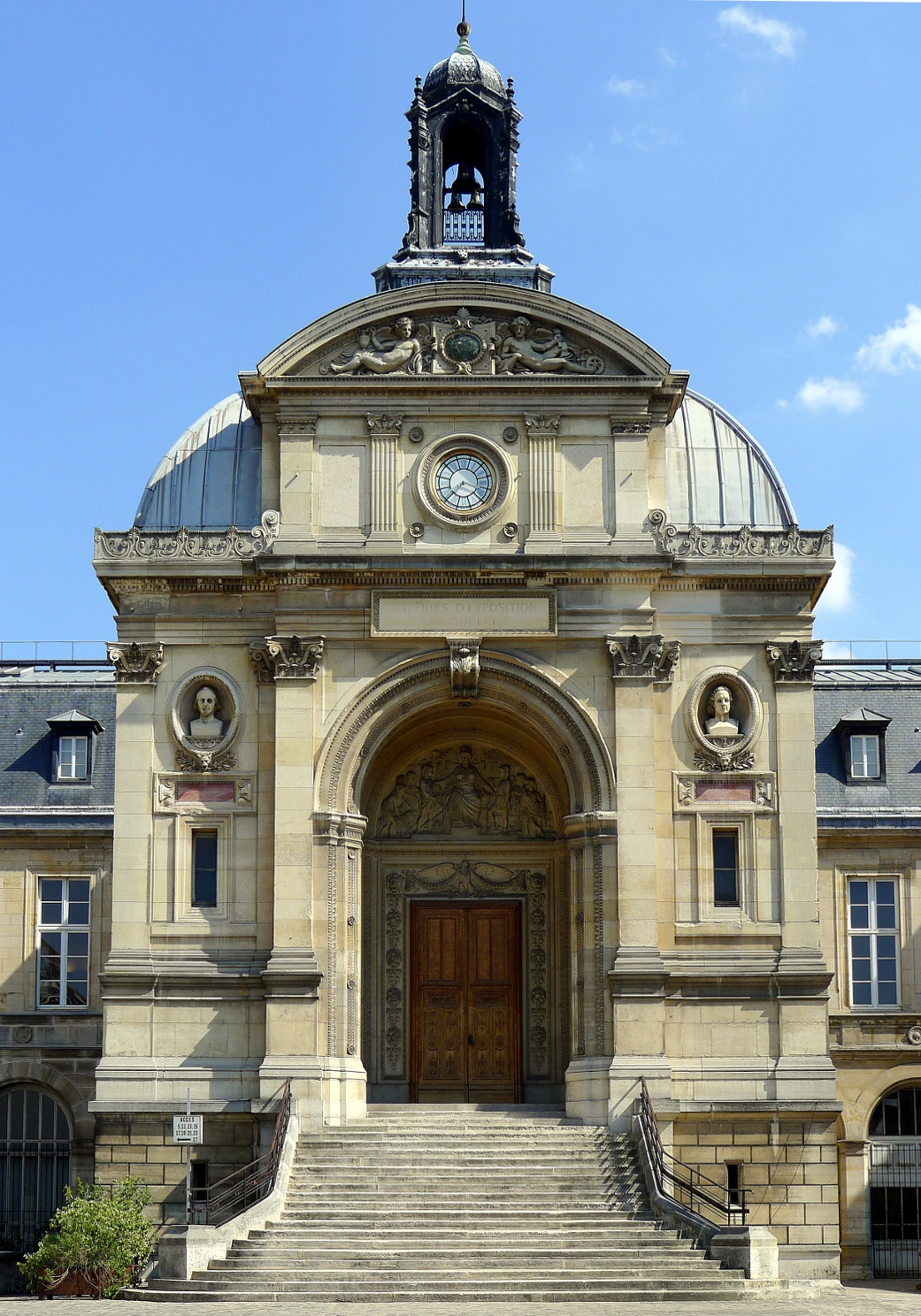
Conservatoire national des arts et métiers, Paris, by Léon Vaudoyer (1838–1867)

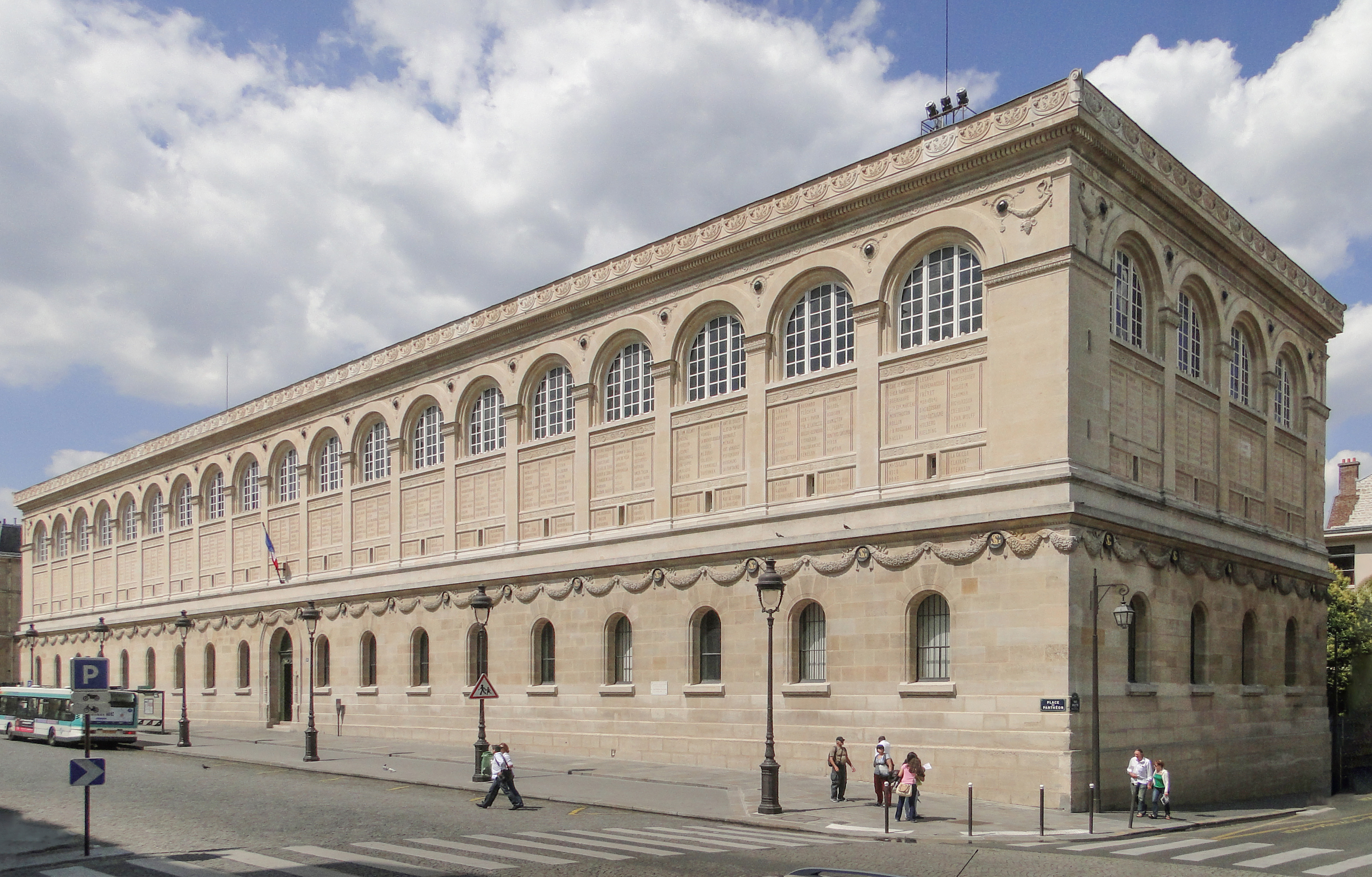
Sainte-Geneviève Library, Paris, by Henri Labrouste (1844–1850)

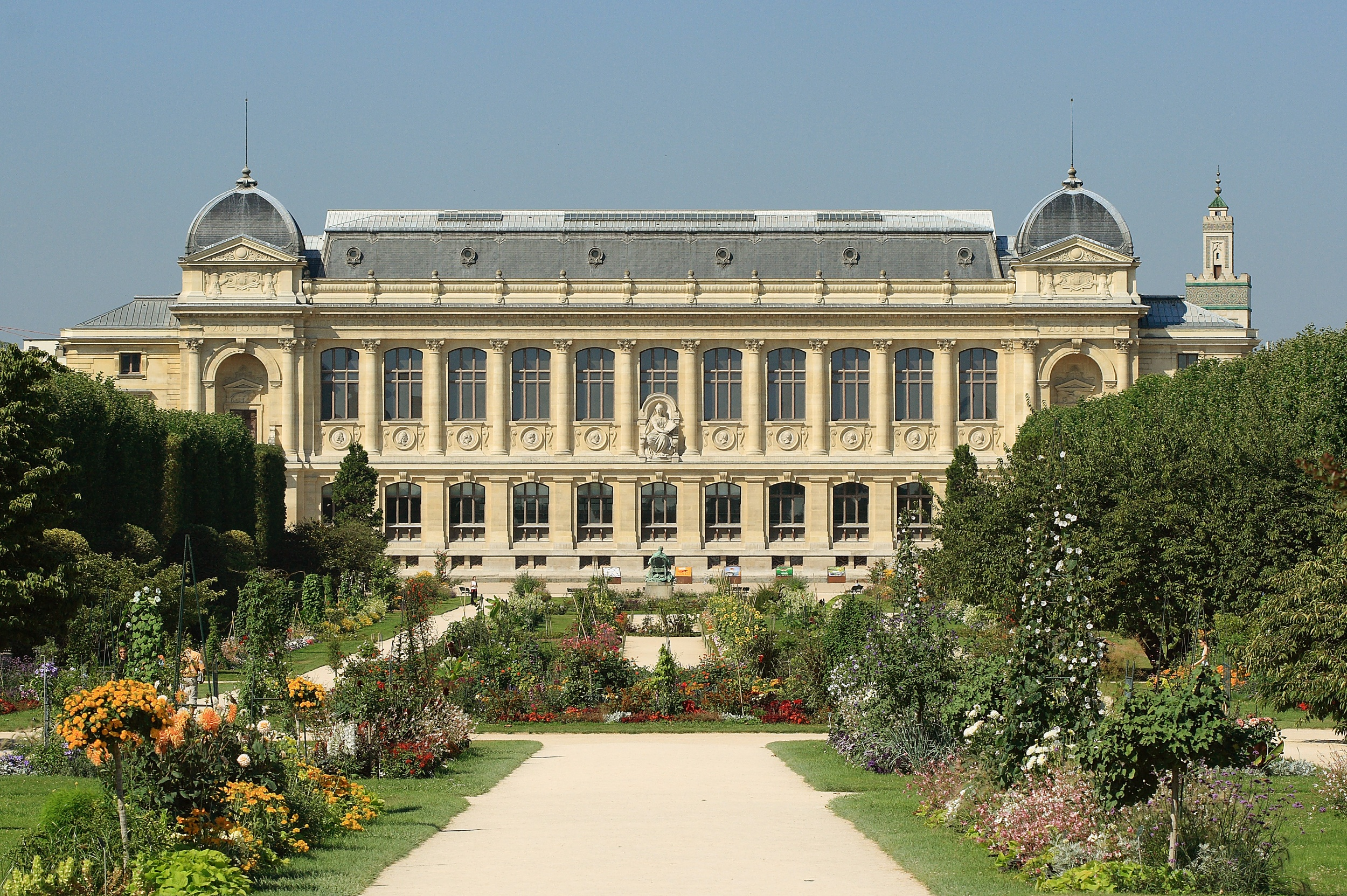
Museum of Natural History, Paris, by Louis-Jules André (1877–1889)

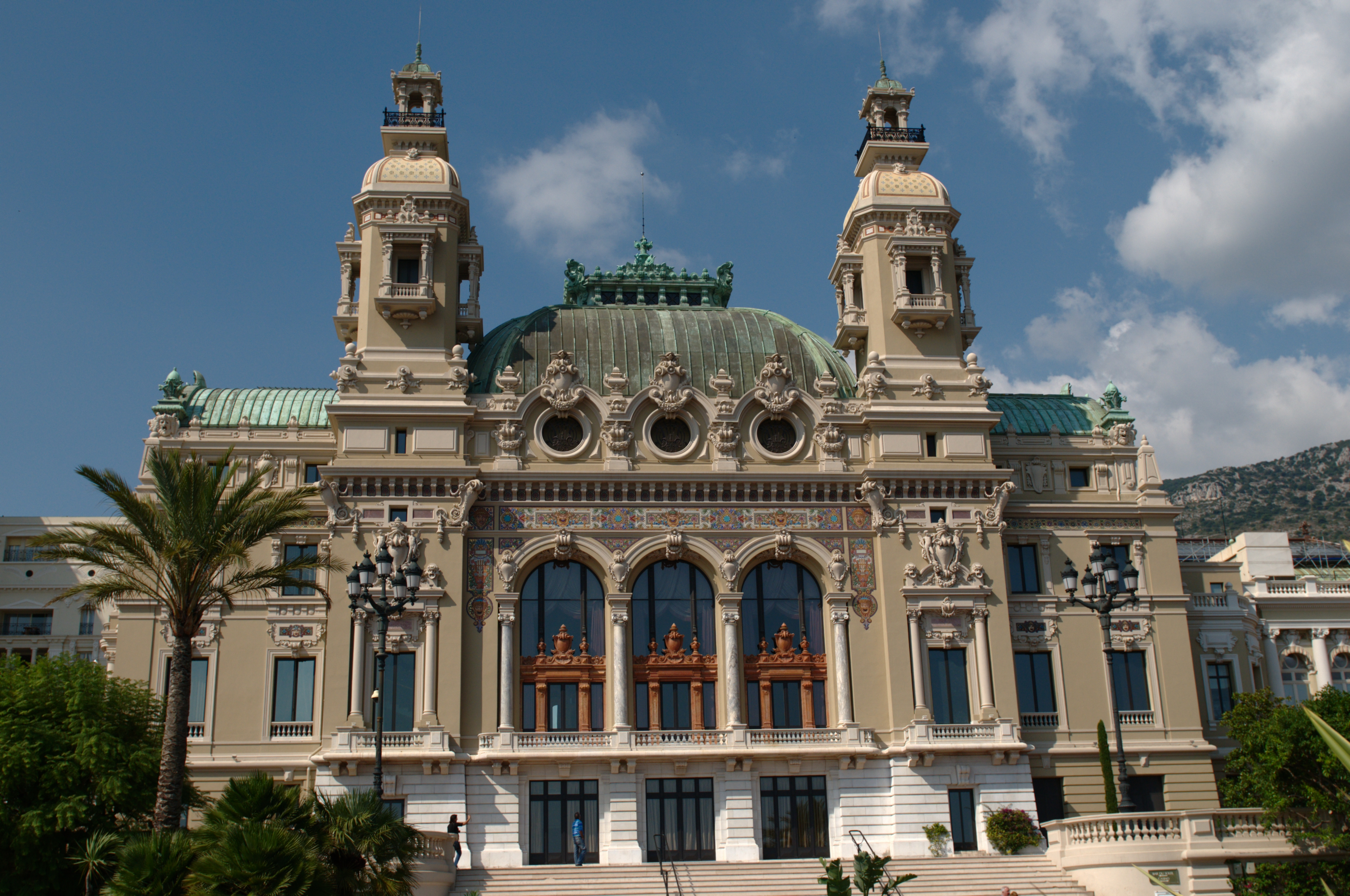
Monte Carlo Casino, Monaco, by Jules Dutrou and Charles Garnier (1878–79)

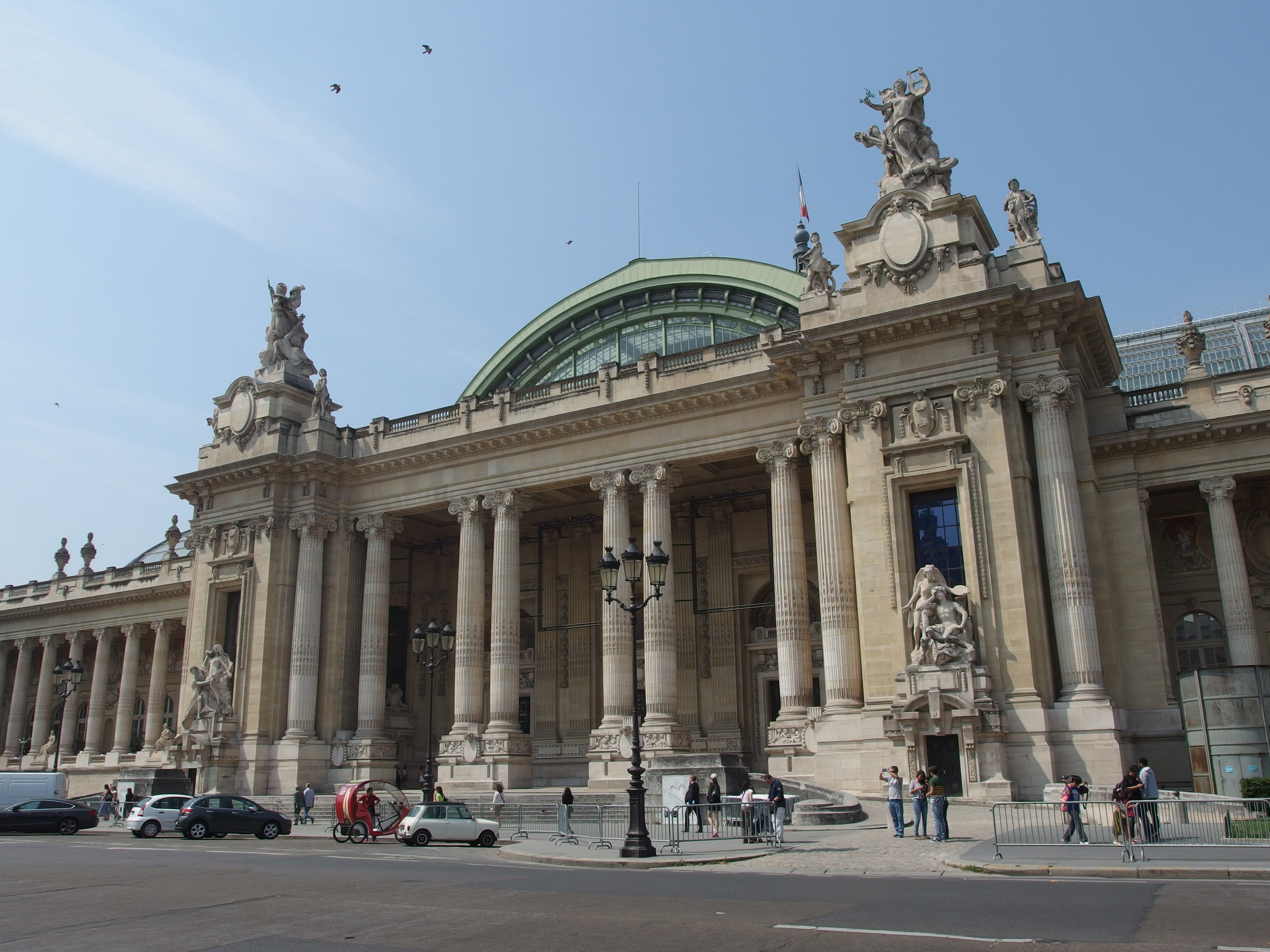
Grand Palais, Paris (1897–1900)

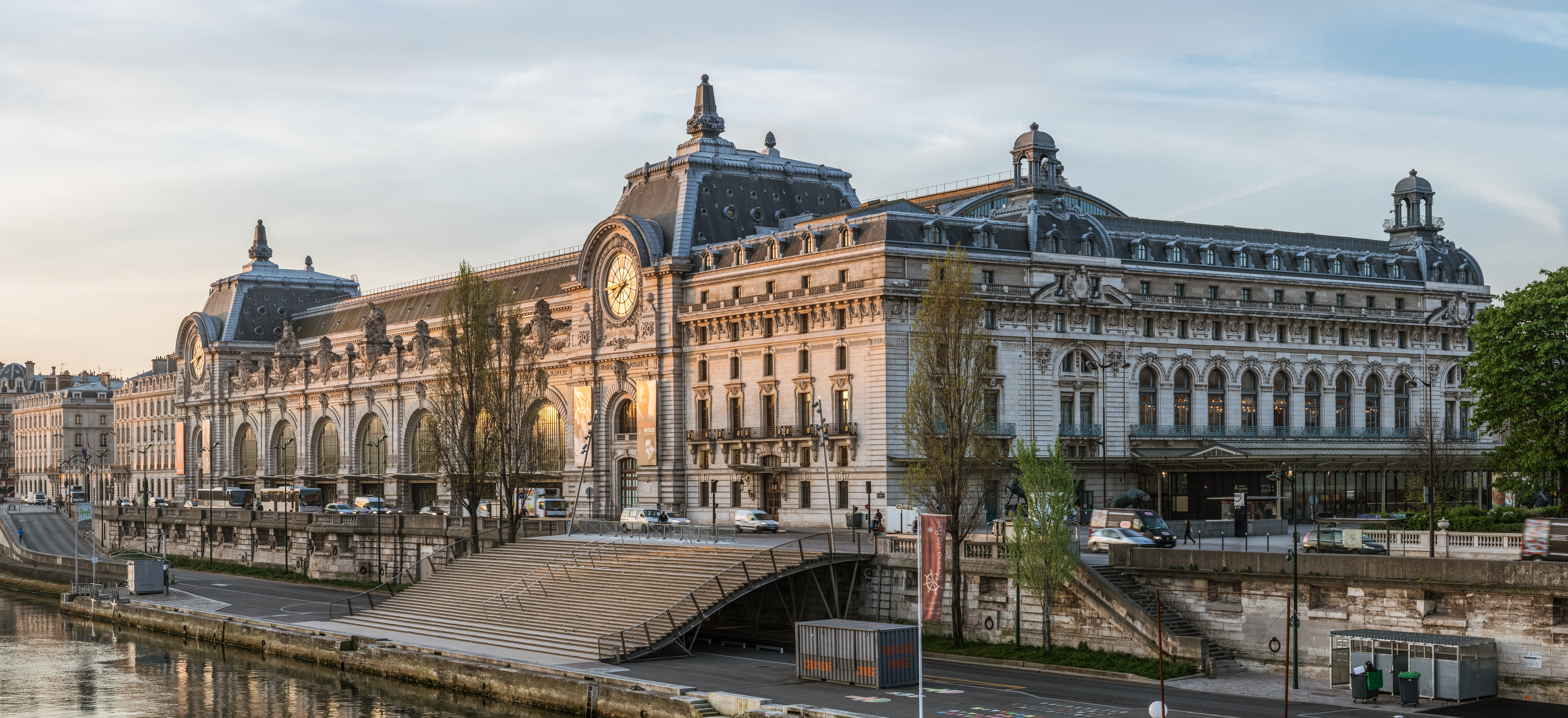
Gare d'Orsay, Paris (1900)

The Beaux-Arts style in France in the 19th century was initiated by four young architects trained at the École des Beaux-Arts, architects; Joseph-Louis Duc, Félix Duban, Henri Labrouste, and Léon Vaudoyer, who had first studied Roman and Greek architecture at the Villa Medici in Rome, then in the 1820s began the systematic study of other historic architectural styles, including French architecture of the Middle Ages and Renaissance. They instituted teaching about a variety of architectural styles at the École des Beaux-Arts, and installed fragments of Renaissance and Medieval buildings in the courtyard of the school so students could draw and copy them. Each of them also designed new non-classical buildings in Paris inspired by a variety of different historic styles: Labrouste built the Sainte-Geneviève Library (1844–1850), Duc designed the new Palais de Justice and Court of Cassation on the Île de la Cité (1852–1868), Vaudroyer designed the Conservatoire national des arts et métiers (1838–1867), and Duban designed the new buildings of the École des Beaux-Arts. Together, these buildings, drawing upon Renaissance, Gothic and Romanesque and other non-classical styles, broke the monopoly of neoclassical architecture in Paris.

==== Germany ====
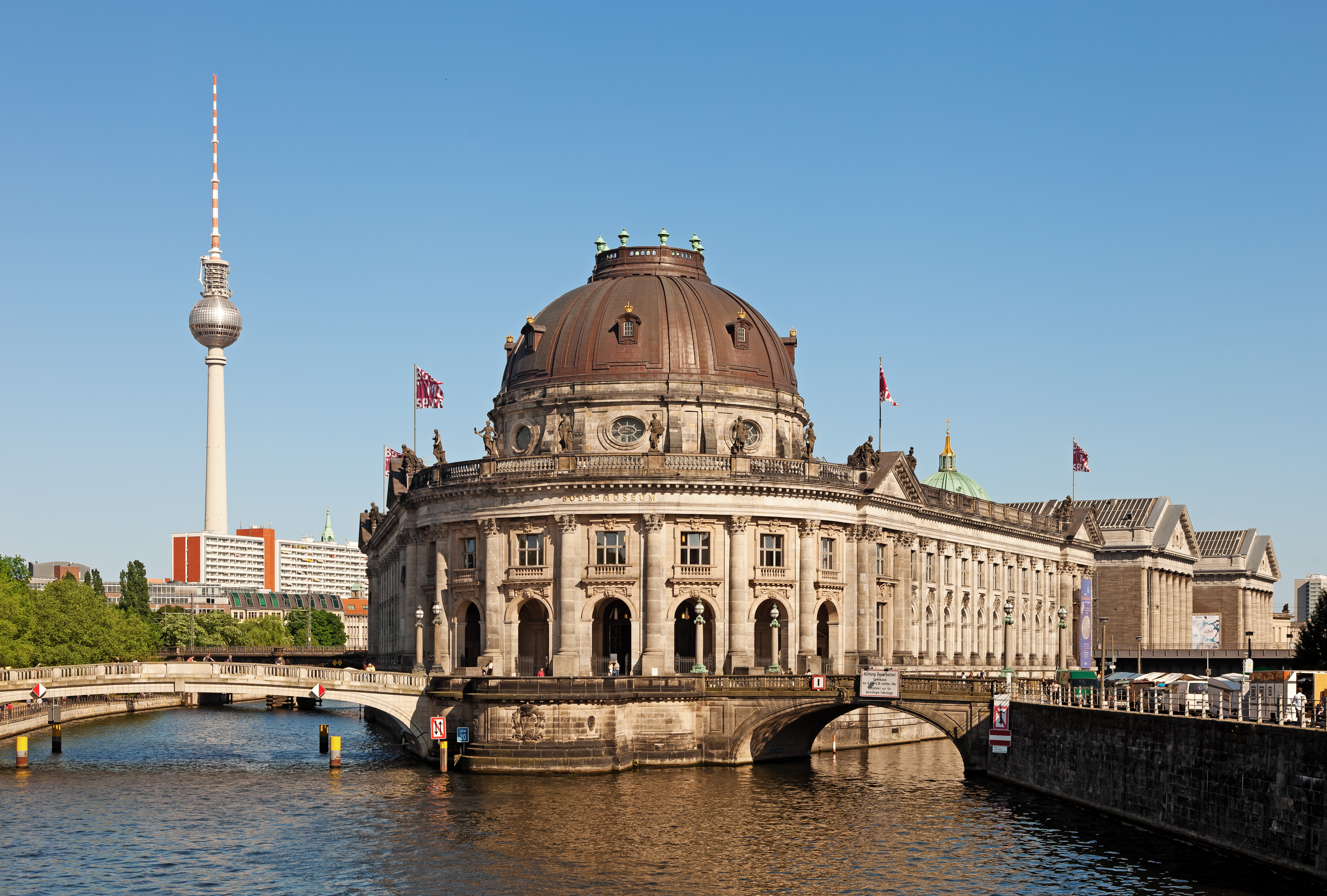
Bode Museum, Berlin

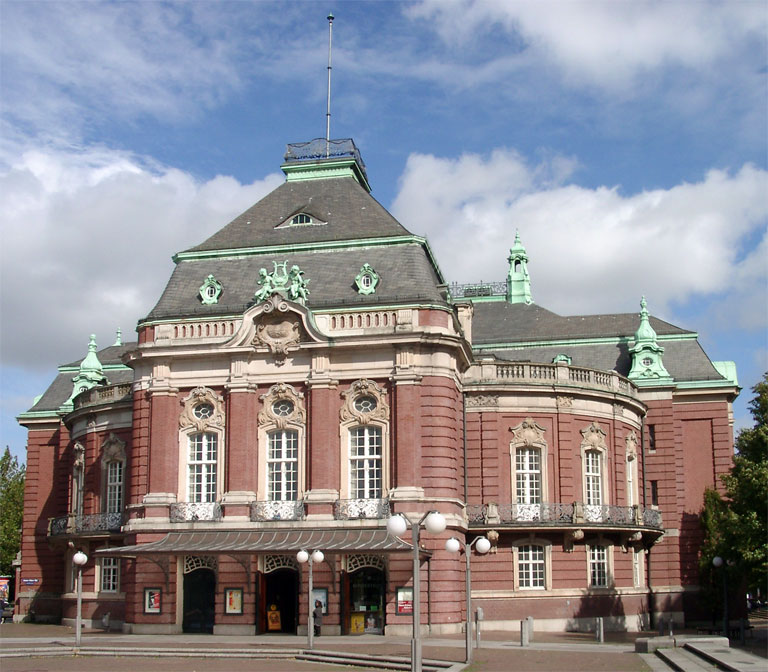
Laeiszhalle, Hamburg

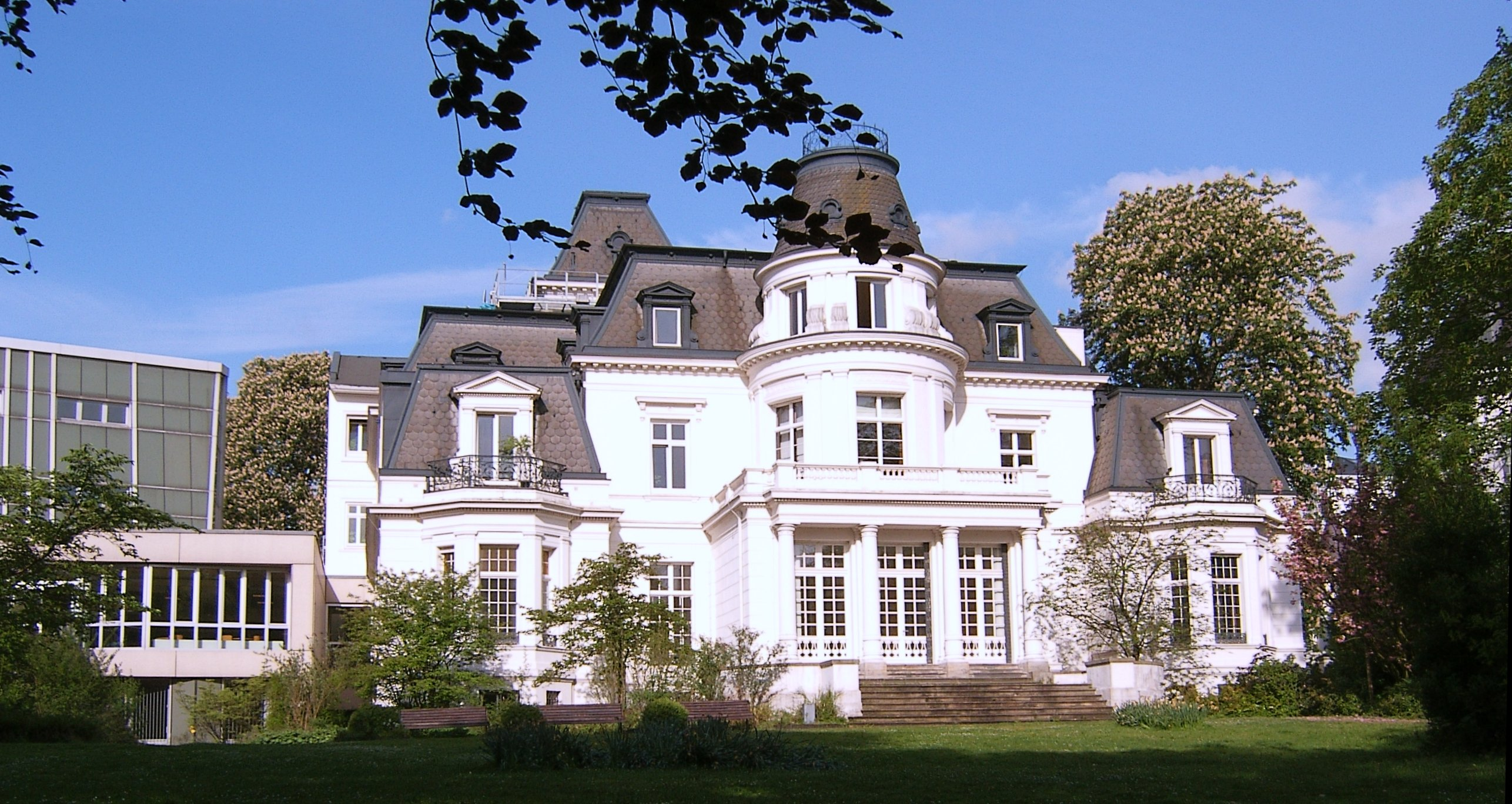
Hochschule für Musik und Theater Hamburg, Hamburg

Germany is one of the countries where the Beaux-Arts style was well received, along with Baroque Revival architecture. The style was especially popular and most prominently featured in the then Kingdom of Prussia during the German Empire. The best example of Beaux-Arts buildings in Germany today are the Bode Museum in Berlin, and the Laeiszhalle and Hochschule für Musik und Theater Hamburg in Hamburg.

===== Beaux-Arts buildings in Germany =====
- 1898–1904: Bode Museum, Berlin
- 1904–1908: Laeiszhalle, Hamburg
- 1888–1913: Hochschule für Musik und Theater Hamburg, Hamburg

==== Hungary ====
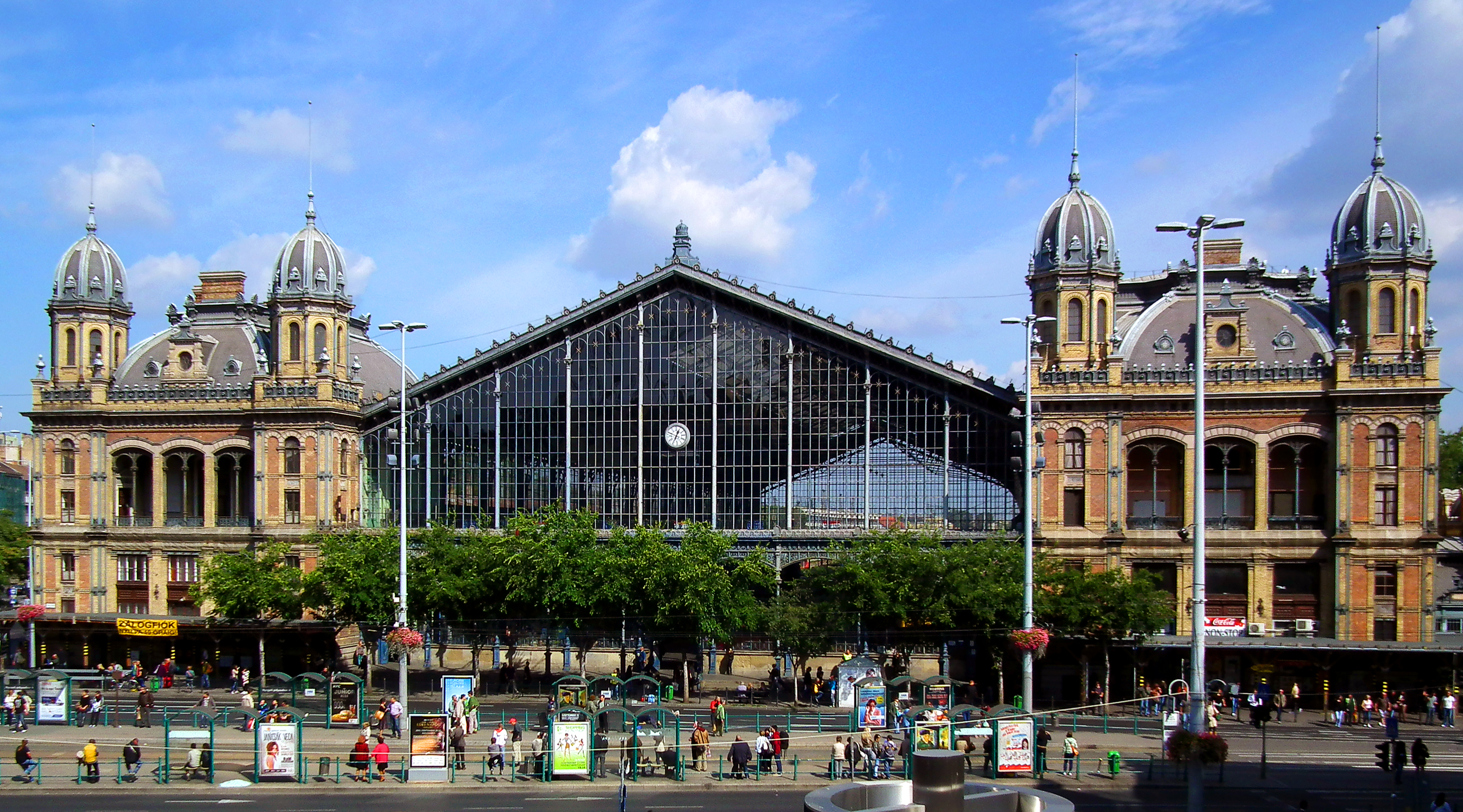
Budapest Nyugati station, Budapest

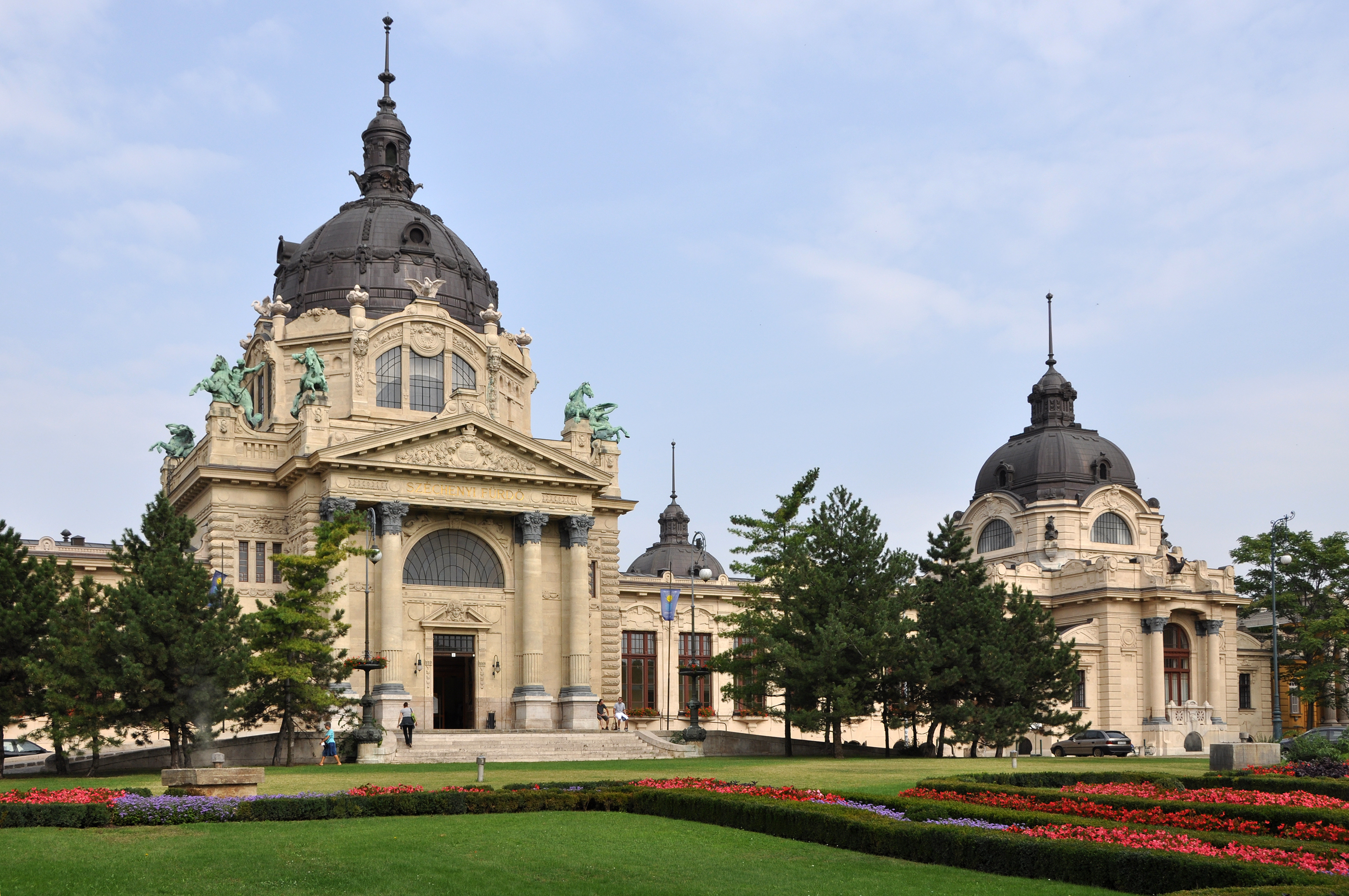
Széchenyi Medicinal Bath, Budapest

===== Beaux-Arts buildings in Hungary =====
- 1875–1877: Budapest Nyugati station, Budapest
- 1913: Széchenyi thermal bath, Budapest

==== Italy ====
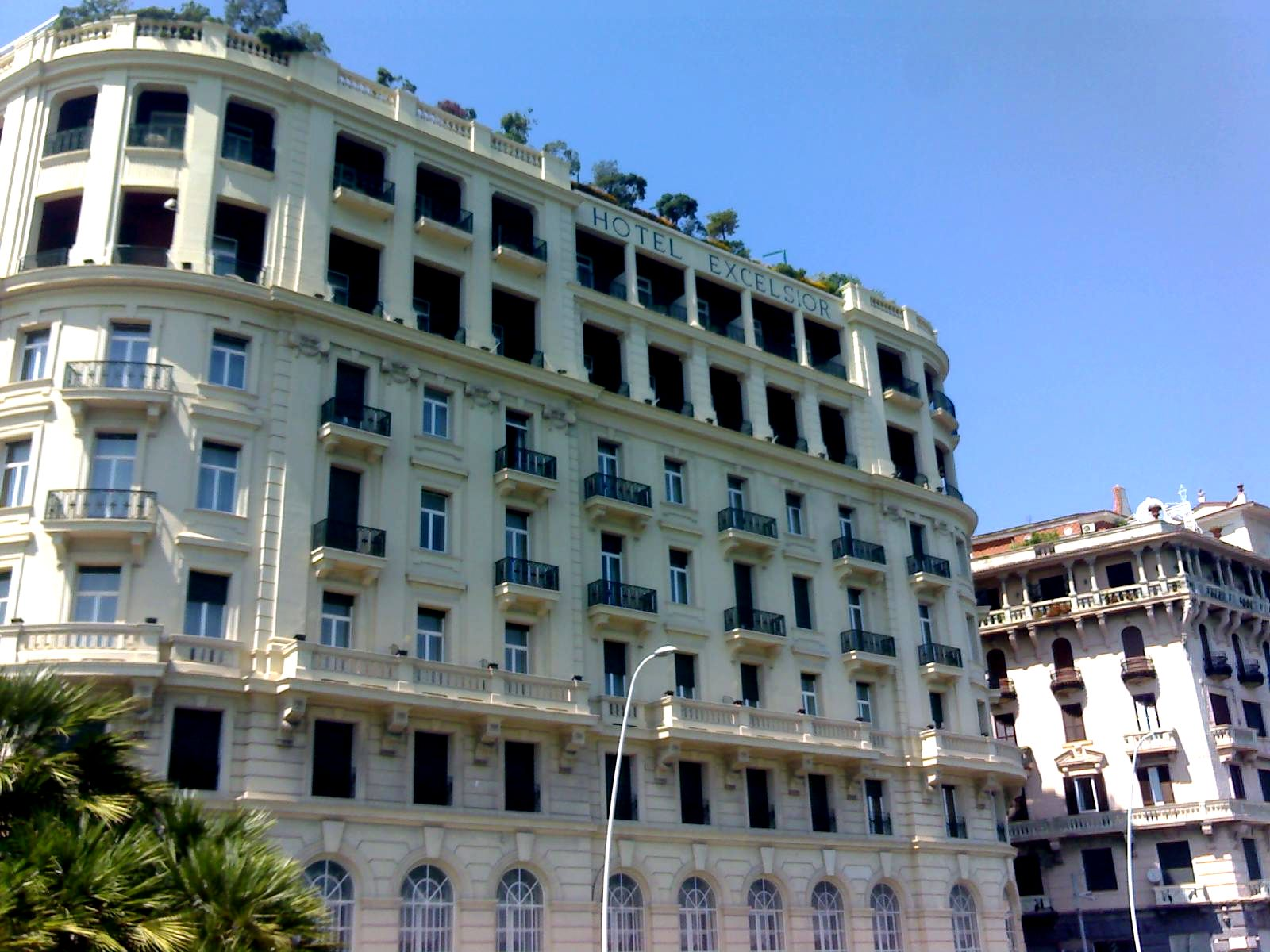
Hotel Excelsior, Naples

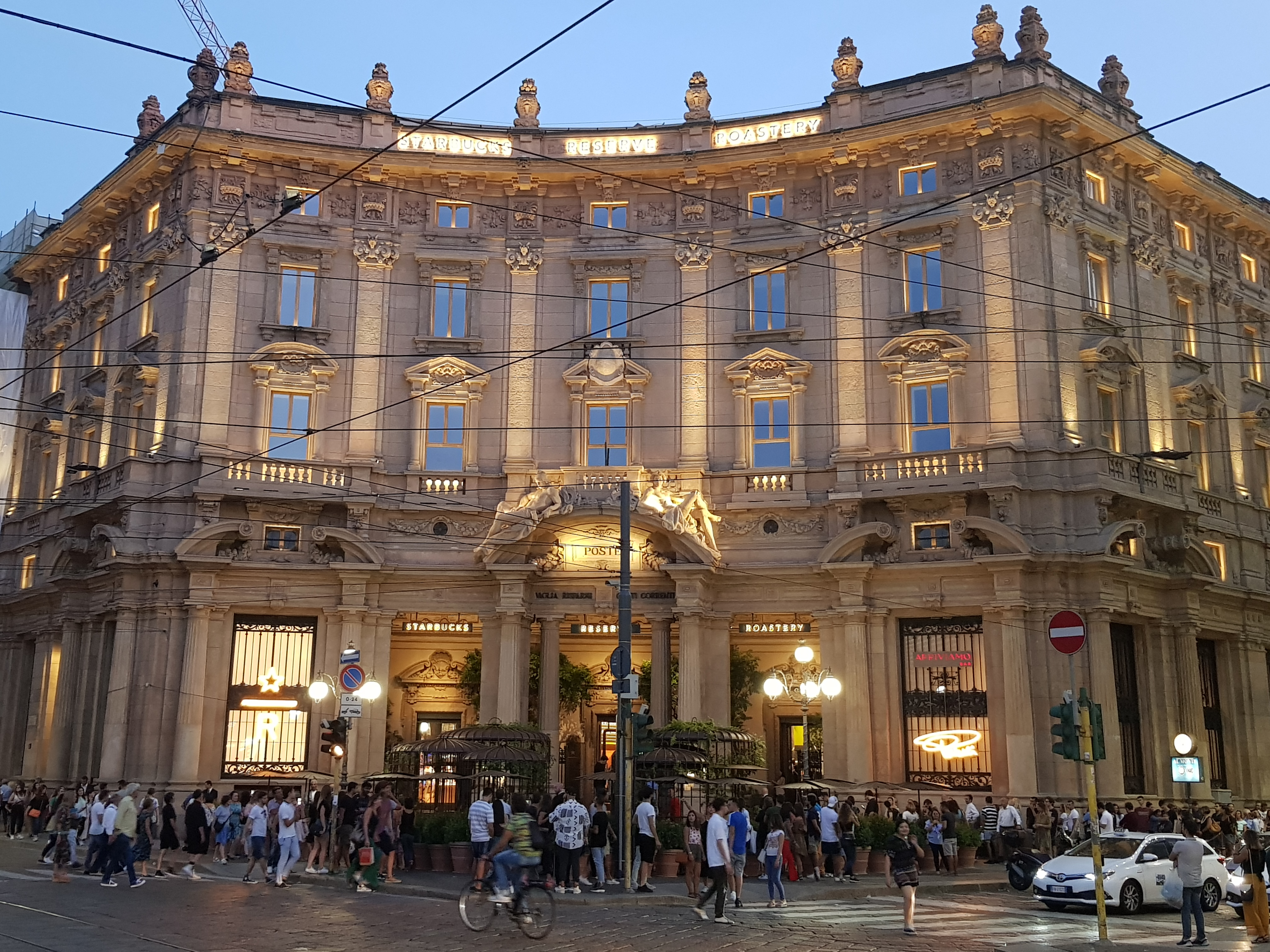
Palazzo Broggi, Milan

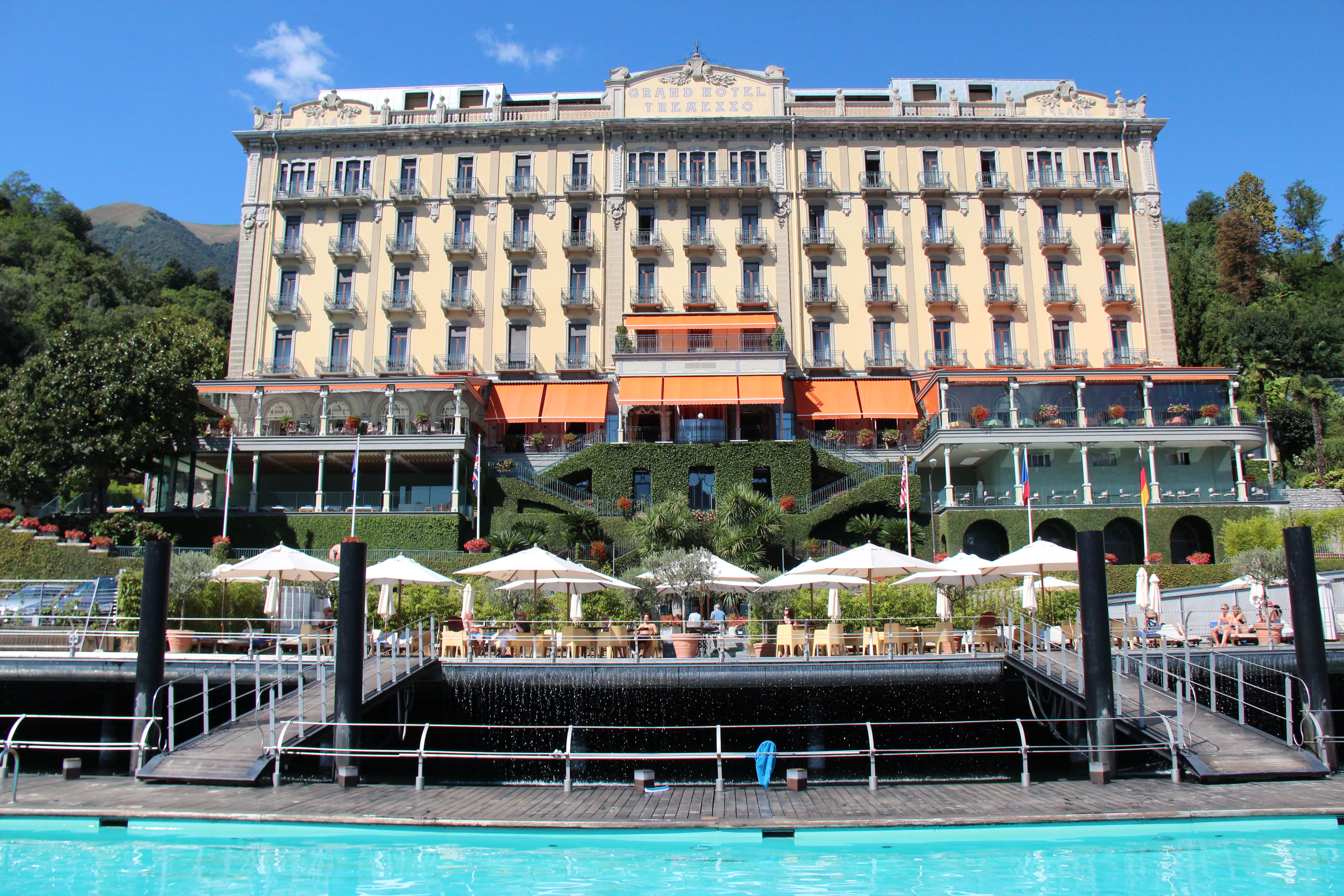
Grand Hotel Tremezzo, Como Lake

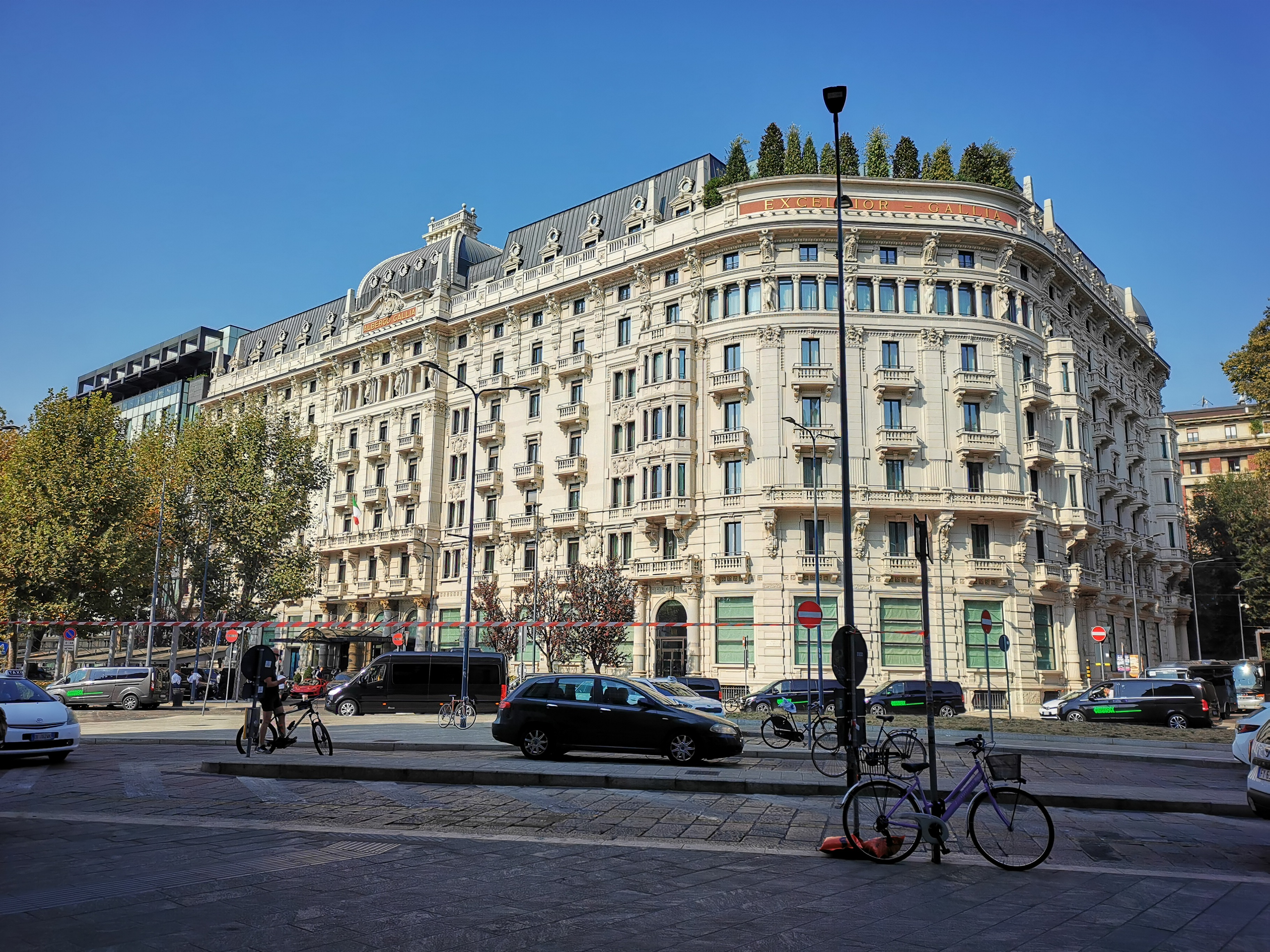
Hotel Gallia, Milan

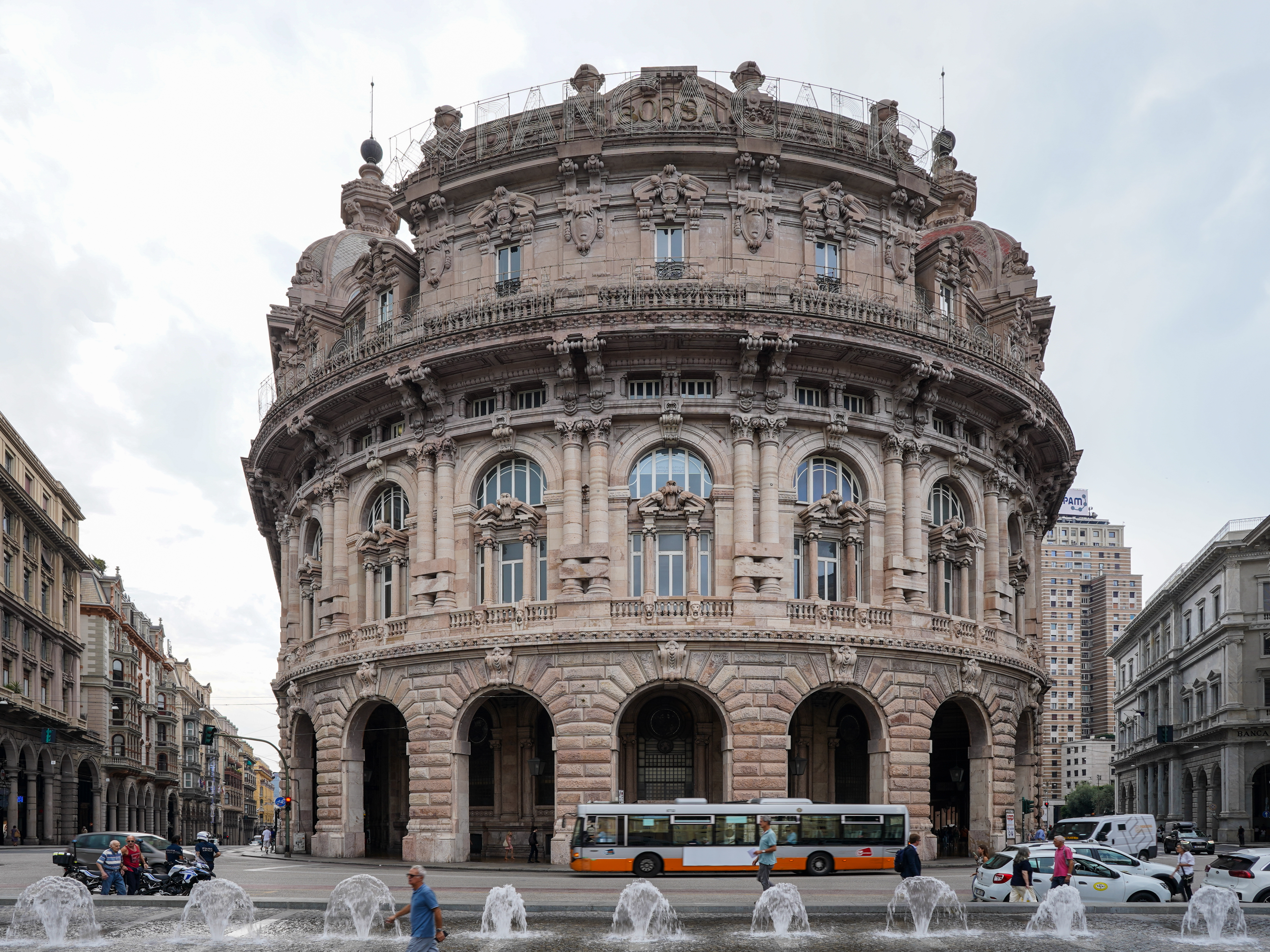
Genoa Stock Exchange, Genoa

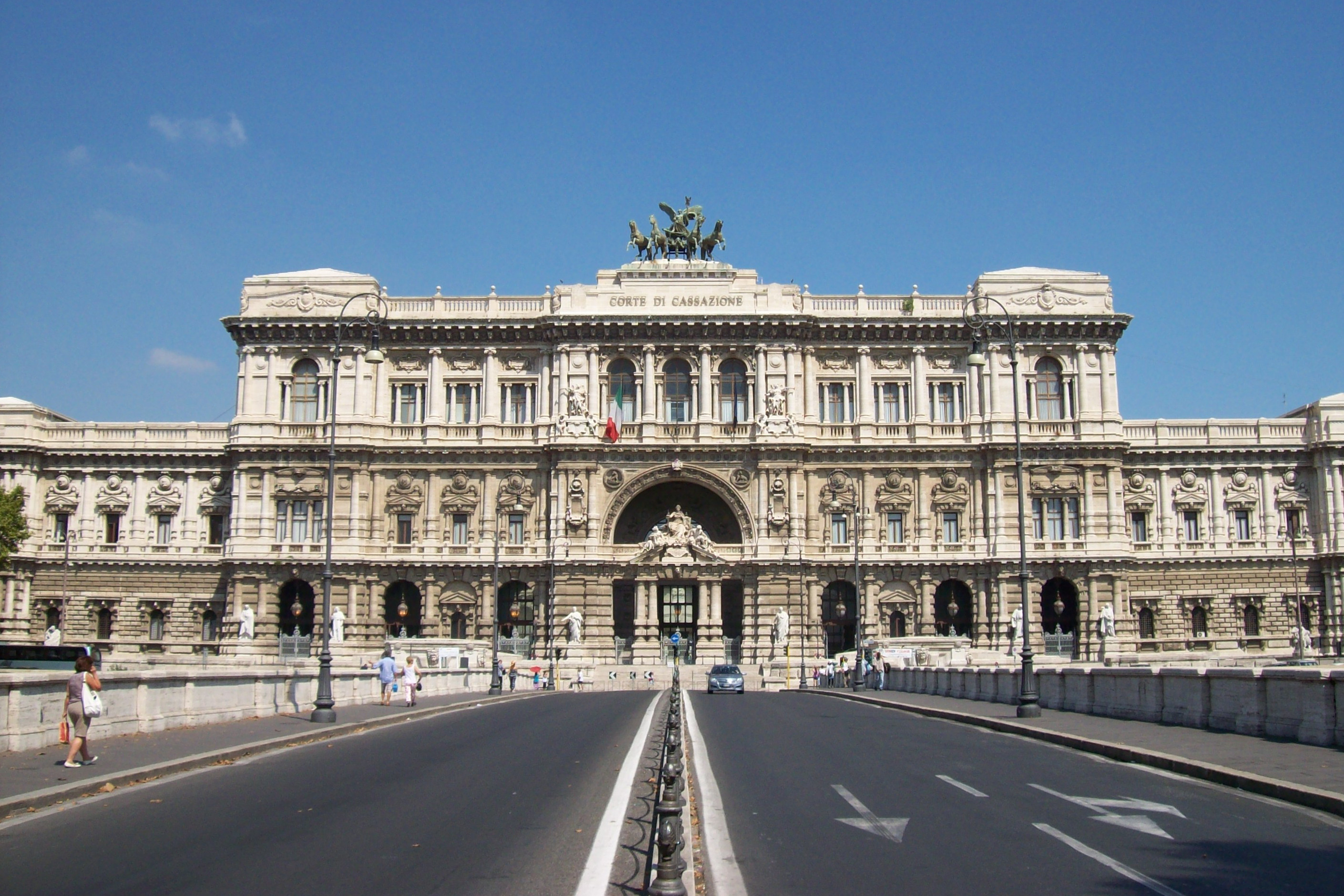
Palace of Justice, Rome

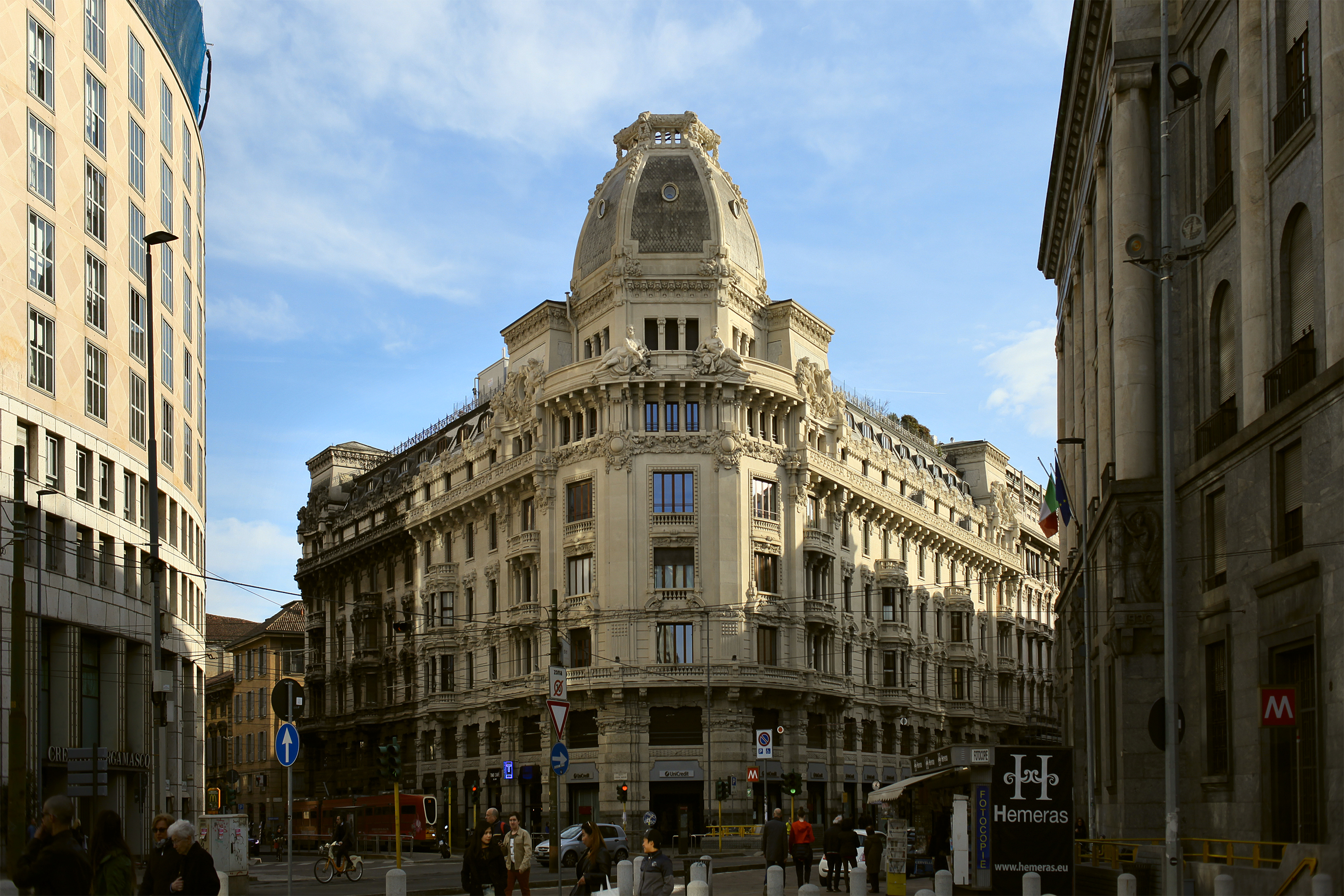
Palazzo Meroni, Milan

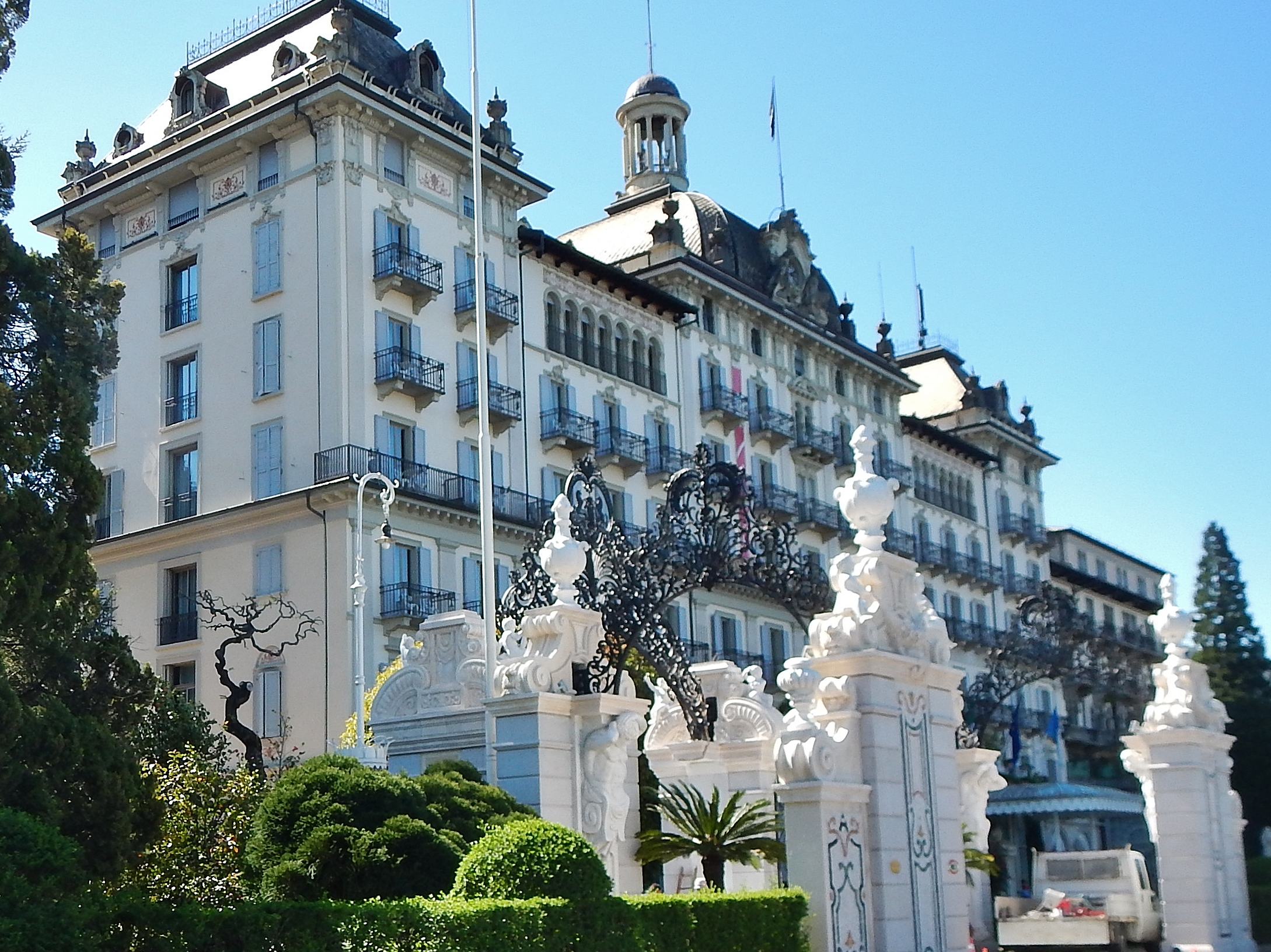
Grand Hotel Des Iles Borromees, Stresa, Maggiore Lake

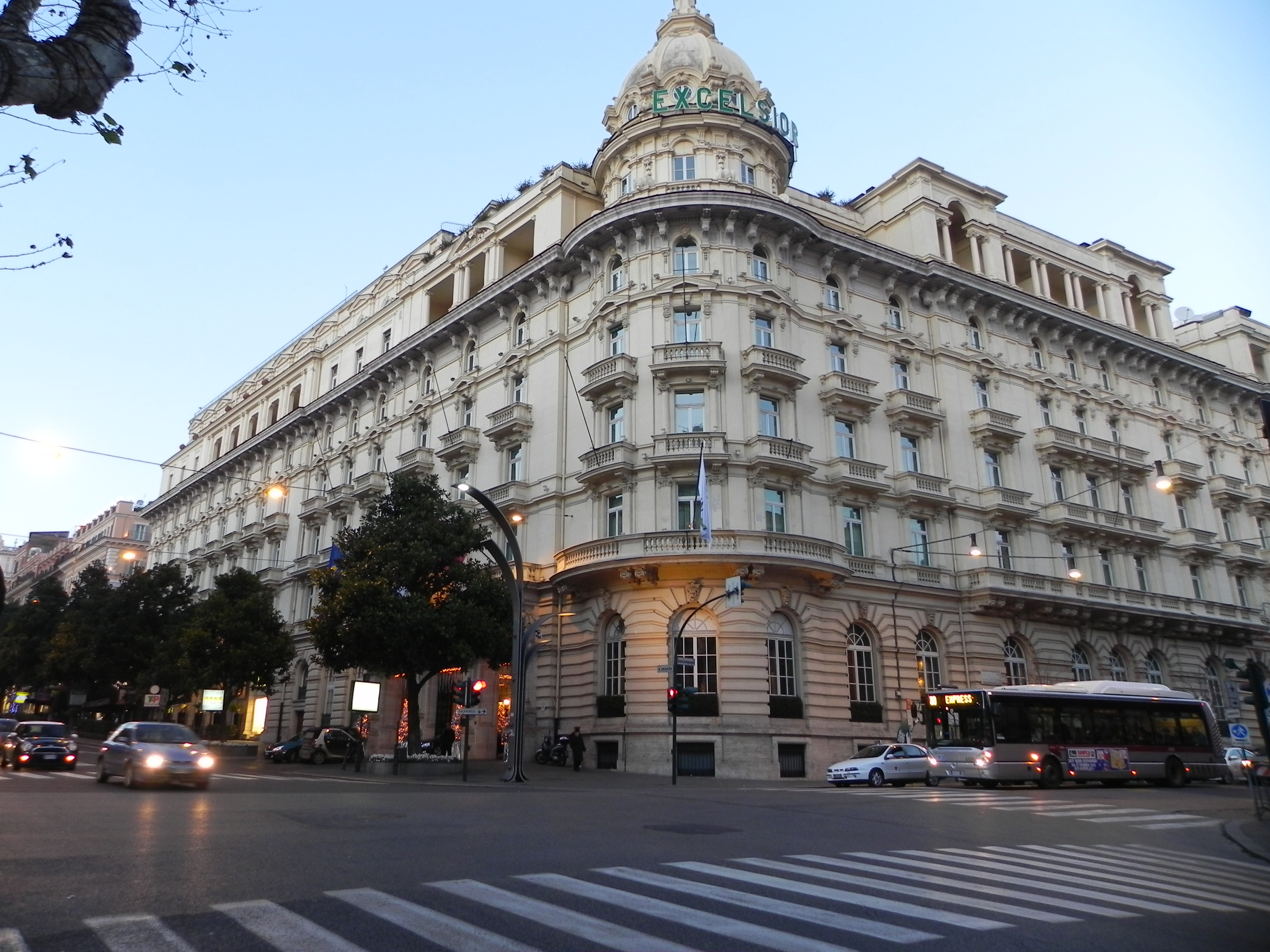
The Westin Excelsior, Rome

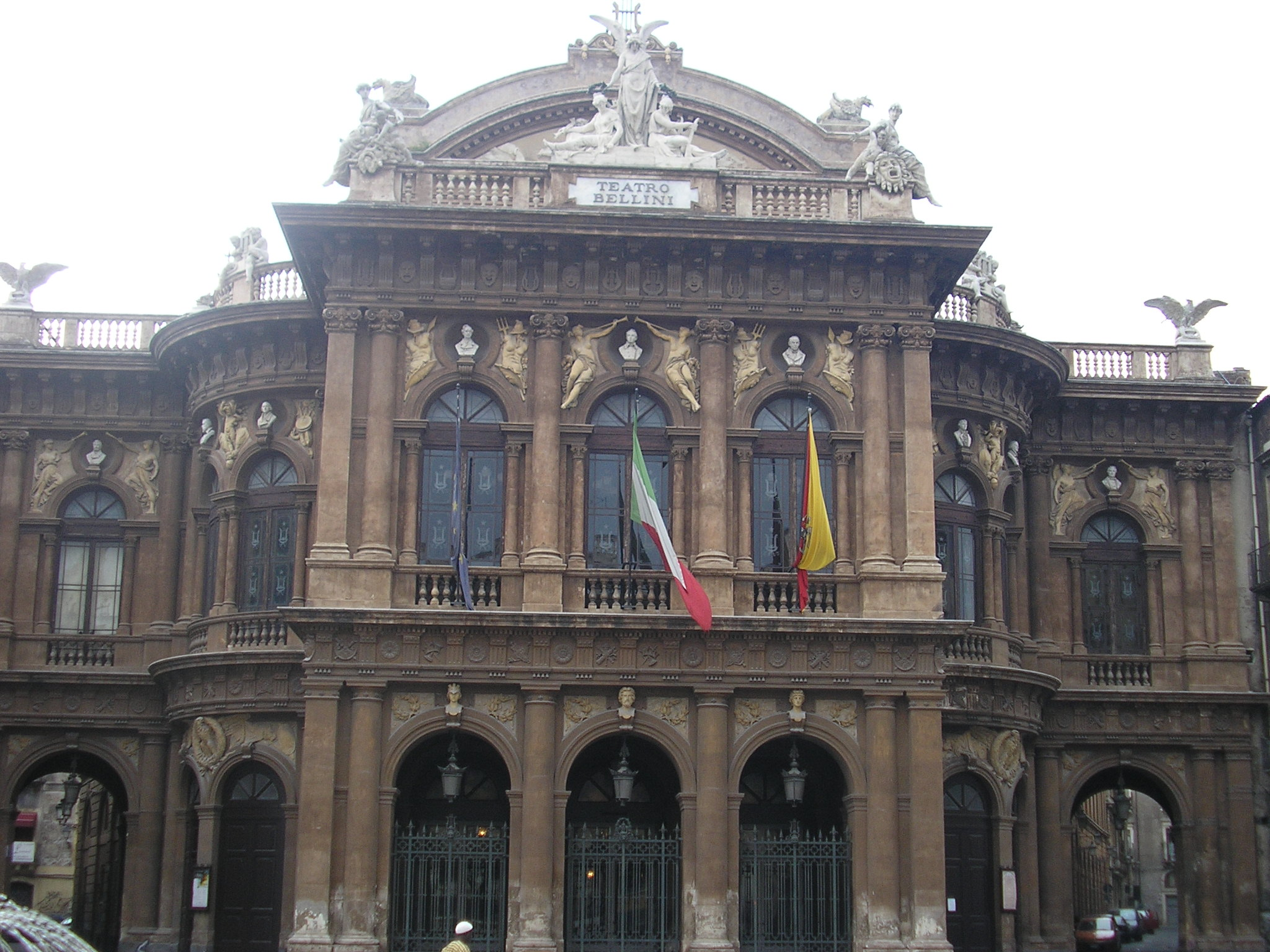
Teatro Bellini, Catania

===== Beaux-Arts buildings in Italy =====
- 1890: Galleria Umberto I, Naples
- 1894: Palazzo delle Poste, Trieste
- 1897: Palazzo delle Assicurazioni Generali, Milan
- 1901: Palazzo Broggi (ex Poste), Milan
- 1908: Hotel Excelsior, Naples
- 1911: Palazzo della Banca Commerciale Italiana, Milan
- 1912: Palazzo della Borsa Valori, Genoa
- 1912: Palazzo delle Poste, Livorno
- 1912: Palazzo della Camera di Commercio, Taranto
- 1913: Palazzo della Cassa di Risparmio, Ravenna
- 1914-1926: Palazzo Meroni, Milan
- 1920: Palazzo delle Poste, Palermo
- 1927: Palazzo della Banca d'Italia, Verona
- 1931: Stazione Centrale, Milan
- 1933: Palazzo delle Poste, La Spezia
- 1936: Palazzo della Provincia, Bari

HOTELS

- 1863: Grand Hotel des Iles Borromées, Stresa
- 1894: Grand Hotel Villa d'Este, Cernobbio
- 1898: Grand Hotel des Bains, Venice
- 1899: Grand Hotel Excelsior Vittoria, Sorrento
- 1901: Grand Hotel Majestic (già Baglioni), Bologna
- 1906: Grand Hotel Tremezzo, Tremezzo
- 1906: The Welstin Excelsior, Rome
- 1908: Grand Hotel Excelsior, Venice
- 1910: Grand Hotel et de Milan, Milan
- 1913: Hotel Villa Igea (già Grand Hotel Villa Igiea), Palermo
- 1914: Hotel Danieli (ristrutturazione in stile), Venice
- 1925: Excelsior Hotel Gallia, Milan

==== Netherlands ====
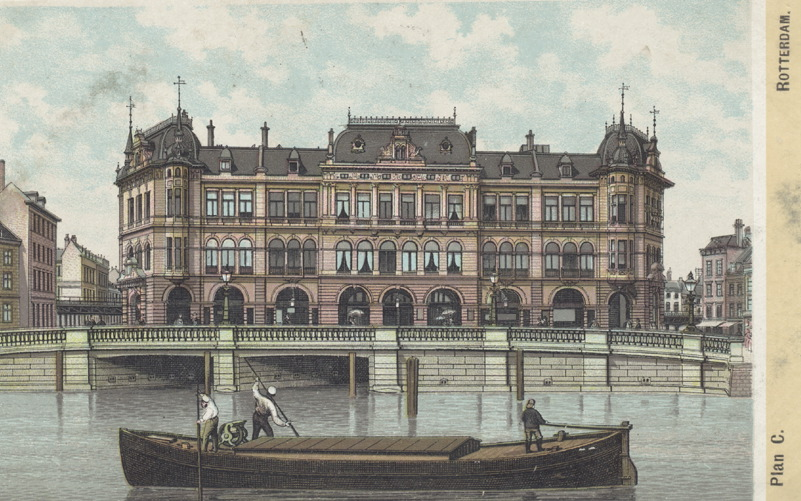
Plan C, Rotterdam

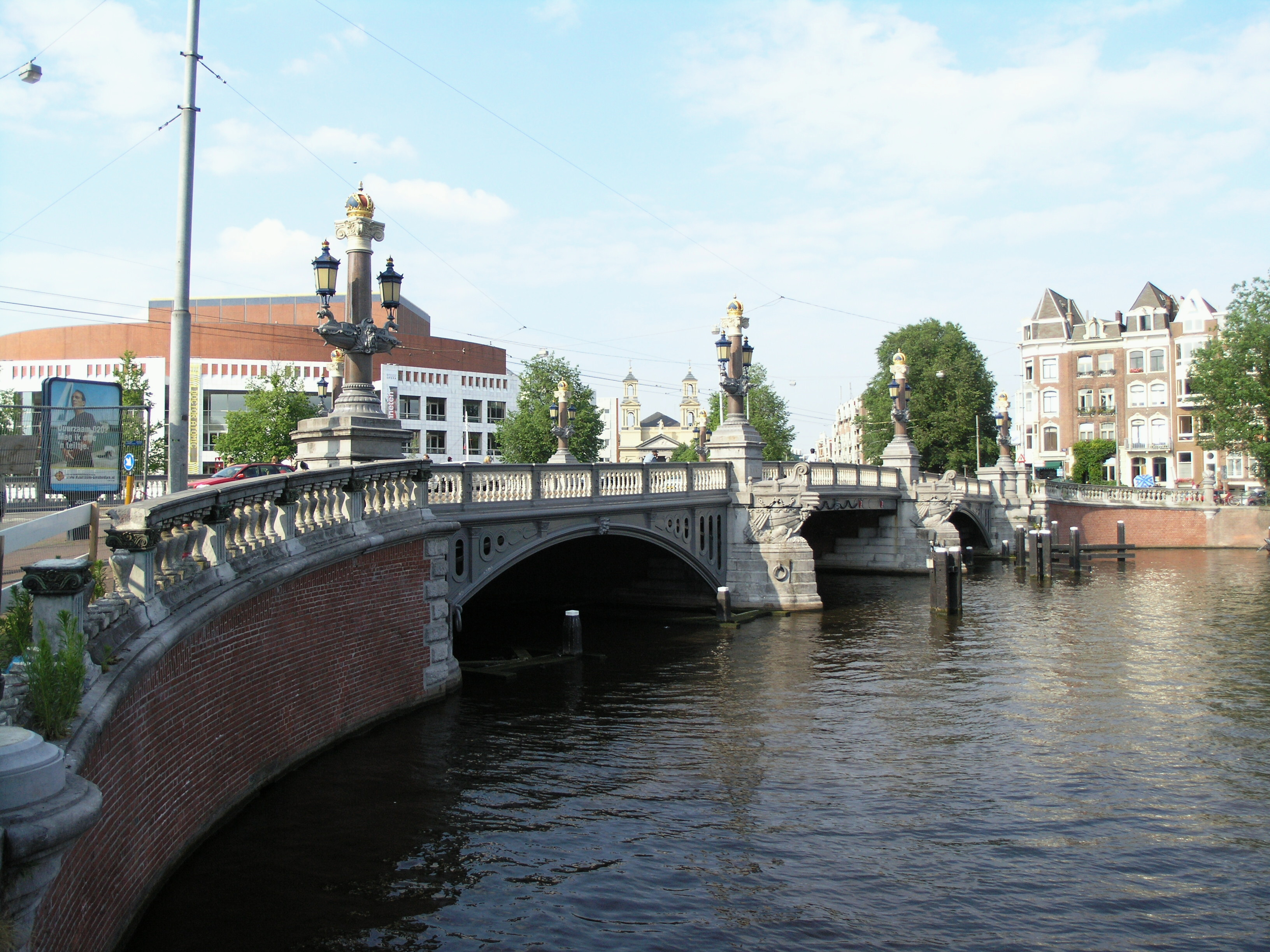
Blauwbrug, Amsterdam

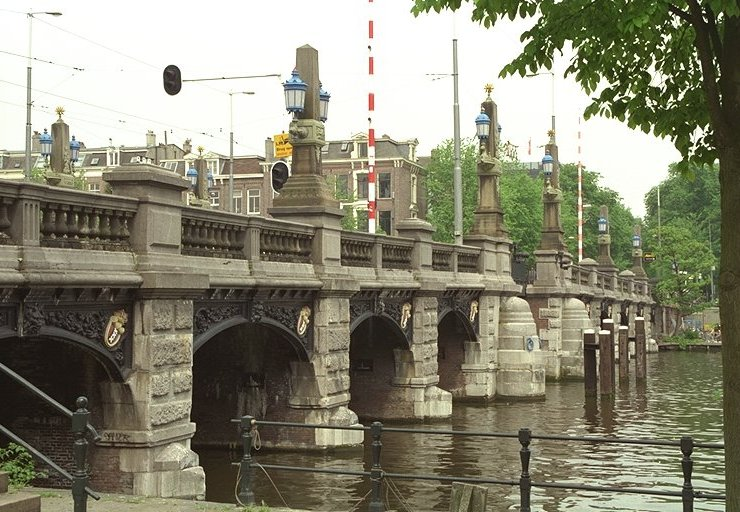
Hogesluis, Amsterdam

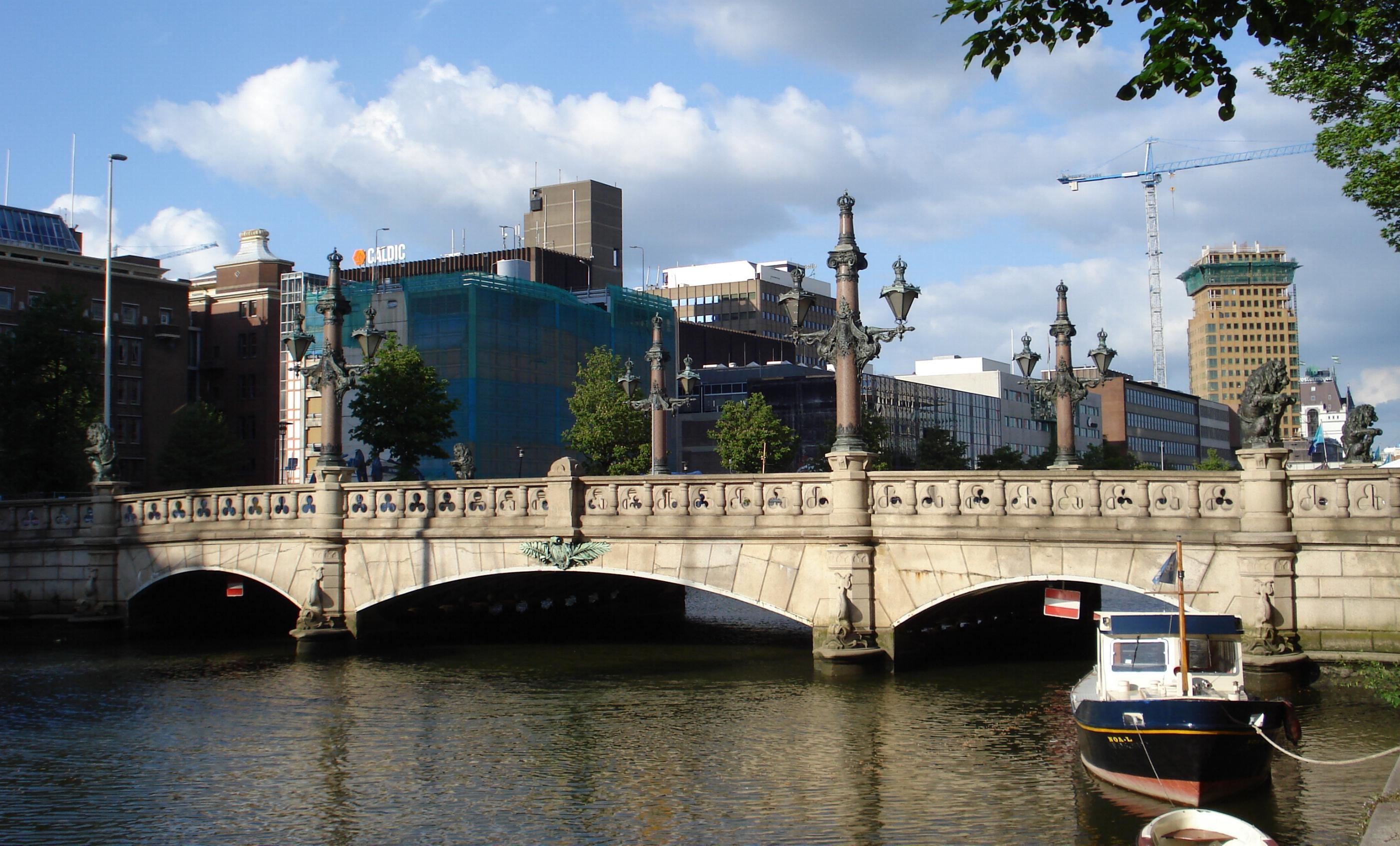
Regentessebrug, Rotterdam

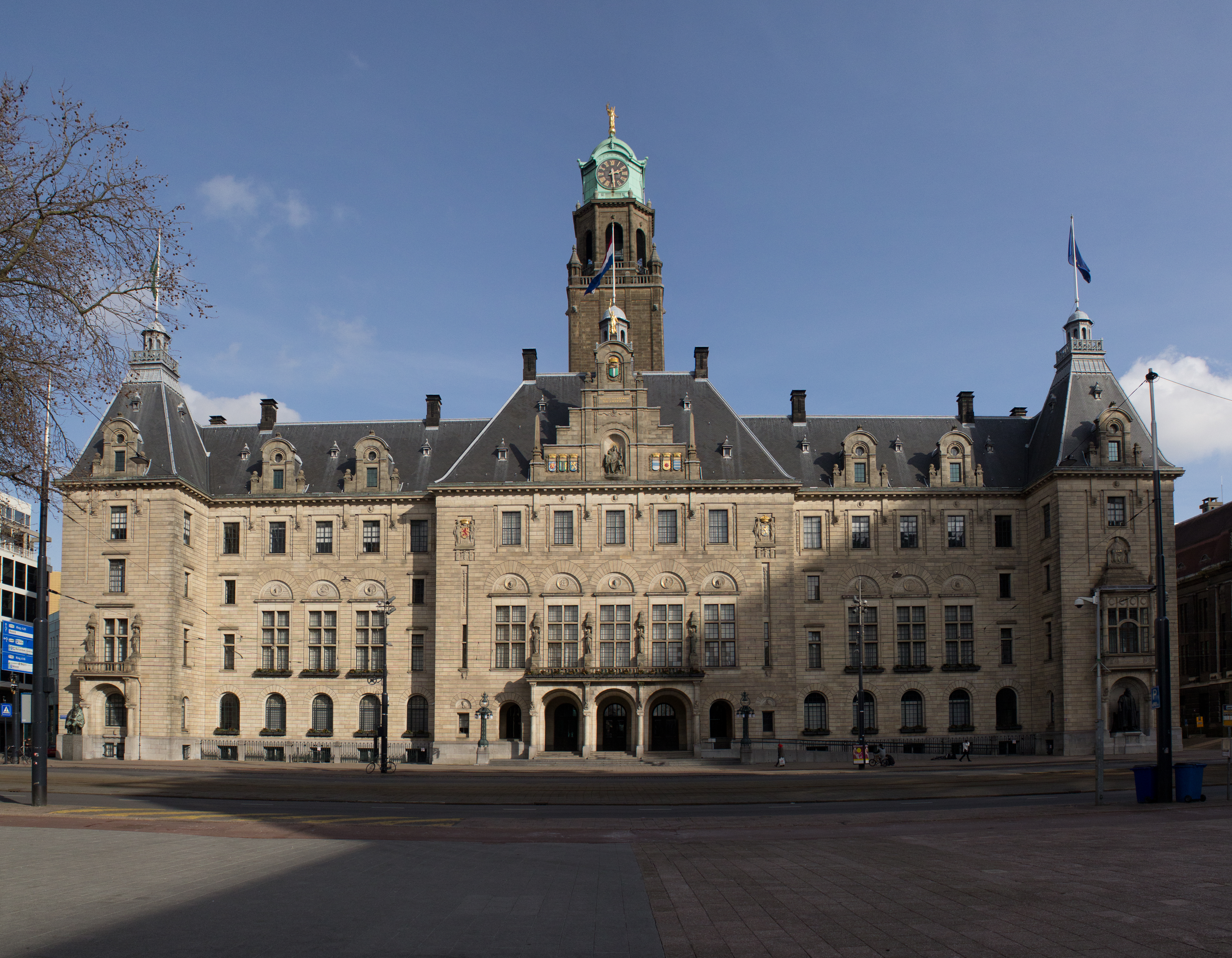
City hall, Rotterdam

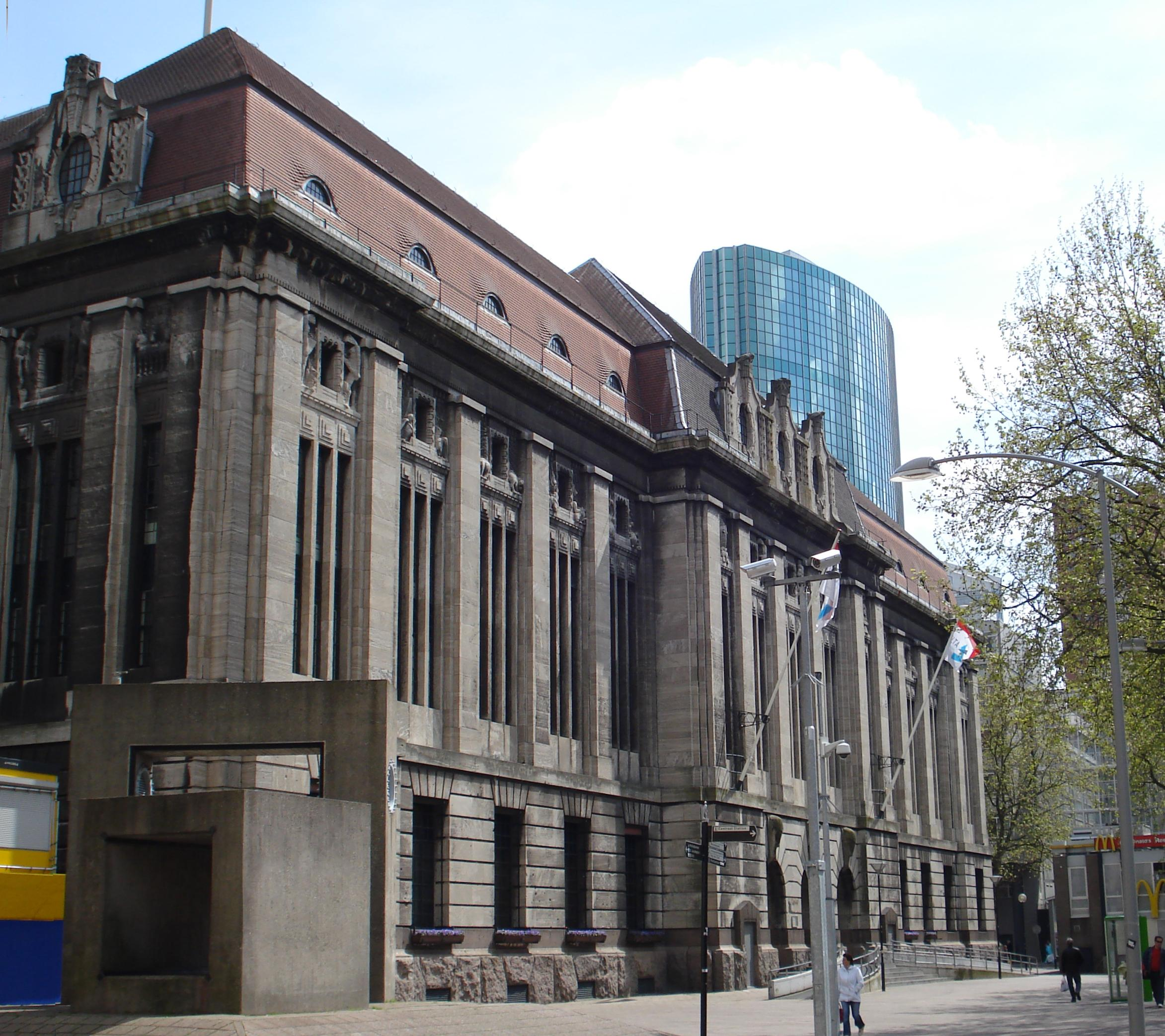
Former General Post Office, Rotterdam

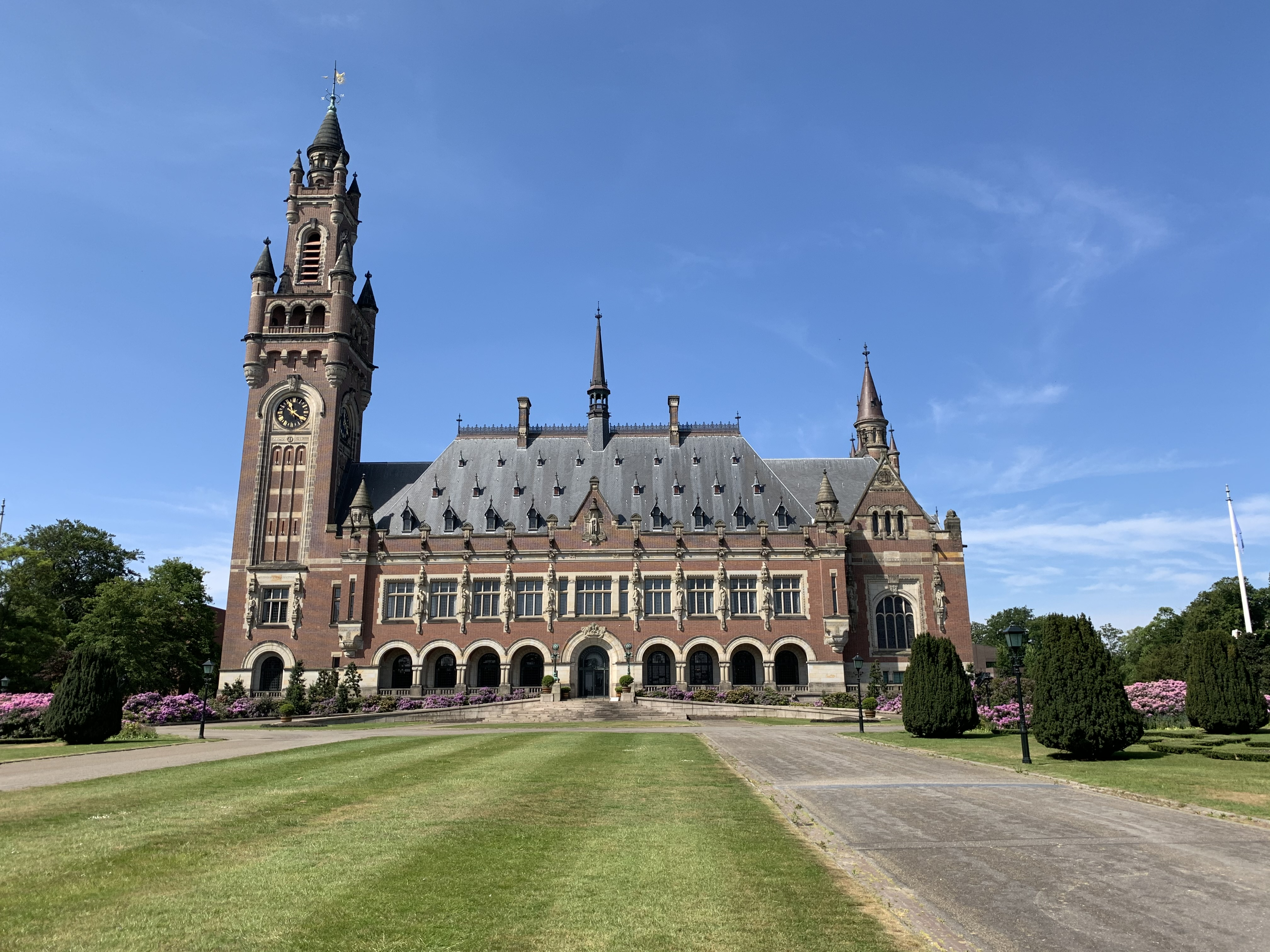
Peace Palace, The Hague

Compared to other countries like France and Germany, the Beaux-Arts style never really became prominent in the Netherlands. However, a handful of significant buildings have nonetheless been made in this style during the period of 1880 to 1920, mainly being built in the cities of Rotterdam, Amsterdam and The Hague.

===== Beaux-Arts buildings in the Netherlands =====
- 1880–1889: Plan C, Rotterdam (destroyed during the German bombing of Rotterdam in 1940)
- 1883: Blauwbrug, Amsterdam
- 1883: Hogesluis, Amsterdam
- 1898: Regentessebrug, Rotterdam
- 1907–1913: Peace Palace, The Hague
- 1914–1920: Rotterdam City Hall (partially damaged during the Rotterdam Blitz of 1940 but later restored)
- 1915–1923: Former General Post Office, Rotterdam (partially damaged during the Rotterdam Blitz of 1940 but later restored)

==== Portugal ====
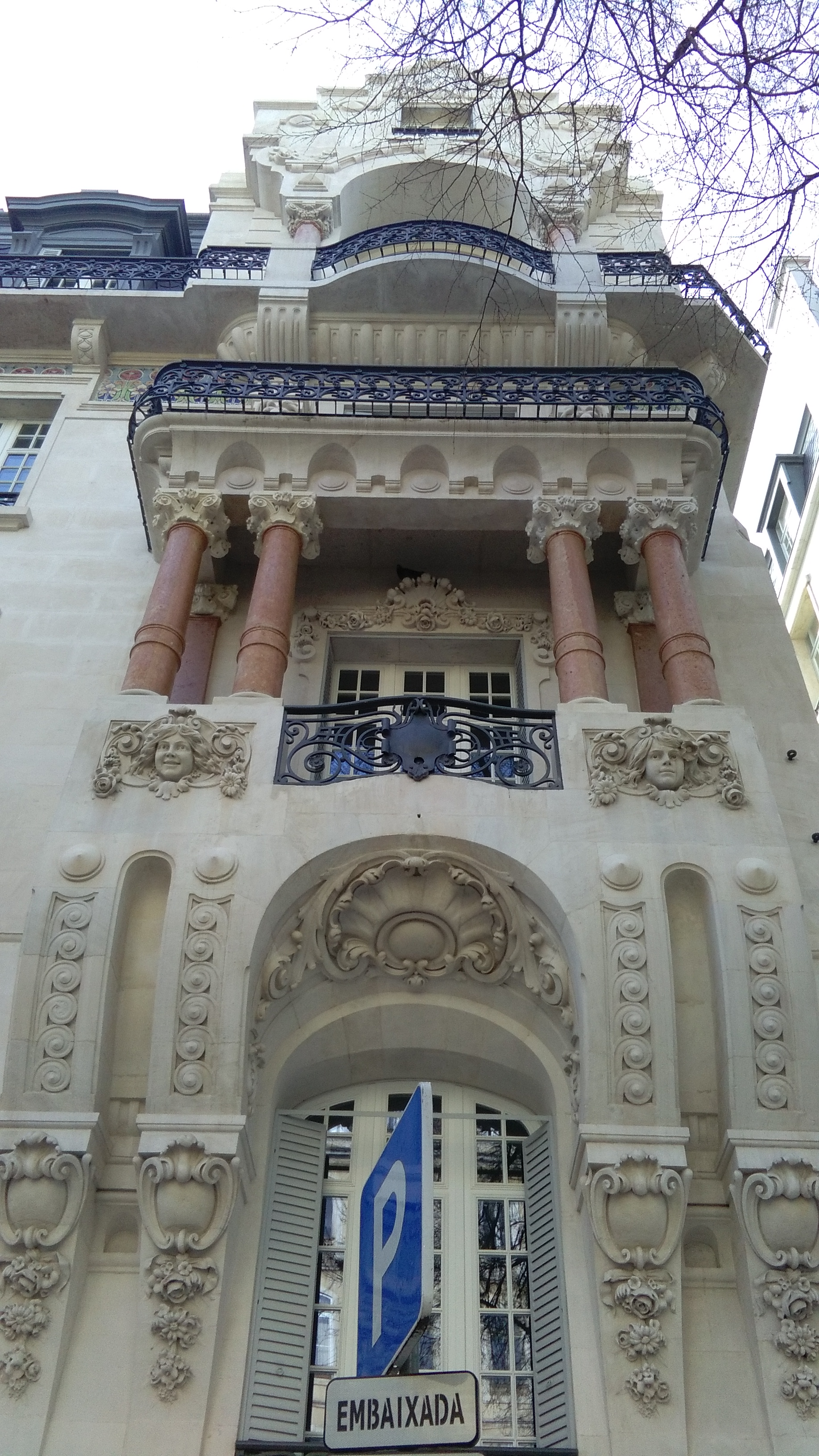
Edifício na Rua Alexandre Herculano, Lisbon

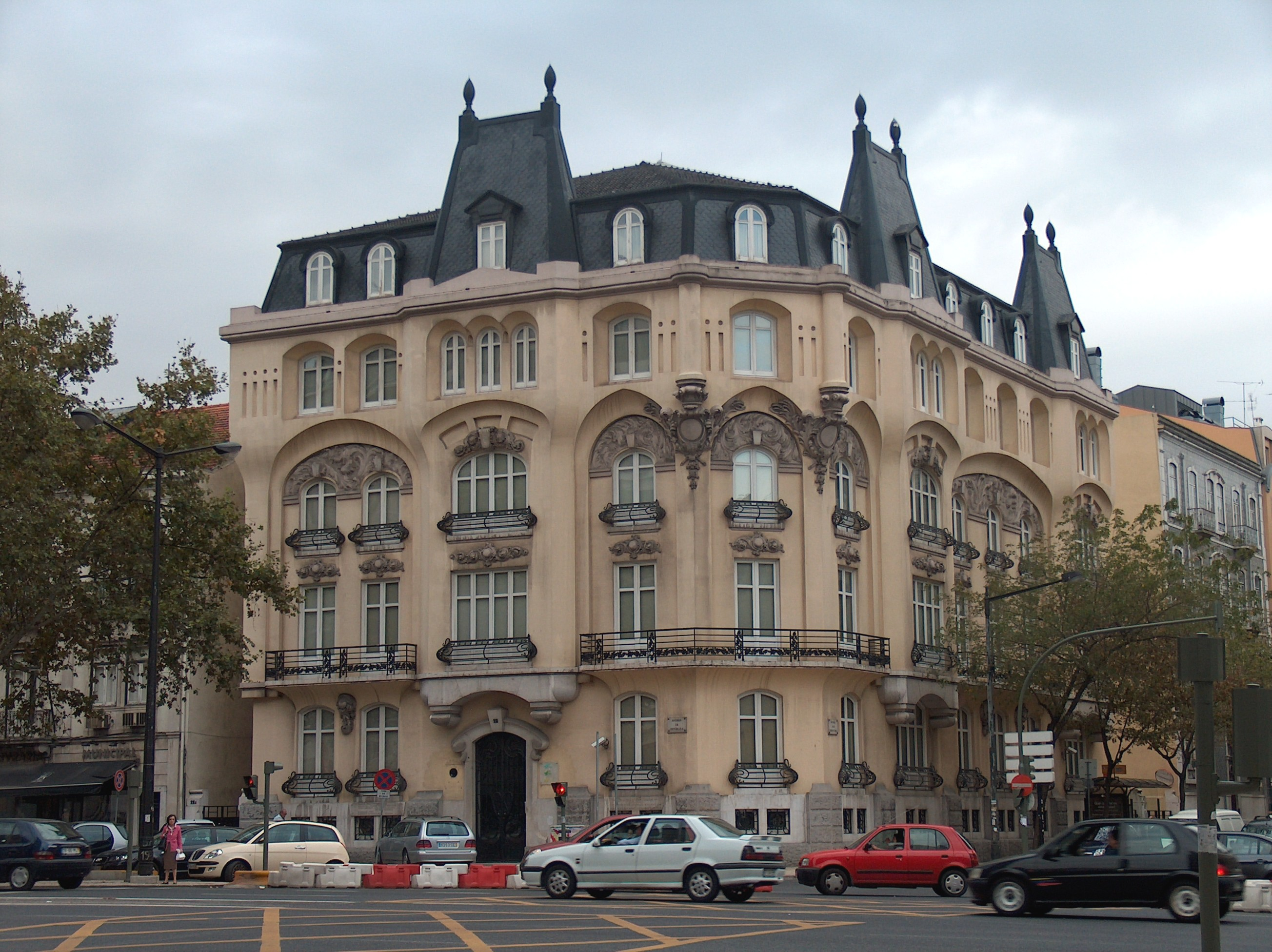
Edifício de Gaveto, Lisbon

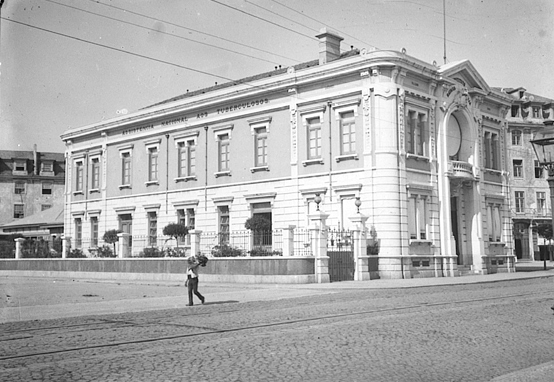
Instituto Central da Assistência Nacional aos Tuberculosos, Lisbon

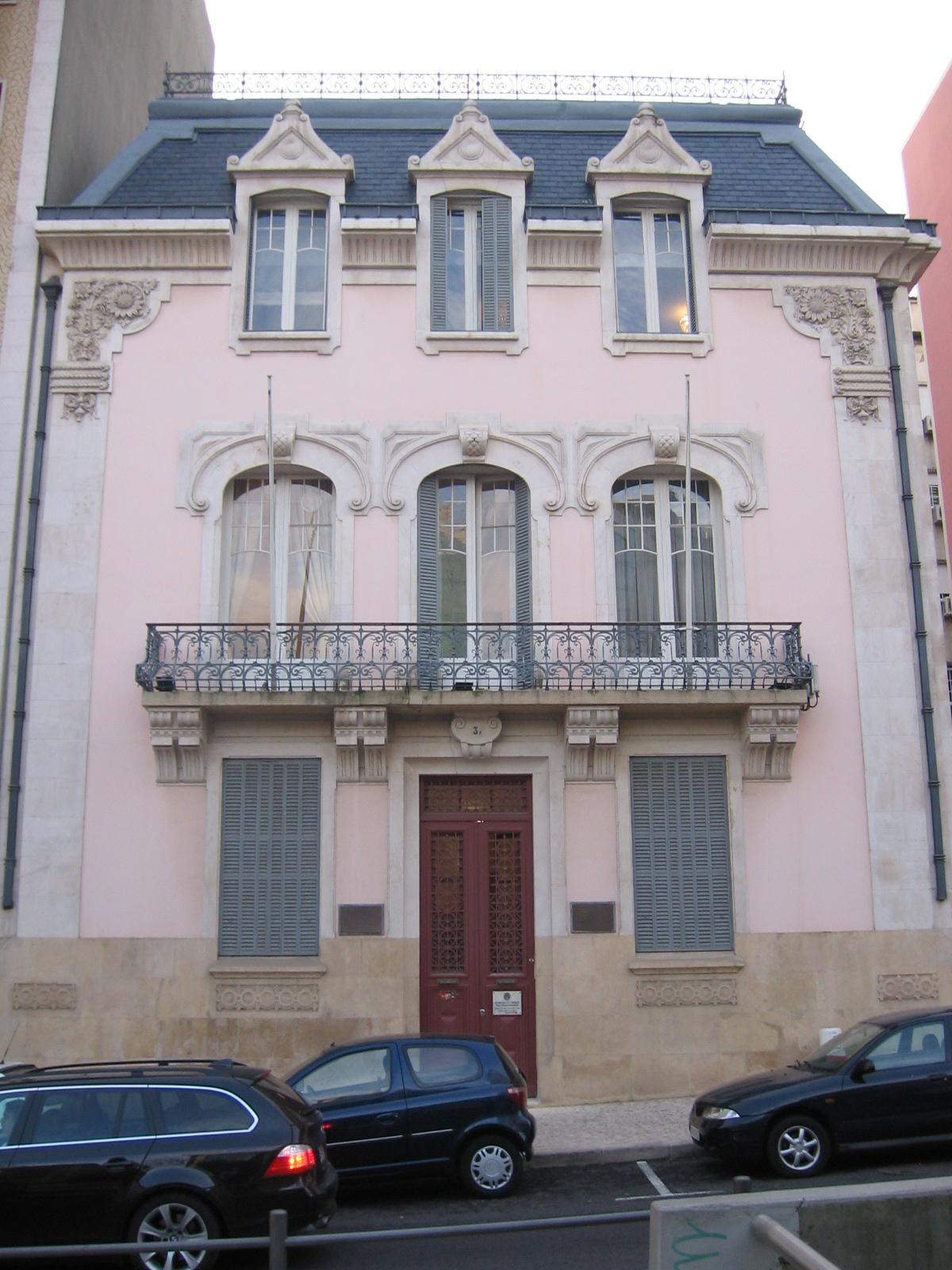
Sede da Ordem dos Engenheiros, Lisbon

===== Beaux-Arts buildings in Portugal =====
- 1909–1911: Building on Rua Alexandre Herculano, 25-25A, Lisbon
- 1912: Headquarters of the Orders of Engineers, Lisbon
- 1913: Gaveto Building, Lisbon
- Central Institute of National Assistance to Tuberculosis Portugal, Lisbon

==== Romania ====
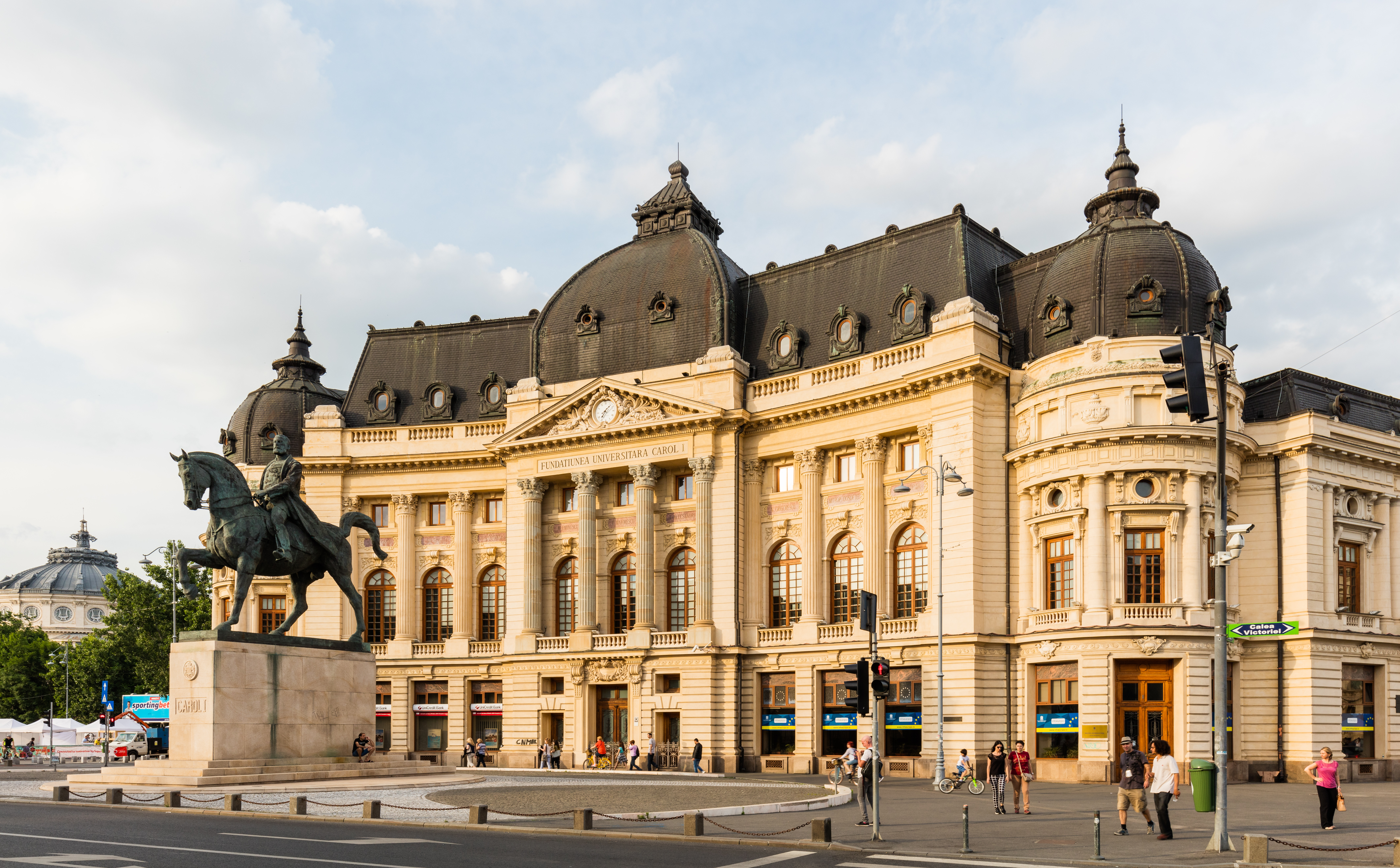
Central University Library on Calea Victoriei, Bucharest, 1891–1895, by Paul Gottereau

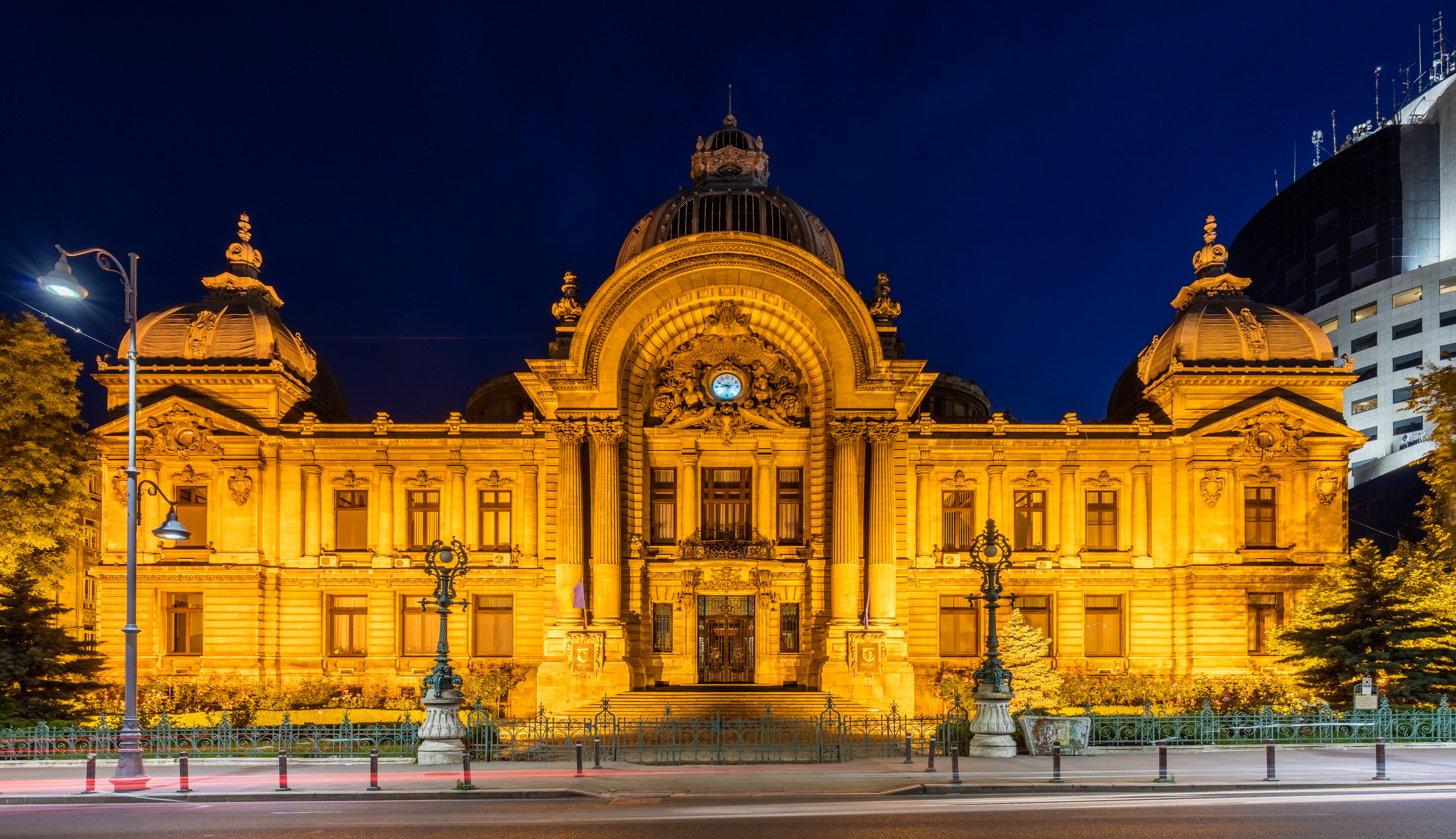
CEC Palace on Calea Victoriei, 1897–1900, by Paul Gottereau (project) and Ion Socolescu (construction)

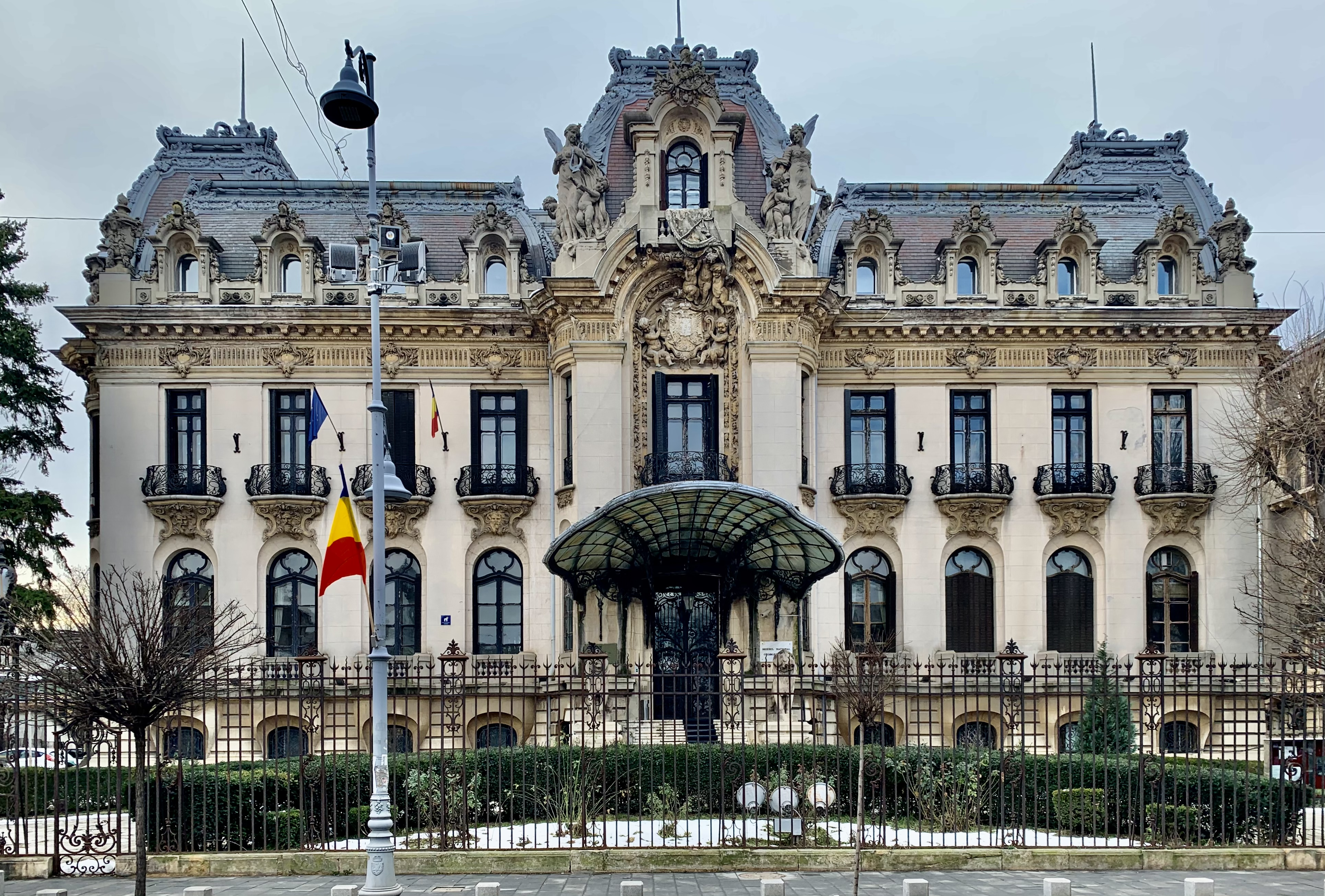
Cantacuzino Palace on Calea Victoriei, 1898–1906, by Ion D. Berindey

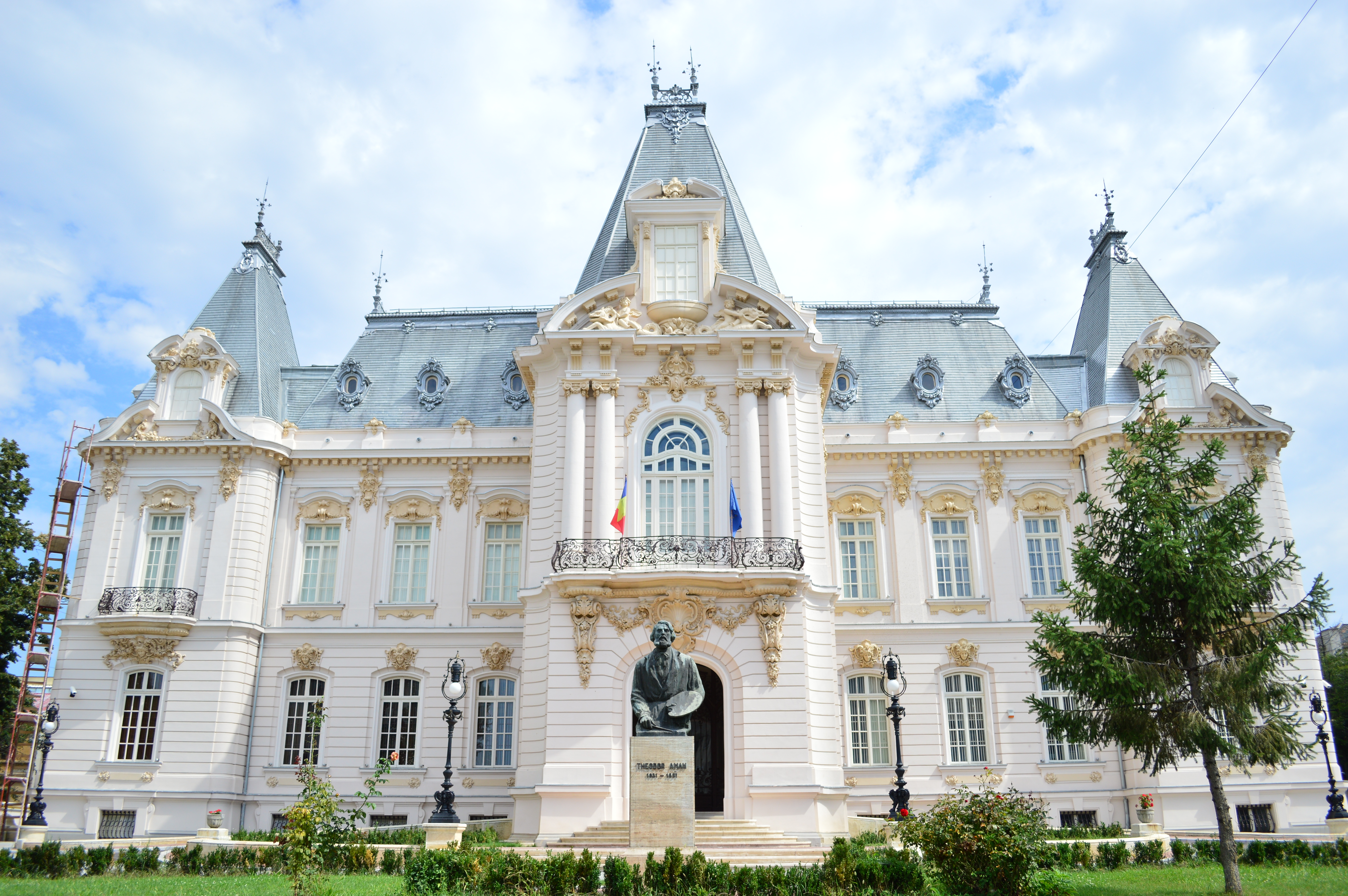
Constantin Mihail Palace (currently the Craiova Art Museum), Craiova, 1898–1907, by Paul Gottereau

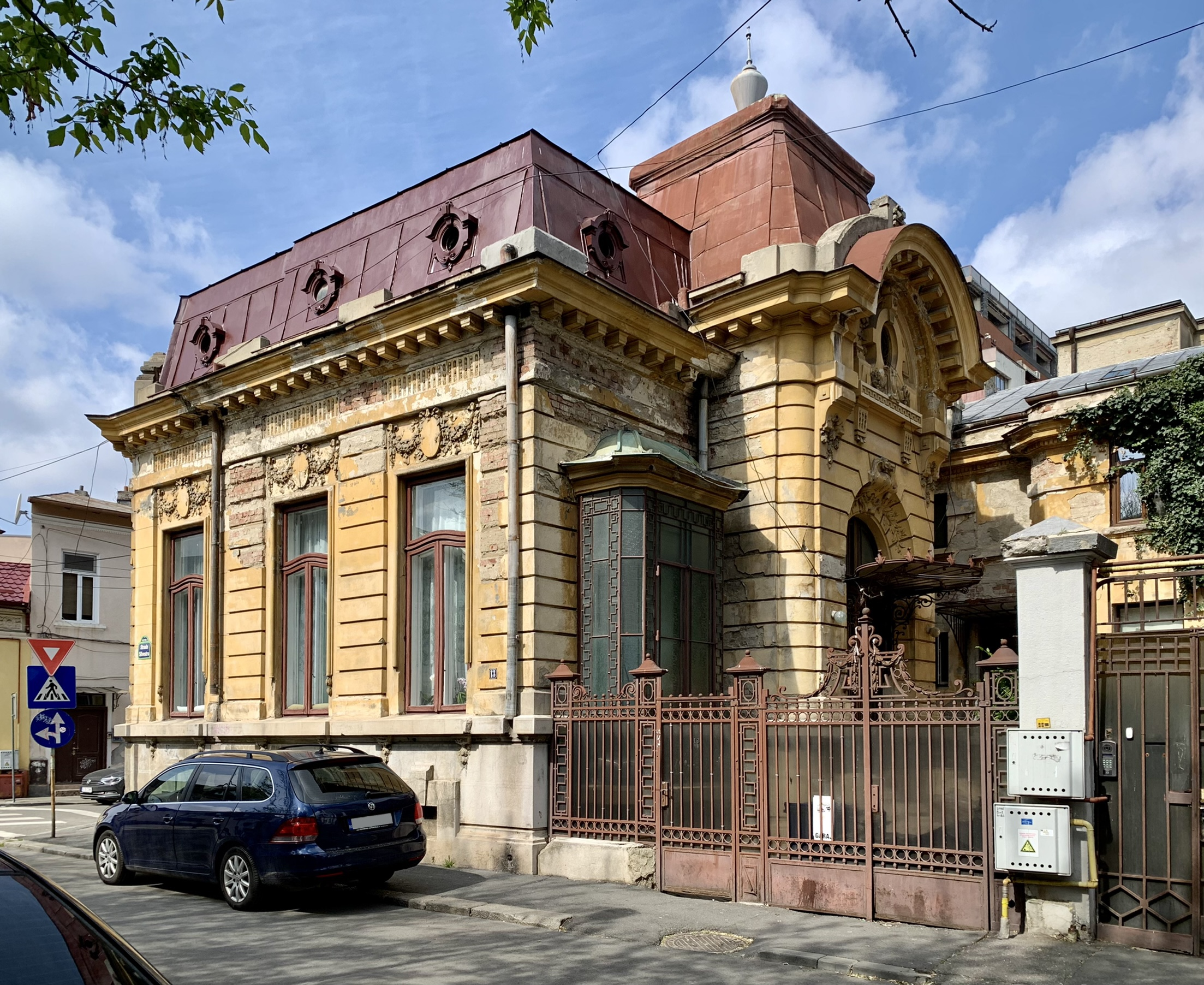
Strada Silvestru no. 13, Bucharest, c.1900, unknown architect

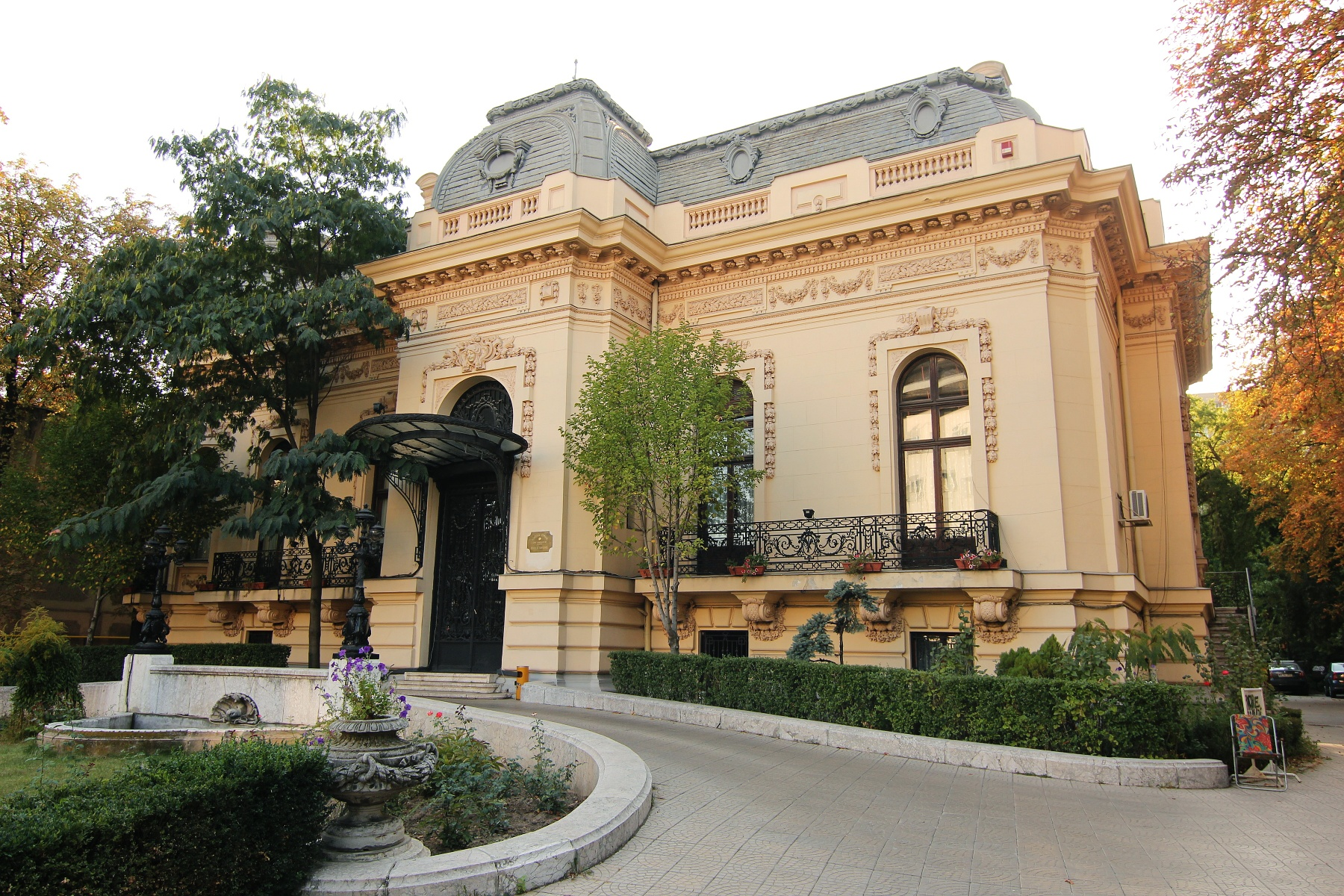
Assan House, Bucharest, 1914, by Ion D. Berindey

In the Romanian Old Kingdom, towards the end of the century, many administrative buildings and private homes are built in the «Beaux-Arts» or «Eclectic» style, brought from France through French architects who came here for work in Romania, schooled in France. The National Bank of Romania Palace on Strada Lipscani, built between 1883 and 1885 is a good example of this style, decorated not just with columns (mainly Ionic), but also with allegorical statues placed in niches, that depict Agriculture, Industry, Commerce, and Justice. Because of the popularity of this style, it changed the way Bucharest looks, making it similar in some way with Paris, which led to Bucharest being seen as "Little Paris". Eclecticism was very popular not just in Bucharest and Iași, the two biggest cities of Romania at that time, but also in smaller ones like Craiova, Caracal, Râmnicu Vâlcea, Pitești, Ploiești, Buzău, Botoșani, Piatra Neamț, etc. This style was used not only for administrative palaces and big houses of wealthy people, but also for middle-class homes.

==== Spain ====
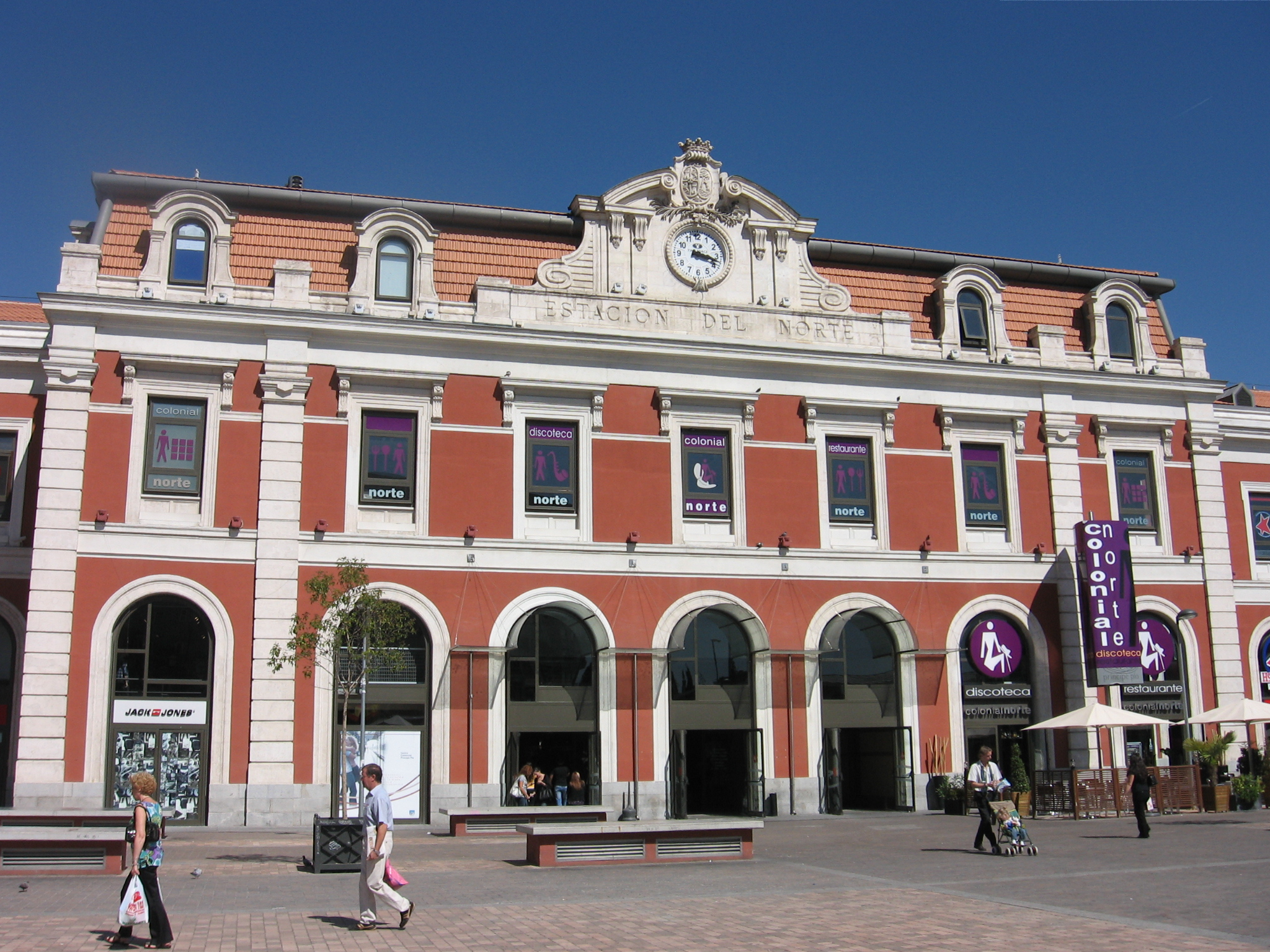
Estación del Norte, Madrid (renamed the Estación de Príncipe Pío after renovation in 1995)

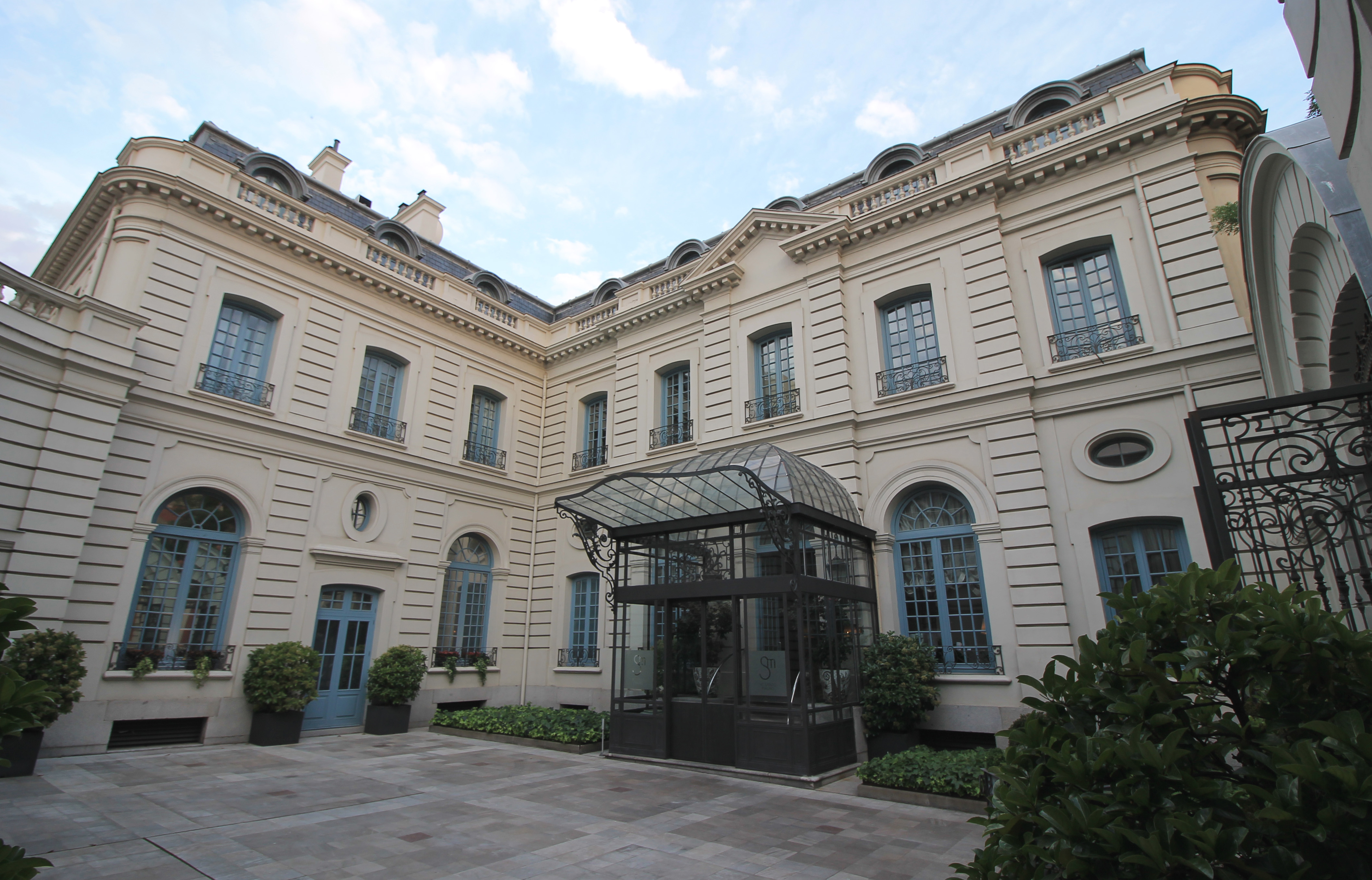
Hotel Santo Mauro, Madrid

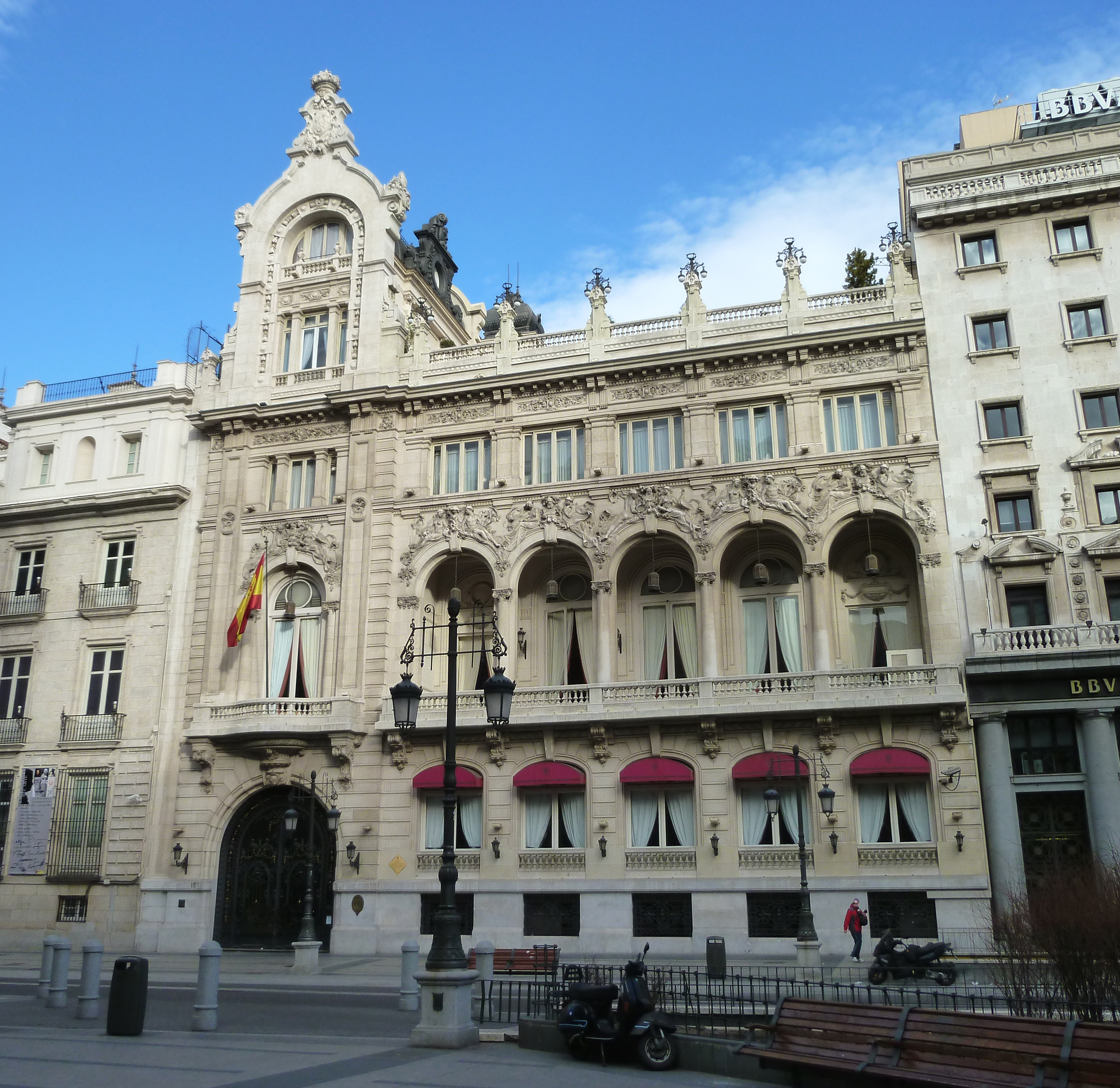
Casino de Madrid

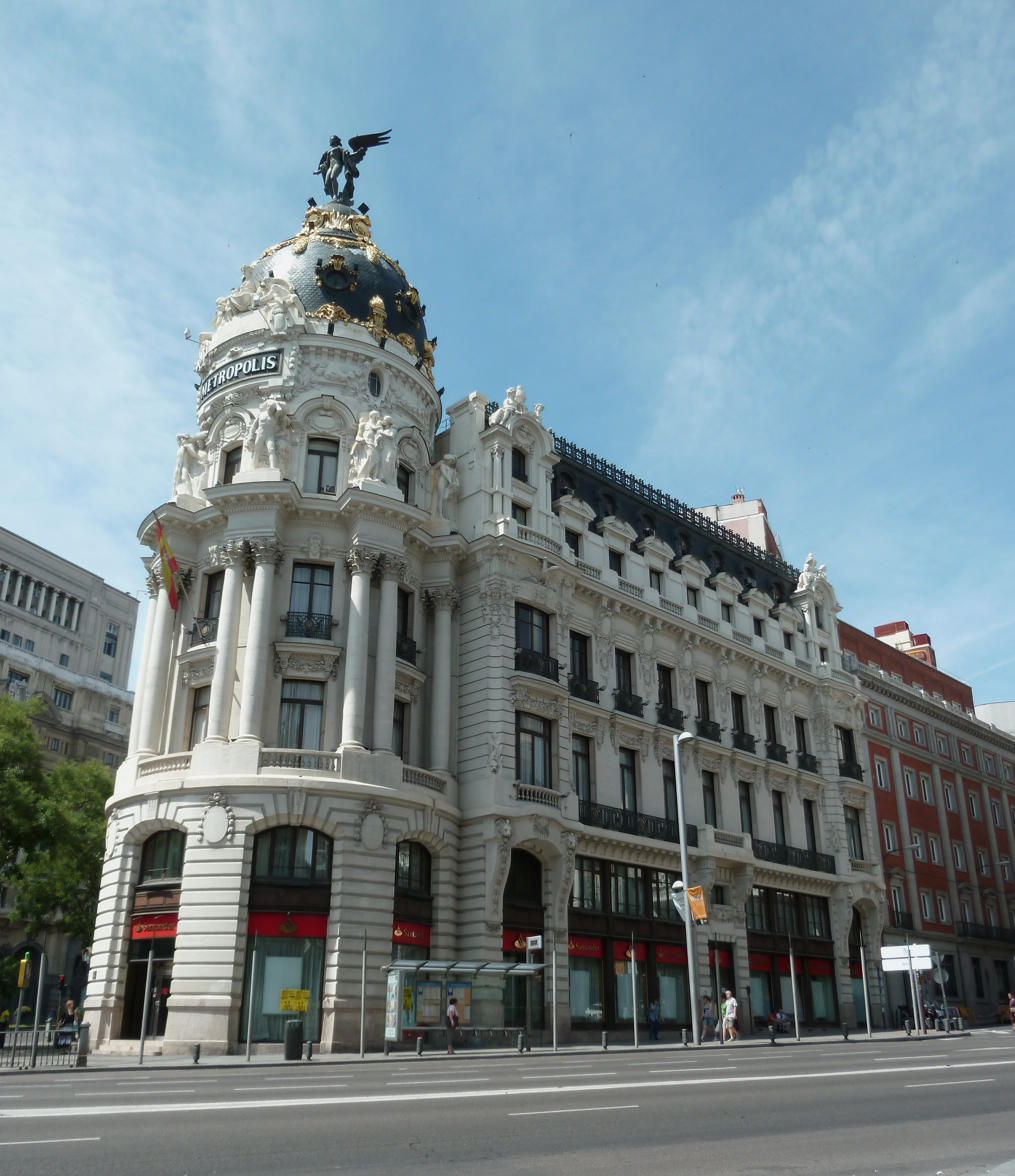
Edificio Metrópolis, Madrid

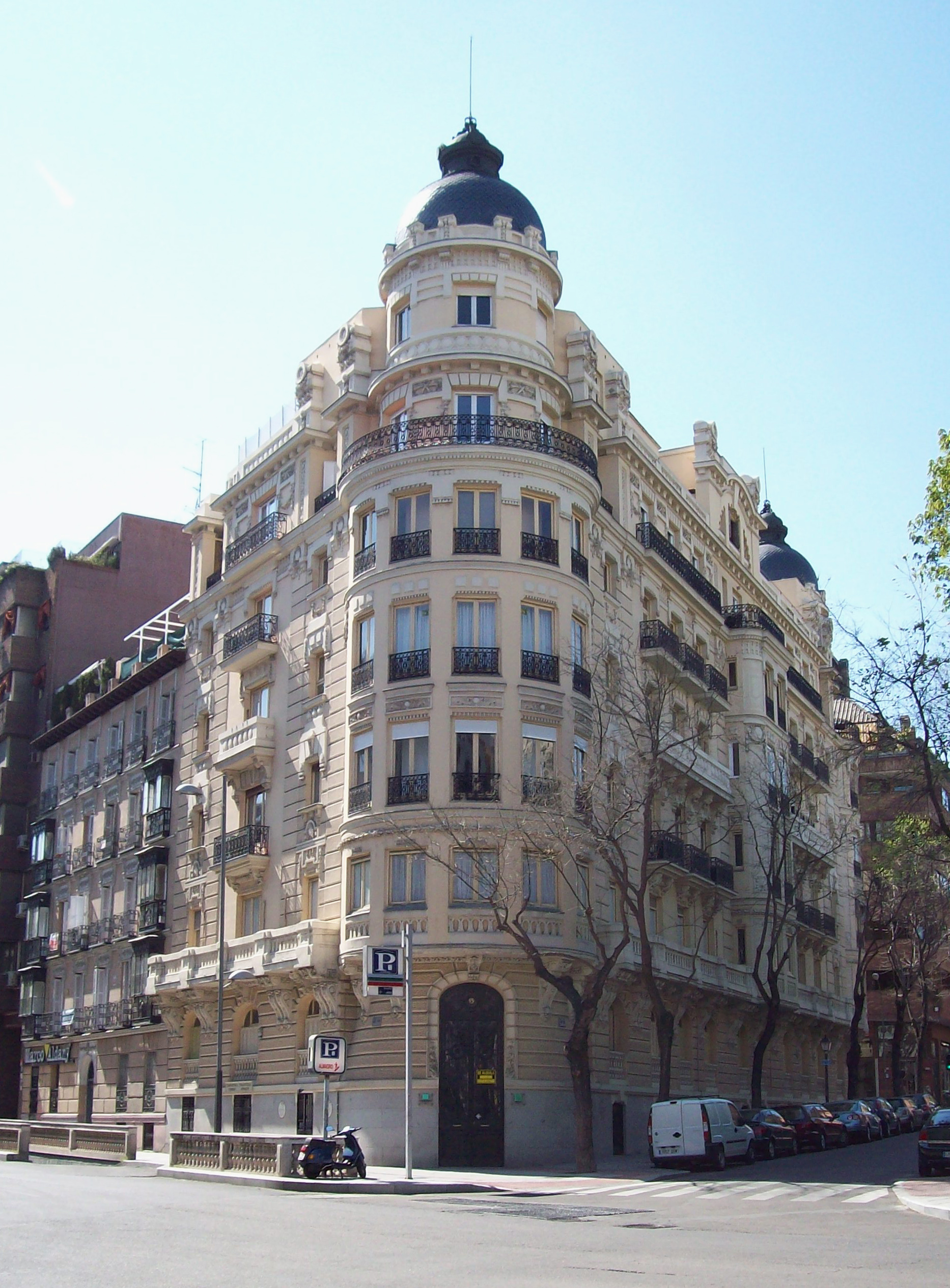
Casa Reynot, Madrid

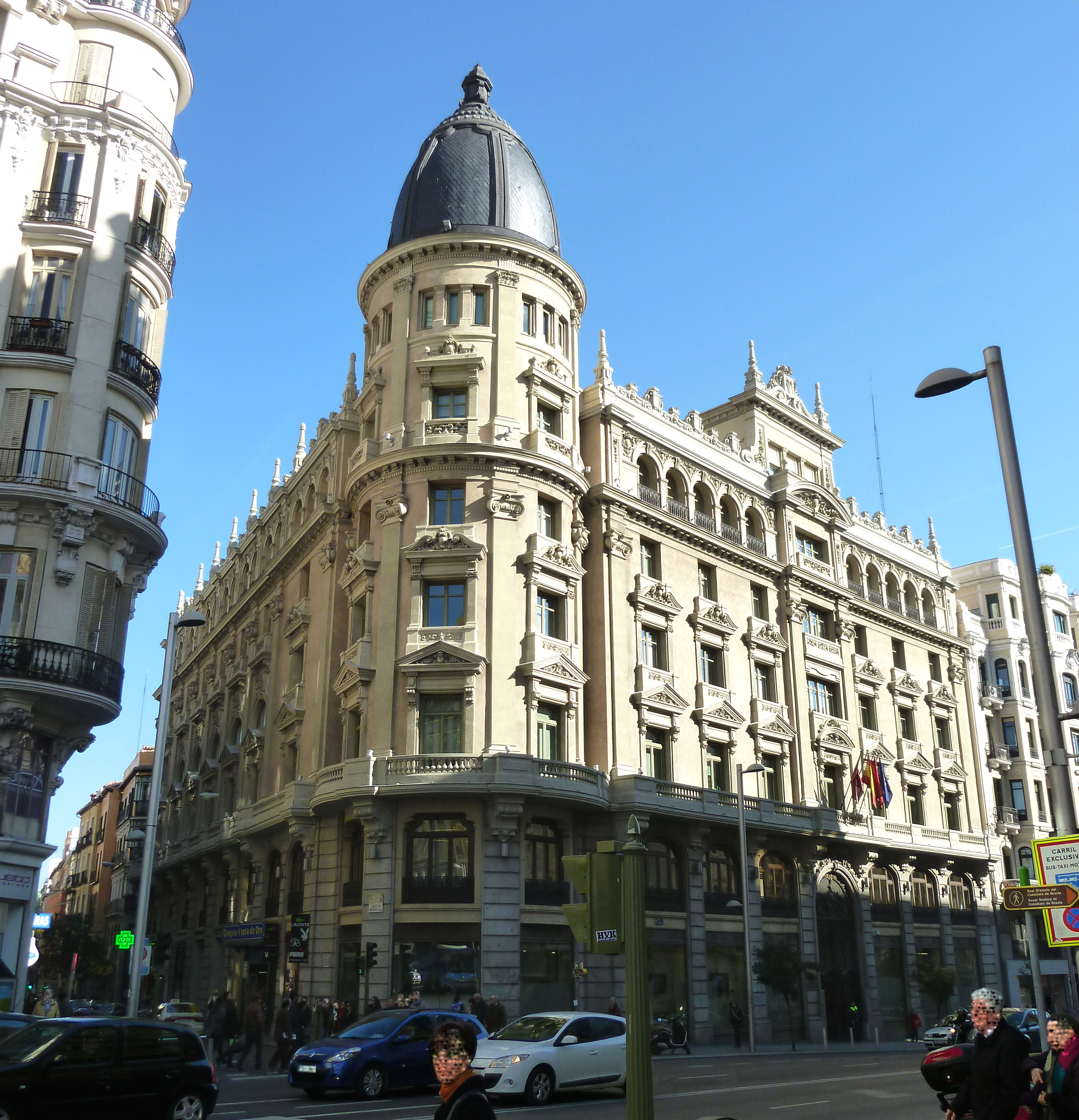
Gran Vía 24, Madrid

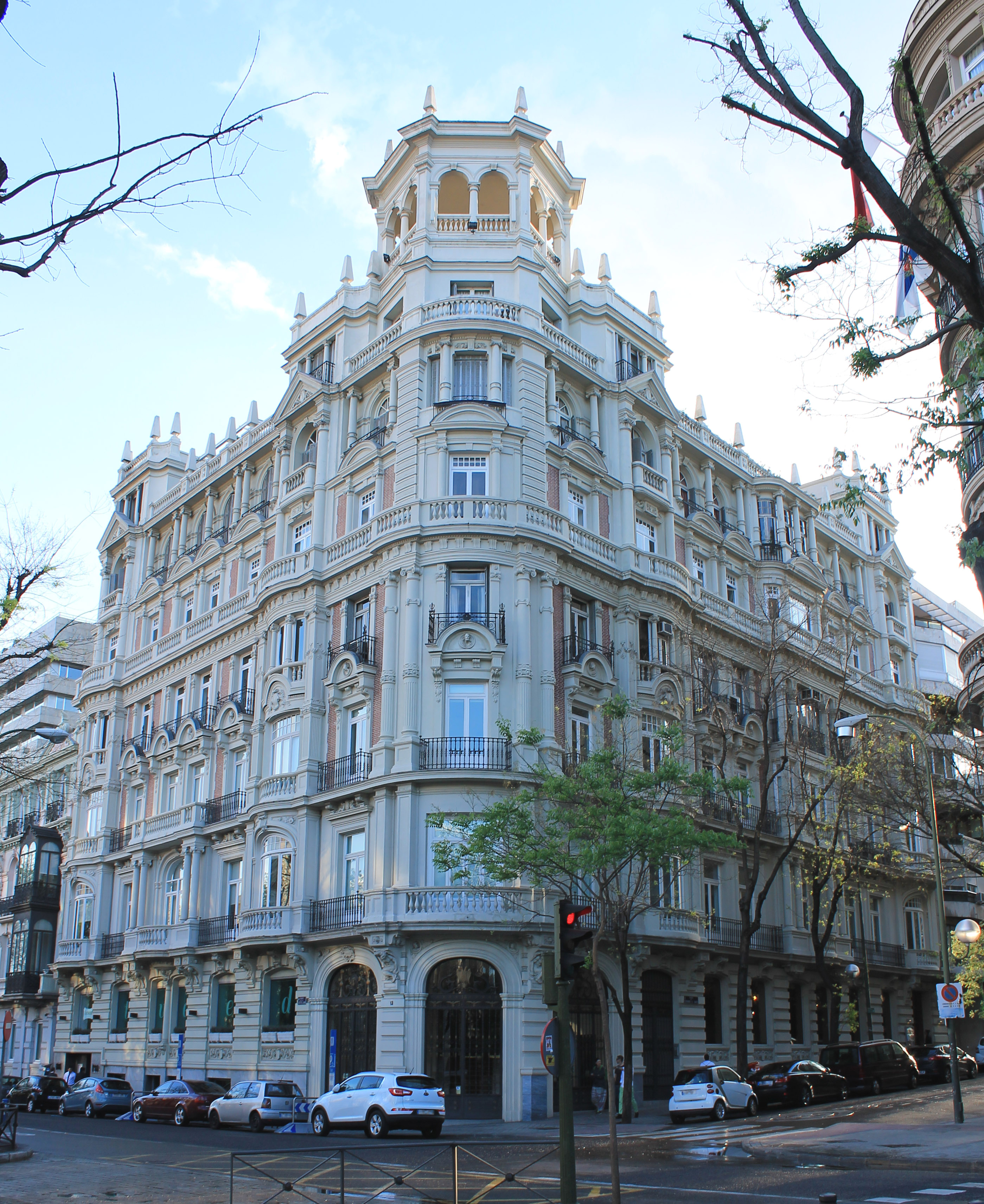
Homes for the Marquis of Encinares, Madrid

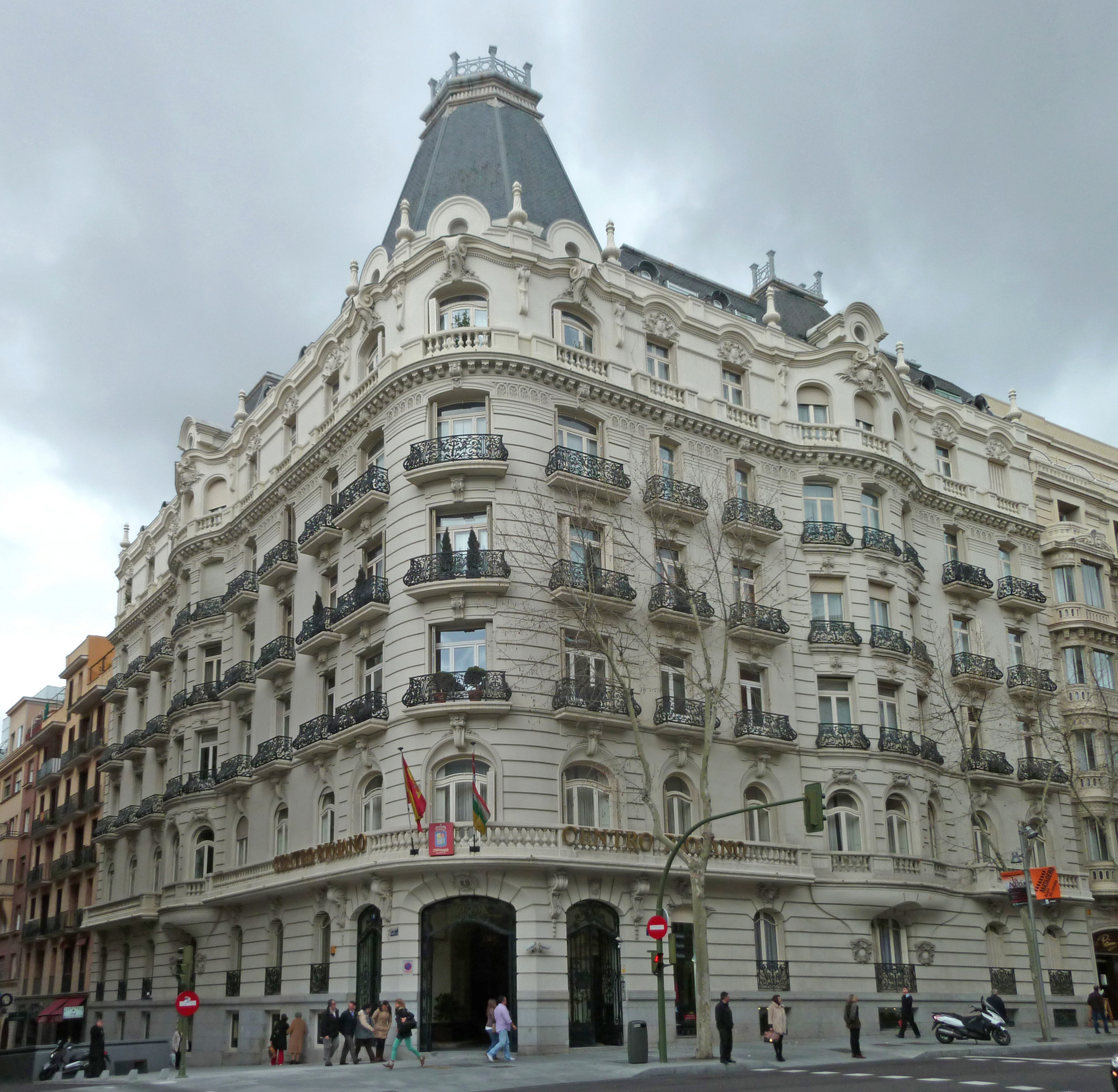
Casa-Palacio de Tomás de Beruete, Madrid

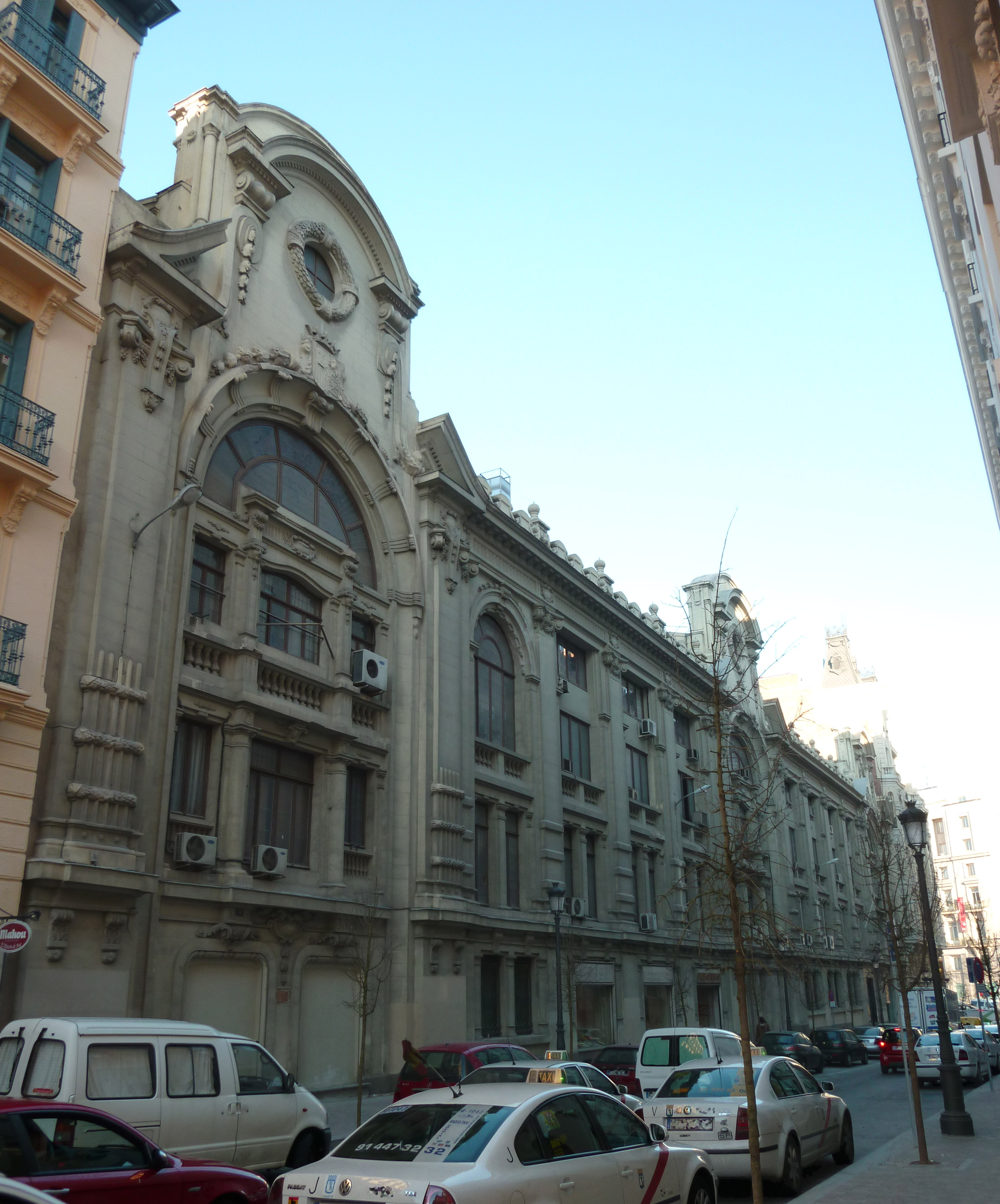
Former Humanities Center of the Spanish National Research Council, Madrid

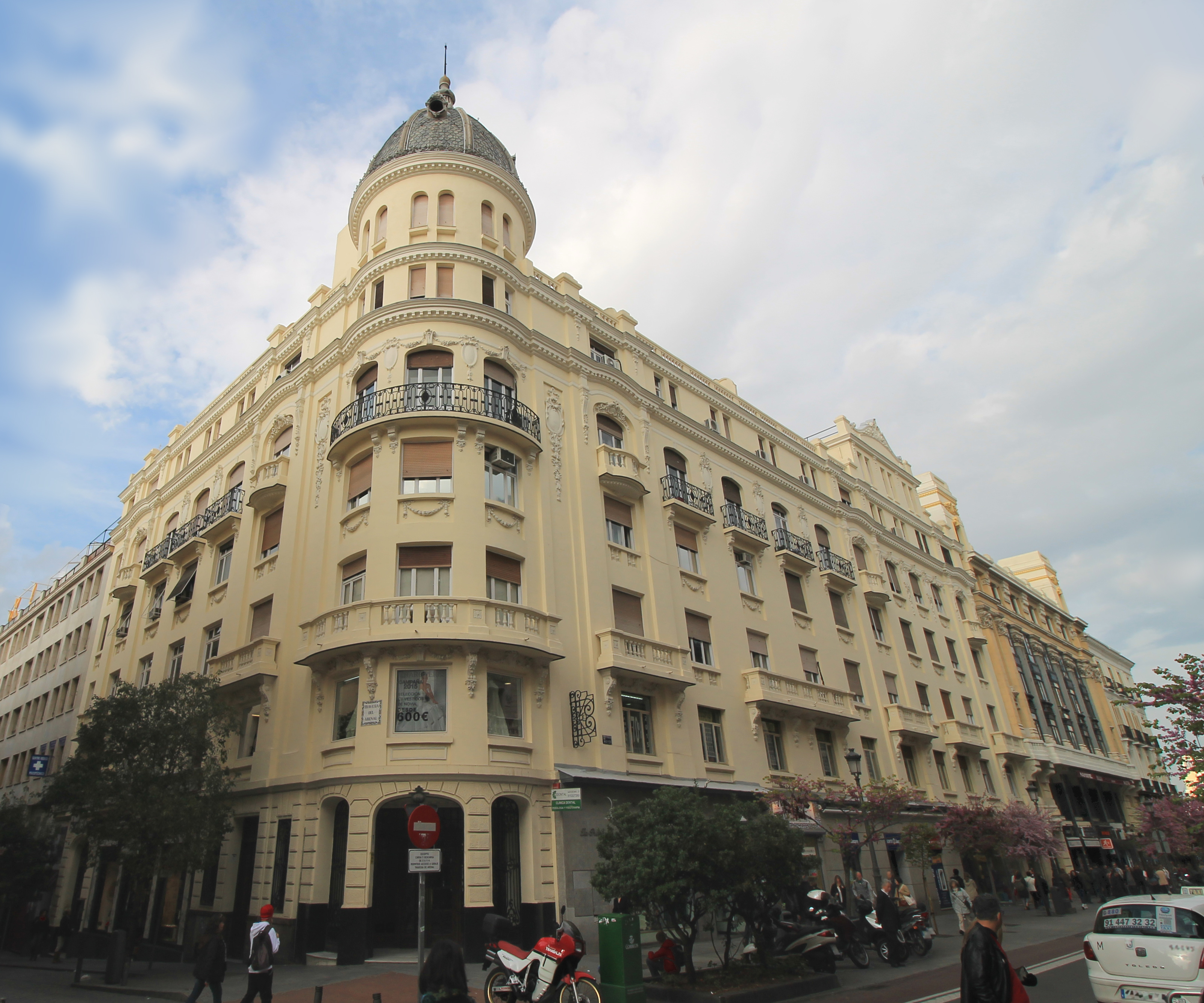
Calle Mayor 6, Madrid

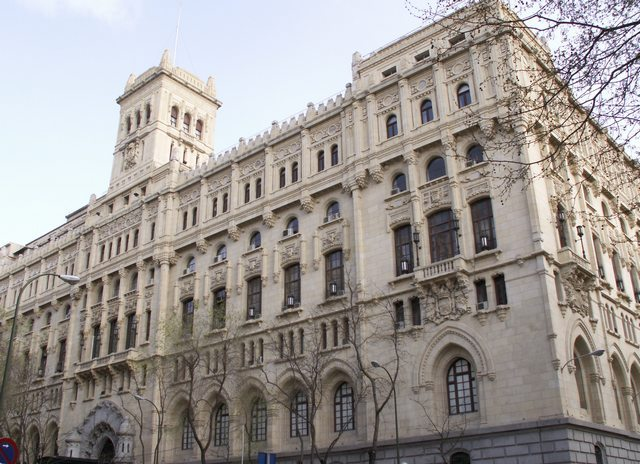
Spanish Navy Headquarters, Madrid

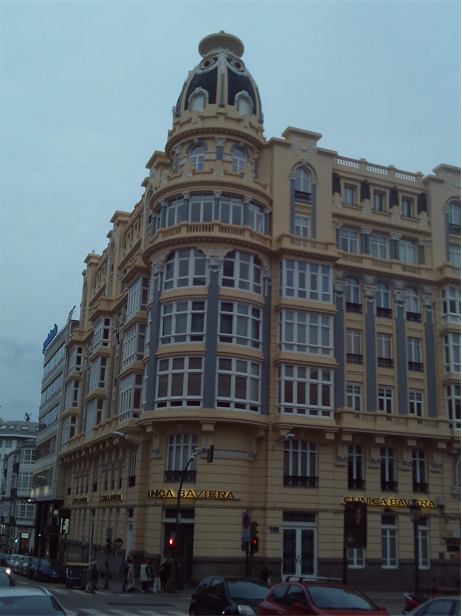
Casa Cortés, Corunna

===== Beaux-Arts buildings in Spain =====
- 1876: Royal Economic Society of Friends of the Country of Cartagena building, Cartagena
- 1876–1882: North Station, Madrid
- 1886: Gutierrez Passage, Valladolid
- 1891: Casa Resines, Valladolid
- 1902: Hotel Santo Mauro, Madrid
- 1905–1910: Casino de Madrid
- 1907–1911: Metropolis Building, Madrid
- 1908–1911: Calle de Montalbán 5, Madrid
- 1913–1916: Reynot House, Madrid
- 1915–1928: Navy Headquarters, Madrid
- 1919–1924: Gran Vía 24, Madrid
- 1920–1923: Homes for the Marquis of Encinares, Madrid
- 1921–1923: Mansion of Tomás de Beruete, Madrid
- 1922: Former Humanities Center of the Spanish National Research Council, Madrid
- 1924: Calle Mayor 6, Madrid

=== North America ===
==== Canada ====
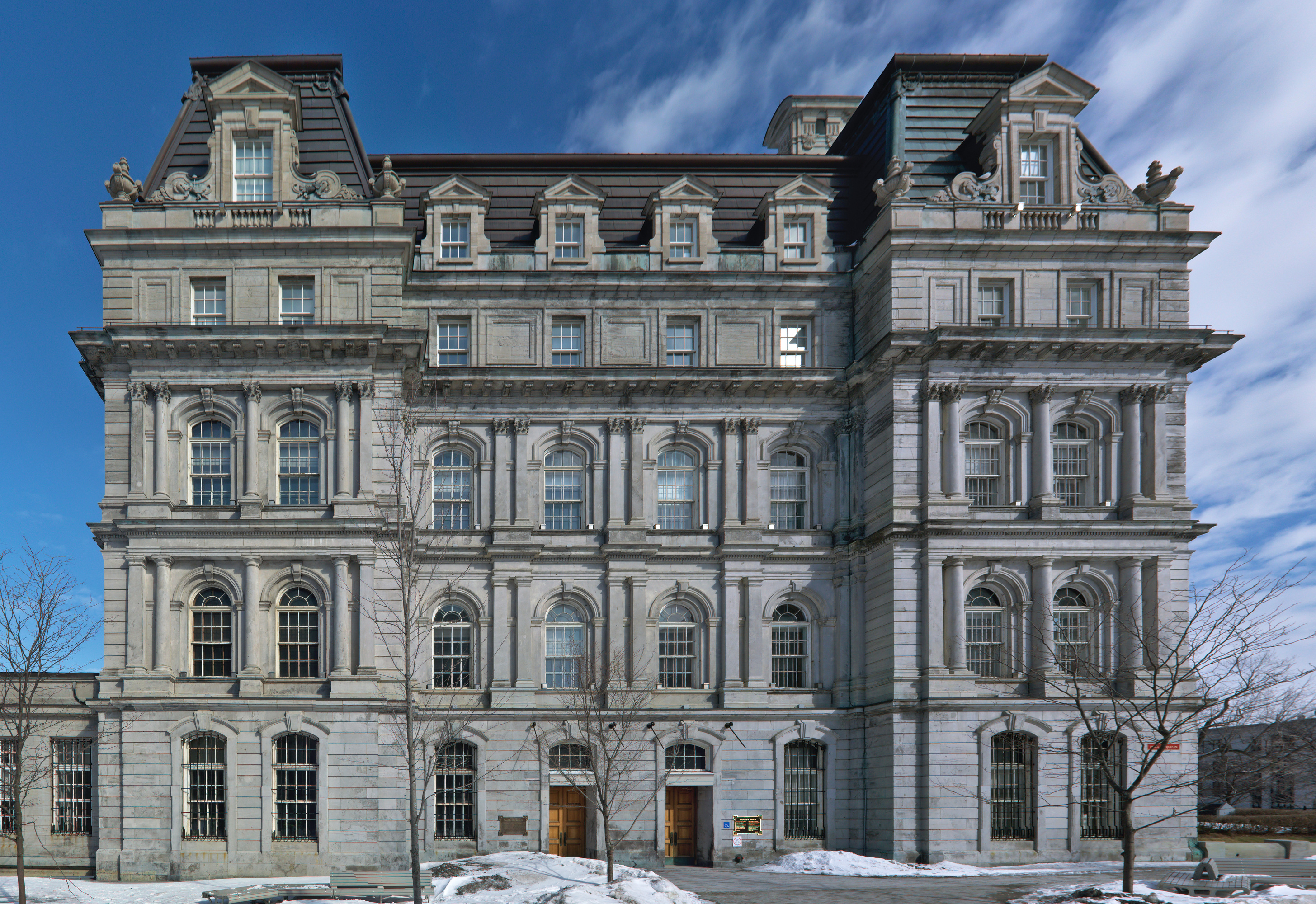
Montreal City Hall, Montreal

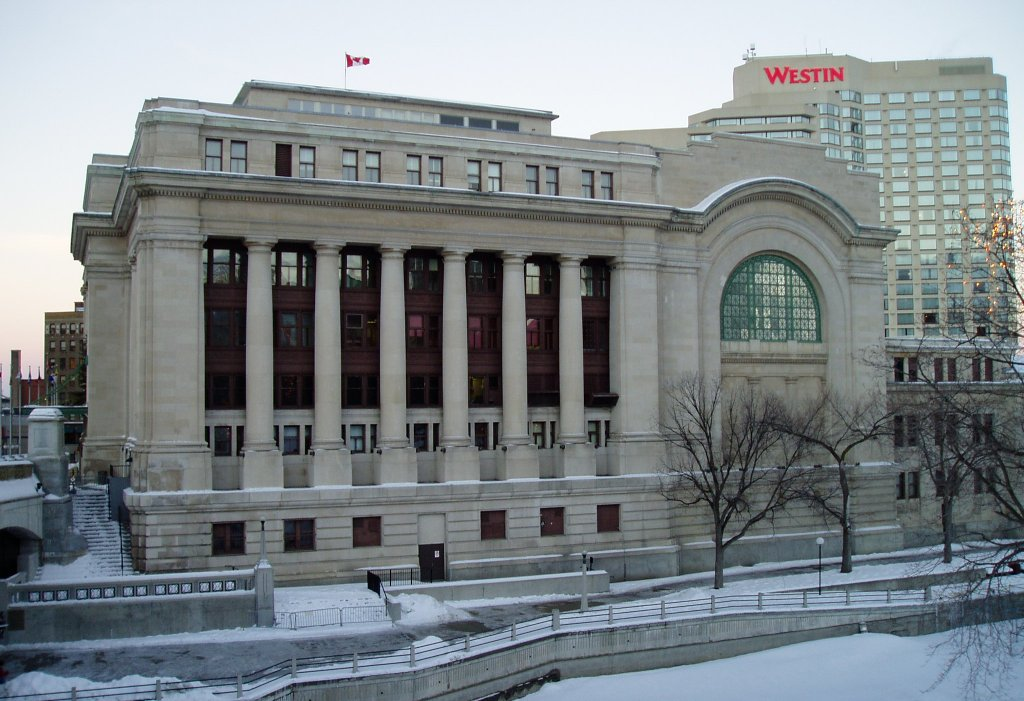
Senate of Canada Building, Ottawa

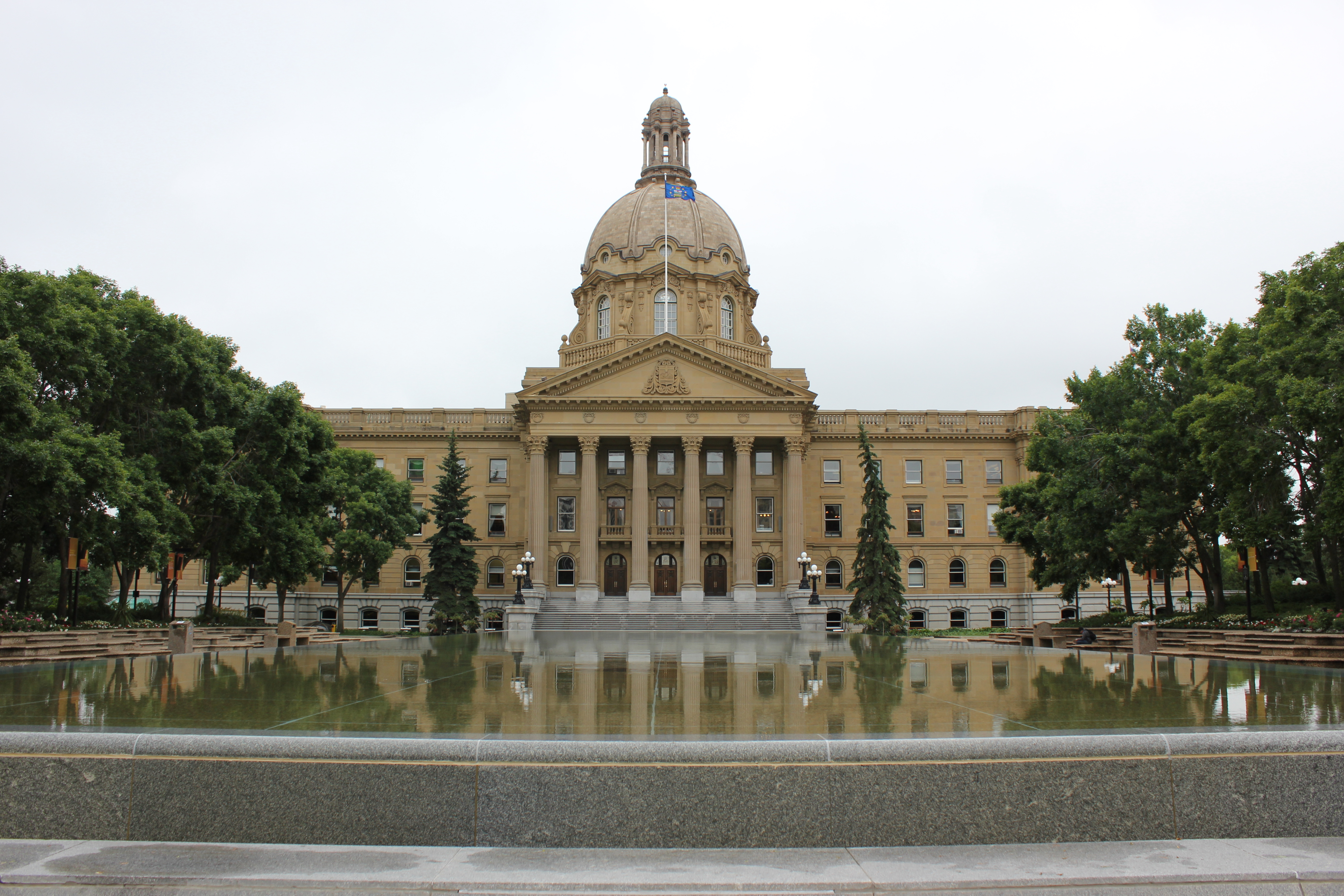
Alberta Legislature Building, Edmonton

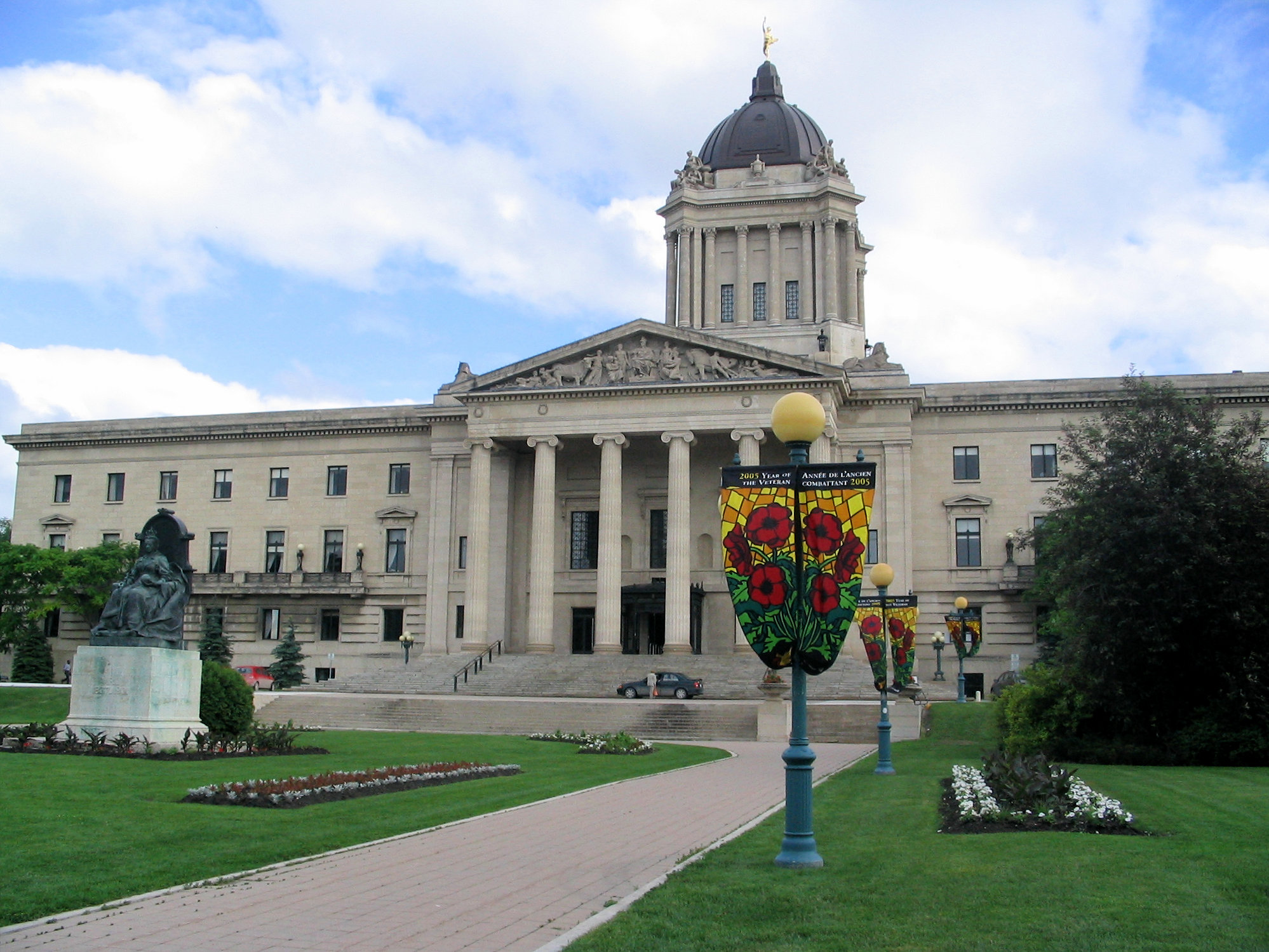
Manitoba Legislative Building, Winnipeg

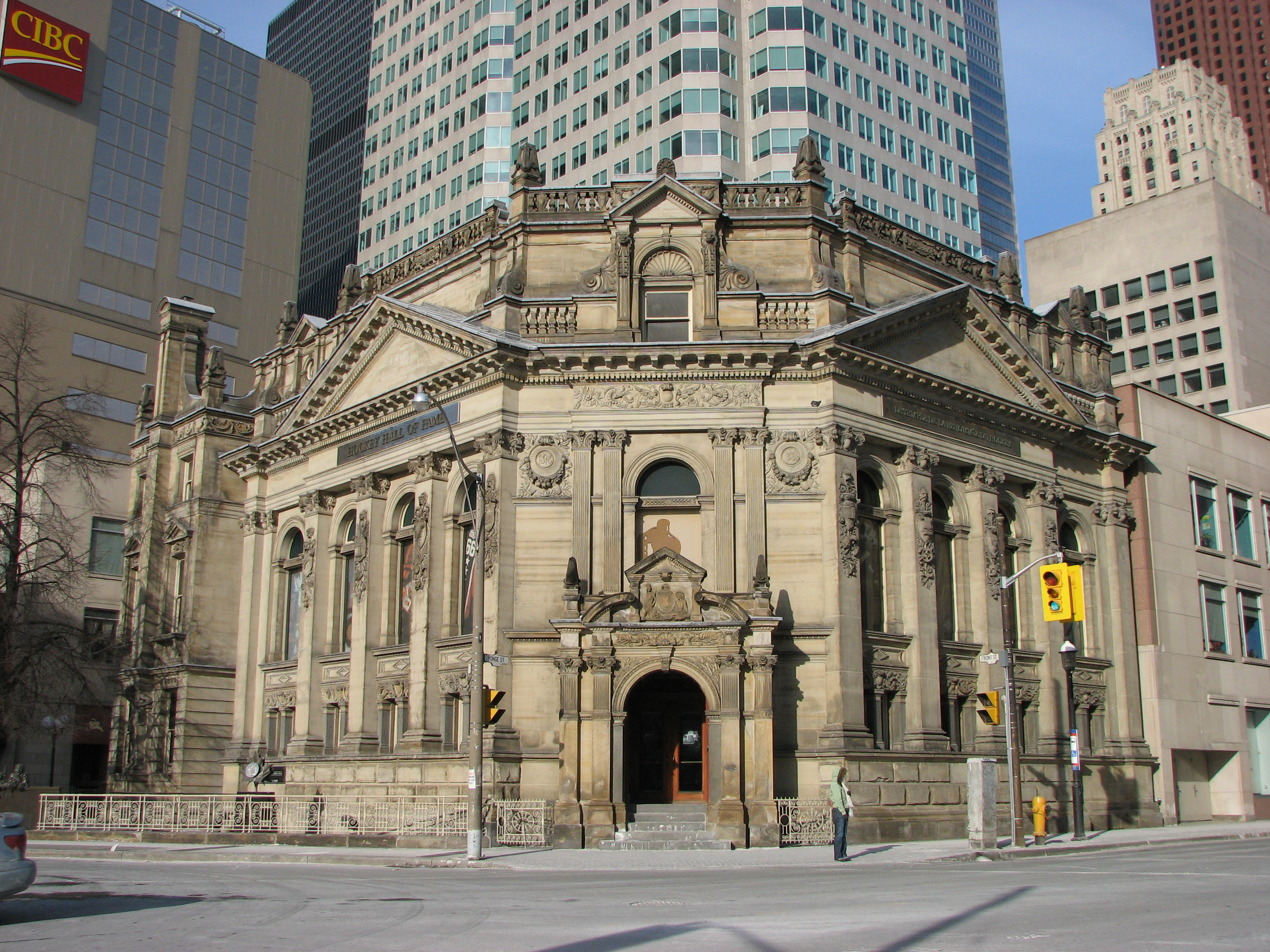
Hockey Hall of Fame, Toronto

Beaux-Arts was very prominent in public buildings in Canada in the early 20th century. Notably all three prairie provinces' legislative buildings are in this style.

===== Beaux-Arts buildings in Canada =====
- 1885: Hockey Hall of Fame (formerly a branch of the Bank of Montreal), Toronto
- 1898: London and Lancashire Life Building, Montreal
- 1903: Old Montreal Stock Exchange Building
- 1905: Alden Hall, Meadville
- 1906: Toronto Power Generating Station
- 1907: Royal Alexandra Theatre, Toronto
- 1909: Linton Apartments, Montreal
- 1910: Gilles Hocquart Building (originally the École des Hautes études commerciales), Montreal
- 1912: Sun Tower, Vancouver
- 1912: Montreal Museum of Fine Arts, Montreal
- 1912: Senate of Canada Building (originally a railway station by Ross and Macdonald), Ottawa
- 1912: Saskatchewan Legislative Building, Regina
- 1913: Alberta Legislative Building, Edmonton
- 1913–1920: Union Station, Toronto
- 1913–1931: Sun Life Building, Montreal
- 1920: Manitoba Legislative Building, Winnipeg
- 1920: Millennium Centre, Winnipeg
- 1923: Commemorative Arch, Royal Military College of Canada in Kingston, Ontario
- 1923–1924: Bank of Nova Scotia, Ottawa
- 1924–2017: Former Superior Court of Justice Building, Thunder Bay
- 1927: Union Station, Toronto
- 1930: Dominion Square Building, Montreal
- 1931: Canada Life Building, Toronto
- 1932: Mount Royal Chalet, Montreal
- 1932: Indigenous Peoples Space, Ottawa (formerly the United States Embassy)
- 1935: Dominion Public Building, Toronto

===== Beaux-Arts architects in Canada =====
- William Sutherland Maxwell
- John M. Lyle
- Ross and Macdonald
- Sproatt & Rolph
- Pearson and Darling
- Ernest Cormier
- E.J. Lennox
- Jean-Omer Marchand

==== Mexico ====
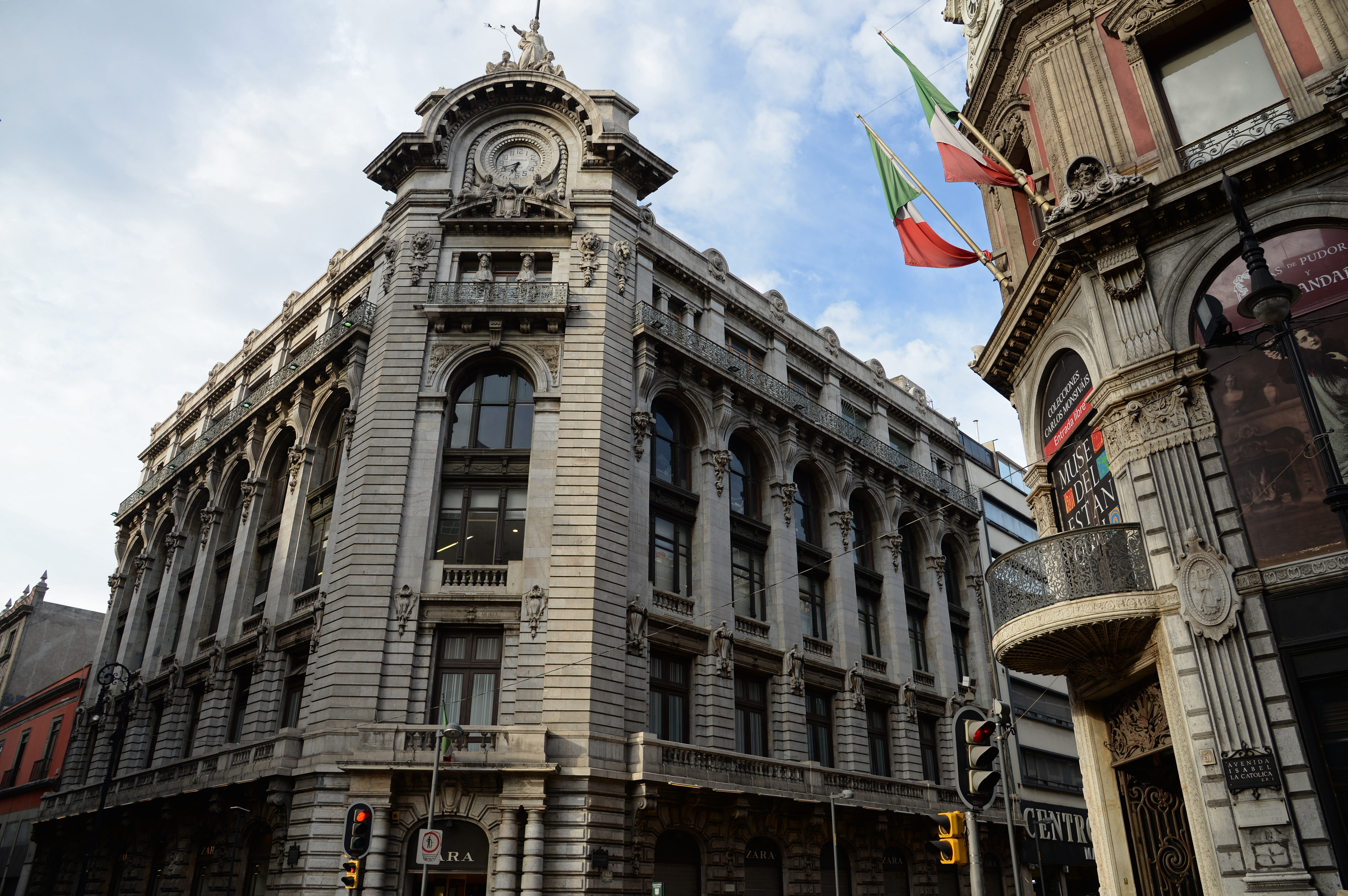
La Mexicana Building,
Mexico City (1907)

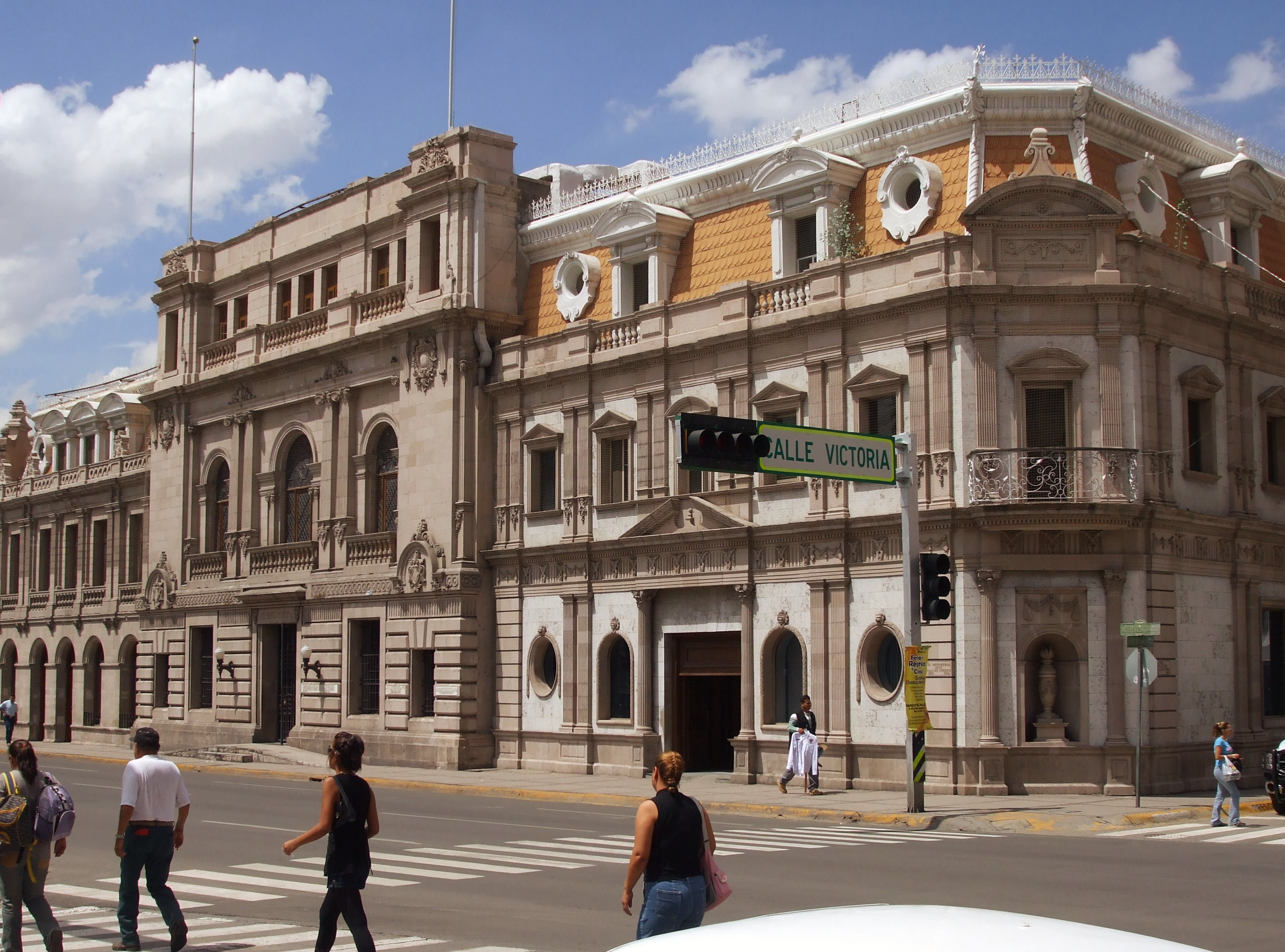
City Hall of Chihuahua,
Chihuahua City (1907)

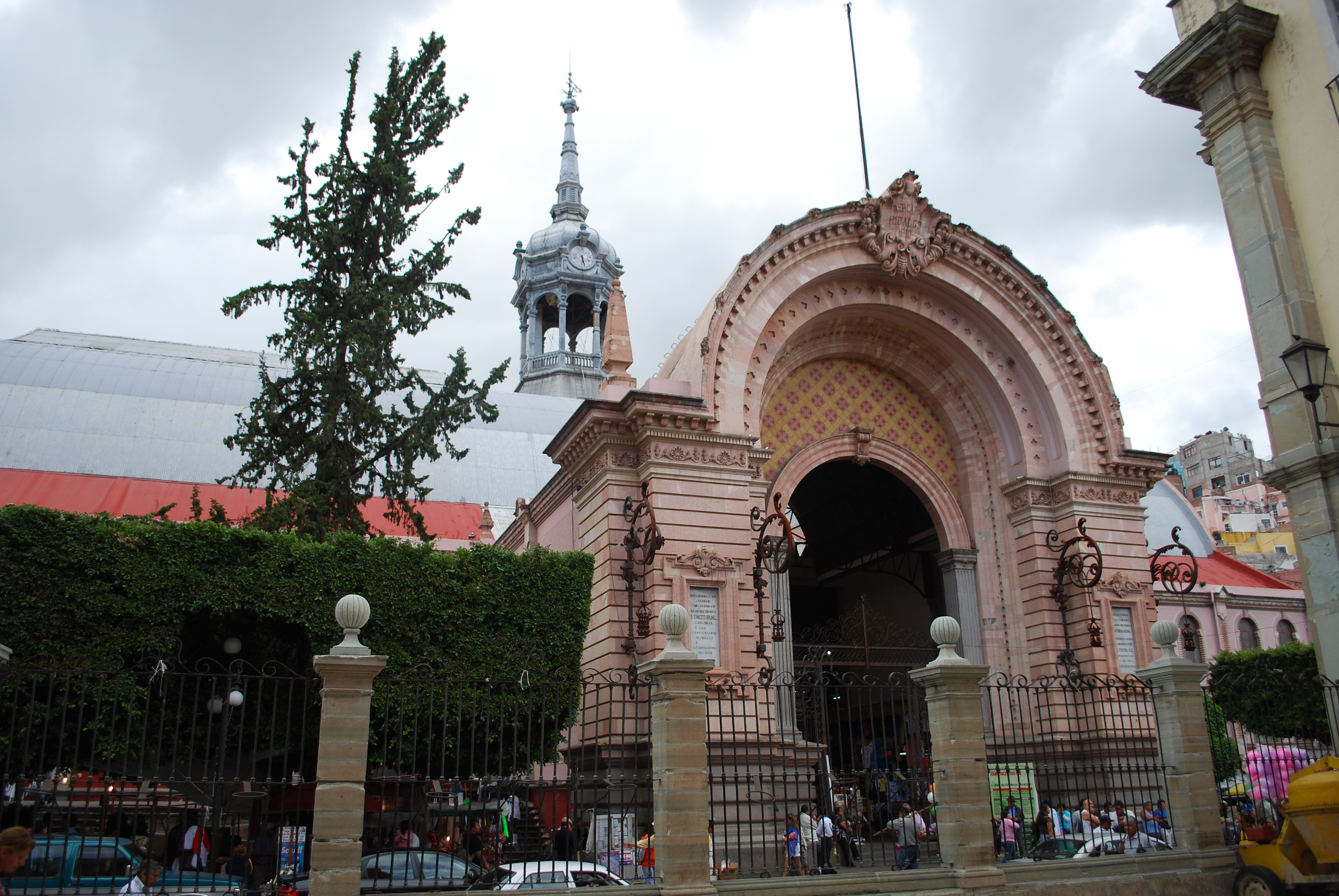
Hidalgo Market,
Guanajuato City (1910)

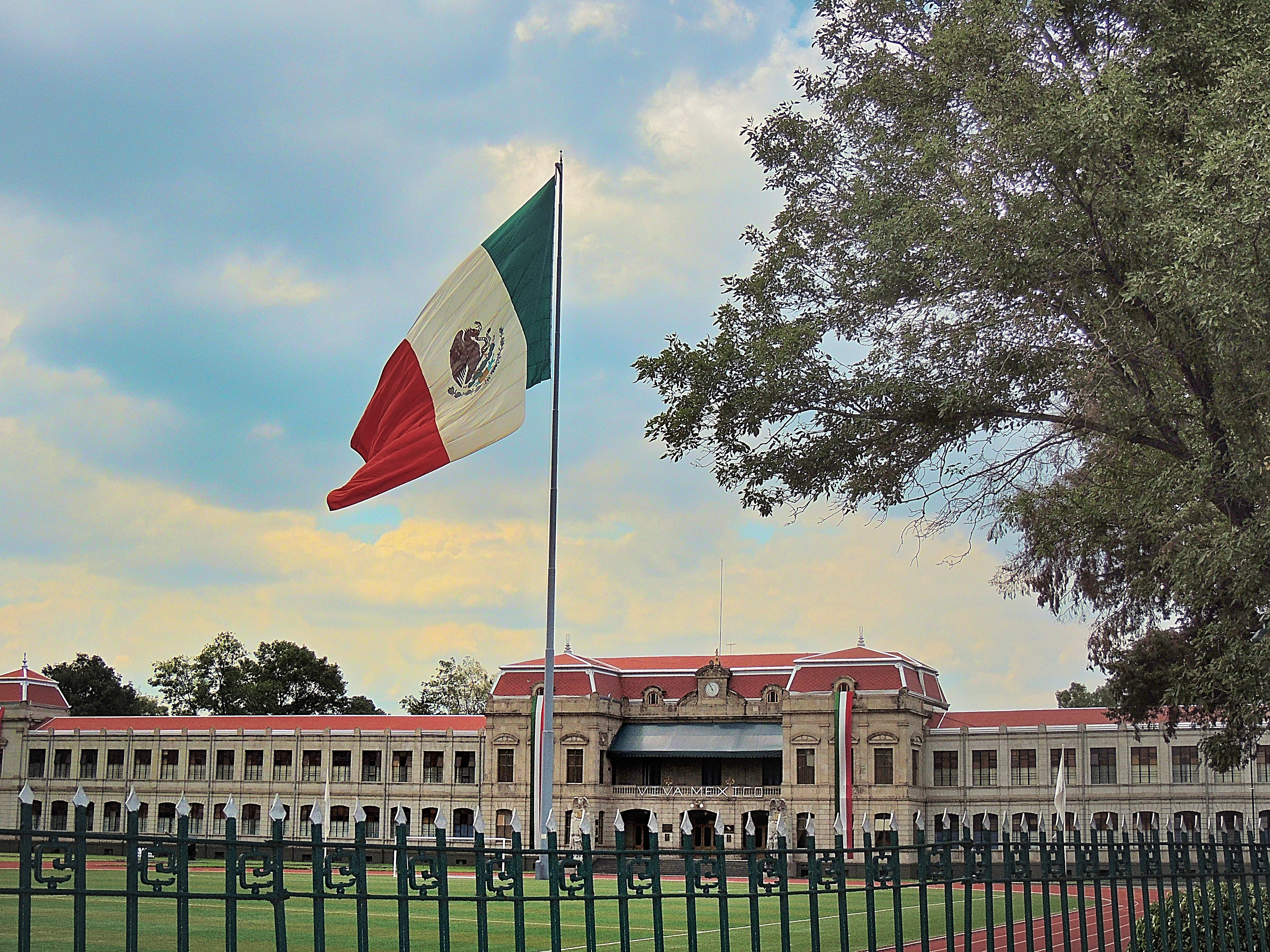
Former Military Academy,
Mexico City (1910)

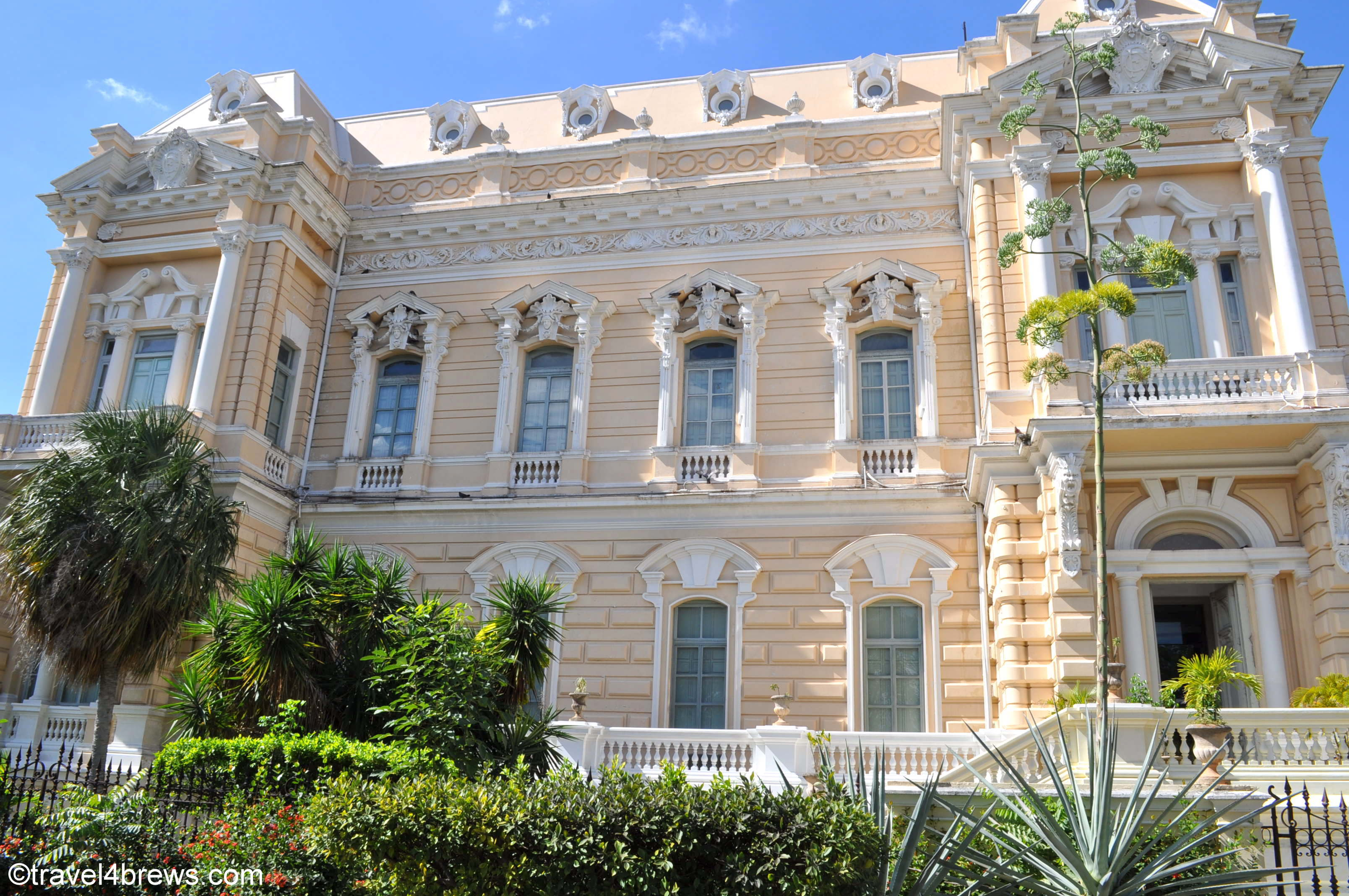
Cantón Palace,
Mérida (1911)

Beaux-Arts was architecturally relevant in Mexico in the late 19th century and the first decade of 20th century. The style was popular among the científicos of the Porfiriato. The Academy of San Carlos had an impact on the style's development in Mexico. Notable architects include Genaro Alcorta, Alfred Giles, and Antonio Rivas Mercado (the preeminent Mexican architect during this era). Rivas Mercado served as the director of the Academy of San Carlos from 1903 to 1912. Having studied at the École des Beaux-Arts in Paris, he aimed to incorporate and adapt its teachings to the Mexican context. Among the texts produced on the Beaux-Artes style, Eléments et théorie de l'architecture from Julien Guadet is said to have had the most influence in Mexico. The style lost popularity following the Mexican Revolution (beginning in 1910). In contemporary architecture, the style has influenced New Classical architect Jorge Loyzaga.

==== United States ====
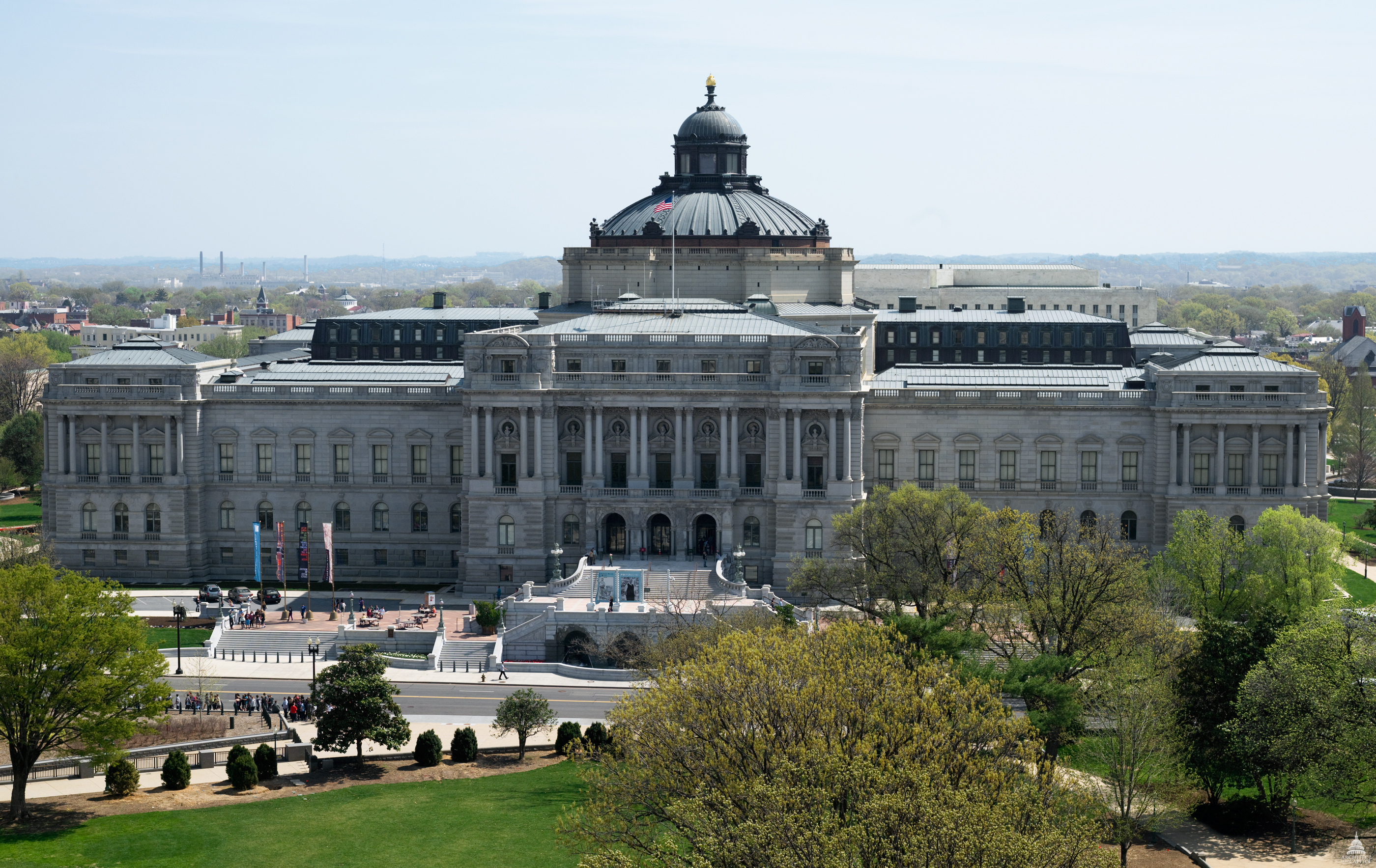
The Thomas Jefferson Building of the Library of Congress, Washington, D.C., by John L. Smithmeyer, Paul J. Pelz, and Edward Pearce Casey (1897)

The Willard Hotel, Washington, D.C., by Henry Janeway Hardenbergh (1901)

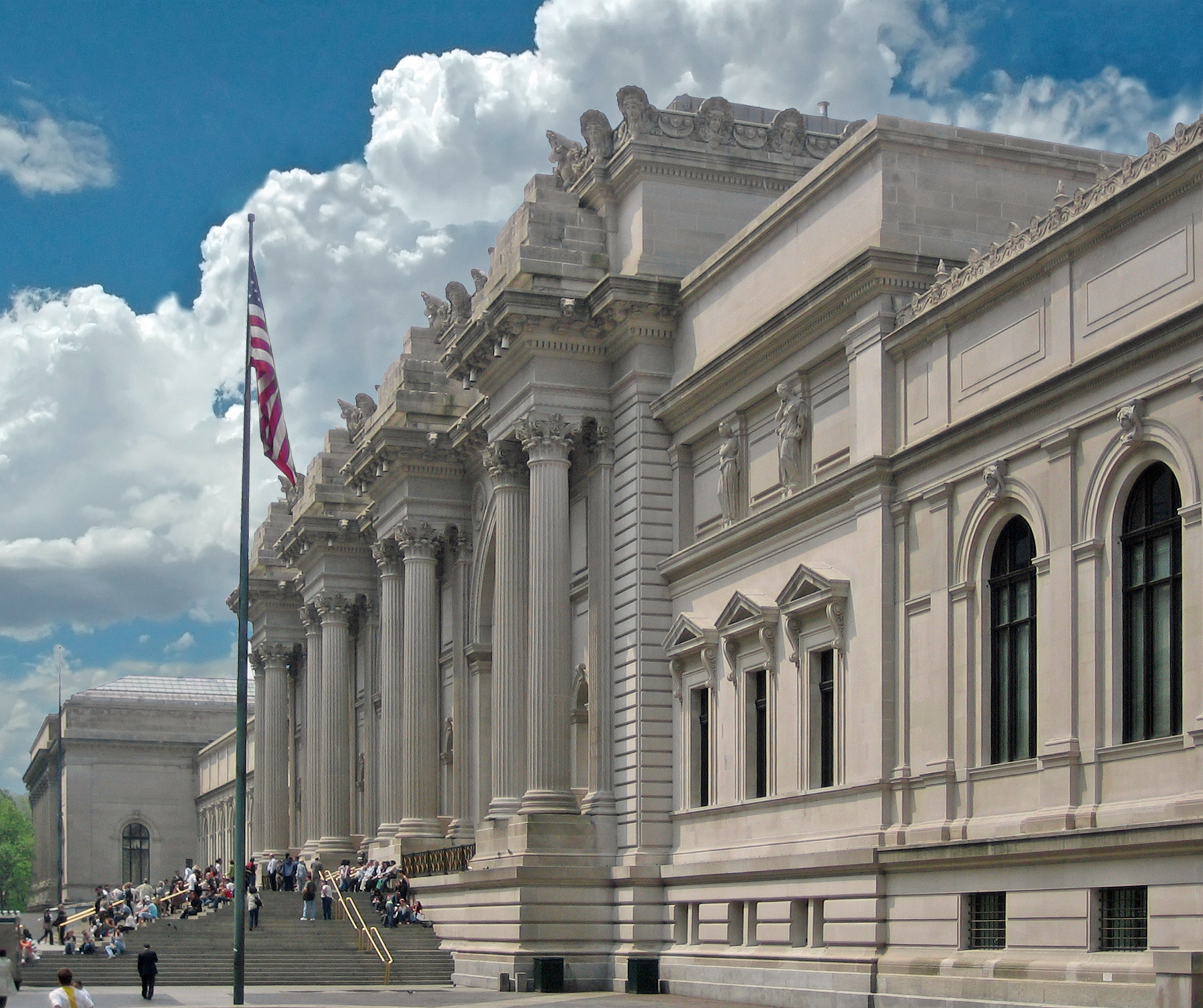
Facade of the Metropolitan Museum of Art, New York City, by Richard Morris Hunt (1902)

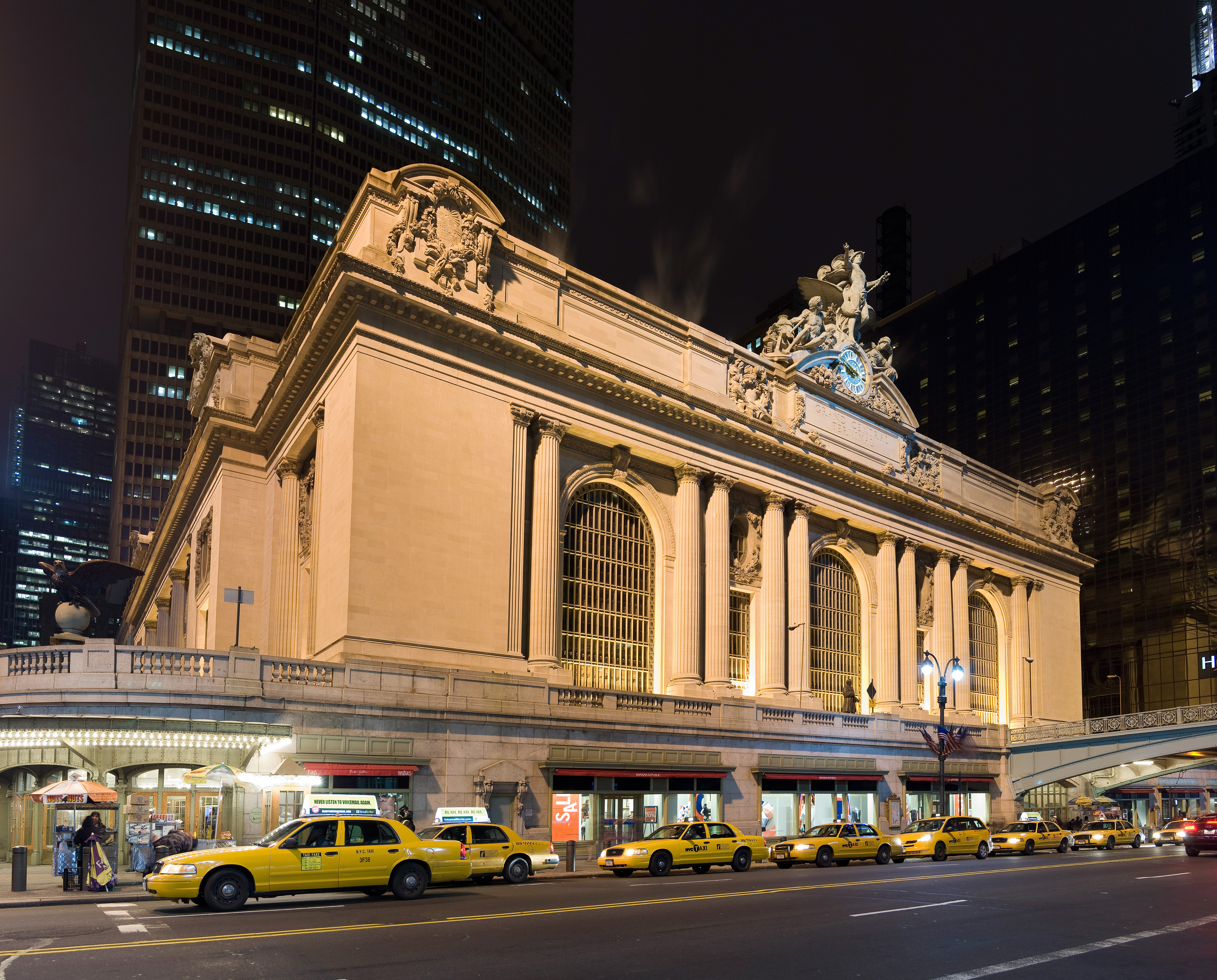
Grand Central Terminal (1913), New York City

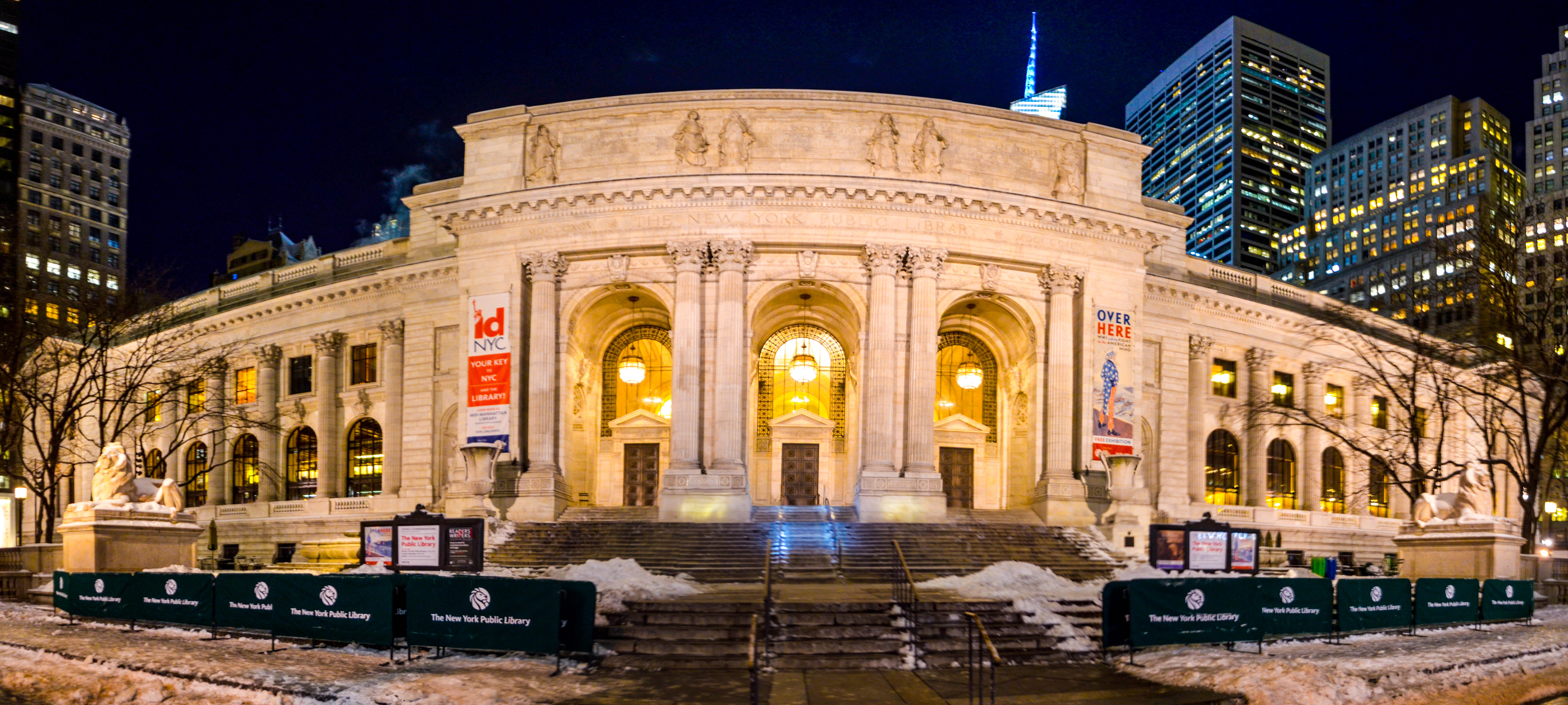
The New York Public Library Main Branch in Bryant Park, New York City, by architects Carrère and Hastings (1911)

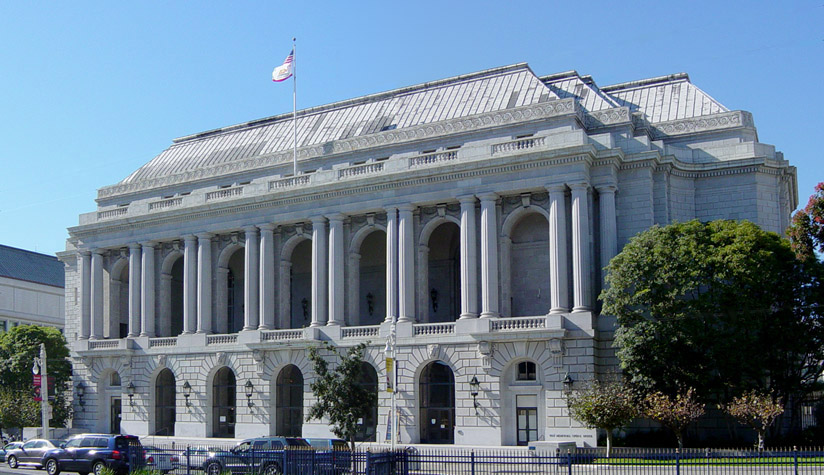
The San Francisco War Memorial Opera House by Arthur Brown Jr. (1932)

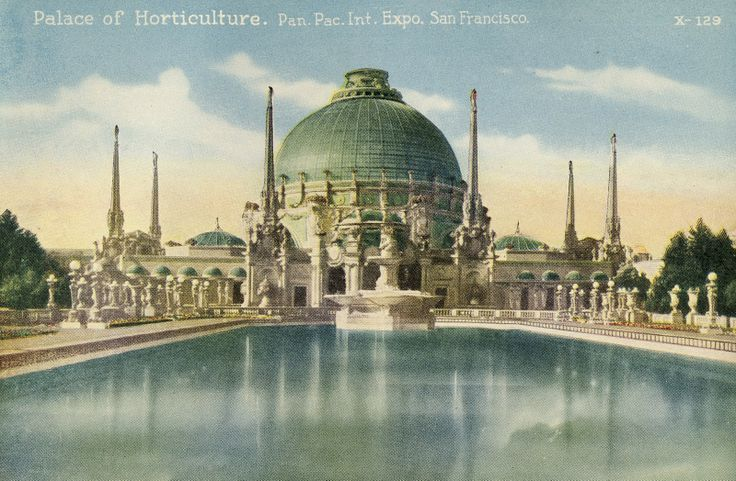
The Palace of Horticulture from the Panama–Pacific International Exposition in San Francisco by Arthur Brown Jr. (1915 demolished in 1916)

Beaux-Arts architecture had a strong influence on architecture in the United States because of the many prominent American architects who studied at the École des Beaux-Arts, including Henry Hobson Richardson, John Galen Howard, Daniel Burnham, and Louis Sullivan.

The first American architect to attend the École des Beaux-Arts was Richard Morris Hunt, between 1846 and 1855, followed by Henry Hobson Richardson in 1860. They were followed by an entire generation. Richardson absorbed Beaux-Arts lessons in massing and spatial planning, then applied them to Romanesque architectural models that were not characteristic of the Beaux-Arts repertory. His Beaux-Arts training taught him to transcend slavish copying and recreate in the essential fully digested and idiomatic manner of his models. Richardson evolved a highly personal style (Richardsonian Romanesque) freed of historicism that was influential in early Modernism.

The "White City" of the World's Columbian Exposition of 1893 in Chicago was a triumph of the movement and a major impetus for the short-lived City Beautiful movement in the United States. Beaux-Arts city planning, with its Baroque insistence on vistas punctuated by symmetry, eye-catching monuments, axial avenues, uniform cornice heights, a harmonious "ensemble", and a somewhat theatrical nobility and accessible charm, embraced ideals that the ensuing Modernist movement decried or just dismissed. The first American university to institute a Beaux-Arts curriculum is the Massachusetts Institute of Technology (MIT) in 1893, when the French architect Constant-Désiré Despradelle was brought to MIT to teach. The Beaux-Arts curriculum was subsequently begun at Columbia University, the University of Pennsylvania, and elsewhere. From 1916, the Beaux-Arts Institute of Design in New York City schooled architects, painters, and sculptors to work as active collaborators.

===== Beaux-Arts buildings in the United States =====
Numerous American university campuses were designed in the Beaux-Arts, notably: Columbia University (commissioned in 1896), designed by McKim, Mead & White; the University of California, Berkeley (commissioned in 1898), designed by John Galen Howard; the United States Naval Academy (built 1901–1908), designed by Ernest Flagg; the campus of MIT (commissioned in 1913), designed by William W. Bosworth; Emory University and Carnegie Mellon University (commissioned in 1908 and 1904, respectively), both designed by Henry Hornbostel; and the University of Texas (commissioned in 1931), designed by Paul Philippe Cret.

While the style of Beaux-Art buildings was adapted from historical models, the construction used the most modern available technology. The Grand Palais in Paris (1897–1900) had a modern iron frame inside; the classical columns were purely for decoration. The 1914–1916 construction of the Carolands Chateau south of San Francisco was built to withstand earthquakes, following the devastating 1906 San Francisco earthquake. The noted Spanish structural engineer Rafael Guastavino (1842–1908), famous for his vaultings, known as Guastavino tile work, designed vaults in dozens of Beaux-Arts buildings in Boston, New York, and elsewhere.

Beaux-Arts architecture also brought a civic face to railroads. Chicago's Union Station, Detroit's Michigan Central Station, Jacksonville's Union Terminal, Grand Central Terminal and the original Pennsylvania Station in New York, and Washington, D.C.'s Union Station are famous American examples of this style. Cincinnati has a number of notable Beaux-Arts style buildings, including the Hamilton County Memorial Building in the Over-the-Rhine neighborhood, and the former East End Carnegie library in the Columbia-Tusculum neighborhood.

Two notable ecclesiastical variants on the Beaux-Arts style—both serving the same archdiocese, and both designed by the same architect—stand in the Twin Cities of Minneapolis–Saint Paul, Minnesota. Minneapolis' Basilica of St. Mary, the first basilica constructed and consecrated in the United States, was designed by Franco-American architect Emmanuel Louis Masqueray (1861–1917) and opened in 1914. A year later in neighboring Saint Paul, construction of the massive Masqueray-designed Cathedral of Saint Paul (also known as National Shrine Cathedral of the Apostle Paul) was completed. The third-largest Roman Catholic cathedral in the United States, its architecture predominantly reflects Beaux-Arts principles, into which Masqueray integrated stylistic elements of other celebrated French churches.

Other examples include the main branch of the New York Public Library; Bancroft Hall at the Naval Academy, the largest academic dormitory in the world; and Michigan Central Station in Detroit, the tallest railway station in the world at the time of completion.

===== Beaux-Arts architects in the United States =====
In the late 1800s, during the years when Beaux-Arts architecture was at a peak in France, Americans were one of the largest groups of foreigners in Paris. Many of them were architects and students of architecture who brought this style back to America. The following individuals, students of the École des Beaux-Arts, are identified as creating work characteristic of the Beaux-Arts style within the United States:

- Otto Eugene Adams
- William A. Boring
- William W. Bosworth
- Arthur Brown Jr.
- Daniel Burnham
- Carrère and Hastings
- James Edwin Ruthven Carpenter Jr.
- Paul Philippe Cret
- Edward Emmett Dougherty
- James Francis Dunn
- Douglas Ellington
- Ernest Flagg
- Robert W. Gibson
- C. P. H. Gilbert
- Cass Gilbert
- Philip L. Goodwin
- Thomas Hastings
- Raymond Hood
- Henry Hornbostel
- John Galen Howard
- Richard Morris Hunt
- Albert Kahn
- Charles Klauder
- Ellamae Ellis League
- Electus D. Litchfield
- Austin W. Lord
- Emmanuel Louis Masqueray
- William Rutherford Mead
- Julia Morgan
- Charles Follen McKim
- Harry B. Mulliken
- Kenneth MacKenzie Murchison
- Henry Orth
- Theodore Wells Pietsch I
- Willis Polk
- John Russell Pope
- Reed and Stem
- Arthur Wallace Rice
- Henry Hobson Richardson
- Francis Palmer Smith
- Louis Sullivan
- Edward Lippincott Tilton
- Evarts Tracy of Tracy and Swartwout
- Horace Trumbauer
- Enock Hill Turnock
- Whitney Warren
- Stanford White

Charles McKim, William Mead, and Stanford White would ultimately become partners in the prominent architectural firm of McKim, Mead & White, which designed many well-known Beaux-Arts buildings.

=== South America ===
==== Argentina ====
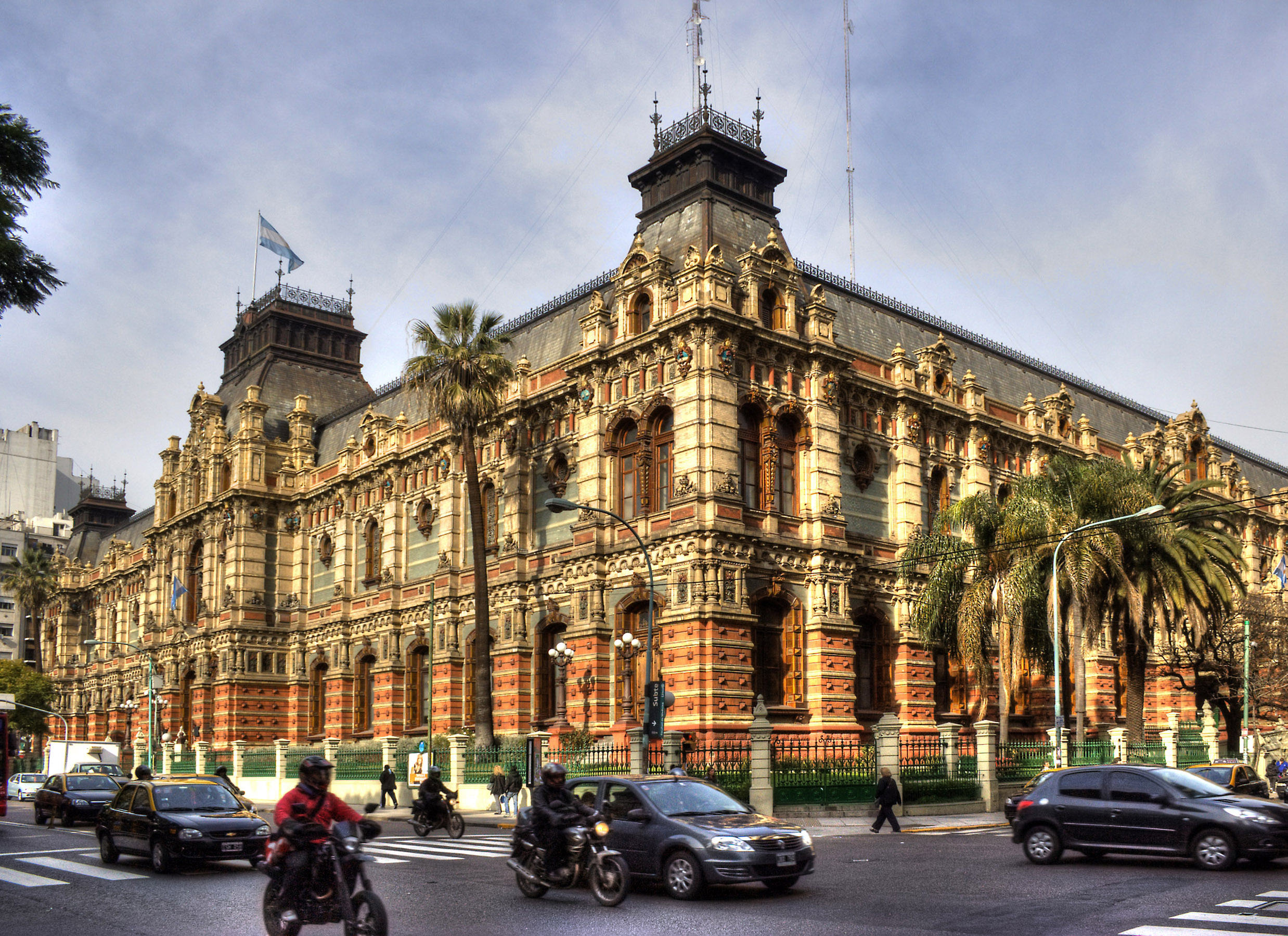
Palace of Running Waters, Buenos Aires

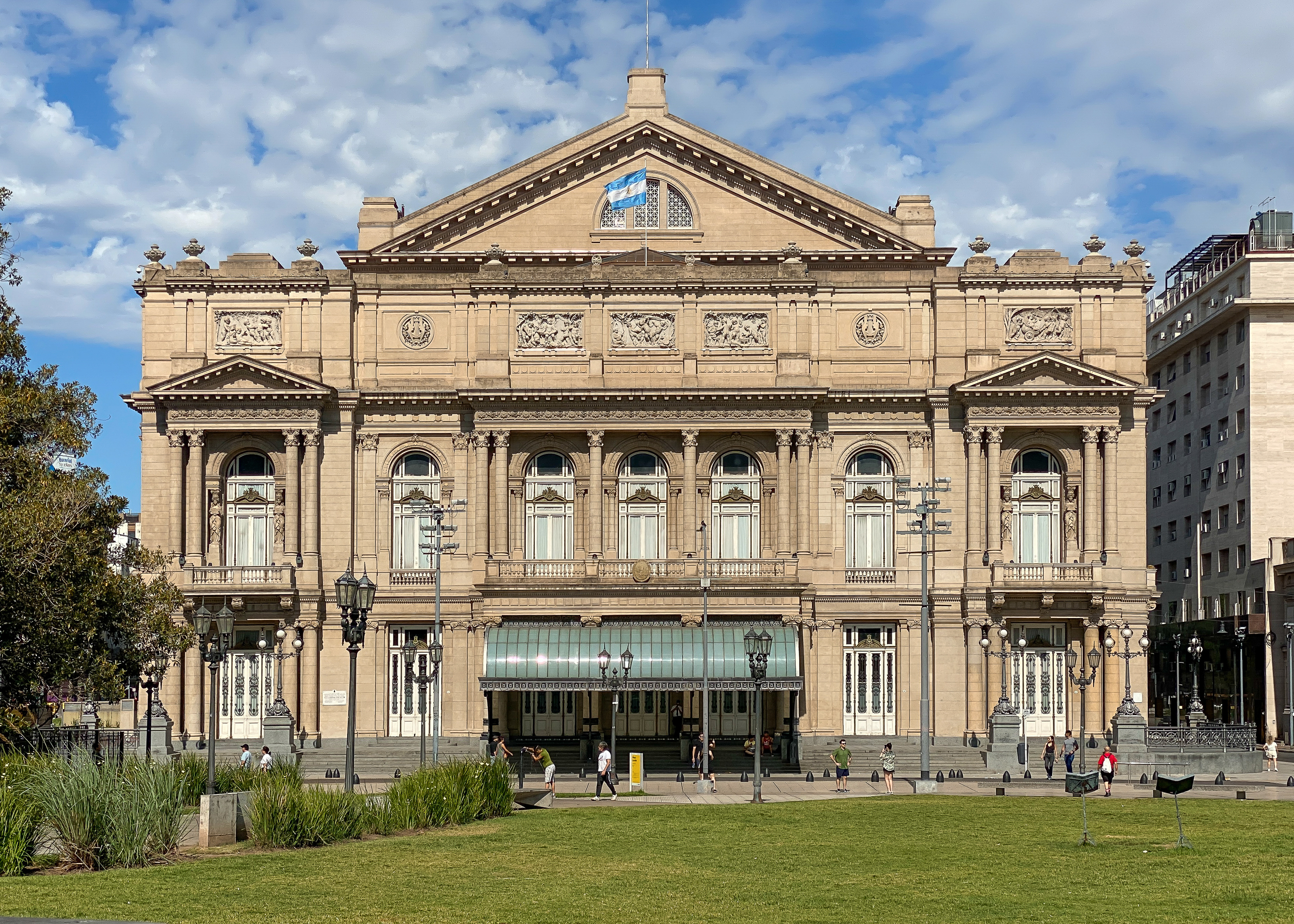
Teatro Colón, Buenos Aires

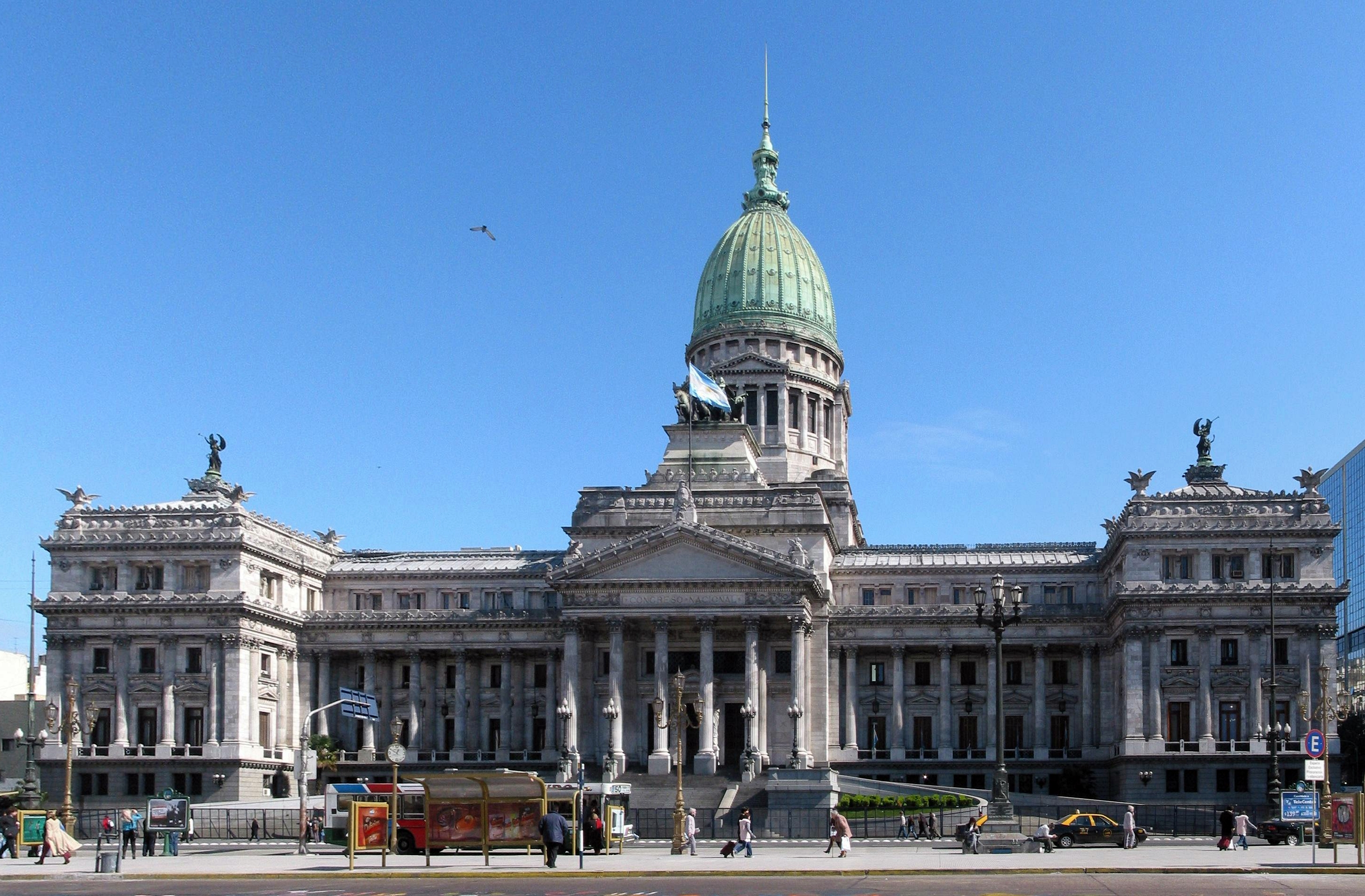
Palace of the Argentine National Congress, Buenos Aires

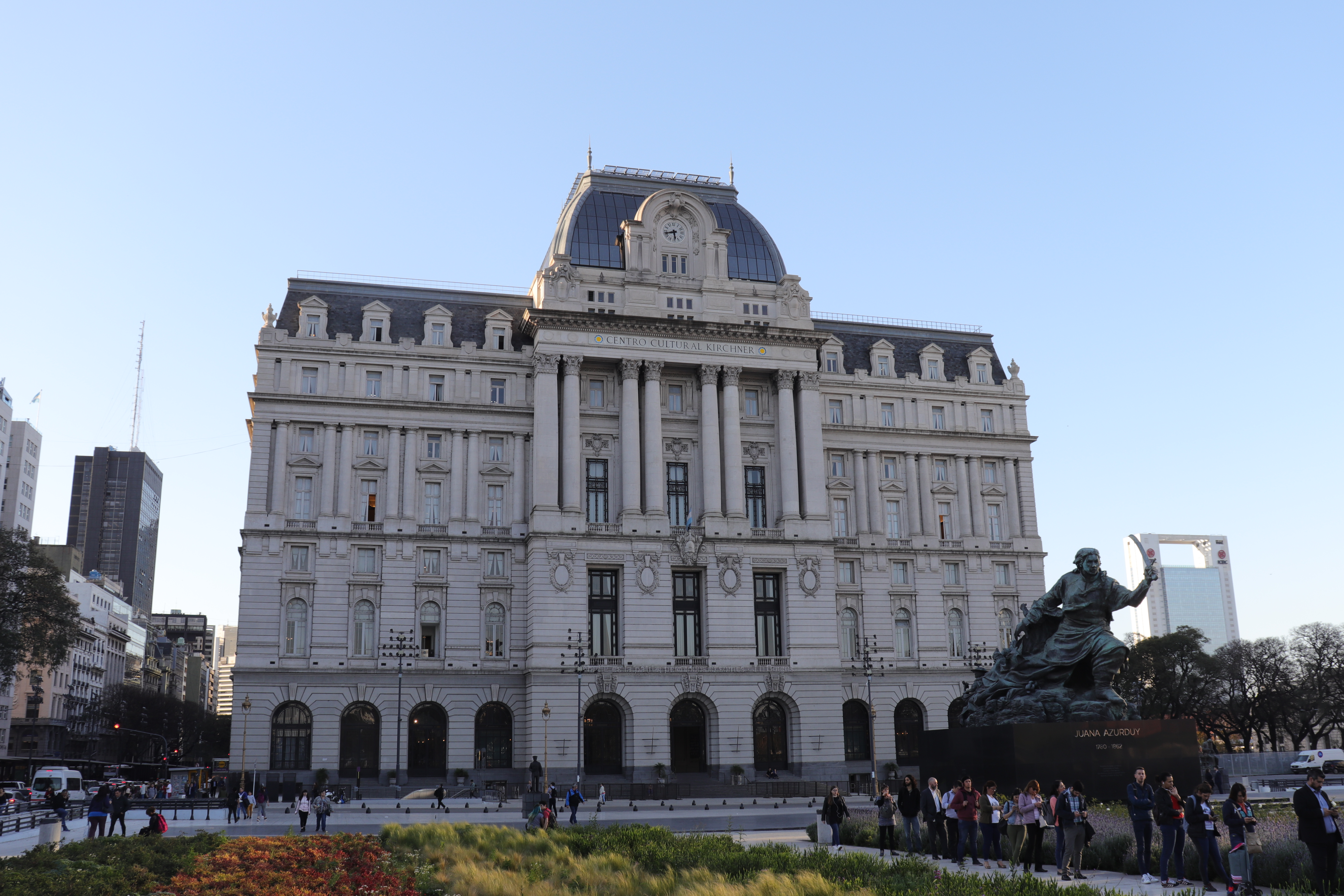
Libertad Palace, Buenos Aires

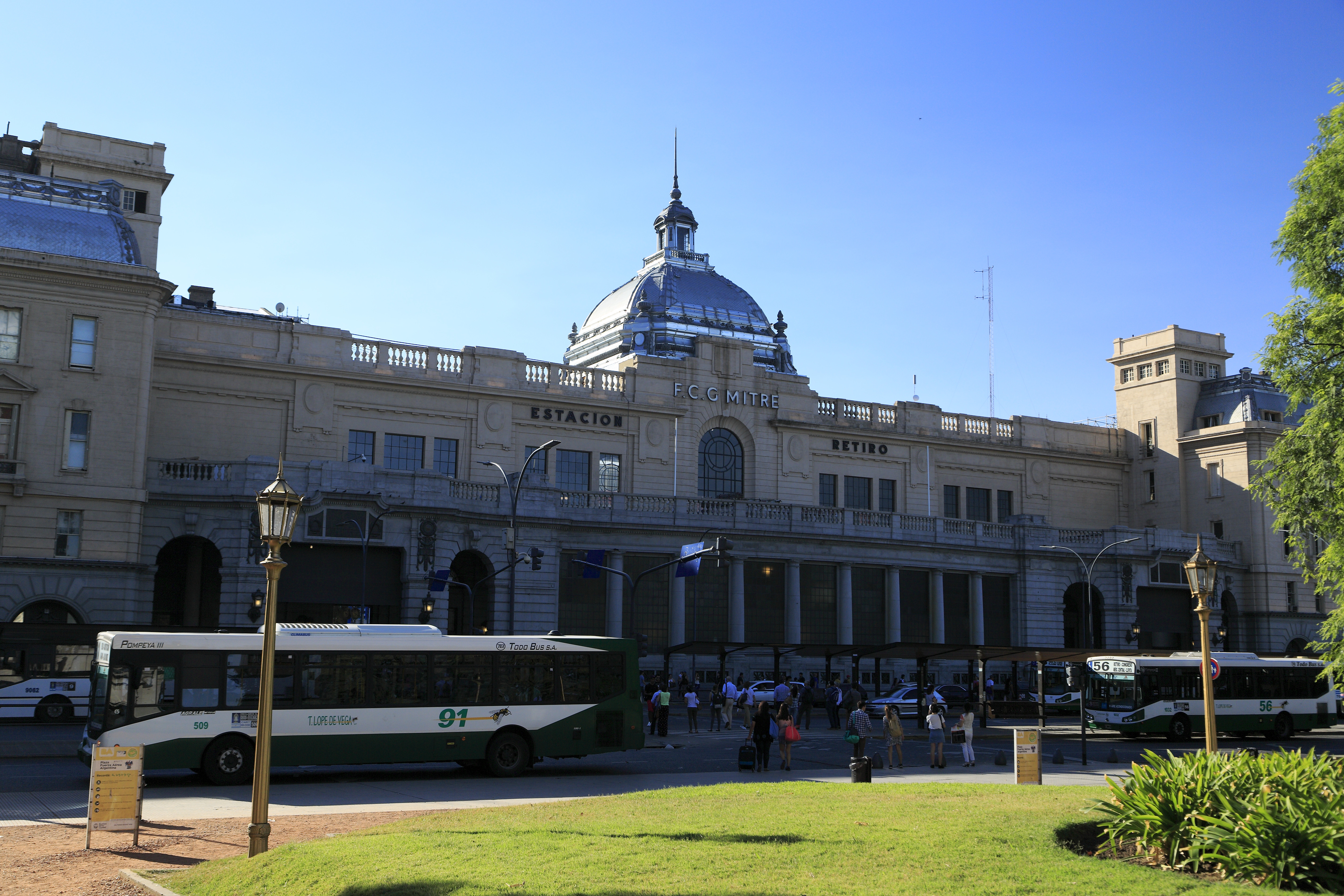
Retiro Mitre railway station, Buenos Aires

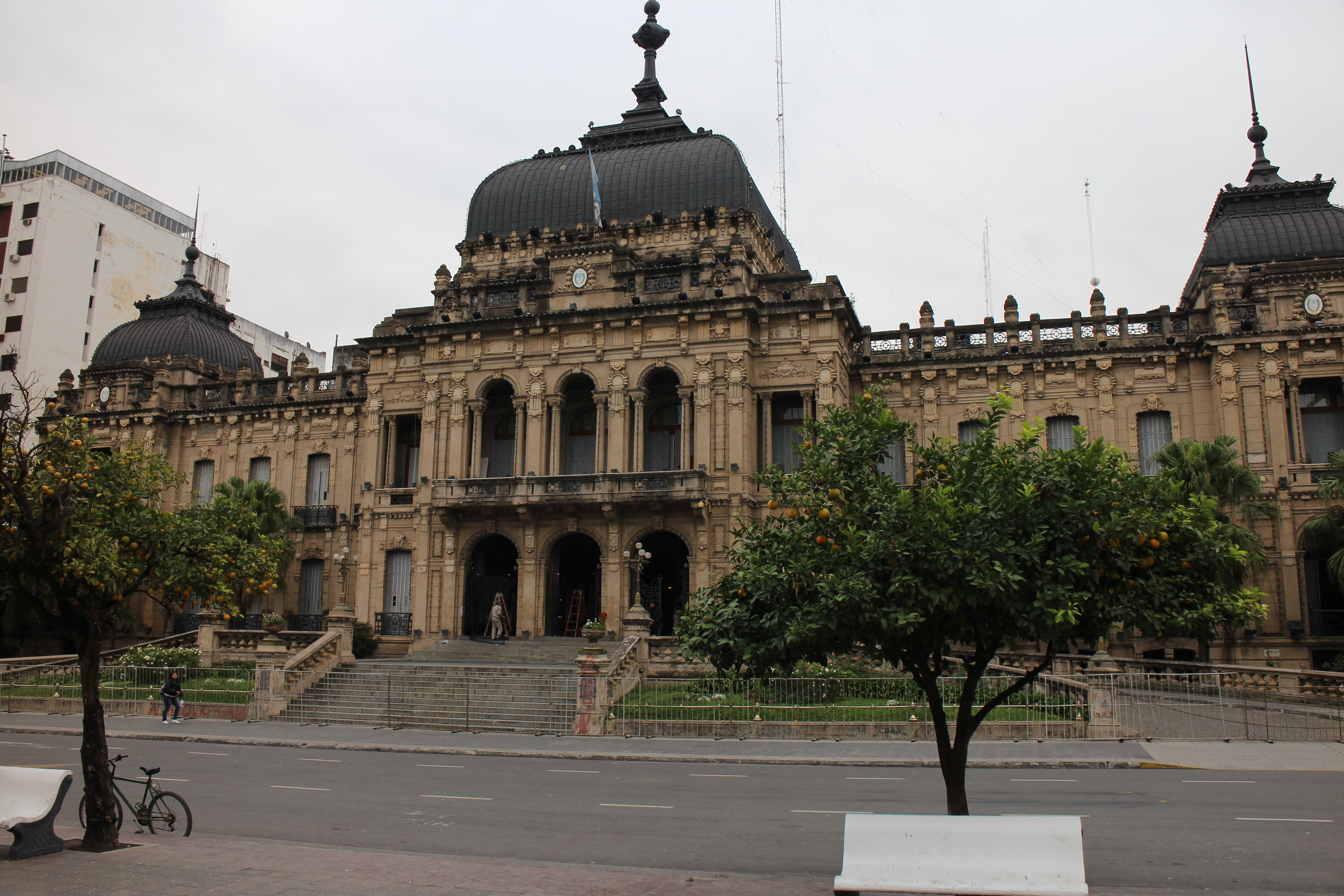
Tucumán Government Palace, San Miguel de Tucumán

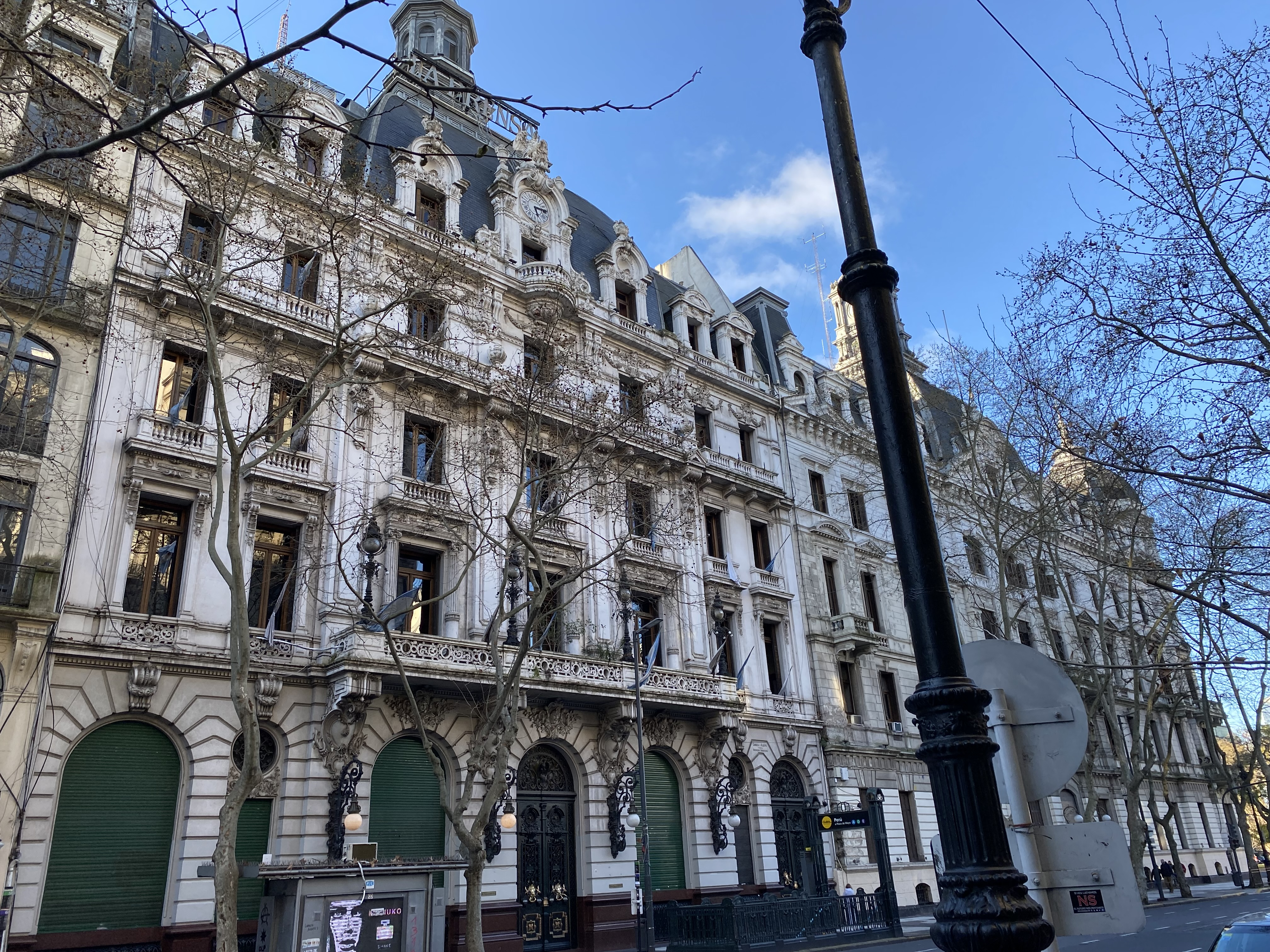
Buenos Aires House of Culture, Buenos Aires

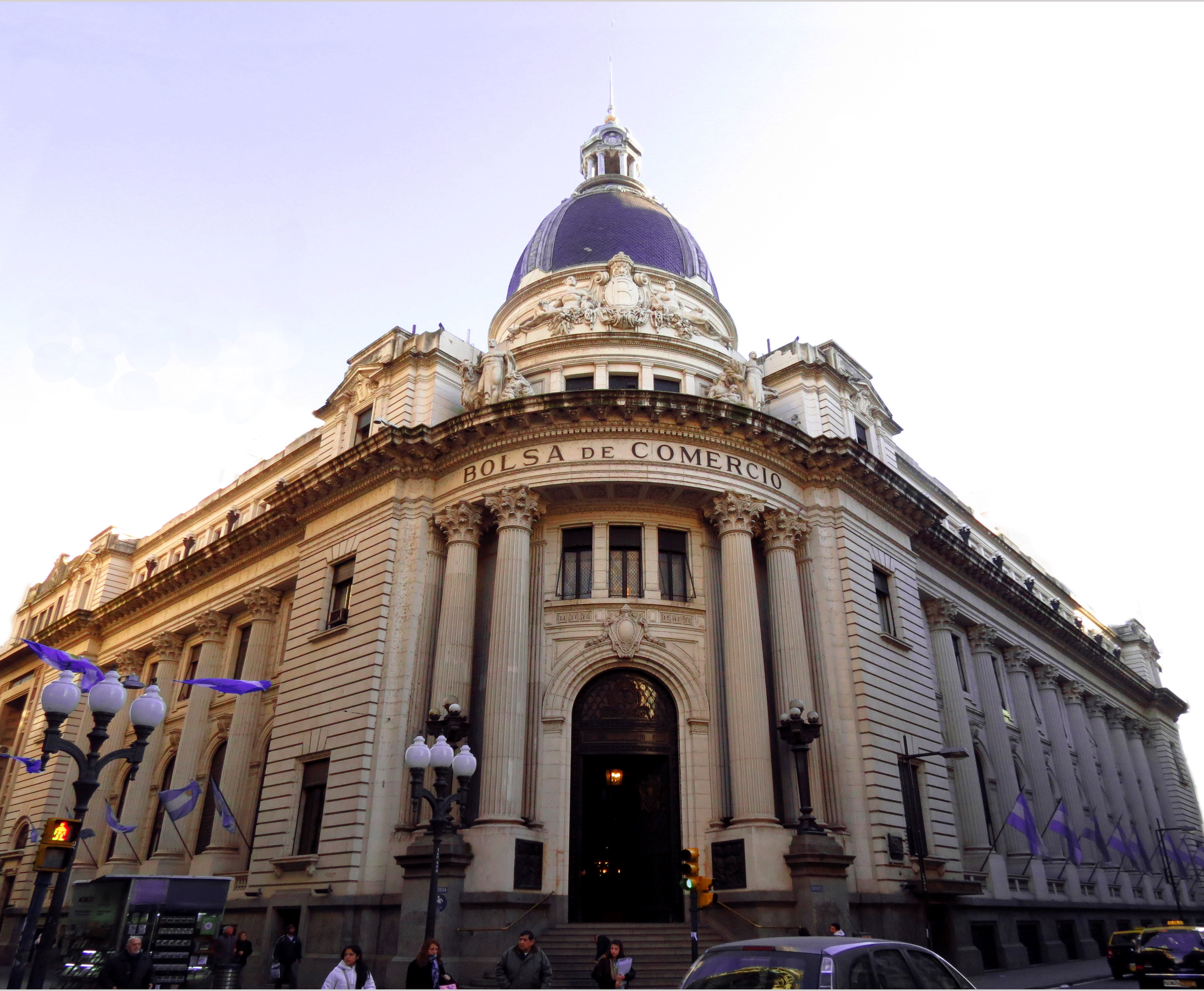
Rosario Board of Trade, Rosario

From 1880 the so-called Generation of '80 came to power in Argentine politics. These were admirers of France as a model republic, particularly with regard to culture and aesthetic tastes. Buenos Aires is a center of Beaux-Arts architecture which continued to be built as late as the 1950s.

===== Beaux-Arts buildings in Argentina =====
- 1877–1894: Palace of Running Waters, Buenos Aires
- 1883–1887: Unzué Palace, Buenos Aires
- 1889–1908: Teatro Colón, Buenos Aires
- 1889: Pabellón Argentino (Argentine pavilion from the 1889 Paris Exposition Universelle), taken down and reconstructed in Buenos Aires (demolished in 1932)
- 1890: Estación Mar del Plata Sud, Mar del Plata (the train station was closed in 1949, and was later damaged by fire. Although it was renovated, it is today much less adorned)
- 1894–1898: Buenos Aires House of Culture, Buenos Aires
- 1898–1906: Palace of the Argentine National Congress, Buenos Aires
- 1908–1910: Club Mar del Plata, Mar del Plata (burned down in 1961)
- 1908–1928: Libertad Palace, Buenos Aires
- 1908–1910: Tucumán Government Palace, San Miguel de Tucumán
- 1924–1929: Estrugamou Building, Buenos Aires
- 1926–1931: Buenos Aires City Legislature Palace, Buenos Aires

===== Beaux-Arts architects in Argentina =====
- Alejandro Bustillo
- Julio Dormal
- Gainza y Agote
- Alejandro Christophersen
- Eduardo Le Monnier
- León Dourge (later an exponent of rationalism)
- Paul Pater
- Jacques Dunant
- Norbert Maillart
- Carlos Thays (landscape architect)

==== Brazil ====
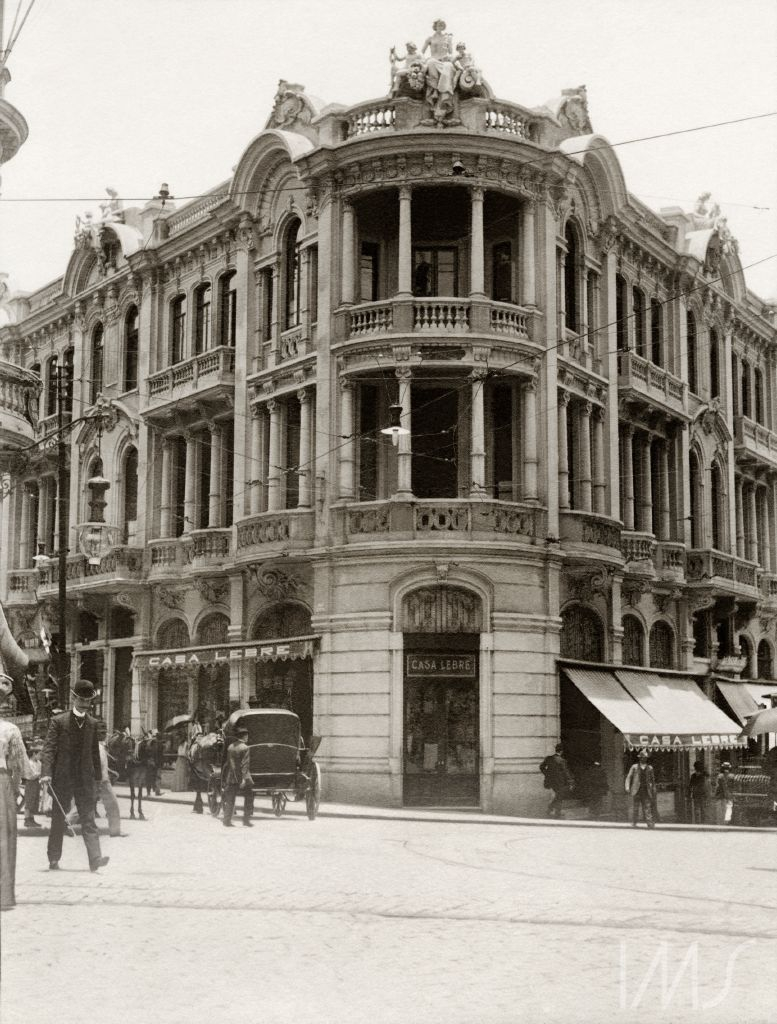
Casa Lebre, São Paulo

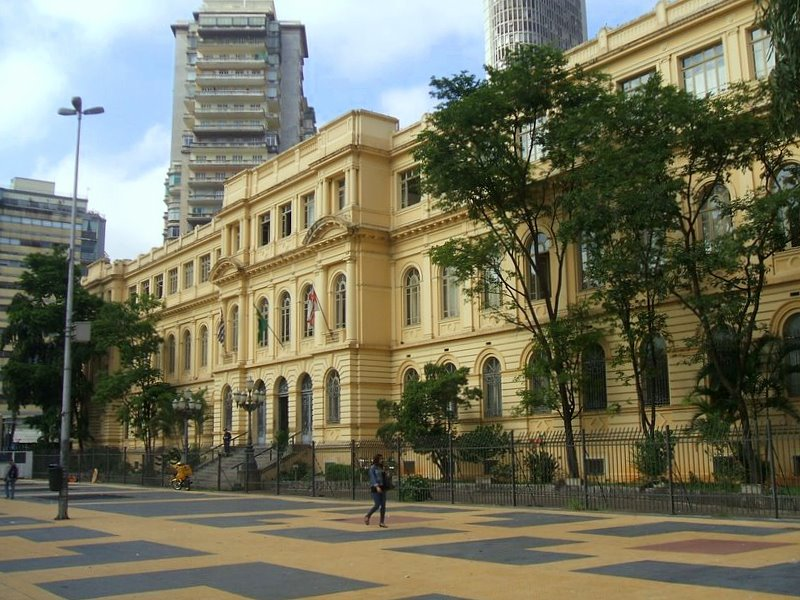
Caetano de Campos House, São Paulo

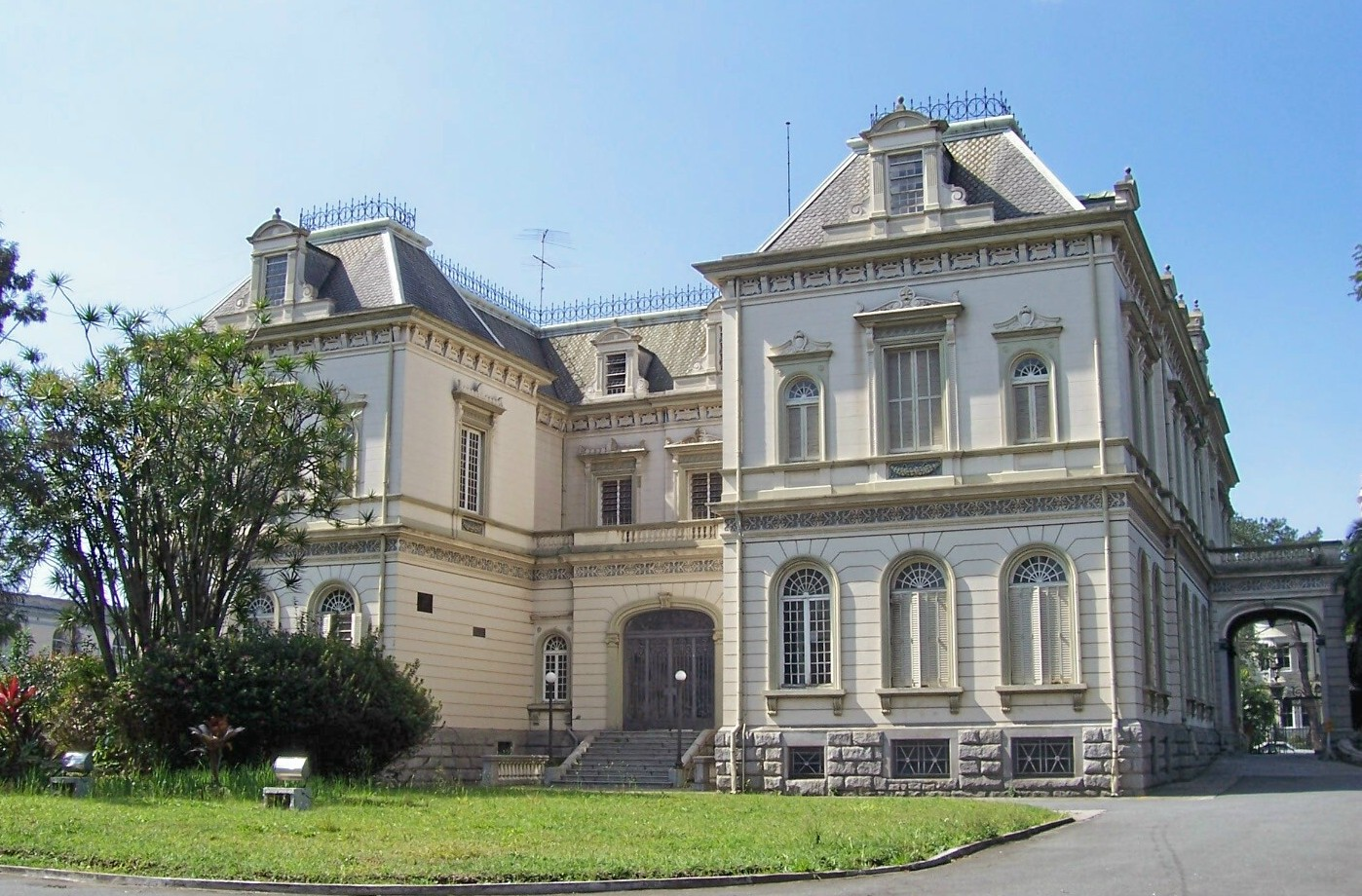
Palace of the Champs Elysees, São Paulo

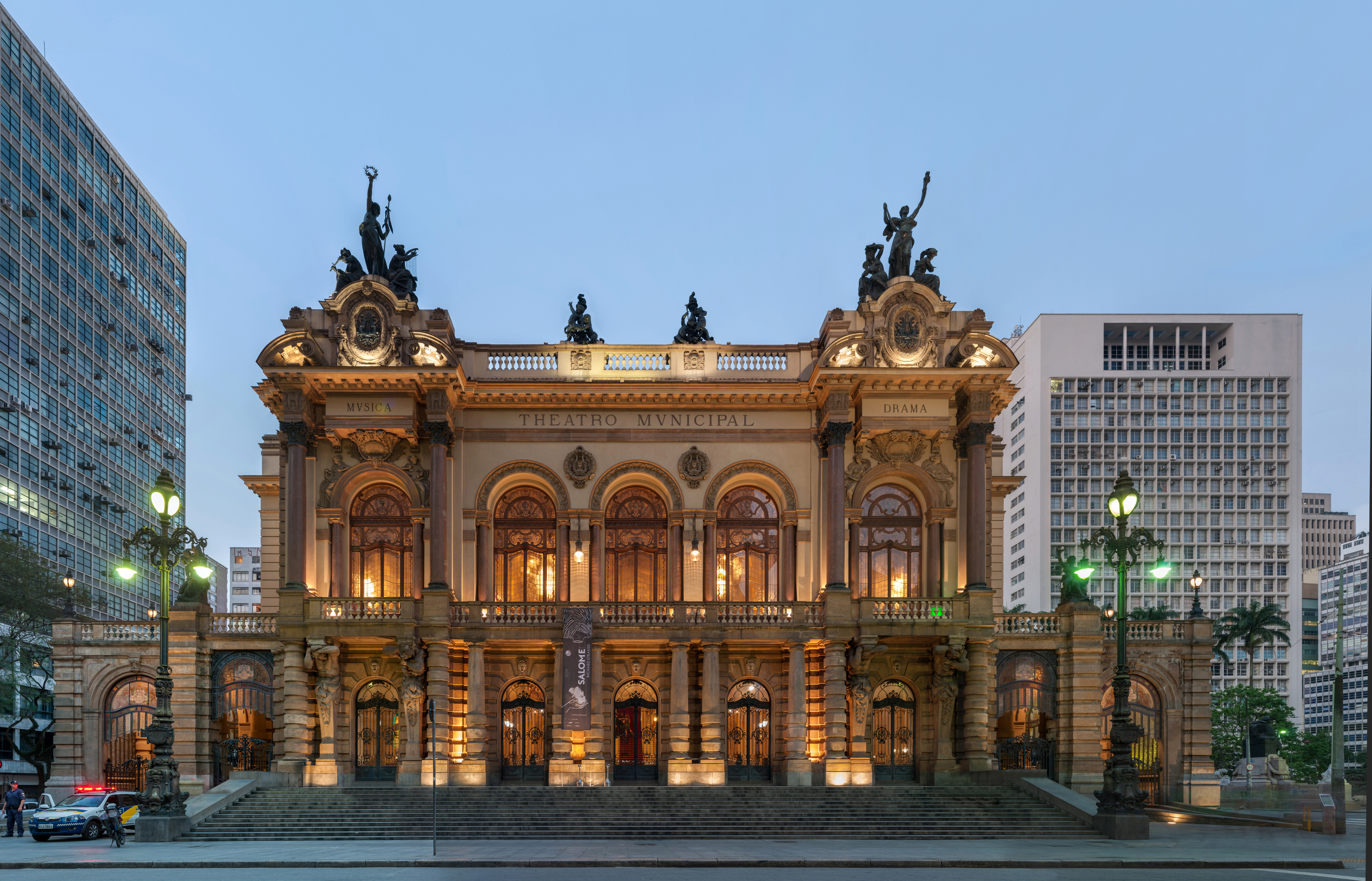
Municipal Theater of São Paulo

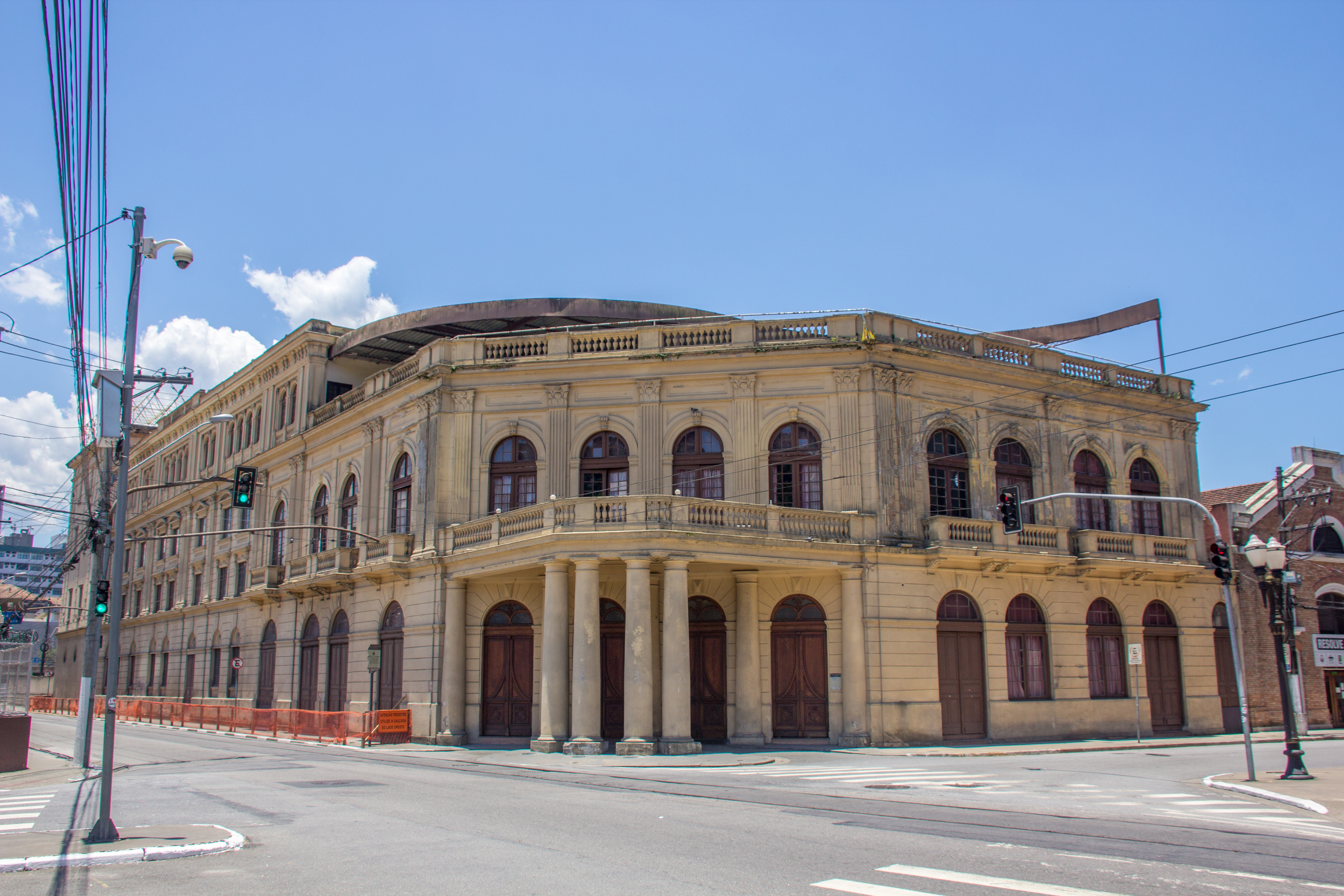
Coliseu Santista Theater, Santos

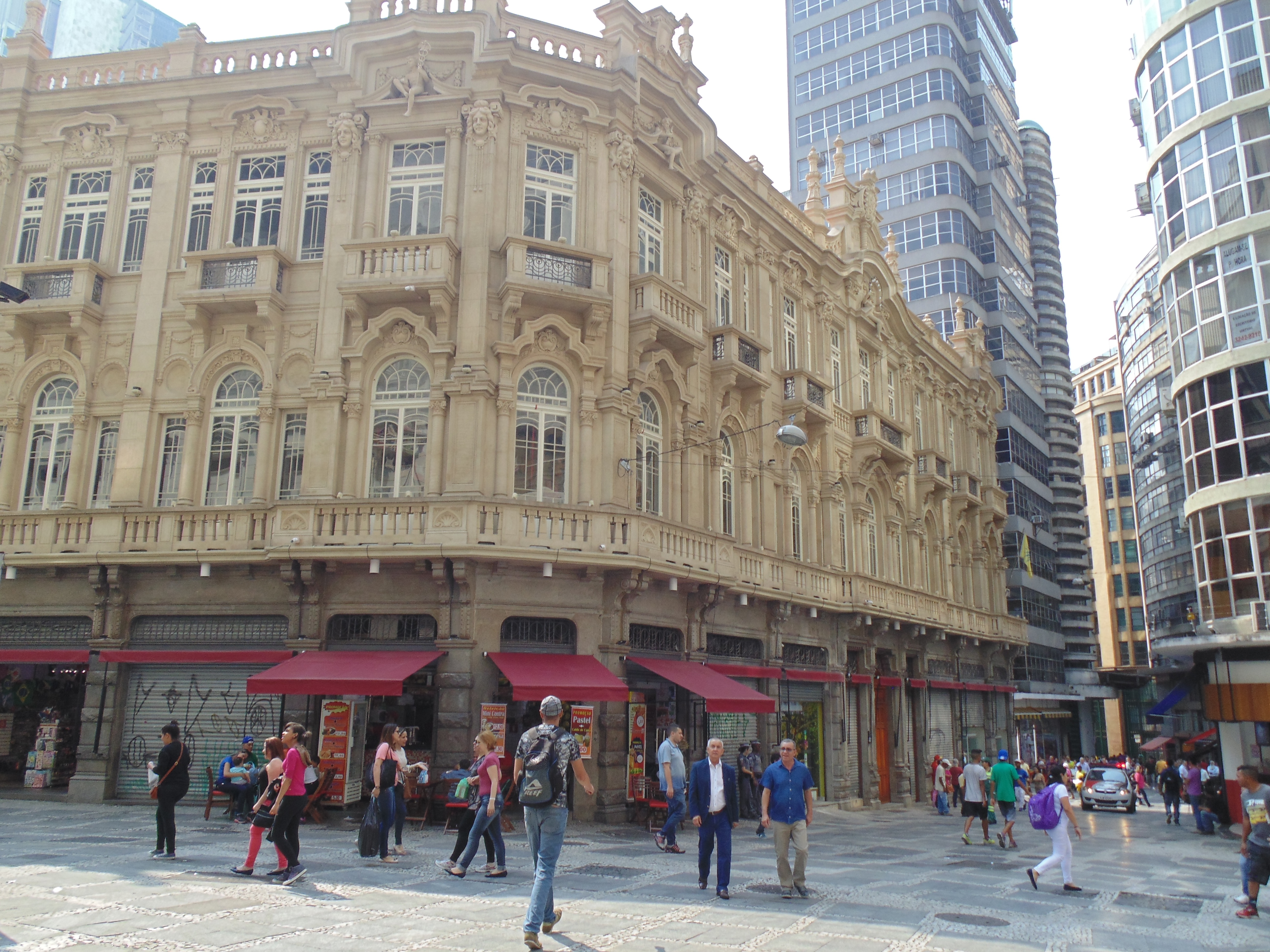
Tereza Toledo Lara Palace, São Paulo

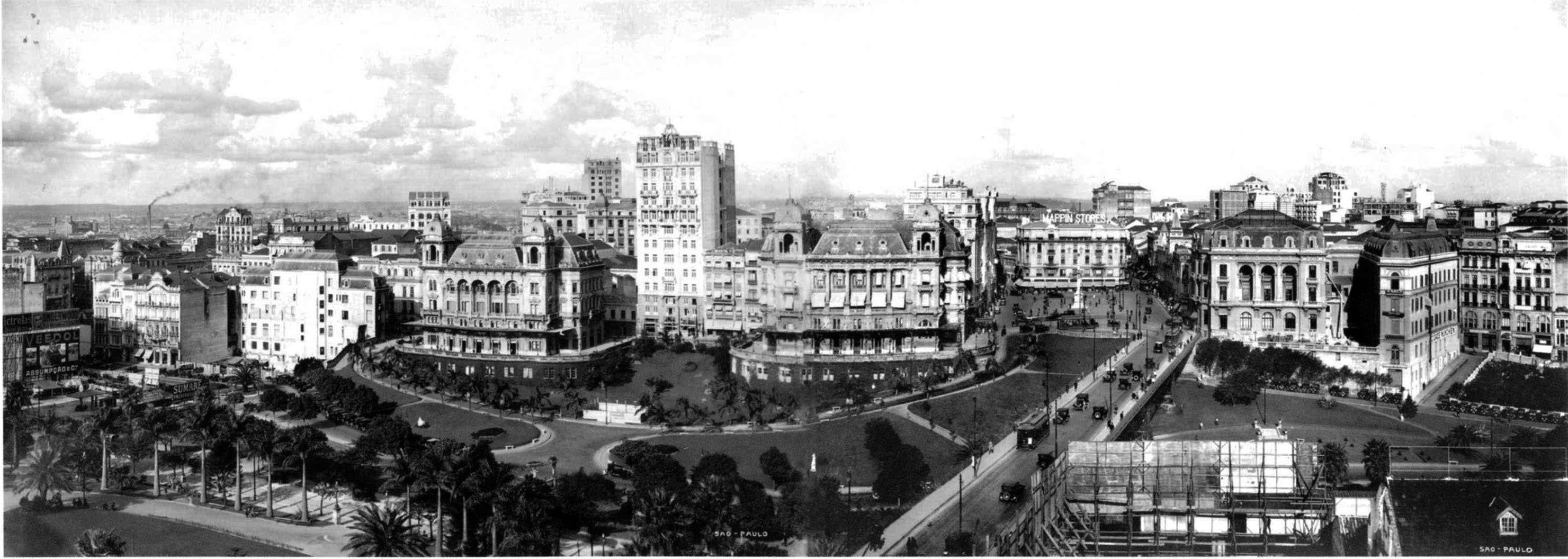
Prates Mansions, São Paulo

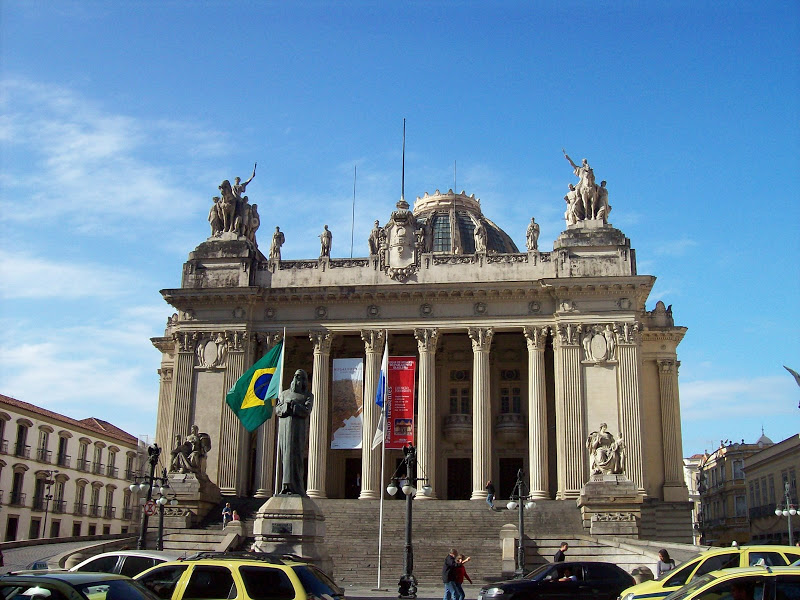
Tiradentes Palace, Rio de Janeiro

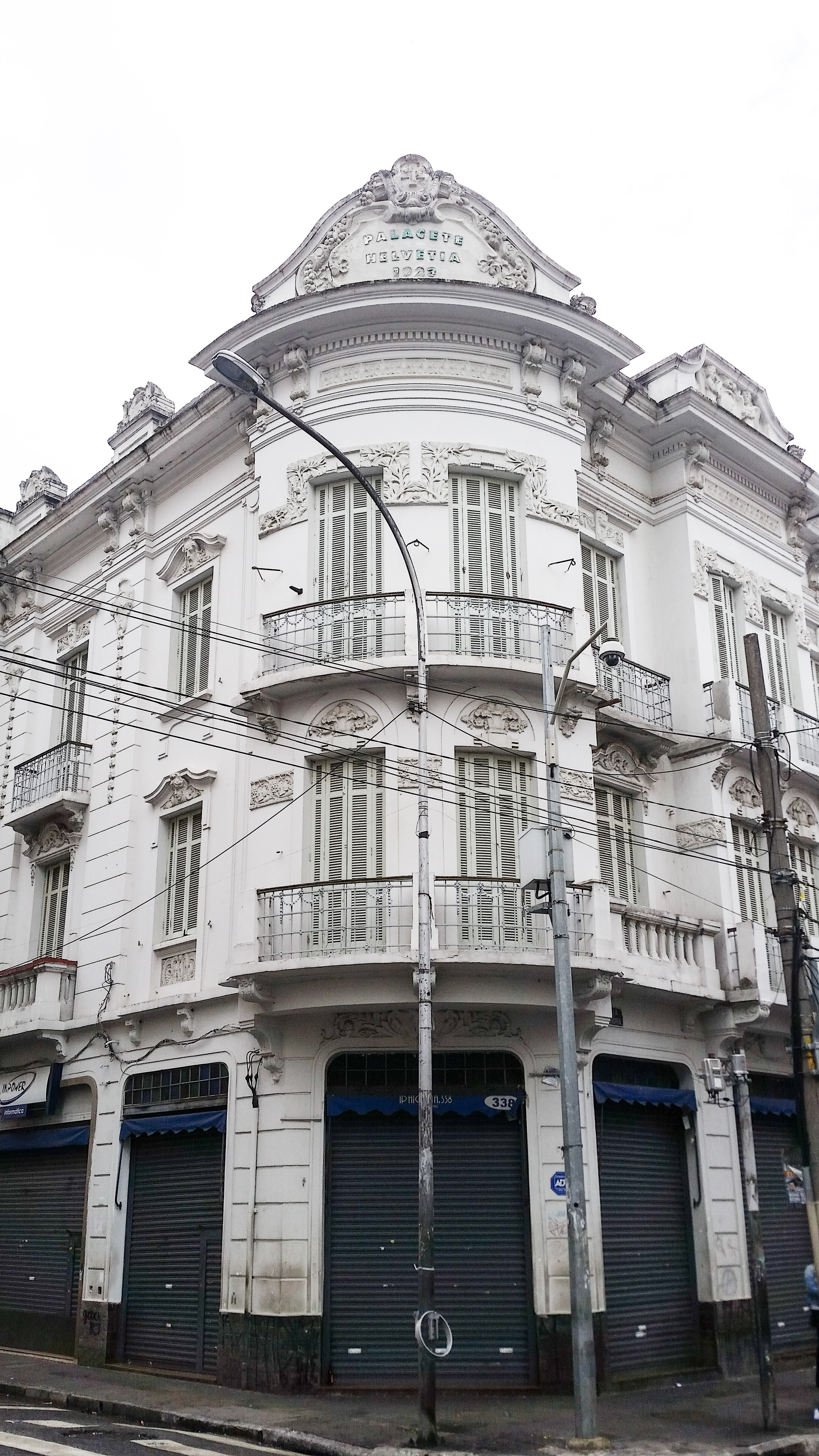
Helvetia Palace, São Paulo

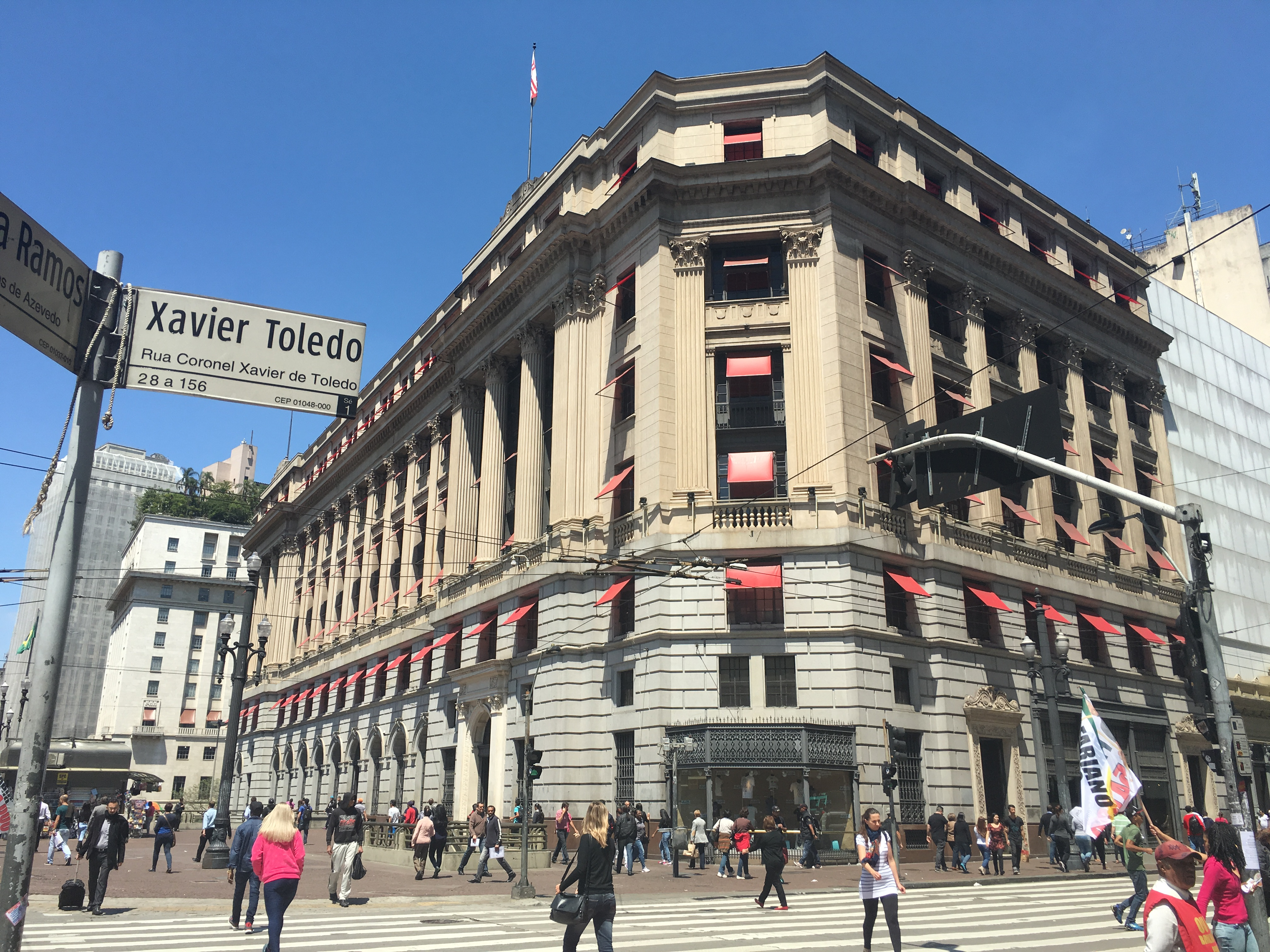
Alexandre Mackenzie Building, São Paulo

===== Beaux-Arts buildings in Brazil =====
- 1858: Casa Lebre, São Paulo
- 1890–1894: Casa Caetano de Campos, São Paulo
- 1896–1899: Palace of the Champs Elysees, São Paulo
- 1903–1911: Municipal Theater of São Paulo
- 1909: Coliseu Santista Theater, Santos, São Paulo
- 1910: Tereza Toledo Lara Palace, São Paulo
- 1911: Prates Mansions, São Paulo
- 1922–1926: Tiradentes Palace, Rio de Janeiro
- 1923: Helvetia Palace, São Paulo
- 1926–1929: Alexandre Mackenzie Building, São Paulo
- Artemis Hotel, São Paulo
- Banco de São Paulo Building, São Paulo
- Hôtel de La Rotisserie Sportsman, São Paulo
- Mococa Building, São Paulo

==== Colombia ====
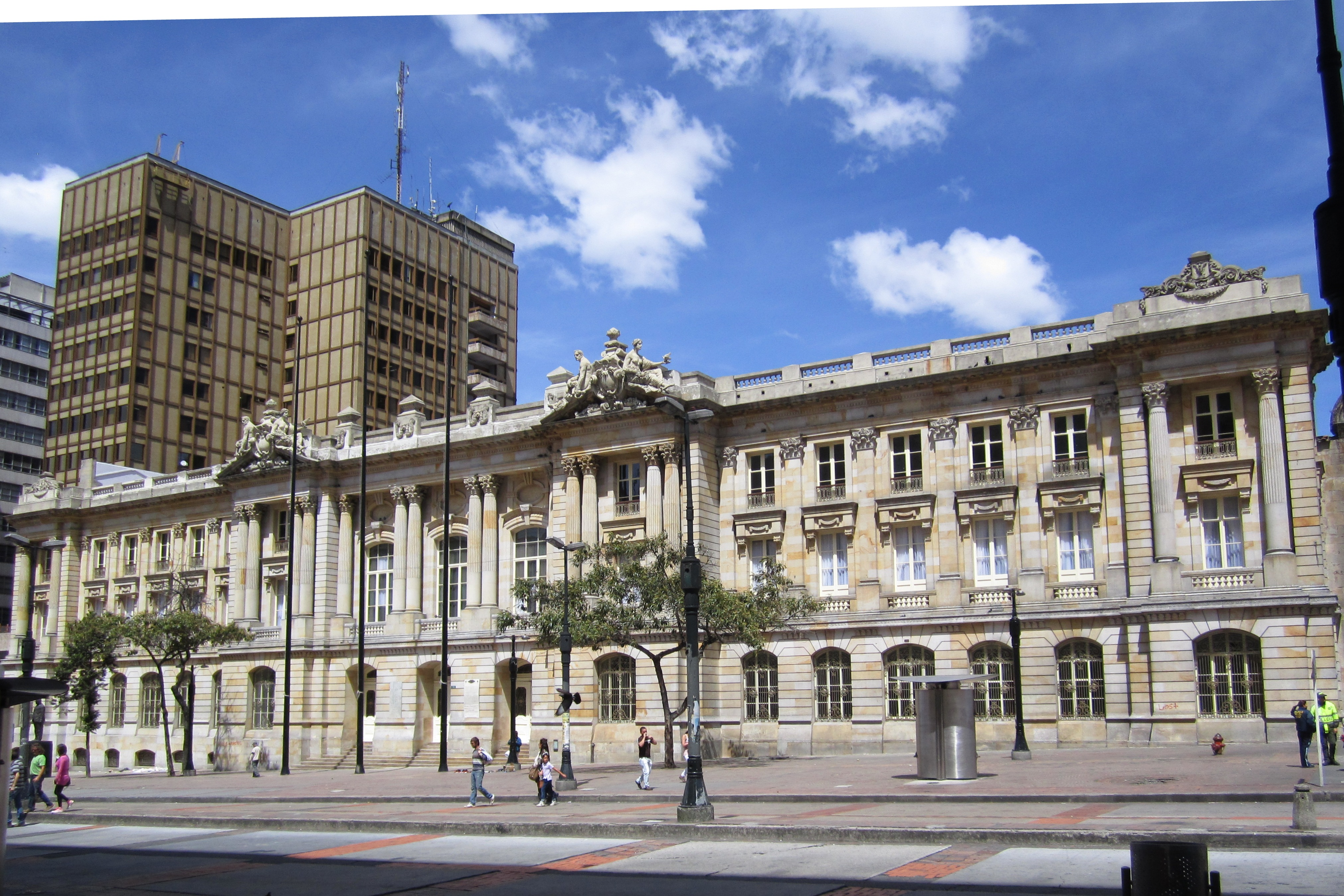
Palacio de San Francisco, Bogotá

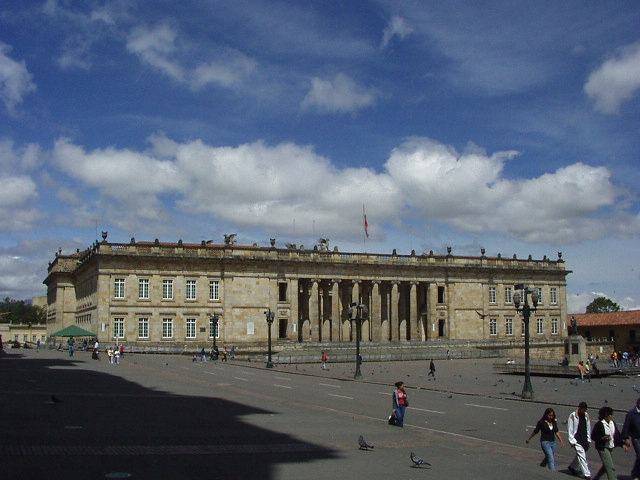
Capitolio nacional, Bogotá

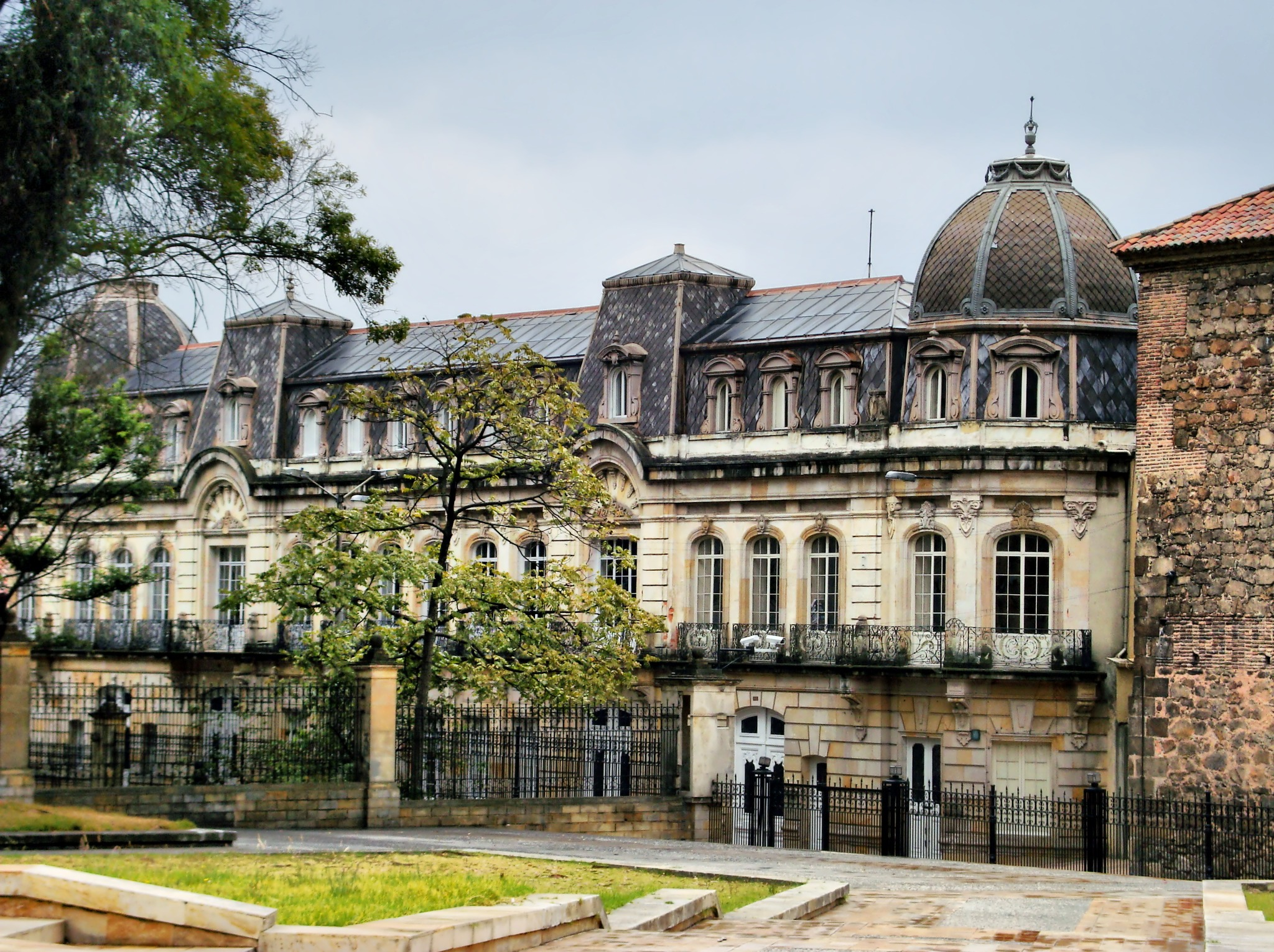
Palacio Echeverri, Bogotá

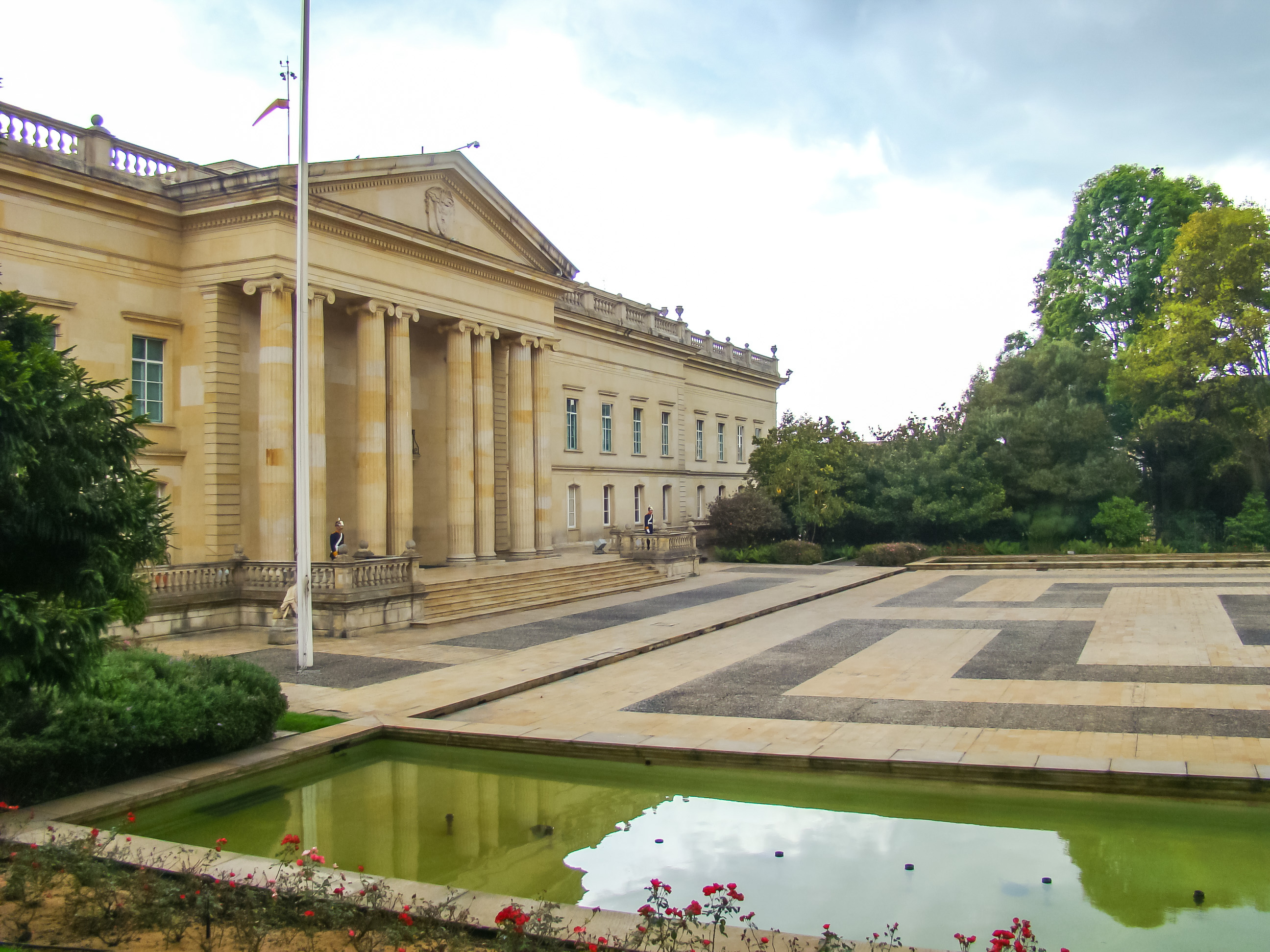
Casa de Nariño, Bogotá

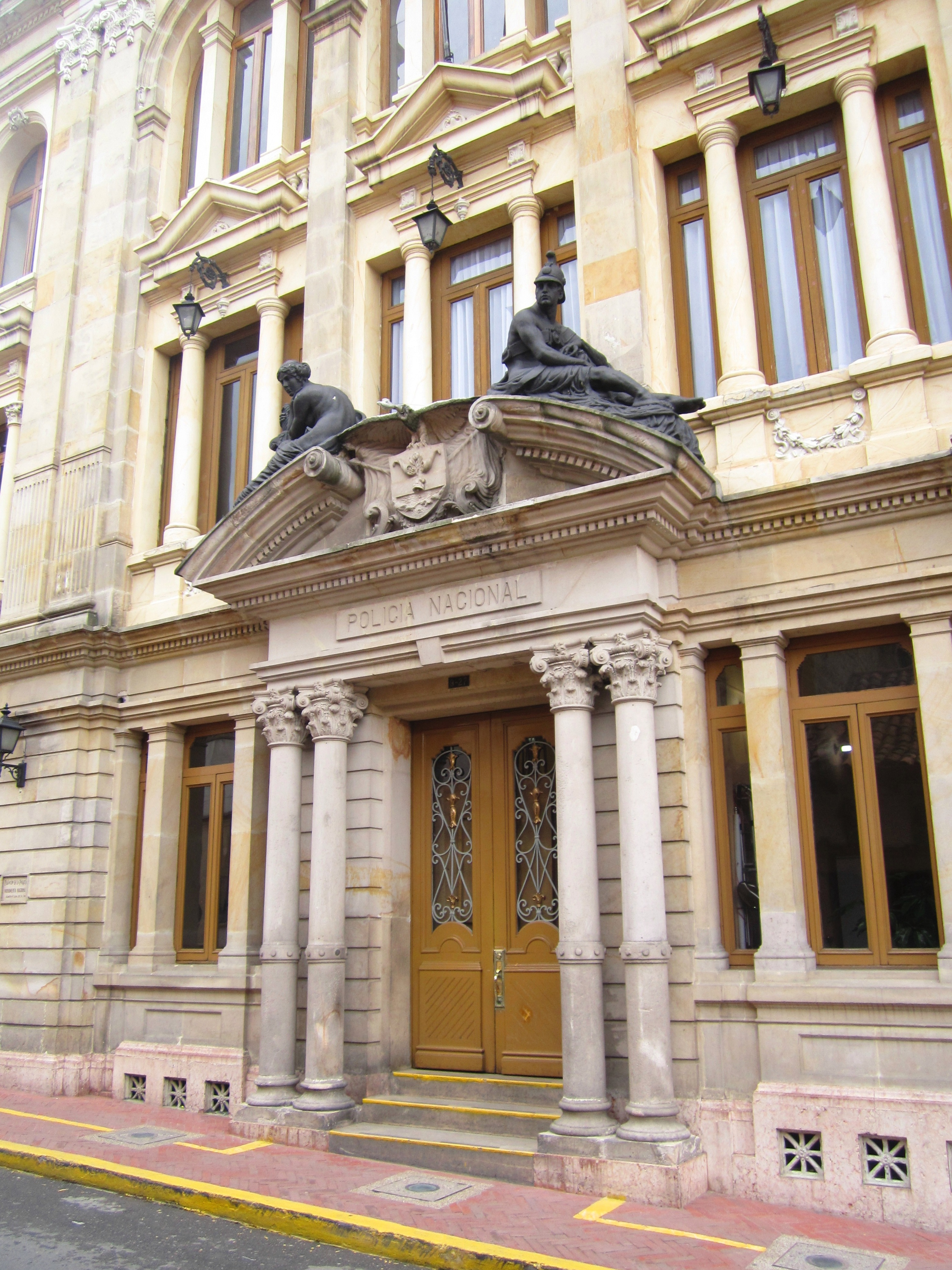
Museo de la Policía, Bogotá

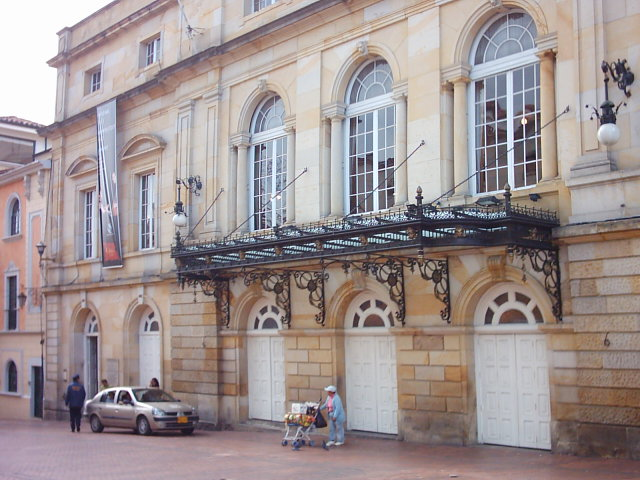
Teatro Colón, Bogotá

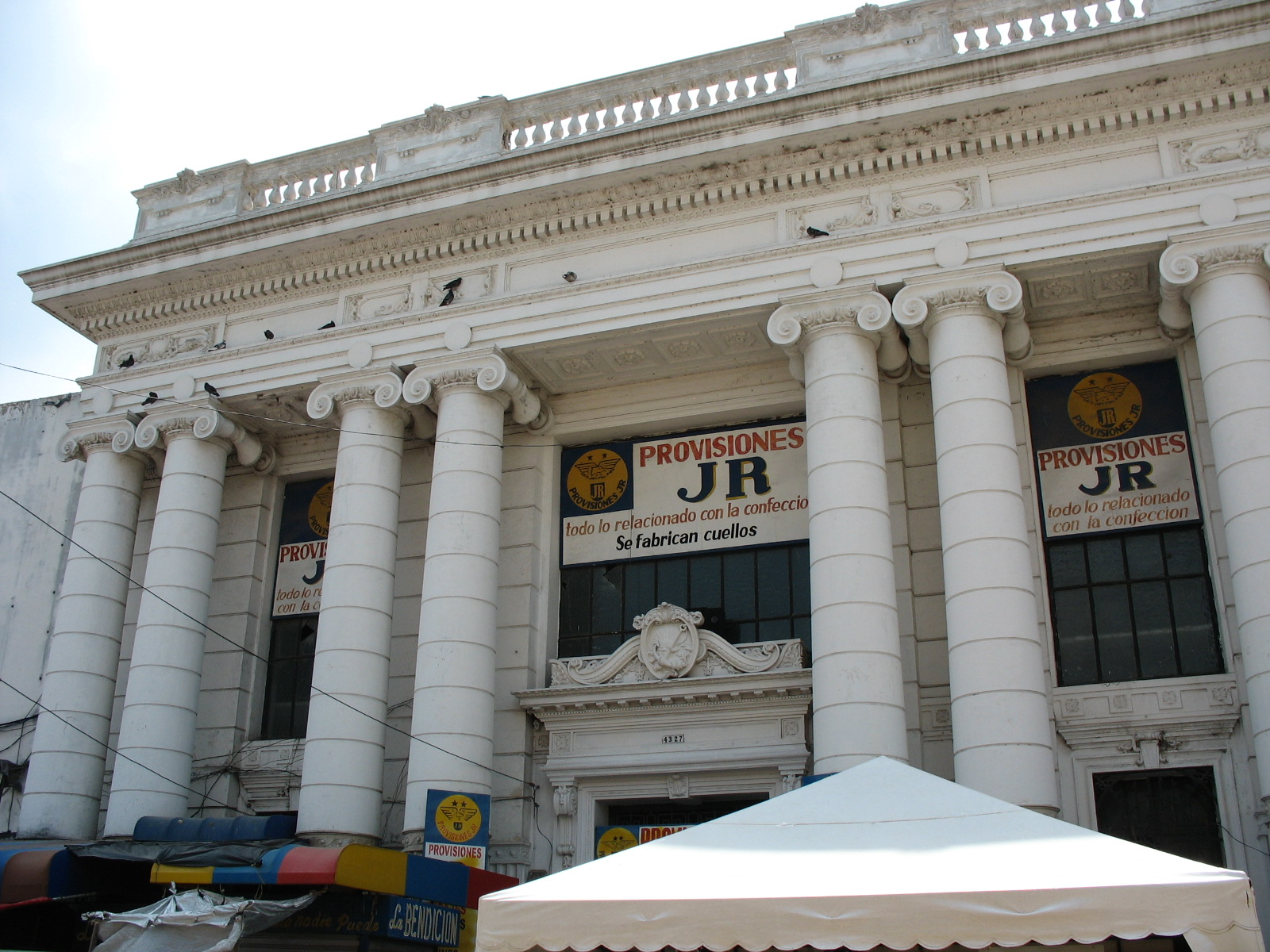
Banco Dugand, Barranquilla

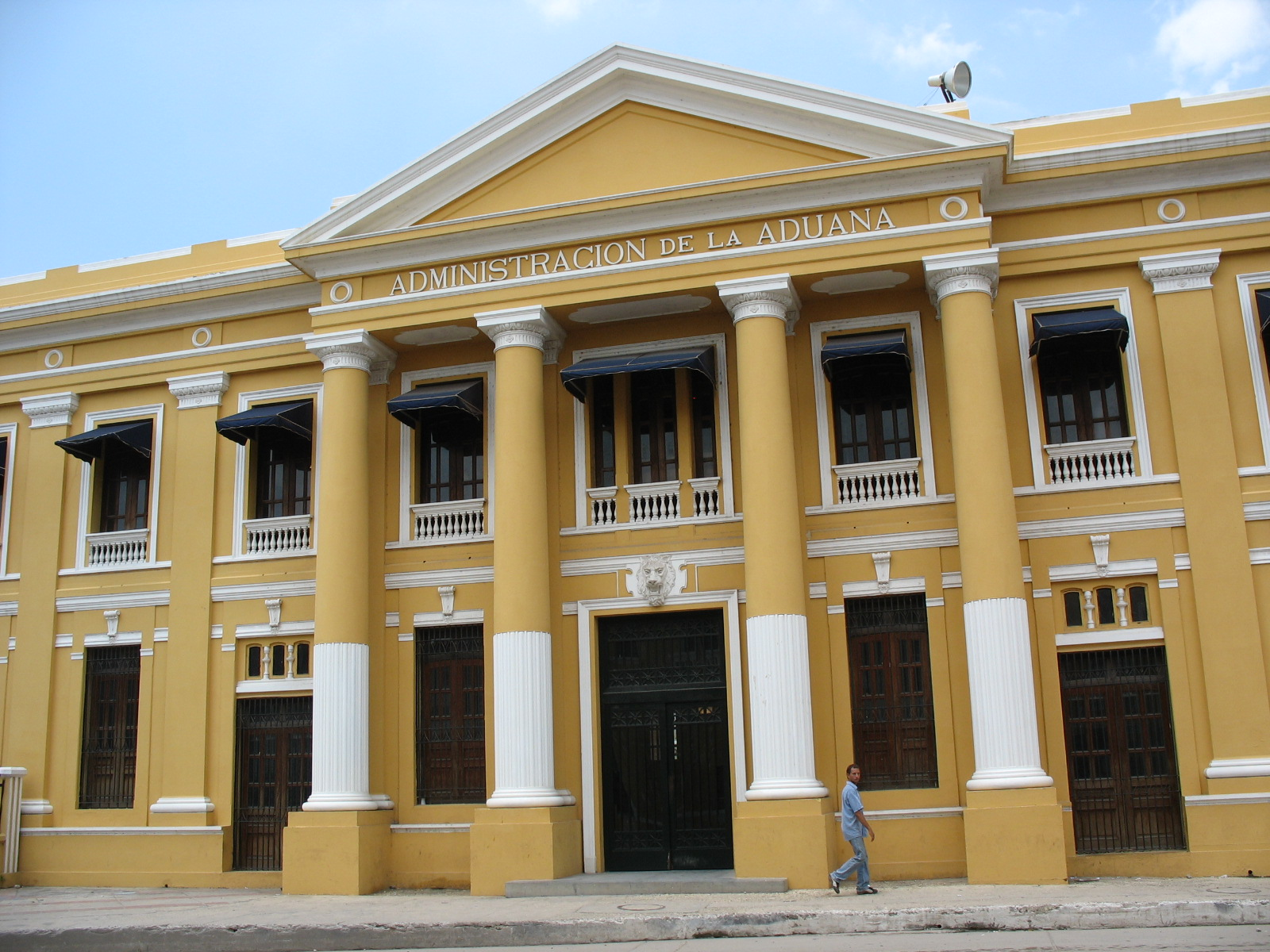
Antigua Aduana, Barranquilla

==== Peru ====
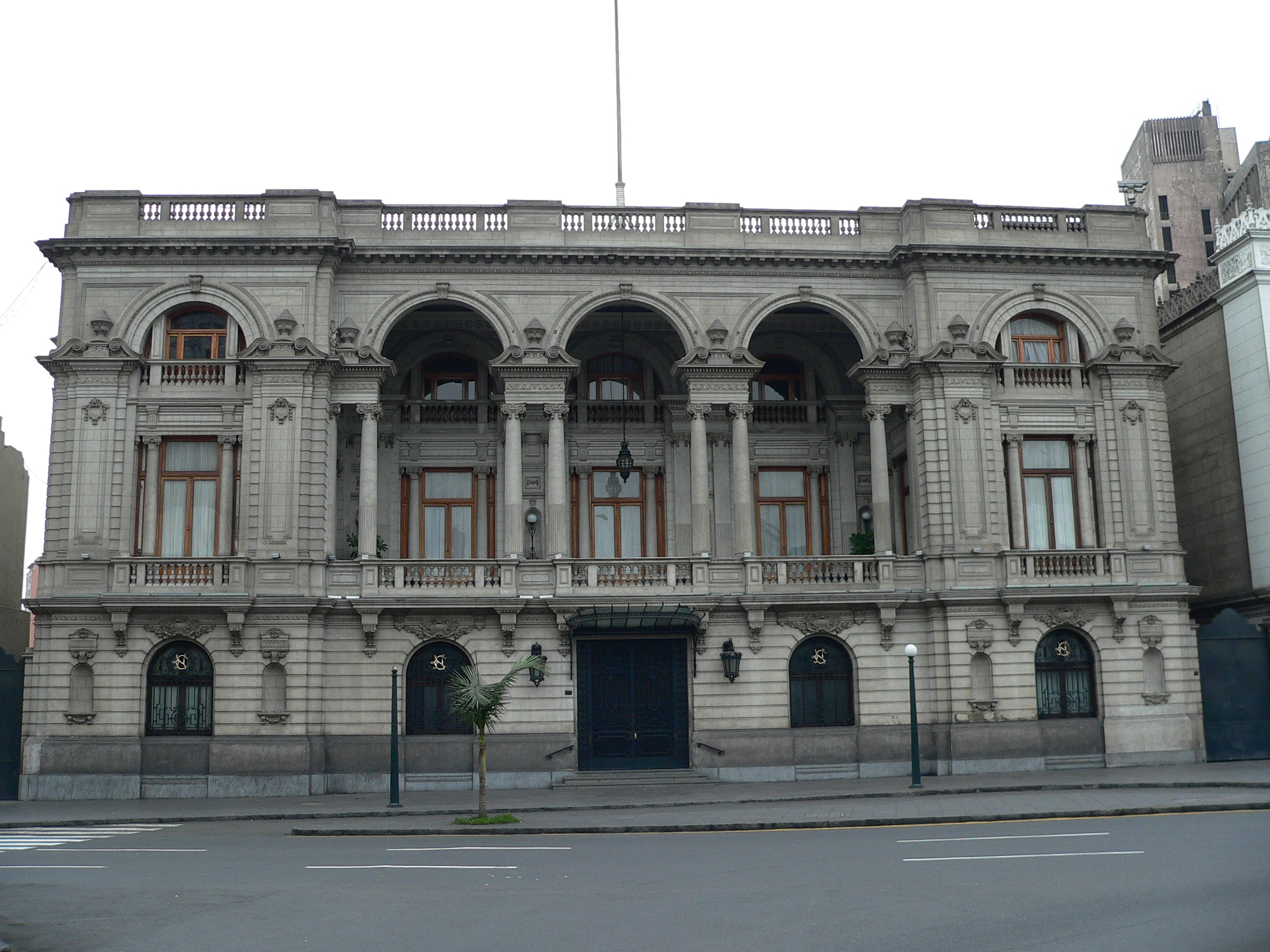
Club Nacional, Lima

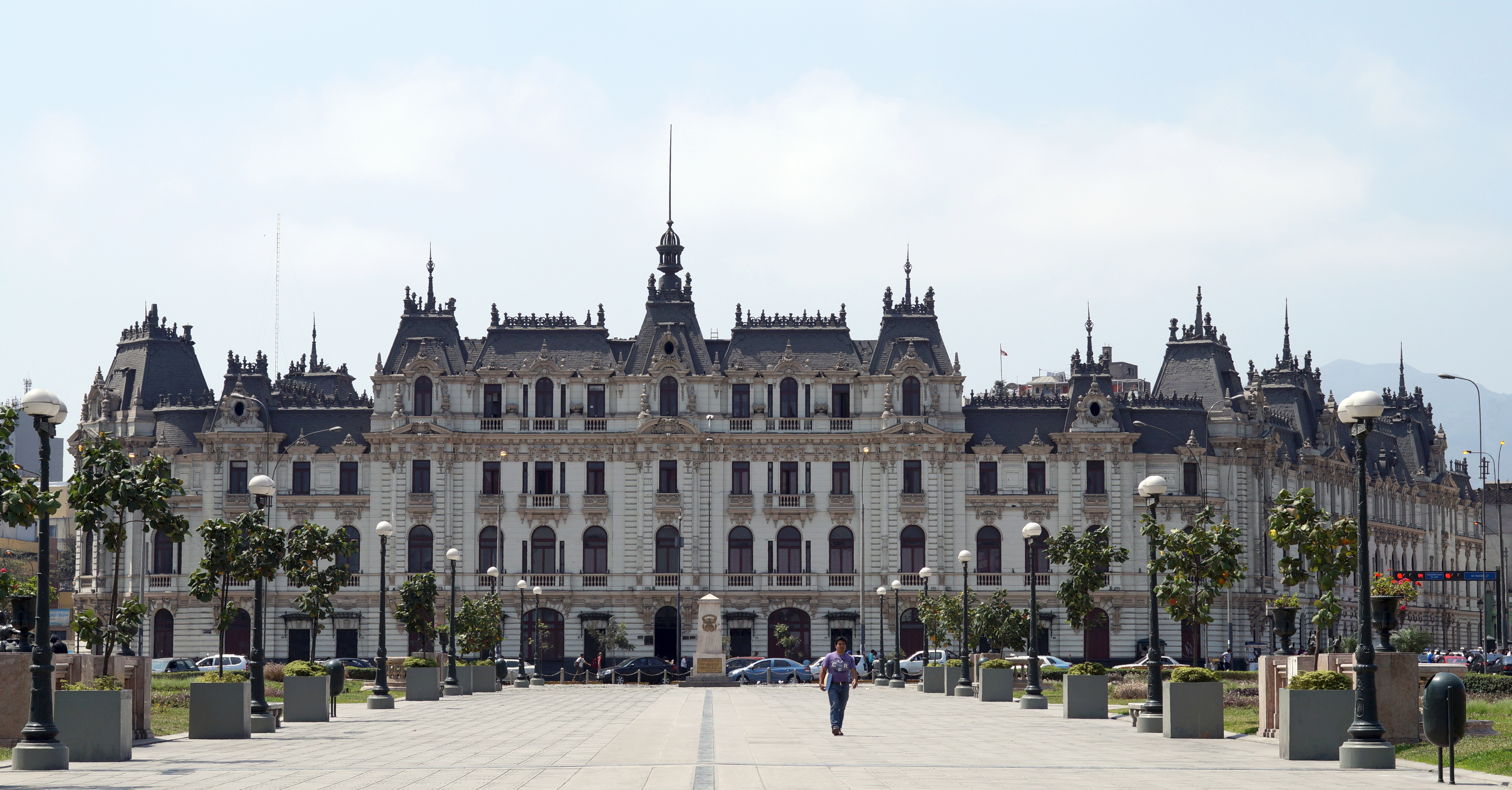
Edificio Rímac, Lima

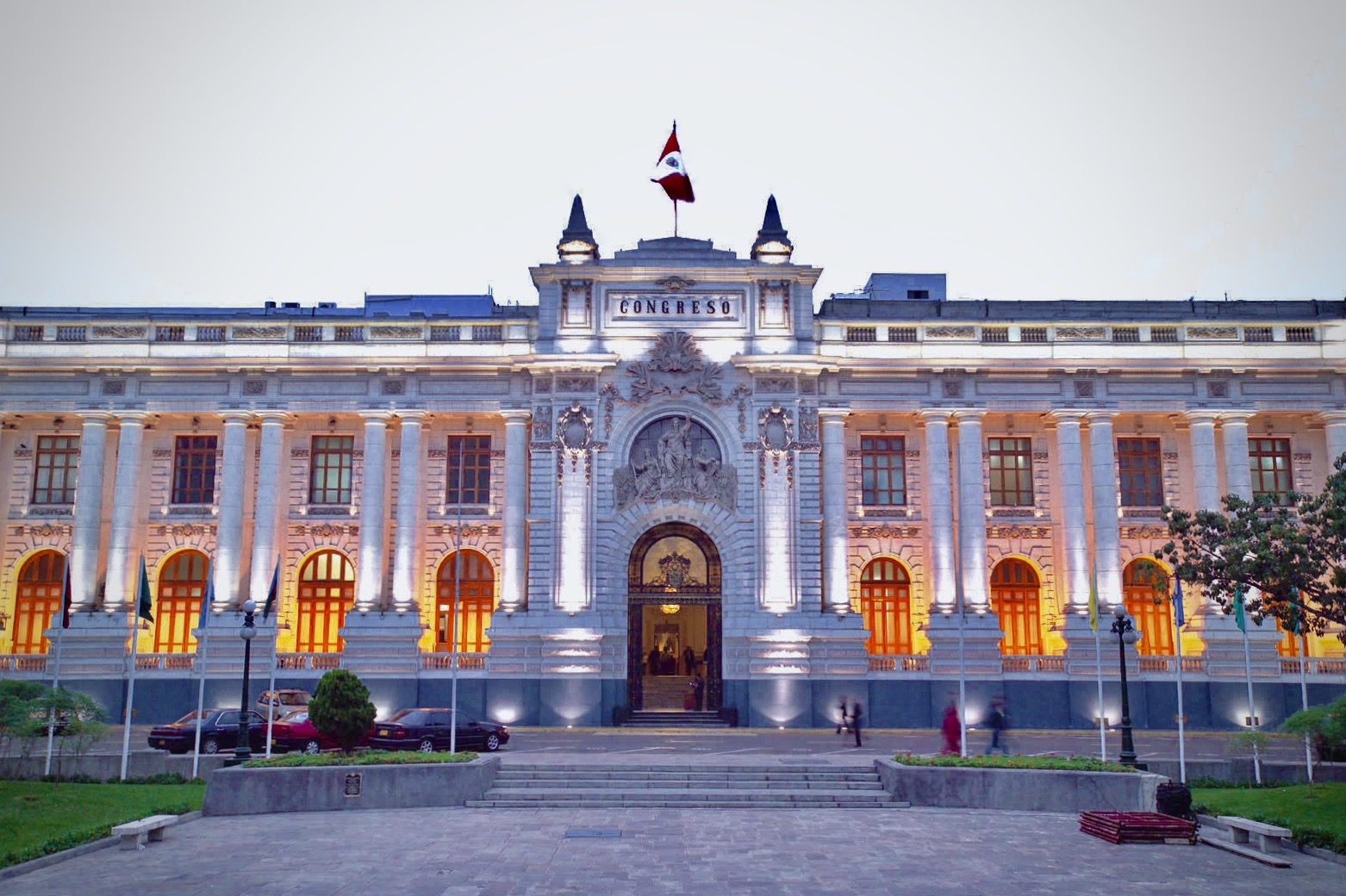
Palacio Legislativo del Perú, Lima

===== Beaux-Arts buildings in Peru =====
- 1855: Club Nacional, Lima
- 1906–1939: Legislative Palace, Lima
- 1919–1924: Edificio Rímac, Lima

==== Ecuador ====
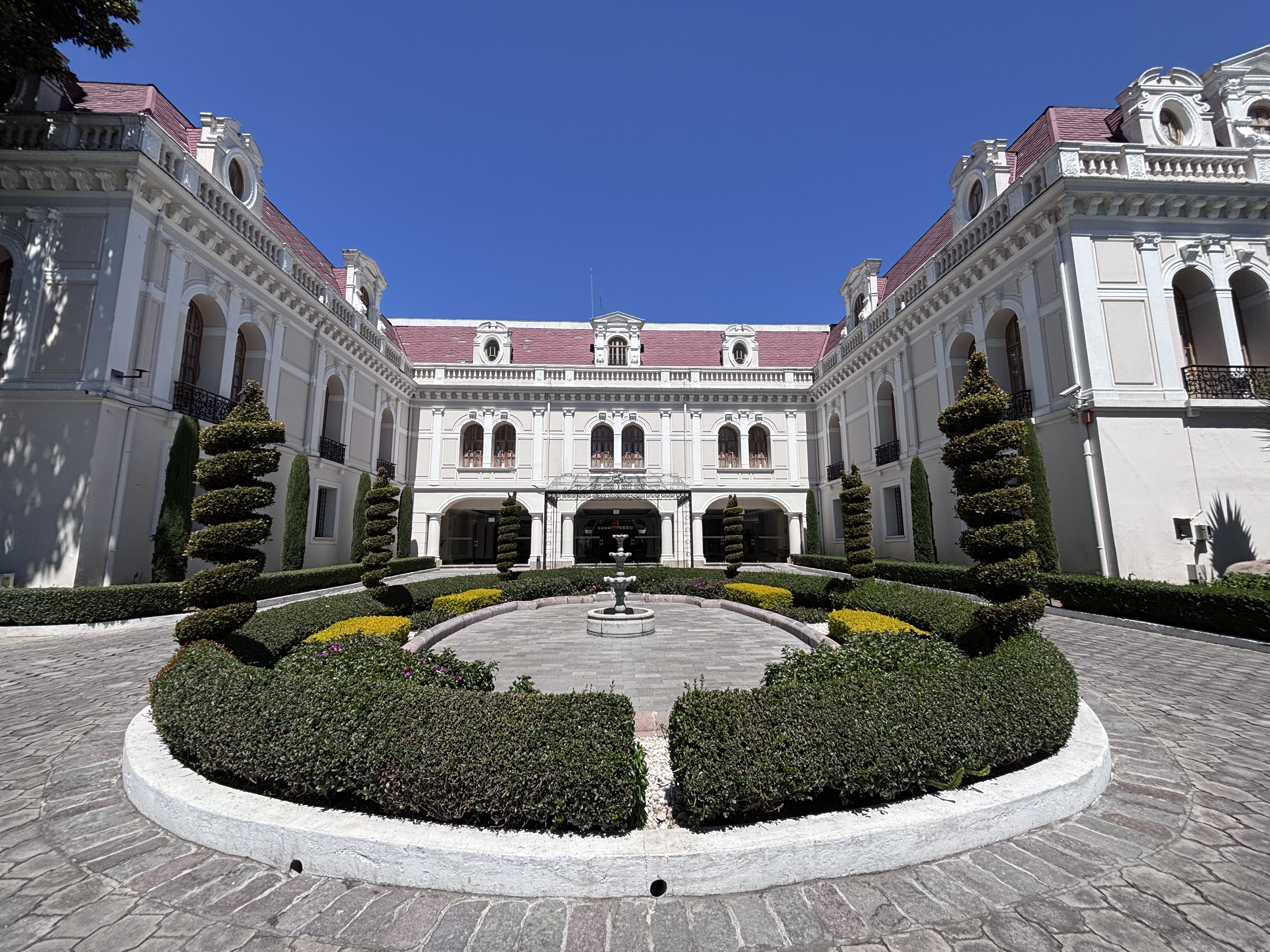
Palacio de Najas, Quito

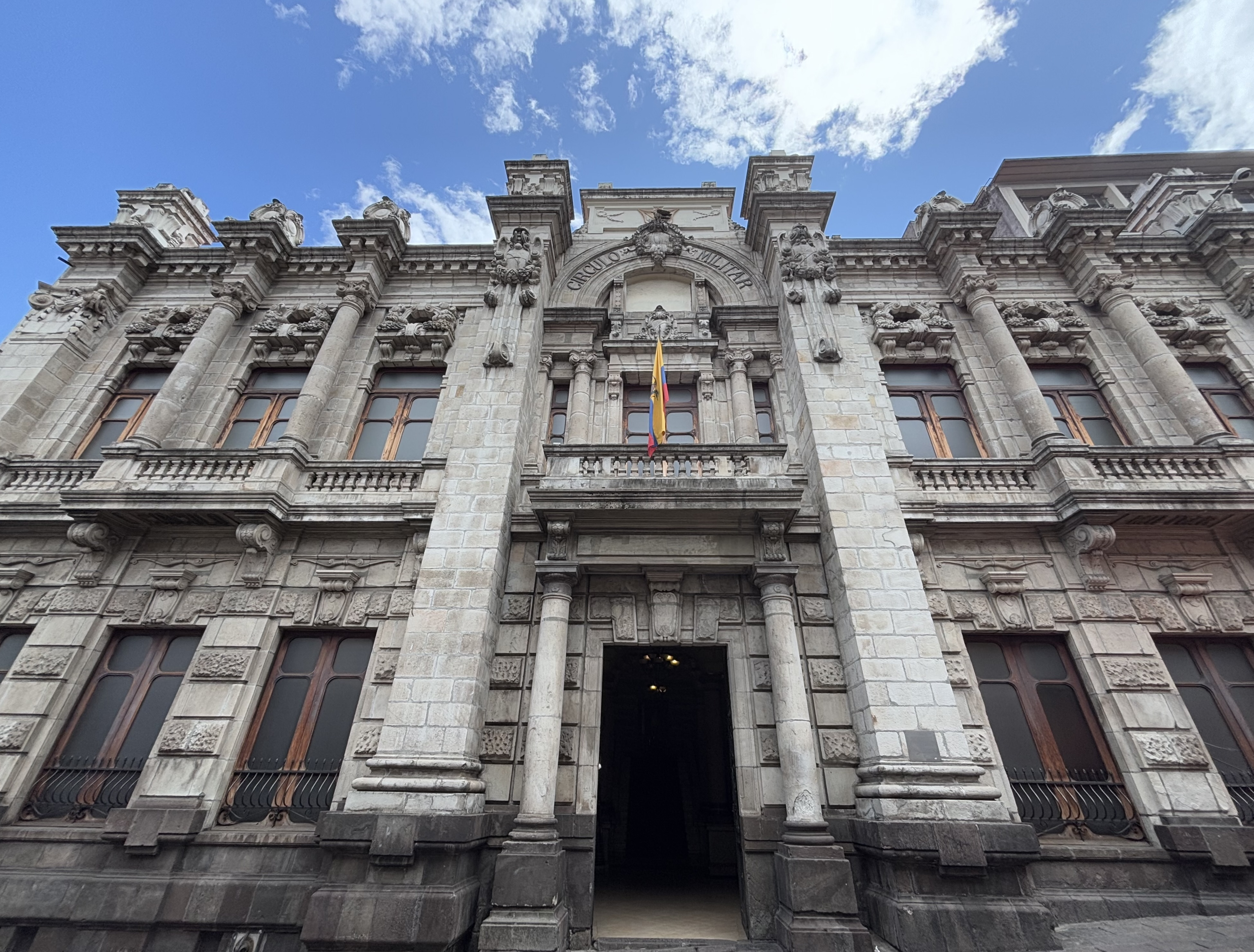
Antiguo Círculo Militar, Quito.

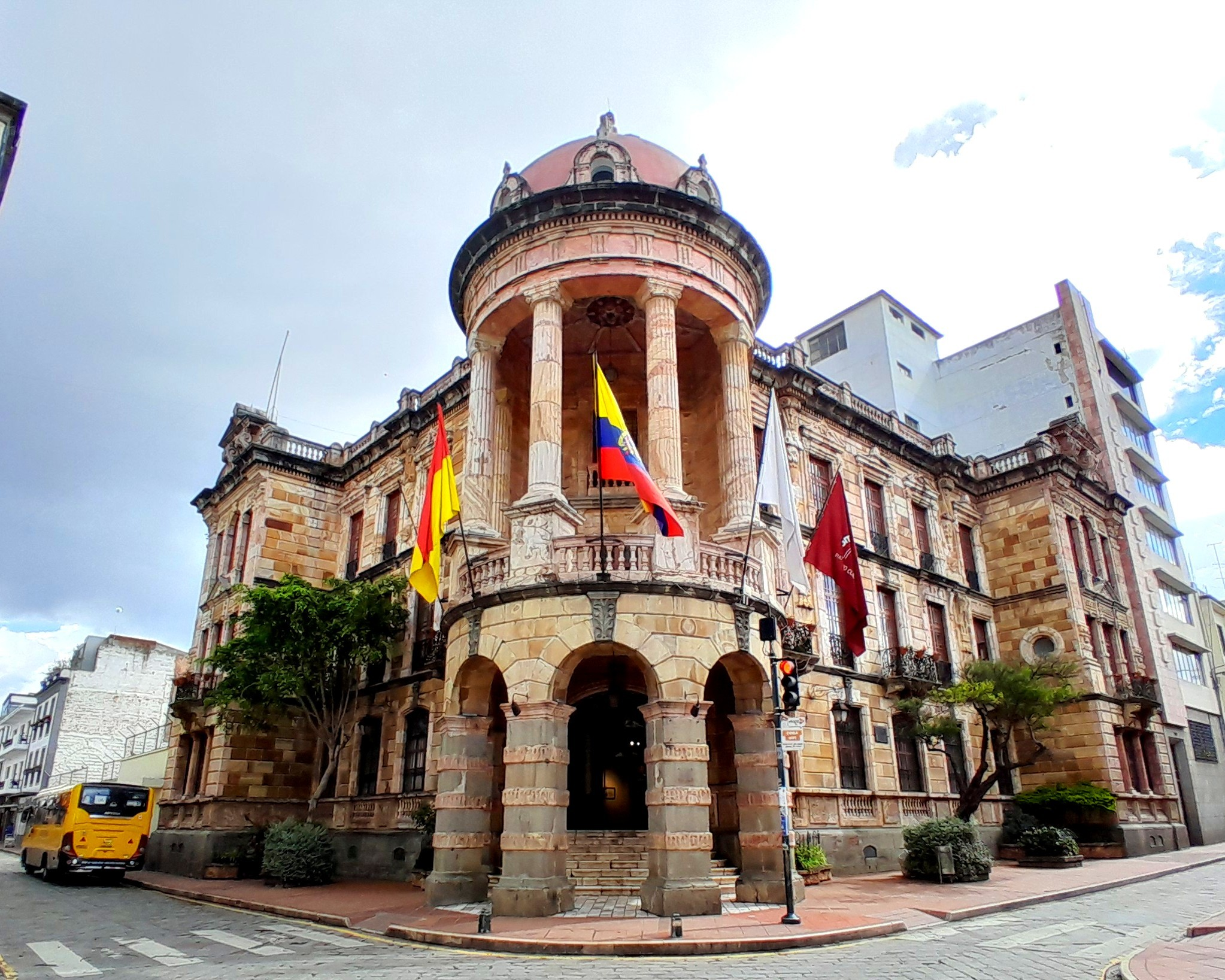
Antiguo edificio del Banco del Azuay, Cuenca

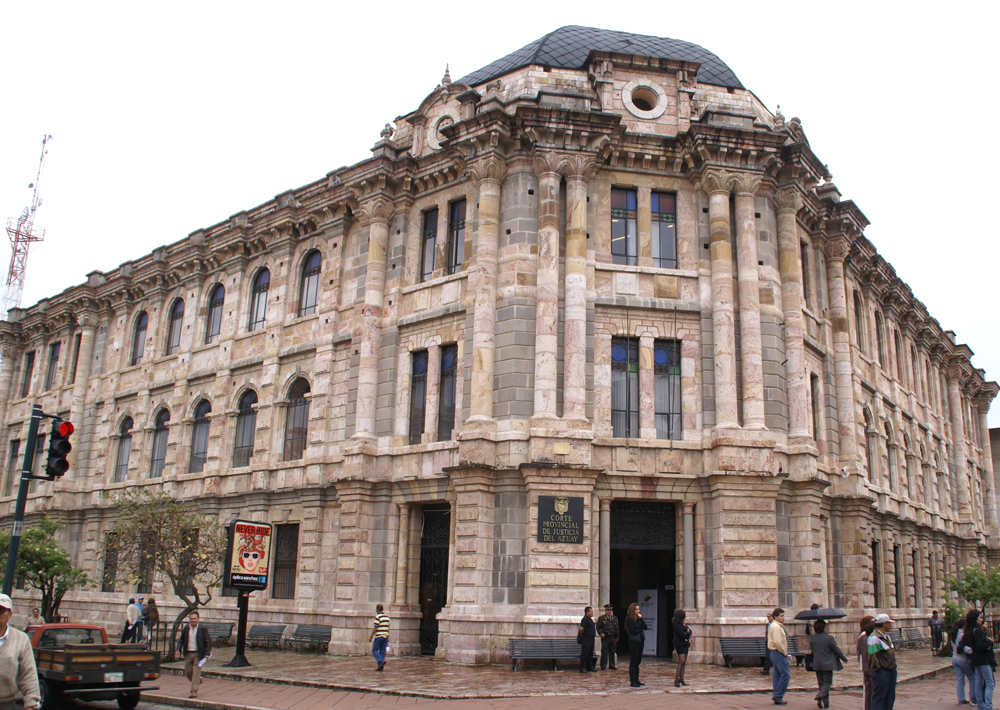
Corte provincial del Azuay, Cuenca

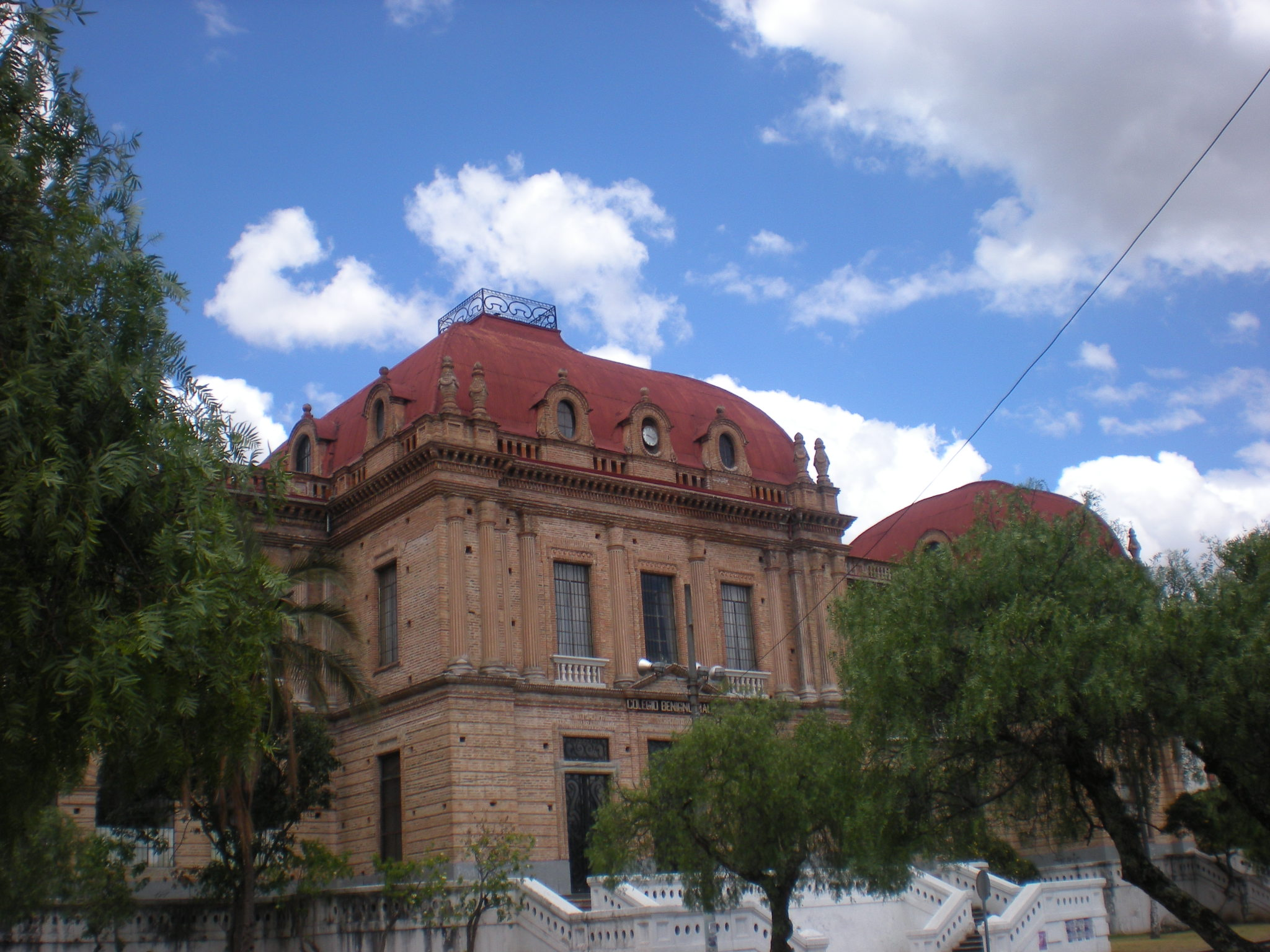
Colegio Benigno Malo, Cuenca

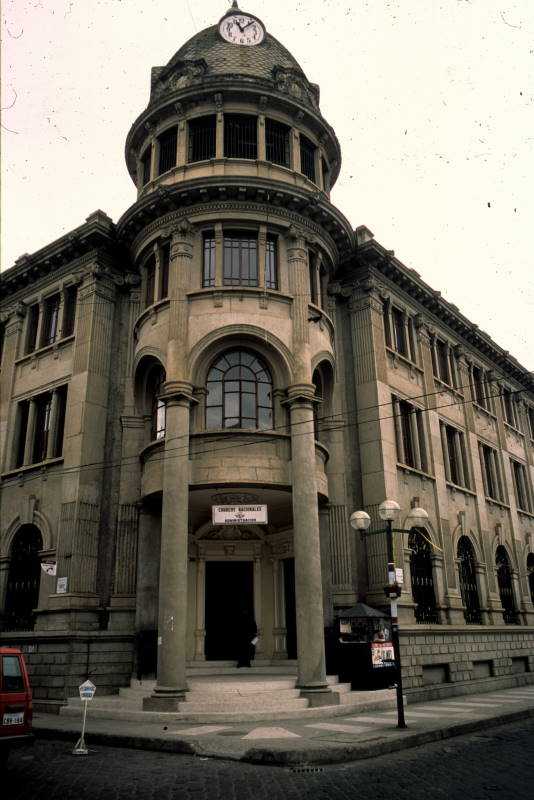
Edificio de correos, Riobamba.

=== Africa ===
==== Mozambique ====
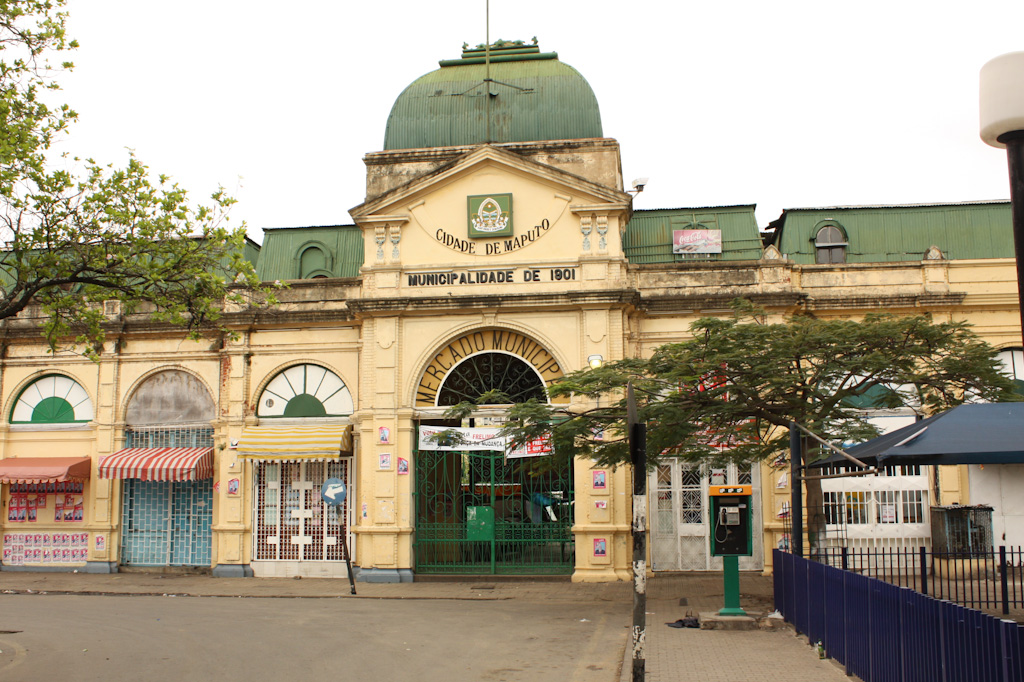
Mercado Municipal, Maputo

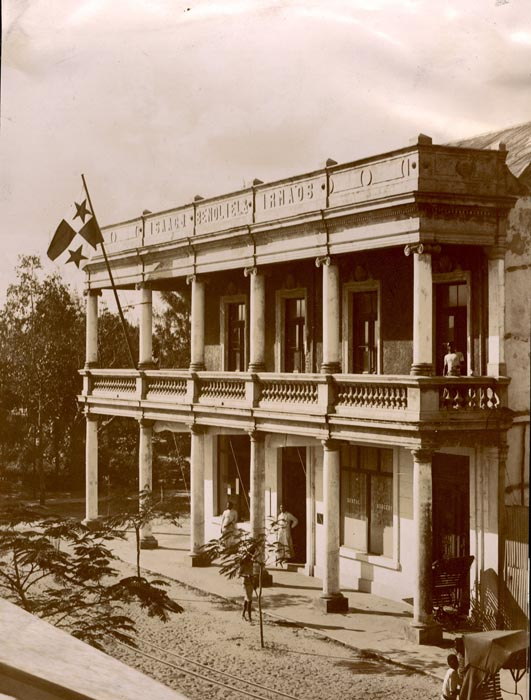
Banco da Beira

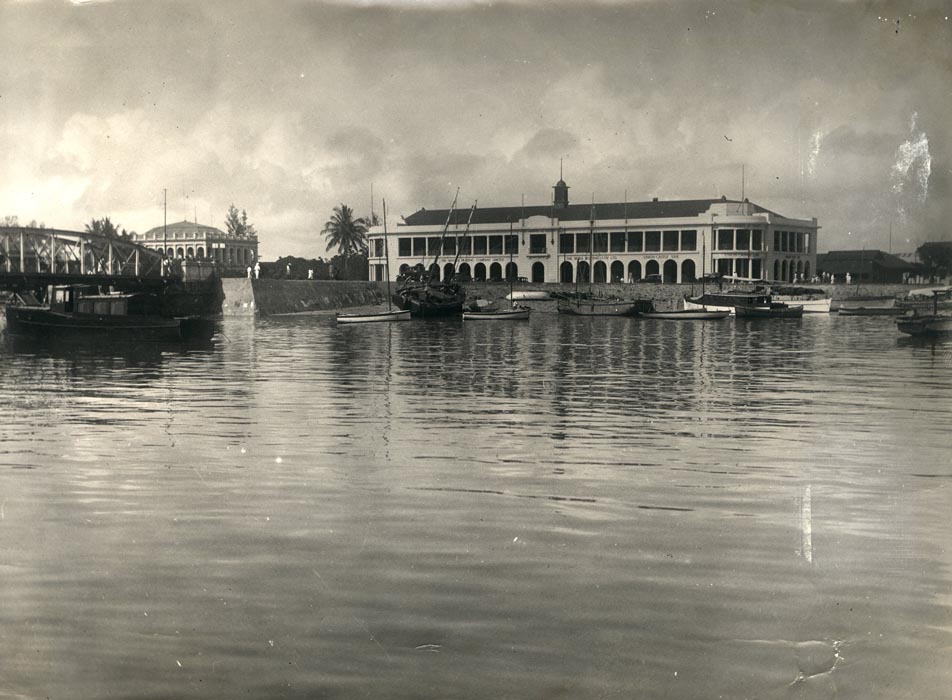
Casa Infante de Sagres, Beira

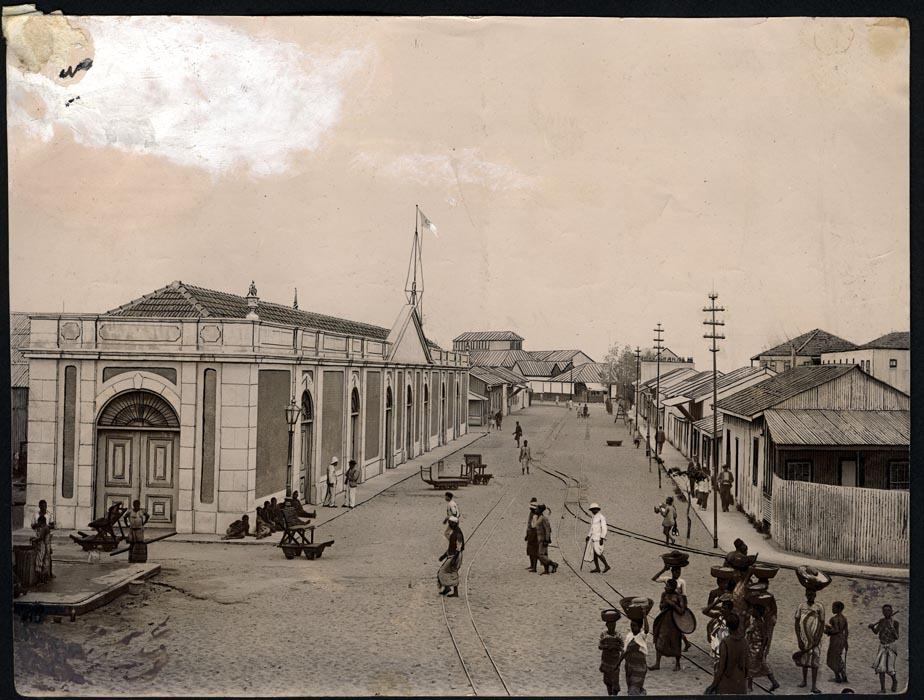
Edifício do Almoxarifado, Beira

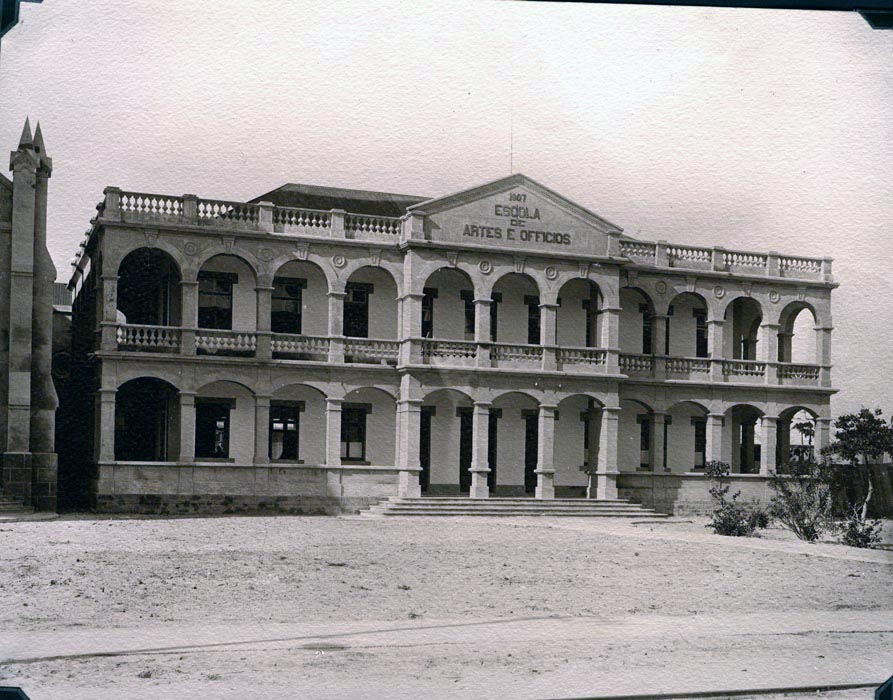
Escola de Artes e Ofícios, Beira

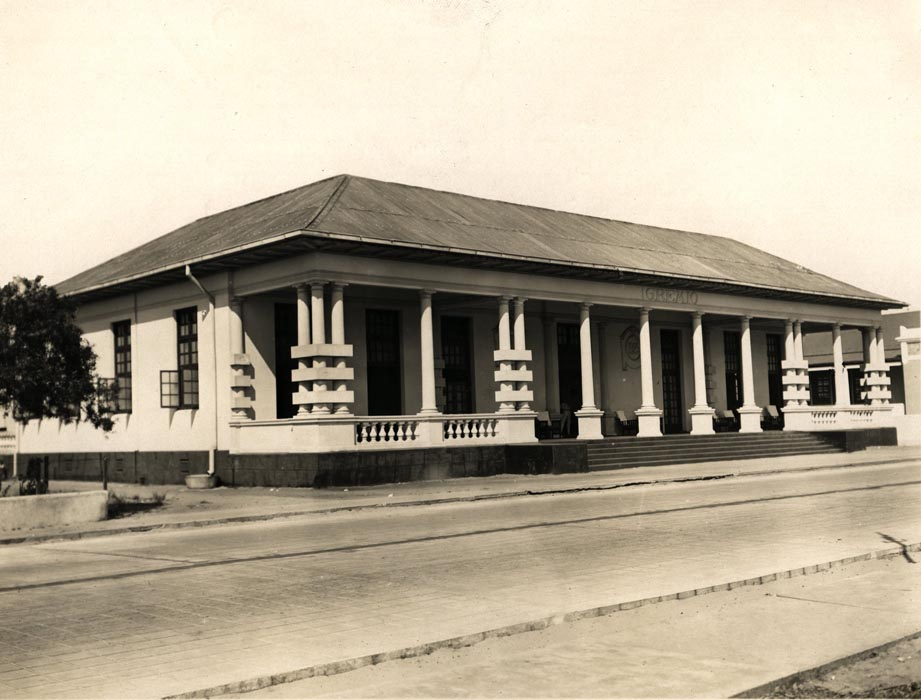
Palácio dos Desportos, Beira

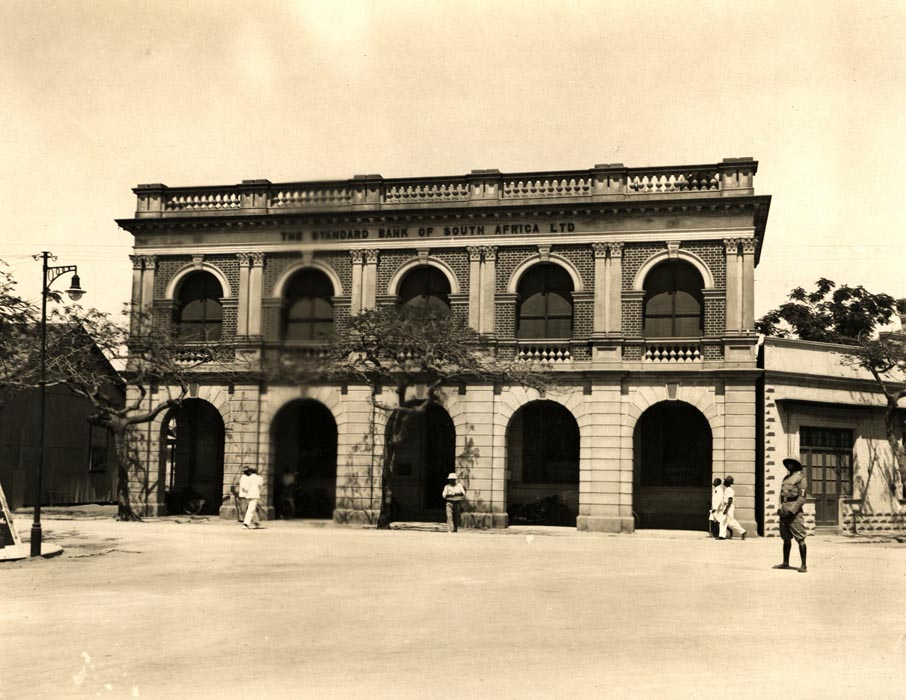
Standard Bank Building, Beira

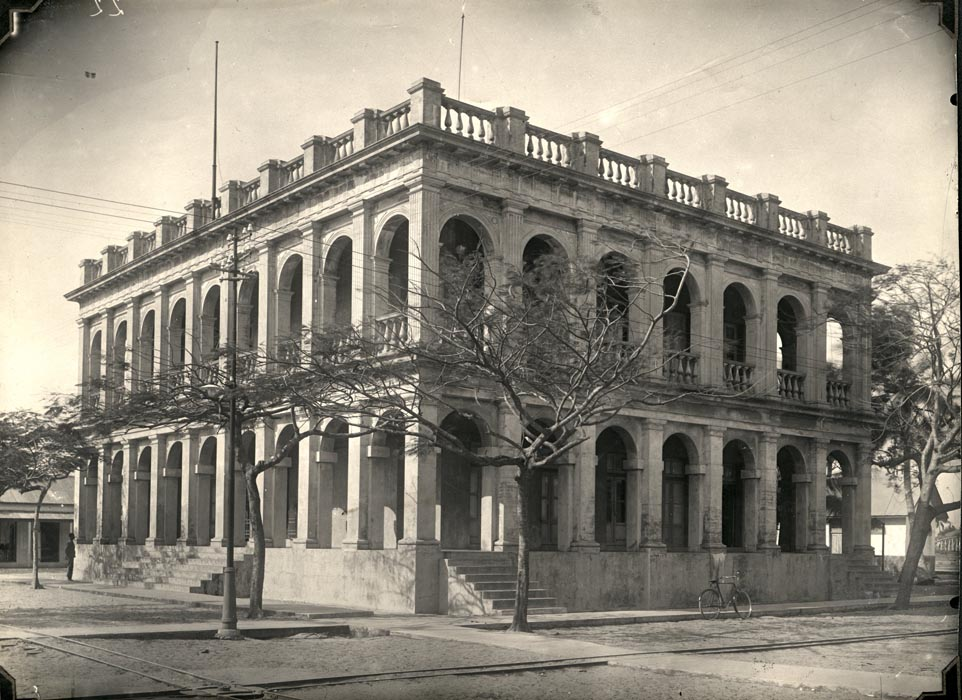
Tribunal da Beira

===== Beaux-Arts buildings in Mozambique =====
- 1901?: Municipal Market, Maputo
- 1933: Gil Vicente Theater, Maputo
- Banco da Beira, Beira
- Casa Ana, Beira
- Casa Infante de Sagres, Beira
- Edifício do Almoxarifado, Beira
- Escola de Artes e Ofícios, Beira
- Palácio dos Desportos, Beira
- Standard Bank Building, Beira
- Tribunal da Beira

=== Asia ===
==== Japan ====
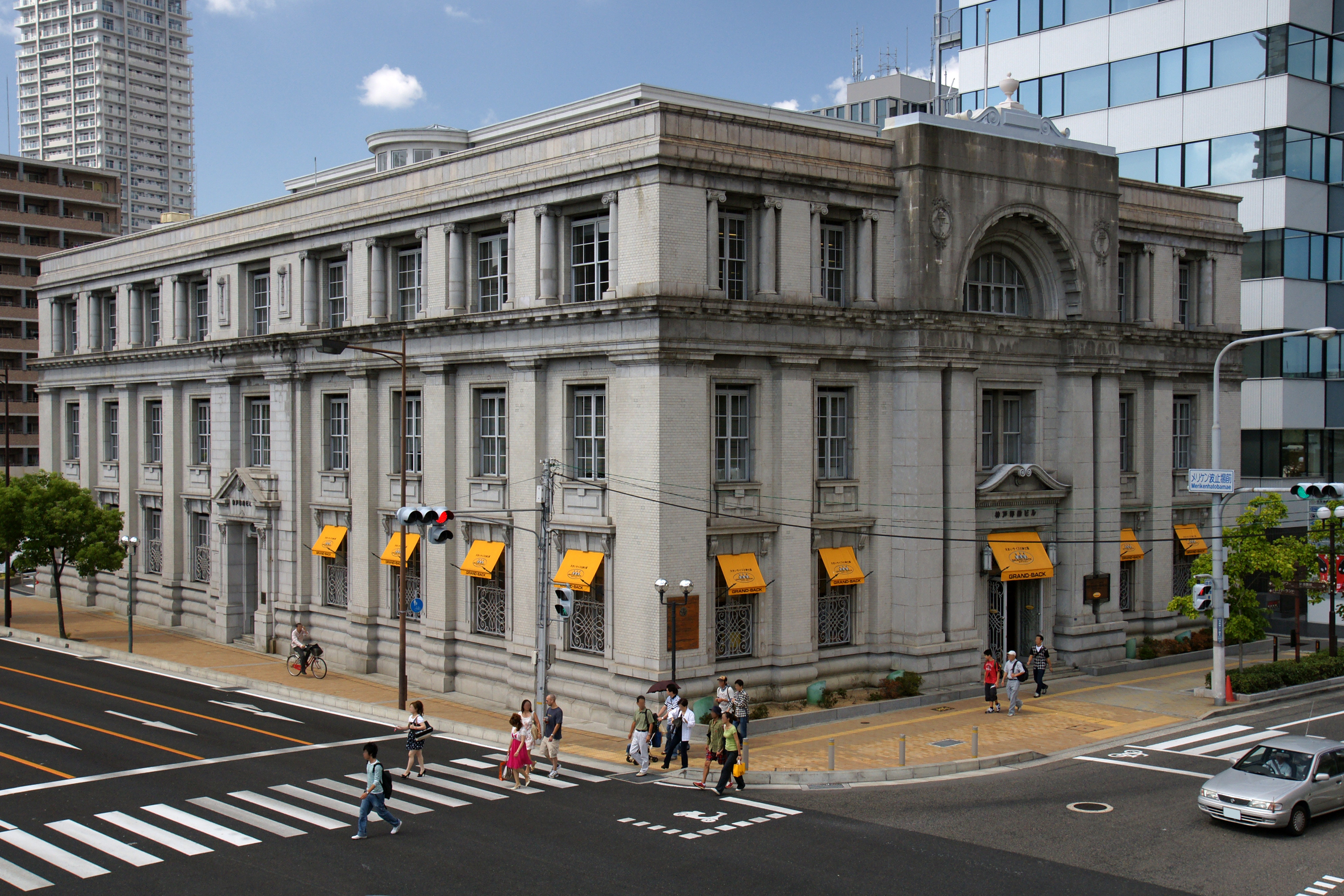
Kobe Yusen Building, Kobe

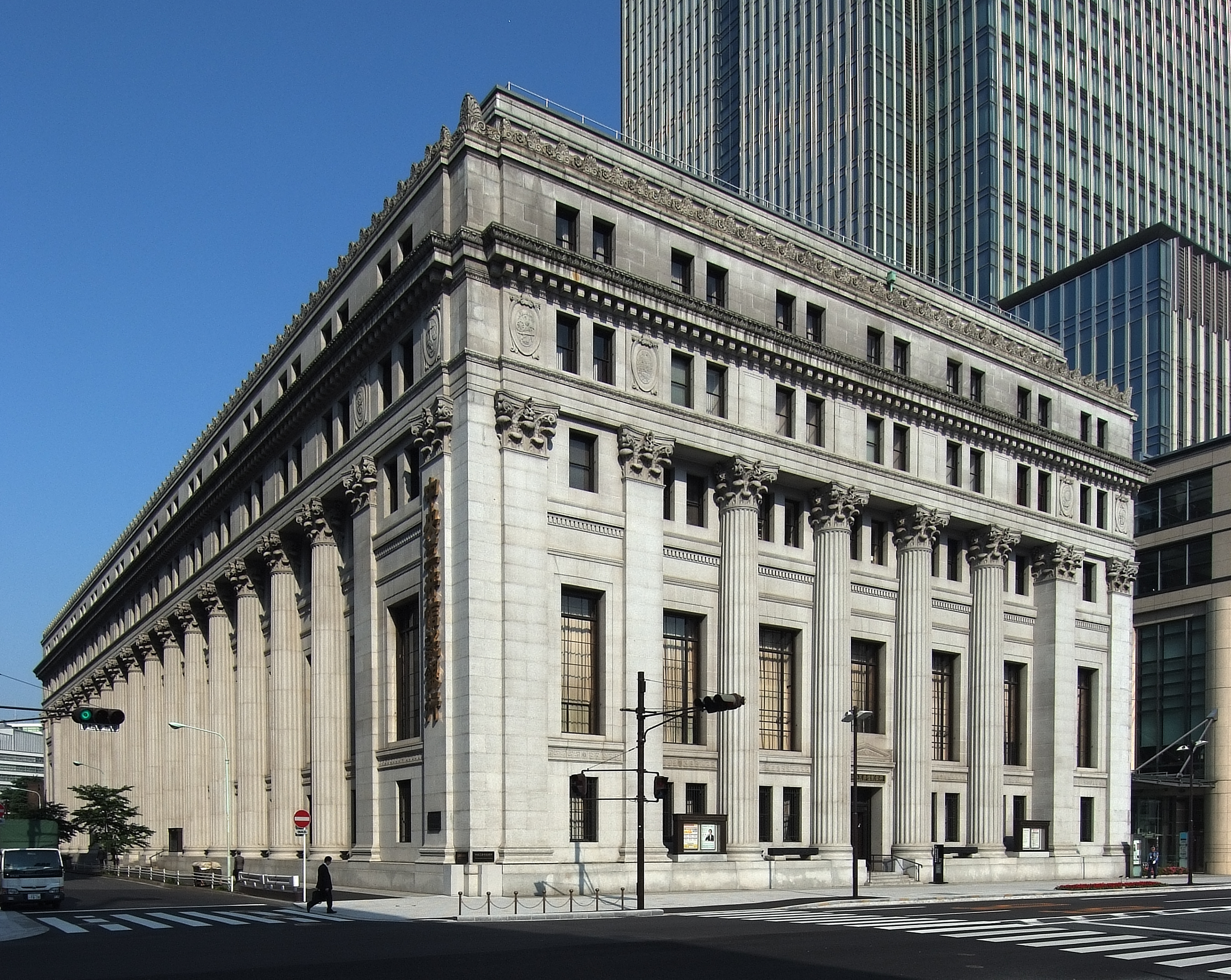
Mitsui Main Building, Tokyo

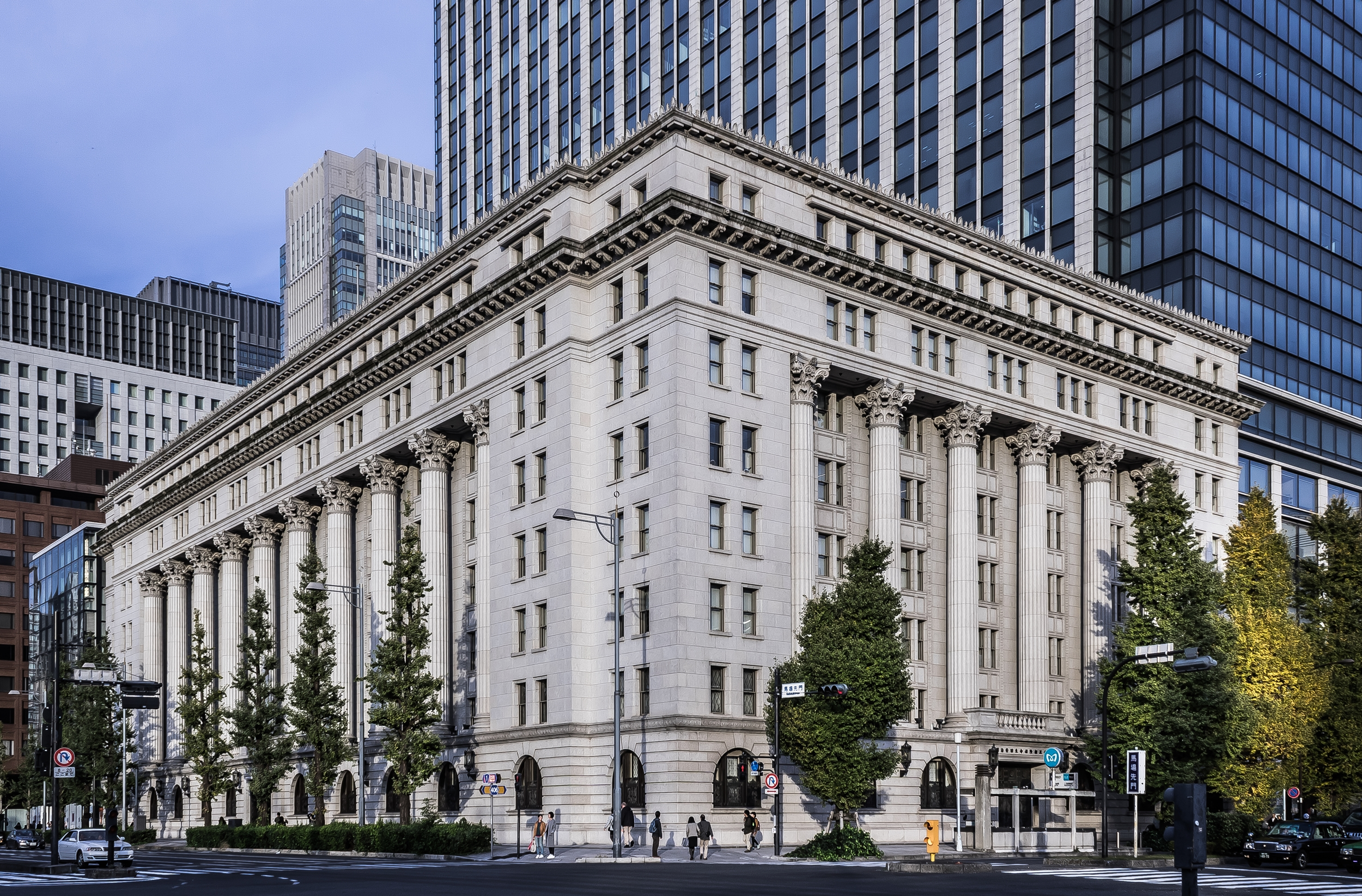
Meiji Life Insurance Building, Tokyo

===== Beaux-Arts buildings in Japan =====
- 1918: Kobe Yusen Building, Kobe
- 1926–1929: Mitsui Main Building, Tokyo
- 1930–1934: Meiji Life Insurance Building, Tokyo
- Yokohama Yusen Building

==== Philippines ====
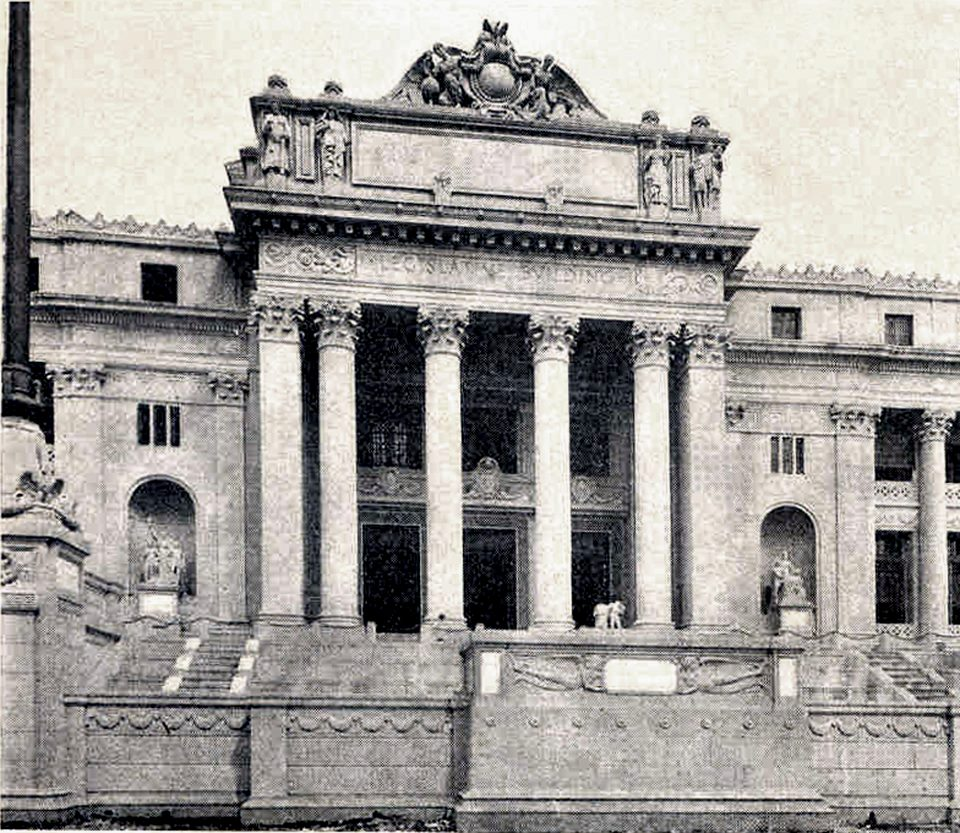
Legislative building

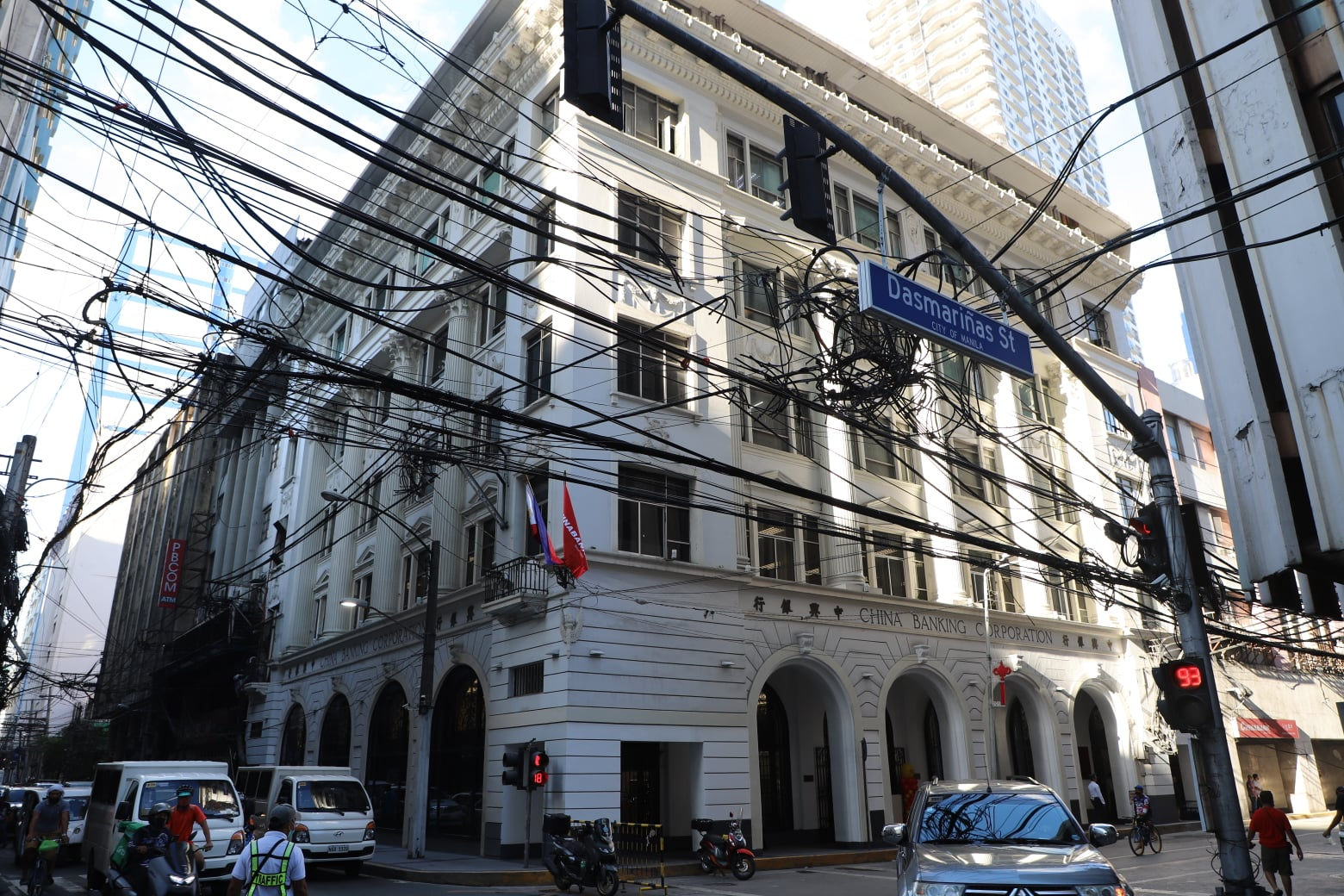
China bank Manila

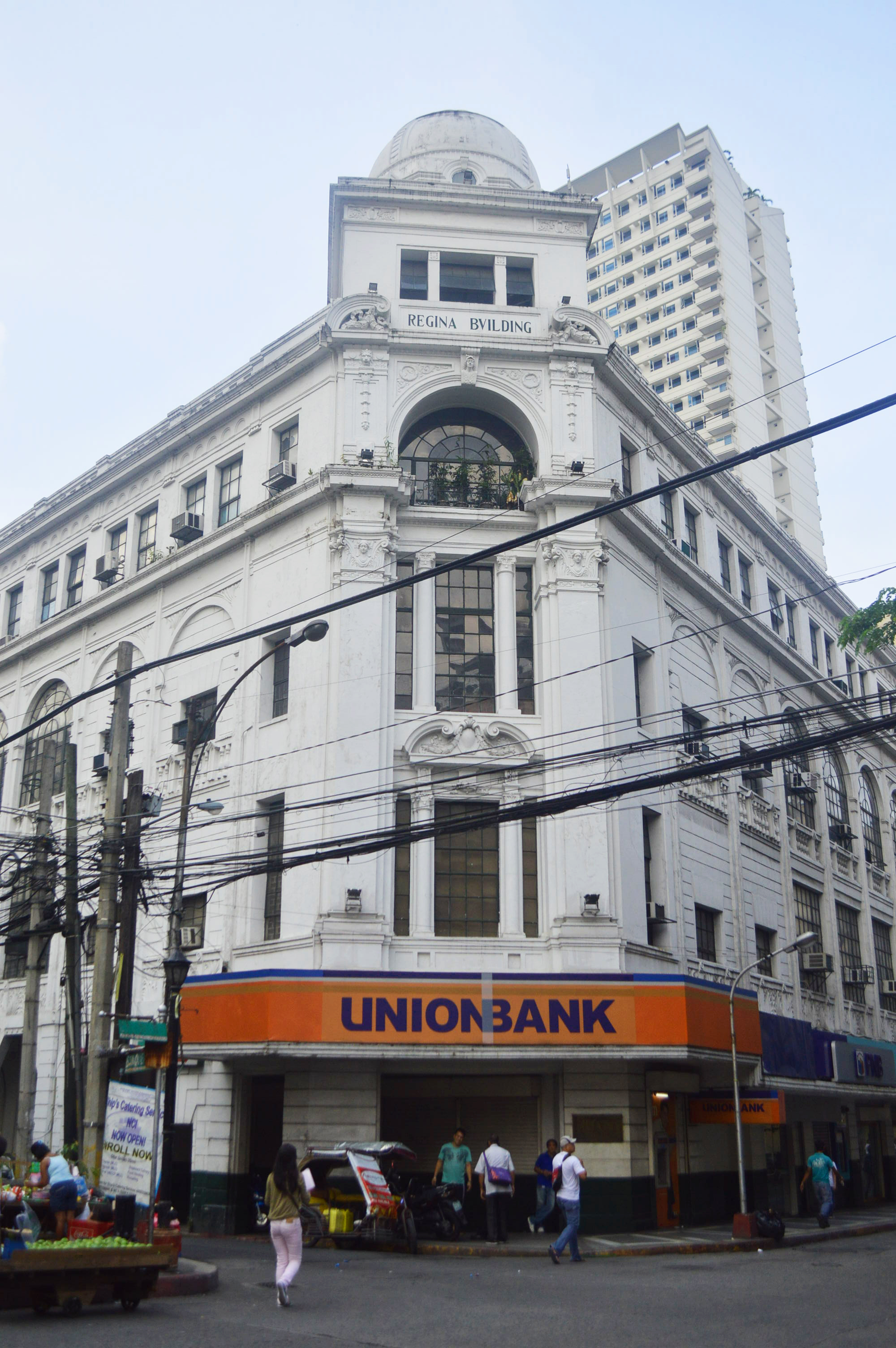
Regina Building, Manila

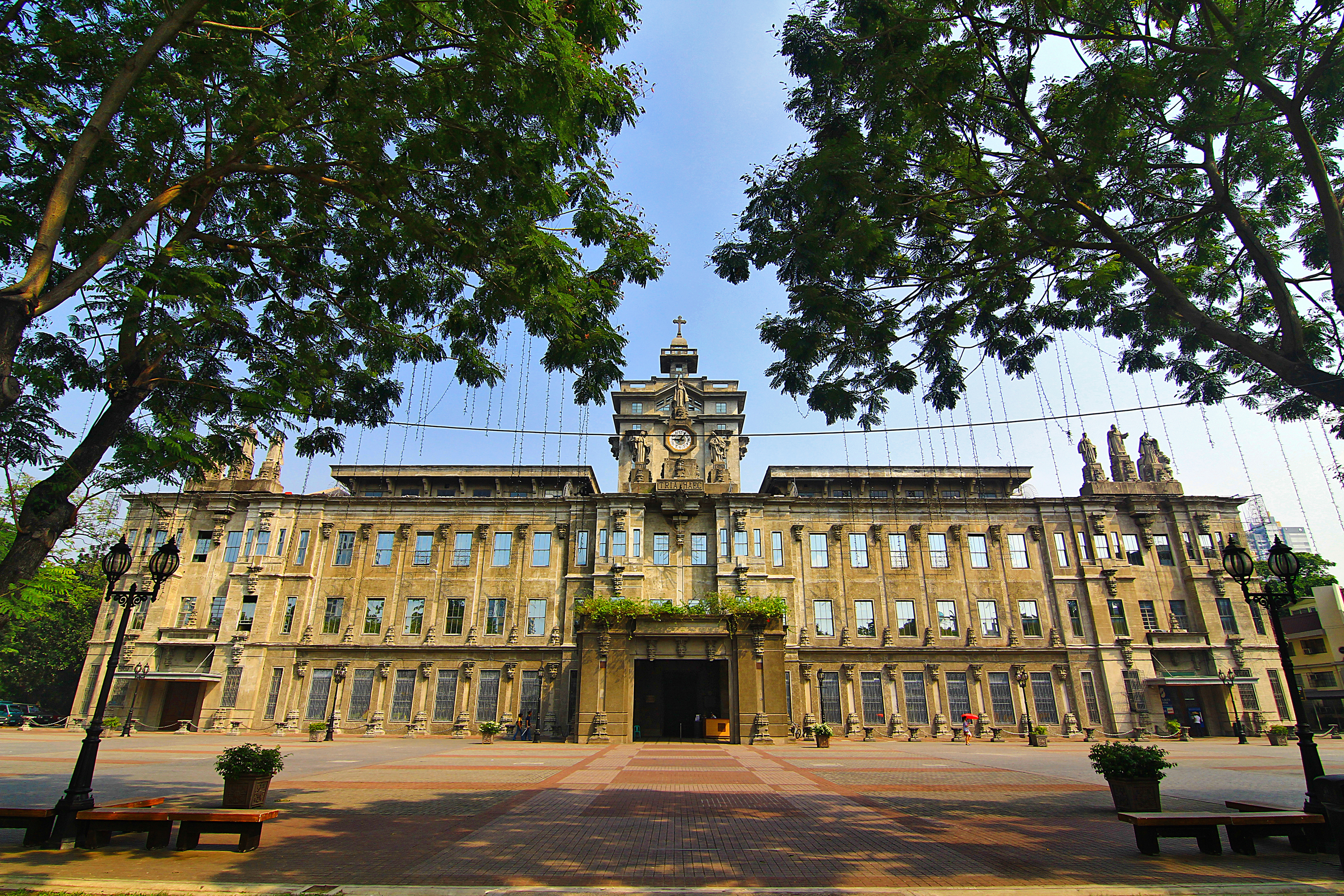
University of Santo Tomas Main Building, Manila

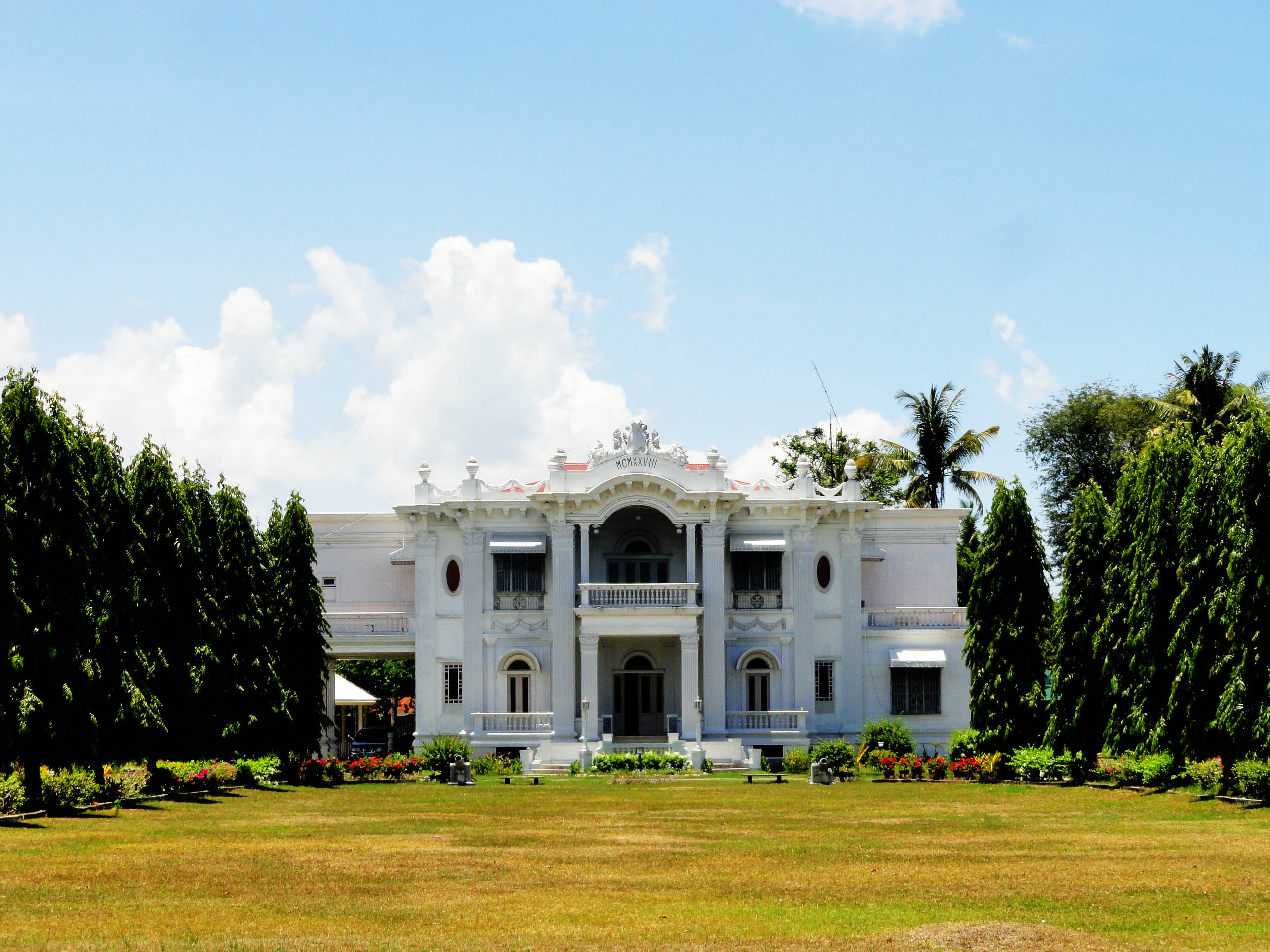
Lopez Mansion Iloilo

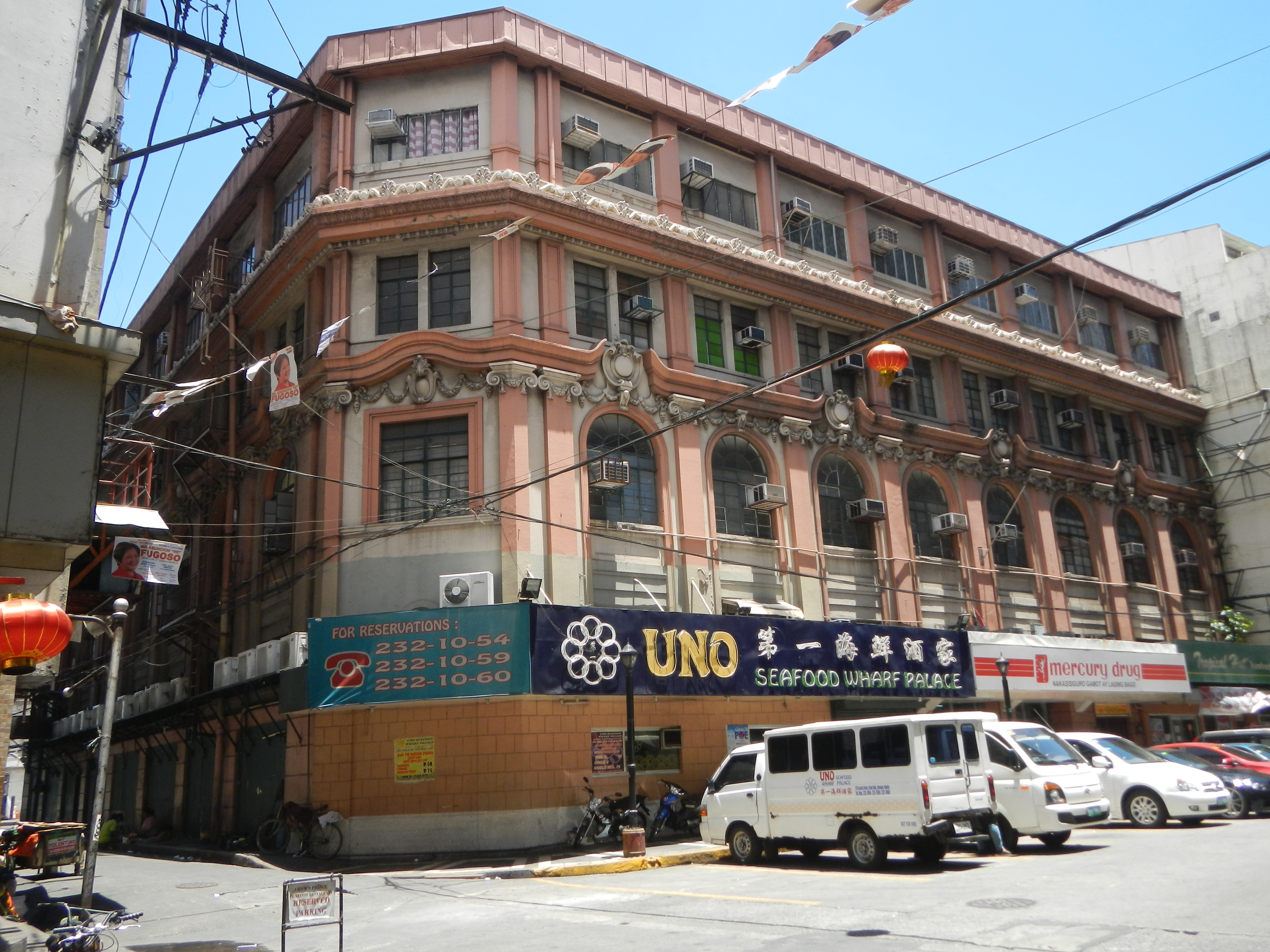
Calvo Building, Manila

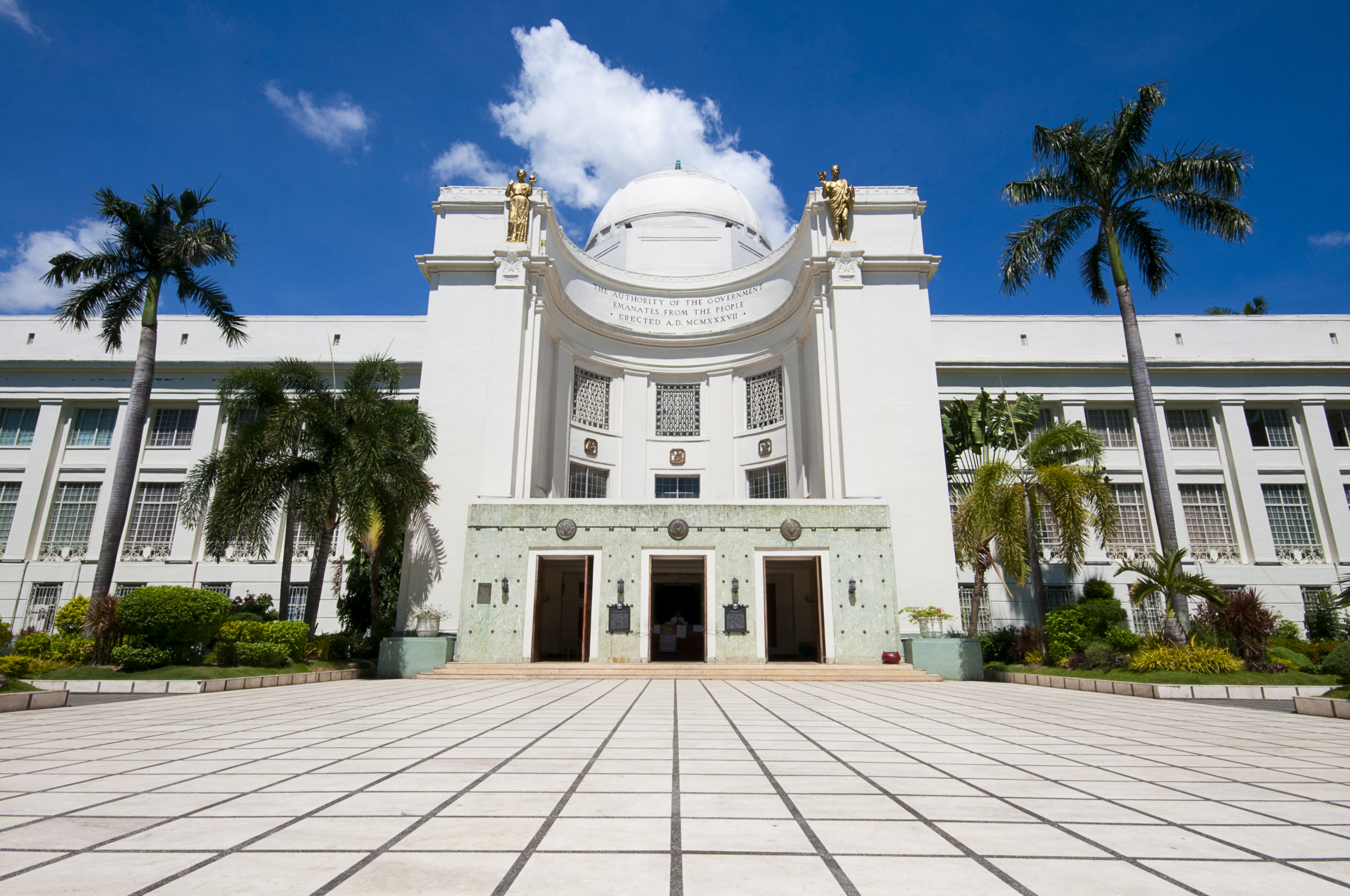
Cebu Capitol

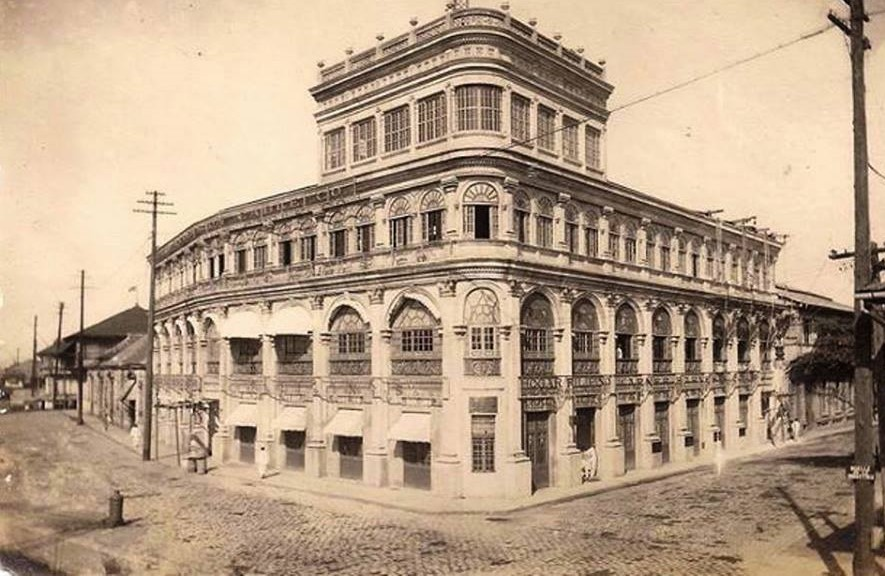
El Hogar

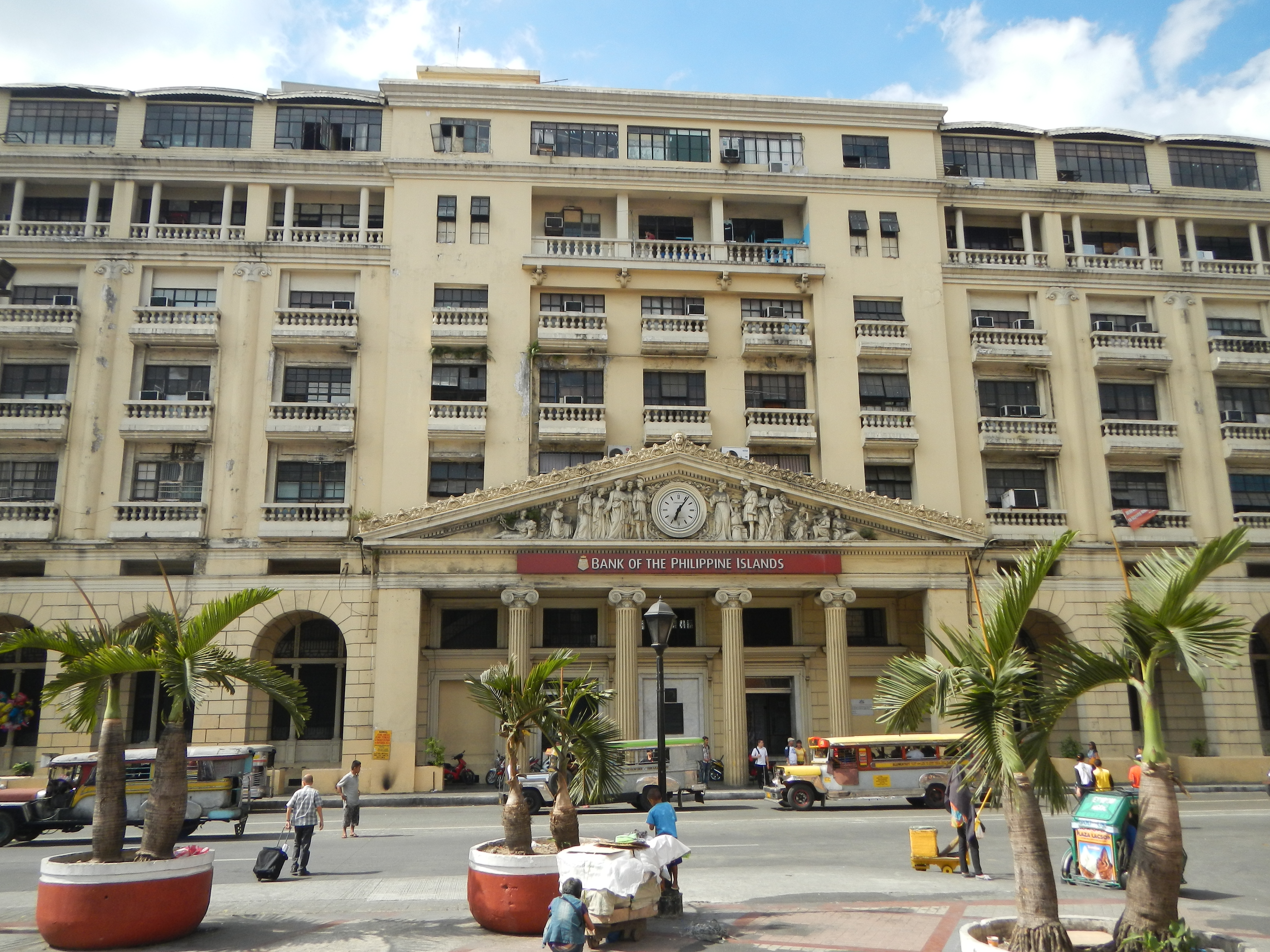
Don Roman Santos Building

===== Beaux-Arts buildings in Philippines =====
- 1911: Nurse's home, Philippine General Hospital
- 1914: El Hogar Filipino Building, Escolta, Manila
- 1915: Regina Building, Escolta, Manila
- 1916: Aduana de Iloilo
- 1919: Jones Bridge, Ermita and Binondo, Manila
- 1919: Grand Cafe building Manila
- 1919: Luneta Hotel, Ermita, Manila
- 1920: St. La Salle Hall
- 1924–1927: University of Santo Tomas Main Building, Sampaloc, Manila
- 1928: Lopez Mansion, Jaro, Iloilo City
- 1928: Natividad Building, Escolta, Manila
- 1937: Lizares Mansion, Jaro, Iloilo City
- 1938: Calvo Building, Escolta, Manila
- Juan Luna Building
- Natalio Enriquez Mansion, Sariaya, Quezon
- Filipinas Insurance co. building
- National Museum of Anthropology (Manila)
- National Museum of Natural History (Manila)
- Manila City Hall
- Manila Post office
- Lingayen capitol
- Negros Occidental capitol
- Philippine General Hospital
- Philippine Women's University
- Batangas capitol
- Sorsogon provincial capitol
- Rizal Hall Manila
- Casa Boix, Quiapo, Manila
- Trinidad ancestral house, Iba, Zambales
- Gawas harigi house, Carigara, Leyte

=== Oceania ===
==== Australia ====
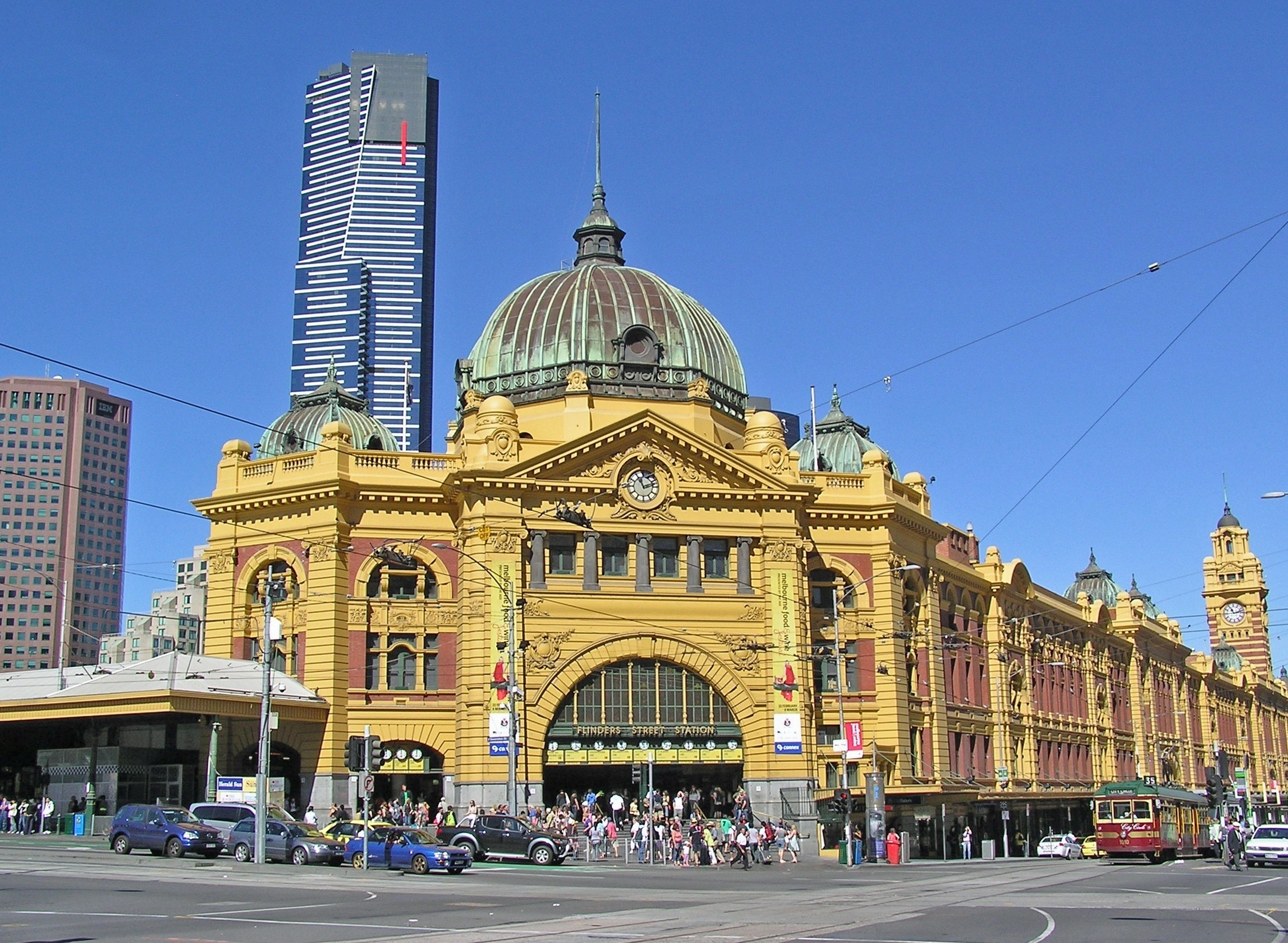
Flinders Street railway station, Melbourne

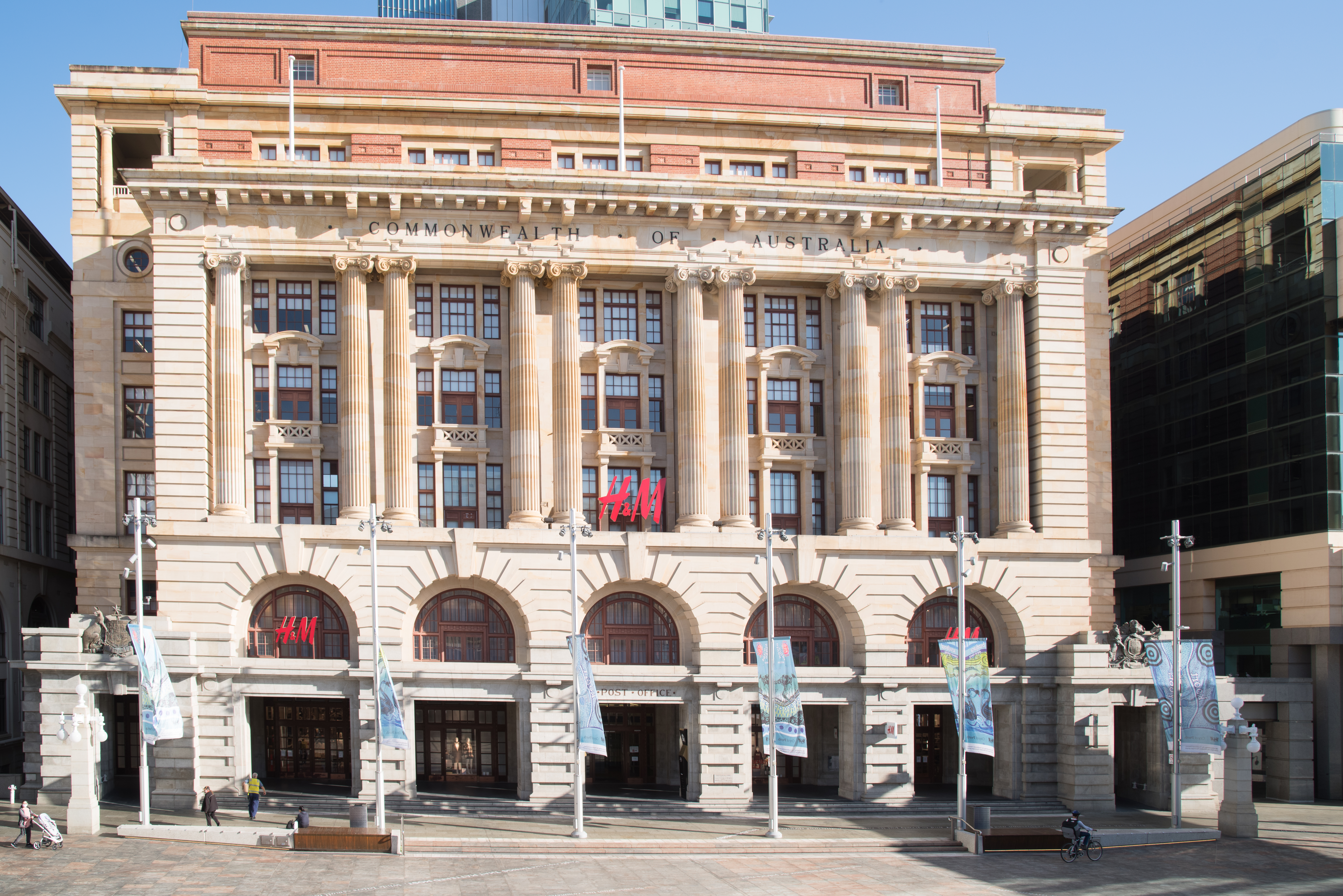
General Post Office, Perth

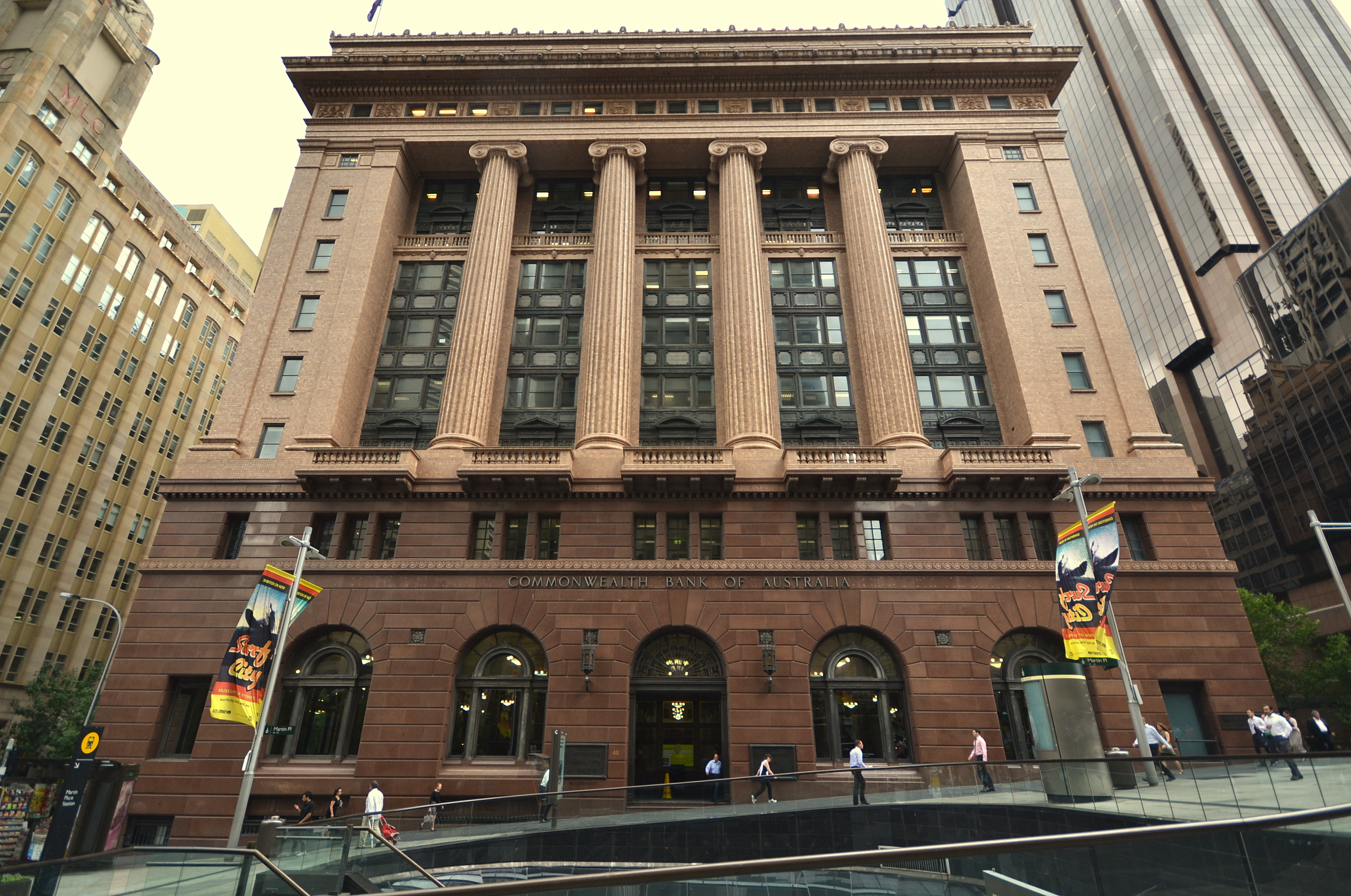
State Savings Bank building, Sydney

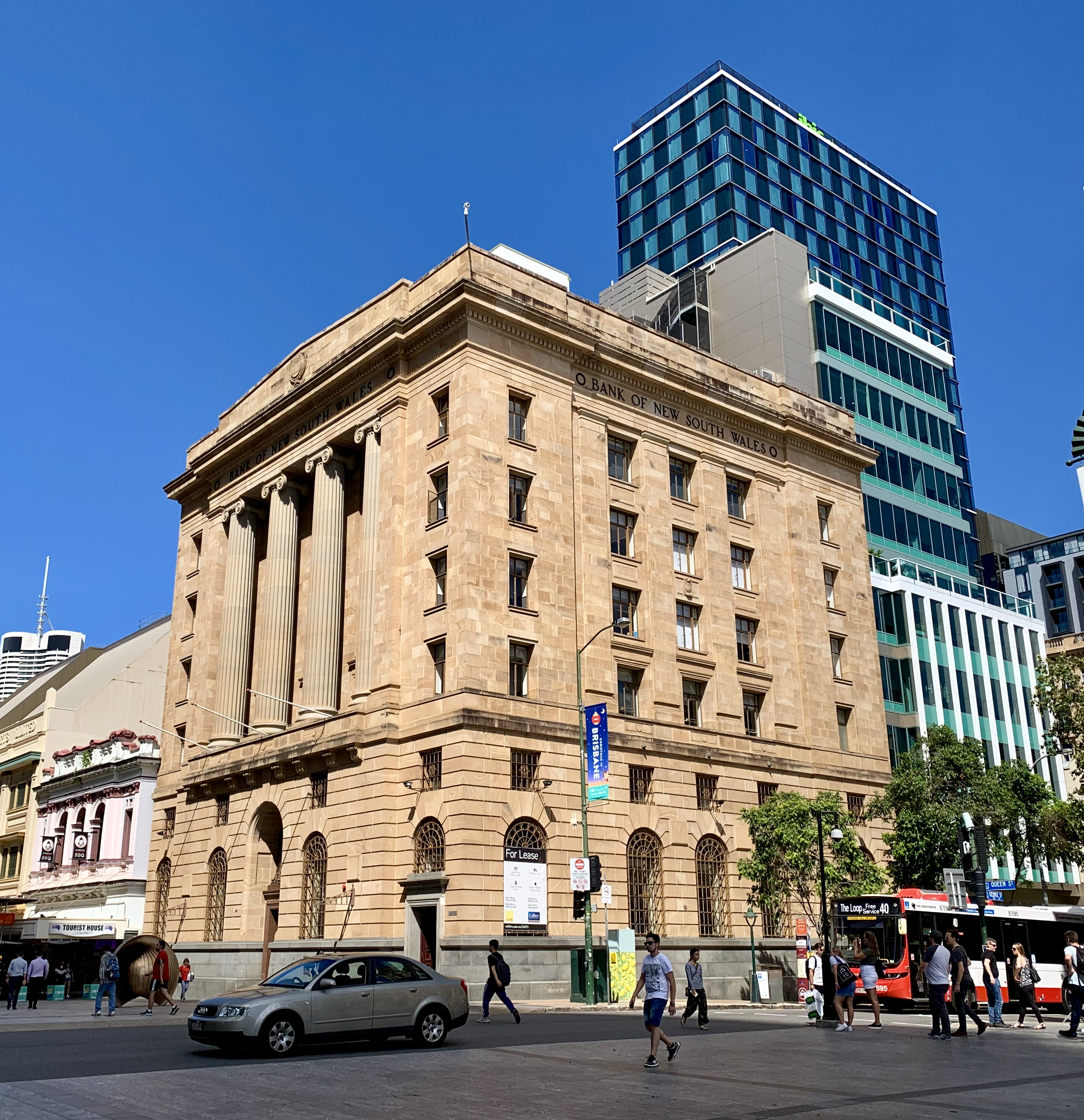
Bank of New South Wales building, Brisbane

Several Australian cities have some significant examples of the style. It was typically applied to large, solid-looking public office buildings and banks, particularly during the 1920s.

===== Beaux-Arts buildings in Australia =====
- 1900–1910: Flinders Street railway station, Melbourne
- 1914–1923: General Post Office building, Forrest Place, Perth
- 1916: Perpetual Trustee Company Limited, Hunter Street, Sydney
- 1917: Former Mail Exchange Building, Melbourne
- 1920: National Theatre, Melbourne
- 1925–1928: Commonwealth Bank building, Martin Place, Sydney
- 1926: Argus Building, La Trobe Street, Melbourne
- 1927: Emily McPherson College of Domestic Economy, Melbourne
- 1928–1930: Bank of New South Wales building, Elizabeth Street, Brisbane
- 1928: Port Authority building, Melbourne
- 1928: Herald & Weekly Times Building, Flinders Street, Melbourne
- 1933: Commonwealth Bank building, Forrest Place, Perth

==== New Zealand ====
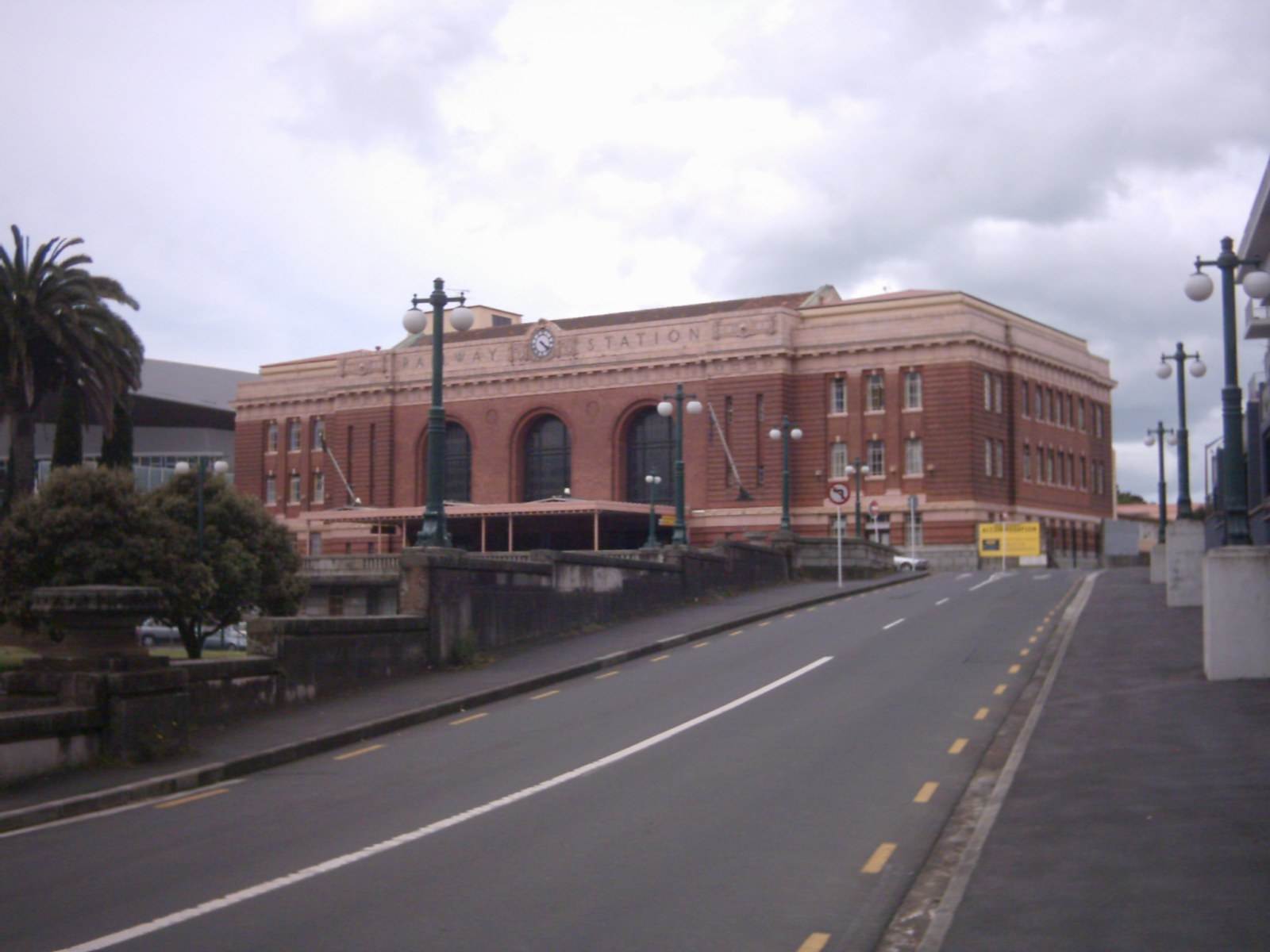
Former Auckland railway station, Auckland

===== Beaux-Arts buildings in New Zealand =====
- 1928–1930: Auckland railway station, Auckland

== See also ==
- Academic art
- Second Empire architecture
- Beaux Arts Village, Washington

== Bibliography ==
- Celac, Mariana; Carabela, Octavian; Marcu-Lapadat, Marius (2017). Bucharest Architecture – an annotated guide. Order of Architects of Romania. ISBN 978-973-0-23884-6.
- Texier, Simon (2012). Paris- Panorama de l'architecture. Parigramme. ISBN 978-2-84096-667-8.a ddi
